= United Nations Security Council elections =

United Nations Security Council elections are held annually to select members of the United Nations Security Council to serve a two-year term.

== Electoral system ==
The electorate is the whole UN General Assembly, with each country casting one vote. The seats up for election differ by year. In certain years, a group may have one, two, all or none of its seats up for election. The elections often have little or no competition.

To be approved, a candidate must receive at least two-thirds of all votes cast for that seat. A retiring member is not eligible for immediate re-election.

== List ==
- January 1946 United Nations Security Council election
- November 1946 United Nations Security Council election
- 1947 United Nations Security Council election
- 1959 United Nations Security Council election
- 1963 United Nations Security Council election
- 1964 United Nations Security Council election
- 1965 United Nations Security Council election
- 1966 United Nations Security Council election
- 1967 United Nations Security Council election
- 1968 United Nations Security Council election
- 1969 United Nations Security Council election
- 1970 United Nations Security Council election
- 1971 United Nations Security Council election
- 1972 United Nations Security Council election
- 1973 United Nations Security Council election
- 1974 United Nations Security Council election
- 1975 United Nations Security Council election
- 1976 United Nations Security Council election
- 1977 United Nations Security Council election
- 1978 United Nations Security Council election
- 1979 United Nations Security Council election
- 1980 United Nations Security Council election
- 1981 United Nations Security Council election
- 1982 United Nations Security Council election
- 1983 United Nations Security Council election
- 1984 United Nations Security Council election
- 1985 United Nations Security Council election
- 1986 United Nations Security Council election
- 1987 United Nations Security Council election
- 1988 United Nations Security Council election
- 1989 United Nations Security Council election
- 1990 United Nations Security Council election
- 1991 United Nations Security Council election
- 1992 United Nations Security Council election
- 1993 United Nations Security Council election
- 1994 United Nations Security Council election
- 1995 United Nations Security Council election
- 1996 United Nations Security Council election
- 1997 United Nations Security Council election
- 1998 United Nations Security Council election
- 1999 United Nations Security Council election
- 2000 United Nations Security Council election
- 2001 United Nations Security Council election
- 2002 United Nations Security Council election
- 2003 United Nations Security Council election
- 2004 United Nations Security Council election
- 2005 United Nations Security Council election
- 2006 United Nations Security Council election
- 2007 United Nations Security Council election
- 2008 United Nations Security Council election
- 2009 United Nations Security Council election
- 2010 United Nations Security Council election
- 2011 United Nations Security Council election
- 2012 United Nations Security Council election
- 2013 United Nations Security Council election
- 2014 United Nations Security Council election
- 2015 United Nations Security Council election
- 2016 United Nations Security Council election
- 2017 United Nations Security Council election
- 2018 United Nations Security Council election
- 2019 United Nations Security Council election
- 2020 United Nations Security Council election
- 2021 United Nations Security Council election
- 2022 United Nations Security Council election
- 2023 United Nations Security Council election
- 2024 United Nations Security Council election
- 2025 United Nations Security Council election
- 2026 United Nations Security Council election
- 2027 United Nations Security Council election
