= 1970 United Nations Security Council election =

Election to the United Nations Security Council

← 1969	26 October 1970	1971 →

5 (of 10) non-permanent seats on the United Nations Security Council
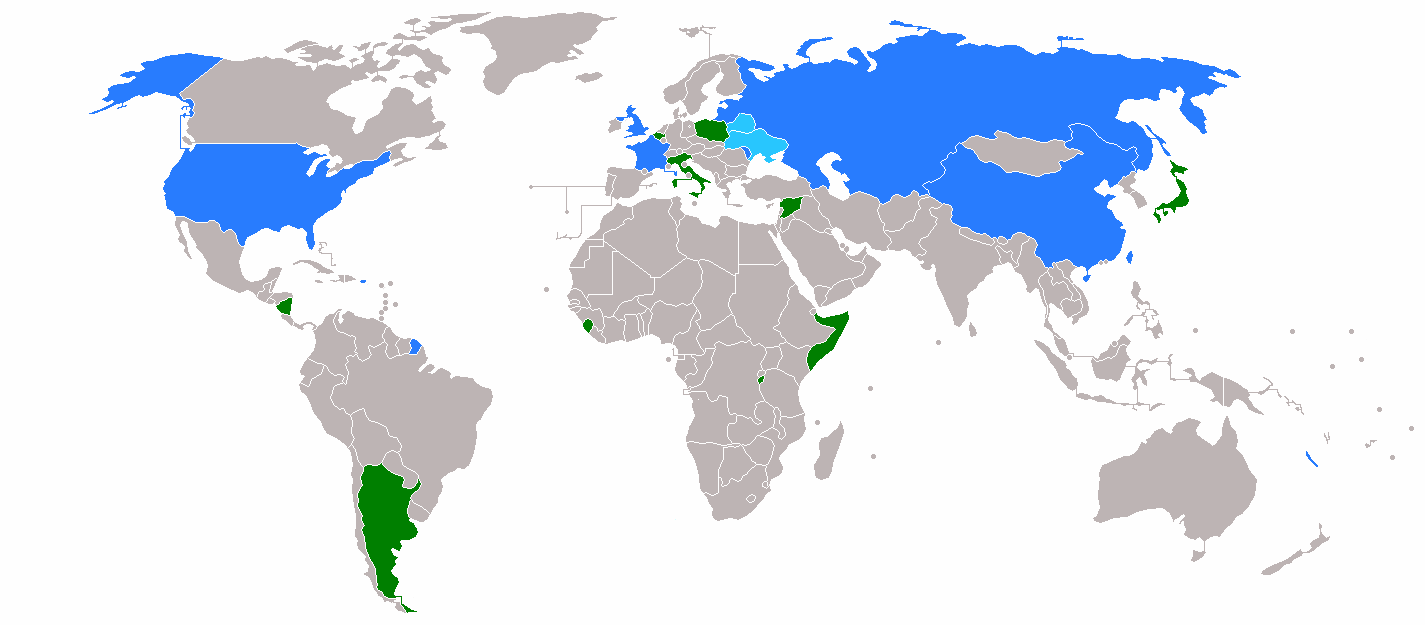
Members before election
Zambia (Africa)
Nepal (Asia)
Colombia (LatAm&Car)
Finland (WEOG)
Spain (WEOG)
New Members
Somalia (Africa)
Japan (Asia)
Argentina (LatAm&Car)
Belgium (WEOG)
Italy (WEOG)

The 1970 United Nations Security Council election was held on 26 October 1970 during the Twenty-fifth session of the United Nations General Assembly, held at United Nations Headquarters in New York City. The General Assembly elected Argentina, Belgium, Italy, Japan, and Somalia (for the first time), as the five new non-permanent members of the UN Security Council for two-year mandates commencing on 1 January 1971.

== Rules ==
The Security Council has 15 seats, filled by five permanent members and ten non-permanent members. Each year, half of the non-permanent members are elected for two-year terms. A sitting member may not immediately run for re-election.

In accordance with the rules whereby the ten non-permanent UNSC seats rotate among the various regional blocs into which UN member states traditionally divide themselves for voting and representation purposes, the five available seats are allocated as follows:

- One for African countries (held by Zambia)
- One for countries from the Asian Group (now called the Asia-Pacific Group) (held by Nepal)
- One for Latin America and the Caribbean (held by Colombia)
- Two for the Western European and Others Group (held by Finland and Spain)

To be elected, a candidate must receive a two-thirds majority of those present and voting. If the vote is inconclusive after the first round, three rounds of restricted voting shall take place, followed by three rounds of unrestricted voting, and so on, until a result has been obtained. In restricted voting, only official candidates may be voted on, while in unrestricted voting, any member of the given regional group, with the exception of current Council members, may be voted on.

== Result ==
The election was managed by then-President of the United Nations General Assembly Edvard Hambro of Norway. The United Nations had 127 member states at this time, with Fiji being admitted only three days before the election (for a timeline of UN membership, see Enlargement of the United Nations). There were no nomination prior to the vote. Delegates were to write the names of the five member states they wished elected on the ballot papers. Voting was conducted on a single ballot. Ballots containing more states from a certain region than seats allocated to that region were invalidated.

Member	Round 1
Argentina	109
Italy	108
Belgium	104
Somalia	104
Japan	102
Democratic Republic of the Congo	2
Austria	1
Burma	1
Fiji	1
Haiti	1
India	1
Luxembourg	1
Madagascar	1
Nigeria	1
Sweden	1
abstentions	0
invalid ballots	0
required majority	76
ballot papers	113

== See also ==
- List of members of the United Nations Security Council
- Japan and the United Nations
