= 2026 United Nations Security Council election =

- 3 June 2026

5 of 10 non-permanent seats on the United Nations Security Council
- United Nations Security Council membership after the election Permanent members Non-permanent members
- Outgoing members Somalia (Africa) Pakistan (Asia–Pacific) Panama (GRULAC) Denmark (WEOG) Greece (WEOG) Elected members Zimbabwe (Africa) Kyrgyzstan (Asia–Pacific) Trinidad and Tobago (GRULAC) Austria (WEOG) Portugal (WEOG)

- Unsuccessful candidates
- Philippines (Asia–Pacific)
- Germany (WEOG)

The 2026 United Nations Security Council election was held on 3 June 2026 during the 80th session of the United Nations General Assembly, held at United Nations Headquarters in New York City. The elections are for five non-permanent seats on the UN Security Council for two-year mandates commencing on 1 January 2027.

In accordance with the Security Council's rotation rules, whereby the ten non-permanent UNSC seats rotate among the various regional blocs into which UN member states traditionally divide themselves for voting and representation purposes, the five available seats are allocated as follows:

- One for the African Group
- One for the Asia-Pacific Group
- One for the Latin American and Caribbean Group
- Two for the Western European and Others Group

The five members will serve on the Security Council for the 2027–28 period.

== Candidates ==
=== African Group ===
- Zimbabwe

=== Asia-Pacific Group ===
- Philippines
- Kyrgyzstan

=== Latin American and Caribbean Group ===
- Trinidad and Tobago

=== Western European and Others Group ===
- Austria
- Portugal
- Germany

== Results ==
=== African and Asia-Pacific Groups ===
African and Asia-Pacific Groups election results
Member	Round 1
Zimbabwe	182
Kyrgyzstan	142
Philippines	49
valid ballots	191
abstentions	0
present and voting	191
required majority	128

=== Latin American and Caribbean Group ===
Latin American and Caribbean Group election results
Member	Round 1
Trinidad and Tobago	181
Guyana	1
valid ballots	191
abstentions	9
present and voting	182
required majority	122

=== Western European and Others Group ===
Western European and Others Group election results
Member	Round 1
Portugal	134
Austria	131
Germany	104
valid ballots	191
abstentions	1
present and voting	190
required majority	127

== See also ==
- List of members of the United Nations Security Council
- United Nations Security Council elections
