= 1973 United Nations Security Council election =

Election to the United Nations Security Council

← 1972	15 October 1973	1974 →

5 (of 10) non-permanent seats on the United Nations Security Council
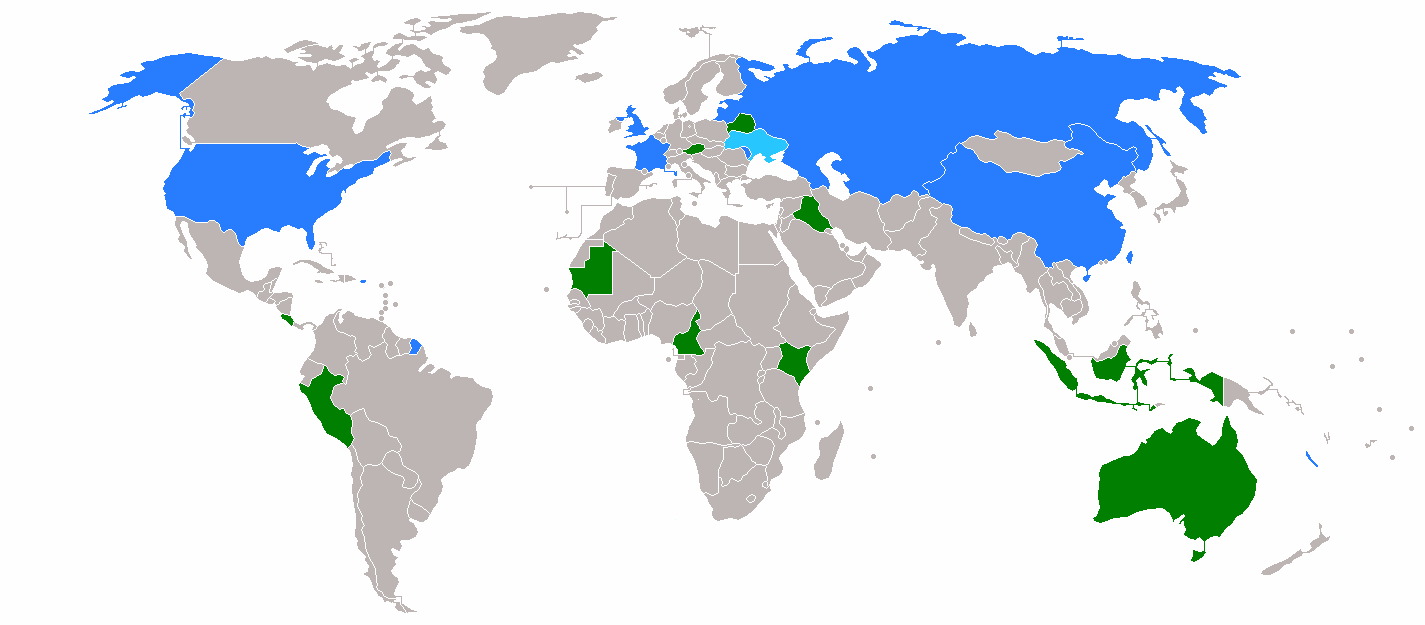
Members before election
Guinea (Africa)
Sudan (Africa, Arab)
India (Asia)
Panama (LatAm&Car)
Yugoslavia (E. Europe)
New Members
Cameroon (Africa)
Mauritania (Africa)
Iraq (Asia, Arab)
Costa Rica (LatAm&Car)
Byelorussian SSR (E. Europe)

The 1973 United Nations Security Council election was held on 15 October 1973 during the Twenty-eighth session of the United Nations General Assembly, held at United Nations Headquarters in New York City. The General Assembly elected the Byelorussian SSR, Cameroon, Costa Rica, Iraq, and Mauritania, as the five new non-permanent members of the UN Security Council for two-year mandates commencing on 1 January 1974. This was the first election of Cameroon, Costa Rica and Mauritania and the only election of Byelorussian SSR into the council.

== Rules ==
The Security Council has 15 seats, filled by five permanent members and ten non-permanent members. Each year, half of the non-permanent members are elected for two-year terms. A sitting member may not immediately run for re-election.

In accordance with the rules whereby the ten non-permanent UNSC seats rotate among the various regional blocs into which UN member states traditionally divide themselves for voting and representation purposes, the five available seats are allocated as follows:

- Two for African countries (held by Guinea and Sudan)
- One for the Asian Group (now the Asia-Pacific Group), for the "Arab Swing Seat" (held by India)
- One for Latin America and the Caribbean (held by Panama)
- One for the Eastern European Group (held by Yugoslavia)

To be elected, a candidate must receive a two-thirds majority of those present and voting. If the vote is inconclusive after the first round, three rounds of restricted voting shall take place, followed by three rounds of unrestricted voting, and so on, until a result has been obtained. In restricted voting, only official candidates may be voted on, while in unrestricted voting, any member of the given regional group, with the exception of current Council members, may be voted on.

== Candidates ==
Speaking as Chairmen of the Asian and African Groups respectively, Mr. Sharaf of Jordan endorsed Iraq, and Mr. Ramphul of Mauritius endorsed Mauritania and Cameroon as the official candidates of their respective regional groups.

== Result ==
The election was managed by then-President of the United Nations General Assembly Leopoldo Benites of Ecuador. The United Nations had 136 member states at this time (for a timeline of UN membership, see Enlargement of the United Nations). Delegates were to write the names of the five member states they wished elected on the ballot papers. Voting was conducted on a single ballot. There were 125 ballot papers.

Member	Round 1
Mauritania	120
Cameroon	120
Iraq	116
Byelorussian SSR	112
Costa Rica	104
Cuba	5
Jamaica	3
Romania	2
Honduras	1
Iran	1
Libya	1
abstentions	0
invalid ballots	0
required majority	84

== See also ==
- List of members of the United Nations Security Council
- Soviet Union and the United Nations
