= 1985 United Nations Security Council election =

Election to the United Nations Security Council

- 17 October 1985

5 of 10 non-permanent seats on the United Nations Security Council
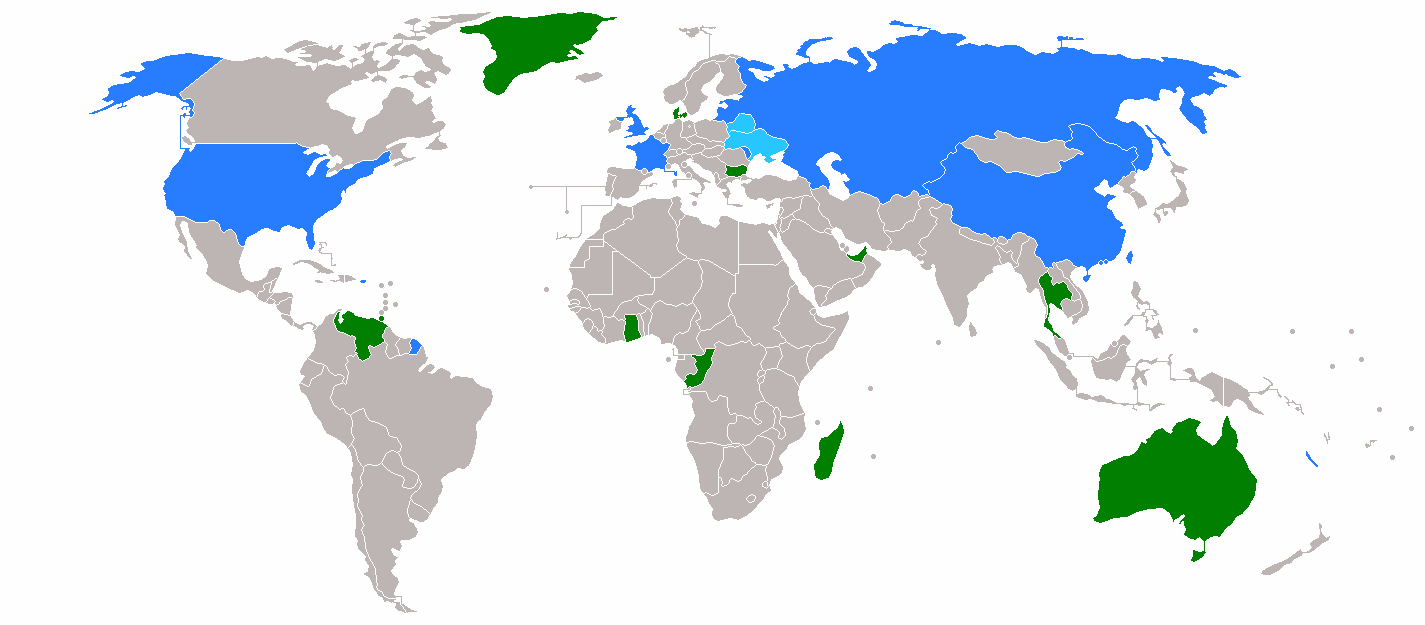
- United Nations Security Council membership after the election Permanent members Non-permanent members
- Outgoing members Upper Volta (Africa) Egypt (Africa)^{a} India (Asia) Peru (GRULAC) Ukrainian SSR (EEG) a. Arab state Elected members People's Republic of the Congo (Africa) Ghana (Africa) United Arab Emirates (Asia)^{a} Venezuela (GRULAC) Bulgaria (EEG)

The 1985 United Nations Security Council election was held on 17 October 1985 during the Fortieth session of the United Nations General Assembly, held at United Nations Headquarters in New York City. The General Assembly elected Bulgaria, Congo, Ghana, the United Arab Emirates, and Venezuela, as the five new non-permanent members of the UN Security Council for two-year mandates commencing on 1 January 1986. 1985 marks the first election of Congo and the United Arab Emirates to the Council.

== Rules ==
The Security Council has 15 seats, filled by five permanent members and ten non-permanent members. Each year, half of the non-permanent members are elected for two-year terms. A sitting member may not immediately run for re-election.

In accordance with the rules whereby the ten non-permanent UNSC seats rotate among the various regional blocs into which UN member states traditionally divide themselves for voting and representation purposes, the five available seats are allocated as follows:

- Two for African countries (held by Egypt and Upper Volta)
- One for the Asian Group (now the Asia-Pacific Group), for the "Arab Swing Seat" (held by India)
- One for Latin America and the Caribbean (held by Brazil)
- One for the Eastern European Group (held by Ukrainian SSR)

To be elected, a candidate must receive a two-thirds majority of those present and voting. If the vote is inconclusive after the first round, three rounds of restricted voting shall take place, followed by three rounds of unrestricted voting, and so on, until a result has been obtained. In restricted voting, only official candidates may be voted on, while in unrestricted voting, any member of the given regional group, with the exception of current Council members, may be voted on.

== Result ==
Voting was conducted on a single ballot. Ballots containing more states from a certain region than seats allocated to that region were invalidated.

Member	Round 1	Round 2	Round 3	Round 4
Bulgaria	135	—	—	—
People's Republic of the Congo	133	—	—	—
Venezuela	131	—	—	—
United Arab Emirates	126	—	—	—
Liberia	87	70	59	46
Ghana	45	81	94	109
Cameroon	7	—	—	—
East Germany	2	—	—	—
Pakistan	2	—	—	—
Syria	2	—	—	—
Bangladesh	1	—	—	—
Bolivia	1	—	—	—
Burundi	1	—	—	—
Cuba	1	—	—	—
Dominican Republic	1	—	—	—
Gabon	1	—	—	—
Jamaica	1	—	—	—
Japan	1	—	—	—
Mexico	1	—	—	—
Mozambique	1	—	—	—
abstentions	1	1	0	0
invalid ballots	1	4	1	1
required majority	98	101	102	104

== See also ==
- List of members of the United Nations Security Council
