= 1969 United Nations Security Council election =

Election to the United Nations Security Council

← 1968	20 October 1969	1970 →

5 (of 10) non-permanent seats on the United Nations Security Council
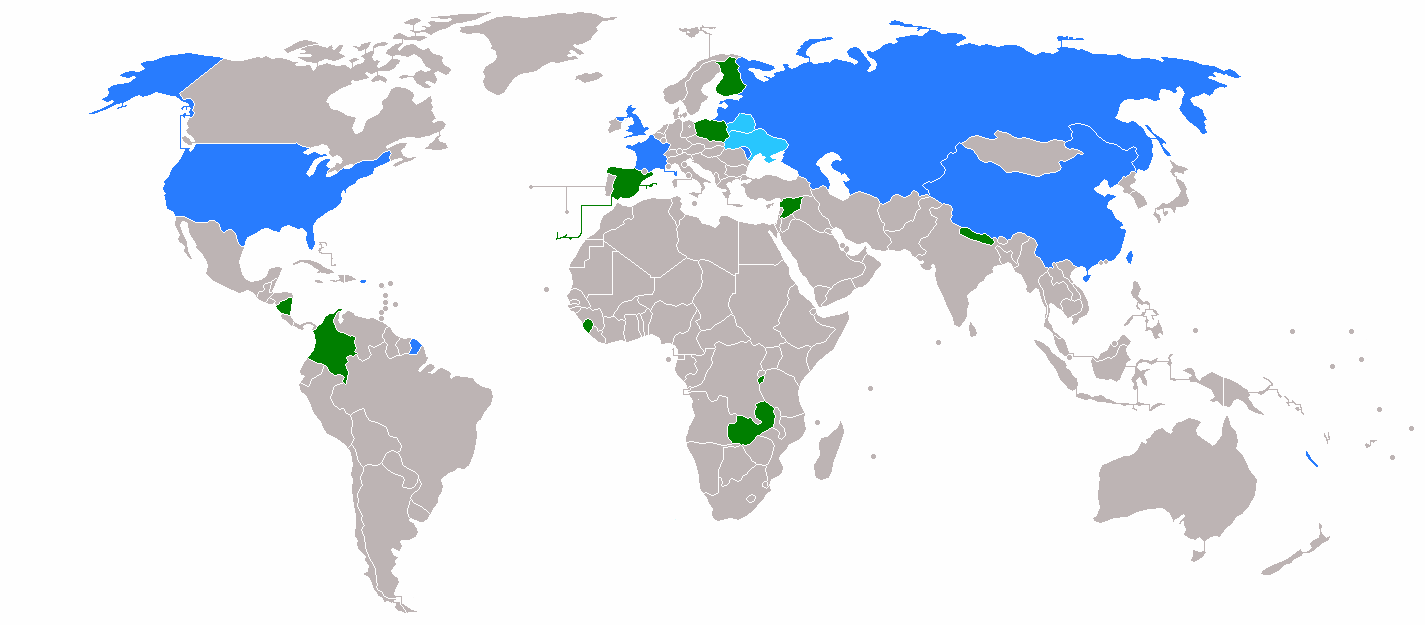
Members before election
- Senegal (Africa)
- Algeria (Africa, Arab)
- Pakistan (Asia)
- Paraguay (LatAm&Car)
- Hungary (E. Europe)
New Members
- Burundi (Africa)
- Sierra Leone (Africa)
- Syria (Asia, Arab)
- Nicaragua (LatAm&Car)
- Poland (E. Europe)

The 1969 United Nations Security Council election was held on 20 October 1969 during the Twenty-fourth session of the United Nations General Assembly, held at United Nations Headquarters in New York City. The General Assembly elected the Burundi, Nicaragua, Poland, Sierra Leone, and Syria, as the five new non-permanent members of the UN Security Council for two-year mandates commencing on 1 January 1970. It was the first time Burundi, Nicaragua and Sierra Leone were elected members of the council.

== Rules ==
The Security Council has 15 seats, filled by five permanent members and ten non-permanent members. Each year, half of the non-permanent members are elected for two-year terms. A sitting member may not immediately run for re-election.

In accordance with the rules whereby the ten non-permanent UNSC seats rotate among the various regional blocs into which UN member states traditionally divide themselves for voting and representation purposes, the five available seats are allocated as follows:

- Two for African countries (held by Senegal and Algeria)
- One for the Asian Group (now the Asia-Pacific Group), for the "Arab Swing Seat" (held by Pakistan)
- One for Latin America and the Caribbean (held by Paraguay)
- One for the Eastern European Group (held by Hungary)

To be elected, a candidate must receive a two-thirds majority of those present and voting. If the vote is inconclusive after the first round, three rounds of restricted voting shall take place, followed by three rounds of unrestricted voting, and so on, until a result has been obtained. In restricted voting, only official candidates may be voted on, while in unrestricted voting, any member of the given regional group, with the exception of current Council members, may be voted on.

== Result ==
The election was managed by then-President of the United Nations General Assembly Angie Brooks of Liberia. The United Nations had 126 member states at this time (for a timeline of UN membership, see Enlargement of the United Nations). There were no nomination prior to the vote. Delegates were to write the names of the five member states they wished elected on the ballot papers. Voting was conducted on a single ballot. There was a total of 126 ballot papers.

Member	Round 1
Poland	121
Burundi	118
Sierra Leone	117
Nicaragua	103
Syria	101
Cuba	6
Peru	3
Togo	3
Lebanon	2
Tunisia	2
Botswana	1
Brazil	1
Haiti	1
Iraq	1
Israel	1
Japan	1
Jordan	1
Kenya	1
Mali	1
Mongolia	1
Panama	1
United Arab Republic	1
Tanzania	1
Yugoslavia	1
abstentions	0
invalid ballots	0
required majority	84

== See also ==
- List of members of the United Nations Security Council
