= 1971 United Nations Security Council election =

Election to the United Nations Security Council

← 1970	23 November 1971	1972 →

5 (of 10) non-permanent seats on the United Nations Security Council
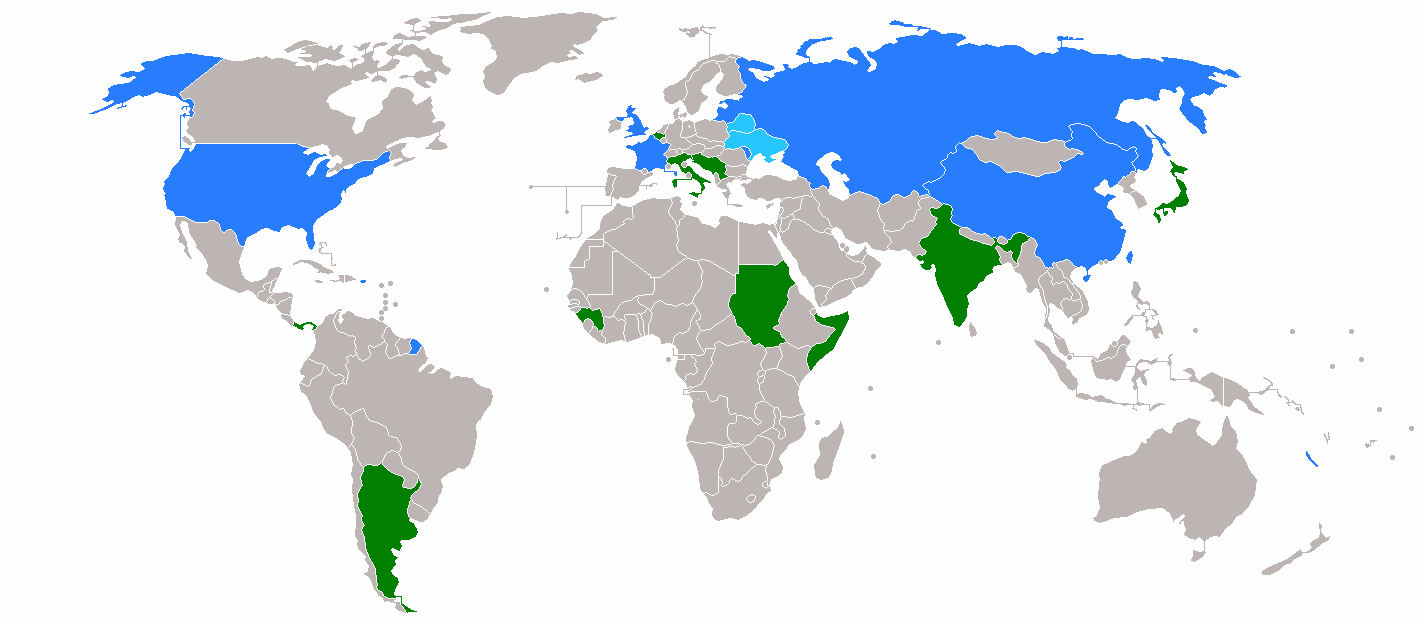
Members before election
Burundi (Africa)
Sierra Leone (Africa)
Syria (Asia, Arab)
Nicaragua (LatAm&Car)
Poland (E. Europe)
New Members
Guinea (Africa)
Sudan (Africa, Arab)
India (Asia)
Panama (LatAm&Car)
Yugoslavia (E. Europe)

The 1971 United Nations Security Council election was held on 23 November 1971 during the Twenty-sixth session of the United Nations General Assembly, held at United Nations Headquarters in New York City. The General Assembly elected Guinea, India, Panama, Sudan, and Yugoslavia, as the five new non-permanent members of the UN Security Council for two-year mandates commencing on 1 January 1972. It was the first election of Guinea and Sudan into the council.

== Rules ==
The Security Council has 15 seats, filled by five permanent members and ten non-permanent members. Each year, half of the non-permanent members are elected for two-year terms. A sitting member may not immediately run for re-election.

In accordance with the rules whereby the ten non-permanent UNSC seats rotate among the various regional blocs into which UN member states traditionally divide themselves for voting and representation purposes, the five available seats are allocated as follows:

- Two for African countries, one of which being the "Arab Swing Seat" (held by Burundi and Sierra Leone)
- One for the Asian Group (now the Asia-Pacific Group) (held by Syria)
- One for Latin America and the Caribbean (held by Nicaragua)
- One for the Eastern European Group (held by Poland)

To be elected, a candidate must receive a two-thirds majority of those present and voting. If the vote is inconclusive after the first round, three rounds of restricted voting shall take place, followed by three rounds of unrestricted voting, and so on, until a result has been obtained. In restricted voting, only official candidates may be voted on, while in unrestricted voting, any member of the given regional group, with the exception of current Council members, may be voted on.

== Result ==
The election was managed by then-President of the United Nations General Assembly Adam Malik of Indonesia. The United Nations had 131 member states at this time (for a timeline of UN membership, see Enlargement of the United Nations). There were no nomination prior to the vote. Delegates were to write the names of the five member states they wished elected on the ballot papers. Voting was conducted on a single ballot. 116 ballot papers were used.

Member	Round 1
Yugoslavia	112
Sudan	111
Guinea	109
Panama	108
India	107
Peru	2
Chile	1
Ethiopia	1
Fiji	1
Israel	1
Pakistan	1
Tunisia	1
abstentions	0
invalid ballots	0
required majority	78

== See also ==
- List of members of the United Nations Security Council
- India and the United Nations
