= 1989 United Nations Security Council election =

Election to the United Nations Security Council

- 18 October 1989

5 of 10 non-permanent seats on the United Nations Security Council
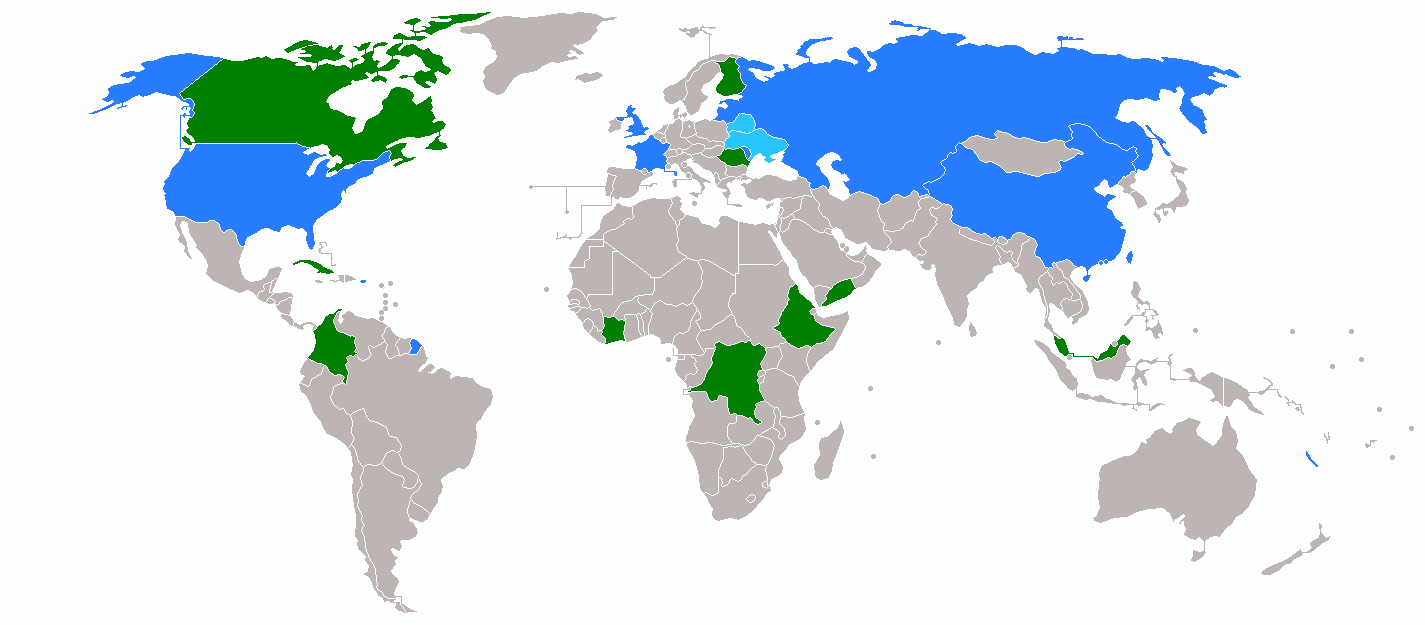
- United Nations Security Council membership after the election Permanent members Non-permanent members
- Outgoing members Senegal (Africa) Algeria (Africa)^{a} Nepal (Asia) Brazil (GRULAC) Yugoslavia (EEG) a. Arab state Elected members Ivory Coast (Africa) Zaire (Africa) South Yemen (Asia)^{a} Cuba (GRULAC) Romania (EEG)

The 1989 United Nations Security Council election was held on 18 October 1989 during the Forty-fourth session of the United Nations General Assembly, held at UN Headquarters in New York City. The General Assembly elected Côte d'Ivoire, Cuba, Romania, South Yemen, and Zaire, as the five new non-permanent members of the UN Security Council for two-year mandates commencing on 1 January 1990. This was the first time Yemen was elected to the Council, as Yemeni unification occurred during South Yemen membership.

== Rules ==
The Security Council has 15 seats, filled by five permanent members and ten non-permanent members. Each year, half of the non-permanent members are elected for two-year terms. A sitting member may not immediately run for re-election.

In accordance with the rules whereby the ten non-permanent UNSC seats rotate among the various regional blocs into which UN member states traditionally divide themselves for voting and representation purposes, the five available seats are allocated as follows:

- Two for African countries (held by Algeria and the Senegal)
- One for the Asian Group (now the Asia-Pacific Group), for the "Arab Swing Seat" (held by Nepal)
- One for Latin America and the Caribbean (held by Brazil)
- One for the Eastern European Group (held by Yugoslavia)

To be elected, a candidate must receive a two-thirds majority of those present and voting. If the vote is inconclusive after the first round, three rounds of restricted voting shall take place, followed by three rounds of unrestricted voting, and so on, until a result has been obtained. In restricted voting, only official candidates may be voted on, while in unrestricted voting, any member of the given regional group, with the exception of current Council members, may be voted on.

== Endorsed candidates ==
Prior to the actual vote at the General Assembly, the Permanent representatives of Bangladesh, Belarus, Peru, and Kenya as chairmen of the regional groups told the Assembly what countries enjoyed the endorsement of their respective regions. The chairmen endorsed South Yemen, Romania, Cuba, and Côte d'Ivoire and Zaire respectively.

== Result ==
Voting was conducted on a single ballot. Ballots containing more states from a certain region than seats allocated to that region were invalidated. There was a total of 161 ballot papers.

Member	Round 1
Cuba	146
South Yemen	140
Romania	136
Ivory Coast	135
Zaire	128
North Yemen	6
Argentina	1
Barbados	1
Costa Rica	1
Ghana	1
India	1
Mali	1
Niger	1
Poland	1
Zambia	1
abstentions	0
invalid ballots	0
required majority	104

== See also ==
- List of members of the United Nations Security Council
