= 1972 United Nations Security Council election =

Election to the United Nations Security Council

← 1971	20 October 1972	1973 →

5 (of 10) non-permanent seats on the United Nations Security Council
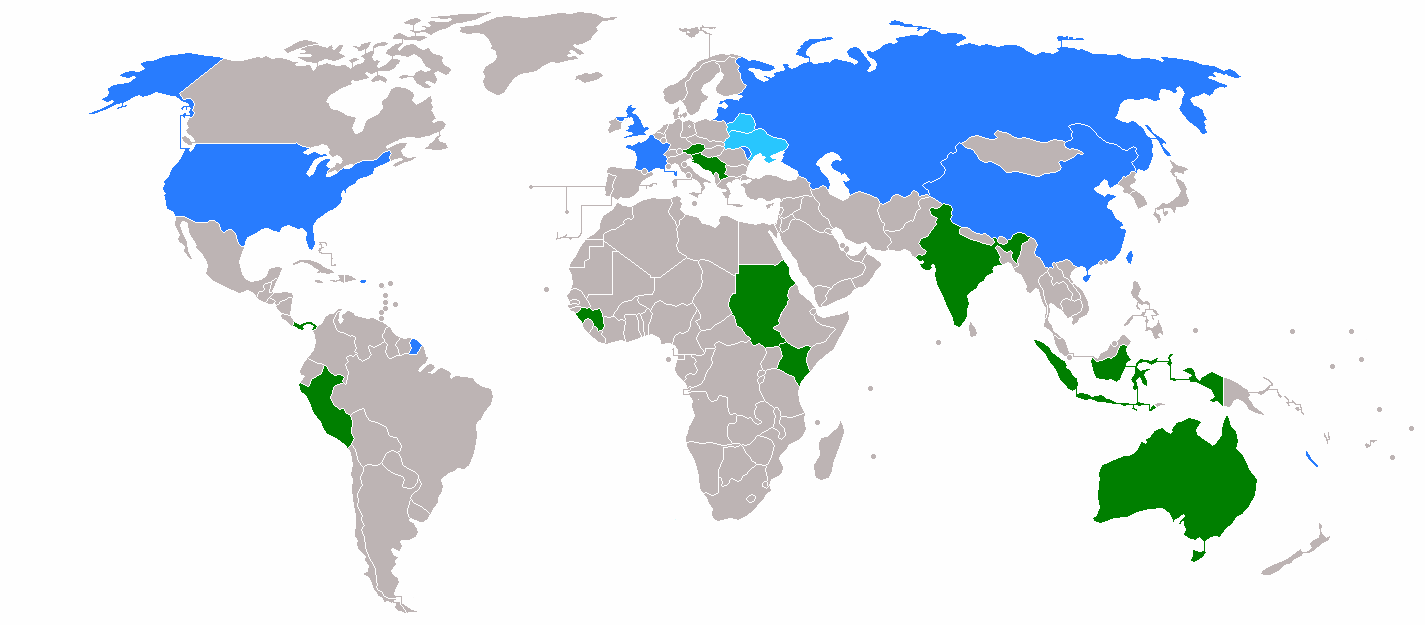
Members before election
Somalia (Africa)
Japan (Asia)
Argentina (LatAm&Car)
Belgium (WEOG)
Italy (WEOG)
New Members
Kenya (Africa)
Indonesia (Asia)
Peru (LatAm&Car)
Australia (WEOG)
Austria (WEOG)

The 1972 United Nations Security Council election was held on 20 October 1972 during the Twenty-seventh session of the United Nations General Assembly, held at United Nations Headquarters in New York City. The General Assembly elected Australia, Austria, Indonesia, Kenya, and Peru, as the five new non-permanent members of the UN Security Council for two-year mandates commencing on 1 January 1973. In addition, Austria, Indonesia and Kenya were elected into the council for the first time.

== Rules ==
The Security Council has 15 seats, filled by five permanent members and ten non-permanent members. Each year, half of the non-permanent members are elected for two-year terms. A sitting member may not immediately run for re-election.

In accordance with the rules whereby the ten non-permanent UNSC seats rotate among the various regional blocs into which UN member states traditionally divide themselves for voting and representation purposes, the five available seats are allocated as follows:

- One for African countries (held by Somalia)
- One for countries from the Asian Group (now called the Asia-Pacific Group) (held by Japan)
- One for Latin America and the Caribbean (held by Argentina)
- Two for the Western European and Others Group (held by Belgium and Italy)

To be elected, a candidate must receive a two-thirds majority of those present and voting. If the vote is inconclusive after the first round, three rounds of restricted voting shall take place, followed by three rounds of unrestricted voting, and so on, until a result has been obtained. In restricted voting, only official candidates may be voted on, while in unrestricted voting, any member of the given regional group, with the exception of current Council members, may be voted on.

== Result ==
The election was managed by then-President of the United Nations General Assembly Stanisław Trepczyński of Poland. The United Nations had 132 member states at this time (for a timeline of UN membership, see Enlargement of the United Nations). There were no nomination prior to the vote. Delegates were to write the names of the five member states they wished elected on the ballot papers. Voting was conducted on a single ballot. Ballots containing more states from a certain region than seats allocated to that region were invalidated.

Member	Round 1
Peru	116
Austria	115
Indonesia	115
Kenya	112
Australia	109
Haiti	1
Pakistan	1
abstentions	0
invalid ballots	0
required majority	79
ballot papers	118

== See also ==
- List of members of the United Nations Security Council
- Australia and the United Nations
- Indonesia and the United Nations
