= 1981 United Nations Security Council election =

Election to the United Nations Security Council

- 15 October 1981

5 of 10 non-permanent seats on the United Nations Security Council
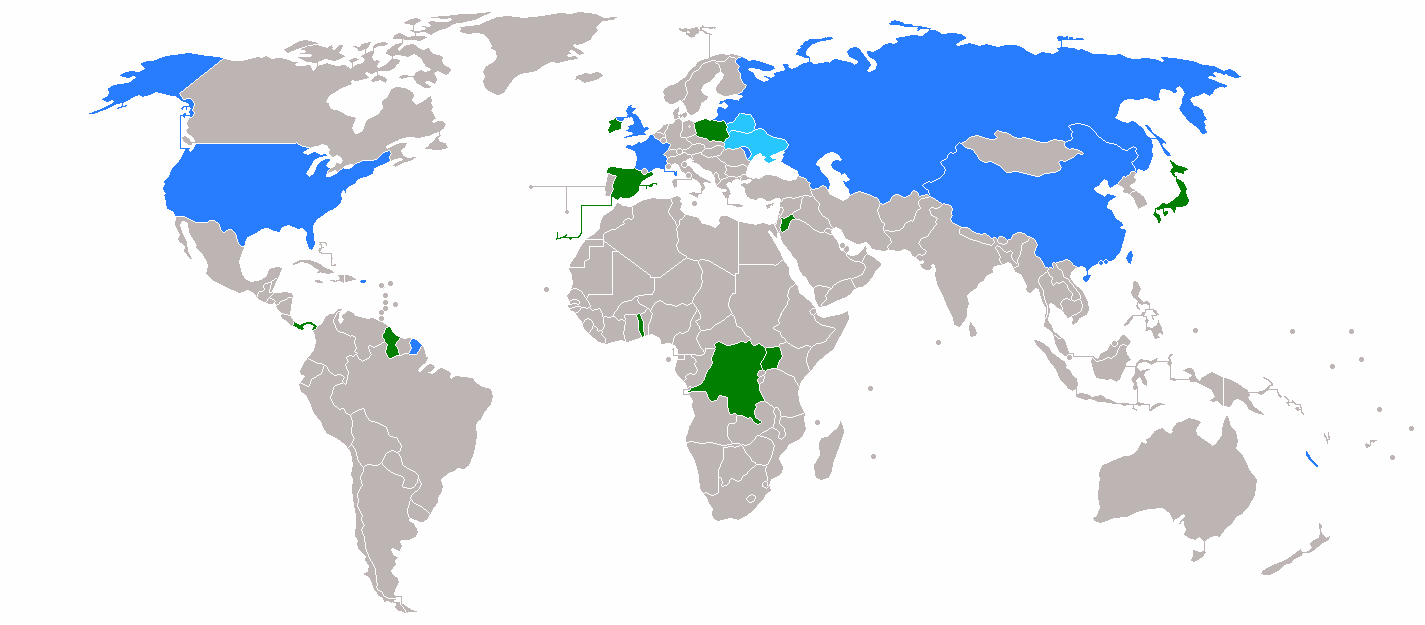
- United Nations Security Council membership after the election Permanent members Non-permanent members
- Outgoing members Niger (Africa) Tunisia (Africa)^{a} Philippines (Asia) Mexico (GRULAC) East Germany (EEG) a. Arab state Elected members Togo (Africa) Zaire (Africa) Jordan (Asia)^{a} Guyana (GRULAC) Poland (EEG)

The 1981 United Nations Security Council election was held on 15 October 1981 during the Thirty-sixth session of the United Nations General Assembly, held at United Nations Headquarters in New York City. The General Assembly elected Guyana, Jordan, Poland, Togo, and Zaire (now D.R. Congo), as the five new non-permanent members of the UN Security Council for two-year mandates commencing on 1 January 1982. Togo and Zaire were elected for the first time.

== Rules ==
The Security Council has 15 seats, filled by five permanent members and ten non-permanent members. Each year, half of the non-permanent members are elected for two-year terms. A sitting member may not immediately run for re-election.

In accordance with the rules whereby the ten non-permanent UNSC seats rotate among the various regional blocs into which UN member states traditionally divide themselves for voting and representation purposes, the five available seats are allocated as follows:

- Two for African countries (held by Niger and Tunisia)
- One for the Asian Group (now the Asia-Pacific Group), for the "Arab Swing Seat" (held by the Philippines)
- One for Latin America and the Caribbean (held by Mexico)
- One for the Eastern European Group (held by East Germany)

To be elected, a candidate must receive a two-thirds majority of those present and voting. If the vote is inconclusive after the first round, three rounds of restricted voting shall take place, followed by three rounds of unrestricted voting, and so on, until a result has been obtained. In restricted voting, only official candidates may be voted on, while in unrestricted voting, any member of the given regional group, with the exception of current Council members, may be voted on.

== Result ==
Voting was conducted on a single ballot. Ballots containing more states from a certain region than seats allocated to that region were invalidated.

Member	Round 1
Togo	141
Guyana	140
Jordan	140
Zaire	140
Poland	139
Romania	5
Dominican Republic	3
Angola	2
Cuba	2
Mozambique	2
Algeria	1
Ethiopia	1
Hungary	1
Mongolia	1
Pakistan	1
Peru	1
Saint Lucia	1
Senegal	1
Singapore	1
Yugoslavia	1
abstentions	0
invalid ballots	0
required majority	102

== See also ==
- List of members of the United Nations Security Council
