= 1967 United Nations Security Council election =

Election to the United Nations Security Council

← 1966	6 November 1967	1968 →

5 (of 10) non-permanent seats on the United Nations Security Council
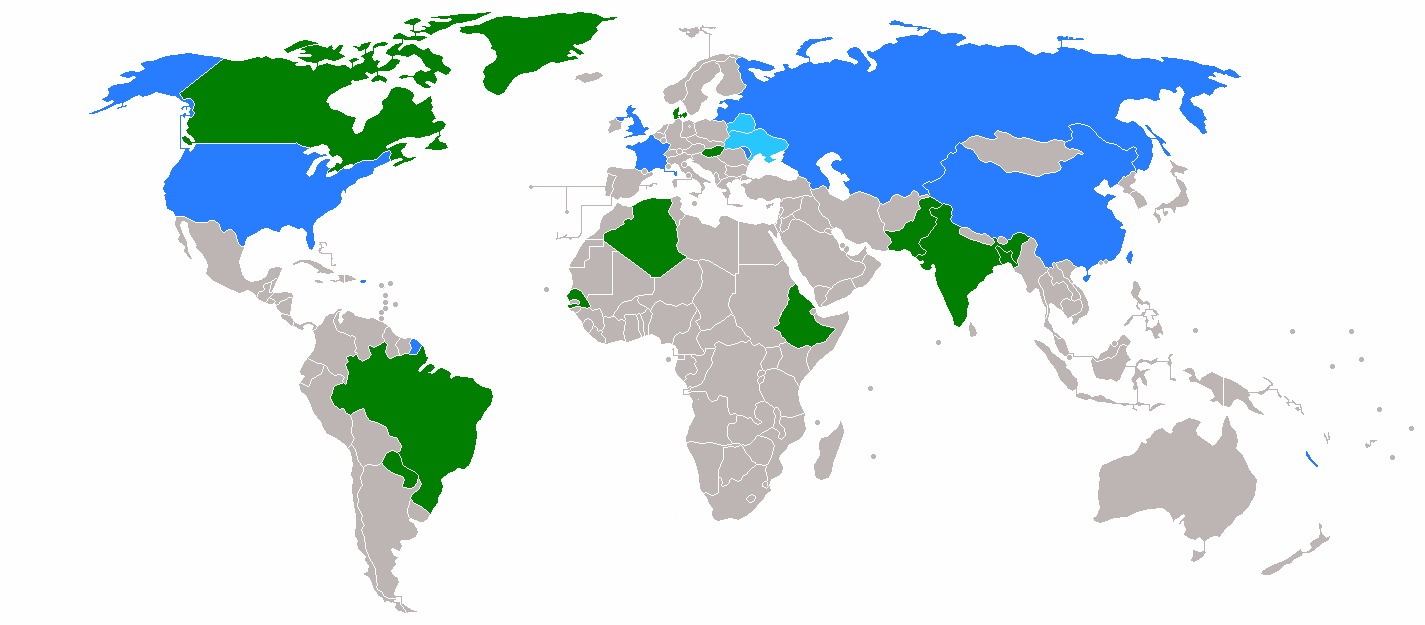
Members before election
Mali (Africa)
Nigeria (Africa)
Japan (Asia)
Argentina (LatAm&Car)
Bulgaria (E. Europe)
New Members
Senegal (Africa)
Algeria (Africa, Arab)
Pakistan (Asia)
Paraguay (LatAm&Car)
Hungary (E. Europe)

The 1967 United Nations Security Council election was held on 6 November 1967 during the Twenty-second session of the United Nations General Assembly, held at United Nations Headquarters in New York City. The General Assembly elected Algeria, Hungary, Pakistan, Paraguay, and Senegal, as the five new non-permanent members of the UN Security Council for two-year mandates commencing on 1 January 1968. Algeria and Senegal saw their first election into the council.

== Rules ==
A sitting member may not immediately run for re-election.

In accordance with the rules whereby the ten non-permanent UNSC seats rotate among the various regional blocs into which UN member states traditionally divide themselves for voting and representation purposes, the five available seats are allocated as follows:

- Two for African countries, one of which being the "Arab Swing Seat" (held by Mali and Nigeria)
- One for the Asian Group (now the Asia-Pacific Group) (held by Japan)
- One for Latin America and the Caribbean (held by Argentina)
- One for the Eastern European Group (held by Bulgaria)

To be elected, a candidate must receive a two-thirds majority of those present and voting. If the vote is inconclusive after the first round, three rounds of restricted voting shall take place, followed by three rounds of unrestricted voting, and so on, until a result has been obtained. In restricted voting, only official candidates may be voted on, while in unrestricted voting, any member of the given regional group, with the exception of current Council members, may be voted on.

Member	Round 1
Pakistan	118
Senegal	110
Algeria	108
Hungary	105
Paraguay	101
Romania	3
Albania	2
Tunisia	2
Uruguay	2
Chile	1
Cyprus	1
Republic of the Congo	1
Democratic Republic of the Congo	1
Cuba	1
Dahomey	1
Ecuador	1
Madagascar	1
Malawi	1
Morocco	1
Peru	1
Yugoslavia	1
abstentions	0
invalid ballots	0
required majority	79

== See also ==
- List of members of the United Nations Security Council
- Pakistan and the United Nations
