= 1994 United Nations Security Council election =

Election to the United Nations Security Council

- 20 October 1994

5 of 10 non-permanent seats on the United Nations Security Council
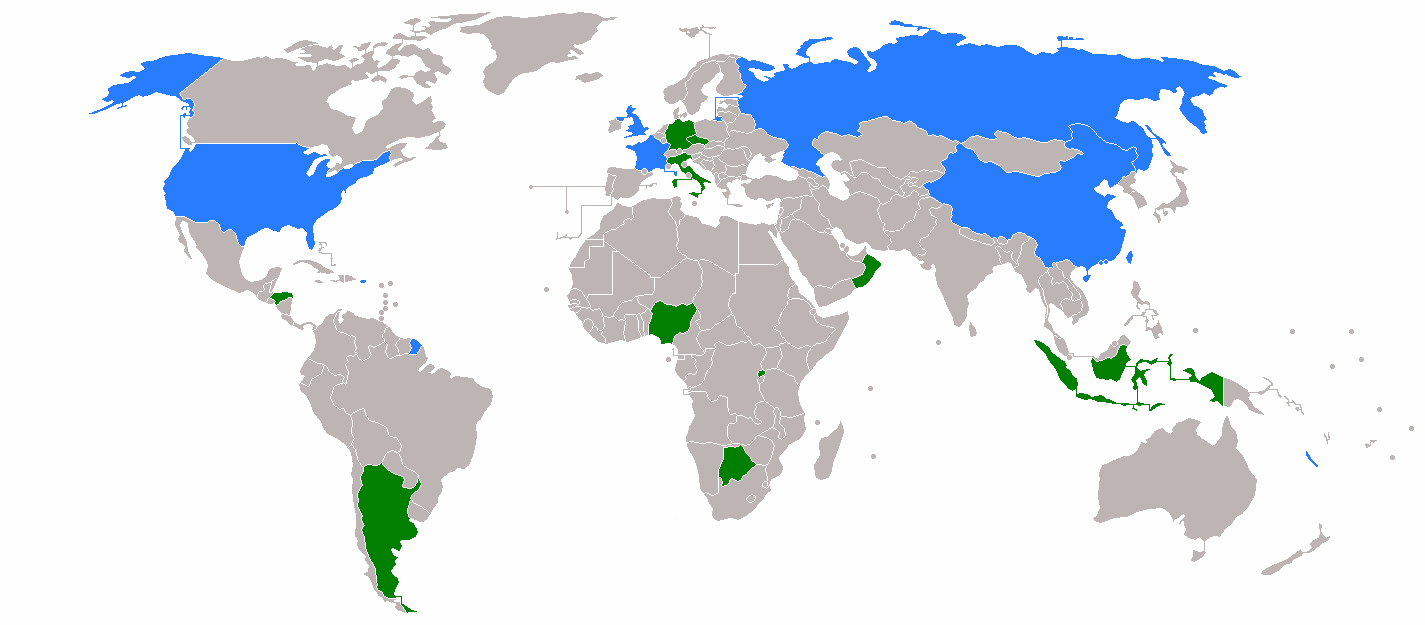
- United Nations Security Council membership after the election Permanent members Non-permanent members
- Outgoing members Djibouti (Africa) Pakistan (Asia) Brazil (GRULAC) New Zealand (WEOG) Spain (WEOG) Elected members Botswana (Africa) Indonesia (Asia) Honduras (GRULAC) Germany (WEOG) Italy (WEOG)

The 1994 United Nations Security Council election was held on 20 October 1994 during the Forty-ninth session of the United Nations General Assembly, held at United Nations Headquarters in New York City. The General Assembly elected Botswana, Germany, Honduras, Indonesia, and Italy, as the five new non-permanent members of the UN Security Council for two-year mandates commencing on 1 January 1995. Both Botswana and Honduras were elected for the first time, whereas Germany was elected for the first time since German reunification.

== Rules ==
The Security Council has 15 seats, filled by five permanent members and ten non-permanent members. Each year, half of the non-permanent members are elected for two-year terms. A sitting member may not immediately run for re-election.

In accordance with the rules whereby the ten non-permanent UNSC seats rotate among the various regional blocs into which UN member states traditionally divide themselves for voting and representation purposes, the five available seats are allocated as follows:

- One for African countries (held by Djibouti)
- One for countries from the Asian Group (now the Asia-Pacific Group) (held by Pakistan)
- One for Latin America and the Caribbean (held by Brazil)
- Two for the Western European and Others Group (held by New Zealand and Spain)

To be elected, a candidate must receive a two-thirds majority of those present and voting. If the vote is inconclusive after the first round, three rounds of restricted voting shall take place, followed by three rounds of unrestricted voting, and so on, until a result has been obtained. In restricted voting, only official candidates may be voted on, while in unrestricted voting, any member of the given regional group, with the exception of current Council members, may be voted on.

== Endorsed candidates ==
The Chairpersons of the respective Regional Groups made known their endorsements of the candidate nations prior to the vote. Mr. Jallow of the Gambia gave the endorsement of the African Group to Botswana. Mr. Slade of Samoa gave the endorsement of the Asian Group to Indonesia. Mr. Fernandez Estigarribia of Paraguay gave the endorsement of the Latin American and Caribbean Group to Honduras. Mrs. Fréchette, the then-Permanent Representative of Canada to the United Nations, gave the endorsement of the Western European and Others Group to Germany and Italy.

== Result ==
170 ballot papers were distributed for all voting.

=== African Group ===
African and Asian States election results
Member	Round 1
Botswana	168
Indonesia	164
Gabon	1
Japan	1
abstentions	0
invalid ballots	0
required majority	114

=== Latin American and Caribbean Group ===
Latin American and Caribbean Group election results
Member	Round 1
Honduras	170
abstentions	0
invalid ballots	0
required majority	114

=== Western European and Other Group ===
Western European and Other Group election results
Member	Round 1
Italy	167
Germany	164
Australia	1
abstentions	0
invalid ballots	0
required majority	114

== See also ==
- List of members of the United Nations Security Council
- Germany and the United Nations
- Indonesia and the United Nations
- European Union and the United Nations
