= 2001 United Nations Security Council election =

Election to the United Nations Security Council

- 8 October 2001

5 of 10 non-permanent seats on the United Nations Security Council
- United Nations Security Council membership after the election Permanent members Non-permanent members
- Outgoing members Mali (Africa) Tunisia (Africa)^{a} Bangladesh (Asia) Jamaica (GRULAC) Ukraine (EEG) a. Arab state Elected members Cameroon (Africa) Guinea (Africa) Syria (Asia)^{a} Mexico (GRULAC) Bulgaria (EEG)

- Unsuccessful candidates
- Dominican Republic (GRULAC)
- Belarus (EEG)

The 2001 United Nations Security Council election was held on 8 October 2001 at United Nations Headquarters in New York City during the 56th session of the United Nations General Assembly. The General Assembly elected five non-permanent members of the UN Security Council for two-year terms commencing on 1 January 2002.

The five candidates elected were Bulgaria, Cameroon, Guinea, Mexico, and Syria.

== Geographic distribution ==
In accordance with the General Assembly's rules for the geographic distribution of the non-permanent members of the Security Council, and established practice, the members were to be elected as follows: two from Africa, one from Asia, one from Latin American and the Caribbean Group (GRULAC), and one from the Eastern European Group.

== Candidates ==
There was a total of seven candidates for the five seats. In the African and Asian Groups, there were three candidates for the three seats: Cameroon, Guinea, and Syria. In the Eastern European Group, Belarus and Bulgaria competed for the one available seat. From the GRULAC states, the Dominican Republic and Mexico competed for the one available seat.

== Results ==
Voting proceeded by secret ballot. For each geographic group, each member state could vote for as many candidates as were to be elected. There were 178 ballots in each of the three elections.

=== Group A — African and Asian States (three to be elected) ===
- Guinea 173
- Cameroon 172
- Syria 160
- invalid 1

=== Group B — Latin American and Caribbean States (one to be elected) ===
- Mexico 116
- Dominican Republic 60
- Dominica 1
- invalid 1

Second Round

- Mexico 138
- Dominican Republic 40

=== Group C — Eastern European Group (one to be elected) ===
- Bulgaria 120
- Belarus 53

With Bulgaria winning over Belarus, and Mexico overcoming the Dominican Republic in the second round, the final result was as follows: Bulgaria, Cameroon, Guinea, Mexico, and Syria were elected to the Security Council for two-year terms commencing 1 January 2002.

== See also ==
- List of members of the United Nations Security Council
- Mexico and the United Nations
