= 2003 United Nations Security Council election =

Election to the United Nations Security Council

- 23 October 2003

5 of 10 non-permanent seats on the United Nations Security Council
- United Nations Security Council membership after the election Permanent members Non-permanent members
- Outgoing members Cameroon (Africa) Guinea (Africa) Syria (Asia)^{a} Mexico (GRULAC) Bulgaria (EEG) a. Arab state Elected members Benin (Africa) Algeria (Africa)^{a} Philippines (Asia) Brazil (GRULAC) Romania (EEG)

The 2003 United Nations Security Council election was held on 23 October 2003 at United Nations Headquarters in New York City during the 58th session of the United Nations General Assembly. The General Assembly elected five non-permanent members of the UN Security Council for two-year terms commencing on 1 January 2004.

The five candidates elected were Algeria, Benin, Brazil, Philippines, and Romania.

== Geographic distribution ==
In accordance with the General Assembly's rules for the geographic distribution of the non-permanent members of the Security Council, and established practice, the members were to be elected as follows: two from Africa, one from Asia, one from Eastern Europe, and one from Latin American and the Caribbean.

== Candidates ==
There were only five declared candidates for the five seats available. Thus they easily obtained the required 2/3 majority in the General Assembly.

== Results ==
Voting proceeded by secret ballot. For each geographic group, each member state could vote for as many candidates as were to be elected. There were 182 ballots in each of the three elections. Two member states were not given ballot papers because they were in arrears of their UN member contributions.

=== Group A — African and Asian States (three to be elected) ===
- Benin 181
- Philippines 179
- Algeria 178
- Republic of Korea 1

=== Group B — Eastern European States (one to be elected) ===
- Romania 174
- Poland 1
- abstentions 7

=== Group C — Latin American and Caribbean States (one to be elected) ===
- Brazil 177
- Argentina 1
- abstentions 4

== See also ==
- List of members of the United Nations Security Council
- Brazil and the United Nations
- Philippines and the United Nations
