= 2023 United Nations Security Council election =

Election to the United Nations Security Council

- 6 June 2023

5 of 10 non-permanent seats on the United Nations Security Council
- United Nations Security Council membership after the election Permanent members Non-permanent members
- Outgoing members Gabon (Africa) Ghana (Africa) United Arab Emirates (Asia–Pacific)^{a} Brazil (GRULAC) Albania (EEG) a. Arab state Elected members Sierra Leone (Africa) Algeria (Africa)^{a} South Korea (Asia–Pacific) Guyana (GRULAC) Slovenia (EEG)

The 2023 United Nations Security Council election was held on 6 June 2023 during the 77th session of the United Nations General Assembly, held at United Nations Headquarters in New York City. The elections were for five non-permanent seats on the UN Security Council for two-year mandates commencing on 1 January 2024. In accordance with the Security Council's rotation rules, whereby the ten non-permanent UNSC seats rotate among the various regional blocs into which UN member states traditionally divide themselves for voting and representation purposes, the five available seats were allocated as follows:

- Two for the African Group
- One for the Asia-Pacific Group
- One for the Latin American and Caribbean Group
- One for the Eastern European Group

The five members served on the Security Council for the 2024–25 period.

== Candidates ==
=== African Group ===
The candidates for two available positions were:

- Algeria
- Sierra Leone

=== Asia-Pacific Group ===
The candidates for one available position were:

- Republic of Korea

==== Withdrawn ====
- Tajikistan — Withdrew in September 2022

=== Latin American and Caribbean Group ===
The candidate for one available position was:

- Guyana

=== Eastern European Group ===
The candidates for one available position were:

- Belarus
- Slovenia
  - P5 Endorsements: United States

== Result ==
=== African and Asia-Pacific Groups ===
African and Asia-Pacific Groups election results
Member	Round 1
Sierra Leone	188
Algeria	184
South Korea	180
valid ballots	192
abstentions	0
present and voting	192
required majority	128

=== Latin American and Caribbean Group ===
Latin American and Caribbean Group election results
Member	Round 1
Guyana	191
valid ballots	192
abstentions	1
present and voting	191
required majority	128

=== Eastern European Group ===
Eastern European Group election results
Member	Round 1
Slovenia	153
Belarus	38
valid ballots	192
abstentions	1
present and voting	191
required majority	128

== See also ==
- List of members of the United Nations Security Council
