= 1959 United Nations Security Council election =

Election to the United Nations Security Council

- 12 October & 12 December 1959

three of six non-permanent seats on the United Nations Security Council
Members before election
Japan (Asia)
Canada (WEOG)
Panama (LatAm&Car)
New Members
Ecuador (LatAm&Car)
Ceylon (Asia)
Turkey (WEOG)

The 1959 United Nations Security Council election was held between 12 October and 12 December during the fourteenth session of the United Nations General Assembly, held at United Nations Headquarters in New York City. The General Assembly elected three members through consultation of the president, as non-permanent members of the UN Security Council for two-year mandates commencing on 1 January 1960.

== Rules ==
The Security Council had 11 seats, filled by five permanent members and six non-permanent members before 1967. Each year, half of the non-permanent members were elected for two-year terms. A sitting member may not immediately run for re-election.

== Result ==
At this time, the United Nations had 81 member states (for a timeline of UN membership, see Enlargement of the United Nations). There were five candidacies for three seats. At the meeting on 12 October 1959, the President of the United Nations General Assembly proposed granting seats to Ecuador, and Ceylon, a motion that was approved by the assembly. Further discussion of the candidacies of Turkey and Poland was moved to another day.

=== Day 1 ===
The first thirteen rounds of balloting were held on 12 October 1959 at the 825th plenary meeting of the General Assembly. Ecuador, and Ceylon were elected in the first round, leaving only the WOEG seat vacant. As Poland and Turkey were the states with the highest number of votes contesting the Asian seat, in accordance with the rules, consecutive rounds of restricted voting would commence. In these rounds, only the two states that have attained the highest number of votes in the previous round (Poland and Turkey) could be voted on, any other votes would be considered invalid. After the thirteen rounds of voting failed to provide an election outcome, the meeting rose.

Member	Round 1	Round 2	Round 3	Round 4	Round 5	Round 6	Round 7	Round 8	Round 9	Round 10	Round 11	Round 12	Round 13
Ecuador	77	–	–	–	–	–	–	–	–	–	–	–	–
Ceylon	72	–	–	–	–	–	–	–	–	–	–	–	–
Poland	46	43	45	46	46	46	48	47	48	47	45	46	46
Turkey	36	38	36	35	34	34	33	34	33	34	35	36	34
Burma	1	–	–	–	–	–	–	–	–	–	–	–	–
Canada	1	–	–	–	–	–	–	–	–	–	–	–	–
abstentions	0	0	0	0	0	0	0	0	0	0	0	0	0
invalid ballots	0	0	0	0	0	0	0	0	0	0	0	0	0
required majority	54	54	54	54	54	54	54	54	54	54	54	54	54
ballot papers	81	81	81	81	81	81	81	81	81	81	81	81	81

=== Day 2 ===
The next twelve rounds of balloting were held on 13 October 1959 at the 826th plenary meeting of the General Assembly.

=== Day 3 ===
The next six rounds of balloting were held on 19 October 1959 at the 827th plenary meeting of the General Assembly.

=== Day 4 ===
The next six rounds of balloting were held on 3 November 1959 at the 830th plenary meeting of the General Assembly.

=== Day 5 ===
The next six rounds of balloting were held on 17 November 1959 at the 835th plenary meeting of the General Assembly.

=== Day 6 ===
The next six rounds of balloting were held on 1 December 1959 at the 839th plenary meeting of the General Assembly.

=== Day 7 ===
The final round of balloting was held on 12 December 1959 at the 845th plenary meeting of the General Assembly. During this round, the General Assembly was able to endorse an agreement. The president stated that "Poland will at this time be the only candidate for election as non-permanent member of the Security Council and, if elected, will serve in that capacity during the year 1960. As an integral part of the agreement reached, Poland will withdraw from the Council on 31 December 1960. This would mean that... Turkey would be the only candidate to fill the vacancy thus created on the Council and to serve as non-permanent member during the year 1961." Therefore, Poland received 71 votes.

== See also ==
- List of members of the United Nations Security Council
- Turkey and the United Nations
- Turkey in the UN Security Council
- Poland and the United Nations
- Ecuador and the United Nations
