= 2000 United Nations Security Council election =

Election to the United Nations Security Council

- 10 October 2000

5 of 10 non-permanent seats on the United Nations Security Council
- United Nations Security Council membership after the election Permanent members Non-permanent members
- Outgoing members Namibia (Africa) Malaysia (Asia) Argentina (GRULAC) Canada (WEOG) Netherlands (WEOG) Elected members Mauritius (Africa) Singapore (Asia) Colombia (GRULAC) Ireland (WEOG) Norway (WEOG)

- Unsuccessful candidates
- Italy (WEOG)
- Sudan (Africa)

The 2000 United Nations Security Council election was held on 10 October 2000 at United Nations Headquarters in New York City during the 55th session of the United Nations General Assembly. The General Assembly elected five non-permanent members of the UN Security Council for two-year terms commencing on 1 January 2001.

The five candidates elected were Colombia, Ireland, Mauritius, Norway, and Singapore (for the first time).

== Geographic distribution ==
In accordance with the General Assembly's rules for the geographic distribution of the non-permanent members of the Security Council, and established practice, the members were to be elected as follows: one from Africa, one from Asia, one from Latin American and the Caribbean (GRULAC), and two from Western Europe and Other States.

== Candidates ==
There was a total of seven candidates for the five seats. Colombia and Singapore would run unopposed for the one seat each reserved for GRULAC and the Asian Group, respectively. Singapore was also the endorsed candidate for the Asian Group. For the African Group, Sudan and Mauritius competed for the one seat reserved, Sudan being the group's endorsed candidate. For the two Western European seats, there were three candidates: Ireland, Italy, and Norway.

== Results ==
Voting proceeded by secret ballot. For each geographic group, each member state could vote for as many candidates as were to be elected. There were 173 ballots in each of the three elections. Candidates were required to gather a 2/3 support of all nations voting; that is, the exact number for the 2/3 is determined without the abstentions and invalid ballots.

=== African and Asian States (two to be elected) ===
1st round

- Singapore 168
- Mauritius 95
- Sudan 69
- abstentions 1

This round brought the election of Singapore, but was inconclusive in regards of the African seat, as neither Mauritius nor Sudan succeeded in securing the 2/3 support of the General Assembly, 115 votes in this round.

2nd round

- Mauritius 102
- Sudan 65
- abstentions 6

This round of voting was inconclusive, though Mauritius did improve its lead on Sudan; neither state could acquire the requisite 112 votes.

3rd round

- Mauritius 110
- Sudan 58
- abstentions 4
- invalid 1

This round saw Mauritius nearly achieve the required 2/3 majority of 112 votes, but was ultimately inconclusive.

4th round

- Mauritius 113
- Sudan 55
- abstentions 5

This round brought the final victory of Mauritius, winning 113 votes, thus securing the 2/3 majority of 112 votes.

=== Latin American and Caribbean States (one to be elected) ===
- Colombia 168
- abstentions 5

=== Western European and Other States (two to be elected) ===
1st round

- Ireland 130
- Norway 114
- Italy 94

In this round, Ireland was elected to the Security Council, and the second seat of the Western European and Others Group was yet to be decided upon, as neither Italy nor Norway had succeeded to secure a 2/3 majority, or 116 votes.

2nd round

- Norway 100
- Italy 70
- abstentions 2
- invalid 1

This round of voting was inconclusive, as neither nation could secure the requisite 114 votes.

3rd round

- Norway 110
- Italy 62
- abstentions 1

This round saw Norway increase its lead on Italy, but ultimately failing to secure the requisite 115 votes needed for election.

4th round

- Norway 115
- Italy 57
- abstentions 1

This round saw Norway collecting the exact number of votes that was required for election: 115.

=== End result ===
The first round of voting saw the election of Colombia, Ireland, and Singapore. After two inconclusive rounds, the two remaining seats were finally in the fourth round given to Mauritius and Norway, who overcame Italy and Sudan in the respective votes.

== See also ==
- List of members of the United Nations Security Council
- European Union and the United Nations
