= Western European and Others Group =

United Nations regional group

Group of Western European and Other States
- Abbreviation: WEOG
- Formation: December 1957; 68 years ago
- Type: Regional group
- Legal status: Active

WEOG member and observer states

The Group of Western European and Other States, also known as the Western European and Other States Group or WEOG, is one of the five United Nations regional groups. It is composed of 28 member states. Most of these are in Western Europe, but the group also includes countries of North America, the Eastern Mediterranean, Fennoscandia and Oceania. The United States and Holy See (Vatican City) participate as observers.

The Group is a non-binding dialogue group where subjects concerning regional and international matters are discussed. Additionally, the Group works to help allocate seats on United Nations bodies by nominating candidates from the region.

Unlike most other Regional Groups, WEOG is unusual in that geography is not the sole defining factor of its membership. Instead, its membership is based on geopolitical breakdown, based on the cultural concept of the "Western world" of affluent, developed liberal democracies, and are either part of Western Europe or a majority European-descended state (except Israel), and part of the NATO military alliance and/or the US-led western military-economic community.

As of 2024, the Western European and Others Group provided 56% of the United Nations budget.

== Membership ==
=== Member states ===
The following are the current Member States of the Western European and Others Group:

- Andorra
- Australia
- Austria
- Belgium
- Canada
- Denmark
- Finland
- France (Note: Permanent member of the United Nations Security Council)
- Germany (Note: Represented by West Germany until 1990. East Germany was part of the Eastern European Group 1973–1990.)
- Greece
- Iceland
- Ireland
- Israel (Note: While geographically located in Asia, Israel has participated in WEOG since 2000)
- Italy
- Liechtenstein
- Luxembourg
- Malta
- Monaco
- Netherlands
- New Zealand
- Norway
- Portugal
- San Marino
- Spain
- Sweden
- Switzerland
- Turkey (Note: Turkey is a member of both WEOG and the Asian Group, but for voting purposes is only part of WEOG.)
- United Kingdom

=== Observer states ===
- United States of America
  - The United States of America is not formally a member of any regional group, but attends meetings of WEOG as an observer and is considered to be a member of the group for electoral purposes.
- Holy See (Vatican City)

=== Israel ===
While geographically located in Asia, Israel has been blocked from joining the Asia-Pacific Group by various Arab states. Due to having no regional group, Israel was unable to participate in the political and professional consultations within the framework of the United Nations and its agencies between its admission in 1949 and 1999. It was also unable to have its representatives elected to United Nations institutions due to the fact that it was not part of any regional group. In 1964, Israel applied to join WEOG and was rejected.

This changed in May 2000, when Israel became a temporary member of the WEOG at the United Nations in New York, allowing it to put forward candidates for election to various United Nations General Assembly bodies. However, this temporary membership still precluded Israel from participating in activities at United Nations offices in Geneva, Nairobi, Rome and Vienna.

On 30 April 2004, the United States House of Representatives passed a resolution calling for the full inclusion of Israel in WEOG, directing the U.S. Government to pursue action to "ensure the extension and upgrade of Israel's membership in the Western European and Others Group at the United Nations." This was accomplished in May 2004, when Israel was granted a permanent renewal for WEOG proceedings in New York.

However, it was not until November 2013 when Israel was finally admitted into WEOG proceedings at the United Nations Geneva Office, 1 January 2014.

== Suggested reform ==
In his address before the General Assembly at the 55th General Debate, Vinci Niel Clodumar, the head of the Nauru Delegation, advocated for the creation of a new Oceania regional group to include both Australia and New Zealand, as well as the ASEAN member countries, Japan, the Republic of Korea and the Pacific island countries. In his speech he mentioned that "the 11 Pacific island countries are drowning in the Asian Group, while Australia and New Zealand...are marooned in the Group of Western European and other States."

== Representation ==
=== Security Council ===
The Western European and Other States Group holds 5 seats on the Security Council, 2 non-permanent and 3 permanent. The current members of the Security Council from the Group are:

Country	Term
France	Permanent
United Kingdom of Great Britain and Northern Ireland	Permanent
United States of America	Permanent
Denmark	1 January 2025 – 31 December 2026
Greece	1 January 2025 – 31 December 2026

=== Economic and Social Council ===
The Western European and Other States Group holds 13 seats on the United Nations Economic and Social Council. The current members of the Economic and Social Council from the Group are:

Country	Term
Sweden	1 January 2023 – 31 December 2025
France	1 January 2024 – 31 December 2026
Liechtenstein	1 January 2024 – 31 December 2026
Spain	1 January 2024 – 31 December 2026
Turkey	1 January 2024 – 31 December 2026
United Kingdom	1 January 2024 – 31 December 2026
Australia	1 January 2025 – 31 December 2027
Austria	1 January 2025 – 31 December 2027
Canada	1 January 2025 – 31 December 2027
Finland	1 January 2025 – 31 December 2027
Italy	1 January 2025 – 31 December 2027
Netherlands	1 January 2025 – 31 December 2027
Switzerland	1 January 2025 – 31 December 2027

=== Human Rights Council ===
The Western European and Other States Group holds 7 seats on the United Nations Human Rights Council. The current members of the Human Rights Council from the Group are:

Country	Term
France	1 January 2024 – 31 December 2026
Netherlands	1 January 2024 – 31 December 2026
Iceland	1 January 2025 – 31 December 2027
Spain	1 January 2025 – 31 December 2027
Switzerland	1 January 2025 – 31 December 2027
Belgium	1 January 2023 – 31 December 2025
Germany	1 January 2023 – 31 December 2025

=== Presidency of the General Assembly ===
Every five years in the years ending in 0 and 5, the Western European and Other States Group is eligible to elect a president to the General Assembly.

The following is a list of presidents from the region since its official creation in 1961:

Year Elected	Session	Name of President	Country	Note
1965	20th	Amintore Fanfani	Italy	
1970	25th	Edvard Hambro	Norway	
1975	30th	Gaston Thorn	Luxembourg	
1980	35th	Rüdiger von Wechmar	Federal Republic of Germany	Also chaired the eighth emergency special session of the General Assembly
1985	40th	Jaime de Piniés	Spain	Also chaired the thirteenth special session of the General Assembly
1990	45th	Guido de Marco	Malta	
1995	50th	Diogo de Freitas do Amaral	Portugal	
2000	55th	Harri Holkeri	Finland	Also chaired the tenth emergency special, twenty-fifth special and twenty-sixth special sessions of the General Assembly
2005	60th	Jan Eliasson	Sweden	
2010	65th	Joseph Deiss	Switzerland	
2015	70th	Mogens Lykketoft	Denmark	
2020	75th	Volkan Bozkır	Turkey	
2025	80th	Annalena Baerbock	Germany	
Future
2030	85th	TBD	TBD	
2035	90th	TBD	TBD	

== Timeline of electoral membership ==
Years	Number of members	Notes
1957	13	Austria, Belgium, Denmark, Greece, Iceland, Ireland, Italy, Luxembourg, Netherlands, Norway, Portugal, Spain, Sweden
1958	14	Australia
1959	16	Canada, South Africa
1961	17	Finland
1963	19	Turkey, Israel
1964	19	New Zealand, Malta. South Africa and Israel were excluded.
1965	22	France, United Kingdom, United States
1973	23	West Germany
1990	24	Liechtenstein, German reunification
1992	25	San Marino
1993	27	Monaco, Andorra
2000	28	Israel
2002	29	Switzerland

The Western European and Others Group was originally created in 1957 against its wishes, after Latin America, Asia and Africa, (Note: Asia and Africa did not split into two different groups until 1958 de facto, and until 1963 de jure.) and Eastern Europe made their own groups. States like Australia wanted to keep the previous Commonwealth group, while states like France did not want to caucus with the Commonwealth states. At first, Canada considered applying for the Latin American group and renaming it a "Western Hemisphere" group, while Australia and New Zealand considered applying for the Asian group.

Between 1957 and 1963, Canada, Australia, New Zealand, and South Africa negotiated with the Western European states for WEOG seats on the United Nations General Committee. Canada, Australia, and New Zealand did not consider themselves to be WEOG members during this time, although the General Assembly did. Australia obtained a seat in 1958 and 1962, Canada ran for a seat in 1959 and obtained a seat in 1960, and South Africa obtained a seat in 1959. In 1963, Israel unsuccessfully ran for a seat and was counted by the General Assembly as running for a WEOG seat. In 1964, the Western European states formally invited Canada, Australia, and New Zealand into their caucus, while refusing to invite Israel and South Africa.

Under pressure from the Soviet Union, Finland was initially in the Eastern European Group until 1960. Finland switched to WEOG in 1961.

Turkey was a member of the Asian group electorally until at least 1961, switching to WEOG by 1963. The General Assembly does not have a record of which group Turkey was a member of electorally in 1962.

The wording of the 1957 General Assembly resolution placed the permanent members of the Security Council in their own group, causing France, the United Kingdom, and the United States to not count as part of WEOG electorally. When ECOSOC was expanded, the wording of the 1963 General Assembly resolution only assigned groups to the nine new seats, leaving the aforementioned permanent three still outside of WEOG electorally. The permanent three were formally placed into WEOG electorally in November 1965, when the United Nations Development Programme was created and groups were assigned to all its executive board seats.

The above table excludes states who attended WEOG meetings prior to having electoral weight. West Germany, Monaco, Switzerland, and the Holy See became WEOG observers in 1967, while the first record from the US Department of State of the United States attending a WEOG meeting is from 1970.

In approximately the first half of the 1960s, Yugoslavia participated in both WEOG and the Eastern European Group (similar to Turkey participating in two groups), but was only ever counted in the Eastern European Group electorally. Also during this time, Cyprus participated in both WEOG and the Asian group, but was only ever counted in the Asian group electorally. Both eventually left WEOG around the mid-1960s.

== Caucusing subgroups ==
The Western European and Others Group in part contains three caucusing subgroups (Benelux, the Nordic countries, and CANZ (Note: Canada, Australia, and New Zealand)), whose members informally coordinate with each other for seats on the UN Security Council and UN Economic and Social Council. Iceland joined the Nordic caucus in 1998.

== See also ==
- United Nations Regional Groups
- Israel and the United Nations
- List of members of the United Nations Security Council
- List of members of the United Nations Economic and Social Council
- JUSCANZ
