= Eastern European Group =

Regional group in the United Nations

- Abbreviation: EEG
- Formation: 1964; 62 years ago
- Type: Regional group
- Legal status: Active
- Region served: Europe

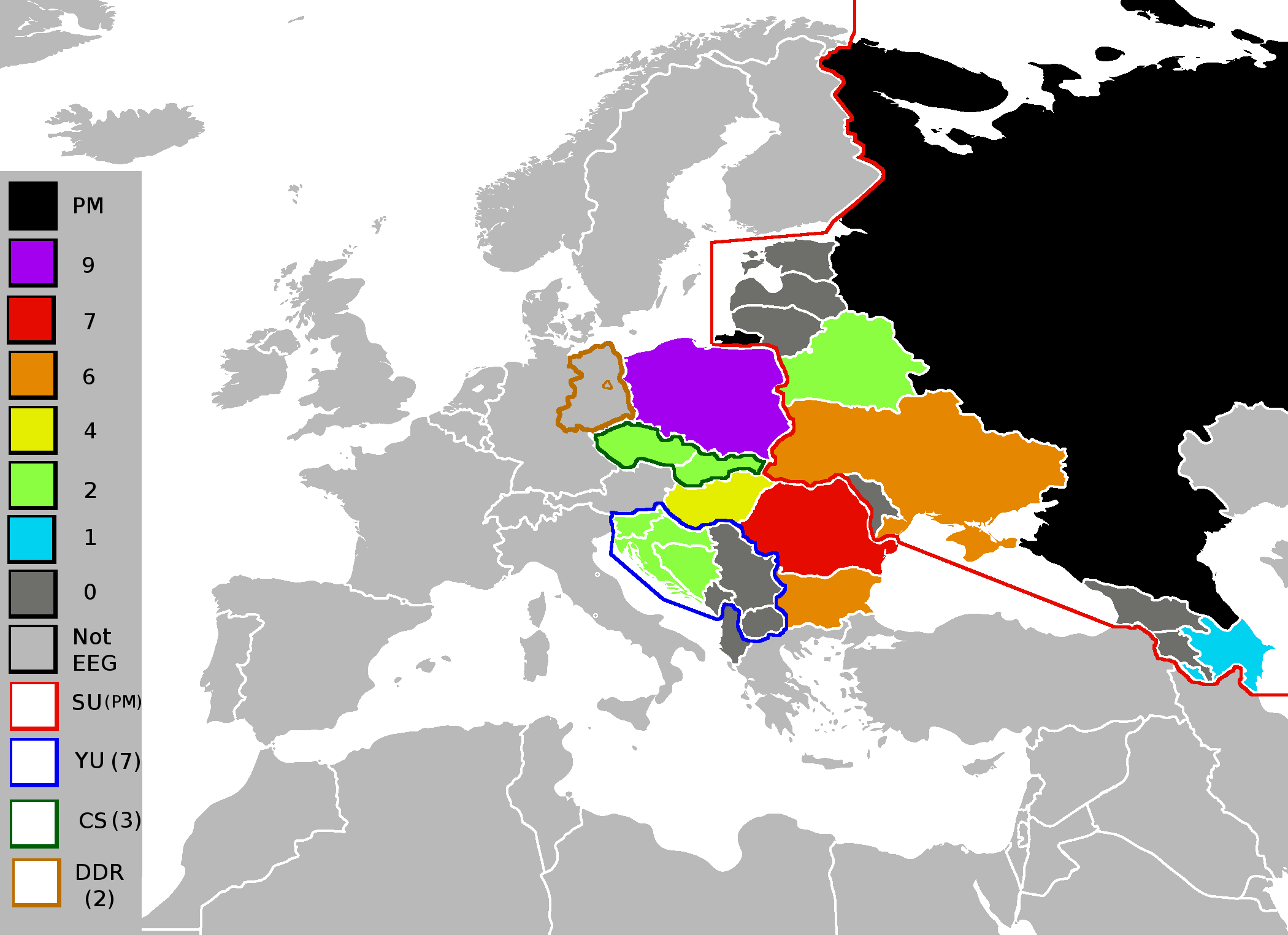
The Eastern European Group in 2012, with the years each member spent in the United Nations Security Council, including former members represented as outlines

The Group of Eastern European States, or EEG, is one of the five United Nations regional groups composed of 23 Member States from Eastern, Central and Southern Europe.

The Group, as with all the regional groups, is a non-binding dialogue group where subjects concerning regional and international matters are discussed. Additionally, the Group works to help allocate seats on United Nations bodies by nominating candidates from the region.

== History ==
Prior to the creation of the Regional Groups in 1964, the United Nations Security Council had an Eastern European and Asian Seat, that was occupied between 1946 and 1964 by countries from Eastern Europe (including Greece and Turkey), as well as by members of the modern Western European and Others and Asia-Pacific Groups.

Since its creation, the Group has changed significantly due to the dissolution of various members: the Soviet Union in 1991, Yugoslavia between 1991-2006 and Czechoslovakia in 1993. Additionally, through the process of German reunification, the Group lost the German Democratic Republic as one of its member states.

== Members ==
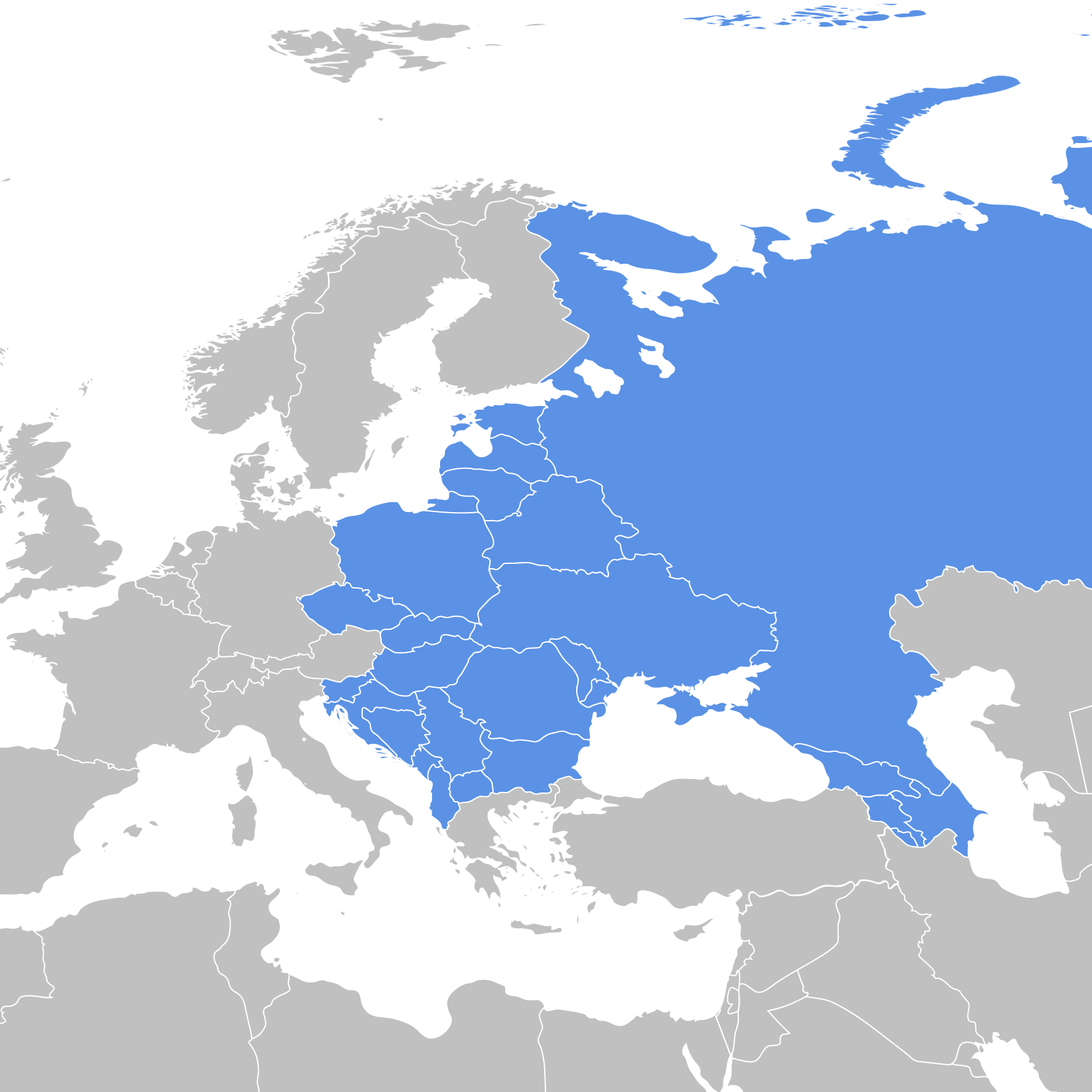
Eastern European Group

=== Current members ===
The following are the current Member States of the Eastern European Group:

- Albania
- Armenia
- Azerbaijan
- Belarus (Note: Formerly represented by the Byelorussian Soviet Socialist Republic until 1991)
- Bosnia and Herzegovina
- Bulgaria
- Croatia
- Czechia (Note: The UN switched from using "Czech Republic" to "Czechia" in 2022.)
- Estonia
- Georgia
- Hungary
- Latvia
- Lithuania
- Moldova
- Montenegro
- North Macedonia (Note: Formerly under name "The former Yugoslav Republic of Macedonia" until 2019)
- Poland
- Romania
- Russia (Note: Formerly represented by the Soviet Union until 1991) (Note: Permanent member of the United Nations Security Council)
- Serbia
- Slovakia
- Slovenia
- Ukraine (Note: Formerly represented by the Ukrainian SSR until 1991)

=== Historical members ===
- Czechoslovakia (1966–1993)
- SFR Yugoslavia (1966–1992)
- East Germany (1973–1990)

== Representation ==
The Eastern European Group has two seats in the United Nations Security Council (UNSC); the permanent seat of Russia, and one elected seat, currently held by Latvia. The Group further has 6 seats on the United Nations Economic and Social Council and 6 seats on the United Nations Human Rights Council. It is also eligible for having its nationals elected as President of the United Nations General Assembly in years ending with 2 and 7; most recently, Csaba Kőrösi of Hungary was elected to this position in 2022 and was the office holder of the Seventy-seventh session.

=== Security Council ===
The Eastern European Group holds two seats on the Security Council, 1 non-permanent and 1 permanent. The current members of the Security Council from the Group are:

| Country | Term |
|---|---|
| Russia | Permanent |
| Latvia | 1 January 2026 – 31 December 2027 |

=== Economic and Social Council ===
The Eastern European Group holds six seats on the United Nations Economic and Social Council. The current members of the Economic and Social Council from the Group are:

| Country | Term |
|---|---|
| Poland | 1 January 2024 – 31 December 2026 |
| Armenia | 1 January 2025 – 31 December 2027 |
| Azerbaijan | 1 January 2025 – 31 December 2027 |
| Croatia | 1 January 2026 – 31 December 2028 |
| Russia | 1 January 2026 – 31 December 2028 |
| Ukraine | 1 January 2026 – 31 December 2028 |

=== Human Rights Council ===
The Eastern European Group holds six seats on the United Nations Human Rights Council. The current members of the Human Rights Council from the Group are:

| Country | Term |
|---|---|
| Albania | 1 January 2024 – 31 December 2026 |
| Bulgaria | 1 January 2024 – 31 December 2026 |
| Czechia | 1 January 2025 – 31 December 2027 |
| North Macedonia | 1 January 2025 – 31 December 2027 |
| Estonia | 1 January 2026 – 31 December 2028 |
| Slovenia | 1 January 2026 – 31 December 2028 |

=== Presidency of the General Assembly ===
Every five years in the years ending in 2 and 7, the Eastern European Group is eligible to elect a president to the General Assembly.

The following is a list of presidents from the region since its official creation in 1963:

| Year Elected | Session | Name of President | Country | Note |
|---|---|---|---|---|
| 1967 | 22nd | Corneliu Mănescu | Romania | |
| 1972 | 27th | Stanisław Trepczyński | Poland | |
| 1977 | 32nd | Lazar Mojsov | Yugoslavia | Also chaired the 8th, 9th and 10th special sessions of the General Assembly |
| 1982 | 37th | Imre Hollai | Hungary | |
| 1987 | 42nd | Peter Florin | German Democratic Republic | Also chaired the 15th special session of the General Assembly |
| 1992 | 47th | Stoyan Ganev | Bulgaria | |
| 1997 | 52nd | Hennadiy Udovenko | Ukraine | Also chaired the 10th emergency special and 20th special sessions of the General Assembly |
| 2002 | 57th | Jan Kavan | Czech Republic | Also chaired the 10th emergency special session of the General Assembly |
| 2007 | 62nd | Srgjan Kerim | FYR Macedonia | |
| 2012 | 67th | Vuk Jeremić | Serbia | |
| 2017 | 72nd | Miroslav Lajčák | Slovakia | Also chaired the 10th emergency special session of the General Assembly |
| 2022 | 77th | Csaba Kőrösi | Hungary | Also chaired the 11th emergency special |
Future
| 2027 | 82nd | TBD | TBD | |
| 2032 | 87th | TBD | TBD | |

== Timeline of membership ==
As the Eastern European Group changed significantly over time, the number of its members had also changed.

| Years | Number of members | Notes |
|---|---|---|
| 1966–1973 | 10 | Poland, Czechoslovakia, Hungary, Yugoslavia, Albania, Bulgaria, Romania, Soviet Union; Ukraine (as Ukrainian SSR) and Belarus (as Byelorussian SSR) were members on their own right (see here) |
| 1973–1990 | 11 | German Democratic Republic being a member |
| 1990 | 10 | German reunification |
| 1991–1992 | 21 | Dissolution of the Soviet Union (Estonia, Latvia, Lithuania, Moldova, Georgia, Armenia, Azerbaijan), breakup of Yugoslavia (Slovenia, Croatia, Bosnia and Herzegovina, Macedonia) |
| 1993 | 22 | Dissolution of Czechoslovakia (Czech Republic, Slovakia) |
| 2006–present | 23 | Dissolution of Serbia and Montenegro (Serbia, Montenegro) |

== See also ==
- Community for Democracy and Rights of Nations
- Community of Democratic Choice
- Council of Europe
- Eastern Europe
- Eastern Partnership
- Eurasian Economic Union
- Euronest Parliamentary Assembly
- European Neighborhood Policy
- Eurovoc
- Future enlargement of the European Union
- List of political parties in Eastern Europe
- Organization for Security and Co-operation in Europe
- Post-Soviet states
