= United Nations geoscheme =

U.N. region definitions

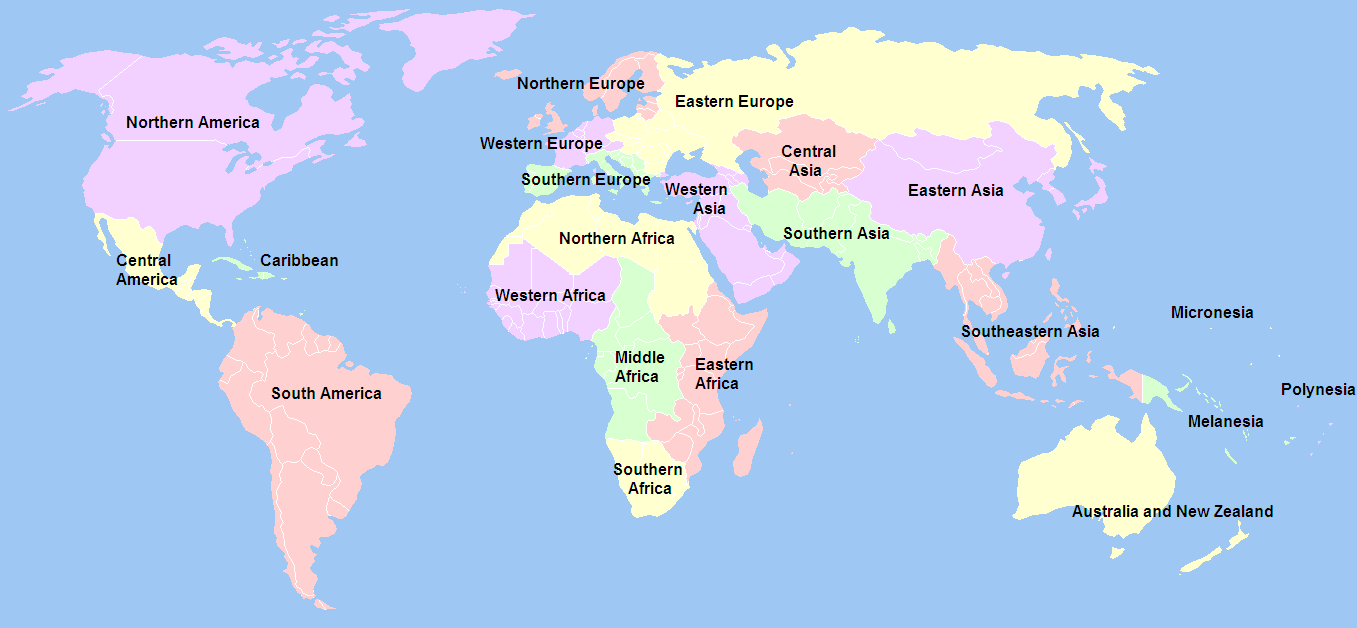
22 geographical subregions as defined by the UNSD. Antarctica (Note: A continental region with no geographical subregions.) is not shown.

The United Nations geoscheme is a system that divides 248 countries and territories in the world into six continental regions, 22 geographical subregions, and two intermediary regions. It was devised by the United Nations Statistics Division (UNSD) based on the M49 coding classification. The creators note that "the assignment of countries or areas to specific groupings is for statistical convenience and does not imply any assumption regarding political or other affiliation of countries or territories".

The UNSD geoscheme was created for statistical analysis and consists of macro-geographical regions arranged to the extent possible according to continents. Within each region, smaller geographical subregions and sometimes intermediary regions contain countries and territories. Countries and territories are also grouped non-geographically into selected economic and other sets, such as the landlocked developing countries, the least developed countries, and the Small Island Developing States.

Antarctica does not comprise any geographical subregions or country-level areas.

The UNSD geoscheme does not set a standard for the entire United Nations System, and it often differs from geographical definitions used by the autonomous United Nations specialized agencies for their own organizational convenience. For instance, the UNSD includes Cyprus and Georgia in Western Asia, yet the United Nations Industrial Development Organization and UNESCO include them in Europe. This statistical definition also differs from United Nations Regional Groups.

Alternative groupings include the World Bank regional classification, CIA World Factbook regions and Internet Corporation for Assigned Names and Numbers regions.

== Maps ==
UN geoscheme for Africa
Eastern Africa
Middle Africa
Northern Africa
Southern Africa
Western Africa

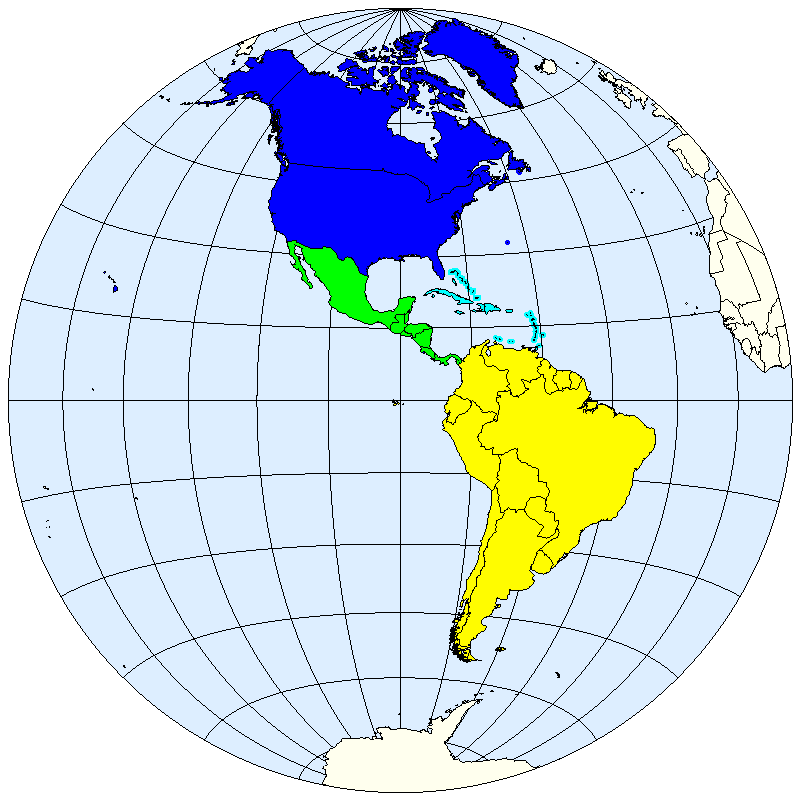
UN geoscheme for the Americas
Caribbean
Central America
Northern America
South America

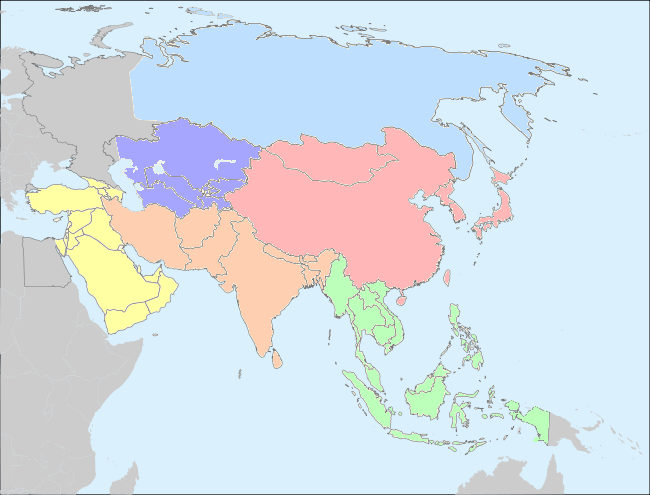
UN geoscheme for Asia
Central Asia
Eastern Asia
South-eastern Asia
Southern Asia
Western Asia

UN geoscheme for Europe
Eastern Europe
Northern Europe
Southern Europe
Western Europe

== Africa ==
=== Northern Africa ===
- Algeria
- Egypt
- Libya
- Morocco
- Sudan
- Tunisia
- Western Sahara

=== Sub-Saharan Africa ===
==== Eastern Africa ====
- British Indian Ocean Territory (Note: An Overseas Territory of the United Kingdom.)
- Burundi
- Comoros
- Djibouti
- Eritrea
- Ethiopia
- French Southern Territories
- Kenya
- Madagascar
- Malawi
- Mauritius
- Mayotte (Note: An overseas department and region of France.)
- Mozambique
- Réunion
- Rwanda
- Seychelles
- Somalia
- South Sudan
- Uganda
- United Republic of Tanzania
- Zambia
- Zimbabwe

==== Middle Africa ====
- Angola
- Cameroon
- Central African Republic
- Chad
- Congo
- Democratic Republic of the Congo
- Equatorial Guinea
- Gabon
- Sao Tome and Principe

==== Southern Africa ====
- Botswana
- Eswatini
- Lesotho
- Namibia
- South Africa

==== Western Africa ====
- Benin
- Burkina Faso
- Cabo Verde
- Côte d'Ivoire
- Gambia
- Ghana
- Guinea
- Guinea-Bissau
- Liberia
- Mali
- Mauritania
- Niger
- Nigeria
- Saint Helena, Ascension and Tristan da Cunha
  - Saint Helena
  - Ascension Island
  - Tristan da Cunha
- Senegal
- Sierra Leone
- Togo

== Americas ==
=== Latin America and the Caribbean ===
==== Caribbean ====
- Anguilla
- Antigua and Barbuda
- Aruba (Note: Part of the Dutch Caribbean and a constituent country within the Kingdom of the Netherlands)
- Bahamas
- Barbados
- Bonaire, Sint Eustatius and Saba (Note: A part of the Dutch Caribbean and a public body within the Kingdom of the Netherlands.)
  - Bonaire
  - Sint Eustatius
  - Saba
- British Virgin Islands
- Cayman Islands
- Cuba
- Curaçao
- Dominica
- Dominican Republic
- Grenada
- Guadeloupe
- Haiti
- Jamaica
- Martinique
- Montserrat
- Puerto Rico (Note: A commonwealth and unincorporated territory of the United States.)
- Saint Barthélemy (Note: An overseas collectivity of France.)
- Saint Kitts and Nevis
- Saint Lucia
- Saint Martin (French part)
- Saint Vincent and the Grenadines
- Sint Maarten (Dutch part)
- Trinidad and Tobago
- Turks and Caicos Islands
- U.S. Virgin Islands (Note: An unincorporated and organized territory of the United States)

==== Central America ====
- Belize
- Costa Rica
- El Salvador
- Guatemala
- Honduras
- Mexico
- Nicaragua
- Panama

==== South America ====
- Argentina
- Bolivia (Plurinational State of)
- Bouvet Island (Note: A dependency of Norway)
- Brazil
- Chile
- Colombia
- Ecuador
- Falkland Islands (Malvinas)
- French Guiana
- Guyana
- Paraguay
- Peru
- South Georgia and the South Sandwich Islands
- Suriname
- Uruguay
- Venezuela (Bolivarian Republic of)

=== Northern America ===
- Bermuda
- Canada
- Greenland (Note: A constituent country within the Kingdom of Denmark)
- Saint Pierre and Miquelon
- United States of America

== Asia ==
=== Central Asia ===
- Kazakhstan
- Kyrgyzstan
- Tajikistan
- Turkmenistan
- Uzbekistan

=== Eastern Asia ===
- China
- Hong Kong
- Macao
- Korea, Democratic People's Republic of (North Korea)
- Japan
- Mongolia
- Korea, Republic of (South Korea)

==== Note on Taiwan ====
Several institutions and research papers using classification schemes based on the UN geoscheme include Taiwan separately in their divisions of Eastern Asia.

1. The Unicode CLDR's "Territory Containment (UN M.49)" includes Taiwan in its presentation of the UN M.49.
2. The public domain map data set Natural Earth has metadata in the fields named "region_un" and "subregion" for Taiwan.
3. The regional split recommended by Lloyd's of London for Eastern Asia (UN statistical divisions of Eastern Asia) contains Taiwan.
4. Based on the United Nations statistical divisions, the APRICOT (conference) includes Taiwan in East Asia.
5. Studying Website Usability in Asia, Ather Nawaz and Torkil Clemmensen select Asian countries on the basis of United Nations statistical divisions, and Taiwan is also included.
6. Taiwan is also included in the UN Geoscheme of Eastern Asia in one systematic review on attention deficit hyperactivity disorder.

=== Note on Northern Asia ===
This unofficial subregion covers the entire geographical region of Siberia. Since this region as a whole falls under the transcontinental country of Russia, for statistical convenience, Russia is assigned under Eastern Europe by the UNSD, including both European Russia and Asian Russia under a single subregion. Hence, there is no geopolitical entity that is currently grouped under Northern Asia.

=== South-eastern Asia ===
This subregion covers the geographical regions of Mainland Southeast Asia and Maritime Southeast Asia, covering the following geopolitical entities as a whole:

- Brunei Darussalam
- Cambodia
- Indonesia
- Lao People's Democratic Republic
- Malaysia
- Myanmar
- Philippines
- Singapore
- Thailand
- Timor-Leste
- Viet Nam

=== Southern Asia ===
This subregion covers the geographical regions of the Indian subcontinent and the Iranian plateau, covering the following geopolitical entities as a whole:

- Afghanistan
- Bangladesh
- Bhutan
- India
- Iran (Islamic Republic of)
- Maldives
- Nepal
- Pakistan
- Sri Lanka

=== Western Asia ===
This subregion covers the geographical regions spanning over the Armenian Highlands, Anatolia, Arabia, the Levant, Mesopotamia, and the South Caucasus, covering the following geopolitical entities as a whole:

- Armenia
- Azerbaijan
- Bahrain
- Cyprus
- Georgia
- Iraq
- Israel
- Jordan
- Kuwait
- Lebanon
- Oman
- Qatar
- Saudi Arabia
- State of Palestine
- Syrian Arab Republic
- Türkiye
- United Arab Emirates
- Yemen

== Europe ==
=== Eastern Europe ===
- Belarus
- Bulgaria
- Czechia
- Hungary
- Poland
- Republic of Moldova
- Romania
- Russian Federation^{†}
- Slovakia
- Ukraine

^{†} Although Russia is a transcontinental country covering Northern Asia as well, for statistical convenience, Russia is assigned under Eastern Europe by the UNSD, including both European Russia and Asian Russia under a single subregion.

=== Northern Europe ===
- Åland Islands
- Denmark
- Estonia
- Faroe Islands
- Finland
- Guernsey
- Iceland
- Ireland
- Isle of Man
- Jersey
- Latvia
- Lithuania
- Norway
- Svalbard and Jan Mayen
- Sweden
- United Kingdom of Great Britain and Northern Ireland

=== Southern Europe ===
- Albania
- Andorra
- Bosnia and Herzegovina
- Croatia
- Gibraltar
- Greece
- Holy See
- Italy
- Malta
- Montenegro
- North Macedonia
- Portugal
- San Marino
- Serbia
- Slovenia
- Spain

=== Western Europe ===
- Austria
- Belgium
- France
- Germany
- Liechtenstein
- Luxembourg
- Monaco
- Netherlands (Kingdom of the)
- Switzerland

== Oceania ==
=== Australia and New Zealand ===
- Australia
- Christmas Island
- Cocos (Keeling) Islands
- Heard Island and McDonald Islands
- New Zealand
- Norfolk Island

=== Melanesia ===
- Fiji
- New Caledonia
- Papua New Guinea
- Solomon Islands
- Vanuatu

=== Micronesia ===
- Guam
- Kiribati
- Marshall Islands
- Micronesia (Federated States of)
- Naoero
- Northern Mariana Islands
- Palau
- United States Minor Outlying Islands (United States)
  - Baker Island
  - Howland Island
  - Jarvis Island
  - Johnston Atoll
  - Kingman Reef
  - Midway Atoll
  - Palmyra Atoll
  - Wake Island

=== Polynesia ===
- American Samoa
- Cook Islands
- French Polynesia
- Niue
- Pitcairn
- Samoa
- Tokelau
- Tonga
- Tuvalu
- Wallis and Futuna

== See also ==
- List of countries and territories by the United Nations geoscheme
- List of continents and continental subregions by population
- List of regions of Africa
- Regions of the African Union
- Regions of Europe
- List of regions of Latin America
