= United Nations Regional Groups =

Geopolitical regional groups within the UN

The United Nations Regional Groups are the geopolitical regional groups of member states of the United Nations. Originally, the UN member states were unofficially organized into five groups as an informal means of sharing the distribution of posts for General Assembly committees. Now this grouping has taken on a much more expansive and official role. Many UN bodies are allocated on the basis of geographical representation. Top leadership positions, including Secretary-General and President of the General Assembly, are rotated among the regional groups. The groups also coordinate substantive policy and form common fronts for negotiations and bloc voting.

African Group – 54 states Asia and the Pacific Group – 54 states Eastern European Group (EEG) – 23 states Latin American and Caribbean Group (GRULAC) – 33 states Western European and Others Group (WEOG) – 29 states UN General Assembly observer states – Holy See (Note: The sovereign entity with statehood over the territory of the Vatican City State.) and Palestine (Note: Currently under Israeli occupation.) Western Sahara (disputed) Antarctica (Note: Assertion of territorial claims suspended under the Antarctic Treaty System.)

== History ==
=== League of Nations ===
The precedent of the geographic distribution of seats was set by the United Nations' predecessor, the League of Nations. Under the League's system, a Nominations Committee was created in order to create election slates for distribution of seats in the Council of the League.

This proved a difficult task as the number of seats on the Council was constantly changing. However, from 1926 to 1933 an unofficial pattern of distribution emerged where the non-permanent seats on the Council were distributed along the following lines:

- 3 for Latin American states
- 1 for a Scandinavian state
- 1 for a Little Entente state (Czechoslovakia, Romania or Yugoslavia)
- 1 for a member of the British Commonwealth
- 1 for a Far Eastern state
- 1 seat each for Spain and Poland

=== United Nations ===
During the drafting of the United Nations Charter, the idea of geographic distribution of seats of the new organisation's bodies was one of the priorities of the drafters. On the United States' recommendation, the very first General Committee of the United Nations was composed of:

- The five permanent members of the Security Council
- 3 Latin American states
- 2 British Commonwealth states
- 2 Eastern European states
- 1 Western European state
- 1 Middle Eastern state

This distribution began the precedent of using regional groups for the allocation of seats in United Nations bodies. For example, the first election to the Security Council used a similar scheme, allocating seats along the following lines:

- The five permanent members of the Security Council
- 2 Latin American states
- 1 British Commonwealth state
- 1 Eastern European state
- 1 Western European states
- 1 Middle Eastern state

Elections to the Economic and Social Council also followed along similar lines, but instead allocated seats to "Near East states" and not "Middle Eastern states."

However, these arrangements were not formal and were based on "gentlemen's agreements" agreed upon by the United States and the Soviet Union regarding the distribution of seats in United Nations bodies.

=== Reform ===
Following a wave of decolonization, there were multiple admissions into the United Nations from African, Asian and Pacific states. After the Bandung Conference in 1955, there was increasing solidarity among post-colonial states which led to pressure being put on the United Nations for increased representation of these states. This pressure led to the passage of Resolution 1192 (XII) of 12 December 1957, which established a formal pattern for distribution of seats on the General Committee.

This was followed on 17 December 1963 by Resolutions 1990 (XVIII) and 1991 (XVIII). These resolutions further outlined the distribution of seats on the General Committee, but also outlined how seats would be geographically distributed on the Economic and Social and Security Councils. The resolutions outlined the regions as follow:

- African and Asian states
- Latin American states
- Eastern European states
- Western Europe and Other states

On 20 December 1971 Resolution 2847 (XXVI) formally set up the present distribution system that is in place for the Economic and Social Council. It also split the African and Asian states region into two separate regions, one for Asia and one for Africa.

Finally, on 19 December 1978 Resolution 33/138 was passed by the General Assembly. This resolution called for equitable geographic distribution of the presidency and vice-presidencies of the General Assembly, as well as of the chairmanship of the seven main committees.

=== Present ===
The most recent change to the regional grouping system was in 2011, when the Asia Group was renamed the Group of Asia and the Pacific Small Island Developing States, also Asia and the Pacific Group or Asia-Pacific Group, in order to recognise the growing role Pacific island nations play in the United Nations System.

== Overview ==
Apart from allowing member states with related international interests to liaise, discuss and coordinate their voting and other activities at the United Nations, the main function of the regional groups is to distribute membership quotas in United Nations bodies and leadership positions. According to convention, the non-permanent membership seats of the United Nations Security Council is apportioned between regional groups according to a set formula. Other bodies, such as the United Nations Economic and Social Council and the United Nations Human Rights Council, also have set membership quotas for each regional group. The position of the President of the United Nations General Assembly rotates amongst the groups on a ten-year cycle (the current rule being that each regional group fills the position twice during the cycle, in effect it rotates on a five-year cycle).

Regional Group	Number of members	Population approx. rounded 2026 UN estimates	UNSC permanent members	UNSC elected members	ECOSOC members	HRC members	UNGA President (unit digit of year)
Africa	54 (28%)	1580 million (19%)	0	3	14 (26%)	13 (28%)	4 and 9
Asia and the Pacific (Note: Excluding Turkey)	54 (28%)	4760 million (57%)	1	2	11 (20%)	13 (28%)	1 and 6
EEG	23 (12%)	330 million (4%)	1	1	6 (11%)	6 (13%)	2 and 7
GRULAC	33 (17%)	670 million (8%)	0	2	10 (19%)	8 (17%)	3 and 8
WEOG	28+1 (15%)	960 million (12%)	3	2	13 (24%)	7 (15%)	0 and 5
Total of UN	193	8300 million	5	10	54	47	

=== Seating allocations ===
Security Council	General Assembly	Economic and Social Council	Human Rights Council
African Group Asia and the Pacific Group Eastern European Group (EEG) Latin American and Caribbean Group (GRULAC) Western European and Others Group (WEOG)

== The regional groups ==
Permanent members of the United Nations Security Council are in bold.

=== African Group ===
The African Group consists of 54 member states (28% of all UN members), and is thus the largest regional group by number of member states. It is the only regional group that has a territory that coincides with the traditional continent of which its name originates. Its territory is composed entirely of land from Africa.

The African Group has three seats on the Security Council, all non-permanent. The group also has 14 seats on the Economic and Social Council and 13 seats on the Human Rights Council. In the rotation for the election of the President of the United Nations General Assembly, the group is responsible for electing nationals from its member states in years ending with 4 and 9; most recently, Tijjani Muhammad-Bande of Nigeria was elected to this position in 2019.

In 1964, South Africa was rejected by both the African Group and WEOG. South Africa joined the African Group after the end of apartheid.

Member states of the African Group are as follows:

- Algeria
- Angola
- Benin
- Botswana
- Burkina Faso
- Burundi
- Cape Verde
- Cameroon
- Central African Republic
- Chad
- Comoros
- Democratic Republic of the Congo
- Djibouti
- Egypt
- Equatorial Guinea
- Eritrea
- Eswatini
- Ethiopia
- Gabon
- The Gambia
- Ghana
- Guinea
- Guinea-Bissau
- Ivory Coast
- Kenya
- Lesotho
- Liberia
- Libya
- Madagascar
- Malawi
- Mali
- Mauritania
- Mauritius
- Morocco
- Mozambique
- Namibia
- Niger
- Nigeria
- Republic of the Congo
- Rwanda
- São Tomé and Príncipe
- Senegal
- Seychelles
- Sierra Leone
- Somalia
- South Africa
- South Sudan
- Sudan
- Tanzania
- Togo
- Tunisia
- Uganda
- Zambia
- Zimbabwe

=== Asia and the Pacific Group ===
The Group of Asia and the Pacific Small Island Developing States (formerly the Asia Group), or Asia and the Pacific Group, consists of 55 member states (28.5% of all UN members) and is the second largest regional group by number of member states after the African Group. Its territory is composed of much of the continents of Asia and Oceania with the exception of a few countries. By 2024, Kiribati became the latest state to join the Asia and the Pacific Group after over 20 years of non-membership in any regional group, since it joined the UN in 1999.

Armenia, Azerbaijan, Georgia, and Russia are members of the Eastern European Group, while Australia, New Zealand, and Israel are members of the Western European and Others Group. Cyprus is the only European Union member state which is a member of the Asia and the Pacific Group. Although Turkey participates in meetings of the Asia and the Pacific Group, it is considered part of the Western European and Others Group for the purpose of elections.

The Asia and the Pacific Group has three seats on the Security Council: China's permanent seat and two non-permanent seats. The group also has 11 seats on the Economic and Social Council and 13 seats on the Human Rights Council. In the rotation for the election of the President of the United Nations General Assembly, the group is responsible for electing nationals from its member states in years ending with 1 and 6; most recently, Abdulla Shahid of Maldives was elected to this position in 2021.

Member states of the Asia and the Pacific Group are as follows:

- Afghanistan
- Bahrain
- Bangladesh
- Bhutan
- Brunei
- Cambodia
- **China**
- Cyprus
- Federated States of Micronesia
- Fiji
- India
- Indonesia
- Iran
- Iraq
- Japan
- Jordan
- Kazakhstan
- Kiribati
- Kuwait
- Kyrgyzstan
- Laos
- Lebanon
- Malaysia
- Maldives
- Marshall Islands
- Mongolia
- Myanmar
- Nauru
- Nepal
- North Korea
- Oman
- Pakistan
- Palau
- Papua New Guinea
- Philippines
- Qatar
- Samoa
- Saudi Arabia
- Singapore
- Solomon Islands
- South Korea
- Sri Lanka
- Syria
- Tajikistan
- Thailand
- Timor-Leste
- Tonga
- Turkey (Note: Turkey participates fully in both the Group of Western European and other States and the Group of Asia-Pacific States, but for electoral purposes is considered a member of the Group of Western European and other States only.)
- Turkmenistan
- Tuvalu
- United Arab Emirates
- Uzbekistan
- Vanuatu
- Vietnam
- Yemen

=== Eastern European Group ===
The Eastern European Group consists of 23 member states (12% of all UN members), and as such is the regional group with the fewest member states. Its territory is composed of land from Eastern Europe, as well as parts of Central Europe and Southeast Europe.

The Eastern European Group has two seats on the Security Council: Russia's permanent seat and one non-permanent seat. The group also has 6 seats on the Economic and Social Council and 6 seats on the Human Rights Council. In the rotation for the election of the President of the United Nations General Assembly, the group is responsible for electing nationals from its member states in years ending with 2 and 7; most recently, Csaba Kőrösi of Hungary was elected to this position in 2022.

Member states of the Eastern European Group are as follows:

- Albania
- Armenia
- Azerbaijan
- Belarus
- Bosnia and Herzegovina
- Bulgaria
- Croatia
- Czech Republic
- Estonia
- Georgia
- Hungary
- Latvia
- Lithuania
- Moldova
- Montenegro
- North Macedonia
- Poland
- Romania
- **Russia**
- Serbia
- Slovakia
- Slovenia
- Ukraine

=== Latin American and Caribbean Group (GRULAC) ===
The Latin American and Caribbean Group, or GRULAC, consists of 33 member states (17% of all UN members). Its territory is composed of entirely of land from South and Central America, as well as some islands in the Caribbean and Mexico in North America. Any differences arise from the presence of dependent territories of European countries.

The Latin American and Caribbean Group has two seats on the Security Council, both non-permanent. The group also has 10 seats on the Economic and Social Council and 8 seats on the Human Rights Council. In the rotation for the election of the President of the United Nations General Assembly, the group is responsible for electing nationals from its member states in years ending with 3 and 8; most recently, María Fernanda Espinosa of Ecuador was elected to this position in 2018.

Member states of the Latin American and Caribbean Group are as follows:

- Antigua and Barbuda
- Argentina
- The Bahamas
- Barbados
- Belize
- Bolivia
- Brazil
- Chile
- Colombia
- Costa Rica
- Cuba
- Dominica
- Dominican Republic
- Ecuador
- El Salvador
- Grenada
- Guatemala
- Guyana
- Haiti
- Honduras
- Jamaica
- Mexico
- Nicaragua
- Panama
- Paraguay
- Peru
- Saint Kitts and Nevis
- Saint Lucia
- Saint Vincent and the Grenadines
- Suriname
- Trinidad and Tobago
- Uruguay
- Venezuela

=== Western European and Others Group (WEOG) ===
The Western European and Others Group, or WEOG, consists of 28 member states (15% of all UN members). Its territory is composed of land dispersed on all of the continents, but mostly centered in Western Europe and Northern America. Additionally, the United States acts as an observer, as it is not formally part of any regional group.

Including the United States, the Western European and Others Group has five seats on the Security Council: three permanent seats (France, the United Kingdom, and the United States) and two non-permanent seats. The group also has 13 seats on the Economic and Social Council and 7 seats on the Human Rights Council. In the rotation for the election of the President of the United Nations General Assembly, the group is responsible for electing nationals from its member states in years ending with 0 and 5; most recently, Annalena Baerbock of Germany was elected to this position in 2025.

Member states of the Western European and Others Group are as follows:

- Andorra
- Australia
- Austria
- Belgium
- Canada
- Denmark
- Finland
- **France**
- Germany
- Greece
- Iceland
- Ireland
- Israel (Note: In May 2000, Israel became a full member of the Group of Western European and other States on a temporary basis (subject to renewal), thereby enabling it to put forward candidates for election to various bodies of the General Assembly. In 2004, Israel obtained a permanent renewal to its membership.)
- Italy
- Liechtenstein
- Luxembourg
- Malta
- Monaco
- Netherlands
- New Zealand
- Norway
- Portugal
- San Marino
- Spain
- Sweden
- Switzerland
- Turkey
- **United Kingdom**
- **United States** (Note: The United States is not a member of any regional group, but attends meetings of the Group of Western European and other States as an observer and is considered to be a member of that group for electoral purposes.)

=== UN General Assembly observer states ===
==== Holy See ====
The Holy See participates in the Western European and Others Group as an observer only.

==== State of Palestine ====
The Palestine Liberation Organization has participated in the Asia and the Pacific Group since 2 April 1986 as an observer.

== Calls for reform ==
The great variation in size (from 23 to 54) between the regional groups is problematic in that it may mean equal representation is more difficult to achieve. Additionally, some of the groups might be in need of reform due to political changes within the group. Many members of the Eastern European Group have, in recent years, gradually aligned themselves with the Western European and Others Group due to their admission into the North Atlantic Treaty Organization and the European Union. Additionally, some members of the Western European and Others Group also feel disenfranchised due to increased coordination between European Union states that are in the group.

In 1995, the Australian Government proposed that the regional groups be reorganised in seven groups as follows:

- Western Europe (24 members)
- Central and Eastern Europe (22 members)
- Middle East and the Maghreb (19 members)
- Africa (43 members)
- Central Asia and the Indian Ocean (17 members)
- East Asia and Oceania (25 members)
- America (35 members)

This proposal would create a homogenous Middle Eastern group, as well as meet the demands of South Pacific states who have called for their own region.

In 1997, a Canadian study proposed that the regional groups be reorganised into nine groups as follows:

- Eurasia (21 members)
- Asia/Pacific (25 members)
- Mediterranean/Gulf (19 members)
- Northern Europe (20 members)
- Southern Europe (19 members)
- North Africa (23 members)
- Southern Africa (23 members)
- Americas (19 members)
- Caribbean (16 members)

This proposal would create groups of similar size, while also factoring in the local politics of the regions.

In 2000, the government of Nauru, in its general debate address, called for a new regional group for Oceania. This new group would give more representation to Pacific island nations, who are at present grouped together with the Middle East, Central Asia and East Asia, limiting their opportunities. Aside from Nauru, this proposed bloc may also include Australia and New Zealand (both in the WEOG), Japan, South Korea, the ASEAN countries, and the rest of Oceania.

== Gallery ==
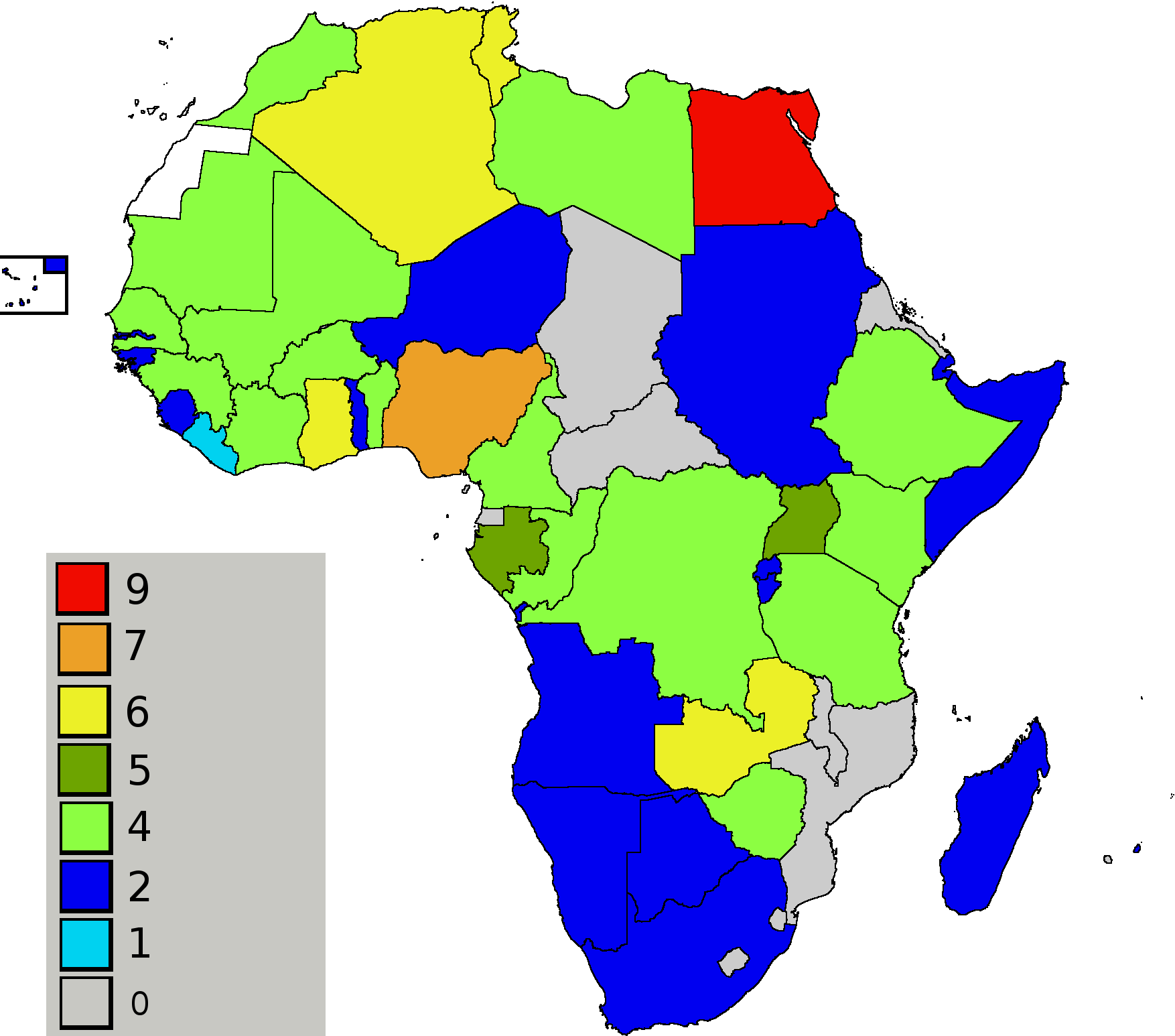
Members of the African Group colour-coded for the number of years each spent on the Security Council as of 2010

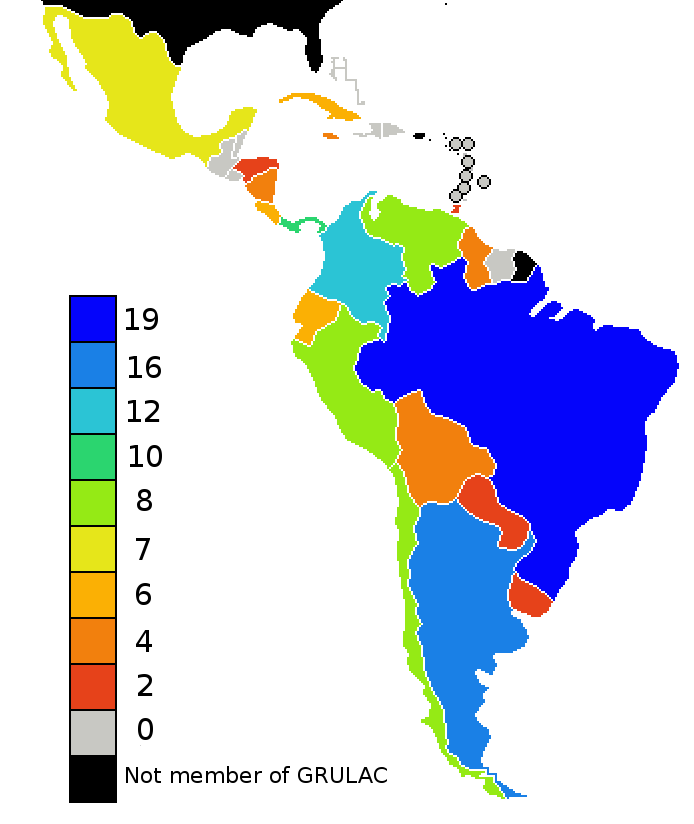
Members of the Latin American and Caribbean Group colour-coded for the number of years each spent on the Security Council as of 2010

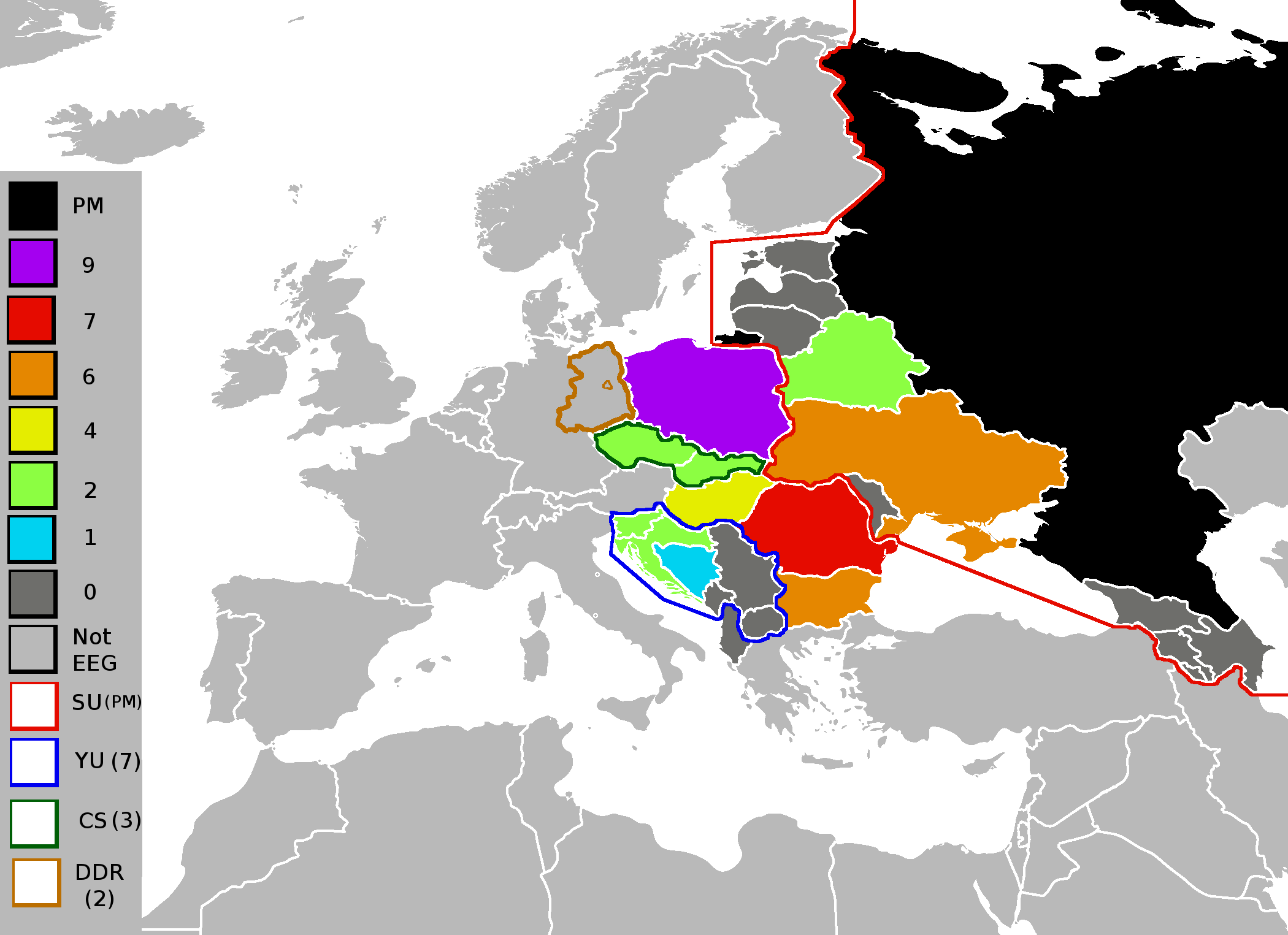
The Eastern European Group in 2010, with the years each member spent in the United Nations Security Council, including former members represented as outlines

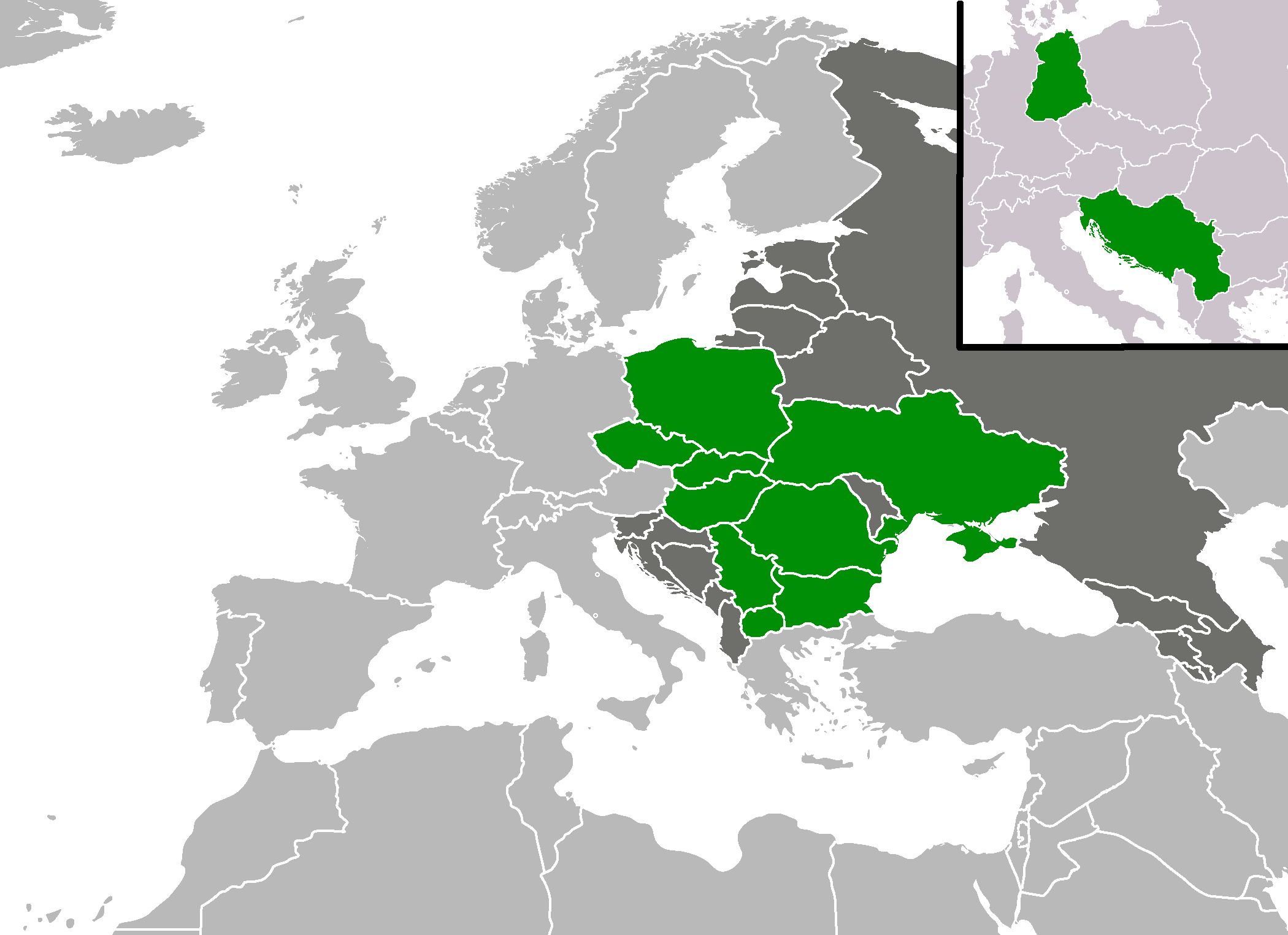
A map showing from which countries from the Eastern European Group has there been elected a President of the United Nations General Assembly as of September 2017

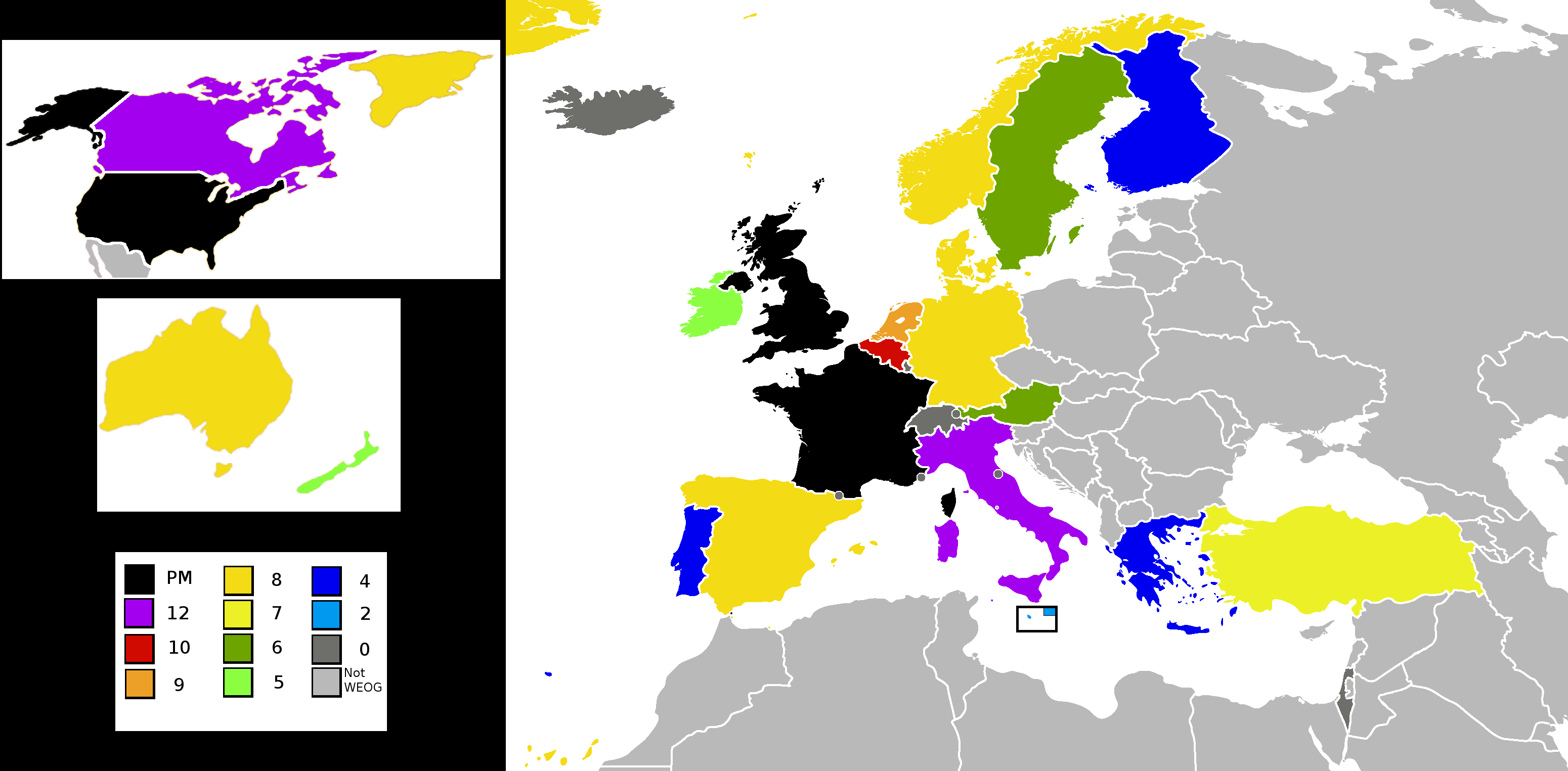
Members of the Western European and Others Group colour-coded for the number of years each spent on the Security Council as of 2010

== See also ==
- Board of Governors of the International Atomic Energy Agency
- Continental union
- List of members of the United Nations Commission on Human Rights
- List of members of the United Nations Economic and Social Council
- List of members of the United Nations Security Council
- United Nations geoscheme
  - List of countries and territories by the United Nations geoscheme
