= 2024 supranational electoral calendar =

List of supranational elections held in 2024

Supranational elections held in 2024.

== June ==
- 6 June: United Nations, Security Council
- 6-9 June: European Union, European Parliament
  - 6-9 June: Estonia, European Parliament
  - 6 June: Netherlands, European Parliament
  - 7 June: Ireland, European Parliament
  - 7-8 June: Czech Republic, European Parliament
  - 8 June:
    - Latvia, European Parliament
    - Malta, European Parliament
    - Slovakia, European Parliament
  - 8-9 June: Italy, European Parliament
  - 9 June:
    - Austria, European Parliament
    - Belgium, European Parliament
    - Bulgaria, European Parliament
    - Croatia, European Parliament
    - Cyprus, European Parliament
    - Denmark, European Parliament
    - Finland, European Parliament
    - France, European Parliament
    - Germany, European Parliament
    - Greece, European Parliament
    - Hungary, European Parliament
    - Lithuania, European Parliament
    - Luxembourg, European Parliament
    - Poland, European Parliament
    - Portugal, European Parliament
    - Romania, European Parliament
    - Slovenia, European Parliament
    - Spain, European Parliament
    - Sweden, European Parliament
