= 1979 United Nations Security Council election =

Election to the United Nations Security Council

← 1978	26 October 1979–7 January 1980	1980 →

5 (of 10) non-permanent seats on the United Nations Security Council
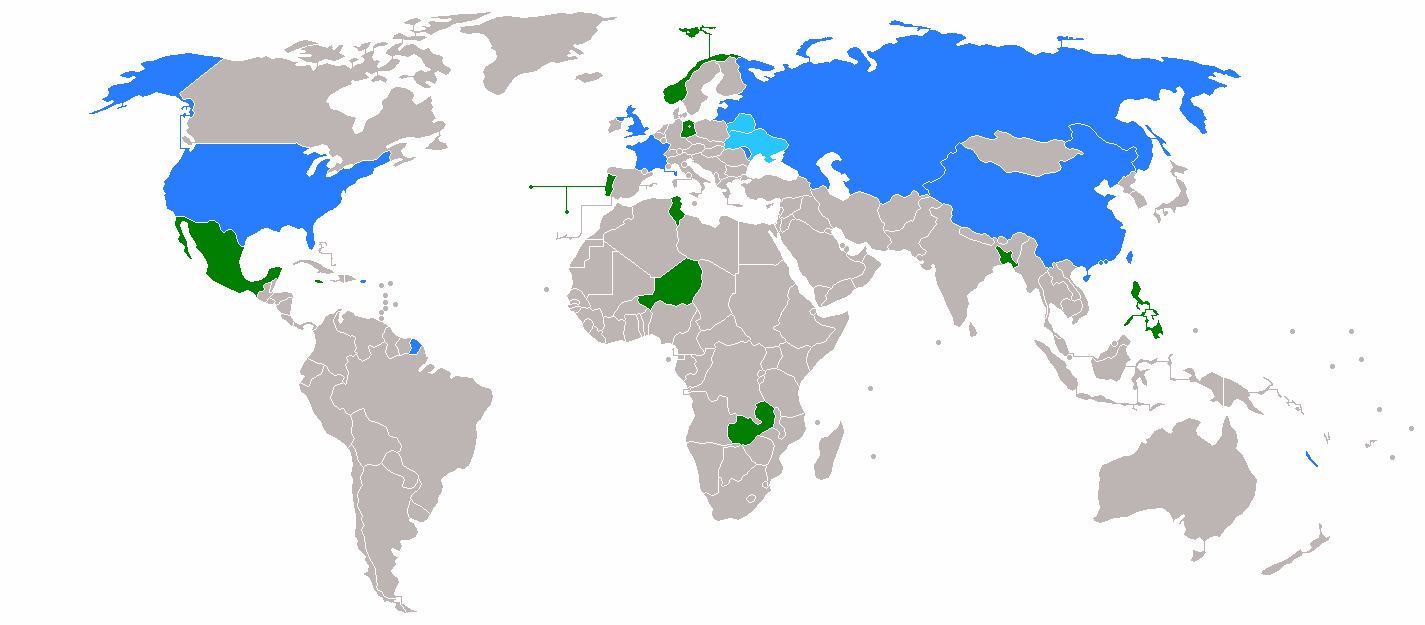
Members before election
Gabon (Africa)
Nigeria (Africa)
Kuwait (Asia, Arab)
Bolivia (LatAm&Car)
Czechoslovakia (E. Europe)
New Members
Niger (Africa)
Tunisia (Africa, Arab)
Philippines (Asia)
Mexico (LatAm&Car)
East Germany (E. Europe)

The 1979 United Nations Security Council election was held from 26 October 1979 to 7 January 1980 during the Thirty-fourth session of the United Nations General Assembly, held at United Nations Headquarters in New York City. The General Assembly elected East Germany, Mexico, Niger, the Philippines, and Tunisia, as the five new non-permanent members of the UN Security Council for two-year mandates commencing January 1980. Taking 155 rounds of voting to resolve, it remains the longest Security Council election in history. Additionally, this was the first time Niger was elected and the only time East Germany was elected member of the Council.

== Rules ==
The Security Council has 15 seats, filled by five permanent members and ten non-permanent members. Each year, half of the non-permanent members are elected for two-year terms. A sitting member may not immediately run for re-election.

In accordance with the rules whereby the ten non-permanent UNSC seats rotate among the various regional blocs into which UN member states traditionally divide themselves for voting and representation purposes, the five available seats are allocated as follows:

- Two for African countries, one of which being the "Arab Swing Seat" (held by Gabon and Nigeria)
- One for the Asian Group (now the Asia-Pacific Group) (held by Kuwait)
- One for Latin America and the Caribbean (held by Bolivia)
- One for the Eastern European Group (held by Czechoslovakia)

To be elected, a candidate must receive a two-thirds majority of those present and voting. If the vote is inconclusive after the first round, three rounds of restricted voting shall take place, followed by three rounds of unrestricted voting, and so on, until a result has been obtained. In restricted voting, only official candidates may be voted on, while in unrestricted voting, any member of the given regional group, with the exception of current Council members, may be voted on.

== Results ==
=== Day 1 ===
Member	Round 1	Round 2	Round 3	Round 4	Round 5
Tunisia	143	–	–	–	–
Niger	140	–	–	–	–
East Germany	133	–	–	–	–
Philippines	131	–	–	–	–
Cuba	77	79	78	79	80
Colombia	68	66	66	65	61
Peru	–	–	–	–	2
Yugoslavia	2	–	–	–	–
Brazil	–	–	–	–	1
Bulgaria	1	–	–	–	–
South Yemen	1	–	–	–	–
Jordan	1	–	–	–	–
Libya	1	–	–	–	–
Romania	1	–	–	–	–
Zaire	1	–	–	–	–
abstentions	0	3	3	4	3
invalid ballots	0	0	0	0	0
required majority	99	97	96	96	96
ballot papers	148	148	147	148	147

Member	Round 6	Round 7	Round 8	Round 9	Round 10	Round 11	Round 12	Round 13
Cuba	80	84	83	81	79	80	79	79
Colombia	62	60	61	63	66	65	64	65
abstentions	3	3	3	3	3	3	4	3
invalid ballots	0	1	0	0	0	0	0	0
required majority	95	96	96	96	97	97	96	96
ballot papers	145	148	147	147	148	148	147	147

=== Day 2 ===
Member	Round 14	Round 15	Round 16	Round 17	Round 18	Round 19
Cuba	74	79	79	78	79	76
Colombia	65	66	66	65	64	62
Saint Lucia	–	–	–	1	1	2
Chile	–	–	–	–	–	1
Peru	–	–	–	–	–	1
abstentions	3	3	3	3	3	3
invalid ballots	0	1	0	1	0	1
required majority	93	97	97	96	96	95
ballot papers	142	148	148	148	147	146

=== Day 3 ===
Member	Round 20	Round 21	Round 22	Round 23	Round 24	Round 25	Round 26	Round 27	Round 28
Cuba	77	78	78	80	79	80	80	80	80
Colombia	65	64	66	60	63	61	63	60	63
Mexico	–	–	–	2	1	1	–	–	–
Argentina	–	–	–	1	1	–	–	–	–
Chile	–	–	–	–	1	–	–	–	–
Guatemala	–	–	–	1	–	–	–	–	–
Honduras	–	–	–	1	–	–	–	–	–
Nicaragua	–	–	–	–	–	1	–	–	–
Paraguay	–	–	–	–	–	1	–	–	–
Saint Lucia	–	–	–	1	2	1	–	–	–
abstentions	2	3	3	1	1	1	3	2	1
invalid ballots	0	1	0	0	0	1	0	1	1
required majority	98	95	96	98	96	97	96	94	95
ballot papers	144	142	144	147	147	147	146	143	144

=== Day 4 ===
Member	Round 29	Round 30	Round 31	Round 32	Round 33	Round 34	Round 35	Round 36	Round 37	Round 38	Round 39	Round 40
Cuba	82	83	88	87	84	86	83	83	82	87	85	87
Colombia	63	60	57	58	63	59	56	57	57	57	62	60
Brazil	–	–	–	–	–	–	2	1	–	–	–	–
Saint Lucia	1	1	1	–	–	–	–	–	–	–	–	–
Peru	–	1	–	–	–	–	–	–	–	–	–	–
Chile	–	–	–	–	–	–	1	–	1	–	–	–
Mexico	–	–	1	–	–	–	1	1	1	–	–	–
Venezuela	–	–	–	–	–	–	1	–	–	–	–	–
Uruguay	–	–	–	–	–	–	–	1	1	–	–	–
Paraguay	–	–	–	–	–	–	–	–	1	–	–	–
abstentions	1	1	1	3	1	2	2	1	2	2	1	1
invalid ballots	0	0	0	0	0	0	0	0	0	0	0	0
required majority	98	97	98	97	98	97	96	96	96	96	98	98
ballot papers	147	146	148	148	147	147	146	144	145	146	148	148

=== Day 5 ===
Member	Round 41	Round 42	Round 43	Round 44	Round 45	Round 46	Round 47	Round 48	Round 49	Round 50	Round 51	Round 52	Round 53	Round 54	Round 55	Round 56	Round 57	Round 58	Round 59
Cuba	83	85	85	86	86	86	82	86	80	79	82	80	82	82	80	81	84	81	84
Colombia	58	58	58	59	61	60	62	60	61	65	63	63	63	60	62	59	62	62	62
Uruguay	1	1	1	–	–	–	1	–	–	–	–	–	–	–	–	–	–	–	–
Argentina	–	–	1	–	–	–	–	–	–	–	–	–	–	–	–	–	–	–	–
Mexico	–	–	–	–	–	–	–	–	–	–	–	–	–	1	1	–	–	–	–
Saint Lucia	–	–	–	–	–	–	–	–	–	–	–	–	–	1	–	–	–	–	–
Brazil	–	–	–	–	–	–	–	–	–	–	–	–	–	–	1	1	–	–	–
Nicaragua	–	–	–	–	–	–	–	–	–	–	–	–	–	–	1	–	–	–	–
El Salvador	–	–	–	–	–	–	–	–	–	–	–	–	–	–	–	1	–	–	–
abstentions	3	3	2	1	2	2	2	2	1	1	2	2	1	2	2	2	1	2	1
invalid ballots	0	0	0	0	0	0	1	0	0	0	0	0	0	0	0	0	0	0	0
required majority	95	96	97	97	98	98	97	98	94	96	97	96	97	96	97	97	98	96	98
ballot papers	145	147	147	145	149	148	148	148	142	145	147	145	146	146	147	147	148	145	147

=== Day 6 ===
Member	Round 60	Round 61	Round 62	Round 63	Round 64	Round 65	Round 66	Round 67	Round 68	Round 69	Round 70	Round 71
Cuba	88	86	83	85	82	81	82	79	81	81	79	82
Colombia	57	58	58	60	61	61	58	58	57	60	58	64
Brazil	–	–	–	–	–	–	1	2	3	–	–	–
Suriname	–	1	2	–	–	–	1	–	–	–	–	–
Uruguay	1	1	1	–	–	–	–	–	–	–	–	–
Honduras	–	–	1	–	–	–	1	–	–	–	–	–
El Salvador	–	–	–	–	–	–	1	–	–	–	–	–
Chile	–	–	–	–	–	–	–	1	–	–	–	–
Saint Lucia	–	–	–	–	–	–	–	–	1	–	–	–
abstentions	1	1	1	1	3	3	2	2	2	4	2	1
invalid ballots	0	0	0	0	0	0	0	2	1	1	2	0
required majority	98	98	97	97	96	95	96	94	96	94	92	98
ballot papers	147	147	146	146	146	146	146	144	146	146	141	147

== See also ==
- List of members of the United Nations Security Council
- Germany and the United Nations
- Mexico and the United Nations
- Philippines and the United Nations
