= 1963 United Nations Security Council election =

Election to the United Nations Security Council

← 1962	18, 25 October; 1 November 1963	1964 →

Three of six non-permanent seats on the United Nations Security Council
Members before election
Philippines (Asia)
Ghana (Africa)
Venezuela (LatAm&Car)
New Members
Czechoslovakia (EEG)
Ivory Coast (Africa)
Bolivia (LatAm&Car)

The 1963 United Nations Security Council election was held on 18 October, 30 October, and 1 November during the eighteenth session of the United Nations General Assembly, held at United Nations Headquarters in New York City. The General Assembly elected four members through consultation of the president, as non-permanent members of the UN Security Council for two-year mandates commencing on 1 January 1964.

== Rules ==
The Security Council had eleven seats, filled by five permanent members and six non-permanent members. Each year, half of the non-permanent members are elected for two-year terms. A sitting member may not immediately run for re-election. Candidates must reach a required two-thirds majority to be elected to the United Nations Security Council.

== Result ==
At this time, the United Nations had 113 member states (for a timeline of UN membership, see Enlargement of the United Nations). There were three open seats, as the Philippines, Ghana, and Venezuela were retiring. Mr. Dashtseren (Mongolia) and Mr. Lynch-Shyllon (Sierra Leone) served as tellers. The first ballot was unrestricted, with seven candidacies for three seats. The Ivory Coast and Bolivia were elected to permanent seats and Czechoslovakia and Malaysia moved on to a restricted second round of voting. After three unclear ballots, the council reverted to an unrestricted ballot. As no nation received a majority, the elections were suspended for another day. The General Assembly reconvened on 25 October 1963, and held five further ballots, and again on November 1, when a third member was elected.

Member	Round 1	Round 2	Round 3	Round 4	Round 5	Round 6	Round 7	Round 8	Round 9	Round 10	Round 10	Round 12
Ivory Coast	92	—	—	—	—	—	—	—	—	—	—	—
Bolivia	86	—	—	—	—	—	—	—	—	—	—	—
Czechoslovakia	63	55	55	54	56	56	58	56	56	58	56	89
Malaysia	56	52	52	54	51	55	52	54	54	51	53	10
Indonesia	1	—	—	—	—	—	—	—	—	—	—	—
Lebanon	1	—	—	—	1	—	—	—	—	—	—	—
Nigeria	1	—	—	—	—	—	—	—	—	—	—	—
Cambodia	—	—	—	—	1	—	—	—	—	—	—	—
Honduras	—	—	—	—	—	—	—	—	—	—	1	—
Ballots	109	109	109	110	110	111	110	110	110	109	110	102
Abstentions	1	2	2	2	1	0	0	0	0	0	0	3
Votes	108	107	107	108	109	111	110	110	110	109	110	99

== See also ==
- List of members of the United Nations Security Council
