= List of members of the United Nations Security Council =

Membership of the United Nations Security Council is held by the five permanent members and ten elected, non-permanent members.

Being elected requires a two-thirds majority vote from the United Nations General Assembly. Elected members hold their place on the council for a two-year term, with five seats contested in even years and five seats contested in odd years. An outgoing member cannot be immediately re-elected.

Elections usually begin in June for a term starting 1 January. Because of the two-thirds majority requirement, it is possible for two evenly matched candidates to deadlock with approximately half the vote each, sometimes needing weeks of negotiations to resolve.

Non-permanent seats are distributed geographically, with a certain number of seats allocated to each of the five United Nations Regional Groups.

== Current membership ==
Permanent members

Country	Regional Group	Member since
China	Asia-Pacific Group	25 October 1971, replaced the Republic of China
France	Western European and Others Group	24 October 1945
Russia	Eastern European Group	26 December 1991, replaced the Soviet Union
United Kingdom	Western European and Others Group	24 October 1945
United States	Western European and Others Group	24 October 1945

Non-permanent members

Country	Regional Group	Term began	Term ends
Bahrain	Asia-Pacific Group (Arab)	2026	2027
Colombia	Latin American and Caribbean Group (GRULAC)	2026	2027
Democratic Republic of the Congo	African Group	2026	2027
Denmark	Western European and Others Group (WEOG)	2025	2026
Greece	Western European and Others Group (WEOG)	2025	2026
Latvia	Eastern European Group (EEG)	2026	2027
Liberia	African Group	2026	2027
Pakistan	Asia-Pacific Group	2025	2026
Panama	Latin American and Caribbean Group (GRULAC)	2025	2026
Somalia	African Group	2025	2026

== Regional Groups ==
African Group Asia-Pacific Group Eastern European Group Latin American and Caribbean Group (GRULAC) Western European and Others Group UN member not in any voting group Observer states Non-UN state or territory

The ten non-permanent seats have the following distribution:

- African Group: 3 members
- Asia-Pacific Group: 2 members
- Eastern European Group: 1 member
- Latin American and Caribbean Group (GRULAC): 2 members
- Western European and Others Group (WEOG): 2 members

In addition, one of the five African/Asian seats is an Arab country, alternating between the two groups. This rule was added in 1967 for it to be applied beginning with 1968.

Electoral timetable

Term beginning in years that are:	Odd	Even
African Group	one member	two members *
Asia-Pacific Group	one member	one member *
Eastern European Group	none	one member
Latin American and Caribbean Group (GRULAC)	one member	one member
Western European and Others Group	two members	none

* The representative of Arab nations alternates between these two spaces.

The odd/even distribution was effectively decided by the January 1946 and 1965 elections (the first ever election, and the first election after the expansion of seats). For each of the six and four members in the newly created seats, the UN General Assembly voted to grant either a 1-year or 2-year term.

== Previous Security Council composition ==
From 1946 to 1965, the Security Council had six non-permanent members. Due to a lack of African and Asian member states, the seats had the following distribution:

- Latin America: 2 members
- Commonwealth of Nations: 1 member
- Eastern Europe: 1 member
- Middle East: 1 member
- Western Europe: 1 member

As decolonization increased the number of Asian and African member states without a group, they began to contest other seats: Ivory Coast substituted a member of the Commonwealth in 1964–1965, the Eastern European seat regularly included Asian countries from 1956, Liberia took the place of a Western European country in 1961, and Mali successfully contested the Middle Eastern seat in December 1964 (the Security Council would be expanded before Mali's term began).

An amendment to the UN Charter ratified in 1965 increased the number of non-permanent seats to 10, and the Regional Groups were formally applied to the seats. The amendment effectively created three African seats and one Asian seat, if treating the Commonwealth seat as a WEOG seat and the Middle Eastern seat as an Asian seat. (In practice, the Commonwealth seat was by then treated as a de facto African seat.)

== Membership by year ==
=== Permanent ===
Year	Chinese seat	French seat	Soviet/Russian seat	British seat	American seat
1945	Republic of China	Prov. Gov. of France	Union of Soviet Socialist Republics	United Kingdom	United States
1946	Republic of China	French Fourth Republic	Union of Soviet Socialist Republics	United Kingdom	United States
1949	Republic of China (Taiwan)	French Fourth Republic	Union of Soviet Socialist Republics	United Kingdom	United States
1958	Republic of China (Taiwan)	French Fifth Republic	Union of Soviet Socialist Republics	United Kingdom	United States
1971	People's Republic of China	French Fifth Republic	Union of Soviet Socialist Republics	United Kingdom	United States
1991–present	People's Republic of China	French Fifth Republic	Russian Federation	United Kingdom	United States

=== Non-permanent (1946–1965) ===
Year	Latin American seats		Commonwealth seat	Eastern European & Asian seat (Note: Asian countries successfully contested the Eastern European seat from 1956 onwards.)	Middle Eastern seat	Western European seat
1946	Brazil	Mexico	Australia	Poland	Egypt	Netherlands
1947	Brazil	Colombia	Australia	Poland	Syria	Belgium
1948	Argentina	Colombia	Canada	Ukrainian Soviet Socialist Republic	Syria	Belgium
1949	Argentina	Cuba	Canada	Ukrainian Soviet Socialist Republic	Egypt	Norway
1950	Ecuador	Cuba	India	Yugoslavia	Egypt	Norway
1951	Ecuador	Brazil	India	Yugoslavia	Turkey	Netherlands
1952	Chile	Brazil	Pakistan	Greece	Turkey	Netherlands
1953	Chile	Colombia	Pakistan	Greece	Lebanon	Denmark
1954	Brazil	Colombia	New Zealand	Turkey	Lebanon	Denmark
1955	Brazil	Peru	New Zealand	Turkey	Iran	Belgium
1956	Cuba	Peru	Australia	Yugoslavia	Iran	Belgium
1957	Cuba	Colombia	Australia	Philippines	Iraq	Sweden
1958	Panama	Colombia	Canada	Japan	Iraq	Sweden
1959	Panama	Argentina	Canada	Japan	Tunisia (Note: Tunisia and Morocco were treated as Middle Eastern countries due to being members of the Arab League.)	Italy
1960	Ecuador	Argentina	Ceylon	Poland	Tunisia	Italy
1961	Ecuador	Chile	Ceylon	Turkey	United Arab Republic	Liberia (Note: Liberia took the place of the Western European country in 1961)
1962	Venezuela	Chile	Ghana	Romania	United Arab Republic	Ireland
1963	Venezuela	Brazil	Ghana	Philippines	Morocco	Norway
1964	Bolivia	Brazil	Ivory Coast (Note: Ivory Coast took the place of a member of the Commonwealth in 1964–1965.)	Czechoslovakia	Morocco	Norway
1965	Bolivia	Uruguay	Ivory Coast	Malaysia	Jordan	Netherlands

=== Non-permanent (1966–present) ===
The African Union uses an internal rotation system to distribute seats based on its subregions:

- 1 odd-year seat alternates between Eastern Africa and Southern Africa (only Eastern Africa prior to the creation of the Southern Africa subregion in 1979)
- 1 even-year seat is allocated to Western Africa
- 1 even-year seat alternates between Northern Africa (the Arab nation seat) and Central Africa (with one exception at the beginning in 1966)

Aside from the Asia-Pacific Group also allocating an Arab nation seat every four years (in even years not divisible by 4), other regional groups do not have their own subregional rotation systems. The Arab nation seat is starred below.

The Western European and Others Group in part contains three caucusing subgroups (Benelux, the Nordic countries, and CANZ), whose candidates informally coordinate with each other. While this has not resulted in a stable rotation system, it effectively guarantees that both seats will never be occupied by a single subgroup at the same time.

Year	African Group			Asia-Pacific Group		Latin American and Caribbean Group (GRULAC)		Western European and Others Group		Eastern European Group
Year	Eastern/Southern	Western	Northern/Central	Asia-Pacific Group		Latin American and Caribbean Group (GRULAC)		Western European and Others Group		Eastern European Group
1966	Uganda	Mali	Nigeria (Note: Part of Western Africa, not Central Africa)	Japan	Jordan*	Argentina	Uruguay	Netherlands	New Zealand	Bulgaria
1967	Ethiopia	Mali	Nigeria	Japan	India	Argentina	Brazil	Canada	Denmark	Bulgaria
1968	Ethiopia	Senegal	Algeria*	Pakistan	India	Paraguay	Brazil	Canada	Denmark	Hungary
1969	Zambia	Senegal	Algeria*	Pakistan	Nepal	Paraguay	Colombia	Finland	Spain	Hungary
1970	Zambia	Sierra Leone	Burundi	Syria*	Nepal	Nicaragua	Colombia	Finland	Spain	Poland
1971	Somalia	Sierra Leone	Burundi	Syria*	Japan	Nicaragua	Argentina	Belgium	Italy	Poland
1972	Somalia	Guinea	Sudan*	India	Japan	Panama	Argentina	Belgium	Italy	Yugoslavia
1973	Kenya	Guinea	Sudan*	India	Indonesia	Panama	Peru	Australia	Austria	Yugoslavia
1974	Kenya	Mauritania	Cameroon	Iraq*	Indonesia	Costa Rica	Peru	Australia	Austria	Byelorussian Soviet Socialist Republic
1975	Tanzania	Mauritania	Cameroon	Iraq*	Japan	Costa Rica	Guyana	Italy	Sweden	Byelorussian Soviet Socialist Republic
1976	Tanzania	Benin	Libya*	Pakistan	Japan	Panama	Guyana	Italy	Sweden	Romania
1977	Mauritius	Benin	Libya*	Pakistan	India	Panama	Venezuela	Canada	West Germany	Romania
1978	Mauritius	Nigeria	Gabon	Kuwait*	India	Bolivia	Venezuela	Canada	West Germany	Czechoslovakia
1979	Zambia	Nigeria	Gabon	Kuwait*	Bangladesh	Bolivia	Jamaica	Norway	Portugal	Czechoslovakia
1980	Zambia	Niger	Tunisia*	Philippines	Bangladesh	Mexico	Jamaica	Norway	Portugal	East Germany
1981	Uganda	Niger	Tunisia*	Philippines	Japan	Mexico	Panama	Ireland	Spain	East Germany
1982	Uganda	Togo	Zaire	Jordan*	Japan	Guyana	Panama	Ireland	Spain	Poland
1983	Zimbabwe	Togo	Zaire	Jordan*	Pakistan	Guyana	Nicaragua	Malta	Netherlands	Poland
1984	Zimbabwe	Burkina Faso (Note: At the time of election, and until 2 August 1984, the country was known as Upper Volta.)	Egypt*	India	Pakistan	Peru	Nicaragua	Malta	Netherlands	Ukrainian Soviet Socialist Republic
1985	Madagascar	Burkina Faso	Egypt*	India	Thailand	Peru	Trinidad and Tobago	Australia	Denmark	Ukrainian Soviet Socialist Republic
1986	Madagascar	Ghana	Congo	United Arab Emirates*	Thailand	Venezuela	Trinidad and Tobago	Australia	Denmark	Bulgaria
1987	Zambia	Ghana	Congo	United Arab Emirates*	Japan	Venezuela	Argentina	West Germany	Italy	Bulgaria
1988	Zambia	Senegal	Algeria*	Nepal	Japan	Brazil	Argentina	West Germany	Italy	Yugoslavia
1989	Ethiopia	Senegal	Algeria*	Nepal	Malaysia	Brazil	Colombia	Canada	Finland	Yugoslavia
1990	Ethiopia	Ivory Coast	Zaire	Yemen* (Note: The election was secured by Democratic Yemen, and in 22 May 1990, during its membership of the Security Council, it unified with Yemen (i.e., North Yemen) to form the single country of Yemen.)	Malaysia	Cuba	Colombia	Canada	Finland	Romania
1991	Zimbabwe	Ivory Coast	Zaire	Yemen*	India	Cuba	Ecuador	Austria	Belgium	Romania
1992	Zimbabwe	Cape Verde	Morocco*	Japan	India	Venezuela	Ecuador	Austria	Belgium	Hungary
1993	Djibouti	Cape Verde	Morocco*	Japan	Pakistan	Venezuela	Brazil	New Zealand	Spain	Hungary
1994	Djibouti	Nigeria	Rwanda	Oman*	Pakistan	Argentina	Brazil	New Zealand	Spain	Czech Republic
1995	Botswana	Nigeria	Rwanda	Oman*	Indonesia	Argentina	Honduras	Germany	Italy	Czech Republic
1996	Botswana	Guinea-Bissau	Egypt*	South Korea	Indonesia	Chile	Honduras	Germany	Italy	Poland
1997	Kenya	Guinea-Bissau	Egypt*	South Korea	Japan	Chile	Costa Rica	Portugal	Sweden	Poland
1998	Kenya	The Gambia	Gabon	Bahrain*	Japan	Brazil	Costa Rica	Portugal	Sweden	Slovenia
1999	Namibia	The Gambia	Gabon	Bahrain*	Malaysia	Brazil	Argentina	Canada	Netherlands	Slovenia
2000	Namibia	Mali	Tunisia*	Bangladesh	Malaysia	Jamaica	Argentina	Canada	Netherlands	Ukraine
2001	Mauritius	Mali	Tunisia*	Bangladesh	Singapore	Jamaica	Colombia	Ireland	Norway	Ukraine
2002	Mauritius	Guinea	Cameroon	Syria*	Singapore	Mexico	Colombia	Ireland	Norway	Bulgaria
2003	Angola	Guinea	Cameroon	Syria*	Pakistan	Mexico	Chile	Germany	Spain	Bulgaria
2004	Angola	Benin	Algeria*	Philippines	Pakistan	Brazil	Chile	Germany	Spain	Romania
2005	Tanzania	Benin	Algeria*	Philippines	Japan	Brazil	Argentina	Denmark	Greece	Romania
2006	Tanzania	Ghana	Congo	Qatar*	Japan	Peru	Argentina	Denmark	Greece	Slovakia
2007	South Africa	Ghana	Congo	Qatar*	Indonesia	Peru	Panama	Belgium	Italy	Slovakia
2008	South Africa	Burkina Faso	Libya*	Vietnam	Indonesia	Costa Rica	Panama	Belgium	Italy	Croatia
2009	Uganda	Burkina Faso	Libya*	Vietnam	Japan	Costa Rica	Mexico	Austria	Turkey	Croatia
2010	Uganda	Nigeria	Gabon	Lebanon*	Japan	Brazil	Mexico	Austria	Turkey	Bosnia and Herzegovina
2011	South Africa	Nigeria	Gabon	Lebanon*	India	Brazil	Colombia	Germany	Portugal	Bosnia and Herzegovina
2012	South Africa	Togo	Morocco*	Pakistan	India	Guatemala	Colombia	Germany	Portugal	Azerbaijan
2013	Rwanda	Togo	Morocco*	Pakistan	South Korea	Guatemala	Argentina	Australia	Luxembourg	Azerbaijan
2014	Rwanda	Nigeria	Chad	Jordan*	South Korea	Chile	Argentina	Australia	Luxembourg	Lithuania
2015	Angola	Nigeria	Chad	Jordan*	Malaysia	Chile	Venezuela	New Zealand	Spain	Lithuania
2016	Angola	Senegal	Egypt*	Japan	Malaysia	Uruguay	Venezuela	New Zealand	Spain	Ukraine
2017	Ethiopia	Senegal	Egypt*	Japan	Kazakhstan	Uruguay	Bolivia	Italy	Sweden	Ukraine
2018	Ethiopia	Ivory Coast	Equatorial Guinea	Kuwait*	Kazakhstan	Peru	Bolivia	Netherlands	Sweden	Poland
2019	South Africa	Ivory Coast	Equatorial Guinea	Kuwait*	Indonesia	Peru	Dominican Republic	Belgium	Germany	Poland
2020	South Africa	Niger	Tunisia*	Vietnam	Indonesia	Saint Vincent and the Grenadines	Dominican Republic	Belgium	Germany	Estonia
2021	Kenya	Niger	Tunisia*	Vietnam	India	Saint Vincent and the Grenadines	Mexico	Ireland	Norway	Estonia
2022	Kenya	Ghana	Gabon	United Arab Emirates*	India	Brazil	Mexico	Ireland	Norway	Albania
2023	Mozambique	Ghana	Gabon	United Arab Emirates*	Japan	Brazil	Ecuador	Malta	Switzerland	Albania
2024	Mozambique	Sierra Leone	Algeria*	South Korea	Japan	Guyana	Ecuador	Malta	Switzerland	Slovenia
2025	Somalia	Sierra Leone	Algeria*	South Korea	Pakistan	Guyana	Panama	Denmark	Greece	Slovenia
2026	Somalia	Liberia	Democratic Republic of the Congo	Bahrain*	Pakistan	Colombia	Panama	Denmark	Greece	Latvia
2027	Zimbabwe	Liberia	Democratic Republic of the Congo	Bahrain*	Kyrgyzstan	Colombia	Trinidad and Tobago	Austria	Portugal	Latvia

== List by number of years as Security Council member ==
This list contains the 139 United Nations member states so far elected to the United Nations Security Council, including the five permanent members, all listed by number of years each country has so far spent on the UNSC. Of all the members, 6 have so far ceased to exist, leaving the list with 133 modern nations. These, combined with the 60 modern nations that have never been elected to the UNSC to date (see Non-members, below), make up the 193 current members of the UN.

Years on the Security Council, as of 2026, including current year where relevant :

Indicates permanent member
Indicates current elected member (2026)
Indicates former United Nations member

Years (Note: Table shows years completed or in progress. Each term on the Council consist of 2 years. Any odd number of years are countries currently serving the first year of a term, countries with terms between 1956 and 1967, when the order of the council changed, or the three countries (Mexico, Egypt and the Netherlands) who had the first terms in 1946 and changed in 1947.)	Country	First Year	Most Recent Year	Regional Group	Notes
81	France	1945	2026	WEOG	Permanent member
81	United Kingdom	1945	2026	WEOG	Permanent member
81	United States	1945	2026	WEOG	Permanent member
55	China	1971	2026	Asia-Pacific	Permanent member
46	Union of Soviet Socialist Republics	1945	1991	E. European	Former permanent member, replaced by the Russian Federation
35	Russia	1991	2026	E. European	Permanent member
26	Republic of China	1945	1971	None	Former permanent member, replaced by the People's Republic of China
24	Japan	1958	2024	Asia-Pacific	
22	Brazil	1946	2023	GRULAC	
18	Argentina	1948	2014	GRULAC	
16	India	1950	2022	Asia-Pacific	
16	Pakistan	1952	2026	Asia-Pacific	
15	Colombia	1947	2026	GRULAC	
13	Italy	1959	2017	WEOG	
12	Belgium	1947	2020	WEOG	
12	Canada	1948	2000	WEOG	
12	Germany	1977	2020	WEOG	Includes 4 years when the Federal Republic of Germany consisted only of West Germany (but does not include East Germany's 2 years, listed separately below).
12	Panama	1958	2026	GRULAC	
11	Poland	1946	2019	E. European	
10	Australia	1946	2014	WEOG	
10	Denmark	1953	2026	WEOG	
10	Chile	1952	2015	GRULAC	
10	Netherlands	1946	2018	WEOG	
10	Nigeria	1966	2015	African	
10	Norway	1949	2022	WEOG	
10	Peru	1955	2019	GRULAC	
10	Spain	1969	2016	WEOG	
10	Venezuela	1962	2016	GRULAC	
9	Egypt	1946	2017	African (Arab)	Excludes 2 years with the seat held in the name of the United Arab Republic, of which for more than 15 months UAR served as the name of modern-day Egypt
9	Mexico	1946	2022	GRULAC	
8	Algeria	1968	2025	African (Arab)	
8	Ecuador	1950	2024	GRULAC	
8	Gabon	1978	2023	African	
8	Ghana	1962	2023	African	
8	Indonesia	1973	2020	Asia-Pacific	
8	Sweden	1957	2018	WEOG	
8	Ukraine	1948	2017	E. European	Includes 4 years of membership under the name of the Ukrainian Soviet Socialist Republic; the Ukrainian SSR held its own seat in the General Assembly while being part of the Union of Soviet Socialist Republics during its 46 years of Security Council membership
8	Tunisia	1959	2021	African (Arab)	
7	Ireland	1962	2022	WEOG	
7	Malaysia	1965	2016	Asia-Pacific	
7	New Zealand	1954	2016	WEOG	
7	Romania	1962	2005	E. European	
7	Turkey	1951	2010	WEOG	
7	Yugoslavia	1950	1989	E. European	Predecessor of Bosnia and Herzegovina, Croatia, Montenegro, North Macedonia, Serbia, and Slovenia
6	Austria	1973	2010	WEOG	
6	Bolivia	1964	2018	GRULAC	
6	Bulgaria	1966	2003	E. European	
6	Costa Rica	1974	2009	GRULAC	
6	Ivory Coast	1964	2019	African	
6	Cuba	1949	1991	GRULAC	
6	Ethiopia	1967	2018	African	
6	Greece	1952	2026	WEOG	
6	Guyana	1975	2025	GRULAC	
6	Jordan	1965	2015	Asia-Pacific (Arab)	
6	Kenya	1973	2022	African	
6	South Korea	1996	2025	Asia-Pacific	
6	Morocco	1963	2013	African (Arab)	
6	Philippines	1957	2005	Asia-Pacific	
6	Portugal	1979	2012	WEOG	
6	Senegal	1968	2017	African	
6	South Africa	2007	2020	African	
6	Syria	1947	2003	Asia-Pacific (Arab)	Excludes one year (1961) during which the United Arab Republic was a member, for the greater part of which Syria was a member of that union
6	Zambia	1969	1988	African	
5	Democratic Republic of the Congo	1982	2026	African	Previously known as Zaire during its 4 years of Security Council membership
5	Uganda	1966	2010	African	
4	Angola	2003	2016	African	
4	Bangladesh	1979	2001	Asia-Pacific	
4	Benin	1976	2005	African	
4	Burkina Faso	1984	2009	African	For the first 7 months of membership of the Security Council in 1984 was known as Upper Volta.
4	Cameroon	1974	2003	African	
4	Congo	1986	2007	African	
4	Finland	1969	1990	WEOG	
4	Guinea	1972	2003	African	
4	Hungary	1968	1993	E. European	
4	Iraq	1957	1975	Asia-Pacific (Arab)	
4	Jamaica	1979	2001	GRULAC	
4	Kuwait	1978	2019	Asia-Pacific (Arab)	
4	Lebanon	1953	2011	Asia-Pacific (Arab)	
4	Libya	1976	2009	African (Arab)	
4	Mali	1966	2001	African	
4	Malta	1983	2024	WEOG	
4	Mauritius	1977	2002	African	
4	Nepal	1969	1989	Asia-Pacific	
4	Nicaragua	1970	1984	GRULAC	
4	Niger	1980	2021	African	
4	Rwanda	1994	2014	African	
4	Sierra Leone	1970	2025	African	
4	Slovenia	1998	2025	E. European	Was part of Yugoslavia during its 7 years of Security Council membership
4	Somalia	1971	2026	African	
4	Tanzania	1975	2006	African	
4	Togo	1982	2013	African	
4	United Arab Emirates	1986	2023	Asia-Pacific (Arab)	
4	Uruguay	1965	2017	GRULAC	
4	Vietnam	2008	2021	Asia-Pacific	
4	Zimbabwe	1983	1992	African	
3	Bahrain	1998	2026	Asia-Pacific (Arab)	
3	Czechoslovakia	1964	1979	E. European	Predecessor of the Czech Republic and Slovakia
2	Albania	2022	2023	E. European	
2	Azerbaijan	2012	2013	E. European	Was part of the Union of Soviet Socialist Republics during its 46 years of Security Council membership
2	Bosnia and Herzegovina	2010	2011	E. European	Was part of Yugoslavia during its 7 years of Security Council membership
2	Botswana	1995	1996	African	
2	Burundi	1970	1971	African	
2	Byelorussian Soviet Socialist Republic	1974	1975	E. European	Now known as Belarus; the Byelorussian Soviet Socialist Republic held its own seat in the General Assembly while being part of the Union of Soviet Socialist Republics during its 46 years of Security Council membership
2	Cape Verde	1992	1993	African	
2	Ceylon	1960	1961	Asia-Pacific	Now known as Sri Lanka
2	Chad	2014	2015	African	
2	Croatia	2008	2009	E. European	Was part of Yugoslavia during its 7 years of Security Council membership
2	Czech Republic	1994	1995	E. European	Was part of Czechoslovakia during its 3 years of Security Council membership
2	Djibouti	1993	1994	African	
2	Dominican Republic	2019	2020	GRULAC	
2	East Germany	1980	1981	E. European	Now subsumed into Germany, which has 8 years of Security Council membership since it has included the former territory of East Germany
2	Estonia	2020	2021	E. European	Was part of the Union of Soviet Socialist Republics during its 46 years of Security Council membership
2	Equatorial Guinea	2018	2019	African	
2	Gambia	1998	1999	African	
2	Guatemala	2012	2013	GRULAC	
2	Guinea-Bissau	1996	1997	African	
2	Honduras	1995	1996	GRULAC	
2	Iran	1955	1956	Asia-Pacific	
2	Kazakhstan	2017	2018	Asia-Pacific	Was part of the Union of Soviet Socialist Republics during its 46 years of Security Council membership
2	Liberia	1961	2026	African	
2	Lithuania	2014	2015	E. European	Was part of the Union of Soviet Socialist Republics during its 46 years of Security Council membership
2	Luxembourg	2013	2014	WEOG	
2	Madagascar	1985	1986	African	
2	Mauritania	1974	1975	African	
2	Mozambique	2023	2024	African	
2	Namibia	1999	2000	African	
2	Oman	1994	1995	Asia-Pacific (Arab)	
2	Paraguay	1968	1969	GRULAC	
2	Qatar	2006	2007	Asia-Pacific (Arab)	
2	Saint Vincent and the Grenadines	2020	2021	GRULAC	Smallest nation to have held a place on the Security Council
2	Singapore	2001	2002	Asia-Pacific	Was part of Malaysia for 8 months in 1965 during its membership of the Security Council
2	Slovakia	2006	2007	E. European	Was part of Czechoslovakia during its 3 years of Security Council membership
2	Sudan	1972	1973	African (Arab)	
2	Switzerland	2023	2024	WEOG	
2	Thailand	1985	1986	Asia-Pacific	
2	Trinidad and Tobago	1985	1986	GRULAC	
2	United Arab Republic	1961	1962	Middle East	Union of Syria and Egypt
1	Democratic Yemen	1990	1990	Asian (Arab)	Held the Security Council seat for the first five months of membership, then unified with Yemen (i.e., North Yemen) and passed the seat to Yemen.
1	Latvia	2026	2026	E. European	Was part of the Union of Soviet Socialist Republics during its 46 years of Security Council membership
1	Yemen	1990	1991	Asia-Pacific (Arab)	Inherited the seat from Democratic Yemen; served the remaining of the term, for one year and seven months.

== Future membership ==
Year	Africa	Asia-Pacific	Eastern Europe	Latin America & Caribbean	Western Europe & Others
The following countries have made known their applications for future United Nations Security Council membership:
2028–29	Libya; Morocco; Nigeria	India; Tajikistan	Slovakia	?	–
2029–30	?	Iran; Uzbekistan; Indonesia	–	?	Australia; Finland
2030–31	?	?	Croatia	?	–
2031–32	?	?	–	Guatemala	?
2032–33	Mauritania	Japan	Armenia	?	–
2037–38	?	?	–	?	Belgium

== UN members that have never been Security Council members ==
This is a list of the 60 member nations that have never been members of the Security Council. The three former UN members that were not elected to the Security Council during their membership are Tanganyika, Zanzibar, and Serbia and Montenegro.

Member states of the United Nations that have never been members of the United Nations Security Council as of 2026

Indicates future scheduled member (2027)

UN Member state	Regional Group	Security Council membership as part of another entity
Afghanistan	Asia-Pacific	
Andorra	WEOG	
Antigua and Barbuda	GRULAC	Was a crown colony, then an associated state of the United Kingdom of Great Britain and Northern Ireland during its 36 years of Security Council membership until 1 November 1981
Armenia	E. European	Was a union republic of the Union of Soviet Socialist Republics during its 45 years of Security Council membership until 23 September 1991
Bahamas	GRULAC	Was a crown colony of the United Kingdom of Great Britain and Northern Ireland during its 27 years of Security Council membership until 10 July 1973
Barbados	GRULAC	Was a crown colony of the United Kingdom of Great Britain and Northern Ireland during its 21 years of Security Council membership until 30 November 1966
Belize	GRULAC	Was a crown colony of the United Kingdom of Great Britain and Northern Ireland during its 35 years of Security Council membership until 21 September 1981
Bhutan	Asia-Pacific	Was a protected state of the United Kingdom of Great Britain and Northern Ireland during its 1 year of Security Council membership until 1947
Brunei	Asia-Pacific	Was a protectorate of the United Kingdom of Great Britain and Northern Ireland during its 38 years of Security Council membership until 1 January 1984
Cambodia	Asia-Pacific	Was a protectorate of France during its 8 years of Security Council membership until 9 November 1953
Central African Republic	African	Was a colony of France during its 14 years of Security Council membership until 13 August 1960
Comoros	African	Was an overseas territory of France during its 29 years of Security Council membership until 6 July 1975
Cyprus	Asia-Pacific	Was a crown colony of the United Kingdom of Great Britain and Northern Ireland during its 14 years of Security Council membership until 16 August 1960
Dominica	GRULAC	Was a crown colony, then an associated state of the United Kingdom of Great Britain and Northern Ireland during its 33 years of Security Council membership until 3 November 1978
East Timor	Asia-Pacific	Was a province of Indonesia (de facto) during its 2 years of Security Council membership and an overseas province of Portugal (de jure) during its 4 years of Security Council membership until 25 October 1999
El Salvador	GRULAC	
Eritrea	African	Was under military administration of the United Kingdom of Great Britain and Northern Ireland until 15 September 1952, then an autonomous region and then a province of Ethiopia during its 10 years of Security Council membership until 24 May 1993
Eswatini	African	Was a protectorate of the United Kingdom of Great Britain and Northern Ireland during its 22 years of Security Council membership until 6 September 1968
Fiji	Asia-Pacific	Was a crown colony of the United Kingdom of Great Britain and Northern Ireland during its 24 years of Security Council membership until 10 October 1970
Georgia	E. European	Was a union republic of the Union of Soviet Socialist Republics during its 45 years of Security Council membership until 9 April 1991
Grenada	GRULAC	Was a crown colony of the United Kingdom of Great Britain and Northern Ireland during its 28 years of Security Council membership until 7 February 1974
Haiti	GRULAC	
Iceland	WEOG	
Israel	None / WEOG (Note: Not a member of any regional group until joining the WEOG in 2000.)	Part of a League of Nations mandate under administration of the United Kingdom of Great Britain and Northern Ireland during its 2 years of Security Council membership until 14 May 1948
Kiribati	None / Asia-Pacific (Note: For over 20 years after joining the UN in 1999, Kiribati was not a member of any regional group before finally joining Asia-Pacific.)	Was a crown colony of the United Kingdom of Great Britain and Northern Ireland during its 33 years of Security Council membership until 12 July 1979
Kyrgyzstan	Asia-Pacific	Was a union republic of the Union of Soviet Socialist Republics during its 46 years of Security Council membership until 31 August 1991
Laos	Asia-Pacific	Was a protectorate of France during its 7 years of Security Council membership until 22 October 1953
Lesotho	African	Was a crown colony of the United Kingdom of Great Britain and Northern Ireland during its 20 years of Security Council until 4 October 1966
Liechtenstein	WEOG	
Malawi	African	Was a protectorate of the United Kingdom of Great Britain and Northern Ireland during its 18 years of Security Council membership until 6 July 1964
Maldives	Asia-Pacific	Was a protected state of the United Kingdom of Great Britain and Northern Ireland during its 19 years of Security Council membership until 26 July 1965
Marshall Islands	Asia-Pacific	Was a district of the Trust Territory of the Pacific Islands under the administration of the United States of America during its 40 years of Security Council membership until 21 October 1986
Federated States of Micronesia	Asia-Pacific	Was a district of the Trust Territory of the Pacific Islands under the administration of the United States of America during its 41 years of Security Council membership until 3 November 1986
Moldova	E. European	Was a union republic of the Union of Soviet Socialist Republics during its 45 years of Security Council membership until 27 August 1991
Monaco	WEOG	
Mongolia	Asia-Pacific	Was a Region of the Republic of China during its 4 months of Security Council membership until 5 January 1946
Montenegro	E. European	Was a republic of Yugoslavia during its 7 years of Security Council membership until 27 April 1992 (Note: Montenegro was also a constituent state of the Federal Republic of Yugoslavia and of Serbia and Montenegro from 27 April 1992 until 3 June 2006, but these entities were not members of the Security Council.)
Myanmar	Asia-Pacific	Was a crown colony of the United Kingdom of Great Britain and Northern Ireland during its 2 years of Security Council membership until 4 January 1948
Nauru	Asia-Pacific	Was a United Nations trust territory administered by the United Kingdom of Great Britain and Northern Ireland during its 22 years of Security Council membership, Australia during its 4 years of Security Council membership, and New Zealand during its 3 years of Security Council membership until 31 January 1968
North Korea	Asia-Pacific	Was under military occupation of the Union of Soviet Socialist Republics during its 2 years of Security Council membership until 9 September 1948
North Macedonia	E. European	Was a republic of Yugoslavia during its 7 years of Security Council membership until 8 September 1991
Palau	Asia-Pacific	Was a district of the Trust Territory of the Pacific Islands under the administration of the United States of America during its 48 years of Security Council membership until 1 October 1994
Papua New Guinea	Asia-Pacific	Was an external territory of Australia in the case of the Territory of Papua and a League of Nations mandate (later a United Nations trust territory during its union with Papua) in the case of the Territory of New Guinea during its 2 years of Security Council membership until 1 July 1949, then the unified Territory of Papua and New Guinea in Australia during its 4 years of Security Council membership until 16 September 1975
Saint Kitts and Nevis	GRULAC	Was a crown colony, then an associated state of the United Kingdom of Great Britain and Northern Ireland during its 37 years of Security Council membership until 19 September 1983
Saint Lucia	GRULAC	Was a crown colony, then an associated state of the United Kingdom of Great Britain and Northern Ireland during its 33 years of Security Council membership until 22 February 1979
Samoa	Asia-Pacific	Was a League of Nations mandate, then a United Nations trust territory, under the administration of New Zealand during its 2 years of Security Council membership until 1 January 1962
San Marino	WEOG	
São Tomé and Príncipe	African	
Saudi Arabia	Asia-Pacific	Saudi Arabia was elected in the 2013 election, but declined the seat.
Serbia	E. European	Was a republic of Yugoslavia during its 7 years of Security Council membership until 27 April 1992 (Note: Serbia was also a constituent state of the Federal Republic of Yugoslavia and of Serbia and Montenegro from 27 April 1992 until 5 June 2006, but these entities were not members of the Security Council.)
Seychelles	African	Was a crown colony of the United Kingdom of Great Britain and Northern Ireland during its 30 years of Security Council membership until 29 July 1976
Solomon Islands	Asia-Pacific	Was a protectorate of the United Kingdom of Great Britain and Northern Ireland during its 32 years of Security Council membership until 7 July 1978
South Sudan	African	Was a condominium of the United Kingdom of Great Britain and Northern Ireland and Egypt during its 10 years and 3 years of Security Council membership until 1 January 1956, then part of Sudan during its 2 years of Security Council membership until 9 July 2011
Suriname	GRULAC	Was a colony, then a constituent country of the Kingdom of the Netherlands during its 5 years of Security Council membership until 25 November 1975
Tajikistan	Asia-Pacific	Was a union republic of the Union of Soviet Socialist Republics during its 45 years of Security Council membership until 9 September 1991
Tonga	Asia-Pacific	Was a protected state of the United Kingdom of Great Britain and Northern Ireland during its 24 years of Security Council membership until 4 June 1970
Turkmenistan	Asia-Pacific	Was a union republic of the Union of Soviet Socialist Republics during its 46 years of Security Council membership until 27 October 1991
Tuvalu	Asia-Pacific	Was a crown colony of the United Kingdom of Great Britain and Northern Ireland during its 32 years of Security Council membership until 1 October 1978
Uzbekistan	Asia-Pacific	Was a union republic of the Union of Soviet Socialist Republics during its 45 years of Security Council membership until 31 August 1991
Vanuatu	Asia-Pacific	Was a condominium under joint sovereignty of the United Kingdom of Great Britain and Northern Ireland and France during its 34 years of Security Council membership until 30 July 1980

=== Former UN members that were never UNSC members ===
Former UN Member state	UN membership	Security Council membership as part of another entity
Serbia and Montenegro	2000 to 2006	Was part of Yugoslavia during its 7 years of Security Council membership until 27 April 1992; obtained UN membership after being denied automatic continuity from Yugoslavia
Tanganyika	1961 to 1964	Was a League of Nations mandate under the administration of the United Kingdom of Great Britain and Northern Ireland during its 1 year of Security Council membership until 11 December 1946, then a United Nations trust territory under the administration of the United Kingdom of Great Britain and Northern Ireland until 9 December 1961, then independent until federation with Zanzibar to form the United Republic of Tanzania on 26 April 1964
Zanzibar	1963 to 1964	Was a protectorate of the United Kingdom of Great Britain and Northern Ireland during its 18 years of Security Council membership until 10 December 1963, then independent until federation with Tanganyika to form the United Republic of Tanzania on 26 April 1964

== See also ==
- United Nations Regional Groups
- Member states of the United Nations
- List of members of the United Nations Economic and Social Council
- List of members of the United Nations Commission on Human Rights
