= 1984 United Nations Security Council election =

Election to the United Nations Security Council

- 22 October – 18 December 1984

5 of 10 non-permanent seats on the United Nations Security Council
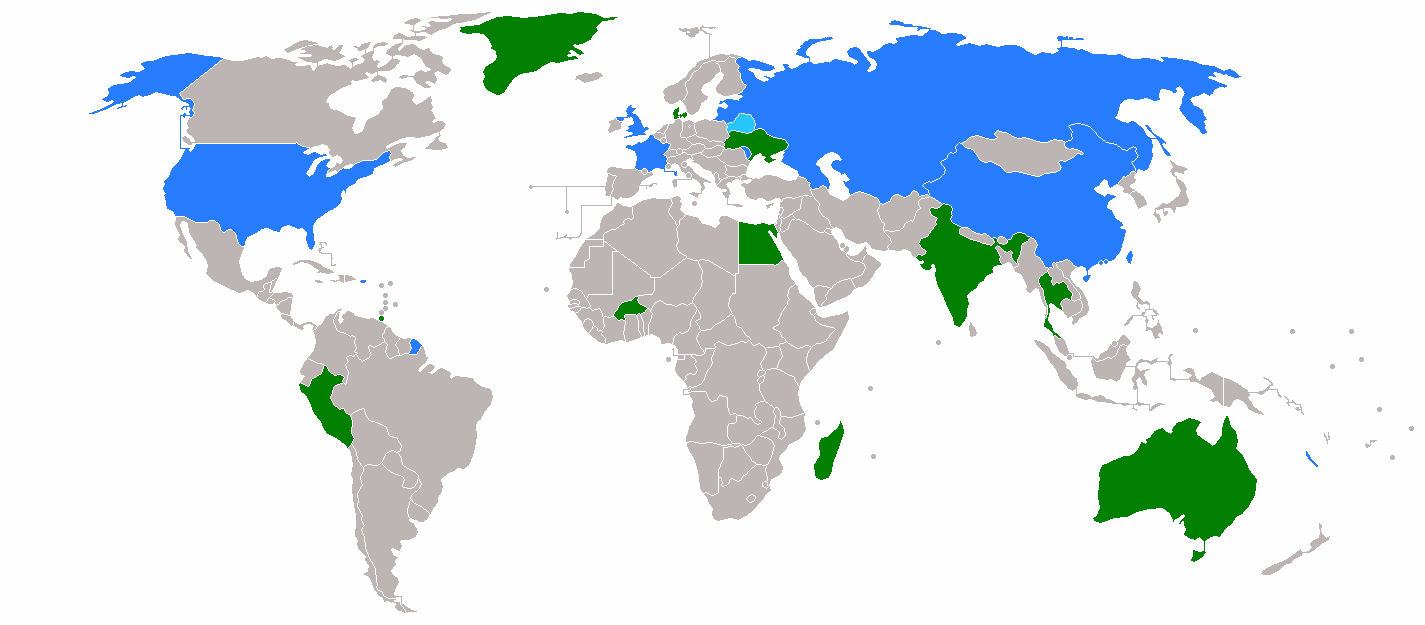
- United Nations Security Council membership after the election Permanent members Non-permanent members
- Outgoing members Zimbabwe (Africa) Pakistan (Asia) Nicaragua (GRULAC) Malta (WEOG) Netherlands (WEOG) Elected members Madagascar (Africa) Thailand (Asia) Trinidad and Tobago (GRULAC) Australia (WEOG) Denmark (WEOG)

- Unsuccessful candidates
- Ethiopia (Africa)
- Mongolia (Asia)
- Somalia (Africa)

The 1984 United Nations Security Council election was held from 22 October to 18 December 1984 during the Thirty-ninth session of the United Nations General Assembly, held at United Nations Headquarters in New York City. The General Assembly elected Australia, Denmark, Madagascar, Thailand, and Trinidad and Tobago, as the five new non-permanent members of the UN Security Council for two-year mandates commencing on 1 January 1985. Madagascar, Thailand and Trinidad and Tobago were elected to Council for the first time.

== Rules ==
The Security Council has 15 seats, filled by five permanent members and ten non-permanent members. Each year, half of the non-permanent members are elected for two-year terms. A sitting member may not immediately run for re-election.

In accordance with the rules whereby the ten non-permanent UNSC seats rotate among the various regional blocs into which UN member states traditionally divide themselves for voting and representation purposes, the five available seats are allocated as follows:

- One for African countries (held by Zimbabwe)
- One for countries from the Asian Group (now called the Asia-Pacific Group) (held by Pakistan)
- One for Latin America and the Caribbean (held by Nicaragua)
- Two for the Western European and Others Group (held by Malta and Netherlands)

To be elected, a candidate must receive a two-thirds majority of those present and voting. If the vote is inconclusive after the first round, three rounds of restricted voting shall take place, followed by three rounds of unrestricted voting, and so on, until a result has been obtained. In restricted voting, only official candidates may be voted on, while in unrestricted voting, any member of the given regional group, with the exception of current Council members, may be voted on.

== Endorsed candidates ==
Prior to the first round of balloting, the delegate of Sweden, speaking on behalf of the Western European and Others Group, endorsed Australia and Denmark. The African Group had previously endorsed Ethiopia.

Following the first round, the delegate of Ecuador thanked the Member States that had voted for his country and reiterated the fact that Ecuador had withdrawn its candidacy prior to the vote.

After receiving votes in the fifth, sixth, and seventh rounds of voting, the delegates of Kenya, Tanzania, and Cameroon underlined the fact that their countries were not candidates. Tanzania explicitly endorsed Ethiopia's candidacy.

Between the tenth and eleventh rounds of balloting, under mediation by the Organization of African Unity, Ethiopia and Somalia agreed to withdraw their candidacies in favour of Madagascar. The result of this negotiation was formally announced by the Congolese delegate, as chairman of the African Group, prior to the final round of balloting.

== Result ==
Voting was conducted on a single ballot. Ballots containing more states from a certain region than seats allocated to that region were invalidated.

=== Day 1 ===
The first four rounds of balloting were held on 22 October 1984 during the 33rd plenary meeting of the General Assembly.

Member	Round 1	Round 2	Round 3	Round 4
Australia	146	–	–	–
Denmark	145	–	–	–
Trinidad and Tobago	142	–	–	–
Thailand	99	100	103	106
Ethiopia	85	84	82	83
Somalia	70	72	74	72
Mongolia	59	54	51	49
Ecuador	6	–	–	–
Austria	6	–	–	–
Venezuela	2	–	–	–
Barbados	1	–	–	–
Dominican Republic	1	–	–	–
Finland	1	–	–	–
West Germany	1	–	–	–
Haiti	1	–	–	–
abstentions	0	1	1	2
invalid ballots	0	0	0	0
required majority	105	105	105	104

=== Day 2 ===
The fifth through tenth rounds of balloting were held on 28 November 1984 at the 77th Plenary meeting of the General Assembly.

Member	Round 5	Round 6	Round 7	Round 8	Round 9	Round 10
Ethiopia	81	77	76	79	78	75
Somalia	68	66	67	77	72	75
Tanzania	2	2	3	–	–	–
Kenya	–	2	2	–	–	–
Cameroon	–	–	1	–	–	–
abstentions	1	1	1	1	0	0
invalid ballots	0	1	0	1	2	2
required majority	101	98	100	100	100	100

=== Day 3 ===
The eleventh and final round of balloting was held on 18 December 1984 at the 105th Plenary meeting of the General Assembly.

Member	Round 11
Madagascar	126
Kenya	4
Comoros	3
Burundi	1
Mali	1
Morocco	1
abstentions	11
invalid ballots	0
required majority	91

== See also ==
- List of members of the United Nations Security Council
- Australia and the United Nations
- Trinidad and Tobago and the United Nations
