= 2002 United Nations Security Council election =

Election to the United Nations Security Council

- 27 September 2002

5 of 10 non-permanent seats on the United Nations Security Council
- United Nations Security Council membership after the election Permanent members Non-permanent members
- Outgoing members Mauritius (Africa) Singapore (Asia) Colombia (GRULAC) Ireland (WEOG) Norway (WEOG) Elected members Angola (Africa) Pakistan (Asia) Chile (GRULAC) Germany (WEOG) Spain (WEOG)

The 2002 United Nations Security Council election was held on 27 September 2002 at United Nations Headquarters in New York City during the 57th session of the United Nations General Assembly. The General Assembly elected five non-permanent members of the UN Security Council for two-year terms commencing on 1 January 2003.

The five candidates elected were Angola (for the first time), Chile, Germany, Pakistan, and Spain.

== Geographic distribution ==
In accordance with the General Assembly's rules for the geographic distribution of the non-permanent members of the Security Council, and established practice, the members were to be elected as follows: one from Africa, one from Asia, one from Latin American and the Caribbean (GRULAC), and two from Western Europe and Other States.

== Candidates ==
There was a total of five candidates for the five seats – none of the seats were contested. The candidates were: Angola for the African Group; Chile for the GRULAC region; Pakistan for the Asian Group, and Germany and Spain for the Western European and Others Group.

== Results ==
Voting proceeded by secret ballot. For each geographic group, each member state could vote for as many candidates as were to be elected. There were 183 ballots in each of the three elections.

=== African and Asian States (two to be elected) ===
- Angola 181
- Pakistan 172
- abstentions 1

=== Latin American and Caribbean States (one to be elected) ===
- Chile 178
- abstentions 5

=== Western European and Other States (two to be elected) ===
- Germany 180
- Spain 180

=== End result ===
With all the five candidates running uncontested, and each of them achieving the requisite 2/3 support, the result of the election was as follows: Angola, Chile, Germany, Pakistan, and Spain were elected to the Security Council for two-year terms beginning on 1 January 2003.

== See also ==
- List of members of the United Nations Security Council
- Germany and the United Nations
- Pakistan and the United Nations
- European Union and the United Nations
