= 2008 United Nations Security Council election =

Election to the United Nations Security Council

- 17 October 2008

5 of 10 non-permanent seats on the United Nations Security Council
- United Nations Security Council membership after the election Permanent members Non-permanent members
- Outgoing members South Africa (Africa) Indonesia (Asia) Panama (GRULAC) Belgium (WEOG) Italy (WEOG) Elected members Uganda (Africa) Japan (Asia) Mexico (GRULAC) Turkey (WEOG) Austria (WEOG)

The 2008 United Nations Security Council election was held on 17 October 2008 during the 63rd session of the United Nations General Assembly at United Nations Headquarters in New York City. The elections were held for five non-permanent seats on the UN Security Council for two-year mandates commencing on 1 January 2009.

In accordance with the Security Council's rotation rules, the ten non-permanent Security Council seats rotate among the regional blocs into which UN member states traditionally divide themselves for voting and representation purposes. All five contests were won on the first ballot. The five available seats were allocated as follows:

- One for the African Group, held by South Africa
- One for the Asian Group, held by Indonesia
- One for the Latin American and Caribbean Group, held by Panama
- Two for the Western European and Others Group, held by Belgium and Italy

The newly elected five member states served on the Security Council for the 2009–10 period.

== Elected members ==
The five elected members after the 2008 elections are:

- Uganda for Africa, replacing South Africa.
- Japan for Asia, replacing Indonesia.
- Mexico for Latin America and the Caribbean, replacing Panama.
- Turkey for the Western European and Others Group, replacing Belgium.
- Austria for the Western European and Others Group, replacing Italy.

Both Mexico and Uganda ran unopposed for their seats within their regional groups, while Japan faced competition in the Asian region from Iran, and Austria and Turkey in the Western European and Others region had opposition from Iceland.

The election of Japan as a member of the Security Council marks the nation's tenth time there, the longest tenure up until then of any nation excluding its permanent members.

== Detailed results ==
Both Iceland and Iran were contending for spots on the council. Iceland was considered an unlikely choice for the Western European and Others Group, and its recent financial crisis further hurt its chances.

Iran lost the Asia seat to Japan. Japan is the second-largest financial contributor to the UN and is thought by many to be a candidate for a permanent Security Council seat. Iran, by contrast, has had Security Council sanctions imposed on it for its nuclear program.

Voting was by secret ballot. The official UN results showed:

- 192 ballot papers were distributed in each election.
- For the two African and Asian seats the votes were: Uganda 181; Japan 158; Iran 32; Madagascar (not a candidate) 2; with one abstention.
- For the one Latin American and Caribbean seat the votes were: Mexico 185; Brazil (not a candidate) 1; and six countries abstaining.
- For the two Western European and Other seats the votes were: Turkey 151; Austria 133; Iceland 87; Australia (not a candidate) 1; with no abstentions.
- Since the winners each received more than two-thirds of the non-abstaining votes, there were no further rounds of voting.

== See also ==
- List of members of the United Nations Security Council
- Japan and the United Nations
- Mexico and the United Nations
- European Union and the United Nations
