= 1987 United Nations Security Council election =

Election to the United Nations Security Council

- 15 October 1987

5 of 10 non-permanent seats on the United Nations Security Council
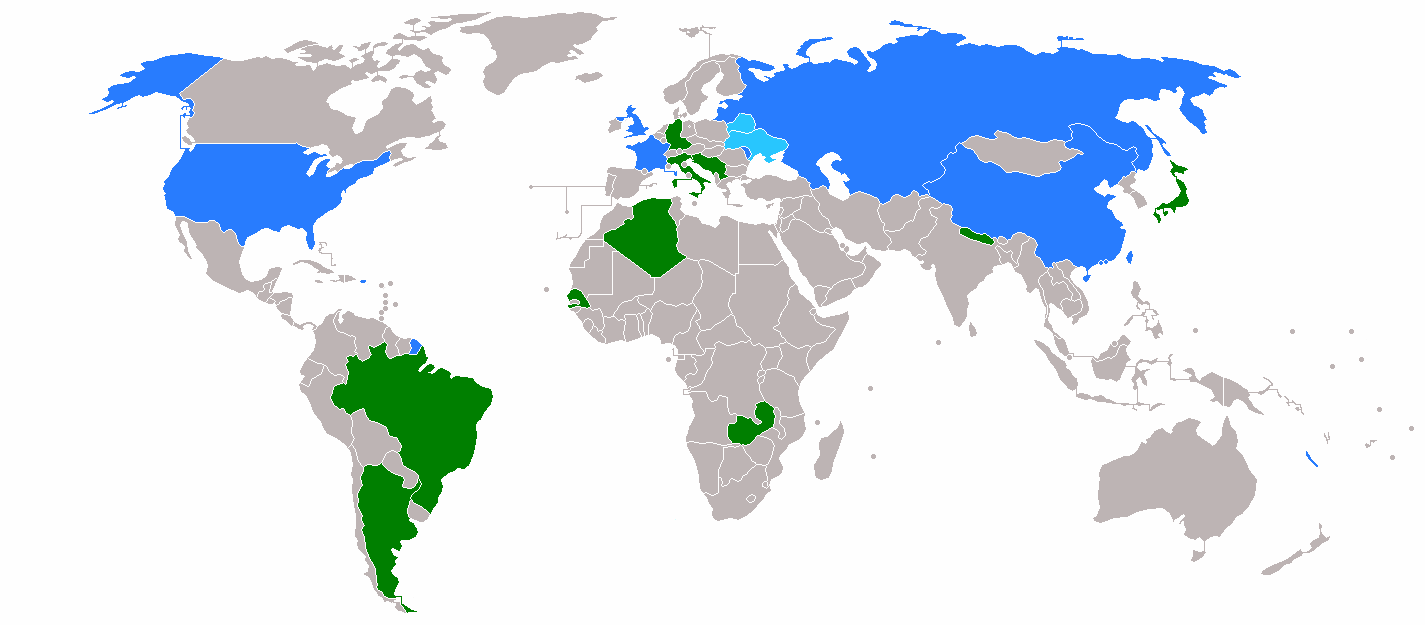
- United Nations Security Council membership after the election Permanent members Non-permanent members
- Outgoing members People's Republic of the Congo (Africa) Ghana (Africa) United Arab Emirates (Asia)^{a} Venezuela (GRULAC) Bulgaria (EEG) a. Arab state Elected members Senegal (Africa) Algeria (Africa)^{a} Nepal (Asia) Brazil (GRULAC) Yugoslavia (EEG)

- Unsuccessful candidate
- Morocco (Africa)

The 1987 United Nations Security Council election was held on 15 October 1987 during the Forty-second session of the United Nations General Assembly, held at United Nations Headquarters in New York City. The General Assembly elected Algeria, Brazil, Nepal, Senegal, and Yugoslavia, as the five new non-permanent members of the UN Security Council for two-year mandates commencing on 1 January 1988.

== Rules ==
The Security Council has 15 seats, filled by five permanent members and ten non-permanent members. Each year, half of the non-permanent members are elected for two-year terms. A sitting member may not immediately run for re-election.

In accordance with the rules whereby the ten non-permanent UNSC seats rotate among the various regional blocs into which UN member states traditionally divide themselves for voting and representation purposes, the five available seats are allocated as follows:

- Two for African countries, one of them being the "Arab Swing Seat" (held by Congo and Ghana)
- One for the Asian Group (now the Asia-Pacific Group) (held by the United Arab Emirates)
- One for Latin America and the Caribbean (held by Venezuela)
- One for the Eastern European Group (held by Bulgaria)

To be elected, a candidate must receive a two-thirds majority of those present and voting. If the vote is inconclusive after the first round, three rounds of restricted voting shall take place, followed by three rounds of unrestricted voting, and so on, until a result has been obtained. In restricted voting, only official candidates may be voted on, while in unrestricted voting, any member of the given regional group, with the exception of current Council members, may be voted on.

== Result ==
Voting was conducted on a single ballot. Ballots containing more states from a certain region than seats allocated to that region were invalidated. There was a total of 158 ballot papers.

Member	Round 1	Round 2
Brazil	151	—
Yugoslavia	146	—
Nepal	144	—
Senegal	132	—
Algeria	104	113
Morocco	61	42
Nigeria	2	—
Benin	1	—
Guyana	1	—
India	1	—
Libya	1	—
Pakistan	1	—
Romania	1	—
abstentions	0	3
invalid ballots	0	0
required majority	106	104

== See also ==
- List of members of the United Nations Security Council
- Brazil and the United Nations
