= 1966 United Nations Security Council election =

Election to the United Nations Security Council

- 11 November 1966

5 (of 10) non-permanent seats on the United Nations Security Council
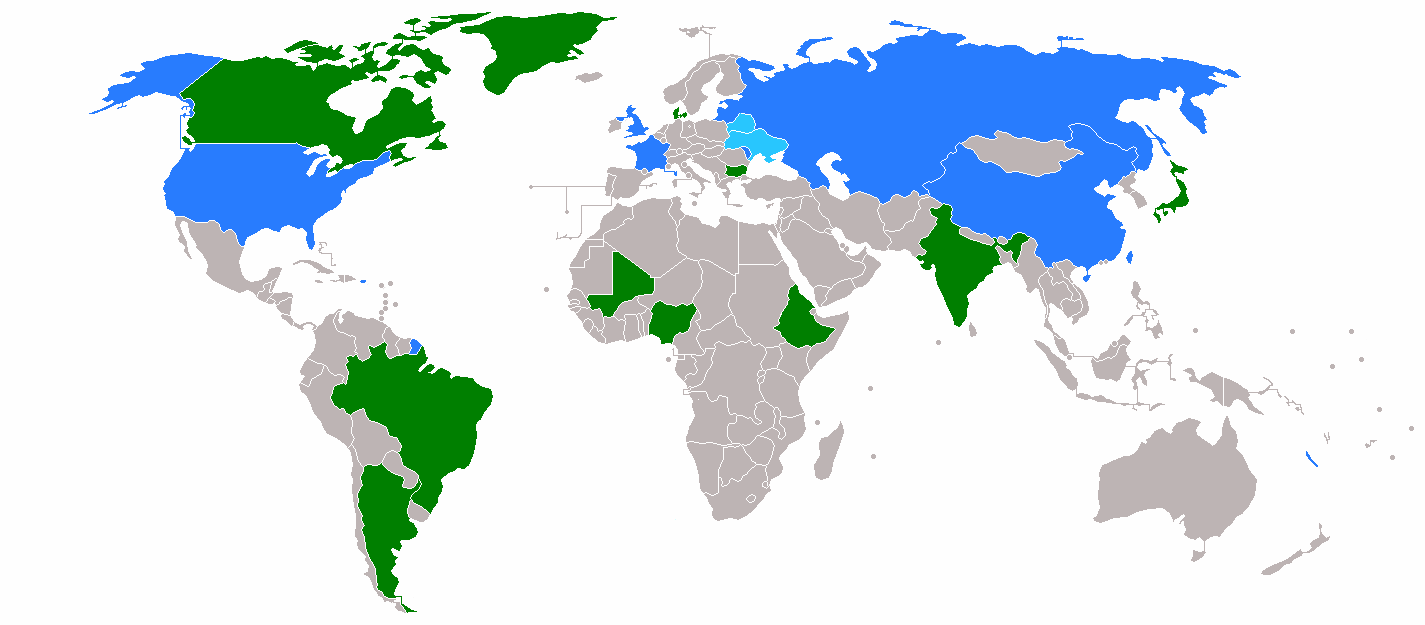
Members before election
Uganda (Africa)
Jordan (Asia)
Uruguay (LatAm&Car)
Netherlands (WEOG)
New Zealand (WEOG)
New Members
Ethiopia (Africa)
India (Asia)
Brazil (LatAm&Car)
Canada (WEOG)
Denmark (WEOG)

The 1966 United Nations Security Council election was held on 11 November 1966 during the Twenty-first session of the United Nations General Assembly, held at United Nations Headquarters in New York City. The General Assembly elected Brazil, Canada, Denmark, Ethiopia (for the first time), and India, as the five new non-permanent members of the UN Security Council for two-year mandates commencing on 1 January 1967.

== Rules ==
The Security Council has 15 seats, filled by five permanent members and ten non-permanent members. Each year, half of the non-permanent members are elected for two-year terms. A sitting member may not immediately run for re-election.

In accordance with the rules whereby the ten non-permanent UNSC seats rotate among the various regional blocs into which UN member states traditionally divide themselves for voting and representation purposes, the five available seats are allocated as follows:

- One for African countries (held by Uganda)
- One for countries from the Asian Group (now called the Asia-Pacific Group) (held by Jordan)
- One for Latin America and the Caribbean (held by Uruguay)
- Two for the Western European and Others Group (held by the Netherlands and New Zealand)

To be elected, a candidate must receive a two-thirds majority of those present and voting. If the vote is inconclusive after the first round, three rounds of restricted voting shall take place, followed by three rounds of unrestricted voting, and so on, until a result has been obtained. In restricted voting, only official candidates may be voted on, while in unrestricted voting, any member of the given regional group, with the exception of current Council members, may be voted on.

Owing to a charter amendment adding four seats to the Security Council, Uganda and New Zealand had been assigned 1-year terms at the previous election and stood down at this election.

== Result ==
At this time, the United Nations had 121 member states (for a timeline of UN membership, see Enlargement of the United Nations). There were no nominations before the election. The election was managed by then-President of the United Nations General Assembly Abdul Rahman Pazhwak of Afghanistan and one of the vice-presidents, a Mr. Solomon of Trinidad and Tobago. Voting was conducted on a single ballot. Ballots containing more states from a certain region than seats allocated to that region were invalidated.

Member	Round 1
Brazil	114
Canada	114
Ethiopia	109
Denmark	108
India	82
Syria	42
Sweden	3
Italy	1
Kenya	1
Mexico	1
Pakistan	1
Senegal	1
Somalia	1
invalid ballots	0
required majority	80
ballot papers	119

== See also ==
- List of members of the United Nations Security Council
- Brazil and the United Nations
- Canada and the United Nations
- India and the United Nations
