= 2025 United Nations Security Council election =

Election to the United Nations Security Council

- 3 June 2025

5 of 10 non-permanent seats on the United Nations Security Council
- United Nations Security Council membership after the election Permanent members Non-permanent members
- Outgoing members Sierra Leone (Africa) Algeria (Africa)^{a} South Korea (Asia–Pacific) Guyana (GRULAC) Slovenia (EEG) a. Arab state Elected members Democratic Republic of the Congo (Africa) Liberia (Africa) Bahrain (Asia–Pacific)^{a} Colombia (GRULAC) Latvia (EEG)

The 2025 United Nations Security Council election was held on 3 June 2025 during the 79th session of the United Nations General Assembly, held at United Nations Headquarters in New York City. The elections are for five non-permanent seats on the UN Security Council for two-year mandates commencing on 1 January 2026. In accordance with the Security Council's rotation rules, whereby the ten non-permanent UNSC seats rotate among the various regional blocs into which UN member states traditionally divide themselves for voting and representation purposes, the five available seats are allocated as follows:

- Two for the African Group
- One for the Asia-Pacific Group
- One for the Latin American and Caribbean Group
- One for the Eastern European Group

The five members will serve on the Security Council for the 2026–27 period.

== Candidates ==
=== African Group ===
- Democratic Republic of the Congo
- Liberia

=== Eastern European Group ===
- Latvia

Montenegro was a candidate for the Eastern European Group until it withdrew its candidacy in a letter dated 30 January 2025 addressed to the Secretary-General from the Permanent Mission of Montenegro to the United Nations.

=== Asia-Pacific Group ===
- Bahrain

=== Latin American and Caribbean Group ===
- Colombia

== Results ==
=== African and Asia-Pacific Groups ===
African and Asia-Pacific Groups election results
Member	Round 1
Bahrain	186
Democratic Republic of the Congo	183
Liberia	181
valid ballots	188
abstentions	1
present and voting	187
required majority	125

=== Eastern European Group ===
Eastern European Group election results
Member	Round 1
Latvia	178
valid ballots	188
abstentions	10
present and voting	178
required majority	119

=== Latin America and Caribbean Group ===
Latin America and Caribbean Group election results
Member	Round 1
Colombia	180
valid ballots	188
abstentions	8
present and voting	180
required majority	120

== See also ==
- List of members of the United Nations Security Council
