= 1999 United Nations Security Council election =

Election to the United Nations Security Council

- 14 October 1999

5 of 10 non-permanent seats on the United Nations Security Council
- United Nations Security Council membership after the election Permanent members Non-permanent members
- Outgoing members Gabon (Africa) Gambia (Africa) Bahrain (Asia)^{a} Brazil (GRULAC) Slovenia (EEG) a. Arab state Elected members Mali (Africa) Tunisia (Africa)^{a} Bangladesh (Asia) Jamaica (GRULAC) Ukraine (EEG)

- Unsuccessful candidate
- Slovakia (EEG)

The 1999 United Nations Security Council election was held on 14 October 1999 during the Fifty-fourth session of the United Nations General Assembly, held at United Nations Headquarters in New York City. The General Assembly elected Bangladesh, Jamaica, Mali, Tunisia, and Ukraine, as the five new non-permanent members of the UN Security Council for two-year mandates commencing on 1 January 2000. Notably, Ukraine was elected to the Council for the first time as an independent nation.

== Rules ==
The Security Council has 15 seats, filled by five permanent members and ten non-permanent members. Each year, half of the non-permanent members are elected for two-year terms. A sitting member may not immediately run for re-election.

In accordance with the rules whereby the ten non-permanent UNSC seats rotate among the various regional blocs into which UN member states traditionally divide themselves for voting and representation purposes, the five available seats are allocated as follows:

- Two for African countries (held by Gabon and the Gambia), with one of them being the "Arab swing seat"
- One for countries from the Asian Group (now the Asia-Pacific Group) (held by Bahrain)
- One for Latin America and the Caribbean (held by Brazil)
- One for the Eastern European Group (held by Slovenia)

To be elected, a candidate must receive a two-thirds majority of those present and voting. If the vote is inconclusive after the first round, three rounds of restricted voting shall take place, followed by three rounds of unrestricted voting, and so on, until a result has been obtained. In restricted voting, only official candidates may be voted on, while in unrestricted voting, any member of the given regional group, with the exception of current Council members, may be voted on.

== Candidatures ==
Prior to the vote, the President of the General Assembly, Mr. Gurirab informed the General Assembly of the candidates as follows: Bangladesh, Mali, and Tunisia from the African and Asian States as endorsed candidates, Jamaica from the Latin American and Caribbean States as the endorsed candidate, and Slovakia and Ukraine from the Eastern European States as candidates not enjoying the full endorsement of their respective regional group.

== Results ==
=== African Group ===
African and Asian States election results
Member	Round 1
Bangladesh	172
Tunisia	172
Mali	171
abstentions	0
invalid ballots	0
required majority	115
ballots distributed	172

=== Latin American and Caribbean Group ===
Latin American and Caribbean Group election results
Member	Round 1
Jamaica	171
abstentions	0
invalid ballots	1
required majority	114
ballots distributed	172

=== Eastern European Group ===
Eastern European Group election results
Member	Round 1	Round 2	Round 3	Round 4
Ukraine	92	98	113	158
Slovakia	79	72	57	3
abstentions	0	0	0	6
invalid ballots	1	1	0	1
required majority	114	114	114	108
ballots distributed	172	171	170	168

Prior to the fourth round of voting, Mr. Tomka of Slovakia rose to speak. He thanked all the delegations for their support for Slovakia's bid for Security Council membership, and then formally withdrew their candidacy, wishing Ukraine well.

== See also ==
- List of members of the United Nations Security Council
