= 1997 United Nations Security Council election =

Election to the United Nations Security Council

- 14 October 1997

5 of 10 non-permanent seats on the United Nations Security Council
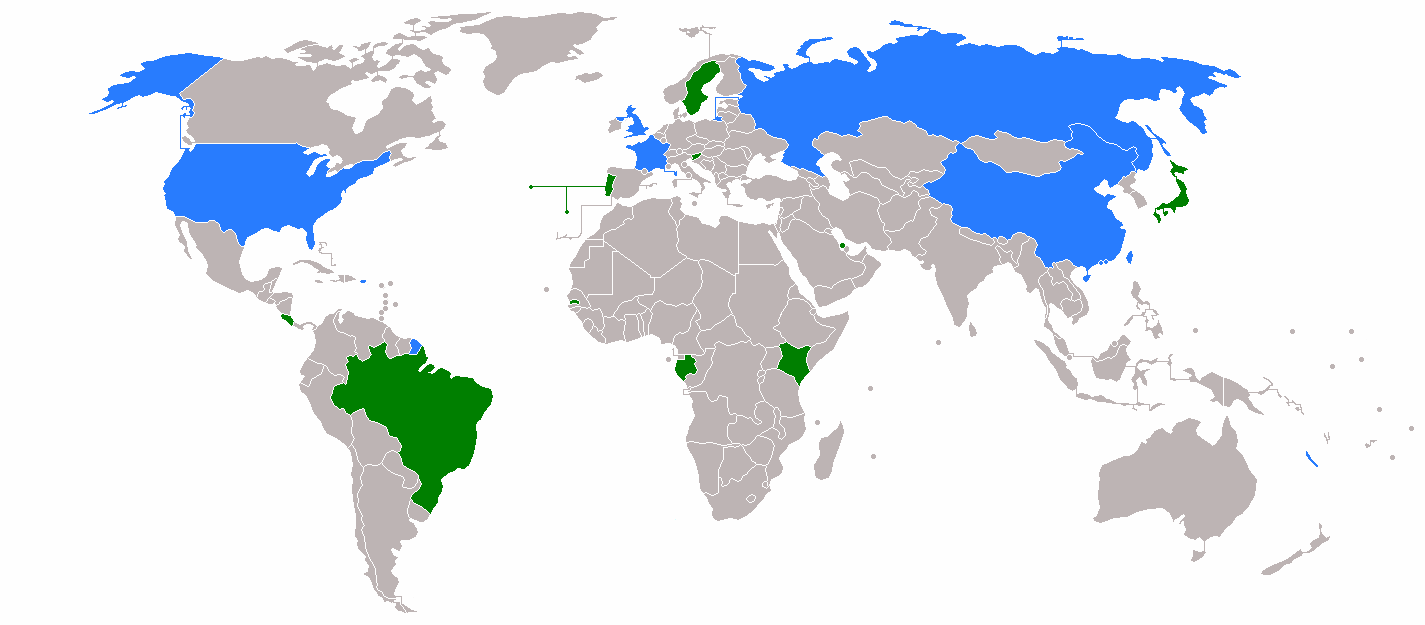
- United Nations Security Council membership after the election Permanent members Non-permanent members
- Outgoing members Guinea-Bissau (Africa) Egypt (Africa)^{a} South Korea (Asia) Chile (GRULAC) Poland (EEG) a. Arab state Elected members Gabon (Africa) Gambia (Africa) Bahrain (Asia)^{a} Brazil (GRULAC) Slovenia (EEG)

- Unsuccessful candidate
- Macedonia (EEG)

The 1997 United Nations Security Council election was held on 14 October 1997 at United Nations Headquarters in New York City during the 52nd session of the United Nations General Assembly. The General Assembly elected five non-permanent members of the UN Security Council for two-year terms commencing on 1 January 1998.

The five candidates elected were Bahrain, Brazil, Gabon, Gambia, and Slovenia with Bahrain, Gambia and Slovenia being elected for the first time.

== Geographic distribution ==
In accordance with the General Assembly's rules for the geographic distribution of the non-permanent members of the Security Council, and established practice, the members were to be elected as follows: two from Africa, one from Asia, one from Latin American and the Caribbean Group (GRULAC), and one from the Eastern European Group. By unofficial custom, the seat from Asia was to be filled by a member of the Arab League, as the previous holder of the "Arab seat" was African Egypt.

== Candidates ==
There was a total of six candidates for the five seats. The only seat contested was that of the Eastern European Group: The former Yugoslav Republic of Macedonia and Slovenia competed for the one available seat. The other groups all had a number of candidates equal to the number of seats to fill: Gabon and Gambia for the two African seats, Bahrain for the one Asian seat, and Brazil for the one GRULAC seat.

== Results ==
Voting proceeded by secret ballot. For each geographic group, each member state could vote for as many candidates as were to be elected. There were 174 ballots in each of the three elections.

=== African and Asian States ===
African and Asian States election results
Member	Round 1
Bahrain	172
Gabon	171
Gambia	169
Zambia	1
abstentions	0
invalid ballots	0
required majority	116

=== Latin American and Caribbean States ===
Latin American and Caribbean States election results
Member	Round 1
Brazil	167
Argentina	1
abstentions	6
invalid ballots	0
required majority	112

=== Eastern European Group ===
Eastern European States election results
Member	Round 1
Slovenia	140
Macedonia	30
abstentions	4
invalid ballots	0
required majority	114

With Macedonia losing to Slovenia, and all the other candidates securing their respective majority supports of 2/3, the final result was as follows: Bahrain, Brazil, Gabon, Gambia, and Slovenia were elected to serve two-year terms at the United Nations Security Council commencing 1 January 1998.

== See also ==
- List of members of the United Nations Security Council
- Brazil and the United Nations
