= 2005 United Nations Security Council election =

Election to the United Nations Security Council

- 10 October 2005

5 of 10 non-permanent seats on the United Nations Security Council
- United Nations Security Council membership after the election Permanent members Non-permanent members
- Outgoing members Benin (Africa) Algeria (Africa)^{a} Philippines (Asia) Brazil (GRULAC) Romania (EEG) a. Arab state Elected members Republic of the Congo (Africa) Ghana (Africa) Qatar (Asia)^{a} Peru (GRULAC) Slovakia (EEG)

- Unsuccessful candidate
- Nicaragua (GRULAC)

The 2005 United Nations Security Council election was held on 10 October 2005 during the 60th session of the United Nations General Assembly, held at United Nations Headquarters in New York City. The elections were for five non-permanent seats on the UN Security Council for two-year mandates commencing on 1 January 2006. The countries elected were the Republic of the Congo, Ghana, Peru, Qatar, and Slovakia with Qatar and Slovakia being elected for the first time.

== Geographic distribution ==
In accordance with the rules whereby the ten non-permanent UNSC seats rotate among the various regional blocs into which UN member states traditionally divide themselves for voting and representation purposes, the five available seats were allocated as follows:

- Two for Africa (then held by Algeria and Benin)
- One for Asia (then held by the Philippines)
- One for Eastern Europe (then held by Romania)
- One for Latin America and the Caribbean (then held by Brazil)

== Results ==
The five members (elected by a two-thirds majority of the General Assembly, in as many rounds of voting as it takes to achieve that majority) served on the Security Council for the 2006–07 period.

There were six candidates for five spots on the Council: Congo, Ghana, Nicaragua, Qatar, Peru, and Slovakia.

There was a total of 191 ballots in each of the three elections. For each geographic group, each member state could vote for as many candidates as were to be elected. Voting was done by secret ballot.

African and Asian States (three to be elected)

- Congo 188
- Ghana 184
- Qatar 186
- Indonesia 1
- abstentions 2

Eastern European States (one to be elected)

- Slovakia 185
- abstentions 6

Latin American and Caribbean States (one to be elected)

- Peru 144
- Nicaragua 43
- abstentions 4

== See also ==
- List of members of the United Nations Security Council
- European Union and the United Nations
