= 1996 United Nations Security Council election =

Election to the United Nations Security Council

- 21 October 1996

5 of 10 non-permanent seats on the United Nations Security Council
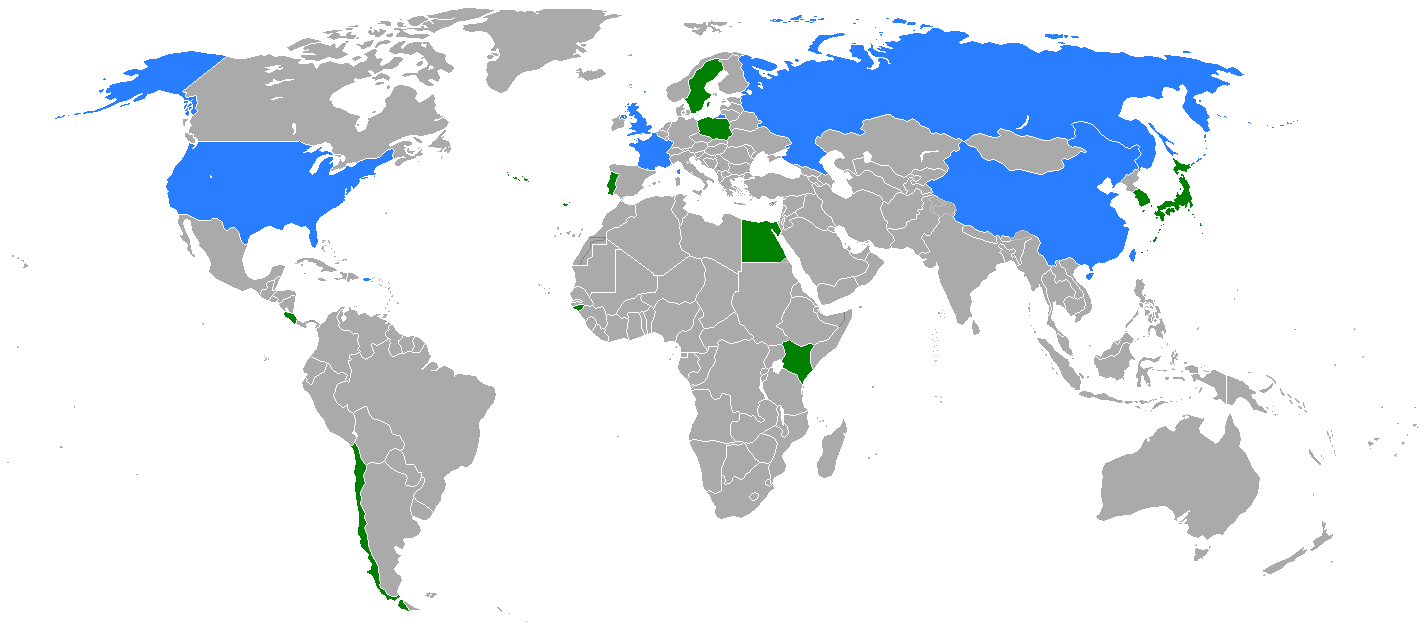
- United Nations Security Council membership after the election Permanent members Non-permanent members
- Outgoing members Botswana (Africa) Indonesia (Asia) Honduras (GRULAC) Germany (WEOG) Italy (WEOG) Elected members Kenya (Africa) Japan (Asia) Costa Rica (GRULAC) Portugal (WEOG) Sweden (WEOG)

- Unsuccessful candidates
- Australia (WEOG)
- Bolivia (GRULAC)
- India (Asia)

The 1996 United Nations Security Council election was held on 21 October 1996 at United Nations Headquarters in New York City during the 51st session of the United Nations General Assembly. The General Assembly elected five non-permanent members of the UN Security Council for two-year terms commencing on 1 January 1997.

The five candidates elected were Costa Rica, Japan, Kenya, Portugal, and Sweden.

== Geographic distribution ==
In accordance with the General Assembly's rules for the geographic distribution of the non-permanent members of the Security Council, and established practice, the members were to be elected as follows: one from Africa, one from Asia, one from Latin American and the Caribbean Group (GRULAC), and two from the Western European and Others Group (WEOG).

== Candidates ==
There was a total of eight candidates for the five seats. Only the single seat for the African Group was uncontested; the only candidate was Kenya. India and Japan both put forth their candidacies for the single seat of the Asian Group. Bolivia and Costa Rica were candidates for the single GRULAC seat. For the two seats reserved for the Western European and Others Group, there were three candidates: Australia, Portugal, and Sweden.

== Results ==
Voting proceeded by secret ballot. For each geographic group, each member state could vote for as many candidates as were to be elected. There were 181 ballots in each of the elections.

=== African and Asian States ===
African and Asian States election results
Member	Round 1
Kenya	172
Japan	142
India	40
abstentions	0
invalid ballots	1
required majority	120

=== Latin American and Caribbean States ===
Latin American and Caribbean States election results
Member	Round 1	Round 2
Costa Rica	105	167
Bolivia	73	5
Colombia	1	–
Dominican Republic	1	–
abstentions	1	9
invalid ballots	0	0
required majority	120	115

The first round of voting was inconclusive, as neither Costa Rica nor Bolivia succeeded at securing a 2/3 majority. However, Edgar Camacho-Omiste of the Bolivian delegation then said to the Assembly that his country had signed an agreement with Costa Rica by which the two countries agreed that support would be given to the delegation obtaining the larger number of votes in the first round of balloting. A second round of voting still occurred.

=== Western European and Others Group ===
Western European and Other States election results
Member	Round 1	Round 2
Sweden	153	–
Portugal	112	124
Australia	91	57
abstentions	0	0
invalid ballots	0	0
required majority	121	121

In the first round, Sweden had won its seat, but the other remaining seat was not determined yet, as neither Portugal nor Australia had secured a 2/3 majority. For this a second round of voting was held.

=== End result ===
With Kenya, Japan, and Sweden securing their respective victories in the first round of voting, and India having been defeated, a second round of voting was called for to ascertain the remaining two seats. With Bolivia stepping down from its candidacy, Costa Rica was elected with an overwhelming majority of votes. In the Western European and Others Group, Portugal won over Australia in the second round. This gave the following result: Costa Rica, Japan, Kenya, Portugal, and Sweden were elected to serve two-year terms at the United Nations Security Council commencing 1 January 1997.

== See also ==
- List of members of the United Nations Security Council
- Japan and the United Nations
- European Union and the United Nations
- Australia and the United Nations
- India and the United Nations
