= 1977 United Nations Security Council election =

Election to the United Nations Security Council

← 1976	24 October 1977	1978 →

5 (of 10) non-permanent seats on the United Nations Security Council
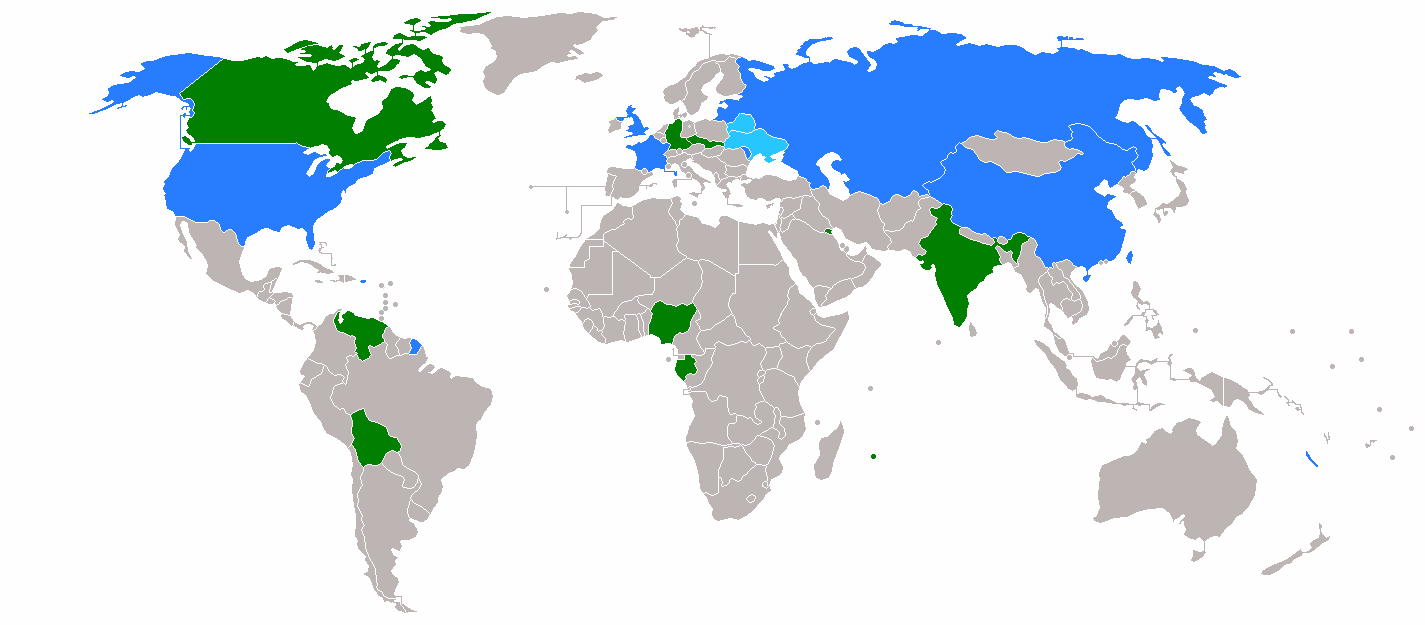
Members before election Benin (Africa); Libya (Africa, Arab) Pakistan (Asia) Panama (LatAm&Car) Romania (E. Europe)	New Members Gabon (Africa) Nigeria (Africa) Kuwait (Asia, Arab) Bolivia (LatAm&Car) Czechoslovakia (E. Europe)

- Unsuccessful candidates
- Niger (Africa)

The 1977 United Nations Security Council election was held on 24 October 1977 during the Thirty-second session of the United Nations General Assembly, held at United Nations Headquarters in New York City. The General Assembly elected Bolivia, Czechoslovakia, Gabon, Kuwait, and Nigeria, as the five new non-permanent members of the UN Security Council for two-year mandates commencing on 1 January 1978. Gabon and Kuwait were elected to the Council for the first time.

== Rules ==
The Security Council has 15 seats, filled by five permanent members and ten non-permanent members. Each year, half of the non-permanent members are elected for two-year terms. A sitting member may not immediately run for re-election.

In accordance with the rules whereby the ten non-permanent UNSC seats rotate among the various regional blocs into which UN member states traditionally divide themselves for voting and representation purposes, the five available seats are allocated as follows:

- Two for African countries (held by Benin and Libya)
- One for the Asian Group (now the Asia-Pacific Group), for the "Arab Swing Seat" (held by Pakistan)
- One for Latin America and the Caribbean (held by Panama)
- One for the Eastern European Group (held by Romania)

To be elected, a candidate must receive a two-thirds majority of those present and voting. If the vote is inconclusive after the first round, three rounds of restricted voting shall take place, followed by three rounds of unrestricted voting, and so on, until a result has been obtained. In restricted voting, only official candidates may be voted on, while in unrestricted voting, any member of the given regional group, with the exception of current Council members, may be voted on.

== Result ==
The election was managed by then-President of the United Nations General Assembly Lazar Mojsov of Yugoslavia. The United Nations had 150 member states at this time (for a timeline of UN membership, see Enlargement of the United Nations). Delegates were to write the names of the five member states they wished elected on the ballot papers. Voting was conducted by secret ballots. Ballots containing more states from a certain region than seats allocated to that region were invalidated. There were no nominations prior the vote.

In the first round of voting, Bolivia, Czechoslovakia, Gabon, and Kuwait were elected, leaving one more seat to be filled in Africa. According to rule 94 of the rules of procedure, the next three rounds of voting would be restricted to the two countries that acquired the highest number of votes in this first round, namely Niger and Nigeria. Any ballots containing the names of other countries would be considered invalid. The second round of voting was inconclusive, so a third was ordered by the President. While the vote had begun, the President called on the representative of Niger. Mr. Djermakoye of Niger made a statement that was considered ambiguous by at least one member of the Assembly: "I should like to remind the entire Assembly that Niger's candidacy is that of an African country. We note that at this stage of the elections certain principles governing the various groups of States in the Assembly as a whole have not been respected. We note also that the African candidacy seems less and less to be borne in mind by the entire Assembly. Consequently, Niger does not insist that the election continues. We should like to add, however, that it is not Niger that has been beaten but the Organisation of African Unity." After this statement, the President declared that the representative of Niger has withdrawn his candidacy. Next to speak was Mr. Richard of the United Kingdom; he suggested that the current vote be discontinued and a new round started. Then Mr. Fall of Senegal rose to speak, asking whether a vote can be legally interrupted, as two countries have already voted. The President answered affirmatively to this question and the third round was finalised. During the vote Mr. Garba of Nigeria also rose to speak, asking for clarification on the statement of Mr. Djermakoye: "Was he withdrawing his country's candidature or was he disassociating himself from the results of this present ballot?". Finally, Mr. Baroody of Saudi Arabia spoke, reminding that at such situations, on more than one occasion, one of the two contesting countries would withdraw, and there would be an understanding that this country would be elected at a later election. He also pleaded for the election not to drag on, as "That would not redound to our dignity or to our honour." Then the results of the fourth, again inconclusive round of voting were made known. Then the fifth and final round of voting was held, and Nigeria was elected. This fifth round was unrestricted - any nation could be voted for.

Member	Round 1	Round 2	Round 3	Round 4	Round 5
Czechoslovakia	131	–	–	–	–
Kuwait	130	–	–	–	–
Bolivia	115	–	–	–	–
Gabon	103	–	–	–	–
Niger	85	62	57	49	27
Nigeria	84	83	89	92	96
Jamaica	13	–	–	–	–
Cuba	3	–	–	–	2
Angola	–	–	–	–	1
Argentina	1	–	–	–	–
Iraq	1	–	–	–	–
Oman	1	–	–	–	–
Poland	1	–	–	–	–
Senegal	–	–	–	–	1
Tanzania	–	–	–	–	1
Zambia	1	–	–	–	–
abstentions	1	0	0	3	16
invalid ballots	0	1	0	0	1
required majority	96	97	98	94	86
ballot papers	145	146	146	144	145

== See also ==
- List of members of the United Nations Security Council
