= 1965 United Nations Security Council election =

Election to the United Nations Security Council

- 10–13 December 1965

7 (of 10) non-permanent seats on the United Nations Security Council
Members before election
Bolivia (LatAm&Car)
Malaysia (Asia)
Ivory Coast (Africa)
New Members
Argentina (LatAm&Car)
Bulgaria (EEG)
Japan (Asia)
Mali (Africa)
Uganda (Africa)
Nigeria (Africa)
New Zealand (WEOG)

The 1965 United Nations Security Council election was held on 10 December 1965 during the twentieth session of the United Nations General Assembly, held at United Nations Headquarters in New York City. The General Assembly elected seven members as non-permanent members of the UN Security Council, for one- or two-year terms beginning on 1 January 1966.

== Rules ==
An amendment to the United Nations Charter, adopted 17 December 1963 and ratified 31 August 1965, expanded the number of non-permanent seats on the Security Council from six to ten. Non-permanent members have a term length of two years; previous elections had three members elected per year and future elections would have five members elected per year. This year however, an unprecedented seven seats were up for election.

Prior to this election, the three members elected in odd years would consist of one from Latin America, one from the Commonwealth of Nations, and one from Eastern Europe; while the three members elected in even years would consist of a second one from Latin America, one from the Middle East, and one from Western Europe. As a result, the latter three members (Uruguay, Jordan, and the Netherlands) did not have seats up for election and would keep their seats.

To handle the increase in seats, after "lengthy consultations in the course of the past week," the President of the General Assembly adopted four special rules for this election.

First, the three outgoing seats were to be elected for new two-year terms. Due to political factors at the time, the Eastern European seat de facto included members from Asia, and the Commonwealth seat de facto included non-Commonwealth members from Africa, so the outgoing members were Bolivia, Ivory Coast, and Malaysia. The President of the General Assembly, with no objections, treated the Commonwealth seat previously held by Ivory Coast as an African seat, and the Eastern Europe/Asia seat previously held by Malaysia as an Eastern European seat (the Middle Eastern seat held by Jordan being treated as an Asian seat). Therefore, three members from Latin America, Africa, and Eastern Europe (not Asia) were to be elected this round. Due to an agreement from the previous year, the General Assembly had determined that Ivory Coast's outgoing seat would go to Mali. After a secret ballot, the three elected members were Argentina, Mali, and Bulgaria.

Second, because the Charter amendment specified that the four new seats were to consist of two 2-year terms and two temporary 1-year terms (so that future elections would choose five out of ten members), a secret ballot was held to decide how to assign term lengths to the four new members. Out of 114 voting, 59 decided that the General Assembly should choose which two of the four members would get 2-year terms, while 55 decided that the two members should be drawn randomly.

Third, the four newly created seats were to be elected. Compared to the 1946 elections, the Charter amendment had created three African seats and one Asian seat; but since the Commonwealth seat was converted to an African seat, the four new seats became two to Africa, one to Asia, and one to the Western European and Others Group. After a secret ballot, the four elected members were Nigeria, Uganda, Japan, and New Zealand.

Fourth, the General Assembly was to decide by a simple majority which two of the four members were to be given 2-year terms. After a secret ballot, the 2-year terms were given to Nigeria and Japan, leaving Uganda and New Zealand with 1-year terms that expired in time for the next election.

== Results ==
At this time, the United Nations had 117 member states (for a timeline of UN membership, see Enlargement of the United Nations). There were no nominations before the election. The election was managed by then-President of the United Nations General Assembly Amintore Fanfani of Italy and a Mr. Wyzner of Poland and a Mr. Montero of Uruguay.

Member	Round 1
Argentina	113
Bulgaria	108
Mali	105
invalid ballots	0
required majority	77
ballot papers	115

Member	Round 1
Nigeria	107
Uganda	102
New Zealand	101
Japan	98
Mauritania	4
Somalia	3
Ceylon	1
Ethiopia	1
Guinea	1
Liberia	1
Madagascar	1
Pakistan	1
Spain	1
Syria	1
Thailand	1
Tanzania	1
invalid ballots	0
required majority	77
ballot papers	115

=== Results for term length vote ===
Member	Round 1	Round 2	Round 3
Nigeria	77	—	—
Japan	56	52	57
New Zealand	49	36	39
Uganda	38	21	16
invalid ballots	0	2	0
abstentions	0	0	1
required majority	58	55	57
ballot papers	115	111	113

On the first round, Nigeria was chosen to hold a two-year term, but no other members met the required simple majority in either the first or second rounds. Due to time constraints, the third round took place on Monday, 13 December 1965 instead of Friday, 10 December 1965.

== See also ==
- List of members of the United Nations Security Council
