= 2022 United Nations Security Council election =

Election to the United Nations Security Council

- 9 June 2022

5 of 10 non-permanent seats on the United Nations Security Council
- United Nations Security Council membership after the election Permanent members Non-permanent members
- Outgoing members Kenya (Africa) India (Asia–Pacific) Mexico (GRULAC) Ireland (WEOG) Norway (WEOG) Elected members Mozambique (Africa) Japan (Asia–Pacific) Ecuador (GRULAC) Malta (WEOG) Switzerland (WEOG)

The 2022 United Nations Security Council election was held on 9 June 2022 during the 76th session of the United Nations General Assembly, held at United Nations Headquarters in New York City. The elections are for five non-permanent seats on the UN Security Council for two-year mandates commencing on 1 January 2023. In accordance with the Security Council's rotation rules, whereby the ten non-permanent UNSC seats rotate among the various regional blocs into which UN member states traditionally divide themselves for voting and representation purposes, the five available seats are allocated as follows:

- One for the African Group
- One for the Asia-Pacific Group
- One for the Latin American and Caribbean Group
- Two for the Western European and Others Group

The five members served on the Security Council for the 2023–24 period.

== Candidates ==
=== African Group ===
- Mozambique

=== Asia-Pacific Group ===
- Japan
- Mongolia

=== Latin American and Caribbean Group ===
- Ecuador

=== Western European and Others Group ===
- Switzerland: Switzerland released a website dedicated to the final phase of its candidature on 30 October 2020
- Malta

== Result ==
=== African and Asia-Pacific Groups ===
African and Asia-Pacific Groups election results
Member	Round 1
Mozambique	192
Japan	184
Mongolia	3
valid ballots	192
abstentions	0
present and voting	192
required majority	128

=== Latin American and Caribbean Group ===
Latin American and Caribbean Group election results
Member	Round 1
Ecuador	190
valid ballots	192
abstentions	2
present and voting	190
required majority	127

=== Western European and Others Group ===
Western European and Others Group election results
Member	Round 1
Switzerland	187
Malta	185
valid ballots	192
abstentions	2
present and voting	190
required majority	127

2023 marked the first time that Mozambique and Switzerland ever held a Security Council seat.

== See also ==
- List of members of the United Nations Security Council
