= 2009 United Nations Security Council election =

Election to the United Nations Security Council

- 15 October 2009

5 of 10 non-permanent seats on the United Nations Security Council
- United Nations Security Council membership after the election Permanent members Non-permanent members
- Outgoing members Burkina Faso (Africa) Libya (Africa)^{a} Vietnam (Asia) Costa Rica (GRULAC) Croatia (EEG) a. Arab state Elected members Gabon (Africa) Nigeria (Africa) Lebanon (Asia)^{a} Brazil (GRULAC) Bosnia and Herzegovina (EEG)

The 2009 United Nations Security Council election was held on 15 October 2009 during the 64th session of the United Nations General Assembly at United Nations Headquarters in New York City. The election was for five non-permanent seats on the UN Security Council to serve two-year mandates commencing on 1 January 2010.

In accordance with the Security Council's rotation rules, whereby the ten non-permanent UNSC seats rotate among the various regional blocs into which UN member states traditionally divide themselves for voting and representation purposes, the five available seats were allocated as follows:

- Two for the African Group (previously held by Burkina Faso and Libya)
- One for the Asian Group (previously held by Vietnam)
- One for the Latin American and Caribbean Group (previously held by Costa Rica)
- One for the Eastern European Group (previously held by Croatia)

Nigeria was expected to run unopposed but unexpectedly faced competition from Sierra Leone. Nigeria had already served thrice in the UNSC, while Sierra Leone had served only once. In the end, Sierra Leone did not contest the seat, however. Gabon ran for the second seat.

Bosnia and Herzegovina was the only candidate country for the Eastern European group seat, as Poland withdrew its candidacy in order to give strong support to the new Bosnian statehood. Poland gave its support to Bosnia and Herzegovina and invited "all the countries which have already given their support to Polish candidacy, to back-up Bosnia and Herzegovina becoming a member of the UN Security Council." Serbia announced its plans to run for the Eastern Europe seat.

As Libya's term was ending, the new Arab representative would come from the Asian Group. One of the eleven Arab League member states in Asia would therefore succeed to Vietnam's seat in this election. Lebanon announced its intention to obtain this seat.

Brazil sought to replace Costa Rica.

This year, Bosnia and Herzegovina was elected to the Council for the first time.

== Result ==
=== African and Asian Groups ===
African and Asian Groups election results
Member	Round 1
Nigeria	186
Gabon	184
Lebanon	180
Togo	1
Sierra Leone	1
Iran	1
Liberia	1
valid ballots	190
abstentions	0
present and voting	190
required majority	127

=== Latin American and Caribbean Group ===
Latin American and Caribbean Group election results
Member	Round 1
Brazil	182
Venezuela	1
valid ballots	190
abstentions	7
present and voting	183
required majority	122

=== Eastern European Group ===
Eastern European Group election results
Member	Round 1
Bosnia and Herzegovina	183
valid ballots	190
abstentions	7
present and voting	183
required majority	122

== See also ==
- List of members of the United Nations Security Council
- Brazil and the United Nations
- List of United Nations resolutions relating to Lebanon
