= 1978 United Nations Security Council election =

Election to the United Nations Security Council

← 1977	10 November 1978	1979 →

5 (of 10) non-permanent seats on the United Nations Security Council
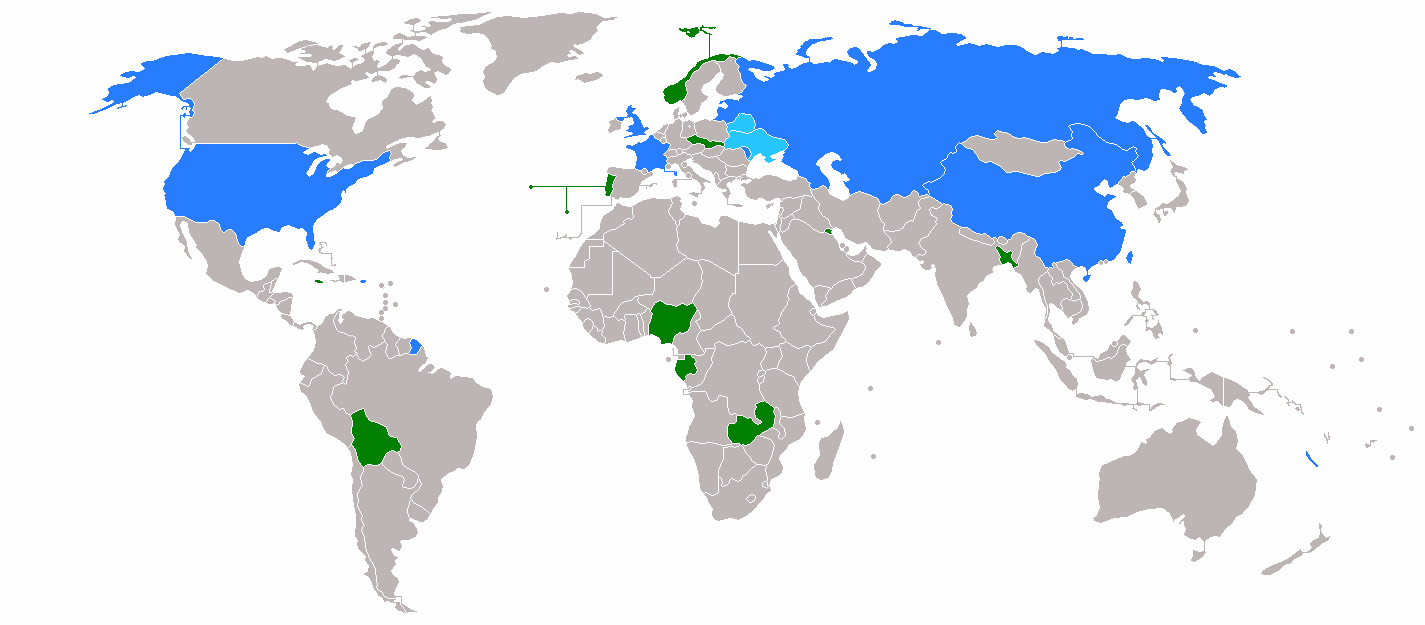
Members before election
Mauritius (Africa)
India (Asia)
Venezuela (LatAm&Car)
Canada (WEOG)
West Germany (WEOG)
New Members
Zambia (Africa)
Bangladesh (Asia)
Jamaica (LatAm&Car)
Norway (WEOG)
Portugal (WEOG)

- Unsuccessful candidates
- Japan (Asian Group)
- Malta (WEOG)

The 1978 United Nations Security Council election was held on 10 November 1978 during the Thirty-third session of the United Nations General Assembly, held at United Nations Headquarters in New York City. The General Assembly elected Bangladesh, Jamaica, Norway, Portugal, and Zambia, as the five new non-permanent members of the UN Security Council for two-year mandates commencing on 1 January 1979. Notably, Bangladesh, Jamaica and Portugal were elected members of the council for the first time.

== Rules ==
The Security Council has 15 seats, filled by five permanent members and ten non-permanent members. Each year, half of the non-permanent members are elected for two-year terms. A sitting member may not immediately run for re-election.

In accordance with the rules whereby the ten non-permanent UNSC seats rotate among the various regional blocs into which UN member states traditionally divide themselves for voting and representation purposes, the five available seats are allocated as follows:

- One for African countries (held by Mauritius)
- One for countries from the Asian Group (now called the Asia-Pacific Group) (held by India)
- One for Latin America and the Caribbean (held by Venezuela)
- Two for the Western European and Others Group (held by Canada and West Germany)

To be elected, a candidate must receive a two-thirds majority of those present and voting. If the vote is inconclusive after the first round, three rounds of restricted voting shall take place, followed by three rounds of unrestricted voting, and so on, until a result has been obtained. In restricted voting, only official candidates may be voted on, while in unrestricted voting, any member of the given regional group, with the exception of current Council members, may be voted on.

=== Candidates ===
Prior to the election, Mr. Francis of New Zealand, in his capacity as chairman for the month of the Western European and Others Group, informed the General Assembly that there were three candidates from the group to the two vacancies, namely Malta, Norway, and Portugal. Next, Mr. Albornoz of Ecuador spoke for the Latin American Group and named Jamaica as the group's endorsed and single candidate.

== Result ==
The election was managed by then-President of the United Nations General Assembly Indalecio Liévano of Colombia. The United Nations had 151 member states at this time (for a timeline of UN membership, see Enlargement of the United Nations). Voting was conducted on single ballots. Ballots containing more states from a certain region than seats allocated to that region were invalidated.

In the first round of voting, Jamaica, Norway, and Zambia were elected, but the results for the Asian and Western European groups were inconclusive. In the second round, voting was restricted to the two most successful candidates of each group, namely Bangladesh and Japan for Asia, and Malta and Portugal for Western Europe, respectively. This second round of voting was also inconclusive, and the meeting rose.

Later the same day, on the 51st plenary meeting, prior to the third round of voting, Mr. Abe of Japan rose to speak and withdrew Japan's candidature, also stating that "the Government of Japan hopes to serve on the Security Council when there is an appropriate opportunity in the future". Hence Bangladesh was elected in the third round (second restricted), while the results for Western Europe remained inconclusive. Mr. Huq of Bangladesh rose to speak to thank the member states on the election and Japan on their withdrawal. The fourth round (third restricted) was also inconclusive. In the fifth round (unrestricted), Portugal was elected, and the election was concluded.

Member	Round 1	Round 2	Round 3	Round 4	Round 5
Jamaica	145	—	—	—	—
Zambia	144	—	—	—	—
Norway	118	—	—	—	—
Bangladesh	84	87	125	—	—
Portugal	84	77	81	93	99
Malta	81	70	59	51	45
Japan	65	61	2	—	—
Comoros	1	—	—	—	—
Peru	1	—	—	—	—
abstentions	0	0	1	1	2
invalid ballots	0	0	0	0	0
required majority	100	100	94	96	96
ballot papers	149	149	142	145	146

== See also ==
- List of members of the United Nations Security Council
- Japan and the United Nations
