= 1990 United Nations Security Council election =

Election to the United Nations Security Council

- 1 November 1990

5 of 10 non-permanent seats on the United Nations Security Council
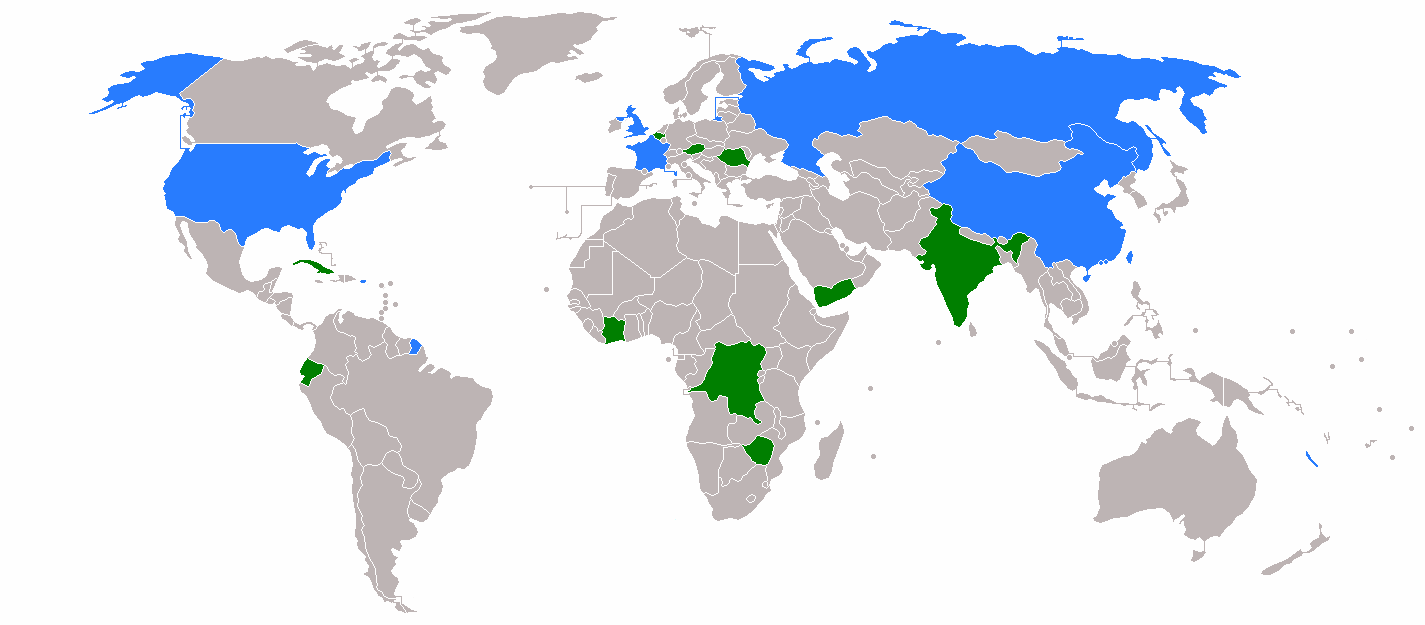
- United Nations Security Council membership after the election Permanent members Non-permanent members
- Outgoing members Ethiopia (Africa) Malaysia (Asia) Colombia (GRULAC) Canada (WEOG) Finland (WEOG) Elected members Zimbabwe (Africa) India (Asia) Ecuador (GRULAC) Austria (WEOG) Belgium (WEOG)

The 1990 United Nations Security Council election was held on 1 November 1990 during the Forty-fifth session of the United Nations General Assembly, held at United Nations Headquarters in New York City. The General Assembly elected Austria, Belgium, Ecuador, India, and Zimbabwe, as the five new non-permanent members of the UN Security Council for two-year mandates commencing on 1 January 1991.

== Rules ==
The United Nations Security Council consists of 15 members: five permanent members and ten non-permanent members. Each year, five non-permanent members are elected to serve two-year terms, ensuring that half of the non-permanent seats are renewed annually. A sitting member may not immediately run for re-election.

In accordance with the rules whereby the ten non-permanent UNSC seats rotate among the various regional blocs into which UN member states traditionally divide themselves for voting and representation purposes, the five available seats are allocated as follows:

- One for African countries (held by Ethiopia)
- One for countries from the Asian Group (now called the Asia-Pacific Group) (held by Malaysia)
- One for Latin America and the Caribbean (held by Brazil)
- Two for the Western European and Others Group (held by Canada and Finland)

To be elected to the United Nations Security Council, a candidate must receive a two-thirds majority of members present and voting. If no candidate achieves the required majority in the first round, the process alternates between rounds of restricted and unrestricted voting until a result is reached.In restricted voting, only official candidates may be voted on. In unrestricted voting, any member of the relevant regional group, excluding current Council members, may be considered. The cycle continues with three rounds of restricted voting followed by three rounds of unrestricted voting, repeating as necessary until a candidate is elected.

== Result ==
Voting was conducted on a single ballot. Ballots containing more states from a certain region than seats allocated to that region were invalidated. There was a total of 154 ballot papers.

| Member | Round 1 |
| Austria | 150 |
| Ecuador | 149 |
| Zimbabwe | 146 |
| Belgium | 142 |
| India | 141 |
| Sri Lanka | 2 |
| Australia | 1 |
| Spain | 1 |
| Hungary | 1^{*} |
| Iran | 1 |
| Japan | 1 |
| Liechtenstein | 1 |
| Mexico | 1 |
| Peru | 1 |
| Tanzania | 1 |
| Sweden | 1 |
| Venezuela | 1 |
| Yugoslavia | 1^{*} |
| abstentions | 0 |
| invalid ballots | 0 |
| required majority | 103 |

- Note *: The President had stated before the balloting began that votes for States outside the relevant region would not be counted, consequently, the votes for this Eastern European State should not have been included in the results.

== See also ==
- List of members of the United Nations Security Council
- India and the United Nations
