= 2004 United Nations Security Council election =

Election to the United Nations Security Council

- 15 October 2004

5 of 10 non-permanent seats on the United Nations Security Council
- United Nations Security Council membership after the election Permanent members Non-permanent members
- Outgoing members Angola (Africa) Pakistan (Asia) Chile (GRULAC) Germany (WEOG) Spain (WEOG) Elected members Tanzania (Africa) Japan (Asia) Argentina (GRULAC) Denmark (WEOG) Greece (WEOG)

The 2004 United Nations Security Council election was held on 15 October 2004 at United Nations Headquarters in New York City during the 59th session of the United Nations General Assembly. The General Assembly elected five non-permanent members of the UN Security Council for two-year terms commencing on 1 January 2005.

The five candidate nations elected were Argentina, Denmark, Greece, Japan, and Tanzania.

== Geographic distribution ==
In accordance with the General Assembly's rules for the geographic distribution of the non-permanent members of the Security Council, and established practice, the members were to be elected as follows: one from Africa, one from Asia, one from Latin American and the Caribbean, and two from Western Europe and Other States.

== Candidates ==
Before voting, the representative from Eritrea took the floor to formally withdraw his country's candidacy. The country has never been elected to the UN Security Council. Consequently, to Eritrea's withdrawal, all the available seats would be elected without any serious contest. The five declared candidates therefore easily obtained the required 2/3 majority in the General Assembly.

== Results ==
Voting proceeded by secret ballot. For each geographic group, each member state could vote for as many candidates as were to be elected. There were 189 ballots in each of the three elections.

=== Group A — African and Asian States (two to be elected) ===
- United Republic of Tanzania 186
- Japan 184
- Bhutan 1

=== Group B — Latin American and Caribbean States (one to be elected) ===
- Argentina 188
- abstentions 1

=== Group C — Western European and Other States (two to be elected) ===
- Greece 187
- Denmark 181

== See also ==
- List of members of the United Nations Security Council
- Japan and the United Nations
- European Union and the United Nations
