= 1991 United Nations Security Council election =

Election to the United Nations Security Council

- 16 October 1991

5 of 10 non-permanent seats on the United Nations Security Council
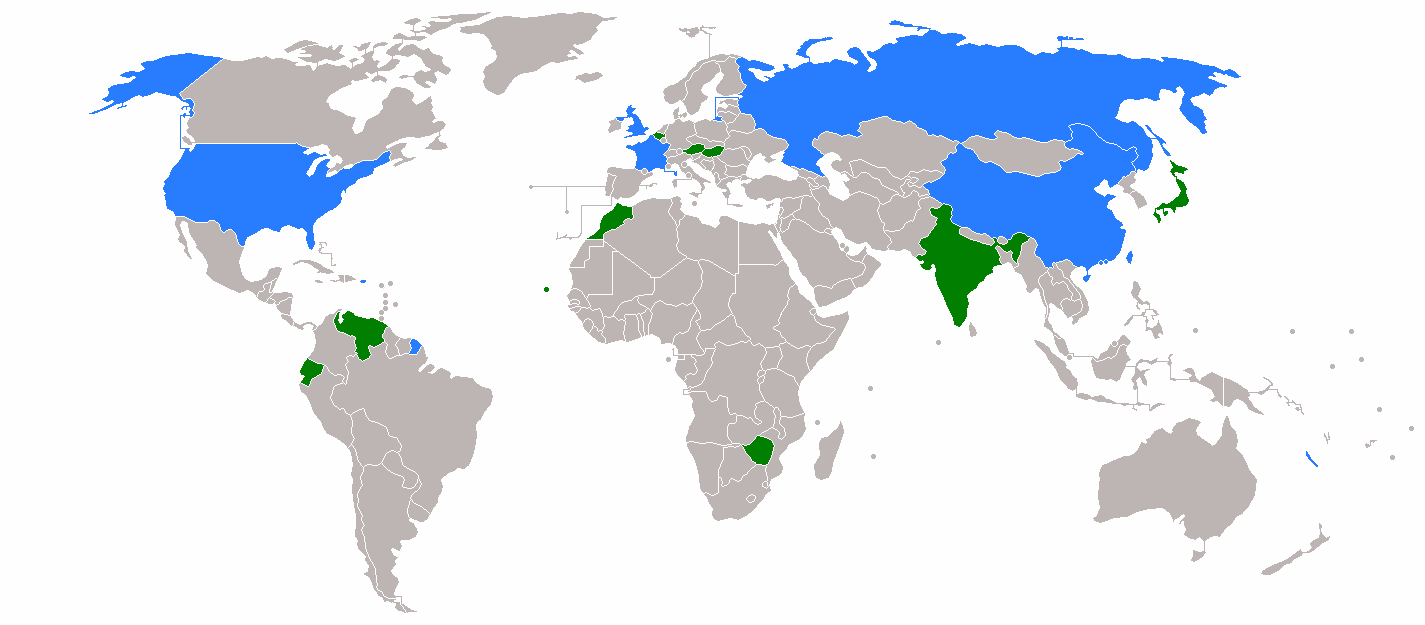
- United Nations Security Council membership after the election Permanent members Non-permanent members
- Outgoing members Ivory Coast (Africa) Zaire (Africa) Yemen (Asia)^{a} Cuba (GRULAC) Romania (EEG) a. Arab state Elected members Cape Verde (Africa) Morocco (Africa)^{a} Japan (Asia) Venezuela (GRULAC) Hungary (EEG)

The 1991 United Nations Security Council election was held on 16 October 1991 during the Forty-sixth session of the United Nations General Assembly, held at United Nations Headquarters in New York City. The General Assembly elected Cape Verde (for the first time), Hungary, Japan, Morocco, and Venezuela, as the five new non-permanent members of the UN Security Council for two-year mandates commencing on 1 January 1992.

== Rules ==
The Security Council has 15 seats, filled by five permanent members and ten non-permanent members. Each year, half of the non-permanent members are elected for two-year terms. A sitting member may not immediately run for re-election.

In accordance with the rules whereby the ten non-permanent UNSC seats rotate among the various regional blocs into which UN member states traditionally divide themselves for voting and representation purposes, the five available seats are allocated as follows:

- Two for African countries, one of them being the "Arab Swing Seat" (held by Côte d'Ivoire and the Zaire)
- One for the Asian Group (now the Asia-Pacific Group) (held by Yemen)
- One for Latin America and the Caribbean (held by Cuba)
- One for the Eastern European Group (held by Romania)

To be elected, a candidate must receive a two-thirds majority of those present and voting. If the vote is inconclusive after the first round, three rounds of restricted voting shall take place, followed by three rounds of unrestricted voting, and so on, until a result has been obtained. In restricted voting, only official candidates may be voted on, while in unrestricted voting, any member of the given regional group, with the exception of current Council members, may be voted on.

== Endorsed candidates ==
Prior to the actual vote at the General Assembly, the Chairmen of the respective regional groups told the Assembly what countries enjoyed the endorsement of their respective regions. Mr. Flores Bermudez, the Permanent Representative of Honduras to the United Nations, had verified the endorsement of Venezuela for the Latin American and Caribbean Group. Mr. Goshu of Ethiopia verified the candidacies of both Cape Verde and Morocco as endorsed candidates for the African Group. Mr. Hatano of Japan verified the candidacy of Japan as the endorsed candidate for the Asian Group. Mr. Podtserob of the Soviet Union verified the support of the Eastern European Group for the candidacy of Hungary.

== Result ==
Voting was conducted on a single ballot. Ballots containing more states from a certain region than seats allocated to that region were invalidated. There was a total of 161 ballot papers.

Member	Round 1
Cape Verde	158
Japan	158
Venezuela	154
Hungary	149
Morocco	148
Nigeria	2
Argentina	1
Honduras	1
Tunisia	1
Yugoslavia	1
abstentions	0
invalid ballots	0
required majority	108

== See also ==
- List of members of the United Nations Security Council
- Japan and the United Nations
