= 1980 United Nations Security Council election =

Election to the United Nations Security Council

- 20 October – 13 November 1980

5 (of 10) non-permanent seats on the United Nations Security Council
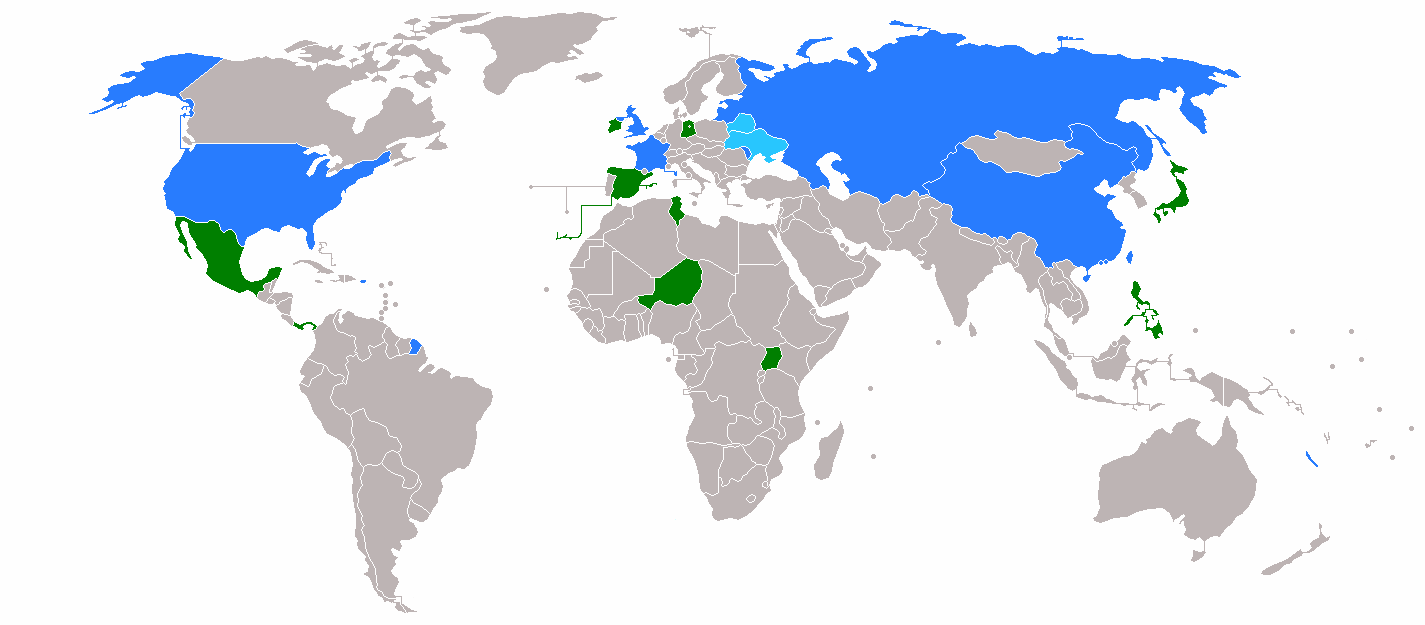
Members before election
- Zambia (Africa)
- Bangladesh (Asia)
- Jamaica (LatAm&Car)
- Norway (WEOG)
- Portugal (WEOG)
New Members
- Uganda (Africa)
- Japan (Asia)
- Panama (LatAm&Car)
- Ireland (WEOG)
- Spain (WEOG)

- Unsuccessful candidates
- Costa Rica (GRULAC)
- Cuba (GRULAC)
- Malta (WEOG)

The 1980 United Nations Security Council election was held from 20 October to 13 November 1980 during the Thirty-seventh session of the United Nations General Assembly, held at United Nations Headquarters in New York City. The General Assembly elected Ireland, Japan, Panama, Spain, and Uganda, as the five new non-permanent members of the UN Security Council for two-year mandates commencing on 1 January 1981.

== Rules ==
The Security Council has 15 seats, filled by five permanent members and ten non-permanent members. Each year, half of the non-permanent members are elected for two-year terms. A sitting member may not immediately run for re-election.

In accordance with the rules whereby the ten non-permanent UNSC seats rotate among the various regional blocs into which UN member states traditionally divide themselves for voting and representation purposes, the five available seats are allocated as follows:

- One for African countries (held by Zambia)
- One for countries from the Asian Group (now called the Asia-Pacific Group) (held by Bangladesh)
- One for Latin America and the Caribbean (held by Jamaica)
- Two for the Western European and Others Group (held by Norway and Portugal)

To be elected, a candidate must receive a two-thirds majority of those present and voting. If the vote is inconclusive after the first round, three rounds of restricted voting shall take place, followed by three rounds of unrestricted voting, and so on, until a result has been obtained. In restricted voting, only official candidates may be voted on, while in unrestricted voting, any member of the given regional group, with the exception of current Council members, may be voted on.

== Candidates ==
=== Africa and Asia ===
- Japan
- Uganda

=== Western Europe and Others ===
The candidates for the Western European and Others Group were announced by its chairman, the delegate for New Zealand, prior to the first round of voting.

- Ireland
- Malta
- Spain

=== Latin America and the Caribbean ===
- Costa Rica – Costa Rica was one of only two countries to declare its intention to seek the one Latin American seat prior to the election. It formally withdrew after the twenty-second round.
- Cuba – Cuba was the other country that declared its candidacy prior to the election. However, before the first round of voting, Cuba withdrew, citing conditions similar to the previous year's election, in which Cuba had been an unsuccessful candidate and which had lasted 155 rounds over three months.
- Panama – Panama only declared its candidacy after fourteen rounds of inconclusive voting were already complete, having initially endorsed Costa Rica, citing the election of Ronald Reagan as a compelling reason for Panama's presence on the council.

Non-candidates

- Guyana – Having received a significant number of votes in the first few rounds, Guyana clarified that it was not a seeking a seat on the council and formally endorsed Costa Rica.
- Nicaragua – Although receiving a significant number of votes in the middle rounds, the Nicaraguan government decided not to be a candidate in the election. It clarified this position during an extraordinary session of the Latin American Group, and the decision was communicated to the General Assembly through the group's chairman prior to the eleventh round of voting.

== Result ==
Voting was conducted on separate ballots for the three regional groups.

=== African and Asian States ===
African and Asian States election results
Member	Round 1
Japan	141
Uganda	134
Zimbabwe	2
Senegal	1
Chad	1
abstentions	3
invalid ballots	0
required majority	98

=== Western European and Others Group ===
Western European and Others Group election results
Member	Round 1
Spain	109
Ireland	107
Malta	74
invalid ballots	0
abstentions	2
required majority	100

=== Latin American and Caribbean Group ===
The election of one Latin American or Caribbean state took several days to resolve.

==== Day 1 ====
The first three rounds of voting took place during the 41st and 42nd plenary meetings of the General Assembly.

Latin American and Caribbean Group election results
Member	Round 1	Round 2	Round 3
Costa Rica	89	78	74
Guyana	26	63	70
Cuba	9	—	—
Nicaragua	6	—	—
Panama	2	—	—
Grenada	1	—	—
Peru	1	—	—
Trinidad and Tobago	1	—	—
abstentions	15	1	1
invalid ballots	1	0	0
required majority	90	94	96

==== Day 2 ====
The fourth through eighth rounds of voting were held during the 43rd plenary meeting of the General Assembly.

Latin American and Caribbean Group election results
Member	Round 4	Round 5	Round 6	Round 7	Round 8
Costa Rica	90	84	87	86	86
Guyana	47	36	25	19	—
Nicaragua	—	22	30	40	60
Cuba	—	4	2	1	—
Dominican Republic	—	—	2	3	—
Barbados	—	1	—	—	—
Chile	—	1	—	—	—
Peru	—	1	1	—	—
Panama	—	—	1	—	—
abstentions	6	1	2	2	5
invalid ballots	8	1	1	0	0
required majority	92	100	99	100	98

==== Day 3 ====
The ninth and tenth rounds of voting were held during the 47th plenary meeting of the General Assembly.

Latin American and Caribbean Group election results
Member	Round 9	Round 10
Costa Rica	81	82
Nicaragua	62	60
abstentions	5	5
invalid ballots	0	0
required majority	96	95

==== Day 4 ====
The eleventh through thirteenth rounds of voting were held during the 51st plenary session.

Latin American and Caribbean Group election results
Member	Round 11	Round 12	Round 13	Round 14
Costa Rica	82	84	83	85
Panama	16	38	25	57
Guyana	12	8	18	–
Nicaragua	10	7	10	–
Saint Lucia	4	–	–	–
Brazil	3	2	4	–
Cuba	2	1	2	–
Barbados	1	–	–	–
Grenada	1	–	–	–
Peru	1	–	–	–
Guatemala	–	1	–	–
Haiti	–	1	–	–
abstentions	3	1	1	2
invalid ballots	0	0	0	0
required majority	88	95	95	95

==== Day 5 ====
The fifteenth through twenty-second rounds of voting were held during the 57th plenary meeting of the General Assembly.

Latin American and Caribbean Group election results
Member	Round 15	Round 16	Round 17	Round 18	Round 19	Round 20	Round 21	Round 22
Costa Rica	75	71	62	62	59	58	53	52
Panama	73	75	79	83	85	88	91	93
Guyana	–	–	3	1	–	–	–	–
Barbados	–	–	1	1	1	–	–	–
Cuba	–	–	1	–	–	–	–	–
Ecuador	–	–	1	1	1	–	–	–
Nicaragua	–	–	1	–	–	–	–	–
Trinidad and Tobago	–	–	1	–	–	–	–	–
abstentions	1	1	1	1	1	1	2	2
invalid ballots	1	0	0	0	0	0	0	0
required majority	99	98	100	99	98	98	96	97

==== Day 6 ====
The twenty-third and final round of voting was held during the 61st plenary session of the General Assembly.

Latin American and Caribbean States election results
Member	Round 23
Panama	111
Costa Rica	16
Cuba	2
Bolivia	1
Colombia	1
Honduras	1
Nicaragua	1
Peru	1
Suriname	1
abstentions	5
invalid ballots	0
required majority	90

== See also ==
- List of members of the United Nations Security Council
- Japan and the United Nations
