= 1964 United Nations Security Council election =

Election to the United Nations Security Council

- 29 & 30 December 1964

four of six non-permanent seats on the United Nations Security Council
Members before election
Czechoslovakia
Brazil
Morocco
Norway
New Members
Malaysia
Uruguay
Jordan
Netherlands

The 1964 United Nations Security Council election was held on 29 and 30 December during the nineteenth session of the United Nations General Assembly, held at United Nations Headquarters in New York City. The General Assembly elected four members through consultation of the president, as non-permanent members of the UN Security Council for two-year mandates commencing on 1 January 1965.

== Rules ==
The Security Council has 15 seats, filled by five permanent members and ten non-permanent members. Each year, half of the non-permanent members are elected for two-year terms. A sitting member may not immediately run for re-election.

== Result ==
At this time, the United Nations had 115 member states (for a timeline of UN membership, see Enlargement of the United Nations). There were five candidacies for four seats. At the meeting on 29 December 1964, the President of the United Nations General Assembly proposed granting seats to Uruguay, Malaysia, and the Netherlands, a motion that was approved by the assembly. Further discussion of the candidacies of Mali and Jordan was moved to another day.

Member	Round 1
Netherlands	Member
Malaysia	Member (Note: End of the one year term of Czechoslovakia)
Uruguay	Member
Jordan	Not Member
Mali	Not Member

At another meeting on 30 December 1964, it was agreed that Jordan would occupy the seat for the first year, and Mali for the second.

Member	Round 1
Jordan	Member
Mali	Not Member

Since the UN Charter amendment increasing the size of the Security Council was in the process of ratification at the time, the General Assembly agreed that if ratification were completed before the 1965 election, both Jordan and Mali would get full two-year terms. This in fact happened, and the amendment was ratified 31 August 1965.

== See also ==
- List of members of the United Nations Security Council
- Brazil and the United Nations
- Canada and the United Nations
- India and the United Nations
