= 2024 United Nations Security Council election =

Election to the United Nations Security Council

- 6 June 2024

5 of 10 non-permanent seats on the United Nations Security Council
- United Nations Security Council membership after the election Permanent members Non-permanent members
- Outgoing members Mozambique (Africa) Japan (Asia–Pacific) Ecuador (GRULAC) Malta (WEOG) Switzerland (WEOG) Elected members Somalia (Africa) Pakistan (Asia–Pacific) Panama (GRULAC) Denmark (WEOG) Greece (WEOG)

The 2024 United Nations Security Council election was held on 6 June 2024 during the 78th session of the United Nations General Assembly, held at United Nations Headquarters in New York City. The elections are for five non-permanent seats on the UN Security Council for two-year mandates commencing on 1 January 2025. In accordance with the Security Council's rotation rules, whereby the ten non-permanent UNSC seats rotate among the various regional blocs into which UN member states traditionally divide themselves for voting and representation purposes, the five available seats are allocated as follows:

- One for the African Group
- One for the Asia-Pacific Group
- One for the Latin American and Caribbean Group
- Two for the Western European and Others Group

The five members served on the Security Council for the 2025–26 period.

== Candidates ==
=== African Group ===
- Somalia
- Mauritius

=== Asia-Pacific Group ===
- Pakistan

=== Latin American and Caribbean Group ===
- Panama

=== Western European and Others Group ===
- Denmark
- Greece

== Results ==
=== African and Asia-Pacific Groups ===
African and Asia-Pacific Groups election results
Member	Round 1
Pakistan	182
Somalia	179
valid ballots	190
abstentions	5
present and voting	185
required majority	124

=== Latin American and Caribbean Group ===
Latin American and Caribbean Group election results
Member	Round 1
Panama	183
Argentina	1
valid ballots	190
abstentions	6
present and voting	184
required majority	123

=== Western European and Others Group ===
Western European and Others Group election results
Member	Round 1
Denmark	184
Greece	182
Italy	1
Norway	1
valid ballots	190
abstentions	2
present and voting	188
required majority	126

== See also ==
- List of members of the United Nations Security Council
