= Instruments of Independence =

Legal document establishing Fijian independence

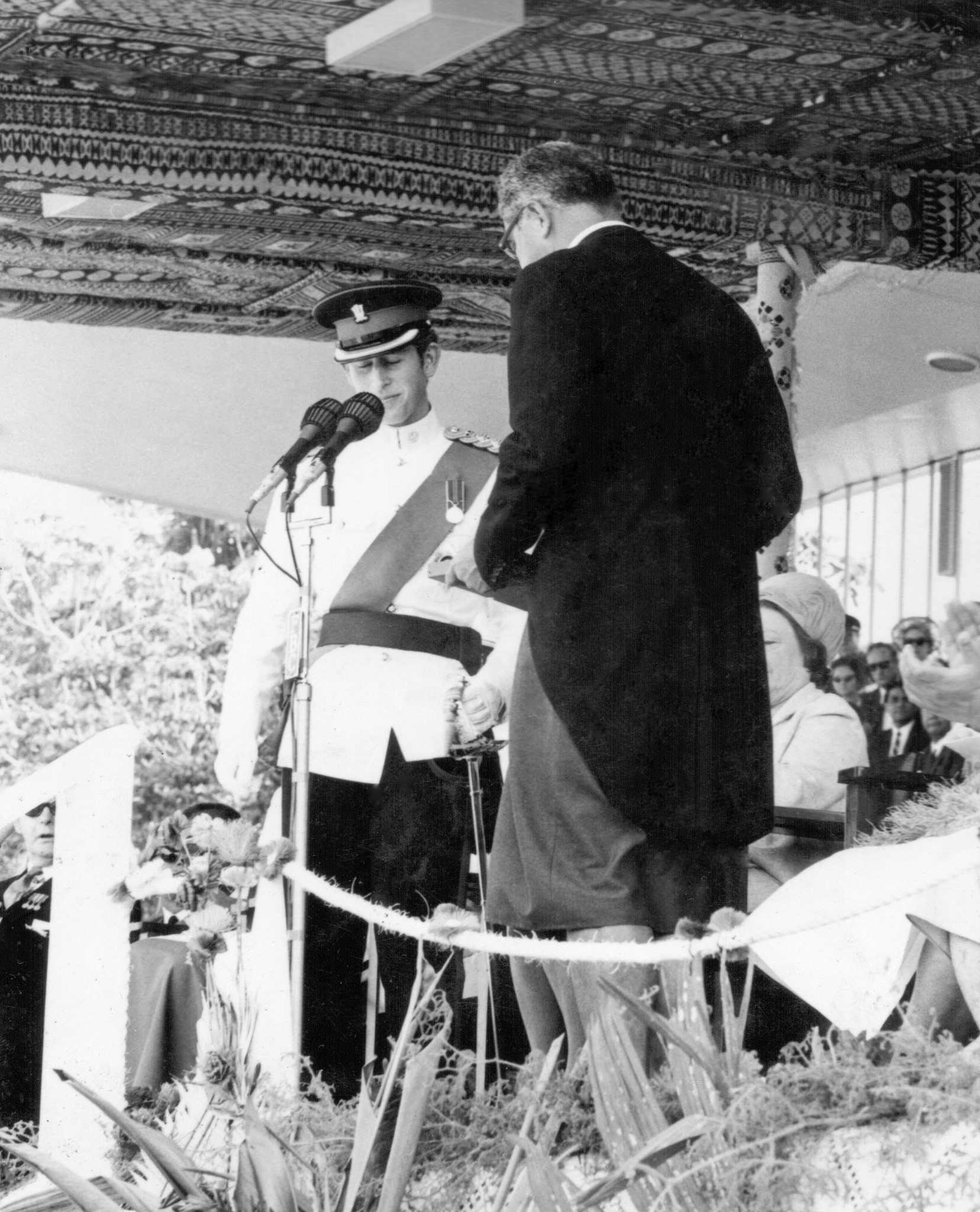
Instruments of Independence 1970

The Instruments of Independence is a legal document that established Fiji's independence from the United Kingdom in 1970, when it was handed over by Prince Charles on behalf of the British Monarch on 10 October.

The document was lost by the National Archives of Fiji and the Fijian Government requested a copy of the document retained by the United Kingdom in 2010. It had been missing since at least 2005.

The Prime Minister's Office was unsure whether they held the document, and Fiji Museum Director Sagale Buadromo told the Fiji Live news service on 26 January 2006 that it was not and had never been in their possession. Government Archivist Setareki Tale said it was possible that the then-Governor-General, Sir Robert Sidney Foster, had returned the document to the United Kingdom - but that was only conjecture.

The document was recovered at the National Archives of Fiji in 2014. The Acting Principal Archivist Timoci Balenaivalu said in 2020 that it was found during a stock take, and that it was not missing, but was not recorded in the Archives' inventory during a transfer of records.
