= 2022 in the United Nations =

- Decades: 2000s; 2010s; 2020s
- See also: History of the United Nations (Peacekeeping); List of years of the United Nations

The following lists events that happened with or in collaboration with the United Nations and its agencies in the year 2022.

== Leadership ==
=== Secretary General of the United Nations ===
António Manuel de Oliveira Guterres (Portugal)

=== Deputy Secretary General of the United Nations ===
Amina Jane Mohammed (Nigeria)

=== President of the General Assembly ===
Abdulla Shahid (Until 13 September) (Maldives)

Csaba Kőrösi (13 September onward) (Hungary)

=== President of the Economic and Social Council ===
Collen Vixen Kelapile (Until 27 July) (Botswana)

Lachezara Stoeva (27 July onward) (Bulgaria)

=== United Nations Agencies ===
Director-General of the Universal Postal Union (UPU)

Masahiko Metoki (Japan)

Director-General of the World Health Organization (WHO)

Tedros Adhanom Ghebreyesus (Ethiopia)

Executive Director of the United Nations Population Fund (UNFPA)

Natalia Kanem (Tanzania)

Executive Director of the World Food Programme (WFP)

David Beasley (United States)

Secretary General of the United Nations World Tourism Organization (UNWTO)

Zurab Pololikashvili (Georgia)

Secretary General of the World Meteorological Organization (WMO)

Petteri Taalas (Finland)

=== United Nations Department and Offices ===
High Commissioners for Human Rights for the Office of the High Commissioner for Human Rights (OHCHR)

Michelle Bachelet (Until 31 August) (Chile)

Volker Türk (8 September onward) (Austria)

Under-Secretary-General for the United Nations Office of Internal Oversight Services (OIOS)

Fatoumata Ndiaye (Senegal)

== International Observances ==
=== International Years ===
International Year of Artisanal Fisheries and Aquaculture

International Year of Basic Sciences for Sustainable Development

International Year of Glass

International Year of Sustainable Mountain Development

=== International Decades ===
International Decade of Indigenous Languages (2022–2032)

Fourth International Decade for the Eradication of Colonialism (2021–2030)

Second Decade of Action for Road Safety (2021–2030)

United Nations Decade of Healthy Ageing (2021–2030)

United Nations Decade of Ocean Science for Sustainable Development (2021–2030)

United Nations Decade on Ecosystem Restoration (2021–2030)

Nelson Mandela Decade of Peace (2019–2028)

United Nations Decade of Family Farming (2019–2028)

International Decade for Action "Water for Sustainable Development" (2018–2028)

Third United Nations Decade for the Eradication of Poverty (2018–2027)

Third Industrial Development Decade for Africa (2016–2025)

United Nations Decade of Action on Nutrition (2016–2025)

International Decade for People of African Descent (2015–2024)

United Nations Decade of Sustainable Energy for All (2014–2024)

== Events ==
=== February ===
- 28 February: Eleventh emergency special session of the United Nations General Assembly was initiated to address the Russian invasion of Ukraine.

=== June ===
- 9 June: The 2022 United Nations Security Council Election concluded with Mozambique, Japan, Ecuador, Malta and Switzerland elected to the non-permanent seats for 2023.
