= 2021 in the United Nations =

- Decades: 2000s; 2010s; 2020s
- See also: History of the United Nations (Peacekeeping); List of years of the United Nations

The following lists events that happened with or in collaboration with the United Nations and its agencies in the year 2021.

== Leadership ==
=== Secretary General of the United Nations ===
António Manuel de Oliveira Guterres (Portugal)

=== Deputy Secretary General of the United Nations ===
Amina Jane Mohammed (Nigeria)

=== President of the General Assembly ===
Volkan Bozkır (Turkey)

=== President of the Economic and Social Council ===
Munir Akram (July 23, 2020 — Present) (Pakistan)

=== United Nations agencies ===
Director-General of the Universal Postal Union (UPU)

Bishar Hussein (Kenya)

Director-General of the World Health Organization (WHO)

Tedros Adhanom (Ethiopia)

Executive Director of the United Nations Population Fund (UNFPA)

Natalia Kanem (Tanzania)

Executive Director of the World Food Programme (WFP)

David Beasley (United States of America)

Secretary General of the United Nations World Tourism Organization (UNWTO)

Zurab Pololikashvili (Georgia)

Secretary General of the World Meteorological Organization (WMO)

Petteri Taalas (Finland)

=== United Nations Department and Offices ===
High Commissioners for Human Rights for the Office of the High Commissioner for Human Rights (OHCHR)

Michelle Bachelet (Chile)

Under-Secretary-General for the United Nations Office of Internal Oversight Services (OIOS)

Heidi Mendoza ( Philippines)

== International observances ==
=== International Years ===
- International Year of Fruits and Vegetables
- International Year for the Elimination of Child Labour
- International Year of Creative Economy for Sustainable Development
- International Year of Peace and Trust

=== International Decades ===
- United Nations Decade on Ecosystem Restoration (2021-2030)
- United Nations Decade of Healthy Ageing (2021-2030)
- United Nations Decade of Ocean Science for Sustainable Development (2021-2030)
- Nelson Mandela Decade of Peace (2019-2028)
- United Nations Decade of Family Farming (2019-2028)
- International Decade for Action "Water for Sustainable Development" (2018-2028)
- Third United Nations Decade for the Eradication of Poverty (2018-2027)
- United Nations Decade of Action on Nutrition (2016-2025)
- Third Industrial Development Decade for Africa (2016-2025)
- International Decade for People of African Descent (2015-2024)
- United Nations Decade of Sustainable Energy for All (2014-2024)

== Events ==
=== January ===
- 11 January: Secretary General António Guterres wrote to the UN General Assembly about his intentions to seek a second five-year term as Secretary General to begin on January 1, 2022.
- 14 January: 13 members of the 15 member World Health Organization (WHO) sponsored international team studying the origins of the virus that causes COVID-19 have arrived in Wuhan, China.

=== February ===
- 4 February: The International Criminal Court finds former Lord's Resistance Army commander Dominic Ongwen guilty of war crimes and crimes against humanity.
- 22 February: An attack on a World Food Programme (WFP) convey visiting a WFP-run school feeding program in Rutshuru, Democratic Republic of the Congo kills three. The deaths include WFP staff members and the Italian ambassador to the Democratic Republic of the Congo, Luca Attanasiol.
- 23 February: British Natural Historian David Attenborough speaks to the Security Council warning about the risks of climate change. British Prime Minister Boris Johnson chaired the meeting as the United Kingdom held the rotating presidency.
- 24 February: The first COVID-19 vaccines produced and distributed by the UN program COVAX arrives in Ghana. The 600,000 shots mark the wave of vaccines distributed to low and middle income countries.
- 25 February: The United Nations steps up its response to a new outbreak of Ebola, in Western Africa. The World Health Organization (WHO) has deployed 65 experts to Guinea, flown in vaccines, and given $1.25 million to strengthen Ebola countermeasures in Guinea, Côte d'Ivoire, Guinea-Bissau, Liberia, Mali, Senegal and Sierra Leone.

=== March ===
- 30 March: The report from the WHO sponsored team studying the origins of COVID-19 is published. Director-General of the WHO, Dr. Tedros Adhanom commented on the report saying, "I do not believe that this assessment was extensive enough. Further data and studies will be needed to reach more robust conclusions.”

=== April ===
- 20 April: The World Food Programme (WFP) receives permission from the Government of Venezuela to provide school meals for over 185,000 students by the end of 2021 and 1.5 million students by the end of the 2022-2023 school year.
- 22 April: More than 250,000 doses of COVID-19 vaccine arrived in Syria under the UN COVAX initiative.

=== June ===
- 3 June: The UN launches the Global Operational Network of Anti-Corruption Law Enforcement Authorities (GlobE Network), to fight transnational corruption.
- 7 June: Abdulla Shahid, the Foreign Minister of Maldives is elected President of the 76th session of the UN General Assembly, garnering 143 votes over former Afghan Foreign Minister Zalmai Rassoul's 48.

=== July ===
- 1 July: The Reading Instruction Competence Assessment for California teaching credential candidates to teach special education classes, is administered using three subtests.

== Upcoming events ==
=== November ===
- 1–12 November: The 2021 United Nations Climate Change Conference, also known as COP 26.
