= 2023 in the United Nations =

- Decades: 2000s; 2010s; 2020s
- See also: History of the United Nations (Peacekeeping); List of years of the United Nations

Events in the year 2023 in the United Nations.

== Incumbents ==
- Secretary-General: António Guterres (Portugal)
- Deputy Secretary-General: Amina J. Mohammed (Nigeria)
- General Assembly President: Csaba Kőrösi (Hungary) (until 5 September), Dennis Francis (Trinidad and Tobago) (after 5 September)
- Economic and Security Council President: Paula Narváez (Chile)
- Security Council Presidents: Japan, Malta, Mozambique, Russia, Switzerland, United Arab Emirates, United Kingdom, United States, Albania, Brazil, China, Ecuador (rotates monthly)

== Events ==
- March 4: The High Seas Treaty, which aims to protect 30% of the world's oceans by 2030, is finalized.
- March 17: The International Criminal Court issues an arrest warrant for Russian president Vladimir Putin and Maria Lvova-Belova, Russian Commissioner for Children's Rights, marking the first arrest warrant against a leader of a permanent member of the United Nations Security Council.
- March 20: The Intergovernmental Panel on Climate Change (IPCC) releases the synthesis report of its Sixth Assessment Report on climate change.
- March 30: The International Court of Justice rules that the United States violated its Treaty of Amity with Iran when it allowed its domestic courts to freeze assets held by Iranian companies.
- May 5: The World Health Organization ends its declaration of COVID-19 being a global health emergency, but continues to refer to it as a pandemic.
- May 11: The World Health Organization ends its declaration of mpox being a global health emergency.
- June 19: The United Nations General Assembly unanimously adopts the High Seas Treaty, the first treaty aimed towards marine conservation in international waters.
- June 30: The United Nations Security Council votes unanimously to end MINUSMA, its peacekeeping mission in Mali.
