= 2020 in the United Nations =

- Decades: 2000s; 2010s; 2020s
- See also: History of the United Nations (Peacekeeping); List of years of the United Nations

The following lists events that happened with or in collaboration with the United Nations and its agencies in the year 2020.

== Leadership ==
=== Secretary General of the United Nations ===
António Manuel de Oliveira Guterres (Portugal)

=== Deputy Secretary General of the United Nations ===
Amina Jane Mohammed (Nigeria)

=== President of the General Assembly ===
Volkan Bozkır (Turkey)

=== President of the Economic and Social Council ===
Mona Juul (July 25, 2019 — July 22) (Norway)

Munir Akram (July 23 — Present) (Pakistan)

=== United Nations Agencies ===
Director-General of the Universal Postal Union (UPU)

Bishar Hussein (Kenya)

Director-General of the World Health Organization (WHO)

Tedros Adhanom (Ethiopia)

Executive Director of the United Nations Population Fund (UNFPA)

Natalia Kanem (Tanzania)

Executive Director of the World Food Programme (WFP)

David Beasley (United States of America)

Secretary General of the United Nations World Tourism Organization (UNWTO)

Zurab Pololikashvili (Georgia)

Secretary General of the World Meteorological Organization (WMO)

Petteri Taalas (Finland)

=== United Nations Department and Offices ===
High Commissioners for Human Rights for the Office of the High Commissioner for Human Rights (OHCHR)

Michelle Bachelet (Chile)

Under-Secretary-General for the United Nations Office of Internal Oversight Services (OIOS)

Heidi Mendoza ( Philippines)

== International Observances ==
=== International Years ===
- International Year of Plant Health
- International Year of the Nurse and the Midwife

=== International Decades ===
- United Nations Decade of Family Farming (2019-2028)
- International Decade for Action "Water for Sustainable Development" (2018-2028)
- Third United Nations Decade for the Eradication of Poverty (2018-2027)
- United Nations Decade of Action on Nutrition (2016-2025)
- Third Industrial Development Decade for Africa (2016-2025)
- International Decade for People of African Descent (2015-2024)
- United Nations Decade of Sustainable Energy for All (2014-2024)
- Decade of Action for Road Safety (2011-2020)
- Third International Decade for the Eradication of Colonialism (2011-2020)
- United Nations Decade on Biodiversity (2011-2020)
- United Nations Decade for Deserts and the Fight against Desertification (2010-2020)
- Nelson Mandela Decade of Peace (2019-2028)

== Events ==
=== January ===
- 1 January: The United Nations launches UN75 Dialogues intended to engage opinion polling in over 50 countries as the organization plans to celebrate its 75th anniversary.
- 22 January: The World Health Organization (WHO) convenes an emergency expert committee on an outbreak of COVID-19 in Wuhan, China in order to determine whether it should be designated a public health emergency of international concern.

=== February ===
- The first round of UN brokered peace talks led by the United Nations Support Mission in Libya concludes in Geneva, Switzerland without a full ceasefire agreement.

=== March ===
- 5 March: The fifth UN Secretary General Javier Pérez de Cuéllar has died at age 100. The first and only Latin American head of the UN so far, Cuéllar held the position for ten years.
- 23 March: UN Secretary-General Guterres issues the 'Appeal for Global Ceasefire', a call for a global ceasefire.
- 24 March: The UN Security Council convenes its first ever private video-teleconferencing meeting, covering the UN Organization Stabilization Mission (MONUSCO) in the Democratic Republic of Congo. It comes after a month-long debate on new Security Council working methods.
- 30 March: For the first time in history, UN Security Council members vote in writing, conveying their positions by email. They unanimously approved four resolutions: one on the UN Assistance Mission in Somalia (UNSOM); one relating to the Panel of Experts assisting the work of the 1718 Democratic People's Republic of Korea Sanctions Committee; another on the African Union-United Nations Hybrid Operation in Darfur; and a new resolution on improving safety and security of peacekeepers.

=== April ===
- 15 April: US President Donald Trump withholds funding to the World Health Organization (WHO) over its handling of the COVID-19 outbreak.
- 25 April: The United Nations commemorates the 75th anniversary of the San Francisco Conference with the first annual International Delegates Day.

=== May ===
- 10 May: Three Chadian peacekeepers with MINUSMA were killed, and four wounded, in a roadside bomb attack in Aguelhok, Mali. Members of the Security Council condemned the attack and called upon the government of Mali to swiftly investigate the attack and bring the perpetrators to justice.
- 14 May: The government of Burundi expels four members of the WHO from the country.
- 21 May: Secretary-General António Guterres launches a new initiative dubbed, Verified, to fight misinformation related to the COVID-19 Pandemic. Led by the UN Department of Global Communications, the initiative plans to partner with UN agencies, influences, business, media organizations and others to share accurate content.
- 25 May: For the first time ever, the UN Military Gender Advocate Award was given to two UN Peacekeepers, Brazilian Naval officer, Carla Monteiro de Castro Araujo, and Indian Army Major, Suman Gawani. Nominated by force commanders, the award recognizes the effort of individual peacekeepers to promote the role of women in peace operations.
- 28 May: Michelle Bachelet, the UN High Commissioner for Human Rights, condemns the murder of George Floyd and urges "serious action" to stop the US police killings of African Americans. She also urged protestors to air the grievances peacefully and for police to restrain further use of excessive force.

=== June ===
- 3 June: Nearly 50 medical experts and first responders from the World Health Organization, arrived in Mbandaka, Democratic Republic of the Congo with vaccines and tests to respond to the a new outbreak of Ebola.
- 17 June:
  - Turkish Diplomat Volkan Bozkir is elected to preside over the landmark 75th session of the UN General Assembly. He was the sole candidate.
  - The 2020 UN Security Council Elections fill four of the five non-permanent seats available for two-year mandates commencing on 1 January 2021. India, Mexico, Ireland, and Norway are elected in the first round of socially distanced voting.
- 18 June: In a second round of voting, Kenya is elected to fill the one remaining non-permanent seat on the Security Council, defeating Djibouti in the 2020 UN Security Council Elections.
- 19 June: The UN Human Rights Council unanimously adopts a resolution asking the UN High Commissioner for Human Rights prepare "a report on systemic racism, violations of international human rights law against Africans and people of African descent by law enforcement agencies, especially those incidents that resulted in the death of George Floyd and other Africans and of people of African descent" as well as an examination of the "governments responses to anti-racism peaceful process peaceful protests, including the alleged use of excessive force against protesters, bystanders and journalists."
- 24 June: In an initiative led by Malaysia, 172 member states and observers endorse Secretary General Guterres' call for a global ceasefire during the COVID-19 pandemic. The statement is unbinding and has no legal binding on any country.
- 26 June:
  - In a virtual ceremony, the UN celebrates the 75th anniversary of the signing of the UN Charter. The Charter was signed in San Francisco, USA on 26 June 1945 at the end of the United Nations Conference on International Organization.
  - Nearly 50 independent UN Human Rights experts highlighted their concern on the human rights situation in China. They voiced concern for many actions including but not limited to allegations of forced labor; arbitrary interferences with the right to privacy; restrictive cybersecurity, anti-terrorism, and sedition laws; the retaliation against journalists, medical workers and others speaking out about COVID-19; the repression of ethnic minorities in Xinjiang and Tibet; and the repression of protests and democracy advocacy in the Hong Kong Special Administrative Region (SAR). They urged China to "withdraw the draft national security law for Hong Kong”.
  - The UN Office of Internal Oversight Services launches investigation into a social media video that shows a woman straddling a man on the back seat engaging in a sex act in a UN marked vehicle. The equipment likely belongs to the United Nations Truce Supervision Organization (UNTSO).

=== July ===
- 1 July: With regard to Secretary-General António Guterres' global ceasefire appeal, the UN Security Council passes resolution S/RES/2532 (2020), demanding a "a general and immediate cessation of hostilities in all situations on its agenda" and expressing support for "the efforts undertaken by the Secretary-General and his Special Representatives and Special Envoys" in that respect.
- 14 July: The International Court of Justice rules in favor of Qatar, rejecting an appeal by Bahrain, Saudi Arabia, Egypt and the United Arab Emirates (UAE), allowing the International Civil Aviation Organization (ICAO) to determine the legality of a 2017 package of sanctions which included air blockades.

=== September ===
- 7 September: The world commemorates the first International Day of Clean Air after a 2019 General Assembly resolution recognized the importance of clean air and the impact of air pollution on human health and ecosystems.
- 22 September: The 75th session of the UN General Assembly's first day of the high-level General Debate starts virtually, with member states submitting a pre-recorded video. The 75th session will see the introduction of the ‘silence procedure.’ Under this method, draft resolutions are circulated by the president of the General Assembly, which gives Member States a deadline of at least 72 hours, to raise objections. If there are no objections, the President circulates a letter, confirming that the resolution has been adopted.

=== October ===
- 9 October: The Norwegian Nobel Committee has decided to award the 2020 Nobel Peace Prize to the World Food Programme (WFP).

=== December ===
- 2 December: The WHO's Commission on Narcotic Drugs (CND) voted to remove cannabis from Schedule IV, which includes drugs that are recognized as having little to no therapeutic purposes. 27 members voted in favor, 25 against, and one abstained. its use for non-medical and non-scientific purposes will remain illegal.

== Scheduled events ==
=== October ===
- The 15th meeting of the Conference of Parties (COP) to the Convention on Biological Diversity (CBD) in Kunming, China is set to mark the end of the United Nations Decade on Biodiversity. The COP is expected to adopt a post-2020 global biodiversity framework.

== Postponed events ==
The 26th session of the Conference of the Parties (COP26) of the UN Framework Convention on Climate Change (UNFCCC) was scheduled to take place on 9–19 November in Glasgow, UK but in May 2020 was rescheduled for November 2021.
