= 2019 in the United Nations =

- Decades: 1990s; 2000s; 2010s; 2020s
- See also: History of the United Nations (Peacekeeping); List of years of the United Nations

The following lists events that happened with or in collaboration with the United Nations and its agencies in the year 2019.

== Leadership ==
=== Secretary General of the United Nations ===
António Manuel de Oliveira Guterres (Portugal)

=== Deputy Secretary General of the United Nations ===
Amina Jane Mohammed (Nigeria)

=== President of the General Assembly ===
María Fernanda Espinosa Garcés (Ecuador)

Tijjani Muhammad-Bande (Nigeria) (As of 17 September 2019)

=== President of the Economic and Social Council ===
Inga Rhonda King (Saint Vincent and the Grenadines)

=== United Nations Agencies ===
==== Executive Director of the United Nations Population Fund (UNFPA) ====
Natalia Kanem (Tanzania)

==== Secretary General of the United Nations World Tourism Organization (UNWTO) ====
Zurab Pololikashvili (Georgia)

==== Secretary General of the World Meteorological Organization (WMO) ====
Petteri Taalas (Finland)

=== United Nations Offices ===
==== Under-Secretary-General for the United Nations Office of Internal Oversight Services (OIOS) ====
Heidi Mendoza ( Philippines)

== International Observances ==
=== International Years ===
- International Year of Indigenous Languages
- International Year of Moderation
- International Year of the Periodic Table of Chemical Elements

=== International Decades ===
- United Nations Decade of Family Farming (2019-2028)
- International Decade for Action "Water for Sustainable Development" (2018-2028)
- Third United Nations Decade for the Eradication of Poverty (2018-2027)
- United Nations Decade of Action on Nutrition (2016-2025)
- Third Industrial Development Decade for Africa (2016-2025)
- International Decade for People of African Descent (2015-2024)
- United Nations Decade of Sustainable Energy for All (2014-2024)
- Decade of Action for Road Safety (2011-2020)
- Third International Decade for the Eradication of Colonialism (2011-2020)
- United Nations Decade on Biodiversity (2011-2020)
- United Nations Decade for Deserts and the Fight against Desertification (2010-2020)

== Events ==
=== January ===
- 1 January: The United States and Israel formally withdraw from the United Nations Educational, Scientific, and Cultural Organization.

=== February ===
- 26 February: Sweden and Switzerland co-host the third High-Level Pledging Event for the Humanitarian Crisis in Yemen raising $2.6 billion USD.

=== March ===
- 11 March - 23 March: 63rd Session of the Commission on the Status of Women addressed the priority theme of "Social protection systems, access to public services and sustainable infrastructure for gender equality and the empowerment of women and girls."

=== April ===
- 11 April: The 100th Anniversary of the International Labor Organization was celebrated with day long events spanning four continents.
- 22 April - 3 May: 18th Session of the United Nations Permanent Forum for Indigenous Issues in New York on the theme of "Traditional knowledge: Generation, transmission and protection."

=== May ===
- 6 May - 10 May: 14th Session of the United Nations Forum on Forests
- 30 May: Secretary General António Guterras is awarded the Charlemagne Prize for his work as former Portuguese Prime Minister and with the United Nations.

=== June ===
- 7 June: The 2019 Security Council Elections saw Niger, Tunisia, Vietnam, Estonia, and Saint Vincent and the Grenadines elected to five non-permanent seats. Notably St. Vincent and the Grenadines sets a new record as the smallest ever Security Council seat holder.
- 21 June: The Centenary International Labor Conference adopted ILO Convention 190 Concerning the Elimination of Violence and Harassment in the World of Work.

=== July ===
- 17 July: The World Health Organization declares the 2019 Kivu Ebola Outbreak in the Democratic Republic of the Congo a Public Health Emergency of International Concern.

=== August ===
- 26–28 August: The 68th United Nations Civil Society Conference takes place in Salt Lake City, Utah. The first US city to host the conference outside of New York City, New York.
- 28 August: Youth climate activist Greta Thunberg arrives in New York City, United States for the United Nations Climate Action Summit after sailing across the Atlantic on the Malizia II. Greeted by 17 sailboats representing the Sustainable Development Goals.

=== September ===
- 9–13 September: The 23rd General Assembly of World Tourism Organization (UNWTO) in Saint Petersburg, Russia drawing over 1,300 high-level participants. It led to the adoption of the first ever Global Convention on Tourism Ethics and marks the first time electronic voting was introduced at a UNWTO General Assembly, replacing paper ballots.
- 17 September: Tijjani Muhammad-Bande starts his term as President of the 74th session of the General Assembly.
- 24-25 September: The Third Extraordinary Congress of the Universal Postal Union convenes in Geneva Switzerland. It is only the third meeting of the 145 year old international body that serves postal service providers.
- 27 September: The United Nations University Centre for Policy Research's Financial Sector Commission on Modern Slavery and Human Trafficking releases its final report, Unlocking Potential: A Blueprint for Mobilizing Finance Against Slavery and Trafficking, during the United Nations General Assembly in New York.

=== November ===
- 6 November: Commissioner-General Pierre Krahenbuhl head of the United Nations Relief and Works Agency for Palestine Refugees (UNRWA) resigned following an investigation by the U.N. Office of Internal Oversight Services on the "misappropriation of operational funds." Secretary General Guterres appointed Christian Saunders, the agency’s acting deputy commissioner general, as officer-in-charge for the interim period.
- 12-14 November: The Nairobi Summit on the 25th anniversary of the International Conference on Population and Development gathers to mobilize the political will and financial commitments in the pursuit of sexual and reproductive health and rights.
- 20 November: World Children's Day celebrates the 30th anniversary of the adoption of the United Nations Convention on the Rights of the Child, the most widely adopted Human Rights treaty in the world.

=== December ===
- 2–13 December: The 2019 United Nations Climate Change Conference (COP25) is scheduled to be held in Madrid, Spain under the presidency of Chile. It incorporates the 25th Conference of the Parties to the United Nations Framework Convention on Climate Change (UNFCCC), the 15th meeting of the parties for the Kyoto Protocol (CMP15), and the second meeting of the parties for the Paris Agreement (CMA2). Various environmental pressure groups including the Extinction Rebellion, have scheduled protests outside the conference venue.
