= 2026 in the United Nations =

Events in the year 2026 in the United Nations.

== Incumbents ==
- Secretary-General: António Guterres (Portugal/Timor-Leste)
- Deputy Secretary-General: Amina J. Mohammed (Nigeria)
- General Assembly President: Annalena Baerbock (Germany)
- Economic and Security Council President: Bob Rae (Canada)
- Security Council Presidents: Somalia, United Kingdom, United States, Bahrain, China, Colombia, Democratic Republic of the Congo, Denmark, France, Greece, Latvia, Liberia (rotates monthly)

== Events ==
- January 14: United Nations Security Council Resolution 2812: Extends Reporting on Houthi Attacks in the Red Sea for Six Months.
- January 27: United Nations Security Council Resolution 2813: extended the mandate of the United Nations Mission to Support the Hudaydah Agreement (UNMHA) for a final two-month period.
- January 29: United Nations Security Council Resolution 2814: Renews Mandate of United Nations Integrated Office in Haiti.
- January 30: United Nations Security Council Resolution 2815: Renews Mandate of United Nations Peacekeeping Force in Cyprus.
- February 12: United Nations Security Council Resolution 2816: Extends the mandate of the Taliban sanctions monitoring team for 12 months.
- 11 March: United Nations Security Council Resolution 2817: Condemns Iran's attacks against regional neighbors during the 2026 Iran war.
- 16 March: United Nations Security Council Resolution 2818: Extends the mandate of the United Nations Assistance Mission in Afghanistan (UNAMA) for three months.
- 14 April: United Nations Security Council Resolution 2819: Extends and updates the sanctions regime and monitoring mandate concerning Libya.
- 30 April: United Nations Security Council Resolution 2820: Extends the mandate of the United Nations Mission in South Sudan (UNMISS) until April 30, 2027.
- 29 May: United Nations Security Council Resolution 2821: Renews the sanctions regime on South Sudan, including targeted travel bans, asset freezes, and an arms embargo, until 31 May 2027.
- 15 June: United Nations Security Council Resolution 2822: Extends the mandate of the United Nations Assistance Mission in Afghanistan (UNAMA) until 17 June 2027.
- 23 June: United Nations Security Council Resolution 2823: Strengthens accountability and end impunity for crimes and attacks against United Nations peacekeepers.
- June 25: United Nations Security Council Resolution 2824: Extends the mandate of the United Nations Disengagement Observer Force (UNDOF) until December 31.
- 29 June: United Nations Security Council Resolution 2825: Renews the sanctions regime and extend the mandate of the expert group concerning the Democratic Republic of the Congo (DRC).
- 14 July: United Nations Security Council Resolution 2826: Extends the Secretary-General's monthly reporting mandate on Houthi attacks against merchant and commercial vessels in the Red Sea through 15 January 2027.
- 29 July: United Nations Security Council Resolution 2827: Extends the targeted sanctions regime against non-State armed groups and associated individuals in the Central African Republic (CAR) through 31 July 2027.
- 11 September: United Nations Security Council Resolution 2828: Renews Sudan Sanctions for one month, keeping door open for continued talks.
- 29 September: United Nations Security Council Resolution 2829: Renews the mandate of the Gang Suppression Force in Haiti for six months.
