= 2021 United Nations Security Council election =

Election to the United Nations Security Council

- 11 June 2021

5 of 10 non-permanent seats on the United Nations Security Council
- United Nations Security Council membership after the election Permanent members Non-permanent members
- Outgoing members Niger (Africa) Tunisia (Africa)^{a} Vietnam (Asia–Pacific) Saint Vincent and the Grenadines (GRULAC) Estonia (EEG) a. Arab state Elected members Gabon (Africa) Ghana (Africa) United Arab Emirates (Asia–Pacific)^{a} Brazil (GRULAC) Albania (EEG)

The 2021 United Nations Security Council election was held on 11 June 2021 during the 75th session of the United Nations General Assembly, held at United Nations Headquarters in New York City. The elections are for five non-permanent seats on the UN Security Council for two-year mandates commencing on 1 January 2022. In accordance with the Security Council's rotation rules, whereby the ten non-permanent UNSC seats rotate among the various regional blocs into which UN member states traditionally divide themselves for voting and representation purposes, the five available seats are allocated as follows:

- Two for the African Group
- One for the Asia-Pacific Group. By tradition, this seat is expected to be filled by an Arab state in the Asia-Pacific group (the prior Arab member, Tunisia, being African).
- One for the Latin American and Caribbean Group
- One for the Eastern European Group

The five members served on the Security Council for the 2022–23 period.

== Candidates ==
=== African Group ===
- Gabon
- Ghana
- Democratic Republic of the Congo

=== Asia-Pacific Group ===
- United Arab Emirates
- Iran

=== Latin America and the Caribbean ===
- Brazil

=== Eastern Europe Group ===
- Albania

== Result ==
=== African and Asia-Pacific Groups ===
African and Asia-Pacific Groups election results
Member	Round 1
Ghana	185
Gabon	183
United Arab Emirates	179
Democratic Republic of the Congo	3
Iran	1
valid ballots	190
abstentions	0
present and voting	190
required majority	127

=== Latin American and Caribbean Group ===
Latin American and Caribbean Group election results
Member	Round 1
Brazil	181
Peru	1
valid ballots	190
abstentions	8
present and voting	182
required majority	122

=== Eastern European Group ===
Eastern European Group election results
Member	Round 1
Albania	175
valid ballots	189
invalid ballots	1
abstentions	14
present and voting	175
required majority	117

2022 marked the first time Albania ever held a Security Council seat. It was Brazil's eleventh time, Gabon's and Ghana's fourth time, and the UAE's second time sitting on the Security Council.

== See also ==
- List of members of the United Nations Security Council
- 2021 in the United Nations
