= List of United Nations Security Council Resolutions 2801 to 2900 =

This is a list of United Nations Security Council Resolutions 2801 to 2900 adopted between 14 November 2025 to present day.

Resolution	Date	Vote	Concerns
2801	14 November 2025	13–0–2 (abstentions: China and Russian Federation)	The situation in Yemen
2802	14 November 2025	12–0–3 (abstentions: China, Pakistan and Russian Federation)	Reports of the Secretary-General on the Sudan and South Sudan
2803	17 November 2025	13–0–2 (abstentions: China and Russian Federation)	The situation in the Middle East, including the Palestinian question
2804	25 November 2025	13–0–2 (abstentions: China and Russian Federation)	The situation in Libya
2805	26 November 2025	15–0–0	Peacebuilding and sustaining peace
2806	12 December 2025	15–0–0	Peace and security in Africa
2807	12 December 2025	15–0–0	Maintenance of international peace and security
2808	19 December 2025	15–0–0	The situation concerning the Democratic Republic of the Congo
2809	23 December 2025	15–0–0	The situation in Somalia
2810	29 December 2025	15–0–0	Threats to international peace and security caused by terrorist acts
2811	29 December 2025	15–0–0	The situation in the Middle East
2812	14 January 2026	13–0–2 (abstentions: China and Russian Federation)	Maintenance of international peace and security
2813	27 January 2026	13–0–2 (abstentions: China and Russian Federation)	The situation in Yemen
2814	29 January 2026	15–0–0	The question concerning Haiti
2815	30 January 2026	13–0–2 (abstentions: Pakistan and Somalia)	The situation in Cyprus
2816	12 February 2026	15–0–0	Threats to international peace and security caused by terrorist acts
2817	11 March 2026	13–0–2 (abstentions: China and Russian Federation)	2026 Iran war
2818	16 March 2026	15–0–0	The situation in Afghanistan
2819	14 April 2026	15–0–0	The situation in Libya
2820	30 April 2026	13–0–2 (abstentions: China and Russian Federation)	Reports of the Secretary-General on the Sudan and South Sudan
2821	29 May 2026	9–0–6 (abstentions: China, Democratic Republic of the Congo, Liberia, Pakistan, Russian Federation and Somalia)	Reports of the Secretary-General on the Sudan and South Sudan
2822	15 June 2026	15–0–0	The situation in Afghanistan
2823	23 June 2026	15–0–0	United Nations peacekeeping operations
2824	25 June 2026	15–0–0	The situation in the Middle East
2825	29 June 2026	15–0–0	The situation concerning the Democratic Republic of the Congo
2826	14 July 2026	13–0–2 (abstentions: China and Russian Federation)	Maintenance of international peace and security
2827	29 July 2026	15–0–0	Peace and security in Africa
2828	11 September 2026	15–0–0	Reports of the Secretary-General on the Sudan and South Sudan
2829	29 September 2026	12–0–3 (abstentions: China, Pakistan and Russian Federation)	The question concerning Haiti
2830	8 October 2026	15–0–0	Reports of the Secretary-General on the Sudan and South Sudan
2831	14 October 2026	14–0–1 (abstention: Russian Federation)	The question concerning Haiti
2832	19 October 2026	15–0–0	Children and armed conflict
2833	30 October 2026	15–0–0	Extends Mandate of the United Nations Verification Mission in Colombia
2834	30 October 2026	15–0–0	The situation in Bosnia and Herzegovina
2835	30 October 2026	13–0–2 (abstentions: Greece and Russian Federation)	The situation in Libya
2836	12 November 2026	15–0–0	The situation in the Central African Republic
2837	12 November 2026	15–0–0	The situation in Yemen
2838	13 November 2026	13–0–2 (abstentions: China and Russian Federation)	Reports of the Secretary-General on the Sudan and South Sudan

== See also ==
- Lists of United Nations Security Council resolutions
- List of United Nations Security Council Resolutions 2701 to 2800
