= 2019 United Nations Security Council election =

Election to the United Nations Security Council

- 7 June 2019

5 of 10 non-permanent seats on the United Nations Security Council
- United Nations Security Council membership after the election Permanent members Non-permanent members
- Outgoing members Ivory Coast (Africa) Equatorial Guinea (Africa) Kuwait (Asia–Pacific)^{a} Peru (GRULAC) Poland (EEG) a. Arab state Elected members Niger (Africa) Tunisia (Africa)^{a} Vietnam (Asia–Pacific) Saint Vincent and the Grenadines (GRULAC) Estonia (EEG)

The 2019 United Nations Security Council election was held on 7 June during the 73rd session of the United Nations General Assembly, held at United Nations Headquarters in New York City. The elections are for five non-permanent seats on the UN Security Council for two-year mandates commencing on 1 January 2020.

In accordance with the Security Council's rotation rules, whereby the ten non-permanent UNSC seats rotate among the various regional blocs into which UN member states traditionally divide themselves for voting and representation purposes, the five available seats are allocated as follows:

- Two for the African Group
- One for the Asia-Pacific Group
- One for the Latin American and Caribbean Group
- One for the Eastern European Group

The five members served on the Security Council for the 2020–21 period.

Notably, St. Vincent and the Grenadines set a new record as the smallest ever Security Council member. Both St. Vincent and the Grenadines and Estonia were elected to the Council for the first time.

== Candidates ==
=== African Group ===
- Ghana (withdrawn)
- Niger
- Tunisia

=== Asia-Pacific Group ===
- Vietnam

=== Latin American and Caribbean Group ===
- Saint Vincent and the Grenadines

=== Eastern European Group ===
- Estonia
- Romania

== Results ==
=== African and Asia-Pacific Groups ===
African and Asia-Pacific Groups election results
Member	Round 1
Vietnam	192
Niger	191
Tunisia	191
valid ballots	193
abstentions	0
present and voting	193
required majority	129

=== Latin American and Caribbean Group ===
Latin American and Caribbean Group election results
Member	Round 1
Saint Vincent and the Grenadines	185
El Salvador	6
valid ballots	193
abstentions	2
present and voting	191
required majority	128

=== Eastern European Group ===
Eastern European Group election results
Member	Round 1	Round 2
Estonia	111	132
Romania	78	58
Georgia	1	—
Latvia	1	—
valid ballots	193	192
abstentions	2	2
present and voting	191	190
required majority	128	127

== See also ==
- List of members of the United Nations Security Council
- European Union and the United Nations
- 2019 in the United Nations
