= 2020 United Nations Security Council election =

Election to the United Nations Security Council

- 17–18 June 2020

5 of 10 non-permanent seats on the United Nations Security Council
- United Nations Security Council membership after the election Permanent members Non-permanent members
- Outgoing members South Africa (Africa) Indonesia (Asia–Pacific) Dominican Republic (GRULAC) Belgium (WEOG) Germany (WEOG) Elected members Kenya (Africa) India (Asia–Pacific) Mexico (GRULAC) Ireland (WEOG) Norway (WEOG)

The 2020 United Nations Security Council election was held on 17 and 18 June 2020 during the 74th session of the United Nations General Assembly, held at United Nations Headquarters in New York City. The elections were for five non-permanent seats on the UN Security Council for two-year mandates commencing on 1 January 2021.

In accordance with the Security Council's rotation rules, whereby the ten non-permanent UNSC seats rotate among the various regional blocs into which UN member states traditionally divide themselves for voting and representation purposes, the five available seats were allocated as follows:

- One for the African Group
- One for the Asia-Pacific Group
- One for the Latin American and Caribbean Group
- Two for the Western European and Others Group

In order of votes received, the countries elected were Mexico, India, Norway, and Ireland, with Kenya elected after a second round of voting the following day against Djibouti in a run off vote. These five members will serve on the Security Council for the 2021–22 period.

The elections were held under special conditions due to the COVID-19 pandemic, with ambassadors only allowed to enter the General Assembly Hall one-by-one to cast their ballots instead of the simultaneous voting that usually takes place.

== Candidates ==
=== African Group ===
- Kenya
- Djibouti

=== Asia-Pacific Group ===
- India

==== Withdrawn ====
- Afghanistan — Withdrew in 2013

=== Latin America and the Caribbean ===
- Mexico

=== Western European and Others Group ===
- Canada
- Ireland
- Norway

==== Withdrawn ====
- San Marino — Withdrew in March 2016

== Campaign ==
=== African Group ===
The African Group seat was contested between Kenya and Djibouti. The seat traditionally rotates between different African subregions, with a single candidate agreed upon from the appropriate subregion for that cycle, and therefore is rarely contested. East Africa was due to be represented in this election, and though the Permanent Representatives' Committee of the African Union endorsed Kenya for the seat by a margin of 37–13, Djibouti challenged this result, emphasizing that Kenya had already served twice on the Security Council and alleging that it was unfairly dismissed because both African countries already on the Security Council were also Francophone.

During the campaign, both countries emphasized their contributions to UN peacekeeping missions. Kenya's platform was centered around a 10-point pledge unveiled by Cabinet Secretary for Foreign Affairs Monica Juma at a campaign launch in Addis Ababa in 2019. The ten points were building bridges, peacekeeping and support operations, regional peace and security, counterterrorism, women peace and security, youth empowerment, humanitarian action, justice, human rights and democracy, and environment and climate change. Juma promised that Kenya would use its seat to promote cooperation between the UN Security Council and the Peace and Security Council of the African Union, noting that the powerful states in the UN had refrained from providing support to African Union Mission to Somalia and that this may set a precedent without further action. Kenya accused Djibouti of bringing "dishonor and disrepute to the African Union" by refusing to exit the race, while Djibouti described the process of the AU nomination as "illegal." Additionally, Kenya highlighted its support for the government and refugees of Somalia and South Sudan as examples of its international responsibility.

Kenya was considered the favorite due to having the support from the African Union, but Djibouti received backing from the Organization for Islamic Cooperation, Arab League, and Organisation internationale de la Francophonie and campaigned aggressively to the end. Djibouti criticized Kenya for its border dispute with Somalia, suggesting that it was therefore unfit to resolve disputes and handle matters of international security. It also played up its strategic location and being the site of military bases for Eastern and Western great powers alike. While both candidates claimed to have Chinese support, Africa experts including Roba Sharamo of the Institute for Security Studies and political scientist Martin Oloo alleged that China was responsible for encouraging the challenge from Djibouti, while Kenya was the preferred candidate of the Western countries.

=== Western European and Others Group ===
The Western European and Others Group race between Ireland, Norway, and Canada was projected to be a closely contested one. In 2018, Ireland invited UN diplomats to a concert by Irish rock band U2 while Canada did the same for a Celine Dion concert. In 2019, Canada attempted to garner support for its campaign by serving poutine to UN diplomats, while Norway responded by distributing waffles, a popular Nordic food, and Ireland hosted a Saint Patrick's Day party at the UN.

Diplomats viewed Norway as being favored for a seat on the Security Council, given its longstanding commitment to diplomatic engagement and multilateralism. Norway was the largest contributor per capita to the UN budget of the three candidates, and the most generous donor of foreign assistance in the world, donating more than 1% of its GDP for international development. Norway's history of diplomatic engagement in mediating conflicts in Latin America and the Middle East also strengthened its candidacy.

Ireland emphasized its unique perspective as a small island nation and its strong, long-lasting commitment to international security and multilateralism. Ireland had 628 officers deployed in UN peacekeeping missions, making it among the largest per capita contributors of peacekeeping forces, and it possessed a reliable record of support for peacekeeping operations since 1958. It was also speculated that it would have benefited from having the support of the member states of the European Union by dint of being the only member in the race. Ireland was seen as having the sympathies of some diplomats for having spent the least amount of time of the three candidates as a member of the Security Council in the past.

Canada had lost its previous attempt to secure a seat in 2010, leading to contentious domestic political debate over the failed campaign. Canada intensified its efforts for 2020, hiring 13 full-time staff and spending $1.74 million on the campaign, exceeded only by Norway's $2.8 million in campaign expenses. Prime Minister Justin Trudeau and Foreign Minister François-Philippe Champagne both played active roles in the campaign. However, obstacles to Canada's bid included its having spent the longest time as an elected member of the Security Council of the three candidates and its consistent voting record in support of Israel.

== Results ==
COVID-19 presented new difficulties to the traditional electoral process. Campaigning plans among the candidates in the months preceding the election were cancelled and replaced with "lobbying via phone and Zoom," and ambassadors submitted their ballots in the UN General Assembly Hall at staggered, prearranged time slots while wearing masks.

Four of the five vacant Security Council seats were filled during the first round of voting, while the African Group required a second round of voting before one country received the requisite two-thirds majority.

=== African and Asia-Pacific Groups ===
==== Day 1 ====
African and Asia-Pacific Groups election results
Member	Round 1
India	184
Kenya	113
Djibouti	78
valid ballots	192
abstentions	0
present and voting	192
required majority	128

India easily secured the uncontested Asia-Pacific seat with 184 votes, guaranteeing an 8th term as a non-permanent member of the Security Council. Prime Minister Narendra Modi celebrated the outcome on Twitter, reiterating that "India will work with all member countries to promote global peace, security, resilience and equity." Meanwhile, the Ministry of External Affairs emphasized India's commitment to reform of the UN Security Council, which it considers to be "a body completely out of sync with changes global realities," under the "New Orientation for a Reformed Multilateral System (NORMS)" approach of External Affairs Minister Subrahmanyam Jaishankar."

==== Day 2 ====
African and Asia-Pacific Groups election results
Member	Round 1
Kenya	129
Djibouti	62
valid ballots	191
invalid ballots	1
abstentions	0
present and voting	191
required majority	128

In the second round of voting for the African Group, Kenya exceeded a two-thirds majority by just a single vote, earning a seat at the Security Council and joining Tunisia and Niger as the third African member in 2021. President Kenyatta called the victory a "demonstration of the country’s growing profile and influence in the community of nations as a steadfast and dependable development partner" and thanked Djibouti for being a "worthwhile opponent." He also reaffirmed Kenya's commitment to its 10-point agenda outlined during the campaign and promised to "endeavor to consolidate and voice Africa's position in the Security Council." Djiboutian Foreign Minister Mahamoud Ali Youssouf congratulated Kenya on Twitter and wished it success during its term.

=== Latin America and Caribbean Group ===
Latin American and Caribbean Group election results
Member	Round 1
Mexico	187
valid ballots	192
abstentions	5
present and voting	187
required majority	125

Mexico won the uncontested Latin American and Caribbean Group with an overwhelming majority of the vote. This will be the first time Mexico has a seat on the Security Council since 2009–2010, and its fifth term overall. President Andrés Manuel López Obrador promised to use the seat to promote peaceful cooperation and defend the principle of self-determination instead of military cooperation and the impositions of major powers.

Foreign Minister Marcelo Ebrard celebrated the outcome on Twitter, declaring it a "great recognition for our country in the whole world."

=== Western European and Others Group ===
Western European and Others Group election results
Member	Round 1
Norway	130
Ireland	128
Canada	108
valid ballots	192
abstentions	1
present and voting	191
required majority	128

Norway and Ireland barely surpassed the two-thirds majority required to be elected in the first round of voting, while Canada fell 20 votes short.

Norwegian Prime Minister Erna Solberg and Foreign Minister Ine Marie Eriksen Søreide celebrated the outcome, with Solberg assuring that Norway will strive to remain on good terms with China, Russia, and the United States, and Søreide asserting Norway is "convinced we can contribute something at the UN." Opposition leader Jonas Gahr Støre thanked the government for taking over the successful campaign that began under a Labour Party government, and expressed hope that the Security Council would pay more attention to conflict prevention rather than simply conflict response.

Irish Taoiseach Leo Varadkar said that his country would use the seat "to advance the causes we've championed, peace and security, conflict resolution, reconciliation, climate action, sustainable development, and gender equality."

In Canada, Prime Minister Justin Trudeau expressed optimism that the unsuccessful campaign had "opened new doors for cooperation to address global challenges, and created new partnerships that increased Canada's place in the world." Meanwhile, opposition leader Andrew Scheer criticized the campaign as "another foreign affairs failure for Justin Trudeau," accusing him of "[selling] out Canada's principles for a personal vanity project."

== See also ==
- European Union and the United Nations
- List of members of the United Nations Security Council
- 2020 in the United Nations
