= United Nations Security Council Resolution 2829 =

United Nations Security Council Resolution

UN Security Council Resolution 2829
- Date: 29 September 2026
- Meeting no.: 10,231
- Code: S/RES/2829 (Document)
- Subject: The question concerning Haiti
- Voting summary: 12 voted for; None voted against; 3 abstained
- Result: Adopted

Security Council composition
- Permanent members: China; France; Russia; United Kingdom; United States
- Non-permanent members: Bahrain; Colombia; DR Congo; Denmark; Greece; Latvia; Liberia; Pakistan; Panama; Somalia

United Nations Security Council Resolution 2829 was adopted on 29 September 2026. According to the resolution, the United Nations Security Council voted to renew an Multinational Security Support (MSS) mission in Haiti to the Gang Suppression Force until 31 March 2027.

China, Pakistan and Russia abstained from voting.

== See also ==
- List of United Nations Security Council Resolutions 2801 to 2900 (2025–present)
