= United Nations Security Council Resolution 2821 =

United Nations Security Council Resolution

UN Security Council Resolution 2821
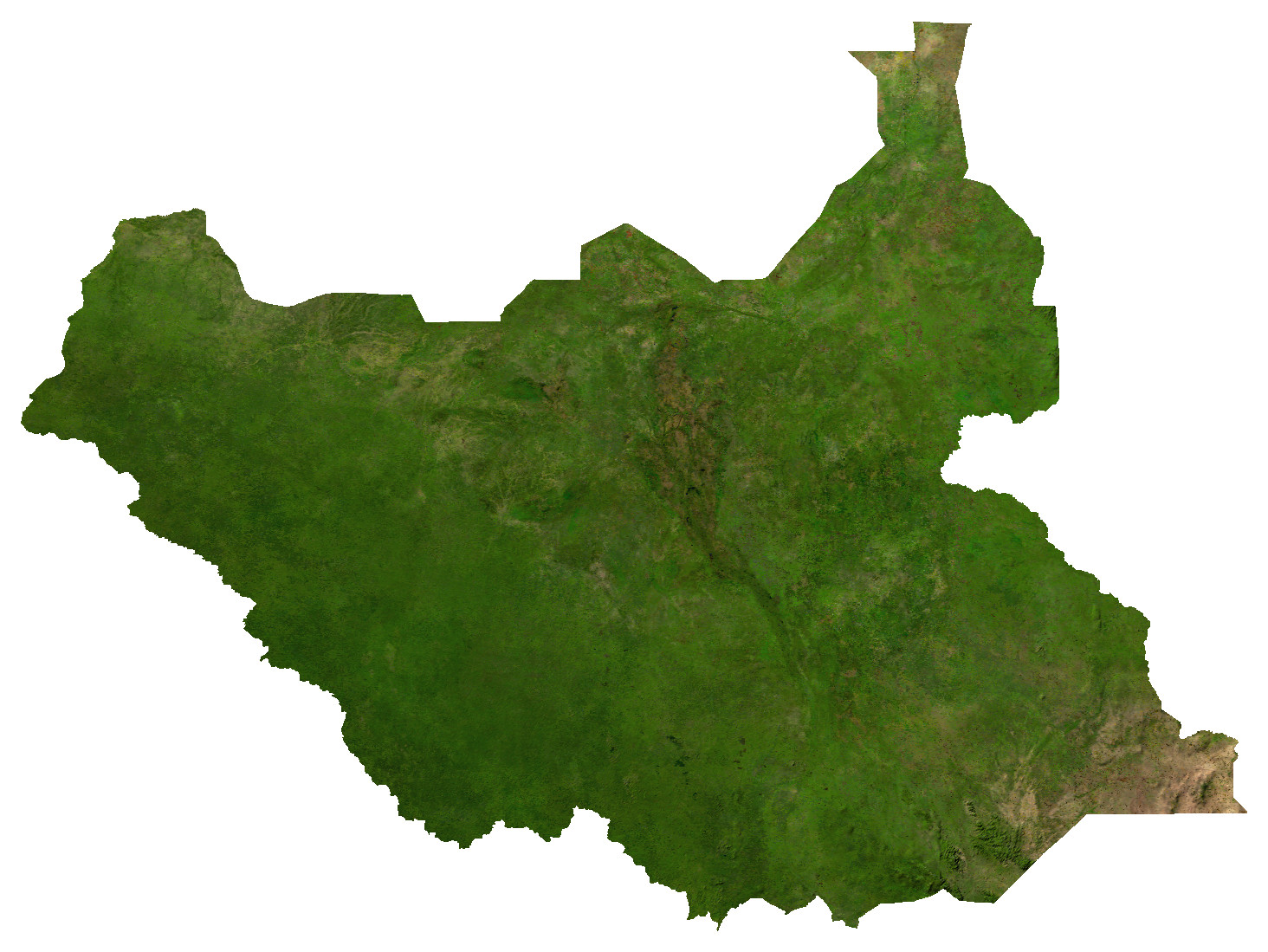
- Map of South Sudan
- Date: 29 May 2026
- Meeting no.: 10,161
- Code: S/RES/2821 (Document)
- Subject: Reports of the Secretary-General on the Sudan and South Sudan
- Voting summary: 9 voted for; None voted against; 6 abstained
- Result: Adopted

Security Council composition
- Permanent members: China; France; Russia; United Kingdom; United States
- Non-permanent members: Bahrain; Colombia; DR Congo; Denmark; Greece; Latvia; Liberia; Pakistan; Panama; Somalia

United Nations Security Council Resolution 2821 was adopted on 29 May 2026. According to the resolution, the United Nations Security Council voted to renew an arms embargo against South Sudan until 31 May 2027.

China, Democratic Republic of the Congo, Somalia, Pakistan, Liberia and Russia abstained from voting.

== See also ==
- List of United Nations Security Council Resolutions 2801 to 2900 (2025–present)
