= Reading Instruction Competence Assessment =

The Reading Instruction Competence Assessment, or RICA, is a test required for two groups of California teaching credential candidates: those seeking a clear Multiple Subjects credential to teach elementary school and those seeking an Education Specialist credential, which is required to teach special education classes.

The exam is administered by National Evaluation Systems, a division of Pearson Education, Inc. The exam consists of 70 multiple choice questions, four constructed responses, and one extended-length case study question.

The RICA Test is given as an assessment of an educator's understanding of effective reading instruction to young learners, as well as the educator's ability to apply that understanding in the classroom.

Beginning July 26, 2021, the RICA Written Test will begin to be administered using three subtests.

Subtest I: 35 multiple-choice questions and 2 constructed-response questions Subtest II: 35 multiple-choice questions and 2 constructed-response questions Subtest III: 25 multiple-choice questions and 1 constructed-response questions

Length of Tests Subtests I and II: 1 hour and 15 minutes per subtest Subtest III: 1 hour and 30 minutes

The RICA focuses on five domains: Domain 1: Planning, Organizing, and Managing Reading Instruction Based on Ongoing Assessment Domain 2: Word Analysis Domain 3: Fluency Domain 4: Vocabulary, Academic Language, and Background Knowledge Domain 5: Comprehension

Point distributed across the domains are as follows:

Domain 1: 10% Domain 2: 33% Domain 3: 13% Domain 4: 20% Domain 5: 23%

== See also ==
- California Reading List
