= United Nations Security Council Resolution 2813 =

United Nations Security Council Resolution

UN Security Council Resolution 2813
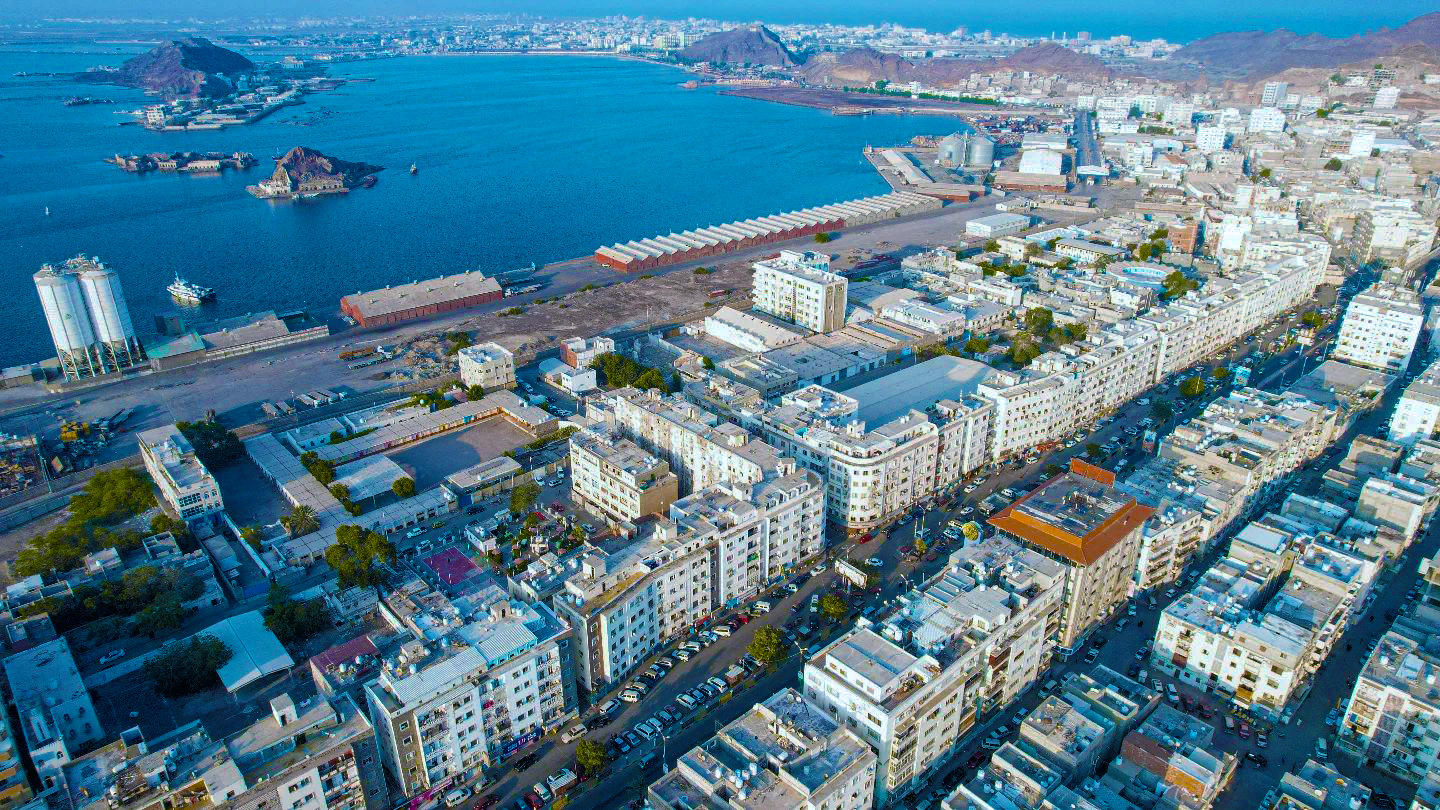
- Mualla District
- Date: 27 January 2026
- Meeting no.: 10,097
- Code: S/RES/2813 (Document)
- Subject: The situation in Yemen
- Voting summary: 13 voted for; None voted against; 2 abstained
- Result: Adopted

Security Council composition
- Permanent members: China; France; Russia; United Kingdom; United States
- Non-permanent members: Bahrain; Colombia; DR Congo; Denmark; Greece; Latvia; Liberia; Pakistan; Panama; Somalia

United Nations Security Council Resolution 2813 was adopted on 27 January 2026. According to the resolution, the Security Council votes for renews mandate of the United Nations Mission to support the Hudaydah Agreement until 1 April 2026.

China and Russia abstained from vote.

== Voting ==
Approved (13)	Abstained (2)	Opposed (0)
Bahrain; Colombia; DR Congo; Denmark; **France**; Greece; Latvia; Liberia; Pakistan; Panama; Somalia; **United Kingdom**; **United States**	**China**; **Russia**	

- Permanent members of the Security Council are in bold.

== See also ==
- List of United Nations Security Council Resolutions 2801 to 2900 (2025–present)
