= International Year of Creative Economy for Sustainable Development =

The International Year of Basic Sciences for Sustainable Development was proclaimed by the 74th session of the United Nations General Assembly in 2019 for 2021. The stated goal was to "promote sustained and inclusive economic growth, foster innovation and provide opportunities, benefits and empowerment for all and respect for all human rights."
