= Masahiko Metoki =

Japanese politician

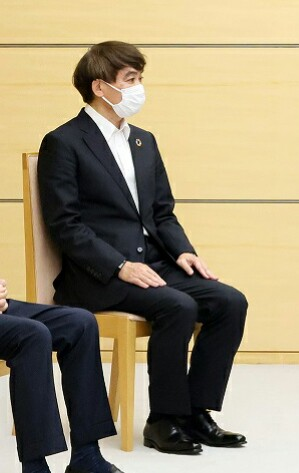
- Masahiko Metoki in 2022
- Born: October 29, 1958 (age 67)
- Occupations: Director General of Universal Postal Union, Agency of United Nations

Masahiko Metoki is a Japanese politician who is serving as Director General of the Universal Postal Union, an agency of the United Nations, since January 2022.
