= 2024 in the United Nations =

List of UN-related events

Events in the year 2024 in the United Nations.

== Incumbents ==
- Secretary-General: António Guterres (Portugal)
- Deputy Secretary-General: Amina J. Mohammed (Nigeria)
- General Assembly President: Dennis Francis (Trinidad and Tobago) (until 5 September) Philémon Yang (Cameroon) onwards.
- Economic and Security Council President: Bob Rae (Canada)
- Security Council Presidents: France, Guyana, Japan, Malta, Mozambique, South Korea, Russia, Sierra Leone, Slovenia, Switzerland, United Kingdom, United States (rotates monthly)

== Events ==
- January 10: United Nations Security Council Resolution 2722: The United Nations Security Council adopts a resolution condemning Houthi attacks on merchant ships in the Red Sea.
- March 19: Haitian crisis: CARICOM and United Nations officials appoint seven seats out of eight of a presidential council to address the political crisis in Haiti. Once the council is installed, Haitian prime minister Ariel Henry will resign.
- March 25: United Nations Security Council Resolution 2728: The UN Security Council passes a resolution calling for an immediate ceasefire in the Gaza Strip and the release of hostages held by Hamas, with the United States abstaining. Israeli Prime Minister Benjamin Netanyahu cancels a planned visit to the U.S. in response to the abstention.
- April 18: The United States vetoes a UN Security Council resolution supporting the State of Palestine joining the United Nations. The vote was 12 in favor, the United States opposed, and two abstentions, from the United Kingdom and Switzerland.
- May 10: United Nations General Assembly Resolution ES-10/23: The United Nations General Assembly votes 143–9 with 25 abstentions to approve a resolution granting Palestine new rights and privileges, and to reconsider Palestine's request to become a UN member. The nine countries that opposed the resolution were Argentina, the Czech Republic, Hungary, Israel, Micronesia, Nauru, Palau, Papua New Guinea and the United States.
- June 7: United Nations advisors announce that it intends to add the Israeli military, Hamas, and Palestinian Islamic Jihad to their list of countries and armed groups that harm children in their upcoming "Children and Armed Conflict" report.
- June 10: United Nations Security Council Resolution 2735: The United Nations Security Council votes 14–0, with Russia abstaining, to back the ceasefire proposal outlined by US president Joe Biden.
- June 13: United Nations Security Council Resolution 2736: The United Nations Security Council votes 14–0, with Russia abstaining, to demand that the Rapid Support Forces stop their siege of Al-Fashir, Sudan, and that all parties maintain humanitarian access and protection for civilians under International Humanitarian Law.
- August 13: Houthis storm the headquarters of the United Nations' Human Rights Office in Sanaa, Yemen, and detain Yemeni workers, and seize official documents.
- September 22: The United Nations adopts the "Pact for the Future", aiming for multilateral cooperative work towards peace and security, global governance, climate change, sustainable development, human rights, and more.
