= Petteri Taalas =

Finnish meteorologist

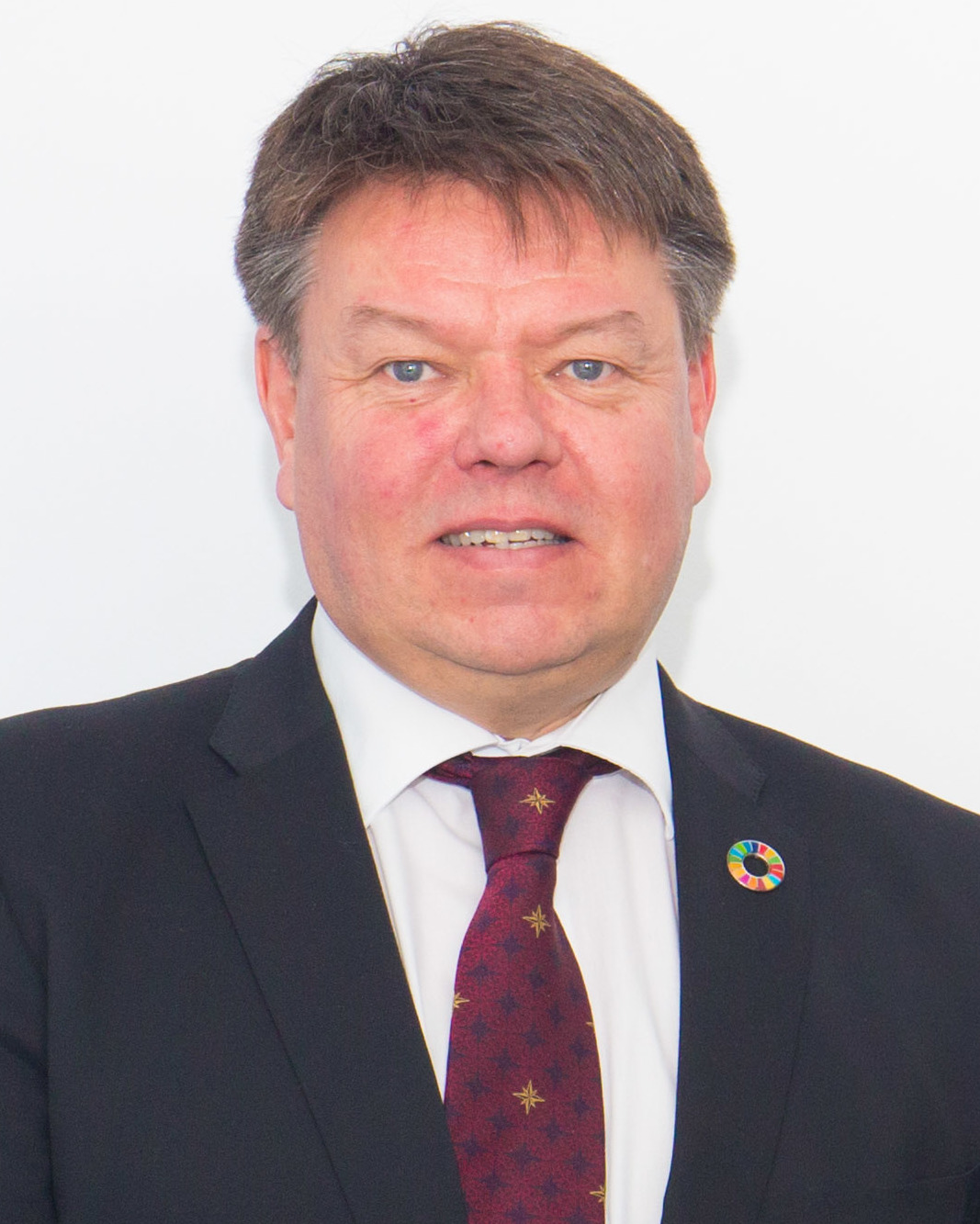
- Born: 3 July 1961
- Alma mater: University of Helsinki; TERI School of Advanced Studies
- Occupation: Meteorologist; administrator
- Employer: Finnish Meteorological Institute (2002–2005); Finnish Meteorological Institute (2007–2015); World Meteorological Organization (2016–)
- Awards: Commander of the Order of the Lion of Finland (2010); Commander First Class of the Order of the Lion of Finland (2021); Commander's Cross of the Order of Merit of the Federal Republic of Germany (2018); Cross of Merit of the Frontier Guards (2014); Medal for Military Merits (2008); Medal of Merit, First Class, of the Civil Defence (2004)
- Position held: secretary (2016–2023)

Jukka Petteri Taalas (born 3 July 1961 in Helsinki, Finland) is a Finnish meteorologist and former Secretary-general of the World Meteorological Organization. Appointed in 2015 by the World Meteorological Congress, the supreme body of the Organization, he took up the four-year Secretary-General term on 1 January 2016, and was re-elected to a second four-year term on 13 June 2019. He was director general of the Finnish Meteorological Institute from 2002 to 2005 and 2007 to 2015.

== Study and early career ==
Taalas studied meteorology, physics, physical chemistry and international development at the University of Helsinki. He was awarded a PhD in meteorology by the Helsinki University Physics Department in 1993, following presentation of his thesis on Arctic and Antarctic stratospheric and lower atmospheric ozone. In 1997, he became a docent at the University of Eastern Finland, and also gave lectures at University of Helsinki and Helsinki University for Technology on atmospheric dynamics, global change and Earth observations. He also pursued management training at Helsinki University in economics in 1998 and 2004 as well as public sector management in 2003. Prior to that he studied international management at Leonardo da Vinci University in Paris in 1996.

After his military service and training at the Naval Academy, he became a reserve officer in 1981 and a reserve captain in 2003, following a National Defense Course. Finnish is his mother tongue. He is fluent in English, has moderate skills in German and Swedish, and basic skills in Russian and French.

== International positions ==
Petteri Taalas was the secretary-general of the World Meteorological Organization. His four-year term started 1 January 2016. He had a mandate from WMO members to develop activities that give greater support to weather, climate and water services, research and development institutions and the private sector.

Taalas was in charge of a historical reform of the WMO constituent bodies and their working practices. The former eight technical commissions were merged into two to promote holistic weather-climate-water-oceans-environment observing systems and services. Better engagement of private sector and world leading scientific experts, as well as key partner organizations was a part of the reform.

UN Secretary General Antonio Guterres appointed Taalas as his climate principal as well as co-chair of the UN climate scientific advisory group. Taalas is active communicator of climate observations and science. He prefers modest and science based climate mitigation and adaptation efforts and understands the political sensitivity of related actions.

Over his career, Taalas has been an adept of change management to enhance efficiency in the various organizations with which he worked, including research institutes, government agencies, universities and private companies. It is his ambition to do so again as WMO Secretary-General. Taalas is motivated to support the developing countries and countries in economic transition, especially through project implementation, for example, in Africa, small-island developing states in the Pacific and Caribbean and in southeast Europe. This motivation guided his career prior to his appointment as WMO Secretary-General, while serving as the Director-General of the Finnish Meteorological Institute (from 2002 to 2015, excluding 2005–2007) and when he was Director of Development and Regional Activities at WMO from 2005 to 2007.

He has extensive experience in managing national and international expert organizations with demonstrated ability to enhance efficiency and implement innovation while maintaining high customer and staff satisfaction. He has a strong scientific background with an emphasis on atmospheric sciences. He has authored about 50 publications on global climate change, satellite methodologies and atmospheric chemistry.

Taalas has held several positions and board memberships in both national and international organizations, serving as a member of the WMO Executive Council and the European Centre for Medium Range Weather Forecasts (ECMWF) Council, and he is past chairman of both the EUMETSAT (2010-2014) and the EUMETNET (2003-2005) councils. He was the first chairman of the board of the University of Eastern Finland (2009-2015), which was formed by merging the universities of Kuopio and Joensuu. He was also on the advisory board and on the board of directors of Fortum energy company (2010-2015), one of the leading low carbon energy providers in Northern Europe.

During his term as the director general of the Finnish Meteorological Institute external funding level doubled, customer and staff satisfactions rose to high levels and the amount of scientific publications tripled. To this date, FMI, one of the most advanced medium-sized weather and marine service organizations, continues to actively assists its sister organizations worldwide. Taalas has also served as a research professor and scientist at FMI dealing with global change, satellites, atmospheric chemistry and UV radiation.

As the WMO director he was reorganizing the WMO development co-operation to pay more attention to services for members and resource mobilizing for assisting the less developed members and their national meteorological and hydrological services.

== Highlight of memberships/honours received ==
- Taalas represented Finland at the IPCC, leading the national IPCC group. He has also been a member of government panels on Arctic, space and climate matters.
- He is a member of Science and Technology Academies, an honorary Member of China Meteorological Association, a Member of Eurasian Academy and an honorary doctor of TERI University in India and University of Eastern Finland.
- He has received Commanders Cross from the president of Finland, Big German Commanders cross, Commander of Honour of Greece as well as first class military, Border Guard and Civil Protection of Finland and first class medal of Estonia on hydrometeorology.
- He was the alumni of the year of Helsinki University in 2012
- Named European of the Year (Reader's Digest award) in 2021 for his work on climate change

== Life and family ==
Born in Helsinki, Finland, in 1961, Taalas married Anni Taalas, née Minkkinen, in 1986. They have two sons (born 1990 and 1996) and three daughters (1993, 1993 and 2000). He speaks fluent English and Finnish, moderate German and Swedish and basic French and Russian.
