= Natalia Kanem =

Panamanian-American medical doctor

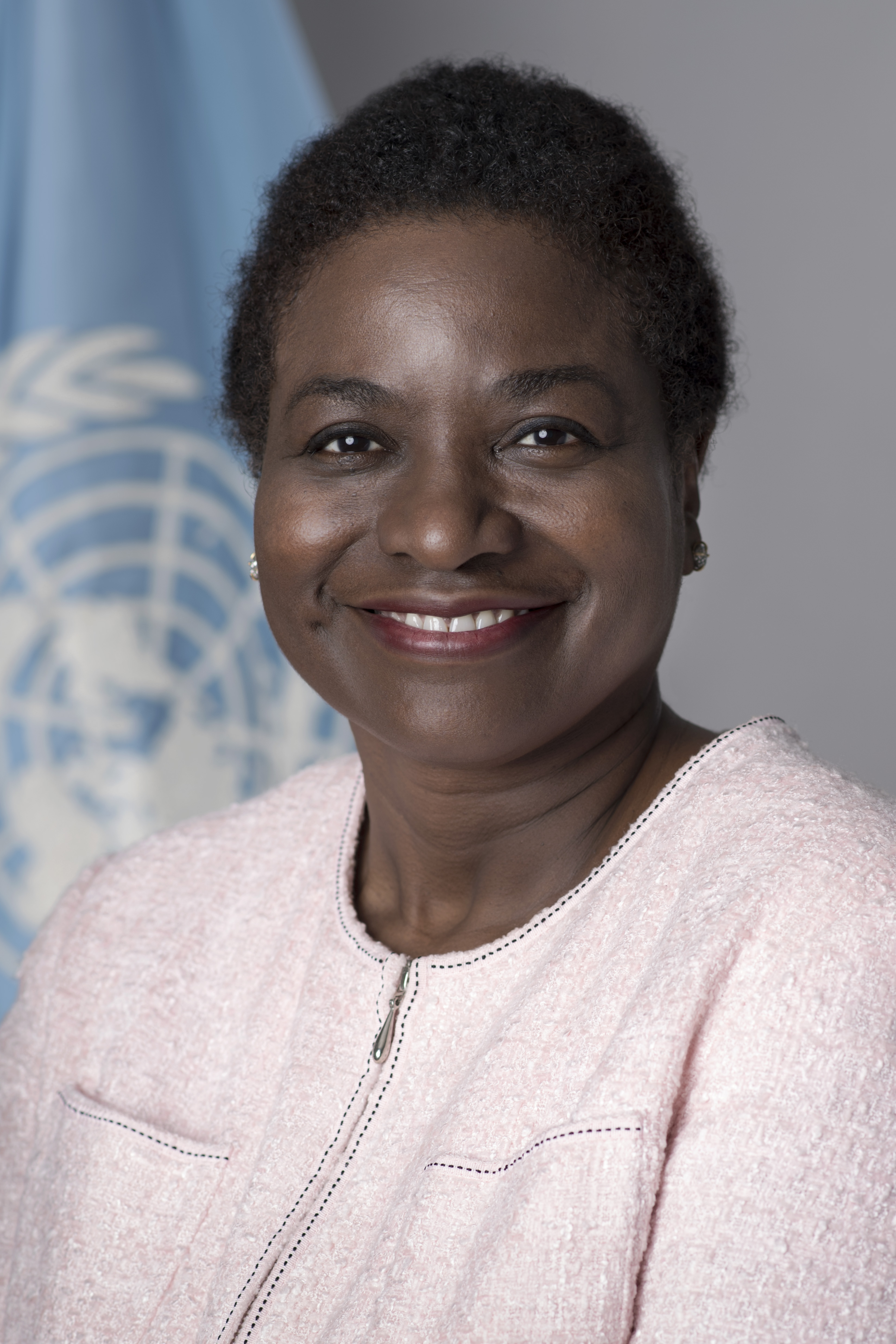
- Official portrait, 2017

5th Executive Director of United Nations Population Fund
- In office 3 October 2017 – 29 August 2025
- Preceded by: Babatunde Osotimehin
- Succeeded by: Diene Keita

Personal details
- Born: 8 November 1954 (age 71)
- Education: Harvard University; Columbia University; University of Washington

Natalia Kanem is a Panamanian-American medical doctor who served as the executive director of UNFPA, the United Nations sexual and reproductive health agency, from 2017 to 2025. In this capacity, she was among the highest-ranking women at the United Nations and the first Latin American to head UNFPA.

== Early life and education ==
Kanem attended Harvard University, where she graduated magna cum laude with a Bachelor of Arts degree in history and science. She became involved in issues relating to women's rights as a Harvard undergraduate when she attended the first UN World Conference on Women in 1975. She went on to earn a medical degree from Columbia University in New York, and a Master in Public Health with specializations in Epidemiology and Preventative Medicine from the University of Washington, Seattle.

== Career ==
From 1992 to 2005 she was at the Ford Foundation, where she pioneered work in women's reproductive health and sexuality, in particular through her position as the foundation's representative for West Africa. She served as Deputy Vice-president for the Ford Foundation's worldwide peace and social justice programmes in Africa, Asia, Eastern Europe, South America, and North America.

From 2005 to 2011, she was the founding president of ELMA Philanthropies, a private institution focusing on children and youth in Africa. From 2012 to 2013 Kanem was at Johns Hopkins University and Columbia University Schools of Medicine and public health. At the same time she was a Senior Associate at the Lloyd Best Institute of the West Indies in Trinidad and Tobago.

Kanem served as United Nations Population Fund representative in Tanzania from 2014 to 2016. She became Deputy Executive Director in charge of programmes at UNFPA Headquarters in New York. and in October 2017, United Nations Secretary-General Antonio Guterres appointed her executive director of UNFPA. Under her leadership, UNFPA has focused on achieving three results: zero maternal deaths, zero unmet need for family planning, and zero gender-based violence and harmful practices. She retired from that position in August 2025. Durig her tenure she served as Ex-Officio Member of the Committee of Cosponsoring Organizations the Joint United Nations Programme on HIV/AIDS (UNAIDS) She was a member of the Board of Governors at the United Nations System Staff College (UNSSC) and Member of the Board at Partnership for Maternal, Newborn & Child Health (PMNCH),

Kanem is co-chair of The Lancet's Commission on 21st-Century Global Health Threats: in March 2026 she gave the Lancet lecture at University College London.

== Other activities ==
- Dag Hammarskjöld Fund for Journalists, Member of the Honorary Advisory Council
- Family Planning 2020 (FP2020), Co-chair of the Reference Group (alongside Christopher Elias, since 2017)
- TrustAfrica, a former Member of the Board
- Inter-American Dialogue, Member
