= History of United Nations peacekeeping =

The United Nations Peacekeeping efforts began in 1948. Its first activity was in the Middle East to observe and maintain the ceasefire during the 1948 Arab–Israeli War. Since then, United Nations peacekeepers have taken part in a total of 72 missions around the globe, 12 of which continue today. The peacekeeping force as a whole received the Nobel Peace Prize in 1988.

Though the term "peacekeeping" is not found in the United Nations Charter, the authorization is generally considered to lie in (or between) Chapter 6 and Chapter 7. Chapter 6 describes the Security Council's power to investigate and mediate disputes, while Chapter 7 discusses the power to authorize economic, diplomatic, and military sanctions, as well as the use of military force, to resolve disputes. The founders of the UN envisioned that the organization would act to prevent conflicts between nations and make future wars impossible; however, the outbreak of the Cold War made peacekeeping agreements extremely difficult due to the division of the world into hostile camps. Following the end of the Cold War, there were renewed calls for the UN to become the agency for achieving world peace, and the agency's peacekeeping dramatically increased, authorizing more missions between 1991 and 1994 than in the previous 45 years combined.

== Early years ==
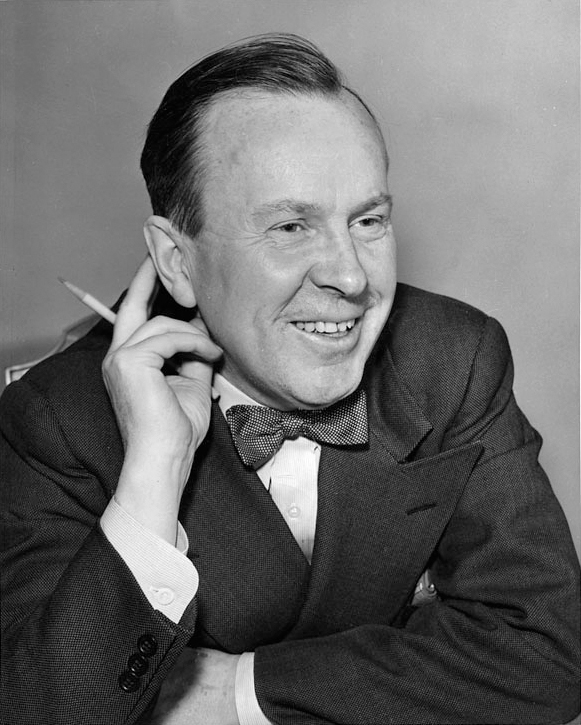
14th Prime Minister of Canada, Lester B. Pearson a Nobel Peace Prize laureate

The League of Nations-controlled International Force in the Saar (1934–35) may be "the first true example of an international peace observation force".

The first UN peacekeeping mission was a team of observers deployed to the Middle East in 1948, during the 1948 Arab–Israeli War. The mission was officially authorized on May 29, 1948. This date is used as a memorial day to all the UN peacekeepers who have died known as the International Day of United Nations Peacekeepers.

In 1956, the UN responded to the Suez Crisis with the United Nations Emergency Force to supervise the withdrawal of invading forces. United Nations Emergency Force as a peacekeeping force was initially suggested as a concept by Canadian diplomat and future Canadian Prime Minister Lester Pearson as a means of resolving conflicts between states. He suggested deploying unarmed or lightly armed military personnel from a number of countries, under UN command, to areas where warring parties were in need of a neutral party to observe the peace process. Pearson's proposal and offer to dedicate 1,000 Canadian peacekeepers to that cause was seen as a brilliant political move. Pearson was awarded the Nobel Peace Prize in 1957 for his work in establishing UN peacekeeping operations. UNEF was the first official armed peacekeeping operation modeled on Pearson's ideas.

== Other ==
The UN also assisted with two decolonization programs during the Cold War. In 1960, the UN sent ONUC to help facilitate the decolonization of the Congo from Belgian control. It stayed on until 1964 to help maintain stability and prevent the breakup of the country during the Congo Crisis. In West New Guinea from 1962 to 1963, UNSF maintained law and order while the territory was transferred from Dutch colonial control to Indonesia.

The Congo served as a development ground for the protocol of Peacekeeping operations in decolonising African nations, and as a result the mission and activities of ONUC changed drastically throughout the operation. What initially was more akin to a security and policing mission quickly developed into an active shooting war as the conflict progressed. UN Resolution 143, which authorised General Secretary Dag Hammarskjöld to intervene in the Congo was subject to varied interpretations by UN civil and military officials, resulting in different actions taken by different contingents of the UN forces in the Congo. As the conflict progressed, the security operations began to place more of a focus on military rather than law enforcement goals, with actions such as Operation Rum Punch or Operation Morthor being carried out as military offensives. As this was an earlier example of UN peacekeeping, especially in the volatile decolonisation processes of Africa, there was hope that this would set the standard for future operations. However, the Congo would be the only African decolonisation programme that the United Nations would involve itself in.

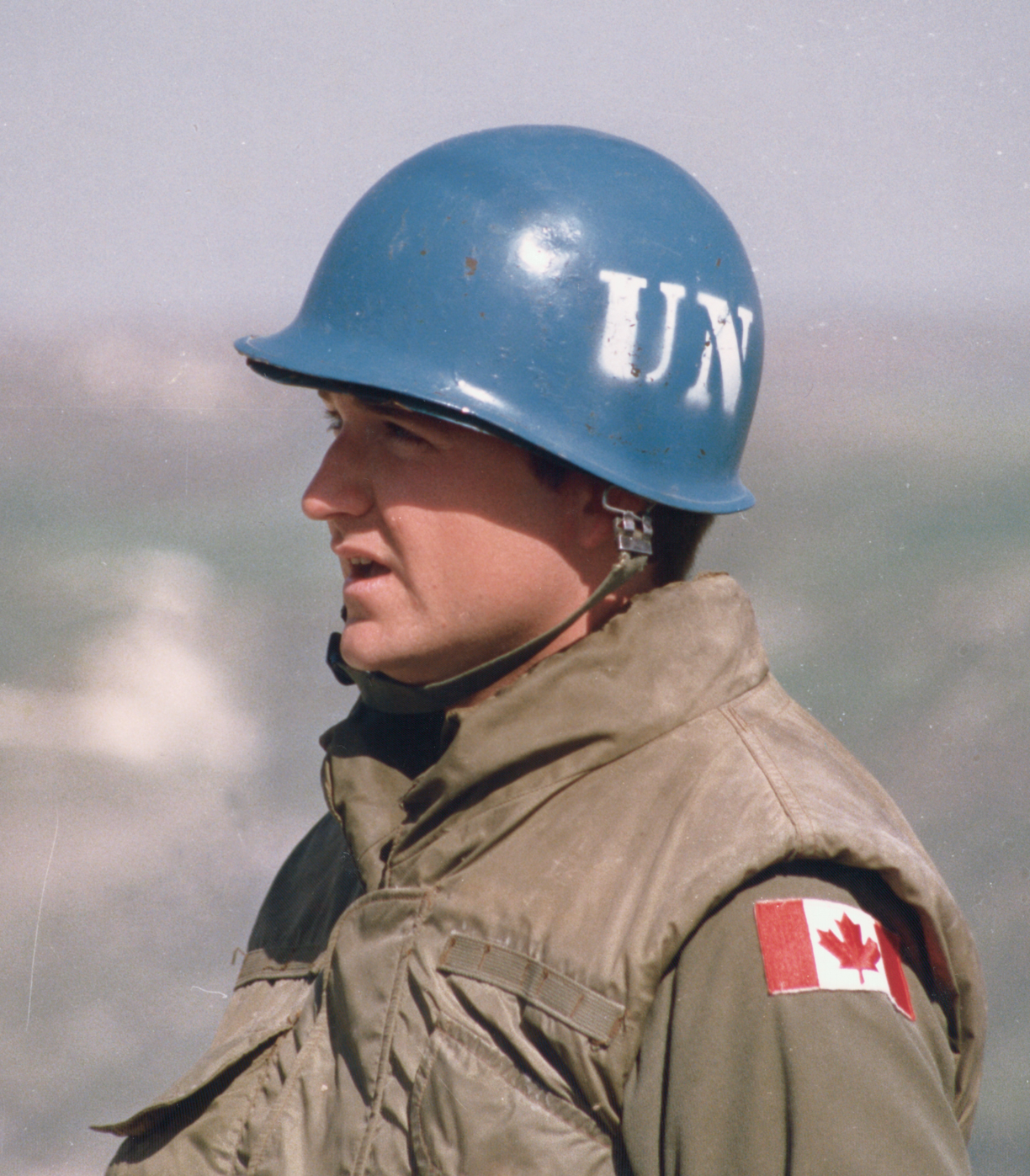
Canadian peacekeeper in 1976 wearing the distinctive UN blue helmet

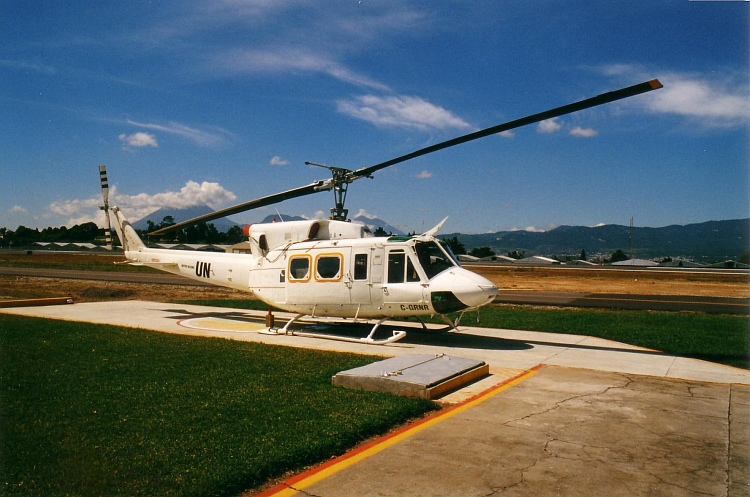
Alpine Helicopters contract Bell 212 on MINUGUA peacekeeping duty in Guatemala, 1998

With the decline of the Soviet Union and the advent of perestroika, the Soviet Union drastically decreased its military and economic support for a number of "proxy" civil wars around the globe. It also withdrew its support from satellite states and one UN peacekeeping mission, UNGOMAP, was designed to oversee the Pakistan–Afghanistan border and the withdrawal of Soviet troops from Afghanistan as the USSR began to refocus domestically.

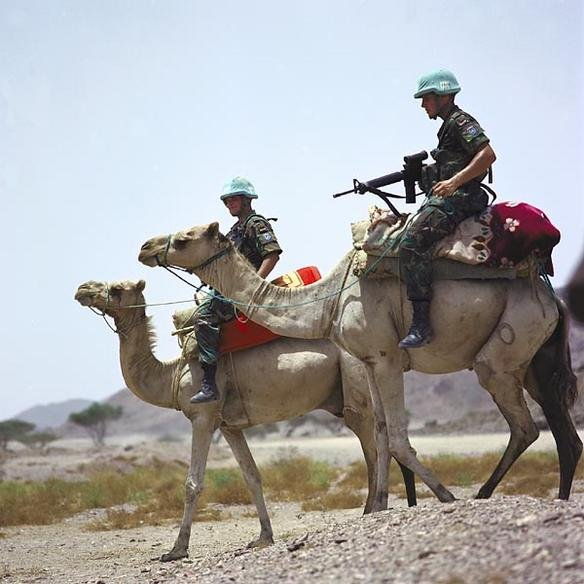
UN Soldiers in Eritrea as part of UNMEE. Photo by Dawit Rezene

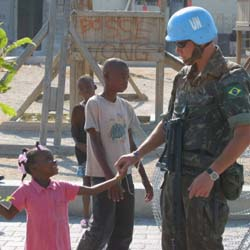
Brazilian MINUSTAH soldier with a Haitian girl.

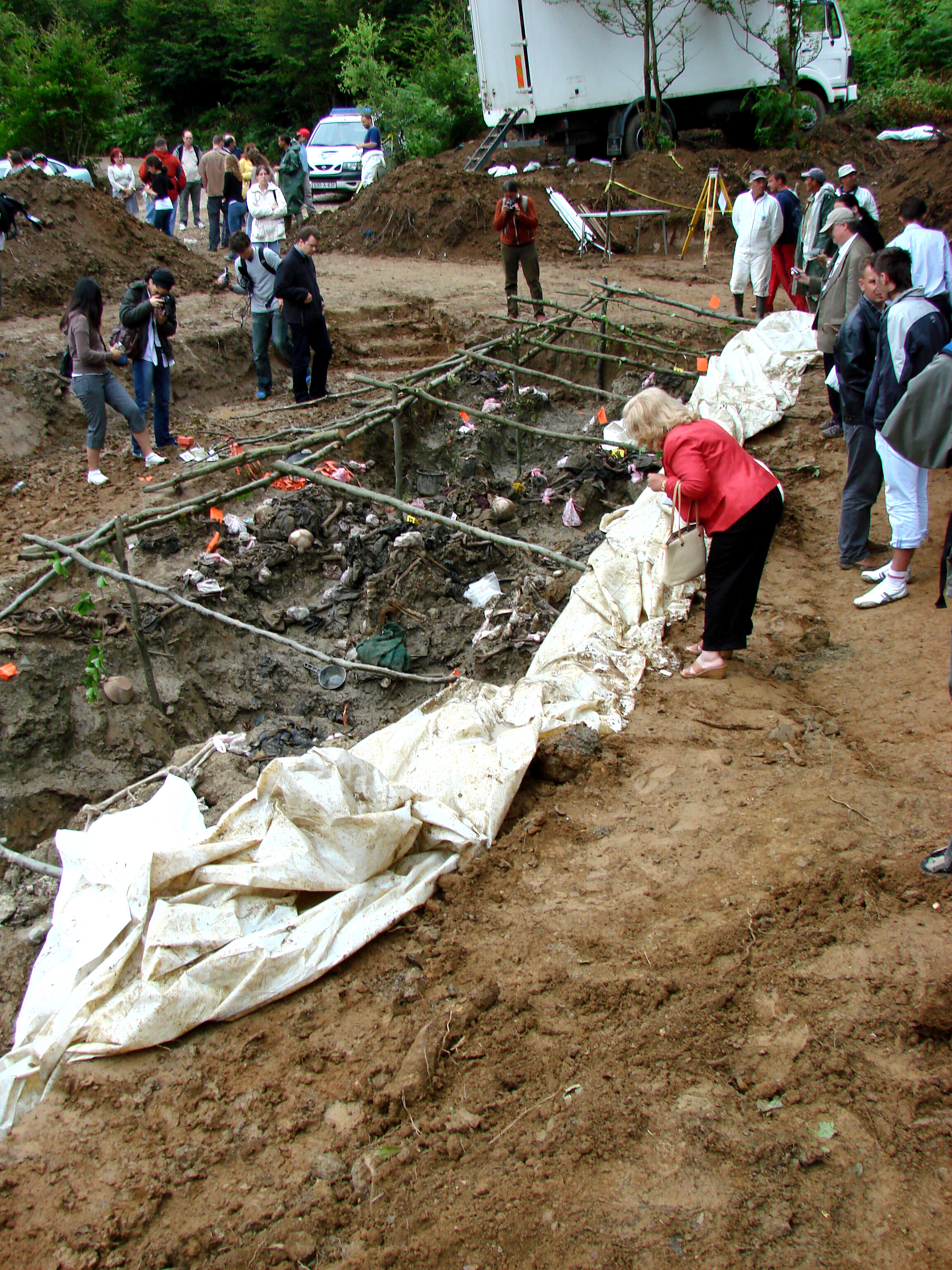
Delegates of the International Association of Genocide Scholars (IAGS) examine an exhumed mass grave of victims of the July 1995 Srebrenica massacre, outside the village of Potočari, Bosnia and Herzegovina. July 2007.

A 2005 RAND Corporation study found the UN to be successful in two out of three peacekeeping efforts. It compared UN nation-building efforts to those of the United States, and found that seven out of eight UN cases are at peace, as opposed to four out of eight US cases at peace. Also in 2005, the Human Security Report documented a decline in the number of wars, genocides and human rights abuses since the end of the Cold War, and presented evidence, albeit circumstantial, that international activism—mostly spearheaded by the UN—has been the main cause of the decline in armed conflict since the end of the Cold War.

The UN has also drawn criticism for perceived failures. In some cases, the Security Council has failed to pass resolutions or the member states have been reluctant to fully enforce them in the face of deteriorating conditions. Disagreements in the Security Council are seen as having failed to prevent the 1994 Rwandan genocide. UN and international inaction has also been cited for failing to intervene and provide sufficient humanitarian aid during the Second Congo War, the failure of UN peacekeepers to prevent the 1995 Srebrenica massacre, failure to provide effective humanitarian aid in Somalia, failing to implement provisions of Security Council resolutions related to the Israeli–Palestinian conflict, Kashmir dispute and continuing failure to prevent genocide or provide assistance in Darfur.

One suggestion to address the problem of delays such as the one in Rwanda, is a rapid reaction force: a standing group, administered by the UN and deployed by the Security Council that receives its troops and support from current Security Council members and is ready for quick deployment in the event of future genocides.

UN peacekeepers have also been accused of sexual abuse including child rape, gang rape, and soliciting prostitutes during peacekeeping missions in the Congo, Haiti, Liberia, Sudan, Burundi, and Côte d'Ivoire.

In response to criticism, including reports of sexual abuse by peacekeepers, the UN has taken steps toward reforming its operations. The Brahimi Report was the first of many steps to recap former peacekeeping missions, isolate flaws, and take steps to patch these mistakes to ensure the efficiency of future peacekeeping missions. The UN has vowed to continue to put these practices into effect when performing peacekeeping operations in the future. The technocratic aspects of the reform process have been continued and revitalised by the DPKO in its 'Peace Operations 2010' reform agenda. The 2008 capstone doctrine entitled "United Nations Peacekeeping Operations: Principles and Guidelines" incorporates and builds on the Brahimi analysis.

In 2013, the NGO Transparency International released a report critical of UN Peacekeeping anti-corruption guidance and oversight.

== See also ==
- List of United Nations peacekeeping missions
- History of the United Nations
- Timeline of United Nations peacekeeping missions
- International Day of United Nations Peacekeepers
- Attacks on humanitarian workers
