= List of members of the United Nations Economic and Social Council =

The United Nations Economic and Social Council has 54 member states which are elected by the United Nations General Assembly for three-year terms, with terms ending on 31 December of the third year. Terms are staggered so that 18 members are elected each year. Seats on the Council are based on the United Nations Regional Groups, with fourteen seats allocated to the African Group, eleven to the Asia-Pacific Group, six to the Eastern European Group, ten to the Latin American and Caribbean Group, and thirteen to the Western European and Others Group.

Unlike the UN Security Council, outgoing members are eligible for immediate re-election. Like the Security Council, getting elected to a seat requires a two-thirds majority vote, so it is possible for two candidates to deadlock with approximately half the vote each, needing negotiations to resolve.

== Membership (1946–1965) ==
The original UN Charter stated that the Economic and Social Council consisted of 18 seats.

=== De facto permanent ===
The UN General Assembly agreed in 1946 that the Security Council's permanent five should be given de facto permanent ECOSOC seats. The Republic of China kept its seat renewed until 1961, when it failed to get a two-thirds majority vote for re-election in 1960.

To prevent the permanent members from occupying 5 out of 6 seats up for election in one year, the permanent five agreed to stagger their terms by English alphabetical order. The Republic of China and France received 3-year initial terms (renewed in 1949, 1952, etc.), the United Kingdom and Soviet Union received 2-year initial terms (renewed in 1948, 1951, etc.), and the United States received a 1-year initial term (renewed in 1947, 1950, etc.).

| Year | De facto permanent seats | | | | |
|---|---|---|---|---|---|
| 1946–1960 | Republic of China | France | Soviet Union | United Kingdom | United States |
| 1961–1965 | see below | France | Soviet Union | United Kingdom | United States |

=== Non-permanent ===
Unlike the Security Council, there was no specific agreement between the superpowers on how many ECOSOC seats would go to each of the then-informal United Nations Regional Groups. Instead, seat arrangements came from "unwritten rules" and "habits" that eventually stabilized into a pattern documented after the fact. For example:

- The first election, for the 1946 term, ended up electing three members from Eastern Europe. However, Yugoslavia and New Zealand had deadlocked on one of the seats until New Zealand withdrew. When Yugoslavia's term ended, New Zealand was elected in its place; that seat became a Commonwealth seat going forward. Meanwhile, the 'original' Commonwealth seat that went to Canada in 1946 eventually became a Middle Eastern seat, so this change did not increase the number of Commonwealth seats long-term.
- One of the Western European seats went to a Scandinavian country and another to a Benelux country, with one exception per seat after the pattern broke.
- As candidates do not run for a specific seat, the arrangement of columns is slightly arbitrary. For example, at the end of 1952, the terms of Czechoslovakia, Pakistan, and Iran were ending, and the outgoing seats were contested by Czechoslovakia, Pakistan, Yugoslavia, India, and Turkey (the former two running for re-election). India and Turkey won election, causing the last seat to deadlock between Czechoslovakia, Pakistan, and Yugoslavia. After thirteen rounds, Yugoslavia finally obtained a two-thirds majority. Had Pakistan won re-election instead, the table may have ended up arranged so that India succeeded to Czechoslovakia's seat.
- Due to being a pattern instead of an agreement or rule, some deviations occurred without comment. For example, during the above 1952 deadlock, no member of the General Assembly (including the Soviet Union) made any complaint about the Soviet bloc being potentially deprived of a seat. (In contrast, the Soviet Union frequently made complaints as early as 1947 when the Eastern European seat on the Security Council threatened to go to a non-Soviet-aligned member.) In the table below, deviations from the pattern are highlighted with a star.

| Year | Latin American seats | | | | Eastern European seats | | Commonwealth seat (1947-1965) | "Near and Far East" seats (Note: Various nonstandard, inconsistent names, including also "Near and Middle East", were used before Africa and Asia became Regional Groups. Sources published after the introduction of the Regional Groups retroactively name this group "Asia-Africa" or similar, but this name was not used at the creation of ECOSOC.) | | | Western European seats | | | Chinese seat |
|---|---|---|---|---|---|---|---|---|---|---|---|---|---|---|
| 1946 | Chile | Peru | Cuba | Colombia | Czechoslovakia | Ukrainian SSR | Yugoslavia* | Canada* | Lebanon | India | Norway | Belgium | Greece | Republic of China |
| 1947 | Chile | Peru | Cuba | Venezuela | Czechoslovakia | Byelorussian SSR | New Zealand | Canada* | Lebanon | India | Norway | Netherlands (Note: Belgium was elected to receive a 3-year term starting in 1946. However, as Greece's 1-year term was ending, Turkey and the Netherlands deadlocked as successor candidates. The deadlock was resolved when Belgium agreed to give the remaining 2 years of its term to the Netherlands.) | Turkey | Republic of China |
| 1948 | Chile | Peru | Brazil | Venezuela | Poland | Byelorussian SSR | New Zealand | Canada* | Lebanon | Australia (Note: In October 1947, India proposed the creation of a group named "Australasia and the Far East", which would match the third seat if including India and then-East Pakistan, but the proposal was not formally taken up.) | Denmark | Netherlands | Turkey | Republic of China |
| 1949 | Chile | Peru | Brazil | Venezuela | Poland | Byelorussian SSR | New Zealand | India | Lebanon | Australia | Denmark | Belgium | Turkey | Republic of China (Taiwan) |
| 1950 | Chile | Peru | Brazil | Mexico | Poland | Czechoslovakia | Canada | India | Pakistan | Australia | Denmark | Belgium | Iran (Note: Greece's seat has also been called a "Near East" seat, which would make Spain the exception instead of Iran.) | Republic of China (Taiwan) |
| 1951 | Chile | Peru | Uruguay | Mexico | Poland | Czechoslovakia | Canada | India | Pakistan | Philippines | Sweden | Belgium | Iran | Republic of China (Taiwan) |
| 1952 | Argentina | Cuba | Uruguay | Mexico | Poland | Czechoslovakia | Canada | Egypt | Pakistan | Philippines | Sweden | Belgium | Iran | Republic of China (Taiwan) |
| 1953 | Argentina | Cuba | Uruguay | Venezuela | Poland | Yugoslavia | Australia | Egypt | India | Philippines | Sweden | Belgium | Turkey | Republic of China (Taiwan) |
| 1954 | Argentina | Cuba | Ecuador | Venezuela | Czechoslovakia | Yugoslavia | Australia | Egypt | India | Pakistan | Norway | Belgium | Turkey | Republic of China (Taiwan) |
| 1955 | Argentina | Dominican Republic | Ecuador | Venezuela | Czechoslovakia | Yugoslavia | Australia | Egypt | India | Pakistan | Norway | Netherlands | Turkey | Republic of China (Taiwan) |
| 1956 | Argentina | Dominican Republic | Ecuador | Brazil | Czechoslovakia | Yugoslavia | Canada | Egypt | Indonesia | Pakistan | Norway | Netherlands | Greece | Republic of China (Taiwan) |
| 1957 | Argentina | Dominican Republic | Mexico | Brazil | Poland | Yugoslavia | Canada | Egypt | Indonesia | Pakistan | Finland | Netherlands | Greece | Republic of China (Taiwan) |
| 1958 | Chile | Costa Rica | Mexico | Brazil | Poland | Yugoslavia | Canada | Sudan (Note: Considered part of the Middle East due to being a member of the Arab League.) | Indonesia | Pakistan | Finland | Netherlands | Greece | Republic of China (Taiwan) |
| 1959 | Chile | Costa Rica | Mexico | Venezuela | Poland | Bulgaria | New Zealand | Sudan | Afghanistan | Pakistan | Finland | Netherlands | Spain | Republic of China (Taiwan) |
| 1960 | Chile | Costa Rica | Brazil | Venezuela | Poland | Bulgaria | New Zealand | Sudan | Afghanistan | Japan | Denmark | Netherlands | Spain | Republic of China (Taiwan) |
| 1961 | El Salvador | Uruguay | Brazil | Venezuela | Poland | Bulgaria | New Zealand | Jordan | Afghanistan | Japan | Denmark | Italy | Spain | Ethiopia* |
| 1962 | El Salvador | Uruguay | Brazil | Colombia | Poland | Yugoslavia | Australia | Jordan | India | Japan | Denmark | Italy | Senegal* | Ethiopia* |
| 1963 | El Salvador | Uruguay | Argentina | Colombia | Czechoslovakia | Yugoslavia | Australia | Jordan | India | Japan | Austria | Italy | Senegal* | Ethiopia* |
| 1964 | Chile | Ecuador | Argentina | Colombia | Czechoslovakia | Yugoslavia | Australia | Iraq | India | Japan | Austria | Luxembourg | Senegal* | Algeria* |
| 1965 | Chile | Ecuador | Argentina | Peru | Czechoslovakia | Romania | Canada | Iraq | Pakistan | Japan | Austria | Luxembourg | Gabon* | Algeria* |

The pattern broke at the end of 1960, after fifteen nations from sub-Saharan Africa joined the United Nations in the span of one month, increasing this unrepresented group from four to nineteen nations. The new members gave Africa, Asia, and Latin America together a commanding 66 out of 99 seats on the General Assembly. (Cyprus and Turkey caucused with Asia, while the Republic of China, Israel, and South Africa did not caucus with Asia or Africa.) In the election for the 1961 term, the Republic of China (Taiwan) failed to obtain a two-thirds majority for re-election, while Ethiopia received a two-thirds majority. Belgium, the Republic of China, and India deadlocked on the Netherlands' outgoing seat for fourteen rounds, which was left vacant for over four months, well into the 1961 term. After negotiations, all three members withdrew in place of Italy, with an agreement that next year, Spain's outgoing seat would go to a candidate from either Africa or Asia. This changed pattern would continue until 1965 when ECOSOC was expanded.

(Ten deadlocked rounds occurred on 9 December 1960, and three more occurred on 20 December 1960. A fourteenth round was scheduled for 13 April 1961, but was postponed by the President of the General Assembly with no objections while "the interested delegations and groups" negotiated. The fourteenth round occurred on 18 April 1961, electing Italy.)

== Membership by regional group ==
An amendment to the UN Charter in 1965 expanded the Economic and Social Council from 18 to 27 seats. A rule was also adopted to officially distribute the seats according to the Regional Groups. The 9-seat expansion added 5 African seats, 2 Asian seats, 1 Latin American seat, and 1 WEOG seat.

Another Charter amendment in 1973 further expanded the Economic and Social Council to 54 seats.

=== Table ===
The heading 3N + 1 refers to years that are a multiple of 3 plus one, and so on.

| | 1962–1965 | | | 1966–1973 | | | 1974–present | | |
| | 3N | 3N + 1 | 3N + 2 | 3N | 3N + 1 | 3N + 2 | 3N | 3N + 1 | 3N + 2 |
|---|---|---|---|---|---|---|---|---|---|
| African Group | 1 | 0 | 1 | 3 | 1 | 3 | 5 | 4 | 5 |
| Asia-Pacific Group (Note: Known as the Asian Group until 2011.) | 1 | 1 | 1 | 2 | 2 | 1 | 4 | 4 | 3 |
| Eastern European Group | 1 | 2 | 0 | 1 | 2 | 0 | 2 | 3 | 1 |
| Latin American and Caribbean Group (Note: Known as the Latin American Group until 1986.) | 1 | 1 | 2 | 1 | 2 | 2 | 3 | 3 | 4 |
| Western European and Others Group | 2 | 2 | 2 | 2 | 2 | 3 | 4 | 4 | 5 |

After the original 18 members of ECOSOC were elected, the General Assembly decided by a simple majority which six members would get 1-year, 2-year, and 3-year initial terms. This determined the seat staggering pattern (for example, the Eastern European seats were imbalanced because no Eastern European member was originally elected to a 3-year term).

After nine new seats were added in 1965 and members were elected to the seats, the General Assembly decided by a 60–44 vote that the President would randomly draw lots to determine which three would get 1-year, 2-year, and 3-year initial terms. This created an imbalance in the African Group.

After 27 new seats were added in 1973, the President consulted with the chairs of the Regional Groups and it was agreed that term lengths would be distributed evenly for each Regional Group. For example, since the Asian Group had six new seats, two would go to each term length. Since the Latin American and Caribbean Group had five new seats while the African Group had seven, the two Groups agreed to draw lots to determine the uneven distribution. As a result, the African Group would obtain three 1-year, two 2-year, and two 3-year initial terms for their new seats, while the Latin American and Caribbean Group would obtain one 1-year, two 2-year, and two 3-year initial terms. After the consultations, members were elected to the seats. The President then proposed to the General Assembly to draw lots again in order to assign term lengths to the specific members, with no objections.

=== African Group ===
Similar to on the Security Council, the African Union is in charge of distributing the African Group's seats based on the African Union's subregions, and the African Group is the only UN regional group to have such an internal seat system. Unlike on the Security Council, the distribution of ECOSOC seats is not strict, and may change if (for example) a subregion does not receive enough applicants in a given year. For example, at the end of 2004, the term of Libya ended and no member from Northern Africa applied. A member from Central Africa effectively replaced Libya. One year later, the term of the Republic of the Congo ended and the seat was given to Mauritania, undoing the 'imbalance' but changing the arrangement of seats (years that are a multiple of 3 now no longer elect any Northern African members).

Legend: Western Northern Central Southern Eastern

==== 1966–1978 ====
Prior to 1979, there were four subregions. An official African Union document from 1972 states a pattern of how many seats per region are to be doled out, but in practice this pattern changed over time and did not stabilize until approximately the late 1980s.

| Year | Western | | Northern | | Central | | Eastern |
|---|---|---|---|---|---|---|---|
| 1966 | Sierra Leone | Dahomey | Algeria | Morocco | Cameroon | Gabon | Tanzania |
| 1967 | Sierra Leone | Dahomey | Libya | Morocco | Cameroon | Gabon | Tanzania |
| 1968 | Sierra Leone | Upper Volta | Libya | Morocco | Chad | Congo (Brazzaville) | Tanzania |
| 1969 | Sierra Leone | Upper Volta | Libya | Sudan | Chad | Congo (Brazzaville) | Tanzania |
| 1970 | Ghana | Upper Volta | Tunisia | Sudan | Chad | Congo (Brazzaville) | Kenya |
| 1971 | Ghana | Niger | Tunisia | Sudan | Zaire | Madagascar | Kenya |
| 1972 | Ghana | Niger | Tunisia | Burundi | Zaire | Madagascar | Kenya |
| 1973 | Mali | Niger | Algeria | Burundi | Zaire | Madagascar | Uganda |

Formally, Liberia, Congo, and Zambia were elected in place of outgoing Niger, Zaire, and Madagascar, while Ivory Coast and Egypt were elected to newly created seats.

| Year | Western | | | | Northern | | | Central | | | Eastern | | | |
|---|---|---|---|---|---|---|---|---|---|---|---|---|---|---|
| 1974 | Liberia | Ivory Coast | Mali | Guinea | Senegal | Algeria | Egypt | Congo | Zaire (Note: Zaire lost re-election in November 1973, but was then elected to one of the newly created ECOSOC seats and drew a 1-year term. It then won re-election in this new seat in December 1974.) | Burundi | Uganda | Zambia | Ethiopia | Kenya |
| 1975 | Liberia | Ivory Coast | Mali | Guinea | Senegal | Algeria | Egypt | Congo | Zaire | Gabon | Uganda | Zambia | Ethiopia | Kenya |
| 1976 | Liberia | Ivory Coast | Nigeria | Togo | Tunisia | Algeria | Egypt | Congo | Zaire | Gabon | Uganda | Zambia | Ethiopia | Kenya |
| 1977 | Mauritania | Upper Volta | Nigeria | Togo | Tunisia | Algeria | Sudan | Rwanda | Zaire | Gabon | Uganda | Somalia | Ethiopia | Kenya |
| 1978 | Mauritania | Upper Volta | Nigeria | Togo | Tunisia | Algeria | Sudan | Rwanda | Cameroon | Central African Empire | Uganda | Somalia | Lesotho | Tanzania |

==== 1979–1996 ====
With five regions, the distribution of seats eventually stabilized into the following pattern: 4 seats to Western Africa, 3 seats to Eastern Africa, 2 seats to Northern Africa, 2 seats to Southern Africa, and 3 seats to Central Africa.

| Year | Western | | | | Eastern | | | Northern | | Southern | | Central | | |
|---|---|---|---|---|---|---|---|---|---|---|---|---|---|---|
| 1979 | Ghana | Senegal | Mauritania | Algeria | Tanzania | Somalia | Lesotho (Note: Changed regions while still on ECOSOC.) | Sudan | Morocco | Zambia | Upper Volta | Cameroon | Central African Empire | Rwanda |
| 1980 | Ghana | Senegal | Nigeria | Algeria | Tanzania | Ethiopia | Lesotho | Libya | Morocco | Zambia | Malawi | Cameroon | Central African Empire | Zaire |
| 1981 | Ghana | Senegal | Nigeria | Algeria | Kenya | Ethiopia | Sudan | Libya | Morocco | Zambia | Malawi | Cameroon | Burundi | Zaire |
| 1982 | Benin | Liberia | Nigeria | Mali | Kenya | Ethiopia | Sudan | Libya | Tunisia | Swaziland | Malawi | Cameroon | Burundi | Zaire |
| 1983 | Benin | Liberia | Sierra Leone | Mali | Kenya | Djibouti | Sudan | Algeria | Tunisia | Swaziland | Botswana | Cameroon | Burundi | Congo |
| 1984 | Benin | Liberia | Sierra Leone | Mali | Somalia | Djibouti | Uganda | Algeria | Tunisia | Swaziland | Botswana | Rwanda | Zaire | Congo |
| 1985 | Guinea | Nigeria | Sierra Leone | Senegal | Somalia | Djibouti | Uganda | Algeria | Morocco | Zimbabwe | Botswana | Rwanda | Zaire | Congo |
| 1986 | Guinea | Nigeria | Sierra Leone | Senegal | Somalia | Djibouti | Uganda | Egypt | Morocco | Zimbabwe | Mozambique | Rwanda | Zaire | Gabon |
| 1987 | Guinea | Nigeria | Sierra Leone | Senegal | Somalia | Djibouti | Sudan | Egypt | Morocco | Zimbabwe | Mozambique | Rwanda | Zaire | Gabon |
| 1988 | Guinea | Ghana | Sierra Leone | Liberia | Somalia | Djibouti | Sudan | Egypt | Libya | Lesotho | Mozambique | Rwanda | Zaire | Gabon |
| 1989 | Guinea | Ghana | Niger | Liberia | Somalia | Kenya | Sudan | Tunisia | Libya | Lesotho | Zambia | Rwanda | Zaire | Cameroon |
| 1990 | Guinea | Ghana | Niger | Liberia | Burkina Faso | Kenya | Algeria | Tunisia | Libya | Lesotho | Zambia | Rwanda | Zaire | Cameroon |
| 1991 | Guinea | Togo | Niger | Somalia | Burkina Faso | Kenya | Algeria | Tunisia | Morocco | Botswana | Zambia | Rwanda | Zaire | Cameroon |
| 1992 | Guinea | Togo | Benin | Somalia | Burkina Faso | Ethiopia | Algeria | Madagascar | Morocco | Botswana | Swaziland | Rwanda | Zaire | Angola |
| 1993 | Guinea | Togo | Benin | Somalia | Nigeria | Ethiopia | Libya | Madagascar | Morocco | Botswana | Swaziland | Gabon | Zaire | Angola |
| 1994 | Ghana | Senegal | Benin | Tanzania | Nigeria | Ethiopia | Libya | Madagascar | Egypt | Zimbabwe | Swaziland | Gabon | Zaire | Angola |
| 1995 | Ghana | Senegal | Côte d'Ivoire | Tanzania | Nigeria | Sudan | Libya | Uganda | Egypt | Zimbabwe | South Africa | Gabon | Zaire | Congo |
| 1996 | Ghana | Senegal | Côte d'Ivoire | Tanzania | Togo | Sudan | Tunisia | Uganda | Egypt | Zimbabwe | South Africa | Gabon | Central African Republic | Congo |

==== 1997–present ====
With Namibia, South Africa, and Angola all joining the Southern Africa region within a short period of time, the Southern Africa region gained a third seat, first at the expense of Northern Africa and then eventually Central Africa. (Angola's region change took place in 1995, so the first affected applications to the African Union took place in March 1996, in time for the October 1996 ECOSOC elections for the 1997 term.) The first years to match the modern seat distribution (4 seats to Western Africa, 2 seats to Northern Africa, 2 seats to Central Africa, 3 seats to Southern Africa, 3 seats to Eastern Africa) were 1998–1999. No changes to the seat distribution have occurred since 2006.

| Year | Western | | | | Northern | | Central | | Southern | | | Eastern | | |
|---|---|---|---|---|---|---|---|---|---|---|---|---|---|---|
| 1997 | Cape Verde | Gambia | Togo | Côte d'Ivoire | Congo | Zambia | Tunisia | Central African Republic | Gabon | South Africa | Mozambique | Djibouti | Sudan | Uganda |
| 1998 | Cape Verde | Gambia | Togo | Sierra Leone | Algeria | Zambia | Tunisia | Central African Republic | Gabon | Lesotho | Mozambique | Djibouti | Comoros | Mauritius |
| 1999 | Cape Verde | Gambia | Guinea-Bissau | Sierra Leone | Algeria | Zambia | Morocco | Democratic Republic of the Congo | Rwanda | Lesotho | Mozambique | Djibouti | Comoros | Mauritius |
| 2000 | Benin | Burkina Faso | Guinea-Bissau | Sierra Leone | Algeria | Cameroon | Morocco | Democratic Republic of the Congo | Rwanda | Lesotho | Angola | Sudan | Comoros | Mauritius |
| 2001 | Benin | Burkina Faso | Guinea-Bissau | Nigeria | Egypt | Cameroon | Morocco | Democratic Republic of the Congo | Rwanda | South Africa | Angola | Sudan | Ethiopia | Uganda |
| 2002 | Benin | Burkina Faso | Ghana | Nigeria | Egypt | Cameroon | Libya | Burundi | Zimbabwe | South Africa | Angola | Sudan | Ethiopia | Uganda |
| 2003 | Benin | Senegal | Ghana | Nigeria | Egypt | Congo | Libya | Burundi | Zimbabwe | South Africa | Mozambique | Kenya | Ethiopia | Uganda |
| 2004 | Benin | Senegal | Ghana | Nigeria | Tunisia | Congo | Libya | Burundi | Zimbabwe | Namibia | Mozambique | Kenya | Mauritius | Tanzania |
| 2005 | Benin | Senegal | Guinea | Nigeria | Tunisia | Congo | Chad | Democratic Republic of the Congo | South Africa | Namibia | Mozambique | Kenya | Mauritius | Tanzania |
| 2006 | Benin | Guinea-Bissau | Guinea | Nigeria | Tunisia | Mauritania | Chad | Democratic Republic of the Congo | South Africa | Namibia | Angola | Madagascar | Mauritius | Tanzania |
| 2007 | Benin | Guinea-Bissau | Guinea | Cape Verde | Algeria | Mauritania | Chad | Democratic Republic of the Congo | South Africa | Malawi | Angola | Madagascar | Somalia | Sudan |
| 2008 | Benin | Guinea-Bissau | Niger | Cape Verde | Algeria | Mauritania | Cameroon | Congo | Mozambique | Malawi | Angola | Madagascar | Somalia | Sudan |
| 2009 | Côte d'Ivoire | Guinea-Bissau | Niger | Cape Verde | Algeria | Morocco | Cameroon | Congo | Mozambique | Malawi | Namibia | Mauritius | Somalia | Sudan |
| 2010 | Côte d'Ivoire | Guinea-Bissau | Niger | Ghana | Egypt | Morocco | Cameroon | Congo | Mozambique | Zambia | Namibia | Mauritius | Comoros | Rwanda |
| 2011 | Côte d'Ivoire | Guinea-Bissau | Senegal | Ghana | Egypt | Morocco | Cameroon | Gabon | Malawi | Zambia | Namibia | Mauritius | Comoros | Rwanda |
| 2012 | Burkina Faso | Nigeria | Senegal | Ghana | Egypt | Libya | Cameroon | Gabon | Malawi | Zambia | Lesotho | Ethiopia | Comoros | Rwanda |
| 2013 | Burkina Faso | Nigeria | Senegal | Benin | Tunisia | Libya | Cameroon | Gabon | Malawi | South Africa | Lesotho | Ethiopia | Mauritius | Sudan |
| 2014 | Burkina Faso | Nigeria | Togo | Benin | Tunisia | Libya | Congo | Democratic Republic of the Congo | Botswana | South Africa | Lesotho | Ethiopia | Mauritius | Sudan |
| 2015 | Burkina Faso | Ghana | Togo | Benin | Tunisia | Mauritania | Congo | Democratic Republic of the Congo | Botswana | South Africa | Zimbabwe | Uganda | Mauritius | Sudan |
| 2016 | Burkina Faso | Ghana | Togo | Nigeria | Algeria | Mauritania | Congo | Democratic Republic of the Congo | Botswana | South Africa | Zimbabwe | Uganda | Rwanda | Somalia |
| 2017 | Burkina Faso | Ghana | Benin | Nigeria | Algeria | Mauritania | Cameroon | Chad | Eswatini | South Africa | Zimbabwe | Uganda | Rwanda | Somalia |
| 2018 | Togo | Ghana | Benin | Nigeria | Algeria | Morocco | Cameroon | Chad | Eswatini | South Africa | Malawi | Sudan | Rwanda | Somalia |
| 2019 | Togo | Ghana | Benin | Mali | Egypt | Morocco | Cameroon | Chad | Eswatini | Angola | Malawi | Sudan | Ethiopia | Kenya |
| 2020 | Togo | Ghana | Benin | Mali | Egypt | Morocco | Congo | Gabon | Botswana | Angola | Malawi | Sudan | Ethiopia | Kenya |
| 2021 | Liberia | Nigeria | Benin | Mali | Egypt | Libya | Congo | Gabon | Botswana | Angola | Zimbabwe | Madagascar | Ethiopia | Kenya |
| 2022 | Liberia | Nigeria | Benin | Cote d'Ivoire | Tunisia | Libya | Congo | Gabon | Botswana | Eswatini | Zimbabwe | Madagascar | Mauritius | Tanzania |
| 2023 | Liberia | Nigeria | Cabo Verde | Cote d'Ivoire | Tunisia | Libya | Cameroon | Equatorial Guinea | Botswana | Eswatini | Zimbabwe | Madagascar | Mauritius | Tanzania |
| 2024 | Senegal | Nigeria | Cabo Verde | Cote d'Ivoire | Tunisia | Mauritania | Cameroon | Equatorial Guinea | Botswana | Eswatini | Zambia | Kenya | Mauritius | Tanzania |
| 2025 | Senegal | Nigeria | Cabo Verde | Cote d'Ivoire | Algeria | Mauritania | Cameroon | Equatorial Guinea | Botswana | South Africa | Zambia | Kenya | Djibouti | Tanzania |

=== Asia-Pacific Group ===
In 1965, formally, the Philippines were elected in place of outgoing Japan, while Iran was elected to a newly created seat.

| 1966 | Philippines | Iran | India | Pakistan | Iraq |
| 1967 | Philippines | Iran | India | Pakistan | Kuwait |
| 1968 | Philippines | Iran | India | Japan | Kuwait |
| 1969 | Indonesia | Pakistan | India | Japan | Kuwait |
| 1970 | Indonesia | Pakistan | India | Japan | Ceylon |
| 1971 | Indonesia | Pakistan | Lebanon | Malaysia | Ceylon |
| 1972 | China | Japan | Lebanon | Malaysia | Ceylon |
| 1973 | China | Japan | Lebanon | Malaysia | Mongolia |

Formally, South Yemen and Thailand were elected in place of outgoing Lebanon and Malaysia, while Iran and Jordan were elected to newly created seats.

| 1974 | South Yemen | Thailand | Iran | Jordan | Mongolia | Fiji | Indonesia | India | Pakistan | Japan | China |
| 1975 | South Yemen | Thailand | Iran | Jordan | Mongolia | Fiji | Indonesia | North Yemen | Pakistan | Japan | China |
| 1976 | South Yemen | Thailand | Iran | Jordan | Afghanistan | Bangladesh | Malaysia | North Yemen | Pakistan | Japan | China |
| 1977 | Iraq | Philippines | Iran | Syria | Afghanistan | Bangladesh | Malaysia | North Yemen | Pakistan | Japan | China |
| 1978 | Iraq | Philippines | Iran | Syria | Afghanistan | Bangladesh | Malaysia | India | United Arab Emirates | Japan | China |
| 1979 | Iraq | Philippines | Iran | Syria | Cyprus | Pakistan | Indonesia | India | United Arab Emirates | Japan | China |
| 1980 | Iraq | Jordan | Nepal | Thailand | Cyprus | Pakistan | Indonesia | India | United Arab Emirates | Japan | China |
| 1981 | Iraq | Jordan | Nepal | Thailand | Cyprus | Pakistan | Indonesia | India | Bangladesh | Fiji | China |
| 1982 | Iraq | Jordan | Nepal | Thailand | Qatar | Pakistan | Japan | India | Bangladesh | Fiji | China |
| 1983 | Lebanon | Malaysia | Saudi Arabia | Thailand | Qatar | Pakistan | Japan | India | Bangladesh | Fiji | China |
| 1984 | Lebanon | Malaysia | Saudi Arabia | Thailand | Qatar | Pakistan | Japan | Indonesia | Papua New Guinea | Sri Lanka | China |
| 1985 | Lebanon | Malaysia | Saudi Arabia | Thailand | Bangladesh | India | Japan | Indonesia | Papua New Guinea | Sri Lanka | China |
| 1986 | Iraq | Pakistan | Philippines | Syria | Bangladesh | India | Japan | Indonesia | Papua New Guinea | Sri Lanka | China |
| 1987 | Iraq | Pakistan | Philippines | Syria | Bangladesh | India | Japan | Iran | Oman | Sri Lanka | China |
| 1988 | Iraq | Pakistan | Philippines | Syria | Saudi Arabia | India | Japan | Iran | Oman | Sri Lanka | China |
| 1989 | Iraq | Indonesia | Jordan | Thailand | Saudi Arabia | India | Japan | Iran | Oman | Sri Lanka | China |
| 1990 | Iraq | Indonesia | Jordan | Thailand | Saudi Arabia | India | Japan | Iran | Bahrain | Pakistan | China |
| 1991 | Iraq | Indonesia | Jordan | Thailand | Malaysia | Syria | Japan | Iran | Bahrain | Pakistan | China |
| 1992 | Bangladesh | India | Kuwait | Philippines | Malaysia | Syria | Japan | Iran | Bahrain | Pakistan | China |
| 1993 | Bangladesh | India | Kuwait | Philippines | Malaysia | Syria | Japan | Bhutan | South Korea | Sri Lanka | China |
| 1994 | Bangladesh | India | Kuwait | Philippines | Indonesia | Pakistan | Japan | Bhutan | South Korea | Sri Lanka | China |
| 1995 | Malaysia | India | Thailand | Philippines | Indonesia | Pakistan | Japan | Bhutan | South Korea | Sri Lanka | China |
| 1996 | Malaysia | India | Thailand | Philippines | Indonesia | Pakistan | Japan | Bangladesh | Jordan | Lebanon | China |
| 1997 | Malaysia | India | Thailand | Philippines | South Korea | Sri Lanka | Japan | Bangladesh | Jordan | Lebanon | China |
| 1998 | Oman | India | Pakistan | Viet Nam | South Korea | Sri Lanka | Japan | Bangladesh | Jordan | Lebanon | China |
| 1999 | Oman | India | Pakistan | Viet Nam | South Korea | Sri Lanka | Japan | Indonesia | Saudi Arabia | Syria | China |
| 2000 | Oman | India | Pakistan | Viet Nam | Bahrain | Fiji | Japan | Indonesia | Saudi Arabia | Syria | China |
| 2001 | Iran | Nepal | Pakistan | South Korea | Bahrain | Fiji | Japan | Indonesia | Saudi Arabia | Syria | China |
| 2002 | Iran | Nepal | Pakistan | South Korea | Bahrain | Fiji | Japan | Bhutan | India | Qatar | China |
| 2003 | Iran | Nepal | Pakistan | South Korea | Malaysia | Saudi Arabia | Japan | Bhutan | India | Qatar | China |
| 2004 | Bangladesh | Indonesia | United Arab Emirates | South Korea | Malaysia | Saudi Arabia | Japan | Bhutan | India | Qatar | China |
| 2005 | Bangladesh | Indonesia | United Arab Emirates | South Korea | Malaysia | Saudi Arabia | Japan | Pakistan | India | Thailand | China |
| 2006 | Bangladesh | Indonesia | United Arab Emirates | South Korea | Sri Lanka | Saudi Arabia | Japan | Pakistan | India | Thailand | China |
| 2007 | Iraq | Indonesia | Kazakhstan | Philippines | Sri Lanka | Saudi Arabia | Japan | Pakistan | India | Thailand | China |
| 2008 | Iraq | Indonesia | Kazakhstan | Philippines | Sri Lanka | Saudi Arabia | Japan | Pakistan | Malaysia | South Korea | China |
| 2009 | Iraq | Indonesia | Kazakhstan | Philippines | India | Saudi Arabia | Japan | Pakistan | Malaysia | South Korea | China |
| 2010 | Iraq | Bangladesh | Mongolia | Philippines | India | Saudi Arabia | Japan | Pakistan | Malaysia | South Korea | China |
| 2011 | Iraq | Bangladesh | Mongolia | Philippines | India | Saudi Arabia | Japan | Pakistan | Qatar | South Korea | China |
| 2012 | Iraq | Bangladesh | Mongolia | Philippines | India | Indonesia | Japan | Pakistan | Qatar | South Korea | China |
| 2013 | Kuwait | Kyrgyzstan | Nepal | Turkmenistan | India | Indonesia | Japan | Pakistan | Qatar | South Korea | China |
| 2014 | Kuwait | Kyrgyzstan | Nepal | Turkmenistan | India | Indonesia | Japan | Bangladesh | Kazakhstan | South Korea | China |
| 2015 | Kuwait | Kyrgyzstan | Nepal | Turkmenistan | India | Pakistan | Japan | Bangladesh | Kazakhstan | South Korea | China |
| 2016 | Afghanistan | Iraq | Lebanon | Viet Nam | India | Pakistan | Japan | Bangladesh | Kazakhstan | South Korea | China |
| 2017 | Afghanistan | Iraq | Lebanon | Viet Nam | India | Pakistan | Japan | Tajikistan | United Arab Emirates | South Korea | China |
| 2018 | Afghanistan | Iraq | Lebanon | Viet Nam | India | Philippines | Japan | Tajikistan | United Arab Emirates | South Korea | China |
| 2019 | Iran | Pakistan | Saudi Arabia | Turkmenistan | India | Philippines | Japan | Cambodia | Yemen | South Korea | China |
| 2020 | Iran | Pakistan | Saudi Arabia | Turkmenistan | India | Philippines | Japan | Bangladesh | Thailand | South Korea | China |
| 2021 | Iran | Pakistan | Saudi Arabia | Turkmenistan | Indonesia | Solomon Islands | Japan | Bangladesh | Thailand | South Korea | China |
| 2022 | Afghanistan (Note: The Islamic Republic of Afghanistan was elected in June 2021, and retains its UN seat despite losing control over its territory in September 2021.) | India | Kazakhstan | Oman | Indonesia | Solomon Islands | Japan | Bangladesh | Thailand | South Korea | China |
| 2023 | Afghanistan | India | Kazakhstan | Oman | Indonesia | Solomon Islands | Japan | Laos | Qatar | South Korea | China |
| 2024 | Afghanistan | India | Kazakhstan | Oman | Nepal | Pakistan | Japan | Laos | Qatar | South Korea | China |
| 2025 | Bangladesh | Saudi Arabia | Sri Lanka | Uzbekistan | Nepal | Pakistan | Japan | Laos | Qatar | South Korea | China |

=== Eastern European Group ===
| 1966 | Czechoslovakia | Romania | Soviet Union |
| 1967 | Czechoslovakia | Romania | Soviet Union |
| 1968 | Czechoslovakia | Bulgaria | Soviet Union |
| 1969 | Yugoslavia | Bulgaria | Soviet Union |
| 1970 | Yugoslavia | Bulgaria | Soviet Union |
| 1971 | Yugoslavia | Hungary | Soviet Union |
| 1972 | Poland | Hungary | Soviet Union |
| 1973 | Poland | Hungary | Soviet Union |

Formally, Romania was elected in place of outgoing Hungary, while East Germany was elected to a newly created seat.

| 1974 | Romania | East Germany | Yugoslavia | Poland | Czechoslovakia | Soviet Union |
| 1975 | Romania | East Germany | Yugoslavia | Bulgaria | Czechoslovakia | Soviet Union |
| 1976 | Romania | East Germany | Yugoslavia | Bulgaria | Czechoslovakia | Soviet Union |
| 1977 | Poland | Ukrainian SSR | Yugoslavia | Bulgaria | Czechoslovakia | Soviet Union |
| 1978 | Poland | Ukrainian SSR | Yugoslavia | Hungary | Romania | Soviet Union |
| 1979 | Poland | Ukrainian SSR | East Germany | Hungary | Romania | Soviet Union |
| 1980 | Bulgaria | Yugoslavia | East Germany | Hungary | Romania | Soviet Union |
| 1981 | Bulgaria | Yugoslavia | East Germany | Byelorussian SSR | Poland | Soviet Union |
| 1982 | Bulgaria | Yugoslavia | Romania | Byelorussian SSR | Poland | Soviet Union |
| 1983 | Bulgaria | East Germany | Romania | Byelorussian SSR | Poland | Soviet Union |
| 1984 | Bulgaria | East Germany | Romania | Yugoslavia | Poland | Soviet Union |
| 1985 | Bulgaria | East Germany | Romania | Yugoslavia | Poland | Soviet Union |
| 1986 | Byelorussian SSR | East Germany | Romania | Yugoslavia | Poland | Soviet Union |
| 1987 | Byelorussian SSR | East Germany | Romania | Bulgaria | Poland | Soviet Union |
| 1988 | Byelorussian SSR | East Germany | Yugoslavia (Note: Serbia and Montenegro occupied this seat under the former Yugoslav flag from the breakup of Yugoslavia until its removal by the UN General Assembly on 5 May 1993.) | Bulgaria | Poland | Soviet Union |
| 1989 | Czechoslovakia | Ukrainian SSR | Yugoslavia | Bulgaria | Poland | Soviet Union |
| 1990 | Czechoslovakia | Ukrainian SSR | Yugoslavia | Bulgaria | East Germany (Note: East Germany ceased to exist ten months into its term. In a special election in November 1990, Romania was elected in its place and was seated immediately (before the other members which were seated January 1991).) | Soviet Union |
| 1991 | Czechoslovakia | Ukrainian SSR | Yugoslavia | Bulgaria | Romania | Soviet Union |
| 1992 | Belarus | Poland | Yugoslavia | Bulgaria | Romania | Soviet Union |
| 1993 | Belarus | Poland | Yugoslavia | Ukraine | Romania | Russia (Note: The Soviet Union was (re-)elected to a 3-year term starting in 1990. Russia first appeared on ballots for the 1993 term.) |
| 1994 | Belarus | Poland | Bulgaria | Ukraine | Romania | Russia |
| 1995 | Belarus | Poland | Bulgaria | Ukraine | Romania | Russia |
| 1996 | Belarus | Poland | Bulgaria | Czech Republic | Romania | Russia |
| 1997 | Belarus | Poland | Latvia | Czech Republic | Romania | Russia |
| 1998 | Belarus | Poland | Latvia | Czech Republic | Romania | Russia |
| 1999 | Belarus | Poland | Latvia | Czech Republic | Bulgaria | Russia |
| 2000 | Belarus | Poland | Croatia | Czech Republic | Bulgaria | Russia |
| 2001 | Georgia | Romania | Croatia | Czech Republic | Bulgaria | Russia |
| 2002 | Georgia | Romania | Croatia | Hungary | Ukraine | Russia |
| 2003 | Georgia | Romania | Azerbaijan | Hungary | Ukraine | Russia |
| 2004 | Armenia | Poland | Azerbaijan | Hungary | Ukraine | Russia |
| 2005 | Armenia | Poland | Azerbaijan | Albania | Lithuania | Russia |
| 2006 | Armenia | Poland | Czech Republic | Albania | Lithuania | Russia |
| 2007 | Belarus | Romania | Czech Republic | Albania | Lithuania | Russia |
| 2008 | Belarus | Romania | Czech Republic | Moldova | Poland | Russia |
| 2009 | Belarus | Romania | Estonia | Moldova | Poland | Russia |
| 2010 | Slovakia | Ukraine | Estonia | Moldova | Poland | Russia |
| 2011 | Slovakia | Ukraine | Estonia | Hungary | Latvia | Russia |
| 2012 | Slovakia | Ukraine | Belarus | Bulgaria | Latvia | Russia |
| 2013 | Albania | Croatia | Belarus | Bulgaria | Latvia | Russia |
| 2014 | Albania | Croatia | Belarus | Georgia | Serbia | Russia |
| 2015 | Albania | Croatia | Estonia | Georgia | Serbia | Russia |
| 2016 | Czech Republic | Moldova | Estonia | Georgia | Serbia | Russia |
| 2017 | Czech Republic | Moldova | Estonia | Azerbaijan | Bosnia and Herzegovina | Russia |
| 2018 | Czech Republic | Moldova | Belarus | Azerbaijan | Romania | Russia |
| 2019 | Armenia | Ukraine | Belarus | Azerbaijan | Romania | Russia |
| 2020 | Armenia | Ukraine | Belarus | Latvia | Montenegro | Russia |
| 2021 | Armenia | Ukraine | Bulgaria | Latvia | Montenegro | Russia |
| 2022 | Croatia | Czechia | Bulgaria | Latvia | Montenegro | Russia |
| 2023 | Croatia | Czechia | Bulgaria | Slovakia | Slovenia | Vacant (Note: North Macedonia and Russia have deadlocked over this seat for twenty-five rounds of balloting, with neither candidate able to obtain a two-thirds majority. This is the only vacancy to have lasted more than a year. (Six rounds took place on 10 June 2022, five rounds took place on 16 June 2022, five rounds took place on 11 July 2022, three rounds took place on 2 September 2022, three rounds took place on 20 December 2022, one round took place on 8 June 2023, one round took place on 5 December 2023, and one round took place on 7 June 2024.)) |
| 2024 | Croatia | Czechia | Poland | Slovakia | Slovenia | Vacant |
| 2025 | Armenia | Azerbaijan | Poland | Slovakia | Slovenia | Vacant |

=== Latin American and Caribbean Group ===
In 1965, formally, Panama was elected in place of outgoing Argentina, while Venezuela was elected to a newly created seat.

| 1966 | Panama | Venezuela | Peru | Chile | Ecuador |
| 1967 | Panama | Venezuela | Peru | Guatemala | Mexico |
| 1968 | Panama | Venezuela | Argentina | Guatemala | Mexico |
| 1969 | Jamaica | Uruguay | Argentina | Guatemala | Mexico |
| 1970 | Jamaica | Uruguay | Argentina | Brazil | Peru |
| 1971 | Jamaica | Uruguay | Haiti | Brazil | Peru |
| 1972 | Bolivia | Chile | Haiti | Brazil | Peru |
| 1973 | Bolivia | Chile | Haiti | Brazil | Trinidad and Tobago |

Formally, Mexico was elected in place of outgoing Haiti, while Colombia and Jamaica were elected to newly created seats.

| 1974 | Mexico | Colombia | Jamaica | Brazil | Trinidad and Tobago | Guatemala | Venezuela | Bolivia | Chile | Argentina |
| 1975 | Mexico | Colombia | Jamaica | Brazil | Trinidad and Tobago | Guatemala | Venezuela | Ecuador | Peru | Argentina |
| 1976 | Mexico | Colombia | Jamaica | Brazil | Bolivia | Cuba | Venezuela | Ecuador | Peru | Argentina |
| 1977 | Mexico | Colombia | Jamaica | Brazil | Bolivia | Cuba | Venezuela | Ecuador | Peru | Argentina |
| 1978 | Mexico | Colombia | Jamaica | Brazil | Bolivia | Cuba | Venezuela | Dominican Republic | Trinidad and Tobago | Argentina |
| 1979 | Mexico | Colombia | Jamaica | Brazil | Barbados | Ecuador | Venezuela | Dominican Republic | Trinidad and Tobago | Argentina |
| 1980 | Mexico | Bahamas | Chile | Brazil | Barbados | Ecuador | Venezuela | Dominican Republic | Trinidad and Tobago | Argentina |
| 1981 | Mexico | Bahamas | Chile | Brazil | Barbados | Ecuador | Venezuela | Nicaragua | Peru | Argentina |
| 1982 | Mexico | Bahamas | Chile | Brazil | Colombia | Saint Lucia | Venezuela | Nicaragua | Peru | Argentina |
| 1983 | Mexico | Ecuador | Suriname | Brazil | Colombia | Saint Lucia | Venezuela | Nicaragua | Peru | Argentina |
| 1984 | Mexico | Ecuador | Suriname | Brazil | Colombia | Saint Lucia | Venezuela | Costa Rica | Guyana | Argentina |
| 1985 | Mexico | Ecuador | Suriname | Brazil | Colombia | Haiti | Venezuela | Costa Rica | Guyana | Argentina |
| 1986 | Jamaica | Panama | Peru | Brazil | Colombia | Haiti | Venezuela | Costa Rica | Guyana | Argentina |
| 1987 | Jamaica | Panama | Peru | Brazil | Colombia | Haiti | Venezuela | Belize | Bolivia | Uruguay |
| 1988 | Jamaica | Panama | Peru | Cuba | Colombia | Trinidad and Tobago | Venezuela | Belize | Bolivia | Uruguay |
| 1989 | Bahamas | Brazil | Nicaragua | Cuba | Colombia | Trinidad and Tobago | Venezuela | Belize | Bolivia | Uruguay |
| 1990 | Bahamas | Brazil | Nicaragua | Cuba | Colombia | Trinidad and Tobago | Venezuela | Ecuador | Jamaica | Mexico |
| 1991 | Bahamas | Brazil | Nicaragua | Argentina | Chile | Trinidad and Tobago | Peru | Ecuador | Jamaica | Mexico |
| 1992 | Colombia | Brazil | Suriname | Argentina | Chile | Trinidad and Tobago | Peru | Ecuador | Jamaica | Mexico |
| 1993 | Colombia | Brazil | Suriname | Argentina | Chile | Trinidad and Tobago | Peru | Bahamas | Cuba | Mexico |
| 1994 | Colombia | Brazil | Suriname | Costa Rica | Chile | Paraguay | Venezuela | Bahamas | Cuba | Mexico |
| 1995 | Colombia | Brazil | Jamaica | Costa Rica | Chile | Paraguay | Venezuela | Bahamas | Cuba | Mexico |
| 1996 | Colombia | Brazil | Jamaica | Costa Rica | Chile | Paraguay | Venezuela | Argentina | Guyana | Nicaragua |
| 1997 | Colombia | Brazil | Jamaica | Cuba | Chile | El Salvador | Mexico | Argentina | Guyana | Nicaragua |
| 1998 | Colombia | Brazil | Saint Lucia | Cuba | Chile | El Salvador | Mexico | Argentina | Guyana | Nicaragua |
| 1999 | Colombia | Brazil | Saint Lucia | Cuba | Chile | El Salvador | Mexico | Bolivia | Honduras | Venezuela |
| 2000 | Colombia | Brazil | Saint Lucia | Cuba | Costa Rica | Suriname | Mexico | Bolivia | Honduras | Venezuela |
| 2001 | Argentina | Brazil | Peru | Cuba | Costa Rica | Suriname | Mexico | Bolivia | Honduras | Venezuela |
| 2002 | Argentina | Brazil | Peru | Cuba | Costa Rica | Suriname | Mexico | Chile | El Salvador | Guatemala |
| 2003 | Argentina | Brazil | Peru | Cuba | Ecuador | Jamaica | Nicaragua | Chile | El Salvador | Guatemala |
| 2004 | Belize | Colombia | Panama | Cuba | Ecuador | Jamaica | Nicaragua | Chile | El Salvador | Guatemala |
| 2005 | Belize | Colombia | Panama | Cuba | Ecuador | Jamaica | Nicaragua | Brazil | Costa Rica | Mexico |
| 2006 | Belize | Colombia | Panama | Cuba | Guyana | Haiti | Paraguay | Brazil | Costa Rica | Mexico |
| 2007 | Barbados | Bolivia | El Salvador | Cuba | Guyana | Haiti | Paraguay | Brazil | Costa Rica | Mexico |
| 2008 | Barbados | Bolivia | El Salvador | Cuba | Guyana | Haiti | Paraguay | Brazil | Saint Lucia | Uruguay |
| 2009 | Barbados | Bolivia | El Salvador | Guatemala | Peru | Saint Kitts and Nevis | Venezuela | Brazil | Saint Lucia | Uruguay |
| 2010 | Argentina | Bahamas | Chile | Guatemala | Peru | Saint Kitts and Nevis | Venezuela | Brazil | Saint Lucia | Uruguay |
| 2011 | Argentina | Bahamas | Chile | Guatemala | Peru | Saint Kitts and Nevis | Venezuela | Ecuador | Mexico | Nicaragua |
| 2012 | Argentina | Bahamas | Chile | Brazil | Cuba | Dominican Republic | El Salvador | Ecuador | Mexico | Nicaragua |
| 2013 | Bolivia | Colombia | Haiti | Brazil | Cuba | Dominican Republic | El Salvador | Ecuador | Mexico | Nicaragua |
| 2014 | Bolivia | Colombia | Haiti | Brazil | Cuba | Dominican Republic | El Salvador | Antigua and Barbuda | Guatemala | Panama |
| 2015 | Bolivia | Colombia | Haiti | Brazil | Argentina | Honduras | Trinidad and Tobago | Antigua and Barbuda | Guatemala | Panama |
| 2016 | Chile | Guyana | Peru | Brazil | Argentina | Honduras | Trinidad and Tobago | Antigua and Barbuda | Guatemala | Panama |
| 2017 | Chile | Guyana | Peru | Brazil | Argentina | Honduras | Trinidad and Tobago | Colombia | Saint Vincent and the Grenadines | Venezuela |
| 2018 | Chile | Guyana | Peru | Ecuador | El Salvador | Mexico | Uruguay | Colombia | Saint Vincent and the Grenadines | Venezuela |
| 2019 | Brazil | Jamaica | Paraguay | Ecuador | El Salvador | Mexico | Uruguay | Colombia | Saint Vincent and the Grenadines | Venezuela |
| 2020 | Brazil | Jamaica | Paraguay | Ecuador | El Salvador | Mexico | Uruguay | Colombia | Nicaragua | Panama |
| 2021 | Brazil | Jamaica | Paraguay | Argentina | Bolivia | Mexico | Guatemala | Colombia | Nicaragua | Panama |
| 2022 | Belize | Chile | Peru | Argentina | Bolivia | Mexico | Guatemala | Colombia | Nicaragua | Panama |
| 2023 | Belize | Chile | Peru | Argentina | Bolivia | Mexico | Guatemala | Colombia | Brazil | Costa Rica |
| 2024 | Belize | Chile | Peru | Haiti | Paraguay | Suriname | Uruguay | Colombia | Brazil | Costa Rica |
| 2025 | Antigua and Barbuda | Dominican Republic | Mexico | Haiti | Paraguay | Suriname | Uruguay | Colombia | Brazil | Costa Rica |

=== Western European and Others Group ===
The Western European and Others Group contains three caucusing subgroups (Benelux, the Nordic countries, and CANZ). In practice, since 1976, this has created seats that 'belong' to a subgroup with few exceptions, as well as seats that never go to any of the subgroups. Iceland joined the Nordic caucus in 1998.

Since 2000, the Group has engaged in a large number of special elections, with members voluntarily giving part of their 3-year term to another member. In many cases, the newly elected member then runs for re-election, only to again give part of their new 3-year term to another member, creating an 'offset' effect where members' terms do not align with the usual cycle. Below, all re-elections are shown as separate table cells. To prevent distorting or stretching the table, special elections resulting in 1-year terms are abbreviated to the country's ISO 3166-1 alpha-3 code.

| 1966 | Sweden | United Kingdom | Canada | United States | France | Luxembourg | Greece |
| 1967 | Sweden | United Kingdom | Canada | United States | France | Belgium | Turkey |
| 1968 | Sweden | United Kingdom | Ireland | United States | France | Belgium | Turkey |
| 1969 | Norway | United Kingdom | Ireland | United States | France | Belgium | Turkey |
| 1970 | Norway | United Kingdom | Ireland | United States | France | Italy | Greece |
| 1971 | Norway | United Kingdom | New Zealand | United States | France | Italy | Greece |
| 1972 | Finland | United Kingdom | New Zealand | United States | France | Italy | Greece |
| 1973 | Finland | United Kingdom | New Zealand | United States | France | Netherlands | Spain |

Formally, Australia was elected in place of outgoing New Zealand, while Belgium and Italy were elected to newly created seats.

| 1974 | Australia | Belgium | Italy | United States | France | Spain | Turkey | Netherlands | West Germany | Finland | Sweden | Canada | United Kingdom |
| 1975 | Australia | Belgium | Italy | United States | France | Spain | Turkey | Netherlands | West Germany | Denmark | Norway | Canada | United Kingdom |
| 1976 | Australia | Belgium | Italy | United States | France | Greece | Portugal | Austria | West Germany | Denmark | Norway | Canada | United Kingdom |
| 1977 | New Zealand | Netherlands | Italy | United States | France | Greece | Portugal | Austria | West Germany | Denmark | Norway | Canada | United Kingdom |
| 1978 | New Zealand | Netherlands | Italy | United States | France | Greece | Portugal | Austria | West Germany | Finland | Sweden | Malta | United Kingdom |
| 1979 | New Zealand | Netherlands | Italy | United States | France | Spain | Turkey | Ireland | West Germany | Finland | Sweden | Malta | United Kingdom |
| 1980 | Australia | Belgium | Italy | United States | France | Spain | Turkey | Ireland | West Germany | Finland | Sweden | Malta | United Kingdom |
| 1981 | Australia | Belgium | Italy | United States | France | Spain | Turkey | Ireland | West Germany | Denmark | Norway | Canada | United Kingdom |
| 1982 | Australia | Belgium | Italy | United States | France | Greece | Portugal | Austria | West Germany | Denmark | Norway | Canada | United Kingdom |
| 1983 | New Zealand | Luxembourg | Netherlands | United States | France | Greece | Portugal | Austria | West Germany | Denmark | Norway | Canada | United Kingdom |
| 1984 | New Zealand | Luxembourg | Netherlands | United States | France | Greece | Portugal | Austria | West Germany | Finland | Sweden | Canada | United Kingdom |
| 1985 | New Zealand | Luxembourg | Netherlands | United States | France | Spain | Turkey | Iceland | West Germany | Finland | Sweden | Canada | United Kingdom |
| 1986 | Australia | Belgium | Italy | United States | France | Spain | Turkey | Iceland | West Germany | Finland | Sweden | Canada | United Kingdom |
| 1987 | Australia | Belgium | Italy | United States | France | Spain | Turkey | Iceland | West Germany | Denmark | Norway | Canada | United Kingdom |
| 1988 | Australia | Belgium | Italy | United States | France | Greece | Portugal | Ireland | West Germany | Denmark | Norway | Canada | United Kingdom |
| 1989 | New Zealand | Netherlands | Italy | United States | France | Greece | Portugal | Ireland | West Germany | Denmark | Norway | Canada | United Kingdom |
| 1990 | New Zealand | Netherlands | Italy | United States | France | Greece | Portugal | Ireland | West Germany | Finland | Sweden | Canada | United Kingdom |
| 1991 | New Zealand | Netherlands | Italy | United States | France | Spain | Turkey | Austria | Germany | Finland | Sweden | Canada | United Kingdom |
| 1992 | Australia | Belgium | Italy | United States | France | Spain | Turkey | Austria | Germany | Finland | Sweden | Canada | United Kingdom |
| 1993 | Australia | Belgium | Italy | United States | France | Spain | Turkey | Austria | Germany | Denmark | Norway | Canada | United Kingdom |
| 1994 | Australia | Belgium | Italy | United States | France | Greece | Portugal | Ireland | Germany | Denmark | Norway | Canada | United Kingdom |
| 1995 | Australia | Luxembourg | Netherlands | United States | France | Greece | Portugal | Ireland | Germany | Denmark | Norway | Canada | United Kingdom |
| 1996 | Australia | Luxembourg | Netherlands | United States | France | Greece | Portugal | Ireland | Germany | Finland | Sweden | Canada | United Kingdom |
| 1997 | Australia | Luxembourg | Netherlands | United States | France | Spain | Turkey | Iceland | Germany | Finland | Sweden | Canada | United Kingdom |
| 1998 | New Zealand | Belgium | Italy | United States | France | Spain | Turkey | Iceland | Germany | Finland | Sweden | Canada | United Kingdom |
| 1999 | New Zealand | Belgium | Italy | United States | France | Spain | Turkey | Iceland | Germany | Denmark | Norway | Canada | United Kingdom |
| 2000 | New Zealand | Belgium | Italy | United States | France | GRE | Portugal | Austria | Germany | Denmark | Norway | Canada | United Kingdom |
| 2001 | Andorra | Netherlands | Italy | United States | France | Malta | Portugal | Austria | Germany | Denmark | Norway | Canada | United Kingdom |
| 2002 | Andorra | Netherlands | Italy | United States | France | Malta | ESP | Austria | Germany | Finland | Sweden | Australia | United Kingdom |
| 2003 | Andorra | Netherlands | Italy | United States | France | Greece | POR | Ireland | Germany | Finland | Sweden | Australia | United Kingdom |
| 2004 | Canada | Belgium | Italy | United States | France | Greece | Turkey | Ireland | Germany | Finland | Sweden | Australia | United Kingdom |
| 2005 | Canada | Belgium | Italy | United States | France | ESP | Turkey | Ireland | Germany | Denmark | Iceland | Australia | United Kingdom |
| 2006 | Canada | Belgium | Italy | United States | France | ESP | TUR | Austria | Germany | Denmark | Iceland | Australia | United Kingdom |
| 2007 | Canada | Luxembourg | Netherlands | United States | France | Portugal | Greece | Austria | Germany | Denmark | Iceland | NZL | United Kingdom |
| 2008 | Canada | Luxembourg | Netherlands | United States | France | Portugal | Greece | Austria | LIE | Sweden | ISL | New Zealand | United Kingdom |
| 2009 | Canada | Luxembourg | Netherlands | United States | France | PRT | GRC | Germany | Liechtenstein | Sweden | Norway | New Zealand | United Kingdom |
| 2010 | Canada | Belgium | Italy | United States | France | TUR | Malta | Germany | Liechtenstein | FIN | Norway | AUS | United Kingdom |
| 2011 | Canada | Belgium | Italy | United States | France | ESP | Malta | Germany | SUI | Finland | NOR | Australia | United Kingdom |
| 2012 | Canada | NED | Italy | United States | France | Spain | Turkey | GER | Ireland | Finland | SUI (Note: Switzerland was not re-elected; Norway gave the last two years of its term to Switzerland just before the regular election. (Switzerland then gave the rest of its term to Sweden a year later.)) | Australia | United Kingdom |
| 2013 | Canada | NED | San Marino | United States | France | Spain | Turkey | Austria | Ireland | DEN | SWE | NZL | United Kingdom |
| 2014 | Canada | Italy | San Marino | United States | France | POR | GRE | Austria | GER | DEN | Sweden | NZL | United Kingdom |
| 2015 | AUS | Italy | San Marino | United States | France | Portugal | Greece | AUT | Germany | Finland | Sweden | Switzerland | United Kingdom |
| 2016 | Australia | Italy | Belgium | United States | France | Portugal | Greece | Ireland | Germany | Finland | Sweden | Switzerland | United Kingdom |
| 2017 | Australia | Italy | Belgium | United States | France | ESP | TUR | Ireland | Germany | Norway | SWE | Andorra | United Kingdom |
| 2018 | CAN | Italy | Belgium | United States | France | ESP | Turkey | Ireland | Germany | Norway | Denmark | Andorra | United Kingdom |
| 2019 | Canada | Luxembourg | Netherlands | United States | France | Malta | Turkey | Ireland | Germany | Norway | Denmark | Andorra | United Kingdom |
| 2020 | Canada | Luxembourg | Netherlands | United States | France | Malta | ESP | Ireland | Germany | Norway | Finland | Australia | Switzerland |
| 2021 | Canada | Luxembourg | Netherlands | United States | France | United Kingdom | Portugal | Austria | GER | Norway | Finland | Australia | Switzerland |
| 2022 | Canada | Belgium | Italy | United States | France | United Kingdom | Portugal | Austria | Israel | FIN (Note: In June 2021, Finland gave the last year of its term to Denmark. In December 2021, Norway gave the last year of its term to Finland.) | DEN | NZL | GRE |
| 2023 | Canada | Belgium | Italy | United States | France | United Kingdom | Portugal | LIE | Israel | Sweden | Denmark | New Zealand | GRE |
| 2024 | Canada | Belgium | Italy | United States | France | United Kingdom | Spain | Liechtenstein | GER | Sweden | Denmark | New Zealand | Turkey |
| 2025 | Canada | Netherlands | Italy | Switzerland | France | United Kingdom | Spain | Liechtenstein | Austria | Sweden | FIN | AUS | Turkey |

== List by number of years as ECOSOC member ==
A total of 176 United Nations member states have been elected to ECOSOC. Out of these, 5 have ceased to exist and 1 has been expelled, leaving a total of 170 members. Combined with the 23 current members that have never been elected to ECOSOC (see #Non-members below), these make up the 193 current members of the UN.

UNSC permanent member
Current elected member (2025)
Former United Nations member

| Years | Country | First Year | Most Recent Year | Regional Group | Notes |
|---|---|---|---|---|---|
| 80 | France | 1946 | 2025 | WEOG | UNSC permanent member |
| 79 | United Kingdom | 1946 | 2025 | WEOG | UNSC permanent member |
| 79 | United States | 1946 | 2024 | WEOG | UNSC permanent member, currently not on ECOSOC |
| 54 | China | 1972 | 2025 | Asia-Pacific | UNSC permanent member |
| 15 | Republic of China | 1946 | 1960 | None | Former UNSC permanent member |
| 46 | Soviet Union | 1946 | 1991 | E. European | Former UNSC permanent member |
| 31 | Russia | 1992 | 2022 | E. European | UNSC permanent member, currently not on ECOSOC |
| 62 | Japan | 1960 | 2025 | Asia-Pacific | |
| 60 | Brazil | 1948 | 2025 | GRULAC | |
| 59 | India | 1946 | 2024 | Asia-Pacific | Includes approximately 2 years as British India |
| 57 | Pakistan | 1950 | 2025 | Asia-Pacific | |
| 56 | Canada | 1946 | 2025 | WEOG | |
| 47 | Germany | 1974 | 2024 | WEOG | Includes 17 years as West Germany, but excludes 13 years as East Germany |
| 46 | Mexico | 1950 | 2025 | GRULAC | |
| 45 | Italy | 1961 | 2025 | WEOG | |
| 44 | Poland | 1948 | 2025 | E. European | |
| 43 | Argentina | 1952 | 2023 | GRULAC | |
| 43 | Colombia | 1946 | 2025 | GRULAC | |
| 41 | Venezuela | 1947 | 2019 | GRULAC | |
| 39 | Chile | 1946 | 2024 | GRULAC | |
| 38 | Australia | 1948 | 2025 | WEOG | |
| 36 | Belgium | 1946 | 2024 | WEOG | |
| 36 | Peru | 1946 | 2024 | GRULAC | |
| 35 | Indonesia | 1956 | 2023 | Asia-Pacific | |
| 35 | Netherlands | 1947 | 2025 | WEOG | |
| 34 | Turkey | 1947 | 2025 | WEOG | |
| 32 | Bulgaria | 1959 | 2023 | E. European | |
| 32 | Sweden | 1951 | 2025 | WEOG | |
| 31 | Democratic Republic of the Congo | 1971 | 2016 | African | |
| 31 | Denmark | 1948 | 2024 | WEOG | |
| 31 | Greece | 1946 | 2023 | WEOG | |
| 31 | Norway | 1946 | 2021 | WEOG | |
| 31 | Romania | 1965 | 2019 | E. European | |
| 30 | Finland | 1957 | 2025 | WEOG | |
| 30 | South Korea | 1993 | 2025 | Asia-Pacific | |
| 30 | Sudan | 1958 | 2020 | African | |
| 30 | Yugoslavia | 1946 | 1993 | E. European | Includes 1 year as the Federal Republic of Yugoslavia |
| 29 | Cuba | 1946 | 2014 | GRULAC | |
| 29 | New Zealand | 1947 | 2024 | WEOG | |
| 29 | Nigeria | 1976 | 2025 | African | |
| 29 | Spain | 1959 | 2025 | WEOG | |
| 28 | Algeria | 1964 | 2025 | African | |
| 28 | Bangladesh | 1976 | 2025 | Asia-Pacific | |
| 27 | Belarus | 1947 | 2020 | E. European | Includes 9 years as the Byelorussian SSR |
| 27 | Ecuador | 1954 | 2020 | GRULAC | |
| 27 | Philippines | 1951 | 2020 | Asia-Pacific | |
| 26 | Benin | 1966 | 2022 | African | |
| 26 | Cameroon | 1966 | 2025 | African | |
| 24 | Austria | 1963 | 2025 | WEOG | |
| 24 | Congo | 1968 | 2022 | African | |
| 24 | Egypt | 1952 | 2021 | African | |
| 24 | Ghana | 1970 | 2020 | African | |
| 24 | Iran | 1950 | 2021 | Asia-Pacific | |
| 24 | Iraq | 1964 | 2018 | Asia-Pacific | |
| 24 | Jamaica | 1969 | 2021 | GRULAC | |
| 24 | Portugal | 1976 | 2023 | WEOG | |
| 24 | Tunisia | 1970 | 2024 | African | |
| 22 | Ethiopia | 1961 | 2021 | African | |
| 22 | Ireland | 1968 | 2020 | WEOG | |
| 22 | Saudi Arabia | 1983 | 2025 | Asia-Pacific | |
| 22 | Senegal | 1962 | 2025 | African | |
| 21 | Bolivia | 1972 | 2023 | GRULAC | |
| 21 | Czechoslovakia | 1946 | 1991 | E. European | |
| 21 | Gabon | 1965 | 2022 | African | |
| 21 | Kenya | 1970 | 2025 | African | |
| 21 | Libya | 1967 | 2023 | African | |
| 21 | Malaysia | 1971 | 2010 | Asia-Pacific | |
| 21 | Morocco | 1966 | 2020 | African | |
| 21 | Rwanda | 1977 | 2018 | African | |
| 21 | Thailand | 1974 | 2022 | Asia-Pacific | |
| 20 | Uruguay | 1951 | 2025 | GRULAC | |
| 19 | Sri Lanka | 1970 | 2025 | Asia-Pacific | |
| 19 | Ukraine | 1946 | 2021 | E. European | Includes 7 years as the Ukrainian SSR |
| 18 | Burkina Faso | 1968 | 2017 | African | |
| 18 | Costa Rica | 1958 | 2025 | GRULAC | |
| 18 | El Salvador | 1961 | 2020 | GRULAC | |
| 18 | Nicaragua | 1981 | 2022 | GRULAC | |
| 18 | Somalia | 1977 | 2018 | African | |
| 18 | Uganda | 1973 | 2017 | African | |
| 17 | Guatemala | 1967 | 2023 | GRULAC | |
| 17 | Tanzania | 1966 | 2025 | African | |
| 17 | Zambia | 1974 | 2025 | African | |
| 16 | Lebanon | 1946 | 2018 | Asia-Pacific | |
| 16 | South Africa | 1995 | 2025 | African | |
| 15 | Botswana | 1983 | 2025 | African | |
| 15 | Czech Republic | 1996 | 2024 | E. European | |
| 15 | Jordan | 1961 | 1998 | Asia-Pacific | |
| 15 | Luxembourg | 1964 | 2021 | WEOG | |
| 15 | Mauritius | 1998 | 2024 | African | |
| 15 | Panama | 1966 | 2022 | GRULAC | |
| 15 | Togo | 1976 | 2020 | African | |
| 15 | Trinidad and Tobago | 1973 | 2017 | GRULAC | |
| 15 | Zimbabwe | 1985 | 2023 | African | |
| 14 | Guinea | 1974 | 2007 | African | |
| 14 | Haiti | 1971 | 2025 | GRULAC | |
| 13 | East Germany | 1974 | 1990 | E. European | |
| 13 | Ivory Coast | 1974 | 2025 | African | |
| 13 | Sierra Leone | 1966 | 2000 | African | |
| 12 | Afghanistan | 1959 | 2024 | Asia-Pacific | |
| 12 | Angola | 1992 | 2021 | African | |
| 12 | Bahamas | 1980 | 2012 | GRULAC | |
| 12 | Eswatini | 1982 | 2024 | African | |
| 12 | Guyana | 1984 | 2018 | GRULAC | |
| 12 | Lesotho | 1978 | 2014 | African | |
| 12 | Liberia | 1974 | 2023 | African | |
| 12 | Madagascar | 1971 | 2023 | African | |
| 12 | Malawi | 1980 | 2020 | African | |
| 12 | Mozambique | 1986 | 2010 | African | |
| 12 | Qatar | 1982 | 2025 | Asia-Pacific | |
| 12 | Syria | 1977 | 2001 | Asia-Pacific | |
| 11 | Mauritania | 1977 | 2025 | African | |
| 11 | Nepal | 1980 | 2025 | Asia-Pacific | |
| 11 | Paraguay | 1994 | 2025 | GRULAC | |
| 11 | Suriname | 1983 | 2025 | GRULAC | |
| 10 | Djibouti | 1983 | 2025 | African | |
| 10 | Dominican Republic | 1955 | 2025 | GRULAC | |
| 10 | Hungary | 1971 | 2011 | E. European | |
| 10 | Iceland | 1985 | 2008 | WEOG | |
| 9 | Belize | 1987 | 2024 | GRULAC | |
| 9 | Burundi | 1972 | 2004 | African | |
| 9 | Cape Verde | 1997 | 2025 | African | |
| 9 | Chad | 1968 | 2019 | African | |
| 9 | Croatia | 2000 | 2024 | E. European | |
| 9 | Guinea-Bissau | 1999 | 2011 | African | |
| 9 | Kazakhstan | 2007 | 2024 | Asia-Pacific | |
| 9 | Kuwait | 1967 | 2015 | Asia-Pacific | |
| 9 | Latvia | 1997 | 2022 | E. European | |
| 9 | Mali | 1973 | 2021 | African | |
| 9 | Malta | 1978 | 2020 | WEOG | |
| 9 | Niger | 1971 | 2010 | African | |
| 9 | Oman | 1987 | 2024 | Asia-Pacific | |
| 9 | Saint Lucia | 1982 | 2010 | GRULAC | |
| 8 | Fiji | 1974 | 2002 | Asia-Pacific | |
| 8 | United Arab Emirates | 1978 | 2018 | Asia-Pacific | |
| 7 | Armenia | 2004 | 2025 | E. European | |
| 7 | Azerbaijan | 2003 | 2025 | E. European | |
| 7 | Switzerland | 2011 | 2025 | WEOG | |
| 6 | Albania | 2005 | 2015 | E. European | |
| 6 | Andorra | 2001 | 2019 | WEOG | |
| 6 | Bahrain | 1990 | 2002 | Asia-Pacific | |
| 6 | Barbados | 1979 | 2009 | GRULAC | |
| 6 | Bhutan | 1993 | 2004 | Asia-Pacific | |
| 6 | Central African Republic | 1978 | 1998 | African | |
| 6 | Comoros | 1998 | 2012 | African | |
| 6 | Estonia | 2009 | 2017 | E. European | |
| 6 | Georgia | 2001 | 2016 | E. European | |
| 6 | Honduras | 1999 | 2017 | GRULAC | |
| 6 | Liechtenstein | 2008 | 2025 | WEOG | |
| 6 | Moldova | 2008 | 2018 | E. European | |
| 6 | Mongolia | 1973 | 2012 | Asia-Pacific | |
| 6 | Namibia | 2004 | 2011 | African | |
| 6 | Slovakia | 2010 | 2025 | E. European | |
| 6 | Turkmenistan | 2013 | 2021 | Asia-Pacific | |
| 6 | Viet Nam | 1998 | 2018 | Asia-Pacific | |
| 4 | Antigua and Barbuda | 2014 | 2025 | GRULAC | |
| 4 | Yemen | 1975 | 2019 | Asia-Pacific | Includes 3 years as North Yemen, but excludes 3 years as South Yemen |
| 3 | Cyprus | 1979 | 1981 | Asia-Pacific | |
| 3 | Equatorial Guinea | 2023 | 2025 | African | |
| 3 | Gambia | 1997 | 1999 | African | |
| 3 | Kyrgyzstan | 2013 | 2015 | Asia-Pacific | |
| 3 | Laos | 2023 | 2025 | Asia-Pacific | |
| 3 | Lithuania | 2005 | 2007 | E. European | |
| 3 | Montenegro | 2020 | 2022 | E. European | |
| 3 | Papua New Guinea | 1984 | 1986 | Asia-Pacific | |
| 3 | Saint Kitts and Nevis | 2009 | 2011 | GRULAC | |
| 3 | Saint Vincent and the Grenadines | 2017 | 2019 | GRULAC | |
| 3 | San Marino | 2013 | 2015 | WEOG | |
| 3 | Serbia | 2014 | 2016 | E. European | |
| 3 | Slovenia | 2023 | 2025 | E. European | |
| 3 | Solomon Islands | 2021 | 2023 | Asia-Pacific | |
| 3 | South Yemen | 1974 | 1976 | Asian | |
| 2 | Israel | 2022 | 2023 | WEOG | |
| 2 | Tajikistan | 2017 | 2018 | Asia-Pacific | |
| 1 | Bosnia and Herzegovina | 2017 | 2017 | E. European | |
| 1 | Cambodia | 2019 | 2019 | Asia-Pacific | |
| 1 | Uzbekistan | 2025 | 2025 | Asia-Pacific | |

== Non-members ==
This lists all current UN members that have never been a member of the Economic and Social Council.

| UN Member state | Regional Group |
|---|---|
| Brunei | Asia-Pacific |
| Dominica | GRULAC |
| East Timor | Asia-Pacific |
| Eritrea | African |
| Grenada | GRULAC |
| Kiribati | None |
| Maldives | Asia-Pacific |
| Marshall Islands | Asia-Pacific |
| Micronesia | Asia-Pacific |
| Monaco | WEOG |
| Myanmar | Asia-Pacific |
| Nauru | Asia-Pacific |
| North Korea | Asia-Pacific |
| North Macedonia | E. European |
| Palau | Asia-Pacific |
| Samoa | Asia-Pacific |
| São Tomé and Príncipe | African |
| Seychelles | Asia-Pacific |
| Singapore | Asia-Pacific |
| South Sudan | African |
| Tonga | Asia-Pacific |
| Tuvalu | Asia-Pacific |
| Vanuatu | Asia-Pacific |

== See also ==
- United Nations Regional Groups
- List of United Nations member states
- List of members of the United Nations Security Council
- List of members of the United Nations Commission on Human Rights
