= List of members of the United Nations Commission on Human Rights =

The United Nations Commission on Human Rights was a functional commission within the overall framework of the United Nations from 1946 until it was replaced by the UN Human Rights Council in 2006. It was a subsidiary body of the UN Economic and Social Council (ECOSOC), which elected members through the mechanism of the United Nations Regional Groups.

== Membership by regional group (UNCHR) until 2005 ==
=== African Group ===
| 1947 | Egypt | | | | | | | | | | | | | | |
| 1948 | Egypt | | | | | | | | | | | | | | |
| 1949 | Egypt | | | | | | | | | | | | | | |
| 1950 | Egypt | | | | | | | | | | | | | | |
| 1951 | Egypt | | | | | | | | | | | | | | |
| 1952 | Egypt | | | | | | | | | | | | | | |
| 1953 | Egypt | | | | | | | | | | | | | | |
| 1954 | Egypt | | | | | | | | | | | | | | |
| 1955 | Egypt | | | | | | | | | | | | | | |
| 1956 | | | | | | | | | | | | | | | |
| 1957 | | | | | | | | | | | | | | | |
| 1958 | | | | | | | | | | | | | | | |
| 1959 | | | | | | | | | | | | | | | |
| 1960 | | | | | | | | | | | | | | | |
| 1962 | | | | | | | | | | | | | | | |
| 1961 | | | | | | | | | | | | | | | |
| 1962 | | | | | | | | | | | | | | | |
| 1963 | Liberia | | | | | | | | | | | | | | |
| 1964 | Liberia | Benin | | | | | | | | | | | | | |
| 1965 | Liberia | Benin | | | | | | | | | | | | | |
| 1966 | Somalia | Benin | Senegal | | | | | | | | | | | | |
| 1967 | Egypt | Benin | Senegal | Congo | Morocco | Nigeria | Tanzania | | | | | | | | |
| 1968 | Egypt | Benin | Senegal | Congo | Morocco | Nigeria | Madagascar | | | | | | | | |
| 1969 | Egypt | Mauritania | Senegal | Congo | Morocco | Nigeria | Madagascar | | | | | | | | |
| 1970 | Egypt | Mauritania | Senegal | Congo | Morocco | Ghana | Madagascar | | | | | | | | |
| 1971 | Egypt | Mauritania | Senegal | Congo | Morocco | Ghana | Mauritius | | | | | | | | |
| 1972 | Egypt | Nigeria | Senegal | Zaire | Morocco | Ghana | Mauritius | | | | | | | | |
| 1973 | Egypt | Nigeria | Senegal | Zaire | Tunisia | Ghana | Mauritius | | | | | | | | |
| 1974 | Egypt | Nigeria | Senegal | Zaire | Tunisia | Ghana | Sierra Leone | | | | | | | | |
| 1975 | Egypt | Burkina Faso | Senegal | Zaire | Tunisia | Ghana | Sierra Leone | | | | | | | | |
| 1976 | Egypt | Burkina Faso | Senegal | Lesotho | Libya | Rwanda | Sierra Leone | | | | | | | | |
| 1977 | Egypt | Burkina Faso | Senegal | Lesotho | Libya | Rwanda | Nigeria | Uganda | | | | | | | |
| 1978 | Egypt | Ivory Coast | Senegal | Lesotho | Libya | Rwanda | Nigeria | Uganda | | | | | | | |
| 1979 | Egypt | Ivory Coast | Senegal | Benin | Morocco | Burundi | Nigeria | Uganda | | | | | | | |
| 1980 | Egypt | Ivory Coast | Senegal | Benin | Morocco | Burundi | Nigeria | Algeria | Ethiopia | Ghana | Zambia | | | | |
| 1981 | Uganda | Zaire | Senegal | Benin | Morocco | Burundi | Nigeria | Algeria | Ethiopia | Ghana | Zambia | | | | |
| 1982 | Uganda | Zaire | Senegal | The Gambia | Rwanda | Togo | Zimbabwe | Algeria | Ethiopia | Ghana | Zambia | | | | |
| 1983 | Uganda | Zaire | Senegal | The Gambia | Rwanda | Togo | Zimbabwe | Libya | Mozambique | Ghana | Tanzania | | | | |
| 1984 | Cameroon | Mauritania | Senegal | The Gambia | Rwanda | Togo | Zimbabwe | Libya | Mozambique | Kenya | Tanzania | | | | |
| 1985 | Cameroon | Mauritania | Senegal | The Gambia | Congo | Lesotho | Liberia | Libya | Mozambique | Kenya | Tanzania | | | | |
| 1986 | Cameroon | Mauritania | Senegal | The Gambia | Congo | Lesotho | Liberia | Algeria | Mozambique | Kenya | Ethiopia | | | | |
| 1987 | Somalia | Togo | Senegal | The Gambia | Congo | Lesotho | Liberia | Algeria | Mozambique | Rwanda | Ethiopia | | | | |
| 1988 | Somalia | Togo | Senegal | The Gambia | Botswana | Nigeria | Sao Tome and Principe | Algeria | Mozambique | Rwanda | Ethiopia | | | | |
| 1989 | Somalia | Togo | Senegal | The Gambia | Botswana | Nigeria | Sao Tome and Principe | Morocco | Swaziland | Rwanda | Ethiopia | | | | |
| 1990 | Somalia | Ghana | Senegal | The Gambia | Botswana | Nigeria | Sao Tome and Principe | Morocco | Swaziland | Madagascar | Ethiopia | | | | |
| 1991 | Somalia | Ghana | Senegal | The Gambia | Burundi | Mauritania | Zambia | Morocco | Swaziland | Madagascar | Ethiopia | | | | |
| 1992 | Somalia | Ghana | Senegal | The Gambia | Burundi | Mauritania | Zambia | Tunisia | Gabon | Madagascar | Angola | Kenya | Lesotho | Libya | Nigeria |
| 1993 | Guinea-Bissau | Sudan | Togo | The Gambia | Burundi | Mauritania | Zambia | Tunisia | Gabon | Mauritius | Angola | Kenya | Lesotho | Libya | Nigeria |
| 1994 | Guinea-Bissau | Sudan | Togo | Malawi | Cameroon | Mauritania | Ivory Coast | Tunisia | Gabon | Mauritius | Angola | Kenya | Lesotho | Libya | Nigeria |
| 1995 | Guinea-Bissau | Sudan | Togo | Malawi | Cameroon | Mauritania | Ivory Coast | Algeria | Gabon | Mauritius | Angola | Ethiopia | Benin | Zimbabwe | Egypt |
| 1996 | Guinea | Madagascar | Uganda | Malawi | Cameroon | Mauritania | Ivory Coast | Algeria | Gabon | Mali | Angola | Ethiopia | Benin | Zimbabwe | Egypt |
| 1997 | Guinea | Madagascar | Uganda | Mozambique | Cape Verde | DR Congo | South Africa | Algeria | Gabon | Mali | Angola | Ethiopia | Benin | Zimbabwe | Egypt |
| 1998 | Guinea | Madagascar | Uganda | Mozambique | Cape Verde | DR Congo | South Africa | Botswana | Congo | Mali | Morocco | Tunisia | Rwanda | Senegal | Sudan |
| 1999 | Mauritius | Madagascar | Niger | Mozambique | Cape Verde | DR Congo | South Africa | Botswana | Congo | Liberia | Morocco | Tunisia | Rwanda | Senegal | Sudan |
| 2000 | Mauritius | Madagascar | Niger | Nigeria | Swaziland | Zambia | Burundi | Botswana | Congo | Liberia | Morocco | Tunisia | Rwanda | Senegal | Sudan |
| 2001 | Mauritius | Madagascar | Niger | Nigeria | Swaziland | Zambia | Burundi | Cameroon | DR Congo | Liberia | Algeria | Kenya | Libya | Senegal | South Africa |
| 2002 | Sudan | Uganda | Togo | Nigeria | Swaziland | Zambia | Burundi | Cameroon | DR Congo | Sierra Leone | Algeria | Kenya | Libya | Senegal | South Africa |
| 2003 | Sudan | Uganda | Togo | Gabon | Swaziland | Zimbabwe | Burkina Faso | Cameroon | DR Congo | Sierra Leone | Algeria | Kenya | Libya | Senegal | South Africa |
| 2004 | Sudan | Uganda | Togo | Gabon | Swaziland | Zimbabwe | Burkina Faso | Congo | Eritrea | Ethiopia | Egypt | Mauritania | Nigeria | Sierra Leone | South Africa |
| 2005 | Sudan | Kenya | Togo | Gabon | Swaziland | Zimbabwe | Burkina Faso | Congo | Eritrea | Ethiopia | Egypt | Mauritania | Nigeria | Guinea | South Africa |

=== Asian Group ===
| 2005 | Bhutan | People's Republic of China | India | Indonesia | Japan | Malaysia | Nepal | Pakistan | Qatar | South Korea | Saudi Arabia | Sri Lanka | Bangladesh |

=== Eastern European Group ===
| 2005 | Armenia | Hungary | Romania | Russian Federation | Ukraine |

=== Latin American and Caribbean Group ===
| 2005 | Argentina | Brazil | Costa Rica | Cuba | Dominican Republic | Ecuador | Guatemala | Honduras | Mexico | Paraguay | Peru |

=== Western European and Others Group ===
| 1990 | France | Italy | United States | Belgium | Canada | Sweden | Germany | Portugal | Spain | United Kingdom |
| 1991 | France | Italy | United States | Belgium | Canada | Sweden | Germany | Portugal | Australia | Austria |
| 1992 | France | Italy | United States | Netherlands | Canada | United Kingdom | Germany | Portugal | Australia | Austria |
| 1993 | France | Finland | United States | Netherlands | Canada | United Kingdom | Germany | Portugal | Australia | Austria |
| 1994 | France | Finland | United States | Netherlands | Canada | United Kingdom | Germany | Italy | Australia | Austria |
| 1995 | France | Finland | United States | Netherlands | Canada | United Kingdom | Germany | Italy | Australia | Austria |
| 1996 | France | Denmark | United States | Netherlands | Canada | United Kingdom | Germany | Italy | Australia | Austria |
| 1997 | France | Denmark | United States | Netherlands | Canada | United Kingdom | Germany | Italy | Ireland | Austria |
| 1998 | France | Denmark | United States | Luxembourg | Canada | United Kingdom | Germany | Italy | Ireland | Austria |
| 1999 | France | Norway | United States | Luxembourg | Canada | United Kingdom | Germany | Italy | Ireland | Austria |
| 2000 | France | Norway | United States | Luxembourg | Canada | United Kingdom | Germany | Italy | Portugal | Spain |
| 2001 | France | Norway | United States | Belgium | Canada | United Kingdom | Germany | Italy | Portugal | Spain |
| 2002 | France | Sweden | Austria | Belgium | Canada | United Kingdom | Germany | Italy | Portugal | Spain |
| 2003 | France | Sweden | Austria | Belgium | Canada | United Kingdom | Germany | Australia | Ireland | United States |
| 2004 | France | Sweden | Austria | Netherlands | Italy | United Kingdom | Germany | Australia | Ireland | United States |
| 2005 | France | Finland | Canada | Netherlands | Italy | United Kingdom | Germany | Australia | Ireland | United States |
| 2006 | France | Finland | Canada | Netherlands | Italy | United Kingdom | Germany | Australia | Austria | United States |

== Membership by regional group (UNHRC) From 2006 ==
=== African Group ===
| 2006 | Djibouti | Cameroon | Mauritius | Senegal | Nigeria | Gabon | Ghana | Mali | Zambia | Algeria | Morocco | Tunisia | South Africa |
| 2007 | Djibouti | Cameroon | Mauritius | Senegal | Nigeria | Gabon | Ghana | Mali | Zambia | Algeria | Morocco | Tunisia | South Africa |
| 2008 | Djibouti | Cameroon | Mauritius | Senegal | Nigeria | Gabon | Ghana | Mali | Zambia | Egypt | Angola | Madagascar | South Africa |
| 2009 | Djibouti | Cameroon | Mauritius | Senegal | Nigeria | Gabon | Ghana | Burkina Faso | Zambia | Egypt | Angola | Madagascar | South Africa |
| 2010 | Djibouti | Cameroon | Mauritius | Senegal | Nigeria | Gabon | Ghana | Burkina Faso | Zambia | Egypt | Angola | Madagascar | South Africa |
| 2011 | Djibouti | Cameroon | Mauritius | Senegal | Nigeria | Gabon | Ghana | Burkina Faso | Zambia | Libya | Angola | Mauritania | Uganda |
| 2012 | Djibouti | Cameroon | Mauritius | Senegal | Nigeria | Benin | Botswana | Burkina Faso | Congo | Libya | Angola | Mauritania | Uganda |
| 2013 | Ethiopia | Côte d'Ivoire | Gabon | Sierra Leone | Kenya | Benin | Botswana | Burkina Faso | Congo | Libya | Angola | Mauritania | Uganda |
| 2014 | Ethiopia | Côte d'Ivoire | Gabon | Sierra Leone | Kenya | Benin | Botswana | Burkina Faso | Congo | Morocco | Algeria | Namibia | South Africa |
| 2015 | Ethiopia | Côte d'Ivoire | Gabon | Sierra Leone | Kenya | Nigeria | Botswana | Ghana | Congo | Morocco | Algeria | Namibia | South Africa |
| 2016 | Ethiopia | Côte d'Ivoire | Togo | Burundi | Kenya | Nigeria | Botswana | Ghana | Congo | Morocco | Algeria | Namibia | South Africa |
| 2017 | Ethiopia | Côte d'Ivoire | Togo | Burundi | Kenya | Nigeria | Botswana | Ghana | Congo | Rwanda | Egypt | Tunisia | South Africa |
| 2018 | Ethiopia | Côte d'Ivoire | Togo | Burundi | Kenya | Nigeria | Senegal | Angola | Congo | Rwanda | Egypt | Tunisia | South Africa |
| 2019 | Eritrea | Cameroon | Togo | Burkina Faso | Somalia | Nigeria | Senegal | Angola | Congo | Rwanda | Egypt | Tunisia | South Africa |
| 2020 | Eritrea | Cameroon | Togo | Burkina Faso | Somalia | Nigeria | Senegal | Angola | Congo | Libya | Mauritania | Sudan | Namibia |
| 2021 | Eritrea | Cameroon | Togo | Burkina Faso | Somalia | Côte d'Ivoire | Senegal | Malawi | Gabon | Libya | Mauritania | Sudan | Namibia |
| 2022 | Benin | Cameroon | Eritrea | Gambia | Somalia | Côte d'Ivoire | Senegal | Malawi | Gabon | Libya | Mauritania | Sudan | Namibia |
| 2023 | Benin | Cameroon | Eritrea | Gambia | Somalia | Côte d'Ivoire | Senegal | Malawi | Gabon | Algeria | Morocco | Sudan | South Africa |
| 2024 | Benin | Cameroon | Eritrea | Gambia | Somalia | Côte d'Ivoire | Burundi | Malawi | Ghana | Algeria | Morocco | Sudan | South Africa |
| 2025 | Benin | Democratic Republic of the Congo | Ethiopia | Gambia | Kenya | Côte d'Ivoire | Burundi | Malawi | Ghana | Algeria | Morocco | Sudan | South Africa |

=== Asia-Pacific Group ===
| 2006 | Jordan | China | Malaysia | Saudi Arabia | Bangladesh | Pakistan | Japan | South Korea | Sri Lanka | India | Indonesia | Bahrain | Philippines |
| 2007 | Jordan | China | Malaysia | Saudi Arabia | Bangladesh | Pakistan | Japan | South Korea | Sri Lanka | India | Indonesia | Bahrain | Philippines |
| 2008 | Jordan | China | Malaysia | Saudi Arabia | Bangladesh | Pakistan | Japan | South Korea | Sri Lanka | India | Indonesia | Qatar | Philippines |
| 2009 | Jordan | China | Malaysia | Saudi Arabia | Bangladesh | Pakistan | Japan | South Korea | Bahrain | India | Indonesia | Qatar | Philippines |
| 2010 | Jordan | China | Kyrgyzstan | Saudi Arabia | Bangladesh | Pakistan | Japan | South Korea | Bahrain | India | Indonesia | Qatar | Philippines |
| 2011 | Jordan | China | Kyrgyzstan | Saudi Arabia | Bangladesh | Pakistan | Japan | South Korea | Bahrain | Thailand | Malaysia | Qatar | Maldives |
| 2012 | Jordan | China | Kyrgyzstan | Saudi Arabia | Bangladesh | India | Kuwait | Philippines | Indonesia | Thailand | Malaysia | Qatar | Maldives |
| 2013 | South Korea | Kazakhstan | Pakistan | United Arab Emirates | Japan | India | Kuwait | Philippines | Indonesia | Thailand | Malaysia | Qatar | Maldives |
| 2014 | South Korea | Kazakhstan | Pakistan | United Arab Emirates | Japan | India | Kuwait | Philippines | Indonesia | China | Saudi Arabia | Vietnam | Maldives |
| 2015 | South Korea | Kazakhstan | Pakistan | United Arab Emirates | Japan | India | Bangladesh | Qatar | Indonesia | China | Saudi Arabia | Vietnam | Maldives |
| 2016 | South Korea | Mongolia | Philippines | United Arab Emirates | Kyrgyzstan | India | Bangladesh | Qatar | Indonesia | China | Saudi Arabia | Vietnam | Maldives |
| 2017 | South Korea | Mongolia | Philippines | United Arab Emirates | Kyrgyzstan | India | Bangladesh | Qatar | Indonesia | China | Saudi Arabia | Japan | Iraq |
| 2018 | South Korea | Mongolia | Philippines | United Arab Emirates | Kyrgyzstan | Nepal | Afghanistan | Qatar | Pakistan | China | Saudi Arabia | Japan | Iraq |
| 2019 | India | Bangladesh | Philippines | Fiji | Bahrain | Nepal | Afghanistan | Qatar | Pakistan | China | Saudi Arabia | Japan | Iraq |
| 2020 | India | Bangladesh | Philippines | Fiji | Bahrain | Nepal | Afghanistan | Qatar | Pakistan | Indonesia | Marshall Islands | Japan | South Korea |
| 2021 | India | Bangladesh | Philippines | Fiji | Bahrain | Nepal | China | Uzbekistan | Pakistan | Indonesia | Marshall Islands | Japan | South Korea |
| 2022 | India | Kazakhstan | Malaysia | Qatar | United Arab Emirates | Nepal | China | Uzbekistan | Pakistan | Indonesia | Marshall Islands | Japan | South Korea |
| 2023 | India | Kazakhstan | Malaysia | Qatar | United Arab Emirates | Nepal | China | Uzbekistan | Pakistan | Bangladesh | Kyrgyzstan | Maldives | Vietnam |
| 2024 | India | Kazakhstan | Malaysia | Qatar | United Arab Emirates | Indonesia | China | Japan | Kuwait | Bangladesh | Kyrgyzstan | Maldives | Vietnam |
| 2025 | Cyprus | Marshall Islands | Qatar | South Korea | Thailand | Indonesia | China | Japan | Kuwait | Bangladesh | Kyrgyzstan | Maldives | Vietnam |

=== Eastern European Group ===
| 2006 | Azerbaijan | Russia | Romania | | Ukraine | Poland | Czech Republic |
| 2007 | Azerbaijan | Russia | Romania | | Ukraine | Poland | Czech Republic |
| 2008 | Azerbaijan | Russia | Romania | | Ukraine | Bosnia and Herzegovina | Slovenia |
| 2009 | Azerbaijan | Russia | Slovakia | | Ukraine | Bosnia and Herzegovina | Slovenia |
| 2010 | Hungary | Russia | Slovakia | | Ukraine | Bosnia and Herzegovina | Slovenia |
| 2011 | Hungary | Russia | Slovakia | | Ukraine | Moldova | Poland |
| 2012 | Hungary | Russia | Romania | | Czech Republic | Moldova | Poland |
| 2013 | Montenegro | Estonia | Romania | | Czech Republic | Moldova | Poland |
| 2014 | Montenegro | Estonia | Romania | | Czech Republic | Russia | North Macedonia |
| 2015 | Montenegro | Estonia | Albania | | Latvia | Russia | North Macedonia |
| 2016 | Slovenia | Georgia | Albania | | Latvia | Russia | North Macedonia |
| 2017 | Slovenia | Georgia | Albania | | Latvia | Croatia | Hungary |
| 2018 | Slovenia | Georgia | Slovakia | | Ukraine | Croatia | Hungary |
| 2019 | Czech Republic | Bulgaria | Slovakia | | Ukraine | Croatia | Hungary |
| 2020 | Czech Republic | Bulgaria | Slovakia | | Ukraine | Armenia | Poland |
| 2021 | Czech Republic | Bulgaria | ~~Russia~~ (Note: Membership suspended from the Council by UN General Assembly Resolution ES-11/3 following the 2022 Russian invasion of Ukraine.) | | Ukraine | Armenia | Poland |
| 2022 | Lithuania | Montenegro | ~~Russia~~ | Czech Republic | Ukraine | Armenia | Poland |
| 2023 | Lithuania | Montenegro | Czech Republic | | Ukraine | Georgia | Romania |
| 2024 | Lithuania | Montenegro | Albania | | Bulgaria | Georgia | Romania |
| 2025 | Czech Republic | North Macedonia | Albania | | Bulgaria | Georgia | Romania |

=== Latin American and Caribbean Group ===
| 2006 | Mexico | Uruguay | Cuba | Brazil | Guatemala | Peru | Argentina | Ecuador |
| 2007 | Mexico | Uruguay | Cuba | Brazil | Guatemala | Peru | Argentina | Ecuador |
| 2008 | Mexico | Uruguay | Cuba | Brazil | Guatemala | Peru | Bolivia | Nicaragua |
| 2009 | Mexico | Uruguay | Cuba | Brazil | Argentina | Chile | Bolivia | Nicaragua |
| 2010 | Mexico | Uruguay | Cuba | Brazil | Argentina | Chile | Bolivia | Nicaragua |
| 2011 | Mexico | Uruguay | Cuba | Brazil | Argentina | Chile | Ecuador | Guatemala |
| 2012 | Mexico | Uruguay | Cuba | Peru | Costa Rica | Chile | Ecuador | Guatemala |
| 2013 | Argentina | Brazil | Venezuela | Peru | Costa Rica | Chile | Ecuador | Guatemala |
| 2014 | Argentina | Brazil | Venezuela | Peru | Costa Rica | Chile | Cuba | Mexico |
| 2015 | Argentina | Brazil | Venezuela | Paraguay | El Salvador | Bolivia | Cuba | Mexico |
| 2016 | Ecuador | Panama | Venezuela | Paraguay | El Salvador | Bolivia | Cuba | Mexico |
| 2017 | Ecuador | Panama | Venezuela | Paraguay | El Salvador | Bolivia | Cuba | Brazil |
| 2018 | Ecuador | Panama | Venezuela | Peru | Chile | Mexico | Cuba | Brazil |
| 2019 | Argentina | Bahamas | Uruguay | Peru | Chile | Mexico | Cuba | Brazil |
| 2020 | Argentina | Bahamas | Uruguay | Peru | Chile | Mexico | Venezuela | Brazil |
| 2021 | Argentina | Bahamas | Uruguay | Bolivia | Cuba | Mexico | Venezuela | Brazil |
| 2022 | Argentina | Honduras | Paraguay | Bolivia | Cuba | Mexico | Venezuela | Brazil |
| 2023 | Argentina | Honduras | Paraguay | Bolivia | Cuba | Mexico | Chile | Costa Rica |
| 2024 | Argentina | Honduras | Paraguay | Brazil | Cuba | Dominican Republic | Chile | Costa Rica |
| 2025 | Bolivia | Colombia | Mexico | Brazil | Cuba | Dominican Republic | Chile | Costa Rica |

=== Western European and Others Group ===
| 2006 | Germany | Canada | Switzerland | France | United Kingdom | Finland | Netherlands | |
| 2007 | Germany | Canada | Switzerland | France | United Kingdom | Finland | Netherlands | |
| 2008 | Germany | Canada | Switzerland | France | United Kingdom | Italy | Netherlands | |
| 2009 | Germany | Canada | Switzerland | France | United Kingdom | Italy | Netherlands | |
| 2010 | Belgium | Norway | United States | France | United Kingdom | Italy | Netherlands | |
| 2011 | Belgium | Norway | United States | France | United Kingdom | Spain | Switzerland | |
| 2012 | Belgium | Norway | United States | Italy | Austria | Spain | Switzerland | |
| 2013 | Germany | Ireland | United States | Italy | Austria | Spain | Switzerland | |
| 2014 | Germany | Ireland | United States | Italy | Austria | United Kingdom | Switzerland | |
| 2015 | Germany | Ireland | United States | Netherlands | Portugal | United Kingdom | Switzerland | |
| 2016 | Germany | Belgium | Switzerland | Netherlands | Portugal | United Kingdom | Switzerland | |
| 2017 | Germany | Belgium | Switzerland | Netherlands | Portugal | United Kingdom | United States | |
| 2018 | Germany | Belgium | Switzerland | Australia | Spain | United Kingdom | United States | Iceland |
| 2018 | Germany | Belgium | Switzerland | Australia | Spain | United Kingdom | Iceland (Note: The United States left the council in June 2018. Iceland finished the USA's term.) | |
| 2019 | Denmark | Austria | Italy | Australia | Spain | United Kingdom | Iceland | |
| 2020 | Denmark | Austria | Italy | Australia | Spain | Germany | Netherlands | |
| 2021 | Denmark | Austria | Italy | France | United Kingdom | Germany | Netherlands | |
| 2022 | Finland | Luxembourg | United States | France | United Kingdom | Germany | Netherlands | |
| 2023 | Finland | Luxembourg | United States | France | United Kingdom | Germany | Belgium | |
| 2024 | Finland | Luxembourg | United States | France | Netherlands | Germany | Belgium | |
| 2025 | Iceland | Spain | Switzerland | France | Netherlands | Germany | Belgium | |

== Non-members ==
The list is a summary of all countries that have never been a member of United Nations Human Rights Council.

| UN Member state | Regional Group |
|---|---|
| Andorra | WEOG |
| Antigua and Barbuda | GRULAC |
| Barbados | GRULAC |
| Belarus | E. European |
| Belize | GRULAC |
| Bhutan | Asia-Pacific |
| Brunei | Asia-Pacific |
| Cambodia | Asia-Pacific |
| Cabo Verde | African |
| Central African Republic | African |
| Chad | African |
| Comoros | African |
| Dominica | GRULAC |
| Equatorial Guinea | African |
| Eswatini | African |
| Greece | WEOG |
| Grenada | GRULAC |
| Guinea | African |
| Guinea-Bissau | African |
| Guyana | GRULAC |
| Haiti | GRULAC |
| Iran | Asia-Pacific |
| Israel | WEOG |
| Jamaica | GRULAC |
| Kiribati | None (Note: As of May 2006, Kiribati is not a member of any regional group.) |
| Laos | Asia-Pacific |
| Lebanon | Asia-Pacific |
| Lesotho | African |
| Liberia | African |
| Liechtenstein | WEOG |
| Malta | WEOG |
| Micronesia | Asia-Pacific |
| Monaco | WEOG |
| Mozambique | African |
| Myanmar | Asia-Pacific |
| Nauru | Asia-Pacific |
| New Zealand | WEOG |
| Niger | African |
| North Korea | Asia-Pacific |
| Oman | Asia-Pacific |
| Palau | Asia-Pacific |
| Papua New Guinea | Asia-Pacific |
| Saint Kitts and Nevis | GRULAC |
| Saint Lucia | GRULAC |
| Saint Vincent and the Grenadines | GRULAC |
| Samoa | Asia-Pacific |
| San Marino | WEOG |
| São Tomé and Príncipe | African |
| Serbia | E. European |
| Seychelles | African |
| Singapore | Asia-Pacific |
| Solomon Islands | Asia-Pacific |
| South Sudan | African |
| Suriname | GRULAC |
| Sweden | WEOG |
| Syria | Asia-Pacific |
| Tanzania | African |
| Tajikistan | Asia-Pacific |
| Timor-Leste | Asia-Pacific |
| Tonga | Asia-Pacific |
| Trinidad and Tobago | GRULAC |
| Turkey | WEOG |
| Turkmenistan | Asia-Pacific |
| Tuvalu | Asia-Pacific |
| Vanuatu | Asia-Pacific |
| Yemen | Asia-Pacific |
| Zimbabwe | African |

== See also ==
- United Nations Regional Groups
- List of United Nations member states
- List of members of the United Nations Security Council
- List of members of the United Nations Economic and Social Council
