= 2025 in the United Nations =

List of UN-related events

Events in the year 2025 in the United Nations.

== Incumbents ==
- Secretary-General: António Guterres (Portugal/Timor-Leste)
- Deputy Secretary-General: Amina J. Mohammed (Nigeria)
- General Assembly President: Philémon Yang (Cameroon) .
- Economic and Security Council President: Bob Rae (Canada)
- Security Council Presidents: Algeria, China, Denmark, France, Greece, Guyana, Pakistan, Panama, South Korea, Russia, Sierra Leone, Slovenia, Somalia, United Kingdom, United States (rotates monthly)

== Events ==
- January 15: United Nations Security Council Resolution 2768: The United Nations Security Council demanding the Houthis to halt attacks on vessels in the Red Sea.
- January 16: United Nations Security Council Resolution 2769: The United Nations Security Council renewed the mandate of the Panel of Experts of the 1970 Libya Sanctions Committee.
- January 24: United Nations Security Council Resolution 2770: The resolution established an election date of May 27, 2025 to fill a vacancy on the International Court of Justice, due to the vacancy caused by the resignation of Nawaf Salam.
- January 31: United Nations Security Council Resolution 2771: Extends Mandate of United Nations Peacekeeping Force in Cyprus until January 31, 2026.
- February 17: United Nations Security Council Resolution 2772: Renews the panel on the sanctions on Sudan for one Year
- February 21: United Nations Security Council Resolution 2773: Condemns ongoing offensives by M23 Rebel Movement in Eastern Democratic Republic of the Congo.
- February 24: United Nations Security Council Resolution 2774: Imploring a swift end to the conflict between Ukraine and the Russian Federation.
- February 28: United Nations Security Council Resolution 2775: Reauthorizes Maritime Indiction Provisions of Arms Embargo on Somalia.
- March 3: United Nations Security Council Resolution 2776: Extends Al-Shabaab Sanctions Regime.
- March 17: United Nations Security Council Resolution 2777: Extends the mandate of the United Nations Assistance Mission in Afghanistan (UNAMA)
- April 30: United Nations Security Council Resolution 2778: Extends the United Nations Mission in South Sudan (UNMISS) by nine days, until May 9.
- May 8: United Nations Security Council Resolution 2779: Extends the United Nations Mission in South Sudan (UNMISS) by nine days, until April 30, 2026.
- May 29: United Nations Security Council Resolution 2780: Renews the Arms Embargo on Libya for six months.
- May 30: United Nations Security Council Resolution 2781: Renews the sanctions regime, including targeted sanctions and an arms embargo on South Sudan. until 31 May, 2026.
- June 30: United Nations Security Council Resolution 2782: Renews Mandate of Force Monitoring Israel-Syria Disengagement Agreement.
- June 30: United Nations Security Council Resolution 2783: Renews Democratic Republic of Congo Sanctions Regime.
- July 2: United Nations Security Council Resolution 2784: Sets November Election Date to Fill Vacancy on International Court of Justice.
- July 14: United Nations Security Council Resolution 2785: Extends the mandate of the United Nations Integrated Office in Haiti (BINUH) until 31 January 2026.
- July 14: United Nations Security Council Resolution 2786: Renews Mandate of United Nations Mission to Support Hudaydah Agreement.
- July 15: United Nations Security Council Resolution 2787: Extends Reporting Requirement on Houthi Attacks against Merchant, Commercial Vessels in Red Sea.
- July 22: United Nations Security Council Resolution 2788: Security Council Seeks to Bolster UN Toolkit on Peaceful Conflict Resolution.
- July 29: United Nations Security Council Resolution 2789: Extends sanctions regime targeting Non-State armed groups, individuals in Central African Republic for one Year.
- August 28: United Nations Security Council Resolution 2790: Security council extends mandate of United Nations Interim Force in Lebanon.
- September 12: United Nations Security Council Resolution 2791: Renews Sudan Sanctions Regime.
- September 17: United Nations Security Council Resolution 2792: Requests appointment of Senior Official to Address Fate of Missing Persons in Gulf War.
- September 30: United Nations Security Council Resolution 2793: Authorizes UN member states to transition the Multinational Security Support (MSS) mission in Haiti into a “Gang Suppression Force” (GSF) for an initial period of 1 year.
- October 17: United Nations Security Council Resolution 2794: Renews the 2653 Haiti sanctions regime for one year and adds Dimitri Herard and Kempes Sanon to the sanctions list.
- October 31: United Nations Security Council Resolution 2795: Renews the authorization of the EU-led multinational stabilisation force (EUFOR ALTHEA) for another year.
- October 31: United Nations Security Council Resolution 2796: Extends UNSMIL’s mandate for a year.
- October 31: United Nations Security Council Resolution 2797: Extends the mandate of the United Nations Mission for the Referendum in Western Sahara (MINURSO) for a year.
- October 31: United Nations Security Council Resolution 2798: Extends the mandate of the United Nations Verification Mission in Colombia for one year.
- November 6: United Nations Security Council Resolution 2799: Removed Syrian President Ahmed al-Sharaa and Syrian Interior Minister Anas Khattab from the Islamic State in Iraq and the Levant (ISIL/Da’esh) and Al-Qaida sanctions list
- November 13: United Nations Security Council Resolution 2800: Extends the mandate of the UN Multidimensional Integrated Stabilization Mission in the Central African Republic (MINUSCA) for a year.
- November 14: United Nations Security Council Resolution 2801: Renewed the 2140 Yemen sanctions regime for a year.
- November 14: United Nations Security Council Resolution 2802: Extends the mandate of the United Nations Interim Security Force for Abyei (UNISFA) for a year.
- November 17: United Nations Security Council Resolution 2803: Endorses the Gaza peace plan, and welcomes the formation of a Board of Peace.
- November 25: United Nations Security Council Resolution 2804: extends authorizations related to the arms embargo on Libya for six months.
- November 26: United Nations Security Council Resolution 2805: Reaffirms the mandate of the Peacebuilding Commission, acting in parallel with the General Assembly.
- December 12: United Nations Security Council Resolution 2806: Extends its sanctions on weapons entering Somalia until November 30.
- December 12: United Nations Security Council Resolution 2807: Calls on those relevant to “consider ways to increase the full, effective, safe and meaningful youth participation and leadership in peace processes, conflict prevention, peacebuilding, recovery and reconstruction at all levels”,
- December 19: United Nations Security Council Resolution 2808: Extends the mandate of the United Nations Organization Stabilization Mission in the Democratic Republic of the Congo (MONUSCO) for a year.
- December 23: United Nations Security Council Resolution 2809: Extends the authorization of the African Union Support and Stabilisation Mission in Somalia (AUSSOM) until 31 December 2026.
- December 29: United Nations Security Council Resolution 2810: Renews the mandate of the Counter-Terrorism Committee Executive Directorate (CTED) until 5 January 2029.
- December 29: United Nations Security Council Resolution 2811: Renews the mandate for the UN Disengagement Observer Force (UNDOF) in the Golan Heights until June 30, 2026.
