= United Nations Security Council Resolution 2728 =

Calling for ceasefire in Gaza war

UN Security Council Resolution 2728
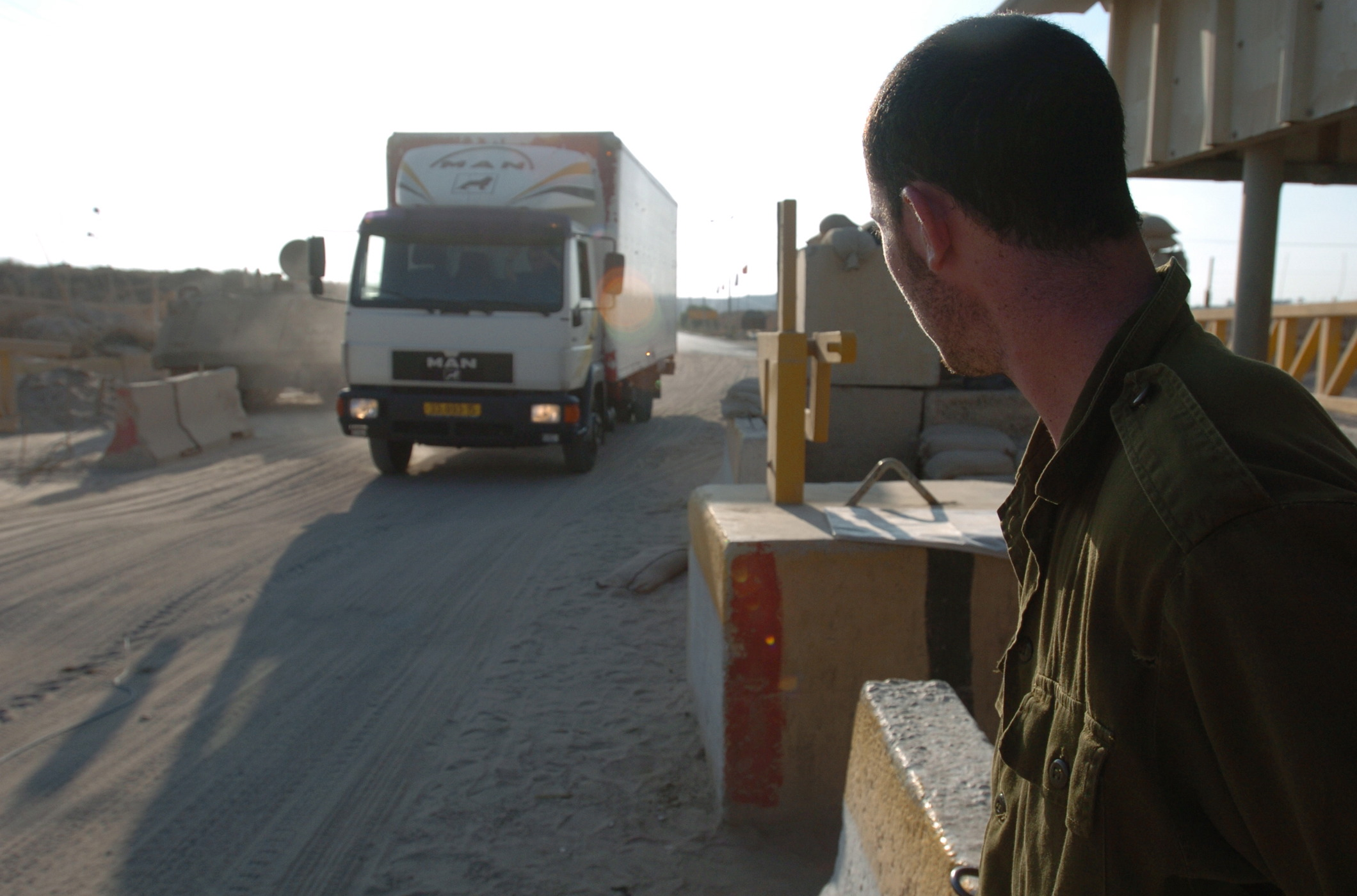
- Border between Gaza and Israel (2005)
- Date: 25 March 2024
- Meeting no.: 9,586
- Code: S/RES/2728(2024) (Document)
- Subject: Gaza war, Gaza humanitarian crisis
- Voting summary: 14 voted for; None voted against; 1 abstained
- Result: Adopted

Security Council composition
- Permanent members: China; France; Russia; United Kingdom; United States
- Non-permanent members: Algeria; Ecuador; Guyana; Japan; South Korea; Malta; Mozambique; Sierra Leone; Slovenia; Switzerland

United Nations Security Council Resolution 2728, adopted on 25 March 2024, demands an immediate ceasefire in the Gaza war during the month of Ramadan leading to a lasting sustainable ceasefire. It also demands the unconditional release of all hostages. The resolution received approval from 14 members, while the United States abstained from voting.

== Background and procedures ==
Resolution 2728 was proposed by the E-10 (the non-permanent members) and followed the veto of a US draft resolution regarding a ceasefire in Gaza by China and Russia on 22 March 2024.

A verbal amendment introduced by Russia reinserting the word "permanent" to qualify the ceasefire in the resolution's first operative paragraph received 3 votes in favour (Algeria, China, Russia), 11 abstentions and 1 against (United States) and therefore failed to pass due to an insufficient number of members voting in favour of the amendment.

It was reported that the Prime Minister of Israel stated that he would cancel an Israeli delegation trip to the US if it did not veto the resolution.

== Text of the resolution ==
The Security Council,

Guided by the purposes and principles of the Charter of the United Nations,

Recalling all of its relevant resolutions on the situation in the Middle East, including the Palestinian question,

Reiterating its demand that all parties comply with their obligations under international law, including international humanitarian law and international human rights law, and in this regard deploring all attacks against civilians and civilian objects, as well as all violence and hostilities against civilians, and all acts of terrorism, and recalling that the taking of hostages is prohibited under international law,

Expressing deep concern about the catastrophic humanitarian situation in the Gaza Strip,

Acknowledging the ongoing diplomatic efforts by Egypt, Qatar and the United States, aimed at reaching a cessation of hostilities, releasing the hostages and increasing the provision and distribution of humanitarian aid,

1. Demands an immediate ceasefire for the month of Ramadan respected by all parties leading to a lasting sustainable ceasefire, and also demands the immediate and unconditional release of all hostages, as well as ensuring humanitarian access to address their medical and other humanitarian needs, and further demands that the parties comply with their obligations under international law in relation to all persons they detain;
2. Emphasizes the urgent need to expand the flow of humanitarian assistance to and reinforce the protection of civilians in the entire Gaza Strip and reiterates its demand for the lifting of all barriers to the provision of humanitarian assistance at scale, in line with international humanitarian law as well as resolutions 2712 (2023) and 2720 (2023);
3. Decides to remain actively seized of the matter.

== Voting record ==
- Permanent members of the Security Council are in bold.

Approved (14)	Abstained (1)	Opposed (0)
Algeria; **China**; Ecuador; **France**; Guyana; Japan; Mozambique; Malta; **Russia**; Sierra Leone; Slovenia; South Korea; Switzerland; **United Kingdom**	**United States**	

== Reactions ==
=== Nations ===
==== Israel and Palestine ====
- Israel: Prime Minister Benjamin Netanyahu cancelled a delegation trip to the White House to discuss Rafah with a statement released citing "a clear retreat from the consistent US position". They also stated "today’s resolution gives Hamas hope that international pressure will force Israel to accept a ceasefire without the release of our hostages, thus harming both the war effort and the effort to release the hostages." Israel's Minister of National Security Itamar Ben-Gvir argued that the Security Council resolution "proves that the United Nations is anti-Semitic" and that UN Secretary-General "is anti-Semitic". Gilad Erdan, Israel's Permanent Representative to the United Nations, called the resolution "shameless".
- Palestine: Permanent Observer to the UN Riyad Mansour welcomed the resolution whilst calling for its enforcement.
  - Hamas: Hamas welcomed the resolution, stating they were ready "to engage in an immediate prisoner exchange process that leads to the release of prisoners on both sides".

==== Security Council members ====
- China: Ambassador to the UN Zhang Jun stated, "For the millions of people in Gaza who remain mired in an unprecedented humanitarian catastrophe, this resolution, if fully and effectively implemented, could still bring long-awaited hope. Security Council resolutions are binding."
- France: Permanent Representative Nicolas de Rivière stated, "The Security Council's silence on Gaza was becoming deafening. It is high time now for the council to finally contribute to finding a solution".
- Malta: The Ambassador to the UN, Vanessa Frazier, highlighted how this was "the first joint motion [from the non-permanent members] on a geographic situation in the council's history" and that it sent a strong message to world leaders.
- Russia: Permanent Representative Vasily Nebenzya stated, "We believe it is fundamentally important to vote in favour of peace. The council must continue to work on achieving a permanent ceasefire".
- Switzerland: The Federal Council stated in a press release that the resolution "responds to the most urgent needs on the ground and must be implemented immediately". It also highlighted how the "decision by the Council underlines the weight of the non-permanent members of the Council".
- South Korea: At a regular briefing, foreign ministry spokesman Lim Soo-seok said, "We hope that the UNSC resolution will lead to a ceasefire agreement, the release of all hostages and a surge in humanitarian aid." A foreign ministry official said the resolution must be respected and "faithfully implemented as it reflects the consensus of the international community".
- United States: Permanent Representative Linda Thomas-Greenfield thanked members for adding some of the US edits, but also stated the lack of condemnation of Hamas meant it could not support the resolution. She further demanded of the Security Council to link the release of all hostages to any ceasefire, characterizing the resolution as "non-binding". The US State Department noted that the US abstention did not indicate a change in US policy, and also stated that the US saw the ceasefire resolution as nonbinding.

==== Other nations ====
- Australia: Foreign Minister Penny Wong stated "all parties to the conflict must comply" with the resolution.
- Colombia: President Gustavo Petro called on the international community to break diplomatic ties with Israel if it did not comply with the resolution.
- Iran: The Foreign Ministry spokesman stated, "A more important step than adopting this resolution would be effective action to implement it".
- Jordan: Foreign Minister Ayman Safadi stated that the "reaction by the Israeli government reflects the disdain with which it holds international law".
- Lebanon: Prime Minister Najib Mikati called the resolution, "A first step on the path to stopping the Israeli aggression on the Gaza Strip".
- Qatar: The Foreign Ministry stated, "The ministry stresses the importance of committing to implementing the resolution, especially the ceasefire, and allowing humanitarian aid urgently and without obstacles into the entire Gaza Strip".
- South Africa: The Department of International Relations and Cooperation stated, "It is now the responsibility of the United Nations Security Council to ensure that there is compliance with the resolution, which is binding on the parties".
- Spain: Prime Minister Pedro Sánchez said it was "imperative that the resolution be implemented and humanitarian aid access be allowed" into Gaza.
- Turkey: The Foreign Affairs spokesman stated, "We hope that Israel will comply with the requirements of this resolution without delay".

=== Ceasefire negotiations ===
Israel claimed that the rejection of a ceasefire proposal by Hamas was due to the passing of 2728, with Netanyahu stating the Hamas response was a "sad testament to the damage caused by the UN Security Council". The Israeli team at Doha was also recalled. The US rejected the assertions describing them as "inaccurate in almost every respect".

=== Other ===
Responding to the passing of the resolution, Secretary-General António Guterres expressed his desire for implementation, posting that "failure would be unforgivable". In a statement, Doctors Without Borders said, "Council members must ensure that the ceasefire is put into action immediately and doesn’t end up being merely words on paper." The head of Amnesty International stated the Resolution must be "implemented immediately". The Israel-Palestine director of Human Rights Watch stated, "States should use all forms of leverage – including imposing arms embargo and targeted sanctions on Israel – to press it to comply. The lives of millions of Palestinians hang in the balance." The president of the European Commission Ursula von der Leyen stated, "Implementation of this resolution is vital for the protection of all civilians".

== Compliance ==
=== Ceasefire ===
The day following the passage of the resolution, journalist Hind Khoudary reported that the resolution was not honored. Imran Khan, a journalist, wrote, "Israel has a very long history of simply ignoring UN resolutions". On 27 March, James Elder, a spokesperson for UNICEF, stated, "There was so much hope in Gaza after Monday’s call for a ceasefire. That hope, night after night, is being drowned out by bombs".

Benny Gantz, a member of the Israeli war cabinet, stated the resolution had "no operational significance". Robert A. Wood, a U.S. diplomat, stated, "The Israelis saw that resolution, they didn’t like it." Christos Christou, the international president of Doctors Without Borders, "We haven’t seen any change after this resolution on the ground".

=== Hostages ===
Regarding the second demand in operative paragraph 1 of the resolution, on 27 March Khaled Mashaal, the former head of Hamas's politburo, said that the hostages would remain captive until Israel halts hostilities, withdraws its troops, allows displaced civilians to return and ends its blockade of the Gaza Strip.

== See also ==
- List of United Nations Security Council Resolutions 2701 to 2800 (2023–2025)
