= United Nations Security Council Resolution 2730 =

United Nations Security Council Resolution

UN Security Council Resolution 2730
- Date: 24 May 2024
- Meeting no.: 9,634
- Code: S/RES/2730 (Document)
- Subject: Protection of civilians in armed conflict
- Voting summary: 14 voted for; None voted against; 1 abstained
- Result: Adopted

Security Council composition
- Permanent members: China; France; Russia; United Kingdom; United States
- Non-permanent members: Algeria; Ecuador; Guyana; Japan; South Korea; Malta; Mozambique; Sierra Leone; Slovenia; Switzerland

United Nations Security Council Resolution 2730 was adopted on 24 May 2024. According to the resolution, the Security Council voted to protection of humanitarian personnel in armed conflict.

Russia abstained from voting.

== See also ==
- List of United Nations Security Council Resolutions 2701 to 2800 (2023–2025)
