= List of United Nations Security Council Resolutions 2701 to 2800 =

This is a list of United Nations Security Council Resolutions 2701 to 2800 adopted between 19 October 2023 and 13 November 2025.

Resolution	Date	Vote	Concerns
2701	19 October 2023	15–0–0	The situation in Libya
2702	30 October 2023	15–0–0	The situation in Libya
2703	30 October 2023	13–0–2 (abstentions: Mozambique and Russian Federation)	The situation concerning Western Sahara
2704	30 October 2023	15–0–0	Extends Mandate of the United Nations Verification Mission in Colombia
2705	31 October 2023	15–0–0	The situation in Somalia
2706	2 November 2023	15–0–0	The situation in Bosnia and Herzegovina
2707	14 November 2023	15–0–0	The situation in Yemen
2708	14 November 2023	15–0–0	Reports of the Secretary-General on the Sudan and South Sudan
2709	15 November 2023	14–0–1 (abstention: Russian Federation)	The situation in the Central African Republic
2710	15 November 2023	15–0–0	The situation in Somalia
2711	15 November 2023	15–0–0	The situation in Somalia
2712	15 November 2023	12–0–3 (abstentions: Russian Federation, United Kingdom and United States)	Gaza war
2713	1 December 2023	14–0–1 (abstention: France)	Peace and security in Africa
2714	1 December 2023	15–0–0	The situation in Somalia
2715	1 December 2023	14–0–1 (abstention: Russian Federation)	Reports of the Secretary-General on the Sudan and South Sudan
2716	14 December 2023	15–0–0	Threats to international peace and security caused by terrorist acts
2717	19 December 2023	15–0–0	The situation concerning the Democratic Republic of the Congo
2718	21 December 2023	15–0–0	The situation in the Middle East
2719	21 December 2023	15–0–0	Cooperation between the United Nations and regional and subregional organizations in maintaining international peace and security
2720	22 December 2023	13–0–2 (abstentions: Russian Federation and United States)	Gaza humanitarian crisis
2721	29 December 2023	13–0–2 (abstentions: China and Russian Federation)	The situation in Afghanistan
2722	10 January 2024	11–0–4 (abstentions: Algeria, China, Mozambique and Russian Federation)	Maintenance of international peace and security (Red Sea crisis)
2723	30 January 2024	15–0–0	The situation in Cyprus
2724	8 March 2024	14–0–1 (abstention: Russian Federation)	Reports of the Secretary-General on the Sudan and South Sudan
2725	8 March 2024	13–0–2 (abstentions: China and Russian Federation)	Reports of the Secretary-General on the Sudan and South Sudan
2726	14 March 2024	15–0–0	Reports of the Secretary-General on the Sudan and South Sudan
2727	15 March 2024	15–0–0	The situation in Afghanistan
2728	25 March 2024	14–0–1 (abstention: United States)	Ceasefire of the Gaza war
2729	29 April 2024	13–0–2 (abstentions: China and Russian Federation)	Reports of the Secretary-General on the Sudan and South Sudan
2730	24 May 2024	14–0–1 (abstention: Russian Federation)	Protection of civilians in armed conflict
2731	30 May 2024	9–0–6 (abstentions: Algeria, China, Guyana, Mozambique, Russian Federation and Sierra Leone)	Reports of the Secretary-General on the Sudan and South Sudan
2732	31 May 2024	15–0–0	The situation concerning Iraq
2733	31 May 2024	9–0–6 (abstentions: Algeria, China, Guyana, Mozambique, Russian Federation and Sierra Leone)	The situation in Libya
2734	10 June 2024	14–0–1 (abstention: Russian Federation)	Threats to international peace and security caused by terrorist acts
2735	10 June 2024	14–0–1 (abstention: Russian Federation)	Ceasefire of the Gaza war
2736	13 June 2024	14–0–1 (abstention: Russian Federation)	Reports of the Secretary-General on the Sudan and South Sudan
2737	27 June 2024	15–0–0	The situation in the Middle East
2738	27 June 2024	15–0–0	The situation concerning the Democratic Republic of the Congo
2739	27 June 2024	12–0–3 (abstentions: Algeria, China and Russian Federation)	Maintenance of international peace and security
2740	27 June 2024	14–0–1 (abstention: Russian Federation)	International Residual Mechanism for Criminal Tribunals
2741	28 June 2024	15–0–0	The situation in Somalia
2742	8 July 2024	15–0–0	The situation in Yemen
2743	12 July 2024	15–0–0	The question concerning Haiti
2744	19 July 2024	15–0–0	General issues relating to sanctions
2745	30 July 2024	15–0–0	Peace and security in Africa
2746	6 August 2024	15–0–0	The situation concerning the Democratic Republic of the Congo
2747	12 August 2024	15–0–0	The situation in Somalia
2748	15 August 2024	15–0–0	The situation in Somalia
2749	28 August 2024	15–0–0	The situation in Lebanon
2750	11 September 2024	15–0–0	Reports of the Secretary-General on the Sudan and South Sudan
2751	30 September 2024	15–0–0	The question concerning Haiti
2752	18 October 2024	15–0–0	The question concerning Haiti
2753	30 October 2024	15–0–0	The situation in Somalia
2754	30 October 2024	15–0–0	Extends Mandate of the United Nations Verification Mission in Colombia
2755	31 October 2024	15–0–0	The situation in Libya
2756	31 October 2024	12–0–2 (abstentions: Mozambique and Russian Federation; Algeria did not participate)	The situation concerning Western Sahara
2757	1 November 2024	15–0–0	The situation in Bosnia and Herzegovina
2758	13 November 2024	15–0–0	The situation in Yemen
2759	14 November 2024	15–0–0	The situation in the Central African Republic
2760	14 November 2024	14–0–1 (abstention: Russian Federation)	Reports of the Secretary-General on the Sudan and South Sudan
2761	6 December 2024	15–0–0	General issues relating to sanctions
2762	13 December 2024	15–0–0	Peace and security in Africa
2763	13 December 2024	15–0–0	Threats to international peace and security caused by terrorist acts
2764	20 December 2024	15–0–0	Children and armed conflict
2765	20 December 2024	15–0–0	The situation concerning the Democratic Republic of the Congo
2766	20 December 2024	15–0–0	The situation in the Middle East
2767	27 December 2024	14–0–1 (abstention: United States)	The situation in Somalia
2768	15 January 2025	12–0–3 (abstentions: Algeria, China and Russian Federation)	Maintenance of international peace and security
2769	16 January 2025	14–0–1 (abstention: Russian Federation)	The situation in Libya
2770	24 January 2025	15–0–0	Date of election to fill a vacancy in the International Court of Justice
2771	31 January 2025	15–0–0	The situation in Cyprus
2772	17 February 2025	13–0–2 (abstentions: China and Russian Federation)	Reports of the Secretary-General on the Sudan and South Sudan
2773	21 February 2025	15–0–0	The situation concerning the Democratic Republic of the Congo
2774	24 February 2025	10–0–5 (abstentions: Denmark, France, Greece, Slovenia and United Kingdom)	Maintenance of peace and security of Ukraine
2775	28 February 2025	15–0–0	Peace and security in Africa
2776	3 March 2025	15–0–0	Peace and security in Africa
2777	17 March 2025	15–0–0	The situation in Afghanistan
2778	30 April 2025	15–0–0	Reports of the Secretary-General on the Sudan and South Sudan
2779	8 May 2025	12–0–3 (abstentions: China, Pakistan and Russian Federation)	Reports of the Secretary-General on the Sudan and South Sudan
2780	29 May 2025	13–0–2 (abstentions: China and Russian Federation)	The situation in Libya
2781	30 May 2025	9–0–6 (abstentions: Algeria, China, Pakistan, Russian Federation, Sierra Leone and Somalia)	Reports of the Secretary-General on the Sudan and South Sudan
2782	30 June 2025	15–0–0	The situation in the Middle East
2783	30 June 2025	15–0–0	The situation concerning the Democratic Republic of the Congo
2784	2 July 2025	15–0–0	Date of election to fill a vacancy in the International Court of Justice
2785	14 July 2025	15–0–0	The question concerning Haiti
2786	14 July 2025	15–0–0	The situation in Yemen
2787	15 July 2025	12–0–3 (abstentions: Algeria, China and Russian Federation)	Maintenance of international peace and security
2788	22 July 2025	15–0–0	Maintenance of international peace and security
2789	29 July 2025	15–0–0	Peace and security in Africa
2790	28 August 2025	15–0–0	The situation in Lebanon
2791	12 September 2025	15–0–0	Reports of the Secretary-General on the Sudan and South Sudan
2792	17 September 2025	15–0–0	The situation between Iraq and Kuwait
2793	30 September 2025	12–0–3 (abstentions: China, Pakistan and Russian Federation)	The question concerning Haiti
2794	17 October 2025	15–0–0	The question concerning Haiti
2795	31 October 2025	15–0–0	The situation in Bosnia and Herzegovina
2796	31 October 2025	15–0–0	The situation in Libya
2797	31 October 2025	11–0–3 (abstentions: China, Pakistan and Russian Federation; Algeria did not participate)	The situation concerning Western Sahara
2798	31 October 2025	13–0–2 (abstentions: Russian Federation and United States)	Extends Mandate of the United Nations Verification Mission in Colombia
2799	6 November 2025	14–0–1 (abstention: China)	Threats to international peace and security caused by terrorist acts
2800	13 November 2025	14–0–1 (abstention: United States)	The situation in the Central African Republic

== See also ==
- Lists of United Nations Security Council resolutions
- List of United Nations Security Council Resolutions 2601 to 2700
- List of United Nations Security Council Resolutions 2801 to 2900
