= United Nations Security Council Resolution 2736 =

United Nations Security Council Resolution

UN Security Council Resolution 2736
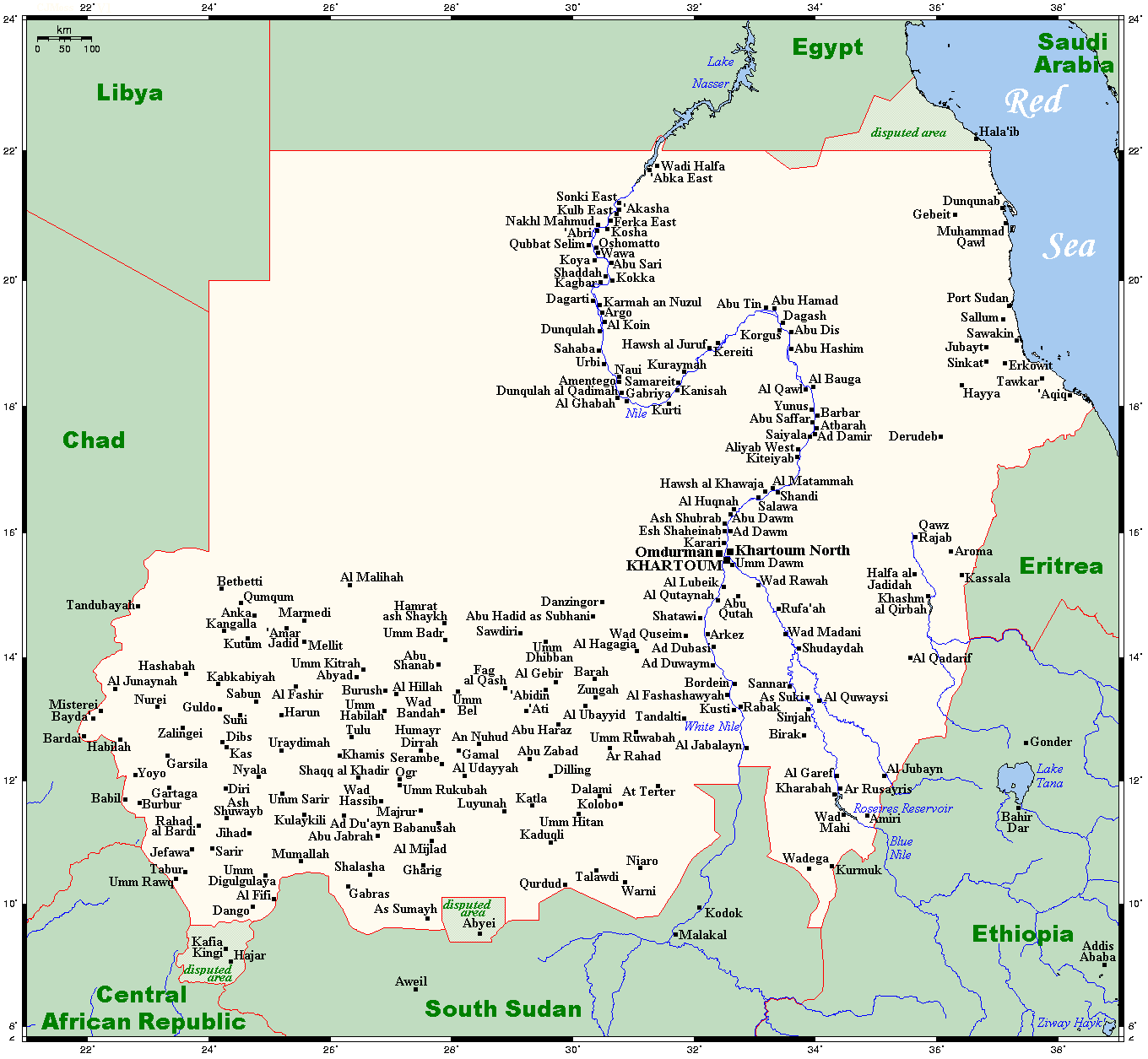
- Map of Sudan
- Date: 13 June 2024
- Code: S/RES/2736 (Document)
- Subject: Halting of paramilitary siege of El Fasher in North Darfur, Sudan
- Voting summary: 14 voted for; None voted against; 1 abstained
- Result: Adopted

Security Council composition
- Permanent members: China; France; Russia; United Kingdom; United States
- Non-permanent members: Algeria; Ecuador; Guyana; Japan; South Korea; Malta; Mozambique; Sierra Leone; Slovenia; Switzerland

United Nations Security Council Resolution 2736, adopted on 13 June 2024, demands that the Rapid Support Forces (RSF) paramilitary group in Sudan halt a siege and de-escalate fighting in North Darfur's capital Al-Fashir. It also demands that parties involved in the fighting to adhere to international humanitarian law, by protecting civilians and healthcare from conflict, to provide humanitarian access to any civilians impacted by the civil war, to allow civilians to move in and out of Al-Fashir to safer areas, and to re-open a border crossing between Chad and Darfur for humanitarian aid.

== Background ==
Conflicts that erupted from the Sudanese Civil War that began in April 2023 have led to significant casualties and humanitarian disasters, including the deaths of 16,650 from the start of the conflict to 17 May 2024.

Fighting near Al-Fashir, the only capital in Darfur not currently held by the Rapid Support Forces paramilitary organization, escalated with numerous reports of indiscriminate killing of civilians and destruction of infrastructure. The fighting has led to attacks on many healthcare facilities and vehicles, forcing them to shut down and exacerbating worsening conditions for civilians.

== Negotiations ==
The initial resolution draft was proposed by the United Kingdom, and in later drafts wished to maintain the focus of the resolution on Al-Fashir due to its very high concentration of violence. Russia called the resolution an "excessive reaction" to the conflicts occurring in Sudan, and instead proposed issuing a press statement. Russia also opposed referring to Sudanese authorities to the same level as any other Sudanese entity for border control and humanitarian access since it argued that Sudanese authorities should be the only party responsible for coordinating aid distribution. However, some other members maintained that the draft text should reference all parties to the conflict to broaden the scope of all actors needed to facilitate humanitarian aid.

France added that the resolution should mention withdrawing fighters in order to enable agricultural activities during the planting season to lower famine risk. China and Russia suggested replacing the language "Sudanese authorities" with "Sudanese government", which was declined. China and Russia were also reluctant to include language suggested by the US to re-open the Adre border crossing between Sudan and Chad, retorting that the resolution needed to "respect the sovereignty of the host country" and its border access.

== See also ==
- List of United Nations Security Council Resolutions 2701 to 2800 (2023–2025)
