= United Nations Security Council Resolution 2725 =

United Nations Security Council Resolution

UN Security Council Resolution 2725
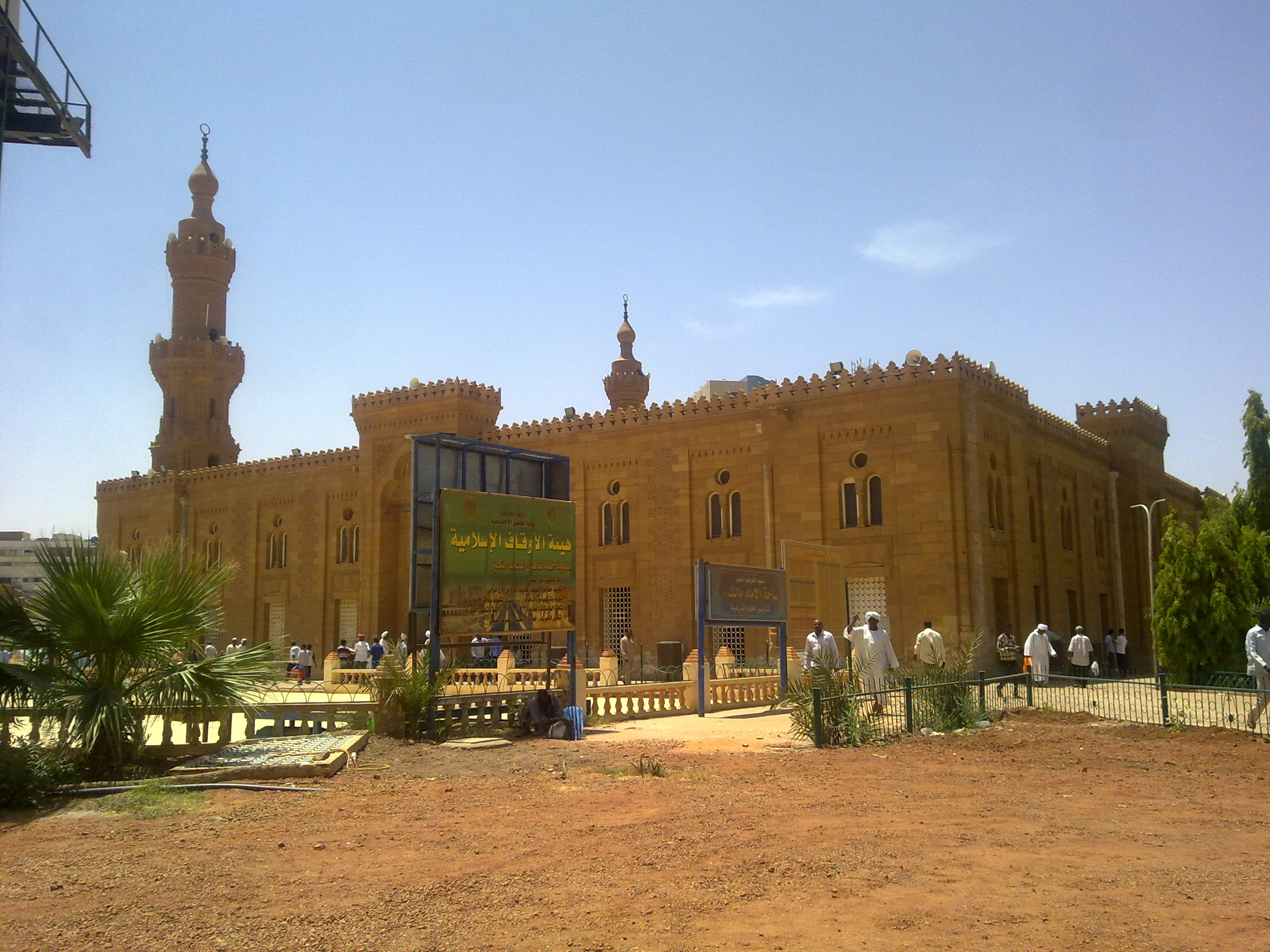
- Khartoum Mosque
- Date: 8 March 2024
- Meeting no.: 9,569
- Code: S/RES/2725 (Document)
- Subject: Reports of the Secretary-General on the Sudan and South Sudan
- Voting summary: 13 voted for; None voted against; 2 abstained
- Result: Adopted

Security Council composition
- Permanent members: China; France; Russia; United Kingdom; United States
- Non-permanent members: Algeria; Ecuador; Guyana; Japan; South Korea; Malta; Mozambique; Sierra Leone; Slovenia; Switzerland

United Nations Security Council Resolution 2725 was adopted on 8 March 2024. According to the resolution, the United Nations Security Council voted to renew the mandate of Panel of Experts monitoring the Sudan sanctions regime until 12 March 2025

China and Russia abstained from voting.

== See also ==
- List of United Nations Security Council Resolutions 2701 to 2800 (2023–2025)
