= United Nations Security Council Resolution 2724 =

United Nations Security Council Resolution

UN Security Council Resolution 2724
- Flag of Sudan
- Date: 8 March 2024
- Meeting no.: 9,568
- Code: S/RES/2724 (Document)
- Subject: Reports of the Secretary-General on the Sudan and South Sudan
- Voting summary: 14 voted for; None voted against; 1 abstained
- Result: Adopted

Security Council composition
- Permanent members: China; France; Russia; United Kingdom; United States
- Non-permanent members: Algeria; Ecuador; Guyana; Japan; South Korea; Malta; Mozambique; Sierra Leone; Slovenia; Switzerland

United Nations Security Council Resolution 2724 was adopted on 8 March 2024. According to the resolution, the United Nations Security Council voted to immediate cessation of hostilities in Sudan during the holy month of Ramadan.

Russia abstained from voting.

== See also ==
- List of United Nations Security Council Resolutions 2701 to 2800 (2023–2025)
