= United Nations Security Council Resolution 2749 =

UN Security Council Resolution 2749
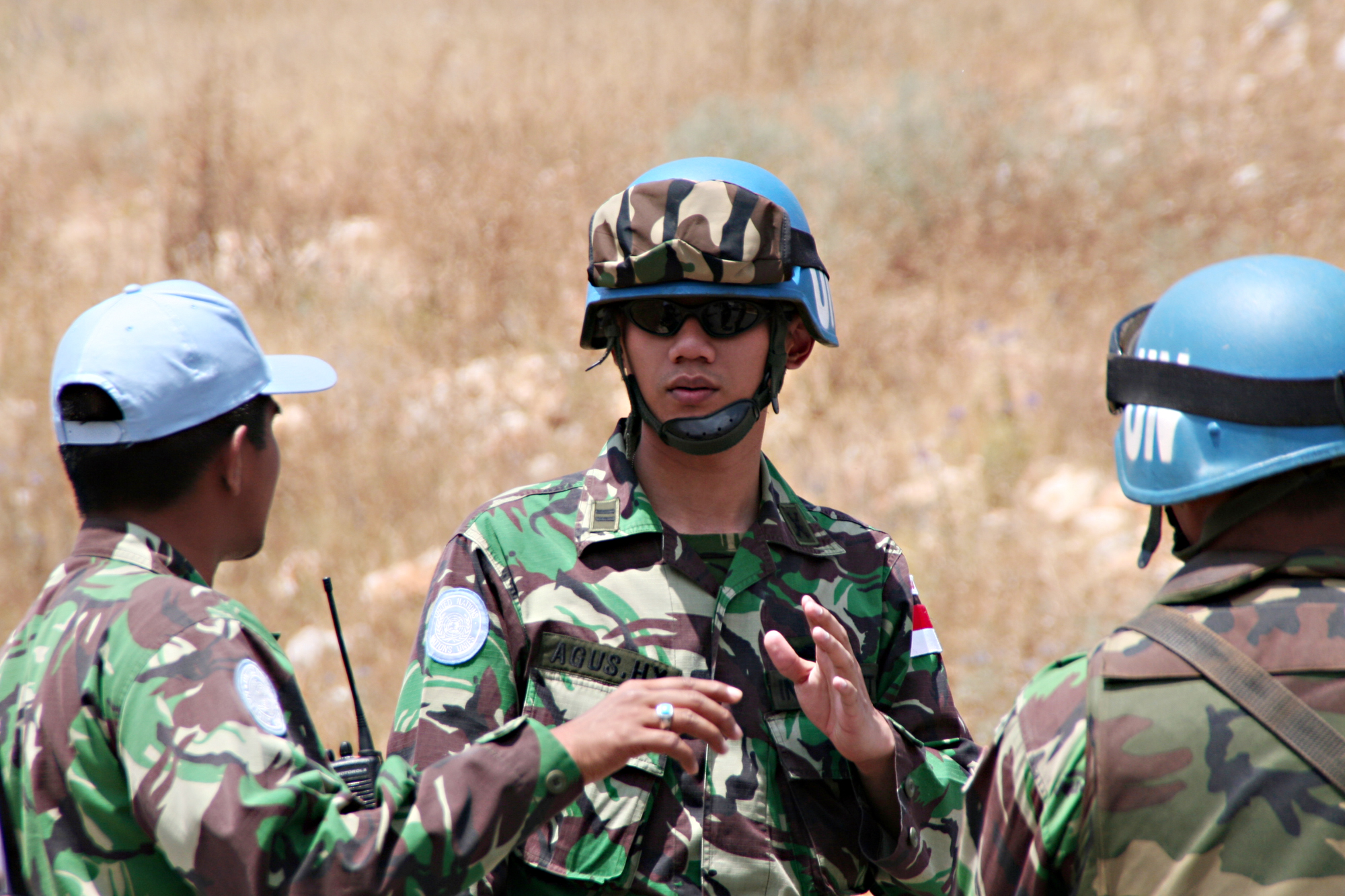
- UNIFIL forces in Lebanon
- Date: 28 August 2024
- Meeting no.: 9,712
- Code: S/RES/2749 (Document)
- Subject: The situation in Lebanon
- Voting summary: 15 voted for; None voted against; None abstained
- Result: Adopted

Security Council composition
- Permanent members: China; France; Russia; United Kingdom; United States
- Non-permanent members: Algeria; Ecuador; Guyana; Japan; South Korea; Malta; Mozambique; Sierra Leone; Slovenia; Switzerland

United Nations Security Council Resolution 2749 was adopted on 28 August 2024. According to the resolution, the Security Council voted to extend the mandate of United Nations Interim Force in Lebanon (UNIFIL) until 31 August 2025.

All fifteen members of the Council voted unanimously in favor.

== See also ==
- List of United Nations Security Council Resolutions 2701 to 2800 (2023-)
- United Nations Security Council Resolution 1701
