= United Nations Security Council Resolution 2713 =

United Nations Security Council Resolution

UN Security Council Resolution 2713
- Map of Africa
- Date: 1 December 2023
- Meeting no.: 9,490
- Code: S/RES/2713 (Document)
- Subject: Peace and security in Africa
- Voting summary: 14 voted for; None voted against; 1 abstained
- Result: Adopted

Security Council composition
- Permanent members: China; France; Russia; United Kingdom; United States
- Non-permanent members: Albania; Brazil; Ecuador; Gabon; Ghana; Japan; Malta; Mozambique; Switzerland; United Arab Emirates

United Nations Security Council Resolution 2713 was adopted on 1 December 2023. According to the resolution, the Security Council voted to renew the sanctions regime on Somalia-based Al-Shabaab until 15 December 2024.

France abstained from voting.

== See also ==
- List of United Nations Security Council Resolutions 2701 to 2800 (2023–2025)
