= United Nations Security Council Resolution 2703 =

United Nations Security Council Resolution

UN Security Council Resolution 2703
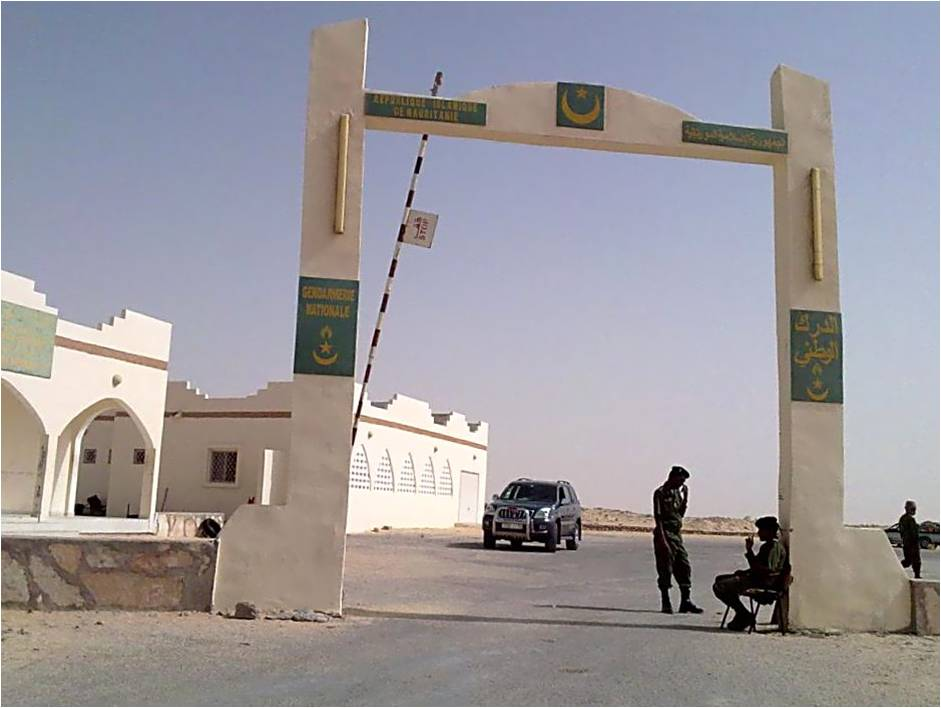
- Border between Mauritania and Western Sahara
- Date: 30 October 2023
- Meeting no.: 9,460
- Code: S/RES/2703 (Document)
- Subject: The situation concerning Western Sahara
- Voting summary: 13 voted for; None voted against; 2 abstained
- Result: Adopted

Security Council composition
- Permanent members: China; France; Russia; United Kingdom; United States
- Non-permanent members: Albania; Brazil; Ecuador; Gabon; Ghana; Japan; Malta; Mozambique; Switzerland; United Arab Emirates

United Nations Security Council Resolution 2703 was adopted on 30 October 2023. According to the resolution, the Security Council voted to extend the mandate of United Nations Mission for the Referendum in Western Sahara (MINURSO) until 31 October 2024.

Thirteen members of the Council voted in favor, while Mozambique and Russia abstained.

== See also ==
- List of United Nations Security Council Resolutions 2701 to 2800 (2023–2025)
