= United Nations Security Council Resolution 2793 =

United Nations Security Council Resolution

UN Security Council Resolution 2793
- Date: 30 September 2025
- Meeting no.: 10,009
- Code: S/RES/2793 (Document)
- Subject: The question concerning Haiti
- Voting summary: 12 voted for; None voted against; 3 abstained
- Result: Adopted

Security Council composition
- Permanent members: China; France; Russia; United Kingdom; United States
- Non-permanent members: Algeria; Denmark; Greece; Guyana; South Korea; Pakistan; Panama; Sierra Leone; Slovenia; Somalia

United Nations Security Council Resolution 2793 was adopted on 30 September 2025. According to the resolution, the United Nations Security Council voted to renew an Multinational Security Support (MSS) mission in Haiti to the Gang Suppression Force until 30 September 2026.

China, Pakistan and Russia abstained from voting.

== See also ==
- List of United Nations Security Council Resolutions 2701 to 2800 (2023–2025)
