= United Nations Security Council Resolution 2720 =

UN Security Council Resolution 2720
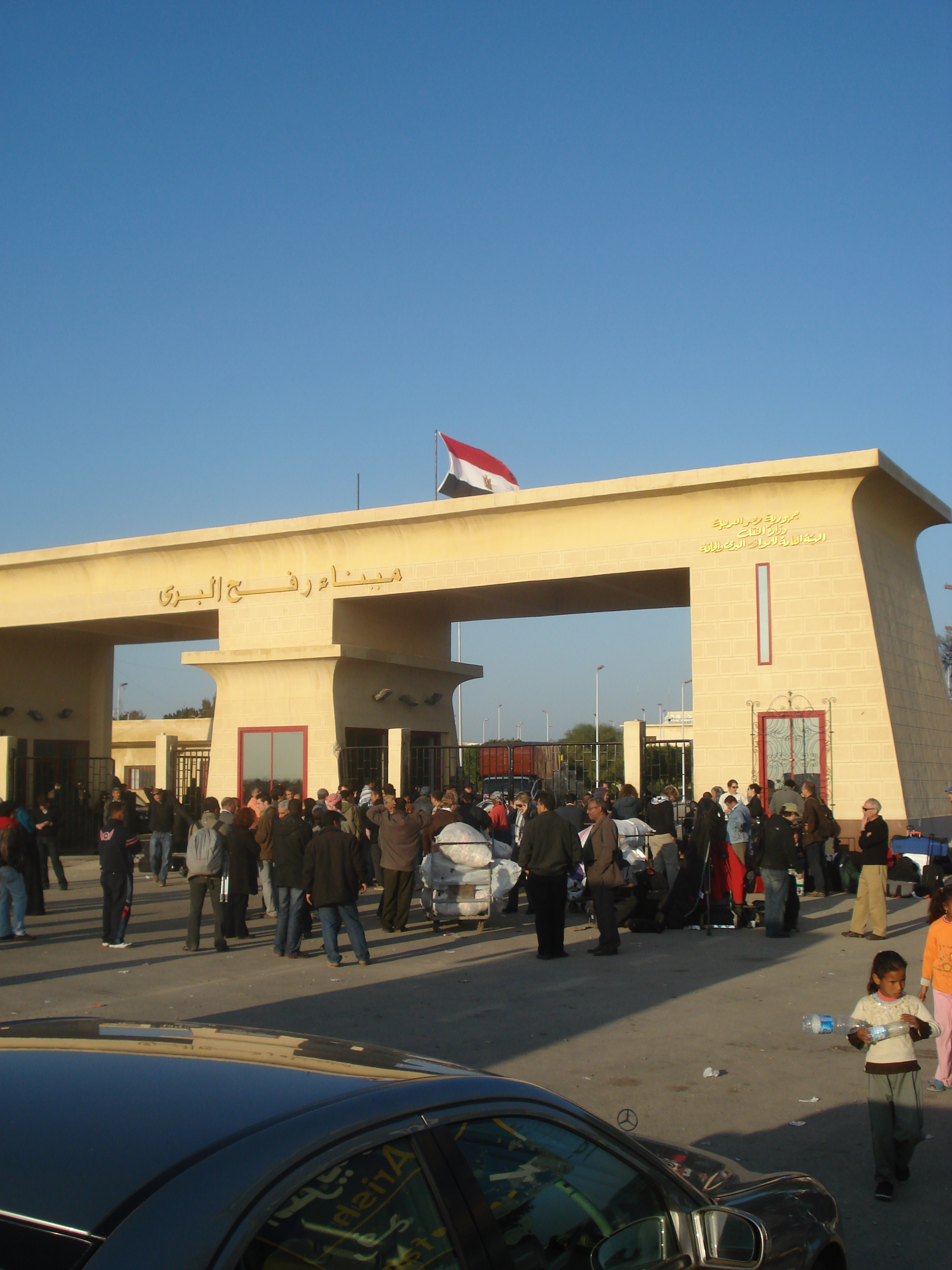
- Rafah Border Crossing
- Date: 22 December 2023
- Meeting no.: 9,520
- Subject: 2023 Gaza humanitarian crisis
- Voting summary: 13 voted for; None voted against; 2 abstained
- Result: Adopted

Security Council composition
- Permanent members: China; France; Russia; United Kingdom; United States
- Non-permanent members: Albania; Brazil; Ecuador; Gabon; Ghana; Japan; Malta; Mozambique; Switzerland; United Arab Emirates

United Nations Security Council Resolution 2720, adopted on 22 December 2023, called for increased aid for the ongoing Gaza humanitarian crisis, including the provisioning of fuel, food, and medical supplies. It also explicitly demanded the opening of all Gaza border crossings to humanitarian aid, including the Kerem Shalom border crossing, and proposed the immediate appointment of a Senior Humanitarian and Reconstruction Coordinator for Gaza. The resolution received approval from 13 members, while Russia and the United States abstained from voting.

== Background ==
The Gaza Strip has been experiencing a humanitarian crisis since the blockade of the Gaza Strip in 2005, a crisis which has been exasperated as a result of the Gaza war. At the start of the war, Israel implemented a complete blockade on the Gaza Strip, which has resulted in significant shortages of fuel, food, medication, water, and essential medical supplies. This siege resulted in a 90% drop in electricity availability, impacting hospital power supplies, sewage plants, and shutting down the desalination plants that provide drinking water. Widespread disease outbreaks have spread across Gaza.

Heavy bombardment by Israeli airstrikes caused catastrophic damage to Gaza's infrastructure, further deepening the crisis. The Gaza Health Ministry reported over 4,000 children killed in the war's first month. UN Secretary-General António Guterres stated Gaza had "become a graveyard for children". (Note: Israeli UN Ambassador Gilad Erdan responded directly to Guterres, stating, "Shame on [Guterres]... More than 30 minors – among them a 9 month-old baby as well as toddlers and children who witnessed their parents being murdered in cold blood – are being held against their will in the Gaza Strip. Hamas is the problem in Gaza, not Israel's actions to eliminate this terrorist organization.")

== Procedures ==
Security Council Resolution 2712 was adopted on 15 November 2023, calling for humanitarian pauses in the fighting, and the 2023 Gaza war ceasefire took effect from 24 to 30 November.

The United Nations General Assembly passed (on 12 December 2023) a non-binding resolution with a repeated calling for an "immediate ceasefire" with 153 votes for, 23 abstentions and 10 against.

Resolution 2720, proposed by the UAE, was originally scheduled for a vote on Monday 18 December; however, was delayed multiple times to allow for negotiations with the United States which would allow for the U.S. to not veto the resolution. It was reported that the reason for the delay was differences between the State Department and the White House. The United States expressed reservation with the proposition for a U.N. monitored mechanisms for aid delivery, whereas the United Kingdom explicitly endorsed the resolution.

An amendment introduced by Russia, which would have reinstated the previous draft of the resolution that called for an "urgent suspension of hostilities", received 10 votes in favour and 4 abstentions but was vetoed by the United States.

== Voting record ==
- Permanent members of the Security Council are in bold.

Approved (13)	Abstained (2)	Opposed (0)
Albania; Brazil; **China**; Ecuador; **France**; Gabon; Ghana; Japan; Malta; Mozambique; Switzerland; United Arab Emirates; **United Kingdom**	**Russia**; **United States**	

== Reactions ==
=== National representatives ===
- China: The Chinese ambassador to the U.N. Dai Bing welcomed the adoption of resolution but criticized its shortcomings and advocated for the "full use of Karem Shalom and the opening of other crossing points".
- Egypt: The Egyptian ambassador to the U.N. Osama Mahmoud Abdelkhalek Mahmoud welcomed the resolution as “a step in the right direction”.
- Israel: The government of Israel thanked the U.S. government for its support prior to the UN vote and foreign minister Eli Cohen stated that "Israel will continue to inspect, for security reasons, all humanitarian assistance to Gaza". The Israeli ambassador to the U.N. criticized the resolution as "disconnected from reality", and reiterated concerns that the UN had still not "issue[d] a single statement condemning Hamas and their atrocities".
- Palestine: The Palestinian permanent observer to the U.N. Riyad Mansour declared that the "resolution is a step in the right direction. It must be implemented and must be accompanied by massive pressure for an immediate ceasefire".
- Russia: The Russian ambassador to the U.N. Vasily Nebenzya criticized the resolution stating that the U.S. engaged in "blackmail" and made the resolution "toothless". It further stated that it was a "license to kill" and those that voted in favour would be complicit in the situation and that Russia would have vetoed the resolution were it not for the backing of Arab states.
- U.S.: The U.S. ambassador to the U.N. Linda Thomas-Greenfield stated that the passage acted as a "glimmer of hope" and that it was "a very strong resolution", whilst also saying that the U.S. was "appalled" at the lack of condemnation of Hamas.

=== Other reactions ===
Many organisations, including the International Rescue Committee, criticized the resolution due to the lack of a call for an immediate ceasefire, whilst Médecins Sans Frontières executive director Avril Benoît declared that the resolution "has been watered down to the point that its impact on the lives of civilians in Gaza will be nearly meaningless". South Africa, in a statement referring Israel to the International Court of Justice for committing genocide and violating the Genocide Convention, called the resolution "ineffectual" and failing to "properly to address the situation on the ground" in Gaza.

== Impact ==
On 29 December, Al Jazeera reported a "sense of frustration" in Gaza following the passage of the resolution, stating that "People are now seeing more bombs, less food, and less humanitarian aid." In March 2024, the Palestinian Foreign Ministry stated, "The failure of the Security Council to implement Resolution 2720 and its inability to guarantee the entry of humanitarian and medical aid on a constant basis to civilians in the Gaza Strip has no justification".

== See also ==
- List of United Nations Security Council Resolutions 2701 to 2800 (2023–2025)
- List of United Nations resolutions concerning Palestine
- List of United Nations resolutions concerning Israel
- United Nations Security Council Resolution 2712
- United Nations Security Council Resolution 1701
