= United Nations Security Council Resolution 2781 =

United Nations Security Council Resolution

UN Security Council Resolution 2781
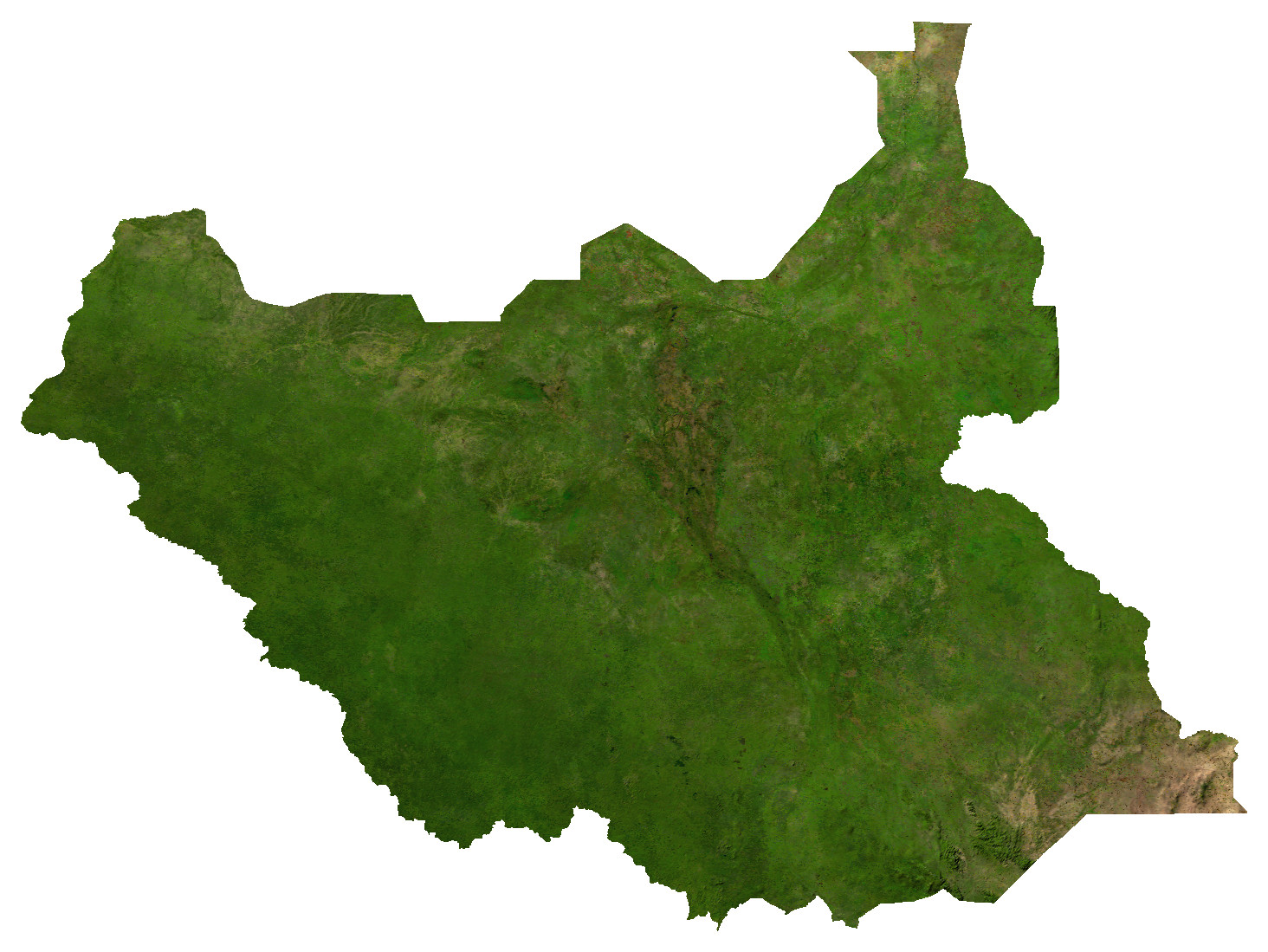
- Map of South Sudan
- Date: 30 May 2025
- Meeting no.: 9,928
- Code: S/RES/2781 (Document)
- Subject: Reports of the Secretary-General on the Sudan and South Sudan
- Voting summary: 9 voted for; None voted against; 6 abstained
- Result: Adopted

Security Council composition
- Permanent members: China; France; Russia; United Kingdom; United States
- Non-permanent members: Algeria; Denmark; Greece; Guyana; South Korea; Pakistan; Panama; Sierra Leone; Slovenia; Somalia

United Nations Security Council Resolution 2781 was adopted on 30 May 2025. According to the resolution, the United Nations Security Council voted to renew an arms embargo against South Sudan until 31 May 2026.

China, Algeria, Somalia, Pakistan, Sierra Leone and Russia abstained from voting.

== See also ==
- List of United Nations Security Council Resolutions 2701 to 2800 (2023–2025)
