= United Nations Security Council Resolution 2799 =

United Nations Security Council Resolution

UN Security Council Resolution 2799
- Date: 6 November 2025
- Meeting no.: 10,036
- Code: S/RES/2799 (Document)
- Subject: Threats to international peace and security caused by terrorist acts
- Voting summary: 14 voted for; None voted against; 1 abstained
- Result: Adopted

Security Council composition
- Permanent members: China; France; Russia; United Kingdom; United States
- Non-permanent members: Algeria; Denmark; Greece; Guyana; South Korea; Pakistan; Panama; Sierra Leone; Slovenia; Somalia

United Nations Security Council Resolution 2799 was adopted on 6 November 2025 under Chapter VII of the United Nations Charter. In this resolution, which recalled Resolution 2254 (2015), the Security Council decided to remove two individuals from the ISIL (Da'esh) and Al-Qaida Sanctions List, including the Syrian president Ahmed al-Sharaa, and the Interior Minister, Anas Khattab. China abstained from the vote.

The resolution was based on changes in circumstances and on commitments made by the transitional government to combat terrorism and to uphold human rights.

== See also ==
- List of United Nations Security Council Resolutions 2701 to 2800 (2023–2025)
