= United Nations Security Council Resolution 2712 =

UN Security Council Resolution 2712
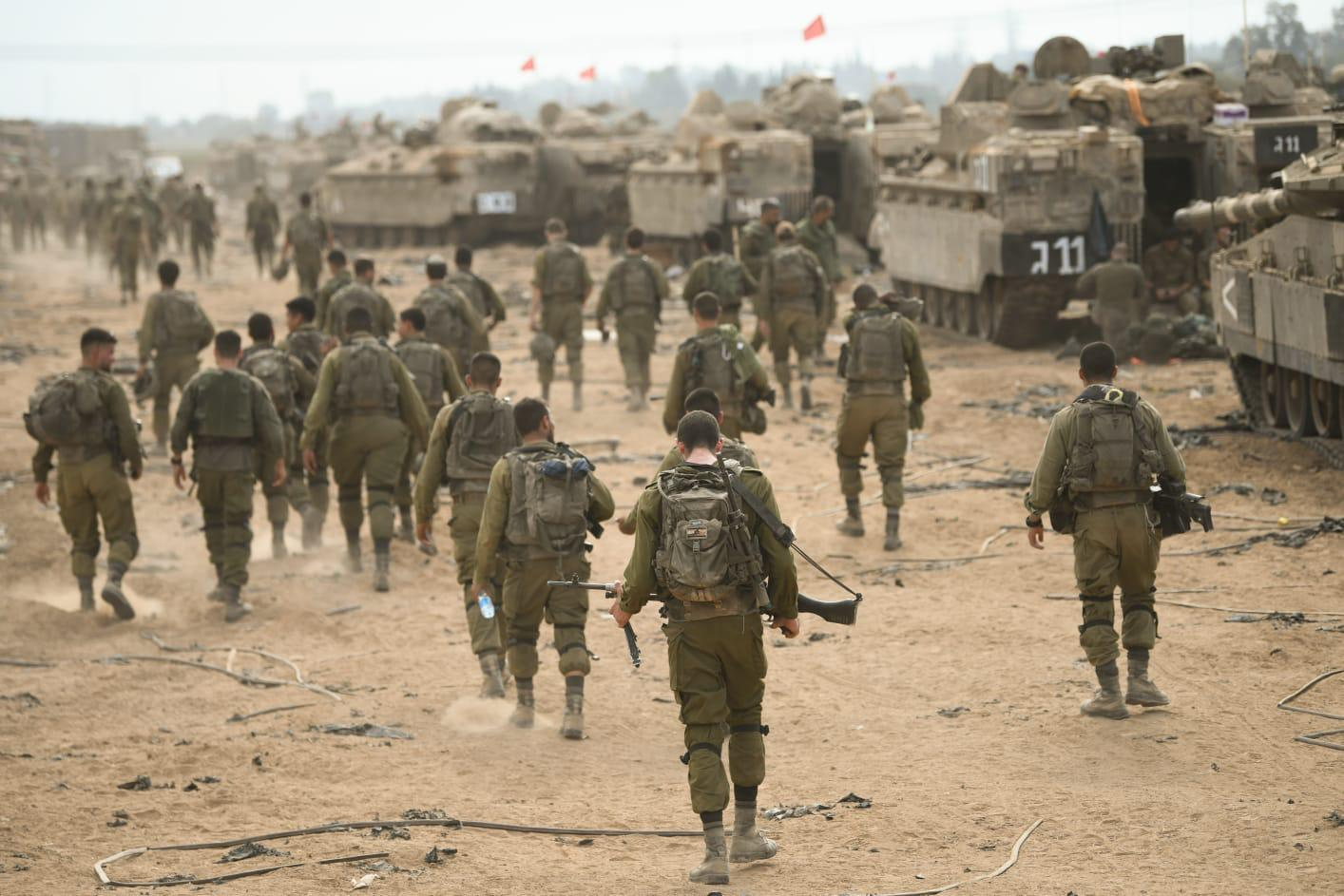
- IDF soldiers preparing for a ground operation in Gaza on 29 October 2023
- Date: 15 November 2023
- Meeting no.: 9,479
- Code: S/RES/2712 (Document)
- Subject: Gaza war
- Voting summary: 12 voted for; None voted against; 3 abstained
- Result: Adopted

Security Council composition
- Permanent members: China; France; Russia; United Kingdom; United States
- Non-permanent members: Albania; Brazil; Ecuador; Gabon; Ghana; Japan; Malta; Mozambique; Switzerland; United Arab Emirates

United Nations Security Council Resolution 2712, adopted on 15 November 2023, called for humanitarian pauses and corridors in Gaza during the Gaza war. The resolution received approval from 12 members, while Russia, the United Kingdom, and the United States abstained from voting.

== Voting ==
Approved (12)	Abstained (3)	Opposed (0)
Albania; Brazil; **China**; Ecuador; **France**; Gabon; Ghana; Japan; Malta; Mozambique; Switzerland; United Arab Emirates	**Russia**; **United Kingdom**; **United States**	

- Permanent members of the Security Council are in bold.

== Aftermath ==
Following the passing of the resolution, pressures were building on the Israeli government to implement a ceasefire with Hamas in order to allow for a prisoners' exchange, which led to a ceasefire starting on 24 November.

The ceasefire ended on 30 November with the resumption of combat operations in the Gaza Strip.

== See also ==
- List of United Nations Security Council Resolutions 2701 to 2800 (2023–2025)
- List of United Nations resolutions concerning Israel
- List of United Nations resolutions concerning Palestine
- United Nations Security Council Resolution 2720
