= Judges of the International Court of Justice =

The first list lists the permanent judges of the International Court of Justice, the main judicial organ of the United Nations. The second list lists the judges appointed ad hoc by a party to a proceeding before the Court pursuant to Article 31 of the Statute of the International Court of Justice.

== Permanent judges ==
Judges of the International Court of Justice, as of 12 November 2025
State	Judge	Terms start	Term end	President	Vice-president
El Salvador	José Gustavo Guerrero	1946	1958	1946–1949	1949–1955
France	Jules Basdevant	1946	1964	1949–1952	1946–1949
Chile	Alejandro Álvarez	1946	1955		
Mexico	Isidro Fabela	1946	1952		
United States	Green Hackworth	1946	1961	1955–1958	
(Polish People's Republic) Poland	Bohdan Winiarski	1946	1967	1961–1964	
(Socialist Federal Republic of Yugoslavia) Yugoslavia	Milovan Zoričić	1946	1958		
Belgium	Charles De Visscher	1946	1952		
United Kingdom	Arnold McNair, 1st Baron McNair	1946	1955	1952–1955	
Norway	Helge Klæstad	1946	1961	1958–1961	
Egypt	Abdul Badawi Pasha	1946	1965		1955–1958
Soviet Union	Sergey Krylov	1946	1952		
Canada	John Read	1946	1958		
China	Hsu Mo	1946	1956		
Brazil	Philadelpho Azevedo	1946	1951		
Brazil	Levi Carneiro	1951	1955		
India	Sir Benegal Narsing Rau	1952	1953		
Uruguay	Enrique Armand-Ugón	1952	1961		
Soviet Union	Sergey Golunsky	1952	1953		
Soviet Union	Fyodor Kozhevnikov	1953	1961		
Pakistan	Muhammad Zafarullah Khan	1954; 1964	1961; 1973	1970–1973	1958–1961
United Kingdom	Hersch Lauterpacht	1955	1960		
Argentina	Lucio Moreno Quintana	1955	1964		
Mexico	Roberto Córdova	1955	1964		
China	Wellington Koo	1957	1967		1964–1967
Greece	Jean Spiropoulos	1958	1967		
Australia	Sir Percy Spender	1958	1967	1964–1967	
Panama	Ricardo Alfaro	1959	1964		1961–1964
United Kingdom	Sir Gerald Fitzmaurice	1960	1973		
Soviet Union	Vladimir Koretsky	1961	1970		1967–1970
Japan	Kōtarō Tanaka	1961	1970		
Peru	José Bustamante y Rivero	1961	1970	1967–1970	
United States	Philip Jessup	1961	1970		
Italy	Gaetano Morelli	1961	1970		
Mexico	Luis Padilla Nervo	1964	1973		
Senegal	Isaac Forster	1964	1982		
France	André Gros	1964	1982		
Lebanon	Fouad Ammoun	1965	1976		1970–1976
Philippines	César Bengzon	1967	1976		
Sweden	Sture Petrén	1967	1976		
Poland	Manfred Lachs	1967	1993	1973–1976	
Nigeria	Charles Onyeama	1967	1976		
United States	Hardy Dillard	1970	1979		
(People's Republic of Benin) Benin/Dahomey	Louis Ignacio-Pinto	1970	1979		
Spain	Federico de Castro	1970	1979		
Soviet Union	Platon Dmitriejevitsj Morozov	1970	1985		
Uruguay	Eduardo Jiménez de Aréchaga	1970	1979	1976–1979	
United Kingdom	Sir Humphrey Waldock	1973	1981	1979–1981	
India	Nagendra Singh	1973	1988	1985–1988	1976–1979
Argentina	José Ruda	1973	1991	1988–1991	
West Germany	Hermann Mosler	1976	1985		
Nigeria	Taslim Elias	1976	1991	1982–1985	1979–1982
Syria	Salah el-Dine Tarazi	1976	1980		
Japan	Shigeru Oda	1976	2003		1991–1994
Italy	Roberto Ago	1979	1995		
Egypt	Abdullah El-Erian	1979	1981		
Brazil	José Sette Câmara Filho	1979	1988		1982–1985
United States	Richard Reeve Baxter	1979	1980		
Syria	Abdallah El-Khani	1981	1985		
United States	Stephen Schwebel	1981	2000	1997–2000	1994–1997
United Kingdom	Sir Robert Jennings	1982	1995	1991–1994	
France	Guy Ladreit de Lacharrière	1982	1987		1985–1987
Senegal	Kéba Mbaye	1982	1991		1987–1991
Algeria	Mohammed Bedjaoui	1982	2001	1994–1997	
China	Ni Zhengyu	1985	1994		
Norway	Jens Evensen	1985	1994		
Soviet Union/Russia	Nikolay Tarasov	1985	1994		
France	Gilbert Guillaume	1987	2005	2000–2003	
Guyana	Mohamed Shahabuddeen	1988	1997		
India	Raghunandan Swarup Pathak	1989	1991		
Venezuela	Andrés Aguilar Mawdsley	1991	1995		
Sri Lanka	Christopher Weeramantry	1991	2000		1997–2000
Madagascar	Raymond Ranjeva	1991	2009		2003–2006
Nigeria	Bola Ajibola	1991	1994		
Hungary	Géza Herczegh	1993	2003		
China	Shi Jiuyong	1994	2010	2003–2006	2000–2003
Germany	Carl-August Fleischhauer	1994	2003		
Sierra Leone	Abdul G. Koroma	1994	2012		
Russia	Vladlen Vereshchetin	1994	2006		
Italy	Luigi Ferrari Bravo	1995	1997		
United Kingdom	Rosalyn Higgins	1995	2009	2006–2009	
Venezuela	Gonzalo Parra-Aranguren	1996	2009		
Netherlands	Pieter Kooijmans	1997	2006		
Brazil	Francisco Rezek	1997	2006		
Jordan	Awn Al-Khasawneh	2000	2011		2006–2009
United States	Thomas Buergenthal	2000	2010		
Egypt	Nabil El Araby	2001	2006		
Japan	Hisashi Owada	2003	2018	2009–2012	
Germany	Bruno Simma	2003	2012		
Slovakia	Peter Tomka	2003		2012–2015	2009–2012
France	Ronny Abraham	2005		2015–2018	
New Zealand	Sir Kenneth Keith	2006	2015		
Mexico	Bernardo Sepúlveda Amor	2006	2015		2012–2015
Morocco	Mohamed Bennouna	2006	2024		
Russia	Leonid Skotnikov	2006	2015		
Brazil	Antônio Augusto Cançado Trindade	2009	2022		
Somalia	Abdulqawi Ahmed Yusuf	2009	2025	2018–2021	2015–2018
United Kingdom	Sir Christopher Greenwood	2009	2018		
China	Xue Hanqin	2010			2018–2021
United States	Joan E. Donoghue	2010	2024	2021–2024	
Italy	Giorgio Gaja	2012	2021		
Uganda	Julia Sebutinde	2012			2024 –2027
India	Dalveer Bhandari	2012			
Australia	James Crawford	2015	2021		
Russia	Kirill Gevorgian	2015	2024		2021–2024
Jamaica	Patrick Lipton Robinson	2015	2024		
Lebanon	Nawaf Salam	2018	2025	2024–2025	
Japan	Yuji Iwasawa	2018		2025–2027	
Germany	Georg Nolte	2021			
Australia	Hilary Charlesworth	2021			
Brazil	Leonardo Nemer Caldeira Brant	2022			
United States	Sarah Cleveland	2024			
Mexico	Juan Manuel Gómez Robledo Verduzco	2024			
Romania	Bogdan Aurescu	2024			
South Africa	Dire Tladi	2024			
Jordan	Mahmoud Daifallah Hmoud	2025			
Kenya	Phoebe Okowa	2025			

=== Elections ===
1946 – 1948 – 1951 – 1954 – 1957 – 1960 – 1963 – 1966 – 1969 – 1972 – 1975 – 1978 – 1981 – 1984 – 1987 – 1990 – 1993 – 1996 – 1999 – 2002 – 2005 – 2008 – 2011 – 2014 – 2017 – 2018 – 2020 – 2021 – 2022 – 2023 – 2025

== Judges sitting ad hoc ==
Judges sitting ad hoc on the International Court of Justice, as of 16 December 2025
Judge	Nationality	Appointing State	Case(s)	Start	End
Georges Abi-Saab	Egypt	Republic of Mali	Frontier Dispute (Burkina Faso/Republic of Mali)	1983	1987
Georges Abi-Saab	Egypt	Chad	Territorial Dispute (Libyan Arab Jamahiriya/Chad)	1990	1994
Adetobunboh A. Ademola	Nigeria	Ethiopia	South West Africa (Ethiopia v. South Africa)	1960	1966
Adetobunboh A. Ademola	Nigeria	Liberia	South West Africa (Liberia v. South Africa)	1960	1966
Mohsen Aghahosseini	Islamic Republic of Iran	Islamic Republic of Iran	Aerial Incident of 3 July 1988 (Islamic Republic of Iran v. United States of America)	1989	1996
Roberto Ago	Italy	Honduras	Arbitral Award Made by the King of Spain on 23 December 1906 (Honduras v. Nicaragua)	1958	1960
Awn Shawkat Al-Khasawneh	Jordan	Nicaragua	Maritime Delimitation in the Caribbean Sea and the Pacific Ocean (Costa Rica v. Nicaragua)	2014	2018
Awn Shawkat Al-Khasawneh	Jordan	Nicaragua	Land Boundary in the Northern Part of Isla Portillos (Costa Rica v. Nicaragua)	2016	2018
Awn Shawkat Al-Khasawneh	Jordan	Nicaragua	Alleged Breaches of Certain International Obligations in respect of the Occupied Palestinian Territory (Nicaragua v. Germany)	2024	
Luis Alayza y Paz Soldán	Peru	Peru	Asylum (Colombia/Peru)	1949	1950
Luis Alayza y Paz Soldán	Peru	Peru	Request for Interpretation of the Judgment of 20 November 1950 in the Asylum Case (Colombia v. Peru)	1950	1950
Luis Alayza y Paz Soldán	Peru	Peru	Haya de la Torre (Colombia v. Peru)	1950	1951
Louise Arbour	Canada	Chile	Obligation to Negotiate Access to the Pacific Ocean (Bolivia v. Chile)	2013	2018
Enrique c. Armand-Ugon	Uruguay	Spain	Barcelona Traction, Light and Power Company, Limited (Belgium v. Spain) (New Application: 1962)	1962	1970
Antonio de Arruda Ferrer-Correia	Portugal	Portugal	East Timor (Portugal v. Australia)	1991	1995
Aharon Barak	Israel	Israel	Application of the Convention on the Prevention and Punishment of the Crime of Genocide in the Gaza Strip (South Africa v. Israel)	2023	
Rosemary Barkett	United States of America	United States of America	Certain Iranian Assets (Islamic Republic of Iran v. United States of America)	2016	
Sir Garfield Barwick	Australia	Australia	Nuclear Tests (Australia v. France)	1973	1974
Sir Garfield Barwick	Australia	New Zealand	Nuclear Tests (New Zealand v. France)	1973	1974
Suzanne Bastid	France	Tunisia	Application for Revision and Interpretation of the Judgment of 24 February 1982 in the Case concerning the Continental Shelf (Tunisia/Libyan Arab Jamahiriya) (Tunisia v. Libyan Arab Jamahiriya)	1984	1985
Philémon Beb à Don	Cameroon	Cameroon	Northern Cameroons (Cameroon v. United Kingdom)	1961	1963
Mohammed Bedjaoui	Algeria	Republic of Guinea	Ahmadou Sadio Diallo (Republic of Guinea v. Democratic Republic of the Congo)	1998	2012
Mohammed Bedjaoui	Algeria	Nicaragua	Territorial and Maritime Dispute (Nicaragua v. Colombia)	2001	2012
Mohammed Bedjaoui	Algeria	Niger	Frontier Dispute (Benin/Niger)	2002	2005
Mohammed Bedjaoui	Algeria	Marshall Islands	Obligations concerning Negotiations relating to Cessation of the Nuclear Arms Race and to Nuclear Disarmament (Marshall Islands v. India)	2014	2016
Mohammed Bedjaoui	Algeria	Marshall Islands	Obligations concerning Negotiations relating to Cessation of the Nuclear Arms Race and to Nuclear Disarmament (Marshall Islands v. Pakistan)	2014	2016
Mohammed Bedjaoui	Algeria	Marshall Islands	Obligations concerning Negotiations relating to Cessation of the Nuclear Arms Race and to Nuclear Disarmament (Marshall Islands v. United Kingdom)	2014	2016
Sir Franklin Berman	United Kingdom of Great Britain and Northern Ireland	Bahrain	Appeal relating to the Jurisdiction of the ICAO Council under Article 84 of the Convention on International Civil Aviation (Bahrain, Egypt, Saudi Arabia and United Arab Emirates v. Qatar)	2018	2020
Sir Franklin Berman	United Kingdom of Great Britain and Northern Ireland	Egypt	Appeal relating to the Jurisdiction of the ICAO Council under Article 84 of the Convention on International Civil Aviation (Bahrain, Egypt, Saudi Arabia and United Arab Emirates v. Qatar)	2018	2020
Sir Franklin Berman	United Kingdom of Great Britain and Northern Ireland	Saudi Arabia	Appeal relating to the Jurisdiction of the ICAO Council under Article 84 of the Convention on International Civil Aviation (Bahrain, Egypt, Saudi Arabia and United Arab Emirates v. Qatar)	2018	2020
Sir Franklin Berman	United Kingdom of Great Britain and Northern Ireland	United Arab Emirates	Appeal relating to the Jurisdiction of the ICAO Council under Article 84 of the Convention on International Civil Aviation (Bahrain, Egypt, Saudi Arabia and United Arab Emirates v. Qatar)	2018	2020
Sir Franklin Berman	United Kingdom of Great Britain and Northern Ireland	Bahrain	Appeal relating to the Jurisdiction of the ICAO Council under Article II, Section 2, of the 1944 International Air Services Transit Agreement (Bahrain, Egypt and United Arab Emirates v. Qatar)	2018	2020
Sir Franklin Berman	United Kingdom of Great Britain and Northern Ireland	Egypt	Appeal relating to the Jurisdiction of the ICAO Council under Article II, Section 2, of the 1944 International Air Services Transit Agreement (Bahrain, Egypt and United Arab Emirates v. Qatar)	2018	2020
Sir Franklin Berman	United Kingdom of Great Britain and Northern Ireland	United Arab Emirates	Appeal relating to the Jurisdiction of the ICAO Council under Article II, Section 2, of the 1944 International Air Services Transit Agreement (Bahrain, Egypt and United Arab Emirates v. Qatar)	2018	2020
Alphonse Boni	Cote d'Ivoire	Morocco	Western Sahara	1974	1975
Bengt Broms	Finland	Finland	Passage through the Great Belt (Finland v. Denmark)	1991	1992
Charles Brower	United States of America	Colombia	Question of the Delimitation of the Continental Shelf between Nicaragua and Colombia beyond 200 nautical miles from the Nicaraguan Coast (Nicaragua v. Colombia)	2013	
Charles Brower	United States of America	United States of America	Certain Iranian Assets (Islamic Republic of Iran v. United States of America)	2016	
Charles Brower	United States of America	United States of America	Alleged Violations of the 1955 Treaty of Amity, Economic Relations, and Consular Rights (Islamic Republic of Iran v. United States of America)	2018	
Ian Brownlie	United Kingdom of Great Britain and Northern Ireland	Liechtenstein	Certain Property (Liechtenstein v. Germany)	2001	2005
Andreas Bucher	Switzerland	Switzerland	Jurisdiction and Enforcement of Judgments in Civil and Commercial Matters (Belgium v. Switzerland)	2009	2011
Sayeman Bula-Bula	Democratic Republic of the Congo	Democratic Republic of the Congo	Arrest Warrant of 11 April 2000 (Democratic Republic of the Congo v. Belgium)	2000	2002
José Joaquin Caicedo Castilla	Colombia	Colombia	Asylum (Colombia/Peru)	1949	1950
José Joaquin Caicedo Castilla	Colombia	Colombia	Request for Interpretation of the Judgment of 20 November 1950 in the Asylum Case (Colombia v. Peru)	1950	1950
José Joaquin Caicedo Castilla	Colombia	Colombia	Haya de la Torre (Colombia v. Peru)	1950	1951
Ian Callinan	Australia	Australia	Questions relating to the Seizure and Detention of Certain Documents and Data (Timor-Leste v. Australia)	2013	2015
Antônio Augusto Cançado Trindade	Brazil	Costa Rica	Dispute regarding Navigational and Related Rights (Costa Rica v. Nicaragua)	2005	2009
Jean-Yves de Cara	France	Republic of the Congo	Certain Criminal Proceedings in France (Republic of the Congo v. France)	2002	2010
David Caron	United States of America	Colombia	Alleged Violations of Sovereign Rights and Maritime Spaces in the Caribbean Sea (Nicaragua v. Colombia)	2013	2022
David Caron	United States of America	United States of America	Certain Iranian Assets (Islamic Republic of Iran v. United States of America)	2016	
Paul Carry	Switzerland	Switzerland	Interhandel (Switzerland v. United States of America)	1957	1959
Jorge Castañeda	Mexico	Malta	Continental Shelf (Libyan Arab Jamahiriya/Malta)	1982	1985
Federico de Castro	Spain	Spain	Barcelona Traction, Light and Power Company, Limited (Belgium v. Spain)	1958	1961
Mohamed Ali Currim Chagla	India	India	Right of Passage over Indian Territory (Portugal v. India)	1955	1960
Hilary Charlesworth	Australia	Australia	Whaling in the Antarctic (Australia v. Japan: New Zealand intervening)	2010	2014
Hilary Charlesworth	Australia	Guyana	Arbitral Award of 3 October 1899 (Guyana v. Venezuela)	2018	
Joseph Chesson	Liberia	Ethiopia	South West Africa (Ethiopia v. South Africa)	1960	1966
Joseph Chesson	Liberia	Liberia	South West Africa (Liberia v. South Africa)	1960	1966
Maxwell Cohen	Canada	Canada	Delimitation of the Maritime Boundary in the Gulf of Maine Area (Canada/United States of America)	1981	1984
Claude-Albert Colliard	France	Nicaragua	Military and Paramilitary Activities in and against Nicaragua (Nicaragua v. United States of America)	1984	1991
Jean-Pierre Cot	France	Colombia	Territorial and Maritime Dispute (Nicaragua v. Colombia)	2001	2012
Jean-Pierre Cot	France	Romania	Maritime Delimitation in the Black Sea (Romania v. Ukraine)	2004	2009
Jean-Pierre Cot	France	Colombia	Aerial Herbicide Spraying (Ecuador v. Colombia)	2008	2013
Jean-Pierre Cot	France	Burkina Faso	Frontier Dispute (Burkina Faso/Niger)	2010	2013
Jean-Pierre Cot	France	Thailand	Request for Interpretation of the Judgment of 15 June 1962 in the Case concerning the Temple of Preah Vihear (Cambodia v. Thailand) (Cambodia v. Thailand)	2011	2013
Jean-Pierre Cot	France	Timor-Leste	Questions relating to the Seizure and Detention of Certain Documents and Data (Timor-Leste v. Australia)	2013	2015
Jean-Pierre Cot	France	United Arab Emirates	Application of the International Convention on the Elimination of All Forms of Racial Discrimination (Qatar v. United Arab Emirates)	2018	2021
Philippe Couvreur	Belgium	Venezuela	Arbitral Award of 3 October 1899 (Guyana v. Venezuela)	2018	
Philippe Couvreur	Belgium	Guatemala	Guatemala's Territorial, Insular and Maritime Claim (Guatemala/Belize)	2008	
Philippe Couvreur	Belgium	United Arab Emirates	Application of the Convention on the Prevention and Punishment of the Crime of Genocide in Sudan (Sudan v. United Arab Emirates)	2025	
John H. Currie	Canada	Canada	Alleged Violations of State Immunities (Islamic Republic of Iran v. Canada)	2023	
Yves Daudet	France	Democratic Republic of the Congo	Armed Activities on the Territory of the Congo (Democratic Republic of the Congo v. Uganda)	1999	2022
Yves Daudet	France	Burkina Faso	Frontier Dispute (Burkina Faso/Niger)	2010	2013
Yves Daudet	France	Bolivia	Obligation to Negotiate Access to the Pacific Ocean (Bolivia v. Chile)	2013	2018
Yves Daudet	France	Nicaragua	Alleged Violations of Sovereign Rights and Maritime Spaces in the Caribbean Sea (Nicaragua v. Colombia)	2013	2022
Yves Daudet	France	Bolivia	Dispute over the Status and Use of the Waters of the Silala (Chile v. Bolivia)	2016	
Yves Daudet	France	Qatar	Application of the International Convention on the Elimination of All Forms of Racial Discrimination (Qatar v. United Arab Emirates)	2018	2021
Yves Daudet	France	Qatar	Appeal relating to the Jurisdiction of the ICAO Council under Article 84 of the Convention on International Civil Aviation (Bahrain, Egypt, Saudi Arabia and United Arab Emirates v. Qatar)	2018	2020
Yves Daudet	France	Qatar	Appeal relating to the Jurisdiction of the ICAO Council under Article II, Section 2, of the 1944 International Air Services Transit Agreement (Bahrain, Egypt and United Arab Emirates v. Qatar)	2018	2020
Yves Daudet	France	Armenia	Application of the International Convention on the Elimination of All Forms of Racial Discrimination (Armenia v. Azerbaijan)	2021	
Yves Daudet	France	Armenia	Application of the International Convention on the Elimination of All Forms of Racial Discrimination (Azerbaijan v. Armenia)	2021	
Yves Daudet	France	Ukraine	Allegations of Genocide under the Convention on the Prevention and Punishment of the Crime of Genocide (Ukraine v. Russian Federation)	2022	
Igor Daxner	Czechoslovakia	Albania	Corfu Channel (United Kingdom of Great Britain and Northern Ireland v. Albania)	1947	1949
Vojin Dimitrijevic	Yugoslavia	Yugoslavia	Application for Revision of the Judgment of 11 July 1996 in the Case concerning Application of the Convention on the Prevention and Punishment of the Crime of Genocide (Bosnia and Herzegovina v. Yugoslavia), Preliminary Objections (Yugoslavia v. Bosnia and Herzegovina)	2001	2003
Christopher J. R. Dugard	South Africa	Rwanda	Armed Activities on the Territory of the Congo (Democratic Republic of the Congo v. Rwanda)	1999	2001
Christopher J. R. Dugard	South Africa	Rwanda	Armed Activities on the Territory of the Congo (New Application: 2002) (Democratic Republic of the Congo v. Rwanda)	2002	2006
Christopher J. R. Dugard	South Africa	Malaysia	Sovereignty over Pedra Branca/Pulau Batu Puteh, Middle Rocks and South Ledge (Malaysia/Singapore)	2003	2008
Christopher J. R. Dugard	South Africa	Costa Rica	Certain Activities Carried Out by Nicaragua in the Border Area (Costa Rica v. Nicaragua)	2010	2018
Christopher J. R. Dugard	South Africa	Costa Rica	Construction of a Road in Costa Rica along the San Juan River (Nicaragua v. Costa Rica)	2011	2015
Christopher J. R. Dugard	South Africa	Malaysia	Application for revision of the Judgment of 23 May 2008 in the case concerning Sovereignty over Pedra Branca/Pulau Batu Puteh, Middle Rocks and South Ledge (Malaysia/Singapore) (Malaysia v. Singapore)	2017	2018
Christopher J. R. Dugard	South Africa	Malaysia	Request for Interpretation of the Judgment of 23 May 2008 in the case concerning Sovereignty over Pedra Branca/Pulau Batu Puteh, Middle Rocks and South Ledge (Malaysia/Singapore) (Malaysia v. Singapore)	2017	2018
Patrick Ferdinand Duinslaeger	Belgium	Belgium	Legality of Use of Force (Serbia and Montenegro v. Belgium)	1999	2004
Nasrollah Ebrahimi	Islamic Republic of Iran	Islamic Republic of Iran	Appeal relating to the Jurisdiction of the ICAO Council under Article 84 of the Convention on International Civil Aviation (Islamic Republic of Iran v. Canada, Sweden, Ukraine and United Kingdom)	2025	
Ahmed Sadek El-Kosheri	Egypt	Libyan Arab Jamahiriya	Questions of Interpretation and Application of the 1971 Montreal Convention arising from the Aerial Incident at Lockerbie (Libyan Arab Jamahiriya v. United Kingdom)	1992	2003
Ahmed Sadek El-Kosheri	Egypt	Libyan Arab Jamahiriya	Questions of Interpretation and Application of the 1971 Montreal Convention arising from the Aerial Incident at Lockerbie (Libyan Arab Jamahiriya v. United States of America)	1992	2003
Nabil Elaraby	Egypt	United Arab Emirates	Appeal relating to the Jurisdiction of the ICAO Council under Article 84 of the Convention on International Civil Aviation (Bahrain, Egypt, Saudi Arabia and United Arab Emirates v. Qatar)	2018	2020
Nabil Elaraby	Egypt	United Arab Emirates	Appeal relating to the Jurisdiction of the ICAO Council under Article II, Section 2, of the 1944 International Air Services Transit Agreement (Bahrain, Egypt and United Arab Emirates v. Qatar)	2018	2020
Jens Evensen	Norway	Tunisia	Continental Shelf (Tunisia/Libyan Arab Jamahiriya)	1978	1982
Bohuslav Ečer	Czechoslovakia	Albania	Corfu Channel (United Kingdom of Great Britain and Northern Ireland v. Albania)	1947	1949
Manuel Fernandes	Portugal	Portugal	Right of Passage over Indian Territory (Portugal v. India)	1955	1960
Silvia Alejandra Fernández de Gurmendi	Argentina	Canada	Application of the Convention against Torture and Other Cruel, Inhuman or Degrading Treatment or Punishment (Canada and Netherlands v. Syrian Arab Republic)	2023	
Silvia Alejandra Fernández de Gurmendi	Argentina	Netherlands	Application of the Convention against Torture and Other Cruel, Inhuman or Degrading Treatment or Punishment (Canada and Netherlands v. Syrian Arab Republic)	2023	
PaulHenning Fischer	Denmark	Denmark	Maritime Delimitation in the Area between Greenland and Jan Mayen (Denmark v. Norway)	1988	1993
PaulHenning Fischer	Denmark	Denmark	Passage through the Great Belt (Finland v. Denmark)	1991	1992
Carl-August Fleischhauer	Federal Republic of Germany	Germany	Certain Property (Liechtenstein v. Germany)	2001	2005
Yves L. Fortier	Canada	Bahrain	Maritime Delimitation and Territorial Questions between Qatar and Bahrain (Qatar v. Bahrain)	1991	2001
Yves L. Fortier	Canada	Colombia	Territorial and Maritime Dispute (Nicaragua v. Colombia)	2001	2012
Thomas Franck	United States of America	Indonesia	Sovereignty over Pulau Ligitan and Pulau Sipadan (Indonesia/Malaysia)	1998	2002
Giorgio Gaja	Italy	Italy	Legality of Use of Force (Serbia and Montenegro v. Italy)	1999	2004
Giorgio Gaja	Italy	Nicaragua	Territorial and Maritime Dispute between Nicaragua and Honduras in the Caribbean Sea (Nicaragua v. Honduras)	1999	2007
Giorgio Gaja	Italy	Nicaragua	Territorial and Maritime Dispute (Nicaragua v. Colombia)	2001	2012
Giorgio Gaja	Italy	Georgia	Application of the International Convention on the Elimination of All Forms of Racial Discrimination (Georgia v. Russian Federation)	2008	2011
Giorgio Gaja	Italy	Italy	Jurisdictional Immunities of the State (Germany v. Italy: Greece intervening)	2008	2012
Giorgio Gaja	Italy	Italy	Questions of jurisdictional immunities of the State and measures of constraint against State-owned property (Germany v. Italy)	2022	
W. J. Ganshof v.d. Meersch	Belgium	Belgium	Barcelona Traction, Light and Power Company, Limited (Belgium v. Spain)	1958	1961
W. J. Ganshof v.d. Meersch	Belgium	Belgium	Barcelona Traction, Light and Power Company, Limited (Belgium v. Spain) (New Application: 1962)	1962	1970
Carlos Garcia Bauer	Guatemala	Guatemala	Nottebohm (Liechtenstein v. Guatemala)	1951	1955
Kirill Gevorgian	Russian Federation	Syrian Arab Republic	Application of the Convention against Torture and Other Cruel, Inhuman or Degrading Treatment or Punishment (Canada and Netherlands v. Syrian Arab Republic)	2023	
Kirill Gevorgian	Russian Federation	Belarus	Alleged Smuggling of Migrants (Lithuania v. Belarus)	2025	
David Goitein	Israel	Israel	Aerial Incident of 27 July 1955 (Israel v. Bulgaria)	1957	1959
Julio Diego Gonzáles Campos	Spain	Honduras	Territorial and Maritime Dispute between Nicaragua and Honduras in the Caribbean Sea (Nicaragua v. Honduras)	1999	2007
Paul Guggenheim	Switzerland	Liechtenstein	Nottebohm (Liechtenstein v. Guatemala)	1951	1955
Gilbert Guillaume	France	France	Certain Criminal Proceedings in France (Republic of the Congo v. France)	2002	2010
Gilbert Guillaume	France	Nicaragua	Dispute regarding Navigational and Related Rights (Costa Rica v. Nicaragua)	2005	2009
Gilbert Guillaume	France	France	Certain Questions of Mutual Assistance in Criminal Matters (Djibouti v. France)	2006	2008
Gilbert Guillaume	France	Peru	Maritime Dispute (Peru v. Chile)	2008	2014
Gilbert Guillaume	France	Nicaragua	Certain Activities Carried Out by Nicaragua in the Border Area (Costa Rica v. Nicaragua)	2010	2018
Gilbert Guillaume	France	Cambodia	Request for Interpretation of the Judgment of 15 June 1962 in the Case concerning the Temple of Preah Vihear (Cambodia v. Thailand) (Cambodia v. Thailand)	2011	2013
Gilbert Guillaume	France	Nicaragua	Construction of a Road in Costa Rica along the San Juan River (Nicaragua v. Costa Rica)	2011	2015
Gilbert Guillaume	France	Kenya	Maritime Delimitation in the Indian Ocean (Somalia v. Kenya)	2014	2021
Gilbert Guillaume	France	Singapore	Application for revision of the Judgment of 23 May 2008 in the case concerning Sovereignty over Pedra Branca/Pulau Batu Puteh, Middle Rocks and South Ledge (Malaysia/Singapore) (Malaysia v. Singapore)	2017	2018
Gilbert Guillaume	France	Singapore	Request for Interpretation of the Judgment of 23 May 2008 in the case concerning Sovereignty over Pedra Branca/Pulau Batu Puteh, Middle Rocks and South Ledge (Malaysia/Singapore) (Malaysia v. Singapore)	2017	2018
Gilbert Guillaume	France	Palestine	Relocation of the United States Embassy to Jerusalem (Palestine v. United States of America)	2018	
Sead Hodžić	Bosnia and Herzegovina	Bosnia and Herzegovina	Application for Revision of the Judgment of 11 July 1996 in the Case concerning Application of the Convention on the Prevention and Punishment of the Crime of Genocide (Bosnia and Herzegovina v. Yugoslavia), Preliminary Objections (Yugoslavia v. Bosnia and Herzegovina)	2001	2003
Sir Robert Yewdall Jennings	United Kingdom of Great Britain and Northern Ireland	United Kingdom of Great Britain and Northern Ireland	Questions of Interpretation and Application of the 1971 Montreal Convention arising from the Aerial Incident at Lockerbie (Libyan Arab Jamahiriya v. United Kingdom)	1992	2003
Tassaduq Hussain Jillani	Pakistan	Pakistan	Jadhav (India v. Pakistan)	2017	2019
Eduardo Jiménez de Aréchaga	Uruguay	Libyan Arab Jamahiriya	Continental Shelf (Tunisia/Libyan Arab Jamahiriya)	1978	1982
Eduardo Jiménez de Aréchaga	Uruguay	Libyan Arab Jamahiriya	Continental Shelf (Libyan Arab Jamahiriya/Malta)	1982	1985
Eduardo Jiménez de Aréchaga	Uruguay	Libyan Arab Jamahiriya	Application for Revision and Interpretation of the Judgment of 24 February 1982 in the Case concerning the Continental Shelf (Tunisia/Libyan Arab Jamahiriya) (Tunisia v. Libyan Arab Jamahiriya)	1984	1985
James L. Kateka	United Republic of Tanzania	Uganda	Armed Activities on the Territory of the Congo (Democratic Republic of the Congo v. Uganda)	1999	2022
James L. Kateka	United Republic of Tanzania	Equatorial Guinea	Immunities and Criminal Proceedings (Equatorial Guinea v. France)	2016	2020
Sir Kenneth Keith	New Zealand	Azerbaijan	Application of the International Convention on the Elimination of All Forms of Racial Discrimination (Armenia v. Azerbaijan)	2021	
Sir Kenneth Keith	New Zealand	Azerbaijan	Application of the International Convention on the Elimination of All Forms of Racial Discrimination (Azerbaijan v. Armenia)	2021	
Philippe Kirsch	Belgium	Belgium	Questions relating to the Obligation to Prosecute or Extradite (Belgium v. Senegal)	2009	2012
Abdul G. Koroma	Sierra Leone	Azerbaijan	Application of the International Convention on the Elimination of All Forms of Racial Discrimination (Armenia v. Azerbaijan)	2021	
Abdul G. Koroma	Sierra Leone	Azerbaijan	Application of the International Convention on the Elimination of All Forms of Racial Discrimination (Azerbaijan v. Armenia)	2021	
Claus Kreß	Germany	Myanmar	Application of the Convention on the Prevention and Punishment of the Crime of Genocide (The Gambia v. Myanmar: 11 States intervening)	2019	
Milenko Kreća	Serbia and Montenegro	Serbia and Montenegro	Application of the Convention on the Prevention and Punishment of the Crime of Genocide (Bosnia and Herzegovina v. Serbia and Montenegro)	1993	2007
Milenko Kreća	Serbia and Montenegro	Yugoslavia	Application of the Convention on the Prevention and Punishment of the Crime of Genocide (Bosnia and Herzegovina v. Serbia and Montenegro)	1993	2007
Milenko Kreća	Serbia and Montenegro	Serbia and Montenegro	Legality of Use of Force (Serbia and Montenegro v. Belgium)	1999	2004
Milenko Kreća	Serbia and Montenegro	Serbia and Montenegro	Legality of Use of Force (Serbia and Montenegro v. Canada)	1999	2004
Milenko Kreća	Serbia and Montenegro	Serbia and Montenegro	Legality of Use of Force (Serbia and Montenegro v. France)	1999	2004
Milenko Kreća	Serbia and Montenegro	Serbia and Montenegro	Legality of Use of Force (Serbia and Montenegro v. Germany)	1999	2004
Milenko Kreća	Serbia and Montenegro	Serbia and Montenegro	Legality of Use of Force (Serbia and Montenegro v. Italy)	1999	2004
Milenko Kreća	Serbia and Montenegro	Serbia and Montenegro	Legality of Use of Force (Serbia and Montenegro v. Netherlands)	1999	2004
Milenko Kreća	Serbia and Montenegro	Serbia and Montenegro	Legality of Use of Force (Serbia and Montenegro v. Portugal)	1999	2004
Milenko Kreća	Serbia and Montenegro	Yugoslavia	Legality of Use of Force (Yugoslavia v. Spain)	1999	1999
Milenko Kreća	Serbia and Montenegro	Serbia and Montenegro	Legality of Use of Force (Serbia and Montenegro v. United Kingdom)	1999	2004
Milenko Kreća	Serbia and Montenegro	Yugoslavia	Legality of Use of Force (Yugoslavia v. United States of America)	1999	1999
Milenko Kreća	Serbia and Montenegro	Serbia	Application of the Convention on the Prevention and Punishment of the Crime of Genocide (Croatia v. Serbia)	1999	2015
Marc Lalonde	Canada	Canada	Fisheries Jurisdiction (Spain v. Canada)	1995	1998
Marc Lalonde	Canada	Canada	Legality of Use of Force (Serbia and Montenegro v. Canada)	1999	2004
Sir Elihu Lauterpacht	United Kingdom of Great Britain and Northern Ireland	Bosnia and Herzegovina	Application of the Convention on the Prevention and Punishment of the Crime of Genocide (Bosnia and Herzegovina v. Serbia and Montenegro)	1993	2007
François Luchaire	France	Burkina Faso	Frontier Dispute (Burkina Faso/Republic of Mali)	1983	1987
Ahmed Mahiou	Algeria	Bosnia and Herzegovina	Application of the Convention on the Prevention and Punishment of the Crime of Genocide (Bosnia and Herzegovina v. Serbia and Montenegro)	1993	2007
Ahmed Mahiou	Algeria	Republic of Guinea	Ahmadou Sadio Diallo (Republic of Guinea v. Democratic Republic of the Congo)	1998	2012
Ahmed Mahiou	Algeria	Bosnia and Herzegovina	Application for Revision of the Judgment of 11 July 1996 in the Case concerning Application of the Convention on the Prevention and Punishment of the Crime of Genocide (Bosnia and Herzegovina v. Yugoslavia), Preliminary Objections (Yugoslavia v. Bosnia and Herzegovina)	2001	2003
Ahmed Mahiou	Algeria	Niger	Frontier Dispute (Burkina Faso/Niger)	2010	2013
Loretta Malintoppi	Italy	Italy	Questions of jurisdictional immunities of the State and measures of constraint against State-owned property (Germany v. Italy)	2022	
Auguste Mampuya Kanunk’a Tshiabo	Democratic Republic of the Congo	Democratic Republic of the Congo	Ahmadou Sadio Diallo (Republic of Guinea v. Democratic Republic of the Congo)	1998	2012
Jean-Pierre Mavungu Mvubidi-Ngoma	Democratic Republic of the Congo	Democratic Republic of the Congo	Armed Activities on the Territory of the Congo (Democratic Republic of the Congo v. Rwanda)	1999	2001
Jean-Pierre Mavungu Mvubidi-Ngoma	Democratic Republic of the Congo	Democratic Republic of the Congo	Armed Activities on the Territory of the Congo (New Application: 2002) (Democratic Republic of the Congo v. Rwanda)	2002	2006
Sir Louis Mbanefo	Nigeria	Ethiopia	South West Africa (Ethiopia v. South Africa)	1960	1966
Sir Louis Mbanefo	Nigeria	Liberia	South West Africa (Liberia v. South Africa)	1960	1966
Kéba Mbaye	Senegal	Senegal	Arbitral Award of 31 July 1989 (Guinea-Bissau v. Senegal)	1989	1991
Kéba Mbaye	Senegal	Cameroon	Land and Maritime Boundary between Cameroon and Nigeria (Cameroon v. Nigeria: Equatorial Guinea intervening)	1994	2002
Kéba Mbaye	Senegal	Cameroon	Request for Interpretation of the Judgment of 11 June 1998 in the Case concerning the Land and Maritime Boundary between Cameroon and Nigeria (Cameroon v. Nigeria), Preliminary Objections (Nigeria v. Cameroon)	1998	1999
Donald M. McRae	Canada	Chile	Obligation to Negotiate Access to the Pacific Ocean (Bolivia v. Chile)	2013	2018
Donald M. McRae	Canada	Colombia	Question of the Delimitation of the Continental Shelf between Nicaragua and Colombia beyond 200 nautical miles from the Nicaraguan Coast (Nicaragua v. Colombia)	2013	
Donald M. McRae	Canada	Colombia	Alleged Violations of Sovereign Rights and Maritime Spaces in the Caribbean Sea (Nicaragua v. Colombia)	2013	2022
Donald M. McRae	Canada	Belize	Guatemala's Territorial, Insular and Maritime Claim (Guatemala/Belize)	2008	
Donald M. McRae	Canada	Canada	Aerial Incident of 8 January 2020 (Canada, Sweden, Ukraine and United Kingdom v. Islamic Republic of Iran)	2023	
Donald M. McRae	Canada	Sweden	Aerial Incident of 8 January 2020 (Canada, Sweden, Ukraine and United Kingdom v. Islamic Republic of Iran)	2023	
Donald M. McRae	Canada	Ukraine	Aerial Incident of 8 January 2020 (Canada, Sweden, Ukraine and United Kingdom v. Islamic Republic of Iran)	2023	
Donald M. McRae	Canada	United Kingdom of Great Britain and Northern Ireland	Aerial Incident of 8 January 2020 (Canada, Sweden, Ukraine and United Kingdom v. Islamic Republic of Iran)	2023	
Donald M. McRae	Canada	Ecuador	Embassy of Mexico in Quito (Mexico v. Ecuador)	2024	
Donald M. McRae	Canada	Ecuador	Glas Espinel (Ecuador v. Mexico)	2024	
Thomas A. Mensah	Ghana	Nicaragua	Territorial and Maritime Dispute (Nicaragua v. Colombia)	2001	2012
Nicolas Michel	Switzerland	Lithuania	Alleged Smuggling of Migrants (Lithuania v. Belarus)	2025	
Djamchid Momtaz	Islamic Republic of Iran	Islamic Republic of Iran	Certain Iranian Assets (Islamic Republic of Iran v. United States of America)	2016	
Djamchid Momtaz	Islamic Republic of Iran	Islamic Republic of Iran	Alleged Violations of the 1955 Treaty of Amity, Economic Relations, and Consular Rights (Islamic Republic of Iran v. United States of America)	2018	
Gaetano Morelli	Italy	Italy	Monetary Gold Removed from Rome in 1943 (Italy v. France, United Kingdom of Great Britain and Northern Ireland and United States of America)	1953	1954
Dikgang Ernest Moseneke	South Africa	South Africa	Application of the Convention on the Prevention and Punishment of the Crime of Genocide in the Gaza Strip (South Africa v. Israel)	2023	
Hermann Mosler	Federal Republic of Germany	Germany	North Sea Continental Shelf (Federal Republic of Germany/Denmark)	1967	1969
Hermann Mosler	Federal Republic of Germany	Germany	North Sea Continental Shelf (Federal Republic of Germany/Netherlands)	1967	1969
Singh Nagendra	India	India	Appeal Relating to the Jurisdiction of the ICAO Council (India v. Pakistan)	1971	1972
Johannes Offerhaus	Netherlands	Netherlands	Application of the Convention of 1902 Governing the Guardianship of Infants (Netherlands v. Sweden)	1957	1958
Taoheed Olufemi Elias	Nigeria	Equatorial Guinea	Request relating to the Return of Property Confiscated in Criminal Proceedings (Equatorial Guinea v. France)	2022	
Francisco Orrego Vicuña	Chile	Chile	Maritime Dispute (Peru v. Chile)	2008	2014
Bernard H. Oxman	United States of America	Ukraine	Maritime Delimitation in the Black Sea (Romania v. Ukraine)	2004	2009
Sir Geoffrey Palmer	New Zealand	New Zealand	Request for an Examination of the Situation in Accordance with Paragraph 63 of the Courts Judgment of 20 December 1974 in the Nuclear Tests (New Zealand v. France) Case	1995	1995
Felipe H. Paolillo	Uruguay	El Salvador	Application for Revision of the Judgment of 11 September 1992 in the Case concerning the Land, Island and Maritime Frontier Dispute (El Salvador/Honduras: Nicaragua intervening) (El Salvador v. Honduras)	1993	2003
Navanethem Pillay	South Africa	Gambia	Application of the Convention on the Prevention and Punishment of the Crime of Genocide (The Gambia v. Myanmar: 11 States intervening)	2019	
Mónica Pinto	Argentina	Gabon	Land and Maritime Delimitation and Sovereignty over Islands (Gabon/Equatorial Guinea)	2016	
Syed Sharif Uddin Pirzada	Pakistan	Pakistan	Aerial Incident of 10 August 1999 (Pakistan v. India)	1999	2000
Fausto Pocar	Italy	Belgium	Jurisdiction and Enforcement of Judgments in Civil and Commercial Matters (Belgium v. Switzerland)	2009	2011
Fausto Pocar	Italy	Ukraine	Application of the International Convention for the Suppression of the Financing of Terrorism and of the International Convention on the Elimination of All Forms of Racial Discrimination (Ukraine v. Russian Federation)	2017	
Pemmaraju Sreenivasa Rao	India	Singapore	Sovereignty over Pedra Branca/Pulau Batu Puteh, Middle Rocks and South Ledge (Malaysia/Singapore)	2003	2008
B.P. Jeevan Reddy	India	India	Aerial Incident of 10 August 1999 (Pakistan v. India)	1999	2000
François Rigaux	Belgium	Islamic Republic of Iran	Oil Platforms (Islamic Republic of Iran v. United States of America)	1989	2003
Willem Riphagen	Netherlands	Belgium	Barcelona Traction, Light and Power Company, Limited (Belgium v. Spain) (New Application: 1962)	1962	1970
Emmanuel Roucounas	Greece	Greece	Application of the Interim Accord of 13 September 1995 (the former Yugoslav Republic of Macedonia v. Greece)	2008	2011
José María Ruda	Argentina	Qatar	Maritime Delimitation and Territorial Questions between Qatar and Bahrain (Qatar v. Bahrain)	1991	2001
Jean Salmon	Belgium	Burundi	Armed Activities on the Territory of the Congo (Democratic Republic of the Congo v. Burundi)	1999	2001
Karim Sandjabi	Islamic Republic of Iran	Islamic Republic of Iran	Anglo-Iranian Oil Co. (United Kingdom v. Iran)	1951	1952
Jamal Seifi	Islamic Republic of Iran	Islamic Republic of Iran	Alleged Violations of State Immunities (Islamic Republic of Iran v. Canada)	2023	
Jamal Seifi	Islamic Republic of Iran	Islamic Republic of Iran	Aerial Incident of 8 January 2020 (Canada, Sweden, Ukraine and United Kingdom v. Islamic Republic of Iran)	2023	
Bernardo Sepúlveda-Amor	Mexico	Mexico	Avena and Other Mexican Nationals (Mexico v. United States of America)	2003	2004
José Sette-Camara	Brazil	Libyan Arab Jamahiriya	Territorial Dispute (Libyan Arab Jamahiriya/Chad)	1990	1994
Mohamed Shahabuddeen	Guyana	Bahrain	Maritime Delimitation and Territorial Questions between Qatar and Bahrain (Qatar v. Bahrain)	1991	2001
Mohamed Shahabuddeen	Guyana	Indonesia	Sovereignty over Pulau Ligitan and Pulau Sipadan (Indonesia/Malaysia)	1998	2002
Ron A. Shapira	Israel	Israel	Application of the Convention on the Prevention and Punishment of the Crime of Genocide in the Gaza Strip (South Africa v. Israel)	2023	
Bruno Simma	Germany	Costa Rica	Maritime Delimitation in the Caribbean Sea and the Pacific Ocean (Costa Rica v. Nicaragua)	2014	2018
Bruno Simma	Germany	Chile	Dispute over the Status and Use of the Waters of the Silala (Chile v. Bolivia)	2016	
Bruno Simma	Germany	Costa Rica	Land Boundary in the Northern Part of Isla Portillos (Costa Rica v. Nicaragua)	2016	2018
Bruno Simma	Germany	Sudan	Application of the Convention on the Prevention and Punishment of the Crime of Genocide in Sudan (Sudan v. United Arab Emirates)	2025	
Leonid Skotnikov	Russian Federation	Nicaragua	Question of the Delimitation of the Continental Shelf between Nicaragua and Colombia beyond 200 nautical miles from the Nicaraguan Coast (Nicaragua v. Colombia)	2013	
Leonid Skotnikov	Russian Federation	Russian Federation	Application of the International Convention for the Suppression of the Financing of Terrorism and of the International Convention on the Elimination of All Forms of Racial Discrimination (Ukraine v. Russian Federation)	2017	
Krzysztof Skubiszewski	Poland	Portugal	East Timor (Portugal v. Australia)	1991	1995
Krzysztof Skubiszewski	Poland	Slovakia	Gabčíkovo-Nagymaros Project (Hungary/Slovakia)	1992	1997
Max Sorensen	Denmark	Denmark	North Sea Continental Shelf (Federal Republic of Germany/Denmark)	1967	1969
Max Sorensen	Denmark	Netherlands	North Sea Continental Shelf (Federal Republic of Germany/Netherlands)	1967	1969
Jean Spiropoulos	Greece	Greece	Ambatielos (Greece v. United Kingdom)	1951	1953
Michel Stassinopoulos	Greece	Greece	Aegean Sea Continental Shelf (Greece v. Turkey)	1976	1978
Sir Ninian Stephen	Australia	Australia	East Timor (Portugal v. Australia)	1991	1995
Fredrik Julius Christian Sterzel	Sweden	Sweden	Application of the Convention of 1902 Governing the Guardianship of Infants (Netherlands v. Sweden)	1957	1958
Serge Sur	France	Senegal	Questions relating to the Obligation to Prosecute or Extradite (Belgium v. Senegal)	2009	2012
Hubert Thierry	France	Guinea-Bissau	Arbitral Award of 31 July 1989 (Guinea-Bissau v. Senegal)	1989	1991
Santiago Torres Bernárdez	Spain	Honduras	Land, Island and Maritime Frontier Dispute (El Salvador/Honduras: Nicaragua intervening)	1986	1992
Santiago Torres Bernárdez	Spain	Nicaragua	Land, Island and Maritime Frontier Dispute (El Salvador/Honduras: Nicaragua intervening)	1986	1992
Santiago Torres Bernárdez	Spain	Qatar	Maritime Delimitation and Territorial Questions between Qatar and Bahrain (Qatar v. Bahrain)	1991	2001
Santiago Torres Bernárdez	Spain	Spain	Fisheries Jurisdiction (Spain v. Canada)	1995	1998
Santiago Torres Bernárdez	Spain	Spain	Legality of Use of Force (Yugoslavia v. Spain)	1999	1999
Santiago Torres Bernárdez	Spain	Honduras	Territorial and Maritime Dispute between Nicaragua and Honduras in the Caribbean Sea (Nicaragua v. Honduras)	1999	2007
Santiago Torres Bernárdez	Spain	Honduras	Application for Revision of the Judgment of 11 September 1992 in the Case concerning the Land, Island and Maritime Frontier Dispute (El Salvador/Honduras: Nicaragua intervening) (El Salvador v. Honduras)	1993	2003
Santiago Torres Bernárdez	Spain	Nicaragua	Application for Revision of the Judgment of 11 September 1992 in the Case concerning the Land, Island and Maritime Frontier Dispute (El Salvador/Honduras: Nicaragua intervening) (El Salvador v. Honduras)	1993	2003
Santiago Torres Bernárdez	Spain	Uruguay	Pulp Mills on the River Uruguay (Argentina v. Uruguay)	2006	2010
Bakhtiyar Tuzmukhamedov	Russian Federation	Russian Federation	Application of the International Convention for the Suppression of the Financing of Terrorism and of the International Convention on the Elimination of All Forms of Racial Discrimination (Ukraine v. Russian Federation)	2017	
Bakhtiyar Tuzmukhamedov	Russian Federation	Russian Federation	Allegations of Genocide under the Convention on the Prevention and Punishment of the Crime of Genocide (Ukraine v. Russian Federation)	2022	
Francisco Urrutia Holguin	Colombia	Nicaragua	Arbitral Award Made by the King of Spain on 23 December 1906 (Honduras v. Nicaragua)	1958	1960
Nicolas Valticos	Greece	Malta	Continental Shelf (Libyan Arab Jamahiriya/Malta)	1982	1985
Nicolas Valticos	Greece	El Salvador	Land, Island and Maritime Frontier Dispute (El Salvador/Honduras: Nicaragua intervening)	1986	1992
Nicolas Valticos	Greece	Bahrain	Maritime Delimitation and Territorial Questions between Qatar and Bahrain (Qatar v. Bahrain)	1991	2001
Joe Verhoeven	Belgium	Democratic Republic of the Congo	Armed Activities on the Territory of the Congo (Democratic Republic of the Congo v. Burundi)	1999	2001
Joe Verhoeven	Belgium	Democratic Republic of the Congo	Armed Activities on the Territory of the Congo (Democratic Republic of the Congo v. Uganda)	1999	2022
Joe Verhoeven	Belgium	Democratic Republic of the Congo	Armed Activities on the Territory of the Congo (Democratic Republic of the Congo v. Rwanda)	1999	2001
Raúl Emilio Vinuesa	Argentina	Argentina	Pulp Mills on the River Uruguay (Argentina v. Uruguay)	2006	2010
Raúl Emilio Vinuesa	Argentina	Ecuador	Aerial Herbicide Spraying (Ecuador v. Colombia)	2008	2013
Michel Virally	France	Nicaragua	Application for Revision of the Judgment of 11 September 1992 in the Case concerning the Land, Island and Maritime Frontier Dispute (El Salvador/Honduras: Nicaragua intervening) (El Salvador v. Honduras)	1993	2003
Budislav Vukas	Croatia	Croatia	Application of the Convention on the Prevention and Punishment of the Crime of Genocide (Croatia v. Serbia)	1999	2015
Budislav Vukas	Croatia	North Macedonia	Application of the Interim Accord of 13 September 1995 (the former Yugoslav Republic of Macedonia v. Greece)	2008	2011
Christopher Gregory Weeramantry	Sri Lanka	Malaysia	Sovereignty over Pulau Ligitan and Pulau Sipadan (Indonesia/Malaysia)	1998	2002
Rüdiger Wolfrum	Germany	Guyana	Arbitral Award of 3 October 1899 (Guyana v. Venezuela)	2018	
Rüdiger Wolfrum	Germany	Equatorial Guinea	Land and Maritime Delimitation and Sovereignty over Islands (Gabon/Equatorial Guinea)	2016	
J.T. van Wyk	South Africa	South Africa	South West Africa (Ethiopia v. South Africa)	1960	1966
J.T. van Wyk	South Africa	South Africa	South West Africa (Liberia v. South Africa)	1960	1966
Christine van den Wyngaert	Belgium	Belgium	Arrest Warrant of 11 April 2000 (Democratic Republic of the Congo v. Belgium)	2000	2002
Mohamed Yaqub Ali Khan	Pakistan	Ethiopia	South West Africa (Ethiopia v. South Africa)	1960	1966
Mohamed Yaqub Ali Khan	Pakistan	Liberia	South West Africa (Liberia v. South Africa)	1960	1966
Mohamed Yaqub Ali Khan	Pakistan	Pakistan	Trial of Pakistani Prisoners of War (Pakistan v. India)	1973	1973
Sir Muhammad Zafrulla Khan	Pakistan	Ethiopia	South West Africa (Ethiopia v. South Africa)	1960	1966
Sir Muhammad Zafrulla Khan	Pakistan	Liberia	South West Africa (Liberia v. South Africa)	1960	1966
Sir Muhammad Zafrulla Khan	Pakistan	Pakistan	Trial of Pakistani Prisoners of War (Pakistan v. India)	1973	1973
Jaroslav Žourek	Czechoslovakia	Bulgaria	Aerial Incident of 27 July 1955 (Israel v. Bulgaria)	1957	1959
Jaroslav Žourek	Czechoslovakia	Bulgaria	Aerial Incident of 27 July 1955 (United States of America v. Bulgaria)	1957	1960

== See also ==
- List of International Court of Justice cases
- Category:International Court of Justice judges
