= Federico de Castro =

Federico de Castro y Bravo (21 October 1903 in Seville – 1983 in Madrid) was a Spanish jurist, specialized in private law. He served as a judge on the International Court of Justice from 1970 until 1979. He also served as a judge on the European Nuclear Energy Tribunal.

== Bibliography ==
- Faura, Luis Figa. "El profesor Federico de Castro y el Derecho mercantil." Anuario de derecho civil 36.4 (1983): 1321-1326.
- Castro y Bravo, Federico de; Díez-Picazo, Luis María (1984). Derecho civil de España (Faks.-Neudr ed.). Madrid: Ed. Civitas. ISBN 978-84-7398-283-2.
- Castro y Bravo, Federico de (1985). El negocio jurídico. Madrid: Civitas. ISBN 978-84-7398-322-8.

Legal offices
Preceded by Gaetano Morelli	Judge of International Court of Justice; 1970–1979	Succeeded by Roberto Ago
