= 2018 United Nations Security Council election =

Election to the United Nations Security Council

- 8 June 2018

5 of 10 non-permanent seats on the United Nations Security Council
- United Nations Security Council membership after the election Permanent members Non-permanent members
- Outgoing members Ethiopia (Africa) Kazakhstan (Asia–Pacific) Bolivia (GRULAC) Sweden (WEOG) Netherlands (WEOG) Elected members South Africa (Africa) Indonesia (Asia–Pacific) Dominican Republic (GRULAC) Belgium (WEOG) Germany (WEOG)

The 2018 United Nations Security Council election was held on 8 June during the 72nd session of the United Nations General Assembly, held at United Nations Headquarters in New York City. The elections were for five non-permanent seats on the UN Security Council for two-year mandates commencing on 1 January 2019.

In accordance with the Security Council's rotation rules, whereby the ten non-permanent UNSC seats rotate among the various regional blocs into which UN member states traditionally divide themselves for voting and representation purposes, the five available seats are allocated as follows:

- One for the African Group
- One for the Asia-Pacific Group
- One for the Latin American and Caribbean Group
- Two for the Western European and Others Group

The five members served on the Security Council for the 2019–20 period.

In order of votes received, Germany and Belgium were elected in the Western European and Others Group, the Dominican Republic in the Latin American and Caribbean Group, and South Africa and Indonesia in the African and Asia-Pacific Groups. In addition, the Dominican Republic was elected to the Security Council for the first time.

== Candidates ==
=== African Group ===
- South Africa

=== Asia-Pacific Group ===
- Maldives
- Indonesia

=== Latin American and Caribbean Group ===
- Dominican Republic

=== Western European and Others Group ===
- Belgium
- Germany
- Israel – Withdrew in May 2018

The only contested seat was the Asia-Pacific one, between Indonesia and Maldives.

== Results ==
=== African and Asia-Pacific Groups ===
African and Asia-Pacific Groups election results
Member	Round 1
South Africa	183
Indonesia	144
Maldives	46
valid ballots	190
abstentions	0
present and voting	190
required majority	127

=== Latin American and Caribbean Group ===
Latin American and Caribbean Group election results
Member	Round 1
Dominican Republic	184
valid ballots	190
abstentions	6
present and voting	184
required majority	123

=== Western European and Others Group ===
Western European and Others Group election results
Member	Round 1
Germany	184
Belgium	181
valid ballots	190
abstentions	2
present and voting	188
required majority	126

== See also ==
- List of members of the United Nations Security Council
- Germany and the United Nations
- Israel and the United Nations
- Singapore and the United Nations
- European Union and the United Nations
