= Andrés Aguilar Mawdsley =

Venezuelan judge and jurist (1924–1995)

Andrés Aguilar Mawdsley (10 July 1924 – 24 October 1995) was a Venezuelan lawyer and diplomat. He represented his native country as ambassador to the United Nations and as envoy to the United States, and served as Venezuela's minister of justice from 1958 to 1962. From 1991 until his death, he served as a judge at the International Court of Justice.

== Life ==
Andrés Aguilar Mawdsley studied at the Universidad Central de Venezuela, where he earned a doctorate in political and social sciences, and at McGill University in Montreal, Canada, where he earned a master's degree in civil law. From 1948 he taught as a lecturer in civil law at the Universidad Central de Venezuela and from 1954 at the Universidad Católica Andrés Bello as well; in 1958 he was appointed professor at both universities.

From 1958 to 1962, he served as Minister of Justice of Venezuela. He then served as Venezuela's ambassador to the United Nations Office in Geneva from 1963 to 1965 and as permanent representative to UN headquarters in New York City from 1969 to 1972. During the period from 1972 to 1974, he served as Venezuela's Envoy Extraordinary and Plenipotentiary to the United States, after which he was Legal Counsel and Legal Representative of Petróleos de Venezuela, Venezuela's state-owned petroleum company, from 1975 to 1983. He was also a member of the Inter-American Commission on Human Rights from 1972 to 1985, during which time he served as president on several occasions.

From 1986 to 1991, he again represented his home country as a permanent representative to the United Nations in New York. In November 1990, he was elected by the Security Council and the United Nations General Assembly to serve as a judge at the International Court of Justice in The Hague. He took office in February 1991, but died in October 1995 about halfway through his nine-year rotating term. In keeping with the traditions of the Court, his compatriot Gonzalo Parra-Aranguren was elected to succeed Andrés Aguilar Mawdsley for the remainder of his term.

Andrés Aguilar Mawdsley belonged to the Academia de Ciencias Políticas y Sociales de Venezuela (Academy of Political and Social Sciences of Venezuela) since 1978 and was also a member of the Institut de Droit international since 1983.

== Publications ==
- Aceptación de la jurisdicción obligatoria de la Corte Internacional de Justicia - reservas a la clausula opcional. In: Revista de derecho público. 55/56, 1993, ISSN 1317-2719, S. 5–46.
- La jurisdicción contenciosa de la Corte Internacional de Justicia a la luz de la jurisprudencia de este alto tribunal. In: Manuel Rama-Montaldo (Hrsg.): El derecho internacional en un mundo en transformación - liber amicorum en homenaje al Profesor Eduardo Jiménez de Aréchaga. Fundación de Cultura Univ., Montevideo 1994, S. 1099–1128.
- La validez o nulidad de las sentencias arbitrales en el derecho internacional público. In: Revista de la Facultad de Ciencias Jurídicas y Políticas. 41, 1996, ISSN 0798-4456, S. 19–47.

== See also ==
- Judges of the International Court of Justice
