= Maritza Chan =

Costa Rican diplomat

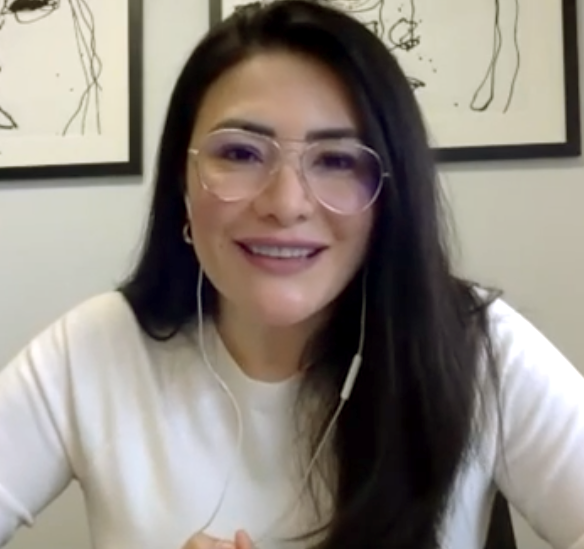
- In an online discussion in 2021

Permanent Representative of Costa Rica to the United Nations
- Incumbent
- Assumed office 15 August 2022
- Preceded by: Rodrigo Alberto Carazo Zeledón

Personal details
- Education: University of Costa Rica; Georgetown University

Maritza Chan Valverde is a Costa Rican diplomat. She has served as the first female permanent representative of Costa Rica to the United Nations since 2022. She is also the chairwoman of the United Nations Disarmament and International Security Committee since 2024 and served as vice president of the United Nations Economic and Social Council and the United Nations Commission on the Status of Women.

== Education ==
Chan got a degree in politician science from the University of Costa Rica and a master's degree in Latin American studies from Georgetown University.

== Career ==
Chan's first major job was as a senior speechwriter for President Miguel Ángel Rodríguez between 1998 and 2002. She subsequently worked in the United States, where she was a member of the Costa Rican Embassy from 2002 to 2005 and served at the mission to the Organization of American States from 2005 to 2009. Between 2010 and 2015, Chan worked at the permanent mission to the United Nations in New York, serving as Costa Rica's lead negotiator for the Arms Trade Treaty.

Upon returning to her country in 2015, she served as the OAS coordinator in Costa Rica. In 2018, she returned to Washington, D.C., to head the embassy's political section, and from 2020 to 2022, she served as Deputy Permanent Representative to the UN. She has served as vice chair of the UN Open-Ended Working Group on Conventional Ammunition.

On 15 August 2022, Chan was named permanent representative of Costa Rica to the United Nations, becoming the first female to hold this office.

In 2025, she was appointed vice president of the United Nations Economic and Social Council and Chan also served as vice president of the 69th session of the United Nations Commission on the Status of Women.

On 6 June 2024, the United Nations Disarmament and International Security Committee appointed her as its chairwoman, and she presided over the Fourth Review Conference of the United Nations Programme of Action to Prevent, Combat and Eradicate the Illicit Traffic in Small Arms and Light Weapons in All Its Aspects (UNPoA), which took place from 18 to 28 June 2024.

President of the 79th UN General Assembly Philémon Yang appointed her, alongside Spain's ambassador Héctor Gómez, facilitator of the intergovernmental consultations on the establishment and functioning of the Independent Global Scientific Panel on Artificial Intelligence and the Global Dialogue on AI Governance.

She is an expert in disarmament, nonproliferation, and arms control, as well as technology and international peace and security, and has written several articles on these topics.
