= United Nations Security Council Resolution 979 =

UN Security Council Resolution 979
- International Court of Justice
- Date: 9 March 1995
- Meeting no.: 3,507
- Code: S/RES/979 (Document)
- Subject: International Court of Justice
- Result: Adopted

Security Council composition
- Permanent members: China; France; Russia; United Kingdom; United States
- Non-permanent members: Argentina; Botswana; Czech Republic; Germany; Honduras; Indonesia; Italy; Nigeria; Oman; Rwanda

United Nations Security Council resolution 979, adopted without a vote on 9 March 1995, after noting the death of International Court of Justice (ICJ) judge Roberto Ago on 24 February 1995, the Council decided that elections to the vacancy on the ICJ would take place on 21 June 1995 at the Security Council and at a meeting of the General Assembly during its 49th session.

Ago, an Italian jurist, was a member of the court since 1979. His term of office was due to expire in February 1997.

== See also ==
- Judges of the International Court of Justice
- List of United Nations Security Council Resolutions 901 to 1000 (1994–1995)
