= Belgium and the United Nations =

Belgium

United Nations membership
- Membership: Full member
- Since: 27 December 1945
- UNSC seat: Non-permanent
- Permanent representative: Sophie Jang de Smedt

Belgium is one of the 51 founding members of the United Nations having signed the United Nations Conference on International Organization in 1945.

Belgium has been a non-permanent member of the UN Security Council for six terms (a total of 12 years), with the most recent being the 2019–20 term.

Belgium is a charter member of the United Nations and participates in all of its specialised agencies, except for the United Nations Industrial Development Organization and UN Tourism. Belgium has contributed 2 troops to United Nations peacekeeping efforts as of 2024.

== Classification ==
African Group Asia and the Pacific Group Eastern European Group Latin American and Caribbean Group Western European and Others Group

Belgium participates in the Western European and Others Group regional grouping. It is also part of the Western Europe geographical subregion.

== Activities ==
=== Funding ===
The regular budget of the United Nations is financed through compulsory contributions from its member states. From 2022 to 2024, Belgium contributed 0.828% of the UN regular budget. This placed Belgium as the 22nd nation by contribution amount.

=== Security Council ===
Belgium has held a non-permanent seat in the United Nations Security Council six times since its entry in 1945.

Security Council terms
Election	Votes (Pl.-Rd.)	Term
November 1946	43/54 (3rd-R1)	1947–48
1954	52/58 (3rd-R1)	1955–56
1970	104/113 (3rd-R1)	1971–72
1990	142/154 (4th-R1)	1991–92
2006	180/192 (2nd-GR1)	2007–08
2018	181/188 (2nd-GR1)	2019–20

=== Peacekeeping ===
As of September 2025, Belgium participates in one peacekeeping mission led by the UN.

Peacekeeping missions
Region	Mission	Personnel
Middle East and North Africa	United Nations Truce Supervision Organization (UNTSO)	1

== Positions held ==
Belgium has had one President of the United Nations General Assembly in Paul-Henri Spaak, who served in 1946 as the inaugural title-holder. Seven Belgian representatives have served as President of the United Nations Security Council and one Belgian representative has headed the Economic and Social Council. The nation has served on the United Nations Credentials Committee ten times.

There has been one Belgian permanent judge of the International Court of Justice. Additionally, eight Belgian judges have served on the court on an ad hoc basis.

Belgium has never held the Secretary-General of the United Nations or Deputy Secretary-General of the United Nations positions.

United Nations positions held
Position	Person	Term
President of the United Nations General Assembly	Paul-Henri Spaak	1946
Presidency of the United Nations Security Council	Fernand van Langenhove	February 1947, January 1948, December 1948, July 1955
Presidency of the United Nations Security Council	Josef Nisot	July 1956
Presidency of the United Nations Security Council	Edouard Longerstaey	April 1971, August 1972
Presidency of the United Nations Security Council	Paul Noterdaeme	April 1991, June 1992
Presidency of the United Nations Security Council	Johan Verbeke	June 2007
Presidency of the United Nations Security Council	Jan Grauls	August 2008
Presidency of the United Nations Security Council	Marc Pecsteen de Buytswerve	February 2020
President of the United Nations Economic and Social Council	Raymond Scheyven	1953, 1969
Permanent judges of the International Court of Justice	Charles de Visscher	1946-1952
Judges sitting ad hoc on the International Court of Justice	Philippe Couvreur	2018-present
Judges sitting ad hoc on the International Court of Justice	Patrick Ferdinand Duinslaeger	1999-2004
Judges sitting ad hoc on the International Court of Justice	W. J. Ganshof v.d. Meersch	1958-1970
Judges sitting ad hoc on the International Court of Justice	Philippe Kirsch	2009-2012
Judges sitting ad hoc on the International Court of Justice	François Rigaux	1989-2003
Judges sitting ad hoc on the International Court of Justice	Jean Salmon	1999-2001
Judges sitting ad hoc on the International Court of Justice	Joe Verhoeven	1999-2022
Judges sitting ad hoc on the International Court of Justice	Christine van den Wyngaert	2000-2002
United Nations Credentials Committee	—	1950, 1952, 1963, 1972, 1974, 1975, 1979, 1991, 2002, 2013

== Permanent representative ==
Belgium has a mission to the UN led by a permanent representative, also known as a UN Ambassador. The position is currently held by Sophie Jang de Smedt, who presented credentials in January 2025.

== See also ==
- Category:Belgium and the United Nations (6)
