= Roberto Córdova =

Mexican diplomat and jurist

Roberto Córdova (Mexico City, October 1899 – 1967) was a Mexican jurist, international judge, and diplomat. Córdova served as a judge for the International Court of Justice (ICJ) between 1955 and 1964. He was the second Mexican to serve as an ICJ judge, following Isidro Fabela.

Córdova was also a member of the United Nations International Law Commission between 1949 and 1955.

== Career ==
Roberto Córdova studied law at the Universidad Nacional Autónoma de México and attended the University of Texas, where he received a scholarship. During his athletic career he represented Mexico in the Olympic Games. He served as Mexico's agent in the United States-Mexico Claims Commission in the 1920s and subsequently represented Mexico in arbitration negotiations with the United States between 1937 and 1940.

Between 1938 and 1943, Córdova was a legal adviser to the Embassy of Mexico in Washington, D.C. He also served as the Mexican Ambassador to Costa Rica in 1943. Córdova was a diplomatic delegate for Mexico twice in 1945; first at the Chapultepec Conference, which laid the foundations for the Inter-American Treaty of Mutual Assistance, and the San Francisco Conference, at which the Charter of the United Nations was adopted.

Córdova served on two prominent international law bodies. From 1949 to 1954 he was a member of the newly established UN International Law Commission (ILC), and participated in early round discussions regarding the possibility of establishing an International Criminal Court.

In 1955 Córdova was elected as a judge to the International Court of Justice alongside Hersch Lauterpacht and Lucio Moreno Quintana. He served in this position until 1964. His contribution in the Nottebohm case to the legal status of "'real and effective' nationality in matters of dual or multiple nationality conflicts" has been described as "[memorable]." Córdova previously served as Special Rapporteur to the International Law Commission on "nationality, including statelessness" and his ILC report on the subject continues to be discussed today.

== Read more ==
- Roberto Córdova. In: Arthur Eyffinger, Arthur Witteveen, Mohammed Bedjaoui: La Cour Internationale de Justice 1946–1996. Martinus Nijhoff Publishers, The Hague and London 1999, ISBN 9-04-110468-2, p. 274
- Córdova, Roberto. In: Ronald Hilton (ed.): Who's Who in Latin America. Part I: Mexico. Third revised and expanded edition. Stanford University Press Stanford 1962, ISBN 0-80-470709-X, pp. 30
