= Gonzalo Parra-Aranguren =

Judge of the International Court of Justice
- In office 28 February 1996 – 6 February 2009
- Preceded by: Andrés Aguilar Mawdsley
- Succeeded by: Antônio Augusto Cançado Trindade

Personal details
- Born: 5 December 1928
- Died: 3 December 2016 (aged 87)

Gonzalo Parra-Aranguren (5 December 1928 – 3 December 2016) was a judge at the International Court of Justice in The Hague, Netherlands. He was born in Caracas, Venezuela, and was married to María Trinidad Pulido Santana. He served as a professor at The Hague Academy of International Law in 1988. He is the author of numerous legal textbooks.

== Works ==
- Die Regel "Locus Regit Actum" und die Formen der Testamente, 1955
- La Nacionalidad Venezolana Originaria, Vols. I and II, 1964
- La Constitución de 1830 y los Venezolanos por Naturalización, 1969
- Codificación del Derecho Internacional Privado en América, Vol. I, 1982; Vol. II, 1998
- La Nacionalidad Venezolana: I. Antecedentes Históricos, 1983
- La Influencia del Matrimonio sobre la Nacionalidad de la Mujer en la Legislación Venezolana, 1983
- La Nacionalidad Venezolana: II. Problemas Actuales, 1983
- Monografías Selectas de Derecho Internacional Privado, 1984
- Ensayos de Derecho Procesal Civil Internacional, 1986
- Curso General de Derecho Internacional Privado (Problemas Selectos), 1991
- Curso General de Derecho Internacional Privado. Problemas Selectos y Otros Estudios, 1992
- Curso General de Derecho Internacional Privado. Problemas Selectos y Otros Estudios, Tercera Edición, 1998
- Estudios de Derecho Procesal Civil Internacional, 1998
- Escritos Diversos de Derecho Internacional Privado, 1998
- Estudios de Derecho Mercantil Internacional, 1998
- El Régimen de los Bienes en el Matrimonio en el Derecho Internacional Privado Venezolano, 2007
- Padrino de la Promoción de abogados que lleva su nombre del año 1963 de la Universidad Central de Venezuela, Caracas
- Padrino de la Promoción de abogados que lleva su nombre del año 1979 de la Universidad Católica Andrés Bello', Caracas

== See also ==
- Judges of the International Court of Justice
