= Luigi Ferrari Bravo =

Italian judge (1933–2016)

Luigi Ferrari Bravo (5 August 1933 – 7 February 2016) was an Italian professor and legal expert who served as judge for the International Court of Justice in the 1990s.

== Biography ==
Born in Naples in 1933, Ferrari Bravo graduated in Law from the University of Naples in 1956, subsequently taking a post there as assistant professor of international law. He took on a professorship at the University of Bari before returning to Naples, eventually becoming Dean of the Department of Political Science.

He moved on to become professor of International Law at the University of Rome in the mid-1970s and served as legal adviser to the Minister for Foreign Affairs in Italy.

He served as a judge on the International Court of Justice from 1995 to 1997.

Eisenhower Fellowships selected Luigi Ferrari Bravo in 1969 to represent Italy.

Legal offices
Preceded by Roberto Ago	Judge of International Court of Justice; 1995–1997	Succeeded by Pieter Kooijmans
