= Fyodor Kozhevnikov =

Soviet jurist and legal expert (1903–1998)

- Фёдор Кожевников

Judge of the International Court of Justice
- In office 28 November 1953 – 1961
- Preceded by: Sergey Golunsky
- Succeeded by: Vladimir Koretsky

Personal details
- Born: 15 March 1903
- Died: 22 March 1998 (aged 95)

Fyodor Ivanovich Kozhevnikov (Russian: Фёдор Иванович Кожевников; 15 March 1903 – 22 March 1998) was a Soviet jurist and legal expert.

He wrote extensively about international law aspects in Russian history, and his writing supported Russian nationalist interpretation rather than Marxist–Leninist ideas. His main argument was that the Russian state, both in Tsarist times as well as under the Soviets, was the most progressive civilization in the field of international law.

== Legal career ==
During World War II, Kozhevninkov served as the Dean of the Faculty of Law at Moscow State University. From 1952 to 1953 represented his country at the International Law Commission. In November 1953, was appointed as judge at the International Court of Justice, a position he held until 1961. He also served as a judge at the Permanent Court of Arbitration.

== Works (partial list) ==
- Mezhdunarodnyi Dogovor [International Agreements] (Moscow, 1947)
- Russkoe Gosudarstvo i Mezhdunarodnoe Pravo (do XX Veka) [The Russian Government and International Law (until the 20th Century] (Moscow, 1947)
- Sovetskoe Gosudarstvo i Mezhdunarodnoe Pravo 1917–1947 gg [The Soviet Government and International Law 1917-1947] (Moscow, 1948)
- Velikaia Otechestvennaia Voina Sovetskogo Soiuza i Nekotorye Voprosy Mezhdunarodnogo Prava [The Great Patriotic War of the Soviet Union and Certain Questions of International Law] (Moscow, 1954)
- Kurs Mezhdunarodnogo Prava [A Course in International Law] (Moscow, 2nd edition, 1966)
