= Mohsen Aghahosseini =

Iranian judge and arbitrator

- Born: 22 January 1975 (age 51); Tehran, Iran
- Occupations: Judge; Jurist

Academic background
- Education: University of Tehran; University of London; University of Oxford
- Thesis: A Comparative Study of the Alternatives to Strict Liability in Criminal Law (1978)

Mohsen Aghahosseini (Persian: محسن آقاحسینی; born 22 January 1975) is an Iranian judge and arbitrator whose arguments and opinions have been subject of scholarly reviews.

== Early life and education ==
Aghahosseini was born on 22 January 1945. He graduated from University of Tehran in 1967, and subsequently obtained degrees from University of Oxford (B. Litt.) and University of London (Dipl. in Law; LL.M.).

== Career ==
He was a long-time designated judge on the Iran–United States Claims Tribunal (IUSCT), and was an International Court of Justice (ICJ) ad hoc judge for Aerial Incident of 3 July 1988 (Islamic Republic of Iran v. United States of America) case. Aghahosseini was appointed by the National Iranian Oil Company to the panel in NIOC v Israel case of Swiss Federal Supreme Court.

== Bibliography ==
Books

- Aghahosseini, Mohsen (2007), Claims of Dual Nationals and the Development of Customary International Law: Issues Before the Iran-United States Claims Tribunal, Brill/Nijhoff, doi:10.1163/ej.9789004156982.i-310, ISBN 978-90-47-42127-6

Papers

- Aghahosseini, Mohsen (March 1997), "The Claims of Dual Nationals Before the Iran-United States Claims Tribunal: Some Reflections", Leiden Journal of International Law, 10 (1), Cambridge University Press: 21–47, doi:10.1017/S0922156597000034, S2CID 143789029
- "The Iran-United States Claims Tribunal Report of Its Activities in the Year 2007", The Global Community, Yearbook of International Law and Jurisprudence (2): 1579–1588, 2008, SSRN 2231012 (co-authored with Zahra Mousavi)
- "The Burden and Standard of Proof in the Case Law of the Iran-United States Claims Tribunal", The Global Community, 1: 105–124, 2007, SSRN 2226971 (co-authored with Zahra Mousavi)

== See also ==
- Judges of the International Court of Justice
