= Roberto Ago =

Italian jurist

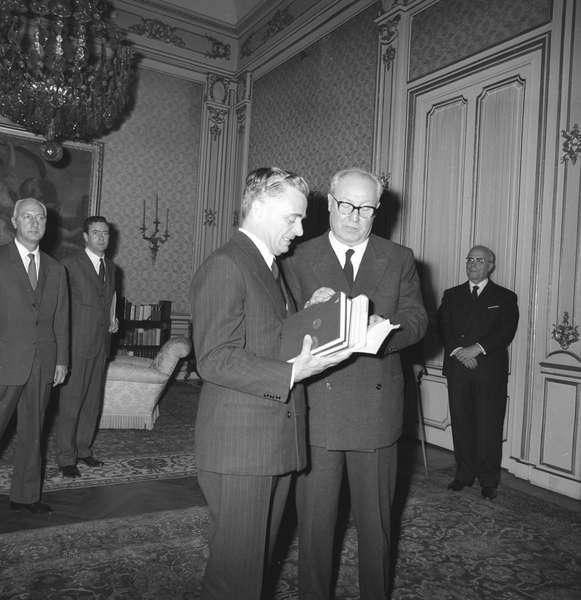
- Roberto Ago with Giuseppe Saragat, 5th President of the Italian Republic, 1965

Judge on the International Court of Justice
- In office 1979–1995

Roberto Ago (26 May 1907 – 24 February 1995) was an Italian jurist. He served as a judge on the International Court of Justice from 1979 until 1995. He was Professor of International Law at the Universities of Catania (1934–1935), Genoa (1935–1938), and finally Rome (1956–1982). He specialized in both private and public international law.

== Biography ==
He gave his first Hague Academy of International Law lecture in 1936 at the age of twenty-eight, on general conflict of laws rules. He also gave lectures at the Hague Academy of International Law in 1939, 1956, 1971, and 1983, on topics ranging from international torts to the Grotian conception of international law. He also served as Chairman of the Hague Academy Curatorium for the last 20 years of his life. In 1970 Ago was awarded honorary membership in the American Society of International Law. He served as a delegate to international conferences on the law of the sea and on diplomatic relations. In addition, Ago presided over the Vienna Conference on the Law of Treaties from 1968 to 1969. He also acted as counsel for several governments appearing before the International Court of Justice. He was a member of the International Law Commission from 1956 to 1979 and served as its chairman from 1964 to 1965. Former ICJ judge Stephen M. Schwebel said that Ago, through his work with the International Law Commission, had an "extended and preeminent" role in the codification work of the International Law Commission. He also worked closely with the International Labour Organization, twice presiding over the ILO Governing Body. For the last thirty-five years of his life, Ago chaired the ILO Committee on Freedom of Association. Ago was also an active member of the Institut du Droit International from 1932 until his death, serving as its president from 1992 to 1993.

He was a critic of legal positivism.

Roberto Ago died on 24 February 1995 in Geneva. Sir Robert Jennings wrote that Ago "is an international lawyer who has excelled in all the several different aspects of that calling: as scholar and writer; as teacher; as consultant to governments and international organizations; as fashioner of law through the International Law Commission; as advocate; and as judge." Nicolas Valticos explained that: "as was the practice in Italian universities, he specialized in both private and public international law. But what is not usual is that he became an authority on both branches".

His term of office at the International Court of Justice was due to expire in February 1997.

== Partial list of works ==
- Eight reports to the United Nations Law Commission on the "Internationally Wrongful Act of the State, Source of International Responsibility" (1969–1979)
- Positivism (International Law), 7 Encyclopedia of Public International Law 385 (Rudolf Bernhardt ed., 1984)
- La Codification du Droit International et les Problèmes de sa Réalisation, Recueil d'Études de Droit International en Hommage à Paul Guggenheim 93 (1968)
- Pluralism and the Origins of the International Community, 3 Ital. Y.B. Int'l L. 3 (1977)
- The First International Communities in the Mediterranean World, 53 Brit. Y.B. Int'l L. 2113 (1982)
- Lezioni di diritto internazionale privato: parte generale (Milano: A. Giuffrè, 1955)

== See also ==
- Judges of the International Court of Justice
- United Nations Security Council Resolution 979

== Notes ==
Legal offices
Preceded by Federico de Castro	Judge of International Court of Justice; 1979–1995	Succeeded by Luigi Ferrari Bravo
