= Eduardo Jiménez de Aréchaga =

Uruguayan professor & jurist (1918–1994)

Member of the International Law Commission
- In office 1960–1969

Member of the International Court of Justice
- In office 1970–1979

President of the International Court of Justice
- In office 1976–1979

Personal details
- Born: 1918
- Died: April 5, 1994 (aged 75)
- Education: University of Uruguay

H. E. Eduardo Jiménez de Aréchaga (Montevido, 1918 – Punta del Este, 5 April 1994) was an Uruguayan professor, jurist, and President of the International Court of Justice.

== Biography ==
=== Early life ===
Eduardo Jiménez de Aréchaga was born in Montevido in 1918, and received a Doctor of Law degree from the University of Uruguay in 1942. From 1946 to 1969, he would be a professor of Public International Law at the Montevido Law School.

=== Professional career ===
Jiménez de Aréchaga held a seat on the United Nations' International Law Commission from 1960 to 1969, serving as President in 1963. He was the president of the ad hoc court of arbitration that was established by Canada and France to decide the 1992 Canada–France Maritime Boundary Case. He was also President of the arbitral tribunal for the "Rainbow Warrior" case between New Zealand and France (1989-1990).

He lectured at the Hague Academy of International Law.

He then served as a judge on the International Court of Justice (ICJ or "World Court") between 1970 and 1979, including a period as President of the ICJ from 1976 to 1979.

=== Death ===
Aréchaga died in a car accident in Punta del Este, Uruguay, on April 5, 1994.

== Published works ==
- Derecho Constitucional de las Naciones Unidas - JSOTR
- Introducción al Derecho - ISBN 978-9974-2-0661-8
- Tratado de derecho Internacional Público. T.1 - ISBN 978-9974-2-0575-8
- Tratado de derecho Internacional Público. T.2 - ISBN 978-9974-2-0959-6
- Tratado de derecho Internacional Público. T.3 - ISBN 978-9974-2-0844-5
- Tratado de derecho Internacional Público. T.4 - ISBN 978-9974-2-0972-5
- Voting and the Handling of Disputes in the Security Council - ISBN 978-0313203329

== Awards ==
- The Manley O. Hudson Award, 1978
