= 2018 International Court of Justice judges election =

The 2018 International Court of Justice election was held on 22 June 2018 at the United Nations Headquarters in New York City. The General Assembly and the Security Council concurrently elected Yuji Iwasawa (Japan) to the International Court of Justice until 5 February 2021. He served the remainder of the nine-year term of office that had been held by Hisashi Owada (Japan), whose resignation from the Court took effect on 7 June 2018.

Judge Iwasawa was elected in the General Assembly by a vote of 184 in favor to zero against, with five abstentions, and unanimously by the Security Council. Judge Owada resigned because of his old age and the fact that his daughter Masako, then Crown Princess of Japan, was set to become the Empress of Japan the following year.

== Background ==
By a letter dated 6 February 2018, Judge Owada informed the President of the International Court of Justice, pursuant to Article 13, paragraph 4, of the Statute of the International Court of Justice, of his resignation as a member of the ICJ, effective 7 June 2018.

According to Article 14 of the Statute of the ICJ, the vacancy shall be filled by the same method as that laid down for the regular election, and the Secretary-General shall, within one month of the occurrence of the vacancy, issue the invitations for nominations provided for in Article 5 of the Statute. According to Article 5, paragraph 1, of the Statute, the invitations for nominations shall be made at least three months before the date of the election, which, pursuant to Article 14, shall be fixed by the Security Council.

By a note dated 19 February 2018, the Secretary-General of the United Nations informed the Security Council of the resignation of Judge Owada and drew its attention to Article 14 of the Statute of the Court with regard to the fixing of the date of the election. Pursuant to that Article, the Security Council decided, by its resolution 2403 (2018), adopted on 28 February 2018, that the election to fill the vacancy would take place on 22 June 2018 at a meeting of the Security Council and at a meeting of the General Assembly.

Pursuant to Article 5, paragraph 1, of the Statute of the ICJ, the Under-Secretary-General for Legal Affairs and United Nations Legal Counsel, in communications dated 23 February 2018 and on behalf of the Secretary-General, invited the national groups of States parties to the Statute to undertake the nomination of persons in a position to accept the duties of a member of the Court. The Legal Counsel further requested that nominations be received no later than 16 May 2018.

The resigning Judge Owada had been a member of the Court since 6 February 2003. Judge Owada was re-elected as from 6 February 2012 and served as President of the Court from 6 February 2009 to 5 February 2012. His term of office would have expired on 5 February 2021. Article 15 of the Statute of the Court provides that a member of the Court elected to replace a member whose term of office has not expired shall hold office for the remainder of the predecessor's term. Thus, the newly elected member was to serve from the election until 5 February 2021.

== Candidates ==
By a communication dated 23 February 2018 addressed by the Under-Secretary-General for Legal Affairs and United Nations Legal Counsel on behalf of the Secretary-General to the national groups of the States parties to the Statute of the International Court of Justice, attention was drawn to the vacancy in the Court caused by the resignation of Judge Owada, effective 7 June 2018. In accordance with Article 5, paragraph 1, of the Statute of the ICJ, national groups were thus invited to undertake the nomination of persons in a position to accept the duties of a member of the Court and to submit such nominations no later than 16 May 2018.

After the established deadline for nominating candidates, 16 May 2018, a national group submitted a nomination to the UN Secretariat. There was only one nominated candidate for the 2018 election:

Name	Nationality	Nominated by the "national groups" of
Yuji Iwasawa	Japan	Argentina, Australia, Austria, Bolivia, Chile, China, Colombia, Czechia, Estonia, Finland, France, Greece, Guatemala, Hungary, Ireland, Italy, Japan, Jordan, Laos, Latvia, Lithuania, Luxembourg, Malta, Mexico, Morocco, New Zealand, Peru, Philippines, Portugal, Romania, Russian Federation, Serbia, Singapore, Slovakia, Spain, Sri Lanka, Sweden, Thailand, United Kingdom, United States of America, Uruguay, Viet Nam

== Election ==
Under the terms of the Statute of the ICJ, a candidate obtaining an absolute majority of votes in the General Assembly and the Security Council is considered elected. In the General Assembly, all 193 Member States in the General Assembly are electors. Accordingly, for the election, 97 votes constitute an absolute majority in the Assembly. In the Security Council, eight votes constitute an absolute majority and no distinction is made between its permanent and non‑permanent members.

Candidate	Round 1; 22 June 2018	
Candidate	GA	SC
(Japan) Yuji Iwasawa	184	15
