= Malaysia and the United Nations =

Malaysia

United Nations membership
- Represented by: Federation of Malaya (1957–1963)
- Membership: Full member
- Since: 17 September 1957
- UNSC seat: Non-permanent
- Permanent Representative: H.E. Dato’ Dr. Ahmad Faisal bin Muhamad

Malaysia became the 82nd member of the United Nations on 17 September 1957 (when it was then known as the Federation of Malaya). Malaysia has held a rotational non-permanent seat on the United Nations Security Council for four terms, and has participated in over 30 United Nations peacekeeping missions through its MALBATT (Malaysia Battalion) contingent since October 1960.

== History ==
Soon after declaring independence on 31 August 1957, Prime Minister Tunku Abdul Rahman wrote to the United Nations Secretary-General Dag Hammarskjöld to express Malaya's interest to join the United Nations. On 17 September 1957, the twelfth session of the United Nations General Assembly, presided by Sir Leslie Munroe (New Zealand), unanimously agreed to admit Malaya as its 82nd member through resolution 1134(XII).

Tun Dr. Ismail Abd Rahman was appointed as Malaya and Malaysia's first ambassador to the United States of America, as well as the United Nations – two posts which he held concurrently from 1957 till 1959.

On 16 September 1963, Malaya merged with the former British colonies of Singapore, North Borneo and Sarawak to form Malaysia. However, less than two years after the merger, Singapore was expelled from the federation.

== Activities ==
Malaysia is a strong proponent of multilateralism and international cooperation. Malaysia's presence in the United Nations, among others, is to formulate, coordinate, defend and advance Malaysia's positions and interests on all three pillars of the United Nations (Peace and Security, Human Rights and Development).

=== General Assembly ===
On 17 September 1996, Razali Ismail was elected President of the United Nations General Assembly's 51st session. At the time of his election, he was serving as Malaysia's ambassador to Cuba and its High Commissioner to Barbados, Jamaica, Saint Lucia, and Trinidad and Tobago. He was the third representative from Southeast Asia to preside over the world body after Dr. Carlos Pena Romulo (the Philippines) and Adam Malik (Indonesia). Razali Ismail presided the General Assembly's 51st session from 17 September 1996 to 15 September 1997.

Malaysia served as Vice-President of the General Assembly six times – specifically at its 20th session (1965-1966), 39th session (1984-1985), 41st session (1986-1987), 46th session (1991-1992), 60th session (2005-2006), and 68th session (2013-2014). In June 2022, Malaysia was elected by the Assembly to serve as Vice-President of the General Assembly at its 77th session (2022-2023).

=== Security Council ===
Malaysia served as a non-permanent member of the Security Council for four terms in 1965 (with Czechoslovakia), 1989–1990, 1999–2000 and 2015–2016. In 2015, Malaysia introduced a draft resolution, calling for the establishment of an international criminal tribunal, in response to the downing of Malaysia Airlines Flight 17. The resolution, however, failed to pass as a result of Russia's veto.

On 23 December 2016, resolution 2334 (2016) sponsored by Malaysia made history as the first resolution adopted by the Security Council on the Israeli-Palestinian conflict in eight years. Adopting the resolution with 14 votes in favor, with the United States abstaining, the Security Council reaffirmed that Israel's establishment of settlements in Palestinian territory occupied since 1967, including East Jerusalem, had no legal validity, constituting a flagrant violation under international law and a major obstacle to the vision of two States living side by side in peace and security, within internationally recognized borders. The council also reiterated its demand that Israel immediately and completely cease all settlement activities in the occupied Palestinian territory, including East Jerusalem.

=== Human Rights Council ===
Malaysia served as a member of the Human Rights Council twice in 2006–2009 and 2010–2013. Malaysia is currently serving its third term in the Council (from 2022 until 2024) after securing 183 votes at the elections held during the 76th Session of the United Nations General Assembly on 14 October 2021.

=== Peacekeeping and observer missions ===
In October 1960, Malaysia deployed its first contingent of 3,500 Malay Special Forces of the then Malayan Armed Forces to the United Nations Operation in the Congo. Since then, Malaysia has participated in 39 United Nations peacekeeping operations with the deployment of nearly 40,000 peacekeepers from the Malaysian Armed Forces and the Royal Malaysian Police - a clear manifestation of Malaysia's strong commitment to shared responsibilities towards the early and peaceful resolution of conflicts. As of June 2022, Malaysia ranks 25th out of 121 troop-contributing countries.

Malaysia also participated in other UN-mandated missions such as the Protection Force in Bosnia and Herzegovina, Mission in East Timor, Transition Assistance Group in Namibia, International Security Assistance Force in Afghanistan (ISAF), United Nations Transition Assistance Group, Interim Force in Lebanon, Operation in Somalia, and the International Monitoring Team (IMT) in Mindanao.

Through the Malaysian Peacekeeping Centre (MPC), Malaysia is committed to provide training and capacity building on multi-dimensional peacekeeping for international military, police and civilian personnel who will be embarking on UN peacekeeping missions in conflict areas around the world.

=== Disarmament ===
Malaysia consistently advocates for the cause of nuclear disarmament in the international fora, and supports all efforts towards the total elimination of nuclear weapons.

From 27 April to 22 May 2019, Malaysia, represented by Ambassador Syed Mohamad Hasrin Aidid, chaired the third and final preparatory committee for the 2020 Review Conference of the Treaty on the Non-Proliferation of Nuclear Weapons (NPT). The NPT has played an invaluable role in the preservation of international peace and security for the past five decades, by preventing the proliferation of nuclear weapons, and imposing a legal obligation on the five Nuclear Weapon States to eliminate their nuclear arsenals, towards a nuclear-weapon-free world.

2020 marked the 50th anniversary since the Treaty's entry into force in 1970, and the 25th anniversary of its indefinite extension in 1995. The 10th NPT Review Conference, initially scheduled to take place from 27 April until 22 May 2020, was postponed to a later date in view of the COVID-19 pandemic. The Review Conference was eventually held at the United Nations Headquarters in New York from 1 to 26 August 2022. Malaysia, represented by Ambassador Syed Mohamad Hasrin Aidid, chaired Main Committee I on Nuclear Disarmament at the Conference.

== Representation ==
Malaysia has three permanent missions to the United Nations. Ambassador Dato’ Dr. Ahmad Faisal Muhamad heads the Malaysian Mission in New York. The post of the Malaysian Ambassador to Vienna is currently vacant. Ambassador Dato' Nadzirah Osman heads the Malaysian Mission in Geneva.

== UN Agencies in Malaysia ==
There are seven UN agencies with a physical presence in Malaysia namely the United Nations Development Programme (UNDP), United Nations High Commissioner for Refugees (UNHCR), United Nations Population Fund (UNFPA), United Nations Children's Fund (UNICEF), World Health Organization (WHO), United Nations University (UNU) and the World Food Programme (WFP).

== Financial contribution ==
In 2023, Malaysia contributed USD10.18 million to the United Nations regular budget and was included in the year's Honour Roll.

== See also ==
- Member states of the United Nations
- Foreign relations of Malaysia
