= Azerbaijan and the United Nations =

Republic of Azerbaijan

United Nations membership
- Membership: Full member
- Since: 2 March 1992
- UNSC seat: Non-permanent
- Ambassador: Yashar Aliyev

Azerbaijan has been a member of the United Nations since March 2, 1992, after the UN General Assembly admitted Azerbaijan at its 46th session. The Permanent Mission of the Republic of Azerbaijan was opened in New York City in May 1992. On October 29, 1991, soon after gaining independence from the Soviet Union, Azerbaijan applied to the UN General Assembly for joining the organization. Azerbaijan was elected as a non-permanent member of the UN Security Council for the 2012–2013 term.

== History ==
=== UN and Nagorno-Karabakh Conflict ===
Azerbaijan used the platform of the United Nations to draw attention to the Nagorno-Karabakh conflict, to provide the international community with comprehensive information in order to shape an objective public opinion, to use the United Nations potential for peaceful settlement of the conflict. During 1992-1993 the UN Security Council adopted four resolutions (822, 853, 874 and 884) and made six statements of the UNSC President on the Armenian-Azerbaijani conflict. They confirmed the territorial integrity of Azerbaijan, condemned the occupation of the Nagorno-Karabakh region, demanded the immediate cease-fire, suspension of hostilities and withdrawal of all occupying forces from the territory of the Republic of Azerbaijan. The Armenian side partially complied with some of the demands of the Security Council and has totally ignored the demand to withdraw its forces from all occupied territories. Expressing a deep concern on the humanitarian situation in Azerbaijan continued deteriorating extensively, and the number of refugees and internally displaced persons (IDP) in Azerbaijan, which exceeded 1 million, the UN General Assembly adopted resolution "Emergency international assistance to refugees and displaced persons in Azerbaijan" (A/RES/48/114) at the 85th plenary meeting in 1993. "During the period of 1992 to 1996 the UN Secretary-General and the Security Council President made several statements on the conflict confirming the territorial integrity and sovereignty of the Republic of Azerbaijan and supporting the OSCE Minsk Group’s efforts towards its peaceful settlement. The UN General Assembly in its resolution "Cooperation between United Nations and Organization for Security and Cooperation in Europe (OSCE)" reaffirmed territorial integrity of Azerbaijan ("the conflict in and around the Nagorno-Karabakh region of the Republic of Azerbaijan")". In 1994 the UN Secretary-General B.Butros Ghali visited Baku. This meeting had a great significance in developing the relations between Azerbaijan and the UN. Being closely informed about the socio-political devastating consequences and economic losses as a result of Armenia's aggression against Azerbaijan, the UN Secretary-General took the decision to strengthen support and engagement of the UN agencies and institutions to resolve existing troubles and problems.

=== Past UN and Azerbaijan Relations ===
"The first United Nations office in Azerbaijan opened in November 1992 in the Respublica Hotel in Baku. This integrated office housed international staff from the UN Secretariat and the UN Development Programme (UNDP) as well as a few national staff. By the end of 1993, it was relocated to the current UN Office, which was generously donated by the Government of Azerbaijan. Shortly after, the UN High Commissioner for Refugees (UNHCR), UN Children’s Fund (UNICEF) and the World Food Programme (WFP) opened their offices at the same location".

Within a few years, the UN expanded to include the UN Department of Humanitarian Affairs, UN Population Fund, World Health Organization, International Labour Organization, Food and Agriculture Organization, Office of the High Commissioner for Human Rights, International Fund for Agricultural Development and UN Joint Programme on AIDS many of which are still present in Azerbaijan in 2017.

In 2000, the Government of Azerbaijan began to cooperate on the achievement of the Millennium Development Goals (MDGs) and partnered with the UN Agencies in the fight against poverty. As a result, poverty has been reduced in the last 25 years dramatically. "The efforts of the Government and the UN have also translated into an improved Human Development Index (HDI) in Azerbaijan, which has increased by 30 per cent between 1995 and 2015. Azerbaijan’s gross national income (GNI) per capita increased by approximately 87.8 per cent between 1990 and 2015".

Azerbaijan has also contributed to the work of the UN General Assembly. Azerbaijan was elected as a member of the UNICEF Executive Board (1995-1997 and 1998–2000), the Commission on the Status of Women (2000-2002), the Committee on Sustainable Development (2002-2004), the UN Human Rights Council (2006-2009) and the UN Economic and Social Council (2003-2005 and 2017–2019). Most recently, Azerbaijan became a member of the ILO Governing Body for the period of 2017–2020. Azerbaijan has also been a sponsor or co-sponsor of a number of resolutions adopted by UN bodies, for instance, the Commission on the Status of Women's annual resolution “Release of women and children taken hostage, including those subsequently imprisoned, in armed conflicts”. In 2002, Azerbaijan initiated a resolution on “missing persons” at the Commission on Human Rights (now known as the Human Rights Council).

UNICEF provided humanitarian assistance to Azerbaijan in the amount of $9.5 million between 1994 and 1996, $2.2 million in 1997, $2 million per year in 1998 and 1999. Within the framework of cooperation between Azerbaijan and UNICEF, the projects of "Early childhood development and the initiative of a better parent", "Active learning and school", "Education for development and Convention on the Rights of Child", "Improvement of information and analysis in education", "Health and development of the youth", "Creation of parent-teacher Associations, "Education on the landmine threat" were implemented between 2000 and 2004.

National Commission for UNESCO was established in 1994 in accordance with the Decree of the President of Azerbaijan. Cooperating with United Nations Education, Science and Cultural Organization (UNESCO) assisted to develop the spheres of education, science and culture in Azerbaijan. The First Vice-president of Azerbaijan Mehriban Aliyeva designated UNESCO Goodwill Ambassador in September 2004.

In 2016, the United Nations and the Government of Azerbaijan concluded a new cooperation agreement with the signing of the United Nations-Azerbaijan Partnership Framework (UNAPF) for the period of 2016–2020. This is the fourth cooperation document to have been signed between the United Nations agencies and the Government which marks a transition from assistance-based to a partnership-based cooperation. The framework was guided by the country's development aspirations as set out in ‘Azerbaijan – 2020: The Vision of the Future’ and was developed following inclusive and participatory consultations with a number of partners.

== Present situation ==
The mutual relations between Azerbaijan and the UN developed rapidly in many fields.

Azerbaijan joined the United Nations Development Programme (UNDP) and the United Nations Industry Development Organization (UNIDO) and implemented different projects and programmes in order to improve living standards, structural adjustments of the economy in close cooperation with these organizations.

So far different UN agencies have implemented about 50 projects which are totally cost $96.6 million. Presently United Nations Development Program (UNDP) is implementing 10 projects in different fields in Azerbaijan.

UN's Food and Agriculture Organization (FAO) is implementing three national projects in Azerbaijan. One of these projects which amounts $400,000, is to cultivate a virus-free potato seed.

The other projects of FAO, costing of $350,000 and $200,000, are aimed at developing organic agriculture and extending the abilities of the Ministry of Agriculture and other relevant organizations in marketing agrarian products.

UN-Azerbaijan Partnership Framework (UNAPF) is aimed at supporting the development and diversification of the economy, increasing institutional capacity and protecting environment.

=== Azerbaijani Youth and UN ===
Azerbaijan is also closely working with UNDP especially in the development of Azerbaijani youth. The joint project of the Ministry of Youth and Sport of the Republic of Azerbaijan and UNDP Azerbaijan called “Creating new platforms to support active youth engagement in global policy debates”. The initiative aims to support the institutionalization of Model UN in Azerbaijan through the establishment of the Model UN clubs in the universities and academic institutions of the country. The major outputs of this component of the project include the creation of a national network of Model UN.

Another project realized in the framework of “Creating new platforms to support active youth engagement in global policy debates” is the Sustainable Development Goals Youth Ambassadors initiative jointly implemented by the Ministry of Youth and Sport of the Republic of Azerbaijan and UNDP Azerbaijan. The main objective of Youth Ambassadors is to promote Sustainable Development Goals in Azerbaijan, encourage youth participation in obtaining SDGs and contribute to spreading the information about activities realized on local and national levels, as well as to contribute to the development of National Reports.

== Documents ==
List of documents adopted by the United Nations on the Armenian-Azerbaijani conflict:

=== Resolutions of Security Council of UN ===
	Resolutions	Place	Date	Sources
1	Resolution 822	At 3205th meeting of Security Council	30 April 1993	
2	Resolution 853	At 3259th meeting of Security Council	29 July 1993	
3	Resolution 874	At 3292nd meeting of Security Council	14 October 1993	
4	Resolution 884	At 3313th meeting of Security Council	12 November 1993	

	Resolutions	Place	Date	Sources
1	"Emergency international assistance to refugees and displaced persons in Azerbaijan"	At the 85th plenary meeting	23 March 1994	
2	:The situation in the occupied territories of Azerbaijan	At the 98th plenary meeting	15 September 2006	
3	The situation in the occupied territories of Azerbaijan	At the 86th plenary meeting	25 April 2008	

=== Statements of Security Council of UN ===
	Statements	Place	Date	Sources
1	S/23904	At the 3072nd meeting of Security Council	12 May 1992	
2	S/24493		26 August 1992	
3	S/24721	At the 3127th meeting of Security Council	27 October 1992	
4	S/25199		29 January 1992	
5	S/25539		6 April 1993	
6	S/26326		18 August 1993	
7	S/PRST/1995/21	At the 3525th meeting of the Security Council	26 April 1995	

== See also ==
- Soviet Union and the United Nations
