= Germany and the United Nations =

Federal Republic of Germany

United Nations membership
- Membership: Full member
- Since: 18 September 1973
- Former name(s): Federal Republic of Germany (1973–1990)
- UNSC seat: Non-permanent (G4 member)
- Ambassador: Antje Leendertse

German Democratic Republic

United Nations membership
- Membership: Former full member
- Dates: 18 September 1973 – 3 October 1990
- UNSC seat: Non-permanent (elected once)

The relationship of Germany and the United Nations first began during World War II. The United Nations then was synonymous with the Allies of World War II and Germany then being the Greater German Reich, a member of the Axis powers. With the war ending in the defeat of Germany, the country's territory was divided amongst the victors and what was to remain Germany was under Allied administration. In 1949, two new countries were created in these occupied territories: the Federal Republic of Germany (West Germany) in May and the German Democratic Republic (East Germany) in October.

Both Germanies were admitted as full members of the United Nations (UN) on 18 September 1973. The two countries eventually merged on 3 October 1990, signifying an end of the Cold War era.

Germany is the fourth largest contributor to the UN budget. Germany contributes 6.09 percent of this budget, or approximately 176 million US dollars.

== History ==
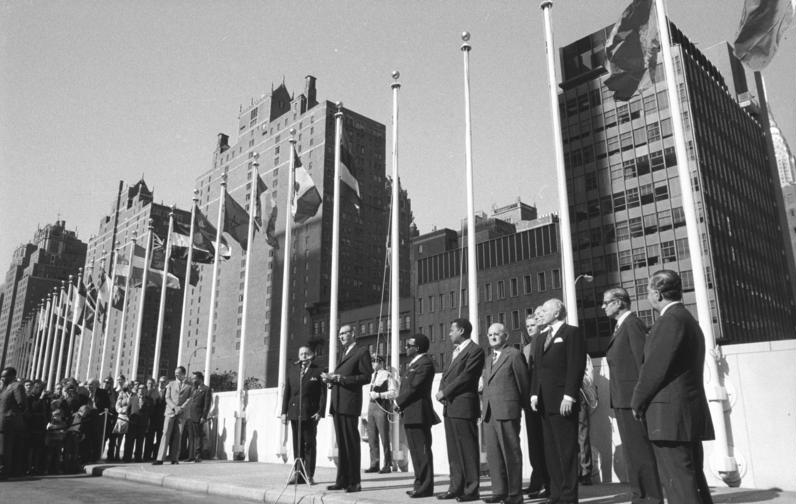
Hoisting of the two German flags outside the UN building in New York on 18 September 1973

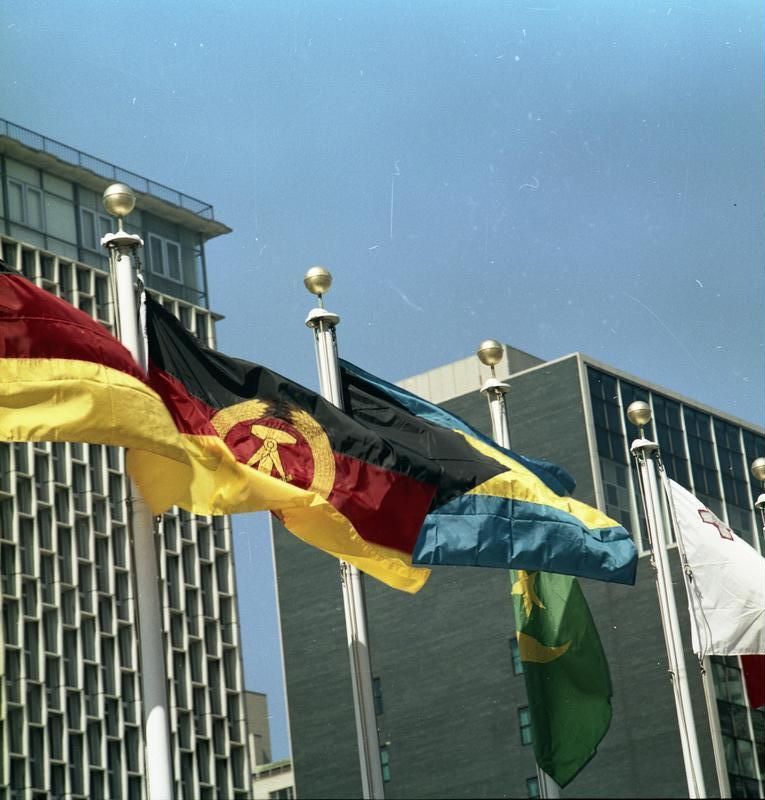
Flags of the two Germanies at the United Nations in 1973

The Federal Republic of Germany (West Germany) was admitted to the UN as an observer in 1952. The German Democratic Republic (East Germany) was admitted as an observer in 1972. On 18 September 1973 both were admitted as full members by the United Nations General Assembly, following the recommendation of the Security Council by Resolution 335 on 22 June 1973. Through the accession of the German Democratic Republic to the Federal Republic of Germany, effective on 3 October 1990, the territory of the German Democratic Republic became part of the Federal Republic of Germany, today simply known as Germany. Consequently, the Federal Republic of Germany continued being a member of the UN while the German Democratic Republic ceased to exist.

== 2011–2012 UNSC seat ==
For the years of 2011 to 2012 Germany has been elected as a non-permanent member of the United Nations Security Council (UNSC). However, Germany received criticism from its European and US allies for abstaining on the Resolution to intervene in Libya that they were voting for. Former German Foreign Minister Joschka Fischer argued that "Germany has lost its credibility in the United Nations and in the Middle East. German hopes for a permanent seat on the Security Council have been permanently dashed and one is now fearful of Europe's future."

== Permanent UNSC seat ==
France and the United Kingdom have explicitly called for a permanent seat on the UN Security Council for their close EU partner. French president Jacques Chirac said in a speech in Berlin in 2000 that "Germany's engagement, its ranking as a great power, its international influence—France would like to see them recognized with a permanent seat on the Security Council". The former German Chancellor, Gerhard Schröder, also identified Russia, among other countries, as a country that backed Germany's bid. Italy and the Netherlands on the contrary, suggest a common European Union (EU) seat in the Council instead of Germany becoming the second European member next to France (and the former EU member, the UK). The former German Foreign Minister Joschka Fischer said that Germany would also accept a common European seat; however, as long as France and the UK are not willing to give up their own seats, Germany should also have a seat. Thus, the German campaign for a permanent seat was intensified in 2004. Schröder made himself perfectly clear in August 2004: "Germany has the right to a seat." Its bid is supported by Japan, India, Brazil, France, the United Kingdom and Russia, among other countries. Former German Chancellor Angela Merkel, who had initially been quiet on the issue, re-stated Germany's bid in her address to the UN General Assembly in September 2007. In July 2011, Merkel's trip to Kenya, Angola, and Nigeria was thought to be motivated, in part, by the goal of seeking support from African countries for Germany's bid for a permanent seat on the Security Council.

== See also ==
- European Union and the United Nations
- France and the United Nations
- Sweden and the United Nations
- United Kingdom and the United Nations
- G4 nations
