= Ethiopia and the United Nations =

Federal Democratic Republic of Ethiopia

United Nations membership
- Membership: Full member
- Since: November 13, 1945
- UNSC seat: Non-permanent
- Permanent Representative: Taye Atske Selassie

Ethiopia has been a member of the United Nations since November 13, 1945. The membership stipulated to prevent from external attacks and invasions and to maintain envisaged "collective security" despite the being ineffective and the League shortcomings following Italian invasion of the country in 1935. Since 1950s, Ethiopia dispatched its first peacekeeping forces to Korea and Congo and evolved in personnels after 1990s missions some African states. Currently, Ethiopia has 80,000 peacekeeping active forces.

The UN largely covers development and humanitarian plan in Ethiopia. The UN Country Team (UNCT) composed of 28 UN funds representatives and programmes specialized agencies. Currently, Ethiopia is non- member of the UN Security Council with auspices of regional organizations like the African Union and the Intergovernmental Authority on Development (IGAD).

== History ==
After World War I, Ethiopia was one of few independent African countries when it was accepted into League of Nations on 28 September 1923, by unanimous vote at the League General Assembly. It was not colonized by European powers during the 19th century Scramble for Africa. Historians argued that Ethiopia's membership to the League was to prevent external attacks and invasions in line with covenant of the organization.

Membership to the League of Nations did not deter the Japanese invasion of Manchuria in 1931 and subsequent Italian invasion of the country, which "collective security" envisaged by the League did not meet requirement and ineffective for both protection and invasion. The failure of the League remained Ethiopia badly damaged and less reputable regarding the international organization. After liberation, in 1950s and 1960s, Ethiopia dispatched its first peacekeeping missions to Korea (to Korean War) and Congo (Congo Crisis). Since 1990s, Ethiopia has sent forces to UN operations in Rwanda, Burundi, Liberia, Cote D'Ivoire, Sudan, South Sudan and Somalia. Currently, Ethiopia has over 8,000 peacekeeping forces operating in different UN missions, becoming the largest personnel estimating around 80,000 since 1950s.

== Mandate ==
The UN is largely covers development and humanitarian assistance for Ethiopia, becoming the largest system in the world. The UN Country Team (UNCT) in Ethiopia composed of 28 UN funds representatives and programs specialized agencies.

Some of UN agencies in the UNCT have regional mandate or act as liaison office to the United Nations Commission in Africa and the African Union. The UN works to support Ethiopia with two developmental framework: Sustainable Development Goals (SDGs) and national development priorities. The UN also aimed for developing the United Nations Sustainable Development Cooperation.

On 29 November 2020, the Government of Ethiopia signed a Memorandum of Understanding on Enhanced Coordinated Mechanism for Humanitarian Access (MoU) in the Tigray Region with UN agencies. This MoU entrusts these agencies for providing humanitarian assistance to the affected population during the Tigray War.

== UN Security Council ==
Despite Ethiopia has been non-permanent member of the United Nations Security Council in the past, the country is responsible for member of global community under the auspices of the United Nations and continental and regional organizations such as the African Union and the Intergovernmental Authority on Development (IGAD).
