= Luis Alayza y Paz Soldán =

Peruvian writer and diplomat (1883–1976)

Luis Alayza y Paz Soldán (November 30, 1883 – November 15, 1976) was a Peruvian writer and diplomat who also served as a professor at National University of San Marcos, in Lima.

== Works ==
- La sed eterna
- Dau-el-kamar
- Clipper y guerra
- León Garaban
- La higuera de Pizarro
- La capa roja
- Unanue, San Martín y Bolivar
- Hipólito Unanue
- El gran mariscal José De La Mar
- La cláusula de la nación mas favorecida
- La Constitución de Cadiz de 1812
- Historia y romance del viejo Miraflores
- Las misteriosas islas del Perú
- Tahuantinsuyo
- La campaña de la Breña
- Geografia concertada del Perú
- Las Sociedades Anónimas
- Mi país, geografía e historia
