= Liechtenstein and the United Nations =

Principality of Liechtenstein

United Nations membership
- Membership: Full member
- Since: 20 September 1990
- Permanent Representative: H.E. Christian Wenaweser

The Principality of Liechtenstein is a member state of the United Nations. Liechtenstein joined the United Nations on September 18, 1990. It has never been a member of the Security Council. The Principality of Liechtenstein is a part of the Group of Western European and Other States (WEOG).

== History ==
UN membership for Liechtenstein has been questioned by the Soviet Union and its allies. In 1949 Ukrainian UN ambassador Dmitry Manuilsky argued that since Liechtenstein has entrusted Switzerland with representing it in foreign relations Liechtenstein was not sovereign enough for UN membership.

The Principality of Liechtenstein was admitted to the United Nations in 1990 by United Nations Security Council Resolution 663.

In 2022, Liechtenstein introduced a resolution requiring the permanent members of the United Nations Security Council to justify a veto.

== Permanent Representative ==
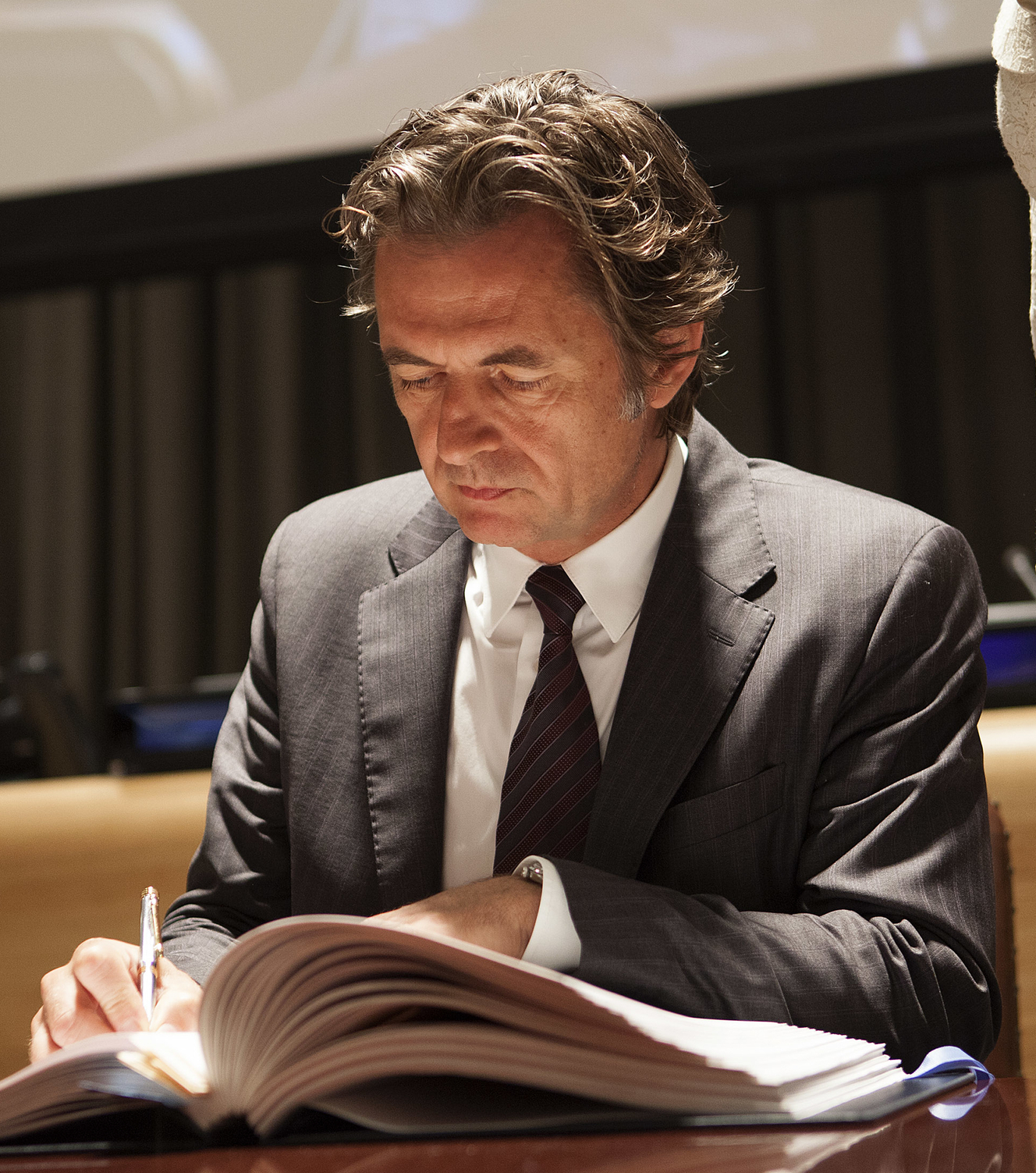
Image of Christian Wenaweser in 2013

The current Permanent Representative of Liechtenstein to the United Nations is Christian Wenaweser, during his tenure as Permanent Representative of the Principality of Liechtenstein to the United Nations he has served as:

- President of the Assembly of States Parties to the Rome Statute of the International Criminal Court
- Vice-president of the 61st session of the UN General Assembly
- Chairman of the Third Committee
- Chair of the Special Working Group on the Crime of Aggression for the Assembly of States Parties
- Chairman of the Ad hoc Committee on the Scope of Legal Protection under the 1994 Convention on the Safety of United Nations and Associated Personnel
- Vice-chair of the Open-Ended Working Group on Security Council Reform
- Adviser on Security Council Reform

Before becoming Permanent Representative of the Principality of Liechtenstein to the United Nations he served as a:

- Counselor and Deputy Permanent Representative of the Principality of Liechtenstein to the United Nations
- A Diplomatic officer in the Foreign Affairs Office in Liechtenstein

== Contributions ==
The Principality of Liechtenstein contributed 292,533 United States dollars to the United Nations in 2023.

== See also ==
- Foreign relations of Liechtenstein
- Christian Wenaweser
- United Nations Security Council Resolution 663
- United Nations General Assembly
