= Singapore and the United Nations =

Republic of Singapore

United Nations membership
- Membership: Full member
- Since: September 21, 1965
- UNSC seat: Non-permanent
- Permanent Representative: Burhanudeen Gafoor

The Republic of Singapore officially became the 117th member of the United Nations (UN) after its independence on August 9, 1965. From 2001 to 2002, Singapore held a rotational seat on the United Nations Security Council and has participated in UN peacekeeping/observer missions in Kuwait, Angola, Kenya, Cambodia and Timor Leste.

== History ==
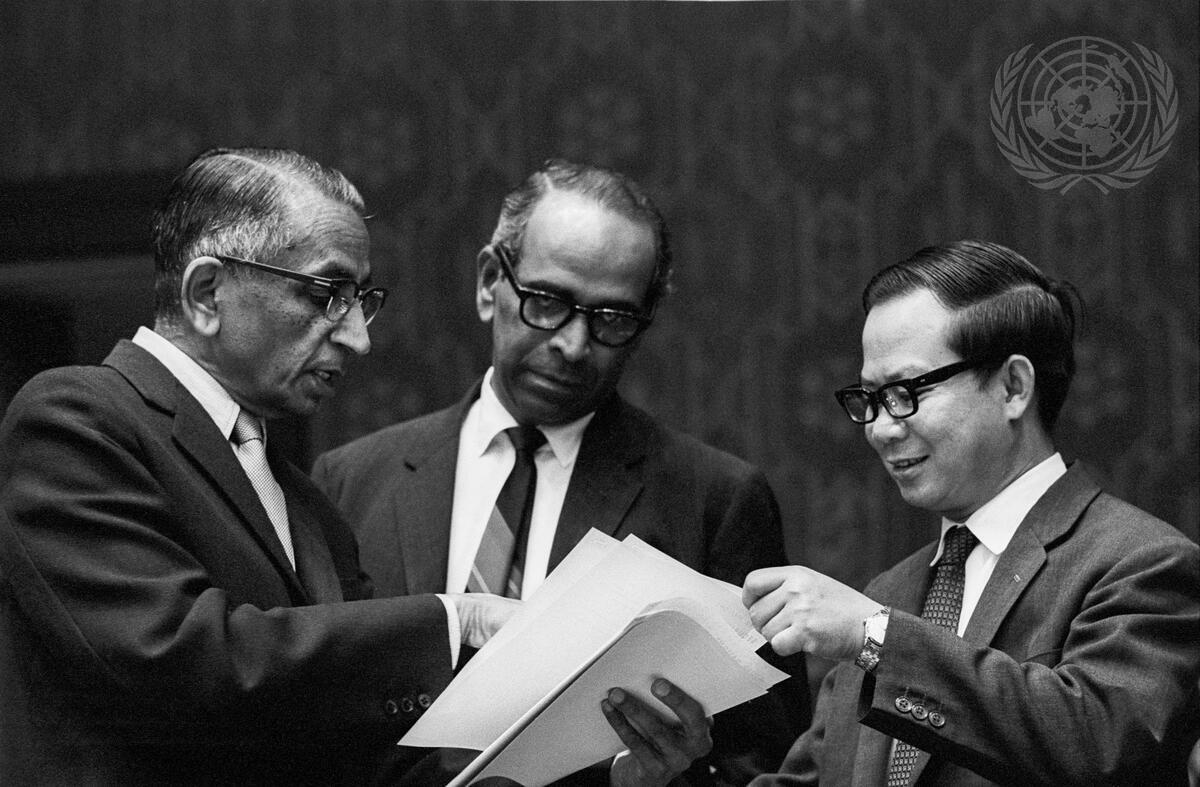
Singapore Foreign Minister S. Rajaratnam and Deputy Prime Minister Toh Chin Chye discussing documents related to Singapore’s accession to the United Nations, assisted by Radhakrishna Ramani, Permanent Representative of Malaysia to the UN.

Before independence, Singapore had merged with the Federation of Malaya with North Borneo and Sarawak to form Malaysia on August 31, 1963 and at that time, the Federation of Malaya was already a member of the UN. Due to distrust and ideological differences between leaders of the State of Singapore and the federal government of Malaysia, Singapore became an independent state about 2 years after the union, on August 9, 1965.

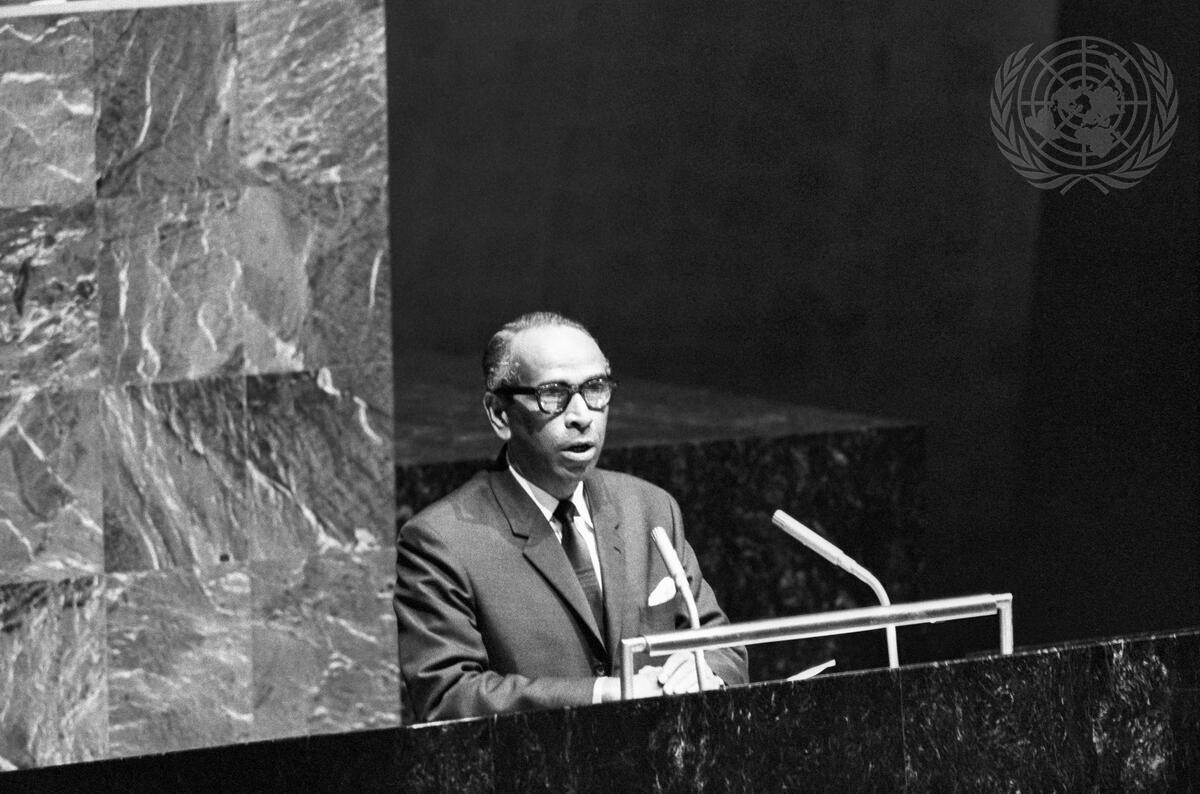
Twentieth session of United Nations General Assembly opens with S. Rajaratnam introducing Singapore to the United Nations. Singapore was a newly admitted member of the UN on 21 September 1965.

Requirements for joining the United Nations under the UN Charter of the time required sponsorship by minimum of 2 members on the United Nations Security Council, support from the members on the council and about 67% of the votes during the United Nations General Assembly to be successfully admitted into the organisation. After independence, Singapore applied to join the UN on September 2, 1965 with the sponsorship of Malaysia, the United Kingdom, Ivory Coast and Jordan. On September 20, 1965, Singapore's admission to the UN was put into vote in the security council and the result of the vote was unanimous. Singapore was then officially registered as a member of the UN on September 21, 1965, with Abu Bakar bin Pawanchee serving as the first permanent representative to the UN.

In 1969, the United Nations Association of Singapore was set up as part of the World Federation of United Nations Associations, which is part of 'The Third United Nations'.

Since then, Singapore has been actively participating in UN peacekeeping operations. In 1997, the country became only the seventh country to sign the Memorandum of Understanding on UN Standby Arrangements.

== Activities ==
=== Security Council ===
During the 2000 United Nations Security Council election, Singapore was elected as one of the five non-permanent members of the UN Security Council and served a two-year term from 2001 to 2002. In January 2001 and May 2002, Ambassador Kishore Mahbubani, the permanent representative of Singapore then, served as the President of the United Nations Security Council together with Ambassador S. Jayakumar. During Singapore's time on the security council, it managed to lobbied for a time extension for the United Nations Transitional Administration in East Timor until East Timor's independence, despite objection from a permanent member on the council.

=== Peacekeeping and observer missions ===
Since 1989, Singapore has taken part in 17 peacekeeping and observer missions with personnel from the Singapore Armed Forces (SAF) and Singapore Police Force (SPF). Singapore's first peacekeeping mission was to oversee Namibia’s transition to independence, was in response to an urgent call for help from then UN Secretary-General Javier Perez de Cuellar on March 29, 1989. A total of 30 personnel from the SPF was sent on the mission and the country also contributed S$172,652 to the operations of the United Nations Transition Assistance Group.

Singapore has taken part in the following peacekeeping and observer missions led by the UN.

Start Year	End Year	Country	Conflict	Mission	No. of personnel
1989	2000	Namibia	Namibia’s Transition to Independence	UNTAG	30 (Singapore Police Force)
1991	2003	Kuwait	Gulf War	UNIKOM	88 (Singapore Armed Forces)
1993	1993	Cambodia	Cambodian–Vietnamese War	UNTAC	65 (Singapore Armed Forces)
1994	1994	South Africa	Internal resistance to apartheid	UNOMSA	—N/a
1997	1998	Afghanistan	Afghanistan conflict	UNSMA	1 military advisor (Singapore Armed Forces)
1999	2000	Timor-Leste	Indonesian occupation of East Timor	INTERFET	None
2000	2002	Timor-Leste	Indonesian occupation of East Timor	UNTAET	1,000 (Singapore Armed Forces & Singapore Police Force)
2002	2005	Timor-Leste	Indonesian occupation of East Timor	UNMISET	1,000 (Singapore Armed Forces & Singapore Police Force)
2000	2003	Ethiopia	Eritrean–Ethiopian War	UNMEE	1 military advisor (Singapore Armed Forces)
2000	2003	Eritrea	Eritrean–Ethiopian War	UNMEE	1 military advisor (Singapore Armed Forces)

=== Notification of Casualties application ===
In December 2015, a memorandum of understanding was signed between Singapore and the United Nations to develop an information management tool to aid in peacekeeping operations. The main functionality of the software is to allow the reporting of casualty for personnel serving in peacekeeping operations, which will be then accessed by authorized users in the UN Headquarters in New York, and all Peacekeeping and Special Political Missions. The tool was developed by the Singapore Armed Forces (SAF), the UN Department of Peacekeeping Operations (UN DPKO) and the UN Department of Field Support (UN DFS) and was launched in May 2017. The launch of the software was officiated by Jean-Pierre Lacroix, the United Nations Under-Secretary-General for Peace Operations in a ceremony in New York.

== Representation ==
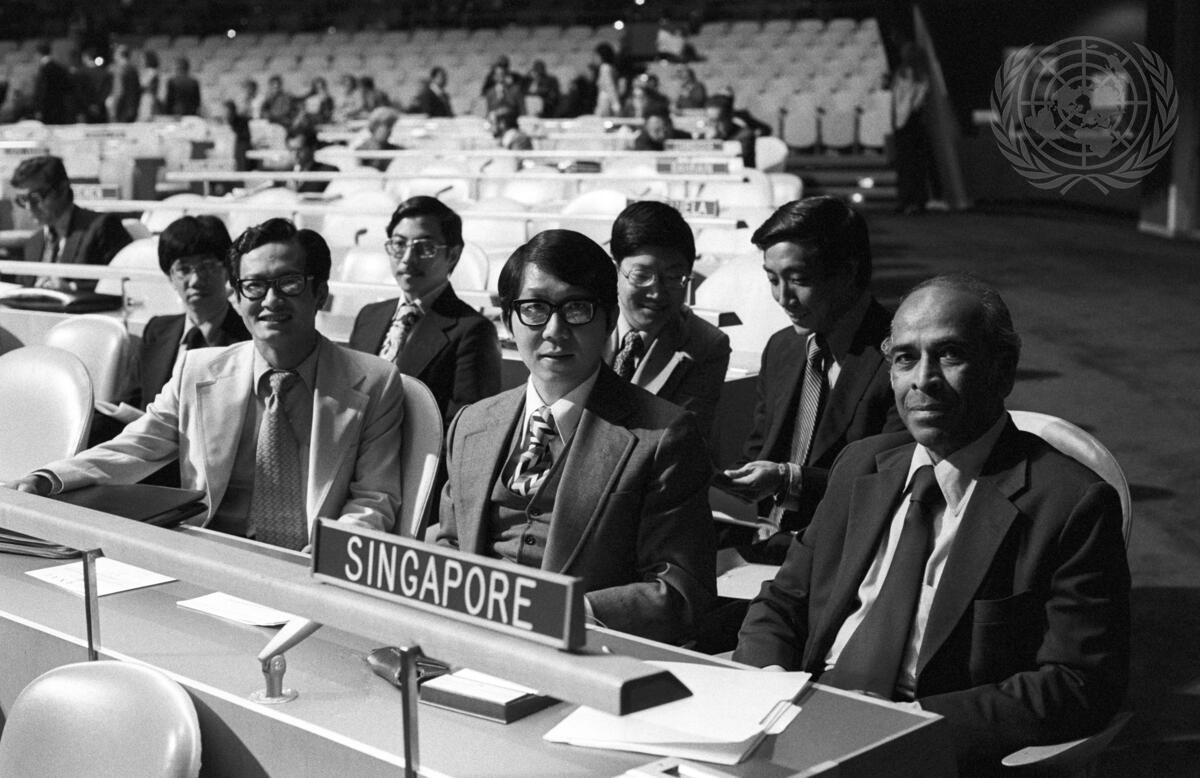
Singapore’s United Nations delegation roster, 24 September 1975. Permanent Representative Tommy Koh is at center, with Foreign Minister S. Rajaratnam seated to his right.

Singapore maintains 3 permanent missions to the UN and 1 permanent delegate to UNESCO. The 3 permanent missions to the UN are located in New York, which is headed by Ambassador Burhan Gafoor, Geneva, which is headed by Ambassador Tan Hung Seng and lastly at Vienna, which is headed by Ambassador Umej Singh Bhatia. The permanent mission in Vienna, also serves as the country's representative to the Comprehensive Nuclear-Test-Ban Treaty Organization and the International Atomic Energy Agency. The non-resident permanent delegate to UNESCO is represented by Ambassador Rosa Huey Daniel.

== See also ==
- Foreign relations of Singapore
