= Costa Rica and the United Nations =

Costa Rica became a member of the United Nations on November 2, 1945.

== Delegations to the UN ==
=== 1946 Delegation ===
In this first assembly, the Costa Rican Ambassador made not comments on the general themes of the discussion.

Chief of the Delegation: Fernando Soto Harrison

=== 1947 Delegation ===
The Costa Rican delegation did not dance any general themes of discussion, and the General Assembly was focused on its future organization.

Delegates: Ricardo Fournier, Francisco de Paula Gutierrez, Arturo Morales Flores, Fernando Flores B., Miguel A. Blanco

=== 1948 Delegation ===
The Costa Rican delegation did not any general themes of discussion, but they did remark on several aspects of the agenda. The most important points of discussion were the Palestine situation, problems with the Greek border, the situation in the Balkans, a temporary committee on the elections in South Korea, and the problem between Pakistan and India.

Delegates: Gonzalo Facio, Alberto Canas, Alfonso Goicoechea, Edmond Woodbridge, Alberto Lorenzo, Carlos Manuel Gutierrez, Gonzalo Ortiz Martin and Miguel Bourla

=== 1949 Delegation ===
The major themes of this General Assembly were the crisis in the Middle East, the dispute between Pakistan and India, the necessity of establishing technical programs for countries in need, and the problems between Great Britain and Greece.

Delegates: Alfredo Volio Mata, Jorge Martinez Moreno, Fernando Pinto Echeverria, Romano Orlich, Graciela Morales de Echeverria

=== 1950 Delegation ===
Delegates: Mario Echandi Jimenez, Luis Fernando Jimenez Mendez, Fernando Fournier Acuna, Manuel Freer Jimenez, Ruben Esquivel de la Guardia, Felix Roberto Cortes Noriega

=== 1951 Delegation ===
Delegates: Alfredo Volio Mata, Fernando Pinto Echeverria

=== 1952 Delegation ===
Delegates: Alfredo Volio Mata, Christian de Tattenbach, Fernando Hine, Gonzalo Facio, Fabio Fournier, Ruben Esquivel de la Guardia, and Mario Golcher

=== 1953 Delegation ===
Delegates: Eladio Trejos Flores, C. Tattenbach, Carlos Jose Gutierrez, Ricardo Fernandez Palma, Ruben Esquivel de la Guardia, Manuel Fernandez, Roberto Fernandez Zuniga, Raul Trejos Flores, Efrain Alfaro, and Maria Lilia Favio

=== 1954 Delegation ===
Delegates: Fernando Fournier, Benjamin Nunez, Elsa Orozco, Rodrigo Madrigal, Rafael Carrillo, Alberto Canas, Raul Trejos Flores, Jose F. Carvallo, Maria Lilia Montejo, Luis F. Jimenez

=== 1955 Delegation ===
Delegates: Alfredo Volio Mata, Gonzalo Facio, Cristian de Tattenbach, Fernando Fournier, Maria Eugenia Vargas Solera, Roberto Fernandez Duran, Benjamin Nunez, Rodrigo Sotela Montagne, Oscar Chavez Esquivel, Roberto Loria Cortes, Francisco Carvallo Quiros, Rufino Gil and Raul Trejos Flores

=== 1956 Delegation ===
Delegates: Raul Trejos Flores, Carlos Jose Gutierrez, Canas Escalante, Cristian de Tattenbach, G.J. Facio, and Roberto Fernandez

=== 1957 Delegation ===
Ambassador Fournier proposed in this session that the UN define the concept of aggression.

Delegates: Fournier Acuna, Canas Escalante, Nunez Vargas, Trejos Flores, Carrillo, Elsa Orozco, and Madrigal Nieto

=== 1958 Delegation ===
In this assembly, Costa Rica declared itself against the death penalty.

Delegates: Gonzalo Ortiz Martin, Raul Trejos Flores, Alfredo Vargas Fernandez, Hernan Zamora, Guido Fernandez, Eladio Trejos Flores, Manuel E. Rodriguez, Emilia Castro-Barish, and Ramiro Brenes Gutierrez

=== 1959 Delegation ===
Delegates: Alfredo Vargas Fernandez, Gonzalo Ortiz Martin, Enrique Guier Saenz, Gonzalo Salazar Herrera, Raul Trejos Flores, Enrique Oller Zamora, Guido Sanchez Fernandez, Ramiro Brenes Gutierrez, Oscar Chavarria Pol, E. Castro de Barish

=== 1960 Delegation ===
Delegates: Alfredo Vargas Fernandez, Gonzalo Ortiz Martin, Estela Quesada, Alfredo Fernandez Iglesias, Jose Francisco Benavides Robles, Javier Oreamuno, Raul Selva Herra, Rafael Iglesias Alvarez, E. Castro de Barish, Margarita de Macaya

=== 1961 Delegation ===
Delegates: Gonzalo Ortiz Martin, Javier Oreamuno, Guillermo Valverde, Isabel de Ortiz Martin, E. Castro de Barish, Oscar Chavarria Pol, Alberto Pinto, Fabio Sanchez Castillo

=== 1962 Delegation ===
Delegates: Daniel Oduber Quiros, Mario Gomez, Fernando Volio, Jose Luis Redondo, Rodolfo Lara Iraeta, Javier Oreamuno, Hernan Gonzalez Gutierrez, E. Castro de Barish, Luis F. Jimenez Mendez, Alonso Lara Thomas, Humberto Nigro Borbon

=== 1963 Delegation ===
Delegates: E. Castro de Barish, Hernan Gonzalez Gutierrez, Lara Iraeta, Oduber Quiros, Javier Oreamuno, J.L. Redondo, Volio Jimenez

=== 1964 Delegation ===
Delegates: Volio Jimenez, Castro Hernandez, Rev. F. Herrera, Oduber Quiros, Cristian Tattembach, J.L. Redondo, Pol-Vargas

=== 1965 Delegation ===
Delegates: Oduber Quiros, Volio Jimenez, Castro Barish, Mario Gomez Calvo, JL Redondo, Rafael Benavides, Mercedes Valverde, Rev. Francisco Herrera, Raul Hess, R. Castro Silva, Julio Corvetti

=== 1966 Delegation ===
Delegates: Castro Barish, Castro Silva, Gomez Calvo, Redondo, J.M. Aguirre, Herrera Mora, Montero Mora, J.J. Sobrado, Valverde Cooper

=== 1967 Delegation ===
Delegates: Lara Bustamante, L.D. Tinoco, Castro de Barish, E. Jimenez

=== 1968 Delegation ===
Delegates: Lara Bustamante, L.D. Tinoco, D. Chaverri, E. Jimenez, Castro de Barish

=== 1969 Delegation ===
Delegates: Dobles Sanchez, Castro de Barish, E. Iglesias, Neil Neil, G. Serrano

=== 1970 Delegation ===
Delegates: Gonzalo Facio, Luis Molina, Daniel Oduber, Guillermo Jimenez Ramirez, Jesus Fernandez Morales, E. Castro de Barish, Luis Castro Hernandez, Miguel Yamuni, Luis Bonilla, Manuel Emilio Montero y Jose Vega

=== 1971 Delegation ===
Delegates: Jose Figueres, JL Molina, G. Facio, Castro de Barish, Castro-Hernandez, L. Bonilla

=== 1972 Delegation ===
Delegates: G. Facio, Castro de Barish, Nunez Vargas, JL Molina, R. Carreras, R. Morales, E. Fonseca, G. Trejos, A. Montiel

=== 1973 Delegation ===
Delegates: G. Facio, Castro de Barish, J.L. Molina, R. Morales, R. Paris Steffens, J.L. Redondo, F. Salazar, L.A. Varela, Benjamin Vargas

=== 1974 Delegation ===
Delegates: G. Facio, Castro de Barish, Salazar Navarrete, L. Varela, B. Vargas, Freer Jimenez, F. Monge, V.H. Roman and F. del Castillo

=== 1975 Delegation ===
Costa Rica was elected the executive director of the UN Special Fund.

Delegates: G. Facio, Castro de Barish, Nunez Vargas, M. Morales, F. Salazar Navarrete, Vargas Saborio

=== 1976 Delegation ===
In this session, Ambassador Saborio was elected into the Contributions Committee. The themes treated by the Costa Rican delegates were: the violation of human rights in Chile, the problem of occupied Arab territories, the activities of the International Rights, the problem with the Panama Canal, general aspects of the Commission on Human Rights, the establishment of the Human Rights Council, and perspectives on the Global Convention on Racism and Racial Discrimination.

Delegates: G.J. Facio, E. Castro Barish, JL Redondo, JJ Chaverri, F. Salazar, Vargas Saborio, R. Ortega, President Daniel Oduber (Secretary-General of the General Assembly)

=== 1977 Delegation ===
Delegates: Castro de Barish, M. Freer, V. Hernandez, Nazareth Incera, F. Fournier, M. Herrera, J.L. Redondo, Varela Quiros, Vargas Chacon, Ortiz Martin

=== 1978 Delegation ===
Costa Rica was elected as the vice-president of the General Assembly, and was also elected to the Committee on Programming and Coordination. Ambassador Piza was elected into the Special Political Committee. During this time, the president Rodrigo Carazo Odio addressed the General Assembly in its 11th session.

Delegates: Calderon Fournier, Piza Escalante, A. Antillon Salazar, Castro de Barish, J.L. Redondo, G. Ortiz Martin, A. Pinto, F. Fournier, Varela Quiros, L.D. Tinoco Castro, Vargas Chacon, E. Zeledon de Carazo

=== 1979 Delegation ===
In this session, the Ambassador R. Piza was unanimously elected the president of the Credentials Committee, and Orietta Moya de Fraenkel was elected acting chairman of the same committee.

Delegates: Calderon Fournier, Piza Escalante, Niehaus Quesada, Castro de Barish

=== 1980 Delegation ===
Costa Rica is again nominated as the vice-president of the General Assembly, and Ambassador Piza Escalante continued to occupy the presidency of the Credentials Committee. In addition, delegate Esquival Tovar is nominated as vice-president of the Third Committee: Social, Humanitarian, and Cultural Affairs. President Rodrigo Carazo Odio addressed the Assembly.

Delegates: Piza Escalante, Niehaus Quesada, J.M. Alfaro, V. Perez, N. Incera, R. Daher, Castro de Barish, Esquivel Tovar, A.C. Hidalgo, Varela Quiros

=== 1981 Delegation ===
Delegates: B. Niehaus, Castro de Barish, N. Incera, Echeverria Villafranca

=== 1982 Delegation ===
Costa Rica was elected to be part of the Social and Economic Committee (ECOSOC).

Delegates: Volio Jimenez, J. Urbina, F. Zumbado, J. Munoz Mora, Castro de Barish

=== 1983 Delegation ===
Delegates: C.J. Gutierrez, F. Zumbado, Castro de Barish, F. Salazar, J. Urbina, Ines Trejos

=== 1984 Delegation ===
In this session, Costa Rica and other Central American countries proposed a plan of economic recuperation for the region.

Delegates: F. Zumbado, Castro de Barish, C.J. Gutierrez, F. Salazar, N. Jorge Urbina, Ines Trejos

=== 1985 Delegation ===
Costa Rica was elected vice-president of the General Assembly.

Delegates: F. Berrocal Soto, Castro de Barish, C.J. Gutierrez, Munoz Mora, N. Incera, J. Saenz C.

=== 1986 Delegation ===
President Oscar Arias Sanchez addressed the General Assembly on the human rights situation in Central America.

Delegates: C.J. Gutierrez, Castro de Barish, A.J. Ortuno

=== 1987 Delegation ===
President Arias addressed the General Assembly, again referring to the human rights situation in Central America.

Delegates: C.J. Gutierrez, Castro de Barish, N. Incera

=== 1988 Delegation ===
In this session, Ambassador Segura was elected as the Chief of the Costa Rican Delegation.

Delegates: Madrigal Nieto, Rivera Bianchini, CJ Gutierrez, Castro de Barish, A. Chacon, V. Garron de Doryan, M. Castro Laurencich, I. Hermmann

=== 1989 Delegation ===
In this session, Costa Rican President Arias was chosen to speak about the accomplishments of Central American countries.

Delegates: Madrigal Nieto, Rivera Bianchini, N. Morales, I. Hermann, C.J. Gutierrez, Castro de Barish, A. Chacon, N. Incera

=== 1990 Delegation ===
In this session, President Calderon attended the World Summit of Heads of State and Government to ratify the Convention on the Rights of the Child.

Delegates: Niehaus Quesada, E. Odio Benito, Castro de Barish, Piza Rocafort, C. Tattenbach, Vargas de Zardoff, N. Incer, J.M. Borbon

=== 1991 Delegation ===
Delegates: Niehaus Quesada, E. Odio Benito, Castro de Barish, Piza Rocafort, C. Tattenbach, Vargas de Zardoff, N. Incer, J.M. Borbon, N. Morales

=== 1992 Delegation ===
Delegates: Niehaus Quesada, C. Tattembach, Castro de Barish, A.M. Rivera, J.M. Borbon

=== 1993 Delegation ===
Delegates: Niehaus Quesada, Castro de Barish, C. Tattenbach, N. Incera, A.M. Rivera, M. Peralta, Vargas de Jesus

=== 1994 Delegation ===
Delegates: F. Naranjo, Castro de Barish, F. Berrocal, S. Picado, V. Monge, L.G. Solis, R. Carreras, J. Rossi

=== 1995 Delegation ===
Delegates: F. Naranjo, R. Carreras, F. Berrocal, E. Castro de Barish, M. Saenz, L.G. Solis

== Membership in the Commission on Human Rights ==
Costa Rica was a member state of the Commission on Human Rights from 1964–67, 1975–77, 1980–88, 1992–94, 2001-2006.
