= Sweden and the United Nations =

Kingdom of Sweden

United Nations membership
- Membership: Full member
- Since: 19 November 1946
- UNSC seat: Non-permanent
- Permanent Representative: Nicola Clase

Sweden became a member of the United Nations on November 19, 1946. Sweden has historically contributed with political leadership; politicians and diplomats such as Dag Hammarskjöld, Folke Bernadotte, Alva Myrdal and Margot Wallström and others have all played important roles in the development of the UN organization. Sweden is one of few member nations which meets or exceeds United Nations humanitarian aid spending target of 0.7% of GDP. In 2017, Swedish aid spending amounted to 1.4% of its GDP. The country has held a non-permanent seat in the Security Council four times, most recently between 2017 and 2018.

== History ==
Sweden joined the United Nations in 1946 and participated alongside other early member nations in the adoption of the UN Universal Declaration of Human Rights on 10 December 1948.

Swedish diplomat Folke Bernadotte was unanimously appointed "United Nations Mediator in Palestine" for the Security Council in the Arab-Israeli conflict between 1947 and 1948. The first official mediator in UN history, Bernadotte achieved an initial truce during the subsequent 1948 Arab-Israeli War and laid the foundation for the United Nations Relief and Works Agency for Palestine Refugees in the Near East. His participation in mediation talks was criticized by the Israeli government for stating that the Arab nations were reluctant to resume fighting in Palestine and that the conflict now consisted of "incidents". Bernadotte was assassinated on 17 September 1948 by members of Lehi, a militant Jewish Zionist group.

On 7 April 1953, Chairman of the Swedish delegation to the General Assembly Dag Hammarskjöld was appointed Secretary-General of the United Nations, succeeding the first Secretary-General, Trygve Lie. Hammarskjöld was sworn in on 10 April and he was unanimously reelected for a second term on 26 September 1957. On 18 September 1961, while en route to negotiate a cease fire between UN forces and Moise Tshombe's Katangese troops in Congo, Hammarskjöld's Douglas DC-6 airliner crashed with no survivors in Northern Rhodesia. The death of the Secretary-General sparked a succession crisis within the UN, as there was no line of succession in place and the Security Council had to vote on a successor.

== Membership in the Security Council ==
Sweden has held a non-permanent seat in the United Nations Security Council four times since its entry in 1946, roughly once every 20 years:

- 1957–1958
- 1975–1976
- 1997–1998
- 2017–2018
