= Gaetano Morelli =

Gaetano Morelli (Crotone, 23 May 1900 - Rome, 22 May 1989) was an Italian jurist and magistrate, judge of the International Court of Justice in The Hague from 1961 to 1970. He embraced positivism as his legal philosophy.

He obtained his doctorate in law in 1921 from the University of Rome under the supervision of Dionisio Anzilotti and later worked as a professor at the universities of Modena, Padua, Naples and, starting in 1951, Rome. He taught twice as a lecturer at the Hague Academy of International Law. In 1961, he was appointed a judge of the International Court of Justice, where he served until 1970. He had previously served as a judge ad hoc.

== Bibliography ==
- Kunz, Josef L. "Nozioni di Diritto Internazionale. By Gaetano Morelli. Padua: CEDAM, 1947 Pp. 215. $2.00." American Journal of International Law 42.4 (1948): 960-961.
- Gaetano Morelli. In: Arthur Eyffinger, Arthur Witteveen, Mohammed Bedjaoui, The International Court of Justice 1946–1996. Martinus Nijhoff Publishers, The Hague and London 1999, ISBN 9-04-110468-2, p. 307.
