= 2019 Delta State House of Assembly election =

Nigerian State election

The 2019 Delta State House of Assembly election was held on March 9, 2019, to elect members of the Delta State House of Assembly in Nigeria. All the 29 seats were up for election in the Delta State House of Assembly.

Sheriff Oborevwori from PDP representing Okpe constituency was elected Speaker, while Ochor Christopher Ochor from PDP representing Ukwuani North constituency was elected Deputy Speaker.

== Results ==
The result of the election is listed below.

- Sheriff Oborevwori from PDP won Okpe constituency
- Kenneth Ogba from PDP won Isoko South I constituency
- Ferguson Onwo from PDP won Isoko South II constituency
- Tim Owhefere from PDP won Isoko North constituency
- Friday Osanebi from PDP won Ndokwa East constituency
- Charles Emetulu from PDP won Ndokwa West constituency
- Rueben Izeze from PDP won Ughelli South constituency
- Pat Ajudua from PDP won Oshimili North constituency
- Shedrack Rapu from PDP won Oshimili South constituency
- Festus Okoh from PDP won Ika South constituency
- Anthony Elekeokwuri from PDP won Ika North East constituency
- Emmanuel Sinebe from PDP won Patani constituency
- Solomon Ighrakpata from PDP won Uvwie constituency
- Peter Uviejitobor from PDP won Udu constituency
- Felix Anirah from PDP won Sapele constituency
- Emeke Nwaobi from PDP won Aniocha North constituency
- Austin Chikezie from PDP won Aniocha South constituency
- Oboro Preyor from PDP won Bomadi constituency
- Asupa Forteta from PDP won Burutu I constituency
- Pullah Ekpotuayerin from PDP won Burutu II constituency
- Anidi Innocent from APC won Ethiope East constituency
- Erhiatake Ibori-Suonu from PDP won Ethiope West constituency
- Oniyere Charles from APC won Ughelli North I constituency
- jaro egbo from APC won Ughelli North II constituency
- Emomotimi Guwor from PDP won Warri South West constituency
- Alfred Martins from PDP won Warri North constituency
- Augustine Uroye from PDP won Warri South I constituency
- Matthew Opuoru from PDP won Warri South II constituency
- Ochor Christopher Ochor from PDP won Ukwuani constituency
