= 2017 International Court of Justice judges election =

The 2017 International Court of Justice election took place from 9 to 20 November 2017 at the United Nations Headquarters in New York City. In the set of triennial elections, the General Assembly and the Security Council concurrently elect five judges to the Court for nine-year terms, in this case beginning on 6 February 2018. From the seven candidates, the five winners were Abdulqawi Yusuf (Somalia), Antônio Augusto Cançado Trindade (Brazil), Nawaf Salam (Lebanon), Ronny Abraham (France) and Dalveer Bhandari (India).

== Background ==
The International Court of Justice (ICJ), based in The Hague, is one of the principal organs of the United Nations. Also known as the World Court, it adjudicates legal disputes between states, and provides advisory opinions on legal questions submitted by other UN organs or agencies.

The court consists of 15 judges, with five judges elected every three years. (In the case of death or other vacancy, a judge is elected for the remainder of the term.) Judges are required to be independent and impartial; they may not exercise any political or administrative function, and do not act as a representative of their home state.

Elections of members of the Court are governed by articles 2 through 15 of the Statute of the International Court of Justice.

Prior to the election, the composition of the Court was as follows:

Judge	Term starts / renewed	Term ends
(France) Ronny Abraham, President	2005, 2009	2018
(Somalia) Abdulqawi Yusuf, Vice-President	2009	2018
(United Kingdom) Christopher Greenwood	2009	2018
(India) Dalveer Bhandari	2012	2018
(Brazil) Antônio Augusto Cançado Trindade	2009	2018
(Slovakia) Peter Tomka	2003, 2012	2021
(Japan) Hisashi Owada	2003, 2012	2021
(China) Xue Hanqin	2010, 2012	2021
(Uganda) Julia Sebutinde	2012	2021
(Italy) Giorgio Gaja	2012	2021
(Morocco) Mohamed Bennouna	2006, 2015	2024
(United States) Joan Donoghue	2010, 2015	2024
(Jamaica) Patrick Lipton Robinson	2015	2024
(Russia) Kirill Gevorgian	2015	2024
(Australia) James Crawford	2015	2024

Unusually, all the five judges whose term was to expire were candidates for re-election.

== Candidates ==
=== Qualifications ===
Article 2 of the Statute of the ICJ provides that judges shall be elected “from among persons of high moral character, who possess the qualifications required in their respective countries for appointment to the highest judicial offices, or are jurisconsults of recognized competence in international law”.

=== Nomination procedure ===
Nominations of candidates for election to the ICJ are made by individuals who sit on the Permanent Court of Arbitration (PCA). For this purpose, members of the PCA act in "national groups" (i.e. all the PCA members from any individual country). (In the case of UN member states not represented in the PCA, the state in question may select up to four individuals to be its "national group" for the purpose of nominating candidates to the ICJ.)

Every such "national group" may nominate up to four candidates, not more than two of whom shall be of their own nationality. Before making these nominations, each "national group" is recommended to consult its highest court of justice, its legal faculties and schools of law, and its national academies and national sections of international academies devoted to the study of law.

=== 2017 nominees ===
By a communication dated 1 February 2017, the Secretary-General of the United Nations invited the "national groups" to undertake the nomination of persons as judges of the ICJ, and submit the nominations no later than 3 July 2017.

The nominated candidates for the 2017 election (grouped according to the informal distribution of seats among United Nations Regional Groups) were as follows:

Regional group	Vacancy	Candidate	Nominating national groups
Africa	(Somalia) Abdulqawi Yusuf	(Zambia) Chaloka Beyani	Zambia
Africa	(Somalia) Abdulqawi Yusuf	(Somalia) Abdulqawi Yusuf	Australia, Bolivia (Plurinational State of), China, Colombia, Costa Rica, Denmark, Finland, France, Hungary, Italy, Liechtenstein, Malta, Mexico, Netherlands, New Zealand, Nigeria, Norway, Somalia, Spain, Sweden, Switzerland, United Kingdom
Asia-Pacific	(India) Dalveer Bhandari	(India) Dalveer Bhandari	Australia, Bangladesh, Colombia, India, Israel
Asia-Pacific	(India) Dalveer Bhandari	(Lebanon) Nawaf Salam	France, Lebanon
GRULAC	(Brazil) Antônio Augusto Cançado Trindade	(Brazil) Antônio Augusto Cançado Trindade	Argentina, Bolivia (Plurinational State of), Brazil, China, Colombia, Costa Rica, Finland, Greece, Hungary, Liechtenstein, Mexico, Netherlands, Portugal, Spain, Sweden
WEOG	(France) Ronny Abraham	(France) Ronny Abraham	Australia, Austria, Bolivia (Plurinational State of), Costa Rica, Denmark, Finland, France, Germany, Greece, Hungary, Liechtenstein, Malta, Mexico, Morocco, Netherlands, Norway, Poland, Portugal, Romania, Russian Federation, Slovakia, Spain, Sweden, United Kingdom
WEOG	(United Kingdom) Christopher Greenwood	(United Kingdom) Christopher Greenwood	Australia, Austra, Bolivia (Plurinational State of), China, Denmark, Finland, France, Greece, Hungary, Liechtenstein, Mexico, Netherlands, New Zealand, Norway, Singapore, Slovakia, Sweden, United Kingdom, United States

== Election procedure ==
The General Assembly and the Security Council proceed, independently of one another, to elect five members of the Court.

To be elected, a candidate must obtain an absolute majority of votes both in the General Assembly and in the Security Council. The words “absolute majority” are interpreted as meaning a majority of all electors, whether or not they vote or are allowed to vote. Thus 97 votes constitute an absolute majority in the General Assembly and 8 votes constitute an absolute majority in the Security Council (with no distinction being made between permanent and non-permanent members of the Security Council).

Only those candidates whose names appear on the ballot papers are eligible for election. Each elector in the General Assembly and in the Security Council may vote for not more than five candidates on the first ballot and, on subsequent ballots for five less the number of candidates who have already obtained an absolute majority.

When five candidates have obtained the required majority in one of the organs, the president of that organ notifies the president of the other organ of the names of the five candidates. The president of the latter does not communicate such names to the members of that organ until that organ itself has given five candidates the required majority of votes.

After both the General Assembly and the Security Council have produced a list of five names that received an absolute majority of the votes, the two lists are compared. Any candidate appearing on both lists is elected. But if fewer than five candidates have been thus elected (as happened in 2017), the two organs proceed, again independently of one another, at a second meeting and, if necessary, a third meeting to elect candidates by further ballots for seats remaining vacant, the results again being compared after the required number of candidates have obtained an absolute majority in each organ.

If after the third meeting, one or more seats still remain unfilled, the General Assembly and the Security Council may form a joint conference consisting of six members, three appointed by each organ. This joint conference may, by an absolute majority, agree upon one name for each seat still vacant and submit the name for the respective acceptance of the General Assembly and the Security Council. If the joint conference is unanimously agreed, it may submit the name of a person not included in the list of nominations, provided that candidate fulfills the required conditions of eligibility to be a judge on the ICJ.

If the General Assembly and the Security Council ultimately are unable to fill one or more vacant seats, then the judges of the ICJ who have already been elected shall proceed to fill the vacant seats by selection from among those candidates who have obtained votes either in the General Assembly or in the Security Council. In the event of a tie vote among the judges, the eldest judge shall have a casting vote.

== Election ==
=== Day 1: meeting 1 ===
The first meeting in order to elect judges of the Court was held simultaneously at the General Assembly and the Security Council on 9 November 2017. The Zambian delegation withdrew the candidacy of Chaloka Beyani prior to the first round of voting.

Candidate	General Assembly majority = 97					Security Council majority = 8			
Candidate	R1	R2	R3	R4	R5	R1	R2	R3	R4
(France) Ronny Abraham	165	159	144	137	139	15	15	15	15
(Brazil) Antônio Augusto Cançado Trindade	153	150	131	131	127	11	11	8	10
(India) Dalveer Bhandari	149	141	120	121	118	11	10	9	7
(Lebanon) Nawaf Salam	148	150	136	136	135	11	11	10	12
(United Kingdom) Christopher Greenwood	147	137	109	102	96	14	13	13	12
(Somalia) Abdulqawi Yusuf	144	141	141	136	135	12	12	11	10

During the first three rounds of balloting at the Security Council and the first four rounds of balloting at the General Assembly, all six candidates received an absolute majority of votes. Therefore, each body proceeded to further rounds of balloting until only five candidates received majority support.

After each body chose five candidates, the lists were compared, resulting in Ronny Abraham, Antônio Augusto Cançado Trindade, Abdulqawi Ahmed Yusuf and Nawaf Salam being elected to the Court after receiving majority support in both bodies. The General Assembly and Security Council then proceeded to another meeting in order to fill the fifth vacant seat, choosing between Dalveer Bhandari and Christopher Greenwood.

=== Day 1: meeting 2 ===
After the first meeting was inconclusive, the Council and the Assembly convened a second meeting on the same day.

Candidate	GA	SC
(India) Dalveer Bhandari	115	6
(United Kingdom) Christopher Greenwood	76	9

No candidate received the required absolute majorities in both bodies.

=== Day 2: meetings 3 to 7 ===
After several rounds of voting on 9 November 2017 left one seat vacant, the General Assembly and the Security Council reconvened in order to fill that remaining vacancy, on 13 November 2017. Several rounds of voting were held, each one technically constituting a separate meeting of each body. In all rounds of voting Dalveer Bhandari received the majority of votes in the General Assembly and Christopher Greenwood received the majority of votes in the Security Council (note that the total number of votes at the Security Council was 14 rather than 15, as one of the members abstained at every round of voting). After the first round of voting on 13 November, technically the 3rd meeting of these elections, the statutory possibility emerged to convene a joint conference of representatives of the Assembly and the Council; however, no delegation raised the matter during the third or any subsequent meeting.

Candidate	Meeting 3		Meeting 4		Meeting 5		Meeting 6		Meeting 7	
Candidate	GA	SC	GA	SC	GA	SC	GA	SC	GA	SC
(India) Dalveer Bhandari	110	5	113	5	111	5	118	5	121	5
(United Kingdom) Christopher Greenwood	79	9	76	9	79	9	72	9	68	9

=== Day 3: meeting 8 ===
After several inconclusive rounds of voting on 13 November 2017, the Assembly and the Council postponed the procedure. They reconvened in order to fill the remaining vacant seat at the Court on 20 November 2017. Prior to the meeting the UK withdrew the candidacy of Christopher Greenwood. Dalveer Bhandari was elected to the last vacant seat.

Candidate	Meeting 8	
Candidate	GA	SC
(India) Dalveer Bhandari	183	15

== Aftermath ==
After the election, the composition of the Court was as follows:

Judge	Term starts / renewed	Term ends
(Slovakia) Peter Tomka	2003, 2012	2021
(Japan) Hisashi Owada	2003, 2012	2021
(China) Xue Hanqin	2010, 2012	2021
(Uganda) Julia Sebutinde	2012	2021
(Italy) Giorgio Gaja	2012	2021
(Morocco) Mohamed Bennouna	2006, 2015	2024
(United States) Joan Donoghue	2010, 2015	2024
(Jamaica) Patrick Lipton Robinson	2015	2024
(Russia) Kirill Gevorgian	2015	2024
(Australia) James Crawford	2015	2024
(France) Ronny Abraham	2005, 2009, 2018	2027
(Somalia) Abdulqawi Yusuf	2009, 2018	2027
(Lebanon) Nawaf Salam	2018	2027
(India) Dalveer Bhandari	2012, 2018	2027
(Brazil) Antônio Augusto Cançado Trindade	2009, 2018	2027

Christopher Greenwood's defeat marked the first time the United Kingdom would not have a judge at the International Court of Justice, the first time a permanent member of the United Nations Security Council would not have a judge at the Court and the first time a sitting member of the court lost to another sitting member. Bhandari's election also upset the tradition of five seats being occupied by the Western European and Others Group and three seats being occupied by the Asia-Pacific Group.

Following the election, which was seen as a loss by the UK, the Foreign Affairs Select Committee of the House of Commons of the United Kingdom published a report, containing its conclusions and recommendations to the UK government regarding the election.
