= Trade unions in Kazakhstan =

Global Rights Index
- 5 No guarantee of rights

International Labour Organization
- Kazakhstan is a member of the ILO

Convention ratification
- Freedom of Association: 13 December 2000
- Right to Organise: 18 May 2001

The first trade union in Kazakhstan was founded in 1905 and unions have grown substantially since being reconstituted after the country gained independence in 1991. The country has enshrined the right to freedom of association in the constitution and has ratified the International Labour Organization (ILO) conventions 87, the Freedom of Association and Protection of the Right to Organise Convention, and 98, the Right to Organise and Collective Bargaining Convention, Trade union membership is high, representing 44.5 percent of the salaried workforce in 2019. Collective bargaining agreements reached by unions also help workers that are not members of unions as they are binding on employees that are not union members as well as those that are. Trade unions are part of national bodies like the Federation of Trade Unions of Kazakhstan (FPRK) and unions that are independent of the government find it hard to operate.

== History ==
The first union to be founded in what is now Kazakhstan was the Union of Workers of the Assumption Copper Mine, founded on 6 December 1905. During the Soviet period, when Kazakhstan was known as the Kazakh Soviet Socialist Republic, collective bargaining and freedom of association were banned. The state was the sole employer and trade unions were part of the structure of the state. In 1991, when the country gained independence, many of these enterprises were privatised. Market reform led to unemployment and a weakening of social protections that created a demand for collective bargaining. In 1993, the country joined the International Labour Organization (ILO). The right to freedom of association was enshrined in Article 23 of the constitution.

In 2000, a law titled On Social Partnership in the Republic of Kazakhstan was passed that attempted to regulate relationships between the worker and companies and reduce the risk of conflict. On 13 December, the country ratified ILO convention 87, the Freedom of Association and Protection of the Right to Organise Convention, and 98, the Right to Organise and Collective Bargaining Convention, on 18 May 2001.. The 2007 Labour Code restricted the right of workers to organise strikes. During the decade, however, workers rights deteriorated and the activity of trade unions was curtailed.

On 16 December 2011, there was a violent clash between workers and police in Zhanaozen where 17 workers were killed. 42,653 workers took part but it was one of many protests in the region. In 2014, legislation was introduced that required local unions to join larger federations. The government responded by introducing more crackdowns on workers rights, including restricting the ability for unions to operate without alignment with government policy. The Labour Code introduced in 2015 added further restrictions on trade union activity. Trade unions that are independent of the government find it hard to register and operate. Human Rights Watch noted that, in 2024, the right to freedom of association for trade unions and the right to strike are restricted both in law and in practice.

Trade union membership in the country is high. Between 1995 and 2016, union membership in the private sector grew from 8 percent of the workforce to 41 percent. More recently, union membership has increased 11 percent between 2015 and 2019, reaching a total of 2,967,000 employees or 44.5 percent of the salaried workforce.

== Role and structure ==
The role and responsibilities of trade unions in Kazakhstan is enshrined in laws introduced in 2014 and 2015. As a member of the Eurasian Economic Union, some of these laws are governed by international treaty. Unions are required to be legal entities created as public association) according to civil law. Although they act primarily in the interest of their members, unions can also represent non-members. Collective agreements are binding on all employers in the industry and region represented by the union. Unions are required to be legal entities created as public associations according to civil law.

Union structure in the country is based five different types of union, the republican association of the trade unions, territorial association of the trade unions, sectoral trade unions, local trade unions and a primary trade union organisation. The last type of organisation in the list does not have to be a legal entity and can have a minimum of two members. In 2022, there were more than 18,000 primary, 445 city and district and 180 regional unions. Local unions can represent more than one company in the same industry but they and industrial unions are limited to representing members of their industries. An official union must have a minimum of five members.

The largest national body is the Federation of Trade Unions of Kazakhstan (FPRK). It is linked to the government. There are two other federations, the Kazakhstan Federation of Labor (KFL) and the "Amanat" Commonwealth of Trade Unions. Trade union membership varies by region, ranging from 36.9 percent of employed people in Turkistan to 79.7 percent in West Kazakhstan.

== Influence and impact ==
Between 1996 and 2015, the number of workers covered by collective bargaining rose from 35 percent to 60 percent. At the regional and company level, most collective agreements do not regulate or guarantee minimum wages and employment. In 2020, women represented 52.5 percent of the membership of the FPRK, lower than the figure five years before of 58 percent.
