= Okowa (surname) =

Okowa is a surname, and may refer to:

- Ifeanyi Okowa
- Tonobok Okowa
- Phoebe Okowa
- Marilyn Okowa-Daramola
