= Apoorv Om =

Indian artist and Deaf rights activist

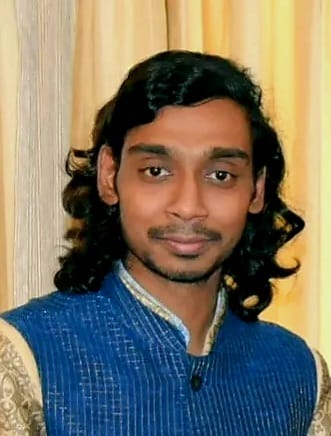
- Born: 14 December 1994 (age 31); New Delhi, India

Apoorv Om is a deaf and Young Innovative artist and activist from New Delhi who advocates for deaf inclusion into the mainstream. Honoured as a Youth Activist for the UN Sustainable Development Goals and invited to the Second International Conference on Youth Volunteering & Dialogue at UNESCO's Headquarters, Om was awarded India's National Award for Empowerment of Persons with Disabilities(Divyangjan) by President of India and Ministry of Social Justice and Empowerment, Department of Emp. of PwDs, Government of India, on event of International Day of Persons with Disabilities at New Delhi on 3 December 2017 . The President of the UN ECOSOC invited him to ECOSOC Youth Forum 2019 at United Nations headquarter, New York. Mr. Apoorv spoke about Climate action for paper recycling initiatives at all levels.

He advocates for using the many digital technologies already available, such as voice-to-text apps, to help disabled people and the wider population communicate with each other in real-time. Focusing on digital technology to foster inclusion is even better than using sign language, he says, because each country's version of sign language is different and thus creates further barriers to interacting with those who can hear and speak.

A yoga instructor, sketch artist and 2D/3D hanging model architect as well, Om meets with and presents his artwork to prominent figures around the world as he advocates for inclusion of disabled people. He has presented personalized portrait paintings to the President of United Nations General Assembly, Miroslav Lajčák, India Prime Minister Narendra Modi, former UN Secretary-General Ban Ki-moon, United Nations Deputy Secretary-General Amina J. Mohammed, cricket legend Sachin Tendulkar, and President of the United Nations ECOSOC, Marie Chatardová (Permanent Representative of the Czech Republic).His innovative artwork-painting

of the International Court of Justice, Peace Palace including portraits of all 15 judges of the World Court accepted by Mr. Rony Abraham, President, and Mr. Dalveer Bhandari, Judge ICJ and the painting currently exhibited at Peace Palace The Hague, Netherlands.

His hanging 2D/3D models have been exhibited at the UNESCO Headquarters in Paris and in the museum of the Supreme Court of India.

Apoorv was chosen as FIT India Ambassador in 2022 by FIT India, Sports Authority of India, Govt of India.

== Work ==
Apoorv Om work for making inclusive society for deaf including inclusive setting of educational institution, office and everywhere else. Apoorv Om advocates protecting the right of equality of person with disabilities from grass root level to International Platform like United Nation Headquarter at New York City, United Nation Office at Geneva, UNESCO Paris and from several other places. While speaking to Times of India he told ""Apoorv wants to use his position as a UN volunteer to find to find ways to make conversations inclusive for those with hearing impairment anywhere".

He also raises the issues faced by disabled children even at the platform of the International court of Justice.

He is also an artist and has created portrait drawings, some of which have been presented to notable individuals during in-person meetings. On the law day 26 November, the Chief Justice of India was receive a handmade portrait from deaf artist Mr. Apoorv Om including six more Chief Justices of the Supreme Court of India.

He is also the innovator of hanging 3-D model of buildings.

He is a certified Yoga Trainers and provides free education of Yoga to children and youth coming from underprivileged society. He is making awareness about the benefit of Pranayam, Meditation and Yogic science for health and wellness of peoples.

He also teaches art and craft to the children, freely.

He is also creating awareness among the people of the society about the value of natural resources like water and Gardens.

== Awards ==
1. National Award for Empowerment of Persons with Disabilities (Divgangjan)-2017 awarded by the Honorable President of India, Shri Ram Nath Kovind in recognition of His/Her outstanding Performance as role Model among Persons with Disabilities (Divyangjan) in the category of hearing impairment.

2. National Gaurav Award-2017 for his achievements in the category of Brave Heart.

== Honours ==
- Invited by the President of International Court of Justice on event of 70th anniversary of ICJ in Netherlands.
- Honoured by HH Irina Bokova, the Director-General of UNESCO with award International artist, deaf student and UNESCO Youth volunteer, 2017.
- His innovative Artwork_hanging 3-D Model of UNESCO Headquarter building was accepted by Director General of UNESCO, HH Irina Bokova and placed in the main exhibition hall of UNESCO headquarter.
- Honoured by Mr. Michael Mooler, Director General of United Nations Office at Geneva on 29 September 2017.
- Honoured by Mr. Miroslav Lajčák, President United Nations General Assembly on 9 March 2018 at New York City, United States.
