= Trade unions in Brunei =

- National organization(s): Brunei Oilfield Workers Union; BMTA/PGGMB
- Total union membership: 1500

International Labour Organization
- Brunei is a member of the ILO

Brunei has 3 registered trade unions in the country. Its economy is primarily state owned oil and natural gas exports. Brunei Oilfield Workers Union, which was established in 1964 has 500 members and is the only union believed to be active. According to the International Trade Union Confederation, it is not independent of the government.

== Background ==
Brunei was a British colony since 1888, and became fully independent in 1984. That same year, it became a member state of the United Nations. In 2007 it joined as a member of the International Labour Organization. Collective agreement frameworks are non-existent, and strikes are forbidden.

It has ratified 5 ILO Conventions as of 2026, neither of which include the Freedom of Association and the Right to Strike.
