= Ajudua =

- Gender: Male
- Language(s): Yoruba

Origin
- Word/name: Nigeria
- Meaning: represents practicality, realism, reliability, discipline, sincerity and experience.

Ajudua is a Nigerian surname. Notable people with the surname include:

- Benedicta Ajudua (born 1980), Nigerian sprinter
- Fred Ajudua, Nigerian lawyer and criminal
- Princess Pat Ajudua (born 1962), Nigerian lawyer and parliamentarian
