= Egbetamah Collins =

Nigerian politicians

Egbetamah Ovie Collins is a Nigerian politician. He currently serves as the State Representatives representing Udu constituency at the Delta State House of Assembly.
