= Right to Strike under ILO Convention No. 87 =

International Court of Justice opinion (2023)

- Court: International Court of Justice
- Full case name: Right to Strike under ILO Convention No. 87 (Request for Advisory Opinion)
- Started: 16 November 2023
- Decided: 21 May 2026
- Transcript: Opinion

Court membership
- Judges sitting: Yuji Iwasawa (President); Julia Sebutinde (Vice-President); Peter Tomka; Ronny Abraham; Xue Hanqin; Dalveer Bhandari; Georg Nolte; Hilary Charlesworth; Leonardo Nemer Caldeira Brant; Juan Manuel Gómez Robledo; Sarah Cleveland; Bogdan Aurescu; Dire Tladi; Mahmoud Daifallah Hmoud

Case opinions
- The right to strike of workers and their organizations is protected under the Freedom of Association and Protection of the Right to Organise Convention, 1948 (No. 87) (10–4)
- Concurrence: Iwasawa, Sebutinde, Bhandari, Nolte, Gómez Robledo, Cleveland, Tladi
- Dissent: Tomka, Abraham, Xue, Hmoud

Right to Strike under ILO Convention No. 87 is an advisory opinion issued by the International Court of Justice in May 2026, following a request by the International Labour Organization (ILO) in November 2023. The Court determined that the right to strike is protected under ILO Convention 87, which recognises freedom of association and the right to organise.

== Background ==
Whether the right to strike is protected under ILO Convention No. 87 has been in debate since the 1950's, with the debate first being sparked by a statement from a employer's representative in the Committee for Freedom of Association in 1953, stating that the right to strike is not governed by any international instruments and thereby the ILO cannot exercise their supervision over this matter. Since then, a persistent disagreement has existed between workers' and employers' groups in the ILO on whether Convention No. 87 encompasses the right to strike. The employers' groups argue for a literal interpretation of the text of the convention and the preparatory material of the convention, both of which have no mention of the right to strike. While, the workers' groups argue for a dynamic interpretation of the convention to include protection of right to strike which they hold is supported by the object and purpose of the convention, related treaties such as the ILO Constitution and the Philadelphia Declaration, and case law on the matter.

On the other hand, the Committee of Experts, a supervisory body of the ILO, has consistently held that the right to strike is protected under Convention No.87. Workers' groups have relied on this interpretation to support their stance, while the employers' groups have argued that the Committee of Experts' opinion on the interpretation of Convention No. 87 has no binding power as it is merely a supervisory body and not adjudicatory.

In 2012, this persistent disagreement of the employers' groups with the interpretation of Convention No. 87 by the Committee of Experts culminated in an impasse when the employers' groups refused to acknowledge the non-compliance cases on the right to strike which led to the Committee on the Application of Standards not reviewing any non-compliance cases that year. The governing body in 2013 had a discussion on whether the dispute should be referred to the ICJ under Article 37, but eventually agreed on the conducting of a tripartite discussion on the matter. As the ILO's tripartite constituents(governments, employers and trade unions) were unable to resolve how to interpret the right to strike, the governing body voted to seek the opinion of the ICJ.

== Opinion ==
In an opinion delivered on 21 May 2026, by a 10–4 vote, the court concluded that the right to strike of workers and their organisations is protected under ILO Convention No. 87. It did not make any determination on the precise content, scope or conditions for the exercise of that right. President Iwasawa and Judges Nolte, Gómez Robledo, and Tladi wrote separate opinions. Vice-President Sebutinde and Judges Bhandari and Cleveland wrote declarations. Judges Tomka, Abraham, Xue, and Hmoud wrote dissenting opinions.

=== Majority Opinion ===
In the majority opinion the court opted for a dynamic interpretation as under the Article 31 of the Vienna Convention on the Law of Treaties (VCLT). Article 31 of the VCLT states that a treaty must be "interpreted in good faith in accordance with the ordinary meaning to be given to the terms of the treaty in their context and in the light of its object and purpose." The court examines three provisions of the convention in particular, that is, Article 2 on the right to organize, Article 3 on the right of organizations to conduct activities and programs, and Article 10 defining organizations as any organization working towards furtherance of group interests. The court held that a reading of these three provisions together in their ordinary meaning entails that the workers' and employers' have a right join organization which conduct activities and programs in the furtherance of the interests of the respective groups. The court then applied this interpretation to strike action to hold that 'strike action' being a form or activity or program in furtherance of interest of workers' groups, it would be deemed to be protected under this convention.

The court subsequently notes that object and purpose of the conventions is to protect freedom of association as a means to improve labor conditions, and that strike action is often employed as a means to achieve better labor conditions. The court also observes that the convention does not explicitly exclude the right to strike. The court further noted the various judicial rulings and the views of the ILO supervisory bodies recognizing the right to strike under Convention No. 87. With regards to the preparatory material not including any mention of 'strike action', the court held that preparatory material is a supplementary means of interpretation under Article 32 of the VCLT, and therefore, cannot supersede the primary means of interpretation under Article 31. In light of all this, the court in finality decided that the reading of the convention as per Article 31 of the VCLT would entail that the right to strike is protected under Convention No. 87.

=== Minority Opinion ===
In his dissenting opinion, Tomka argues that modern treaty interpretation gives primacy to the text and the preparatory material on the making of the treaty. Tomka then states that a reading of the plain text of the convention in light of the preparatory material would provide that the right to strike is not included in the convention. While Xue and Hmoud in their dissenting opinions highlight the overemphasis of the majority on the practice of ILO supervisory bodies and human rights instruments exceeding the scope of treaty interpretation by examining the right to strike within the broader context of international law as a whole. Abraham in his dissent, states that the right to strike is distinct from freedom of association as recognized by various international law instruments such as the ICESCR. In virtue of such distinction, Abraham holds that the deliberate exclusion of right to strike from Convention No. 87 implies that it is not protected under the convention.
