= Chaloka Beyani =

Zambian legal academic and U.N. Under-Secretary-General

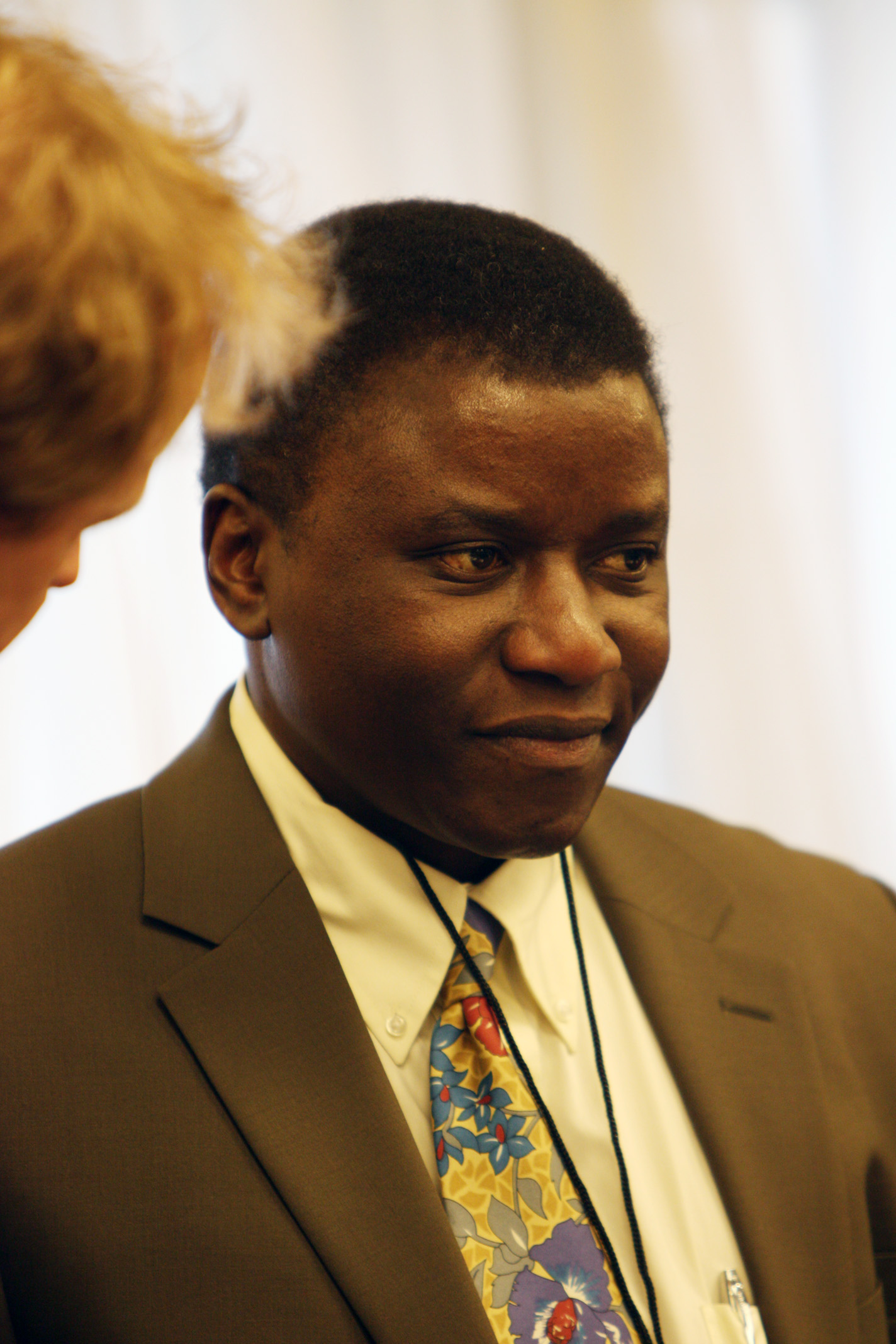
- Dr Chaloka Beyani at the Human Rights Advisory Group meeting at the U.K. House of Commons, 2 December 2010
- Born: 13 August 1959 (age 67); Chalimbana, Zambia
- Citizenship: Zambia
- Education: University of Zambia; University of Oxford
- Occupation: International law scholar
- Years active: 1984–present
- Notable work: Protection of the Right to Seek and Obtain Asylum under the African Human Rights System (2013); Human Rights Standards and the Free Movement of People within States (2000)
- Title: Professor, Dr

Special Adviser on the Prevention of Genocide to the Secretary-General of the United Nations
- Incumbent
- Assumed office August 2025
- Preceded by: Alice Wairimu Nderitu

United Nations Special Rapporteur on the Human Rights of Internally Displaced Persons
- In office November 2010 – October 2016
- Preceded by: Walter Kälin
- Succeeded by: Cecilia Jimenez-Damary

Expert Advisory Group for the United Nations Secretary General’s High-Level Panel on Internal Displacement
- In office December 2019 – August 2025 Serving with Alexandra Bilak, Walter Kälin, Elizabeth Ferris

Chaloka Beyani is a Zambian lawyer and legal scholar. He is the Special Adviser on the Prevention of Genocide to the Secretary-General of the United Nations and an Under-Secretary-General of the United Nations. He was formerly an associate professor of international law at the London School of Economics and Political Science (LSE). He has worked and published extensively in the fields of international human rights law, international criminal law and international humanitarian law, as well as on issues relating to humanitarian assistance and population displacements, in particular internal displacement. In 2023 Beyani was nominated by Zambia for election to the International Court of Justice (ICJ). The Netherlands co-nominated Beyani. Zambia had previously put Beyani forth for the 2017 International Court of Justice judges election, but withdrew his name prior to the candidate selection process. If elected, he would have been the first Zambian judge at the ICJ. After five rounds of voting in the Security Council and one round of voting in the General Assembly, Beyani was not elected.

Beyani is a recognized international and United Nations expert on internally displaced persons (IDPs), population transfers, the rights-based approach to development, climate change, sexual and reproductive health, mercenaries and private military companies, making treaties and making constitutions.

His analysis and arguments on the protection of the human rights of IDPs have become highly influential in shaping state policies on the protection of IDPs, especially in Africa.

== Early life and education ==
Beyani was born in Chalimbana and grew up in Sinakoba, Zambia in 1959.

He received an LL.B. degree in 1982 and an LL.M. degree in 1984, both from the University of Zambia.

In 1988, Beyani matriculated at St Cross College of the University of Oxford, to study for a Doctor of Philosophy (D.Phil.) in international law. He later transferred to Wolfson College. His doctoral supervisor was Professor Sir Ian Brownlie, Chichele Professor of Public International Law at All Souls College. He received his D.Phil. degree in 1992.

His D.Phil. thesis was entitled “Restrictions on internal freedom of movement and residence in international law”. A revised version was later published by Oxford University Press. It is considered a “ground-breaking monograph”.

== Academic career ==
Beyani taught at the London School of Economics 1996-2025, where he was Associate Professor of Law. There, he taught International Human Rights Law, International Law and the Movement of Persons within States, and International Law and the Movement of Persons Between States.

He was a Lecturer in Law at the University of Zambia (1984-1988), where he taught international law and human rights. At the University of Oxford (1992-1995) he was a Research Fellow at Wolfson College, with Lectureships in Law at Exeter College and St. Catherine’s College, and a Crown Prince of Jordan Fellow, Queen Elizabeth House (QEH), as part of the Refugee Studies Centre (RSC). He was a Visiting Professor of International Law at the University of Toronto Faculty of Law and at Santa Clara University School of Law.

Beyani has received research grants from the Association of Commonwealth Universities (Academic Fellowship) 1988-1991, the Ford Foundation (1991-1992), the Nuffield Foundation (1990 and 1992) and the Shaler Adams Foundation 1995.

He was an Editor of the Journal of African Law, published by Cambridge University Press on behalf of SOAS University of London and of the International Journal of Refugee Law and, until 2020, of the Journal of International Humanitarian Legal Studies.

Beyani was a member of the San Remo International Institute of Humanitarian Law 2009-2025.

He was a member of PeaceRep, an international research consortium led by Edinburgh Law School until 2025.

He was a nonresident senior fellow in the Brookings-LSE Project on Internal Displacement at the Brookings Institution.

== Legal consulting ==
Beyani has acted as a legal advisor, consultant and expert to a number of UN entities, including the Office of the High Commissioner for Human Rights, the Office of the High Commissioner for Refugees (UNHCR), the World Health Organization, the United Nations Population Fund and the United Nations Development Fund for Women, and to the European Union (EU), the Commonwealth Secretariat and the African Union (AU). He was a member of the High-Level Panel of Eminent Persons of the African Union on the Formation of an African Union Government and was a member of the 2009 joint AU-EU Ad hoc Expert Group on the Principle of Universal Jurisdiction.

Beyani was among a team of experts appointed by the International Commission on Intervention and State Sovereignty (ICISS) to formulate the 'responsibility to protect'. His role was to examine 'state sovereignty' and 'intervention' in international law. His findings were reflected in the eventual wording of the Responsibility to Protect, which was endorsed by the UN's World Summit of 2005.

As Legal Adviser to the International Conference on the Great Lakes Region, Beyani drafted and negotiated the 2006 Great Lakes Pact on Peace, Stability and Development, with 11 peace treaties under it, including the first legally binding treaty on protection for and assistance to IDPs.

Beyani was a member of the official Committee of Experts that drafted the 2010 Constitution of Kenya.

He was an official mediator between the Government of Mozambique and the armed opposition rebel group RENAMO during the peace process that led to the peace agreement in Mozambique in 2019. He drafted amendments to the Constitution of Mozambique to incorporate the agreement on devolution.

Beyani served as a member of the Commonwealth Elections Observer Group which observed the Kenyan general elections held on August 9, 2022.

== Human rights work ==
In August 2025, United Nations Secretary-General António Guterres appointed Beyani to the Office of the Special Adviser on the Prevention of Genocide (OSAPG), one of two Special Advisers leading the Office on Genocide Prevention and the Responsibility to Protect (OGPRP).

In 2005, Beyani was appointed African Union Expert to draft and negotiate the African Union Convention for the Protection and Assistance of Internally Displaced Persons (the Kampala Convention), which was adopted in 2009 and came into force in 2012.

Beyani was appointed United Nations Special Rapporteur on the Human Rights of Internally Displaced Persons by the UN Human Rights Council in 2010. He served until 2016. He published almost 40 reports.

He was Chairperson of the Coordination Committee of Special Procedures of the UN Office of the High Commissioner for Human Rights (OHCHR) from 2013-2014. Its main function is to enhance coordination among UN human rights mandate holders and to act as a bridge between them and the OHCHR, the broader UN human rights framework and civil society.

In 2018, the South Sudan government requested Beyani to provide guidance on key tasks related to the Kampala Convention: assisting in the ratification process, drafting necessary national legislation for implementation, creating a framework for the protection and assistance of IDPs and establishing provisions for sustainable solutions. In June 2019, South Sudan adopted this draft legislation as the Protection and Assistance to Internally Displaced Persons Act 2019.

In 2019, Beyani was invited by the UN and the government of Ethiopia to engage in similar work there.

Beyani was appointed in 2019 as a member of the Expert Advisory Group for the United Nations Secretary General’s High-Level Panel on Internal Displacement.

In 2020 Beyani was appointed by the UN High Commissioner for Human Rights as a member of the UN Independent Fact-Finding Mission on Libya, to document alleged violations and abuses of international human rights law and international humanitarian law by all parties in Libya since the start of 2016. The group presented a number of reports, from 2021 to 2023. In 2024, the International Criminal Court announced six arrest warrants based on the work Beyani and the investigative team had done.

Beyani was a member of the UNHCR's IDP Protection Expert Group (IPEG).

Beyani conducted UNHCR-sponsored IDP-related national consultations in Armenia in December 2024 to assist Armenia’s efforts to draft laws to protect and assist IDPs in accordance with international standards and best practices.

In 2024, the African Union Commission’s Department of Political Affairs, Peace and Security (AUC-DPAPS), with the Centre for the Study of Violence and Reconciliation (CSVR) and supported by the European Union, appointed a Reference Group on Transitional Justice in Africa. Beyani was appointed a member of the Reference Group for the period 1 August 2024 to 31 July 2027.

He was a member of the UK Foreign Secretary’s Advisory Group on Human Rights 2010-2025.

== Selected publications ==
=== Books ===
- Protection of the Right to Seek and Obtain Asylum under the African Human Rights System (Martinus Nijhoff, 2013) ISBN 9789004163416
- Collected Essays on the Use of International Law (Cameron May Publishing, 2013) ISBN 9781907174124
- African Exodus: Refugee Crisis, Human Rights, & the 1969 OAU Convention (with Chris Stringer) (Human Rights First, 1995) ISBN 9780934143738
- Human Rights Standards and the Free Movement of People within States (Oxford University Press, 2000) ISBN 9780198268215
- Blackstone’s Guide to the Asylum and Immigration Act 1996 (with Leonard Leigh) (Blackstone Press, 1996) ISBN 9781854315915

=== Journal articles ===
- 'Conceptual Challenges and Practical Solutions in Situations of Internal Displacement' (with Natalia Krynsky Baal and Martina Caterina), Vol. 52 (2016), Forced Migration Review, pp. 39–42 ISSN 1460-9819
- 'The Politics of International Law: Transformation of the Guiding Principles on Internal Displacement from Soft Law into Hard Law, Vol. 102 (2008), Proceedings of the ASIL Annual Meeting, pp. 194–198 ISSN 0272-5037
- 'Recent Developments in the African Human Rights System 2004-2006', Vol. 7, Issue 3 (2007), Human Rights Law Review, pp. 582–608 ISSN 1461-7781
- 'Recent Developments: The Elaboration of a Legal Framework for the Protection of Internally Displaced Persons in Africa' Vol. 50, Issue 2 (2006), Journal of African Law, pp. 187–197 ISSN 0021-8553
- 'Governance and Human Rights in the SADC Region', Vol. 3, No. 1 (2004), Journal of African Elections, pp. 62–80 ISSN 1609-4700
- 'International Legal Criteria for the Separation of Members of Armed Forces, Armed Bands and Militia from Refugees in the Territories of Host States', Vol. 12, Issue suppl. 1 (2000), International Journal of Refugee Law, pp. 251–271 ISSN 0953-8186
- 'State Responsibility for the Prevention and Resolution of Forced Population Displacements in International Law', Vol. 7, Special Issue, Summer (1995), International Journal of Refugee Law, pp. 130–147 ISSN 0953-8186
- 'The Needs of Refugee Women: A Human-Rights Perspective', Vol. 3, No. 2 (1995), Gender and Development, pp. 29–35 ISSN 1355-2074

=== Chapters in books ===
- 'Reconstituting the universal: human rights as a regional idea', in Conor Gearty and Costas Douzinas (eds.), The Cambridge Companion to Human Rights Law (Cambridge University Press, 2012) ISBN 9781107016248
- 'The Role of Human Rights Bodies in Protecting Refugees', in Anne Bayefsky (ed.), Human Rights and Refuges, Internally Displaced Persons and Migrant Workers (Kluwer, 2006) ISBN 9789004144835
- 'The Legal Premises for the International Protection of Human Rights', in Guy S. Goodwin-Gill and Stefan Talmon (eds.), The Reality of International Law: Essays in Honour of Ian Brownlie (Oxford University Press, 1999) ISBN 9780198268376
- 'Toward a More Effective Guarantee of Women’s Rights in the African Human Rights System', in Rebecca J. Cook (ed.), Human Rights of Women: National and International Perspectives (University of Pennsylvania Press, 1994) ISBN 9780812215380

== Organizations ==
Beyani was formerly a member of the Board of the International Centre for the Protection of Human Rights (INTERIGHTS), the Open Society Justice Initiative and the African Book Trust, and the Council of Oxfam and Minority Rights Group International (MRG).
