= Princess Pat Ajudua =

Nigerian lawyer and politician (born 1962)

Honorable Princess Pat Adankele Ajudua PhD

Member of the Delta State House of Assembly for Oshimili North constituency
- In office 2007–Date
- Preceded by: Felicia Nwaeze

Personal details
- Born: Princess Patience Adankele Ngegwe
- Citizenship: Nigerian
- Party: People's Democratic Party (Nigeria) (1999 - 2002, 2011 - Date)
- Other political affiliations: ANPP (2002 - 2005); Accord Party (2006 - 2011)
- Spouse: Fred Ajudua
- Children: Bobo Ajudua
- Education: Bachelor of Laws; Master of Law; Master of Business Administration in Banking and Finance; Doctor of Law
- Alma mater: University of Lagos; Rivers State University of Science and Technology; Lagos State University
- Occupation: Parliamentarian
- Profession: Lawyer; Banker
- Committees: Joint committee on Special Bills, Agriculture and Natural Resources (chairperson); Committee on Judiciary (chairperson); Central Organizing committee, Delta State 30th Anniversary (member); Joint committee on Housing, Women Affairs and Social Development (member); Ad-hoc Committee for the Review of the Delta State 2019 Customary Court Law (member)
- Portfolio: Minority Leader (2007, 2011); Chief Whip

Princess Patience Adankele Ajudua (born 7 April 1962), known as Pat Ajudua is a Nigerian lawyer and parliamentarian. She was the Chief whip of the Delta State House of Assembly.

== Early life and education ==
Ajudua is from Eleme, Rivers State. She is of the Ngegwe royal family. She attended Federal Government Girls' College, Abuloma, from 1974 to 1979. And then School of Basic Studies from 1979 to 1981. Both schools are in Port Harcourt.

She attended University of Lagos from 1981 to 1984; Rivers State University of Science and Technology from 1989 to 1990; and then Lagos State University from 1990 to 1992; obtaining her law degree. She was called to bar in 2015, having enrolled in the Nigerian Law School in the previous year. She attended University of Lagos again from 1996 to 1997 for a postgraduate degree. She is a member of the Chartered Institute of Arbitrators (MCIARB).

== Political career ==
Ajudua was first elected into the Delta state assembly to represent Oshimili North in 2007. She has occupied the seat since then, culminating four terms. She was a member of Accord party when she contested and won in 2007 and 2011. In 2011, a different candidate was declared winner after the 2011 Nigerian general election, she took the matter to court and after a legal battle, it was determined that her opponent was wrongfully declared as victorious and she was announced as the substantive winner.

She won a re-election in the 2019 Delta State House of Assembly election under the People's Democratic Party (PDP).

She contested in the primary election to represent the PDP for the in forthcoming general elections for Aniocha/Oshimili Federal Constituency in the Nigerian House of Representatives. She lost to the incumbent, Ndudi Elumelu, coming in second place by 80 votes to 35 votes.

She was appointed the chairperson of the PDP campaign council of Oshimili North for the forthcoming 2023 Nigerian general election. She was part of Governor Ifeanyi Okowa's entourage that paid a condolence visit to the Keshi family after the death of former Nigerian football team captain and coach Stephen Keshi.

She was the chairperson of the joint committee on Special Bills, Agriculture and Natural Resources, she was also the chairperson of the committee for Judiciary. She was a member of the Central organizing committee of the Delta state 30th anniversary celebration, and she was also a member of the joint committee on Housing, Women Affairs and Social Development. She was a member of the ad-hoc committee for the review of the Delta state 2019 customary court law. Ajudua is currently the commissioner of women affairs and social development

== Personal life ==
She is married to Fred Ajudua. They have a son together, Bobo Ajudua.
