= Phoebe Okowa =

Kenyan legal academic and Judge on the International Court of Justice

Phoebe Nyawade Okowa
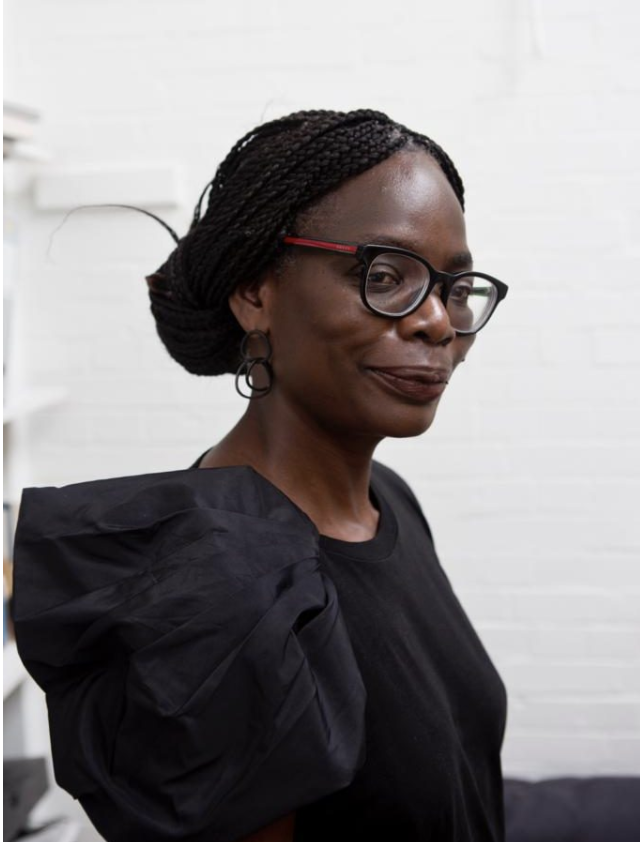

Judge of the International Court of Justice
- Incumbent
- Assumed office 12 November 2025
- Preceded by: Abdulqawi Yusuf

Member of the United Nations International Law Commission
- In office 2023–2027

Personal details
- Born: January 1, 1965 (age 61) Kericho, Kenya
- Education: Wadham College, Oxford
- Occupation: Judge, Lawyer, Legal Academic, Author

Phoebe Nyawade Okowa is a Kenyan lawyer. She has served as a judge of the International Court of Justice since November 2025. She was Professor of Public International Law and Director of Graduate Studies at Queen Mary University of London.

An advocate of the High Court of Kenya, she has acted as counsel and consultant to governments and non-governmental organisations on questions of international law before domestic and international courts including the International Court of Justice. In 2016, she was appointed by Kenya to be a member of the Permanent Court of Arbitration at The Hague from 2017 to 2022. In 2021, she was elected as a member of the International Law Commission from 2023 to 2027.

== Early life and education ==
Okowa was born in Kericho on 1 January 1965 to Luo parents Martha Achieng Okowa and Moses Okowa Apamo. She graduated at the top of her class with a Bachelor of Law (LLB) with First Class Honours from the University of Nairobi, Kenya in 1987. Okowa was the first woman to be awarded a first-class honours degree in the history of the Faculty of Law of the University of Nairobi. She was called to the Kenyan Bar as an Advocate in 1990.

Okowa then studied at Wadham College, Oxford on a Foreign and Commonwealth Office Scholarship, obtaining the degree of Bachelor of Civil Law (BCL) in 1990. She completed her doctoral thesis (D.Phil.) at Oxford in 1994 under the supervision of Professor Sir Ian Brownlie, the Chichele Professor of International Law. Her monograph on State Responsibility for Transboundary Air Pollution published by Oxford University Press remains the definitive work on the legal challenges that environmental harm presents for traditional methods of accountability in International Law.

== Academic career ==
Okowa taught Public International Law, British Constitutional Law and Private International Law as a member of the Faculty of Law at the University of Bristol before her appointment at Queen Mary University of London. She has held visiting appointments at the Graduate Institute of International and Development Studies in Geneva, Katholieke Universiteit Leuven, University of Antwerp, Pace University School of Law‌ in White Plains, New York, Catholic University of Lille, Erik Castrén Institute of International Law and Human Rights, University of Helsinki, Lauterpacht Centre for International Law at the Faculty of Law, University of Cambridge, University of Stockholm, WZB Berlin Social Science Center Center for Global Constitutionalism, and St John's College, Oxford, and has lectured at the Tokyo International Law Seminar of Japan's Ministry of Foreign Affairs and for the United Nations at its Regional Course in International Law for Latin America and the Caribbean, Regional Course in International Law for Asia-Pacific, and Regional Course in International Law for Africa. In 2011 and 2015 she was Hauser Global Visiting Professor of Law at New York University School of Law. Okowa was appointed by Princeton University's Center for Human Values as a Fellow in Law and Normative Thinking for 2024-25.

She is a member of the: Advisory Committee on International Dispute Resolution of the Centre for International Law of the National University of Singapore Faculty of Law; Advisory Board of the British Institute of International and Comparative Law; Editorial Advisory Board of the African Yearbook of International and Comparative Law; Advisory Board of the African Association of International Law; Executive Committee of the International Society of Public Law (ICON-S); International Advisory Board of the Stockholm Centre for International Law and Justice; African Society of International Law; British Branch of the International Law Association; and Society of Legal Scholars.

Okowa was awarded an Honorary Doctorate in Law by the University of Stockholm in 2024. In 2022, she was made an Elder of the Order of the Burning Spear (E.B.S.) for Distinguished Service in International Law by the Government of Kenya.

In 2026, she taught a course at The Hague Academy of International Law on "Historic Responsibility for Colonial Wrongs in Public International Law".

== Legal career ==
Okowa has acted as counsel and consultant to governments and non-governmental organisations on questions of international law before domestic and international courts including before the International Court of Justice, involving cases concerning the application of the Convention on the Prevention and Punishment of the Crime of Genocide, maritime delimitations, the Legal Consequences of the Separation of the Chagos Archipelago from Mauritius in 1965, Legal consequences arising from the policies and practices of Israel in the occupied Palestinian territory including East Jerusalem, Obligations of States in respect of Climate Change, Obligations of Israel in relation to the Presence and Activities of the United Nations, Other International Organizations and Third States in and in relation to the Occupied Palestinian Territory, and Right to Strike under ILO Convention No. 87, and before the International Tribunal for the Law of the Sea in Request for an Advisory Opinion submitted by the Commission of Small Island States on Climate Change and International Law.

In 2016, she was appointed a member of the Permanent Court of Arbitration at The Hague by Kenya.

The Government of Kenya nominated Okowa for election to the UN International Law Commission (ILC) in May 2021. She was co-nominated by the United Kingdom and endorsed by the African Union. Okowa received 162 votes in the United Nations General Assembly, becoming the first African woman elected to serve as an ILC member for a period of five years, effective January 1, 2023. She was appointed the Chair of the ILC's Drafting Committee for its Seventy-fifth Session (2024).

Okowa was elected an Associate (Associé) of the Institute of International Law (Institut de Droit International) at its 2025 Session in Rabat, Morocco.

In 2025, Okowa was co-nominated by Colombia, Kenya, Namibia, the Netherlands, Romania, South Africa, Sweden and Vanuatu for election as a Judge to the International Court of Justice (ICJ) to fill the vacancy on the Court due to the resignation of Judge Abdulqawi Ahmed Yusuf. On November 12, 2025, after three rounds of voting, she received eight votes in the United Nations Security Council and 106 in the United Nations General Assembly and, therefore having received a majority of votes in each body, was elected as a Judge of the ICJ, with effect from that day, until February 5, 2027, being the remainder of the term of Judge Yusuf. Okowa was the first Kenyan to serve on the ICJ.

In January 2026, the Government of Kenya launched Okowa's candidature for election to a full nine-year term at the Court (2027–2036). In July 2026, the Secretary-General of the United Nations reported that Okowa had been co-nominated by The Bahamas, Brazil, Burkina Faso, Colombia, Denmark, Djibouti, Ecuador, Finland, France, Georgia, Greece, Guatemala, Hungary, Kenya, Latvia, Malta, Mauritius, Namibia, Netherlands, Norway, Senegal, Singapore, Slovakia, Slovenia, Spain and Sweden for election as a Judge to the International Court of Justice to fill one of five positions on the Court at the election in November 2026. On November 3, 2026, in the second round of voting in the United Nations Security Council, Okowa received 13 votes and in the third round of voting in the United Nations General Assembly she received 183 votes and therefore, having received a majority of votes in each body, was re-elected as a Judge of the ICJ for a nine-year term beginning on 6 February 2027.

== Selected publications ==
=== Books ===
- State Responsibility for Transboundary Air Pollution in International Law (Oxford University Press, 2000) doi:10.1093/acprof:oso/9780198260974.001.0001 ISBN 9780198260974
- Environmental Law and Justice in Context, Phoebe Okowa and Jonas Ebbesson (eds.) (Cambridge University Press, 2009) doi:10.1017/CBO9780511576027 ISBN 9780521879682

=== Journal articles ===
- ‘The Pitfalls of Unilateral Legislation in International Law: Two Case Studies’, International and Comparative Law Quarterly, Vol. 69, Issue 3 (2020) pp. 685–717
- ‘Sovereignty Contests and the Exploitation of Natural Resources in Conflict Zones’, Current Legal Problems, Vol. 66, Issue 1 (2013) pp. 33–73
- ‘The International Court of Justice and the Georgia/Russia Dispute’, Human Rights Law Review, Vol. 11, Issue 4 (2011) pp. 739–757
- ‘State and Individual Criminal Responsibility in Internal Conflicts: Contours of an Evolving Relationship’, Finnish Yearbook of International Law, Vol. 20 (2009) pp. 143–188
- ‘Case Concerning Ahmadou Sadio Diallo (Republic of Guinea v. Democratic Republic of Congo)’, International and Comparative Law Quarterly, Vol. 57, Issue 1 (2008) pp. 219–224
- ‘Congo’s War: The Legal Dimension of a Protracted Conflict’, British Yearbook of International Law, Vol. 77, Issue 1 (2006) pp. 203–255
- ‘Case Concerning Armed Activities on the Territory of the Congo’, International and Comparative Law Quarterly, Vol. 55, Issue 3 (2006) pp. 742–753
- ‘Procedural Obligations in International Environmental Agreements’, British Yearbook of International Law, Vol. 67, Issue 1 (1996) pp. 275–336
- ‘The EC and International Environmental Agreements’, Yearbook of European Law, Vol. 15, Issue 1 (1994) pp. 169–192

=== Chapters in books ===
- ‘Atmospheric Pollution in International Law’, in Lavanya Rajamani and Jacqueline Peel (eds.), Oxford Handbook of International Environmental Law (Oxford University Press, 2021) ISBN 9780198849155 pp. 475–491
- ‘Principle 18: Notification and Assistance in Case of Emergency’, in Jorge E. Viñuales (ed.), The Rio Declaration on Environment and Development: A Commentary (Oxford, 2015) ISBN 9780199686773 pp. 471–492
- ‘The International Court and the Legacy of the Barcelona Traction Case’, in Charles Jalloh and Olufemi Elias (eds.), Shielding Humanity: Essays in International Law in Honour of Judge Abdul Koroma (Brill, 2015) ISBN 9789004236509 pp. 104–132
- ‘The Security Council, the African Union and the International Criminal Court: Anatomy of a Problematic Relationship’, in Jonas Ebbesson, Marie Jacobsson et al. (eds.), International Law and Changing Perceptions of Security: Liber Amicorum Said Mahmoudi (Brill Nijhoff, 2014) ISBN 9789004274570 pp. 228–234
- ‘Interpreting Constitutive Instruments of International Criminal Tribunals: Reflections on the Special Court for Sierra Leone’, in Malgosia Fitzmaurice, Olufemi Elias and Panos Merkouris (eds.), Treaty Interpretation and the Vienna Convention on the Law of Treaties: 30 Years On (Martinus Nijhoff, 2010) ISBN 9789004181045 pp. 333–355
- ‘Issues of Admissibility and the Law on International Responsibility’,doi:10.1093/he/9780192848642.003.0016 in Malcolm Evans (ed.), International Law doi:10.1093/he/9780192848642.001.0001 (Oxford University Press, 6th ed, 2024) ISBN 9780192848642 pp. 467–498
- ‘Environmental Justice in Situations of Armed Conflict’, in Phoebe Okowa and Jonas Ebbesson (eds.), Environmental Law and Justice in Context (Cambridge University Press, 2009) ISBN 9780521879682 pp. 231–252
- ‘The Settlement of International Environmental Disputes: A Re-appraisal’, in Malcolm Evans (ed.), Remedies in International Law: The Institutional Dilemma (Hart Publishing, 1998) ISBN 9781901362350 pp. 157–172
