= Akpowowo Arthur =

Nigerian politicians

Akpowowo Arthur is a Nigerian politician. He currently serves as the State Representatives representing Ethiope East constituency at the Delta State House of Assembly.
