= Right to Organise and Collective Bargaining Convention, 1949 =

1949 convention of the International Labour Organization

Right to Organise and Collective Bargaining Convention
Convention concerning the Application of the Principles of the Right to Organise and to Bargain Collectively
- Signed: 1 July 1949
- Location: Geneva
- Effective: 19 July 1951
- Condition: 2 ratifications
- Parties: 168
- Depositary: Director-General of the International Labour Office
- Languages: French and English

The Right to Organise and Collective Bargaining Convention (1949) No 98 is an International Labour Organization Convention. It is one of eight ILO fundamental conventions.

Its counterpart on the general principle of freedom of association is the Freedom of Association and Protection of the Right to Organise Convention (1949) No 87.

== Content ==
The Preamble of Convention 98 notes its adoption on 1 July 1949. After this the Convention covers, first, the rights of union members to organise independently, without interference by employers in article 1 to 3. Second, articles 4 to 6 require the positive creation of rights to collective bargaining, and that each member state's law promotes it.

=== Rights to organise ===
Article 1 states that workers must be protected against discrimination for joining a union, particularly conditions of employers to not join a union, dismissal or any other prejudice for having union membership or engaging in union activities. Article 2 requires that both workers and employers' organisations (i.e. trade unions and business confederations) should not be interfered in their own establishment, functioning or administration. Article 2(2) prohibits, in particular, unions being dominated by employers through "financial or other means" (such as a union being given funding by an employer, or the employer influencing who the officials are). Article 3 requires each ILO member give effect to articles 1 and 2 through appropriate machinery, such as a government watchdog.

Article 1
1. Workers shall enjoy adequate protection against acts of anti-union discrimination in respect of their employment.

2. Such protection shall apply more particularly in respect of acts calculated to--

(a) make the employment of a worker subject to the condition that he shall not join a union or shall relinquish trade union membership;
(b) cause the dismissal of or otherwise prejudice a worker by reason of union membership or because of participation in union activities outside working hours or, with the consent of the employer, within working hours.

Article 2
1. Workers' and employers' organisations shall enjoy adequate protection against any acts of interference by each other or each other's agents or members in their establishment, functioning or administration.
2. In particular, acts which are designed to promote the establishment of workers' organisations under the domination of employers or employers' organisations, or to support workers' organisations by financial or other means, with the object of placing such organisations under the control of employers or employers' organisations, shall be deemed to constitute acts of interference within the meaning of this Article.

Article 3
Machinery appropriate to national conditions shall be established, where necessary, for the purpose of ensuring respect for the right to organise as defined in the preceding Articles.

=== Rights to collective bargaining ===
Article 4 goes on to collective bargaining. It requires that the law promotes "the full development and utilisation of machinery for voluntary negotiation" between worker organisations and employer groups to regulation employment "by means of collective agreements." Article 5 states that national law can provide different laws for the police and armed forces, and the Convention does not affect laws that existed when an ILO member ratifies the Convention. Article 6 further gives an exemption for "the position of public servants engaged in the administration of the State".

Article 4
Measures appropriate to national conditions shall be taken, where necessary, to encourage and promote the full development and utilisation of machinery for voluntary negotiation between employers or employers' organisations and workers' organisations, with a view to the regulation of terms and conditions of employment by means of collective agreements.

Article 5
1. The extent to which the guarantees provided for in this Convention shall apply to the armed forces and the police shall be determined by national laws or regulations.
2. In accordance with the principle set forth in paragraph 8 of Article 19 of the Constitution of the International Labour Organisation the ratification of this Convention by any Member shall not be deemed to affect any existing law, award, custom or agreement in virtue of which members of the armed forces or the police enjoy any right guaranteed by this Convention.

Article 6
This Convention does not deal with the position of public servants engaged in the administration of the State, nor shall it be construed as prejudicing their rights or status in any way.

=== Administrative provisions ===
Article 7 says ratifications should be communicated to the ILO Director General. Article 8 says the Convention is only binding on those who have ratified it, although the 1998 Declaration means that this is no longer entirely true: the Convention is binding as a fact of membership in the ILO. Articles 9 and 10 deal with specific territories where the Convention may be applied or modified. Article 11 concerns denunciation of the Convention, although again, because of the 1998 Declaration, it is no longer possible for an ILO member to profess they are not bound by the Convention: it is an essential principle of international law. Article 12 states the Director General shall keep all members notified of which countries have adhered to the Conventions. Article 13 states this shall be communicated to the United Nations. Article 14 states the ILO Governing Body shall produce reports on the working of the Convention. Article 15 deals with revisions to the Convention (none have taken place yet), and article 16 states that the English and French versions are equally authoritative.

== Ratifications ==
Ratifications of the convention

The following countries have ratified ILO Convention 98:

Country	Date	Notes
Albania	3 June 1957	
Algeria	19 November 1962	
Angola	4 June 1976	
Antigua and Barbuda	2 February 1983	
Argentina	24 September 1956	
Armenia	12 November 2003	
Australia	28 February 1973	
Austria	10 November 1951	
Azerbaijan	19 May 1992	
Bahamas	25 May 1976	
Bangladesh	22 June 1972	
Barbados	8 May 1967	
Belarus	6 November 1956	ratified as the Byelorussian SSR
Belgium	10 December 1953	
Belize	15 December 1983	
Benin	16 May 1968	
Bolivia	15 November 1973	
Bosnia and Herzegovina	2 June 1993	
Botswana	22 December 1997	
Brazil	18 November 1952	
Bulgaria	8 June 1959	
Burkina Faso	16 April 1962	
Burundi	10 October 1997	
Cabo Verde	3 April 1979	
Cambodia	23 August 1999	
Cameroon	3 September 1962	
Canada	14 June 2017	In force starting 14 June 2018
Central African Republic	9 June 1964	
Chad	8 June 1961	
Chile	1 February 1999	
Colombia	16 November 1976	
Comoros	23 October 1978	
Congo	26 November 1999	
Democratic Republic of the Congo	16 June 1969	
Costa Rica	2 June 1960	
Côte d'Ivoire	5 May 1961	
Croatia	8 October 1991	
Cuba	29 April 1952	
Cyprus	24 May 1966	
Czech Republic	1 January 1993	
Denmark	15 August 1955	
Djibouti	3 August 1978	
Dominica	28 February 1983	
Dominican Republic	22 September 1953	
Ecuador	28 May 1959	
Egypt	3 July 1954	
Equatorial Guinea	13 August 2001	
Eritrea	22 February 2000	
Estonia	22 March 1994	
Ethiopia	4 June 1963	
Fiji	19 April 1974	
Finland	22 December 1951	
France	26 October 1951	
Gabon	29 May 1951	
Gambia	4 September 2000	
Georgia (country)	22 June 1993	
Germany	8 June 1956	
Ghana	2 July 1959	
Greece	30 March 1962	
Grenada	9 July 1979	
Guatemala	13 February 1952	
Guinea-Bissau	21 February 1977	
Guinea	26 March 1959	
Guyana	8 June 1966	
Haiti	12 April 1957	
Honduras	27 June 1956	
Hungary	6 June 1957	
Iceland	15 July 1952	
Indonesia	15 July 1957	
Iraq	27 November 1962	
Ireland	4 June 1955	
Israel	28 January 1957	
Italy	13 May 1958	
Jamaica	26 December 1962	
Japan	20 October 1953	
Jordan	12 December 1968	
Kazakhstan	18 May 2001	
Kenya	13 January 1964	
Kiribati	3 February 2000	
Kuwait	9 August 2007	
Kyrgyzstan	31 March 1992	
Latvia	27 January 1992	
Lebanon	1 June 1977	
Lesotho	31 October 1966	
Liberia	25 May 1962	
Libya	20 June 1962	
Lithuania	26 September 1994	
Luxembourg	3 March 1958	
Republic of Macedonia	17 November 1991	
Madagascar	3 June 1998	
Malawi	22 March 1965	
Malaysia	5 June 1961	
Maldives	4 January 2013	
Mali	2 March 1964	
Malta	4 January 1965	
Mauritania	3 December 2001	
Mauritius	2 December 1969	
Republic of Moldova	12 August 1996	
Mongolia	3 June 1969	
Montenegro	3 June 2006	
Morocco	20 May 1957	
Mozambique	23 December 1996	
Namibia	3 January 1995	
Nepal	11 November 1996	
Netherlands	22 December 1993	Ratification excludes Aruba, Curaçao, Sint Maarten and the Caribbean Netherlands.
New Zealand	9 June 2003	
Nicaragua	31 October 1967	
Niger	23 March 1962	
Nigeria	17 October 1960	
Norway	17 February 1955	
Pakistan	26 May 1952	
Panama	16 May 1966	
Papua New Guinea	1 May 1976	
Paraguay	21 March 1966	
Peru	13 March 1964	
Philippines	12 December 1953	
Poland	25 February 1957	
Portugal	1 July 1964	
Romania	26 November 1958	
Russian Federation	10 August 1956	ratified as the Soviet Union
Rwanda	11 August 1988	
Saint Kitts and Nevis	4 September 2000	
Saint Lucia	14 May 1980	
Saint Vincent and the Grenadines	21 October 1998	
Samoa	30 June 2008	
San Marino	19 December 1986	
São Tomé and Príncipe	17 June 1992	
Senegal	28 July 1961	
Serbia	24 November 2000	ratified as Serbia and Montenegro
Seychelles	4 October 1999	
Sierra Leone	13 June 1961	
Singapore	25 October 1965	
Slovakia	1 January 1993	
Slovenia	29 May 1992	
Solomon Islands	13 April 2012	
Somalia	22 March 2014	
South Africa	19 February 1996	
South Sudan	29 April 2012	
Spain	20 April 1977	
Sri Lanka	13 December 1972	
Sudan	18 June 1957	
Suriname	5 June 1996	
Swaziland	26 April 1978	
Sweden	18 July 1950	
Switzerland	17 August 1999	
Syria	7 June 1957	
Tajikistan	26 November 1993	
Tanzania	30 January 1962	ratified as Tanganyika
Timor Leste	16 June 2009	
Togo	8 November 1983	
Trinidad and Tobago	24 May 1963	
Tunisia	15 May 1957	
Turkey	23 January 1952	
Turkmenistan	15 May 1997	
Uganda	4 June 1963	
Ukraine	14 September 1956	ratified as the Ukrainian SSR
United Kingdom	30 June 1950	
Uruguay	18 March 1954	
Uzbekistan	13 July 1992	
Vanuatu	28 August 2006	
Venezuela	19 December 1968	
Vietnam	5 July 2019	
Yemen	14 April 1969	ratified as South Yemen
Zambia	2 September 1996	
Zimbabwe	27 August 1998	

== See also ==
- Freedom of assembly
- Freedom of association
- Right to Strike under ILO Convention No. 87
