= Achoja Blessing =

Nigerian politician

Achoja Blessing is a Nigerian politician. He currently serves as the State Representatives representing Ethiope West constituency at the Delta State House of Assembly.
