= Meiram Qajyken =

Professor, presidential candidate, economist

- Мейрам Қажыкен

Leader of Yntymaq
- Incumbent
- Assumed office 19 April 2022
- Preceded by: Office established

Personal details
- Born: 5 April 1961 (age 65) Qyzyl Qūrma, Kazakh SSR, Soviet Union
- Party: Yntymaq (2022–present)
- Other political affiliations: AKD (2022)
- Spouse: Ainagül Süleimenova
- Children: 3
- Occupation: Professor, economist

Military service
- Allegiance: Kazakhstan
- Branch/service: Armed Forces of the Republic of Kazakhstan
- Rank: Reservist

Meiram Zekeshuly Qajyken (Kazakh: Мейрам Зекешұлы Қажыкен, romanized: Meiram Zekeşuly Qajyken; born 5 April 1961) is a Kazakh economist and academician who is the leader of Yntymaq party from 2022 and the head of Modern Society Studies Institute since 2015. Prior to that, he worked in the Federation of Trade Unions of Kazakhstan, as well as various state-owned enterprises and government departments related to economy and industry in Kazakhstan. Qajyken is Doctor of Economics and an author of several books written on the development of the socio-economic system, adaptive economy and the concept of a unified wage system in Kazakhstan. He is chairman of several state-owned enterprises and is a professor at the Astana International University.

Qajyken is an "Amanat" Commonwealth of Trade Union presidential candidate for the 2022 presidential election.

== Biography ==
=== Early life and education ===
Qajyken was born in the village of Qyzyl Qūrma in Pavlodar Region. He attended the Dzhambul Irrigation and Construction Institute from 1977 where he graduated in 1982 with a degree in hydraulic engineering. From 1988 to 1990, he studied at the Moscow State Hydroreclamation Institute graduate school and then later at the National Higher School of Public Administration under the President from 1997 where he received a specialty in public administration. After obtaining the specialty, Qajyken attended short courses in macroeconomics abroad in South Korea, Japan, United Kingdom, Italy, and the United States until 2005.

=== Career ===
Qajyken began his career in March 1992 as a chief specialist and the head of the Department of Economy in Pavlodar Region. From May 1994, he served as an advisor to the Akim of Pavlodar Region and deputy head of the Department of Economics and Finance in the region. From April 1996 to August 1997, Qajyken worked as the regional deputy head of the Department of Industry until being appointed as the head and deputy head for Kazakhstan's Department of the Agency for Strategic Planning and Reforms, in which the post was transformed into the head of the Department of the Ministry of Economy in October 1999.

From April 2000, Qajyken was the head of the project implementation group and director of the Department of the Ministry of Transport and Communications until December 2001. He returned to Pavlodar Region in January 2002 to lead the regional Department of Economy where he worked until June 2003, when he was appointed as an adviser to Prime Minister Daniyal Akhmetov and the head of the Department of Production Sphere and Infrastructure under the Prime Minister's Office. In November 2005, Qajyken became the chairman of the committee for Industry, Scientific and Technological Development under the Ministry of Industry and Trade.

From June 2007, Qajyken worked in various state-owned enterprises of "KAZNEX" Corporation for Development and Export Promotion and Kazakhstan Institute for Industry Development.

Qajyken since November 2011 has headed a number of institutes and served as an adviser to the Prime Minister. Since January 2015, Qajyken has been served as the director of the Institute for Contemporary Society Studies and while during his tenure, he worked alongside as the director of the Center for Research Training and Conflict Resolution under the Federation of Trade Unions of Kazakhstan from June 2015 to August 2018.

=== Leader of Yntymaq (2022–present) ===
On 19 April 2022, the creation of the Yntymaq party was announced by its initiative group led by Qajyken himself, which previously acted as a coordinating council under the Yntymag Institute for Payment and Social Partnership. The coordinating council included several trade unions and branch associations with Qajyken, in a May 2022 interview to Vlast, announcing that the initiative group would send documents to the Ministry of Justice for registration, adding that it was "not in a hurry". Qayken explained the reasoning in creation of the party was due to the 2022 Kazakh unrest in which he described it as the "splitting of society" with a need in preserving it and that the Yntymaq would aim at developing a strong civil society in Kazakhstan.

=== 2022 presidential campaign ===
On 26 September 2022, Qajyken in an interview with Vlast, announced his interest to run for the 2022 presidential elections, in which he noted that the decision in nominating him would be up to the "business of the association itself". From there, it was speculated that Qajyken would be nominated by one of the trade union associations with political scientist Andrey Chebotarev suggesting it being the Federation of Trade Unions of Kazakhstan, which previously nominated Amangeldi Taspihov for the 2019 election. On 3 October 2022, it was reported that the "Amanat" Commonwealth of Trade Unions (AKD) had nominated Qajyken for presidency who later confirmed the news, stating that the decision by the AKD was initially made in a previous week following a joint meeting of the association's central and executive committee on 28 September, with Qajyken expressed confidence on his election victory.

== Bibliography ==
- Theory of sustainability of the socio-economic system (Теория устойчивости социально-экономической системы) (2000, 2003)
