= Elizabeth G. Ferris =

Elizabeth G. Ferris (born c. 1950) is a senior fellow in the Foreign Policy Studies Program at the Brookings Institution in Washington, D.C. and serves as the co-director of the Brookings-LSE Project on Internal Displacement. In addition to her positions within the Brookings Institution, Ferris is an adjunct associate professor at Georgetown University’s School of Foreign Service. She is also commissioner of the Women's Refugee Commission, a distinguished author and a lifelong humanitarian.

== Education ==
She received her B.A. in History from Duke University, graduating in 1971 magna cum laude. In 1972, she received her M.A. in Latin American Studies from the University of Florida. In 1976, Ferris received her Ph.D. in Political Science from the University of Florida, specializing in International Relations and Latin American Studies.

== Career ==
=== Research ===
Ferris’ work encompasses a wide range of issues related to human rights, forced migration, humanitarian action, the role of civil society in protecting displaced populations and the security implications of displacement. In her latest book, The Politics of Protection: The Limits of Humanitarian Action(Brookings, 2011), Ferris examines inconsistent ways in which protection is defined and applied. She argues that the protection paradigms currently in use are inadequate to meet the challenges of the future, such as climate change, protracted displacement, and the changing nature of warfare.

Ferris has written many articles on humanitarian and human rights issues that have been published in both academic and policy journals. Notable publications for which she has written include Refugee Survey Quarterly, The Washington Post, The Washington Times, the International Review of the Red Cross and Red Crescent Societies, the Middle East Institute’s Viewpoints series, Forced Migration Review and New Routes, Signs: Journal of Women in Culture and Society. She has also written book chapters, reviews and papers for a number of other publications and organizations and has spoken extensively on forced migration and human rights issues for such groups as the United Nations High Commissioner for Refugees, the World Assembly of the World Alliance of YMCAs and the Senate Judiciary Committee of the US Congress.

=== Brookings-LSE Project on Internal Displacement ===
The Brookings-LSE Project on Internal Displacement, established in 1994, is co-directed by Ferris and Chaloka Beyani, the current UN Special Rapporteur on the Human Rights of Internally Displaced Persons. The goal of the project is to develop global and regional normative standards on internal displacement, to support governments, civil society and international actors in their work with internally displaced persons, and to carry out independent research on situations of internal displacement.

=== Other work ===
Prior to joining the Brookings Institution in November 2006, Ferris spent 20 years working in the field of humanitarian assistance. Most recently, she worked in humanitarian response and long-term development for the World Council of Churches in Geneva, Switzerland. Ferris served as the Director of the Church World Service’s Immigration and Refugee Program and the Research Director for the Life & Peace Institute in Uppsala, Sweden. She also served as chair of the International Council of Voluntary Agencies from 2003-2006 and, in that capacity, was an active participant in the Inter-Agency Standing Committee. She has been a professor at several US universities, including Lafayette College, Miami University and Pembroke State University, and served as a Fulbright Professor at the Universidad Nacional Autónoma de México.

== Personal life ==
She is married to Barry Childers, clinical psychologist, and they have two children: Jon Ferris and Sara Ferris-Childers.

== Selected bibliography ==
- The Politics of Protection: The Limits of Humanitarian Action. Washington, DC: Brookings Institution Press, 2011.
- Uprooted: Refugees and Forced Migrants. New York: Friendship Press, 1998.
- Beyond Borders: Refugees, Migrants and Human Rights in the Post-Cold War Era. Geneva: World Council of Churches, 1993.
- The Central American Refugees. New York: Praeger, 1987.
- Refugees in World Politics. Edited. New York: Praeger, 1985.
- The Dynamics of Latin American Foreign Policies: Challenges for the 1980s. Edited with Jennie K. Lincoln. Boulder: Westview Press, 1984.
- Latin American Foreign Policies: Global and Regional Dimensions. Edited with Jennie K. Lincoln. Boulder: Westview Press, 1981.

== See also ==
- Women’s Refugee Commission
- The Brookings Institution
- World Council of Churches
- ACT Alliance
