= "Amanat" Commonwealth of Trade Unions =

Trade union in Kazakhstan

- «Аманат» кәсіподақтар достастығы
- Founded: 2017
- Headquarters: 25 Aleksandr Baraev St., Apt. 19
- Location: Astana, Kazakhstan
- Key people: Andrei Prigor, head
- Affiliations: World Federation of Trade Unions

The "Amanat" Commonwealth of Trade Unions (Kazakh: «Аманат» кәсіподақтар достастығы, romanized: "Amanat" käsıpodaqtar dostastyğy, Amanat KD; Russian: Содружество профсоюзов «Аманат», romanized: Sodruzhestvo profsoyuzov "Amanat", SPA) is a national trade union centre in Kazakhstan that was established on 7 June 2017 following the liquidation of the Confederation of Independent Trade Unions of Kazakhstan in late 2016 by the Kazakh government. According to leader Andrei Prigor, the AKD was formed as an alternative to the established trade unions in Kazakhstan addressing labour disputes with an intent of balancing worker relations. It also seeks to change the Labour Code of Kazakhstan to more compliant within the framework of the existing Civil Code.

== History ==
In 2016, the "Amanat" Commonwealth of Trade Unions (AKD) began the process of formation to which at that time saw the Confederation of Independent Trade Unions of Kazakhstan along with its affiliated organisations being liquated by the Ministry of Justice due to restrictive laws on labour unions. After being officially registered on 5 May 2017, the AKD held a following press conference in Almaty on its establishment and registration on 7 June 2017, with the leader Andrei Prigor addressing the subsequent government pressure on trade unions, saying that the AKD had managed to obtain registration possibly due to criticism by the international organisation towards Kazakh authorities. Prigor remarked about labour strikes and lack of bridge between workers and employers, criticising the existing trade unions for not doing enough job to resolve labour disputes and that the AKD would attempt at bring "relations into balance within the framework of law and justice" by carrying out active work across Kazakhstan.

By March 2018, 300,000 members of second largest branch of the trade unions of doctors had joined AKD. in November 2018, it was announced that the AKD had become a member of the World Federation of Trade Unions.

At a joint meeting of the AKD's central and executive committee held 28 September 2022, the trade union nominated Meiram Qajyken as its candidate for the 2022 presidential elections, in which the news of the nomination was made public with Qajyken's confirmation a week later on 3 October.

== Election results ==
=== Presidential ===
Election year	Candidate	First round			Second round			Result
Election year	Candidate	Votes	%	Rank	Votes	%	Rank	Result
2022	Meiram Qajyken	200,907	2.53	4th	—N/a			Lost ✗
