= Ferguson Onwo =

Nigerian politician

Ferguson Onwo is a Nigerian politician. He currently serves as the State Representatives representing Isoko South II constituency at the Delta State House of Assembly.
