= Walter Kälin =

Swiss lawyer and activist

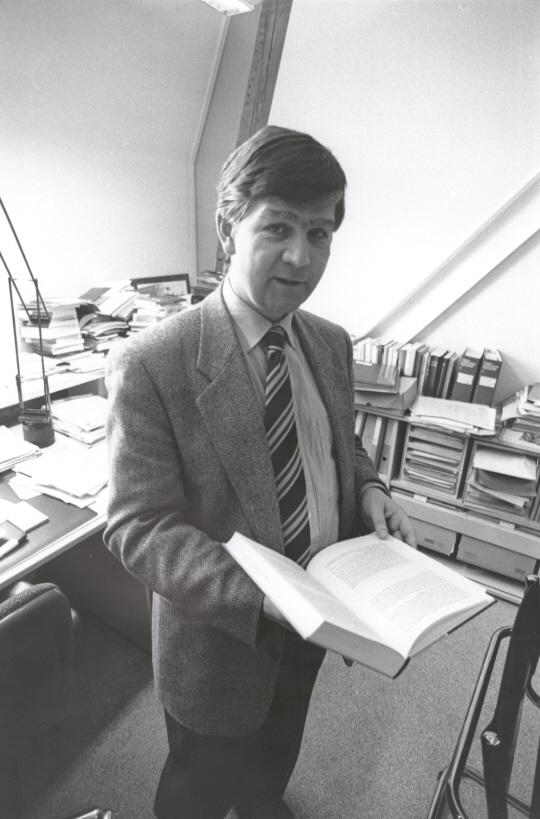
- Born: 20 May 1951 (age 75); Zurich, Switzerland
- Education: University of Bern, (Dr. iur.); Harvard Law School, (LL.M.)
- Occupations: Lawyer, Professor, Humanitarian, Politician
- Title: Representative of the United Nations Secretary-General on the Human Rights of Internally Displaced Persons (since September 2004)

Walter Kälin (born 20 May 1951) is a Swiss humanitarian, constitutional lawyer, international human rights lawyer, activist, and advocate. He is also known as a legal scholar and a renowned professor. He has been a leader in changing Swiss laws and international laws for humanitarian purposes and he has been published extensively on issues of human rights law, the law of internally displaced persons, refugee law, and Swiss constitutional law.

== Early life and education ==
Walter Kälin received his Doctor of Law from the University of Bern and his LL.M. from Harvard Law School.

== Career ==
Kälin has been a professor of international and constitutional law at the University of Bern since 1985. He is also a former Dean of the Faculty and Head of the Legal Department.

He has acted as a consultant for numerous agencies and organizations – including the Swiss development agency, SDC, UNHCR, UNHCHR, UNDP, and others – on matters of decentralization, human rights, and refugee law. He was notably counselling and representing asylum-seekers as a member of the Swiss section of Amnesty International.

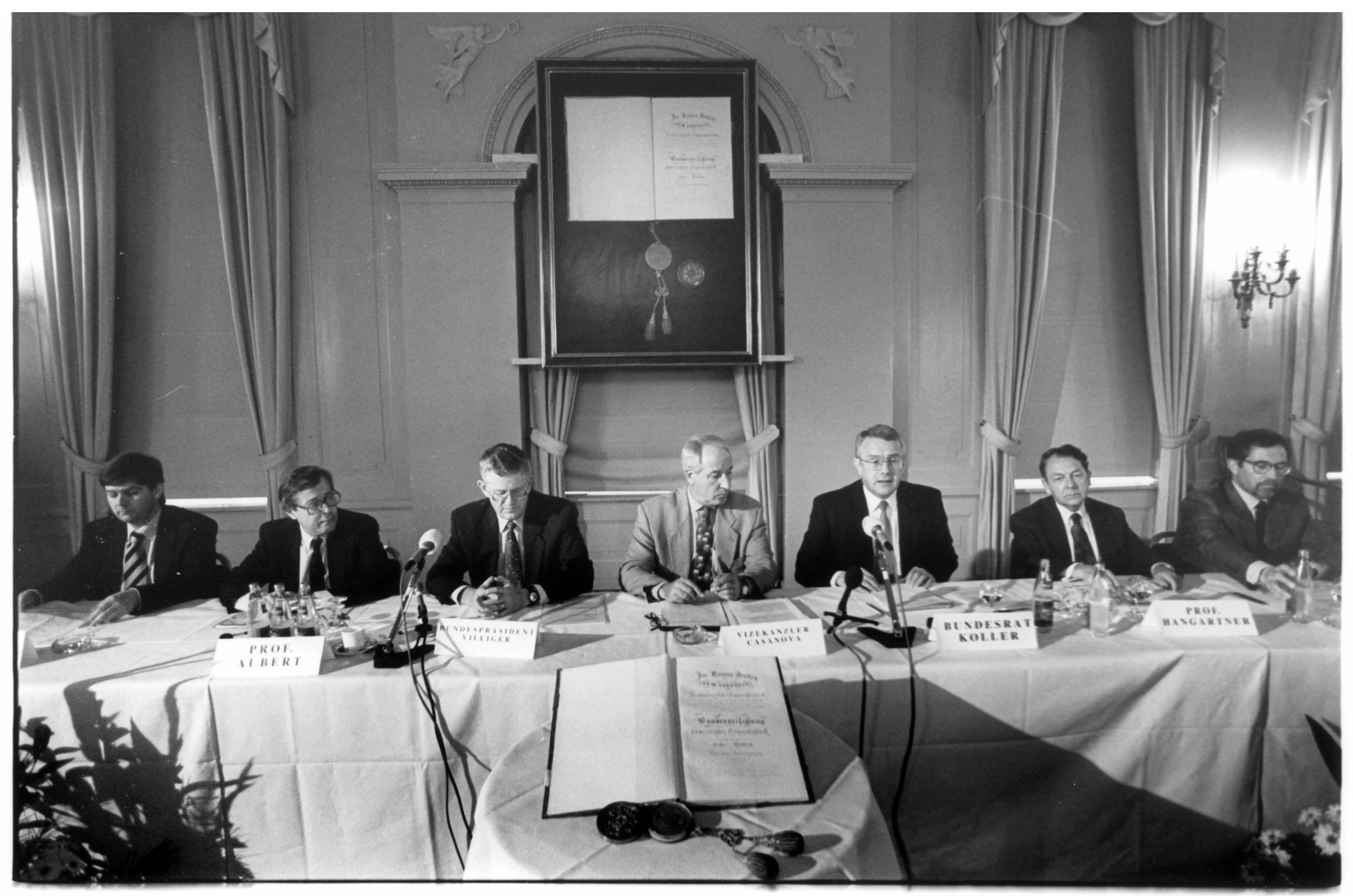
Walter Kälin (on the left) at a press conference for the preparation of Swiss constitutional reform (1995)

In 1991–1992, Kälin served as the Special Rapporteur of the Commission on Human Rights on the situation of human rights in Kuwait under Iraqi Occupation. He was also a member of the Swiss government's Steering Committee for "the preparation of constitutional reform" and he was chairman for the preparation of the reform of the judiciary (1995–1996).

Since 2011, Kälin has been a member of the Human Rights Committee of the United Nations.

Since 2004, Kälin has served as the Representative of the United Nations' Secretary-General on the Human Rights of Internally Displaced Persons.

He served as a board member of the International Service for Human Rights in Geneva from 2010 to 2013.

He also served as the Envoy of the Chairmanship of the Nansen Initiative between 2011 and 2016, which lead to the creation of the Platform on Disaster Displacement.

Since spring 2017, Kälin has been serving on the board of directors of the Norwegian Refugee Council. In 2019, United Nations Secretary-General António Guterres appointed him to the Expert Advisory Group of the High Level-Panel on Internal Displacement under the leadership of Federica Mogherini and Donald Kaberuka.

== Published work ==
- Kälin, Walter; Müller, Lars; Wyttenbach, Judith (2004). The Face of Human Rights. Italy: Lars Müller Publications. ISBN 3-03778-017-7
- Kälin, Walter; Kunzli, Jorg (July 2009). The Law of International Human Rights Protection. USA: Oxford University Press. ISBN 978-0-19-956520-7
- Kälin, Walter; Epiney, Astrid; Heim, Lukas; Felder, Andreas (January 2003). Zum öffentlichen Recht : Völkerrecht. Switzerland: Stämpfli Verlag. ISBN 978-3-7272-1508-7

== Lectures ==
- Climate Change and Population Movements in the Lecture Series of the United Nations Audiovisual Library of International Law
- Climate Change and Population Movements in the Lecture Series of the United Nations Audiovisual Library of International Law

== See also ==
- Office of the High Commissioner for Human Rights
- International Human Rights Law
