= Christopher Greenwood =

British judge (born 1955)

Sir Christopher Greenwood GBE CMG KC
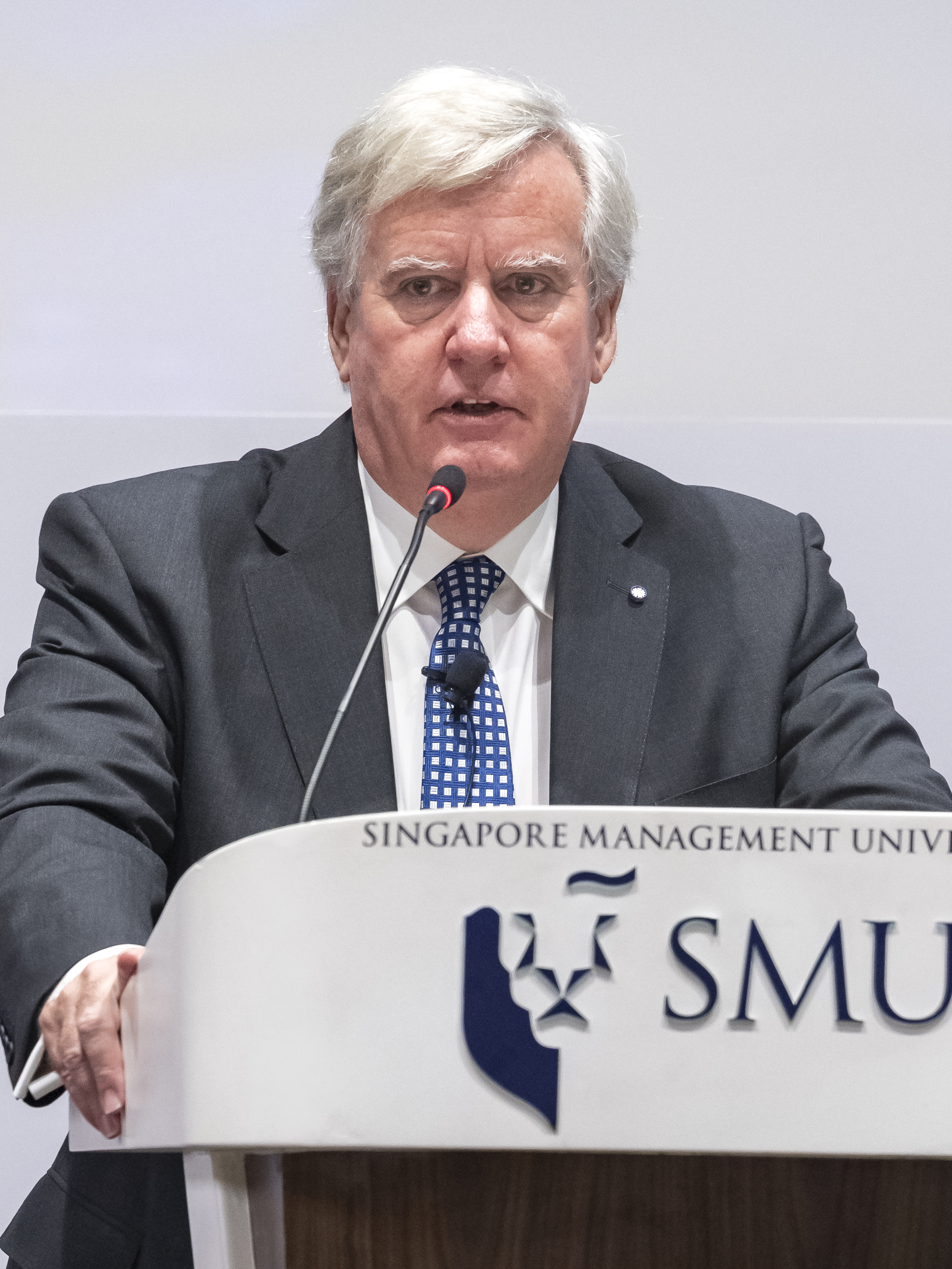
- Greenwood in 2018

Master of Magdalene College, Cambridge
- Incumbent
- Assumed office October 2020
- Preceded by: Rowan Williams

Judge of the International Court of Justice
- In office 2009–2018
- Preceded by: Rosalyn Higgins, Baroness Higgins
- Succeeded by: Nawaf Salam

Personal details
- Born: 12 May 1955 (age 71) Wellingborough, England
- Education: Magdalene College, Cambridge
- Occupation: Barrister and arbitrator

Sir Christopher John Greenwood (born 12 May 1955) is Master of Magdalene College, Cambridge, an arbitrator of international disputes, and a former British judge at the International Court of Justice. Prior to his election, he was professor of international law at the London School of Economics and a barrister who regularly appeared as counsel before the International Court of Justice, the European Court of Human Rights, the English courts, and other tribunals.

== Family and career ==
Greenwood is the son of Captain Murray Greenwood RN and Diana Greenwood. He attended Wellingborough School. In 1976, he took a first in law from Magdalene College, Cambridge; in 1977, a first in International Law; (Note: The LLB degree at Cambridge has since been renamed as the LLM to clearly reflect it being a Master's degree. By contrast, Oxford's Bachelor of Civil Law degree (BCL) retains the traditional name.) MA in 1981. In 1976, he was president of the Cambridge Union. He is married with two daughters.

He was called to the bar at the Middle Temple in 1978 and was appointed Queen's Counsel in 1999. In 2002 he was appointed Companion of the Order of St Michael and St George (CMG) in the Queen's Birthday Honours for services to international law. He was knighted in the 2009 New Year Honours. In 2018 Queen's Birthday Honours, he was appointed Knight Grand Cross of the Order of the British Empire (GBE) for services to international justice.

Greenwood is a member of the Panel of Arbitrators for the Law of the Sea Treaty, the International Centre for Settlement of Investment Disputes, and the United Kingdom National Group at the Permanent Court of Arbitration.

He became Master of Magdalene College, Cambridge, on 1 October 2020, succeeding Rowan Williams.

== The Legality of Using Force Against Iraq ==
Greenwood is well known for the October 2002 legal opinion tendered to the British government, entitled The Legality of Using Force Against Iraq. His legal opinion, in which Greenwood was instructed in his capacity as a QC, has been used to justify that the invasion by Britain, the United States and allied powers was sanctioned by the UN Security Council. However, the opinion was concluded in the month before the adoption of United Nations Security Council Resolution 1441 and the conclusion was stated to be dependent on one of three conditions being satisfied. These conditions (he said) were (1) "if the UN Security Council adopts a fresh resolution authorising military action against Iraq and any conditions set out in that resolution are met" – this did not happen; or (2) "under existing Security Council resolutions on the basis that the Security Council considered that (a) Iraq is in material breach of those resolutions" and (b) "that breach constitutes a threat to international peace and security in the Gulf area. This would not require a fresh Security Council authorisation of military action".

The question of whether these conditions were satisfied is controversial and unclear, since there was no further resolution which might have rendered the point clear. Alternatively, (3) "under the right of self-defence if an armed attack by Iraq against the United Kingdom or one of its allies was reasonably believed to be imminent. This would not require any action by the Security Council."

Greenwood acted as counsel for the government of the United Kingdom in relation to a number of cases in both domestic and international courts: the Ojdanic case in the International Criminal Tribunal for the Former Yugoslavia; Federal Republic of Yugoslavia v. United Kingdom in the International Court of Justice; the General Assembly request to the ICJ for an advisory opinion on the Palestinian wall (UK observations on admissibility); R (on the application of the European Roma Rights Centre and others) v. Immigration Officer at Prague Airport and others; and R (on the application of Abbasi and Mubanga) v. the Secretary of State for Foreign and Commonwealth Affairs and others.

Notable appearances include:

- Libya v. United Kingdom (Aerial Incident at Lockerbie) ICJ Reps., 1992, p. 3; ICJ Reps. 1998, p. 3
- Case concerning Legality of Use of Force (Yugoslavia v. United Kingdom) ICJ Reps, 1999
- R. v. Bow Street Magistrates, ex parte Pinochet (No. 1) [2000] 1 AC 147, [1998] 3 WLR 1456 and (No. 3) [2001] 1 AC 147, [1999] 2 WLR 827 [1999] 1 WLR 188 (Court of Appeal)

The Globe and Mail reported on 31 August 2007 that Greenwood had been hired by the Canadian Department of National Defence for an opinion on the Canadian Afghan detainee issue, the responsibility Canada had for captives apprehended in Afghanistan. The legal issue is whether Canada can use the United Nations mandate to override its international treaty obligations.

== Judge at the International Court of Justice ==
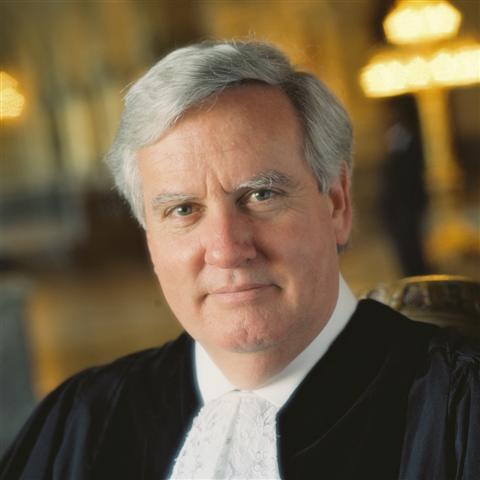
Greenwood in 2009

Greenwood was elected as a judge of the International Court of Justice in November 2008 and served from 2009 to 2018. Greenwood's direct predecessor as a judge from the United Kingdom was Rosalyn Higgins and, although there is no rule allocating seats, the one held by them was kept by judges from the UK since the founding of the ICJ in 1946.

In November 2017, the seats of Greenwood and four other judges were up for election. Nawaf Salam from Lebanon surprisingly contested and won the seat kept previously by Indian judge Dalveer Bhandari. India in turn had Bhandari contest the seat previously held by Greenwood and after multiple rounds of voting the United Kingdom decided to withdraw Greenwood's application. This is the second time a permanent member of the United Nations Security Council has no judge on the ICJ and first time a permanent member lost the majority vote in the UN general assembly.

== Lectures ==
- The Relationship between International Law and Municipal Law in the Lecture Series of the United Nations Audiovisual Library of International Law
- The Sources of International Law in the Lecture Series of the United Nations Audiovisual Library of International Law
- State Jurisdiction in the Lecture Series of the United Nations Audiovisual Library of International Law
- Immunities from Jurisdiction in the Lecture Series of the United Nations Audiovisual Library of International Law
- Immunities of the Head of State Under International Law in the Lecture Series of the United Nations Audiovisual Library of International Law
- Reflections on the Right of Self-Defence in International Law in the Lecture Series of the United Nations Audiovisual Library of International Law
- Introduction to International Humanitarian Law in the Lecture Series of the United Nations Audiovisual Library of International Law
- International Law in the Age of Adjudication in the Lecture Series of the United Nations Audiovisual Library of International Law
