= Preyor Oboro =

Nigerian politician

Preyor Oboro is a Nigerian politician. He currently serves as the State Representatives representing Bomadi constituency at the Delta State House of Assembly.
