= Emomotimi Guwor =

Nigerian politician

The Right Honourable Rt. Hon. Emomotimi Guwor

Speaker, Delta State House of Assembly
- Incumbent
- Assumed office 13 June 2023
- Constituency: Warri South West State Constituency

Emomotimi Guwor is a Nigerian politician who serves as Speaker Delta State House of Assembly since June 2023 representing Warri South West State on platform of the Peoples Democratic Party.

== Early life and education ==
Emomotimi Guwor was born in Delta State, Nigeria. He attended Fiyewei Primary School, Oporoza, Essi College, Warri, and Gbaraun Grammar School. He later obtained a bachelor's degree in Geology from Delta State University, Abraka and a master's degree in Petroleum Geology from the same university.

== Career ==
Emomotimi Guwor became a member of the Delta State House of Assembly in the year 2019 after winning the March 9, 2019 general elections to represent Warri South West Constituency in the Delta State House of Assembly polling a total votes of 131,469 defeating his opponent Comrade Eyengho Besidone of the All Progressive Congress (APC).

He was re-elected for the second term into the house after his landslide victory at March 18, 2023 State House of Assembly Elections for Warri South West State Constituency, polling a total of 7,932 votes defeating his opponent Deacon Tekedor Pinasine Clement of the All Progressive Congress (APC) who polled 3,016 votes of the total valid votes cast.
