= Marilyn Okowa-Daramola =

Nigerian politician

Hon. Marilyn Okowa-Daramola

Member of the Delta State House of Assembly
- Incumbent
- Assumed office 13 June 2023
- Governor: Sheriff Oborevwori
- Constituency: Ika North East

Personal details
- Born: Marilyn Dumkelechukwu Okowa-Daramola
- Education: University of Nottingham; Lancaster University
- Occupation: Lawyer, politician
- Known for: Member of the Delta State House of Assembly

Marilyn Okowa-Daramola is a Nigerian politician. She currently serves as the State Representatives representing Ika North East constituency at the Delta State House of Assembly.

== Early life and education ==
Okowa-Daramola studied law at the University of Nottingham in the United Kingdom, where she obtained a bachelor's degree in law in 2010. She later attended Lancaster University, where she obtained a master's degree in law with distinction in 2013.

== career ==
Before entering politics, Okowa-Daramola worked as a lawyer. She worked as an associate in law firms in Nigeria before joining the Central Bank of Nigeria, where she served as an Assistant Legal Officer between 2014 and 2018.

== Public service ==
Okowa-Daramola began her public service career in the Delta State Government in 2019 when she was appointed Senior Special Assistant to the Governor on Girl Child Empowerment. She headed the Girl Child Empowerment Office from July 2019 to March 2022.

== Political career ==
Okowa-Daramola contested for the Ika North East State Constituency seat in the 2023 Delta State House of Assembly election on the platform of the PDP. She was elected to the Delta State House of Assembly in March 2023.
