= Tonobok Okowa =

Tonobok Okowa is a Nigerian sports administrator. He serves as the president of the Athletics Federation of Nigeria (AFN) and as the vice president of the Confederation of African Athletics (CAA).
