= Mahmoud Daifallah Hmoud =

Jordanian diplomat and judge

Judge of the International Court of Justice
- Incumbent
- Assumed office 27 May 2025
- Preceded by: Nawaf Salam

Member of the United Nations International Law Commission
- In office 2007–2022

Personal details
- Education: University of Jordan, George Washington University, Lund University, University of New Hampshire School of Law
- Occupation: Lawyer, diplomat

Mahmoud Daifallah Hmoud is a Jordanian jurist and former diplomat who has served as a judge of the International Court of Justice (ICJ) since May 2025. He previously served as Jordan's Permanent Representative to the United Nations from 2021 to 2025 and as a member of the International Law Commission (ILC) from 2007 to 2022, chairing the Commission in 2021.

On 27 May 2025, Hmoud was elected to the ICJ to complete the term of Judge Nawaf Salam, who had resigned earlier that year. On 3 November 2026, he was re-elected for a full nine-year term commencing on 6 February 2027.

== Education ==
Hmoud graduated from the University of Jordan with a bachelor's degree in law in 1992. He obtained a Master of Laws (LLM) degree from the George Washington University Law School in 1993, followed by a diploma in international human rights from the Raoul Wallenberg Institute at Lund University in Sweden in 1996. In 1998, he obtained a second LLM from the Franklin Pierce Law Center (now the University of New Hampshire School of Law).

He completed the requirements for legal training with the Jordanian Bar Association in July 1994.

== Diplomatic career ==
Hmoud began his career as a legal adviser to the office of Prince Hassan bin Talal of Jordan, serving from 1994 to 1999. He subsequently held several appointments as legal adviser and director of the Legal Department of Jordan's Ministry of Foreign Affairs and Expatriates between 1999 and 2018.

From 2001 to 2006, Hmoud served as a diplomat and legal adviser at Jordan's Permanent Mission to the United Nations in New York. During the sixtieth session of the United Nations General Assembly, he served as Vice-Chair of its Sixth Committee (Legal).

Between 2010 and 2013, he was Deputy Chief of Mission at the Jordanian Embassy in Washington, D.C. He subsequently served as Senior Deputy Permanent Representative of Jordan to the United Nations from 2013 to 2015, including during Jordan's membership of the United Nations Security Council in 2014–2015.

Hmoud was appointed Jordan's Ambassador to Singapore in 2018, serving until 2021. He was concurrently accredited as non-resident Ambassador to Vietnam from 2020 to 2021.

In August 2021, Hmoud became Jordan's Permanent Representative to the United Nations in New York, a position he held until May 2025. During this period, he also served as non-resident Ambassador to Cuba (2023–2025) and the Dominican Republic (2023–2025).

== International litigation ==
Hmoud represented Jordan as legal counsel in proceedings before international courts and tribunals, including the International Court of Justice, the International Criminal Court (ICC) and the International Centre for Settlement of Investment Disputes (ICSID).

Before the International Court of Justice, he served as counsel for Jordan in advisory proceedings concerning the Legal Consequences of the Construction of a Wall in the Occupied Palestinian Territory (2004), Accordance with International Law of the Unilateral Declaration of Independence in Respect of Kosovo (2010), and Legal Consequences arising from the Policies and Practices of Israel in the Occupied Palestinian Territory, including East Jerusalem (2024).

== Member of the International Law Commission ==
Hmoud was a member of the United Nations International Law Commission from 2007 to 2022, serving three consecutive terms.

During his membership, he held several leadership positions, including second vice-chair (2008), chair of the Drafting Committee (2012), first vice-chair (2019), and chair of the Working Group on the Long-Term Programme of Work (2017–2022).

In 2021, he was elected chair of the commission for its seventy-second session.

== Judge of the International Court of Justice ==
On 27 May 2025, Hmoud was elected a judge of the International Court of Justice by the United Nations General Assembly and Security Council. He succeeded Nawaf Salam of Lebanon, who had resigned from the Court on 14 January 2025 following his appointment as Prime Minister of Lebanon.

Hmoud was elected to serve the remainder of Salam's term, scheduled to expire on 5 February 2027. He made his solemn declaration as a member of the Court on 23 July 2025 at the Peace Palace in The Hague.

On 3 November 2026, Hmoud was re-elected to the Court for a full nine-year term, beginning on 6 February 2027 and ending on 5 February 2036. He obtained the required majorities in both the General Assembly and Security Council in the first round of voting.

== Selected publications ==
- "Negotiating the Draft Comprehensive Convention on International Terrorism: Major Bones of Contention", Journal of International Criminal Justice, 2006 (doi: 10.1093/jicj/mql081)
- "Are the Principles Really Needed? The Potential of the Established Distinction between Responsibility for Attacks by Non-State Actors and the Law of Self-Defence", American Journal of International Law, Vol. 107, p. 576
- "Sources of International Law", in Mario J. A. Oyarzabal (ed.), International Law for Diplomats, Brill, 2025
