= Fred Ajudua =

Nigerian lawyer

Frederick Chijindu Ajudua is a Nigerian lawyer accused of being an advance-fee fraud scammer.

Fred Ajudua, an Ibusa native, studied law and graduated from the University of Benin, Edo State. In March 1994, Newswatch Magazine published an article saying that I.G Aliyu Atta, at that time Inspector-General of Police, cancelled a meeting with senior police officers in order to receive Ajudua. Aliyu Atta sued the magazine for libel but did not succeed. In 2000 he was reported as having served five years of prison at Kirikiri and Agodi.

In October 2003, Alhaji Nuhu Ribadu, Chairman of the Nigerian Economic and Financial Crimes Commission (EFCC), said that Ajudua had twelve cases pending against him including an advance fee fraud of 1.6 million Euros and another of $1.5 million, both committed in 2001. He was accused of collecting money from Nelson Allen, a Canadian who lost $250,000. A German was said to have lost $350,000 to him. He was said to have tricked more than $1.69-million out of two Dutch nationals between 1999 and 2000. On July 26, 2005 the German woman, Frieda Springer-Beck, agreed to an out-of-court settlement after a long series of inconclusive court appearances dating back to 1993.

After his imprisonment, while awaiting trial for fraud, he was appointed to teach basic law. Ajudua was granted bail to seek medical attention in India on 3 February 2005. Hearing that he was back in Nigeria, the EFCC attempted to arrest him on 20 March 2007 at a beer parlour in Ibusa. The move was thwarted by armed thugs. The commission appealed to anyone who has information that could lead to the fugitive's arrest.

In 2007, the Administrative Panel of Inquiry on Reports of Alleged Corrupt Practices recommended that Ajudua's wife should not run for political office on the basis of an EFCC report that she had been involved in a conspiracy to obtain $7.85M and $3Million under false pretense and had used money from fraud to campaign for election, although the panel noted that there was no direct evidence linking her to the activities of her husband.
