= Dalveer Bhandari =

Indian judge (born 1947)

Justice Dalveer Bhandari
- Bhandari in 2011

Judge of the International Court of Justice
- Incumbent
- Assumed office 27 April 2012
- Preceded by: Awn Al-Khasawneh

Judge of the Supreme Court of India
- In office 28 October 2005 – 27 April 2012
- Nominated by: Ramesh Chandra Lahoti
- Appointed by: A. P. J. Abdul Kalam

Chief Justice of the Bombay High Court
- In office 24 July 2004 – 27 October 2005
- Nominated by: Ramesh Chandra Lahoti
- Appointed by: A. P. J. Abdul Kalam

Judge of the Delhi High Court
- In office 19 March 1991 – 23 July 2004
- Nominated by: Ranganath Misra
- Appointed by: Ramaswamy Venkataraman

Personal details
- Born: 1 October 1947 (age 79) Jodhpur, Rajputana Agency, Dominion of India (present–day Rajasthan, India)
- Education: Jodhpur University (BA); Northwestern University (LLM)

Dalveer Bhandari (born 1 October 1947) is an Indian jurist. He is currently one of the judges of the International Court of Justice. He is a former judge of the Supreme Court of India and former chief justice of the Bombay High Court. Bhandari was also a judge of the Delhi High Court.

== Early life and education ==
Dalveer Bhandari's father, Mahaveer Chand Bhandari, and grandfather, B.C. Bhandari, were members of the Rajasthan bar. He acquired degrees in the humanities and law from Jodhpur University and practised in the Rajasthan High Court from 1968 to 1970. In June 1970, he was invited to a six-week workshop organized by the University of Chicago on research on Indian law in Chicago on an international scholarship and subsequently on another international scholarship, he obtained a Masters of Law from Northwestern University School of Law. He worked at the Northwestern Legal Assistance Clinic and appeared in Chicago courts on behalf of litigants of that clinic. He also worked with the Centre for Research in Chicago. In June 1973, on an international fellowship, he visited Thailand, Malaysia, Indonesia, Singapore and Sri Lanka on an observational-cum-lecture tour on legal aid and clinical legal educational programmes associated with the law courts and law schools. He also worked with a United Nations project called "Delay in the Administration of Criminal Justice in India."

== Career ==
Following his return to India, he again took up a law practice in the Rajasthan High Court from 1973 to 1976. He shifted his practice to Delhi in 1977 and was a Supreme Court lawyer till his elevation to the Delhi High Court in March 1991.

As a judge in the Delhi High Court, Bhandari also chaired the Delhi High Court Legal Services Committee, the Advisory Board of Delhi State, and the Delhi chapter of the International Law Association for a number of years. He was also the Chairperson of the Advisory Board of Delhi State on the Conservation of Foreign Exchange and Prevention of Smuggling Activities Act, 1974 (COFEPOSA) and the National Security Act (NSA) for a number of years.

On 25 July 2004 he gained appointment as Chief Justice of the Bombay High Court. As the chief justice he delivered a number of judgements in various branches of the law. His judgements and orders have led to a much larger allocation of funds for malnutrition in the five most backward districts of Maharashtra. By his judgement 100, judicial officers were appointed to deal with the cases pertaining to section 138 of the Negotiable Instruments Act, 1881. He was instrumental in setting up mediation and conciliation centres all over the states of Maharashtra and Goa. He also organized an International Conference on Mediation and Conciliation in Mumbai. He ensured better infrastructural facilities, particularly for the subordinate judiciary in the states of Maharashtra and Goa. He also took keen interest in computerization, videoconferencing facilities, legal aid and legal literacy programmes. He was instrumental in setting up the Information Centre for Litigants in the Bombay High Court.

Just over a year later, on 28 October 2005, he was elevated to the Supreme Court of India. He delivered a large number of judgements while exercising the Supreme Court's jurisdiction under article 131 between the Government of India and one or more States; between the Government of India and any State or States on one side and one or more other States on the other; or between two or more States. He has also delivered a large number of judgements on comparative law, public interest litigation, constitutional law, criminal law, civil procedure code, administrative law, arbitration laws, insurance and banking and family laws. Keeping in view his landmark judgement in a divorce case, the Union of India is seriously considering his suggestion and amending the Hindu Marriage Act, 1955, incorporating irretrievable breakdown of marriage as a ground for divorce.

His various orders in the food-grains matter led to the release of a higher quantum of supply of food grains to the population living below the poverty line. His several orders in the night-shelter matter led to state governments making provision for night shelters for homeless people all over the country. His orders in the right to free and compulsory education for children matter led to availability of basic infrastructural amenities in primary and secondary schools all over the country.

He has also served as the chairman of the Supreme Court Legal Services Committee and was nominated as the Chairman of the Mediation and Conciliation Project Committee and was supervising mediation and conciliation programmes all over the country.

He was sworn in as one of the judges of the International Court of Justice on 19 June 2012.

== Case interest ==
Bhandari is notable for his interest in computerization and intellectual property law. He also has a history of promoting legal education, both to professionals and to the general public who might be litigants. He has established mediation and conciliation centers in Maharashtra and an information centre for litigants in the Bombay High Court.

== Election to the International Court of Justice ==
Bhandari was nominated by the Government of India as its official candidate in January 2012 for the post of a judge of the International Court of Justice. The vacancy arose after the resignation of Judge Awn Shawkat Al-Khasawneh from Jordan on being appointed Prime Minister. In the elections held on 27 April 2012, Bhandari secured 122 votes in the United Nations General Assembly against 58 for his rival, Florentino Feliciano, who was nominated by the Government of the Philippines.

He was re-elected for a second term on 20 November 2017 after UK's nominee Christopher Greenwood withdrew his nomination

== Awards and honours ==
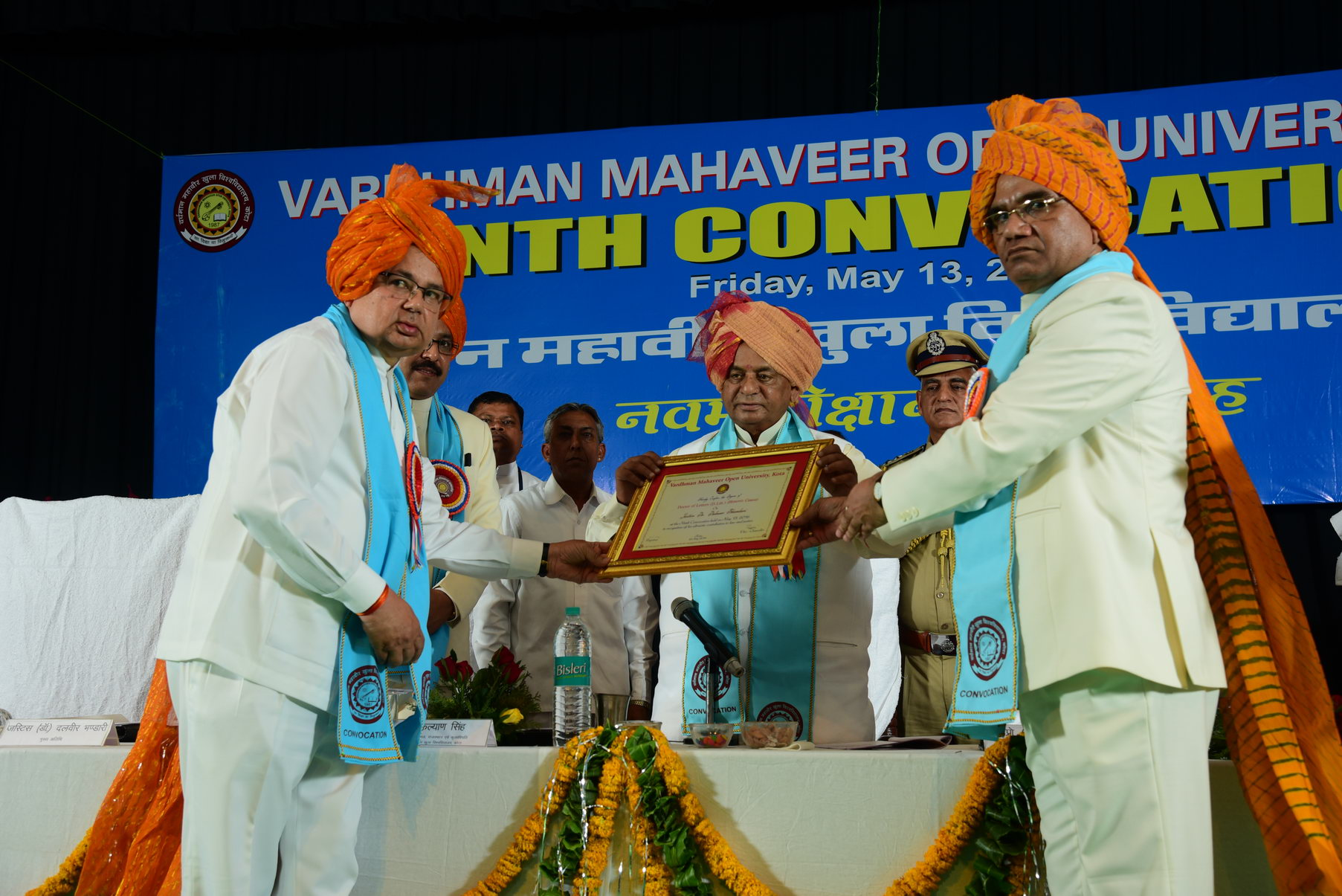
Justice Dalveer Bhandari (on the left)

- Conferred the degree of Doctor of Letters by Vardhaman Mahaveer Open University Kota in May 2016.
- In 2014, President of India conferred Bhandari with Padma Bhushan, third highest civilian award in India.
- Bhandari was selected by the Northwestern University School of Law, Chicago, United States, while celebrating its 150-year anniversary (1859-2009), his alma mater, as one of the 16 most illustrious and distinguished alumni.
- Conferred the degree of Doctor of Laws (LL.D.) by Tumkur University.
- Conferred an Honorary Doctoral Degree in International Law by The University of Cambodia
- Conferred an Honorary Doctor of Laws (L.L.D.) by The School of Law, KIIT University.
- Tumkur University, Karnataka, conferred the degree of Doctor of Laws (LL.D.) on Justice Bhandari for his magnanimous contribution to law and justice.
