= Delta State House of Assembly =

Legislative arm of Delta State in Nigeria

Type
- Type: Unicameral

History
- Founded: 1991
- New session started: 2023

Leadership
- Speaker of the Assembly: The Right Honorable Emomotimi Guwor (Warri South West Constituency), PDP
- Deputy Speaker: The Right Honorable Arthur Akpovwovwo (Ethiope-East Constituency), PDP
- Majority leader: Emeka Nwaobi (Aniocha North Constituency), PDP
- Minority leader: Edafe Emakpor (Uvwie Constituency), APC
- Chief Whip: Perkins Umukoro (Sapele Constituency), PDP
- Clerk of the House of Assembly: Mrs Lyna Ocholor

Structure
- Seats: 29
- Political groups: Peoples Democratic Party (22); All Progressives Congress (7)
- Length of term: 4 years

Elections
- Voting system: first past the post
- Last election: 18 March 2023
- Next election: February 2027

Meeting place
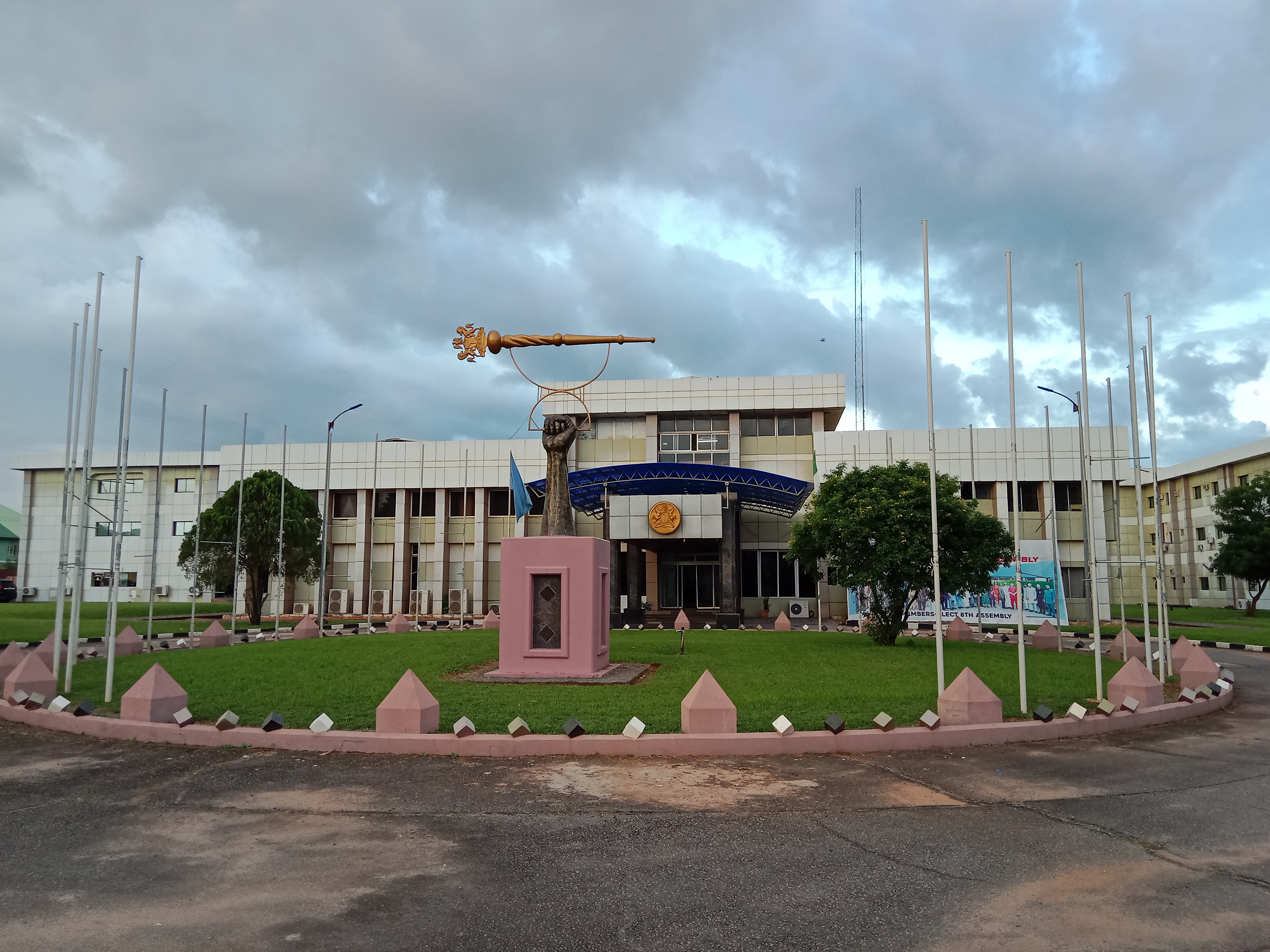
- House of Assembly, Okpanam Road, Asaba

Website
- https://deltastate.gov.ng/portfolio/legislator/

The Delta State House of Assembly is the state legislature of Delta State. It is situated along Okpanam road, in the state capital, Asaba. The Delta State House of Assembly is currently under the rulership of All Progressive Congress (APC), which has been the first time since 1999.This happened after speaker Rt. Hon. Emomotimi Guwor and 21 other law makers officially defected from the Peoples Democratic Party (PDP), which was the ruling party since 1999 to the All Progressive Congress (APC) in may 2025, turning the assembly to an All Progressive Congress (APC) controlled legislature.

There have been eight different assemblies, with the first one inaugurated in 1991 during the administration of Olorogun Felix Ibru, which later came to an end in 1992. The current and eight assembly was inaugurated on 13 June 2023, with Emomotimi Guwor emerging the speaker.

== Leadership ==
The speaker of the house is Rt Hon Emomotimi Guwor, who is the member representing Warri South West constituency. The deputy speaker is Arthur Akpovwovwo, who was elected alongside the speaker.

== Members ==
The Delta State House of Assembly consists of 29 elected representatives from each constituency

Constituency	Representatives
Aniocha North	Emeka Nwaobi
Aniocha South	Isaac Anwuzia
Bomadi	Oboro Preyor
Burutu 1	Anthony Alapala
Burutu 2	Pereotu Oloye
Ethiope East	Arthur Akpowhowho (Deputy Speaker)
Ethiope West	Blessing Achoja
Ika North East	Marilyn Okowa-Daramola
Ika South	Festus Okoh
Isoko North	Bernard Odior
Isoko South 1	Bino Obowomano
Isoko South 2	Ferguson Onwo
Ndokwa East	Prince Emeka Osamuta
Ndokwa West	Charles Emetulu
Okpe	James Augoye
Oshimili North	Frank Esenwah
Oshimili South	Bridget Anyafulu
Patani	Emmanuel Sinebe
Sapele	Perkins Umukoro
Udu	Collins Egbetamah
Ughelli North 1	Mathew Omonade
Ughelli North 2	Spencer Ohwofa
Ughelli South	Festus Utuama
Ukwuani	Chukwudi Dafe
Uvwie	Edafe Emakpor
Warri North	Fred Martins
Warri South 1	Austin Uroye
Warri South 2	Benson Obire
Warri South West	Emomotimi Guwor (Speaker)

== Gallery ==
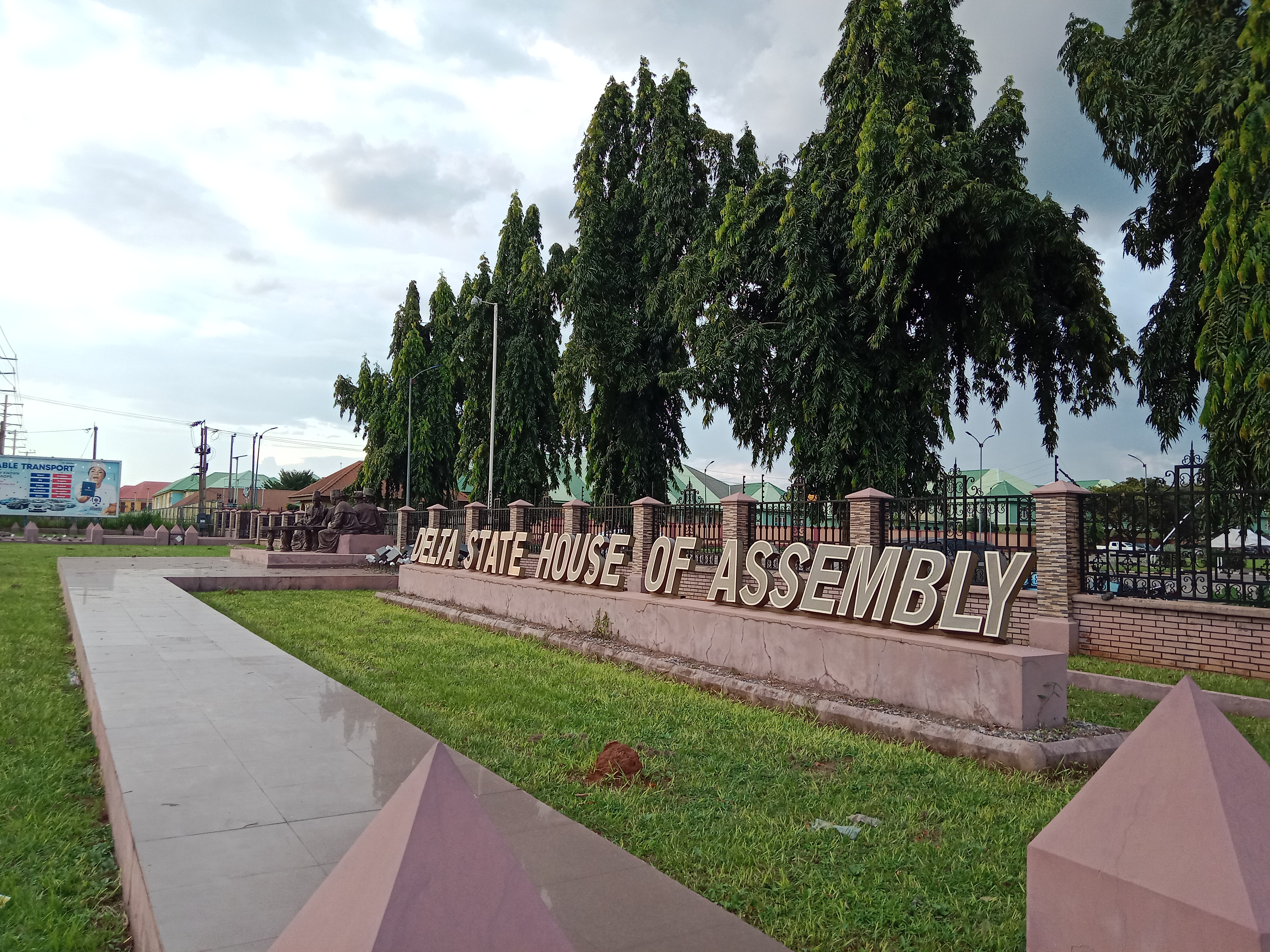

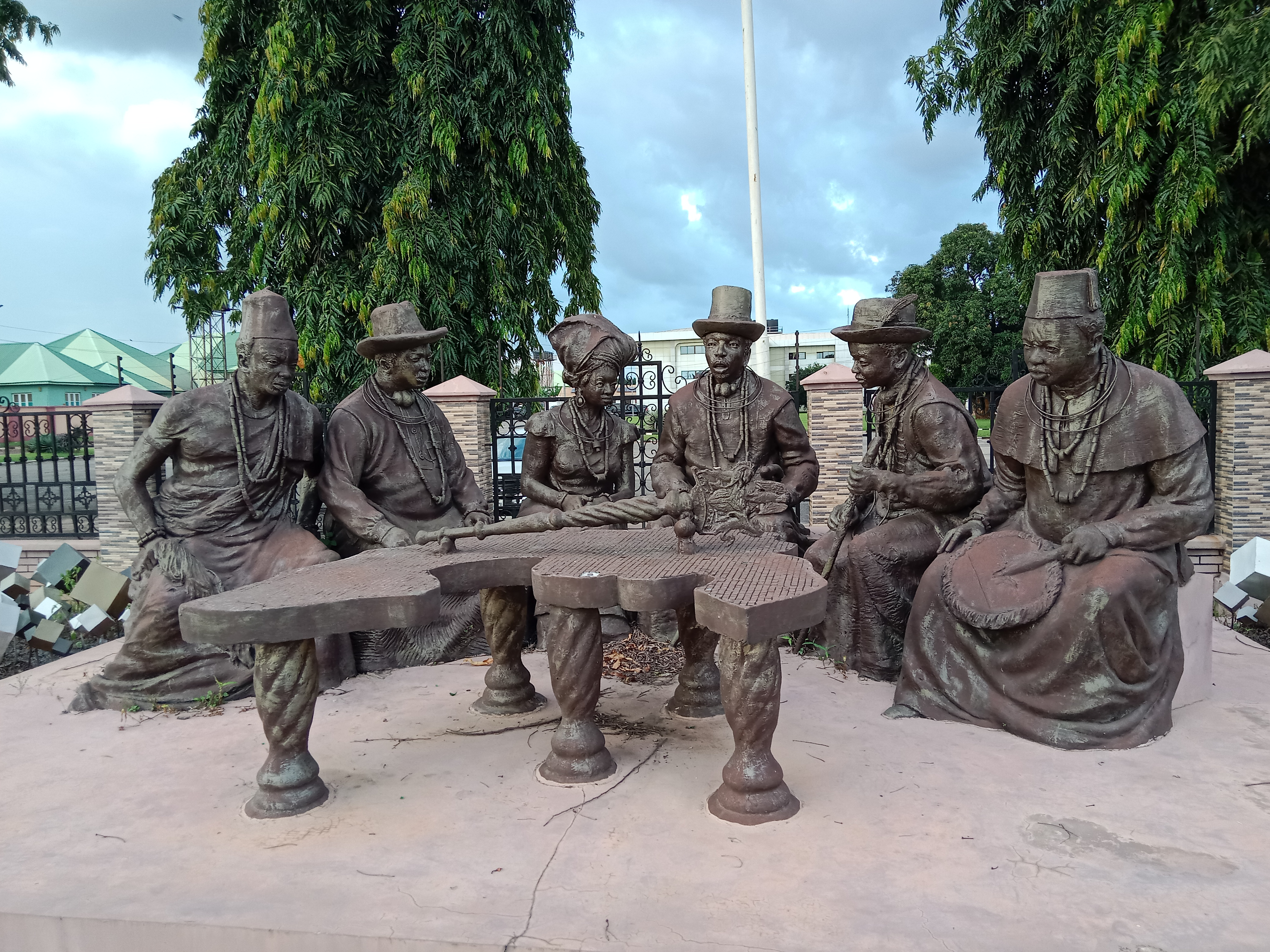
