= Freedom of Association and Protection of the Right to Organise Convention =

International Labour Organization Convention

Freedom of Association Convention
Convention concerning Freedom of Association and Protection of the Right to Organise
- Signed: 9 July 1948
- Location: San Francisco
- Effective: 4 July 1950
- Condition: two ratifications
- Parties: 158
- Depositary: Director-General of the International Labour Office
- Languages: French, English

The Freedom of Association and Protection of the Right to Organise Convention (1948) No 87 is an International Labour Organization Convention, and one of eight conventions that form the core of international labour law, as interpreted by the Declaration on Fundamental Principles and Rights at Work.

== Content ==
The Freedom of Association and Protection of the Right to Organise Convention comprises the preamble followed by four parts with a total of 21 articles. The preamble consists of the formal introduction of the instrument, at the Thirty-first Session of the General Conference of the International Labour Organization, on 17 June 1948. A statement of the "considerations" leading to the establishment of the document. These considerations include the preamble to the Constitution of the International Labour Organization; the affirmation of the Declaration of Philadelphia in regard to the issue; and the request by the General Assembly of the United Nations, upon endorsing the previously received report of 1947, to "continue every effort in order that it may be possible to adopt one or several international Conventions." In closing, the preamble states the date of adoption: 9 July 1948.

Part 1 consists of ten articles which outline the rights of both worker and employers to "join organisations of their own choosing without previous authorisation." Rights are also extended to the organizations themselves to draw up rules and constitutions, vote for officers, and organize administrative functions without interference from public authorities. There is also an explicit expectation placed on these organizations. They are required, in the exercise of these rights, to respect the law of the land. In turn, the law of the land, "shall not be such as to impair, nor shall it be so applied as to impair, the guarantees provided for in this Convention." Finally, article 9 states that these provisions are applied to both armed forces and police forces only as determined by national laws and regulations, and do not supersede previous national laws that reflect the same rights for such forces. Article 1 states all ILO members must give effect to the following provisions.

PART I. FREEDOM OF ASSOCIATION

[...]

Article 2

Workers and employers, without distinction whatsoever, shall have the right to establish and, subject only to the rules of the organisation concerned, to join organisations of their own choosing without previous authorisation.

Article 3

1. Workers' and employers' organisations shall have the right to draw up their constitutions and rules, to elect their representatives in full freedom, to organise their administration and activities and to formulate their programmes.

2. The public authorities shall refrain from any interference which would restrict this right or impede the lawful exercise thereof.

Article 4

Workers' and employers' organisations shall not be liable to be dissolved or suspended by administrative authority.

Article 5

Workers' and employers' organisations shall have the right to establish and join federations and confederations and any such organisation, federation or confederation shall have the right to affiliate with international organisations of workers and employers.

Article 6

The provisions of Articles 2, 3 and 4 hereof apply to federations and confederations of workers' and employers' organisations.

Article 7

The acquisition of legal personality by workers' and employers' organisations, federations and confederations shall not be made subject to conditions of such a character as to restrict the application of the provisions of Articles 2, 3 and 4 hereof.

Article 8

1. In exercising the rights provided for in this Convention workers and employers and their respective organisations, like other persons or organised collectivities, shall respect the law of the land.

2. The law of the land shall not be such as to impair, nor shall it be so applied as to impair, the guarantees provided for in this Convention.

Article 9

1. The extent to which the guarantees provided for in this Convention shall apply to the armed forces and the police shall be determined by national laws or regulations.

2. In accordance with the principle set forth in paragraph 8 of Article 19 of the Constitution of the International Labour Organisation [sic] the ratification of this Convention by any Member shall not be deemed to affect any existing law, award, custom or agreement in virtue of which members of the armed forces or the police enjoy any right guaranteed by this Convention.

Article 10

In this Convention the term organisation means any organisation of workers or of employers for furthering and defending the interests of workers or of employers.

Part 2 states that every ILO member undertakes to ensure "all necessary and appropriate measures to ensure that workers and employers may exercise freely the right to organise." This sentence is expanded upon in the Right to Organise and Collective Bargaining Convention, 1949.

Part 3, which contains articles 12 and 13, deals with technical matters related to the Convention. It outlines the definitions of who may accept (with or without modification), or reject the obligations of this Convention with regards to "non-metropolitan territory[ies]", whose self-governing powers extend into this area. It also discusses reporting procedures for modification of previous declarations in regard to acceptance of these obligations. Part 4 outlines the procedures for formal ratification of the Convention. The Convention was declared to come into force twelve months from the date when the Director-General had been notified of ratification by two member countries. This date became 4 July 1950, one year after Norway (preceded by Sweden) ratified the Convention. Part 4 also outlines provisions for denunciation of the Convention, including a ten-year cycle of obligation. Final discussion highlights procedures which would take place in the event that the Convention is eventually superseded by a new Convention, in whole, or in part.

== Ratifications ==
Ratifications of the convention. Green: ratified. Yellow: ratified, will be effective in future. Red: not ratified.

As of February 2024, 158 out of 187 ILO member states have ratified the convention:

Country	Date
Albania	3 June 1957
Algeria	19 November 1962
Angola	13 June 2001
Antigua and Barbuda	2 February 1983
Argentina	18 January 1960
Armenia	2 January 2006
Australia	28 February 1973
Austria	18 November 1950
Azerbaijan	19 May 1992
Bahamas	14 June 2001
Bangladesh	22 June 1972
Barbados	8 May 1967
Belarus (as the Byelorussian SSR)	6 November 1956
Belgium	23 November 1951
Belize	15 December 1983
Benin	12 December 1960
Bolivia	4 January 1965
Bosnia and Herzegovina	2 June 1993
Botswana	22 December 1997
Bulgaria	8 June 1959
Burkina Faso	21 November 1960
Burundi	25 June 1993
Cambodia	23 August 1999
Cameroon	7 June 1960
Canada	23 March 1972
Cape Verde	1 February 1999
Central African Republic	27 October 1960
Chad	10 November 1960
Chile	2 February 1999
Colombia	16 November 1976
Comoros	23 October 1978
Congo	10 November 1960
Democratic Republic of the Congo	20 June 2001
Costa Rica	2 June 1960
Côte d'Ivoire	21 November 1960
Croatia	8 October 1991
Cuba	25 June 1952
Cyprus	24 May 1966
Czech Republic	1 January 1993
Denmark	13 June 1951
Djibouti	3 August 1978
Dominica	28 February 1983
Dominican Republic	5 December 1956
East Timor	16 June 2009
Ecuador	29 May 1967
Egypt	6 November 1957
El Salvador	6 September 2006
Equatorial Guinea	13 August 2001
Eritrea	22 February 2000
Estonia	22 March 1994
Ethiopia	4 June 1963
Fiji	17 April 2002
Finland	20 January 1950
France	28 June 1951
Gabon	14 November 1960
Gambia	4 September 2000
Georgia	3 August 1999
Germany	20 March 1957
Ghana	2 June 1965
Greece	30 March 1962
Grenada	25 October 1994
Guatemala	13 February 1952
Guinea	21 January 1959
Guinea-Bissau	9 June 2023
Guyana	25 September 1967
Haiti	5 June 1979
Honduras	27 June 1956
Hungary	6 June 1957
Iceland	19 August 1950
Indonesia	9 June 1998
Iraq	1 June 2018
Ireland	4 June 1955
Israel	28 January 1957
Italy	13 May 1958
Jamaica	26 December 1962
Japan	14 June 1965
Kazakhstan	13 December 2000
Kiribati	3 February 2000
Kuwait	21 September 1961
Kyrgyzstan	31 March 1992
Latvia	27 January 1992
Lesotho	31 October 1966
Liberia	25 May 1962
Libya	4 October 2000
Lithuania	26 September 1994
Luxembourg	3 March 1958
North Macedonia	17 November 1991
Madagascar	1 November 1960
Malawi	19 November 1990
Maldives	4 January 2013
Mali	22 September 1960
Malta	4 January 1965
Mauritania	20 June 1961
Mauritius	1 April 2005
Mexico	1 April 1950
Moldova	12 August 1996
Mongolia	3 June 1969
Mozambique	23 December 1996
Myanmar	4 March 1955
Namibia	3 January 1995
Netherlands	7 March 1950
Nicaragua	31 October 1967
Niger	27 February 1961
Nigeria	17 October 1960
Norway	4 July 1949
Pakistan	14 February 1951
Panama	3 June 1958
Papua New Guinea	2 June 2000
Paraguay	28 June 1962
Peru	2 March 1960
Philippines	29 December 1953
Poland	25 February 1957
Portugal	14 October 1977
South Korea	20 April 2021
Romania	28 May 1957
Russia (as the Soviet Union)	10 August 1956
Rwanda	8 November 1988
Saint Kitts and Nevis	25 August 2000
Saint Lucia	14 May 1980
Saint Vincent and the Grenadines	9 November 2001
Samoa	30 June 2008
San Marino	19 December 1986
São Tomé and Príncipe	17 June 1992
Senegal	4 November 1960
Serbia (as Serbia and Montenegro)	24 November 2000
Seychelles	6 February 1978
Sierra Leone	15 June 1961
Slovakia	1 January 1993
Slovenia	29 May 1992
Solomon Islands	13 April 2012
Somalia	22 March 2014
South Africa	19 February 1996
Spain	20 April 1977
Sri Lanka	15 September 1995
Sudan	17 March 2021
Suriname	15 June 1976
Swaziland	26 April 1978
Sweden	25 November 1949
Switzerland	25 March 1975
Syria	26 July 1960
Tajikistan	26 November 1993
Tanzania	18 April 2000
Timor Leste	15 June 2009
Togo	7 June 1960
Trinidad and Tobago	24 May 1963
Tunisia	18 June 1957
Turkey	12 July 1993
Turkmenistan	15 May 1997
Uganda	2 June 2005
Ukraine (as the Ukrainian SSR)	14 September 1956
United Kingdom	27 June 1949
Uruguay	18 March 1954
Uzbekistan	12 December 2016
Vanuatu	28 August 2006
Venezuela	20 September 1982
Yemen	29 August 1976
Zambia	2 September 1996
Zimbabwe	9 April 2003

== See also ==
- International labour law
- Declaration on Fundamental Principles and Rights at Work
- UK labour law
