= Ronny Abraham =

French academic

His Excellency Ronny Abraham
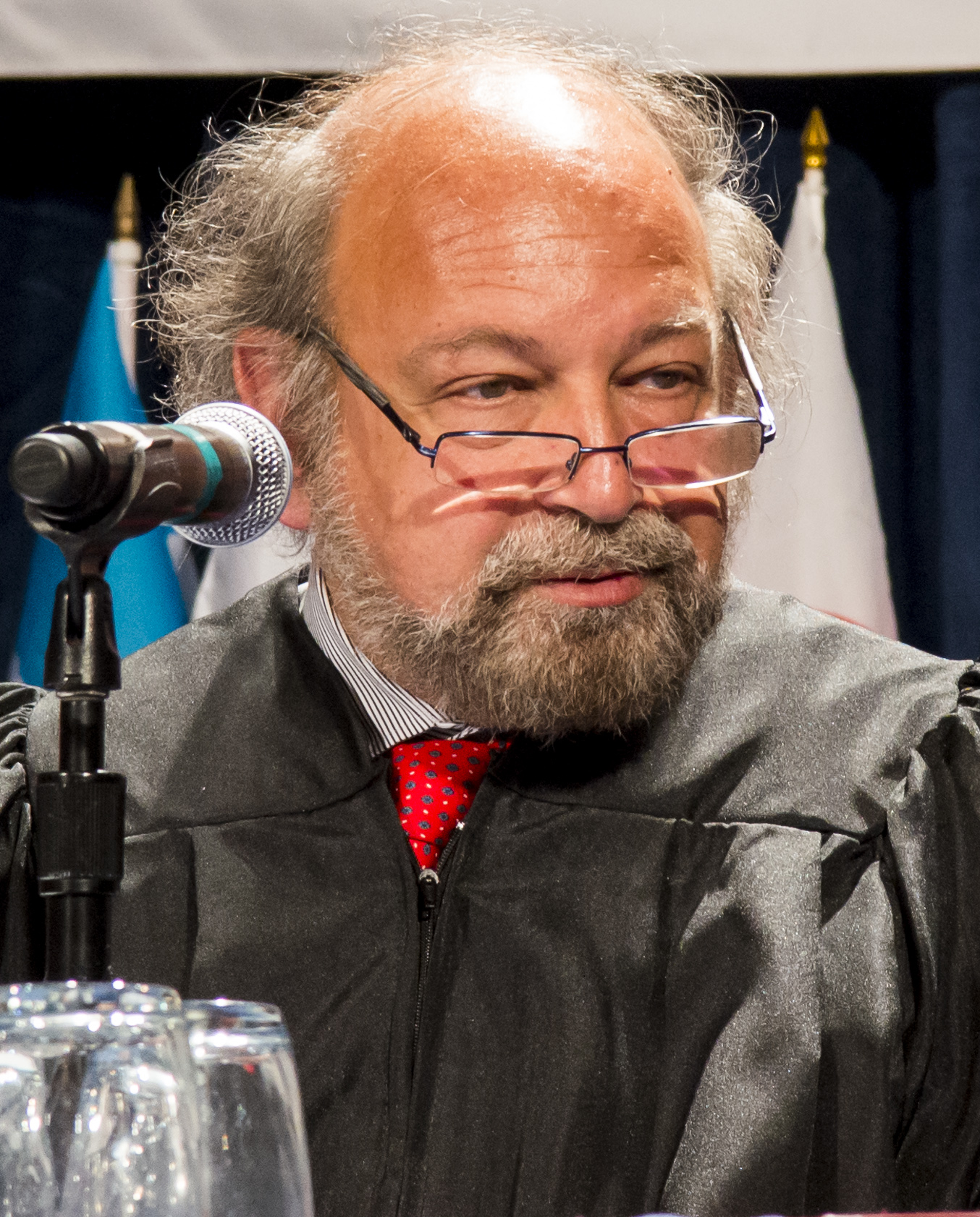
- Abraham in 2013

Judge of the International Court of Justice
- Incumbent
- Assumed office 15 February 2005
- Preceded by: Gilbert Guillaume

President of the International Court of Justice
- In office 6 February 2015 – 6 February 2018
- Preceded by: Peter Tomka
- Succeeded by: Abdulqawi Ahmed Yusuf

Personal details
- Born: 5 September 1951 (age 74) Alexandria, Kingdom of Egypt
- Education: University of Paris 1 Pantheon-Sorbonne (Diploma); National School of Administration
- Occupation: Judge

Ronny Abraham (French: [a.bʁa.am]; born 5 September 1951) is a French academic and practitioner in the field of public international law who was elected to the International Court of Justice, to fill the vacancy created by the resignation of judge and former President Gilbert Guillaume. He served the remainder of Guillaume's term which ended on 5 February 2009, and was reelected for a term extending to 2018.

== Biography ==
Abraham was born on 5 September 1951 in Alexandria, Egypt. He earned his degree in Advanced Studies in Public Law at the Panthéon-Sorbonne, is an alumnus of National School of Administration and led a distinguished career characterised by numerous academic and judicial postings, which include:

- Administrative Tribunal Judge (1978–1985 and 1987–1988)
- Assistant Director of the Office of Legal Affairs of the Ministry of Foreign Affairs (1986–1987)
- At the Council of State,
  - Maître des requêtes (1988–2000)
  - Conseiller d’État (since 2000)
- Government Commissioner within the judicial system (1989–1998).
- Director of Legal Affairs of the Ministry of Foreign Affairs (since October 1998).
- Professor at Panthéon-Assas University (since 2004)

As head of the Office of Legal Affairs of the Ministry of Foreign Affairs since 1998, he has acted as legal adviser to the Government in the areas of general international public law, European Union law, international human rights law, Law of the Sea and laws on the Antarctic.

Since 1998 he has been a representative for France in many cases before international and European courts.

== Lectures ==
- La Cour internationale de Justice à l'aube de son soixante-dixième anniversaire in the Lecture Series of the United Nations Audiovisual Library of International Law
