= Egypt and the United Nations =

Arab Republic of Egypt

United Nations membership
- Membership: Full member
- Since: 24 October 1945
- Former name(s): United Arab Republic (1958–1971)
- UNSC seat: Non-permanent
- Permanent representative: Osama Abdel Khalek

The Arab Republic of Egypt is one of the 51 founding members of the United Nations having signed the United Nations Conference on International Organization in 1945. Following a plebiscite in 1958, the United Arab Republic was established through the union of Egypt and Syria and continued as a single Member of the United Nations. On 13 October 1961, Syria resumed its status as an independent state and its separate membership in the United Nations. Egypt has been a non-permanent member of the UN Security Council for five terms (a total of 9 years), with the most recent being the 2016–17 term.

Egypt is a charter member of the United Nations and participates in all of its specialised agencies except for the Organisation for the Prohibition of Chemical Weapons. Egypt has contributed 1,635 troops to United Nations peacekeeping efforts as of 2024.

== Activities ==
=== Funding ===
The regular budget of the United Nations is financed through compulsory contributions from its member states. From 2022 to 2024, Egypt contributed 0.139% of the UN regular budget. This placed Egypt as the 59th nation by contribution amount.

=== Security Council ===
Egypt has held a non-permanent seat in the United Nations Security Council five times since its entry in 1945.

Security Council terms
| Election | Term |
|---|---|
| January 1946 | 1946 |
| 1948 | 1949–50 |
| 1983 | 1984–85 |
| 1995 | 1996–97 |
| 2015 | 2016–17 |

In addition, the United Arab Republic, a merger of Egypt and Syria, was elected at the 1961 United Nations Security Council election to serve from 1962–63.

=== Peacekeeping ===
As of September 2025, Egypt participates in five peacekeeping missions led by the UN.

Peacekeeping missions
| Region | Conflict | Mission | Personnel |
|---|---|---|---|
| Western Sahara | Western Sahara conflict | MINURSO | 14 |
| Central African Republic | Central African Republic Civil War | MINUSCA | 950 |
| DR Congo | Democratic Republic of the Congo–Rwanda conflict (2022–2025) | MONUSCO | 201 |
| Abyei | Abyei border conflict | UNISFA | 6 |
| South Sudan | South Sudanese Civil War | UNMISS | 40 |

== Positions held ==
Egypt has held one Secretary-General of the United Nations in Boutros Boutros-Ghali, who served for five years from 1992 to 1996. Five Egyptians have been President of the United Nations Security Council, and the nation has served on the United Nations Credentials Committee once in 2011.

There have been three Egyptian permanent judges of the International Court of Justice, including one (Abdel Hamid Badawi) who served as vice president of the court from 1955 to 1958. Three Egyptian judges have also served on the court on an ad hoc basis.

Egypt has never held the President of the United Nations General Assembly, Deputy Secretary-General of the United Nations, or President of the United Nations Economic and Social Council titles.

United Nations positions held
| Position | Person | Term |
|---|---|---|
| Secretary-General of the United Nations | Boutros Boutros-Ghali | 1992–1996 |
| Presidency of the United Nations Security Council | Hafez Afifi Pasha | 17 April–16 May 1946 |
| Presidency of the United Nations Security Council | Mahmoud Fawzi Bey | April 1949, April 1950 |
| Presidency of the United Nations Security Council | Ahmed Tawfik Khalil | December 1984 |
| Presidency of the United Nations Security Council | Nabil Elaraby | June 1996 |
| Presidency of the United Nations Security Council | Amr Abdellatif Aboulatta | May 2016, August 2017 |
| Permanent judges of the International Court of Justice | Abdel Hamid Badawi | 1946-1965 |
| Permanent judges of the International Court of Justice | Abdullah El-Erian | 1979-1981 |
| Permanent judges of the International Court of Justice | Nabil Elaraby | 2001-2006 |
| Judges sitting ad hoc on the International Court of Justice | Georges Abi-Saab | 1983-1987, 1990-1994 |
| Judges sitting ad hoc on the International Court of Justice | Ahmed Sadek El-Kosheri | 1992-2003 |
| Judges sitting ad hoc on the International Court of Justice | Nabil Elaraby | 2018-2020 |
| United Nations Credentials Committee | —N/a | 2011 |

The United Arab Republic also served as president of the Security Council three times: in January and December 1961 as Omar Loutfi, and in November 1962 as Mahmoud Riad. The UAR also was on the 1960 and 1965 United Nations Credentials Committee.

== Permanent representative ==
Egypt has a mission to the UN led by a permanent representative, also known as a UN Ambassador. The position is currently held by Osama Abdel Khalek.

== Classification ==
African Group Asia and the Pacific Group Eastern European Group Latin American and Caribbean Group Western European and Others Group

Egypt participates in the African Group regional grouping. It is part of the Northern Africa geographical subregion.

== See also ==
- Category:Egypt and the United Nations (12)
