= Netherlands and the United Nations =

Kingdom of the Netherlands

United Nations membership
- Membership: Full member
- Since: 10 December 1945
- UNSC seat: Non-permanent
- Permanent representative: Lise Gregoire-van Haaren

The Kingdom of the Netherlands is one of the 51 founding members of the United Nations having signed the United Nations Conference on International Organization in 1945. It primarily represents the northwestern European country of the Netherlands, although it also represents the smaller island countries of Aruba, Curaçao, and Sint Maarten under the Kingdom's control.

The Netherlands has been a non-permanent member of the UN Security Council for six terms (a total of 10 years), with the most recent being a 2018 one-year term.

The Netherlands is a charter member of the United Nations and participates in all of its specialised agencies. It is home to The Hague, which is the headquarters of the International Court of Justice and Organisation for the Prohibition of Chemical Weapons. The Netherlands has contributed 13 troops to United Nations peacekeeping efforts as of 2024.

== Classification ==
African Group Asia and the Pacific Group Eastern European Group Latin American and Caribbean Group Western European and Others Group

The Kingdom of Netherlands participates in the Western European and Others Group regional grouping. Its constituent countries are part of different geographical subregions: The Netherlands is part of Western Europe while Aruba, Curaçao, and Sint Maarten are part of the Caribbean subregion and Latin America and the Caribbean (LAC) intermediary region. In addition, the Caribbean Netherlands non-country islands of Bonaire, Sint Eustatius, and Saba also belong to the Caribbean subregion and LAC intermediary region.

== Activities ==
=== Funding ===
The regular budget of the United Nations is financed through compulsory contributions from its member states. From 2022 to 2024, the Netherlands contributed 1.356% of the UN regular budget. This placed the Netherlands as the 15th nation by contribution amount.

=== Security Council ===
The Netherlands has held a non-permanent seat in the United Nations Security Council six times since its entry in 1945.

Security Council terms
Election	Votes (Pl.-Rd.)	Term
January 1946	37/50 (5th-R1)	1946
1950	47/59 (2nd-R1)	1951–52
1964	Assembly motion	1965–66
1983	103/155 (1st-R2)	1983–84
1998	122/176 (2nd-R1)	1999–00
2017	184/188 (1st-R1)	2018

=== Peacekeeping ===
As of September 2025, the Netherlands participates in two peacekeeping missions led by the UN.

Peacekeeping missions
Region	Mission	Personnel
Lebanon	United Nations Interim Force in Lebanon (UNIFIL)	1
Middle East and North Africa	United Nations Truce Supervision Organization (UNTSO)	11

== Positions held ==
The Netherlands has had one President of the United Nations General Assembly in Eelco van Kleffens, who served in 1954. Eleven Dutch representatives have served as President of the United Nations Security Council and two Dutch representatives have headed the Economic and Social Council. The nation has served on the United Nations Credentials Committee six times.

There has been one Dutch permanent judge of the International Court of Justice. Two Dutch judges have also served on the court on an ad hoc basis.

The Netherlands has never held the Secretary-General of the United Nations or Deputy Secretary-General of the United Nations positions.

United Nations positions held
Position	Person	Term
President of the United Nations General Assembly	Eelco van Kleffens	1954
Presidency of the United Nations Security Council	Eelco van Kleffens	17 July–16 August 1946
Presidency of the United Nations Security Council	D. J. von Balluseck	March 1951, April 1951, March 1952
Presidency of the United Nations Security Council	J. G. de Beus	June 1965, May 1966
Presidency of the United Nations Security Council	Max van der Stoel	December 1983
Presidency of the United Nations Security Council	Peter van Walsum	September 1999, November 2000
Presidency of the United Nations Security Council	Jozias van Aartsen	September 1999, November 2000
Presidency of the United Nations Security Council	Eveline Herfkens	November 2000
Presidency of the United Nations Security Council	Karel van Oosterom	March 2018
Presidency of the United Nations Security Council	Sigrid Kaag	March 2018
Presidency of the United Nations Security Council	Stef Blok	March 2018
Presidency of the United Nations Security Council	Mark Rutte	March 2018
President of the United Nations Economic and Social Council	C. W. A. Schurmann	1960
President of the United Nations Economic and Social Council	Hugo Scheltema	1979
Permanent judges of the International Court of Justice	Pieter Kooijmans	1997-2006
Judges sitting ad hoc on the International Court of Justice	Johannes Offerhaus	1957-1958
Judges sitting ad hoc on the International Court of Justice	Willem Riphagen	1962-1970
United Nations Credentials Committee	—	1956, 1976, 1981, 1986, 1996, 2016

== Permanent representative ==
The Netherlands has a mission to the UN led by a permanent representative, also known as a UN Ambassador. The position is currently held by Lise Gregoire-van Haaren, who presented credentials in October 2024.

== See also ==
- Category:Netherlands and the United Nations (11)
