= 1992 United Nations Security Council election =

Election to the United Nations Security Council

- 27 October 1992

5 of 10 non-permanent seats on the United Nations Security Council
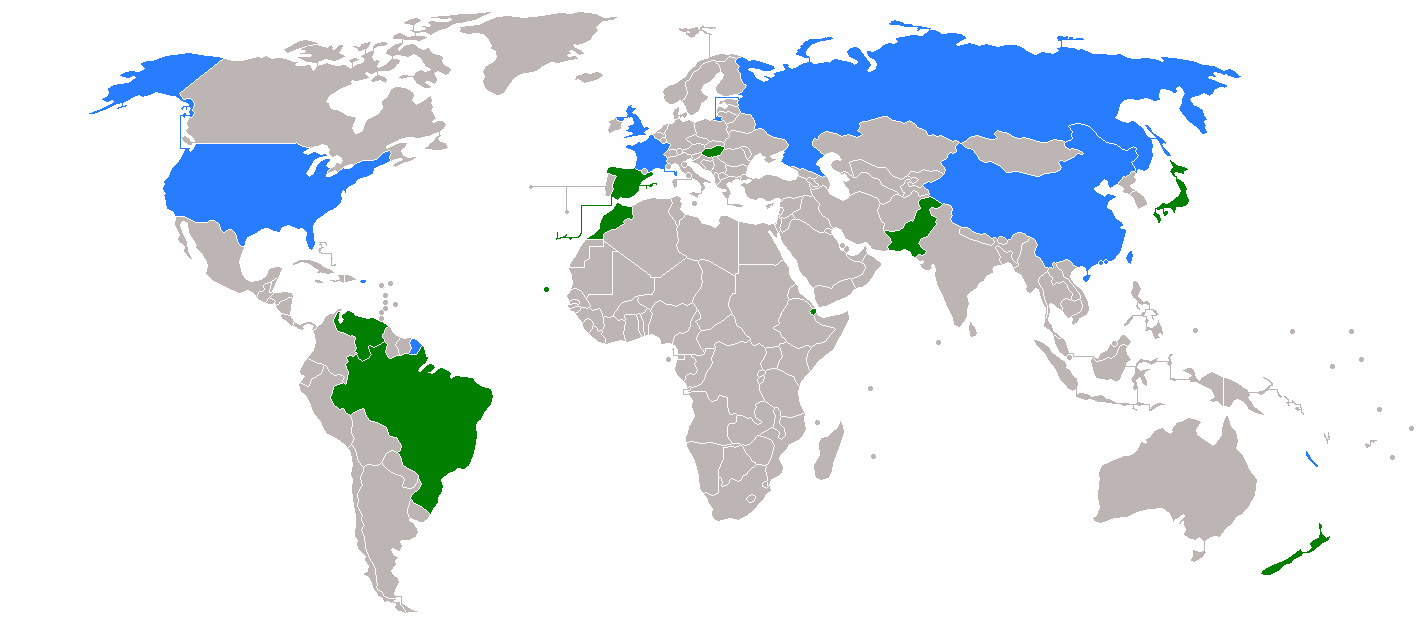
- United Nations Security Council membership after the election Permanent members Non-permanent members
- Outgoing members Zimbabwe (Africa) India (Asia) Ecuador (GRULAC) Austria (WEOG) Belgium (WEOG) Elected members Djibouti (Africa) Pakistan (Asia) Brazil (GRULAC) New Zealand (WEOG) Spain (WEOG)

- Unsuccessful candidate
- Sweden (WEOG)

The 1992 United Nations Security Council election was held on 27 October 1992 during the Forty-seventh session of the United Nations General Assembly, held at United Nations Headquarters in New York City. The General Assembly elected Brazil, Djibouti (for the first time), New Zealand, Pakistan, and Spain, as the five new non-permanent members of the UN Security Council for two-year mandates commencing on 1 January 1993.

== Rules ==
The Security Council has 15 seats, filled by five permanent members and ten non-permanent members. Each year, half of the non-permanent members are elected for two-year terms. A sitting member may not immediately run for re-election.

In accordance with the rules whereby the ten non-permanent UNSC seats rotate among the various regional blocs into which UN member states traditionally divide themselves for voting and representation purposes, the five available seats are allocated as follows:

- One for African countries (held by Zimbabwe)
- One for countries from the Asian Group (now the Asia-Pacific Group) (held by India)
- One for Latin America and the Caribbean (held by Ecuador)
- Two for the Western European and Others Group (held by Austria and Belgium)

To be elected, a candidate must receive a two-thirds majority of those present and voting. If the vote is inconclusive after the first round, three rounds of restricted voting shall take place, followed by three rounds of unrestricted voting, and so on, until a result has been obtained. In restricted voting, only official candidates may be voted on, while in unrestricted voting, any member of the given regional group, with the exception of current Council members, may be voted on.

The regional block rotations were enforced by statute since the 1963 UNSC reforms, however for the 1991 vote and earlier, each nation submitted only one ballot for the first round containing nations from all blocks up for election. Beginning in 1992, three ballots were distributed per nation for the first round of voting; one for each regional block. As a result, the required majority could be different per regional block.

== Pre-election statements ==
Before the vote itself was held, the Chairmen of the regional groups made their statements endorsing the respective regional candidates. Mr. Ould Mohamed Mahmoud of Mauritania, speaking on behalf of the African Group, transferred the recommendation for the candidacy of Djibouti by both the African Group and the Organization of African Unity. Mr. Aksin of Turkey, speaking on behalf of the Asian Group, transferred the endorsement of the Group for the candidacy of Pakistan. Mr. Piriz Ballon of Uruguay transferred the endorsement of the Latin American and Caribbean Group for the candidacy of Brazil. Mr. Haakonsen of Denmark, speaking for the Western European and Others Group, announced the candidatures of New Zealand, Spain, and Sweden.

== Results ==
=== African and Asian States ===
African and Asian States election results
Member	Round 1
Djibouti	170
Pakistan	161
Iran	1
Nigeria	1
abstentions	1
invalid ballots	0
required majority	115

=== Latin American and Caribbean Group ===
Latin American and Caribbean Group election results
Member	Round 1
Brazil	168
abstentions	5
invalid ballots	0
required majority	112

=== Western European and Others Group ===
Western European and Others Group election results
Member	Round 1	Round 2	Round 3
Spain	118	—	—
New Zealand	108	99	117
Sweden	109	74	55
invalid ballots	0	0	0
abstentions	0	0	0
required majority	116	116	115

== See also ==
- List of members of the United Nations Security Council,
- Brazil and the United Nations
- New Zealand and the United Nations
- Pakistan and the United Nations
