= 1982 United Nations Security Council election =

Election to the United Nations Security Council

- 19 October 1982

5 of 10 non-permanent seats on the United Nations Security Council
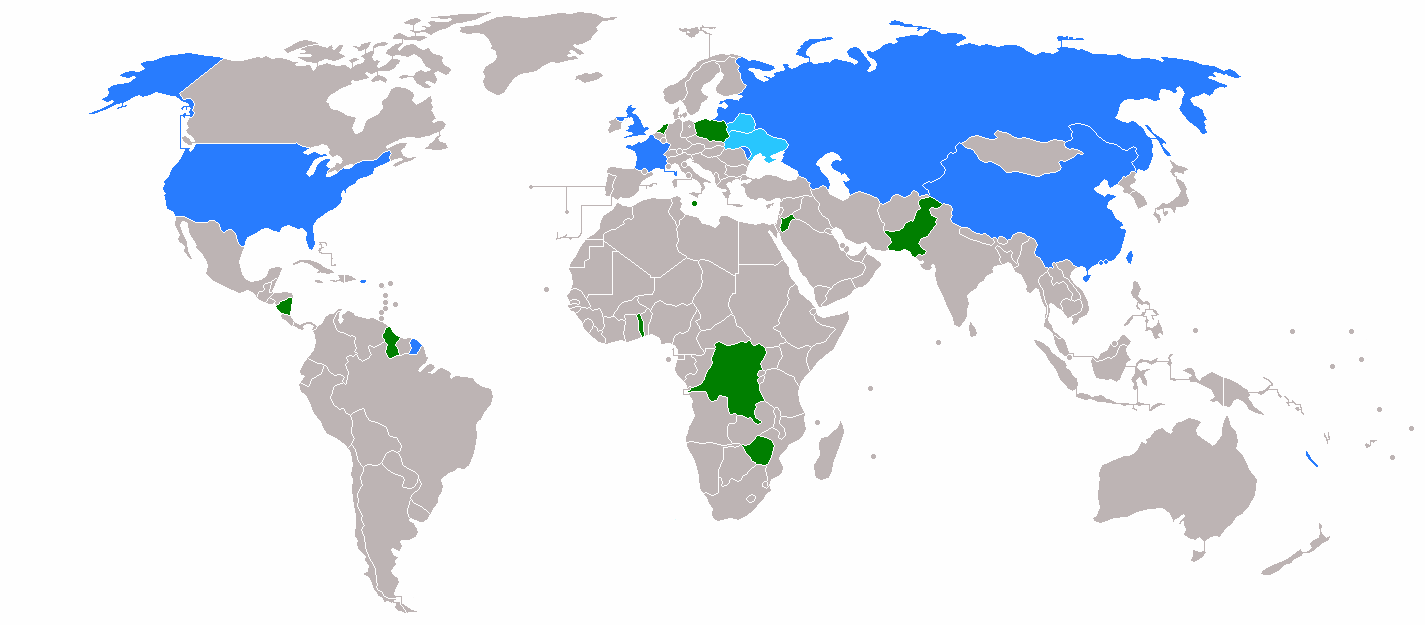
- United Nations Security Council membership after the election Permanent members Non-permanent members
- Outgoing members Uganda (Africa) Japan (Asia) Panama (GRULAC) Ireland (WEOG) Spain (WEOG) Elected members Zimbabwe (Africa) Pakistan (Asia) Nicaragua (GRULAC) Malta (WEOG) Netherlands (WEOG)

- Unsuccessful candidates
- Dominican Republic (GRULAC)
- New Zealand (WEOG)

The 1982 United Nations Security Council election was held on 19 October 1982 during the Thirty-seventh session of the United Nations General Assembly, held at United Nations Headquarters in New York City. The General Assembly elected Malta, the Netherlands, Nicaragua, Pakistan, and Zimbabwe, as the five new non-permanent members of the UN Security Council for two-year mandates commencing on 1 January 1983. Both Malta and Zimbabwe were elected members of the Council for the first time.

== Rules ==
The Security Council has 15 seats, filled by five permanent members and ten non-permanent members. Each year, half of the non-permanent members are elected for two-year terms. A sitting member may not immediately run for re-election.

In accordance with the rules whereby the ten non-permanent UNSC seats rotate among the various regional blocs into which UN member states traditionally divide themselves for voting and representation purposes, the five available seats are allocated as follows:

- One for African countries (held by Uganda)
- One for countries from the Asian Group (now called the Asia-Pacific Group) (held by Japan)
- One for Latin American and Caribbean Group (GRULAC) (held by Panama)
- Two for the Western European and Others Group (held by Ireland and Spain)

To be elected, a candidate must receive a two-thirds majority of those present and voting. If the vote is inconclusive after the first round, three rounds of restricted voting shall take place, followed by three rounds of unrestricted voting, and so on, until a result has been obtained. In restricted voting, only official candidates may be voted on, while in unrestricted voting, any member of the given regional group, with the exception of current Council members, may be voted on.

== Endorsed candidates ==
Portugal, speaking on behalf of the Western European and Others Group informed the assembly that Malta, the Netherlands, and New Zealand were candidates for the two seats attributed to this group, without endorsing any of them. The Asian Group communicated its endorsement in writing. Prior to the voting, a letter from the Group's chairman endorsing Pakistan was read out by the President of the Assembly. The Latin American and Caribbean, and African Groups did not endorse candidates.

== Result ==
=== Round 1 ===
The first round of voting was conducted on a single ballot. Ballots containing more states from a certain region than seats allocated to that region were invalidated.

Member	Round 1
Zimbabwe	138
Pakistan	127
Netherlands	100
Malta	94
Nicaragua	92
New Zealand	77
Dominican Republic	59
Sri Lanka	6
Barbados	1
Benin	1
Cyprus	1
Comoros	1
People's Republic of the Congo	1
Denmark	1
Ghana	1
India	1
Senegal	1
abstentions	0
invalid ballots	0
required majority	102

=== Subsequent rounds ===
Following the first round, voting for the two remaining geographic groups was conducted separately. By a drawing of lots, it was decided that the voting on the seat for the Latin American and Caribbean Group would be conducted first. 155 votes and 1 abstention were cast in all subsequent rounds.

==== GRULAC ====
Member	Round 2	Round 3
Nicaragua	99	104
Dominican Republic	55	50
abstentions	1	1
invalid ballots	0	0
required majority	103	103

==== WEOG ====
Member	Round 2	Round 3
Netherlands	103	–
Malta	102	111
New Zealand	66	43
abstentions	1	1
invalid ballots	0	0
required majority	103	103

== See also ==
- List of members of the United Nations Security Council
- New Zealand and the United Nations
- Pakistan and the United Nations
