= 2014 United Nations Security Council election =

Election to the United Nations Security Council

- 16 October 2014

5 of 10 non-permanent seats on the United Nations Security Council
- United Nations Security Council membership after the election Permanent members Non-permanent members
- Outgoing members Rwanda (Africa) Republic of Korea (Asia–Pacific) Argentina (GRULAC) Australia (WEOG) Luxembourg (WEOG) Elected members Angola (Africa) Malaysia (Asia–Pacific) Venezuela (GRULAC) New Zealand (WEOG) Spain (WEOG)

- Unsuccessful candidate
- Turkey (WEOG)

The 2014 United Nations Security Council election was held on 16 October 2014 during the 69th session of the United Nations General Assembly, held at United Nations Headquarters in New York City. The elections were for five non-permanent seats on the UN Security Council for two-year mandates commencing on 1 January 2015. In accordance with the Security Council's rotation rules, whereby the ten non-permanent UNSC seats rotate among the various regional blocs into which UN member states traditionally divide themselves for voting and representation purposes, the five available seats were allocated as follows:

- One for the African Group
- One for the Asia-Pacific Group
- One for the Latin American and Caribbean Group
- Two for the Western European and Others Group

The five members served on the Security Council for the 2015–16 period. The countries elected were Angola, Malaysia, New Zealand, Spain, and Venezuela.

== Candidates ==
=== African Group ===
- Angola

=== Asia-Pacific Group ===
- Fiji (withdrew prior to election)
- Malaysia

=== Latin American and Caribbean Group ===
- Venezuela

=== Western European and Others Group ===
- New Zealand
- Spain
- Turkey

== Campaign ==
Malaysian Permanent Representative to the UN Datuk Hussein Haniff said: "I have been participating in all the open debates. The Malaysian mission is actively engaged in lobbying to get elected. We are the only candidate from Asia, so far, for a UNSC non-permanent seat, and need to get a two-thirds majority in the General Assembly for a non-permanent membership". Additionally, he asserted that while Malaysia was the sole candidate as of the end of 2013 for the seat, he hopes that "this will remain so until the electoral process is finalised". Foreign Minister Dato' Seri Anifah Aman also said that "We must not take it for granted. We have to work very hard and we have to engage and meet leaders from various countries to secure the seat, but I am quite confident that Malaysia has a very good name globally".

== Opinions about Venezuela's candidacy ==
Due to the ongoing protests against the government within Venezuela, and the International Criminal Court's reopening of the preliminary investigation of the head of state and others on suspicions of Crimes Against Humanity, there have been objections from domestic dissidents, such as Diego Arria, former ambassador of Venezuela to the United Nations during Venezuela's last term on the Security Council and Governor of the Federal District of Caracas in the mid-1970s during the presidency of Carlos Andrés Pérez, to having Venezuela as an elected member of the Security Council. Opposition has also come from figures such as Hillel Neuer, head of human rights organization UN Watch, according to whom "[e]lecting Venezuela to the UN Security Council is like making a pyromaniac into the fire chief".

== Results ==
=== African and Asia-Pacific Groups ===
African and Asia-Pacific Groups election results
Member	Round 1
Angola	190
Malaysia	187
Republic of the Congo	1
valid ballots	193
abstentions	1
present and voting	192
required majority	128

=== Latin American and Caribbean Group ===
Latin American and Caribbean Group election results
Member	Round 1
Venezuela	181
Brazil	1
valid ballots	192
invalid ballots	1
abstentions	10
present and voting	182
required majority	122

=== Western European and Others Group ===
Western European and Others Group election results
Member	Round 1	Round 2	Round 3
New Zealand	145	—	—
Spain	121	120	132
Turkey	109	73	60
valid ballots	193	193	193
abstentions	0	0	1
present and voting	193	193	192
required majority	129	129	128

== See also ==
- List of members of the United Nations Security Council
- Fiji and the United Nations
- New Zealand and the United Nations
- European Union and the United Nations
