= United Nations General Committee =

Function of the United Nations General Assembly

- Legal status: Active
- Headquarters: New York, United States
- Members: 28 members
- President: Khalilur Rahman
- Parent organization: United Nations General Assembly
- Website: www.un.org/en/ga/general/general.shtml

The United Nations General Committee is a committee of the United Nations General Assembly whose main purpose is to organize the body's agenda, among other things.

The committee consists of 28 members: the president of the United Nations General Assembly, the 21 vice-presidents of the Assembly, and the chairs of the six main committees.

== Mandate ==
The mandate of the General Committee consists of the following:

- Creating a provisional agenda for the General Assembly, as well as any supplementary lists.
- Assisting the president of the General Assembly and the General Assembly in drawing up the agenda for each plenary meeting.
- Making recommendations to the General Assembly concerning the recess and closing dates of the session.
- Coordinating the proceedings of the main committees by allocating agenda items, as well as determining the priority of said items.
- Entertaining requests for the inclusion of additional items in the agenda.
- Assisting in the general conduct of the work of the General Assembly.
- Making recommendations to the General Assembly.

The committee meets periodically to review the progress of the General Assembly and its committees. It also meets at such times as the president deems necessary or upon the request of any other of its members.

An individual vice-president of the General Assembly does not have the power to unilaterally add an item to the General Assembly's agenda, not even if they are a permanent member of the UN Security Council such as the United States. For example, the General Committee has regularly rejected agenda items about the participation of the Republic of China (Taiwan), even when raised by a sitting vice-president who formally recognizes the Republic of China (such as Guatemala in 1993).

== Regional groups ==
The rules of the General Assembly state that the president and 21 vice-presidents must be elected from the following Regional Groups:

- 5 from the permanent members of the UN Security Council
- 6 from the African Group
- 5 from the Asia–Pacific Group
- 1 from the Eastern European Group (EEG)
- 3 from the Latin American and Caribbean Group (GRULAC)
- 2 from the Western European and Others Group (WEOG)

In addition, the chairs of the six main committees must consist of one from each group, with the remaining chair rotating unevenly between the three non-European groups (Note: The rule states the pattern ABAC→BABC→ABAC→ABAC→BABC repeating every 20 elections, where A is the African Group, B is the Asia-Pacific Group, and C is the Latin American and Caribbean Group.) (prior to 1994, there were seven main committees, with two chairs from the African Group, one chair from every other group, and the remaining chair rotating between the Asia–Pacific Group and the Latin American and Caribbean Group "every alternate year").

The rules also state that every member of the General Committee must be from a different country. As the permanent members of the Security Council are always vice-presidents, this rule bans the permanent members from being president of the General Assembly or chairs of any main committee.

== Members ==
=== President and vice-presidents ===
The president's seat is highlighted below. The permanent members of the Security Council are also vice-presidents.

| Year | African Group | | | | | | Asia-Pacific Group | | | | | Eastern European Group (Note: In an odd inconsistency, the General Committee page of the United Nations website has listed an "Eastern European and Other States" group since about mid-2019. Throughout the 2024 session, the page listed Kyrgyzstan and Turkmenistan as group members. This does not match the original meeting record, which has no such group and puts the two countries in the Asia-Pacific Group as normal. The page has correctly put Turkmenistan in the Asia-Pacific Group in 2020 and 2022.) | Latin American and Caribbean Group | | | Western European and Others Group | |
|---|---|---|---|---|---|---|---|---|---|---|---|---|---|---|---|---|---|
| 2015 | Benin | Cameroon | Egypt | Eritrea | Mozambique | Togo | Bahrain | Kazakhstan | Nauru | South Korea | Yemen | Azerbaijan | Colombia | Ecuador | Paraguay | Denmark | Italy |
| 2016 | Congo | Côte d'Ivoire | Djibouti | Mauritania | Nigeria | Zambia | Fiji | Bangladesh | Nepal | Solomon Islands | Turkmenistan | Armenia | Bahamas | Belize | El Salvador | Belgium | Germany |
| 2017 | Gabon | Ghana | Liberia | Madagascar | Morocco | Zimbabwe | Afghanistan | Indonesia | Sri Lanka | United Arab Emirates | Vanuatu | Slovakia | Bolivia | Chile | Guatemala | Finland | Israel |
| 2018 | Algeria | Burkina Faso | DR Congo | The Gambia | Namibia | Sudan | Cambodia | Cyprus | Iraq | Japan | Qatar | Ukraine | Ecuador | Guyana | Panama | San Marino | Spain |
| 2019 | Nigeria | Cabo Verde | Congo | Ethiopia | Tunisia | Zimbabwe | Indonesia | Oman | Papua New Guinea | Singapore | Turkey | Uzbekistan | Croatia | Argentina | Trinidad and Tobago | Belize | Malta |
| 2020 | Cameroon | Eswatini | Libya | Mali | Somalia | Togo | Afghanistan | Jordan | Lebanon | Palau | Turkmenistan | Albania | Grenada | Paraguay | Peru | Turkey | Monaco |
| 2021 | Côte d'Ivoire | Egypt | Equatorial Guinea | Mozambique | Sierra Leone | Tanzania | Maldives | Bangladesh | Kuwait | Laos | Philippines | Slovenia | Costa Rica | Dominican Republic | Haiti | Belgium | Finland |
| 2022 | Benin | Burundi | Kenya | Mauritania | Niger | Zimbabwe | Malaysia | Nepal | Tajikistan | Turkmenistan | Vietnam | Hungary | Chile | El Salvador | Jamaica | Australia | Israel |
| 2023 | Congo | The Gambia | Morocco | Senegal | Uganda | Zambia | Malaysia | Iran | Singapore | Sri Lanka | Uzbekistan | Estonia | Trinidad and Tobago | Bolivia | Suriname | Iceland | Netherlands |
| 2024 | Cameroon | Algeria | Angola | Senegal | Ghana | Madagascar | Kyrgyzstan | Micronesia | Thailand | Tonga | Turkmenistan | Moldova | Barbados | Guatemala | Venezuela | Austria | Italy |
| 2025 | Cabo Verde | DR Congo | Kenya | Senegal | Lesotho | Tunisia | Bangladesh | Lebanon | Maldives | Saudi Arabia | Timor-Leste | Montenegro | Argentina | Saint Kitts and Nevis | Venezuela | Germany | Andorra |

=== Chairs of the six main committees ===
The six seats are negotiated between the regional groups; a single group does not always chair a specific main committee.

| Year | African Group | Asia-Pacific Group | Eastern European Group | Latin American and Caribbean Group | Western European and Others Group | Rotating seat |
|---|---|---|---|---|---|---|
| 2015 | Morocco | Nepal | Slovenia | Trinidad and Tobago | Netherlands | Malawi |
| 2016 | Algeria | Indonesia | Croatia | Colombia | Israel | Saint Vincent and the Grenadines |
| 2017 | Cameroon | Iraq | Estonia | Venezuela | Iceland | Singapore |
| 2018 | Liberia | Afghanistan | Romania | Guatemala | Australia | Gabon |
| 2019 | Senegal | Iraq | Slovakia | Bolivia | Luxembourg | Cyprus |
| 2020 | Botswana | Nepal | Hungary | Uruguay | Spain | Chile |
| 2021 | Morocco | Qatar | Armenia | El Salvador | Malta | Djibouti |
| 2022 | Mozambique | Sri Lanka | Bulgaria | Dominican Republic | Belgium | Oman |
| 2023 | South Africa | Thailand | Lithuania | Uruguay | Austria | Egypt |
| 2024 | Burundi | Bangladesh | Latvia | Costa Rica | Portugal | El Salvador |
| 2025 | The Gambia | Thailand | Hungary | Guatemala | Italy | Philippines |

== See also ==
- United Nations Credentials Committee
