= 2017 United Nations Security Council election =

Election to the United Nations Security Council

- 2 June 2017

6 of 10 non-permanent seats on the United Nations Security Council
- United Nations Security Council membership after the election Permanent members Non-permanent members
- Outgoing members Egypt (Africa) Senegal (Africa)^{a} Japan (Asia–Pacific) Uruguay (GRULAC) Ukraine (EEG) Italy (WEOG) a. Arab state Elected members Ivory Coast (Africa) Equatorial Guinea (Africa) Kuwait (Asia–Pacific)^{a} Peru (GRULAC) Poland (EEG) Netherlands (WEOG)

The 2017 United Nations Security Council election was held on 2 June 2017 during the 71st session of the United Nations General Assembly, held at United Nations Headquarters in New York City. In addition to the regular elections for five of the non-permanent seats on the UN Security Council, there was by-election for a sixth seat held by Italy who relinquished its seat at the end of the year as part of a term splitting agreement with the Netherlands. The regular elections are for two-year mandates commencing on 1 January 2018; the by-election is for the remainder of Italy's term. In accordance with the Security Council's rotation rules, whereby the ten non-permanent UNSC seats rotate among the various regional blocs into which UN member states traditionally divide themselves for voting and representation purposes, the five regularly available seats are allocated as follows:

- Two for the African Group
- One for the Asia-Pacific Group
- One for the Latin American and Caribbean Group
- One for the Eastern European Group

The six elected members began their two-year terms on 1 January 2018, and continued to serve on the Security Council until the end of 2019. Notably, Equatorial Guinea was elected to the Council for the first time.

== Candidates ==
=== African Group ===
As a result of the rotation policy implemented by the Security Council for designation of its temporary seats, two nations from Africa would be selected. Prospective candidates were further limited by internal subdivision within the Africa Group.

- Ivory Coast
- Equatorial Guinea

The two candidates ran unopposed.

=== Asia Pacific Group ===
- Kuwait

=== Latin American and Caribbean Group ===
- Peru

=== Eastern European Group ===
The Eastern European Group was designated one seat on the Security Council in the election. Poland, having attempted to procure a seat in the past, announced its candidacy, as did Bulgaria. However, the latter dropped out of the race in December 2016, leaving Poland unopposed for the seat.

- Poland

The two-year tenure will represent Poland's sixth term as a temporary member of the Security Council. Witold Waszczykowski, the Minister of Foreign Affairs, heralded their election as "a great victory for Polish diplomacy".

=== Western European and Others Group ===
Conventionally, there are only five seats available in each UN Security Council election. However, Italy, having claimed the Western European seat the 2016 election, agreed to vacate after one year and allow the Netherlands to take its place. The Netherlands ran unopposed.

- Netherlands

The presence of the Netherlands on the Security Council represented their first term on the body in twenty years. Minister of Foreign Affairs Halbe Zijlstra said, in a meeting with UN Secretary-General António Guterres, that the Dutch delegation would "focus on themes such as justice and the prevention of conflicts" during its tenure.

== Result ==
Here are the updated sections with the provided data:

=== African and Asia-Pacific Groups ===
African and Asia-Pacific Groups election results
Member	Round 1
Ivory Coast	189
Kuwait	188
Equatorial Guinea	185
Morocco	1
Guinea	1
valid ballots	192
abstentions	0
present and voting	192
required majority	128

=== Latin American and Caribbean Group ===
Latin American and Caribbean Group election results
Member	Round 1
Peru	186
Argentina	1
valid ballots	192
abstentions	5
present and voting	187
required majority	125

=== Eastern European Group ===
Eastern European Group election results
Member	Round 1
Poland	190
valid ballots	192
abstentions	2
present and voting	190
required majority	127

=== Western European and Others Group ===
Western European and Others Group election results
Member	Round 1
Netherlands	184
valid ballots	188
invalid ballots	4
abstentions	4
present and voting	184
required majority	123

== See also ==
- List of members of the United Nations Security Council
