= 2015 United Nations Security Council election =

Election to the United Nations Security Council

- 15 October 2015

5 of 10 non-permanent seats on the United Nations Security Council
- United Nations Security Council membership after the election Permanent members Non-permanent members
- Outgoing members Chad (Africa) Nigeria (Africa) Jordan (Asia–Pacific)^{a} Chile (GRULAC) Lithuania (EEG) a. Arab state Elected members Senegal (Africa) Egypt (Africa)^{a} Japan (Asia–Pacific) Uruguay (GRULAC) Ukraine (EEG)

The 2015 United Nations Security Council election was held on 15 October 2015 during the 70th session of the United Nations General Assembly, held at United Nations Headquarters in New York City. The elections are for five non-permanent seats on the UN Security Council for two-year mandates commencing on 1 January 2016. In accordance with the Security Council's rotation rules, whereby the ten non-permanent UNSC seats rotate among the various regional blocs into which UN member states traditionally divide themselves for voting and representation purposes, the five available seats are allocated as follows:

- Two for the African Group (held by Chad and Nigeria)
- One for the Asia-Pacific Group (held by Jordan)
- One for the Latin American and Caribbean Group (held by Chile)
- One for the Eastern European Group (held by Lithuania)

The five members served on the Security Council for the 2016–17 period. The countries elected were Egypt, Senegal, Uruguay, Japan, and Ukraine. In each vote there were as many vacancies as there were candidates on the ballot.

This was the last time a Security Council election was held in the month of October. On 18 September 2014, the General Assembly adopted Resolution 68/307 to push the elections back to six months prior to the beginning of the newly elected Council members' terms.

== Candidates ==
=== African Group ===
- Egypt
- Senegal

=== Asia-Pacific Group ===
- Bangladesh — Withdrew on 6 September 2014 in favour of Japan.
- Japan

=== Latin American and Caribbean Group ===
- Uruguay

=== Eastern European Group ===
- Ukraine

== Result ==
=== African and Asia-Pacific Groups ===
African and Asia-Pacific Groups election results
Member	Round 1
Senegal	187
Japan	184
Egypt	179
valid ballots	191
invalid ballots	1
abstentions	1
present and voting	190
required majority	127

=== Latin American and Caribbean Group ===
Latin American and Caribbean Group election results
Member	Round 1
Uruguay	185
valid ballots	191
invalid ballots	1
abstentions	6
present and voting	185
required majority	124

=== Eastern European Group ===
Eastern European Group election results
Member	Round 1
Ukraine	177
valid ballots	191
invalid ballots	1
abstentions	14
present and voting	177
required majority	118

== See also ==
- List of members of the United Nations Security Council
- Japan and the United Nations
