= 1948 United Nations Security Council election =

Election to the United Nations Security Council

- 8 October 1948

three of six non-permanent seats on the United Nations Security Council
Members and seats before election
Colombia
(Latin American)
Belgium
(Western European)
Syrian Republic
(Middle Eastern)
New members and seats
Republic of Cuba
(Latin American)
Norway
(Western European)
Kingdom of Egypt
(Middle Eastern)

The 1948 United Nations Security Council election was held on 8 October during the third session of the United Nations General Assembly, held in Paris, France. The General Assembly elected three members through consultation of the president as non-permanent members of the UN Security Council for two-year mandates commencing on 1 January 1949.

== Rules ==
The Security Council had 11 seats, filled by five permanent members and six non-permanent members before 1967. Each year, half of the non-permanent members were elected for two-year terms. A sitting member could not immediately run for re-election.

In order to earn a seat, nations had to win a vote total of at least two thirds of the number of countries casting votes. In the early years of the United Nations, the regional seat grouping were described as "gentlemen's agreements" between the five permanent members, and details such as which nations were eligible for certain groupings were not strictly defined.

== Result ==
At this time, the United Nations had 58 member states. In the first round, there were nine nations receiving votes for three seats.

=== Vote ===
The four rounds of balloting were held on 8 October 1948 at the 149th plenary meeting of the General Assembly.

Member	Round 1	Round 2	Round 3	Round 4
Republic of Cuba	52	—	—	—
Norway	44	—	—	—
Egypt	30	34	36	38
Turkey	23	20	19	19
Denmark	3	—	—	—
Pakistan	2	—	—	—
New Zealand	1	—	—	—
Siam	1	—	—	—
Sweden	1	—	—	—

Cuba was elected unanimously on the first ballot, with Norway also receiving enough votes to secure the Western European Seat. As Egypt and Turkey were the states with the highest number of votes contesting the Middle Eastern seat, in accordance with the rules, consecutive rounds of restricted voting would commence. In these rounds, only the two states that have attained the highest number of votes in the previous round (Egypt and Turkey) could be voted on, and any other votes would be considered invalid.

After four rounds of voting, Egypt secured 38 votes to earn the final seat. It would be Egypt's second time serving, after having served for one year following the January 1946 United Nations Security Council election. Egyptian foreign minister Ahmed Mohamed Khashaba Pasha said after the vote that Egypt would represent all Arab nations including Turkey, and said that the vote should be called an "Arab victory".

== See also ==
- List of members of the United Nations Security Council
- Category:Cuba and the United Nations (5)
- Category:Norway and the United Nations (7)
- Category:Egypt and the United Nations (12)
