= 1983 United Nations Security Council election =

Election to the United Nations Security Council

- 31 October 1983

5 of 10 non-permanent seats on the United Nations Security Council
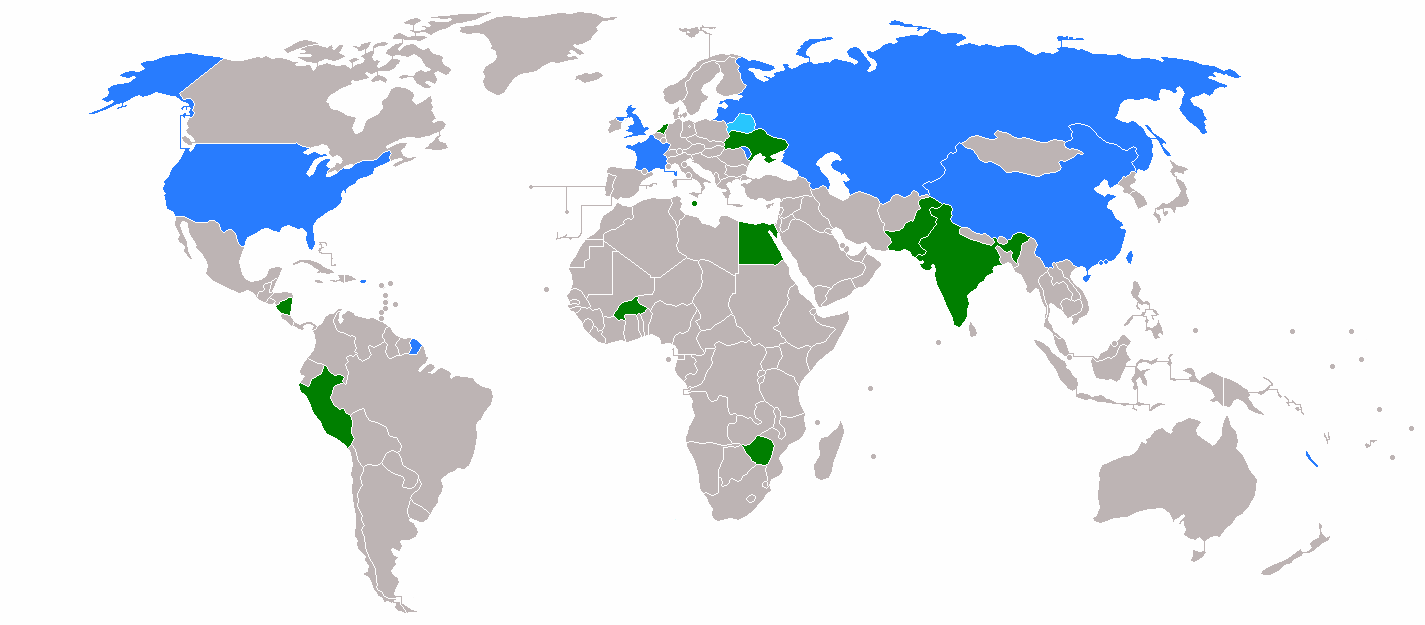
- United Nations Security Council membership after the election Permanent members Non-permanent members
- Outgoing members Togo (Africa) Zaire (Africa) Jordan (Asia)^{a} Guyana (GRULAC) Poland (EEG) a. Arab state Elected members Upper Volta (Africa) Egypt (Africa)^{a} India (Asia) Peru (GRULAC) Ukrainian SSR (EEG)

- Unsuccessful candidates
- Algeria (Africa)
- Barbados (GRULAC)

The 1983 United Nations Security Council election was held on 31 October 1983 during the Thirty-eighth session of the United Nations General Assembly, held at United Nations Headquarters in New York City. The General Assembly elected Egypt, India, Peru, the Ukrainian SSR, and Upper Volta (now Burkina Faso; first election), as the five new non-permanent members of the UN Security Council for two-year mandates commencing on 1 January 1984.

== Rules ==
The Security Council has 15 seats, filled by five permanent members and ten non-permanent members. Each year, half of the non-permanent members are elected for two-year terms. A sitting member may not immediately run for re-election.

In accordance with the rules whereby the ten non-permanent UNSC seats rotate among the various regional blocs into which UN member states traditionally divide themselves for voting and representation purposes, the five available seats are allocated as follows:

- Two for African countries, one of which being the "Arab Swing Seat" (held by Togo and Zaire)
- One for the Asian Group (now the Asia-Pacific Group) (held by Jordan)
- One for Latin American and Caribbean Group (GRULAC) (held by Guyana)
- One for the Eastern European Group (held by Poland)

To be elected, a candidate must receive a two-thirds majority of those present and voting. If the vote is inconclusive after the first round, three rounds of restricted voting shall take place, followed by three rounds of unrestricted voting, and so on, until a result has been obtained. In restricted voting, only official candidates may be voted on, while in unrestricted voting, any member of the given regional group, with the exception of current Council members, may be voted on.

== Representation of Grenada ==
The United States having initiated Operation Urgent Fury just six days prior to the election, questions were raised as to the legitimacy of the Grenadian delegation. The United States, supported by several other delegations, formally objected to the presence of the Grenadian delegate, stating that Sir Paul Scoon Governor-General of Grenada had informed the Secretary-General that no one was authorised to represent Grenada before the UN and that no credentials for the Thirty-eighth session of the General Assembly had been presented by Grenada.

The Grenadian delegate responded by stating that last he heard, Scoon was in American custody and that his delegation was treating him as a potential hostage. He added that "should someone want to make [him] leave the room, they would have to resort to the use of force."

== Endorsed candidates ==
Syria, speaking for the Asian Group, formally endorsed India.

== Result ==
Voting was conducted on a single ballot. Ballots containing more states from a certain region than seats allocated to that region were invalidated. The first and only round of balloting was held on 31 October 1983 at the 40th plenary meeting of the General Assembly. There were 155 total votes received.

Member	Round 1
Upper Volta	145
India	142
Ukrainian SSR	130
Egypt	125
Peru	106
Barbados	38
Algeria	24
Mexico	4
Yugoslavia	2
Argentina	1
Bahamas	1
Bangladesh	1
Bulgaria	1
Byelorussian SSR	1
Cuba	1
Libya	1
Mongolia	1
Abstentions	0
Invalid ballots	0
Required majority	104
Total ballots received	155

== See also ==
- List of members of the United Nations Security Council
- India and the United Nations
- Soviet Union and the United Nations
