= January 1946 United Nations Security Council election =

Election to the United Nations Security Council

- 12 January 1946

All six non-permanent seats on the United Nations Security Council
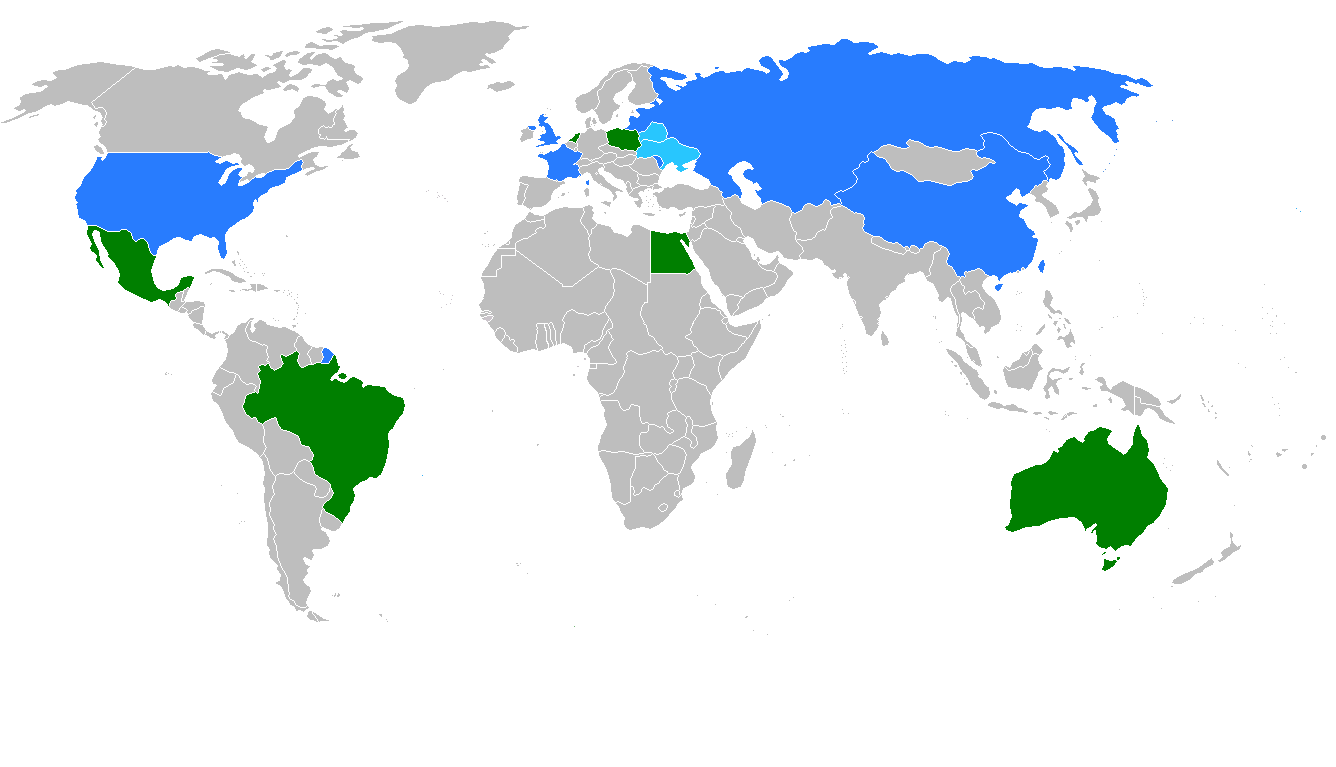
- Composition of the UNSC after the 1946 January election
Elected Members Australia Brazil Egypt Mexico Netherlands Poland

The first ever United Nations Security Council elections were held on 12 January 1946 during the 1st session of the United Nations General Assembly, held at Westminster Central Hall in the City of Westminster, London, England, United Kingdom. The elections were for six non-permanent seats on the UN Security Council for two- and one-year mandates commencing immediately upon election, and to expire on January 1st of 1947 and of 1948 upon the assumption of office of successors elected in November 1946 and September 1947, respectively.

== Voting on membership ==
The election was managed by the then-President of the United Nations General Assembly Paul-Henri Spaak of Belgium. All 51 then-members were to write the names of the six nations they wished to elect to the Security Council. No previous candidacies were made. New Zealand expressed its wishes for a member from the South Pacific to be elected, with Australia being the "obvious choice" in their opinion, and themselves refraining from candidacy. The representative of the Ukrainian Soviet Socialist Republic made a proposal for the membership to be elected, consisting of Brazil, Egypt, Mexico, New Zealand, Norway, and Poland. Following this proposal, the representatives of both New Zealand and Norway declined of candidating themselves.

The results of the votes were as follows:

First round

With 50 valid and one not valid papers, one paper being valid with only 4 names on it:

Elected to Council
Selected for run-off

First-round vote
Nation	Votes
Brazil	47
Egypt	45
Mexico	45
Poland	39
Netherlands	37
Canada	33
Australia	28
Iran	6
Norway	5
Czechoslovakia	4
Denmark	2
Belgium	1
Ethiopia	1
Greece	1
Luxembourg	1
New Zealand	1
Turkey	1
Yugoslavia	1
Invalid	1

This resulted in the election of Brazil, Egypt, Mexico, the Netherlands, and Poland to the Council, all of them having achieved the requisite two-thirds majority of 34 votes. One seat remained to be filled, and the rules required for that one nation to be elected from the two most successful candidates not elected; that is, Australia or Canada. This was to be decided upon in a second vote.

Second round

With 50 valid and one not valid papers:

Second-round vote
Nation	Votes
Australia	27
Canada	23
Invalid	1

This round was inconclusive, as neither nation obtained the required 34 votes.

Third round

With 51 valid papers:

Third-round vote
Nation	Votes
Australia	28
Canada	23

This round was also inconclusive, however, Canada then retired its candidacy.

Fourth round

With 49 valid and two not valid papers:

Elected to Council

Fourth-round vote
Nation	Votes
Australia	46
Canada	3
Invalid	2

Australia was thus elected as the sixth non-permanent member of the United Nations Security Council.

== Voting on term length ==
After the six members were elected, a second vote was to decide which states were to serve for a one-year, and which for a two-year term. This was to divide the membership of the Council in two groups by phase of their terms, so that not all members would have to be elected at the same time. All 51 then-members were to vote for the nations they wished to elect for a two-year term, with those not achieving the required number of votes left to serve a one-year term. During the meeting, it was decided that a simple majority was sufficient to ensure election. The voting results were as follows:

First round

With 47 valid and 4 not valid papers:

Selected for two-year term
Selected for run-off

First-round two-year term length vote
Nation	Votes
Brazil	41
Australia	31
Netherlands	23
Poland	19
Egypt	16
Mexico	11
Invalid	4

Australia and Brazil won a simple majority of over 24 votes, thus securing two-year mandates, and the third such mandate is to be assigned to either the Netherlands or Poland in a new round of voting.

Second round

With 50 valid and one not valid papers:

Second-round two-year term length vote
Nation	Votes
Netherlands	25
Poland	25
Invalid	1

With the two candidates having obtained the same number of votes, and the requisite majority being 26 votes, the rules called for the President of the General Assembly to draw lots. This was done, and Poland was drawn. This gave the following end result: Australia, Brazil, and Poland were to serve until the September 1947 election for the United Nations Security Council, with a two-year term, and Egypt, Mexico, and the Netherlands until the September 1946 elections, with a one-year term.

== See also ==
- List of members of the United Nations Security Council
- Australia and the United Nations
- Brazil and the United Nations
- Mexico and the United Nations
