= General debate of the sixty-ninth session of the United Nations General Assembly =

United Nations General Debate Assembly

General Debate of the sixty-ninth session of the United Nations General Assembly
- 24 September – 1 October 2014 69th session 69th general debate

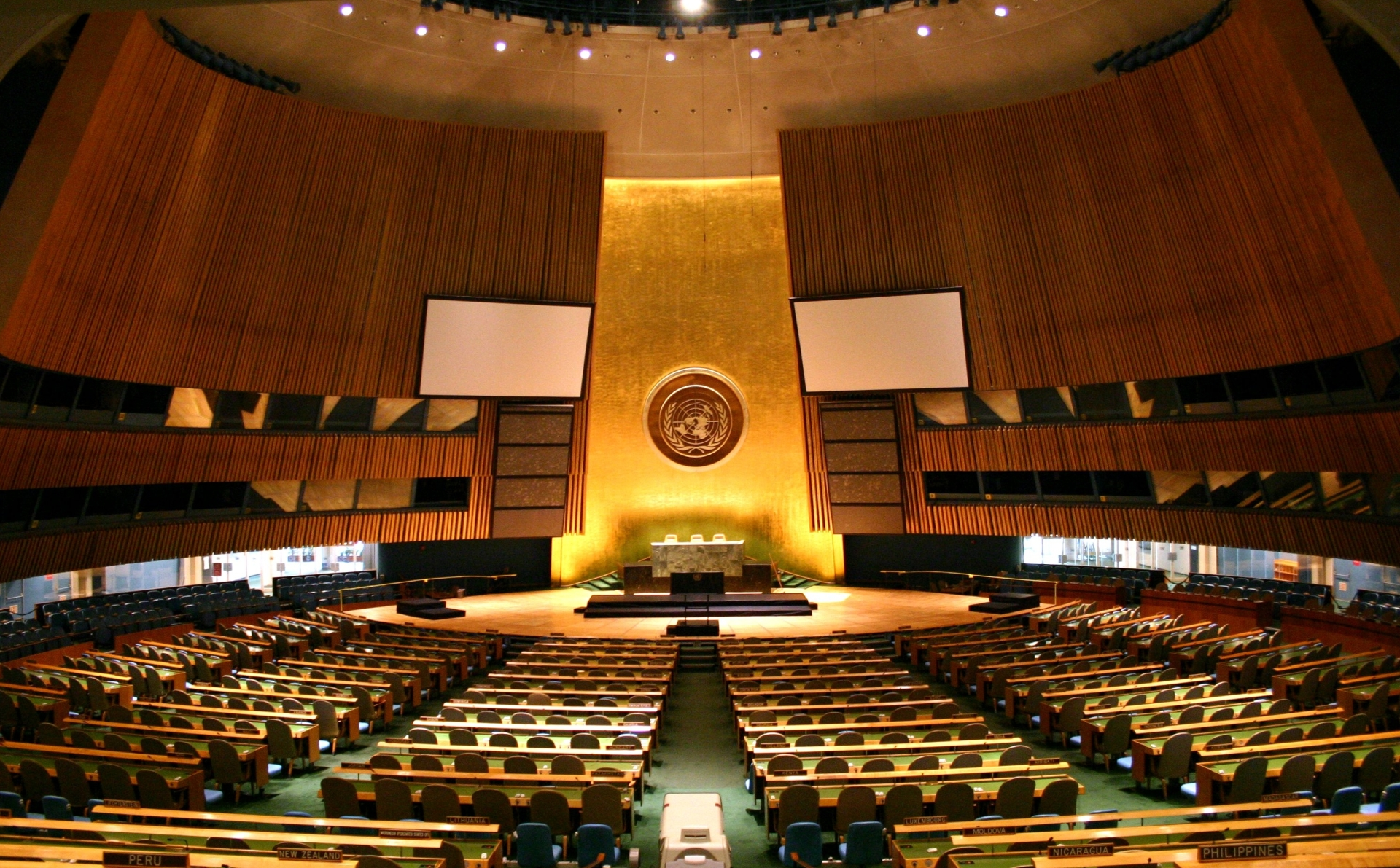
- General Assembly Hall at United Nations Headquarters, New York City
- Host country: United Nations
- Cities: New York City, United States
- Venues: General Assembly Hall at the United Nations Headquarters
- Participants: United Nations Member States
- President: Sam Kutesa
- Secretary-General: Ban Ki-moon
- Website: gadebate.un.org/en/sessions-archive/69

The General debate of the sixty-ninth session of the United Nations General Assembly commenced on 24 September 2014 and ended on 1 October 2014. Leaders from a number of member states addressed the UNGA.

== Organisation and subjects ==
The order of speakers is given first to member states, then observer states and supranational bodies. Any other observers entities will have a chance to speak at the end of the debate, if they so choose. Speakers will be put on the list in the order of their request, with special consideration for ministers and other government officials of similar or higher rank. According to the rules in place for the General Debate, the statements should be in of the United Nations official languages of Arabic, Chinese, English, French, Russian or Spanish, and will be translated by the United Nations translators. Each speaker is requested to provide 20 advance copies of their statements to the conference officers to facilitate translation and to be presented at the podium. Though there is no time limit for speeches, a voluntary guideline of 15 minutes is requested. The chosen theme for the debate is "Delivering on and Implementing a Transformative post-2015 Development Agenda."

== Speaking schedule ==
The rest of the speaking schedule in the General Assembly Chamber is as follows:

=== 24 September ===
Morning schedule

- United Nations – Secretary-General Ban Ki-moon
- United Nations – 69th Session of the United Nations General Assembly – President Sam Kutesa
- Brazil – President Dilma Rousseff
- United States – President Barack Obama
- Uganda – President Yoweri Museveni
- Spain – King Felipe VI
- Mauritania – President Mohamed Ould Abdel Aziz
- Chile – President Michelle Bachelet
- South Korea – President Park Geun-hye
- Qatar – Emir Tamim bin Hamad Al Thani
- Armenia – President Serzh Sargsyan
- Egypt – President Abdel Fattah el-Sisi
- Jordan – King Abdullah II
- France – President François Hollande
- Mexico – President Enrique Peña Nieto
- Finland – President Sauli Niinistö
- Indonesia – President Susilo Bambang Yudhoyono
- Argentina – President Cristina Fernández de Kirchner
- Turkey – President Recep Tayyip Erdoğan

Afternoon schedule

- Bolivia – President Evo Morales
- Rwanda – President Paul Kagame
- Dominican Republic – President Danilo Medina
- Kenya – President Uhuru Kenyatta
- Costa Rica – President Luis Guillermo Solís
- Mongolia – President Tsakhiagiin Elbegdorj
- Nigeria – President Goodluck Jonathan
- Honduras – President Juan Orlando Hernández
- Montenegro – President Filip Vujanović
- South Africa – President Jacob Zuma
- Switzerland –President Didier Burkhalter
- Chad – President Idriss Déby
- Estonia – President Toomas Hendrik Ilves
- Equatorial Guinea – President Teodoro Obiang Nguema Mbasogo
- Sri Lanka – President Mahinda Rajapaksa
- Venezuela – President Nicolás Maduro
- United Kingdom – Prime Minister David Cameron
- Denmark – Prime Minister Helle Thorning-Schmidt
- Ukraine – Prime Minister Arseniy Yatsenyuk
- Turkmenistan – Prime Minister Rashid Meredov

=== 25 September ===
Morning schedule

- Niger – President Mahamadou Issoufou
- Slovakia – President Andrej Kiska
- Ghana – President John Dramani Mahama
- Iran – President Hassan Rouhani
- Slovakia – President Andrej Kiska (scheduled)
- Ghana – President John Dramani Mahama (scheduled)
- Tunisia – President Moncef Marzouki
- Colombia – President Juan Manuel Santos
- Madagascar – President Hery Rajaonarimampianina
- Croatia – President Ivo Josipović
- Brunei – Sultan Hassanal Bolkiah
- Zimbabwe – President Robert Mugabe
- Peru – President Ollanta Humala
- Japan – Prime Minister Shinzo Abe
- Ethiopia – Prime Minister Hailemariam Desalegn
- Italy – Prime Minister Matteo Renzi
- European Union – President Herman Van Rompuy
- Antigua and Barbuda – Prime Minister Gaston Browne
- Kuwait – Prime Minister Jaber Al-Mubarak Al-Hamad Al-Sabah
- Romania – Prime Minister Victor Ponta
- Australia – Prime Minister Tony Abbott

Afternoon schedule

- Gambia – President Yahya Jammeh
- Poland – President Bronisław Komorowski
- Latvia – President Andris Bērziņš
- Gabon – President Ali Bongo Ondimba
- Panama – President Juan Carlos Varela
- Democratic Republic of the Congo – President Joseph Kabila
- Bulgaria – President Rossen Plevneliev
- Albania – President Bujar Nishani
- Hungary – President János Áder
- Malawi – President Peter Mutharika
- Seychelles – President James Michel (scheduled)
- Nauru – President Baron Waqa
- Palau – President Tommy Remengesau
- Tanzania – President Jakaya Mrisho Kikwete
- Canada – Prime Minister Stephen Harper
- Netherlands – Prime Minister Mark Rutte
- Tajikistan – Prime Minister Kokhir Rasulzoda
- Timor-Leste – Prime Minister Xanana Gusmão
- Norway – Prime Minister Erna Solberg
- Morocco – Prime Minister Abdelilah Benkirane
- Moldova – Deputy Prime Minister Natalia Gherman
- Cameroon – Foreign Minister Pierre Moukoko Mbonjo
- Senegal – Foreign Minister Mankeur Ndiaye

=== 26 September ===
Morning schedule

- Namibia – President Hifikepunye Pohamba
- Guyana – President Donald Rabindranauth Ramotar
- Cyprus – President Nicos Anastasiades
- Lithuania – President Dalia Grybauskaitė
- Ivory Coast – President Alassane Ouattara
- Slovenia – President Borut Pahor
- Guinea – President Alpha Condé
- El Salvador – President Salvador Sánchez Cerén
- Congo – President Denis Sassou Nguesso
- Palestine – President Mahmoud Abbas
- Bosnia and Herzegovina – Member of the Presidency Nebojša Radmanović
- Samoa – Prime Minister Tuilaepa Sailele Malielegaoi
- Iraq – President Mohammed Fuad Masum
- Luxembourg – Prime Minister Xavier Bettel
- Pakistan – Prime Minister Muhammad Nawaz Sharif
- Malta – Prime Minister Joseph Muscat
- Lebanon – Acting President/Prime Minister Tammam Salam
- Malaysia – Prime Minister Mohammed Najib bin Tun Haji Abdul Razak

Afternoon schedule

- Somalia – President Hassan Sheikh Mohamud
- Serbia – President Tomislav Nikolić
- Haiti – President Michel Joseph Martelly
- Micronesia – President Emanuel Mori
- Dominica – President Charles Savarin
- Republic of Macedonia – President Gjorge Ivanov
- Comoros – President Ikililou Dhoinine
- Marshall Islands – President Christopher Loeak
- Kiribati – President Anote Tong
- Nepal – Prime Minister Sushil Koirala
- Georgia – Prime Minister Irakli Garibashvili
- Belgium – Prime Minister Elio Di Rupo
- Trinidad and Tobago – Prime Minister Kamla Persad-Bissessar
- Azerbaijan – Foreign Minister Elmar Mammadyarov
- Kazakhstan – Foreign Minister Erlan Idrissov
- Uzbekistan – Foreign Minister Abdulaziz Kamilov
- Sudan – Foreign Minister Ali Ahmed Karti
- Guatemala – Foreign Minister Carlos Raúl Morales
- Zambia – Foreign Minister Harry Kalaba

=== 27 September ===
Morning schedule

- Tonga – King Tupou VI
- Mali – President Ibrahim Boubacar Keïta
- Central African Republic – President Catherine Samba-Panza
- South Sudan – President Salva Kiir
- Burundi – Vice President Prosper Bazombanza
- India – Prime Minister Narendra Modi (Note: First speech to the UNGA General Debate.)
- Bangladesh – Prime Minister Sheikh Hasina
- Fiji – Prime Minister Frank Bainimarama
- Tuvalu – Prime Minister Enele Sopoaga
- Libya – President of the House of Representatives Agila Saleh Essa Gwaider (Note: The government of Libya is disputed between a parliament sitting in the traditional capital of Tripoli and another that is temporarily sitting in Tobruk.)
- Thailand – Deputy Prime Minister General Tanasak Patimapragorn
- Germany – Foreign Minister Frank-Walter Steinmeier
- Russia – Foreign Minister Sergey Lavrov
- China – Foreign Minister Wang Yi
- San Marino – Foreign Minister Pasquale Valentini
- United Arab Emirates – Foreign Minister Abdullah Bin Zayed Al Nahyan
- Cuba – Foreign Minister Bruno Rodríguez Parrilla
- Austria – Foreign Minister Sebastian Kurz

Afternoon schedule

- Andorra – Prime Minister Antoni Martí Petit
- Vietnam – Deputy Prime Minister Pham Binh Minh
- Greece – Deputy Prime Minister Evangelos Venizelos
- North Korea – Foreign Minister Ri Su Yong
- Algeria – Foreign Minister Ramtane Lamamra
- Mozambique – Foreign Minister Oldemiro Balói
- Portugal – Foreign Minister Rui Machete
- Czech Republic – Foreign Minister Lubomír Zaorálek
- Jamaica – Foreign Minister Arnold Nicholson
- Afghanistan – Foreign Minister Zarar Ahmad Osmani

=== 29 September ===
Morning schedule

- Sao Tome and Principe – Prime Minister Gabriel Arcanjo Ferreira da Costa
- Angola – Vice President Manuel Vicente
- Swaziland – Prime Minister Barnabas Sibusiso Dlamini
- Guinea-Bissau – Prime Minister Domingos Simões Pereira
- Vanuatu – Prime Minister Joe Natuman
- Holy See – Secretary of State Cardinal Pietro Parolin
- Syria – Deputy Prime Minister Walid Al-Moualem
- Laos – Deputy Prime Minister Thongloun Sisoulith
- Bahrain – Foreign Minister Khalid bin Ahmed Al Khalifa
- Liechtenstein – Foreign Minister Aurelia Frick
- Israel – Prime Minister Benjamin Netanyahu
- Iceland – Foreign Minister Gunnar Bragi Sveinsson
- Botswana – Foreign Minister Phandu Skelemani
- Myanmar – Foreign Minister Wunna Maung Lwin
- Philippines – Foreign Minister Albert Del Rosario

Afternoon schedule

- Burkina Faso – Foreign Minister Djibrill Ypènè Bassolé
- Cambodia – Deputy Prime Minister Hor Namhong
- New Zealand – Foreign Minister Murray McCully
- Singapore – Foreign Minister K. Shanmugam
- Ireland – Foreign Minister Charles Flanagan
- Uruguay – Foreign Minister Luis Almagro
- Monaco – Foreign Minister José Badia
- Sierra Leone – Foreign Minister Samura Kamara
- Liberia – Foreign Minister Augustine Kpehe Ngafuan
- Grenada – Foreign Minister Nickolas Steele
- St. Vincent and the Grenadines – Foreign Minister Camillo Gonsalves
- Yemen – Foreign Minister Jamal Abdullah Al-Sallal
- Lesotho – Foreign Minister Mohlabi Kenneth Tsekoa
- Seychelles – Foreign Minister Jean-Paul Adam
- St. Kitts and Nevis – Foreign Minister Patrice Nisbett
- Togo – Minister of State Robert Dussey
- Sweden – Permanent Representative Mårten Grunditz

=== 30 September ===
Morning schedule

- Suriname – Foreign Minister Winston Lackin
- Eritrea – Foreign Minister Osman Saleh Mohammed
- Oman – Foreign Minister Yusuf bin Alawi bin Abdullah
- Belarus – Foreign Minister Vladimir Makei
- Belize – Foreign Minister Wilfred Elrington
- Barbados – Foreign Minister Maxine Pamela Ometa McClean
- Nicaragua – Foreign Minister Samuel Santos López
- Maldives – Foreign Minister Mohamed Waheed
- Bahamas – Foreign Minister Frederick A. Mitchell
- Bhutan – Foreign Minister Lyonpo Rinzin Dorje
- St. Lucia – Foreign Minister Alva Romanus Baptiste
- Papua New Guinea – Foreign Minister Rimbink Pato
- Ecuador – Vice Minister of Foreign Affairs Leonardo Arizaga
- Benin – Permanent Representative Jean-Francis Régis Zinsou
- Solomon Islands – Permanent Representative Collin Beck
- Mauritius – Permanent Representative Milan Jaya Nyamrajsingh Meettarbhan
- Paraguay – Permanent Representative José Antonio Dos Santos
- Cape Verde – Foreign Minister Jorge Alberto Silva Borges

==== Right of Reply ====
Member states have the option to reply to comments on the day (or even to the days prior), but are limited to 10 minutes for the first response and five minutes for the second response. All speeches are made from the floor, as opposed to the podium for the General Debate.

Ukraine thanked other member states for support amidst the War in Donbass. It said it had provided personalised multimedia albums about the situation in the country and the need to maintain territorial integrity. It was surprised by statements from Russia saying the latter were trying to convince others about the "occupation of Crimea" which it claimed was an aggressive action instead of a reaction to the actions of the West. The delegation alleged that the truth was supposedly that Ukraine had nothing to do with the European Union or the West, including the United States, but that Russian barbarism caused the actions in Ukraine. Russia then "grabbed" Crimea and now resorts to some historical reasoning while violating international law. Instead it said the Kremlin launched the "brutal war" not against the West but Ukraine, which is weak and whose budget was shamelessly spoilt by the "corrupt regime" that was ousted earlier in the year. They said that Ukraine is a part of the E.U. family and is sovereign, democratic and in concern for human rights. The delegate said a UN resolution on the non-interference in states was adopted by the UNGA long time ago and was in 1981 it upheld the resolution which called for refraining from intervention directed against another state. The delegation concluded that it was time to start respecting the decisions of the UNGA and binding norms of international law. Finally, despite the aggressive action by Russia against Ukraine the people of the country shared commonalities.

Russia responded in saying that was just heard from Ukraine were unjustified accusations aimed at Russia. It is thus regrettable that Ukraine is striving to use "this high rostrum of the UN...to advance its ideas and perceptions that are far from the truth. The rhetoric of the Ukrainian delegation...not aligned to...[reality]." Russia's view to the events in Ukraine had been laid out earlier and does need to be repeated except that it seeks to. reestablish peace on the basis of a broad dialogue which Russia will assist in.

==== Closing remarks ====
President Sam Kutesa closed the General Debate for the year in summation of the comments. He said that the past week has been used to "share hopes and visions of the future," including the "challenges confronting us." He thanked each and every speaker: 117 heads of state and government, 3 vice president's, 56 ministers, 27 chairs of delegations and 1 head of state/observer state; this has indicated the importance attached to the organization and the event.

The topics focused on the theme of the debate by many speakers, particularly to build on momentum so as to provide tangible benefits. Several speakers also called for addressed the need for more global commitments. Yet other topics included: many calls for a fair global trading regime and better global economic governance; peace and security issues that are prominent, including the many speakers who talked of increased threats by "terrorists" like ISIS, Al Qaeda, Al Shabaab and Boko Haram which indicated a need to such groups; there were calls to optimise synergy between the UN and regional organisations; the 2014 West African Ebola outbreak also took prominence with calls for more coordinated action, expressions of serious concern were given in regards to the loss of life and social effects, particularly in Liberia and Sierra Leone; promote of the rule of law, good governance and respect for human rights was also emphasised, including international law norms and principles, peace and security and human rights as one of the UN's pillars; many also reiterated calls for UNSC reform.

As such, he Kutesa concluded that the UNGA serves as important international forum to come together and explore world affairs. It thus serves as a one of a kind institution. The UNGA on the global stage serves as a unique opportunity for mutual engagements. He notably suggested the addition of sideline meetings to focus on the discussed matters during the General Debate. Finally he called for the delegations to approach the upcoming year's work in the spirit of cooperation to make a difference and that "as seen at the General Debate, the work is cut out for us" and there is then a need to take on responsibility and challenges to make a "real and meaningful change." With that, he concluded the agenda item number eight.

== See also ==
- List of UN General Assembly sessions
- List of General debates of the United Nations General Assembly
