= Sixty-ninth session of the United Nations General Assembly =

Sixty-ninth Session of the United Nations General Assembly
- 16 September 2014 – 15 September 2015 69th session 69th general debate
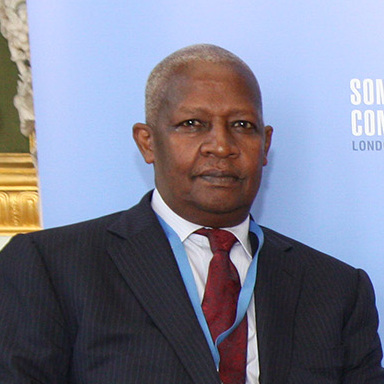
- President of the 69th General Assembly; Sam Kutesa
- Host country: United Nations
- Cities: New York City
- Venues: General Assembly Hall at the United Nations Headquarters
- Participants: Member States of the United Nations
- Secretary-General: Ban Ki-moon
- Website: www.un.org/en/ga/69

The Sixty-Ninth session of the United Nations General Assembly opened on 16 September 2014. The President of the United Nations General Assembly was chosen from the African Group with Uganda's Sam Kutesa being the unanimous African Union's Executive Council's candidate, thus bypassing the need for an election.

== Organisation for the session ==
On 2 May 2013, the African Union's Executive Council unanimously voted to have Ugandan Foreign Minister Sam Kutesa as the president of the United Nations General Assembly after Cameroonian Foreign Minister Pierre Moukoko withdrew, thus not necessitating an election. He was official elected by the UNGA on 11 June 2014. Kutesa was formally elected on 11 June 2014.

As is tradition during each session of the General Assembly, Secretary-General Ban Ki-moon will draw lots to see which member state would take the helm at the first seat in the General Assembly Chamber, with the other member states would follow according to the English translation of their name, the same order would be followed in the six main committees.

On 11 June 2014, Secretary-General Ban Ki-moon drew lots for the Member State to occupy the first seat in the General Assembly Hall during the Assembly's sixty-ninth session. Cuba was selected in the drawing. Member States will be assigned seats in English alphabetical order following Cuba.

The chairmen and officers of the six Main Committees will also be elected: First Committee (Disarmament and International Security Committee);Second Committee (Economic and Financial Committee); Third Committee (Social, Humanitarian and Cultural Committee); Fourth Committee (Special Political and Decolonization Committee); Fifth Committee (Administrative and Budgetary Committee); and the Sixth Committee (Legal Committee) .

There will also be nineteen vice-presidents of the UNGA.

=== General debate ===
Most states will have a representative speaking about issues concerning their country and the hopes for the coming year as to what the UNGA will do. This is as opportunity for the member states to opine on international issues of their concern. The General Debate will begin on 24 September and end on run until 1 October with the exception of 28 September, a Sunday.

The order of speakers is given first to member states, then observer states and supranational bodies. Any other observers entities will have a chance to speak at the end of the debate, if they so choose. Speakers will be put on the list in the order of their request, with special consideration for ministers and other government officials of similar or higher rank. According to the rules in place for the General Debate, the statements should be in one of the United Nations official languages of Arabic, Chinese, English, French, Russian or Spanish, and will be translated by the United Nations translators. Each speaker is requested to provide 20 advance copies of their statements to the conference officers to facilitate translation and to be presented at the podium. Speeches are requested to be limited to five minutes, with seven minutes for supranational bodies. President Sam Kutesa chose the theme for the debate as Delivering on and Implementing a Transformative post-2015 Development Agenda."

== Resolutions ==
Resolutions will come before the UNGA between October 2014 and summer 2015.

== Elections ==
The election of non-permanent members to the Security Council for 2015–2016 was held on 16 October 2014. Outgoing members were: Angola, Malaysia, New Zealand, Spain, and Venezuela.

An election to choose 18 members of the United Nations Human Rights Council for a three-year term will take place.

== See also ==
- List of UN General Assembly sessions
- List of General debates of the United Nations General Assembly
