= Sérgio França Danese =

Brazilian diplomat (born 1954)

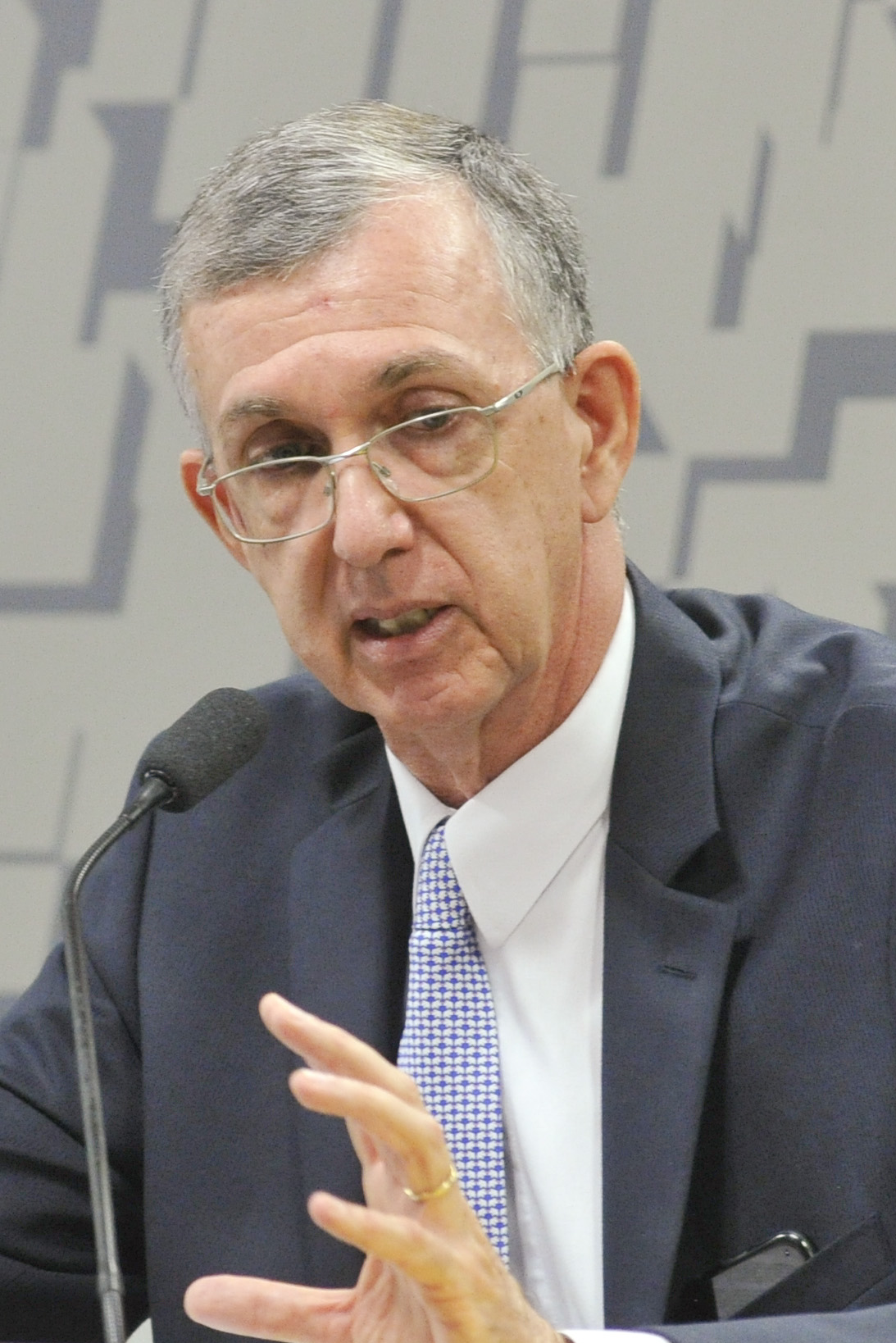
- Danese in 2016

Brazilian Ambassador to the United Nations
- Incumbent
- Assumed office 6 July 2023
- President: Luiz Inácio Lula da Silva
- Preceded by: Ronaldo Costa Filho

President of the United Nations Security Council
- In office 2 October 2023 – 1 November 2023
- Preceded by: Ferit Hoxha
- Succeeded by: Zhang Jun

Personal details
- Born: 1954 (age 71–72) São Paulo, Brazil
- Education: Faculty of Philosophy, Languages and Human Sciences, University of São Paulo (BLitt)
- Profession: Diplomat, writer

Sérgio França Danese (born 1954) is a Brazilian writer and diplomat. In 2023, he was nominated by president Luiz Inácio Lula da Silva to become the Brazilian Ambassador to the United Nations in New York City.

== Biography ==
=== Early years and academic history ===
Danese was born in São Paulo in 1954. He joined the Letters course of the Faculty of Philosophy, Languages and Human Sciences (FFLCH) of the University of São Paulo (USP), where he graduated in 1976. Danese then moved to México, where he got a post-graduation in Latin Letters at the National Autonomous University of Mexico (UNAM).

=== Diplomacy ===
Danese began his diplomatic career in 1981, becoming student of Rio Branco Institute (IRBr). From 1985 to 1987, he had served as special advisor of the Presidency of the Republic during José Sarney administration. Between 1990 and 1992, Danese worked with the Ministry of Foreign Affairs in Mexico. In 1993, he became advisor to Rubens Ricupero, while he had served as Ministry of Environment during the presidency of Itamar Franco. Ricupero was Danese's teacher during his studies at IRBr.

With a long diplomatic career, Danese had served as the Brazilian ambassador to Algeria, Argentina and South Africa. In 2021, he was nominated as ambassador to Peru, where he headed the diplomatic mission until 2023. After the election of Lula da Silva, the Brazilian president nominated him to represent Brazil in the United Nations. Danese replaced Ronaldo Costa Filho, nominated by former president Jair Bolsonaro.

During the Gaza war, he gained international notoriety. On the verge of a conflict, Brazil presided the United Nations Security Council. The country proposed a ceasefire for humanitarian aid in Gaza and a humanitarian corridor for Palestinian civilians to Egypt. Besides Brazilian efforts, the United States Ambassador to the United Nations, Linda Thomas-Greenfield, vetoed the resolution. The Brazilian proposal got 12 favorable votes, 2 abstentions – Russia and the United Kingdom – and the American veto, blocking a ceasefire and the arrival of humanitarian aid.

== Books ==
- Ricupero, Rubens; França Danese, Sérgio (1998). O ponto ótimo da crise (in Brazilian Portuguese). Rio de Janeiro: Editora Revan. ISBN 8571061513.
- França Danese, Sérgio (1999). Diplomacia presidencial: história e crítica (in Brazilian Portuguese). Rio de Janeiro: Topbooks. ISBN 978-85-7631-680-0.
- França Danese, Sérgio (2003). A sombra do meio-dia (in Brazilian Portuguese). Rio de Janeiro: Topbooks. ISBN 978-8574750699.
- França Danese, Sérgio (2009). A escola da liderança: ensaios sobre a política externa e a inserção internacional do Brasil (in Brazilian Portuguese). Rio de Janeiro: Editora Record. ISBN 9788501085955.
- França Danese, Sérgio (2017). O outro lado da lua (in Brazilian Portuguese). Rio de Janeiro: Topbooks. ISBN 978-8574752686.

Diplomatic posts
Preceded by Ronaldo Costa Filho	Brazilian Ambassador to the United Nations; 2023–present	Incumbent
Preceded by (Albania) Ferit Hoxha	President of the United Nations Security Council; October–November 2023	Succeeded by (China) Zhang Jun
