= United Nations Credentials Committee =

The United Nations Credentials Committee is a committee of the United Nations General Assembly whose main purpose is to report to the Assembly regarding the credentials of the body's representatives.

== Background ==
Each year before the regular session begins, the Office of Legal Affairs recommends a group of candidates to the President of the General Assembly for the Credentials Committee. The President of the General Assembly then proposes nine candidates to the General Assembly, which then votes on the candidates.

According to Rule 27 of the Rules of Procedure of the General Assembly, Member States must send the credentials of their representatives to the Secretary-General of the United Nations more than one week before the opening of the regular session. When Members States send these credentials in, they are formally notifying the Secretary-General that these representatives are entitled to speak on their behalf. They must be sent by the head of state, head of government or by the minister for foreign affairs.

Rule 25 of the Rules of Procedure of the General Assembly also defines a "delegation" of a Member State as, "consist[ing] of up to five representatives, five alternate representatives, and as many advisers and experts as required." The General Assembly formally acknowledges the representatives of the Member States by approving their credentials.

In cases of special or emergency sessions of the General Assembly, as well as any conferences convened under its authority, the credentials committee is reconvened with "the same composition as that of the Credentials Committee at its most recent regular session."

The consideration of the credentials by the Credentials Committee is normally a formality. However, if a delegation's legitimacy is contested, its credentials may be challenged by another Member State. In these cases, the office of the President of the General Assembly is often called upon to help resolve the matter before a formal meeting of the Credentials Committee. Nonetheless, delegations whose credentials have been challenged retain all their rights until, and unless, they are revoked by the General Assembly. An example is the Taliban government of Afghanistan. After having come to power in contested circumstances the month before, the new government sought to speak at the UN General Assembly before the close of its session in September 2021: the Credential Committee did not meet to agree to accept new Afghan appointments before the end of the session. This left Ghulam Isaczai of the ousted regime as the official representative to the UN, despite Taliban protestations that he "no longer represents Afghanistan". On 1 December 2021, the Committee decided to reject recognition of UN seats for both Afghanistan's Taliban government and Myanmar's ruling Tatmadaw military junta. On 16 December 2022, the Committee decided again to reject recognition of UN seats for Afghanistan's Taliban government, Myanmar's Tatmadaw military junta and Libya's rival eastern-based government. On 6 December 2023, this was repeated for Afghanistan and Myanmar. On 20 November 2024, this was again repeated for Afghanistan and Myanmar. On 25 November 2025, this was again repeated for Afghanistan and Myanmar. In all five years, the Chair of the committee has proposed these decisions with no objections (unanimous consent).

== Members ==
An asterisk (*) denotes the Chair of the committee. (The committee did not submit a report naming a Chair in 1964.)

1946	Turkey	Saudi Arabia	Philippines	Republic of China	Byelorussian SSR	Haiti	Paraguay	France	Denmark*
1947	Iran*	Thailand	New Zealand	Czechoslovakia	Poland	Bolivia	Honduras	United Kingdom	Norway
1948	Iran	Burma	Canada	Yemen	Ukrainian SSR*	Brazil	Ecuador	France	Sweden
1949	Iran	Uruguay	South Africa	Byelorussian SSR	Soviet Union	Brazil	Cuba*	Belgium	United States
1950	Turkey	United Kingdom	India	Thailand	Soviet Union	Mexico	Chile	Belgium*	United States
1951	Iraq	Norway	Indonesia	New Zealand	Soviet Union	Byelorussian SSR	Bolivia*	France	United States
1952	Lebanon*	Sweden	Burma	New Zealand	Soviet Union	Panama	Paraguay	Belgium	United States
1953	Syria	United Kingdom	Indonesia	New Zealand*	Soviet Union	Cuba	Peru	Iceland	United States
1954	Lebanon	Pakistan	Burma	New Zealand	Soviet Union	El Salvador*	Uruguay	France	United States
1955	Iraq*	Afghanistan	Indonesia	Australia	Soviet Union	Dominican Republic	Colombia	France	United States
1956	Iraq	Spain	Burma	New Zealand*	Soviet Union	Brazil	Argentina	Netherlands	United States
1957	Liberia	United Kingdom	Burma	Canada	Soviet Union	Panama	Nicaragua	Iceland*	United States
1958	Tunisia	Union of South Africa	Nepal	Turkey	Soviet Union	Chile	Argentina*	France	United States
1959	Afghanistan	Italy	Pakistan	Australia	Soviet Union	Honduras	Ecuador*	France	United States
1960	United Arab Republic	Morocco	Philippines	New Zealand*	Soviet Union	Haiti	Costa Rica	Spain	United States
1961	Mali	Italy	Burma	Australia	Soviet Union	Nicaragua	Peru	Iceland*	United States
1962	Nigeria	Guinea	Indonesia	Canada	Soviet Union	El Salvador	Mexico	Greece*	United States
1963	Liberia*	Algeria	Nepal	Ireland	Soviet Union	Panama	Ecuador	Belgium	United States
1964	United Arab Republic	Madagascar	Cambodia	Australia	Soviet Union	Costa Rica	Guatemala	Iceland	United States
1965	United Arab Republic	Madagascar	Syria	Australia	Soviet Union	Costa Rica	Guatemala	Iceland*	United States
1966	Ivory Coast	Guinea	Nepal	Japan	Soviet Union	El Salvador	Nicaragua	Austria*	United States
1967	Mali	Madagascar	Ceylon	Japan	Soviet Union	Mexico	Paraguay	Ireland*	United States
1968	Liberia	Tanzania	Mongolia	New Zealand	Soviet Union	Costa Rica	Brazil	Austria*	United States
1969	Togo	Sudan	Mongolia	Thailand	Soviet Union	Nicaragua	Bolivia	Iceland*	United States
1970	Liberia	Mauritania	Poland	Australia	Soviet Union	Ireland*	Ecuador	Greece	United States
1971	Liberia	Somalia	Mongolia	Australia	Soviet Union	Ireland*	Colombia	France	United States
1972	Senegal	Tanzania	Japan	China	Soviet Union	Costa Rica*	Uruguay	Belgium	United States
1973	Senegal	Tanzania	Japan	China	Soviet Union	Nicaragua	Uruguay*	Greece	United States
1974	Senegal	Tanzania	Philippines*	China	Soviet Union	Costa Rica	Venezuela	Belgium	United States
1975	Libyan Arab Republic	Mali	Mongolia	China	Soviet Union	Costa Rica	Venezuela	Belgium*	United States
1976	Ivory Coast*	Zambia	Malaysia	China	Soviet Union	El Salvador	Ecuador	Netherlands	United States
1977	Nigeria	Madagascar	Nepal*	China	Soviet Union	Fiji	Ecuador	Canada	United States
1978	Sierra Leone	Zaire	India	China	Soviet Union	Thailand	Suriname*	Denmark	United States
1979	Senegal	Congo	Pakistan	China	Soviet Union	Panama	Ecuador	Belgium*	United States
1980	Angola	Kenya	Singapore	China	Soviet Union	Haiti	Costa Rica*	Spain	United States
1981	Niger*	Ghana	Papua New Guinea	China	Soviet Union	Panama	Paraguay	Netherlands	United States
1982	Nigeria	Seychelles	Nepal	China	Soviet Union	Bahamas*	Dominican Republic	New Zealand	United States
1983	Algeria	Colombia	Gabon	China	Soviet Union	Jamaica	Sri Lanka*	Zambia	United States
1984	Ivory Coast	Equatorial Guinea	Bhutan*	China	Soviet Union	Cuba	Paraguay	Italy	United States
1985	Burundi	Botswana	Papua New Guinea	China	Soviet Union	Suriname	Brazil	Canada*	United States
1986	Rwanda	Ghana	Fiji	China	Soviet Union	Bahamas	Venezuela*	Netherlands	United States
1987	Cape Verde	Kenya	Singapore	China	Soviet Union	Barbados	Argentina*	West Germany	United States
1988	Togo	Zimbabwe	Thailand	China	Soviet Union	Trinidad and Tobago	Bolivia	Luxembourg*	United States
1989	Malawi	Zaire*	Philippines	China	Soviet Union	Antigua and Barbuda	Colombia	Australia	United States
1990	Ivory Coast	Botswana	Nepal*	China	Soviet Union	Jamaica	Uruguay	Ireland	United States
1991	Togo	Lesotho	Singapore	China	Soviet Union	Belize	Chile	Belgium*	United States
1992	Kenya	Burundi	Papua New Guinea	China	Russia	Barbados*	Argentina	New Zealand	United States
1993	Ivory Coast	Mauritius	Thailand*	China	Russia	Bahamas	Ecuador	Austria	United States
1994	Togo	Namibia	Fiji	China	Russia	Suriname	Honduras	Portugal*	United States
1995	South Africa	Mali	Marshall Islands	China	Russia	Trinidad and Tobago*	Venezuela	Luxembourg	United States
1996	Sierra Leone	Gabon*	Philippines	China	Russia	Dominican Republic	Paraguay	Netherlands	United States
1997	Ivory Coast	Zambia	Bhutan	China	Russia	Barbados*	Argentina	Norway	United States
1998	Mali	Zimbabwe	Fiji	China	Russia	Jamaica	Venezuela	New Zealand*	United States
1999	Togo	South Africa	Philippines*	China	Russia	Trinidad and Tobago	Bolivia	Austria	United States
2000	Mauritius	Gabon*	Thailand	China	Russia	Bahamas	Ecuador	Ireland	United States
2001	Senegal	Lesotho	Singapore	China	Russia	Jamaica	Uruguay*	Denmark	United States
2002	Mali	Namibia	Papua New Guinea	China	Russia	Barbados	Argentina	Belgium*	United States
2003	Cape Verde	Ethiopia	Fiji*	China	Russia	Antigua and Barbuda	Costa Rica	New Zealand	United States
2004	Benin	Ghana*	Bhutan	China	Russia	Trinidad and Tobago	Uruguay	Liechtenstein	United States
2005	Sierra Leone	Cameroon	Samoa	China	Russia	Saint Lucia	Panama*	Portugal	United States
2006	Kenya	Madagascar	Tonga	China	Russia	Guyana	Peru	Monaco*	United States
2007	Angola	Namibia	Singapore*	China	Russia	Suriname	Chile	Switzerland	United States
2008	Mozambique	Botswana*	Cyprus	China	Russia	Saint Kitts and Nevis	Mexico	Luxembourg	United States
2009	Tanzania	Zambia	Philippines*	China	Russia	Jamaica	Brazil	Spain	United States
2010	Kenya	Gabon	Singapore*	China	Russia	Bahamas	Guatemala	Finland	United States
2011	Senegal	Egypt	Maldives	China	Russia	Panama*	Costa Rica	Italy	United States
2012	Angola	Seychelles	Thailand	China	Russia	Trinidad and Tobago*	Peru	Sweden	United States
2013	Tanzania	Gabon	Singapore	China	Russia	Guyana*	Colombia	Belgium	United States
2014	Namibia	Senegal	Bangladesh*	China	Russia	Jamaica	Brazil	Denmark	United States
2015	Ivory Coast	South Africa	Kazakhstan	China	Russia	Barbados	Argentina	Austria*	United States
2016	Malawi*	Cameroon	South Korea	China	Russia	Saint Lucia	Paraguay	Netherlands	United States
2017	Cape Verde	Uganda	Indonesia	China	Russia	Dominica	Uruguay	Ireland*	United States
2018	Sierra Leone	Ghana	Palau*	China	Russia	Antigua and Barbuda	Chile	Finland	United States
2019	Mauritius	Botswana	Nepal	China	Russia	Barbados*	Uruguay	San Marino	United States
2020	Tanzania*	Cameroon	Papua New Guinea	China	Russia	Trinidad and Tobago	Uruguay	Iceland	United States
2021	Namibia	Sierra Leone	Bhutan	China	Russia	Bahamas	Chile	Sweden*	United States
2022	Angola	Zambia	Maldives	China	Russia	Guyana*	Uruguay	Austria	United States
2023	Nigeria	Togo	Solomon Islands*	China	Russia	Grenada	Suriname	Andorra	United States
2024	Cabo Verde	Liberia	Laos	China	Russia	Antigua and Barbuda*	Dominica	Monaco	United States
2025	Botswana	Senegal*	Malaysia	China	Russia	Dominican Republic	Trinidad and Tobago	Andorra	United States

The rules of the General Assembly do not list any regional groups or permanent members for the committee (only stating that the committee has nine members), but the General Assembly has always appointed the above permanent members and regional groups (e.g. two members from the African Group) since 1972.

== See also ==
- United Nations General Committee
