= Brazil and the United Nations =

Federative Republic of Brazil

United Nations membership
- Membership: Full member
- Since: 24 October 1945
- Former name(s): United States of Brazil (1945–1967)
- UNSC seat: Non-permanent (G4 member)
- Permanent Representative: Sérgio França Danese

Brazil is a full member of the United Nations. It has participated in peacekeeping operations with the UN in the Middle East, the former Belgian Congo, Cyprus, Mozambique, Angola, and more recently East Timor and Haiti. Brazil has been regularly elected as a non-permanent member to the Security Council since its first session in 1946 and is now among the most elected UN member states to the UNSC. Brazil was elected to become a member of the 15-country UN Security Council for the two-year term of 2022–23.

== Activities ==
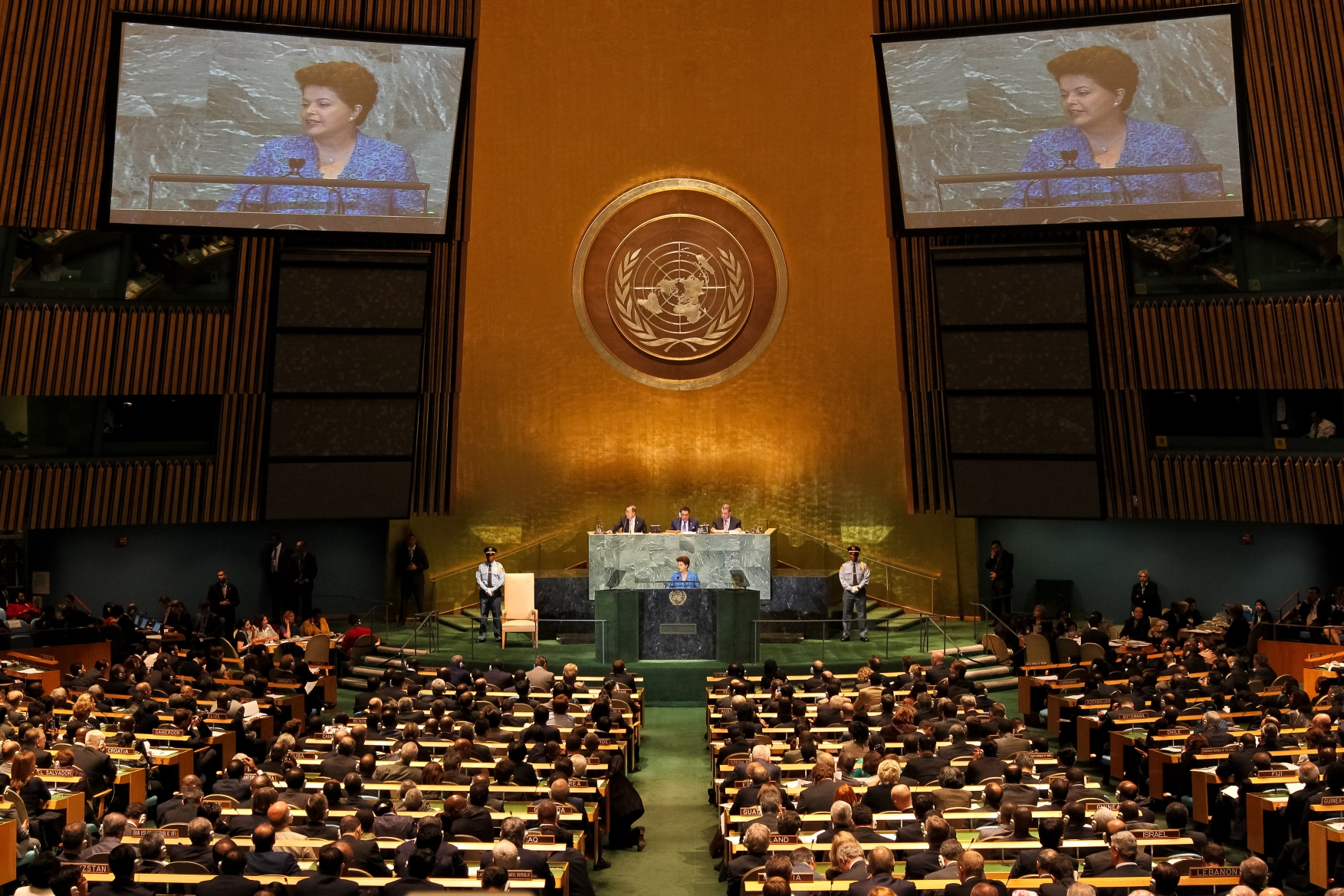
President Dilma Rousseff delivers the opening speech at the 66th session of United Nations General Assembly on 21 September 2011, marking the first time a woman opened a United Nations session.

=== General Assembly ===
Brazil has traditionally played a relevant role in the United Nations General Assembly. In 1947, Foreign Minister Oswaldo Aranha chaired the First Special Session of the General Assembly and the Second Session of the General Assembly. Since 21 September 1949, Brazil has been the first country to speak at the General Debate. Brazilian representatives deliver opening speeches that often present an assessment of the international situation as a backdrop to express the Brazilian point of view on the main issues. On September 21, 2011, President Rousseff became the first woman to open a General Debate since the United Nations was founded.

=== Security Council ===
Brazil has been elected ten times to the United Nations Security Council; the 2022–23 term was its 11th turn. It is currently ranked second (Japan is first) in terms of most number of years as an elected member.

List of terms as an elected member to the Security Council:

- 1946–47
- 1951–52
- 1954–55
- 1963–64
- 1967–68
- 1988–89
- 1993–94
- 1998–99
- 2004–05
- 2010–11
- 2022–23

==== Security Council reform ====
Brazil is actively engaged in the reform of the United Nations Security Council and has sought to garner support for a permanent seat with veto power. It formed the G4 alliance with Germany, India, and Japan for the purpose of supporting each other’s bids for permanent seats. Their proposal calls for an enlarged Security Council, expanded in both the permanent and non-permanent categories of membership. A wide coalition of member states from all regional groups of the United Nations supported the initiative.

The United States sent strong indications to Brazil that it was willing to support its membership; albeit, without a veto. In June 2011, the Council on Foreign Relations recommended that the US government fully endorse the inclusion of Brazil as a permanent member of the Security Council. Brazil has also received backing from other permanent members: Russia, the United Kingdom, France, all nations that form Community of Portuguese Language Countries (CPLP), Chile, Indonesia, Finland, Slovenia, Australia, South Africa, Guatemala, Vietnam, the Philippines, among others.

==== Peacekeeping ====
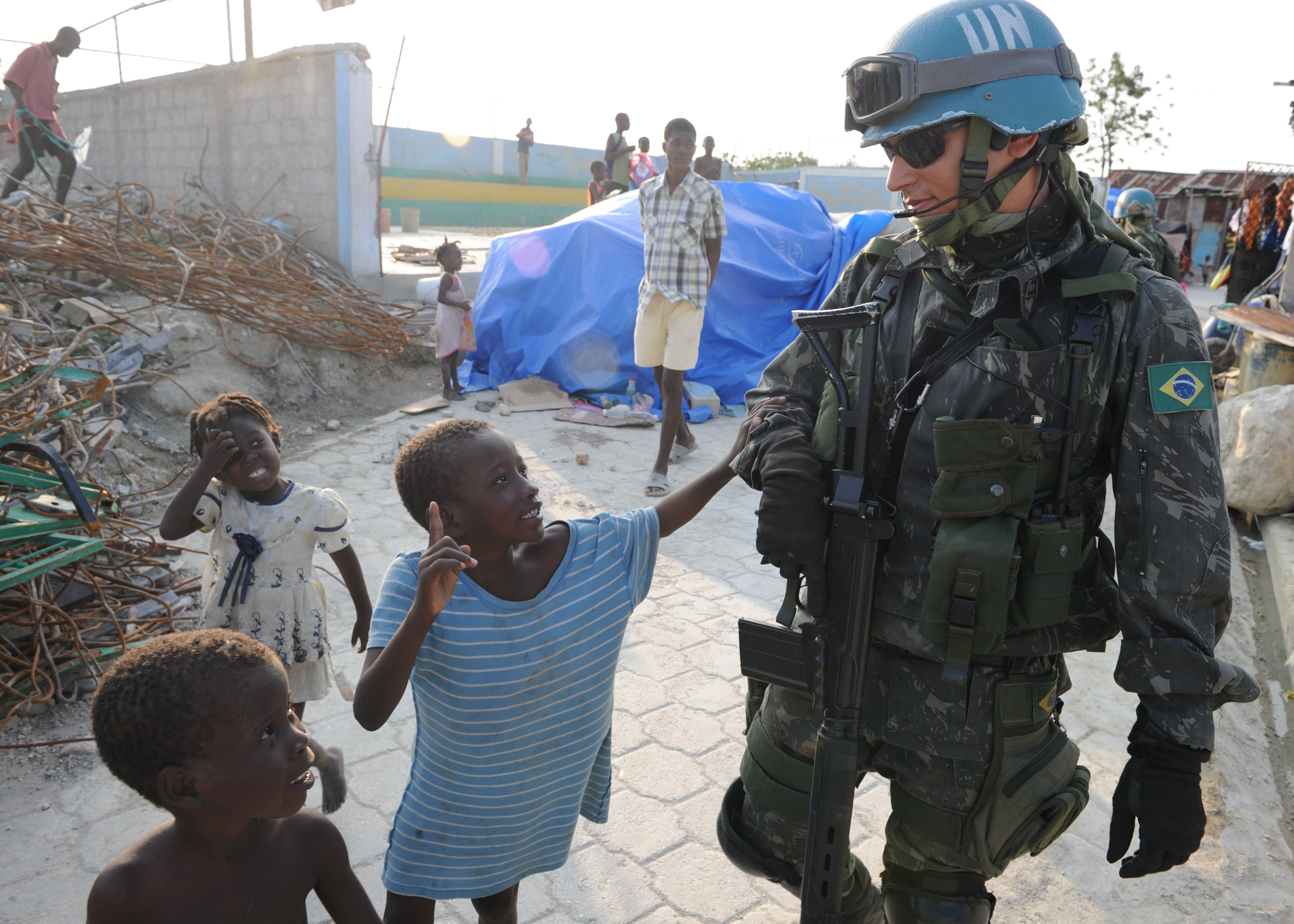
Brazilian peacekeeping soldier in Haiti.

A founding member of the United Nations, Brazil has a long tradition of contributing to peacekeeping operations. Brazil has participated in 33 United Nations peacekeeping operations and contributed with over 27,000 troops. Currently, Brazil contributes with more than 2,200 troops, military observers and police officers in three continents.

Brazil led the military component of the United Nations Stabilisation Mission in Haiti (MINUSTAH) from its establishment in 2004, until the dissolution of MINUSTAH in 2017 amid ongoing controversy. The mission's Force Commander was Major General Fernando Rodrigues Goulart of the Brazilian Army. Brazil was the biggest troop-contributing country to MINUSTAH, with 2,200 active military personnel.

Brazil also leads the Maritime Task Force (MTF) of the United Nations Interim Force in Lebanon (UNIFIL). Since February 2011, the UNIFIL MTF is under the command of Rear Admiral Luiz Henrique Caroli of the Brazilian Navy. The Brazilian Niteroi-class frigate, União, is the flagship of the fleet comprising vessels from three other countries.

=== Financial contribution ===
Brazil is one of the largest contributors to the United Nations regular budget, with a net contribution of USD 57 million for the 2022 Assessment.

== Representation ==
=== New York ===
Brazil maintains a permanent mission to the United Nations in New York, which is headed by Ambassador Sérgio França Danese The mission is responsible for Brazil's participation in all United Nations events that concern the country in meetings of the General Assembly, Security Council, and other U.N. agencies headquartered in New York.

=== Geneva ===
Brazil maintains a permanent mission to the United Nations Office at Geneva, headed by Ambassador Maria Nazareth Farani Azevêdo. The delegation is responsible for representing Brazil at the agencies headquartered in Geneva.

=== Rome ===
In Rome, Brazil maintains a delegation to the Food and Agriculture Organization (FAO), led by Ambassador Antonino Marques Porto e Santos.

=== Paris ===
At the United Nations Educational, Scientific and Cultural Organization (UNESCO) headquarters in Paris, the Permanent Delegation of Brazil is headed by Ambassador Marcia Donner Abreu. Brazil joined UNESCO in 1946, and has been a member of its executive board several times, most recently 2007–09.

== Events hosted ==
Brazil served in the past as a host for UN's conferences, such as the Conference on Environment and Development, also known as Earth Summit that happened in Rio de Janeiro in 1992. Brazil turned down offer to host 2019's UN Climate Change Conference.

== See also ==
- Foreign relations of Brazil
