= List of countries by number of United Nations peacekeepers contributed =

This is a list of countries by total number of peacekeepers contributed to United Nations operations based on United Nations reporting as of 31 October 2025.

== List ==
Rank	Country	Peacekeepers			
Rank	Country	Total	Male	Female	Per million population (Note: Per capita values calculated based on List of countries and dependencies by population as of 25 April 2026.)
1	Nepal	6029	5443	586	201.56
2	Rwanda	5880	5186	694	416.87
3	Bangladesh	5568	5202	366	32.79
4	India	5165	4996	169	3.64
5	Pakistan	2662	2515	147	11.02
6	Ghana	2636	2219	417	78.12
7	Indonesia	2461	2256	205	8.54
8	China	1875	1809	66	1.33
9	Tanzania	1531	1348	183	22.46
10	Ethiopia	1527	1363	164	13.68
11	Morocco	1501	1425	76	40.76
12	Egypt	1190	1090	100	11.03
13	Cameroon	1116	968	148	37.90
14	Senegal	1115	930	185	58.45
15	Italy	946	882	64	16.05
16	Tunisia	917	855	62	76.59
17	Zambia	904	695	209	45.90
18	Mongolia	896	768	128	252.76
19	Malaysia	858	760	98	24.99
20	Uruguay	855	804	51	245.27
21	Mauritania	790	771	19	160.32
22	Malawi	778	673	105	37.52
23	Burundi	769	711	58	62.35
24	South Africa	765	590	175	12.12
25	Spain	677	641	36	13.66
26	France	663	620	43	9.60
27	Uganda	658	571	87	14.33
28	Cambodia	612	480	132	34.82
29	South Korea	542	512	30	10.60
30	Kenya	474	397	77	8.89
31	Ireland	355	330	25	65.03
32	Fiji	337	288	49	373.36
33	Sri Lanka	331	305	26	15.20
34	Thailand	314	260	54	4.77
35	Vietnam	281	239	42	2.75
36	Peru	270	223	47	7.86
37	Serbia	267	226	41	40.65
38	Argentina	246	206	40	5.30
38	United Kingdom	246	214	32	3.54
40	Nigeria	240	181	59	1.07
41	Jordan	237	217	20	19.85
42	Portugal	230	211	19	21.40
43	Slovakia	223	198	25	41.22
44	Ivory Coast	221	192	29	6.97
45	Djibouti	217	184	33	203.41
46	Poland	202	174	28	5.42
47	Guatemala	200	183	17	10.92
48	Turkey	198	193	5	2.30
49	Germany	193	166	27	2.31
50	Finland	186	172	14	32.91
51	Republic of the Congo	182	153	29	29.63
52	Bhutan	172	155	17	219.38
53	Austria	166	159	7	18.01
54	Kazakhstan	161	157	4	7.84
55	Greece	122	102	20	11.76
56	Burkina Faso	80	59	21	3.32
57	Brazil	74	61	13	0.35
58	Togo	64	41	23	7.91
59=	El Salvador	62	55	7	10.28
59=	Niger	62	44	18	2.25
61	Russia	59	39	20	0.40
62=	The Gambia	36	25	11	14.86
62=	Norway	36	29	7	6.40
64	Paraguay	35	28	7	5.73
65	Romania	34	29	5	1.79
66=	Armenia	33	31	2	10.73
66=	Hungary	33	31	2	3.48
68	Zimbabwe	31	16	15	1.82
69=	Australia	30	22	8	1.08
69=	Brunei	30	28	2	65.42
71=	Philippines	29	13	16	0.25
71=	Sierra Leone	29	17	12	3.19
73=	Canada	27	22	5	0.65
73=	Chad	27	23	4	1.40
75	Benin	26	19	7	1.97
76=	Guinea	23	17	6	1.31
76=	Switzerland	23	21	2	2.52
78	Mali	22	17	5	0.98
79	Liberia	21	13	8	4.00
80	Mexico	19	10	9	0.15
81	United States	18	17	1	0.05
82=	Bolivia	17	13	4	1.50
82=	Sweden	17	13	4	1.60
84=	Bosnia and Herzegovina	15	10	5	4.40
84=	Chile	15	10	5	0.74
84=	Honduras	15	13	2	1.47
87=	Denmark	11	8	3	1.82
87=	Kyrgyzstan	11	9	2	1.49
87=	Netherlands	11	5	6	0.61
87=	New Zealand	11	10	1	2.06
87=	Slovenia	11	11	0	5.15
92=	Croatia	10	8	2	2.59
92=	Ecuador	10	9	1	0.55
94	Czech Republic	9	7	2	0.82
95=	Malta	8	6	2	13.93
95=	Namibia	8	3	5	2.65
95=	Moldova	8	5	3	3.36
95=	Samoa	8	6	2	38.92
99	Vanuatu	6	4	2	18.67
100=	Colombia	5	5	0	0.09
100=	Latvia	5	4	1	2.75
102=	Dominican Republic	4	2	2	0.37
102=	Japan	4	4	0	0.03
102=	North Macedonia	4	4	0	2.19
105=	Albania	3	0	3	1.27
105=	Botswana	3	2	1	1.27
105=	Madagascar	3	1	2	0.09
105=	Montenegro	3	2	1	4.81
109=	Algeria	2	2	0	0.04
109=	Angola	2	1	1	0.05
109=	Azerbaijan	2	2	0	0.19
109=	Cuba	2	2	0	0.21
109=	Cyprus	2	2	0	2.03
109=	Estonia	2	2	0	1.47
109=	Tajikistan	2	2	0	0.19
109=	Timor-Leste	2	2	0	1.44
117	Belgium	1	1	0	0.08
118	Ukraine	0 (Note: Many UN Member States are not providing personnel for peacekeeping operations, but Ukraine is the only one listed as zero in official UN documentation.)	0	0	0.00

== See also ==
- List of countries by number of military and paramilitary personnel
