= Group of Asia and the Pacific Small Island Developing States =

United Nations regional group

- Formation: 1964; 62 years ago
- Type: Regional group
- Legal status: Active

The Asia and the Pacific Group Member States.

The Group of Asia and the Pacific Small Island Developing States (often shortened as Asia and the Pacific or Asia–Pacific Group) is one of the five United Nations regional groups and is composed of 54 Member States from Asia and Oceania. (Note: Excluding Turkey)

The Group, as with all the regional groups, is a non-binding dialogue group where subjects concerning regional and international matters are discussed. Additionally, the Group works to help allocate seats on United Nations bodies by nominating candidates from the region.

== Member States ==
The following are the Member States of the Asia and the Pacific Group:

- Afghanistan
- Bahrain
- Bangladesh
- Bhutan
- Brunei
- Cambodia
- China (Note: Permanent member of the United Nations Security Council)
- Cyprus
- Fiji
- India
- Indonesia
- Iran
- Iraq
- Japan
- Jordan
- Kazakhstan
- Kiribati
- Kuwait
- Kyrgyzstan
- Laos
- Lebanon
- Malaysia
- Maldives
- Marshall Islands
- Federated States of Micronesia
- Mongolia
- Myanmar (Note: Formerly known as Burma until 1989.)
- Nauru
- Nepal
- North Korea
- Oman
- Pakistan
- Palau
- State of Palestine (Note: While the State of Palestine is only a non-member observer state in the General Assembly, it has participated fully in the Asia Group since 2 April 1986 as the Palestine Liberation Organization.)
- Papua New Guinea
- Philippines
- Qatar
- Samoa
- Saudi Arabia
- Singapore
- Solomon Islands
- South Korea
- Sri Lanka
- Syria
- Tajikistan
- Thailand
- Timor-Leste
- Tonga
- Turkey (Note: Turkey participates the Western European And Others Group, as well as the Asian Group, but for electoral purposes it is considered a member of Western European And Others Group.)
- Turkmenistan
- Tuvalu
- United Arab Emirates
- Uzbekistan
- Vanuatu
- Viet Nam
- Yemen

== History ==
Initially, the Group was known as the Asian Group. However, by the 1970s, Pacific island nations were gaining independence and joining the group. By the mid-2000s the number of Pacific island nations in the group had reached over one fifth of the membership, so they began to advocate for a change of name of the Group.

These efforts were met with success in 2011 when the United Nations agreed to include "Pacific" in the name of the Group, changing it to the Group of Asia and the Pacific Small Island Developing States at China's insistence. This change in name recognizes the growing role Pacific island nations play in the United Nations System.

== Representation ==
=== Security Council ===
The Asia and the Pacific Group holds 3 seats on the Security Council, 2 non-permanent and 1 permanent. The current members of the Security Council from the Group are:

Country	Term
China	Permanent
Bahrain	1 January 2026 – 31 December 2027
Pakistan	1 January 2025 – 31 December 2026

=== Economic and Social Council ===
The Asia and the Pacific Group holds 11 seats on the United Nations Economic and Social Council. The current members of the Economic and Social Council from the Group are:

Country	Term
Indonesia	1 January 2021 – 31 December 2023
Japan	1 January 2021 – 31 December 2023
Solomon Islands	1 January 2021 – 31 December 2023
Afghanistan	1 January 2022 – 31 December 2024
India	1 January 2022 – 31 December 2024
Oman	1 January 2022 – 31 December 2024
Kazakhstan	1 January 2022 – 31 December 2024
Bangladesh	1 January 2020 – 31 December 2022
China	1 January 2020 – 31 December 2022
Republic of Korea	1 January 2020 – 31 December 2022
Thailand	1 January 2020 – 31 December 2022

=== Human Rights Council ===
The Asia–Pacific Group holds 13 seats on the United Nations Human Rights Council. The current members of the Economic and Social Council from the Group are:

Country	Term
China	1 January 2021 – 31 December 2023
Nepal	1 January 2021 – 31 December 2023
Pakistan	1 January 2021 – 31 December 2023
Uzbekistan	1 January 2021 – 31 December 2023
Bahrain	1 January 2019 – 31 December 2021
Bangladesh	1 January 2019 – 31 December 2021
Fiji	1 January 2019 – 31 December 2021
India	1 January 2019 – 31 December 2021
Philippines	1 January 2019 – 31 December 2021
Indonesia	1 January 2020 – 31 December 2022
Republic of Korea	1 January 2020 – 31 December 2022
Japan	1 January 2020 – 31 December 2022
Marshall Islands	1 January 2020 – 31 December 2022

=== Presidency of the General Assembly ===
Every five years in the years ending in 1 and 6, the Asia–Pacific Group is eligible to elect a president to the General Assembly.

The following is a list of presidents from the region since its official creation in 1963:

Year Elected	Session	Name of President	Country	Note
1966	21st	Abdul Rahman Pazhwak	Afghanistan	Also chaired the 5th and 6th emergency special sessions of the General Assembly
1971	26th	Adam Malik	Indonesia	
1976	31st	H. S. Amerasinghe	Sri Lanka	
1981	36th	Ismat T. Kittani	Iraq	Also chaired the 7th and 9th emergency special sessions and the 12th special session of the General Assembly
1986	41st	Humayun Rasheed Choudhury	Bangladesh	Also chaired the 14th special session of the General Assembly
1991	46th	Samir S. Shihabi	Saudi Arabia	
1996	51st	Razali Ismail	Malaysia	Also chaired the 10th emergency special and 19th special sessions of the General Assembly
2001	56th	Han Seung-soo	Republic of Korea	Also chaired the 10th emergency special session of the General Assembly
2006	61st	Sheikha Haya Rashed Al Khalifa	Bahrain	Also chaired the 10th emergency special session of the General Assembly
2011	66th	Nassir Abdulaziz Al-Nasser	Qatar	
2016	71st	Peter Thomson	Fiji	
2021	76th	Abdulla Shahid	Maldives	
2026	81st	Khalilur Rahman	Bangladesh	
Future
2031	86th	TBD	TBD	
2036	91st	TBD	TBD	

== Timeline of membership ==
As the Group of Asia and The Pacific Small Island Developing States changed significantly over time, the number of its members had also changed.

Years	Number of members	Notes
1966-1967	25	Afghanistan, Burma (now Myanmar), Cambodia, Ceylon (now Sri Lanka), Cyprus, India, Indonesia, Iran, Iraq, Japan, Jordan, Kuwait, Laos, Lebanon, Malaysia, Maldives, Mongolia, Nepal, Pakistan, Philippines, Saudi Arabia, Singapore, Syria, Thailand, Yemen
1967-1970	26	South Yemen
1970-1971	27	Fiji
1971	28	China (Note: The Republic of China never joined the Asian Group.)
1971-1974	33	Bahrain, Bhutan, Oman, Qatar, United Arab Emirates
1974-1975	34	Bangladesh
1975-1976	35	Papua New Guinea
1976-1977	36	Samoa
1977-1978	37	Vietnam
1978-1981	38	Solomon Islands
1981-1984	39	Vanuatu
1984-1990	40	Brunei
1990-1991	39	Yemeni unification
1991-1992	43	Marshall Islands, Micronesia (Federated States of), Democratic People's Republic of Korea, Republic of Korea
1992-1994	48	Kazakhstan, Kyrgyzstan, Tajikistan, Turkmenistan, Uzbekistan
1994-1999	49	Palau
1999-2000	51	Nauru, Tonga
2000-2024	52	Tuvalu
2024-present	53	Kiribati

== See also ==
- United Nations Regional Groups
- Small Island Developing States
- List of members of the United Nations Security Council
- List of members of the United Nations Economic and Social Council
