= Latin American and Caribbean Group =

United Nations regional group

- Abbreviation: GRULAC
- Formation: 1945; 81 years ago
- Type: Regional Group
- Legal status: Active

The Latin American and Caribbean Group Member States.

The Group of Latin America and Caribbean Countries, or GRULAC, is one of the five United Nations Regional Groups composed of 33 Member States from Central and South America, as well as island nations in the Caribbean. Its members compose 17% of all United Nations members. The bloc overlaps with the Community of Latin American and Caribbean States based in Uruguay.

The Group, as with all the regional groups, is a non-binding dialogue group where subjects concerning regional and international matters are discussed. Additionally, the Group works to help allocates seats on United Nations bodies by nominating candidates from the region.

In 1985, the group was known as the Latin American Group. Starting in 1986, the name Latin American and Caribbean Group is used in statements by the group chair.

== Member States ==
The following are the Member States of the Latin American and Caribbean Group:

- Antigua and Barbuda
- Argentina
- Bahamas
- Barbados
- Belize
- Bolivia
- Brazil
- Chile
- Colombia
- Costa Rica
- Cuba
- Dominica
- Dominican Republic
- Ecuador
- El Salvador
- Grenada
- Guatemala
- Guyana
- Haiti
- Honduras
- Jamaica
- Mexico
- Nicaragua
- Panama
- Paraguay
- Peru
- Saint Lucia
- Saint Kitts and Nevis
- Saint Vincent and the Grenadines
- Suriname
- Trinidad and Tobago
- Uruguay
- Venezuela

== Representation ==
=== Security Council ===
The Latin American and Caribbean Group currently holds two seats on the Security Council, both non-permanent. The current members of the Security Council from the Group are:

Country	Term
Guyana	1 January 2024 – 31 December 2025
Panama	1 January 2025 – 31 December 2026

=== Economic and Social Council ===
The Latin American and Caribbean Group currently holds 10 seats on the United Nations Economic and Social Council. The current members of the Economic and Social Council from the Group are:

Country	Term
Argentina	1 January 2021 – 31 December 2023
Bolivia	1 January 2021 – 31 December 2023
Guatemala	1 January 2021 – 31 December 2023
Mexico	1 January 2021 – 31 December 2023
Brazil	1 January 2019 – 31 December 2021
Jamaica	1 January 2019 – 31 December 2021
Paraguay	1 January 2019 – 31 December 2021
Nicaragua	1 January 2020 – 31 December 2022
Colombia	1 January 2020 – 31 December 2022
Panama	1 January 2020 – 31 December 2022

=== Human Rights Council ===
The Latin American and Caribbean Group currently holds eight seats on the United Nations Human Rights Council. The current members of the Economic and Social Council from the Group are:

Country	Term
Bolivia	1 January 2021 – 31 December 2023
Cuba	1 January 2021 – 31 December 2023
Mexico	1 January 2021 – 31 December 2023
Argentina	1 January 2019 – 31 December 2021
Bahamas	1 January 2019 – 31 December 2021
Uruguay	1 January 2019 – 31 December 2021
Brazil	1 January 2020 – 31 December 2022
Venezuela	1 January 2020 – 31 December 2022

=== Presidency of the General Assembly ===
Every five years in the years ending in 3 and 8, the Latin American and Caribbean Group is eligible to elect a president to the General Assembly.

The following is a list of presidents from the Group since its official creation in 1963:

Year Elected	Session	Name of President	Country	Note
1963	18th	Carlos Sosa Rodríguez	Venezuela	
1968	23rd	Emilio Arenales Catalán	Guatemala	
1973	28th	Leopoldo Benítes	Ecuador	Also chaired the sixth special session of the General Assembly
1978	33rd	Indalecio Liévano	Colombia	
1983	38th	Jorge E. Illueca	Panama	
1988	43rd	Dante M. Caputo	Argentina	
1993	48th	Samuel R. Insanally	Guyana	
1998	53rd	Didier Opertti	Uruguay	Also chaired the 10th emergency special session of the General Assembly
2003	58th	Julian Robert Hunte	Saint Lucia	
2008	63rd	Miguel d’Escoto Brockmann	Nicaragua	
2013	68th	John W. Ashe	Antigua and Barbuda	
2018	73rd	María Fernanda Espinosa	Ecuador	
2023	78th	Dennis Francis	Trinidad and Tobago	
Future
2028	83rd	TBD	TBD	
2033	88th	TBD	TBD	

== Timeline of membership ==
Years	Number of members	Notes
1946-1962	20	Argentina, Bolivia, Brazil, Chile, Colombia, Costa Rica, Cuba, Dominican Republic, Ecuador, El Salvador, Guatemala, Haiti, Honduras, Mexico, Nicaragua, Panama, Paraguay, Peru, Uruguay, Venezuela
1962-1966	22	Jamaica, Trinidad and Tobago
1966-1973	24	Guyana, Barbados
1973-1974	25	Bahamas
1974-1975	26	Grenada
1975-1978	27	Suriname
1978-1979	28	Dominica
1979-1980	29	Saint Lucia
1980-1981	30	Saint Vincent and the Grenadines
1981-1983	32	Antigua and Barbuda, Belize
1983–Present	33	Saint Kitts and Nevis

The Latin American Group has existed since the founding of the United Nations in 1945, before the UN first met in 1946. It was initially the largest regional group, containing over 43% (20 out of 46) of the electable members.

In 1962, the group had its first non-Latin American member (Jamaica).

== Role ==
The Group plays a major role in promoting the region's interests. It provides a forum for Member States to exchange opinions on international issues, carry out follow-up on the topics that are being discussed in international organisations, build common positions on complex issues and prepare statements reflecting the joint position of the Group.

However, most importantly, the Group allows for the discussion and coordination of support for candidates for different United nations organisations from the region.

Regular meetings of the Group take place in Geneva. The most common topics discussed at these meetings are human rights, environment, intellectual property, labour rights, trade and development and telecommunications.

== Locations ==
The Group maintains various offices across the globe:

- Rome
  - The two offices in Rome focus on bilateral and multilateral issues, particular those of the United Nations agencies based in Rome.
- Vienna
  - The office in Vienna focuses candidate memberships to the Group. It also deals with issues relating to: the United Nations Office at Vienna, the International Atomic Energy Agency, the Preparatory Commission for the Comprehensive Nuclear-Test-Ban Treaty Organization, the United Nations Office for Outer Space Affairs and the United Nations Industrial Development Organization. The office also acts as the Group's liaison to the Group of 77 and China and the Non-Aligned Movement
- New York
  - The office in New York deals primarily with candidacy issues and other general topics.

== See also ==
- United Nations Regional Groups
- List of members of the United Nations Security Council
- List of members of the United Nations Economic and Social Council
