= African Group =

United Nations regional group

Group of African States
- Formation: 1964; 62 years ago
- Type: Regional group
- Legal status: Active

The Group of African States, or African Group, is one of the five United Nations regional groups and is composed of 54 Member States from the African continent. The African Group is the largest regional group, and compose 28% of all United Nations members.

The Group, as with all the regional groups, is a non-binding dialogue group where subjects concerning regional and international matters are discussed. Additionally, the Group works to help allocates seats on United Nations bodies by nominating candidates from the region.

== Role ==
The Group, as with all the regional groups, plays a major role in promoting the region's interests. It provides a forum for Member States to exchange opinions on international issues, carry out follow-up on the topics that are being discussed in international organisations, build common positions on complex issues and prepare statements reflecting the joint position of the Group.

However, most importantly, the Group allows for the discussion and coordination of support for candidates for different United Nations organisations from the region.

== Member States ==
The following are the Member States of the African Group:

- Algeria
- Angola
- Benin
- Botswana
- Burkina Faso
- Burundi
- Cape Verde
- Cameroon
- Central African Republic
- Chad
- Comoros
- Congo
- Côte d'Ivoire
- DR Congo
- Djibouti
- Egypt
- Equatorial Guinea
- Eritrea
- Eswatini
- Ethiopia
- Gabon
- Gambia
- Ghana
- Guinea
- Guinea-Bissau
- Kenya
- Lesotho
- Liberia
- Libya
- Madagascar
- Malawi
- Mali
- Mauritania
- Mauritius
- Morocco
- Mozambique
- Namibia
- Niger
- Nigeria
- Rwanda
- São Tomé and Príncipe
- Senegal
- Seychelles
- Sierra Leone
- Somalia
- South Africa
- South Sudan
- Sudan
- Tanzania
- Togo
- Tunisia
- Uganda
- Zambia
- Zimbabwe

== Representation ==
=== Security Council ===
The African Group currently holds three seats on the Security Council, all non-permanent. The current members of the Security Council from the Group are:

Country	Term
Somalia	1 January 2025 — 31 December 2026
Algeria	1 January 2024 — 31 December 2025
Sierra Leone	1 January 2024 — 31 December 2025

=== Economic and Social Council ===
The African Group currently holds 14 seats on the United Nations Economic and Social Council. The current members of the Economic and Social Council from the Group are:

Country	Term
Algeria Ivory Coast Djibouti South Africa Tanzania	1 January 2025 — 31 December 2027
Kenya	1 January 2024 – 31 December 2026
Mauritania	1 January 2024 – 31 December 2026
Niger	1 January 2024 – 31 December 2026
Senegal	1 January 2024 – 31 December 2026
Zambia	1 January 2024 – 31 December 2026
Botswana	1 January 2023 — 31 December 2025
Cabo Verde	1 January 2023 — 31 December 2025
Cameroon	1 January 2023 — 31 December 2025
Equatorial Guinea	1 January 2023 — 31 December 2025

=== Human Rights Council ===
The African Group currently holds 13 seats on the United Nations Human Rights Council. The current members of the Human Rights Council from the Group are:

Country	Term
Benin DR Congo Ethiopia Gambia Kenya	1 January 2025 — 31 December 2027
Burundi	1 January 2024 — 31 December 2026
Cote d'Ivoire	1 January 2024 — 31 December 2026
Ghana	1 January 2024 — 31 December 2026
Malawi	1 January 2024 — 31 December 2026
Algeria	1 January 2023 — 31 December 2025
Morocco	1 January 2023 — 31 December 2025
South Africa	1 January 2023 — 31 December 2025
Sudan	1 January 2023 — 31 December 2025

=== Presidency of the General Assembly ===
Every five years, in the years ending in 4 and 9, the African Group is eligible to elect a president to the General Assembly.

The following is a list of presidents from the Group since its official creation in 1963:

Year Elected	Session	Name of President	Country	Note
1964	19th	Alex Quaison-Sackey	Ghana	
1969	24th	Angie E. Brooks	Liberia	
1974	29th	Abdelaziz Bouteflika	Algeria	
1979	34th	Salim A. Salim	Tanzania	Also chaired the 6th and 7th emergency special, and 11th special sessions of the General Assembly
1984	39th	Paul J. F. Lusaka	Zambia	
1989	44th	Joseph Nanven Garba	Nigeria	Also chaired 16th, 17th and 18th special sessions of the General Assembly
1994	49th	Amara Essy	Côte d'Ivoire	
1999	54th	Theo-Ben Gurirab	Namibia	Also chaired the 22nd, 23rd and 24th special sessions of the General Assembly
2004	59th	Jean Ping	Gabon	
2009	64th	Ali Abdussalam Treki	Libya	Also chaired the 29th special session of the General Assembly
2014	69th	Sam Kahamba Kutesa	Uganda	
2019	74th	Tijjani Muhammad-Bande	Nigeria	
2024	79th	Philémon Yang	Cameroon	
Future
2029	84th	TBA	TBA	
2034	89th	TBA	TBA	
