= Argentina and the United Nations =

Argentina

United Nations membership
- Membership: Full member
- Since: 24 October 1945
- UNSC seat: Non-permanent
- Permanent representative: Francisco Fabián Tropepi

Argentina is one of the 51 founding members of the United Nations having signed the United Nations Conference on International Organization in 1945.

Argentina has been a non-permanent member of the UN Security Council for nine terms (a total of 18 years), with the most recent being the 2013–14 term.

Argentina is a charter member of the United Nations and participates in all of its specialised agencies. Argentina has contributed 306 troops to United Nations peacekeeping efforts as of 2024.

== Classification ==
African Group Asia and the Pacific Group Eastern European Group Latin American and Caribbean Group Western European and Others Group

Argentina participates in the Latin American and Caribbean Group regional grouping. It is also part of the South America geographical subregion and Americas continental region.

== Activities ==
=== Funding ===
The regular budget of the United Nations is financed through compulsory contributions from its member states. From 2022 to 2024, Argentina contributed 0.719% of the UN regular budget. This placed Argentina as the 23rd nation by contribution amount.

=== Security Council ===
Argentina has held a non-permanent seat in the United Nations Security Council nine times since its entry in 1945.

Security Council terms
Election	Votes (Pl.-Rd.)	Term
1947	41/57 (1st-R1)	1948–49
1958	78/79 (1st-R1)	1959–60
1965	113/115 (1st-R1)	1966–67
1970	109/113 (1st-R1)	1971–72
1986	143/154 (2nd-R1)	1987–88
1993	169/176 (2nd-R1)	1994–95
1998	171/176 (2nd-R1)	1999–00
2004	188/188 (1st-GR1)	2005–06
2012	182/184 (1st-GR1)	2013–14

=== Peacekeeping ===
As of September 2025, Argentina participates in eight peacekeeping missions led by the UN.

Peacekeeping missions
Region	Mission	Personnel
Western Sahara	United Nations Mission for the Referendum in Western Sahara (MINURSO)	3
Central African Republic	United Nations Multidimensional Integrated Stabilization Mission in the Central African Republic (MINUSCA)	2
Middle East and North Africa	United Nations Disengagement Observer Force (UNDOF)	1
Cyprus	United Nations Peacekeeping Force in Cyprus (UNFICYP)	237
South Sudan	United Nations Mission in South Sudan (UNMISS)	4
India / Pakistan	United Nations Military Observer Group in India and Pakistan (UNMOGIP)	2
Middle East and North Africa	United Nations Truce Supervision Organization (UNTSO)	2
Colombia	United Nations Verification Mission in Colombia (UNVMC)	10

== Positions held ==
Argentina has had two Presidents of the United Nations General Assembly in José Arce (1948) and Dante Caputo (1988), making it one of only five nations to hold the role twice. Thirteen Argentinian representatives have served as President of the United Nations Security Council and one Argentinian representative has headed the Economic and Social Council. The nation has served on the United Nations Credentials Committee seven times.

There have been two Argentinian permanent judges of the International Court of Justice. Additionally, four Argentinian judges have served on the court on an ad hoc basis.

Argentina has never held the Secretary-General of the United Nations or Deputy Secretary-General of the United Nations positions.

United Nations positions held
Position	Person	Term
President of the United Nations General Assembly	José Arce	1948
President of the United Nations General Assembly	Dante Caputo	1988
Presidency of the United Nations Security Council	Juan Atilio Bramuglia	October 1948
Presidency of the United Nations Security Council	José Arce	November 1948, November 1949
Presidency of the United Nations Security Council	Mario Amadeo	May 1959, April 1960
Presidency of the United Nations Security Council	Raúl Alberto Quijano	January 1967
Presidency of the United Nations Security Council	Carlos Ortiz de Rozas	March 1971, July 1972
Presidency of the United Nations Security Council	Marcelo Delpech	March 1987, June 1988
Presidency of the United Nations Security Council	Emilio Cárdenas	January 1995
Presidency of the United Nations Security Council	Arnoldo Manuel Listre	February 2000
Presidency of the United Nations Security Council	Adalberto Rodríguez Giavarini	February 2000
Presidency of the United Nations Security Council	Rafael Bielsa	January 2005
Presidency of the United Nations Security Council	César Mayoral	January 2005, March 2006
Presidency of the United Nations Security Council	Agustín Rossi	August 2013
Presidency of the United Nations Security Council	María Perceval	August 2013, October 2014
President of the United Nations Economic and Social Council	Juan I. Cooke	1954
Permanent judges of the International Court of Justice	Lucio Moreno Quintana	1955-1964
Permanent judges of the International Court of Justice	José María Ruda	1973-1991
Judges sitting ad hoc on the International Court of Justice	Silvia Alejandra Fernández de Gurmendi	2023-present
Judges sitting ad hoc on the International Court of Justice	Mónica Pinto	2016-present
Judges sitting ad hoc on the International Court of Justice	José María Ruda	1991-2001
Judges sitting ad hoc on the International Court of Justice	Raúl Emilio Vinuesa	2006-2013
United Nations Credentials Committee	—	1956, 1958, 1987, 1992, 1997, 2002, 2015

== Permanent representative ==
Argentina has a mission to the UN led by a permanent representative, also known as a UN Ambassador. The position is currently held by Francisco Fabián Tropepi, who presented credentials in December 2024.

== See also ==
- Category:Argentina and the United Nations (10)
