= November 1946 United Nations Security Council election =

Election to the United Nations Security Council

- 19 November 1946

3 (of 6) non-permanent seats on the United Nations Security Council
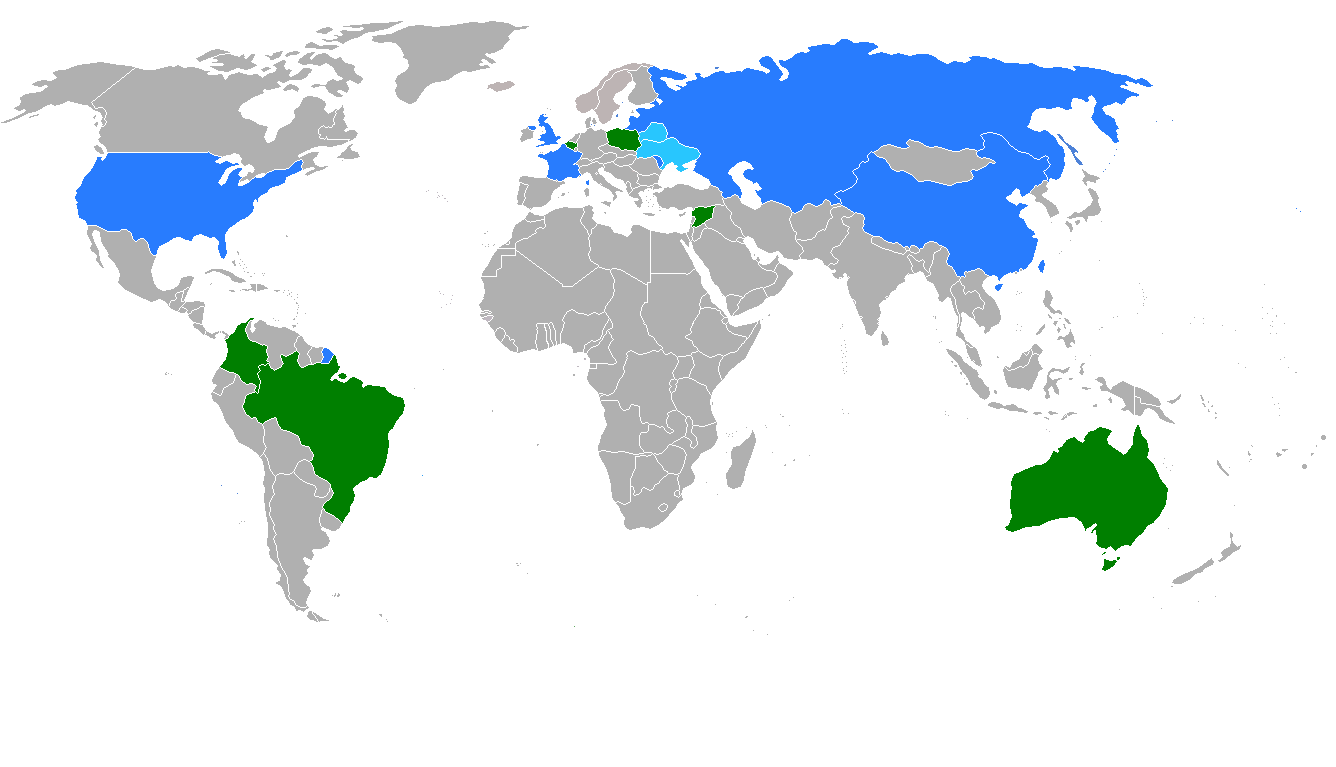
Members before election
Mexico
Egypt
Netherlands
New Members
Colombia
Syria
Belgium

The second 1946 United Nations Security Council election was held on 19 November 1946 during the First session of the United Nations General Assembly. The General Assembly elected Belgium, Colombia, and Syria, as the three new non-permanent members of the UN Security Council for two-year mandates commencing in January 1947.

== Result ==
The election was managed by the then-President of the United Nations General Assembly Paul-Henri Spaak of Belgium. On this date, the United Nations had 54 member states, Afghanistan, Iceland, and Sweden having been welcomed to the organization earlier during the same meeting (for a timeline of UN membership, see Enlargement of the United Nations). The election was done using a list of United Nations member states. From the list the eight current members of the Security Council were removed (the Permanent Five and Australia, Brazil, and Poland) and also the three members that could not stand for immediate re-election (Egypt, Mexico, and the Netherlands). Heads of delegations were asked to mark with a cross the square opposite the name of each member for whom they wished to vote. Voting was conducted on a single ballot. Ballots on which more than three states were marked were invalidated.

India put up a "hard back-stage fight" to win a Security Council seat after missing out in the January election, and secured the support of the United Kingdom and the Soviet Union. However, they only earned 13 votes. One ballot marked only one nation instead of three, but was still counted.

Elected to Council

| Member | Round 1 |
| Colombia | 51 |
| Syria | 45 |
| Belgium | 43 |
| India | 13 |
| Norway | 4 |
| Canada | 1 |
| Cuba | 1 |
| Greece | 1 |
| Turkey | 1 |
| invalid ballots | 0 |
| required majority | 36 |
| ballot papers | 54 |

== See also ==
- List of members of the United Nations Security Council
