= Colombia and the United Nations =

Colombia

United Nations membership
- Membership: Full member
- Since: 5 November 1945
- UNSC seat: Non-permanent
- Permanent representative: Leonor Zalabata

Colombia is one of the 51 founding members of the United Nations having signed the United Nations Conference on International Organization in 1945.

Colombia has been a non-permanent member of the UN Security Council for seven terms (a total of 14 years), with the most recent being the 2011–12 term.

Colombia is a charter member of the United Nations and participates in all of its specialised agencies. Colombia has contributed 10 troops to United Nations peacekeeping efforts as of 2024.

== Classification ==
African Group Asia and the Pacific Group Eastern European Group Latin American and Caribbean Group Western European and Others Group

Colombia participates in the Latin American and Caribbean Group regional grouping. It is also part of the South America geographical subregion.

== Activities ==
=== Funding ===
The regular budget of the United Nations is financed through compulsory contributions from its member states. From 2022 to 2024, Colombia contributed 0.288% of the UN regular budget. This placed Colombia as the 42nd nation by contribution amount.

=== Security Council ===
Colombia has held a non-permanent seat in the United Nations Security Council seven times since its entry in 1945.

Security Council terms
Election	Votes (Pl.-Rd.)	Term
November 1946	51/54 (1st-R1)	1947–48
1952	58/60 (1st-R1)	1953–54
1956	73/77 (1st-R1)	1957–58
1968	118/126 (3rd-R1)	1969–70
1988	154/157 (1st-R1)	1989–90
2000	168/173 (1st-R1)	2001–02
2010	186/186 (1st-GR1)	2011–12

=== Peacekeeping ===
As of September 2025, Colombia participates in three peacekeeping missions led by the UN.

Peacekeeping missions
Region	Mission	Personnel
Western Sahara	United Nations Mission for the Referendum in Western Sahara (MINURSO)	1
Central African Republic	United Nations Multidimensional Integrated Stabilization Mission in the Central African Republic (MINUSCA)	2
Lebanon	United Nations Interim Force in Lebanon (UNIFIL)	1

== Positions held ==
Colombia has had one President of the United Nations General Assembly in Indalecio Liévano, who served in 1978. Eleven Colombian representatives have served as President of the United Nations Security Council and two Colombian representatives have headed the Economic and Social Council. The nation has served on the United Nations Credentials Committee five times.

There have been no Colombian permanent judges of the International Court of Justice. However, two Colombian judges have served on the court on an ad hoc basis.

Colombia has never held the Secretary-General of the United Nations or Deputy Secretary-General of the United Nations positions.

United Nations positions held
Position	Person	Term
President of the United Nations General Assembly	Indalecio Liévano	1978
Presidency of the United Nations Security Council	Alfonso López Pumarejo	May 1947, April 1948
Presidency of the United Nations Security Council	Francisco José Urrutia Holguín	September 1953, September 1954, August-September 1957
Presidency of the United Nations Security Council	Alfonso Araújo Gaviria	July 1958
Presidency of the United Nations Security Council	Joaquín Vallejo Arbeláez	March 1970
Presidency of the United Nations Security Council	Enrique Peñalosa Camargo	December 1989
Presidency of the United Nations Security Council	Guillermo Fernández de Soto	August 2001
Presidency of the United Nations Security Council	Alfonso Valdivieso Sarmiento	August 2001, December 2002
Presidency of the United Nations Security Council	Carolina Barco	December 2002
Presidency of the United Nations Security Council	Juan Manuel Santos	April 2011
Presidency of the United Nations Security Council	Néstor Osorio Londoño	April 2011, July 2012
Presidency of the United Nations Security Council	Leonor Zalabata	June 2026
President of the United Nations Economic and Social Council	Alfonso Patiño Rosselli	1963
President of the United Nations Economic and Social Council	Néstor Osorio Londoño	2013
Judges sitting ad hoc on the International Court of Justice	José Joaquin Caicedo Castilla	1949-1951
Judges sitting ad hoc on the International Court of Justice	Francisco Urrutia Holguin	1958-1960
United Nations Credentials Committee	—	1955, 1971, 1983, 1989, 2013

== Permanent representative ==
Colombia has a mission to the UN led by a permanent representative, also known as a UN Ambassador. The position is currently held by Leonor Zalabata Torres, who presented credentials in October 2022.

== See also ==
- Category:Colombia and the United Nations (7)
