= Syria and the United Nations =

Syrian Arab Republic

United Nations membership
- Represented by: First Syrian Republic (1945–1950); Second Syrian Republic (1950–1963); United Arab Republic (1958–1961); Ba'athist Syria (1963–2024); Syrian Arab Republic (2024–present)
- Membership: Full member
- Since: 24 October 1945
- UNSC seat: Non-permanent
- Permanent Representative: Ibrahim Olabi

The Syrian Arab Republic is a member of the United Nations (UN). Syria, under the First Syrian Republic, was one of the 51 founding members of the United Nations, having signed the Charter of the United Nations in 1945.

Following independence, Syria continued its membership in the UN as a sovereign member state. In 1958, under the Second Syrian Republic, Syria entered into a political union with Egypt to form the United Arab Republic, which continued as a single UN member state. Syria restored its separate identity and resumed its individual membership in the UN on 13 October 1961.

== History ==
=== Pre-independence ===
On 17 February 1945, Syrian President Shukri al-Quwatli met British Prime Minister Winston Churchill in Cairo to request Syria's invitation to the soon-to-be-launched United Nations. At the time, Syria was under French rule and barred from the League of Nations. Syria declared war on Nazi Germany on 27 February 1945, shortly before receiving an official invitation to participate in the formation of the United Nations.

Prime Minister Fares al-Khoury led the Syrian delegation, signing the UN Charter alongside his fellow AUB alumni and joining the legal committee that approved the UN flag.

While al-Khoury was at the UN, French forces attacked Damascus on 29 May 1945, giving him the opportunity to denounce France and highlight its occupation of Syria since 1920. Churchill intervened on 1 June, summoning the French Foreign Minister to negotiate a withdrawal from Syria and Lebanon, though France wanted to keep troops in Lebanon under the Anglo-French London Agreement.

Al-Quwatli and Lebanese President Bechara El Khoury rejected the agreement, insisting that both countries were sovereign, while France blocked their proposal to address the UN. The issue reached the Security Council on 14 February 1946, where Syrian and Lebanese delegations demanded the unconditional withdrawal of French forces. Britain agreed to oversee the evacuation, which ended by mid-April 1946, allowing Syria to celebrate its first Independence Day on 17 April.

=== Post-independence ===
Following independence, Syria continued its participation in the United Nations as a sovereign member state. In 1958, Syria entered into a political union with Egypt to form the United Arab Republic, which continued as a single UN Member State. Syria restored its separate identity and UN membership on 13 October 1961. The United Arab Republic later adopted the name Arab Republic of Egypt on 2 September 1971.

=== Ba'athist Syria ===
President Nureddin al-Atassi of Syria at the United Nations Headquarters in New York

Syrian President Nureddin al-Atassi was the first Syrian president to address the United Nations General Assembly after the June 1967 War. UN officials continued to visit Syria during the later decades of Ba'athist rule. In January 2009, UN Secretary-General Ban Ki-moon visited Damascus, where he met Syrian President Bashar al-Assad amid efforts to address the Gaza conflict and wider regional issues.

Delegations from the Palestine Liberation Organization and Syria

During the Syrian civil war, senior UN officials and representatives of UN agencies made repeated visits to Syria. UN Special Envoys for Syria, including Kofi Annan, Lakhdar Brahimi, Staffan de Mistura and Geir Otto Pedersen, regularly travelled to Damascus as part of the UN-led political process, while humanitarian officials and agencies maintained operations throughout the country.

=== Post-Assad Syria ===
Following the fall of the Assad regime on 8 December 2024, UN engagement with Syria intensified. In December 2024, UN Special Envoy for Syria Geir Otto Pedersen and UN Under-Secretary-General for Humanitarian Affairs Tom Fletcher visited Damascus and met representatives of the new Syrian authorities. Pedersen stressed the need for a credible, inclusive, Syrian-owned and Syrian-led political transition, while Fletcher discussed expanding humanitarian assistance. :

During the Israeli invasion of Syria, Secretary-General António Guterres's spokesman, Stéphane Dujarric, said that Israel's expansion of its occupation was a violation of the 1974 agreement.

In January 2025, Filippo Grandi, the United Nations High Commissioner for Refugees (UNHCR), visited Syria to assess conditions for refugee and internally displaced-person returns and the country's recovery needs. In February and July 2025, Karla Quintana, head of the Independent Institution on Missing Persons in Syria, also visited Damascus to discuss cooperation on missing persons and the rights of their families.

Syria also strengthened its diplomatic engagement with the UN in 2025. Foreign Minister Asaad al-Shaibani participated in a Security Council session in New York on 25 April, while Syria's new flag was raised at United Nations Headquarters. President Ahmed al-Sharaa subsequently addressed the United Nations General Assembly in September 2025, becoming the first Syrian president to address the Assembly in almost six decades.

On 6 November 2025, the United Nations Security Council adopted Resolution 2799, removing Syrian President Ahmed al-Sharaa and Interior Minister Anas Khattab from the ISIL (Da'esh) and Al-Qaida Sanctions List. China abstained from the vote.

On 4 December 2025, al-Sharaa met with the UN Security Council delegation and several UN officials at the People's Palace in Damascus, joined by a number of Syrian ministers. It marked the delegation's first-ever visit to Syria since the council was established in 1945. On 21 July 2026, UN Deputy Special Envoy for Syria Claudio Cordone briefed the Security Council from Damascus, reporting constructive progress in talks with the Syrian government on the political transition.

On 25 July 2026, UN Secretary-General António Guterres arrived in Damascus for his first visit to Syria as Secretary-General. Guterres was scheduled to meet President Ahmed al-Sharaa, Foreign Minister Asaad Hassan al-Shaibani and other Syrian officials, as well as representatives of civil society and women's organizations. His visit also included a visit to the United Nations Disengagement Observer Force (UNDOF) in the occupied Syrian Golan. The UN described the visit as an opportunity to reaffirm its support for Syria's sovereignty, unity and territorial integrity and to assess the challenges of the country's political transition and recovery. Guterres met with Abdul Hamid al-Awak, Speaker of the People's Assembly of Syria, at Tishreen Palace. Guterres also visited Sednaya Prison, describing it as "horrific," and called for greater support for victims, survivors, and efforts to determine the fate of Syria's missing persons. A few weeks later, on 10 August, al-Sharaa met UN High Commissioner for Refugees Barham Salih in Damascus to discuss refugee returns, early recovery, and cooperation with the UNHCR.

== Permanent Representative ==
The Permanent Representative of Syria to the United Nations is the chief diplomatic representative of the Syrian Arab Republic to the organization and heads its Permanent Mission in New York City. The current Permanent Representative of Syria to the United Nations is Ibrahim Olabi, who was appointed by President Ahmed al-Sharaa on 19 August 2025.
