= 1947 United Nations Security Council election =

Election to the United Nations Security Council

- 30 September–13 November 1947

3 (of 6) non-permanent seats on the United Nations Security Council
Members before election
Brazil
Australia
Poland
New Members
Argentina
Canada
Ukrainian SSR

The 1947 United Nations Security Council election was held between 30 September and 13 November 1947 during the 92nd to 109th sessions of the United Nations General Assembly. The General Assembly elected Argentina, Canada, and the Ukrainian SSR as three non-permanent members of the UN Security Council for two-year terms commencing on 1 January 1948.

This was the first Security Council election to last longer than one day, and ended up deadlocked for more than six weeks over the last seat as no candidate was able to secure a required two-thirds majority. This and other deadlocks have been described as "elections by fatigue". This was also the first Security Council election to challenge the then-informal concept of the United Nations Regional Groups.

== Rules ==
Before 1965, the Security Council had 11 seats, filled by five permanent members and six non-permanent members. Three of the non-permanent members were elected in odd years and three in even years, with each member elected for a two-year term. A sitting member may not immediately run for re-election. To be elected, a candidate must receive a two-thirds majority of those present and voting. Voting is done by secret ballot.

== Proceedings ==
At the time, the Regional Groups assigned to each seat were informal and based on "gentlemen's agreements" between the original three superpowers, which the smaller members did not necessarily agree with. According to these agreements, the incoming members ought to be from Latin America, the British Commonwealth, and Eastern Europe (replacing the outgoing Brazil, Australia, and Poland).

After the first round of votes, Argentina and Canada won the required two-thirds majority and were elected to two of the three open seats. However, the Ukrainian SSR and then-newly independent Dominion of India each won approximately half the votes, effectively deadlocking on the last seat. (Candidates do not run for a specific seat; each elector writes three candidates on the elector's ballot.)

Seven deadlocked voting rounds occurred on the first day of the election. After the fourth, sixth, and seventh rounds, various members of the General Assembly motioned to postpone the vote. The last motion succeeded and the eighth round was postponed.

On the second day, 1 October 1947, two more deadlocked rounds occurred, after which the President of the General Assembly (then Brazil) unilaterally ruled to postpone the tenth round. The next ballot would not be put back onto the agenda until 20 October.

On 20 October 1947, two more deadlocked rounds occurred, after which the President of the General Assembly postponed the twelfth round with no objections. The next ballot would not be put back onto the agenda until 13 November.

Throughout the rounds, both the Soviet Union and India argued their positions using the United Nations Charter, which requires that elected Security Council seats account for "equitable geographical distribution". The Soviet Union demanded representation to Eastern Europe, while India demanded representation to the Indian Ocean area (which India considered outgoing member Australia to represent). The Soviet Union explicitly argued that it considered one non-permanent Security Council seat to belong to the British Commonwealth (which the Soviet Union considered Australia and incoming member Canada to represent) and one seat to belong to Eastern Europe, while India explicitly disagreed with the "arrangement privately arrived at among some of the Powers" and stated that its candidacy was to "challenge this arrangement", in a reference to the aforementioned gentlemen's agreements between the then-three superpowers. India argued that a significant number of United Nations members also disagreed with the superpower agreements, since nearly half of them voted for India over the Ukrainian SSR.

On 13 November 1947, India withdrew its candidacy, stating that it did not want to be perceived as holding up the work of the General Assembly. The Ukrainian SSR was elected to the last seat on the twelfth round.

== Result table ==
Member	Round 1	Round 2	Round 3	Round 4	Round 5	Round 6	Round 7	Round 8	Round 9	Round 10	Round 11	Round 12
Argentina	41	—	—	—	—	—	—	—	—	—	—	—
Canada	41	—	—	—	—	—	—	—	—	—	—	—
Ukrainian SSR	33	29	29	30	33	34	33	31	32	29	30	35
India	29	24	25	25	23	22	23	23	24	24	25	2
Czechoslovakia	8	—	—	—	—	—	—	—	—	—	—	—
Uruguay	8	—	—	—	—	—	—	—	—	—	—	—
Chile	2	—	—	—	—	—	—	—	—	—	—	—
Ethiopia	1	—	—	—	—	—	—	—	—	—	—	—
Greece	1	—	—	—	—	—	—	—	—	—	—	—
Guatemala	1	—	—	—	—	—	—	—	—	—	—	—
Philippines	1	—	—	—	—	—	—	—	—	—	—	—
abstentions	0	0	1	1	0	0	0	2	1	2	2	15
invalid ballots	0	3	1	1	1	1	1	0	0	0	0	2
required majority	38	36	36	37	38	38	38	36	38	35	37	26
ballot papers	57	56	56	57	57	57	57	56	57	55	57	54

In an inconsistency, a UN document from 2005 listing deadlocked elections states that some rounds in 1947 were restricted (only the deadlocked candidates may be voted on) while other rounds were unrestricted. However, the meeting records from 1947 state that all rounds were restricted.

== See also ==
- List of members of the United Nations Security Council
- India and the United Nations
