= Arab normalization with Syria =

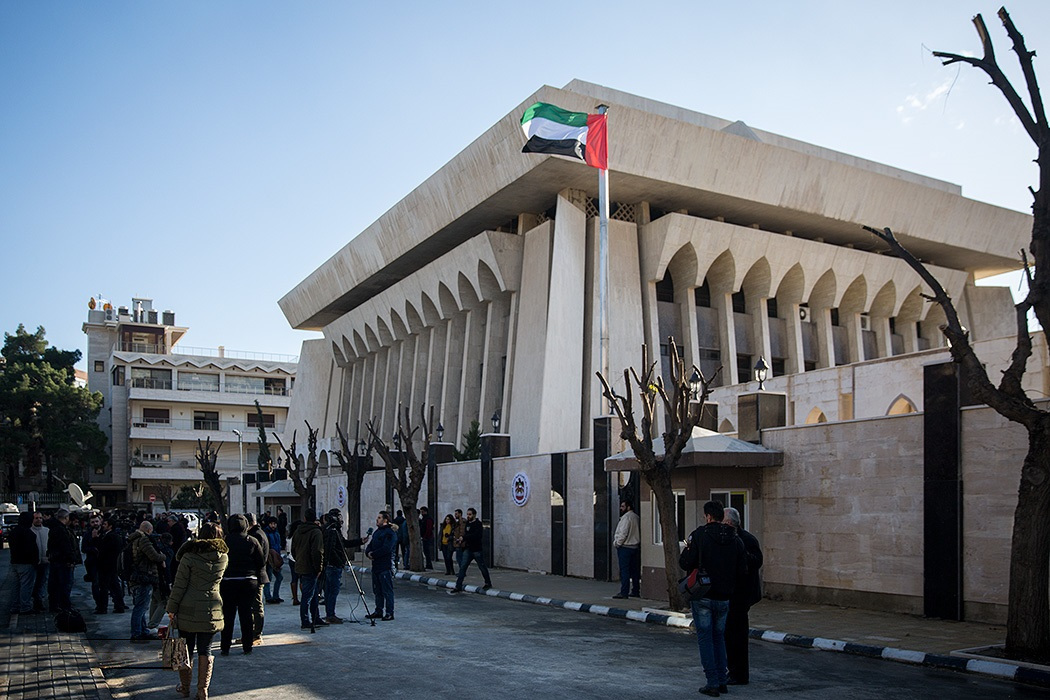
- United Arab Emirates embassy in Damascus
- Date: Late 2018 – December 2024
- Patrons: United Arab Emirates; Saudi Arabia; Jordan; Egypt; Oman
- Organized by: Mohamed bin Zayed Al Nahyan; Mohammed bin Salman; Abdullah II
- Participants: Egypt; Jordan; Iraq; Oman; Saudi Arabia; Syria; United Arab Emirates

The Arab normalization with Syria was a period of rapprochement with the Syrian Ba'athist government that had experienced severe isolation following the start of the Syrian conflict in March 2011. This isolation period saw a number of Arab countries, particularly the Gulf ones, close their embassies in Damascus, sever or downgrade relations, and support the rebels. The new approach started to become noticeable in late 2018 through visits to Syria and the softening of opposing statements among the parties. Qatar was the most opposed Gulf state to normalizing relations with Bashar al-Assad’s government. The United States under the Biden administration was advising against normalization without concessions, and if the Assad regime did not change its behavior. In May 2023, Syria returned to exercise its membership in the League of Arab States, and Bashar al-Assad attended the ordinary summit that was held in the same month. Lifting the suspension was conditional upon Syria’s commitment to the 'step-by-step' initiative.

The rapprochement was driven by an attempt to distance Damascus from its close ties with Iran, a goal that began to be partially achieved in October 2023 when the regime requested the Houthi movement's ambassador to vacate the Yemeni embassy to allow for the appointment of an ambassador representing the internationally recognized Yemeni government.

In December 2024, the Assad regime collapsed suddenly following short fighting in Aleppo and Hama, the surrender and withdrawal of the Syrian Army from other cities, and Russia providing shelter to regime officials who fled and went into exile, most notably Bashar al-Assad.

== History ==
On 27 December 2018, the UAE Ministry of Foreign Affairs announced the resumption of work at the State’s embassy in Damascus, the capital of Syria. On the next day, the Kingdom of Bahrain stated that operations at its embassy to the Syrian Arab Republic would "continue".

On 5 October 2020, Oman announced that its ambassador had submitted his letters of credence to Syrian Foreign Minister Walid al-Muallem, acting in accordance with the royal decree of March. This made Oman the first Gulf Arab country since 2012.

On 9 November 2021, UAE Foreign Minister Abdullah bin Zayed Al Nahyan visited Damascus and met with President Bashar al-Assad, becoming the highest Emirati official to visit Syria in a decade. On 26 November 2021, Algerian President Abdelmadjid Tebboune said that the Arab Summit which his country was scheduled to host was supposed to be “comprehensive” and a launch for mending the “torn” Arab ranks.

On 18 March 2022, Syrian President Bashar al-Assad visited the UAE in his first trip to an Arab country since the beginning of the crisis in his country. This was his first foreign trip to any country other than Iran and Russia. He met during the visit with Abu Dhabi Crown Prince Mohammed bin Zayed and Dubai Ruler Mohammed bin Rashid Al Maktoum.

On 20 February 2023, al-Assad arrived in Muscat in Oman for a working visit and was received by Sultan Haitham bin Tariq.

On 19 March 2023, the Syrian President al-Assad, accompanied by his wife Asma, conducted an official visit to the Emirates. The President of the UAE, Mohammed bin Zayed, received him at the airport in Abu Dhabi. The Emirates had provided large assistance following the earthquake of 6 February.

On 12 April 2023, Faisal al-Miqdad, Syria's Minister of Foreign Affairs and Expatriates, visited Jeddah, Saudi Arabia, in the first official visit since the breaking of relations. During the meeting with his Saudi counterpart, Prince Faisal bin Farhan Al Saud, the two sides issued a statement discussing the realization of a settlement that would reintegrate Syria into its Arab environment and the need for a political solution guaranteeing Syrian unity. They also stressed the importance of supporting the Syrian state in restoring its control, ending the presence of armed militias, and strengthening joint efforts to combat drug smuggling. On 14 April 2023, foreign ministers from the Gulf Cooperation Council, Jordan, Iraq, and Egypt held a consultative meeting on Syria.

On 1 May 2023, the foreign ministers of Jordan, Saudi Arabia, Iraq, Egypt, and Syria met in Amman, Jordan. They addressed the humanitarian, security, and political aspects based on the “step-for-step” initiative. The final communiqué stated that successive meetings would follow with the aim of reaching a solution to the Syrian crisis in accordance with Resolution 2254. The priorities included:

1. Expanding the scope of humanitarian aid.
2. Creating conditions necessary for the return of refugees.
3. Eliminating drug production in Syria and forming follow-up security and political committees.
4. Resuming the work of the Constitutional Committee to achieve a political solution fulfilling Resolution 2254.
5. Cooperation among the Syrian government, the concerned states, and the United Nations to formulate an integrated strategy to consolidate security and fight terrorism.

On 14 February 2024, the U.S. House of Representatives passed the draft of the “Assad Regime Anti-Normalization Act for 2023” by a vote of 389 in favor and 32 opposed. The bill urges the United States not to recognize or normalize relations with any Syrian government led by Bashar al-Assad and to develop an annual strategy for countering the normalization of ties between states and the Syrian regime. The draft was sent to the Senate, but no final vote occurred, and consequently it did not enter into force as law. This measure also reinforces the Caesar Act by extending the duration of its main sanctions until the end of 2032.

== See also ==
- Syrian–Turkish normalization
- Arab–Israeli normalization
- Iran–Saudi Arabia proxy war
