= United Nations Security Council Resolution 480 =

UN Security Council Resolution 480
- International Court of Justice
- Date: 12 November 1980
- Meeting no.: 2,255
- Code: S/RES/480 (Document)
- Subject: International Court of Justice
- Voting summary: 15 voted for; None voted against; None abstained
- Result: Adopted

Security Council composition
- Permanent members: China; France; Soviet Union; United Kingdom; United States
- Non-permanent members: Bangladesh; East Germany; Jamaica; Mexico; Niger; Norway; Philippines; Portugal; Tunisia; Zambia

United Nations Security Council resolution 480, adopted unanimously on 12 November 1980, after noting the deaths of International Court of Justice (ICJ) judges Richard R. Baxter and Salah el-Dine Tarazi, the Council decided that elections to the two vacancies on the ICJ would take place on 15 January 1981 at the Security Council and General Assembly.

== See also ==
- List of United Nations Security Council Resolutions 401 to 500 (1976–1982)
