= Salah el-Dine Tarazi =

Syrian jurist and diplomat

His excellency Salah El-Din Tarazi
- صلاح الدين ترزي
- Tarazi in 1963

4th Permanent Representative of Syria to the United Nations
- In office 1962–1964
- President: Nazim al-Qudsi; Lu'ay al-Atassi; Amin al-Hafiz
- Preceded by: Rafik Asha
- Succeeded by: George Tomeh

Judge of the International Court of Justice
- In office February 1976 – 4 October 1980
- Preceded by: Fouad Ammoun
- Succeeded by: Abdallah Fikri El-Khani

Personal details
- Born: 1917 Damascus, Ottoman Syria (present day Syria)
- Died: October 4, 1980 (aged 62–63) Den Haag, the Netherlands
- Party: National Bloc (until 1947)
- Education: Damascus University
- Profession: Lawyer, Diplomat, Professor

Salah El-Dine Tarazi (Arabic: صلاح الدين ترزي, romanized: Ṣalāḥ ad-Dīn Tarazī; 24 December 1917 – 4 October 1980 in) was a Syrian lawyer and diplomat. He represented his homeland at the meetings of the General Assembly of the United Nations and as an ambassador to various countries. He served as a judge at the International Court of Justice from 1976 until his death.

== Life and career ==
Salah el-Dine Tarazi was born in Damascus in 1917 and completed his legal education at the Collège des Frères there and at the École Française de Droit in Beirut. He then worked as a lawyer in his hometown from 1940 to 1947. After his doctorate in 1945, he taught public law at the University of Damascus from 1946 to 1949. In addition, he worked for the Syrian Ministry of Finance from 1945 to 1947.

In 1949, he began a diplomatic career in the Ministry of Foreign Affairs, where, interrupted by a position in 1951/1952 as chargé d'affaires in Belgium, he became Secretary General. He was then ambassador to the Soviet Union (1957/1958 and 1965–1970), Czechoslovakia (1958/1959), in China (1960/1961) and the Turkey (1970–1974). From 1962 to 1964 he was the Permanent Representative of Syria to the United Nations.

In addition, he represented Syria regularly between 1949 and 1971 at the sessions of the General Assembly of the United Nations and in 1968 at the negotiations on the Vienna Convention on the Law of Treaties. In 1978 he worked as a lecturer at the Hague Academy of International Law. Three years earlier he had been elected as judge at the International Court of Justice in The Hague. His regular nine-year term of office began in February 1976. In October 1980 he died in a traffic accident in The Hague. In accordance with the United Nations Security Council Resolution 480, his compatriot Abdallah Fikri El-Khani was elected to succeed him for the remainder of his term.

== Literature ==
- Biography. Salah El Dine Tarazi. In: Recueil Des Cours. Band 159. Martinus Nijhoff Publishers, Den Haag 1979, ISBN 90-286-0359-X, S. 349
- Judge Salah El Dine Tarazi. In: Yearbook of the International Court of Justice 1979–1980. Band 34. United Nations Publications, Den Haag 1979, S. 24
- Salah El Dine Tarazi. In: Arthur Eyffinger, Arthur Witteveen, Mohammed Bedjaoui: La Cour internationale de Justice 1946–1996. Martinus Nijhoff Publishers, Den Haag und London 1999, ISBN 90-411-0468-2, S. 331
