= Mikhail Wehbe =

Syrian diplomat (1942–2022)

His Excellency Mikhail Wehbe
- ميخائيل وهبة

12th Syrian Permanent Representative to the United Nations
- In office 29 October 1996 – 18 September 2003
- President: Hafez al-Assad; Bashar al-Assad
- Preceded by: Dia Allah El-Fattal
- Succeeded by: Faisal Mekdad

Personal details
- Born: 27 February 1942 Damascus, French Mandate of Syria
- Died: 12 July 2022 (aged 80) Lexington, Kentucky, United States
- Children: 2
- Education: Lebanese University; Sofia University
- Profession: Politician, diplomat

Mikhail Wehbe (Arabic: ميخائيل وهبة; 27 February 1942 – 12 July 2022) was a Syrian diplomat and former Permanent Representative of Syria to the United Nations between 1996 and 2003.

== Education ==
Mikhail Wehbe was born in Damascus in 1942. He graduated from the Lebanese University with a Bachelor of Arts in Political Sciences and Public Administration. He also held a Ph.D. in International law from Sofia University, Bulgaria. He spoke four languages, Arabic, English, French and Bulgarian.

== Career ==
Wehbe served as the first secretary, Geneve, Switzerland, First Secretary, London, United Kingdom, Including as Permanent Representative of the Syrian Arab Republic to the United Nations New York, United States of America (1996-2003), Including as Ambassador of the Syrian Arab Republic to the United Nations Geneve, Switzerland; Chief of the Private Offices Department and Member of the Consultative Council for Administrative and Management Affairs at the Ministry of Foreign Affairs of Syria (1988); Counselor and Minister Counselor of the Syrian Embassy in Sofia, Bulgaria (1982–88); and Chief of the Cabinet of the Minister of State for Foreign Affairs (1979-1982).

During his tenure at the United Nations he served twice as the President of the United Nations Security Council when Syria was holding a rotating seat at the council, in June 2002 and August 2003. He also served as the Permanent Observer of the Arab League to the United Nations in Vienna, Austria.
