= Bashar Jaafari =

Syrian diplomat

His Excellency Bashar Jaafari
- بشار الجعفري
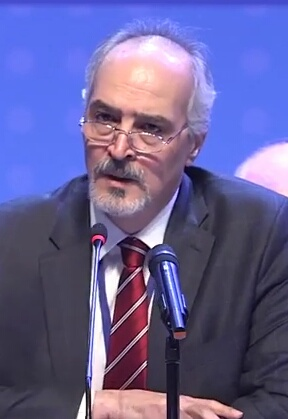
- Bashar Jaafari in 2017

Ambassador of Syria to Russia
- In office 5 October 2022 – 8 December 2024 (de facto)
- Preceded by: Riad Haddad

Deputy Minister of Foreign Affairs
- In office 22 November 2020 – 5 October 2022
- President: Bashar al-Assad
- Prime Minister: Hussein Arnous
- Preceded by: Faisal Mekdad
- Succeeded by: Bassam al-Sabbagh

14th Permanent Representative of Syria to the United Nations
- In office 31 July 2006 – 22 November 2020
- President: Bashar al-Assad
- Preceded by: Faisal Mekdad
- Succeeded by: Bassam al-Sabbagh

Personal details
- Born: April 14, 1956 (age 70) Damascus, Syria
- Party: Ba'ath Party
- Children: 3
- Education: University of Damascus; University of Sceaux; University of Paris; Syarif Hidayatullah State Islamic University Jakarta
- Profession: Diplomat

Bashar Jaafari, also Ja'afari, (Arabic: بشار الجعفري; born April 14, 1956) is a Syrian diplomat who served as the Permanent Representative of Syria to the United Nations (PermRep) from 2006 to 2020. As PermRep, Jaafari was the Assad regime's lead negotiator during the Syrian peace process with the Syrian opposition.

Jaafari was later Deputy Foreign Minister from 2020 to 2022, then Ambassador of Syria to Russia from 2022 to 2024.

== Education ==
Born in 1956, Jaafari has a Bachelor of Arts and French literature, a Diploma of Higher Studies in translation and Arabization from the University of Damascus, a Diploma of International Political Relations from the International Institute of Public Administration, a Diploma of Higher Studies in International Organization's Management and a Doctorate 3rd cycle in political science from the University of Sceaux, State Doctorate in political science from the Paris University and a State Doctorate in History of Islamic Civilization in South East Asia from the University of Sharif Hedayatullah.

== Diplomatic career ==
Jaafari began his career in 1980 as a diplomat in the Syrian Foreign Ministry. His first diplomatic posting was to Paris until 1983. He was adviser to the Permanent Representative of Syria to the United Nations in 1991. He later returned to France as an adviser at the Syrian embassy in Paris in 1997. He was also appointed as the Syrian ambassador to Indonesia in 1998 and as director of the International Organizations Department at the Syrian Foreign Ministry in 2002.

=== Permanent Representative to the United Nations ===
Jaafari became the Permanent Representative of Syria to the United Nations (PermRep) in 2006. After the outbreak of the Syrian revolution, Jaafari was the public face of the Assad regime amidst crackdowns on protestors. Jaafari known as a strident defender of the Assad regime.

In response to a 2012 UN report that stated the Assad regime was guilty of committing violence against children since the start of the Syrian insurgency, Jaafari called the allegations hostile propaganda and denied the Syrian government was violating the rights of children. Jaafari dismissed the conclusions of the 2016 report of the OPCW-UN Joint Investigative Mechanism that determined the Syrian Air Force use chlorine in separate attacks in Talmanes and Sarmin.

In 2014, the U.S. State Department restricted Jaafari's movements to a 40 km radius around Manhattan, similar to such restrictions against the PermReps from Iran and North Korea.

During an emergency meeting of the UN Security Council (UNSC) on 15 December 2016, Jaafari used a fake photo that he falsely claimed was a Syrian soldier assisting a Syrian woman in an attempt to positively portray Syrian government forces during the Battle of Aleppo. The photo was actually taken in Fallujah, Iraq, during the Battle of Fallujah. On 18 December, Jaafari stated that Aleppo would be "clean" of "terrorist" by that evening.

Jaafari called a United Nations General Assembly vote on 22 December 2016 to establish a special team to collect, consolidate, preserve, and analyze evidence and to prepare cases on war crimes and human rights abuses "a flagrant interference in the internal affairs of a UN member state."

After the UNSC adopted Resolution 2401 in 2018 that called for a ceasefire in Syria for 30 days amidst the siege of Eastern Ghouta, Jaafari stated that the regime would continue to practice "a sovereign right of self-defense" and would go after what it deemed were terrorist groups.

==== Syrian peace process ====
As PermRep, Jaafari was the Assad regime's lead negotiator during the Syrian peace process with the Syrian opposition. Jaafari stated at the 2014 Geneva II Conference on Syria that stopping terrorism, not power-sharing, was the priority for talks between the Syrian government and opposition representatives, a stance the New York Times indicated would promise more confrontation. At the 2016 Geneva peace talks, he rejected any prospect of dealing with Mohammed Alloush, head of the opposition's High Negotiations Committee (HNC), until Alloush shaved his beard. This came as Assad regime consistently case their opponents bent on a violent Islamist takeover of Syria. Jaafari had constantly hampering the talks by focusing on the composition of the HNC and pointing to the Islamism of its members.

=== Later career ===
On 22 November 2020, Jaafari became the Deputy Minister of Foreign Affairs. Jaafari then became Ambassador of Syria to Russia on 5 October 2022.

After the fall of the Assad regime in December 2024, Jaafari's sudden support for the political change was covered in news media. Criticism on social media highlighted Jaafari's strident support for Assad and accusation that the civilians of Ghouta were responsible for the Ghouta chemical attack.

== Personal life ==
Jaafari is from Damascus and hails from the sunni sect. In the early days of the Syrian civil war, Jaafari's daughter Sheherazad "Sherry" Jaafari was among the group of young Western-educated women in Syrian President Bashar al-Assad's inner circle, advising Assad on press relations and other matters. She played a role in preparing Assad for an interview with Barbara Walters in 2011. Foreign Policy characterized messages between Shery and Assad as flirtatious and playful banter. Walters expressed regret for hiring Jaafari and helping her obtain an internship and admission to the School of International and Public Affairs at Columbia University.

In 2017, Jaafari sued his daughter Yara's former husband, actor Mustafa El Khani, accusing him of defamation and libel after he accused his son Amir of attacking a police detachment in Damascus in a post on Facebook.

Jaafari sought asylum, along with his family in Russia in April 2025 because his assets had been confiscated and his life was in grave danger in the Syria, and the changes with the political new political elite of Syria.

== Books ==
- The Lobbies in the U.S.A (Damascus, 1983)
- The Syrian Foreign Affairs 1946–1982 (Damascus, 1986)
- The United Nations and the New World Order (Damascus, 1994)
- Moslem High Priests of the Far East "Historical Saga on the Way Islam Entered and Spread into the Malay Archipelago (Damascus, 2003)
- The Syrian Politics of Alliances 1918–1982 (Damascus, 2015)

Diplomatic posts
Preceded by Faisal Meqdad	Syrian Ambassador to the United Nations; 2006–2020	Succeeded by Bassam al-Sabbagh
