= Qusay al-Dahhak =

Syrian politician and diplomat

His Excellency Koussay al-Dahhak
- قصي الضحاك

16th Permanent Representative of Syria to the United Nations
- In office 20 December 2023 – 19 August 2025
- President: Bashar al-Assad; Ahmed al-Sharaa
- Preceded by: Bassam al-Sabbagh
- Succeeded by: Ibrahim Olabi

Personal details
- Born: Salamiyah, Hama Governorate, Syria
- Party: Ba'ath Party (until 2024)
- Education: University of Algiers (LLM)
- Profession: Politician, Diplomat

Koussay (Qusay) Abdul Jabbar al-Dahhak (Arabic: قصي عبد الجبار الضحاك) is a Syrian politician and diplomat who has held the position of Syria's Permanent Representative to the United Nations from December 2023 to August 2025. He submitted his credentials to the Secretary-General of the United Nations António Guterres and assumed his duties as Ambassador and Permanent Representative on January 31, 2024

== Career ==
He has held several administrative and governmental positions since the beginning of his career in 2001, where he worked as third secretary at the Syrian Embassy in the People's Republic of China from 2004 to 2009 and a diplomat in the Permanent Delegation of Syria to the United Nations in New York from 2012 to 2016.

He was the director of the Department of International Organizations and Conferences at the Syrian Ministry of Foreign Affairs from 2016 to 2018. Then he was a counselor at the Permanent Mission in New York from 2018 to 2020, and was Deputy Head of the Syrian Permanent Delegation to the United Nations 2020 - 2022. Between 2022 and 2023, he was again the director of the Department of International Organizations and Conferences at the ministry. In December 2023 he was promoted to the position of Ambassador and Permanent Representative, succeeding Bassam al-Sabbagh, and was sworn in by President Bashar al-Assad. on September 4, 2024 he submitted his credential as the non-resident ambassador of Syria to Nicaragua in a virtual ceremony. At a later stage he was appointed as the non-resident ambassador of Syria to the United Mexican States, but didn't submit his credentials due to the fall of Assad regime.

After the fall of the Assad regime in December 2024, he said that the opposition offensives took him by surprise, and that he and his team in New York will continue their work and will represent and defend the interests of the Syrian people till the creation of a new government and receiving further instructions. They are in contact with the Foreign Ministry in Damascus and will operate under the new authority to ensure the continuity of state institutions. He also said that he hopes Syrians will be able to make a better future and a new state built on freedom, equality, secularism, democracy, and rule of law, and opposed the Israeli airstrikes against Syria.

== Personal life ==
He is the son of Syrian biology professor and former diplomat Abdul Jabbar al-Dahhak who served as the Minister of Oil and Ambassador of Syria to Algeria. Abdul Jabbar later worked as a professor in the Biology Faculty of the University of Damascus before dying in 2020.
