= Hammud al-Shufi =

Syrian politician

His excellency Hammud al-Shufi
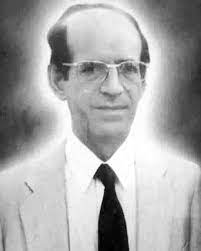

8th Permanent Representative of Syria to the United Nations
- In office 6 June 1978 – 18 May 1981
- Preceded by: Mowaffak Allaf
- Succeeded by: Dia Allah El-Fattal

Regional Secretary of the Regional Command of the Syrian Regional Branch
- In office 5 September 1963 – 1 February 1964
- Secretary General: Michel Aflaq
- Succeeded by: Shibli Aysami

Head of the Organization Bureau of the Regional Command
- In office March 1963 – 5 September 1963
- Succeeded by: Unknown

Member of the Regional Command of the Syrian Regional Branch
- In office March 1963 – 1 February 1964

Personal details
- Born: 10 August 1935
- Died: 13 April 2011 (aged 75)
- Party: Syrian Regional Branch of the Arab Socialist Ba'ath Party

Hammud al-Shufi (Arabic: حمود الشوفي) was a Syrian politician, and is mostly known for his short stint as Regional Secretary of the Regional Command of the Syrian Regional Branch of the Arab Socialist Ba'ath Party in the early-to-mid 1960s.

== Life ==
Little is known about Shufi's before his election as Head of the Organization Bureau of the party's Regional Command in March 1963. He came from al-Suwayda, a Druze city. In al-Suwayda Shufi worked as a school teacher. From the dissolution of the Syrian Regional Branch by Aflaq and al-Bitar in 1958 to its resurrection in 1962, Shufi was able to keep the Suwayda Ba'ath branch alive with vigor. He became known as a somewhat local firebrand. As a thinker he was inspired leftist Ba'athists Ali Salih al-Sa'di and Yasin al-Hafiz.

At the time of his appointment to the post of Head of the Organization Bureau, Shufi was 36 years of age. He was appointed to head the Organization Bureau because Michel Aflaq and Salah al-Din al-Bitar, the party's leaders, believed him to be one of their loyal followers. On his and Nureddin al-Atassi appointment to the National Council for the Revolutionary Command, Sami al-Jundi wrote derogatorily "... and so two reverent disciples join the Council ... ready to please the master [Aflaq] and please his will". However, Shufi was devoid of any reverence to the party's leaders and would become the leader of the party's Marxist faction. On the Regional Command, in which he was elected to in March 1963, Shufi and his followers became allied to the Military Committee faction, a faction staunchly opposed to Aflaq's and al-Bitar's leadership.

The 1st Regional Congress (held in September 1963) elected Shufi as Regional Secretary of the Syrian Regional Branch and its Regional Command. The Military Committee submitted a report to the 2nd Regional Congress in which it accused Shufi of the electoral irregularities and the factionalism which took place during 1st Regional Congress because of his position as Organization Bureau head. At the 6th National Congress Shufi, alongside al-Sadi from Iraq, dominated procedures. Aflaq was barely able to hold on to his position as Secretary General, while al-Bitar was not reelected to the National Command. When the Iraqi Ba'athists were ousted from power in 1963, the party's Marxist faction were blamed for the disaster. Shufi and his supporters were expelled from the Ba'ath Party by the Extraordinary Regional and National Congresses (held in February 1964).

Shufi would not play an important role in national politics again until after the Corrective Movement in which Hafez al-Assad came to power. He served for a short while as Syria's Permanent Representative to the United Nations, resigning from his post on 27 December 1979. Three years later, in New York City, United States in 1982, Shufi announced the establishment of a government-in-exile, called the National Alliance for the Liberation of Syria (NALS). NALS had 20 members, which included the Muslim Brootherhood. The organization opposed what it considered the anti-democratic government in Syria.

== Notes ==
- Arnold, Guy (1990). Revolutionary and Dissident Movements: an International Guide. Longman Publishing Group. ISBN 0582086922.
- Rabinovich, Itamar (1972). Syria Under the Baʻth, 1963–66: The Army Party Symbiosis. Transaction Publishers.
- Seale, Patrick (1990). Asad of Syria: The Struggle for the Middle East. University of California Press. ISBN 978-0-520-06976-3.
- Szajkowski, Bogdan; Degenhardt, Henry W. (2004). Revolutionary and Dissident Movements of the World. John Harper Publishing. ISBN 0954381122.
