= 1988 United Nations Security Council election =

Election to the United Nations Security Council

- 26 October 1988

5 of 10 non-permanent seats on the United Nations Security Council
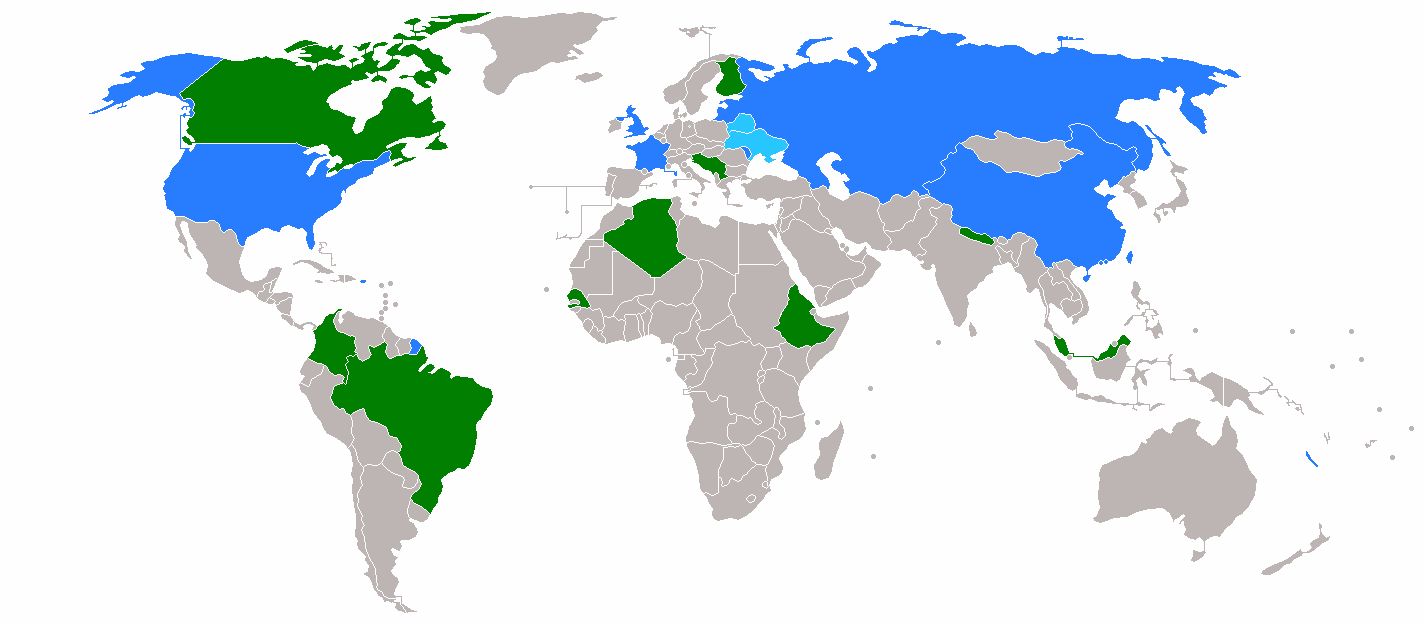
- United Nations Security Council membership after the election Permanent members Non-permanent members
- Outgoing members Zambia (Africa) Japan (Asia) Argentina (GRULAC) Italy (WEOG) West Germany (WEOG) Elected members Ethiopia (Africa) Malaysia (Asia) Colombia (GRULAC) Canada (WEOG) Finland (WEOG)

- Unsuccessful candidates
- Bangladesh (Asia)
- Greece (WEOG)

The 1988 United Nations Security Council election was held on 26 October 1988 during the Forty-third session of the United Nations General Assembly, held at United Nations Headquarters in New York City. The General Assembly elected Canada, Colombia, Ethiopia, Finland, and Malaysia, as the five new non-permanent members of the UN Security Council for two-year mandates commencing on 1 January 1989.

== Rules ==
The Security Council has 15 seats, filled by five permanent members and ten non-permanent members. Each year, half of the non-permanent members are elected for two-year terms. A sitting member may not immediately run for re-election.

In accordance with the rules whereby the ten non-permanent UNSC seats rotate among the various regional blocs into which UN member states traditionally divide themselves for voting and representation purposes, the five available seats are allocated as follows:

- One for African countries (held by Zambia)
- One for countries from the Asian Group (now called the Asia-Pacific Group) (held by Japan)
- One for Latin America and the Caribbean (held by Argentina)
- Two for the Western European and Others Group (held by Italy and West Germany)

To be elected, a candidate must receive a two-thirds majority of those present and voting. If the vote is inconclusive after the first round, three rounds of restricted voting shall take place, followed by three rounds of unrestricted voting, and so on, until a result has been obtained. In restricted voting, only official candidates may be voted on, while in unrestricted voting, any member of the given regional group, with the exception of current Council members, may be voted on.

== Result ==
Voting was conducted on a single ballot. Ballots containing more states from a certain region than seats allocated to that region were invalidated. Following the first round, the representatives of Bangladesh withdrew their candidacy.

Member	Round 1	Round 2	Round 3
Colombia	154	—	—
Ethiopia	144	—	—
Canada	127	—	—
Malaysia	104	143	—
Finland	100	99	110
Greece	77	56	47
Bangladesh	55	5	—
Somalia	3	—	—
Cuba	2	—	—
Bahamas	1	—	—
Mauritius	1	—	—
Sudan	1	—	—
abstentions	0	0	0
invalid ballots	0	0	1
required majority	105	106	105
ballot papers	157	158	158

== See also ==
- List of members of the United Nations Security Council
- Canada and the United Nations
