= Bassam al-Sabbagh =

Syrian politician and diplomat

- بسام الصباغ
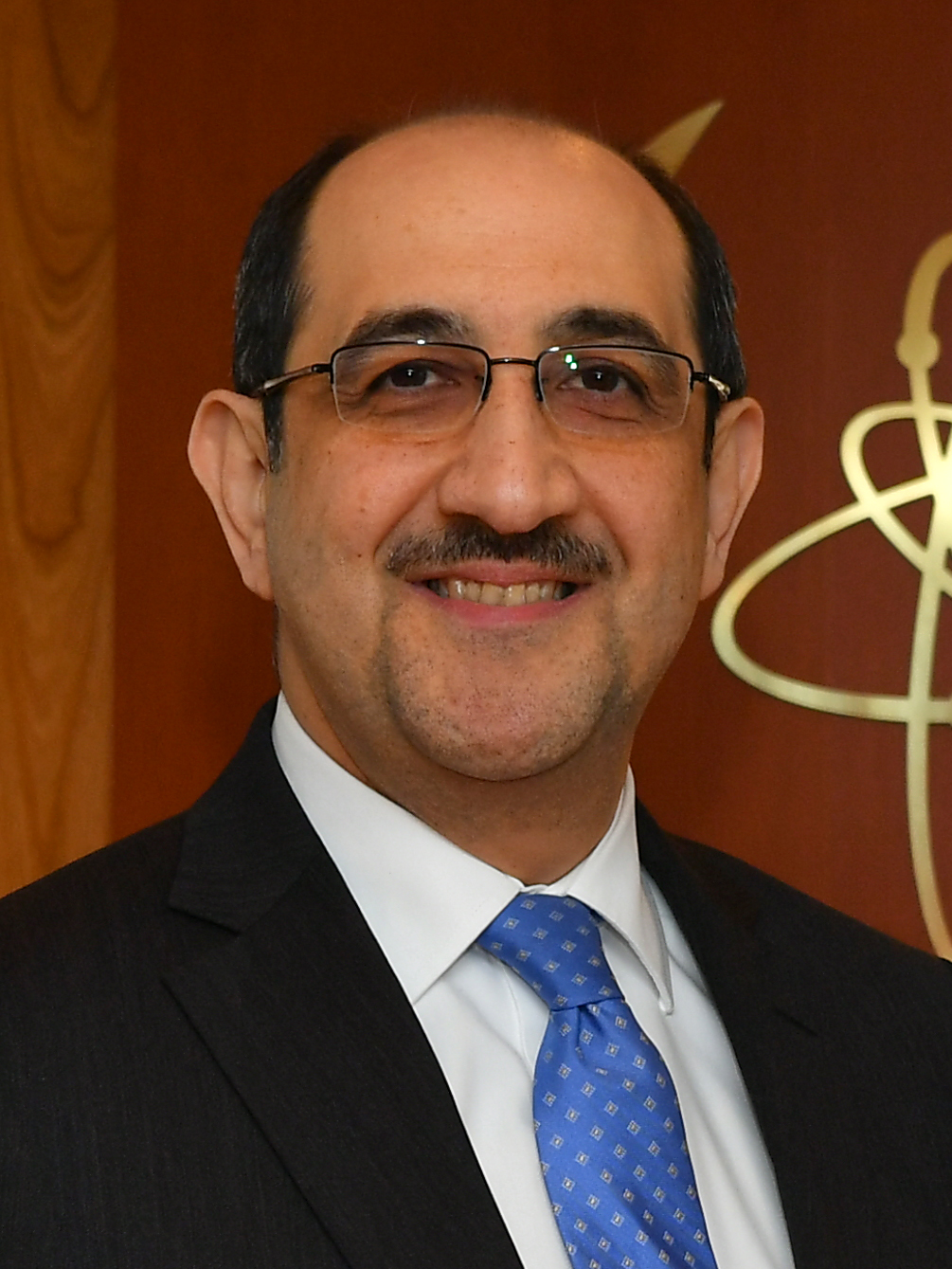
- al-Sabbagh in 2019

Minister of Foreign Affairs and Expatriates
- In office 23 September 2024 – 10 December 2024
- President: Bashar al-Assad
- Prime Minister: Mohammad Ghazi al-Jalali
- Preceded by: Faisal Mekdad
- Succeeded by: Asaad al-Shaibani

Deputy Minister of Foreign Affairs
- In office 17 October 2023 – 23 September 2024
- President: Bashar al-Assad
- Prime Minister: Hussein Arnous
- Preceded by: Bashar Jaafari
- Succeeded by: Ayman Raad

15th Permanent Representative of Syria to the United Nations
- In office 22 November 2020 – 17 October 2023
- President: Bashar al-Assad
- Preceded by: Bashar Jaafari
- Succeeded by: Qusay al-Dahhak

Permanent Representative of Syria to the Organisation for the Prohibition of Chemical Weapons
- In office 31 October 2013 – 22 November 2020
- President: Bashar al-Assad
- Preceded by: Office established
- Succeeded by: Milad Attiya

Ambassador to Austria
- In office 2010 – 22 November 2020
- President: Bashar al-Assad
- Succeeded by: Hassan Khaddour

Member of the Central Committee of the Ba'ath Party
- In office 4 May 2024 – 8 December 2024

Personal details
- Born: 1 January 1969 (age 57) Aleppo, Syria
- Party: Ba'ath Party
- Education: Aleppo University; Damascus Higher Institute for Political Science
- Profession: Diplomat

Bassam al-Sabbagh (Arabic: بسام الصباغ; born 1 January 1969) is a Syrian diplomat and politician who served as the Foreign and Expatriates Minister of Syria from 22 September 2024 to 8 December 2024. He is the last person to serve in this position under president Bashar al-Assad and of the Syrian Arab Republic. He also served as Permanent Representative of Syria to the United Nations in New York City between 2020 and 2023.

Sabbagh is former Syria's permanent representative to the United Nations Office at Vienna the United Nations Office at Vienna, its former permanent representative to the Organisation for the Prohibition of Chemical Weapons, and its former permanent representative to the International Atomic Energy Agency.

== Biography ==
He was born on 1 January 1969 in Aleppo, Syria. In 1993, graduated from the University of Aleppo as a specialist in international relations, and has a bachelor's degree in political science from the Higher Institute of Political Science in Damascus.

He also served as Syrian Permanent Representative to the United Nations from 2020 to 2023. He addressed the General debate of the seventy-eighth session of the United Nations General Assembly in 2023. He was appointed as Foreign and Expatriates Minister on 23 September 2024.

According to Sabbagh, he attempted to persuade Bashar al-Assad to enter into a political process to avert his overthrow, to no avail. Sabbagh was in Damascus when the government fell in December 2024, and expressed surprise that Assad fled.

== Career ==
- 1994–1995 – Attaché in the Ministry of Foreign Affairs of Syria
- 1995–2000 – Second, then First Secretary of the Syrian Embassy in Washington
- 2000–2001 – Alternate Director in the Office of the Deputy Minister of Foreign Affairs
- 2001–2006 – Counselor at the Permanent Mission of Syria to the UN (New York)
- 2006–2010 – Head of Administration at the Syrian Ministry of Foreign Affairs
- 2010–2013 – Permanent Representative of Syria to the UN Office (Vienna)
- 2010–2020 – Ambassador to Austria, Slovakia, Slovenia, and Italy.
- 2010–2020 – Resident Representative to the IAEA, UNIDO, UNODC (Vienna)
- 2013–2020 – Permanent Representative of Syria to the Organisation for the Prohibition of Chemical Weapons (The Hague).
- 2020–2023 – Head of the Syrian Mission at the UN Headquarters in New York
- 2023–2024 – Deputy Minister of Foreign Affairs and Expatriates
- 2024-2024 – Minister of Foreign Affairs and Expatriates

Diplomatic posts
Preceded by Bashar Jaafari	Syrian Ambassador to the United Nations; 2020–2023	Succeeded by Qusay al-Dahhak
