= 2010 United Nations Security Council election =

Election to the United Nations Security Council

- 12 October 2010

5 of 10 non-permanent seats on the United Nations Security Council
- United Nations Security Council membership after the election Permanent members Non-permanent members
- Outgoing members Uganda (Africa) Japan (Asia–Pacific) Mexico (GRULAC) Turkey (WEOG) Austria (WEOG) Elected members South Africa (Africa) India (Asia–Pacific) Colombia (GRULAC) Germany (WEOG) Portugal (WEOG)

- Unsuccessful candidate
- Canada (WEOG)

The 2010 United Nations Security Council election was held on 12 October 2010 during the 65th session of the United Nations General Assembly at United Nations Headquarters in New York City. The elections were for five non-permanent seats on the UN Security Council for two-year mandates commencing on 1 January 2011. The General Assembly elected Colombia, Germany, India, Portugal, and South Africa.

== Rules ==
In accordance with the Security Council's rotation rules, whereby the ten non-permanent UNSC seats rotate among the various regional blocs into which UN member states traditionally divide themselves for voting and representation purposes, the five available seats were allocated as follows:

- One for the African Group (previously held by Uganda)
- One for the Asian Group (previously held by Japan)
- One for the Latin American and Caribbean Group (previously held by Mexico)
- Two for the Western European and Others Group (previously held by Turkey and Austria)

The five members served on the Security Council for the 2011–12 period.

== Candidates ==
For the WEOG seats, Germany, Canada and Portugal stood for election. India ran uncontested for the Asian seat since Kazakhstan stood aside. South Africa also ran uncontested for the African seat after being endorsed by the African Union. After dropping out in favour of Brazil in the 2009 election, Colombia also ran unopposed.

== Elected members ==
Africa: South Africa replaces Uganda
Asia: India replaces Japan
GRULAC: Colombia replaces Mexico
WEOG: Germany and Portugal replace Austria and Turkey

== Results ==
The results in the three uncontested seats were as follows: India received 187 votes, South Africa 182 votes and Colombia 186 votes.

=== African and Asian States ===
2010 UNSC African and Asian States election
Nation	Votes
India	187
South Africa	182
Pakistan	1
Swaziland	1
Ballot papers	191
Abstentions	1
Invalid ballots	0
Valid ballots	191

=== Latin American and Caribbean States ===
2010 UNSC Latin American and Caribbean States election
Nation	Votes
Colombia	186
Ballot papers	191
Abstentions	5
Invalid ballots	0
Valid ballots	191
Members voting	186
Required majority	124

=== Western European and Others Group ===
For the two Western European and Others Seats the results were as follows:

==== Round 1 ====
2010 UNSC WEOG election
Nation	Votes
Germany	128
Portugal	121
Canada	114
Ballot papers	191
Abstentions	1
Valid ballots	191

Germany was elected as they passed the two-thirds majority.

==== Round 2 ====
2010 UNSC WEOG election round 2
Nation	Votes
Portugal	113
Canada	78
Ballot papers	192
Abstentions	0
Invalid ballots	1
Valid ballots	191

Following this round of voting Canada officially withdrew its candidacy.

==== Round 3 ====
2010 UNSC WEOG election round 3
Nation	Votes
Portugal	150
Canada	32
Ballot papers	185
Abstentions	2
Invalid ballots	1
Valid ballots	182

Some states continued to vote for Canada, as withdrawal of candidacy is not binding and member states may vote for any state they please. However, the withdrawal was sufficient to ensure the election of Portugal by a two-thirds majority.

== Reactions ==
=== Canada ===
Canadian Foreign Minister Lawrence Cannon acknowledged that foreign policy under the Conservative government had played a role in the loss – even as he said that policy is based on sound democratic and human rights principles. "We will not back down from our principles that form the basis of our great country, and we will continue to pursue them on the international stage," Cannon said. "Some would even say that, because of our attachment to those values, we lost a seat on the council. If that's the case, then so be it." Blame was also shifted toward Liberal Party of Canada leader Michael Ignatieff for the defeat by the Conservative Party of Canada, though he rejected the blame as "ridiculous". "The blame game is a sign of a government that is unwilling to absorb the lessons of defeat." He, along with his foreign affairs critic Bob Rae, also said Prime Minister Stephen Harper had "paid the price" for a change in the foreign relations of Canada away from the traditional path of the Liberal and Progressive Conservative governments since the second half of the twentieth century. They cited Canada's tradition of peacekeeping missions, a balance in policies toward Israel and Palestine, aid and economic links with Africa and multilateral work on the environment and other global issues. One former diplomat said "We've suffered a loss that we haven't previously suffered in our foreign policy. It is a significant defeat for Canadian policy. We presented ourselves for a seat and the membership found us inadequate."

In a December 2011 interview, Canada's new foreign affairs minister John Baird attributed the failure to win a seat to principled positions taken by Canada on certain international issues: “Maybe if we had shut up, and not talked about gay rights in Africa; maybe if we had shut up and been more quiet about our concerns about Sri Lanka; maybe if we hadn't been so vocally against the deplorable human rights record in Iran, maybe Iran might have voted for us.... But we didn't and I don't think we regret anything. Iran probably voted against us; North Korea probably voted against us; Gadhafi probably voted against us. I think those are all badges of honour.”

=== India ===
India's envoy to the UN, Hardeep Singh Puri said "We have worked hard ... we have pushed for every single vote".

== See also ==
- List of members of the United Nations Security Council
- Canada and the United Nations
- Germany and the United Nations
- India and the United Nations
- European Union and the United Nations
