= Syrian–Turkish normalization =

Attempts to restore Syrian-Turkish relations

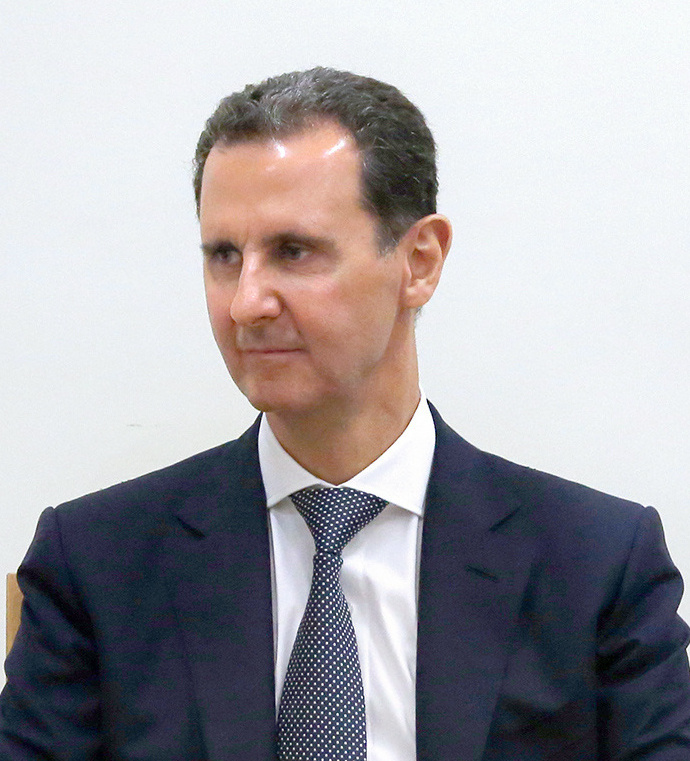
Bashar al-Assad

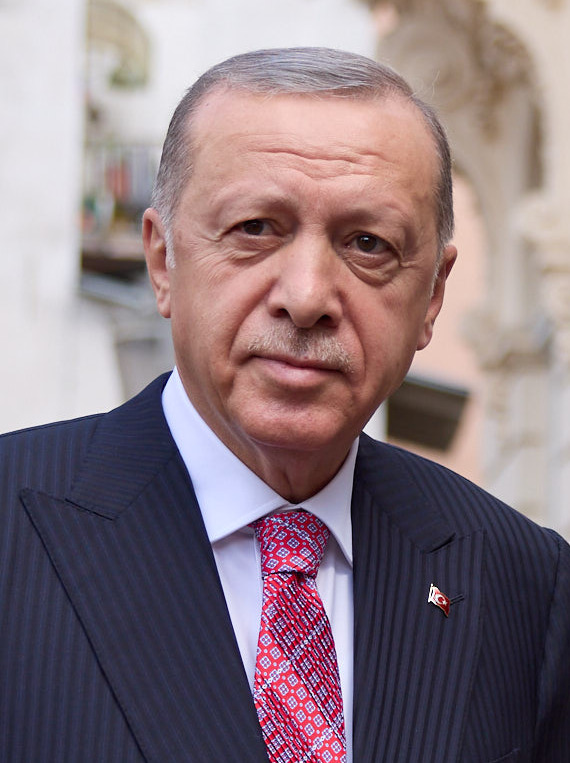
Recep Tayyip Erdoğan

The Syrian–Turkish normalization referred to efforts to restore relations between Syria and Turkey following the deterioration caused by the Syrian civil war. Prior to 2011, Turkey was generally regarded as a friendly neighbor of Ba'athist Syria. Diplomatic relations between the two countries were formally severed on 26 March 2012.

Regime media, loyalists, and observers asserted that tents were already pitched in April 2011, a few weeks after the start of the crisis. Throughout the years of fighting, the regime demanded that Turkey close its borders to fighters and stop supporting them, which would speed up the ending of the war.

The initial explicit endeavor can be traced back to August 2022, when Turkish Foreign Minister Mevlüt Çavuşoğlu articulated the potential for restoring Turkish-Syrian ties to their former state. This was contingent upon the Syrian Ba'athist government offering assurances of positive neighborly interactions, including measures to safeguard borders and combat terrorism and separatist activities.

The Syrian government's position was that no progress would be made in the negotiations unless Turkey was prepared to withdraw its forces from Syrian territory. The parties that sponsored the Turkish-Syrian reconciliation sought to convene a summit between the two nations' leaders. The opposition Syrian National Coalition neither supports nor opposes the initiative. In December 2022, a trilateral summit was held in Moscow between the defense ministers of Syria, Turkey, and Russia. On 7 July 2024, Turkish President Erdoğan stated that he could invite Assad to a meeting in Turkey at any time. Analysts have indicated that the main obstacle to the completion of the Turkish-Syrian reconciliation process are Turkish support for rebel groups and Turkish occupation of the Syrian territory.

In November–December 2024, Syrian government forces rapidly collapsed in the face of advances by opposition forces led by Hay'at Tahrir al-Sham and supported by Turkish-backed rebel groups of the Syrian National Army. Concurrently, Erdoğan stated that Assad failed to understand the value of the hand extended by Turkey.

After the fall of the Assad regime in December 2024, Turkey was regarded as the biggest winner of the changing situation. Ankara quickly restored diplomatic relations with Damascus.

== Background ==
The relationship between Syria and Turkey deteriorated significantly in the early 2010s, particularly after the outbreak of the Syrian Civil War in 2011. Initially, Turkey had cultivated close ties with Syria under the leadership of Recep Tayyip Erdoğan and Bashar al-Assad, emphasizing economic cooperation and diplomatic engagement. However, Turkey's support for the Syrian opposition and its demand for Assad's resignation in response to the Syrian government's violent crackdown on protests led to a severe rift between the two countries. This was evident in the Ankara's declaration of 26 March 2012 to shut down its embassy in Damascus to show disapproval of Assad. However, the consulate in Aleppo remained open. In June 2012, the Syrian Armed Forces shot down a Turkish fighter plane over Syrian territorial waters. Turkey became a key player in supporting anti-Assad factions, hosting millions of Syrian refugees, and allowing its territory to be used by rebel groups, further deepening tensions. The conflict escalated as Turkey became increasingly involved in military operations in northern Syria, aimed at both countering Kurdish groups it considers terrorist organizations and mitigating the influx of refugees. The involvement of Russia and Iran on the side of the Syrian government also complicated Turkey's position, contributing to the strain in Syrian-Turkish relations.

However, by the early 2020s, regional dynamics began shifting. Turkey, facing economic challenges and a complex geopolitical landscape, signaled a willingness to normalize relations with neighboring countries, including Syria. The rebuilding of ties was driven by pragmatic considerations, such as addressing security concerns along the border, managing refugee flows, and economic pressures. Talks brokered by Russia and other regional actors, as well as a broader trend of rapprochement in the Middle East, led to incremental steps toward improving relations. By 2022, while full normalization had not yet been achieved, there were noticeable efforts to reduce hostilities and open channels of communication between Ankara and Damascus.

== Issues ==
=== Refugees ===
A major catalyst for Turkey's rapprochement with Bashar al-Assad's government is the refugee crisis that has been ongoing for 13 years. Recently, Turkish political parties and forces expressed their desire to return Syrian refugees. Clashes and acts of violence between Turkish citizens and Syrian residents in Turkey have led to tension between the Syrian opposition and the Turkish authorities. The presence of millions of refugees also creates burdens on the Turkish economy, which is facing difficulties. The safe return of refugees to major cities is one of Türkiye's conditions for resuming relations.

=== Separatism ===
It was acknowledged that both parties were concerned about the separatist aspirations expressed by the autonomous administration in northeastern Syria, established in 2016. The Syrian Democratic Forces (SDF) sought to organize elections in the area, a proposal that was strongly opposed by Ankara.

=== Syrian reconciliation ===
Turkey calls for a solution to the Syrian conflict based on negotiations between the official opposition and the government in Damascus that lead to a comprehensive national unity government.

== Timeline ==
- 11 August 2022 – The Turkish Foreign Minister Mevlüt Çavuşoğlu announced that he had a short conversation with his Syrian counterpart, Faisal Mekdad, on the sidelines of the Non-Aligned Movement meeting in October 2021. Protests occur in Syrian opposition areas.
- 23 August 2022 – the Turkish Foreign Minister announces that his country has no preconditions for dialogue with Syria.
- September 2022, Turkish intelligence chief Hakan Fidan was reported to have visited Damascus
- 16 September 2022 – Hurriyet newspaper reports that Erdoğan wanted to meet Assad at the Shanghai Cooperation Organisation Summit in Uzbekistan.
- 17 March 2023 – In an interview during his visit to Russia, President Assad described President Erdoğan as a member of the Muslim Brotherhood, stating that Syrian-Turkish relations were worth zero compared to the supreme interest of the opportunistic Muslim Brotherhood agenda. At the same time, he announced his readiness to meet with Erdogan or anyone else if it serves Syria's interests, ends the war, and stops the bloodshed.
- 3 April 2023 – A meeting in Moscow for the three countries at the level of deputy foreign ministers, in addition to Iran, which was included
- 25 April 2023 – The defense ministers of the four countries met in Moscow to discuss strengthening security in Syria and normalization between Ankara and Damascus
- 7 May 2023 – The suspension of Syria's membership in the Arab League is lifted.
- 28 May 2023 – President Erdoğan wins a new five-year term. There are doubts about the possibility of continuing the normalization path.
- 17 July 2023 – President Erdoğan says that he is ready to meet with President Assad, but setting withdrawal as a condition for dialogue is "unacceptable." He added that the issue is their approach towards us. They want Turkey to leave northern Syria. This cannot happen, because we are fighting terrorism.
- 19 July 2023 – SDF leaders warn against normalization.
- 9 August 2023 – In an interview with Sky News Arabia, Assad said, "Our goal is Turkey's withdrawal from Syrian territory, but Erdoğan wants to legitimize Turkey's presence. Therefore, a meeting cannot take place on Erdoğan's terms." He then added, "Why would Erdoğan and I meet? To drink beverages?"
- 5 September 2023 – Erdoğan criticizes Syria, saying that it is not taking positive steps towards normalization.
- 28 May 2024 – Erdoğan's ally Devlet Bahçeli, leader of the Nationalist Movement Party, called for military cooperation with the Syrian government.
- 4 June 2024 – According to Foreign Minister Faisal Mekdad, the launch of negotiations with Ankara depends on two conditions: Turkey must formally express its intention to withdraw from occupied Syrian lands in a precise and binding manner and end its backing of rebel groups.
- 11 June 2024 – Aydınlık newspaper reports that a meeting was held between a military delegation from the Turkish Armed Forces and a Syrian military delegation at the Hmeimim base, Latakia, in a resumption of negotiations that have been suspended for a while. It was also reported that the next meeting will be held in Baghdad, Iraq.
- 26 June 2024 – Assad stated during his meeting with the Russian envoy Lavrentiev that his country is open to all initiatives related to relations with Turkey.
- 7 July 2024 – Turkish President Erdoğan stated that he could invite Assad to a meeting in Turkey at any time.
- 15 July 2024, Bashar al-Assad said: "From my position and from his [Erdoğan] position at the summit of power in our two countries, if the meeting leads to results or if the hug or if the scolding or if kissing the beards achieves the interest of the country then I will do it." "But the problem is not here. The problem does not lie in the meeting but in the content of the meeting. The proposal of the meeting may be important because the meeting is a means to achieve a goal. Okay what is the goal? We did not hear what the goal is. Solving the problem? Improving the relations? Returning them to their natural state?" "The first question we ask: Why did the relations leave their natural path for thirteen years? We have not heard any Turkish official speak about this point explicitly." "Therefore as we have said in more than one occasion and more than one statement we are positive toward any initiative to improve the relationship and this is the natural thing. No one thinks of creating problems with his neighbors. But this does not mean that we go without rules."
- 25 August 2024 – Assad told Parliament that efforts to mend ties with Turkey have not yet led to any tangible results.
- 3 September 2024 – the Russian Foreign Minister Sergey Lavrov stated that Turkey was ready to withdraw its forces from Syria.
- 10 September 2024 – During an Arab League meeting in Cairo, Foreign Minister Faisal Mekdad and his accompanying delegation walked out when invited Turkish Foreign Minister Hakan Fidan delivered his speech. This was attributed to Damascus' refusal to Ankara's attendance.
- 3 November 2024 – Turkish Foreign Minister Fidan revealed that Bashar al-Assad's government was not prepared to normalize relations with Turkey or reach an agreement with the opposition to end the conflict.
- 13 November 2024 – President Erdoğan expressed his optimism about meeting with Assad to guide Turkey-Syria relations onto the proper path. He added, "We must dismantle the terrorist structures between our countries. It is not us who threaten Syria's territorial integrity. It is the terrorist organizations, particularly the PKK and its Syrian branch, the PYD, that pose the threat. The threat does not even come from Syrians abroad."
- 27 November 2024 – Armed opposition and Idlib-based Tahrir al-Sham factions carry out assaults on cities and towns in northwestern Syria, capturing significant territories.
- 2 December 2024 – Turkish Foreign Minister Fidan attributed the absence of dialogue with the opposition to Bashar al-Assad and stated that the recent attack was not the result of foreign interference.
- 6 December 2024 – Erdoğan stated that Assad failed to understand the value of the hand extended by Turkey.
- 7 December 2024 – CNN reported that U.S. officials believe Turkey gave the green light for Hay'at Tahrir al-Sham to launch its operation.

== Reactions ==
- Iran: On 13 January 2023, Iranian Foreign Minister Hossein Amir Abdollahian welcomed the improving relations between Syria and Turkey.
- Iraq: Iraq participated in the mediation of rapprochement between Ankara and Damascus to a large extent since April 2024.

== See also ==
- Adana Agreement
- Foreign policy of the Bashar al-Assad administration
- Foreign policy of the Recep Tayyip Erdoğan government
- Arab normalization with Syria
- Turkish occupation of northern Syria
- Turkish involvement in the Syrian civil war
