= Mowaffak Allaf =

Syrian diplomat (1927-1996)

His excellency Mowaffak Allaf موفق علاف

7th Permanent Representative of Syria to the United Nations
- In office 1975–1978
- Preceded by: Haissam Kelani
- Succeeded by: Hammud al-Shufi

Personal details
- Born: 17 May 1927 Damascus, Syria
- Died: 1996 (aged 68–69) Cairo, Egypt

Mowaffak Allaf (Arabic: موفق علاف; 1927–1996) was a Syrian diplomat, and a former ambassador to the United Nations. Allaf served as the Under-Secretary-General of the UN in Geneva, and headed the Syrian delegation to the Madrid peace conference and the subsequent peace talks with Israel.

Allaf held a diploma in international relations from the University of Damascus, and was awarded the "Decoration for Services to the Republic of Austria in Gold with Sash" by Austrian President Kurt Waldheim in February 1987.
