= Faisal Mekdad =

Syrian politician and diplomat (born 1954)

- فيصل المقداد
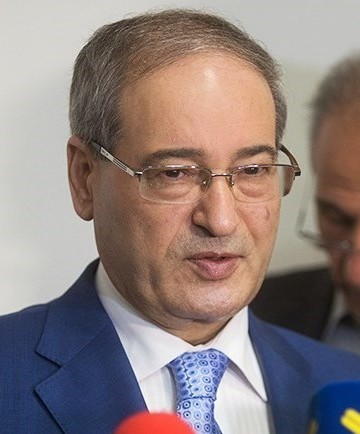
- Mekdad in 2017

Vice President of Syria
- In office 23 September 2024 – 8 December 2024 Serving with Najah al-Attar
- President: Bashar al-Assad
- Preceded by: Farouk al-Sharaa
- Succeeded by: Vacant

Minister of Foreign Affairs and Expatriates
- In office 22 November 2020 – 23 September 2024
- President: Bashar al-Assad
- Prime Minister: Hussein Arnous
- Preceded by: Walid Muallem
- Succeeded by: Bassam al-Sabbagh

Deputy Minister of Foreign Affairs
- In office 1 August 2006 – 22 November 2020
- President: Bashar al-Assad
- Preceded by: Walid Muallem
- Succeeded by: Bashar Jaafari

13th Permanent Representative of Syria to the United Nations
- In office 18 September 2003 – 31 July 2006
- President: Bashar al-Assad
- Preceded by: Mikhail Wehbe
- Succeeded by: Bashar Jaafari

Member of the Central Command of the Ba'ath Party
- In office 4 May 2024 – 8 December 2024

Personal details
- Born: 5 February 1954 (age 72) Ghasm, Daraa Governorate, Syria
- Party: Ba'ath Party
- Children: 3
- Education: Damascus University (BA); Charles University in Prague (PhD)
- Profession: Politician, Diplomat

Faisal Mekdad (Arabic: فيصل المقداد; born 5 February 1954) is a Syrian diplomat and politician who served as the last vice president of Ba'athist Syria from September until 8 December 2024. He previously served as Foreign Minister of Syria from 2020 to 2024 and as Syria's Permanent Representative to the United Nations from 2003 to 2006.

== Life and education ==
Faisal Mekdad was born in the village of Ghasm in Daraa Governorate in 1954. He graduated in 1978 from Damascus University with a degree in English. He was awarded a PhD in English Literature from Charles University in Prague in 1993. While at Charles University, he was a part of the International Union of Students. He was also a member of the executive office of Revolutionary Youth Union.

He was active in the Syrian student movement and student leadership at Damascus University, where he won first prize for his academic research on the history of the Asian student movement.

== Career ==
After graduating from Charles University, Mekdad joined the Syrian Foreign Ministry. In 1994, Mekdad moved to work in the diplomatic corps at the Ministry of Foreign Affairs as First Secretary in the Department of International Organizations and Conferences. In 1995, he was transferred to the Permanent Delegation of the Syrian Arab Republic to the United Nations, where he worked in various UN committees.

In 1996, he was appointed Deputy to the Permanent Representative of Syria to the United Nations under Mikhail Wehbe. In 2003, Mekdad became the Permanent Representative of Syria to the United Nations, a position he held until 2006, when he was appointed Deputy Foreign Minister. He was awarded the Order of Civil Merit by Juan Carlos I.

On 22 November 2020, following the death of Walid Muallem, Mekdad became the Minister of Foreign Affairs. Between 2023 and 2024, he participated in talks on Syrian–Turkish normalization. After 2023, he was also an integral part of the negotiations and meetings during the Syrian-Arab normalization and the restoration of Syria's full membership in the Arab League.

He was appointed as vice president for foreign and information policies on 23 September 2024. On 10 October 2024, Mekdad was sworn in before Bashar al-Assad.

=== Syrian civil war ===
Mekdad denied accusations of an alleged crackdown on protesters after the start of the Syrian civil war. In interviews with Western and Arab Media outlets about the uprising, he spoke in support of Bashar al-Assad.

He backed the government claim that his government was fighting armed terrorist insurgents. In 2013, when asked by a BBC reporter whether the government was winning the war, he responded, "We shall win it, we are winning it, yes." Mekdad was part of the delegation representing the Syrian government at the Geneva II Conference on Syria.

In January 2021, the European Union placed sanctions on Mekdad due to his involvement in the civil war. The United Kingdom followed two months later, stating that he "shares responsibility for the Syrian regime’s violent repression against the civilian population".

After the regime's fall, Mekdad issued a statement on 8 December praising Syrian youth and calling for dialogue, while pointedly avoiding any mention of Assad or accountability.

== Personal life ==
Faisal Mekdad is married and has one son and two daughters. Mekdad's father was kidnapped by gunmen on 18 May 2013 in his village of Ghasm.
