= 1998 United Nations Security Council election =

Election to the United Nations Security Council

- 8 October 1998

5 of 10 non-permanent seats on the United Nations Security Council
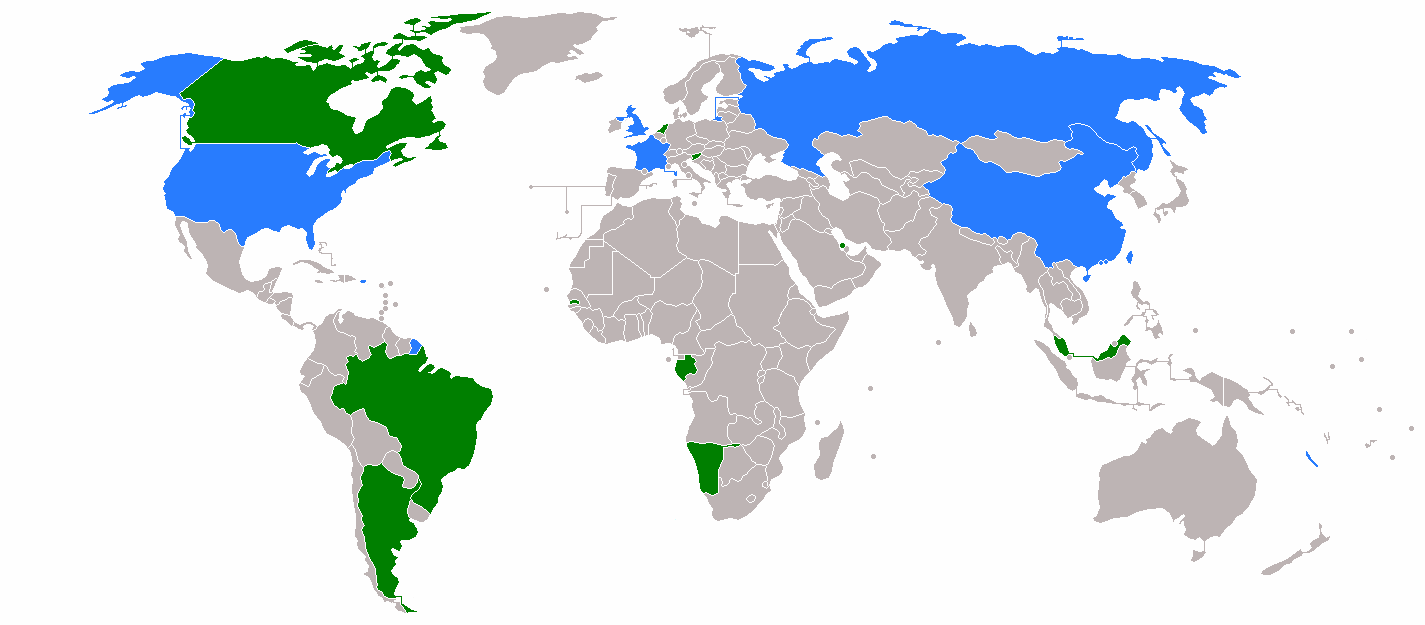
- United Nations Security Council membership after the election Permanent members Non-permanent members
- Outgoing members Kenya (Africa) Japan (Asia) Costa Rica (GRULAC) Portugal (WEOG) Sweden (WEOG) Elected members Namibia (Africa) Malaysia (Asia) Argentina (GRULAC) Canada (WEOG) Netherlands (WEOG)

- Unsuccessful candidate
- Greece (WEOG)

The 1998 United Nations Security Council election was held on 8 October 1998 at United Nations Headquarters in New York City during the 53rd session of the United Nations General Assembly. The General Assembly elected five non-permanent members of the UN Security Council for two-year terms commencing on 1 January 1999.

The five candidates elected were Argentina, Canada, Malaysia, Namibia (for the first time), and the Netherlands.

== Geographic distribution ==
In accordance with the General Assembly's rules for the geographic distribution of the non-permanent members of the Security Council, and established practice, the members were to be elected as follows: one from Africa, one from Asia, one from Latin American and the Caribbean Group (GRULAC), and two from the Western European and Others Group (WEOG).

== Candidates ==
There was a total of six candidates for the five seats. In the African, Asian, and Latin American and Caribbean Groups, there was one candidate per group: Namibia, Malaysia, and Argentina, respectively. In the Western European and Others Group, the three candidates for the two seats were Canada, Greece, and the Netherlands.

== Results ==
Voting proceeded by secret ballot. For each geographic group, each member state could vote for as many candidates as were to be elected. There were 176 ballots in each of the three elections.

=== Group A — African and Asian States (two to be elected) ===
- Malaysia 174
- Namibia 167
- Philippines 1
- Senegal 1
- Zimbabwe 1

=== Group B — Latin American and Caribbean States (one to be elected) ===
- Argentina 171
- Chile 1
- abstentions 4

=== Group C — Western European and Others Group (two to be elected) ===
- Canada 131
- Netherlands 122
- Greece 87
- abstentions 1

With Greece losing to Canada and the Netherlands, whom both acquired the requisite 2/3 majority, the final result was as follows: Argentina, Canada, Malaysia, Namibia, and the Netherlands were elected to the Security Council for two-year terms commencing 1 January 1999.

== See also ==
- List of members of the United Nations Security Council
- Canada and the United Nations
- European Union and the United Nations
