= Permanent Representative of Syria to the United Nations =

Ambassador and Permanent Representative of Syria to the United Nations السفير والممثل الدائم لسوريا لدى الأمم المتحدة
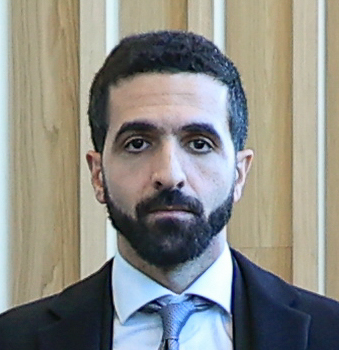
- Incumbent; Ibrahim Olabi since 19 August 2025
- Style: His Excellency
- Seat: New York, United States
- Appointer: President of Syria
- Inaugural holder: Fares al-Khoury
- Formation: 1946
- Website: Permanent Mission

The Permanent Representative of Syria to the United Nations is Syria's foremost diplomatic representative at the United Nations and the head of the Permanent Mission of the Syrian Arab Republic in New York City.

== List of heads of mission ==
The Permanent Representatives were the following:

- 1946–1948: Fares al-Khoury
- 1951–1953: Farid Zeineddine
- 1953–1957: Rafik Asha
- 1962–1964: Salah el-Dine Tarazi
- 1964–1965: Rafik Asha
- 1965–1972: George Tomeh
- 1972–1975: Haissam Kelani
- 1975–1978: Mowaffak Allaf
- 1978–1981: Hammud al-Shufi
- 1981–1986: Dia Allah El-Fattal
- 1988–1990: Ahmad Fathi Al-Masri
- 1990–1996: Dia Allah El-Fattal
- 1996–2003: Mikhail Wehbe
- 2003–2006: Faisal Mekdad
- 2006–2020: Bashar Jaafari
- 2020–2023: Bassam al-Sabbagh
- 2023–2025: Qusay al-Dahhak
- 2025–present: Ibrahim Olabi

== See also ==
- Foreign relations of Syria
- List of diplomatic missions of Syria
- Ministry of Foreign Affairs and Expatriates (Syria)
