= Ibrahim Olabi =

Syrian politician and diplomat

His Excellency Ibrahim Olabi
- إبراهيم علبي
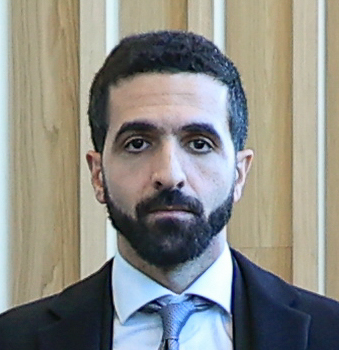

17th Permanent Representative of Syria to the United Nations
- Incumbent
- Assumed office 19 August 2025
- President: Ahmed al-Sharaa
- Preceded by: Qusay al-Dahhak

Personal details
- Born: May 1993 (age 33) Riyadh, Saudi Arabia
- Citizenship: Syria; United Kingdom; Germany
- Education: Oxford University
- Profession: Lawyer, Diplomat

Ibrahim Abdulmalik Olabi (Arabic: إبراهيم عبد الملك علبي) is a Syrian-British lawyer and diplomat who has held the position of Syria's Permanent Representative to the United Nations since August 2025.

== Career ==
Born in Riyadh, Saudi Arabia, Olabi pursued his legal studies in the United Kingdom. He studied law at the University of Manchester, earning a LLB (2011–2014) followed by an LLM in Security and International Law (2014–2015). He then completed the Bar Practice Training Course at the University of Law (2016–2018) and a Master of Public Policy at the University of Oxford (2021–2022).

In 2015, Olabi founded the Syrian Legal Development Programme (SLDP), an NGO that provides legal expertise to Syrian civil society organizations. The SLDP has received support from several governments, including those of Switzerland, Canada, Germany, and the Netherlands.

On August 19, 2025 Syrian President Ahmed al-Sharaa issued Decree No.142 appointing Olabi as Ambassador Extraordinary and Plenipotentiary and Permanent Representative of the Syrian Arab Republic to the United Nations in New York.

== Personal life ==
Olabi is fluent in Arabic and English, and proficient in German.
