= 1993 United Nations Security Council election =

Election to the United Nations Security Council

- 29 October 1993

5 of 10 non-permanent seats on the United Nations Security Council
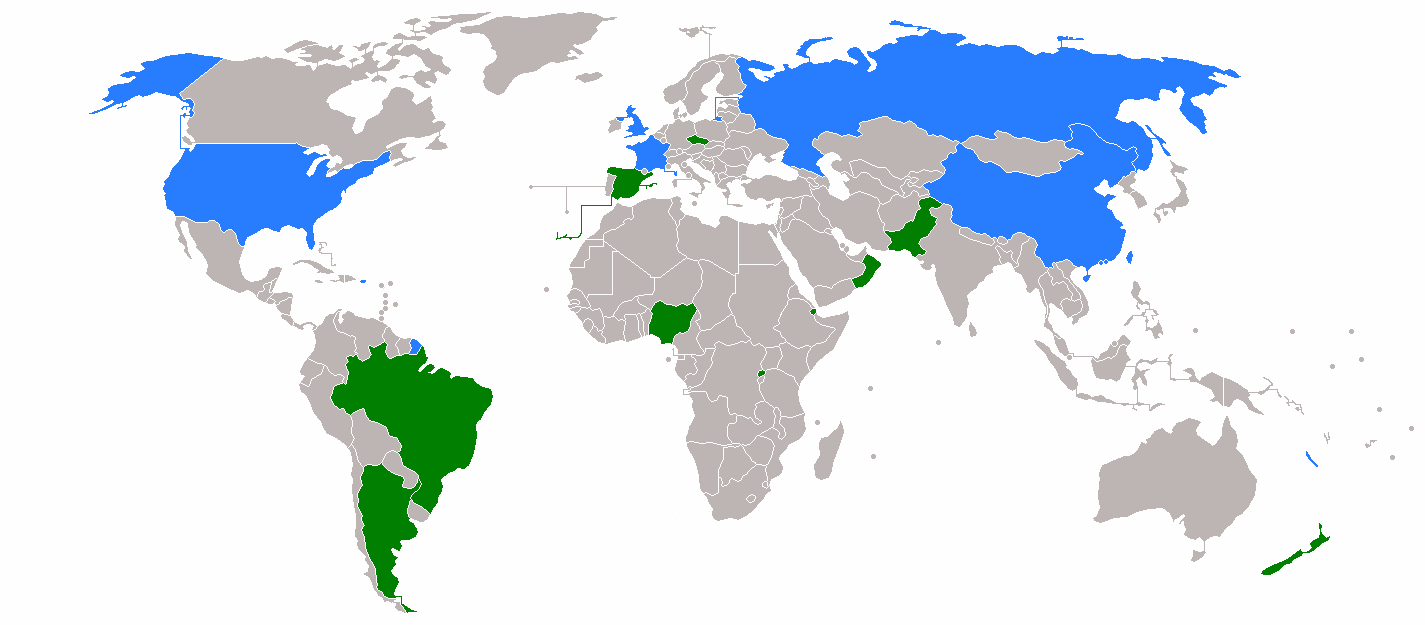
- United Nations Security Council membership after the election Permanent members Non-permanent members
- Outgoing members Cape Verde (Africa) Morocco (Africa)^{a} Japan (Asia) Venezuela (GRULAC) Hungary (EEG) a. Arab state Elected members Rwanda (Africa) Nigeria (Africa) Oman (Asia)^{a} Argentina (GRULAC) Czech Republic (EEG)

- Unsuccessful candidates
- Guinea-Bissau (Africa)
- Belarus (EEG)

The 1993 United Nations Security Council election was held on 29 October 1993 during the Forty-eighth session of the United Nations General Assembly, held at United Nations Headquarters in New York City. The General Assembly elected Argentina, the Czech Republic, Nigeria, Oman, and Rwanda, as the five new non-permanent members of the UN Security Council for two-year mandates commencing on 1 January 1994. Oman and Rwanda were elected for the first time ever, while the Czech Republic was elected for the first time as a separate country after the dissolution of Czechoslovakia.

== Rules ==
The Security Council has 15 seats, filled by five permanent members and ten non-permanent members. Each year, half of the non-permanent members are elected for two-year terms. A sitting member may not immediately run for re-election.

In accordance with the rules whereby the ten non-permanent UNSC seats rotate among the various regional blocs into which UN member states traditionally divide themselves for voting and representation purposes, the five available seats are allocated as follows:

- Two for African countries (held by Cape Verde and the Morocco)
- One for countries from the Asian Group (now the Asia-Pacific Group), for the "Arab swing seat" (held by Japan)
- One for Latin America and the Caribbean (held by Venezuela)
- One for the Eastern European Group (held by Hungary)

To be elected, a candidate must receive a two-thirds majority of those present and voting. If the vote is inconclusive after the first round, three rounds of restricted voting shall take place, followed by three rounds of unrestricted voting, and so on, until a result has been obtained. In restricted voting, only official candidates may be voted on, while in unrestricted voting, any member of the given regional group, with the exception of current Council members, may be voted on.

== Endorsed candidates ==
Prior to the election, the Chairmen of the respective Regional Groups conveyed to the General Assembly what nations they were endorsing as candidates for membership on the Security Council. Mr. Mumbengegwi of Zimbabwe gave the endorsement of the African Group to Rwanda from the central Africa region, but gave no endorsement to either Guinea-Bissau or Nigeria, both of which were stated to be candidates, and both from the west Africa region. Mr. Wisnumurti of Indonesia gave the endorsement of the Asian Group to Oman. Mr. Vorontsov, the then-Permanent Representative of Russia to the United Nations, gave word of the candidacies of both Belarus and the Czech Republic of the Eastern European Group. Mr. Remìrez de Estenoz of Cuba gave the endorsement of the Latin American and Caribbean Group to Argentina.

== Tribute to Melchior Ndadaye ==
Following the candidatures, and before the actual vote, at the initiative of Mr. Insanally of Guyana, the then-President of the General Assembly, a tribute to the freshly assassinated President of Burundi, Melchior Ndadaye, was held. This assassination would in time lead to the Burundi Civil War.

== Result ==
For the elections, 176 ballots were distributed in the first three rounds, while in the fourth round this was 162 ballots. There was a recess held between rounds three and four. Prior to the fourth round, Mr. Touré of Guinea-Bissau rose to speak. He claimed that only Rwanda and Guinea-Bissau were valid candidates of the African Group. He then withdrew his nation's candidacy "in a spirit of preserving the repute and higher interests of Africa". Mr. Gambari of Nigeria then claimed that both Guinea-Bissau and Nigeria were recognised as candidates by the Council of Ministers of the Organisation of African Unity. After hearing the two speakers, the General Assembly continued with the vote.

=== African Group ===
African and Asian States election results
Member	Round 1	Round 2	Round 3	Round 4
Oman	174	—	—	—
Rwanda	153	—	—	—
Nigeria	99	105	116	119
Guinea-Bissau	82	68	59	33
Burundi	2	—	—	—
abstentions	0	1	1	8
invalid ballots	0	2	0	0
required majority	118	116	117	102

=== Latin American and Caribbean Group ===
Latin American and Caribbean Group election results
Member	Round 1
Argentina	169
Honduras	1
invalid ballots	1
abstentions	5
required majority	114

=== Eastern European Group ===
Eastern European Group election results
Member	Round 1	Round 2
Czech Republic	113	127
Belarus	62	47
invalid ballots	0	1
abstentions	1	1
required majority	117	116

== See also ==
- List of members of the United Nations Security Council
