= 1986 United Nations Security Council election =

Election to the United Nations Security Council

- 16 October 1986

5 of 10 non-permanent seats on the United Nations Security Council
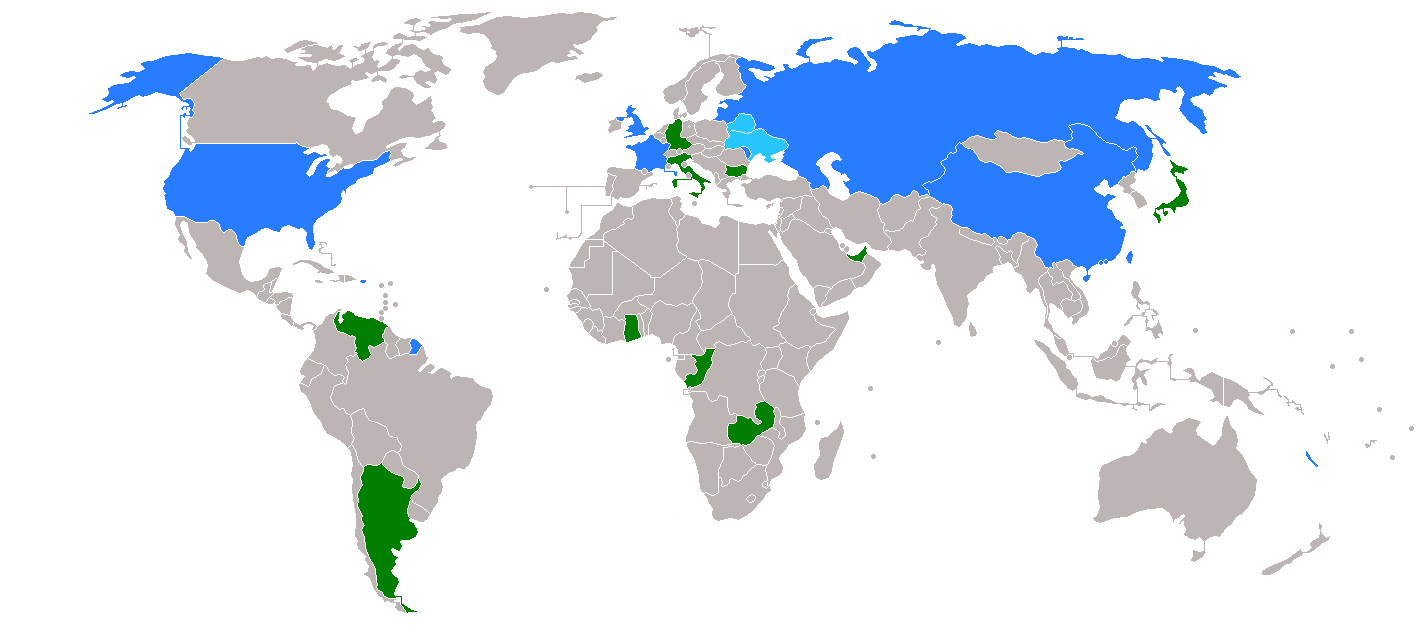
- United Nations Security Council membership after the election Permanent members Non-permanent members
- Outgoing members Madagascar (Africa) Thailand (Asia) Trinidad and Tobago (GRULAC) Australia (WEOG) Denmark (WEOG) Elected members Zambia (Africa) Japan (Asia) Argentina (GRULAC) Italy (WEOG) West Germany (WEOG)

- Unsuccessful candidates
- India (Asia)
- Ireland (WEOG)
- Sweden (WEOG)

The 1986 United Nations Security Council election was held on 16 October 1986 during the Forty-first session of the United Nations General Assembly, held at United Nations Headquarters in New York City. The General Assembly elected Argentina, Italy, Japan, West Germany, and Zambia, as the five new non-permanent members of the UN Security Council for two-year mandates commencing on 1 January 1987.

== Rules ==
The Security Council has 15 seats, filled by five permanent members and ten non-permanent members. Each year, half of the non-permanent members are elected for two-year terms. A sitting member may not immediately run for re-election.

In accordance with the rules whereby the ten non-permanent UNSC seats rotate among the various regional blocs into which UN member states traditionally divide themselves for voting and representation purposes, the five available seats are allocated as follows:

- One for African countries (held by Madagascar)
- One for countries from the Asian Group (now called the Asia-Pacific Group) (held by Japan)
- One for Latin America and the Caribbean (held by Trinidad and Tobago)
- Two for the Western European and Others Group (held by Australia and Denmark)

To be elected, a candidate must receive a two-thirds majority of those present and voting. If the vote is inconclusive after the first round, three rounds of restricted voting shall take place, followed by three rounds of unrestricted voting, and so on, until a result has been obtained. In restricted voting, only official candidates may be voted on, while in unrestricted voting, any member of the given regional group, with the exception of current Council members, may be voted on.

=== Endorsed candidates ===
Prior to the election, the Mexican delegate on behalf of the Latin American and Caribbean Group endorsed Argentina's candidacy, the West German delegate reiterated the Western European and Other Group's endorsement for Italy's candidacy as well as his country's, and the delegate of Senegal, speaking only for his own government, endorsed Zambia and clarified that his country's candidacy was for the following session.

== Result ==
Voting was conducted on a single ballot. Ballots containing more states from a certain region than seats allocated to that region were invalidated.

Member	Round 1
Zambia	154
Argentina	143
Italy	143
West Germany	111
Japan	107
India	36
Sweden	16
Ireland	14
Bolivia	3
Argentina	1
Belgium	1
Belize	1
Cuba	1
Finland	1
Greece	1
Lesotho	1
Malaysia	1
Mexico	1
Netherlands	1
Senegal	1
Sudan	1
abstentions	0
invalid ballots	0
required majority	103
ballot papers	154

== See also ==
- List of members of the United Nations Security Council
- Germany and the United Nations
- India and the United Nations
- Japan and the United Nations
