= Canada and the United Nations =

Canada

United Nations membership
- Membership: Full member
- Since: November 9, 1945
- UNSC seat: Non-permanent
- Permanent Representative: David Lametti

Canada was a founding member of the United Nations, and was an original signatory of the Declaration by United Nations. At the signing of the Declaration by United Nations, Canada was one of four Dominions of the British Commonwealth present, alongside Australia, New Zealand, and the Union of South Africa. In 1945, Canada was present at the United Nations Conference on International Organization and signed the Charter of the United Nations. McGill University professor John Peters Humphrey was the principal author of the first draft of the Universal Declaration of Human Rights.

Canada has served on the United Nations Security Council (UNSC) as a non-permanent member 8 times, with the most recent being in 2000. For its first 2 terms in the UNSC, Canada took the Commonwealth seat on the council, but in 1967, Canada has run for the Western European and Others Group seat. Canada is a member of Uniting for Consensus, a group that opposes the G4 nations' bids for permanent seats on the Security Council.

During the Suez Crisis, Canadian delegation to the United Nations was instrumental in the creation of the United Nations Emergency Force (UNEF) to end the situation. In 1957, then-Secretary of State for External Affairs Lester B. Pearson was awarded the Nobel Peace Prize for his role in the creation of the UNEF.

== History ==
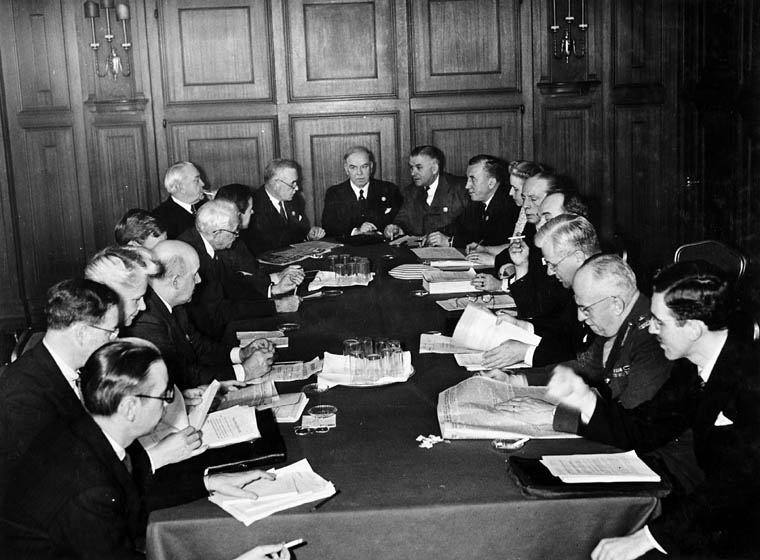
The Canadian Delegation to the United Nations Conference on International Organization, San Francisco, May 1945.

Canada was an original member of the United Nations, having previously served in the League of Nations prior to its dissolution. John Peters Humphrey established the Division for Human Rights in the UN Secretariat. Humphrey was also on the Drafting Committee of the International Bill of Rights. The Committee gave the Division for Human Rights the task of creating the first draft of the Bill of Rights, with Humphrey being the preliminary drafter of the document. Humphrey remained a champion of the Bill of Rights until its adoption by approval of the UN General Assembly in 1948.

In 1947, Canada played an important role in the United Nations Special Committee on Palestine (UNSCOP). Canada was one of the 33 countries that voted in favour of the 1947 UN partition resolution, which led to the establishment of the State of Israel despite heavy pressure from the United Kingdom on the Commonwealth of Nations.

Secretary of State for External Affairs Lester B. Pearson, having served as UN General Assembly President in 1952/53, proposed the concept of UN peacekeeping forces as a means of dealing with the Suez Crisis. He was awarded a Nobel Peace Prize for his efforts and the establishment of the United Nations Emergency Force (UNEF).

Canada ratified the Universal Declaration of Human Rights in 1948, and seven principal UN human rights conventions and covenants since then:

- International Convention on the Elimination of All Forms of Racial Discrimination (accession by Canada in 1970)
- International Covenant on Civil and Political Rights (accession by Canada in 1976)
- International Covenant on Economic, Social and Cultural Rights (ratified by Canada in 1976)
- Convention on the Elimination of All Forms of Discrimination against Women (ratified by Canada in 1981)
- Convention against Torture and Other Cruel, Inhuman or Degrading Treatment or Punishment (ratified by Canada in 1987)
- Convention on the Rights of the Child (ratified by Canada in 1991)
- Convention on the Rights of Persons with Disabilities (ratified by Canada in 2010)

== Actions as a UN Member State ==
=== Peacekeeping ===
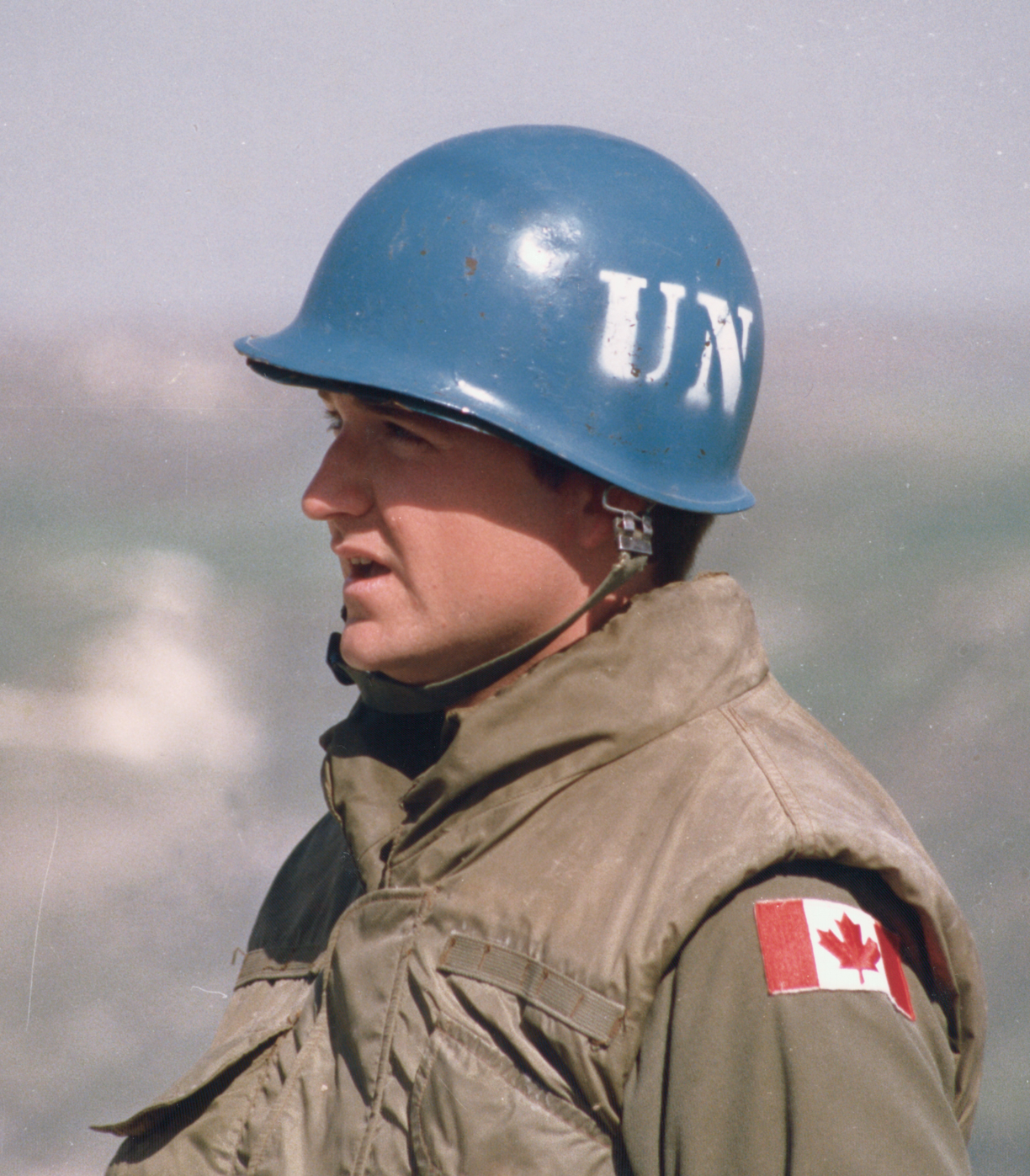
Canadian peacekeeper in 1976 wearing the distinctive flag of Canada and UN blue helmet

Canada has served in over 50 peacekeeping missions, including every United Nations (UN) peacekeeping effort from its inception until 1989. More than 125,000 Canadians have served in international peacekeeping operations, with approximately 130 Canadians having died during these operations. Canada's support for multilateralism and internationalism has been closely related to its peacekeeping efforts. Canada actively promotes its domestically shared values through its foreign affairs engagements.

Canada's role in the development of and participation in peacekeeping during the 20th century led to its reputation as a positive middle power. Canada's successful role in mediating the 1956 Suez Canal Crisis gave it credibility and established it as a country fighting for the common good of all nations. The Canadian public came to identify the nation's peacekeeping role as the country's top contribution in international affairs.

Canada faced controversy over its involvement in some peacekeeping efforts resulting in a military reassessment in the late 1990s. By the 21st century, Canadian direct participation in UN peacekeeping efforts greatly declined, with its military participation reallocated to UN-sanctioned operations through the North Atlantic Treaty Organization (NATO). This military reallocation resulted in a shift towards more militarized and deadly missions, rather than traditional peacekeeping duties.

== Canada and the Security Council ==
Canada has served in the UNSC for 12 years, thus ranking in the top ten of non-permanent members. As of 2015, it shares the fourth place in the list of non-permanent members serving on the Council by length with Italy. This places Canada behind Brazil and Japan (first place), Argentina (second place), and Colombia, India, and Pakistan (third place). Canada was elected for the following six terms: 1948–49, 1958–59, 1967–68, 1977–78, 1989–90, and 1999–2000 - once every decade. It lost its bid for a seat in the 2010 Security Council elections, to Germany and Portugal, and in the 2020 Security Council elections, to Ireland and Norway.

== National Film Board of Canada ==
The National Film Board of Canada (NFB), Canada's state film producer, has produced several works about or on behalf of the U.N. The first, the 1944 short film U.N.R.R.A. presents In the Wake of the Armies ... focused the work of the United Nations Relief and Rehabilitation Administration. The 1945 film Now — The Peace, on the formation of the U.N. at the Dumbarton Oaks Conference, was produced by the NFB at the suggestion of Archibald MacLeish, then-Assistant Secretary of State for Public Affairs for the U.S. government.

== Proposed headquarters site(s) ==
A site on Navy Island which straddles the U.S.-Canada border was considered as potential site for the UN Headquarters. As well as a subsequent proposals following the Iraq invasion to relocate to Montreal in the Canadian province of Quebec.

== See also ==
- Permanent Representative of Canada to the United Nations
- United Nations Association in Canada
- List of Canadian peacekeeping missions
