= List of countries by life expectancy =

Life expectancy at birth

Life expectancy versus health expenditure

Yearly healthcare expenditure per person (total public and private)

This list of countries and territories by life expectancy provides a comprehensive list of countries alongside their respective life expectancy figures. The data are differentiated by sex, presenting life expectancies for males, females, and a combined average. In addition to sovereign nations, the list encompasses several non-sovereign entities and territories. The figures serve as an indicator of the quality of healthcare in the respective countries and are influenced by various factors, including the prevalence of diseases such as HIV/AIDS.

This article introduces the concept of Healthy life expectancy (HALE), which denotes the average number of years a person is expected to live in "full health". There are challenges in comparing life expectancies across countries due to disparities in data reporting and collection standards. The primary source of the most recent data presented is the World Bank Group's 2022 report.

== Methodology ==
The life expectancy is shown separately for males and for females, as well as a combined figure. Several non-sovereign entities and territories are also included in this list.

The figures reflect the quality of healthcare in the countries listed, as well as other factors including HIV infections.

From the start of the 21st century, estimates of healthy life expectancy (HALE), the average number of years that a person can expect to live in "full health", are also produced.

Comparing life expectancies across countries can be difficult, due to poor reporting in some countries and different local standards in collecting statistics. This is especially true for healthy life expectancy, the definition of which may change over time, even within a country.

== United Nations (2023) ==
Estimations are by the United Nations Department of Economic and Social Affairs. Only countries with populations over 50,000 are listed. Due to this criterion, the table does not include such countries as Monaco (LE 86.37 years, population 39,000), San Marino (LE 85.71 years, population 34,000), and Saint Barthélemy (LE 84.29 years, population 11,000). The values are rounded. All calculations were made with raw data.

These values are used to calculate the Human Development Index.

=== UN: Estimate of life expectancy for various ages in 2023 ===
Location links in this table are "Demographics by LOCATION" links.

UN: Life expectancy overall, by gender, and for various ages in 2023. Also: Sex gap (difference in life expectancy for female and male)
| Locations | Life expectancy overall | | | | | | | Male | | | | Female | | | | Sex gap | | | | |
| Locations | at birth | bonus 0→15 | at 15 | bonus 15→65 | at 65 | bonus 65→80 | at 80 | at birth | at 15 | at 65 | at 80 | at birth | at 15 | at 65 | at 80 | at birth | at 15 | at 65 | at 80 | |
|---|---|---|---|---|---|---|---|---|---|---|---|---|---|---|---|---|---|---|---|---|
| Hong Kong | 85.51 | 0.21 | 70.72 | 2.47 | 23.19 | 3.27 | 11.45 | 82.84 | 68.06 | 21.21 | 10.26 | 88.13 | 73.33 | 25.21 | 12.54 | 5.29 | 5.27 | 4.00 | 2.27 | (Hong Kong) |
| Japan | 84.71 | 0.24 | 69.96 | 2.54 | 22.49 | 3.45 | 10.95 | 81.69 | 66.93 | 19.98 | 9.27 | 87.74 | 72.98 | 24.85 | 12.20 | 6.05 | 6.05 | 4.87 | 2.93 | (Japan) |
| South Korea | 84.33 | 0.30 | 69.63 | 1.69 | 21.32 | 4.14 | 10.45 | 81.19 | 66.51 | 18.63 | 8.40 | 87.16 | 72.44 | 23.55 | 11.68 | 5.96 | 5.93 | 4.92 | 3.27 | (South Korea) |
| French Polynesia | 84.07 | 0.58 | 69.65 | 1.85 | 21.50 | 3.72 | 10.23 | 81.78 | 67.37 | 19.58 | 8.88 | 86.50 | 72.07 | 23.48 | 11.37 | 4.73 | 4.70 | 3.90 | 2.48 | (French Polynesia) |
| Andorra | 84.04 | 0.58 | 69.62 | 1.85 | 21.47 | 3.72 | 10.19 | 82.10 | 67.68 | 19.81 | 9.03 | 86.11 | 71.70 | 23.18 | 11.16 | 4.01 | 4.02 | 3.36 | 2.13 | (Andorra) |
| Switzerland | 83.95 | 0.36 | 69.31 | 2.20 | 21.51 | 3.46 | 9.97 | 82.01 | 67.38 | 20.05 | 9.08 | 85.83 | 71.17 | 22.83 | 10.63 | 3.82 | 3.80 | 2.78 | 1.54 | (Switzerland) |
| Australia | 83.92 | 0.35 | 69.27 | 2.38 | 21.65 | 3.35 | 10.00 | 82.10 | 67.45 | 20.32 | 9.14 | 85.74 | 71.08 | 22.93 | 10.74 | 3.64 | 3.62 | 2.62 | 1.60 | (Australia) |
| Singapore | 83.74 | 0.27 | 69.00 | 2.87 | 21.87 | 3.87 | 10.74 | 81.24 | 66.51 | 20.03 | 9.66 | 86.24 | 71.50 | 23.53 | 11.50 | 5.00 | 4.99 | 3.50 | 1.84 | (Singapore) |
| Italy | 83.72 | 0.26 | 68.98 | 2.33 | 21.31 | 3.46 | 9.77 | 81.57 | 66.84 | 19.67 | 8.77 | 85.75 | 70.99 | 22.76 | 10.50 | 4.18 | 4.15 | 3.09 | 1.73 | (Italy) |
| Spain | 83.67 | 0.29 | 68.96 | 2.58 | 21.54 | 3.57 | 10.11 | 80.96 | 66.26 | 19.48 | 8.96 | 86.31 | 71.58 | 23.40 | 10.94 | 5.35 | 5.32 | 3.92 | 1.98 | (Spain) |
| Réunion | 83.55 | 0.60 | 69.14 | 3.10 | 22.24 | 3.67 | 10.91 | 80.53 | 66.16 | 20.37 | 9.88 | 86.33 | 71.89 | 23.83 | 11.60 | 5.80 | 5.73 | 3.46 | 1.72 | (Réunion) |
| France | 83.33 | 0.39 | 68.72 | 3.31 | 22.03 | 3.58 | 10.61 | 80.43 | 65.85 | 20.00 | 9.41 | 86.09 | 71.44 | 23.78 | 11.45 | 5.66 | 5.59 | 3.78 | 2.04 | (France) |
| Norway | 83.31 | 0.25 | 68.56 | 2.19 | 20.75 | 3.53 | 9.28 | 81.75 | 67.02 | 19.58 | 8.37 | 84.85 | 70.07 | 21.84 | 10.02 | 3.10 | 3.05 | 2.27 | 1.65 | (Norway) |
| Malta | 83.30 | 0.78 | 69.08 | 2.35 | 21.42 | 3.98 | 10.41 | 81.27 | 66.86 | 19.36 | 8.83 | 85.26 | 71.26 | 23.35 | 11.61 | 3.99 | 4.40 | 3.98 | 2.79 | (Malta) |
| Guernsey | 83.27 | 0.64 | 68.91 | 2.00 | 20.91 | 3.91 | 9.82 | 81.01 | 66.65 | 19.03 | 8.55 | 85.58 | 71.20 | 22.77 | 10.88 | 4.56 | 4.55 | 3.75 | 2.33 | (Guernsey) |
| Sweden | 83.26 | 0.24 | 68.50 | 2.42 | 20.92 | 3.71 | 9.63 | 81.44 | 66.69 | 19.55 | 8.69 | 85.10 | 70.33 | 22.23 | 10.40 | 3.66 | 3.64 | 2.69 | 1.71 | (Sweden) |
| Macau | 83.08 | 0.29 | 68.37 | 2.33 | 20.70 | 3.05 | 8.75 | 80.83 | 66.22 | 19.24 | 7.92 | 85.25 | 70.43 | 22.19 | 9.47 | 4.42 | 4.21 | 2.95 | 1.55 | (Macau) |
| United Arab Emirates | 82.91 | 0.54 | 68.45 | 1.57 | 20.01 | 3.21 | 8.23 | 81.98 | 67.56 | 19.39 | 7.64 | 84.20 | 69.70 | 20.72 | 8.86 | 2.23 | 2.14 | 1.33 | 1.22 | (United Arab Emirates) |
| Iceland | 82.69 | 0.16 | 67.85 | 2.92 | 20.77 | 3.52 | 9.29 | 80.98 | 66.22 | 19.82 | 8.72 | 84.51 | 69.57 | 21.73 | 9.80 | 3.52 | 3.35 | 1.91 | 1.08 | (Iceland) |
| Canada | 82.63 | 0.46 | 68.09 | 3.39 | 21.48 | 3.84 | 10.32 | 80.43 | 65.92 | 20.03 | 9.36 | 84.83 | 70.25 | 22.81 | 11.08 | 4.40 | 4.33 | 2.77 | 1.72 | (Canada) |
| Martinique | 82.56 | 0.84 | 68.41 | 3.07 | 21.47 | 4.07 | 10.54 | 79.25 | 65.14 | 19.30 | 9.44 | 85.62 | 71.41 | 23.43 | 11.36 | 6.36 | 6.28 | 4.14 | 1.92 | (Martinique) |
| Israel | 82.41 | 0.40 | 67.81 | 3.05 | 20.86 | 3.87 | 9.73 | 80.18 | 65.62 | 19.65 | 9.22 | 84.59 | 69.95 | 21.93 | 10.12 | 4.41 | 4.33 | 2.28 | 0.89 | (Israel) |
| Ireland | 82.41 | 0.31 | 67.72 | 2.77 | 20.49 | 3.91 | 9.41 | 80.37 | 65.71 | 19.06 | 8.45 | 84.48 | 69.76 | 21.88 | 10.20 | 4.11 | 4.04 | 2.82 | 1.76 | (Republic of Ireland) |
| Qatar | 82.37 | 0.51 | 67.88 | 1.73 | 19.61 | 3.96 | 8.57 | 81.61 | 67.17 | 18.94 | 7.96 | 83.37 | 68.83 | 20.43 | 9.31 | 1.76 | 1.67 | 1.49 | 1.35 | (Qatar) |
| Portugal | 82.36 | 0.32 | 67.68 | 3.20 | 20.88 | 3.73 | 9.61 | 79.44 | 64.77 | 18.97 | 8.63 | 85.12 | 70.41 | 22.52 | 10.29 | 5.68 | 5.64 | 3.55 | 1.66 | (Portugal) |
| Bermuda | 82.31 | 0.26 | 67.56 | 3.25 | 20.81 | 4.01 | 9.82 | 78.86 | 64.18 | 18.01 | 8.02 | 85.74 | 70.92 | 23.36 | 11.12 | 6.89 | 6.73 | 5.36 | 3.10 | (Bermuda) |
| Luxembourg | 82.23 | 0.81 | 68.03 | 2.93 | 20.96 | 3.67 | 9.63 | 80.57 | 66.17 | 19.39 | 8.65 | 83.84 | 69.86 | 22.39 | 10.33 | 3.27 | 3.68 | 3.00 | 1.68 | (Luxembourg) |
| Netherlands | 82.16 | 0.37 | 67.53 | 2.58 | 20.11 | 3.83 | 8.94 | 80.54 | 65.93 | 18.82 | 8.05 | 83.74 | 69.08 | 21.30 | 9.64 | 3.20 | 3.15 | 2.48 | 1.59 | (Netherlands) |
| Belgium | 82.11 | 0.37 | 67.48 | 3.01 | 20.50 | 4.15 | 9.65 | 79.86 | 65.25 | 18.83 | 8.66 | 84.33 | 69.67 | 22.01 | 10.37 | 4.47 | 4.41 | 3.19 | 1.71 | (Belgium) |
| New Zealand | 82.09 | 0.54 | 67.63 | 3.15 | 20.77 | 3.64 | 9.42 | 80.41 | 65.97 | 19.72 | 8.86 | 83.77 | 69.29 | 21.79 | 9.89 | 3.36 | 3.32 | 2.06 | 1.03 | (New Zealand) |
| Guadeloupe | 82.05 | 0.80 | 67.85 | 4.10 | 21.95 | 4.17 | 11.11 | 78.13 | 64.05 | 19.50 | 9.28 | 85.53 | 71.18 | 23.97 | 12.36 | 7.40 | 7.13 | 4.47 | 3.08 | (Guadeloupe) |
| Austria | 81.96 | 0.34 | 67.29 | 2.83 | 20.12 | 4.17 | 9.29 | 79.54 | 64.91 | 18.45 | 8.34 | 84.32 | 69.62 | 21.61 | 9.98 | 4.78 | 4.71 | 3.16 | 1.64 | (Austria) |
| Denmark | 81.93 | 0.33 | 67.26 | 2.59 | 19.85 | 4.20 | 9.06 | 80.02 | 65.36 | 18.39 | 8.13 | 83.86 | 69.17 | 21.25 | 9.80 | 3.84 | 3.80 | 2.85 | 1.68 | (Denmark) |
| Finland | 81.91 | 0.28 | 67.19 | 3.13 | 20.32 | 3.92 | 9.24 | 79.17 | 64.45 | 18.36 | 8.07 | 84.67 | 69.93 | 22.11 | 10.09 | 5.50 | 5.48 | 3.75 | 2.02 | (Finland) |
| Greece | 81.86 | 0.35 | 67.20 | 2.71 | 19.92 | 4.62 | 9.53 | 79.29 | 64.65 | 18.24 | 8.64 | 84.33 | 69.66 | 21.41 | 10.19 | 5.04 | 5.00 | 3.16 | 1.55 | (Greece) |
| Puerto Rico | 81.69 | 0.55 | 67.24 | 3.63 | 20.88 | 4.63 | 10.51 | 78.03 | 63.59 | 18.61 | 9.24 | 85.24 | 70.79 | 22.92 | 11.52 | 7.21 | 7.19 | 4.31 | 2.27 | (Puerto Rico) |
| Cyprus | 81.65 | 0.33 | 66.97 | 2.16 | 19.14 | 4.48 | 8.62 | 79.64 | 64.98 | 17.64 | 7.76 | 83.67 | 68.97 | 20.57 | 9.28 | 4.03 | 3.99 | 2.93 | 1.51 | (Cyprus) |
| Slovenia | 81.60 | 0.24 | 66.85 | 2.93 | 19.78 | 4.43 | 9.21 | 78.90 | 64.17 | 17.87 | 8.18 | 84.34 | 69.54 | 21.47 | 9.86 | 5.44 | 5.37 | 3.59 | 1.67 | (Slovenia) |
| Germany | 81.38 | 0.34 | 66.72 | 3.10 | 19.82 | 4.24 | 9.06 | 79.02 | 64.38 | 18.18 | 8.24 | 83.76 | 69.07 | 21.33 | 9.66 | 4.74 | 4.69 | 3.16 | 1.42 | (Germany) |
| United Kingdom | 81.30 | 0.40 | 66.70 | 3.50 | 20.19 | 4.11 | 9.30 | 79.36 | 64.79 | 18.95 | 8.58 | 83.21 | 68.57 | 21.34 | 9.88 | 3.85 | 3.78 | 2.40 | 1.30 | (United Kingdom) |
| Bahrain | 81.28 | 0.66 | 66.94 | 2.61 | 19.55 | 4.46 | 9.01 | 80.67 | 66.39 | 19.10 | 8.50 | 81.99 | 67.59 | 20.04 | 9.54 | 1.31 | 1.20 | 0.94 | 1.04 | (Bahrain) |
| Chile | 81.17 | 0.52 | 66.68 | 3.91 | 20.59 | 4.52 | 10.11 | 79.24 | 64.79 | 19.59 | 9.66 | 83.08 | 68.56 | 21.49 | 10.46 | 3.84 | 3.77 | 1.89 | 0.81 | (Chile) |
| Maldives | 81.04 | 0.47 | 66.51 | 1.94 | 18.46 | 4.47 | 7.92 | 79.69 | 65.19 | 17.38 | 7.31 | 82.82 | 68.27 | 19.82 | 8.65 | 3.13 | 3.08 | 2.44 | 1.34 | (Maldives) |
| Isle of Man | 81.00 | 1.31 | 67.31 | 3.25 | 20.56 | 4.21 | 9.78 | 78.93 | 65.29 | 19.16 | 8.84 | 83.13 | 69.38 | 21.93 | 10.55 | 4.21 | 4.08 | 2.77 | 1.71 | (Isle of Man) |
| Costa Rica | 80.80 | 0.73 | 66.53 | 4.21 | 20.74 | 4.07 | 9.81 | 78.13 | 63.89 | 19.21 | 8.75 | 83.42 | 69.11 | 22.09 | 10.60 | 5.29 | 5.23 | 2.88 | 1.84 | (Costa Rica) |
| Taiwan | 80.56 | 0.40 | 65.96 | 4.22 | 20.18 | 3.90 | 9.08 | 77.63 | 63.04 | 18.50 | 8.18 | 83.61 | 68.99 | 21.77 | 9.82 | 5.98 | 5.96 | 3.27 | 1.65 | (Taiwan) |
| Kuwait | 80.41 | 0.82 | 66.22 | 2.13 | 18.35 | 4.05 | 7.40 | 79.25 | 65.13 | 17.63 | 6.83 | 81.85 | 67.60 | 19.06 | 7.95 | 2.59 | 2.47 | 1.43 | 1.12 | (Kuwait) |
| Cayman Islands | 80.36 | 0.22 | 65.58 | 5.05 | 20.64 | 4.19 | 9.82 | 77.98 | 63.18 | 18.76 | 8.69 | 82.87 | 68.11 | 22.51 | 10.79 | 4.89 | 4.93 | 3.75 | 2.11 | (Cayman Islands) |
| Faroe Islands | 80.18 | 0.68 | 65.86 | 2.40 | 18.26 | 4.65 | 7.91 | 78.17 | 63.96 | 16.83 | 7.12 | 82.50 | 68.06 | 19.86 | 8.64 | 4.33 | 4.10 | 3.03 | 1.52 | (Faroe Islands) |
| Oman | 80.03 | 1.01 | 66.04 | 2.48 | 18.53 | 4.63 | 8.16 | 78.49 | 64.58 | 17.35 | 7.47 | 81.88 | 67.82 | 19.72 | 8.77 | 3.39 | 3.24 | 2.37 | 1.30 | (Oman) |
| Czech Republic | 79.83 | 0.28 | 65.11 | 3.54 | 18.66 | 4.81 | 8.47 | 77.00 | 62.29 | 16.71 | 7.56 | 82.64 | 67.90 | 20.32 | 9.03 | 5.64 | 5.60 | 3.61 | 1.47 | (Czech Republic) |
| Jersey | 79.71 | 0.91 | 65.61 | 2.81 | 18.43 | 4.81 | 8.23 | 77.72 | 63.60 | 16.80 | 7.25 | 81.76 | 67.69 | 20.04 | 9.06 | 4.04 | 4.09 | 3.24 | 1.81 | (Jersey) |
| Albania | 79.60 | 0.89 | 65.49 | 3.27 | 18.76 | 4.48 | 8.24 | 77.73 | 63.64 | 17.87 | 7.76 | 81.45 | 67.31 | 19.61 | 8.67 | 3.72 | 3.67 | 1.74 | 0.91 | (Albania) |
| Panama | 79.59 | 1.49 | 66.09 | 4.49 | 20.58 | 4.49 | 10.06 | 76.65 | 63.23 | 18.64 | 8.89 | 82.56 | 68.95 | 22.35 | 10.94 | 5.90 | 5.72 | 3.71 | 2.05 | (Panama) |
| United States | 79.30 | 0.57 | 64.88 | 5.12 | 20.00 | 4.61 | 9.61 | 76.86 | 62.47 | 18.67 | 8.87 | 81.85 | 67.38 | 21.22 | 10.17 | 4.99 | 4.91 | 2.55 | 1.30 | (United States) |
| Estonia | 79.15 | 0.26 | 64.41 | 4.39 | 18.80 | 5.21 | 9.02 | 74.90 | 60.21 | 15.85 | 7.77 | 83.04 | 68.23 | 20.90 | 9.55 | 8.14 | 8.03 | 5.05 | 1.78 | (Estonia) |
| New Caledonia | 78.77 | 1.02 | 64.78 | 4.35 | 19.14 | 3.50 | 7.64 | 76.28 | 62.40 | 17.93 | 6.94 | 81.29 | 67.18 | 20.27 | 8.17 | 5.01 | 4.78 | 2.34 | 1.23 | (New Caledonia) |
| Saudi Arabia | 78.73 | 0.67 | 64.41 | 3.80 | 18.21 | 4.93 | 8.13 | 77.10 | 62.81 | 17.18 | 7.49 | 81.16 | 66.80 | 19.51 | 8.78 | 4.06 | 3.99 | 2.33 | 1.29 | (Saudi Arabia) |
| Poland | 78.63 | 0.35 | 63.98 | 4.71 | 18.70 | 5.36 | 9.06 | 74.88 | 60.23 | 16.43 | 8.05 | 82.35 | 67.70 | 20.52 | 9.60 | 7.48 | 7.47 | 4.09 | 1.55 | (Poland) |
| Croatia | 78.58 | 0.37 | 63.95 | 3.63 | 17.58 | 5.10 | 7.68 | 75.41 | 60.78 | 15.45 | 6.46 | 81.69 | 67.05 | 19.39 | 8.42 | 6.28 | 6.27 | 3.94 | 1.96 | (Croatia) |
| Slovakia | 78.34 | 0.51 | 63.85 | 4.31 | 18.16 | 5.27 | 8.43 | 75.02 | 60.56 | 16.06 | 7.70 | 81.58 | 67.06 | 19.83 | 8.81 | 6.56 | 6.50 | 3.77 | 1.11 | (Slovakia) |
| Uruguay | 78.14 | 0.61 | 63.75 | 5.19 | 18.94 | 5.90 | 9.84 | 74.19 | 59.82 | 16.02 | 7.72 | 81.92 | 67.51 | 21.31 | 11.06 | 7.73 | 7.69 | 5.29 | 3.34 | (Uruguay) |
| Cuba | 78.08 | 0.57 | 63.66 | 4.57 | 18.23 | 5.90 | 9.13 | 75.67 | 61.30 | 16.74 | 8.41 | 80.52 | 66.02 | 19.60 | 9.70 | 4.85 | 4.71 | 2.87 | 1.29 | (Cuba) |
| Kosovo | 78.03 | 0.78 | 63.81 | 3.13 | 16.94 | 5.38 | 7.32 | 75.80 | 61.62 | 15.45 | 6.61 | 80.12 | 65.85 | 18.24 | 7.82 | 4.31 | 4.22 | 2.79 | 1.22 | |
| China | 77.95 | 0.73 | 63.69 | 3.77 | 17.45 | 5.06 | 7.52 | 75.20 | 60.97 | 15.55 | 6.45 | 80.93 | 66.61 | 19.34 | 8.40 | 5.72 | 5.64 | 3.79 | 1.95 | (China) |
| Bosnia and Herzegovina | 77.85 | 0.48 | 63.33 | 4.05 | 17.38 | 5.91 | 8.29 | 74.42 | 59.93 | 14.83 | 6.32 | 80.90 | 66.35 | 19.27 | 9.27 | 6.48 | 6.42 | 4.44 | 2.95 | (Bosnia and Herzegovina) |
| Lebanon | 77.82 | 1.59 | 64.41 | 3.23 | 17.64 | 5.17 | 7.81 | 75.74 | 62.40 | 16.09 | 6.86 | 79.73 | 66.25 | 18.98 | 8.40 | 3.99 | 3.85 | 2.89 | 1.53 | (Lebanon) |
| Jordan | 77.81 | 1.21 | 64.02 | 3.31 | 17.32 | 5.31 | 7.64 | 75.71 | 61.99 | 15.73 | 6.67 | 80.19 | 66.32 | 19.01 | 8.42 | 4.48 | 4.33 | 3.28 | 1.75 | (Jordan) |
| Peru | 77.74 | 1.38 | 64.11 | 5.42 | 19.54 | 5.19 | 9.73 | 75.41 | 61.88 | 18.12 | 8.60 | 80.12 | 66.40 | 20.90 | 10.72 | 4.71 | 4.52 | 2.78 | 2.12 | (Peru) |
| Colombia | 77.72 | 1.13 | 63.85 | 4.53 | 18.38 | 4.43 | 7.80 | 74.95 | 61.15 | 16.86 | 6.79 | 80.45 | 66.49 | 19.70 | 8.53 | 5.50 | 5.34 | 2.84 | 1.75 | (Colombia) |
| Iran | 77.65 | 1.17 | 63.83 | 3.76 | 17.59 | 4.39 | 6.98 | 75.79 | 61.99 | 16.79 | 6.43 | 79.63 | 65.76 | 18.36 | 7.42 | 3.84 | 3.76 | 1.57 | 1.00 | (Iran) |
| Antigua and Barbuda | 77.60 | 0.86 | 63.46 | 4.94 | 18.41 | 5.37 | 8.78 | 74.55 | 60.42 | 16.01 | 7.02 | 80.29 | 66.14 | 20.33 | 9.88 | 5.75 | 5.71 | 4.32 | 2.86 | (Antigua and Barbuda) |
| Sri Lanka | 77.48 | 0.57 | 63.05 | 3.96 | 17.01 | 5.60 | 7.62 | 74.24 | 59.86 | 15.00 | 6.77 | 80.59 | 66.11 | 18.71 | 8.16 | 6.35 | 6.26 | 3.71 | 1.39 | (Sri Lanka) |
| Argentina | 77.39 | 0.93 | 63.32 | 4.79 | 18.11 | 5.65 | 8.76 | 74.81 | 60.76 | 16.20 | 7.66 | 79.88 | 65.77 | 19.72 | 9.44 | 5.07 | 5.01 | 3.51 | 1.78 | (Argentina) |
| North Macedonia | 77.39 | 0.53 | 62.92 | 3.58 | 16.50 | 5.68 | 7.18 | 75.11 | 60.67 | 15.01 | 6.26 | 79.57 | 65.05 | 17.74 | 7.75 | 4.46 | 4.38 | 2.74 | 1.49 | (North Macedonia) |
| Ecuador | 77.39 | 1.12 | 63.51 | 5.24 | 18.75 | 4.58 | 8.34 | 74.66 | 60.86 | 17.25 | 7.32 | 80.14 | 66.17 | 20.10 | 9.09 | 5.47 | 5.32 | 2.86 | 1.77 | (Ecuador) |
| Guam | 77.21 | 1.14 | 63.35 | 6.95 | 20.29 | 5.63 | 10.92 | 73.44 | 59.62 | 18.10 | 9.42 | 81.42 | 67.50 | 22.44 | 12.16 | 7.98 | 7.88 | 4.33 | 2.74 | (Guam) |
| Turkey | 77.16 | 1.36 | 63.52 | 4.06 | 17.58 | 5.18 | 7.75 | 74.53 | 60.85 | 15.57 | 6.41 | 79.86 | 66.26 | 19.46 | 8.78 | 5.33 | 5.40 | 3.89 | 2.37 | (Turkey) |
| Montenegro | 77.09 | 0.40 | 62.48 | 4.33 | 16.82 | 5.75 | 7.57 | 73.73 | 59.16 | 14.54 | 6.08 | 80.31 | 65.67 | 18.71 | 8.45 | 6.58 | 6.52 | 4.17 | 2.37 | (Montenegro) |
| Hungary | 77.02 | 0.37 | 62.40 | 4.76 | 17.16 | 5.84 | 8.00 | 73.71 | 59.11 | 15.04 | 7.26 | 80.19 | 65.52 | 18.78 | 8.37 | 6.48 | 6.41 | 3.74 | 1.10 | (Hungary) |
| French Guiana | 76.98 | 0.90 | 62.88 | 3.83 | 16.70 | 5.30 | 7.01 | 74.13 | 60.22 | 15.11 | 6.18 | 79.99 | 65.67 | 18.40 | 7.73 | 5.86 | 5.45 | 3.29 | 1.55 | (French Guiana) |
| Curaçao | 76.80 | 0.97 | 62.77 | 4.08 | 16.86 | 5.70 | 7.56 | 72.46 | 58.58 | 13.90 | 5.78 | 80.82 | 66.61 | 19.23 | 8.55 | 8.37 | 8.03 | 5.33 | 2.77 | (Curaçao) |
| Serbia | 76.77 | 0.44 | 62.21 | 4.52 | 16.73 | 6.30 | 8.03 | 73.50 | 58.96 | 14.51 | 6.59 | 80.04 | 65.45 | 18.71 | 9.06 | 6.54 | 6.49 | 4.20 | 2.46 | (Serbia) |
| Malaysia | 76.66 | 0.73 | 62.39 | 5.21 | 17.60 | 6.42 | 9.02 | 74.27 | 60.05 | 16.37 | 8.36 | 79.37 | 65.04 | 18.85 | 9.59 | 5.10 | 4.98 | 2.48 | 1.23 | (Malaysia) |
| Tunisia | 76.51 | 0.99 | 62.50 | 3.88 | 16.39 | 5.70 | 7.09 | 73.92 | 59.98 | 14.88 | 6.41 | 79.15 | 65.07 | 17.79 | 7.57 | 5.23 | 5.09 | 2.91 | 1.16 | (Tunisia) |
| Thailand | 76.41 | 0.90 | 62.31 | 7.29 | 19.61 | 5.05 | 9.65 | 72.16 | 58.15 | 17.79 | 8.87 | 80.86 | 66.66 | 21.19 | 10.21 | 8.70 | 8.51 | 3.40 | 1.34 | (Thailand) |
| Aruba | 76.35 | 1.26 | 62.61 | 3.79 | 16.40 | 4.78 | 6.17 | 73.70 | 60.02 | 14.81 | 5.20 | 78.78 | 64.97 | 17.71 | 6.78 | 5.08 | 4.95 | 2.90 | 1.58 | (Aruba) |
| Algeria | 76.26 | 1.82 | 63.09 | 3.29 | 16.38 | 5.58 | 6.96 | 74.89 | 61.83 | 15.39 | 6.39 | 77.70 | 64.41 | 17.37 | 7.45 | 2.80 | 2.58 | 1.98 | 1.05 | (Algeria) |
| Latvia | 76.19 | 0.35 | 61.54 | 5.95 | 17.49 | 5.78 | 8.27 | 71.56 | 56.87 | 14.55 | 7.13 | 80.47 | 65.86 | 19.50 | 8.74 | 8.91 | 8.98 | 4.95 | 1.61 | (Latvia) |
| Barbados | 76.18 | 0.90 | 62.08 | 4.57 | 16.65 | 5.11 | 6.76 | 73.63 | 59.59 | 15.01 | 5.72 | 78.61 | 64.45 | 18.09 | 7.51 | 4.98 | 4.85 | 3.09 | 1.79 | (Barbados) |
| Cape Verde | 76.06 | 0.99 | 62.05 | 4.61 | 16.65 | 5.39 | 7.05 | 72.86 | 58.89 | 14.92 | 6.21 | 79.21 | 65.14 | 17.88 | 7.46 | 6.35 | 6.25 | 2.96 | 1.25 | (Cape Verde) |
| Mayotte | 76.05 | 0.99 | 62.05 | 4.13 | 16.18 | 5.79 | 6.97 | 74.09 | 60.17 | 14.94 | 6.45 | 78.33 | 64.22 | 17.66 | 7.62 | 4.25 | 4.05 | 2.72 | 1.17 | (Mayotte) |
| Lithuania | 76.03 | 0.33 | 61.35 | 6.03 | 17.38 | 5.83 | 8.21 | 71.22 | 56.57 | 14.38 | 7.09 | 80.67 | 65.96 | 19.48 | 8.70 | 9.46 | 9.40 | 5.10 | 1.61 | (Lithuania) |
| Romania | 75.94 | 0.54 | 61.48 | 5.38 | 16.86 | 5.68 | 7.55 | 72.40 | 57.96 | 14.97 | 7.14 | 79.56 | 65.07 | 18.39 | 7.79 | 7.16 | 7.11 | 3.42 | 0.64 | (Romania) |
| Brazil | 75.85 | 1.17 | 62.02 | 5.77 | 17.79 | 4.97 | 7.77 | 72.76 | 59.01 | 16.39 | 7.13 | 78.98 | 65.06 | 19.03 | 8.23 | 6.22 | 6.05 | 2.64 | 1.10 | (Brazil) |
| Armenia | 75.68 | 0.84 | 61.53 | 4.66 | 16.19 | 5.93 | 7.12 | 71.39 | 57.25 | 13.86 | 6.16 | 79.45 | 65.26 | 17.84 | 7.61 | 8.07 | 8.01 | 3.97 | 1.45 | (Armenia) |
| Bulgaria | 75.64 | 0.53 | 61.16 | 5.38 | 16.54 | 5.82 | 7.36 | 72.16 | 57.68 | 14.47 | 6.73 | 79.21 | 64.74 | 18.25 | 7.72 | 7.05 | 7.06 | 3.78 | 0.99 | (Bulgaria) |
| U.S. Virgin Islands | 75.47 | 0.70 | 61.17 | 4.96 | 16.13 | 6.07 | 7.20 | 70.51 | 56.34 | 13.16 | 5.53 | 81.35 | 66.88 | 19.43 | 8.68 | 10.84 | 10.55 | 6.27 | 3.15 | (United States Virgin Islands) |
| Brunei | 75.33 | 0.88 | 61.21 | 4.98 | 16.19 | 5.95 | 7.14 | 73.33 | 59.24 | 14.83 | 6.53 | 77.56 | 63.40 | 17.57 | 7.68 | 4.23 | 4.17 | 2.74 | 1.15 | (Brunei) |
| Morocco | 75.31 | 1.50 | 61.81 | 4.15 | 15.96 | 5.91 | 6.87 | 73.17 | 59.77 | 14.51 | 6.08 | 77.60 | 64.00 | 17.43 | 7.48 | 4.43 | 4.23 | 2.93 | 1.41 | (Morocco) |
| Grenada | 75.20 | 1.41 | 61.62 | 5.86 | 17.48 | 6.45 | 8.92 | 72.36 | 58.81 | 15.32 | 7.50 | 78.36 | 64.73 | 19.67 | 9.97 | 6.00 | 5.92 | 4.35 | 2.47 | (Grenada) |
| Mexico | 75.07 | 1.10 | 61.17 | 6.52 | 17.70 | 5.60 | 8.29 | 72.24 | 58.40 | 17.04 | 8.38 | 77.81 | 63.84 | 18.26 | 8.23 | 5.57 | 5.44 | 1.22 | −0.15 | (Mexico) |
| Nicaragua | 74.95 | 1.25 | 61.20 | 5.56 | 16.75 | 5.28 | 7.04 | 72.31 | 58.62 | 15.44 | 6.33 | 77.42 | 63.58 | 17.77 | 7.48 | 5.11 | 4.96 | 2.33 | 1.15 | (Nicaragua) |
| Mauritius | 74.93 | 1.22 | 61.14 | 6.34 | 17.48 | 6.13 | 8.61 | 71.94 | 58.22 | 16.16 | 8.06 | 78.18 | 64.32 | 18.71 | 9.05 | 6.25 | 6.10 | 2.55 | 0.99 | (Mauritius) |
| Bangladesh | 74.67 | 2.44 | 62.11 | 5.41 | 17.52 | 5.99 | 8.51 | 73.03 | 60.61 | 16.61 | 7.97 | 76.37 | 63.65 | 18.42 | 8.94 | 3.34 | 3.03 | 1.81 | 0.97 | (Bangladesh) |
| Vietnam | 74.59 | 2.00 | 61.58 | 5.79 | 17.37 | 5.65 | 8.02 | 69.88 | 57.17 | 14.73 | 6.34 | 79.26 | 65.86 | 19.41 | 8.91 | 9.39 | 8.69 | 4.67 | 2.57 | (Vietnam) |
| Bahamas | 74.55 | 1.08 | 60.63 | 7.14 | 17.77 | 6.32 | 9.09 | 70.91 | 57.02 | 15.66 | 7.60 | 78.19 | 64.21 | 19.67 | 10.26 | 7.28 | 7.19 | 4.01 | 2.66 | (The Bahamas) |
| Georgia | 74.50 | 0.81 | 60.31 | 5.85 | 16.16 | 6.17 | 7.32 | 69.57 | 55.42 | 13.38 | 5.39 | 79.11 | 64.86 | 18.16 | 8.30 | 9.54 | 9.44 | 4.78 | 2.91 | (Georgia (country)) |
| Belarus | 74.43 | 0.25 | 59.69 | 6.50 | 16.19 | 5.94 | 7.13 | 69.53 | 54.80 | 13.43 | 6.22 | 79.06 | 64.30 | 18.01 | 7.46 | 9.53 | 9.49 | 4.58 | 1.24 | (Belarus) |
| Azerbaijan | 74.43 | 1.50 | 60.93 | 4.44 | 15.38 | 6.19 | 6.57 | 71.56 | 58.15 | 13.80 | 5.90 | 77.13 | 63.53 | 16.63 | 6.95 | 5.57 | 5.38 | 2.83 | 1.05 | (Azerbaijan) |
| Kazakhstan | 74.40 | 0.87 | 60.27 | 5.98 | 16.26 | 6.09 | 7.35 | 70.11 | 56.05 | 13.84 | 6.30 | 78.39 | 64.18 | 17.87 | 7.76 | 8.28 | 8.13 | 4.03 | 1.46 | (Kazakhstan) |
| Paraguay | 73.84 | 1.44 | 60.29 | 5.96 | 16.25 | 6.21 | 7.46 | 70.89 | 57.42 | 14.73 | 6.62 | 76.95 | 63.29 | 17.65 | 8.07 | 6.07 | 5.87 | 2.92 | 1.46 | (Paraguay) |
| Dominican Republic | 73.72 | 2.47 | 61.19 | 5.94 | 17.13 | 6.18 | 8.31 | 70.53 | 58.11 | 15.25 | 6.98 | 76.97 | 64.31 | 18.81 | 9.24 | 6.44 | 6.19 | 3.56 | 2.26 | (Dominican Republic) |
| North Korea | 73.64 | 1.76 | 60.40 | 5.60 | 15.99 | 5.63 | 6.63 | 71.46 | 58.38 | 14.88 | 5.95 | 75.74 | 62.31 | 16.84 | 6.97 | 4.29 | 3.93 | 1.96 | 1.02 | (North Korea) |
| Suriname | 73.63 | 1.41 | 60.04 | 6.85 | 16.89 | 6.40 | 8.28 | 70.46 | 56.93 | 14.72 | 6.85 | 76.83 | 63.16 | 18.67 | 9.20 | 6.38 | 6.23 | 3.94 | 2.35 | (Suriname) |
| Belize | 73.57 | 0.89 | 59.45 | 5.97 | 15.42 | 6.59 | 7.01 | 70.93 | 56.87 | 14.26 | 6.75 | 76.50 | 62.31 | 16.65 | 7.25 | 5.57 | 5.44 | 2.39 | 0.50 | (Belize) |
| Trinidad and Tobago | 73.49 | 1.36 | 59.85 | 6.49 | 16.34 | 5.54 | 6.89 | 70.38 | 56.81 | 14.84 | 6.18 | 76.68 | 62.96 | 17.61 | 7.32 | 6.30 | 6.14 | 2.77 | 1.14 | (Trinidad and Tobago) |
| Ukraine | 73.42 | 0.62 | 59.04 | 8.83 | 17.87 | 7.01 | 9.88 | 66.90 | 52.52 | 14.74 | 8.37 | 80.20 | 65.81 | 19.91 | 10.48 | 13.30 | 13.29 | 5.17 | 2.11 | (Ukraine) |
| World | 73.17 | 3.29 | 61.46 | 6.11 | 17.57 | 5.75 | 8.31 | 70.55 | 58.91 | 16.01 | 7.43 | 75.89 | 64.09 | 18.98 | 8.96 | 5.34 | 5.18 | 2.97 | 1.53 | |
| Russia | 73.15 | 0.43 | 58.59 | 8.54 | 17.12 | 6.46 | 8.58 | 67.26 | 52.70 | 14.37 | 7.54 | 79.04 | 64.44 | 18.88 | 8.98 | 11.78 | 11.74 | 4.51 | 1.44 | (Russia) |
| Bhutan | 72.97 | 1.92 | 59.89 | 4.92 | 14.81 | 6.40 | 6.21 | 71.31 | 58.37 | 13.84 | 5.79 | 74.97 | 61.72 | 15.90 | 6.63 | 3.66 | 3.35 | 2.05 | 0.84 | (Bhutan) |
| Tonga | 72.89 | 0.98 | 58.87 | 6.54 | 15.41 | 6.54 | 6.96 | 69.37 | 55.40 | 13.51 | 6.14 | 76.41 | 62.32 | 17.18 | 7.53 | 7.04 | 6.92 | 3.66 | 1.39 | (Tonga) |
| Honduras | 72.88 | 1.35 | 59.23 | 5.85 | 15.09 | 6.58 | 6.67 | 70.35 | 56.78 | 13.57 | 5.99 | 75.50 | 61.75 | 16.51 | 7.14 | 5.16 | 4.96 | 2.95 | 1.15 | (Honduras) |
| Seychelles | 72.86 | 1.21 | 59.07 | 6.12 | 15.19 | 6.58 | 6.78 | 69.94 | 56.21 | 13.57 | 6.03 | 76.52 | 62.66 | 16.87 | 7.22 | 6.58 | 6.45 | 3.30 | 1.18 | (Seychelles) |
| Saint Lucia | 72.70 | 1.47 | 59.17 | 5.83 | 15.00 | 6.61 | 6.61 | 69.31 | 55.87 | 13.21 | 5.86 | 76.30 | 62.66 | 16.64 | 7.11 | 6.99 | 6.79 | 3.43 | 1.25 | (Saint Lucia) |
| Guatemala | 72.60 | 1.79 | 59.39 | 6.76 | 16.15 | 5.49 | 6.64 | 70.31 | 57.22 | 15.46 | 6.19 | 74.88 | 61.53 | 16.77 | 7.01 | 4.57 | 4.30 | 1.32 | 0.82 | (Guatemala) |
| Venezuela | 72.51 | 1.62 | 59.14 | 7.39 | 16.53 | 5.36 | 6.89 | 68.72 | 55.42 | 14.92 | 6.21 | 76.50 | 63.02 | 17.92 | 7.34 | 7.78 | 7.60 | 3.00 | 1.14 | (Venezuela) |
| Uzbekistan | 72.39 | 1.21 | 58.60 | 6.17 | 14.77 | 6.35 | 6.12 | 69.45 | 55.72 | 12.94 | 5.41 | 75.40 | 61.54 | 16.33 | 6.50 | 5.95 | 5.83 | 3.40 | 1.09 | (Uzbekistan) |
| Iraq | 72.32 | 1.95 | 59.27 | 5.33 | 14.60 | 6.51 | 6.11 | 70.43 | 57.53 | 13.54 | 5.64 | 74.06 | 60.83 | 15.41 | 6.38 | 3.63 | 3.30 | 1.88 | 0.74 | (Iraq) |
| Syria | 72.12 | 2.08 | 59.20 | 5.67 | 14.88 | 6.39 | 6.27 | 69.83 | 57.00 | 13.66 | 5.69 | 74.41 | 61.38 | 15.97 | 6.69 | 4.58 | 4.38 | 2.31 | 1.00 | (Syria) |
| El Salvador | 72.10 | 1.03 | 58.13 | 8.00 | 16.12 | 5.91 | 7.04 | 67.52 | 53.57 | 14.63 | 6.33 | 76.26 | 62.25 | 17.25 | 7.49 | 8.74 | 8.69 | 2.62 | 1.15 | (El Salvador) |
| India | 72.00 | 2.29 | 59.29 | 6.15 | 15.44 | 7.09 | 7.53 | 70.52 | 57.75 | 14.76 | 7.29 | 73.60 | 60.95 | 16.10 | 7.71 | 3.08 | 3.19 | 1.34 | 0.42 | (India) |
| Tajikistan | 71.79 | 2.37 | 59.16 | 5.22 | 14.38 | 6.73 | 6.12 | 69.57 | 57.18 | 13.20 | 5.62 | 73.98 | 61.09 | 15.43 | 6.46 | 4.40 | 3.91 | 2.23 | 0.84 | (Tajikistan) |
| Mongolia | 71.73 | 1.07 | 57.81 | 7.42 | 15.23 | 6.56 | 6.79 | 67.24 | 53.37 | 13.03 | 5.96 | 76.43 | 62.43 | 16.98 | 7.32 | 9.19 | 9.05 | 3.96 | 1.36 | (Mongolia) |
| Samoa | 71.70 | 1.39 | 58.09 | 6.65 | 14.74 | 6.84 | 6.57 | 69.86 | 56.30 | 13.41 | 5.94 | 73.66 | 59.99 | 16.02 | 7.00 | 3.80 | 3.68 | 2.61 | 1.05 | (Samoa) |
| Kyrgyzstan | 71.68 | 1.40 | 58.08 | 6.01 | 14.09 | 6.78 | 5.87 | 68.18 | 54.69 | 12.47 | 5.27 | 75.25 | 61.51 | 15.44 | 6.25 | 7.07 | 6.82 | 2.97 | 0.98 | (Kyrgyzstan) |
| Egypt | 71.63 | 1.53 | 58.16 | 5.16 | 13.33 | 7.13 | 5.46 | 69.49 | 56.10 | 12.13 | 5.06 | 73.81 | 60.25 | 14.34 | 5.70 | 4.32 | 4.14 | 2.21 | 0.64 | (Egypt) |
| Jamaica | 71.48 | 1.62 | 58.10 | 6.41 | 14.51 | 6.83 | 6.34 | 68.97 | 55.72 | 13.38 | 5.93 | 73.99 | 60.47 | 15.50 | 6.65 | 5.02 | 4.75 | 2.12 | 0.72 | (Jamaica) |
| Vanuatu | 71.48 | 1.53 | 58.01 | 6.42 | 14.43 | 6.82 | 6.25 | 69.44 | 56.01 | 13.25 | 5.87 | 73.93 | 60.42 | 15.90 | 6.87 | 4.48 | 4.41 | 2.65 | 1.00 | (Vanuatu) |
| Western Sahara | 71.39 | 2.35 | 58.73 | 5.60 | 14.33 | 6.65 | 5.98 | 69.69 | 57.28 | 13.45 | 5.64 | 73.55 | 60.63 | 15.31 | 6.35 | 3.86 | 3.35 | 1.87 | 0.71 | (Western Sahara) |
| Saint Vincent and the Grenadines | 71.23 | 1.28 | 57.51 | 7.29 | 14.80 | 6.79 | 6.59 | 68.66 | 54.89 | 13.36 | 6.00 | 74.31 | 60.66 | 16.41 | 7.10 | 5.65 | 5.77 | 3.05 | 1.10 | (Saint Vincent and the Grenadines) |
| Moldova | 71.20 | 1.12 | 57.32 | 7.38 | 14.70 | 7.25 | 6.95 | 66.57 | 52.73 | 12.26 | 5.39 | 75.53 | 61.59 | 16.35 | 7.61 | 8.97 | 8.86 | 4.09 | 2.22 | (Moldova) |
| Indonesia | 71.15 | 1.76 | 57.91 | 6.54 | 14.44 | 6.91 | 6.36 | 69.04 | 55.89 | 13.09 | 5.76 | 73.27 | 59.92 | 15.63 | 6.73 | 4.23 | 4.03 | 2.54 | 0.98 | (Indonesia) |
| Dominica | 71.13 | 2.67 | 58.80 | 5.43 | 14.23 | 6.88 | 6.10 | 68.21 | 56.01 | 12.88 | 5.55 | 74.55 | 62.07 | 15.72 | 6.52 | 6.33 | 6.06 | 2.84 | 0.96 | (Dominica) |
| Cambodia | 70.67 | 2.33 | 58.00 | 7.20 | 15.20 | 6.35 | 6.55 | 68.01 | 55.65 | 14.23 | 6.12 | 73.19 | 60.16 | 15.86 | 6.81 | 5.18 | 4.52 | 1.63 | 0.69 | (Cambodia) |
| Solomon Islands | 70.53 | 1.66 | 57.19 | 6.51 | 13.70 | 7.01 | 5.71 | 69.22 | 55.99 | 13.04 | 5.48 | 71.98 | 58.52 | 14.40 | 5.95 | 2.77 | 2.52 | 1.36 | 0.47 | (Solomon Islands) |
| Nepal | 70.35 | 2.26 | 57.61 | 6.25 | 13.86 | 6.93 | 5.79 | 68.83 | 56.23 | 13.12 | 5.51 | 71.84 | 58.94 | 14.55 | 6.00 | 3.00 | 2.71 | 1.44 | 0.50 | (Nepal) |
| Guyana | 70.18 | 2.00 | 57.18 | 8.15 | 15.33 | 7.60 | 7.93 | 66.51 | 53.64 | 13.44 | 6.86 | 73.94 | 60.78 | 17.01 | 8.68 | 7.44 | 7.14 | 3.57 | 1.81 | (Guyana) |
| Turkmenistan | 70.07 | 3.10 | 58.17 | 5.97 | 14.14 | 6.90 | 6.04 | 66.87 | 55.26 | 12.57 | 5.41 | 72.84 | 60.56 | 15.01 | 6.23 | 5.97 | 5.30 | 2.44 | 0.82 | (Turkmenistan) |
| Greenland | 70.06 | 1.66 | 56.71 | 7.93 | 14.64 | 6.72 | 6.36 | 68.09 | 54.93 | 14.01 | 6.02 | 72.44 | 58.89 | 15.43 | 6.64 | 4.35 | 3.96 | 1.42 | 0.62 | (Greenland) |
| Philippines | 69.83 | 2.25 | 57.09 | 6.94 | 14.02 | 7.10 | 6.12 | 66.89 | 54.26 | 12.51 | 5.47 | 72.82 | 59.93 | 15.23 | 6.42 | 5.93 | 5.67 | 2.71 | 0.94 | (Philippines) |
| São Tomé and Príncipe | 69.72 | 1.23 | 55.95 | 8.38 | 14.33 | 7.24 | 6.57 | 66.24 | 52.45 | 12.54 | 5.82 | 73.73 | 59.97 | 16.12 | 7.06 | 7.49 | 7.52 | 3.58 | 1.24 | (São Tomé and Príncipe) |
| Libya | 69.34 | 3.79 | 58.12 | 7.28 | 15.41 | 6.41 | 6.82 | 68.27 | 56.97 | 14.18 | 6.31 | 70.42 | 59.29 | 16.60 | 7.28 | 2.15 | 2.32 | 2.43 | 0.97 | (Libya) |
| Yemen | 69.30 | 3.23 | 57.52 | 6.43 | 13.95 | 6.88 | 5.83 | 67.23 | 55.68 | 13.05 | 5.49 | 71.39 | 59.37 | 14.71 | 6.06 | 4.15 | 3.69 | 1.66 | 0.57 | (Yemen) |
| Botswana | 69.16 | 3.10 | 57.27 | 7.61 | 14.88 | 7.27 | 7.15 | 66.67 | 54.90 | 13.51 | 6.12 | 71.70 | 59.66 | 16.07 | 7.80 | 5.03 | 4.76 | 2.57 | 1.68 | (Botswana) |
| Laos | 68.96 | 3.19 | 57.15 | 6.60 | 13.75 | 7.01 | 5.76 | 66.78 | 55.26 | 12.83 | 5.41 | 71.25 | 59.11 | 14.61 | 6.02 | 4.47 | 3.85 | 1.78 | 0.62 | (Laos) |
| Senegal | 68.68 | 3.10 | 56.78 | 6.74 | 13.53 | 6.62 | 5.15 | 66.79 | 55.13 | 12.82 | 4.91 | 70.75 | 58.60 | 14.28 | 5.41 | 3.96 | 3.47 | 1.46 | 0.50 | (Senegal) |
| Eritrea | 68.62 | 3.35 | 56.98 | 7.81 | 14.79 | 6.59 | 6.38 | 66.51 | 55.21 | 14.10 | 6.06 | 70.66 | 58.62 | 15.34 | 6.61 | 4.15 | 3.41 | 1.24 | 0.54 | (Eritrea) |
| Bolivia | 68.58 | 3.64 | 57.22 | 7.73 | 14.94 | 7.08 | 7.02 | 66.13 | 54.96 | 13.99 | 6.55 | 71.14 | 59.55 | 15.78 | 7.35 | 5.02 | 4.59 | 1.79 | 0.79 | (Bolivia) |
| Mauritania | 68.48 | 3.10 | 56.59 | 6.92 | 13.51 | 7.30 | 5.81 | 66.50 | 54.81 | 12.46 | 5.40 | 70.48 | 58.35 | 14.52 | 6.16 | 3.98 | 3.54 | 2.06 | 0.76 | (Mauritania) |
| Gabon | 68.34 | 3.07 | 56.41 | 8.09 | 14.50 | 7.19 | 6.69 | 65.91 | 54.18 | 13.59 | 6.38 | 71.05 | 58.91 | 15.36 | 6.94 | 5.15 | 4.73 | 1.76 | 0.56 | (Gabon) |
| Uganda | 68.25 | 3.21 | 56.46 | 9.56 | 16.02 | 7.46 | 8.48 | 65.27 | 53.66 | 14.21 | 7.06 | 71.12 | 59.10 | 17.42 | 9.32 | 5.85 | 5.44 | 3.21 | 2.27 | (Uganda) |
| Rwanda | 67.78 | 2.99 | 55.78 | 8.14 | 13.92 | 7.30 | 6.22 | 65.49 | 53.63 | 13.02 | 5.90 | 69.89 | 57.71 | 14.58 | 6.40 | 4.39 | 4.08 | 1.56 | 0.49 | (Rwanda) |
| Timor-Leste | 67.69 | 3.76 | 56.45 | 7.07 | 13.52 | 7.15 | 5.68 | 66.07 | 55.09 | 12.79 | 5.42 | 69.44 | 57.91 | 14.23 | 5.90 | 3.37 | 2.82 | 1.43 | 0.49 | (Timor-Leste) |
| Pakistan | 67.65 | 4.64 | 57.28 | 6.52 | 13.80 | 6.96 | 5.76 | 65.33 | 55.24 | 12.84 | 5.41 | 70.16 | 59.49 | 14.75 | 6.08 | 4.83 | 4.25 | 1.92 | 0.67 | (Pakistan) |
| Namibia | 67.39 | 3.00 | 55.38 | 9.49 | 14.88 | 7.50 | 7.38 | 63.33 | 51.45 | 12.63 | 5.70 | 71.34 | 59.17 | 16.50 | 8.22 | 8.01 | 7.73 | 3.87 | 2.52 | (Namibia) |
| Malawi | 67.35 | 3.20 | 55.55 | 8.49 | 14.05 | 7.42 | 6.47 | 64.07 | 52.47 | 12.61 | 5.71 | 70.56 | 58.53 | 15.24 | 6.94 | 6.49 | 6.06 | 2.64 | 1.23 | (Malawi) |
| Fiji | 67.32 | 2.21 | 54.52 | 7.60 | 12.13 | 8.40 | 5.53 | 65.34 | 52.69 | 10.79 | 4.66 | 69.36 | 56.41 | 13.33 | 6.09 | 4.02 | 3.73 | 2.54 | 1.43 | (Fiji) |
| Ethiopia | 67.31 | 4.07 | 56.39 | 8.24 | 14.63 | 6.69 | 6.31 | 64.08 | 53.66 | 13.62 | 5.83 | 70.73 | 59.20 | 15.53 | 6.68 | 6.65 | 5.54 | 1.92 | 0.85 | (Ethiopia) |
| Federated States of Micronesia | 67.20 | 1.95 | 54.15 | 9.27 | 13.42 | 7.72 | 6.14 | 63.49 | 50.55 | 11.59 | 5.35 | 71.12 | 57.93 | 15.00 | 6.50 | 7.63 | 7.37 | 3.41 | 1.15 | (Federated States of Micronesia) |
| Tanzania | 67.00 | 3.15 | 55.15 | 9.60 | 14.75 | 7.55 | 7.30 | 64.20 | 52.45 | 12.97 | 5.93 | 69.78 | 57.79 | 16.29 | 8.31 | 5.58 | 5.33 | 3.32 | 2.38 | (Tanzania) |
| Myanmar | 66.89 | 3.29 | 55.18 | 8.18 | 13.36 | 7.26 | 5.62 | 63.79 | 52.35 | 12.29 | 5.22 | 70.16 | 58.12 | 14.27 | 5.88 | 6.37 | 5.78 | 1.99 | 0.66 | (Myanmar) |
| Comoros | 66.78 | 3.73 | 55.51 | 7.61 | 13.12 | 7.53 | 5.65 | 64.79 | 53.63 | 12.10 | 5.28 | 68.93 | 57.54 | 14.11 | 5.96 | 4.15 | 3.90 | 2.00 | 0.69 | (Comoros) |
| Kiribati | 66.47 | 4.38 | 55.86 | 7.59 | 13.44 | 7.23 | 5.68 | 64.58 | 54.27 | 12.58 | 5.34 | 68.17 | 57.19 | 14.03 | 5.84 | 3.59 | 2.92 | 1.45 | 0.50 | (Kiribati) |
| Zambia | 66.35 | 4.17 | 55.52 | 7.32 | 12.84 | 7.46 | 5.29 | 63.94 | 53.44 | 11.92 | 4.82 | 68.67 | 57.48 | 13.51 | 5.58 | 4.74 | 4.03 | 1.60 | 0.76 | (Zambia) |
| Sudan | 66.33 | 4.43 | 55.76 | 8.68 | 14.44 | 6.79 | 6.23 | 63.27 | 53.04 | 13.68 | 5.86 | 69.63 | 58.65 | 15.36 | 6.61 | 6.35 | 5.61 | 1.68 | 0.75 | (Sudan) |
| South Africa | 66.14 | 2.87 | 54.01 | 10.95 | 14.96 | 7.61 | 7.57 | 62.61 | 50.55 | 13.15 | 6.65 | 69.60 | 57.37 | 16.30 | 8.04 | 6.99 | 6.82 | 3.14 | 1.39 | (South Africa) |
| Papua New Guinea | 66.13 | 3.21 | 54.35 | 8.48 | 12.82 | 7.81 | 5.63 | 63.74 | 52.07 | 11.74 | 5.23 | 69.08 | 57.17 | 14.18 | 6.04 | 5.35 | 5.09 | 2.44 | 0.81 | (Papua New Guinea) |
| Afghanistan | 66.03 | 4.50 | 55.53 | 7.80 | 13.33 | 7.28 | 5.61 | 64.47 | 54.15 | 12.57 | 5.33 | 67.54 | 56.82 | 13.94 | 5.81 | 3.07 | 2.67 | 1.37 | 0.47 | (Afghanistan) |
| Djibouti | 65.99 | 4.58 | 55.57 | 8.76 | 14.33 | 6.86 | 6.19 | 63.52 | 53.48 | 13.54 | 5.80 | 68.51 | 57.67 | 15.02 | 6.48 | 4.99 | 4.19 | 1.48 | 0.68 | (Djibouti) |
| Gambia | 65.86 | 4.22 | 55.08 | 9.05 | 14.13 | 6.95 | 6.08 | 64.17 | 53.67 | 13.59 | 5.82 | 67.53 | 56.45 | 14.60 | 6.30 | 3.36 | 2.78 | 1.01 | 0.48 | (The Gambia) |
| Congo | 65.77 | 3.18 | 53.96 | 9.23 | 13.19 | 7.64 | 5.83 | 64.12 | 52.45 | 12.45 | 5.64 | 67.46 | 55.49 | 13.87 | 5.98 | 3.34 | 3.04 | 1.42 | 0.33 | (Republic of the Congo) |
| Ghana | 65.50 | 4.08 | 54.58 | 9.42 | 14.00 | 7.05 | 6.05 | 63.13 | 52.56 | 13.25 | 5.67 | 67.94 | 56.63 | 14.65 | 6.32 | 4.81 | 4.07 | 1.40 | 0.65 | (Ghana) |
| Palestine | 65.17 | 3.31 | 53.48 | 12.44 | 15.92 | 6.16 | 7.08 | 59.69 | 47.91 | 13.97 | 6.01 | 71.50 | 59.90 | 17.91 | 7.90 | 11.81 | 11.99 | 3.94 | 1.89 | (Palestine) |
| Haiti | 64.94 | 4.48 | 54.42 | 8.71 | 13.13 | 7.42 | 5.54 | 61.73 | 51.54 | 12.05 | 5.14 | 68.30 | 57.39 | 14.05 | 5.81 | 6.57 | 5.84 | 2.00 | 0.67 | (Haiti) |
| Angola | 64.62 | 5.06 | 54.67 | 8.77 | 13.45 | 7.53 | 5.98 | 62.10 | 52.41 | 12.48 | 5.55 | 67.14 | 56.92 | 14.28 | 6.26 | 5.04 | 4.51 | 1.80 | 0.71 | (Angola) |
| Eswatini | 64.12 | 3.84 | 52.96 | 11.28 | 14.24 | 7.70 | 6.94 | 61.19 | 50.10 | 13.12 | 6.57 | 66.95 | 55.69 | 15.07 | 7.17 | 5.77 | 5.59 | 1.95 | 0.60 | (Eswatini) |
| Guinea-Bissau | 64.08 | 5.52 | 54.60 | 9.07 | 13.67 | 7.43 | 6.10 | 61.66 | 52.44 | 12.71 | 5.70 | 66.36 | 56.55 | 14.35 | 6.38 | 4.71 | 4.11 | 1.64 | 0.68 | (Guinea-Bissau) |
| Equatorial Guinea | 63.71 | 5.51 | 54.21 | 8.99 | 13.21 | 7.61 | 5.82 | 62.04 | 52.87 | 12.66 | 5.62 | 65.66 | 55.84 | 13.72 | 5.97 | 3.62 | 2.98 | 1.06 | 0.35 | (Equatorial Guinea) |
| Cameroon | 63.70 | 5.34 | 54.04 | 9.03 | 13.07 | 7.58 | 5.65 | 61.52 | 52.12 | 12.36 | 5.50 | 65.94 | 56.00 | 13.70 | 5.76 | 4.42 | 3.88 | 1.34 | 0.26 | (Cameroon) |
| Burundi | 63.65 | 4.78 | 53.43 | 10.22 | 13.65 | 7.26 | 5.91 | 61.60 | 51.64 | 12.98 | 5.55 | 65.70 | 55.18 | 14.19 | 6.14 | 4.10 | 3.54 | 1.21 | 0.58 | (Burundi) |
| Kenya | 63.65 | 3.18 | 51.83 | 12.19 | 14.02 | 7.94 | 6.96 | 61.46 | 49.74 | 12.90 | 6.31 | 65.92 | 53.99 | 14.97 | 7.34 | 4.46 | 4.24 | 2.07 | 1.03 | (Kenya) |
| Madagascar | 63.63 | 5.77 | 54.40 | 9.52 | 13.92 | 7.08 | 6.00 | 61.94 | 53.01 | 13.40 | 5.74 | 65.38 | 55.81 | 14.39 | 6.22 | 3.44 | 2.81 | 0.99 | 0.48 | (Madagascar) |
| Mozambique | 63.61 | 4.96 | 53.57 | 9.04 | 12.61 | 7.59 | 5.20 | 60.30 | 50.37 | 11.66 | 4.98 | 66.54 | 56.32 | 13.13 | 5.37 | 6.24 | 5.95 | 1.48 | 0.39 | (Mozambique) |
| Zimbabwe | 62.77 | 3.51 | 51.28 | 11.94 | 13.22 | 8.11 | 6.33 | 60.23 | 48.82 | 11.88 | 5.54 | 65.01 | 53.40 | 14.29 | 6.86 | 4.79 | 4.58 | 2.40 | 1.32 | (Zimbabwe) |
| Togo | 62.74 | 5.06 | 52.80 | 9.47 | 12.27 | 7.44 | 4.71 | 62.54 | 52.67 | 12.09 | 4.65 | 62.92 | 52.90 | 12.43 | 4.76 | 0.39 | 0.23 | 0.34 | 0.11 | (Togo) |
| Liberia | 62.16 | 5.38 | 52.54 | 9.84 | 12.38 | 7.98 | 5.36 | 60.88 | 51.58 | 12.15 | 5.39 | 63.44 | 53.47 | 12.57 | 5.33 | 2.57 | 1.89 | 0.42 | −0.06 | (Liberia) |
| Ivory Coast | 61.94 | 5.09 | 52.03 | 11.11 | 13.15 | 8.12 | 6.27 | 60.02 | 50.56 | 12.30 | 5.81 | 64.13 | 53.75 | 14.08 | 6.67 | 4.12 | 3.19 | 1.78 | 0.86 | (Ivory Coast) |
| DR Congo | 61.90 | 6.42 | 53.31 | 10.28 | 13.60 | 7.28 | 5.88 | 59.79 | 51.58 | 12.97 | 5.55 | 64.04 | 55.05 | 14.15 | 6.12 | 4.25 | 3.47 | 1.17 | 0.57 | (Democratic Republic of the Congo) |
| Sierra Leone | 61.79 | 7.46 | 54.24 | 8.35 | 12.59 | 7.75 | 5.34 | 60.06 | 52.92 | 11.91 | 5.06 | 63.50 | 55.54 | 13.18 | 5.56 | 3.44 | 2.62 | 1.27 | 0.50 | (Sierra Leone) |
| Niger | 61.18 | 8.74 | 54.93 | 8.02 | 12.95 | 7.02 | 4.96 | 60.26 | 54.06 | 12.51 | 4.80 | 62.13 | 55.81 | 13.34 | 5.08 | 1.87 | 1.75 | 0.83 | 0.28 | (Niger) |
| Burkina Faso | 61.09 | 6.22 | 52.31 | 10.08 | 12.38 | 7.38 | 4.77 | 58.92 | 50.23 | 11.72 | 4.53 | 63.22 | 54.31 | 12.87 | 4.91 | 4.30 | 4.08 | 1.15 | 0.38 | (Burkina Faso) |
| Benin | 60.77 | 6.86 | 52.63 | 10.75 | 13.38 | 7.41 | 5.79 | 59.35 | 51.45 | 12.92 | 5.53 | 62.21 | 53.79 | 13.76 | 5.96 | 2.86 | 2.34 | 0.84 | 0.44 | (Benin) |
| Guinea | 60.74 | 7.74 | 53.48 | 10.14 | 13.63 | 7.25 | 5.88 | 59.52 | 52.55 | 13.25 | 5.67 | 61.90 | 54.31 | 13.91 | 6.02 | 2.38 | 1.76 | 0.66 | 0.35 | (Guinea) |
| Mali | 60.44 | 7.19 | 52.63 | 9.71 | 12.34 | 7.40 | 4.75 | 59.04 | 51.36 | 11.89 | 4.59 | 61.90 | 53.95 | 12.75 | 4.87 | 2.86 | 2.59 | 0.87 | 0.28 | (Mali) |
| Somalia | 58.82 | 8.28 | 52.09 | 11.40 | 13.49 | 7.36 | 5.85 | 56.35 | 49.77 | 12.90 | 5.55 | 61.39 | 54.48 | 14.00 | 6.07 | 5.04 | 4.72 | 1.10 | 0.51 | (Somalia) |
| South Sudan | 57.62 | 8.34 | 50.95 | 12.03 | 12.98 | 7.65 | 5.63 | 54.64 | 48.21 | 12.05 | 5.14 | 60.63 | 53.64 | 13.71 | 5.93 | 5.99 | 5.43 | 1.66 | 0.80 | (South Sudan) |
| Central African Republic | 57.41 | 6.89 | 49.30 | 13.55 | 12.85 | 8.43 | 6.28 | 55.26 | 47.41 | 11.89 | 5.60 | 59.29 | 50.86 | 13.65 | 6.74 | 4.03 | 3.46 | 1.77 | 1.14 | (Central African Republic) |
| Lesotho | 57.38 | 5.02 | 47.40 | 15.46 | 12.86 | 8.67 | 6.53 | 54.62 | 44.77 | 11.33 | 5.65 | 60.01 | 49.85 | 13.86 | 7.00 | 5.39 | 5.09 | 2.53 | 1.35 | (Lesotho) |
| Chad | 55.07 | 8.68 | 48.75 | 13.50 | 12.25 | 8.04 | 5.29 | 53.20 | 47.11 | 11.69 | 4.98 | 57.01 | 50.41 | 12.75 | 5.53 | 3.82 | 3.30 | 1.07 | 0.55 | (Chad) |
| Nigeria | 54.46 | 9.01 | 48.48 | 13.67 | 12.14 | 8.09 | 5.23 | 54.18 | 48.20 | 11.99 | 5.11 | 54.74 | 48.74 | 12.28 | 5.33 | 0.57 | 0.54 | 0.29 | 0.22 | (Nigeria) |

=== UN: Change of life expectancy from 2019 to 2023 ===
UN: Change of life expectancy from 2019 to 2023
| Countries and territories | 2023 | | | | Historical data | | | | | | | | | Recovery from COVID-19: 2019→2023 | |
| Countries and territories | All | Male | Female | Sex gap | 2019 | 2019 →2020 | 2020 | 2020 →2021 | 2021 | 2021 →2022 | 2022 | 2022 →2023 | 2023 | Recovery from COVID-19: 2019→2023 | |
|---|---|---|---|---|---|---|---|---|---|---|---|---|---|---|---|
| Japan | 84.71 | 81.69 | 87.74 | 6.05 | 84.42 | 0.25 | 84.67 | −0.12 | 84.55 | −0.50 | 84.05 | 0.66 | 84.71 | 0.29 | (Japan) |
| South Korea | 84.33 | 81.19 | 87.16 | 5.96 | 83.69 | −0.01 | 83.67 | 0.18 | 83.85 | −1.12 | 82.73 | 1.60 | 84.33 | 0.64 | (South Korea) |
| French Polynesia | 84.07 | 81.78 | 86.50 | 4.73 | 83.19 | −0.74 | 82.46 | −2.89 | 79.57 | 4.29 | 83.86 | 0.21 | 84.07 | 0.88 | (French Polynesia) |
| Andorra | 84.04 | 82.10 | 86.11 | 4.01 | 84.10 | −4.68 | 79.42 | 2.91 | 82.33 | 1.69 | 84.02 | 0.03 | 84.04 | −0.06 | (Andorra) |
| Switzerland | 83.95 | 82.01 | 85.83 | 3.82 | 83.78 | −0.72 | 83.06 | 0.58 | 83.65 | −0.45 | 83.20 | 0.75 | 83.95 | 0.17 | (Switzerland) |
| Australia | 83.92 | 82.10 | 85.74 | 3.64 | 83.24 | 0.42 | 83.66 | −0.10 | 83.56 | −0.80 | 82.77 | 1.16 | 83.92 | 0.68 | (Australia) |
| Singapore | 83.74 | 81.24 | 86.24 | 5.00 | 83.66 | 0.00 | 83.66 | −0.18 | 83.48 | −0.56 | 82.92 | 0.81 | 83.74 | 0.07 | (Singapore) |
| Italy | 83.72 | 81.57 | 85.75 | 4.18 | 83.34 | −1.16 | 82.18 | 0.68 | 82.86 | −0.81 | 82.05 | 1.66 | 83.72 | 0.37 | (Italy) |
| Spain | 83.67 | 80.96 | 86.31 | 5.35 | 83.48 | −1.24 | 82.24 | 0.71 | 82.95 | −0.58 | 82.37 | 1.30 | 83.67 | 0.19 | (Spain) |
| Réunion | 83.55 | 80.53 | 86.33 | 5.80 | 82.32 | 0.26 | 82.58 | −1.08 | 81.50 | 0.00 | 81.50 | 2.05 | 83.55 | 1.23 | (Réunion) |
| France | 83.33 | 80.43 | 86.09 | 5.66 | 82.73 | −0.53 | 82.20 | 0.12 | 82.32 | 0.15 | 82.47 | 0.85 | 83.33 | 0.59 | (France) |
| Norway | 83.31 | 81.75 | 84.85 | 3.10 | 82.95 | 0.24 | 83.19 | −0.03 | 83.17 | −0.54 | 82.63 | 0.68 | 83.31 | 0.35 | (Norway) |
| Malta | 83.30 | 81.27 | 85.26 | 3.99 | 82.84 | −0.50 | 82.34 | −0.02 | 82.32 | −0.07 | 82.25 | 1.05 | 83.30 | 0.46 | (Malta) |
| Guernsey | 83.27 | 81.01 | 85.58 | 4.56 | 83.28 | 0.07 | 83.35 | −1.38 | 81.97 | 1.14 | 83.11 | 0.17 | 83.27 | −0.01 | (Guernsey) |
| Sweden | 83.26 | 81.44 | 85.10 | 3.66 | 83.05 | −0.62 | 82.43 | 0.59 | 83.02 | 0.03 | 83.05 | 0.22 | 83.26 | 0.21 | (Sweden) |
| Macao, China | 83.08 | 80.83 | 85.25 | 4.42 | 83.29 | 1.32 | 84.61 | −0.79 | 83.82 | −1.72 | 82.10 | 0.97 | 83.08 | −0.22 | (Macau) |
| United Arab Emirates | 82.91 | 81.98 | 84.20 | 2.23 | 82.60 | −0.66 | 81.94 | −2.85 | 79.08 | 1.40 | 80.49 | 2.42 | 82.91 | 0.31 | (United Arab Emirates) |
| Iceland | 82.69 | 80.98 | 84.51 | 3.52 | 82.85 | −0.14 | 82.71 | 0.13 | 82.84 | −1.25 | 81.59 | 1.10 | 82.69 | −0.16 | (Iceland) |
| Canada | 82.63 | 80.43 | 84.83 | 4.40 | 82.28 | −0.63 | 81.65 | 0.32 | 81.98 | −0.73 | 81.25 | 1.38 | 82.63 | 0.34 | (Canada) |
| Martinique | 82.56 | 79.25 | 85.62 | 6.36 | 82.07 | −1.81 | 80.27 | −2.53 | 77.74 | 3.10 | 80.84 | 1.73 | 82.56 | 0.49 | (Martinique) |
| Ireland | 82.41 | 80.37 | 84.48 | 4.11 | 82.41 | −0.02 | 82.39 | −0.53 | 81.86 | 0.19 | 82.05 | 0.36 | 82.41 | 0.00 | (Republic of Ireland) |
| Israel | 82.41 | 80.18 | 84.59 | 4.41 | 82.91 | −0.20 | 82.70 | −0.18 | 82.52 | 0.30 | 82.81 | −0.41 | 82.41 | −0.50 | (Israel) |
| Qatar | 82.37 | 81.61 | 83.37 | 1.76 | 82.94 | −2.54 | 80.41 | 0.67 | 81.08 | 0.77 | 81.86 | 0.51 | 82.37 | −0.58 | (Qatar) |
| Portugal | 82.36 | 79.44 | 85.12 | 5.68 | 81.96 | −0.59 | 81.37 | 0.03 | 81.40 | −0.20 | 81.19 | 1.17 | 82.36 | 0.40 | (Portugal) |
| Bermuda | 82.31 | 78.86 | 85.74 | 6.89 | 81.25 | 0.20 | 81.46 | 0.29 | 81.75 | 0.32 | 82.06 | 0.25 | 82.31 | 1.06 | (Bermuda) |
| Luxembourg | 82.23 | 80.57 | 83.84 | 3.27 | 81.59 | −0.18 | 81.41 | 0.43 | 81.84 | 0.36 | 82.20 | 0.03 | 82.23 | 0.64 | (Luxembourg) |
| Netherlands | 82.16 | 80.54 | 83.74 | 3.20 | 82.05 | −0.66 | 81.39 | −0.04 | 81.36 | 0.56 | 81.91 | 0.25 | 82.16 | 0.10 | (Netherlands) |
| Belgium | 82.11 | 79.86 | 84.33 | 4.47 | 81.83 | −1.04 | 80.80 | 0.86 | 81.66 | −0.50 | 81.16 | 0.96 | 82.11 | 0.28 | (Belgium) |
| New Zealand | 82.09 | 80.41 | 83.77 | 3.36 | 81.83 | 0.83 | 82.66 | −0.36 | 82.30 | −1.29 | 81.01 | 1.08 | 82.09 | 0.26 | (New Zealand) |
| Guadeloupe | 82.05 | 78.13 | 85.53 | 7.40 | 81.39 | −0.74 | 80.65 | −2.44 | 78.21 | 2.69 | 80.91 | 1.15 | 82.05 | 0.66 | (Guadeloupe) |
| Austria | 81.96 | 79.54 | 84.32 | 4.78 | 81.91 | −0.10 | 81.80 | 0.02 | 81.82 | −0.52 | 81.30 | 0.66 | 81.96 | 0.05 | (Austria) |
| Denmark | 81.93 | 80.02 | 83.86 | 3.84 | 81.43 | 0.11 | 81.55 | −0.11 | 81.44 | −0.14 | 81.29 | 0.64 | 81.93 | 0.50 | (Denmark) |
| Finland | 81.91 | 79.17 | 84.67 | 5.50 | 81.86 | −0.04 | 81.82 | −0.01 | 81.81 | −0.57 | 81.24 | 0.67 | 81.91 | 0.05 | (Finland) |
| Greece | 81.86 | 79.29 | 84.33 | 5.04 | 81.35 | 0.19 | 81.54 | −1.00 | 80.53 | −0.59 | 79.94 | 1.91 | 81.86 | 0.51 | (Greece) |
| Puerto Rico | 81.69 | 78.03 | 85.24 | 7.21 | 81.44 | −1.43 | 80.01 | −0.24 | 79.77 | −0.34 | 79.43 | 2.26 | 81.69 | 0.25 | (Puerto Rico) |
| Cyprus | 81.65 | 79.64 | 83.67 | 4.03 | 81.45 | −0.22 | 81.23 | −0.66 | 80.57 | −0.14 | 80.43 | 1.21 | 81.65 | 0.19 | (Cyprus) |
| Slovenia | 81.60 | 78.90 | 84.34 | 5.44 | 81.01 | −0.64 | 80.36 | 0.07 | 80.43 | 0.36 | 80.79 | 0.81 | 81.60 | 0.60 | (Slovenia) |
| Germany | 81.38 | 79.02 | 83.76 | 4.74 | 81.19 | −0.18 | 81.00 | 0.10 | 81.11 | −0.53 | 80.58 | 0.80 | 81.38 | 0.19 | (Germany) |
| United Kingdom | 81.30 | 79.36 | 83.21 | 3.85 | 81.44 | −1.06 | 80.39 | 0.32 | 80.71 | 0.37 | 81.07 | 0.23 | 81.30 | −0.14 | (United Kingdom) |
| Bahrain | 81.28 | 80.67 | 81.99 | 1.31 | 80.47 | −1.79 | 78.68 | −0.60 | 78.08 | 2.91 | 80.99 | 0.29 | 81.28 | 0.81 | (Bahrain) |
| Chile | 81.17 | 79.24 | 83.08 | 3.84 | 80.32 | −0.97 | 79.35 | −0.47 | 78.88 | 0.30 | 79.18 | 1.99 | 81.17 | 0.84 | (Chile) |
| Maldives | 81.04 | 79.69 | 82.82 | 3.13 | 79.71 | −0.99 | 78.71 | −0.66 | 78.05 | 2.71 | 80.76 | 0.28 | 81.04 | 1.33 | (Maldives) |
| Isle of Man | 81.00 | 78.93 | 83.13 | 4.21 | 80.74 | −0.15 | 80.59 | −0.17 | 80.42 | 0.54 | 80.96 | 0.04 | 81.00 | 0.26 | (Isle of Man) |
| Costa Rica | 80.80 | 78.13 | 83.42 | 5.29 | 80.30 | −0.57 | 79.72 | −1.68 | 78.05 | 1.27 | 79.32 | 1.48 | 80.80 | 0.50 | (Costa Rica) |
| Taiwan | 80.56 | 77.63 | 83.61 | 5.98 | 80.60 | 0.51 | 81.11 | −0.32 | 80.78 | −0.63 | 80.16 | 0.40 | 80.56 | −0.04 | (Taiwan) |
| Kuwait | 80.41 | 79.25 | 81.85 | 2.59 | 80.02 | −1.77 | 78.25 | −0.62 | 77.62 | 1.16 | 78.79 | 1.62 | 80.41 | 0.38 | (Kuwait) |
| Cayman Islands | 80.36 | 77.98 | 82.87 | 4.89 | 79.05 | 0.18 | 79.23 | 0.07 | 79.30 | 0.68 | 79.98 | 0.37 | 80.36 | 1.31 | (Cayman Islands) |
| Faroe Islands | 80.18 | 78.17 | 82.50 | 4.33 | 79.91 | 0.08 | 79.98 | −0.19 | 79.79 | −0.53 | 79.26 | 0.92 | 80.18 | 0.27 | (Faroe Islands) |
| Oman | 80.03 | 78.49 | 81.88 | 3.39 | 79.95 | −2.18 | 77.76 | −1.79 | 75.97 | 1.94 | 77.91 | 2.12 | 80.03 | 0.09 | (Oman) |
| Czech Republic | 79.83 | 77.00 | 82.64 | 5.64 | 79.19 | −0.95 | 78.24 | −1.00 | 77.23 | 1.93 | 79.17 | 0.67 | 79.83 | 0.65 | (Czech Republic) |
| Jersey | 79.71 | 77.72 | 81.76 | 4.04 | 79.89 | −0.45 | 79.45 | −0.12 | 79.32 | 0.40 | 79.73 | −0.02 | 79.71 | −0.19 | (Jersey) |
| Albania | 79.60 | 77.73 | 81.45 | 3.72 | 79.47 | −1.64 | 77.82 | −0.98 | 76.84 | 1.93 | 78.77 | 0.83 | 79.60 | 0.14 | (Albania) |
| Panama | 79.59 | 76.65 | 82.56 | 5.90 | 78.51 | −2.18 | 76.33 | 0.67 | 77.00 | 2.32 | 79.32 | 0.27 | 79.59 | 1.08 | (Panama) |
| United States | 79.30 | 76.86 | 81.85 | 4.99 | 78.92 | −1.91 | 77.01 | −0.63 | 76.38 | 1.59 | 77.98 | 1.32 | 79.30 | 0.39 | (United States) |
| Estonia | 79.15 | 74.90 | 83.04 | 8.14 | 78.77 | 0.12 | 78.89 | −1.48 | 77.41 | 0.76 | 78.17 | 0.99 | 79.15 | 0.38 | (Estonia) |
| New Caledonia | 78.77 | 76.28 | 81.29 | 5.01 | 77.26 | −0.21 | 77.05 | 0.06 | 77.11 | 0.58 | 77.70 | 1.07 | 78.77 | 1.50 | (New Caledonia) |
| Saudi Arabia | 78.73 | 77.10 | 81.16 | 4.06 | 78.31 | −0.72 | 77.60 | −0.51 | 77.09 | 0.22 | 77.31 | 1.42 | 78.73 | 0.42 | (Saudi Arabia) |
| Poland | 78.63 | 74.88 | 82.35 | 7.48 | 77.92 | −1.33 | 76.59 | −0.96 | 75.64 | 2.28 | 77.92 | 0.71 | 78.63 | 0.71 | (Poland) |
| Croatia | 78.58 | 75.41 | 81.69 | 6.28 | 78.20 | −0.70 | 77.50 | −0.36 | 77.14 | 1.14 | 78.28 | 0.30 | 78.58 | 0.38 | (Croatia) |
| Slovakia | 78.34 | 75.02 | 81.58 | 6.56 | 77.69 | −0.82 | 76.86 | −2.27 | 74.59 | 2.45 | 77.04 | 1.30 | 78.34 | 0.66 | (Slovakia) |
| Uruguay | 78.14 | 74.19 | 81.92 | 7.73 | 77.50 | 0.88 | 78.38 | −2.95 | 75.43 | 1.03 | 76.47 | 1.67 | 78.14 | 0.64 | (Uruguay) |
| Cuba | 78.08 | 75.67 | 80.52 | 4.85 | 77.41 | −0.01 | 77.41 | −4.21 | 73.20 | 4.43 | 77.63 | 0.46 | 78.08 | 0.67 | (Cuba) |
| Kosovo | 78.03 | 75.80 | 80.12 | 4.31 | 77.25 | −3.04 | 74.21 | 0.77 | 74.98 | 2.64 | 77.62 | 0.41 | 78.03 | 0.78 | |
| China | 77.95 | 75.20 | 80.93 | 5.72 | 77.94 | 0.08 | 78.02 | 0.10 | 78.12 | 0.09 | 78.20 | −0.25 | 77.95 | 0.01 | (China) |
| Bosnia and Herzegovina | 77.85 | 74.42 | 80.90 | 6.48 | 77.39 | −1.35 | 76.04 | −1.47 | 74.57 | 2.21 | 76.78 | 1.07 | 77.85 | 0.46 | (Bosnia and Herzegovina) |
| Lebanon | 77.82 | 75.74 | 79.73 | 3.99 | 78.21 | −1.91 | 76.30 | −2.65 | 73.65 | 4.35 | 78.00 | −0.19 | 77.82 | −0.39 | (Lebanon) |
| Jordan | 77.81 | 75.71 | 80.19 | 4.48 | 76.86 | −1.28 | 75.58 | −1.38 | 74.20 | 2.88 | 77.09 | 0.73 | 77.81 | 0.95 | (Jordan) |
| Peru | 77.74 | 75.41 | 80.12 | 4.71 | 76.28 | −2.44 | 73.83 | −2.24 | 71.60 | 5.24 | 76.83 | 0.91 | 77.74 | 1.47 | (Peru) |
| Colombia | 77.72 | 74.95 | 80.45 | 5.50 | 76.79 | −2.04 | 74.76 | −2.06 | 72.70 | 3.81 | 76.51 | 1.22 | 77.72 | 0.93 | (Colombia) |
| Iran | 77.65 | 75.79 | 79.63 | 3.84 | 76.86 | −2.71 | 74.14 | −0.39 | 73.75 | 3.05 | 76.80 | 0.85 | 77.65 | 0.80 | (Iran) |
| Antigua and Barbuda | 77.60 | 74.55 | 80.29 | 5.75 | 77.17 | −0.01 | 77.16 | 0.04 | 77.20 | 0.29 | 77.48 | 0.12 | 77.60 | 0.43 | (Antigua and Barbuda) |
| Sri Lanka | 77.48 | 74.24 | 80.59 | 6.35 | 76.70 | 0.23 | 76.93 | −0.65 | 76.28 | 1.02 | 77.30 | 0.18 | 77.48 | 0.79 | (Sri Lanka) |
| North Macedonia | 77.39 | 75.11 | 79.57 | 4.46 | 76.83 | −2.37 | 74.47 | −1.18 | 73.29 | 3.35 | 76.64 | 0.75 | 77.39 | 0.56 | (North Macedonia) |
| Argentina | 77.39 | 74.81 | 79.88 | 5.07 | 76.85 | −0.97 | 75.88 | −1.93 | 73.95 | 1.86 | 75.81 | 1.59 | 77.39 | 0.55 | (Argentina) |
| Ecuador | 77.39 | 74.66 | 80.14 | 5.47 | 77.29 | −5.28 | 72.00 | 0.74 | 72.75 | 3.83 | 76.58 | 0.81 | 77.39 | 0.11 | (Ecuador) |
| Guam | 77.21 | 73.44 | 81.42 | 7.98 | 76.64 | −1.12 | 75.53 | −0.10 | 75.43 | 1.67 | 77.10 | 0.11 | 77.21 | 0.56 | (Guam) |
| Turkey | 77.16 | 74.53 | 79.86 | 5.33 | 77.74 | −1.21 | 76.53 | −0.80 | 75.72 | 1.87 | 77.59 | −0.43 | 77.16 | −0.58 | (Turkey) |
| Montenegro | 77.09 | 73.73 | 80.31 | 6.58 | 76.64 | −0.79 | 75.85 | −2.06 | 73.79 | 2.13 | 75.92 | 1.17 | 77.09 | 0.45 | (Montenegro) |
| Hungary | 77.02 | 73.71 | 80.19 | 6.48 | 76.45 | −0.72 | 75.73 | −1.54 | 74.19 | 2.03 | 76.21 | 0.81 | 77.02 | 0.57 | (Hungary) |
| French Guiana | 76.98 | 74.13 | 79.99 | 5.86 | 76.57 | 0.94 | 77.51 | −3.31 | 74.19 | 2.60 | 76.79 | 0.18 | 76.98 | 0.41 | (French Guiana) |
| Curaçao | 76.80 | 72.46 | 80.82 | 8.37 | 76.49 | 0.01 | 76.50 | −0.81 | 75.69 | 1.04 | 76.73 | 0.07 | 76.80 | 0.31 | (Curaçao) |
| Serbia | 76.77 | 73.50 | 80.04 | 6.54 | 76.06 | −1.55 | 74.51 | −1.65 | 72.85 | 2.62 | 75.48 | 1.29 | 76.77 | 0.71 | (Serbia) |
| Malaysia | 76.66 | 74.27 | 79.37 | 5.10 | 75.90 | 0.16 | 76.06 | −2.14 | 73.92 | 1.53 | 75.44 | 1.21 | 76.66 | 0.76 | (Malaysia) |
| Tunisia | 76.51 | 73.92 | 79.15 | 5.23 | 75.60 | −0.59 | 75.00 | −2.11 | 72.89 | 3.16 | 76.05 | 0.46 | 76.51 | 0.91 | (Tunisia) |
| Thailand | 76.41 | 72.16 | 80.86 | 8.70 | 77.20 | 0.13 | 77.33 | 0.28 | 77.61 | −2.31 | 75.29 | 1.12 | 76.41 | −0.79 | (Thailand) |
| Aruba | 76.35 | 73.70 | 78.78 | 5.08 | 76.02 | −0.61 | 75.41 | −1.75 | 73.66 | 2.57 | 76.23 | 0.13 | 76.35 | 0.33 | (Aruba) |
| Algeria | 76.26 | 74.89 | 77.70 | 2.80 | 75.68 | −2.42 | 73.26 | 1.95 | 75.21 | 0.92 | 76.13 | 0.13 | 76.26 | 0.58 | (Algeria) |
| Latvia | 76.19 | 71.56 | 80.47 | 8.91 | 75.63 | −0.15 | 75.48 | −2.30 | 73.18 | 1.69 | 74.87 | 1.32 | 76.19 | 0.56 | (Latvia) |
| Barbados | 76.18 | 73.63 | 78.61 | 4.98 | 76.50 | 0.15 | 76.65 | −0.07 | 76.58 | −0.90 | 75.68 | 0.50 | 76.18 | −0.32 | (Barbados) |
| Cabo Verde | 76.06 | 72.86 | 79.21 | 6.35 | 75.45 | −1.63 | 73.82 | 0.61 | 74.42 | 1.48 | 75.91 | 0.15 | 76.06 | 0.61 | (Cape Verde) |
| Mayotte | 76.05 | 74.09 | 78.33 | 4.25 | 76.10 | −1.89 | 74.21 | −1.39 | 72.82 | 2.30 | 75.13 | 0.93 | 76.05 | −0.05 | (Mayotte) |
| Lithuania | 76.03 | 71.22 | 80.67 | 9.46 | 76.42 | −1.32 | 75.11 | −0.81 | 74.30 | 0.40 | 74.70 | 1.33 | 76.03 | −0.40 | (Lithuania) |
| Romania | 75.94 | 72.40 | 79.56 | 7.16 | 75.33 | −1.28 | 74.05 | −1.31 | 72.74 | 2.52 | 75.26 | 0.68 | 75.94 | 0.61 | (Romania) |
| Brazil | 75.85 | 72.76 | 78.98 | 6.22 | 75.81 | −1.30 | 74.51 | −1.47 | 73.04 | 1.83 | 74.87 | 0.98 | 75.85 | 0.04 | (Brazil) |
| Armenia | 75.68 | 71.39 | 79.45 | 8.07 | 75.19 | −6.30 | 68.89 | 3.66 | 72.55 | 2.08 | 74.63 | 1.05 | 75.68 | 0.49 | (Armenia) |
| Bulgaria | 75.64 | 72.16 | 79.21 | 7.05 | 75.09 | −1.49 | 73.60 | −2.19 | 71.41 | 2.62 | 74.03 | 1.60 | 75.64 | 0.55 | (Bulgaria) |
| US Virgin Islands | 75.47 | 70.51 | 81.35 | 10.84 | 74.88 | −0.16 | 74.71 | −0.10 | 74.61 | 0.43 | 75.05 | 0.43 | 75.47 | 0.60 | (United States Virgin Islands) |
| Brunei | 75.33 | 73.33 | 77.56 | 4.23 | 75.05 | 0.07 | 75.11 | −0.24 | 74.87 | −1.95 | 72.92 | 2.41 | 75.33 | 0.28 | (Brunei) |
| Morocco | 75.31 | 73.17 | 77.60 | 4.43 | 74.25 | −1.11 | 73.13 | 0.25 | 73.39 | 1.78 | 75.16 | 0.15 | 75.31 | 1.07 | (Morocco) |
| Grenada | 75.20 | 72.36 | 78.36 | 6.00 | 74.97 | 0.05 | 75.02 | −0.50 | 74.52 | 0.63 | 75.15 | 0.05 | 75.20 | 0.23 | (Grenada) |
| Mexico | 75.07 | 72.24 | 77.81 | 5.57 | 74.53 | −4.08 | 70.45 | −0.70 | 69.75 | 4.22 | 73.97 | 1.10 | 75.07 | 0.54 | (Mexico) |
| Nicaragua | 74.95 | 72.31 | 77.42 | 5.11 | 73.76 | −3.00 | 70.77 | −0.29 | 70.48 | 3.98 | 74.46 | 0.48 | 74.95 | 1.18 | (Nicaragua) |
| Mauritius | 74.93 | 71.94 | 78.18 | 6.25 | 74.18 | 0.48 | 74.66 | −1.75 | 72.90 | 0.64 | 73.54 | 1.38 | 74.93 | 0.74 | (Mauritius) |
| Bangladesh | 74.67 | 73.03 | 76.37 | 3.34 | 72.62 | −1.20 | 71.42 | −0.32 | 71.10 | 3.16 | 74.27 | 0.41 | 74.67 | 2.05 | (Bangladesh) |
| Vietnam | 74.59 | 69.88 | 79.26 | 9.39 | 74.21 | 1.17 | 75.38 | −1.24 | 74.14 | 0.36 | 74.50 | 0.09 | 74.59 | 0.38 | (Vietnam) |
| Bahamas | 74.55 | 70.91 | 78.19 | 7.28 | 71.41 | 1.59 | 72.99 | −2.24 | 70.75 | 3.74 | 74.49 | 0.06 | 74.55 | 3.14 | (The Bahamas) |
| Georgia | 74.50 | 69.57 | 79.11 | 9.54 | 74.17 | −0.66 | 73.51 | −1.87 | 71.64 | 2.51 | 74.14 | 0.35 | 74.50 | 0.33 | (Georgia (country)) |
| Belarus | 74.43 | 69.53 | 79.06 | 9.53 | 74.25 | −1.99 | 72.27 | −0.05 | 72.22 | 2.14 | 74.36 | 0.07 | 74.43 | 0.18 | (Belarus) |
| Azerbaijan | 74.43 | 71.56 | 77.13 | 5.57 | 73.29 | −2.98 | 70.31 | 0.69 | 71.00 | 3.13 | 74.12 | 0.30 | 74.43 | 1.14 | (Azerbaijan) |
| Kazakhstan | 74.40 | 70.11 | 78.39 | 8.28 | 73.66 | −2.46 | 71.19 | −1.06 | 70.13 | 3.37 | 73.50 | 0.90 | 74.40 | 0.74 | (Kazakhstan) |
| Paraguay | 73.84 | 70.89 | 76.95 | 6.07 | 73.67 | −0.95 | 72.72 | −4.61 | 68.11 | 4.21 | 72.32 | 1.52 | 73.84 | 0.18 | (Paraguay) |
| Dominican Republic | 73.72 | 70.53 | 76.97 | 6.44 | 73.11 | −0.48 | 72.64 | −0.88 | 71.76 | 2.45 | 74.21 | −0.49 | 73.72 | 0.61 | (Dominican Republic) |
| North Korea | 73.64 | 71.46 | 75.74 | 4.29 | 72.93 | −0.14 | 72.78 | 0.65 | 73.44 | 0.20 | 73.64 | 0.00 | 73.64 | 0.71 | (North Korea) |
| Suriname | 73.63 | 70.46 | 76.83 | 6.38 | 71.77 | 0.55 | 72.32 | −3.38 | 68.94 | 4.31 | 73.25 | 0.38 | 73.63 | 1.86 | (Suriname) |
| Belize | 73.57 | 70.93 | 76.50 | 5.57 | 72.58 | −1.00 | 71.58 | −0.66 | 70.92 | 1.27 | 72.19 | 1.38 | 73.57 | 0.99 | (Belize) |
| Trinidad and Tobago | 73.49 | 70.38 | 76.68 | 6.30 | 72.84 | −0.19 | 72.64 | −1.53 | 71.11 | 2.22 | 73.33 | 0.16 | 73.49 | 0.65 | (Trinidad and Tobago) |
| Ukraine | 73.42 | 66.90 | 80.20 | 13.30 | 73.92 | −0.64 | 73.28 | −1.65 | 71.63 | 1.03 | 72.66 | 0.76 | 73.42 | −0.50 | (Ukraine) |
| World | 73.17 | 70.55 | 75.89 | 5.34 | 72.61 | −0.69 | 71.92 | −1.05 | 70.86 | 1.77 | 72.64 | 0.53 | 73.17 | 0.56 | |
| Russia | 73.15 | 67.26 | 79.04 | 11.78 | 73.07 | −1.90 | 71.17 | −1.36 | 69.81 | 2.71 | 72.52 | 0.64 | 73.15 | 0.09 | (Russia) |
| Bhutan | 72.97 | 71.31 | 74.97 | 3.66 | 72.00 | 0.25 | 72.25 | 0.20 | 72.45 | 0.31 | 72.75 | 0.22 | 72.97 | 0.97 | (Bhutan) |
| Tonga | 72.89 | 69.37 | 76.41 | 7.04 | 72.29 | 0.09 | 72.38 | −0.25 | 72.13 | 0.51 | 72.64 | 0.26 | 72.89 | 0.60 | (Tonga) |
| Honduras | 72.88 | 70.35 | 75.50 | 5.16 | 72.12 | −1.26 | 70.86 | −1.37 | 69.49 | 3.22 | 72.72 | 0.17 | 72.88 | 0.76 | (Honduras) |
| Seychelles | 72.86 | 69.94 | 76.52 | 6.58 | 72.12 | 1.97 | 74.09 | −2.87 | 71.22 | 0.03 | 71.25 | 1.61 | 72.86 | 0.74 | (Seychelles) |
| Saint Lucia | 72.70 | 69.31 | 76.30 | 6.99 | 72.25 | 0.06 | 72.31 | −3.19 | 69.12 | 3.55 | 72.67 | 0.03 | 72.70 | 0.45 | (Saint Lucia) |
| Guatemala | 72.60 | 70.31 | 74.88 | 4.57 | 71.64 | −1.67 | 69.97 | −2.11 | 67.86 | 3.35 | 71.21 | 1.40 | 72.60 | 0.96 | (Guatemala) |
| Venezuela | 72.51 | 68.72 | 76.50 | 7.78 | 72.77 | −0.40 | 72.37 | −0.83 | 71.54 | 1.03 | 72.57 | −0.05 | 72.51 | −0.25 | (Venezuela) |
| Uzbekistan | 72.39 | 69.45 | 75.40 | 5.95 | 72.09 | −0.63 | 71.46 | 0.22 | 71.68 | 0.47 | 72.15 | 0.24 | 72.39 | 0.29 | (Uzbekistan) |
| Iraq | 72.32 | 70.43 | 74.06 | 3.63 | 71.25 | −1.59 | 69.65 | 1.05 | 70.70 | 1.33 | 72.04 | 0.29 | 72.32 | 1.08 | (Iraq) |
| Syria | 72.12 | 69.83 | 74.41 | 4.58 | 70.97 | 0.97 | 71.94 | 0.47 | 72.42 | 0.37 | 72.79 | −0.67 | 72.12 | 1.15 | (Syria) |
| El Salvador | 72.10 | 67.52 | 76.26 | 8.74 | 71.72 | −1.48 | 70.24 | −0.30 | 69.94 | 2.03 | 71.97 | 0.13 | 72.10 | 0.37 | (El Salvador) |
| India | 72.00 | 70.52 | 73.60 | 3.08 | 70.75 | −0.59 | 70.16 | −2.87 | 67.28 | 4.42 | 71.70 | 0.30 | 72.00 | 1.26 | (India) |
| Tajikistan | 71.79 | 69.57 | 73.98 | 4.40 | 70.96 | −2.36 | 68.61 | 0.99 | 69.59 | 1.97 | 71.56 | 0.23 | 71.79 | 0.83 | (Tajikistan) |
| Mongolia | 71.73 | 67.24 | 76.43 | 9.19 | 70.66 | −0.63 | 70.03 | −1.46 | 68.56 | 2.94 | 71.50 | 0.23 | 71.73 | 1.07 | (Mongolia) |
| Samoa | 71.70 | 69.86 | 73.66 | 3.80 | 70.27 | 0.46 | 70.73 | 0.37 | 71.10 | 0.45 | 71.55 | 0.15 | 71.70 | 1.43 | (Samoa) |
| Kyrgyzstan | 71.68 | 68.18 | 75.25 | 7.07 | 70.89 | −1.75 | 69.14 | 0.15 | 69.29 | 2.20 | 71.49 | 0.19 | 71.68 | 0.79 | (Kyrgyzstan) |
| Egypt | 71.63 | 69.49 | 73.81 | 4.32 | 71.21 | −1.42 | 69.79 | −0.81 | 68.98 | 2.03 | 71.01 | 0.62 | 71.63 | 0.42 | (Egypt) |
| Jamaica | 71.48 | 68.97 | 73.99 | 5.02 | 71.53 | −0.08 | 71.45 | −2.37 | 69.08 | 2.40 | 71.48 | 0.00 | 71.48 | −0.05 | (Jamaica) |
| Vanuatu | 71.48 | 69.44 | 73.93 | 4.48 | 70.78 | −0.40 | 70.39 | −0.43 | 69.95 | 1.35 | 71.30 | 0.17 | 71.48 | 0.69 | (Vanuatu) |
| Western Sahara | 71.39 | 69.69 | 73.55 | 3.86 | 70.38 | 0.23 | 70.61 | 0.27 | 70.89 | 0.26 | 71.14 | 0.24 | 71.39 | 1.00 | (Western Sahara) |
| Saint Vincent and the Grenadines | 71.23 | 68.66 | 74.31 | 5.65 | 70.99 | −1.39 | 69.61 | −0.47 | 69.13 | 2.06 | 71.19 | 0.04 | 71.23 | 0.24 | (Saint Vincent and the Grenadines) |
| Moldova | 71.20 | 66.57 | 75.53 | 8.97 | 70.18 | −0.27 | 69.91 | −0.92 | 68.99 | 2.56 | 71.55 | −0.35 | 71.20 | 1.02 | (Moldova) |
| Indonesia | 71.15 | 69.04 | 73.27 | 4.23 | 70.35 | −1.53 | 68.82 | −1.36 | 67.45 | 3.47 | 70.92 | 0.22 | 71.15 | 0.80 | (Indonesia) |
| Dominica | 71.13 | 68.21 | 74.55 | 6.33 | 71.31 | −0.04 | 71.27 | −1.44 | 69.83 | 1.25 | 71.08 | 0.05 | 71.13 | −0.17 | (Dominica) |
| Cambodia | 70.67 | 68.01 | 73.19 | 5.18 | 70.13 | −0.07 | 70.06 | −0.76 | 69.30 | 1.23 | 70.53 | 0.14 | 70.67 | 0.54 | (Cambodia) |
| Solomon Islands | 70.53 | 69.22 | 71.98 | 2.77 | 69.98 | −0.72 | 69.26 | −0.37 | 68.89 | 1.52 | 70.41 | 0.12 | 70.53 | 0.55 | (Solomon Islands) |
| Nepal | 70.35 | 68.83 | 71.84 | 3.00 | 69.30 | −0.19 | 69.11 | −0.72 | 68.39 | 1.70 | 70.09 | 0.27 | 70.35 | 1.05 | (Nepal) |
| Guyana | 70.18 | 66.51 | 73.94 | 7.44 | 69.07 | −1.32 | 67.75 | −3.43 | 64.32 | 5.57 | 69.89 | 0.29 | 70.18 | 1.11 | (Guyana) |
| Turkmenistan | 70.07 | 66.87 | 72.84 | 5.97 | 69.41 | −0.56 | 68.85 | 0.51 | 69.35 | 0.56 | 69.91 | 0.16 | 70.07 | 0.67 | (Turkmenistan) |
| Greenland | 70.06 | 68.09 | 72.44 | 4.35 | 70.26 | −0.10 | 70.16 | −0.11 | 70.05 | 0.00 | 70.05 | 0.00 | 70.06 | −0.20 | (Greenland) |
| Philippines | 69.83 | 66.89 | 72.82 | 5.93 | 69.68 | 0.42 | 70.10 | −3.42 | 66.67 | 2.80 | 69.47 | 0.36 | 69.83 | 0.15 | (Philippines) |
| Sao Tome and Principe | 69.72 | 66.24 | 73.73 | 7.49 | 68.04 | −0.06 | 67.98 | 0.05 | 68.03 | 1.21 | 69.24 | 0.48 | 69.72 | 1.68 | (São Tomé and Príncipe) |
| Libya | 69.34 | 68.27 | 70.42 | 2.15 | 72.94 | −0.55 | 72.39 | −0.33 | 72.06 | 2.40 | 74.46 | −5.12 | 69.34 | −3.60 | (Libya) |
| Yemen | 69.30 | 67.23 | 71.39 | 4.15 | 66.57 | −0.13 | 66.44 | −0.42 | 66.02 | 1.93 | 67.95 | 1.34 | 69.30 | 2.73 | (Yemen) |
| Botswana | 69.16 | 66.67 | 71.70 | 5.03 | 67.17 | 0.48 | 67.64 | −4.34 | 63.30 | 5.45 | 68.75 | 0.41 | 69.16 | 2.00 | (Botswana) |
| Laos | 68.96 | 66.78 | 71.25 | 4.47 | 67.91 | 0.43 | 68.34 | −0.53 | 67.81 | 0.91 | 68.72 | 0.25 | 68.96 | 1.05 | (Laos) |
| Senegal | 68.68 | 66.79 | 70.75 | 3.96 | 67.67 | −0.17 | 67.50 | −0.63 | 66.87 | 0.92 | 67.79 | 0.90 | 68.68 | 1.01 | (Senegal) |
| Eritrea | 68.62 | 66.51 | 70.66 | 4.15 | 67.31 | −0.33 | 66.98 | −0.04 | 66.94 | 0.85 | 67.79 | 0.83 | 68.62 | 1.32 | (Eritrea) |
| Bolivia | 68.58 | 66.13 | 71.14 | 5.02 | 67.82 | −4.91 | 62.91 | −1.48 | 61.43 | 6.01 | 67.43 | 1.15 | 68.58 | 0.76 | (Bolivia) |
| Mauritania | 68.48 | 66.50 | 70.48 | 3.98 | 67.64 | −0.85 | 66.79 | −0.03 | 66.76 | 1.52 | 68.28 | 0.20 | 68.48 | 0.84 | (Mauritania) |
| Gabon | 68.34 | 65.91 | 71.05 | 5.15 | 67.34 | −0.26 | 67.07 | 0.00 | 67.07 | 0.64 | 67.71 | 0.62 | 68.34 | 1.00 | (Gabon) |
| Uganda | 68.25 | 65.27 | 71.12 | 5.85 | 66.35 | 0.06 | 66.41 | 0.04 | 66.45 | 1.23 | 67.67 | 0.58 | 68.25 | 1.90 | (Uganda) |
| Rwanda | 67.78 | 65.49 | 69.89 | 4.39 | 66.69 | 0.26 | 66.95 | −0.10 | 66.85 | 0.68 | 67.53 | 0.26 | 67.78 | 1.09 | (Rwanda) |
| Timor-Leste | 67.69 | 66.07 | 69.44 | 3.37 | 66.50 | 0.42 | 66.92 | −0.72 | 66.20 | 1.17 | 67.37 | 0.32 | 67.69 | 1.19 | (Timor-Leste) |
| Pakistan | 67.65 | 65.33 | 70.16 | 4.83 | 66.73 | −1.03 | 65.70 | 0.07 | 65.77 | 1.64 | 67.42 | 0.23 | 67.65 | 0.92 | (Pakistan) |
| Namibia | 67.39 | 63.33 | 71.34 | 8.01 | 63.55 | 0.53 | 64.07 | −3.22 | 60.85 | 3.34 | 64.19 | 3.19 | 67.39 | 3.84 | (Namibia) |
| Malawi | 67.35 | 64.07 | 70.56 | 6.49 | 65.00 | 0.22 | 65.22 | −0.43 | 64.78 | 1.25 | 66.04 | 1.32 | 67.35 | 2.36 | (Malawi) |
| Fiji | 67.32 | 65.34 | 69.36 | 4.02 | 67.01 | −0.09 | 66.92 | −2.02 | 64.90 | 2.24 | 67.15 | 0.17 | 67.32 | 0.31 | (Fiji) |
| Ethiopia | 67.31 | 64.08 | 70.73 | 6.65 | 65.74 | 0.23 | 65.97 | −0.64 | 65.33 | 1.57 | 66.90 | 0.42 | 67.31 | 1.57 | (Ethiopia) |
| F.S. Micronesia | 67.20 | 63.49 | 71.12 | 7.63 | 66.20 | −0.32 | 65.88 | 0.27 | 66.15 | 0.81 | 66.96 | 0.24 | 67.20 | 1.00 | (Federated States of Micronesia) |
| Tanzania | 67.00 | 64.20 | 69.78 | 5.58 | 66.01 | 0.76 | 66.77 | −0.64 | 66.13 | 0.75 | 66.88 | 0.12 | 67.00 | 0.99 | (Tanzania) |
| Myanmar | 66.89 | 63.79 | 70.16 | 6.37 | 66.46 | 0.15 | 66.61 | −1.06 | 65.55 | 0.95 | 66.51 | 0.38 | 66.89 | 0.43 | (Myanmar) |
| Comoros | 66.78 | 64.79 | 68.93 | 4.15 | 65.66 | 0.09 | 65.76 | −0.56 | 65.20 | 1.28 | 66.48 | 0.30 | 66.78 | 1.11 | (Comoros) |
| Kiribati | 66.47 | 64.58 | 68.17 | 3.59 | 65.87 | −0.66 | 65.20 | −1.06 | 64.15 | 2.12 | 66.27 | 0.20 | 66.47 | 0.61 | (Kiribati) |
| Zambia | 66.35 | 63.94 | 68.67 | 4.74 | 62.91 | 0.45 | 63.36 | −1.00 | 62.36 | 2.92 | 65.28 | 1.07 | 66.35 | 3.44 | (Zambia) |
| Sudan | 66.33 | 63.27 | 69.63 | 6.35 | 65.80 | −0.68 | 65.12 | −0.66 | 64.46 | 1.24 | 65.69 | 0.64 | 66.33 | 0.53 | (Sudan) |
| South Africa | 66.14 | 62.61 | 69.60 | 6.99 | 66.07 | −0.92 | 65.15 | −3.14 | 62.01 | 3.44 | 65.45 | 0.69 | 66.14 | 0.07 | (South Africa) |
| Papua New Guinea | 66.13 | 63.74 | 69.08 | 5.35 | 65.33 | −0.26 | 65.08 | −0.72 | 64.36 | 0.92 | 65.27 | 0.86 | 66.13 | 0.80 | (Papua New Guinea) |
| Afghanistan | 66.03 | 64.47 | 67.54 | 3.07 | 62.94 | −1.49 | 61.45 | −1.04 | 60.42 | 5.20 | 65.62 | 0.42 | 66.03 | 3.09 | (Afghanistan) |
| Djibouti | 65.99 | 63.52 | 68.51 | 4.99 | 64.38 | −0.18 | 64.20 | −0.37 | 63.83 | 1.71 | 65.54 | 0.45 | 65.99 | 1.61 | (Djibouti) |
| Gambia | 65.86 | 64.17 | 67.53 | 3.36 | 64.43 | −0.01 | 64.42 | −0.57 | 63.85 | 1.01 | 64.86 | 1.00 | 65.86 | 1.43 | (The Gambia) |
| Congo, Rep. | 65.77 | 64.12 | 67.46 | 3.34 | 63.15 | 1.24 | 64.39 | −0.20 | 64.19 | 0.81 | 65.00 | 0.77 | 65.77 | 2.62 | (Republic of the Congo) |
| Ghana | 65.50 | 63.13 | 67.94 | 4.81 | 64.45 | −0.15 | 64.31 | −0.02 | 64.29 | 0.96 | 65.25 | 0.25 | 65.50 | 1.04 | (Ghana) |
| Palestine | 65.17 | 59.69 | 71.50 | 11.81 | 75.81 | −0.81 | 75.00 | −1.11 | 73.89 | 2.77 | 76.66 | −11.49 | 65.17 | −10.64 | (Palestine) |
| Haiti | 64.94 | 61.73 | 68.30 | 6.57 | 64.33 | −0.56 | 63.77 | −1.16 | 62.61 | 1.33 | 63.95 | 0.99 | 64.94 | 0.61 | (Haiti) |
| Angola | 64.62 | 62.10 | 67.14 | 5.04 | 63.05 | 0.07 | 63.12 | −0.16 | 62.96 | 1.29 | 64.25 | 0.37 | 64.62 | 1.57 | (Angola) |
| Eswatini | 64.12 | 61.19 | 66.95 | 5.77 | 59.85 | 0.01 | 59.86 | −1.63 | 58.23 | 4.80 | 63.03 | 1.09 | 64.12 | 4.27 | (Eswatini) |
| Guinea-Bissau | 64.08 | 61.66 | 66.36 | 4.71 | 62.16 | −0.82 | 61.34 | 0.31 | 61.65 | 1.95 | 63.60 | 0.48 | 64.08 | 1.92 | (Guinea-Bissau) |
| Equatorial Guinea | 63.71 | 62.04 | 65.66 | 3.62 | 62.30 | −0.16 | 62.14 | 0.31 | 62.45 | 0.91 | 63.35 | 0.35 | 63.71 | 1.41 | (Equatorial Guinea) |
| Cameroon | 63.70 | 61.52 | 65.94 | 4.42 | 61.70 | −0.02 | 61.67 | −0.53 | 61.15 | 1.30 | 62.44 | 1.26 | 63.70 | 2.00 | (Cameroon) |
| Burundi | 63.65 | 61.60 | 65.70 | 4.10 | 62.18 | 0.39 | 62.57 | −0.47 | 62.10 | 0.78 | 62.88 | 0.77 | 63.65 | 1.47 | (Burundi) |
| Kenya | 63.65 | 61.46 | 65.92 | 4.46 | 62.94 | −1.34 | 61.60 | −0.37 | 61.23 | 2.32 | 63.55 | 0.10 | 63.65 | 0.71 | (Kenya) |
| Madagascar | 63.63 | 61.94 | 65.38 | 3.44 | 63.50 | −0.80 | 62.71 | −0.19 | 62.52 | 0.55 | 63.07 | 0.56 | 63.63 | 0.13 | (Madagascar) |
| Mozambique | 63.61 | 60.30 | 66.54 | 6.24 | 61.31 | 0.08 | 61.39 | −1.12 | 60.27 | 2.74 | 63.01 | 0.60 | 63.61 | 2.31 | (Mozambique) |
| Zimbabwe | 62.77 | 60.23 | 65.01 | 4.79 | 61.06 | 0.47 | 61.53 | −1.40 | 60.13 | 2.23 | 62.36 | 0.41 | 62.77 | 1.72 | (Zimbabwe) |
| Togo | 62.74 | 62.54 | 62.92 | 0.39 | 61.05 | 0.07 | 61.12 | 0.20 | 61.33 | 0.96 | 62.29 | 0.45 | 62.74 | 1.68 | (Togo) |
| Liberia | 62.16 | 60.88 | 63.44 | 2.57 | 61.23 | 0.04 | 61.27 | −0.10 | 61.17 | 0.77 | 61.93 | 0.23 | 62.16 | 0.93 | (Liberia) |
| Cote d'Ivoire | 61.94 | 60.02 | 64.13 | 4.12 | 60.27 | −0.13 | 60.14 | 0.15 | 60.29 | 1.27 | 61.56 | 0.38 | 61.94 | 1.67 | (Ivory Coast) |
| DR Congo | 61.90 | 59.79 | 64.04 | 4.25 | 60.24 | 0.19 | 60.43 | −0.38 | 60.04 | 0.94 | 60.98 | 0.92 | 61.90 | 1.65 | (Democratic Republic of the Congo) |
| Sierra Leone | 61.79 | 60.06 | 63.50 | 3.44 | 59.59 | 0.10 | 59.69 | 0.57 | 60.26 | 1.01 | 61.27 | 0.51 | 61.79 | 2.19 | (Sierra Leone) |
| Niger | 61.18 | 60.26 | 62.13 | 1.87 | 60.03 | −0.14 | 59.89 | −0.35 | 59.54 | 0.86 | 60.40 | 0.79 | 61.18 | 1.15 | (Niger) |
| Burkina Faso | 61.09 | 58.92 | 63.22 | 4.30 | 60.18 | 0.27 | 60.45 | −0.41 | 60.05 | 0.65 | 60.70 | 0.39 | 61.09 | 0.91 | (Burkina Faso) |
| Benin | 60.77 | 59.35 | 62.21 | 2.86 | 59.89 | 0.27 | 60.15 | −0.54 | 59.61 | 0.86 | 60.48 | 0.30 | 60.77 | 0.89 | (Benin) |
| Guinea | 60.74 | 59.52 | 61.90 | 2.38 | 59.38 | −0.03 | 59.35 | 0.02 | 59.37 | 1.06 | 60.43 | 0.31 | 60.74 | 1.36 | (Guinea) |
| Mali | 60.44 | 59.04 | 61.90 | 2.86 | 59.22 | −0.36 | 58.86 | 0.26 | 59.12 | 0.92 | 60.03 | 0.40 | 60.44 | 1.22 | (Mali) |
| Somalia | 58.82 | 56.35 | 61.39 | 5.04 | 57.25 | −0.15 | 57.09 | −1.39 | 55.70 | −1.77 | 53.93 | 4.88 | 58.82 | 1.57 | (Somalia) |
| South Sudan | 57.62 | 54.64 | 60.63 | 5.99 | 58.13 | −0.48 | 57.65 | −0.60 | 57.05 | 0.16 | 57.20 | 0.41 | 57.62 | −0.51 | (South Sudan) |
| CAR | 57.41 | 55.26 | 59.29 | 4.03 | 31.53 | 19.07 | 50.60 | −10.32 | 40.28 | −21.46 | 18.82 | 38.59 | 57.41 | 25.88 | (Central African Republic) |
| Lesotho | 57.38 | 54.62 | 60.01 | 5.39 | 55.25 | −0.12 | 55.13 | −0.92 | 54.21 | 2.60 | 56.81 | 0.56 | 57.38 | 2.13 | (Lesotho) |
| Chad | 55.07 | 53.20 | 57.01 | 3.82 | 52.99 | 0.09 | 53.08 | 0.05 | 53.14 | 1.39 | 54.53 | 0.54 | 55.07 | 2.08 | (Chad) |
| Nigeria | 54.46 | 54.18 | 54.74 | 0.57 | 53.01 | 0.06 | 53.07 | 0.38 | 53.45 | 0.62 | 54.08 | 0.38 | 54.46 | 1.45 | (Nigeria) |

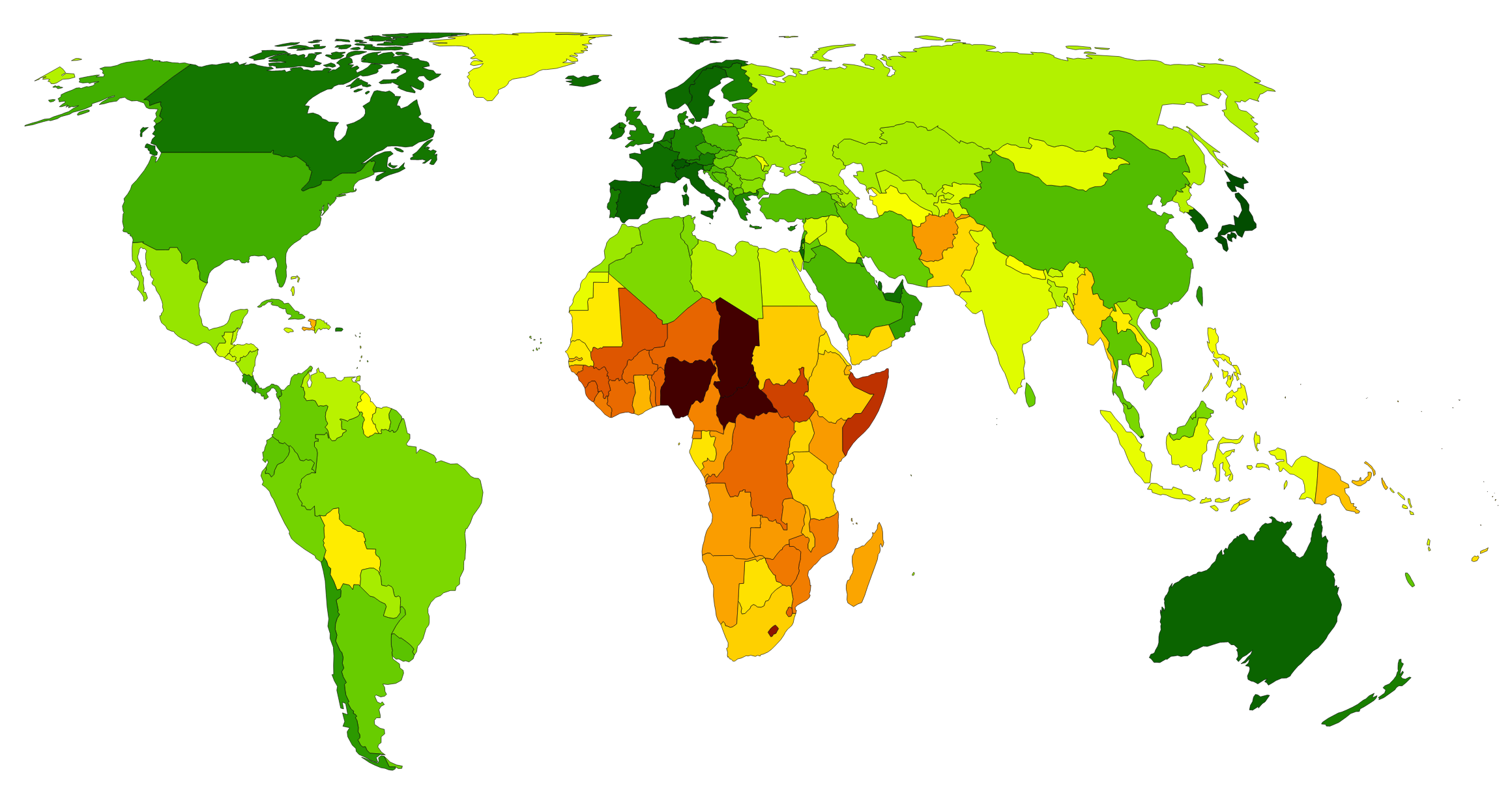
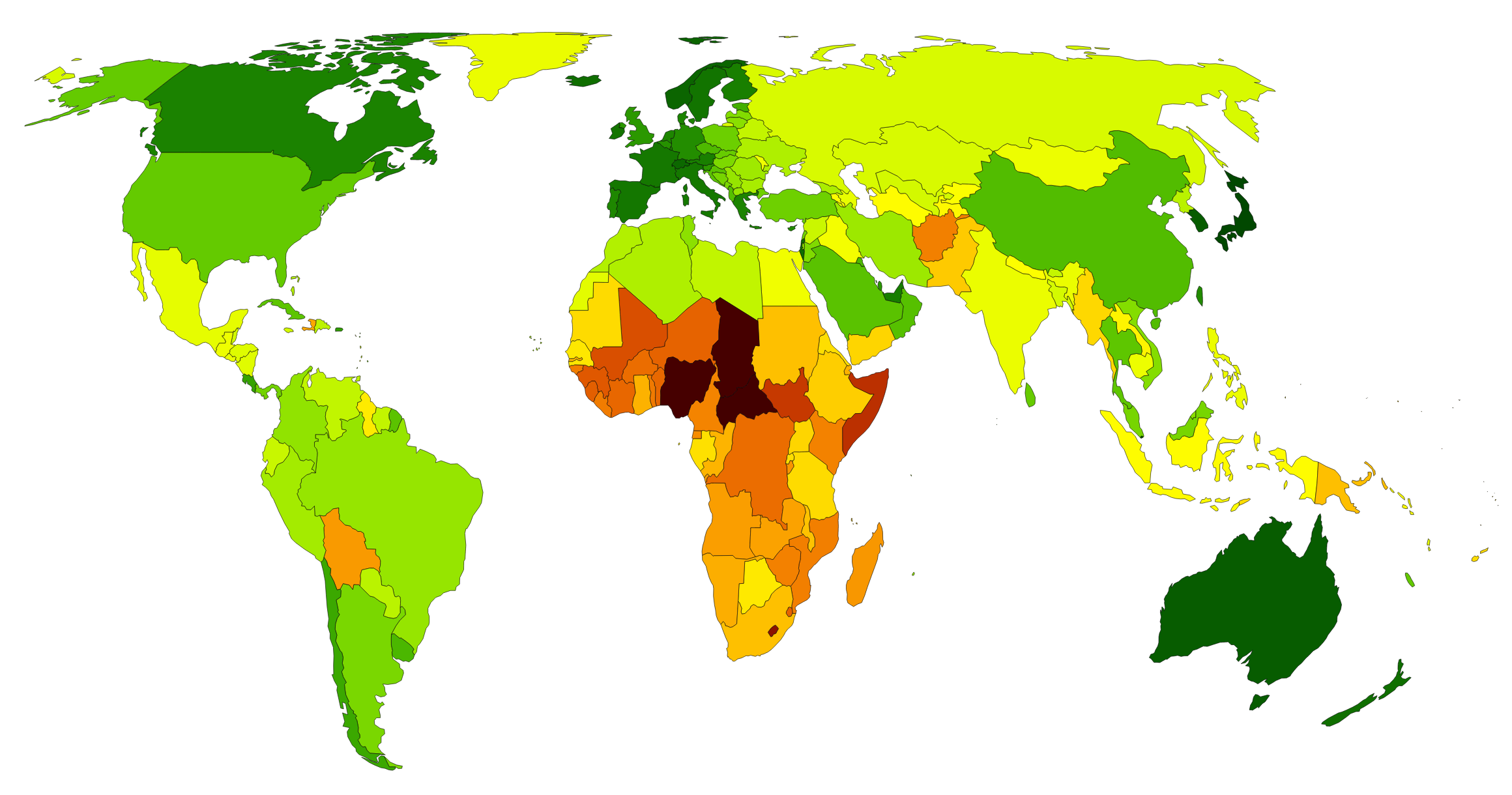
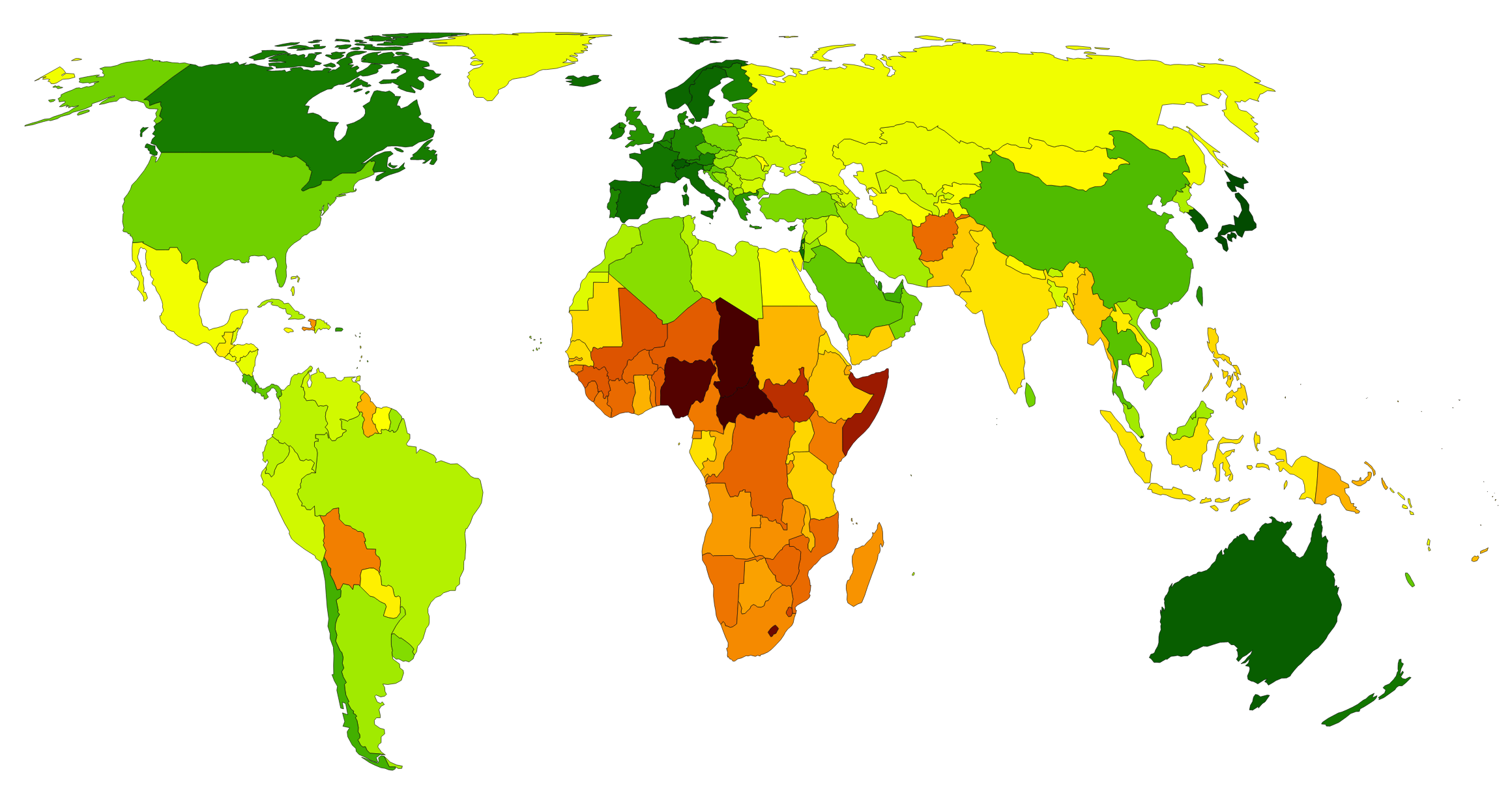
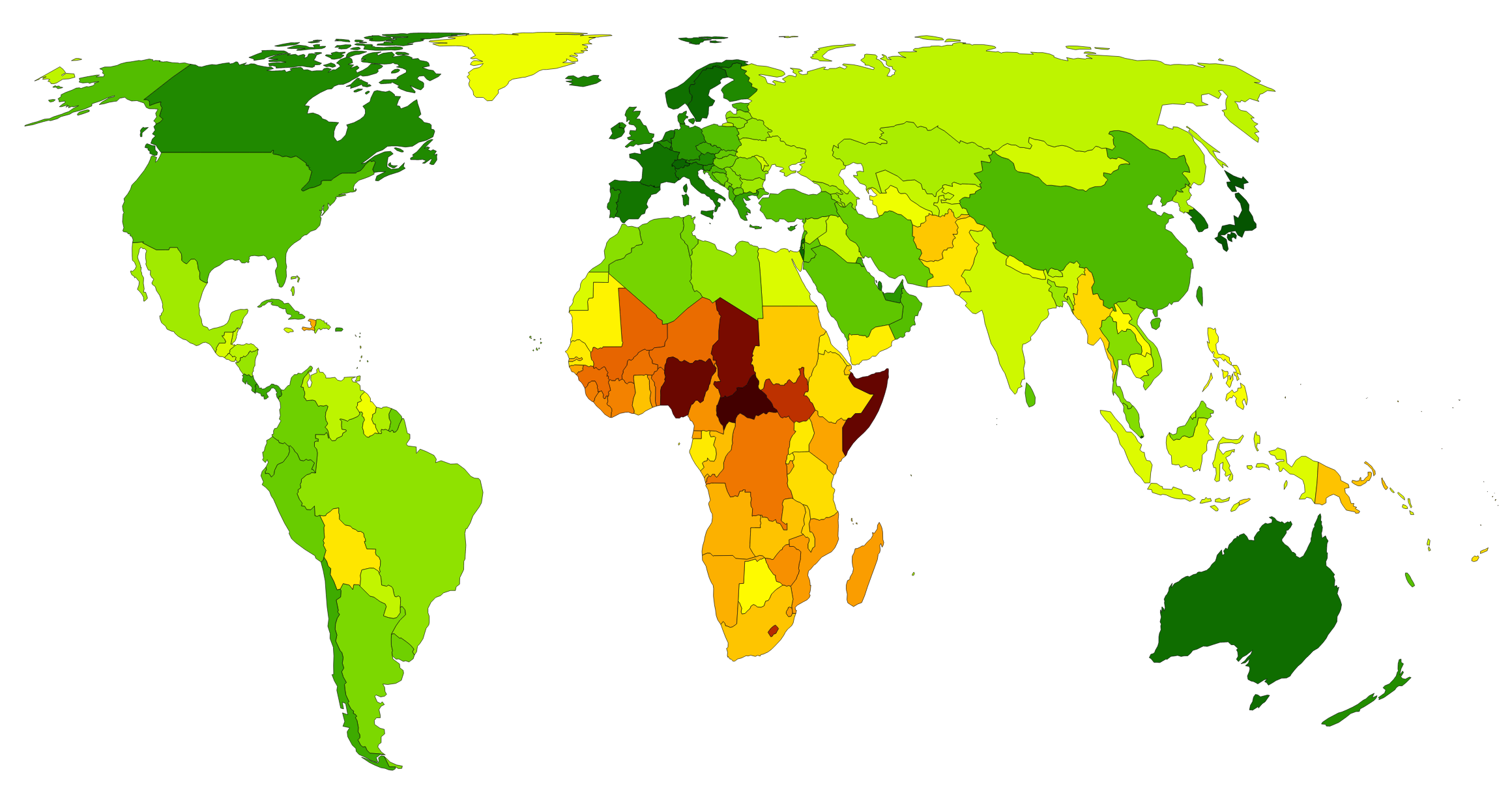
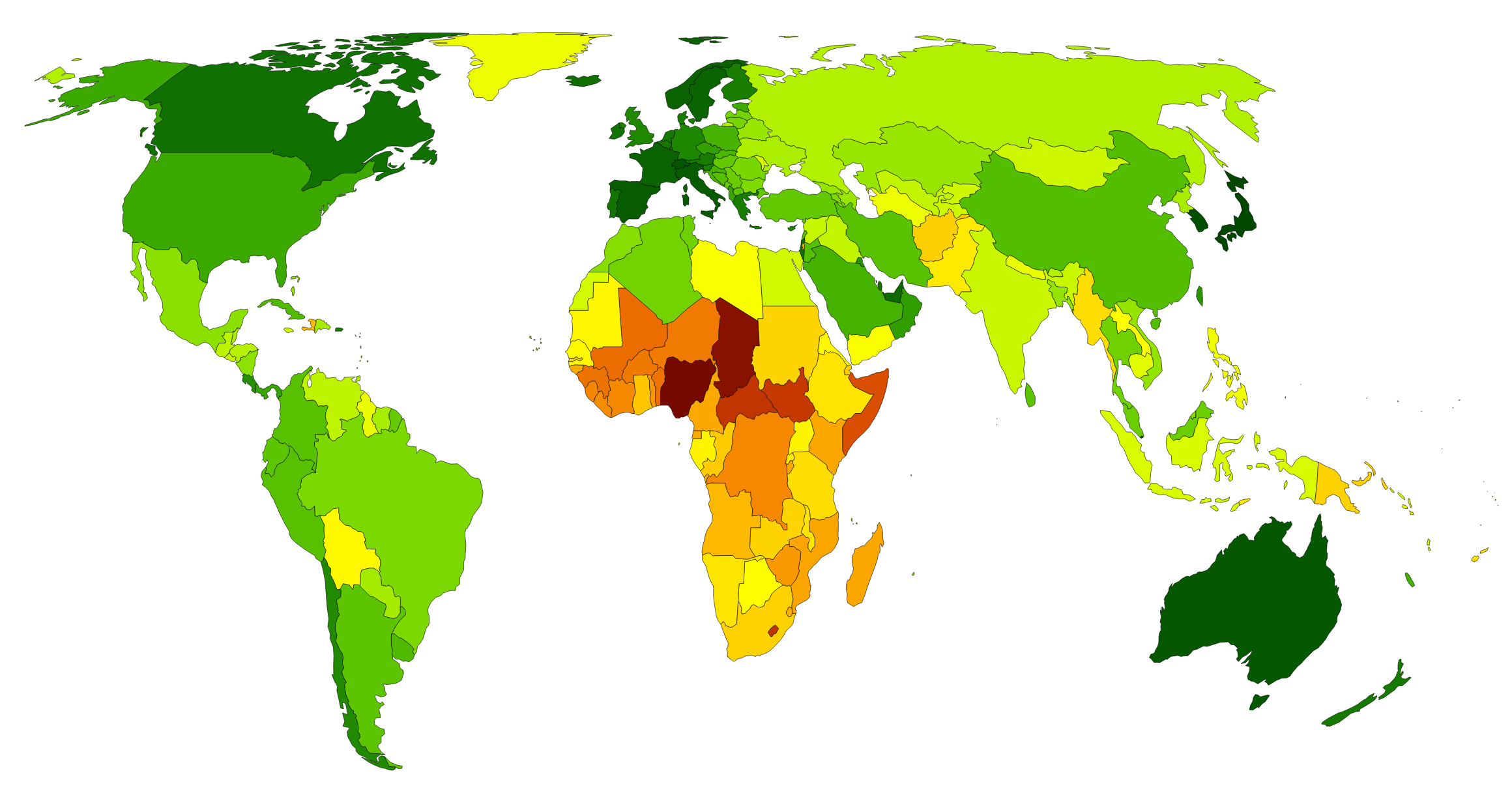
Change of life expectancy in 2019-2023, according to estimate of the UN, a smooth palette

== World Bank Group (2024) ==
Estimation of the World Bank Group for 2024. Only countries with populations over 50,000 are listed. Due to this criterion, the table does not include such countries as Monaco (LE 86.50 years, population 39,000), San Marino (LE 85.82 years, population 34,000), and Liechtenstein (LE 84.20 years, population 41,000). The values in the World Bank Group tables are rounded. All calculations were done on raw data, therefore, due to the nuances of rounding, in some places illusory inconsistencies of indicators arose, with a size of 0.01 year.

World Bank Group (2024)
| Countries and territories | 2024 | | | | Historical data | | | | | | | | | | | | | recovery from COVID-19: 2019→2024 | |
| Countries and territories | All | Male | Female | Sex gap | 2014 | 2014 →2019 | 2019 | 2019 →2020 | 2020 | 2020 →2021 | 2021 | 2021 →2022 | 2022 | 2022 →2023 | 2023 | 2023 →2024 | 2024 | recovery from COVID-19: 2019→2024 | |
|---|---|---|---|---|---|---|---|---|---|---|---|---|---|---|---|---|---|---|---|
| Hong Kong SAR, China | 85.39 | 82.70 | 88.22 | 5.52 | 83.94 | 1.22 | 85.16 | 0.34 | 85.50 | 0.04 | 85.53 | −1.87 | 83.66 | 1.59 | 85.25 | 0.15 | 85.39 | 0.24 | (Hong Kong) |
| Kuwait | 84.58 | 83.80 | 85.40 | 1.60 | 79.08 | 2.89 | 81.97 | −3.21 | 78.76 | −0.02 | 78.74 | 1.85 | 80.59 | 2.60 | 83.19 | 1.39 | 84.58 | 2.61 | (Kuwait) |
| Switzerland | 84.41 | 82.70 | 86.20 | 3.50 | 83.20 | 0.71 | 83.90 | −0.90 | 83.00 | 0.75 | 83.75 | −0.15 | 83.60 | 0.55 | 84.16 | 0.25 | 84.41 | 0.50 | (Switzerland) |
| French Polynesia | 84.19 | 81.90 | 86.62 | 4.72 | 82.15 | 1.04 | 83.19 | −0.74 | 82.46 | −2.89 | 79.57 | 4.29 | 83.86 | 0.21 | 84.07 | 0.12 | 84.19 | 1.00 | (French Polynesia) |
| Andorra | 84.19 | 82.26 | 86.24 | 3.98 | 84.48 | −0.39 | 84.10 | −4.68 | 79.42 | 2.91 | 82.33 | 1.69 | 84.02 | 0.02 | 84.04 | 0.15 | 84.19 | 0.09 | (Andorra) |
| Sweden | 84.06 | 82.60 | 85.60 | 3.00 | 82.25 | 0.86 | 83.11 | −0.75 | 82.36 | 0.70 | 83.06 | 0.00 | 83.06 | 0.25 | 83.31 | 0.75 | 84.06 | 0.95 | (Sweden) |
| Japan | 84.04 | 81.09 | 87.13 | 6.04 | 83.59 | 0.77 | 84.36 | 0.20 | 84.56 | −0.11 | 84.45 | −0.45 | 84.00 | 0.04 | 84.04 | 0.00 | 84.04 | −0.32 | (Japan) |
| Italy | 83.95 | 82.00 | 86.00 | 4.00 | 83.09 | 0.41 | 83.50 | −1.30 | 82.20 | 0.45 | 82.65 | 0.05 | 82.70 | 0.65 | 83.35 | 0.60 | 83.95 | 0.45 | (Italy) |
| Spain | 83.89 | 81.40 | 86.50 | 5.10 | 83.23 | 0.60 | 83.83 | −1.60 | 82.23 | 0.95 | 83.18 | −0.04 | 83.13 | 0.80 | 83.93 | −0.05 | 83.89 | 0.06 | (Spain) |
| South Korea | 83.63 | 80.80 | 86.60 | 5.80 | 81.72 | 1.50 | 83.23 | 0.20 | 83.43 | 0.10 | 83.53 | −0.85 | 82.68 | 0.75 | 83.43 | 0.20 | 83.63 | 0.40 | (South Korea) |
| Singapore | 83.35 | 81.20 | 85.60 | 4.40 | 82.50 | 1.10 | 83.60 | −0.05 | 83.54 | −0.45 | 83.09 | −0.20 | 82.90 | 0.20 | 83.10 | 0.25 | 83.35 | −0.25 | (Singapore) |
| Macao SAR, China | 83.33 | 80.60 | 86.20 | 5.60 | 83.02 | 0.91 | 83.93 | 0.20 | 84.13 | −0.40 | 83.73 | −0.65 | 83.08 | 0.10 | 83.18 | 0.15 | 83.33 | −0.60 | (Macau) |
| Israel | 83.20 | 81.10 | 85.40 | 4.30 | 82.15 | 0.65 | 82.80 | −0.16 | 82.65 | −0.15 | 82.50 | 0.20 | 82.70 | 0.50 | 83.20 | 0.00 | 83.20 | 0.39 | (Israel) |
| Luxembourg | 83.20 | 81.00 | 85.50 | 4.50 | 82.23 | 0.41 | 82.64 | −0.50 | 82.14 | 0.45 | 82.60 | 0.35 | 82.95 | 0.36 | 83.31 | −0.11 | 83.20 | 0.56 | (Luxembourg) |
| Norway | 83.16 | 81.60 | 84.80 | 3.20 | 82.10 | 0.86 | 82.96 | 0.25 | 83.21 | −0.05 | 83.16 | −0.65 | 82.51 | 0.50 | 83.01 | 0.15 | 83.16 | 0.20 | (Norway) |
| Faroe Islands | 83.08 | 81.34 | 84.91 | 3.58 | 81.59 | 0.80 | 82.39 | 0.14 | 82.53 | 0.14 | 82.68 | 0.14 | 82.82 | 0.14 | 82.95 | 0.13 | 83.08 | 0.69 | (Faroe Islands) |
| United Arab Emirates | 83.07 | 82.17 | 84.32 | 2.15 | 81.99 | 0.61 | 82.60 | −0.66 | 81.94 | −2.85 | 79.08 | 1.40 | 80.49 | 2.42 | 82.91 | 0.16 | 83.07 | 0.47 | (United Arab Emirates) |
| Australia | 83.05 | 81.10 | 85.10 | 4.00 | 82.30 | 0.60 | 82.90 | 0.30 | 83.20 | 0.10 | 83.30 | −0.10 | 83.20 | −0.15 | 83.05 | 0.00 | 83.05 | 0.15 | (Australia) |
| Ireland | 83.01 | 81.40 | 84.70 | 3.30 | 81.35 | 1.35 | 82.70 | −0.25 | 82.46 | −0.20 | 82.25 | 0.26 | 82.51 | 0.30 | 82.81 | 0.20 | 83.01 | 0.31 | (Republic of Ireland) |
| France | 82.98 | 80.20 | 85.90 | 5.70 | 82.72 | 0.11 | 82.83 | −0.65 | 82.18 | 0.15 | 82.32 | −0.20 | 82.13 | 0.70 | 82.83 | 0.15 | 82.98 | 0.15 | (France) |
| Malta | 82.96 | 81.20 | 84.80 | 3.60 | 81.90 | 0.76 | 82.66 | −0.56 | 82.10 | 0.16 | 82.26 | 0.04 | 82.30 | 1.06 | 83.36 | −0.40 | 82.96 | 0.30 | (Malta) |
| Iceland | 82.81 | 81.20 | 84.50 | 3.30 | 82.86 | 0.30 | 83.16 | −0.10 | 83.06 | 0.10 | 83.17 | −1.05 | 82.12 | 0.34 | 82.46 | 0.35 | 82.81 | −0.35 | (Iceland) |
| Qatar | 82.52 | 81.78 | 83.48 | 1.70 | 81.39 | 1.55 | 82.94 | −2.54 | 80.41 | 0.67 | 81.08 | 0.77 | 81.86 | 0.51 | 82.37 | 0.15 | 82.52 | −0.42 | (Qatar) |
| Bermuda | 82.49 | 79.06 | 85.87 | 6.81 | 80.20 | 1.05 | 81.25 | 0.20 | 81.46 | 0.29 | 81.75 | 0.32 | 82.06 | 0.25 | 82.31 | 0.18 | 82.49 | 1.24 | (Bermuda) |
| Portugal | 82.38 | 79.70 | 85.20 | 5.50 | 81.12 | 0.55 | 81.68 | −0.35 | 81.33 | 0.05 | 81.38 | 0.25 | 81.63 | 0.70 | 82.33 | 0.05 | 82.38 | 0.71 | (Portugal) |
| Finland | 82.34 | 79.80 | 85.00 | 5.20 | 81.18 | 0.80 | 81.98 | −0.05 | 81.93 | −0.05 | 81.89 | −0.70 | 81.19 | 0.40 | 81.59 | 0.75 | 82.34 | 0.35 | (Finland) |
| Belgium | 82.30 | 80.30 | 84.40 | 4.10 | 81.29 | 0.71 | 82.00 | −1.30 | 80.70 | 1.10 | 81.79 | −0.04 | 81.75 | 0.65 | 82.40 | −0.10 | 82.30 | 0.30 | (Belgium) |
| Slovenia | 82.29 | 79.70 | 85.00 | 5.30 | 81.08 | 0.45 | 81.53 | −1.00 | 80.53 | 0.14 | 80.68 | 0.61 | 81.28 | 0.65 | 81.93 | 0.36 | 82.29 | 0.76 | (Slovenia) |
| Denmark | 82.25 | 80.40 | 84.20 | 3.80 | 80.70 | 0.75 | 81.45 | 0.15 | 81.60 | −0.20 | 81.40 | −0.10 | 81.30 | 0.45 | 81.75 | 0.50 | 82.25 | 0.80 | (Denmark) |
| Canada | 82.11 | 80.03 | 84.29 | 4.26 | 81.78 | 0.37 | 82.16 | −0.63 | 81.53 | −0.08 | 81.45 | −0.36 | 81.09 | 0.53 | 81.63 | 0.48 | 82.11 | −0.05 | (Canada) |
| New Zealand | 82.01 | 80.40 | 83.70 | 3.30 | 81.46 | 0.60 | 82.06 | 0.20 | 82.26 | −0.05 | 82.21 | −0.25 | 81.96 | −0.20 | 81.76 | 0.25 | 82.01 | −0.05 | (New Zealand) |
| Austria | 82.00 | 79.80 | 84.30 | 4.50 | 81.49 | 0.40 | 81.90 | −0.70 | 81.19 | 0.00 | 81.19 | 0.10 | 81.30 | 0.50 | 81.79 | 0.20 | 82.00 | 0.10 | (Austria) |
| Netherlands | 81.97 | 80.60 | 83.40 | 2.80 | 81.71 | 0.40 | 82.11 | −0.75 | 81.36 | −0.05 | 81.31 | 0.30 | 81.61 | 0.25 | 81.86 | 0.10 | 81.97 | −0.15 | (Netherlands) |
| Puerto Rico | 81.90 | 78.28 | 85.38 | 7.10 | 80.04 | 1.40 | 81.44 | −1.43 | 80.01 | −0.24 | 79.77 | −0.34 | 79.43 | 2.26 | 81.69 | 0.21 | 81.90 | 0.46 | (Puerto Rico) |
| Greece | 81.84 | 79.40 | 84.40 | 5.00 | 81.39 | 0.25 | 81.64 | −0.35 | 81.29 | −1.20 | 80.08 | 0.70 | 80.79 | 0.95 | 81.74 | 0.10 | 81.84 | 0.20 | (Greece) |
| Cyprus | 81.82 | 79.84 | 83.80 | 3.96 | 81.34 | 0.12 | 81.45 | −0.22 | 81.23 | −0.66 | 80.57 | −0.14 | 80.43 | 1.21 | 81.65 | 0.17 | 81.82 | 0.37 | (Cyprus) |
| Bahrain | 81.42 | 80.86 | 82.13 | 1.27 | 80.21 | 0.26 | 80.47 | −1.79 | 78.68 | −0.60 | 78.08 | 2.91 | 80.99 | 0.29 | 81.28 | 0.14 | 81.42 | 0.95 | (Bahrain) |
| United Kingdom | 81.39 | 79.54 | 83.33 | 3.78 | 81.30 | 0.06 | 81.37 | −1.04 | 80.33 | 0.32 | 80.65 | 0.36 | 81.01 | 0.23 | 81.24 | 0.15 | 81.39 | 0.02 | (United Kingdom) |
| Chile | 81.36 | 79.45 | 83.23 | 3.77 | 79.71 | 0.61 | 80.32 | −0.97 | 79.35 | −0.47 | 78.88 | 0.30 | 79.18 | 1.99 | 81.17 | 0.19 | 81.36 | 1.03 | (Chile) |
| Maldives | 81.28 | 79.95 | 83.00 | 3.05 | 78.19 | 1.52 | 79.71 | −0.99 | 78.71 | −0.66 | 78.05 | 2.71 | 80.76 | 0.28 | 81.04 | 0.24 | 81.28 | 1.58 | (Maldives) |
| Channel Islands | 81.20 | 79.10 | 83.30 | 4.20 | 81.60 | −0.40 | 81.20 | −0.30 | 80.90 | −0.60 | 80.30 | 0.70 | 81.00 | 0.10 | 81.10 | 0.10 | 81.20 | 0.00 | (Channel Islands) |
| Isle of Man | 81.09 | 79.04 | 83.20 | 4.16 | 80.20 | 0.54 | 80.74 | −0.15 | 80.59 | −0.17 | 80.42 | 0.54 | 80.96 | 0.04 | 81.00 | 0.09 | 81.09 | 0.35 | (Isle of Man) |
| Costa Rica | 81.00 | 78.37 | 83.58 | 5.21 | 80.23 | 0.07 | 80.30 | −0.57 | 79.72 | −1.67 | 78.05 | 1.27 | 79.32 | 1.48 | 80.80 | 0.20 | 81.00 | 0.70 | (Costa Rica) |
| Germany | 80.79 | 78.50 | 83.20 | 4.70 | 81.09 | 0.20 | 81.29 | −0.25 | 81.04 | −0.25 | 80.79 | −0.18 | 80.61 | 0.43 | 81.04 | −0.25 | 80.79 | −0.50 | (Germany) |
| Virgin Islands (U.S.) | 80.77 | 77.60 | 84.10 | 6.50 | 78.87 | 0.80 | 79.67 | 0.15 | 79.82 | 0.25 | 80.07 | 0.25 | 80.32 | 0.20 | 80.52 | 0.25 | 80.77 | 1.10 | (United States Virgin Islands) |
| Cayman Islands | 80.54 | 78.20 | 83.00 | 4.81 | 77.86 | 1.19 | 79.05 | 0.18 | 79.23 | 0.07 | 79.30 | 0.68 | 79.98 | 0.37 | 80.36 | 0.18 | 80.54 | 1.49 | (Cayman Islands) |
| Oman | 80.25 | 78.72 | 82.05 | 3.33 | 79.03 | 0.92 | 79.95 | −2.18 | 77.76 | −1.79 | 75.97 | 1.94 | 77.91 | 2.12 | 80.03 | 0.21 | 80.25 | 0.30 | (Oman) |
| Czech Republic | 79.98 | 77.10 | 83.00 | 5.90 | 78.82 | 0.40 | 79.23 | −1.00 | 78.23 | −1.00 | 77.22 | 1.71 | 78.93 | 0.90 | 79.83 | 0.15 | 79.98 | 0.75 | (Czech Republic) |
| Albania | 79.78 | 77.92 | 81.59 | 3.67 | 78.03 | 1.44 | 79.47 | −1.64 | 77.82 | −0.98 | 76.84 | 1.93 | 78.77 | 0.83 | 79.60 | 0.17 | 79.78 | 0.31 | (Albania) |
| Panama | 79.78 | 76.88 | 82.71 | 5.83 | 77.36 | 1.15 | 78.51 | −2.18 | 76.33 | 0.67 | 77.00 | 2.32 | 79.32 | 0.27 | 79.59 | 0.18 | 79.78 | 1.26 | (Panama) |
| Estonia | 79.30 | 75.10 | 83.70 | 8.60 | 77.03 | 1.61 | 78.65 | −0.05 | 78.60 | −1.65 | 76.94 | 0.90 | 77.84 | 0.95 | 78.79 | 0.50 | 79.30 | 0.65 | (Estonia) |
| Saudi Arabia | 78.98 | 77.33 | 81.33 | 4.00 | 77.12 | 1.20 | 78.31 | −0.72 | 77.60 | −0.51 | 77.09 | 0.22 | 77.31 | 1.42 | 78.73 | 0.25 | 78.98 | 0.67 | (Saudi Arabia) |
| Northern Mariana Islands | 78.95 | 77.28 | 80.87 | 3.59 | 77.38 | 0.47 | 77.84 | 0.19 | 78.03 | 0.13 | 78.16 | 0.37 | 78.53 | 0.28 | 78.81 | 0.14 | 78.95 | 1.10 | (Northern Mariana Islands) |
| Croatia | 78.93 | 76.10 | 81.90 | 5.80 | 77.72 | 0.50 | 78.22 | −0.70 | 77.52 | −1.10 | 76.42 | 1.15 | 77.58 | 0.90 | 78.47 | 0.46 | 78.93 | 0.70 | (Croatia) |
| New Caledonia | 78.92 | 76.46 | 81.41 | 4.95 | 77.05 | 0.21 | 77.26 | −0.21 | 77.05 | 0.06 | 77.11 | 0.58 | 77.70 | 1.07 | 78.77 | 0.16 | 78.92 | 1.66 | (New Caledonia) |
| USA | 78.89 | 76.50 | 81.40 | 4.90 | 78.84 | −0.05 | 78.79 | −1.81 | 76.98 | −0.65 | 76.33 | 1.10 | 77.43 | 0.95 | 78.39 | 0.50 | 78.89 | 0.10 | (United States) |
| Poland | 78.41 | 74.80 | 82.20 | 7.40 | 77.60 | 0.30 | 77.90 | −1.50 | 76.40 | −1.05 | 75.35 | 1.80 | 77.16 | 1.10 | 78.26 | 0.15 | 78.41 | 0.50 | (Poland) |
| Slovakia | 78.37 | 75.20 | 81.70 | 6.50 | 76.81 | 0.85 | 77.67 | −0.80 | 76.87 | −2.25 | 74.61 | 2.35 | 76.97 | 1.15 | 78.12 | 0.25 | 78.37 | 0.70 | (Slovakia) |
| Armenia | 78.32 | 75.10 | 81.70 | 6.60 | 74.87 | 1.35 | 76.22 | −2.85 | 73.38 | −1.10 | 72.28 | 2.49 | 74.77 | 2.70 | 77.47 | 0.85 | 78.32 | 2.10 | (Armenia) |
| Uruguay | 78.29 | 74.38 | 82.04 | 7.66 | 77.19 | 0.31 | 77.50 | 0.88 | 78.38 | −2.95 | 75.43 | 1.03 | 76.47 | 1.67 | 78.14 | 0.15 | 78.29 | 0.78 | (Uruguay) |
| Cuba | 78.26 | 75.86 | 80.68 | 4.82 | 77.83 | −0.41 | 77.41 | −0.01 | 77.41 | −4.21 | 73.20 | 4.43 | 77.63 | 0.46 | 78.08 | 0.18 | 78.26 | 0.85 | (Cuba) |
| Bosnia and Herzegovina | 78.04 | 74.65 | 81.07 | 6.42 | 77.09 | 0.31 | 77.39 | −1.35 | 76.04 | −1.47 | 74.57 | 2.21 | 76.78 | 1.07 | 77.85 | 0.19 | 78.04 | 0.65 | (Bosnia and Herzegovina) |
| China | 78.02 | 75.25 | 80.97 | 5.72 | 76.71 | 1.23 | 77.94 | 0.08 | 78.02 | 0.10 | 78.12 | 0.08 | 78.20 | −0.25 | 77.95 | 0.06 | 78.02 | 0.08 | (China) |
| Jordan | 77.98 | 75.89 | 80.33 | 4.44 | 74.61 | 2.26 | 76.86 | −1.28 | 75.58 | −1.38 | 74.20 | 2.88 | 77.09 | 0.73 | 77.81 | 0.17 | 77.98 | 1.12 | (Jordan) |
| Lebanon | 77.94 | 75.88 | 79.86 | 3.98 | 78.15 | 0.06 | 78.21 | −1.91 | 76.30 | −2.65 | 73.65 | 4.35 | 78.00 | −0.19 | 77.82 | 0.13 | 77.94 | −0.26 | (Lebanon) |
| Peru | 77.94 | 75.63 | 80.30 | 4.67 | 75.26 | 1.02 | 76.28 | −2.44 | 73.83 | −2.24 | 71.60 | 5.24 | 76.83 | 0.91 | 77.74 | 0.20 | 77.94 | 1.67 | (Peru) |
| Colombia | 77.91 | 75.16 | 80.61 | 5.45 | 75.95 | 0.84 | 76.79 | −2.04 | 74.76 | −2.06 | 72.70 | 3.81 | 76.51 | 1.22 | 77.72 | 0.19 | 77.91 | 1.12 | (Colombia) |
| Montenegro | 77.89 | 75.50 | 80.40 | 4.90 | 76.34 | 0.34 | 76.68 | −0.75 | 75.93 | −2.11 | 73.82 | 2.36 | 76.19 | 1.40 | 77.59 | 0.30 | 77.89 | 1.21 | (Montenegro) |
| Iran | 77.85 | 76.00 | 79.81 | 3.81 | 75.64 | 1.22 | 76.86 | −2.71 | 74.14 | −0.39 | 73.75 | 3.05 | 76.80 | 0.85 | 77.65 | 0.20 | 77.85 | 1.00 | (Iran) |
| Antigua and Barbuda | 77.77 | 74.74 | 80.45 | 5.70 | 76.91 | 0.26 | 77.17 | −0.01 | 77.16 | 0.04 | 77.20 | 0.29 | 77.48 | 0.11 | 77.60 | 0.17 | 77.77 | 0.60 | (Antigua and Barbuda) |
| Sri Lanka | 77.67 | 74.45 | 80.75 | 6.30 | 75.76 | 0.94 | 76.70 | 0.23 | 76.93 | −0.65 | 76.28 | 1.02 | 77.30 | 0.18 | 77.48 | 0.19 | 77.67 | 0.97 | (Sri Lanka) |
| Ecuador | 77.58 | 74.88 | 80.31 | 5.43 | 76.14 | 1.14 | 77.29 | −5.28 | 72.00 | 0.74 | 72.75 | 3.83 | 76.58 | 0.81 | 77.39 | 0.19 | 77.58 | 0.29 | (Ecuador) |
| Argentina | 77.54 | 74.98 | 80.02 | 5.04 | 76.27 | 0.58 | 76.85 | −0.97 | 75.88 | −1.93 | 73.95 | 1.86 | 75.81 | 1.59 | 77.39 | 0.15 | 77.54 | 0.70 | (Argentina) |
| Guam | 77.42 | 73.66 | 81.59 | 7.93 | 76.42 | 0.22 | 76.64 | −1.12 | 75.53 | −0.09 | 75.43 | 1.67 | 77.10 | 0.11 | 77.21 | 0.21 | 77.42 | 0.78 | (Guam) |
| Turkey | 77.42 | 74.62 | 80.34 | 5.72 | 76.45 | 1.28 | 77.74 | −1.21 | 76.53 | −0.80 | 75.72 | 1.87 | 77.59 | −0.43 | 77.16 | 0.27 | 77.42 | −0.32 | (Turkey) |
| Lithuania | 77.20 | 73.00 | 81.60 | 8.60 | 74.52 | 1.77 | 76.28 | −1.25 | 75.03 | −0.99 | 74.04 | 1.61 | 75.64 | 1.65 | 77.29 | −0.10 | 77.20 | 0.91 | (Lithuania) |
| Curacao | 76.99 | 72.66 | 80.96 | 8.30 | 76.38 | 0.11 | 76.49 | 0.01 | 76.50 | −0.81 | 75.69 | 1.04 | 76.73 | 0.07 | 76.80 | 0.19 | 76.99 | 0.50 | (Curaçao) |
| Malaysia | 76.82 | 74.45 | 79.52 | 5.07 | 75.34 | 0.56 | 75.90 | 0.16 | 76.06 | −2.14 | 73.92 | 1.53 | 75.44 | 1.21 | 76.66 | 0.16 | 76.82 | 0.92 | (Malaysia) |
| Hungary | 76.72 | 73.70 | 79.90 | 6.20 | 75.76 | 0.56 | 76.32 | −0.90 | 75.42 | −1.35 | 74.07 | 1.80 | 75.87 | 0.70 | 76.57 | 0.15 | 76.72 | 0.40 | (Hungary) |
| Tunisia | 76.71 | 74.13 | 79.33 | 5.20 | 74.78 | 0.81 | 75.60 | −0.59 | 75.00 | −2.11 | 72.89 | 3.16 | 76.05 | 0.46 | 76.51 | 0.20 | 76.71 | 1.11 | (Tunisia) |
| North Macedonia | 76.62 | 74.48 | 78.86 | 4.38 | 75.45 | 1.15 | 76.60 | −2.21 | 74.40 | −1.15 | 73.25 | 1.18 | 74.42 | 0.89 | 75.32 | 1.30 | 76.62 | 0.01 | (North Macedonia) |
| Thailand | 76.56 | 72.34 | 80.98 | 8.64 | 76.28 | 0.92 | 77.20 | 0.13 | 77.33 | 0.27 | 77.61 | −2.31 | 75.29 | 1.12 | 76.41 | 0.15 | 76.56 | −0.63 | (Thailand) |
| Sint Maarten | 76.53 | 73.85 | 79.66 | 5.81 | 75.73 | −0.05 | 75.68 | −0.68 | 75.00 | −0.50 | 74.50 | 1.68 | 76.18 | 0.19 | 76.37 | 0.16 | 76.53 | 0.85 | (Sint Maarten) |
| Aruba | 76.50 | 73.84 | 78.92 | 5.07 | 75.26 | 0.76 | 76.02 | −0.61 | 75.41 | −1.75 | 73.66 | 2.57 | 76.23 | 0.13 | 76.35 | 0.15 | 76.50 | 0.48 | (Aruba) |
| Algeria | 76.47 | 75.10 | 77.91 | 2.82 | 74.99 | 0.69 | 75.68 | −2.42 | 73.26 | 1.95 | 75.21 | 0.92 | 76.13 | 0.13 | 76.26 | 0.21 | 76.47 | 0.79 | (Algeria) |
| Romania | 76.46 | 72.80 | 80.30 | 7.50 | 74.91 | 0.70 | 75.61 | −1.35 | 74.25 | −1.44 | 72.81 | 2.34 | 75.15 | 1.25 | 76.40 | 0.05 | 76.46 | 0.85 | (Romania) |
| Latvia | 76.43 | 71.60 | 81.50 | 9.90 | 74.12 | 1.26 | 75.39 | −0.20 | 75.19 | −2.20 | 72.98 | 1.30 | 74.28 | 1.15 | 75.43 | 1.00 | 76.43 | 1.04 | (Latvia) |
| Barbados | 76.33 | 73.75 | 78.76 | 5.01 | 75.93 | 0.57 | 76.50 | 0.15 | 76.65 | −0.07 | 76.58 | −0.90 | 75.68 | 0.50 | 76.18 | 0.15 | 76.33 | −0.16 | (Barbados) |
| Seychelles | 76.30 | 72.10 | 80.70 | 8.60 | 73.23 | 0.82 | 74.05 | 3.19 | 77.24 | −3.84 | 73.40 | 1.11 | 74.51 | 0.91 | 75.42 | 0.88 | 76.30 | 2.25 | (Seychelles) |
| Cape Verde | 76.22 | 73.05 | 79.37 | 6.32 | 73.79 | 1.66 | 75.45 | −1.63 | 73.82 | 0.61 | 74.42 | 1.48 | 75.91 | 0.15 | 76.06 | 0.17 | 76.22 | 0.78 | (Cape Verde) |
| Brazil | 76.02 | 72.95 | 79.14 | 6.19 | 74.82 | 0.99 | 75.81 | −1.30 | 74.51 | −1.47 | 73.04 | 1.83 | 74.87 | 0.98 | 75.85 | 0.17 | 76.02 | 0.21 | (Brazil) |
| Serbia | 75.97 | 73.70 | 78.35 | 4.65 | 75.34 | 0.60 | 75.94 | −1.46 | 74.48 | −1.70 | 72.78 | 2.46 | 75.24 | 0.90 | 76.14 | −0.17 | 75.97 | 0.03 | (Serbia) |
| Bulgaria | 75.76 | 72.20 | 79.50 | 7.30 | 74.47 | 0.65 | 75.11 | −1.76 | 73.36 | −2.14 | 71.21 | 2.95 | 74.16 | 1.60 | 75.76 | 0.00 | 75.76 | 0.65 | (Bulgaria) |
| Brunei | 75.50 | 73.49 | 77.73 | 4.24 | 74.86 | 0.19 | 75.05 | 0.06 | 75.11 | −0.25 | 74.87 | −1.95 | 72.92 | 2.41 | 75.33 | 0.17 | 75.50 | 0.45 | (Brunei) |
| Morocco | 75.49 | 73.35 | 77.78 | 4.43 | 72.52 | 1.72 | 74.25 | −1.11 | 73.13 | 0.25 | 73.39 | 1.78 | 75.16 | 0.15 | 75.31 | 0.18 | 75.49 | 1.25 | (Morocco) |
| Grenada | 75.37 | 72.52 | 78.50 | 5.98 | 75.05 | −0.07 | 74.97 | 0.05 | 75.02 | −0.50 | 74.52 | 0.63 | 75.15 | 0.05 | 75.20 | 0.16 | 75.37 | 0.40 | (Grenada) |
| Mexico | 75.26 | 72.44 | 78.00 | 5.56 | 74.40 | 0.13 | 74.53 | −4.08 | 70.45 | −0.70 | 69.75 | 4.22 | 73.97 | 1.10 | 75.07 | 0.19 | 75.26 | 0.73 | (Mexico) |
| Nicaragua | 75.10 | 72.46 | 77.58 | 5.11 | 72.79 | 0.97 | 73.76 | −3.00 | 70.77 | −0.29 | 70.48 | 3.98 | 74.46 | 0.48 | 74.95 | 0.15 | 75.10 | 1.34 | (Nicaragua) |
| Bangladesh | 74.93 | 73.30 | 76.67 | 3.36 | 70.02 | 2.61 | 72.62 | −1.20 | 71.42 | −0.32 | 71.10 | 3.16 | 74.27 | 0.41 | 74.67 | 0.26 | 74.93 | 2.31 | (Bangladesh) |
| Vietnam | 74.74 | 70.05 | 79.38 | 9.33 | 73.89 | 0.33 | 74.21 | 1.17 | 75.38 | −1.24 | 74.14 | 0.36 | 74.50 | 0.09 | 74.59 | 0.15 | 74.74 | 0.53 | (Vietnam) |
| Bahamas | 74.71 | 71.06 | 78.33 | 7.27 | 74.03 | −2.62 | 71.41 | 1.59 | 72.99 | −2.24 | 70.75 | 3.74 | 74.49 | 0.06 | 74.55 | 0.16 | 74.71 | 3.30 | (The Bahamas) |
| Ukraine | 74.69 | 69.79 | 79.39 | 9.61 | 71.80 | 2.12 | 73.92 | −0.64 | 73.28 | −1.65 | 71.63 | 1.03 | 72.66 | 0.76 | 73.42 | 1.27 | 74.69 | 0.77 | (Ukraine) |
| Georgia | 74.66 | 69.75 | 79.23 | 9.49 | 73.11 | 1.06 | 74.17 | −0.66 | 73.51 | −1.87 | 71.64 | 2.51 | 74.14 | 0.35 | 74.50 | 0.16 | 74.66 | 0.49 | (Georgia (country)) |
| Azerbaijan | 74.58 | 71.71 | 77.28 | 5.58 | 71.93 | 1.36 | 73.29 | −2.98 | 70.31 | 0.69 | 71.00 | 3.13 | 74.12 | 0.30 | 74.43 | 0.15 | 74.58 | 1.29 | (Azerbaijan) |
| Kazakhstan | 74.53 | 70.27 | 78.52 | 8.25 | 71.42 | 2.24 | 73.66 | −2.46 | 71.19 | −1.06 | 70.13 | 3.37 | 73.50 | 0.90 | 74.40 | 0.13 | 74.53 | 0.87 | (Kazakhstan) |
| Belarus | 74.37 | 69.74 | 79.22 | 9.48 | 72.97 | 1.26 | 74.23 | −2.09 | 72.14 | −0.07 | 72.07 | 2.03 | 74.10 | 0.08 | 74.18 | 0.18 | 74.37 | 0.14 | (Belarus) |
| Paraguay | 73.98 | 71.01 | 77.09 | 6.08 | 73.42 | 0.25 | 73.67 | −0.95 | 72.72 | −4.61 | 68.11 | 4.21 | 72.32 | 1.52 | 73.84 | 0.14 | 73.98 | 0.31 | (Paraguay) |
| Dominican Republic | 73.87 | 70.66 | 77.11 | 6.44 | 73.14 | −0.03 | 73.11 | −0.48 | 72.64 | −0.88 | 71.76 | 2.45 | 74.21 | −0.49 | 73.72 | 0.15 | 73.87 | 0.76 | (Dominican Republic) |
| Mauritius | 73.79 | 70.35 | 77.40 | 7.05 | 74.19 | 0.04 | 74.24 | −0.06 | 74.18 | −0.50 | 73.68 | −0.17 | 73.51 | −0.10 | 73.41 | 0.38 | 73.79 | −0.45 | (Mauritius) |
| Suriname | 73.76 | 70.59 | 76.98 | 6.38 | 70.33 | 1.44 | 71.77 | 0.55 | 72.32 | −3.38 | 68.94 | 4.31 | 73.25 | 0.38 | 73.63 | 0.13 | 73.76 | 1.98 | (Suriname) |
| North Korea | 73.74 | 71.55 | 75.88 | 4.33 | 72.45 | 0.48 | 72.93 | −0.14 | 72.78 | 0.65 | 73.44 | 0.20 | 73.64 | 0.00 | 73.64 | 0.10 | 73.74 | 0.81 | (North Korea) |
| Belize | 73.74 | 71.08 | 76.66 | 5.58 | 71.44 | 1.14 | 72.58 | −1.00 | 71.58 | −0.66 | 70.92 | 1.27 | 72.19 | 1.38 | 73.57 | 0.17 | 73.74 | 1.16 | (Belize) |
| Trinidad and Tobago | 73.62 | 70.51 | 76.83 | 6.32 | 72.90 | −0.06 | 72.84 | −0.19 | 72.64 | −1.53 | 71.11 | 2.22 | 73.33 | 0.16 | 73.49 | 0.13 | 73.62 | 0.78 | (Trinidad and Tobago) |
| World | 73.48 | 71.12 | 75.97 | 4.86 | 71.78 | 1.09 | 72.87 | −0.69 | 72.18 | −0.97 | 71.22 | 1.75 | 72.97 | 0.36 | 73.33 | 0.15 | 73.48 | 0.61 | |
| Russia | 73.44 | 68.26 | 78.88 | 10.62 | 70.74 | 2.34 | 73.08 | −1.75 | 71.34 | −1.44 | 69.90 | 2.65 | 72.55 | 0.71 | 73.25 | 0.19 | 73.44 | 0.36 | (Russia) |
| Caribbean small states | 73.31 | 70.12 | 76.60 | 6.48 | 71.77 | 0.36 | 72.13 | −0.19 | 71.94 | −2.02 | 69.92 | 2.91 | 72.83 | 0.34 | 73.17 | 0.14 | 73.31 | 1.18 | |
| Bhutan | 73.26 | 71.57 | 75.27 | 3.70 | 70.50 | 1.50 | 72.00 | 0.25 | 72.25 | 0.19 | 72.45 | 0.31 | 72.75 | 0.22 | 72.97 | 0.29 | 73.26 | 1.26 | (Bhutan) |
| Tonga | 73.07 | 69.50 | 76.54 | 7.04 | 71.72 | 0.57 | 72.29 | 0.09 | 72.38 | −0.25 | 72.13 | 0.51 | 72.64 | 0.26 | 72.89 | 0.17 | 73.07 | 0.78 | (Tonga) |
| Honduras | 73.04 | 70.49 | 75.67 | 5.18 | 71.03 | 1.09 | 72.12 | −1.26 | 70.86 | −1.37 | 69.49 | 3.22 | 72.72 | 0.17 | 72.88 | 0.16 | 73.04 | 0.92 | (Honduras) |
| St. Lucia | 72.85 | 69.45 | 76.45 | 7.00 | 72.68 | −0.43 | 72.25 | 0.06 | 72.31 | −3.19 | 69.12 | 3.55 | 72.67 | 0.03 | 72.70 | 0.15 | 72.85 | 0.60 | (Saint Lucia) |
| Guatemala | 72.75 | 70.44 | 75.04 | 4.60 | 70.94 | 0.70 | 71.64 | −1.67 | 69.97 | −2.11 | 67.86 | 3.35 | 71.21 | 1.40 | 72.60 | 0.14 | 72.75 | 1.11 | (Guatemala) |
| Venezuela | 72.67 | 68.89 | 76.66 | 7.77 | 72.84 | −0.07 | 72.77 | −0.40 | 72.37 | −0.83 | 71.54 | 1.03 | 72.57 | −0.05 | 72.51 | 0.16 | 72.67 | −0.09 | (Venezuela) |
| Syria | 72.56 | 70.21 | 74.92 | 4.71 | 65.49 | 5.48 | 70.97 | 0.97 | 71.94 | 0.47 | 72.42 | 0.37 | 72.79 | −0.67 | 72.12 | 0.44 | 72.56 | 1.59 | (Syria) |
| Uzbekistan | 72.53 | 69.56 | 75.55 | 5.98 | 70.97 | 1.12 | 72.09 | −0.63 | 71.46 | 0.22 | 71.68 | 0.47 | 72.15 | 0.24 | 72.39 | 0.14 | 72.53 | 0.44 | (Uzbekistan) |
| Iraq | 72.42 | 70.50 | 74.18 | 3.68 | 69.68 | 1.57 | 71.25 | −1.59 | 69.65 | 1.05 | 70.70 | 1.33 | 72.04 | 0.29 | 72.32 | 0.10 | 72.42 | 1.18 | (Iraq) |
| Kyrgyzstan | 72.40 | 68.40 | 76.60 | 8.20 | 70.40 | 1.20 | 71.60 | 0.20 | 71.80 | 0.10 | 71.90 | 0.15 | 72.05 | 0.20 | 72.25 | 0.15 | 72.40 | 0.80 | (Kyrgyzstan) |
| Mongolia | 72.40 | 67.92 | 77.10 | 9.18 | 70.58 | 0.47 | 71.05 | 0.30 | 71.35 | 0.30 | 71.65 | 0.26 | 71.90 | 0.22 | 72.12 | 0.28 | 72.40 | 1.34 | (Mongolia) |
| El Salvador | 72.30 | 67.76 | 76.49 | 8.73 | 71.14 | 0.58 | 71.72 | −1.48 | 70.24 | −0.30 | 69.94 | 2.03 | 71.97 | 0.13 | 72.10 | 0.20 | 72.30 | 0.58 | (El Salvador) |
| India | 72.23 | 70.73 | 73.86 | 3.13 | 68.93 | 1.81 | 70.75 | −0.59 | 70.16 | −2.87 | 67.28 | 4.42 | 71.70 | 0.31 | 72.00 | 0.23 | 72.23 | 1.49 | (India) |
| Tajikistan | 71.93 | 69.68 | 74.14 | 4.46 | 69.70 | 1.27 | 70.96 | −2.36 | 68.61 | 0.99 | 69.59 | 1.97 | 71.56 | 0.23 | 71.79 | 0.14 | 71.93 | 0.97 | (Tajikistan) |
| Samoa | 71.83 | 69.96 | 73.82 | 3.86 | 71.14 | −0.87 | 70.27 | 0.46 | 70.73 | 0.37 | 71.10 | 0.45 | 71.55 | 0.15 | 71.70 | 0.13 | 71.83 | 1.56 | (Samoa) |
| Egypt | 71.81 | 69.65 | 74.01 | 4.36 | 69.91 | 1.30 | 71.21 | −1.42 | 69.79 | −0.81 | 68.98 | 2.03 | 71.01 | 0.62 | 71.63 | 0.17 | 71.81 | 0.59 | (Egypt) |
| Vanuatu | 71.65 | 69.58 | 74.11 | 4.53 | 70.04 | 0.74 | 70.78 | −0.40 | 70.39 | −0.43 | 69.95 | 1.35 | 71.30 | 0.17 | 71.48 | 0.18 | 71.65 | 0.87 | (Vanuatu) |
| Jamaica | 71.61 | 69.08 | 74.15 | 5.07 | 72.36 | −0.83 | 71.53 | −0.08 | 71.45 | −2.37 | 69.08 | 2.40 | 71.48 | 0.00 | 71.48 | 0.13 | 71.61 | 0.07 | (Jamaica) |
| St. Vincent and the Grenadines | 71.38 | 68.78 | 74.48 | 5.69 | 70.36 | 0.64 | 70.99 | −1.39 | 69.61 | −0.47 | 69.13 | 2.06 | 71.19 | 0.04 | 71.23 | 0.15 | 71.38 | 0.39 | (Saint Vincent and the Grenadines) |
| Moldova | 71.33 | 66.70 | 75.67 | 8.97 | 70.24 | −0.06 | 70.18 | −0.27 | 69.91 | −0.92 | 68.99 | 2.56 | 71.55 | −0.35 | 71.20 | 0.13 | 71.33 | 1.15 | (Moldova) |
| Dominica | 71.29 | 68.35 | 74.72 | 6.37 | 71.19 | 0.12 | 71.31 | −0.04 | 71.27 | −1.44 | 69.83 | 1.25 | 71.08 | 0.05 | 71.13 | 0.16 | 71.29 | −0.01 | (Dominica) |
| Indonesia | 71.29 | 69.16 | 73.43 | 4.27 | 69.29 | 1.06 | 70.35 | −1.53 | 68.82 | −1.36 | 67.45 | 3.47 | 70.92 | 0.22 | 71.15 | 0.14 | 71.29 | 0.94 | (Indonesia) |
| Libya | 71.12 | 69.62 | 72.68 | 3.05 | 71.30 | 1.64 | 72.94 | −0.55 | 72.39 | −0.33 | 72.06 | 2.40 | 74.46 | −5.12 | 69.34 | 1.78 | 71.12 | −1.82 | (Libya) |
| Cambodia | 70.82 | 68.15 | 73.36 | 5.21 | 69.12 | 1.01 | 70.13 | −0.07 | 70.06 | −0.76 | 69.30 | 1.23 | 70.53 | 0.14 | 70.67 | 0.15 | 70.82 | 0.69 | (Cambodia) |
| Solomon Islands | 70.69 | 69.36 | 72.18 | 2.82 | 68.98 | 1.00 | 69.98 | −0.72 | 69.26 | −0.37 | 68.89 | 1.52 | 70.41 | 0.12 | 70.53 | 0.17 | 70.69 | 0.71 | (Solomon Islands) |
| Nepal | 70.64 | 69.09 | 72.14 | 3.05 | 67.81 | 1.49 | 69.30 | −0.19 | 69.11 | −0.72 | 68.39 | 1.70 | 70.09 | 0.27 | 70.35 | 0.28 | 70.64 | 1.34 | (Nepal) |
| Guyana | 70.32 | 66.62 | 74.09 | 7.47 | 67.33 | 1.73 | 69.07 | −1.32 | 67.75 | −3.43 | 64.32 | 5.57 | 69.89 | 0.29 | 70.18 | 0.14 | 70.32 | 1.25 | (Guyana) |
| Greenland | 70.27 | 68.41 | 72.23 | 3.82 | 70.51 | 0.90 | 71.41 | −0.12 | 71.29 | −0.02 | 71.26 | −0.03 | 71.23 | −0.26 | 70.97 | −0.70 | 70.27 | −1.14 | (Greenland) |
| Turkmenistan | 70.20 | 67.00 | 73.01 | 6.01 | 69.00 | 0.40 | 69.41 | −0.56 | 68.85 | 0.51 | 69.35 | 0.56 | 69.91 | 0.16 | 70.07 | 0.13 | 70.20 | 0.80 | (Turkmenistan) |
| Philippines | 69.95 | 66.99 | 72.96 | 5.97 | 69.31 | 0.37 | 69.68 | 0.42 | 70.10 | −3.42 | 66.67 | 2.80 | 69.47 | 0.36 | 69.83 | 0.11 | 69.95 | 0.27 | (Philippines) |
| Sao Tome and Principe | 69.91 | 66.41 | 73.91 | 7.50 | 65.48 | 2.57 | 68.04 | −0.06 | 67.98 | 0.05 | 68.03 | 1.21 | 69.24 | 0.48 | 69.72 | 0.19 | 69.91 | 1.86 | (São Tomé and Príncipe) |
| Pacific island small states | 69.44 | 67.53 | 71.50 | 3.96 | 68.04 | 0.60 | 68.64 | −0.29 | 68.36 | −0.88 | 67.48 | 1.62 | 69.10 | 0.17 | 69.27 | 0.17 | 69.44 | 0.80 | |
| Yemen | 69.44 | 67.37 | 71.55 | 4.18 | 68.00 | −1.44 | 66.57 | −0.13 | 66.44 | −0.42 | 66.02 | 1.93 | 67.95 | 1.34 | 69.30 | 0.14 | 69.44 | 2.87 | (Yemen) |
| Botswana | 69.29 | 66.78 | 71.85 | 5.07 | 62.17 | 5.00 | 67.17 | 0.48 | 67.64 | −4.34 | 63.30 | 5.45 | 68.75 | 0.41 | 69.16 | 0.13 | 69.29 | 2.13 | (Botswana) |
| Laos | 69.22 | 67.02 | 71.53 | 4.51 | 66.35 | 1.56 | 67.91 | 0.43 | 68.34 | −0.53 | 67.81 | 0.91 | 68.72 | 0.25 | 68.96 | 0.26 | 69.22 | 1.31 | (Laos) |
| Palestine | 69.21 | 65.22 | 74.25 | 9.03 | 72.78 | 3.03 | 75.81 | −0.81 | 75.00 | −1.11 | 73.89 | 2.77 | 76.66 | −11.49 | 65.17 | 4.04 | 69.21 | −6.60 | (Palestine) |
| Senegal | 68.92 | 67.01 | 71.01 | 4.01 | 66.00 | 1.67 | 67.67 | −0.17 | 67.50 | −0.63 | 66.87 | 0.92 | 67.79 | 0.90 | 68.68 | 0.24 | 68.92 | 1.26 | (Senegal) |
| Eritrea | 68.89 | 66.76 | 70.94 | 4.19 | 65.52 | 1.79 | 67.31 | −0.33 | 66.98 | −0.04 | 66.94 | 0.85 | 67.79 | 0.83 | 68.62 | 0.27 | 68.89 | 1.59 | (Eritrea) |
| Bolivia | 68.74 | 66.27 | 71.32 | 5.06 | 66.97 | 0.85 | 67.82 | −4.91 | 62.91 | −1.48 | 61.43 | 6.01 | 67.43 | 1.15 | 68.58 | 0.16 | 68.74 | 0.92 | (Bolivia) |
| Mauritania | 68.71 | 66.70 | 70.73 | 4.03 | 66.21 | 1.43 | 67.64 | −0.85 | 66.79 | −0.03 | 66.76 | 1.52 | 68.28 | 0.20 | 68.48 | 0.23 | 68.71 | 1.07 | (Mauritania) |
| Gabon | 68.51 | 66.06 | 71.24 | 5.18 | 66.07 | 1.27 | 67.34 | −0.26 | 67.07 | 0.00 | 67.07 | 0.64 | 67.71 | 0.62 | 68.34 | 0.17 | 68.51 | 1.17 | (Gabon) |
| Uganda | 68.49 | 65.49 | 71.36 | 5.88 | 63.06 | 3.30 | 66.35 | 0.06 | 66.41 | 0.04 | 66.45 | 1.22 | 67.67 | 0.58 | 68.25 | 0.23 | 68.49 | 2.13 | (Uganda) |
| Rwanda | 68.02 | 65.71 | 70.14 | 4.43 | 65.09 | 1.60 | 66.69 | 0.26 | 66.95 | −0.10 | 66.85 | 0.68 | 67.53 | 0.26 | 67.78 | 0.23 | 68.02 | 1.33 | (Rwanda) |
| Timor-Leste | 67.90 | 66.27 | 69.67 | 3.41 | 65.03 | 1.47 | 66.50 | 0.42 | 66.92 | −0.72 | 66.20 | 1.17 | 67.37 | 0.32 | 67.69 | 0.22 | 67.90 | 1.41 | (Timor-Leste) |
| Pakistan | 67.80 | 65.46 | 70.32 | 4.86 | 65.37 | 1.36 | 66.73 | −1.03 | 65.70 | 0.07 | 65.77 | 1.64 | 67.42 | 0.23 | 67.65 | 0.15 | 67.80 | 1.07 | (Pakistan) |
| Ethiopia | 67.60 | 64.36 | 71.02 | 6.67 | 62.93 | 2.81 | 65.74 | 0.23 | 65.97 | −0.64 | 65.33 | 1.57 | 66.90 | 0.42 | 67.31 | 0.29 | 67.60 | 1.86 | (Ethiopia) |
| Malawi | 67.56 | 64.27 | 70.77 | 6.50 | 61.65 | 3.34 | 65.00 | 0.22 | 65.22 | −0.43 | 64.78 | 1.26 | 66.04 | 1.32 | 67.35 | 0.21 | 67.56 | 2.57 | (Malawi) |
| Namibia | 67.52 | 63.45 | 71.48 | 8.02 | 59.31 | 4.23 | 63.55 | 0.52 | 64.07 | −3.22 | 60.85 | 3.34 | 64.19 | 3.20 | 67.39 | 0.13 | 67.52 | 3.97 | (Namibia) |
| Fiji | 67.46 | 65.47 | 69.54 | 4.07 | 66.58 | 0.43 | 67.01 | −0.08 | 66.92 | −2.02 | 64.90 | 2.24 | 67.15 | 0.17 | 67.32 | 0.15 | 67.46 | 0.45 | (Fiji) |
| Micronesia | 67.36 | 63.63 | 71.28 | 7.65 | 65.29 | 0.90 | 66.20 | −0.32 | 65.88 | 0.27 | 66.15 | 0.81 | 66.96 | 0.24 | 67.20 | 0.16 | 67.36 | 1.16 | (Federated States of Micronesia) |
| Tanzania | 67.21 | 64.40 | 70.00 | 5.60 | 63.36 | 2.64 | 66.01 | 0.76 | 66.77 | −0.64 | 66.13 | 0.75 | 66.88 | 0.12 | 67.00 | 0.22 | 67.21 | 1.20 | (Tanzania) |
| Myanmar | 67.09 | 63.99 | 70.38 | 6.39 | 64.99 | 1.46 | 66.46 | 0.16 | 66.61 | −1.06 | 65.55 | 0.95 | 66.51 | 0.38 | 66.89 | 0.21 | 67.09 | 0.64 | (Myanmar) |
| Comoros | 67.02 | 65.02 | 69.20 | 4.18 | 64.14 | 1.52 | 65.66 | 0.09 | 65.76 | −0.56 | 65.20 | 1.28 | 66.48 | 0.30 | 66.78 | 0.25 | 67.02 | 1.36 | (Comoros) |
| Kiribati | 66.60 | 64.69 | 68.32 | 3.64 | 65.87 | 0.00 | 65.87 | −0.66 | 65.20 | −1.06 | 64.15 | 2.12 | 66.27 | 0.20 | 66.47 | 0.13 | 66.60 | 0.73 | (Kiribati) |
| Zambia | 66.53 | 64.10 | 68.87 | 4.77 | 60.11 | 2.80 | 62.91 | 0.45 | 63.36 | −1.00 | 62.36 | 2.92 | 65.28 | 1.07 | 66.35 | 0.18 | 66.53 | 3.61 | (Zambia) |
| Sudan | 66.52 | 63.45 | 69.83 | 6.38 | 63.99 | 1.81 | 65.80 | −0.68 | 65.12 | −0.66 | 64.46 | 1.23 | 65.69 | 0.64 | 66.33 | 0.19 | 66.52 | 0.72 | (Sudan) |
| South Africa | 66.31 | 62.78 | 69.79 | 7.01 | 63.18 | 2.89 | 66.07 | −0.92 | 65.15 | −3.14 | 62.01 | 3.44 | 65.45 | 0.69 | 66.14 | 0.17 | 66.31 | 0.24 | (South Africa) |
| Afghanistan | 66.29 | 64.70 | 67.81 | 3.11 | 62.26 | 0.68 | 62.94 | −1.49 | 61.45 | −1.04 | 60.42 | 5.20 | 65.62 | 0.42 | 66.03 | 0.25 | 66.29 | 3.35 | (Afghanistan) |
| Papua New Guinea | 66.26 | 63.84 | 69.21 | 5.38 | 64.20 | 1.13 | 65.33 | −0.26 | 65.08 | −0.72 | 64.36 | 0.92 | 65.27 | 0.86 | 66.13 | 0.12 | 66.26 | 0.92 | (Papua New Guinea) |
| Djibouti | 66.20 | 63.73 | 68.74 | 5.02 | 62.43 | 1.95 | 64.38 | −0.18 | 64.20 | −0.37 | 63.83 | 1.71 | 65.54 | 0.45 | 65.99 | 0.22 | 66.20 | 1.82 | (Djibouti) |
| Gambia | 66.06 | 64.35 | 67.75 | 3.40 | 62.58 | 1.85 | 64.43 | −0.01 | 64.42 | −0.57 | 63.85 | 1.01 | 64.86 | 1.00 | 65.86 | 0.20 | 66.06 | 1.63 | (The Gambia) |
| Congo, Rep. | 66.00 | 64.33 | 67.72 | 3.39 | 63.35 | −0.20 | 63.15 | 1.24 | 64.39 | −0.20 | 64.19 | 0.81 | 65.00 | 0.77 | 65.77 | 0.23 | 66.00 | 2.85 | (Republic of the Congo) |
| Ghana | 65.69 | 63.31 | 68.16 | 4.85 | 62.83 | 1.62 | 64.45 | −0.15 | 64.31 | −0.02 | 64.29 | 0.96 | 65.25 | 0.25 | 65.50 | 0.20 | 65.69 | 1.24 | (Ghana) |
| Haiti | 65.12 | 61.90 | 68.49 | 6.59 | 62.97 | 1.36 | 64.33 | −0.55 | 63.77 | −1.16 | 62.61 | 1.34 | 63.95 | 0.99 | 64.94 | 0.18 | 65.12 | 0.79 | (Haiti) |
| Angola | 64.81 | 62.27 | 67.34 | 5.07 | 60.40 | 2.66 | 63.05 | 0.06 | 63.12 | −0.16 | 62.96 | 1.29 | 64.25 | 0.37 | 64.62 | 0.19 | 64.81 | 1.75 | (Angola) |
| Eswatini | 64.26 | 61.32 | 67.11 | 5.79 | 53.49 | 6.36 | 59.85 | 0.01 | 59.86 | −1.63 | 58.23 | 4.80 | 63.03 | 1.10 | 64.12 | 0.14 | 64.26 | 4.41 | (Eswatini) |
| Guinea-Bissau | 64.25 | 61.82 | 66.55 | 4.73 | 59.48 | 2.69 | 62.16 | −0.82 | 61.34 | 0.31 | 61.65 | 1.95 | 63.60 | 0.48 | 64.08 | 0.17 | 64.25 | 2.09 | (Guinea-Bissau) |
| Cameroon | 63.97 | 61.78 | 66.22 | 4.45 | 59.13 | 2.56 | 61.70 | −0.02 | 61.67 | −0.53 | 61.15 | 1.30 | 62.44 | 1.26 | 63.70 | 0.27 | 63.97 | 2.27 | (Cameroon) |
| Equatorial Guinea | 63.91 | 62.22 | 65.89 | 3.66 | 60.23 | 2.07 | 62.30 | −0.16 | 62.14 | 0.31 | 62.45 | 0.91 | 63.35 | 0.35 | 63.71 | 0.20 | 63.91 | 1.61 | (Equatorial Guinea) |
| Madagascar | 63.84 | 62.12 | 65.60 | 3.48 | 63.26 | 0.24 | 63.50 | −0.80 | 62.71 | −0.19 | 62.52 | 0.55 | 63.07 | 0.56 | 63.63 | 0.20 | 63.84 | 0.33 | (Madagascar) |
| Kenya | 63.83 | 61.64 | 66.12 | 4.48 | 61.99 | 0.95 | 62.94 | −1.34 | 61.60 | −0.37 | 61.23 | 2.32 | 63.55 | 0.10 | 63.65 | 0.19 | 63.83 | 0.90 | (Kenya) |
| Burundi | 63.82 | 61.75 | 65.88 | 4.13 | 59.76 | 2.42 | 62.18 | 0.39 | 62.57 | −0.47 | 62.10 | 0.78 | 62.88 | 0.77 | 63.65 | 0.17 | 63.82 | 1.64 | (Burundi) |
| Mozambique | 63.80 | 60.49 | 66.74 | 6.26 | 57.97 | 3.34 | 61.31 | 0.08 | 61.39 | −1.12 | 60.27 | 2.74 | 63.01 | 0.60 | 63.61 | 0.19 | 63.80 | 2.49 | (Mozambique) |
| Zimbabwe | 63.06 | 60.49 | 65.31 | 4.82 | 58.11 | 2.95 | 61.06 | 0.47 | 61.53 | −1.40 | 60.13 | 2.23 | 62.36 | 0.41 | 62.77 | 0.29 | 63.06 | 2.00 | (Zimbabwe) |
| Togo | 62.94 | 62.70 | 63.15 | 0.46 | 58.78 | 2.28 | 61.06 | 0.08 | 61.14 | 0.20 | 61.34 | 0.95 | 62.29 | 0.45 | 62.74 | 0.20 | 62.94 | 1.87 | (Togo) |
| Liberia | 62.32 | 61.02 | 63.63 | 2.61 | 59.21 | 2.02 | 61.23 | 0.04 | 61.27 | −0.10 | 61.17 | 0.77 | 61.93 | 0.23 | 62.16 | 0.16 | 62.32 | 1.09 | (Liberia) |
| Cote d'Ivoire | 62.11 | 60.17 | 64.31 | 4.14 | 57.77 | 2.50 | 60.27 | −0.13 | 60.14 | 0.15 | 60.29 | 1.27 | 61.56 | 0.38 | 61.94 | 0.17 | 62.11 | 1.84 | (Ivory Coast) |
| DR Congo | 62.07 | 59.96 | 64.23 | 4.27 | 58.24 | 2.01 | 60.24 | 0.19 | 60.43 | −0.38 | 60.04 | 0.94 | 60.98 | 0.92 | 61.90 | 0.18 | 62.07 | 1.83 | (Democratic Republic of the Congo) |
| Sierra Leone | 61.96 | 60.23 | 63.70 | 3.47 | 54.28 | 5.31 | 59.59 | 0.10 | 59.69 | 0.57 | 60.26 | 1.02 | 61.27 | 0.51 | 61.79 | 0.18 | 61.96 | 2.37 | (Sierra Leone) |
| Niger | 61.43 | 60.49 | 62.41 | 1.92 | 58.69 | 1.34 | 60.03 | −0.14 | 59.89 | −0.35 | 59.54 | 0.86 | 60.40 | 0.78 | 61.18 | 0.25 | 61.43 | 1.40 | (Niger) |
| Burkina Faso | 61.29 | 59.11 | 63.43 | 4.32 | 58.33 | 1.85 | 60.18 | 0.27 | 60.45 | −0.41 | 60.05 | 0.65 | 60.70 | 0.39 | 61.09 | 0.20 | 61.29 | 1.11 | (Burkina Faso) |
| Benin | 60.96 | 59.52 | 62.42 | 2.90 | 59.01 | 0.88 | 59.89 | 0.27 | 60.15 | −0.54 | 59.61 | 0.87 | 60.48 | 0.30 | 60.77 | 0.19 | 60.96 | 1.07 | (Benin) |
| Guinea | 60.90 | 59.66 | 62.09 | 2.43 | 57.58 | 1.80 | 59.38 | −0.03 | 59.35 | 0.02 | 59.37 | 1.06 | 60.43 | 0.31 | 60.74 | 0.16 | 60.90 | 1.53 | (Guinea) |
| Mali | 60.67 | 59.25 | 62.15 | 2.90 | 57.48 | 1.73 | 59.22 | −0.36 | 58.86 | 0.26 | 59.12 | 0.92 | 60.03 | 0.40 | 60.44 | 0.24 | 60.67 | 1.46 | (Mali) |
| Somalia | 58.97 | 56.49 | 61.55 | 5.06 | 54.44 | 2.81 | 57.25 | −0.15 | 57.09 | −1.39 | 55.70 | −1.77 | 53.93 | 4.89 | 58.82 | 0.15 | 58.97 | 1.72 | (Somalia) |
| Lesotho | 57.80 | 55.03 | 60.44 | 5.41 | 50.79 | 4.46 | 55.25 | −0.12 | 55.13 | −0.92 | 54.21 | 2.60 | 56.81 | 0.56 | 57.38 | 0.42 | 57.80 | 2.55 | (Lesotho) |
| South Sudan | 57.74 | 54.76 | 60.75 | 5.99 | 45.62 | 12.50 | 58.13 | −0.48 | 57.65 | −0.60 | 57.05 | 0.16 | 57.20 | 0.41 | 57.62 | 0.12 | 57.74 | −0.39 | (South Sudan) |
| Central African Republic | 57.67 | 55.51 | 59.56 | 4.05 | 40.27 | −8.73 | 31.53 | 19.07 | 50.60 | −10.32 | 40.28 | −21.46 | 18.82 | 38.59 | 57.41 | 0.26 | 57.67 | 26.14 | (Central African Republic) |
| Chad | 55.24 | 53.36 | 57.19 | 3.83 | 51.14 | 1.85 | 52.99 | 0.09 | 53.08 | 0.05 | 53.14 | 1.39 | 54.53 | 0.54 | 55.07 | 0.17 | 55.24 | 2.24 | (Chad) |
| Nigeria | 54.63 | 54.33 | 54.94 | 0.61 | 51.94 | 1.07 | 53.01 | 0.06 | 53.07 | 0.38 | 53.45 | 0.62 | 54.08 | 0.38 | 54.46 | 0.17 | 54.63 | 1.63 | (Nigeria) |

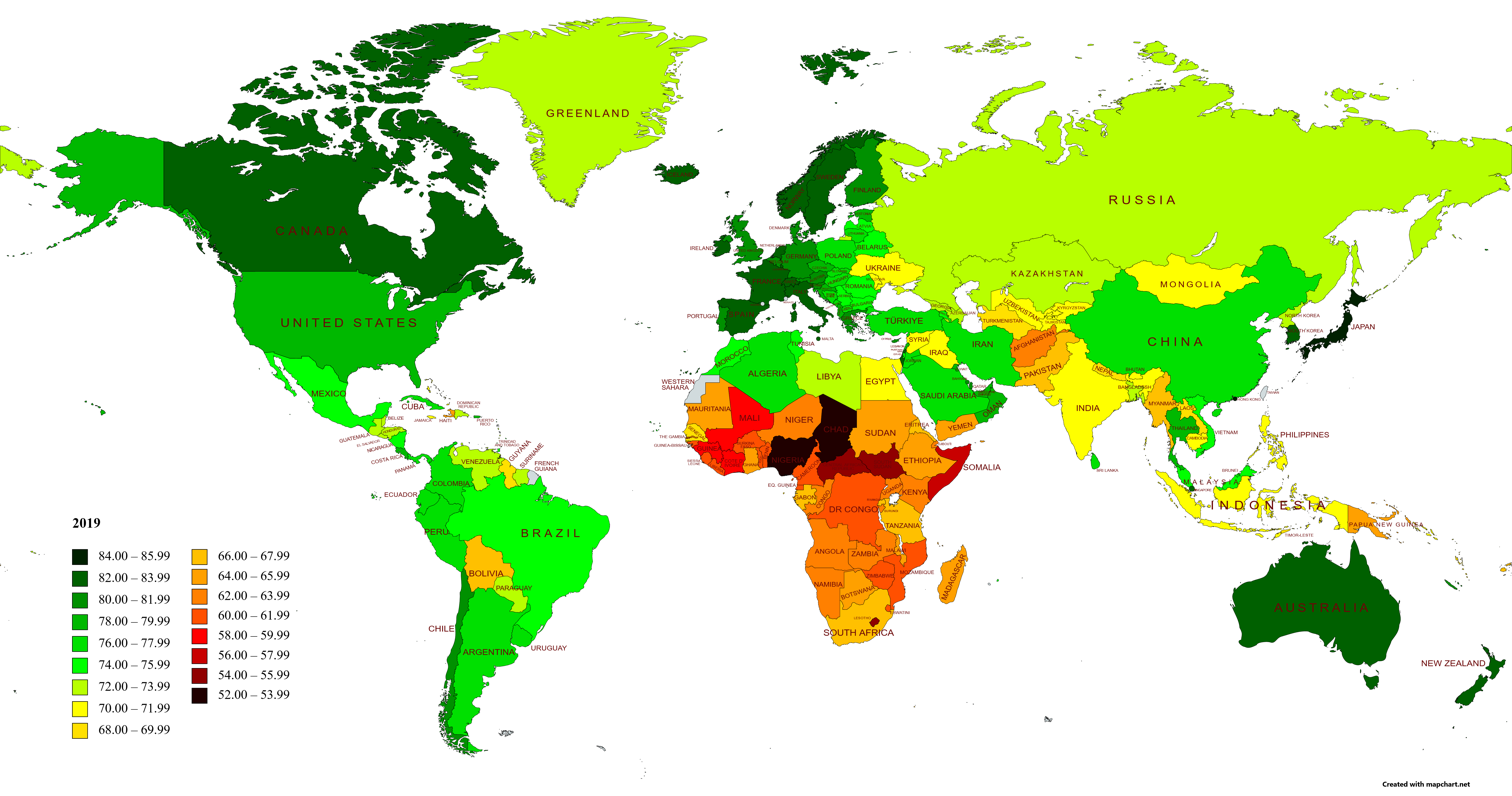
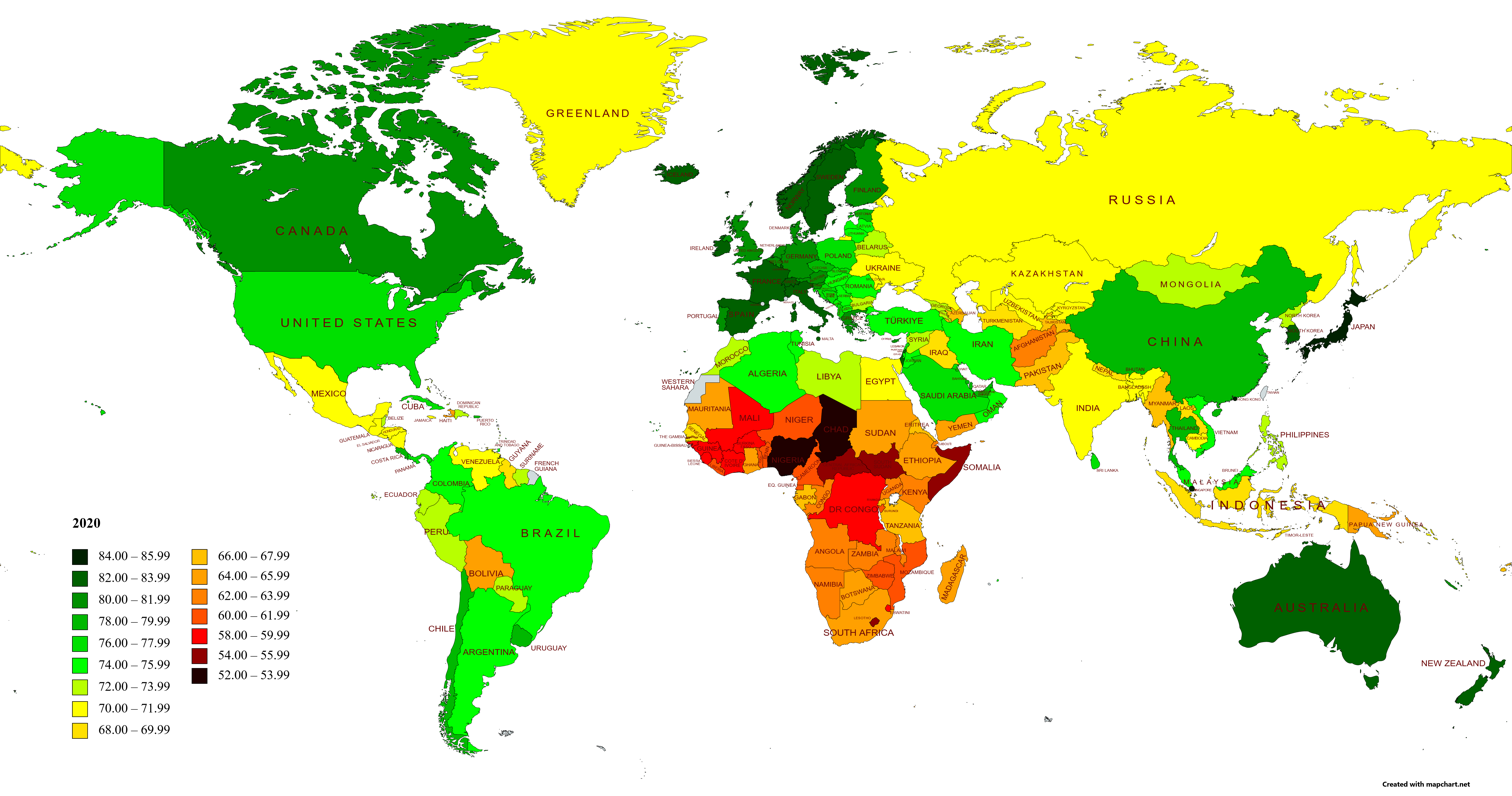
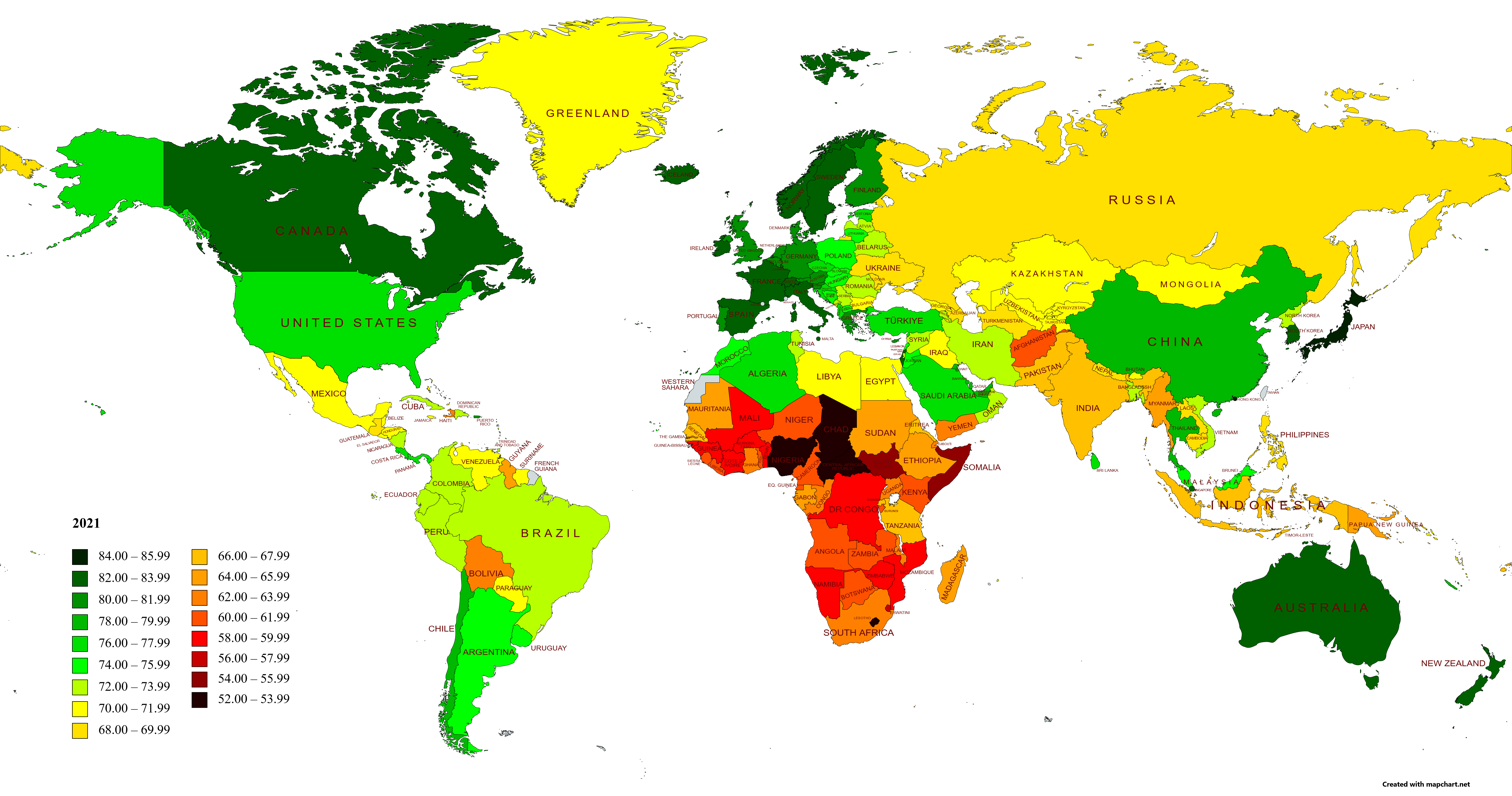
Global life expectancy, World Bank Group estimates, 2019–2021

== World Health Organization (2019) ==
According to data published by the World Health Organization. By default, data are sorted by life expectancy at birth for all population, and in case of equal values by HALE for all population.

World Health Organization (2019)
| Countries | Life expectancy at birth | | | | | HALE at birth | | | | | Life expectancy at age 60 | | | | | HALE at age 60 | | | | | |
| Countries | All | M | F | FΔM | Δ 2000 | All | M | F | FΔM | Δ 2000 | All | M | F | FΔM | Δ 2000 | All | M | F | FΔM | Δ 2000 | |
|---|---|---|---|---|---|---|---|---|---|---|---|---|---|---|---|---|---|---|---|---|---|
| Japan | 84.47 | 81.70 | 87.15 | 5.45 | 2.94 | 73.58 | 72.09 | 75.01 | 2.92 | 2.47 | 26.66 | 24.28 | 28.86 | 4.58 | 2.03 | 20.42 | 18.79 | 21.95 | 3.16 | 1.57 | (Japan) |
| Singapore | 83.90 | 81.81 | 85.98 | 4.17 | 5.38 | 73.80 | 72.66 | 74.89 | 2.23 | 4.39 | 25.83 | 24.05 | 27.51 | 3.46 | 4.35 | 20.21 | 18.98 | 21.38 | 2.40 | 3.41 | (Singapore) |
| South Korea | 83.69 | 80.56 | 86.56 | 6.00 | 7.83 | 72.50 | 70.62 | 74.19 | 3.57 | 5.95 | 26.13 | 23.55 | 28.30 | 4.75 | 5.80 | 19.66 | 17.88 | 21.16 | 3.28 | 4.13 | (South Korea) |
| Switzerland | 83.48 | 81.76 | 85.12 | 3.36 | 3.77 | 71.53 | 71.33 | 71.67 | 0.34 | 3.18 | 25.45 | 24.09 | 26.68 | 2.59 | 2.46 | 19.12 | 18.46 | 19.73 | 1.27 | 1.74 | (Switzerland) |
| Spain | 83.14 | 80.54 | 85.66 | 5.12 | 4.05 | 71.69 | 70.90 | 72.42 | 1.52 | 2.80 | 25.39 | 23.28 | 27.33 | 4.05 | 2.69 | 19.18 | 17.94 | 20.33 | 2.39 | 1.78 | (Spain) |
| Italy | 82.99 | 80.94 | 84.91 | 3.97 | 3.62 | 71.43 | 70.85 | 71.92 | 1.07 | 3.04 | 25.14 | 23.53 | 26.56 | 3.03 | 2.60 | 18.95 | 18.03 | 19.78 | 1.75 | 1.94 | (Italy) |
| Luxembourg | 82.80 | 80.83 | 84.74 | 3.91 | 4.38 | 71.46 | 70.98 | 71.89 | 0.91 | 3.61 | 24.73 | 23.13 | 26.22 | 3.09 | 2.85 | 18.83 | 17.97 | 19.64 | 1.67 | 2.10 | (Luxembourg) |
| Sweden | 82.71 | 81.17 | 84.24 | 3.07 | 3.14 | 71.41 | 71.33 | 71.46 | 0.13 | 2.15 | 24.78 | 23.57 | 25.91 | 2.34 | 2.36 | 18.80 | 18.26 | 19.32 | 1.06 | 1.57 | (Sweden) |
| Norway | 82.66 | 81.12 | 84.16 | 3.04 | 4.12 | 71.18 | 71.04 | 71.28 | 0.24 | 3.35 | 24.72 | 23.57 | 25.78 | 2.21 | 2.75 | 18.66 | 18.09 | 19.20 | 1.11 | 2.02 | (Norway) |
| Australia | 82.64 | 80.72 | 84.57 | 3.85 | 2.94 | 70.26 | 69.68 | 70.84 | 1.16 | 2.15 | 25.35 | 24.05 | 26.60 | 2.55 | 2.24 | 18.81 | 18.08 | 19.53 | 1.45 | 1.45 | (Australia) |
| Israel | 82.57 | 80.74 | 84.32 | 3.58 | 4.03 | 71.51 | 71.17 | 71.78 | 0.61 | 3.17 | 24.88 | 23.61 | 26.02 | 2.41 | 2.93 | 18.91 | 18.29 | 19.47 | 1.18 | 2.13 | (Israel) |
| France | 82.53 | 79.77 | 85.15 | 5.38 | 3.62 | 70.72 | 69.78 | 71.60 | 1.82 | 2.74 | 25.69 | 23.63 | 27.51 | 3.88 | 2.68 | 19.26 | 18.07 | 20.33 | 2.26 | 1.89 | (France) |
| Kuwait | 82.50 | 80.27 | 86.43 | 6.16 | 4.92 | 70.48 | 69.73 | 71.79 | 2.06 | 3.23 | 25.47 | 23.77 | 28.37 | 4.60 | 3.34 | 18.66 | 17.64 | 20.36 | 2.72 | 2.04 | (Kuwait) |
| Iceland | 82.47 | 81.10 | 83.90 | 2.80 | 2.78 | 71.39 | 71.30 | 71.46 | 0.16 | 2.25 | 24.82 | 23.96 | 25.67 | 1.71 | 2.20 | 19.07 | 18.68 | 19.45 | 0.77 | 1.70 | (Iceland) |
| Netherlands | 82.34 | 80.85 | 83.76 | 2.91 | 4.33 | 71.08 | 71.05 | 71.07 | 0.02 | 2.98 | 24.65 | 23.43 | 25.76 | 2.33 | 3.33 | 18.64 | 18.07 | 19.16 | 1.09 | 2.16 | (Netherlands) |
| Cyprus | 82.18 | 80.20 | 84.16 | 3.96 | 3.35 | 71.13 | 70.69 | 71.55 | 0.86 | 2.66 | 24.36 | 22.91 | 25.77 | 2.86 | 2.53 | 18.56 | 17.79 | 19.31 | 1.52 | 1.93 | (Cyprus) |
| Malta | 82.15 | 80.31 | 83.98 | 3.67 | 4.33 | 71.16 | 70.80 | 71.43 | 0.63 | 3.14 | 24.59 | 23.06 | 26.03 | 2.97 | 3.77 | 18.91 | 18.07 | 19.70 | 1.63 | 2.66 | (Malta) |
| Canada | 82.02 | 80.12 | 83.90 | 3.78 | 2.93 | 70.30 | 69.66 | 70.91 | 1.25 | 1.76 | 24.99 | 23.66 | 26.23 | 2.57 | 2.52 | 18.66 | 17.89 | 19.38 | 1.49 | 1.58 | (Canada) |
| Ireland | 81.94 | 80.27 | 83.60 | 3.33 | 5.52 | 70.48 | 70.25 | 70.71 | 0.46 | 4.16 | 24.26 | 23.00 | 25.48 | 2.48 | 4.07 | 18.53 | 17.90 | 19.14 | 1.24 | 2.97 | (Republic of Ireland) |
| New Zealand | 81.81 | 80.16 | 83.43 | 3.27 | 3.23 | 69.74 | 69.50 | 69.98 | 0.48 | 2.47 | 24.72 | 23.60 | 25.77 | 2.17 | 2.34 | 18.52 | 17.95 | 19.07 | 1.12 | 1.62 | (New Zealand) |
| Austria | 81.65 | 79.45 | 83.78 | 4.33 | 3.47 | 70.44 | 69.73 | 71.10 | 1.37 | 2.81 | 24.09 | 22.43 | 25.60 | 3.17 | 2.14 | 18.18 | 17.17 | 19.10 | 1.93 | 1.56 | (Austria) |
| Finland | 81.65 | 79.11 | 84.15 | 5.04 | 4.06 | 70.19 | 69.05 | 71.29 | 2.24 | 3.33 | 24.36 | 22.49 | 26.06 | 3.57 | 2.76 | 18.28 | 17.09 | 19.37 | 2.28 | 2.08 | (Finland) |
| Belgium | 81.61 | 79.50 | 83.66 | 4.16 | 3.94 | 70.10 | 69.61 | 70.55 | 0.94 | 2.89 | 24.23 | 22.60 | 25.72 | 3.12 | 2.59 | 18.18 | 17.34 | 18.96 | 1.62 | 1.73 | (Belgium) |
| United Arab Emirates | 81.41 | 80.98 | 82.29 | 1.31 | 3.29 | 69.69 | 70.24 | 68.69 | −1.55 | 2.24 | 23.55 | 23.52 | 23.68 | 0.16 | 2.17 | 17.29 | 17.59 | 16.95 | −0.64 | 1.39 | (United Arab Emirates) |
| Portugal | 81.37 | 78.38 | 84.15 | 5.77 | 4.78 | 70.06 | 68.81 | 71.20 | 2.39 | 4.01 | 24.20 | 21.97 | 26.15 | 4.18 | 2.98 | 18.40 | 17.04 | 19.60 | 2.56 | 2.25 | (Portugal) |
| Slovenia | 81.29 | 78.57 | 84.04 | 5.47 | 5.24 | 70.23 | 68.78 | 71.69 | 2.91 | 4.25 | 23.82 | 21.84 | 25.64 | 3.80 | 3.34 | 17.69 | 16.41 | 18.88 | 2.47 | 2.44 | (Slovenia) |
| Denmark | 81.28 | 79.49 | 83.06 | 3.57 | 4.35 | 70.31 | 69.86 | 70.75 | 0.89 | 3.65 | 23.55 | 22.18 | 24.85 | 2.67 | 2.92 | 18.10 | 17.33 | 18.84 | 1.51 | 2.30 | (Denmark) |
| United Kingdom | 81.22 | 79.50 | 82.92 | 3.42 | 3.36 | 69.74 | 69.38 | 70.07 | 0.69 | 2.46 | 24.12 | 22.91 | 25.25 | 2.34 | 2.81 | 18.25 | 17.64 | 18.82 | 1.18 | 1.96 | (United Kingdom) |
| Chile | 81.03 | 78.66 | 83.34 | 4.68 | 4.23 | 69.37 | 68.65 | 70.05 | 1.40 | 3.11 | 24.57 | 23.01 | 25.97 | 2.96 | 3.25 | 18.34 | 17.48 | 19.10 | 1.62 | 2.11 | (Chile) |
| Germany | 80.97 | 78.75 | 83.19 | 4.44 | 2.86 | 69.44 | 69.00 | 69.86 | 0.86 | 1.97 | 23.57 | 21.86 | 25.17 | 3.31 | 1.81 | 17.62 | 16.74 | 18.45 | 1.71 | 1.09 | (Germany) |
| Greece | 80.91 | 78.80 | 83.01 | 4.21 | 2.49 | 69.82 | 69.14 | 70.47 | 1.33 | 2.08 | 23.71 | 22.42 | 24.94 | 2.52 | 1.90 | 18.09 | 17.31 | 18.84 | 1.53 | 1.43 | (Greece) |
| Puerto Rico | 80.50 | 76.86 | 84.04 | 7.18 | 4.25 | 69.44 | 67.20 | 71.62 | 4.42 | 3.24 | 25.32 | 23.46 | 26.98 | 3.52 | 3.21 | 19.07 | 17.74 | 20.26 | 2.52 | 2.17 | (Puerto Rico) |
| Costa Rica | 80.30 | 77.93 | 82.71 | 4.78 | 2.13 | 69.21 | 68.09 | 70.35 | 2.26 | 1.38 | 24.52 | 23.11 | 25.85 | 2.74 | 1.97 | 18.37 | 17.49 | 19.20 | 1.71 | 1.25 | (Costa Rica) |
| Jordan | 79.79 | 79.73 | 80.34 | 0.61 | 7.07 | 68.36 | 69.59 | 67.32 | −2.27 | 5.11 | 23.48 | 24.08 | 23.36 | −0.72 | 4.75 | 17.33 | 18.03 | 16.95 | −1.08 | 3.17 | (Jordan) |
| Lebanon | 79.29 | 76.92 | 81.47 | 4.55 | 3.57 | 67.41 | 66.73 | 68.03 | 1.30 | 2.41 | 23.18 | 21.46 | 24.66 | 3.20 | 2.46 | 16.93 | 15.83 | 17.88 | 2.05 | 1.40 | (Lebanon) |
| Czech Republic | 79.14 | 76.30 | 81.93 | 5.63 | 4.11 | 68.49 | 66.92 | 70.01 | 3.09 | 3.18 | 22.08 | 19.93 | 24.00 | 4.07 | 2.75 | 16.32 | 14.87 | 17.62 | 2.75 | 1.92 | (Czech Republic) |
| Panama | 78.97 | 76.20 | 81.86 | 5.66 | 2.82 | 68.31 | 66.89 | 69.79 | 2.90 | 2.06 | 23.98 | 22.14 | 25.80 | 3.66 | 1.85 | 18.08 | 16.88 | 19.26 | 2.38 | 1.18 | (Panama) |
| Qatar | 78.90 | 78.49 | 79.84 | 1.35 | 8.52 | 67.91 | 68.37 | 66.54 | −1.83 | 6.15 | 21.83 | 21.76 | 21.86 | 0.10 | 6.65 | 15.83 | 16.07 | 15.34 | −0.73 | 4.41 | (Qatar) |
| Estonia | 78.89 | 74.69 | 82.61 | 7.92 | 7.92 | 68.37 | 65.80 | 70.59 | 4.79 | 6.52 | 22.50 | 19.20 | 24.96 | 5.76 | 3.89 | 16.93 | 14.66 | 18.63 | 3.97 | 2.87 | (Estonia) |
| Nicaragua | 78.87 | 76.30 | 81.27 | 4.97 | 2.69 | 67.68 | 66.26 | 69.00 | 2.74 | 2.39 | 24.50 | 23.23 | 25.51 | 2.28 | 0.46 | 18.19 | 17.38 | 18.83 | 1.45 | 0.22 | (Nicaragua) |
| USA | 78.74 | 76.53 | 80.98 | 4.45 | 2.08 | 66.02 | 65.13 | 66.93 | 1.80 | 0.70 | 23.24 | 21.99 | 24.41 | 2.42 | 1.90 | 16.59 | 15.82 | 17.31 | 1.49 | 0.92 | (United States) |
| Croatia | 78.60 | 75.58 | 81.59 | 6.01 | 3.85 | 68.38 | 66.66 | 70.07 | 3.41 | 3.15 | 21.87 | 19.71 | 23.79 | 4.08 | 2.50 | 16.34 | 14.92 | 17.61 | 2.69 | 1.79 | (Croatia) |
| Peru | 78.29 | 76.69 | 79.88 | 3.19 | 3.17 | 68.41 | 67.97 | 68.86 | 0.89 | 2.99 | 23.37 | 22.59 | 24.10 | 1.51 | 0.56 | 18.02 | 17.65 | 18.37 | 0.72 | 0.47 | (Peru) |
| Colombia | 77.95 | 75.33 | 80.55 | 5.22 | 5.41 | 67.90 | 66.44 | 69.34 | 2.90 | 4.58 | 22.69 | 21.20 | 24.03 | 2.83 | 2.40 | 17.41 | 16.42 | 18.31 | 1.89 | 1.80 | (Colombia) |
| Albania | 77.94 | 76.17 | 79.87 | 3.70 | 4.26 | 68.41 | 67.48 | 69.43 | 1.95 | 3.93 | 20.92 | 20.08 | 21.89 | 1.81 | 1.82 | 16.24 | 15.66 | 16.90 | 1.24 | 1.50 | (Albania) |
| Iran | 77.78 | 76.36 | 79.40 | 3.04 | 4.29 | 66.56 | 66.60 | 66.60 | 0.00 | 3.33 | 22.19 | 21.79 | 22.71 | 0.92 | 1.64 | 16.46 | 16.44 | 16.59 | 0.15 | 0.98 | (Iran) |
| Ecuador | 77.75 | 75.32 | 80.23 | 4.91 | 5.16 | 67.62 | 66.42 | 68.83 | 2.41 | 4.12 | 22.83 | 21.46 | 24.12 | 2.66 | 2.27 | 17.36 | 16.50 | 18.17 | 1.67 | 1.51 | (Ecuador) |
| Poland | 77.73 | 73.94 | 81.50 | 7.56 | 4.03 | 67.56 | 65.08 | 70.01 | 4.93 | 3.39 | 21.80 | 19.23 | 24.00 | 4.77 | 2.60 | 16.31 | 14.49 | 17.86 | 3.37 | 1.98 | (Poland) |
| Cuba | 77.66 | 75.30 | 80.12 | 4.82 | 0.91 | 67.80 | 66.74 | 68.88 | 2.14 | 0.78 | 21.57 | 19.96 | 23.15 | 3.19 | −0.04 | 16.55 | 15.53 | 17.55 | 2.02 | −0.17 | (Cuba) |
| Turkey | 77.62 | 75.09 | 80.13 | 5.04 | 4.31 | 67.24 | 66.63 | 67.80 | 1.17 | 3.61 | 21.26 | 19.46 | 22.85 | 3.39 | 0.94 | 16.03 | 15.03 | 16.93 | 1.90 | 0.61 | (Turkey) |
| Slovakia | 77.61 | 74.23 | 80.90 | 6.67 | 4.29 | 67.48 | 65.48 | 69.41 | 3.93 | 3.62 | 21.43 | 18.97 | 23.51 | 4.54 | 2.92 | 15.99 | 14.32 | 17.42 | 3.10 | 2.20 | (Slovakia) |
| Tunisia | 77.51 | 75.09 | 79.99 | 4.90 | 3.21 | 66.68 | 66.03 | 67.38 | 1.35 | 2.33 | 21.74 | 20.14 | 23.33 | 3.19 | 1.47 | 16.19 | 15.26 | 17.12 | 1.86 | 0.89 | (Tunisia) |
| Sri Lanka | 77.45 | 74.32 | 80.33 | 6.01 | 5.94 | 67.09 | 65.35 | 68.69 | 3.34 | 4.69 | 21.76 | 19.93 | 23.19 | 3.26 | 2.58 | 16.05 | 14.97 | 16.90 | 1.93 | 1.66 | (Sri Lanka) |
| China | 77.31 | 74.58 | 80.36 | 5.78 | 6.47 | 68.45 | 66.99 | 70.08 | 3.09 | 5.32 | 20.98 | 19.09 | 22.98 | 3.89 | 3.02 | 16.06 | 14.98 | 17.21 | 2.23 | 2.08 | (China) |
| Bosnia and Herzegovina | 77.10 | 74.64 | 79.56 | 4.92 | 1.64 | 67.01 | 65.67 | 68.35 | 2.68 | 1.43 | 20.54 | 18.85 | 22.07 | 3.22 | 0.75 | 15.37 | 14.26 | 16.37 | 2.11 | 0.48 | (Bosnia and Herzegovina) |
| Argentina | 77.02 | 74.00 | 79.91 | 5.91 | 2.73 | 66.90 | 65.43 | 68.27 | 2.84 | 2.17 | 21.59 | 19.24 | 23.64 | 4.40 | 1.28 | 16.50 | 14.99 | 17.81 | 2.82 | 0.86 | (Argentina) |
| Uruguay | 77.01 | 73.36 | 80.50 | 7.14 | 2.13 | 66.81 | 64.91 | 68.60 | 3.69 | 1.47 | 21.71 | 18.95 | 24.04 | 5.09 | 1.02 | 16.51 | 14.71 | 18.02 | 3.31 | 0.59 | (Uruguay) |
| Saudi Arabia | 76.93 | 76.45 | 77.75 | 1.30 | 6.36 | 66.15 | 66.37 | 65.63 | −0.74 | 4.94 | 20.65 | 20.67 | 20.69 | 0.02 | 3.38 | 15.16 | 15.22 | 15.09 | −0.13 | 2.28 | (Saudi Arabia) |
| Thailand | 76.92 | 73.30 | 80.64 | 7.34 | 5.91 | 67.14 | 64.85 | 69.50 | 4.65 | 4.93 | 23.43 | 21.99 | 24.74 | 2.75 | 2.71 | 17.68 | 16.82 | 18.46 | 1.64 | 1.94 | (Thailand) |
| Montenegro | 76.84 | 73.89 | 79.73 | 5.84 | 3.41 | 67.25 | 65.61 | 68.85 | 3.24 | 2.82 | 20.25 | 18.04 | 22.24 | 4.20 | 1.31 | 15.39 | 13.89 | 16.74 | 2.85 | 0.91 | (Montenegro) |
| Brunei | 76.68 | 75.25 | 78.16 | 2.91 | 1.17 | 67.08 | 66.34 | 67.82 | 1.48 | 0.79 | 20.92 | 20.07 | 21.72 | 1.65 | 1.34 | 15.82 | 15.20 | 16.39 | 1.19 | 0.96 | (Brunei) |
| Algeria | 76.55 | 76.24 | 77.08 | 0.84 | 4.08 | 66.14 | 67.04 | 65.34 | −1.70 | 3.20 | 21.43 | 21.62 | 21.47 | −0.15 | 1.39 | 16.09 | 16.45 | 15.89 | −0.56 | 0.82 | (Algeria) |
| Hungary | 76.34 | 72.98 | 79.52 | 6.54 | 4.98 | 66.59 | 64.67 | 68.39 | 3.72 | 4.37 | 20.21 | 17.72 | 22.27 | 4.55 | 2.25 | 15.17 | 13.48 | 16.56 | 3.08 | 1.84 | (Hungary) |
| Lithuania | 76.25 | 71.45 | 80.82 | 9.37 | 4.25 | 66.23 | 63.10 | 69.17 | 6.07 | 3.67 | 21.22 | 17.87 | 23.80 | 5.93 | 1.79 | 15.84 | 13.41 | 17.70 | 4.29 | 1.29 | (Lithuania) |
| North Macedonia | 76.15 | 76.25 | 76.92 | 0.67 | 3.20 | 66.65 | 67.25 | 66.65 | −0.60 | 2.75 | 19.32 | 20.37 | 19.23 | −1.14 | 1.54 | 14.61 | 15.47 | 14.42 | −1.05 | 1.15 | (North Macedonia) |
| Saint Lucia | 76.12 | 72.53 | 79.93 | 7.40 | 2.90 | 65.71 | 63.71 | 67.84 | 4.13 | 2.18 | 22.16 | 19.63 | 24.67 | 5.04 | 2.18 | 16.73 | 14.96 | 18.49 | 3.53 | 1.51 | (Saint Lucia) |
| Barbados | 76.04 | 74.33 | 77.61 | 3.28 | 1.43 | 66.29 | 65.76 | 66.76 | 1.00 | 1.00 | 20.94 | 19.97 | 21.74 | 1.77 | 0.30 | 16.07 | 15.48 | 16.56 | 1.08 | 0.05 | (Barbados) |
| Bahrain | 76.03 | 75.39 | 76.86 | 1.47 | 6.34 | 65.80 | 66.30 | 64.72 | −1.58 | 4.75 | 19.06 | 18.58 | 19.58 | 1.00 | 4.21 | 14.03 | 13.94 | 14.08 | 0.14 | 2.78 | (Bahrain) |
| Serbia | 75.92 | 73.26 | 78.46 | 5.20 | 4.42 | 66.55 | 65.08 | 67.94 | 2.86 | 3.65 | 19.73 | 17.93 | 21.23 | 3.30 | 2.62 | 14.96 | 13.76 | 15.97 | 2.21 | 1.87 | (Serbia) |
| Mexico | 75.83 | 72.80 | 78.89 | 6.09 | 1.61 | 65.46 | 63.92 | 67.02 | 3.10 | 1.36 | 22.20 | 21.03 | 23.30 | 2.27 | 0.76 | 16.53 | 15.86 | 17.16 | 1.30 | 0.60 | (Mexico) |
| Azerbaijan | 75.80 | 73.38 | 78.09 | 4.71 | 10.57 | 66.62 | 65.57 | 67.63 | 2.06 | 8.81 | 20.86 | 19.55 | 21.95 | 2.40 | 4.86 | 16.15 | 15.49 | 16.72 | 1.23 | 3.54 | (Azerbaijan) |
| Latvia | 75.68 | 71.05 | 79.97 | 8.92 | 5.47 | 66.02 | 63.05 | 68.74 | 5.69 | 4.82 | 20.77 | 17.44 | 23.26 | 5.82 | 2.46 | 15.60 | 13.24 | 17.37 | 4.13 | 1.87 | (Latvia) |
| Armenia | 75.67 | 70.82 | 79.79 | 8.97 | 4.05 | 66.48 | 63.56 | 68.96 | 5.40 | 3.51 | 20.10 | 16.81 | 22.61 | 5.80 | 2.12 | 15.45 | 13.30 | 17.09 | 3.79 | 1.56 | (Armenia) |
| Antigua and Barbuda | 75.66 | 74.05 | 77.07 | 3.02 | 1.27 | 65.78 | 65.16 | 66.31 | 1.15 | 0.89 | 20.14 | 19.28 | 20.79 | 1.51 | 0.20 | 15.35 | 14.74 | 15.80 | 1.06 | −0.04 | (Antigua and Barbuda) |
| Brazil | 75.48 | 72.22 | 78.73 | 6.51 | 3.98 | 64.53 | 62.96 | 66.07 | 3.11 | 3.61 | 21.32 | 19.58 | 22.84 | 3.26 | 1.54 | 15.81 | 14.74 | 16.74 | 2.00 | 1.13 | (Brazil) |
| Romania | 75.46 | 71.78 | 79.23 | 7.45 | 4.32 | 66.18 | 63.77 | 68.64 | 4.87 | 3.89 | 20.21 | 17.74 | 22.37 | 4.63 | 2.02 | 15.45 | 13.64 | 17.04 | 3.40 | 1.53 | (Romania) |
| Maldives | 75.45 | 74.41 | 76.86 | 2.45 | 5.63 | 66.93 | 66.91 | 66.89 | −0.02 | 5.54 | 17.90 | 17.32 | 18.64 | 1.32 | 0.84 | 14.08 | 13.82 | 14.41 | 0.59 | 0.86 | (Maldives) |
| Oman | 75.29 | 73.09 | 78.85 | 5.76 | 3.63 | 65.53 | 64.58 | 66.76 | 2.18 | 2.99 | 19.51 | 17.83 | 21.90 | 4.07 | 1.78 | 14.56 | 13.49 | 16.09 | 2.60 | 1.26 | (Oman) |
| Paraguay | 75.08 | 72.18 | 78.16 | 5.98 | 0.40 | 64.87 | 63.47 | 66.38 | 2.91 | 0.46 | 21.01 | 19.22 | 22.82 | 3.60 | −1.09 | 15.88 | 14.73 | 17.04 | 2.31 | −0.85 | (Paraguay) |
| Bulgaria | 75.00 | 71.52 | 78.62 | 7.10 | 3.36 | 65.67 | 63.46 | 67.95 | 4.49 | 2.91 | 19.70 | 17.24 | 21.92 | 4.68 | 2.10 | 14.99 | 13.25 | 16.55 | 3.30 | 1.58 | (Bulgaria) |
| Belize | 74.87 | 72.55 | 77.38 | 4.83 | 4.77 | 65.19 | 64.05 | 66.45 | 2.40 | 3.59 | 21.69 | 20.81 | 22.65 | 1.84 | 3.17 | 16.68 | 16.13 | 17.28 | 1.15 | 2.17 | (Belize) |
| Belarus | 74.82 | 69.73 | 79.66 | 9.93 | 6.03 | 65.44 | 62.14 | 68.56 | 6.42 | 5.23 | 19.67 | 16.07 | 22.49 | 6.42 | 2.55 | 14.88 | 12.30 | 16.90 | 4.60 | 1.93 | (Belarus) |
| Malaysia | 74.68 | 72.71 | 76.99 | 4.28 | 1.67 | 65.49 | 64.68 | 66.47 | 1.79 | 1.36 | 19.80 | 18.97 | 20.79 | 1.82 | 1.48 | 14.90 | 14.50 | 15.42 | 0.92 | 1.07 | (Malaysia) |
| El Salvador | 74.28 | 69.48 | 78.73 | 9.25 | 2.63 | 64.39 | 60.89 | 67.62 | 6.73 | 2.37 | 22.01 | 20.20 | 23.48 | 3.28 | 1.18 | 16.68 | 15.34 | 17.77 | 2.43 | 0.74 | (El Salvador) |
| Trinidad and Tobago | 74.09 | 70.71 | 77.54 | 6.83 | 3.67 | 64.07 | 62.06 | 66.11 | 4.05 | 2.68 | 21.44 | 19.58 | 23.05 | 3.47 | 2.60 | 16.17 | 14.85 | 17.31 | 2.46 | 1.73 | (Trinidad and Tobago) |
| Cape Verde | 74.06 | 69.71 | 78.23 | 8.52 | 2.36 | 64.76 | 62.30 | 67.06 | 4.76 | 2.32 | 19.59 | 16.54 | 21.95 | 5.41 | −1.09 | 14.91 | 12.93 | 16.44 | 3.51 | −0.90 | (Cape Verde) |
| Mauritius | 74.06 | 70.83 | 77.43 | 6.60 | 2.92 | 64.25 | 62.46 | 66.12 | 3.66 | 2.06 | 20.40 | 18.56 | 22.09 | 3.53 | 2.59 | 15.08 | 13.99 | 16.08 | 2.09 | 1.65 | (Mauritius) |
| Bangladesh | 73.95 | 72.64 | 75.26 | 2.62 | 8.59 | 63.98 | 64.12 | 63.86 | −0.26 | 7.32 | 20.56 | 19.92 | 21.18 | 1.26 | 3.18 | 15.42 | 15.35 | 15.49 | 0.14 | 2.32 | (Bangladesh) |
| Bhutan | 73.93 | 72.87 | 75.13 | 2.26 | 7.94 | 64.13 | 64.19 | 64.04 | −0.15 | 6.89 | 20.12 | 19.66 | 20.61 | 0.95 | 1.88 | 15.20 | 15.15 | 15.25 | 0.10 | 1.37 | (Bhutan) |
| Dominican Republic | 73.91 | 70.87 | 77.18 | 6.31 | 0.51 | 64.14 | 62.41 | 66.01 | 3.60 | 0.38 | 22.60 | 21.24 | 23.94 | 2.70 | 0.11 | 17.23 | 16.31 | 18.13 | 1.82 | −0.09 | (Dominican Republic) |
| Georgia | 73.85 | 69.10 | 78.44 | 9.34 | 2.78 | 64.85 | 61.61 | 67.98 | 6.37 | 2.08 | 19.05 | 16.01 | 21.50 | 5.49 | 0.98 | 14.60 | 12.47 | 16.31 | 3.84 | 0.51 | (Georgia (country)) |
| Tajikistan | 73.81 | 72.28 | 75.37 | 3.09 | 8.16 | 64.91 | 64.42 | 65.42 | 1.00 | 7.12 | 20.10 | 19.57 | 20.62 | 1.05 | 2.73 | 15.67 | 15.54 | 15.80 | 0.26 | 2.07 | (Tajikistan) |
| Morocco | 73.75 | 72.85 | 74.64 | 1.79 | 3.56 | 63.60 | 64.13 | 63.04 | −1.09 | 2.91 | 18.97 | 18.32 | 19.59 | 1.27 | −0.09 | 14.15 | 13.92 | 14.36 | 0.44 | −0.32 | (Morocco) |
| Vietnam | 73.71 | 69.51 | 78.00 | 8.49 | 1.84 | 65.39 | 62.68 | 68.16 | 5.48 | 1.65 | 19.55 | 16.82 | 21.96 | 5.14 | 0.64 | 15.12 | 13.28 | 16.74 | 3.46 | 0.40 | (Vietnam) |
| Kyrgyzstan | 73.59 | 69.92 | 77.14 | 7.22 | 7.66 | 64.84 | 62.68 | 66.93 | 4.25 | 6.73 | 19.46 | 17.19 | 21.40 | 4.21 | 2.91 | 15.13 | 13.69 | 16.37 | 2.68 | 2.29 | (Kyrgyzstan) |
| Libya | 73.54 | 71.47 | 75.70 | 4.23 | −0.50 | 63.36 | 62.73 | 63.99 | 1.26 | −0.87 | 19.90 | 19.10 | 20.63 | 1.53 | −1.02 | 14.76 | 14.36 | 15.13 | 0.77 | −1.08 | (Libya) |
| Moldova | 73.32 | 69.32 | 77.17 | 7.85 | 7.66 | 64.43 | 62.01 | 66.75 | 4.74 | 6.41 | 19.02 | 16.63 | 20.92 | 4.29 | 4.09 | 14.49 | 12.87 | 15.79 | 2.92 | 3.01 | (Moldova) |
| Russia | 73.22 | 68.17 | 78.00 | 9.83 | 8.06 | 63.72 | 60.41 | 66.84 | 6.43 | 7.01 | 19.93 | 16.80 | 22.19 | 5.39 | 3.54 | 14.92 | 12.75 | 16.49 | 3.74 | 2.64 | (Russia) |
| Kazakhstan | 73.20 | 68.84 | 77.20 | 8.36 | 8.85 | 63.97 | 61.26 | 66.45 | 5.19 | 7.60 | 19.15 | 16.43 | 21.16 | 4.73 | 3.25 | 14.49 | 12.75 | 15.77 | 3.02 | 2.39 | (Kazakhstan) |
| Seychelles | 73.12 | 70.08 | 76.65 | 6.57 | 1.01 | 64.31 | 62.52 | 66.37 | 3.85 | 0.62 | 19.38 | 17.51 | 21.23 | 3.72 | 0.19 | 14.54 | 13.34 | 15.75 | 2.41 | −0.12 | (Seychelles) |
| World | 73.12 | 70.61 | 75.70 | 5.09 | 6.35 | 63.45 | 62.33 | 64.59 | 2.26 | 5.33 | 21.03 | 19.41 | 22.54 | 3.13 | 2.16 | 15.80 | 14.87 | 16.67 | 1.80 | 1.52 | |
| St. Vincent and the Grenadines | 73.11 | 70.76 | 75.82 | 5.06 | 1.45 | 63.49 | 62.21 | 64.98 | 2.77 | 0.95 | 20.51 | 19.45 | 21.71 | 2.26 | 1.05 | 15.52 | 14.74 | 16.39 | 1.65 | 0.58 | (Saint Vincent and the Grenadines) |
| Suriname | 73.02 | 69.99 | 76.10 | 6.11 | 2.46 | 63.12 | 61.48 | 64.76 | 3.28 | 1.74 | 20.69 | 18.80 | 22.31 | 3.51 | 1.10 | 15.62 | 14.30 | 16.74 | 2.44 | 0.59 | (Suriname) |
| Ukraine | 73.00 | 67.99 | 77.81 | 9.82 | 5.45 | 63.47 | 60.10 | 66.70 | 6.60 | 4.68 | 19.49 | 16.43 | 21.73 | 5.30 | 2.72 | 14.66 | 12.53 | 16.21 | 3.68 | 2.14 | (Ukraine) |
| Tonga | 72.94 | 70.38 | 75.60 | 5.22 | 1.99 | 64.05 | 62.97 | 65.21 | 2.24 | 1.34 | 19.04 | 17.41 | 20.65 | 3.24 | 1.15 | 14.44 | 13.55 | 15.32 | 1.77 | 0.70 | (Tonga) |
| Bolivia | 72.92 | 72.03 | 73.79 | 1.76 | 6.83 | 63.64 | 63.72 | 63.54 | −0.18 | 5.87 | 19.42 | 19.07 | 19.71 | 0.64 | 1.62 | 14.79 | 14.69 | 14.88 | 0.19 | 1.10 | (Bolivia) |
| Iraq | 72.90 | 70.26 | 75.37 | 5.11 | 3.42 | 62.41 | 61.17 | 63.52 | 2.35 | 2.72 | 19.63 | 18.02 | 20.91 | 2.89 | 0.65 | 14.50 | 13.42 | 15.36 | 1.94 | 0.26 | (Iraq) |
| Grenada | 72.73 | 70.46 | 75.32 | 4.86 | 1.14 | 63.36 | 62.26 | 64.67 | 2.41 | 0.72 | 18.39 | 16.72 | 20.26 | 3.54 | 0.95 | 14.05 | 12.87 | 15.37 | 2.50 | 0.56 | (Grenada) |
| Venezuela | 72.71 | 68.38 | 77.35 | 8.97 | −1.32 | 63.40 | 60.57 | 66.43 | 5.86 | −0.98 | 20.67 | 18.52 | 22.64 | 4.12 | −0.54 | 15.77 | 14.31 | 17.11 | 2.80 | −0.39 | (Venezuela) |
| Guatemala | 72.71 | 70.19 | 75.20 | 5.01 | 4.40 | 62.54 | 61.18 | 63.88 | 2.70 | 3.84 | 20.65 | 19.76 | 21.45 | 1.69 | 0.89 | 15.39 | 14.84 | 15.89 | 1.05 | 0.51 | (Guatemala) |
| North Korea | 72.32 | 69.34 | 75.30 | 5.96 | 9.80 | 64.51 | 62.89 | 66.15 | 3.26 | 8.63 | 18.86 | 17.04 | 20.39 | 3.35 | 2.37 | 14.71 | 13.64 | 15.64 | 2.00 | 1.83 | (North Korea) |
| Uzbekistan | 72.27 | 70.15 | 74.28 | 4.13 | 10.59 | 63.62 | 62.85 | 64.32 | 1.47 | 8.92 | 17.82 | 16.51 | 18.89 | 2.38 | 4.45 | 13.80 | 13.06 | 14.40 | 1.34 | 3.30 | (Uzbekistan) |
| Jamaica | 72.24 | 69.48 | 75.14 | 5.66 | −0.01 | 63.55 | 62.11 | 65.08 | 2.97 | −0.06 | 18.66 | 16.94 | 20.39 | 3.45 | 0.04 | 14.57 | 13.37 | 15.78 | 2.41 | −0.06 | (Jamaica) |
| Sao Tome and Principe | 71.66 | 70.16 | 73.18 | 3.02 | 8.53 | 62.95 | 62.80 | 63.09 | 0.29 | 7.43 | 17.77 | 16.82 | 18.69 | 1.87 | 0.83 | 13.62 | 13.21 | 14.02 | 0.81 | 0.58 | (São Tomé and Príncipe) |
| Egypt | 71.59 | 68.97 | 74.30 | 5.33 | 2.44 | 62.52 | 61.66 | 63.40 | 1.74 | 2.10 | 17.18 | 15.30 | 18.94 | 3.64 | −0.66 | 13.02 | 11.93 | 14.05 | 2.12 | −0.65 | (Egypt) |
| Honduras | 71.44 | 69.99 | 72.90 | 2.91 | 1.68 | 62.35 | 61.85 | 62.85 | 1.00 | 1.60 | 18.13 | 17.36 | 18.84 | 1.48 | −1.17 | 13.76 | 13.26 | 14.23 | 0.97 | −0.96 | (Honduras) |
| Indonesia | 71.40 | 69.55 | 73.26 | 3.71 | 4.19 | 63.29 | 62.48 | 64.09 | 1.61 | 3.86 | 18.06 | 16.96 | 19.04 | 2.08 | 0.71 | 13.79 | 13.17 | 14.34 | 1.17 | 0.55 | (Indonesia) |
| Nepal | 71.36 | 69.56 | 73.10 | 3.54 | 5.99 | 61.53 | 61.01 | 62.08 | 1.07 | 5.47 | 18.60 | 17.64 | 19.51 | 1.87 | 0.81 | 13.73 | 13.32 | 14.12 | 0.80 | 0.73 | (Nepal) |
| Mongolia | 70.75 | 66.27 | 75.47 | 9.20 | 7.55 | 62.00 | 58.89 | 65.28 | 6.39 | 6.36 | 18.49 | 16.11 | 20.52 | 4.41 | 3.34 | 14.21 | 12.55 | 15.62 | 3.07 | 2.45 | (Mongolia) |
| Bahamas | 70.74 | 68.08 | 73.26 | 5.18 | −0.23 | 61.78 | 60.38 | 63.11 | 2.73 | −0.44 | 20.20 | 18.68 | 21.50 | 2.82 | 0.15 | 15.54 | 14.48 | 16.44 | 1.96 | −0.04 | (The Bahamas) |
| India | 70.73 | 69.18 | 72.41 | 3.23 | 7.53 | 60.88 | 60.70 | 61.08 | 0.38 | 6.75 | 18.52 | 17.60 | 19.44 | 1.84 | 1.01 | 13.60 | 13.27 | 13.94 | 0.67 | 0.90 | (India) |
| Mauritania | 70.18 | 70.00 | 70.38 | 0.38 | 7.26 | 61.59 | 62.49 | 60.82 | −1.67 | 6.38 | 18.63 | 18.89 | 18.39 | −0.50 | 1.61 | 14.45 | 14.95 | 14.01 | −0.94 | 1.27 | (Mauritania) |
| Samoa | 69.99 | 68.77 | 71.31 | 2.54 | 0.39 | 61.42 | 61.11 | 61.77 | 0.66 | 0.16 | 17.64 | 17.22 | 18.06 | 0.84 | 0.56 | 13.30 | 13.20 | 13.41 | 0.21 | 0.32 | (Samoa) |
| Cambodia | 69.56 | 66.87 | 72.16 | 5.29 | 10.46 | 61.25 | 59.77 | 62.68 | 2.91 | 9.47 | 17.32 | 15.72 | 18.57 | 2.85 | 2.00 | 13.16 | 12.16 | 13.93 | 1.77 | 1.49 | (Cambodia) |
| Sudan | 69.47 | 68.35 | 70.55 | 2.20 | 6.98 | 60.11 | 60.26 | 59.98 | −0.28 | 5.98 | 19.04 | 18.65 | 19.39 | 0.74 | 1.68 | 14.42 | 14.32 | 14.52 | 0.20 | 1.20 | (Sudan) |
| Philippines | 69.43 | 66.05 | 73.22 | 7.17 | −0.54 | 61.26 | 59.28 | 63.47 | 4.19 | 0.01 | 17.48 | 15.45 | 19.52 | 4.07 | −1.39 | 13.34 | 12.06 | 14.63 | 2.57 | −0.90 | (Philippines) |
| Syria | 69.17 | 65.37 | 73.49 | 8.12 | −1.92 | 59.66 | 57.46 | 62.21 | 4.75 | −2.42 | 18.71 | 18.19 | 19.31 | 1.12 | 1.40 | 14.19 | 14.05 | 14.41 | 0.36 | 0.86 | (Syria) |
| Turkmenistan | 69.14 | 65.70 | 72.54 | 6.84 | 3.57 | 61.13 | 59.04 | 63.20 | 4.16 | 3.30 | 18.23 | 16.33 | 19.79 | 3.46 | 0.97 | 14.24 | 13.02 | 15.23 | 2.21 | 0.75 | (Turkmenistan) |
| Ethiopia | 68.85 | 67.17 | 70.54 | 3.37 | 18.06 | 59.93 | 59.20 | 60.67 | 1.47 | 15.48 | 18.67 | 17.89 | 19.39 | 1.50 | 5.23 | 14.05 | 13.67 | 14.40 | 0.73 | 3.94 | (Ethiopia) |
| Myanmar | 68.81 | 65.69 | 72.04 | 6.35 | 9.43 | 60.66 | 58.83 | 62.56 | 3.73 | 8.24 | 17.92 | 16.06 | 19.61 | 3.55 | 3.12 | 13.61 | 12.42 | 14.69 | 2.27 | 2.29 | (Myanmar) |
| Senegal | 68.76 | 67.08 | 70.28 | 3.20 | 10.15 | 59.87 | 59.62 | 60.11 | 0.49 | 8.92 | 17.90 | 17.08 | 18.55 | 1.47 | 1.34 | 13.54 | 13.23 | 13.78 | 0.55 | 0.99 | (Senegal) |
| Guyana | 68.73 | 65.58 | 71.99 | 6.41 | 4.08 | 59.14 | 57.25 | 61.11 | 3.86 | 3.19 | 18.01 | 16.52 | 19.40 | 2.88 | 1.56 | 13.43 | 12.42 | 14.39 | 1.97 | 1.02 | (Guyana) |
| Timor-Leste | 68.50 | 67.02 | 70.08 | 3.06 | 5.63 | 59.97 | 58.96 | 61.07 | 2.11 | 5.99 | 17.96 | 17.25 | 18.65 | 1.40 | 0.02 | 13.55 | 13.14 | 13.95 | 0.81 | 0.25 | (Timor-Leste) |
| Laos | 68.36 | 66.14 | 70.72 | 4.58 | 10.08 | 60.60 | 59.43 | 61.84 | 2.41 | 8.87 | 17.48 | 16.35 | 18.63 | 2.28 | 2.76 | 13.53 | 12.88 | 14.19 | 1.31 | 2.06 | (Laos) |
| Comoros | 68.10 | 66.80 | 69.43 | 2.63 | 6.06 | 59.76 | 59.44 | 60.07 | 0.63 | 5.47 | 18.05 | 17.58 | 18.49 | 0.91 | 1.96 | 13.82 | 13.64 | 13.99 | 0.35 | 1.48 | (Comoros) |
| Fiji | 67.87 | 65.78 | 70.09 | 4.31 | 2.04 | 59.67 | 58.64 | 60.77 | 2.13 | 1.54 | 16.01 | 14.71 | 17.27 | 2.56 | 1.47 | 11.96 | 11.13 | 12.76 | 1.63 | 0.94 | (Fiji) |
| Rwanda | 67.76 | 65.65 | 69.62 | 3.97 | 20.87 | 59.10 | 58.15 | 59.93 | 1.78 | 18.34 | 17.82 | 16.50 | 18.83 | 2.33 | 5.14 | 13.66 | 12.87 | 14.27 | 1.40 | 3.96 | (Rwanda) |
| Vanuatu | 67.13 | 64.12 | 70.64 | 6.52 | 2.20 | 59.38 | 57.62 | 61.43 | 3.81 | 1.89 | 16.18 | 15.05 | 17.63 | 2.58 | 0.93 | 12.47 | 11.80 | 13.31 | 1.51 | 0.67 | (Vanuatu) |
| Pakistan | 67.03 | 66.30 | 67.79 | 1.49 | 5.62 | 57.80 | 58.12 | 57.50 | −0.62 | 4.61 | 18.01 | 17.90 | 18.11 | 0.21 | 1.67 | 13.28 | 13.51 | 13.07 | −0.44 | 1.12 | (Pakistan) |
| Yemen | 66.90 | 63.95 | 70.01 | 6.06 | 3.82 | 57.36 | 56.40 | 58.35 | 1.95 | 3.21 | 17.98 | 17.01 | 18.81 | 1.80 | 1.12 | 13.56 | 13.17 | 13.90 | 0.73 | 0.76 | (Yemen) |
| Tanzania | 66.79 | 65.20 | 68.37 | 3.17 | 14.00 | 58.31 | 57.97 | 58.68 | 0.71 | 12.39 | 18.05 | 17.23 | 18.79 | 1.56 | 2.62 | 13.80 | 13.44 | 14.12 | 0.68 | 2.02 | (Tanzania) |
| Papua New Guinea | 66.67 | 65.57 | 67.92 | 2.35 | 3.31 | 58.47 | 58.09 | 58.92 | 0.83 | 2.90 | 16.77 | 16.34 | 17.28 | 0.94 | 0.75 | 12.68 | 12.48 | 12.92 | 0.44 | 0.51 | (Papua New Guinea) |
| Kenya | 66.50 | 64.07 | 68.99 | 4.92 | 12.41 | 58.25 | 57.12 | 59.40 | 2.28 | 11.10 | 17.37 | 15.81 | 18.80 | 2.99 | 0.66 | 13.16 | 12.24 | 13.99 | 1.75 | 0.72 | (Kenya) |
| Uganda | 66.09 | 62.82 | 69.31 | 6.49 | 17.20 | 57.55 | 55.58 | 59.50 | 3.92 | 15.06 | 17.70 | 15.57 | 19.52 | 3.95 | 3.77 | 13.46 | 11.99 | 14.71 | 2.72 | 2.90 | (Uganda) |
| Ghana | 65.97 | 63.47 | 68.59 | 5.12 | 6.88 | 57.94 | 56.84 | 59.12 | 2.28 | 6.21 | 16.99 | 15.45 | 18.52 | 3.07 | 1.16 | 13.11 | 12.14 | 14.07 | 1.93 | 0.94 | (Ghana) |
| Micronesia | 65.94 | 63.28 | 68.81 | 5.53 | 2.38 | 58.15 | 56.69 | 59.74 | 3.05 | 1.87 | 16.04 | 15.04 | 16.98 | 1.94 | 0.83 | 12.13 | 11.61 | 12.63 | 1.02 | 0.46 | (Federated States of Micronesia) |
| South Africa | 65.84 | 62.50 | 68.85 | 6.35 | 8.72 | 56.29 | 54.65 | 57.73 | 3.08 | 6.89 | 18.71 | 16.78 | 19.92 | 3.14 | 1.70 | 13.77 | 12.67 | 14.46 | 1.79 | 1.02 | (South Africa) |
| Solomon Islands | 65.67 | 63.37 | 68.29 | 4.92 | 2.27 | 58.12 | 57.03 | 59.34 | 2.31 | 1.82 | 15.50 | 14.67 | 16.42 | 1.75 | 0.86 | 11.87 | 11.52 | 12.24 | 0.72 | 0.52 | (Solomon Islands) |
| Djibouti | 65.44 | 63.63 | 67.27 | 3.64 | 5.92 | 57.61 | 56.90 | 58.34 | 1.44 | 5.24 | 17.45 | 16.30 | 18.54 | 2.24 | 1.48 | 13.44 | 12.77 | 14.08 | 1.31 | 1.13 | (Djibouti) |
| Gabon | 64.97 | 62.61 | 67.75 | 5.14 | 7.28 | 56.38 | 55.38 | 57.56 | 2.18 | 6.34 | 16.24 | 14.72 | 17.96 | 3.24 | 1.73 | 12.21 | 11.20 | 13.34 | 2.14 | 1.24 | (Gabon) |
| Botswana | 64.92 | 62.74 | 66.95 | 4.21 | 17.76 | 56.05 | 55.04 | 56.96 | 1.92 | 14.74 | 17.93 | 16.14 | 19.42 | 3.28 | 3.85 | 13.38 | 12.20 | 14.36 | 2.16 | 2.73 | (Botswana) |
| Gambia | 64.91 | 62.91 | 66.98 | 4.07 | 5.76 | 56.60 | 56.31 | 56.93 | 0.62 | 5.09 | 16.45 | 15.48 | 17.44 | 1.96 | 0.39 | 12.53 | 12.19 | 12.87 | 0.68 | 0.28 | (The Gambia) |
| Burundi | 64.32 | 62.37 | 66.23 | 3.86 | 19.96 | 56.21 | 55.10 | 57.29 | 2.19 | 17.41 | 16.51 | 15.46 | 17.42 | 1.96 | 3.78 | 12.78 | 12.16 | 13.30 | 1.14 | 2.99 | (Burundi) |
| Benin | 64.14 | 61.76 | 66.58 | 4.82 | 6.72 | 55.87 | 54.94 | 56.83 | 1.89 | 5.98 | 17.78 | 16.47 | 18.98 | 2.51 | 1.55 | 13.46 | 12.77 | 14.11 | 1.34 | 1.18 | (Benin) |
| Madagascar | 63.82 | 62.83 | 64.82 | 1.99 | 5.09 | 56.16 | 56.09 | 56.23 | 0.14 | 4.83 | 16.25 | 15.90 | 16.57 | 0.67 | 1.29 | 12.56 | 12.48 | 12.64 | 0.16 | 1.08 | (Madagascar) |
| Eritrea | 63.76 | 61.00 | 66.53 | 5.53 | 8.83 | 55.67 | 53.75 | 57.59 | 3.84 | 7.98 | 15.09 | 13.87 | 16.18 | 2.31 | 1.87 | 11.49 | 10.65 | 12.23 | 1.58 | 1.37 | (Eritrea) |
| Haiti | 63.66 | 63.18 | 64.16 | 0.98 | 6.93 | 55.00 | 55.56 | 54.47 | −1.09 | 5.84 | 16.25 | 16.28 | 16.24 | −0.04 | 1.06 | 12.35 | 12.54 | 12.20 | −0.34 | 0.70 | (Haiti) |
| Togo | 63.65 | 61.21 | 66.34 | 5.13 | 7.57 | 55.81 | 54.83 | 56.91 | 2.08 | 6.79 | 16.38 | 15.00 | 17.84 | 2.84 | 1.11 | 12.64 | 11.84 | 13.48 | 1.64 | 0.93 | (Togo) |
| Namibia | 63.49 | 59.99 | 66.90 | 6.91 | 10.47 | 55.53 | 53.34 | 57.66 | 4.32 | 8.81 | 16.47 | 14.24 | 18.26 | 4.02 | 2.40 | 12.59 | 11.05 | 13.82 | 2.77 | 1.71 | (Namibia) |
| Cote d'Ivoire | 63.48 | 61.19 | 66.19 | 5.00 | 12.31 | 55.42 | 54.42 | 56.64 | 2.22 | 10.90 | 17.07 | 15.86 | 18.55 | 2.69 | 2.48 | 13.00 | 12.30 | 13.85 | 1.55 | 2.01 | (Ivory Coast) |
| Liberia | 63.44 | 62.68 | 64.20 | 1.52 | 10.17 | 53.99 | 54.54 | 53.47 | −1.07 | 8.88 | 17.05 | 16.96 | 17.11 | 0.15 | 1.60 | 12.57 | 12.83 | 12.36 | −0.47 | 1.15 | (Liberia) |
| Malawi | 63.23 | 60.43 | 66.05 | 5.62 | 18.59 | 55.54 | 54.20 | 56.91 | 2.71 | 16.53 | 15.90 | 14.19 | 17.44 | 3.25 | 2.82 | 12.24 | 11.21 | 13.17 | 1.96 | 2.25 | (Malawi) |
| Nigeria | 63.07 | 61.68 | 64.51 | 2.83 | 9.01 | 54.81 | 54.68 | 54.95 | 0.27 | 8.18 | 18.61 | 18.00 | 19.21 | 1.21 | 2.39 | 14.10 | 13.94 | 14.25 | 0.31 | 1.94 | (Nigeria) |
| Congo Republic | 62.76 | 62.43 | 63.08 | 0.65 | 10.54 | 54.67 | 55.30 | 54.06 | −1.24 | 9.14 | 15.56 | 15.31 | 15.79 | 0.48 | 2.48 | 11.80 | 11.79 | 11.82 | 0.03 | 1.84 | (Republic of the Congo) |
| Burkina Faso | 62.61 | 60.08 | 65.06 | 4.98 | 10.72 | 54.96 | 53.78 | 56.09 | 2.31 | 9.90 | 16.77 | 15.33 | 17.92 | 2.59 | 1.49 | 12.93 | 12.04 | 13.64 | 1.60 | 1.31 | (Burkina Faso) |
| Angola | 62.49 | 60.33 | 64.65 | 4.32 | 13.12 | 54.32 | 53.24 | 55.40 | 2.16 | 11.47 | 16.35 | 14.90 | 17.69 | 2.79 | 2.31 | 12.31 | 11.34 | 13.21 | 1.87 | 1.70 | (Angola) |
| Kiribati | 62.14 | 58.90 | 65.32 | 6.42 | 2.06 | 54.66 | 52.72 | 56.58 | 3.86 | 1.80 | 15.14 | 13.78 | 16.16 | 2.38 | 0.93 | 11.40 | 10.59 | 12.01 | 1.42 | 0.63 | (Kiribati) |
| Cameroon | 62.03 | 60.08 | 64.06 | 3.98 | 9.07 | 54.24 | 53.56 | 54.96 | 1.40 | 8.11 | 16.80 | 15.66 | 17.89 | 2.23 | 2.01 | 12.77 | 12.19 | 13.33 | 1.14 | 1.60 | (Cameroon) |
| Congo DR | 61.84 | 59.67 | 64.08 | 4.41 | 9.20 | 53.50 | 52.46 | 54.59 | 2.13 | 8.47 | 15.99 | 14.89 | 17.04 | 2.15 | 1.52 | 11.99 | 11.28 | 12.67 | 1.39 | 1.25 | (Democratic Republic of the Congo) |
| Mali | 61.83 | 61.28 | 62.41 | 1.13 | 8.77 | 53.81 | 54.23 | 53.40 | −0.83 | 7.75 | 17.18 | 17.15 | 17.20 | 0.05 | 1.34 | 13.00 | 13.22 | 12.82 | −0.40 | 1.01 | (Mali) |
| Zambia | 61.76 | 59.43 | 63.95 | 4.52 | 17.23 | 53.87 | 52.67 | 54.97 | 2.30 | 14.98 | 16.00 | 14.43 | 17.22 | 2.79 | 3.30 | 12.20 | 11.17 | 13.00 | 1.83 | 2.48 | (Zambia) |
| Equatorial Guinea | 61.39 | 59.88 | 63.05 | 3.17 | 7.36 | 53.17 | 52.76 | 53.51 | 0.75 | 6.57 | 16.92 | 15.62 | 18.23 | 2.61 | 1.95 | 12.58 | 11.78 | 13.37 | 1.59 | 1.44 | (Equatorial Guinea) |
| Afghanistan | 61.22 | 60.04 | 62.55 | 2.51 | 7.40 | 52.31 | 51.87 | 52.84 | 0.97 | 6.28 | 15.16 | 15.41 | 14.99 | −0.42 | 2.02 | 11.03 | 11.31 | 10.84 | −0.47 | 1.17 | (Afghanistan) |
| Guinea | 61.13 | 59.80 | 62.36 | 2.56 | 6.93 | 53.51 | 53.36 | 53.67 | 0.31 | 6.08 | 16.58 | 16.02 | 17.01 | 0.99 | 1.09 | 12.71 | 12.57 | 12.81 | 0.24 | 0.84 | (Guinea) |
| Niger | 60.57 | 59.64 | 61.52 | 1.88 | 10.33 | 53.15 | 53.31 | 52.99 | −0.32 | 9.29 | 17.24 | 16.85 | 17.58 | 0.73 | 1.43 | 13.21 | 13.23 | 13.21 | −0.02 | 1.15 | (Niger) |
| Sierra Leone | 60.40 | 59.50 | 61.30 | 1.80 | 10.61 | 52.63 | 52.68 | 52.58 | −0.10 | 9.56 | 16.62 | 16.32 | 16.87 | 0.55 | 1.45 | 12.62 | 12.64 | 12.61 | −0.03 | 1.15 | (Sierra Leone) |
| Chad | 59.37 | 57.84 | 60.94 | 3.10 | 8.20 | 51.78 | 51.37 | 52.20 | 0.83 | 7.22 | 16.05 | 15.34 | 16.71 | 1.37 | 1.41 | 12.18 | 11.90 | 12.44 | 0.54 | 1.11 | (Chad) |
| Zimbabwe | 59.07 | 56.90 | 61.02 | 4.12 | 13.32 | 51.95 | 50.90 | 52.93 | 2.03 | 11.42 | 14.31 | 13.12 | 15.27 | 2.15 | 0.71 | 10.98 | 10.21 | 11.58 | 1.37 | 0.48 | (Zimbabwe) |
| South Sudan | 59.00 | 56.78 | 61.16 | 4.38 | 7.10 | 50.96 | 49.90 | 52.00 | 2.10 | 6.35 | 15.60 | 14.35 | 16.65 | 2.30 | 0.37 | 11.47 | 10.85 | 11.99 | 1.14 | 0.30 | (South Sudan) |
| Guinea-Bissau | 58.98 | 56.41 | 61.44 | 5.03 | 8.78 | 51.81 | 50.60 | 52.96 | 2.36 | 7.86 | 14.57 | 13.43 | 15.47 | 2.04 | 1.60 | 11.17 | 10.55 | 11.65 | 1.10 | 1.23 | (Guinea-Bissau) |
| Mozambique | 58.51 | 55.39 | 61.67 | 6.28 | 7.56 | 50.65 | 49.27 | 52.06 | 2.79 | 7.10 | 15.15 | 12.92 | 17.06 | 4.14 | 0.47 | 11.41 | 9.96 | 12.64 | 2.68 | 0.59 | (Mozambique) |
| Eswatini | 55.75 | 52.47 | 59.38 | 6.91 | 8.97 | 48.65 | 46.64 | 50.88 | 4.24 | 7.23 | 14.22 | 11.96 | 16.13 | 4.17 | 1.59 | 10.69 | 9.11 | 12.02 | 2.91 | 0.94 | (Eswatini) |
| Somalia | 55.21 | 52.87 | 57.75 | 4.88 | 5.93 | 48.65 | 47.28 | 50.14 | 2.86 | 5.24 | 13.52 | 12.42 | 14.59 | 2.17 | 1.17 | 10.41 | 9.72 | 11.08 | 1.36 | 0.88 | (Somalia) |
| Central African Republic | 52.93 | 50.31 | 55.89 | 5.58 | 8.70 | 45.97 | 44.41 | 47.75 | 3.34 | 7.67 | 12.61 | 11.19 | 14.27 | 3.08 | 1.48 | 9.42 | 8.44 | 10.56 | 2.12 | 1.15 | (Central African Republic) |
| Lesotho | 51.78 | 48.96 | 54.91 | 5.95 | 4.40 | 45.04 | 43.39 | 46.88 | 3.49 | 3.22 | 12.71 | 10.80 | 14.33 | 3.53 | −0.41 | 9.52 | 8.24 | 10.59 | 2.35 | −0.61 | (Lesotho) |

== CIA World Factbook (2024) ==
The US CIA published the following life expectancy data in its World Factbook.

CIA World Factbook (2024). All, male, female, and sex gap.
| Country | All | M | F | Sex gap |
|---|---|---|---|---|
| Monaco | 89.8 | 86.0 | 93.7 | 7.7 |
| Singapore | 86.7 | 84.0 | 89.5 | 5.5 |
| Macau | 85.3 | 82.5 | 88.3 | 5.8 |
| Japan | 85.2 | 82.3 | 88.2 | 5.9 |
| Canada | 84.2 | 81.9 | 86.6 | 4.7 |
| San Marino | 84.2 | 81.7 | 87.0 | 5.3 |
| Hong Kong | 84.0 | 81.3 | 86.8 | 5.5 |
| Iceland | 84.0 | 81.8 | 86.3 | 4.5 |
| Switzerland | 83.9 | 82.0 | 85.8 | 3.8 |
| Andorra | 83.8 | 81.6 | 86.2 | 4.6 |
| Guernsey | 83.6 | 80.9 | 86.4 | 5.5 |
| Malta | 83.6 | 81.5 | 85.8 | 4.3 |
| Australia | 83.5 | 81.3 | 85.7 | 4.4 |
| Korea, South | 83.4 | 80.3 | 86.6 | 6.3 |
| Luxembourg | 83.4 | 80.9 | 85.9 | 5.0 |
| Israel | 83.1 | 81.1 | 85.1 | 4.0 |
| Italy | 83.0 | 80.7 | 85.5 | 4.8 |
| Jersey | 83.0 | 80.6 | 85.7 | 5.1 |
| Liechtenstein | 83.0 | 80.7 | 85.8 | 5.1 |
| Spain | 83.0 | 80.3 | 85.8 | 5.5 |
| New Zealand | 82.9 | 81.2 | 84.8 | 3.6 |
| Norway | 82.9 | 81.3 | 84.6 | 3.3 |
| Sweden | 82.9 | 81.2 | 84.7 | 3.5 |
| Austria | 82.7 | 80.1 | 85.4 | 5.3 |
| Anguilla | 82.6 | 80.0 | 85.3 | 5.3 |
| France | 82.6 | 79.8 | 85.5 | 5.7 |
| Bermuda | 82.5 | 79.4 | 85.7 | 6.3 |
| Cayman Islands | 82.5 | 79.8 | 85.2 | 5.4 |
| Isle of Man | 82.5 | 80.7 | 84.4 | 3.7 |
| Belgium | 82.3 | 79.7 | 85.0 | 5.3 |
| Finland | 82.2 | 79.3 | 85.2 | 5.9 |
| Slovenia | 82.2 | 79.4 | 85.2 | 5.8 |
| United Kingdom | 82.2 | 80.1 | 84.4 | 4.3 |
| Denmark | 82.1 | 80.2 | 84.1 | 3.9 |
| Puerto Rico | 82.1 | 78.9 | 85.5 | 6.6 |
| Ireland | 82.0 | 80.3 | 83.9 | 3.6 |
| Germany | 81.9 | 79.6 | 84.4 | 4.8 |
| Greece | 81.9 | 79.4 | 84.6 | 5.2 |
| Netherlands | 81.9 | 80.3 | 83.5 | 3.2 |
| Portugal | 81.9 | 78.8 | 85.2 | 6.4 |
| Saint Pierre and Miquelon | 81.8 | 79.5 | 84.3 | 4.8 |
| Faroe Islands | 81.7 | 79.2 | 84.4 | 5.2 |
| Taiwan | 81.6 | 78.6 | 84.7 | 6.1 |
| Turks and Caicos Islands | 81.3 | 78.5 | 84.1 | 5.6 |
| Wallis and Futuna | 81.1 | 78.2 | 84.2 | 6.0 |
| Saint Barthelemy | 81.0 | 78.0 | 84.2 | 6.2 |
| Saint Martin | 81.0 | 78.0 | 84.2 | 6.2 |
| Gibraltar | 80.9 | 78.1 | 83.8 | 5.7 |
| Saint Helena, Ascension, and Tristan da Cunha | 80.9 | 78.1 | 83.9 | 5.8 |
| United States | 80.9 | 78.7 | 83.1 | 4.4 |
| Virgin Islands, U.S. | 80.7 | 77.6 | 84.1 | 6.5 |
| Bahrain | 80.4 | 78.1 | 82.7 | 4.6 |
| Chile | 80.3 | 77.3 | 83.3 | 6.0 |
| Costa Rica | 80.3 | 77.7 | 82.9 | 5.2 |
| Qatar | 80.3 | 78.2 | 82.4 | 4.2 |
| Cyprus | 80.2 | 77.4 | 83.1 | 5.7 |
| Cuba | 80.1 | 77.8 | 82.6 | 4.8 |
| Virgin Islands, British | 80.1 | 78.6 | 81.7 | 3.1 |
| Albania | 79.9 | 77.3 | 82.8 | 5.5 |
| Curaçao | 79.9 | 77.6 | 82.3 | 4.7 |
| United Arab Emirates | 79.9 | 78.6 | 81.4 | 2.8 |
| Sint Maarten | 79.7 | 77.4 | 82.2 | 4.8 |
| Kuwait | 79.6 | 78.1 | 81.1 | 3.0 |
| Saint Lucia | 79.4 | 76.7 | 82.3 | 5.6 |
| New Caledonia | 79.3 | 75.4 | 83.3 | 7.9 |
| Lebanon | 79.2 | 77.8 | 80.7 | 2.9 |
| Panama | 79.2 | 76.4 | 82.2 | 5.8 |
| Barbados | 79.0 | 76.3 | 81.8 | 5.5 |
| Brunei | 78.9 | 76.5 | 81.3 | 4.8 |
| French Polynesia | 78.9 | 76.6 | 81.3 | 4.7 |
| Uruguay | 78.9 | 75.8 | 82.1 | 6.3 |
| Argentina | 78.8 | 75.8 | 82.0 | 6.2 |
| Paraguay | 78.8 | 76.2 | 81.6 | 5.4 |
| China | 78.7 | 76.0 | 81.7 | 5.7 |
| Dominica | 78.7 | 75.8 | 81.8 | 6.0 |
| Czech Republic | 78.6 | 75.6 | 81.8 | 6.2 |
| Aruba | 78.5 | 75.4 | 81.6 | 6.2 |
| Bosnia and Herzegovina | 78.5 | 75.5 | 81.6 | 6.1 |
| Estonia | 78.4 | 73.8 | 83.2 | 9.4 |
| Antigua and Barbuda | 78.3 | 76.1 | 80.5 | 4.4 |
| Montenegro | 78.2 | 75.8 | 80.7 | 4.9 |
| Thailand | 78.2 | 75.2 | 81.3 | 6.1 |
| Guam | 78.0 | 75.6 | 80.5 | 4.9 |
| Tonga | 78.0 | 76.4 | 79.7 | 3.3 |
| Algeria | 77.9 | 77.2 | 78.7 | 1.5 |
| Croatia | 77.7 | 74.6 | 81.0 | 6.4 |
| Libya | 77.7 | 75.5 | 80.0 | 4.5 |
| Cook Islands | 77.6 | 74.8 | 80.6 | 5.8 |
| Saint Kitts and Nevis | 77.6 | 75.2 | 80.1 | 4.9 |
| Maldives | 77.4 | 75.1 | 79.9 | 4.8 |
| Oman | 77.4 | 75.5 | 79.4 | 3.9 |
| North Macedonia | 77.3 | 75.3 | 79.6 | 4.3 |
| Tunisia | 77.3 | 75.7 | 79.1 | 3.4 |
| Saint Vincent and the Grenadines | 77.2 | 75.2 | 79.3 | 4.1 |
| Saudi Arabia | 77.2 | 75.6 | 78.8 | 3.2 |
| Slovakia | 77.2 | 73.7 | 81.0 | 7.3 |
| Solomon Islands | 77.2 | 74.6 | 80.0 | 5.4 |
| Northern Mariana Islands | 77.1 | 75.0 | 79.5 | 4.5 |
| Romania | 76.9 | 73.4 | 80.5 | 7.1 |
| Sri Lanka | 76.8 | 73.7 | 79.9 | 6.2 |
| Armenia | 76.7 | 73.4 | 80.1 | 6.7 |
| Bahamas, The | 76.7 | 75.1 | 78.4 | 3.3 |
| Poland | 76.7 | 72.8 | 80.9 | 8.1 |
| Turkey | 76.7 | 74.4 | 79.2 | 4.8 |
| Malaysia | 76.6 | 75.0 | 78.4 | 3.4 |
| Seychelles | 76.6 | 72.2 | 81.1 | 8.9 |
| Jordan | 76.5 | 75.0 | 78.1 | 3.1 |
| Trinidad and Tobago | 76.5 | 74.6 | 78.4 | 3.8 |
| West Bank | 76.5 | 74.4 | 78.8 | 4.4 |
| Latvia | 76.4 | 72.0 | 81.0 | 9.0 |
| Brazil | 76.3 | 72.6 | 80.1 | 7.5 |
| Grenada | 76.3 | 73.7 | 79.1 | 5.4 |
| Jamaica | 76.3 | 74.5 | 78.1 | 3.6 |
| Uzbekistan | 76.2 | 73.6 | 79.0 | 5.4 |
| Bulgaria | 76.1 | 72.9 | 79.4 | 6.5 |
| Lithuania | 76.1 | 70.8 | 81.7 | 10.9 |
| Montserrat | 76.1 | 76.9 | 75.3 | -1.6 |
| Vietnam | 76.1 | 73.5 | 78.9 | 5.4 |
| Hungary | 76.0 | 72.9 | 79.3 | 6.4 |
| Azerbaijan | 75.9 | 73.5 | 78.6 | 5.1 |
| El Salvador | 75.9 | 72.4 | 79.5 | 7.1 |
| American Samoa | 75.8 | 73.4 | 78.5 | 5.1 |
| Samoa | 75.7 | 72.8 | 78.7 | 5.9 |
| Vanuatu | 75.7 | 74.0 | 77.4 | 3.4 |
| Iran | 75.6 | 74.3 | 77.1 | 2.8 |
| Gaza Strip | 75.5 | 73.7 | 77.4 | 3.7 |
| Mauritius | 75.4 | 72.6 | 78.4 | 5.8 |
| Serbia | 75.3 | 72.7 | 78.1 | 5.4 |
| Bangladesh | 75.2 | 73.1 | 77.5 | 4.4 |
| Marshall Islands | 75.2 | 73.0 | 77.5 | 4.5 |
| Palau | 75.2 | 72.0 | 78.5 | 6.5 |
| Egypt | 75.0 | 73.8 | 76.2 | 2.4 |
| Micronesia, Federated States of | 75.0 | 72.9 | 77.2 | 4.3 |
| Colombia | 74.9 | 71.3 | 78.7 | 7.4 |
| Ecuador | 74.9 | 69.7 | 80.4 | 10.7 |
| Fiji | 74.8 | 72.2 | 77.6 | 5.4 |
| Syria | 74.8 | 73.4 | 76.4 | 3.0 |
| Belarus | 74.7 | 69.8 | 80.0 | 10.2 |
| Nicaragua | 74.7 | 73.2 | 76.4 | 3.2 |
| Mexico | 74.6 | 71.6 | 77.7 | 6.1 |
| Greenland | 74.5 | 71.8 | 77.3 | 5.5 |
| Venezuela | 74.5 | 71.5 | 77.7 | 6.2 |
| Belize | 74.3 | 72.6 | 76.1 | 3.5 |
| Cabo Verde | 74.3 | 72.0 | 76.7 | 4.7 |
| Morocco | 74.2 | 72.5 | 76.0 | 3.5 |
| Bhutan | 73.7 | 72.5 | 75.0 | 2.5 |
| Iraq | 73.7 | 71.9 | 75.7 | 3.8 |
| Indonesia | 73.6 | 71.3 | 76.0 | 4.7 |
| Guatemala | 73.5 | 71.5 | 75.6 | 4.1 |
| Korea, North | 73.5 | 70.2 | 77.0 | 6.8 |
| Kazakhstan | 73.3 | 69.0 | 77.9 | 8.9 |
| Honduras | 73.1 | 69.6 | 76.8 | 7.2 |
| Kosovo | 73.1 | 71.0 | 75.5 | 4.5 |
| Malawi | 73.0 | 69.9 | 76.1 | 6.2 |
| Nepal | 73.0 | 72.2 | 73.7 | 1.5 |
| Congo (Brazzaville) | 72.9 | 71.5 | 74.3 | 2.8 |
| Kyrgyzstan | 72.9 | 68.9 | 77.2 | 8.3 |
| Georgia | 72.8 | 68.7 | 77.2 | 8.5 |
| Suriname | 72.7 | 69.0 | 76.7 | 7.7 |
| Dominican Republic | 72.6 | 71.0 | 74.3 | 3.3 |
| Bolivia | 72.5 | 71.0 | 74.0 | 3.0 |
| Guyana | 72.4 | 70.6 | 74.3 | 3.7 |
| Turkmenistan | 72.4 | 69.4 | 75.5 | 6.1 |
| Russia | 72.3 | 67.4 | 77.4 | 10.0 |
| Togo | 72.1 | 69.5 | 74.7 | 5.2 |
| Mongolia | 71.9 | 67.8 | 76.3 | 8.5 |
| South Africa | 71.9 | 70.3 | 73.5 | 3.2 |
| Tajikistan | 71.9 | 70.1 | 73.8 | 3.7 |
| Cambodia | 71.4 | 69.6 | 73.3 | 3.7 |
| Philippines | 70.8 | 67.3 | 74.5 | 7.2 |
| Tanzania | 70.8 | 69.0 | 72.6 | 3.6 |
| Senegal | 70.6 | 68.8 | 72.4 | 3.6 |
| Timor-Leste | 70.5 | 68.9 | 72.3 | 3.4 |
| Ukraine | 70.5 | 65.4 | 75.8 | 10.4 |
| Gabon | 70.4 | 68.6 | 72.1 | 3.5 |
| Kenya | 70.4 | 68.6 | 72.2 | 3.6 |
| Burma | 70.3 | 68.5 | 72.1 | 3.6 |
| Pakistan | 70.3 | 68.2 | 72.5 | 4.3 |
| Ghana | 70.1 | 68.4 | 71.8 | 3.4 |
| Moldova | 70.1 | 66.1 | 74.4 | 8.3 |
| Papua New Guinea | 70.1 | 68.3 | 71.9 | 3.6 |
| Uganda | 69.7 | 67.5 | 72.0 | 4.5 |
| Laos | 69.0 | 67.4 | 70.7 | 3.3 |
| Tuvalu | 69.0 | 66.5 | 71.6 | 5.1 |
| Peru | 68.9 | 65.4 | 72.7 | 7.3 |
| Madagascar | 68.8 | 67.3 | 70.3 | 3.0 |
| Nauru | 68.6 | 65.0 | 72.3 | 7.3 |
| Kiribati | 68.5 | 65.9 | 71.3 | 5.4 |
| Gambia, The | 68.4 | 66.7 | 70.1 | 3.4 |
| India | 68.2 | 66.5 | 70.1 | 3.6 |
| Yemen | 68.2 | 65.8 | 70.6 | 4.8 |
| Burundi | 68.1 | 66.0 | 70.3 | 4.3 |
| Comoros | 67.8 | 65.5 | 70.2 | 4.7 |
| Sudan | 67.8 | 65.5 | 70.2 | 4.7 |
| Ethiopia | 67.7 | 65.4 | 70.0 | 4.6 |
| Sao Tome and Principe | 67.7 | 66.0 | 69.4 | 3.4 |
| Eritrea | 67.5 | 64.9 | 70.2 | 5.3 |
| Zimbabwe | 67.2 | 65.6 | 68.8 | 3.2 |
| Zambia | 66.9 | 65.2 | 68.7 | 3.5 |
| Rwanda | 66.6 | 64.6 | 68.6 | 4.0 |
| Botswana | 66.4 | 64.4 | 68.6 | 4.2 |
| Djibouti | 65.9 | 63.4 | 68.5 | 5.1 |
| Mauritania | 65.9 | 63.4 | 68.5 | 5.1 |
| Namibia | 65.9 | 64.2 | 67.6 | 3.4 |
| Haiti | 65.6 | 63.8 | 67.4 | 3.6 |
| Guinea | 64.6 | 62.7 | 66.6 | 3.9 |
| Guinea-Bissau | 64.5 | 62.2 | 66.8 | 4.6 |
| Burkina Faso | 64.2 | 62.3 | 66.1 | 3.8 |
| Cameroon | 64.2 | 62.3 | 66.1 | 3.8 |
| Equatorial Guinea | 63.9 | 61.6 | 66.2 | 4.6 |
| Côte d’Ivoire | 63.2 | 60.9 | 65.4 | 4.5 |
| Mali | 63.2 | 60.9 | 65.6 | 4.7 |
| Benin | 63.0 | 61.1 | 65.0 | 3.9 |
| Angola | 62.9 | 60.8 | 65.1 | 4.3 |
| Congo (Kinshasa) | 62.6 | 60.7 | 64.6 | 3.9 |
| Nigeria | 62.2 | 60.4 | 64.2 | 3.8 |
| Liberia | 61.6 | 59.9 | 63.3 | 3.4 |
| Niger | 60.9 | 59.3 | 62.5 | 3.2 |
| Eswatini | 60.7 | 58.7 | 62.8 | 4.1 |
| South Sudan | 60.3 | 58.4 | 62.2 | 3.8 |
| Lesotho | 60.2 | 58.1 | 62.3 | 4.2 |
| Chad | 60.0 | 58.1 | 62.0 | 3.9 |
| Sierra Leone | 59.4 | 57.8 | 61.0 | 3.2 |
| Mozambique | 58.3 | 57.1 | 59.6 | 2.5 |
| Somalia | 56.5 | 54.1 | 59.0 | 4.9 |
| Central African Republic | 56.4 | 55.1 | 57.7 | 2.6 |
| Afghanistan | 54.4 | 52.8 | 56.1 | 3.3 |
| World (2020) | 70.50 | 68.40 | 72.60 | 4.20 |
| European Union (2021) | 77.63 | 72.98 | 82.51 | 9.53 |

== Gallery ==
A comparison of average female and male life expectancy as defined by WHO, 2019. Open the original chart in a separate tab and hover over a bubble to highlight it. The squares of bubbles are proportional to country population according to estimation of the UN for 2019.

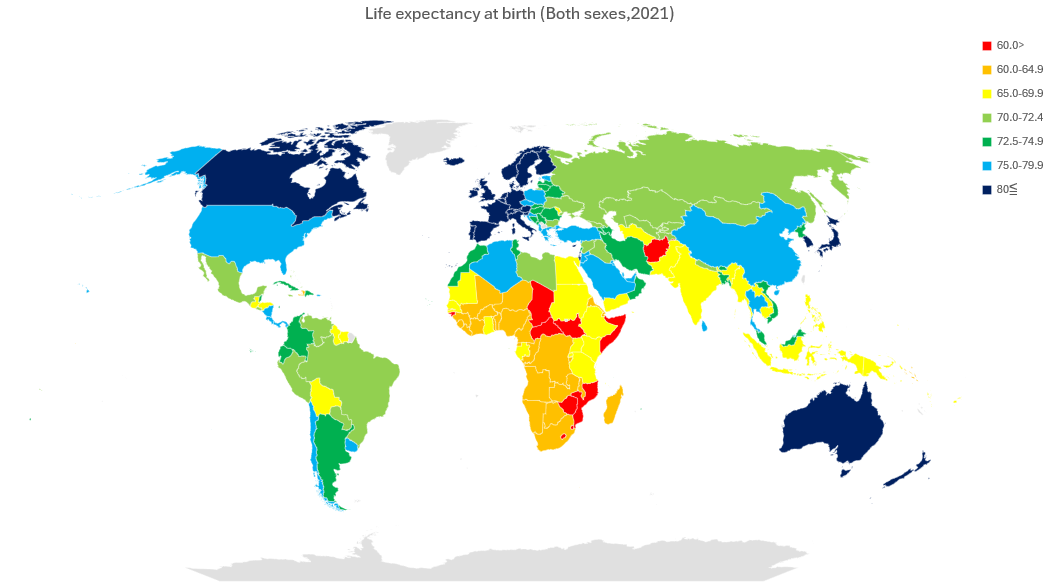
2021 life expectancy estimates by WHO: ≥ 80.0 75.0 – 79.9 / 70.0 – 74.9 65.0 – 69.9 / 60.0 – 64.9 55.0 – 59.9 / < 55.0 no data

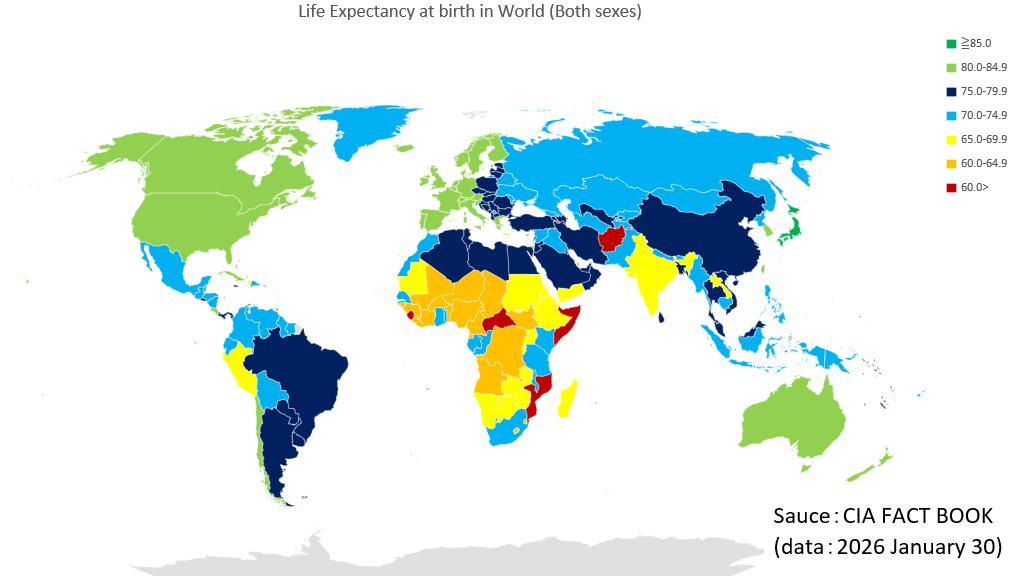
2020 life expectancy estimates by the CIA World Factbook: ≥ 85.0 80.0 – 84.9 / 75.0 – 79.9 70.0 – 74.9 / 65.0 – 69.9 60.0 – 64.9 / < 60.0 no data

2023 life expectancy estimates by the Population Reference Bureau

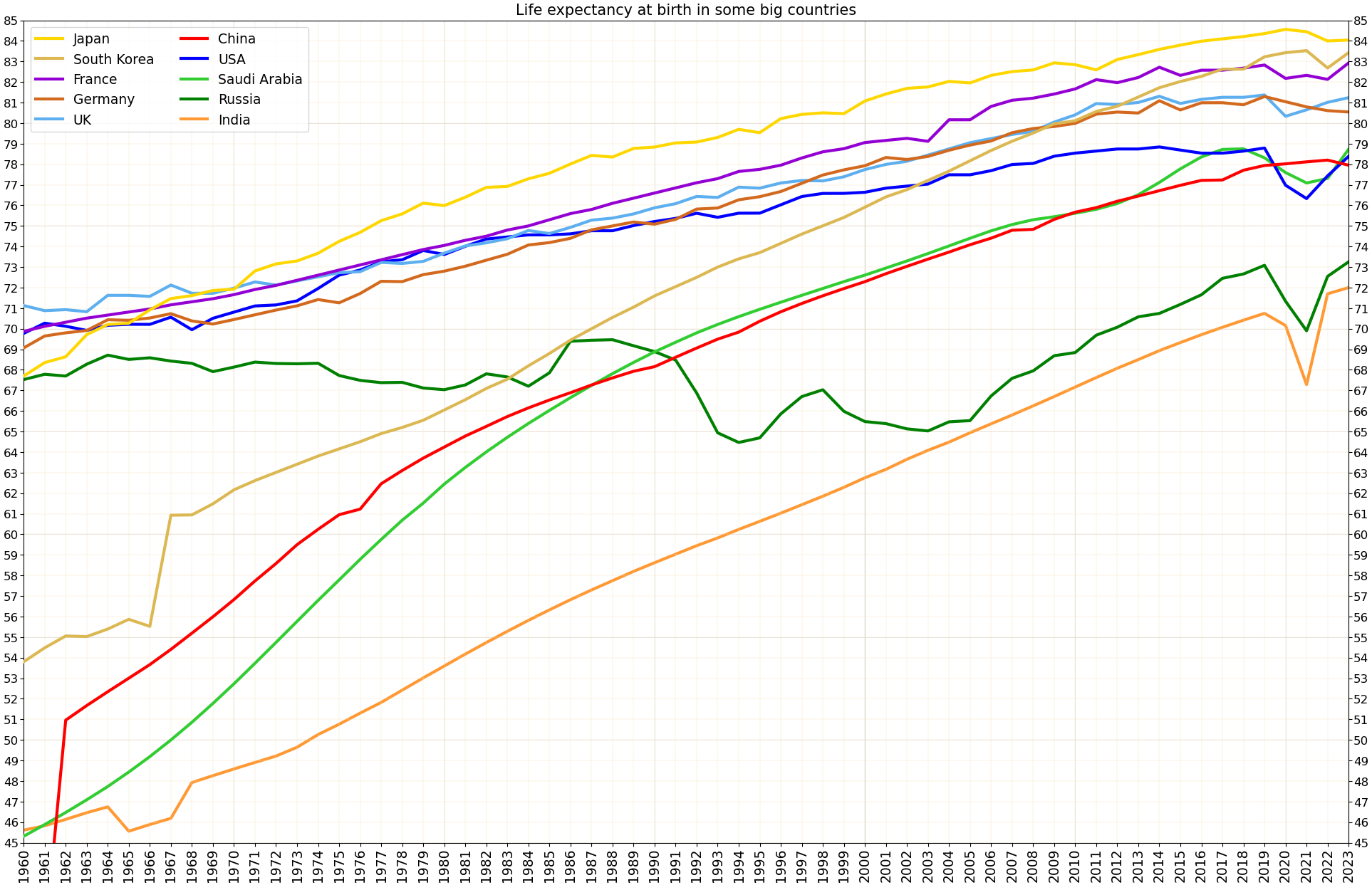
Life expectancy in some big countries, 2022

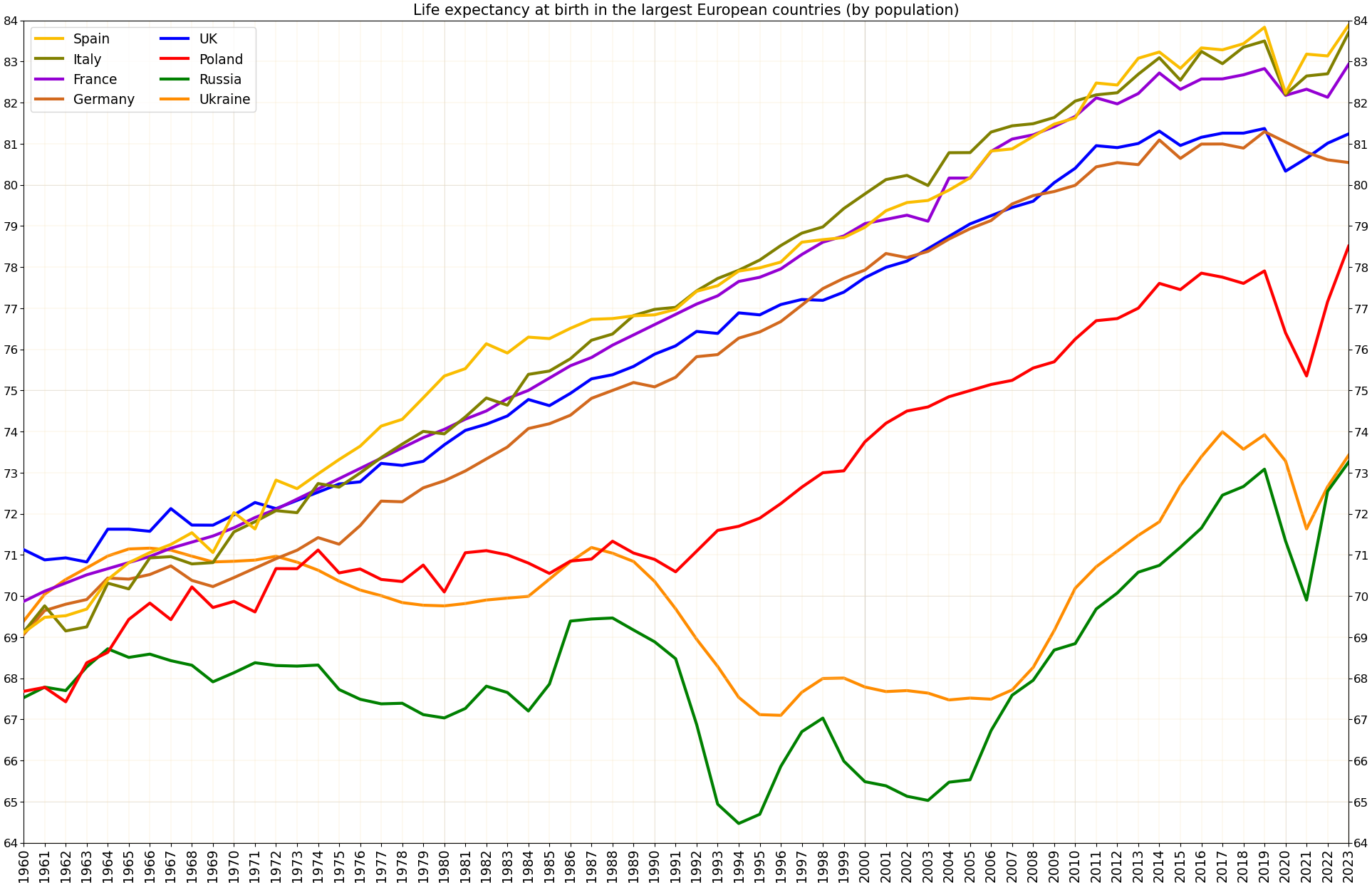
Life expectancy in some European countries, 2022

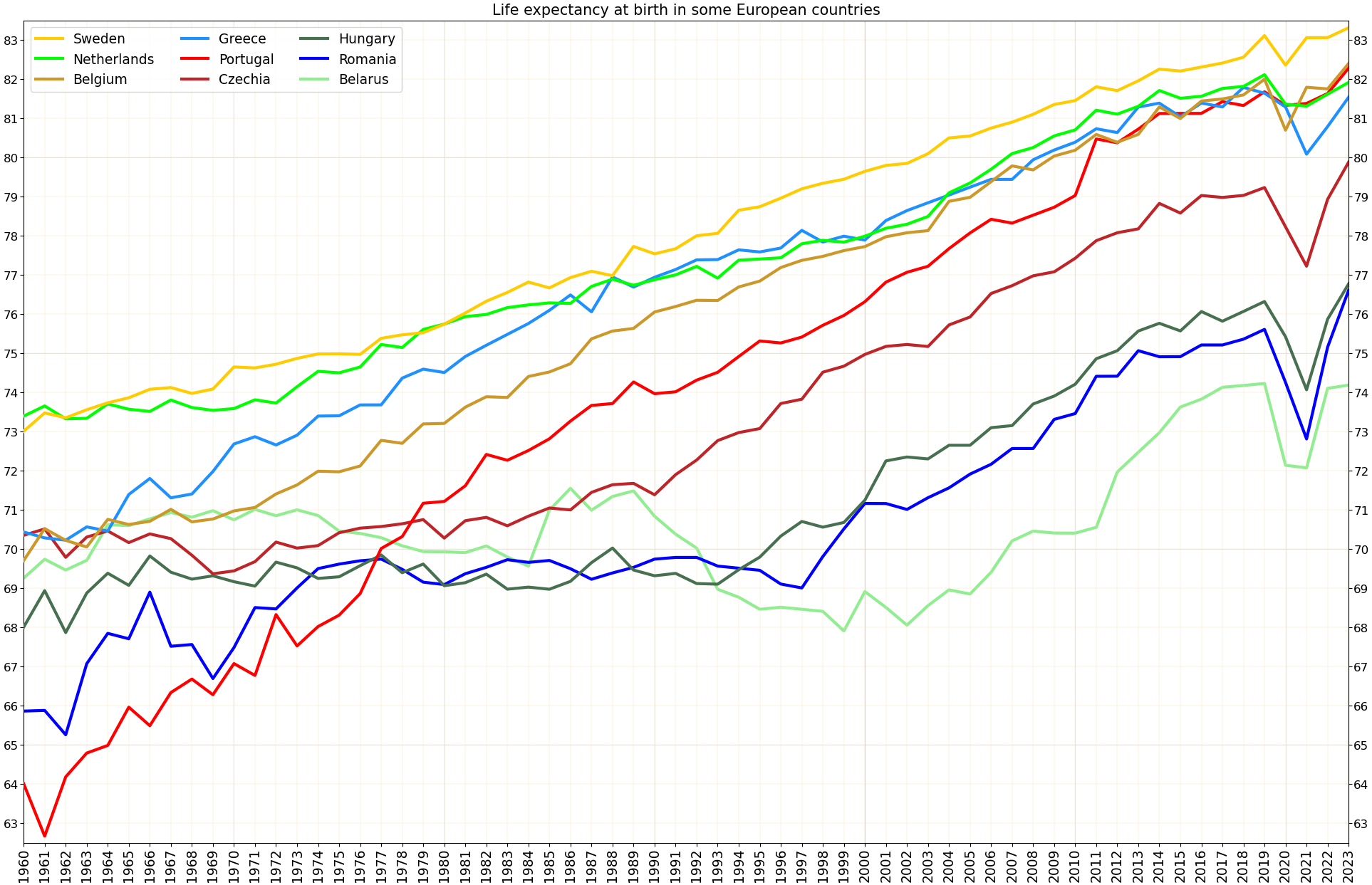
Life expectancy in some European countries, 2022

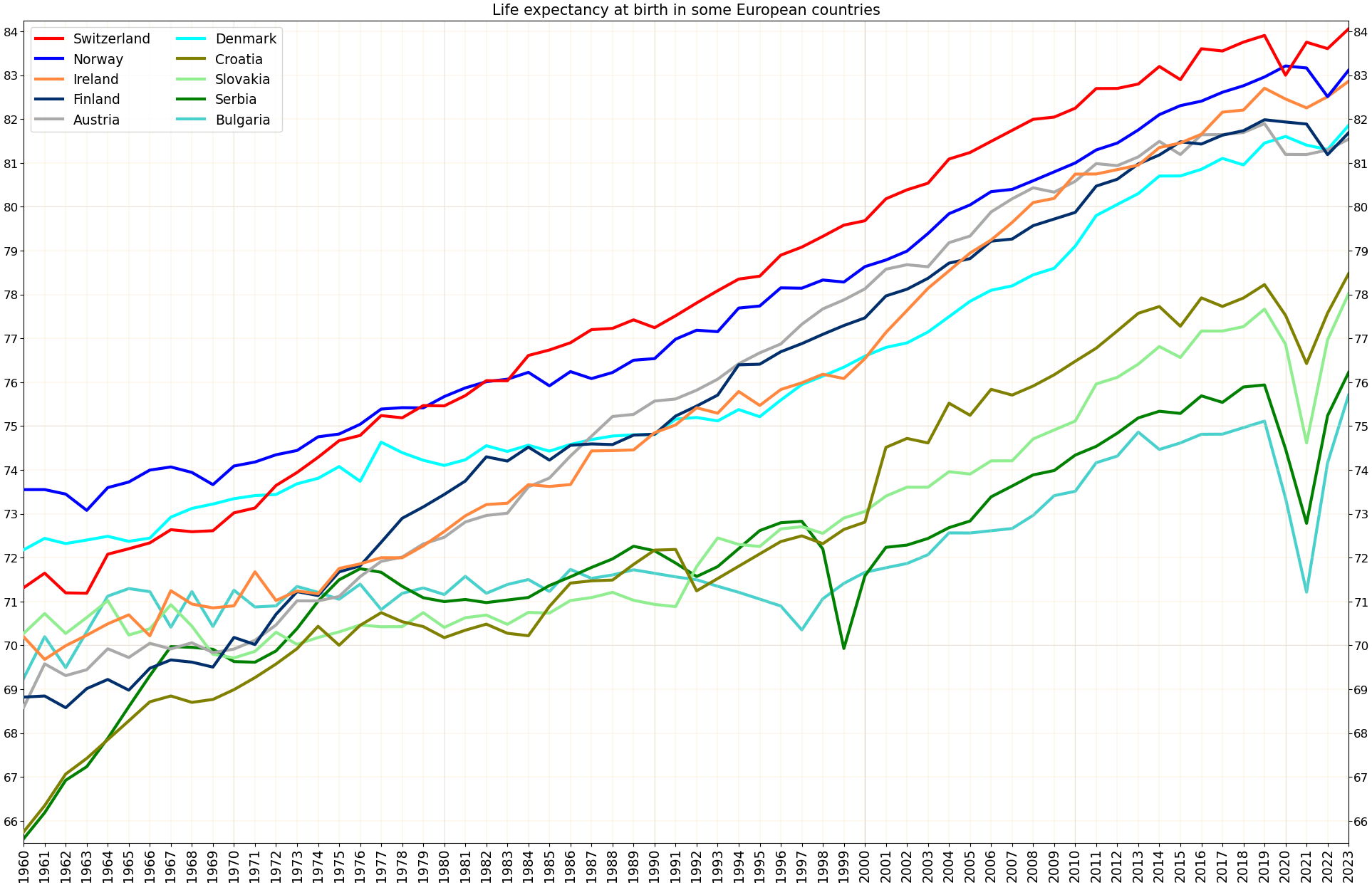
Life expectancy in some European countries (continued), 2022

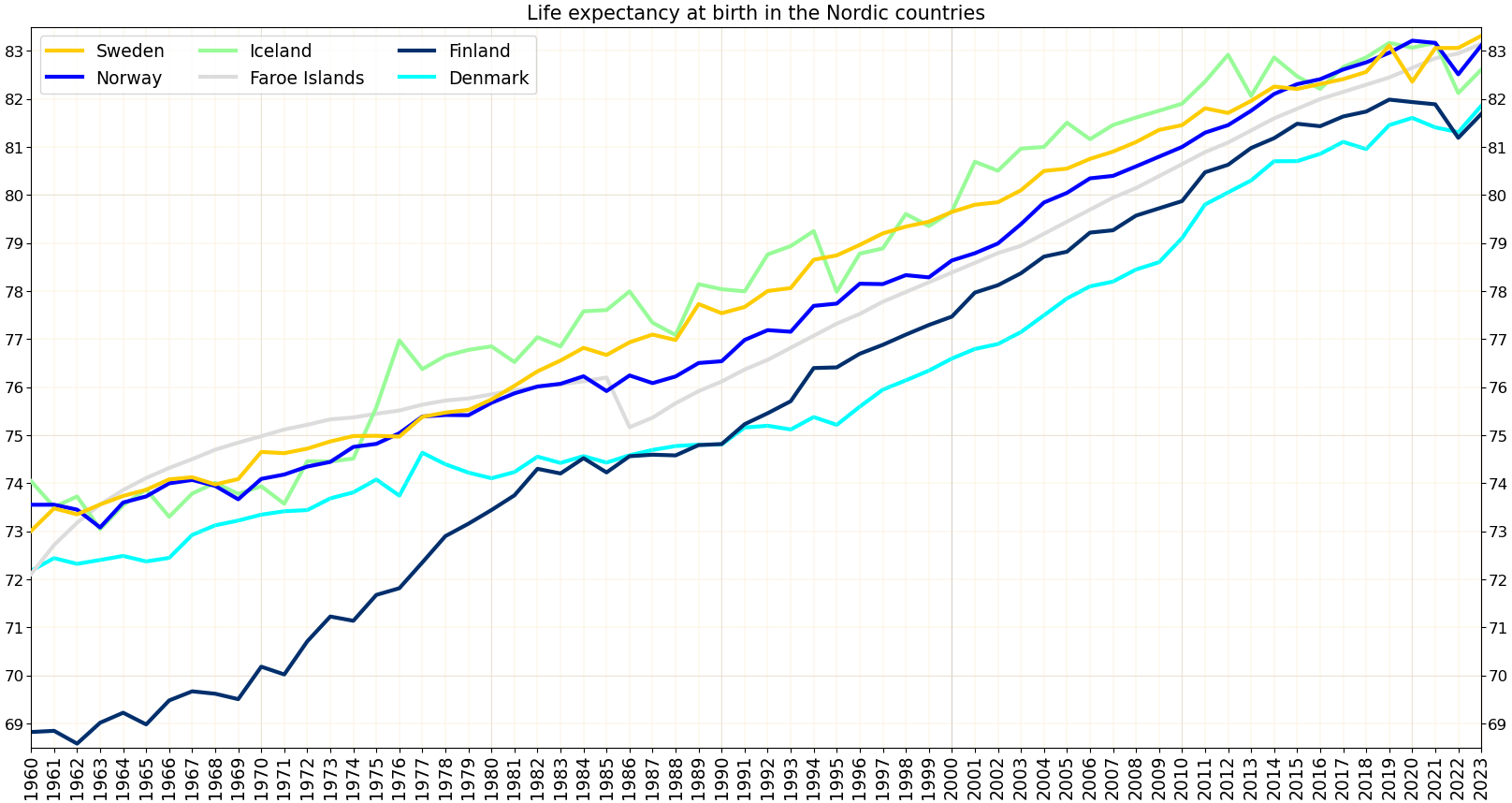
Life expectancy in the Nordic countries, 2022

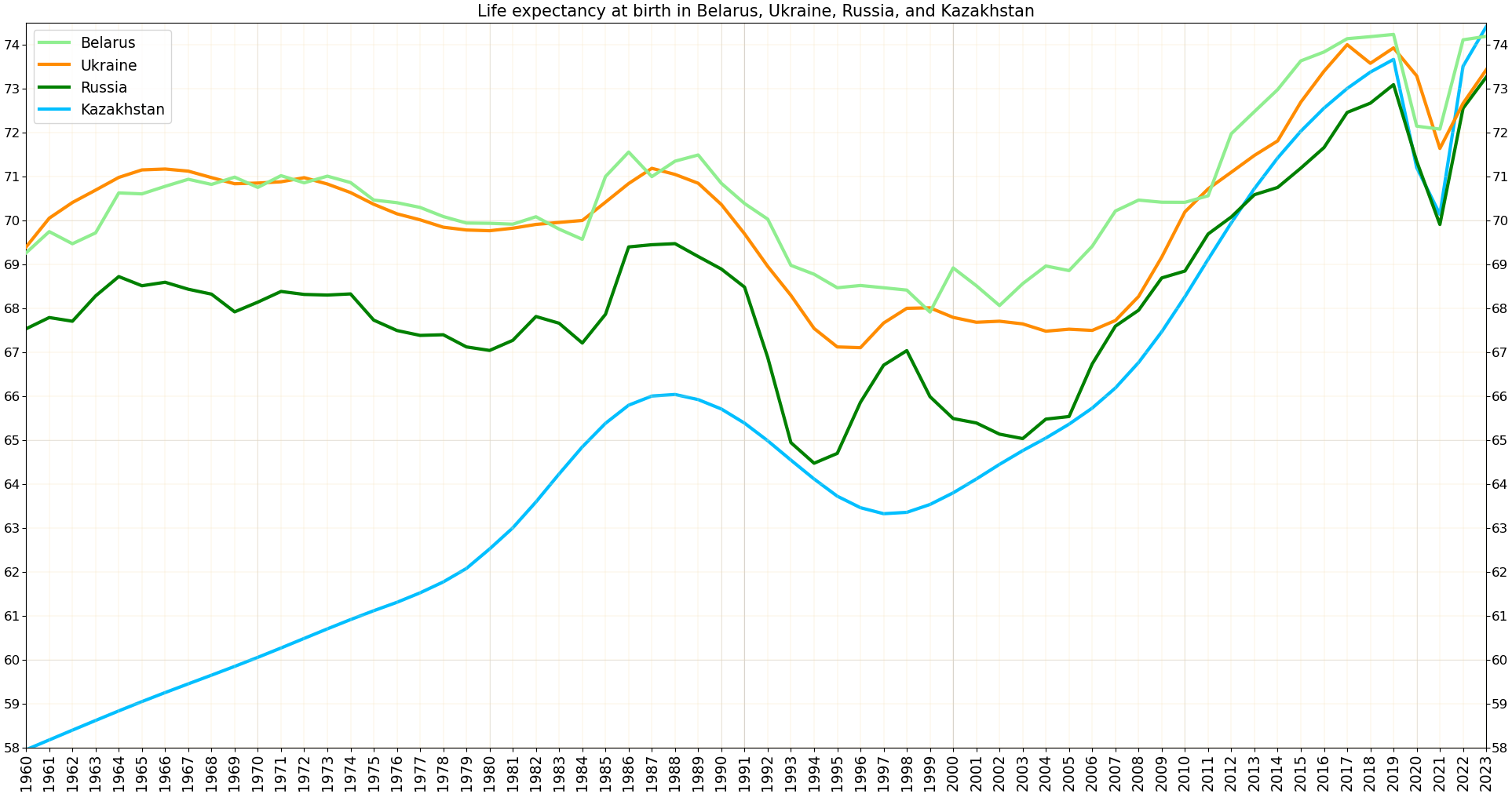
Life expectancy in Ukraine, Belarus, Russia and Kazakhstan, 2022

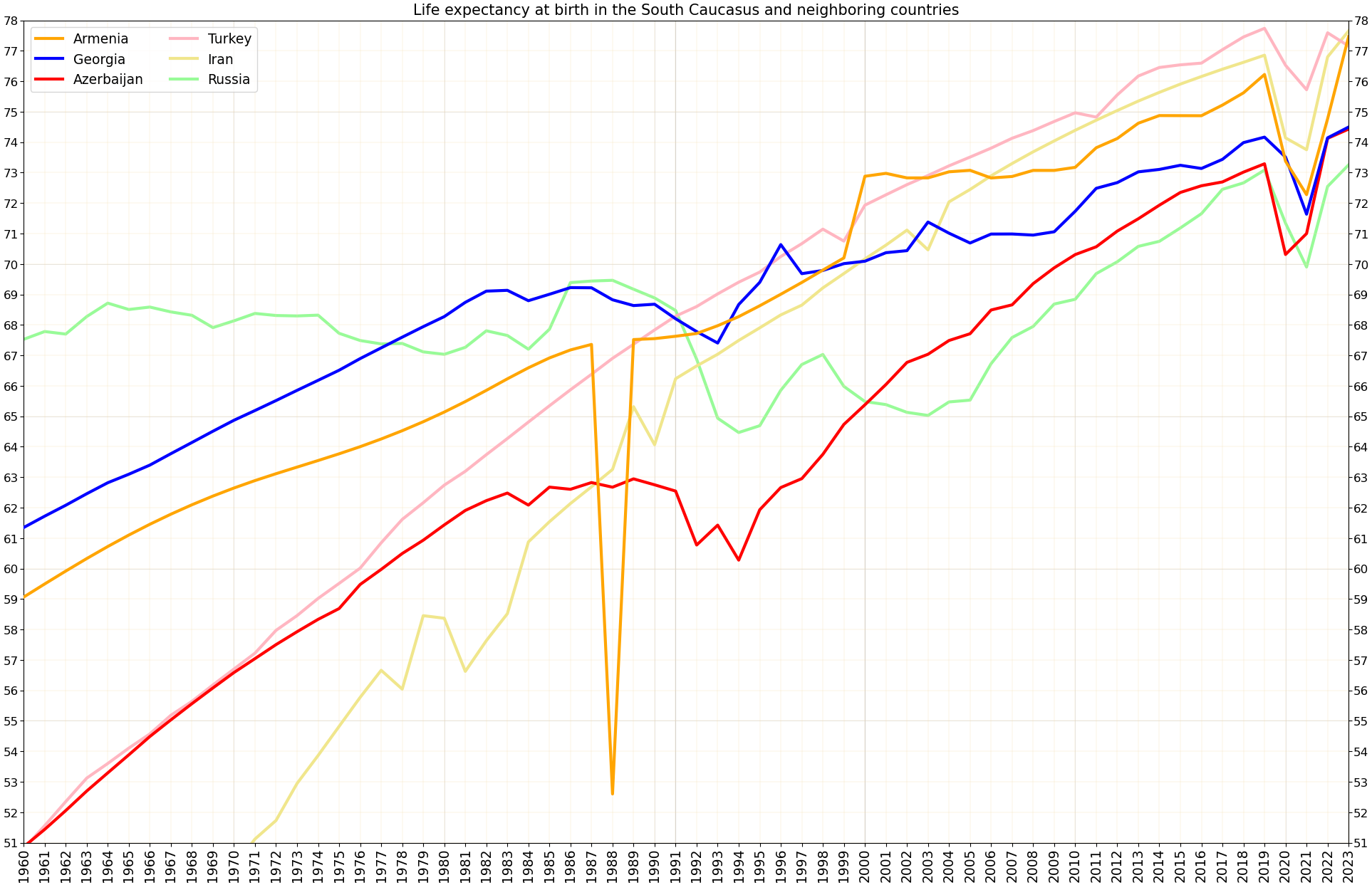
Life expectancy in countries of the South Caucasus and neighboring countries, 2022

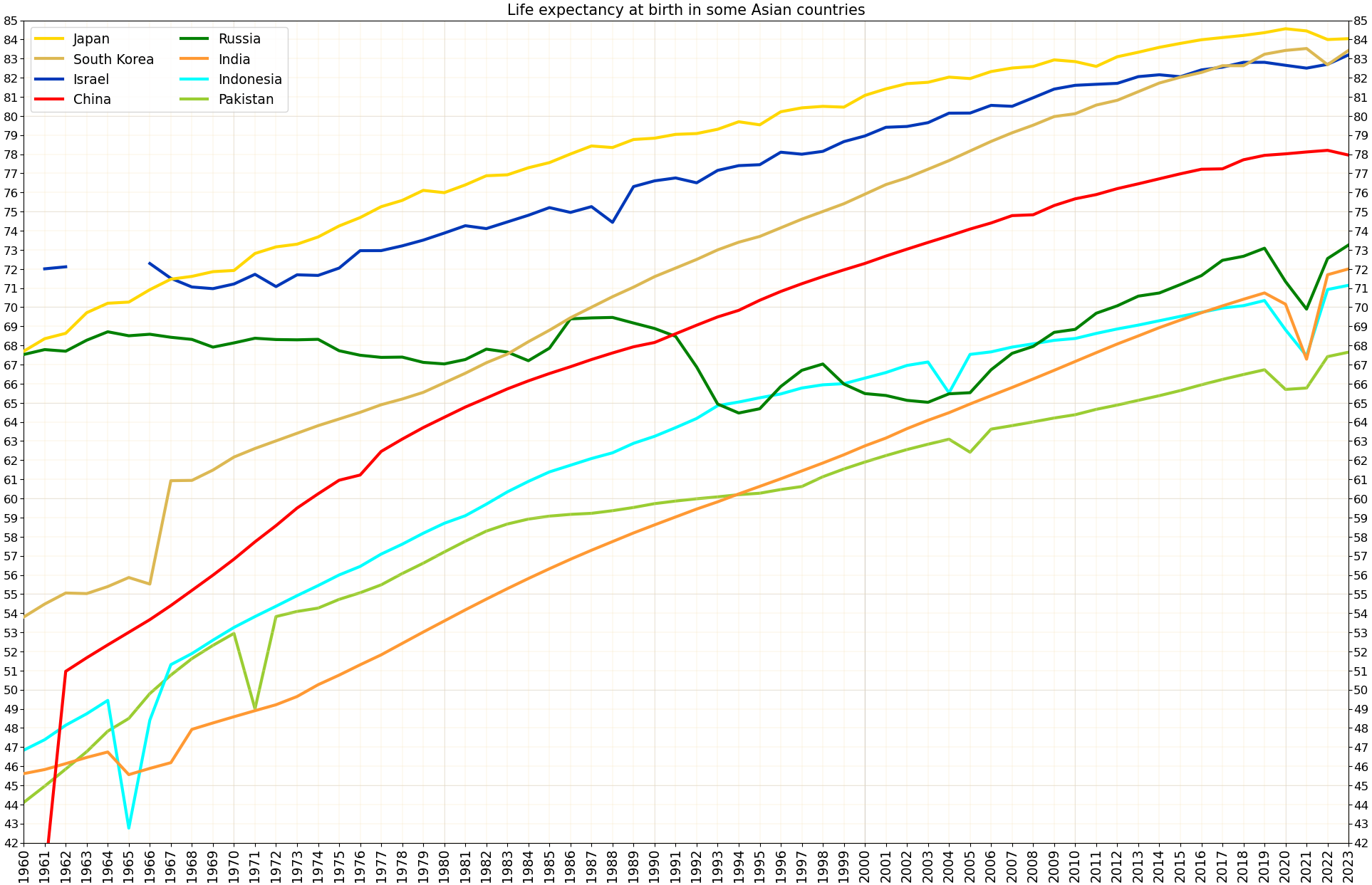
Life expectancy in some Asian countries, 2022

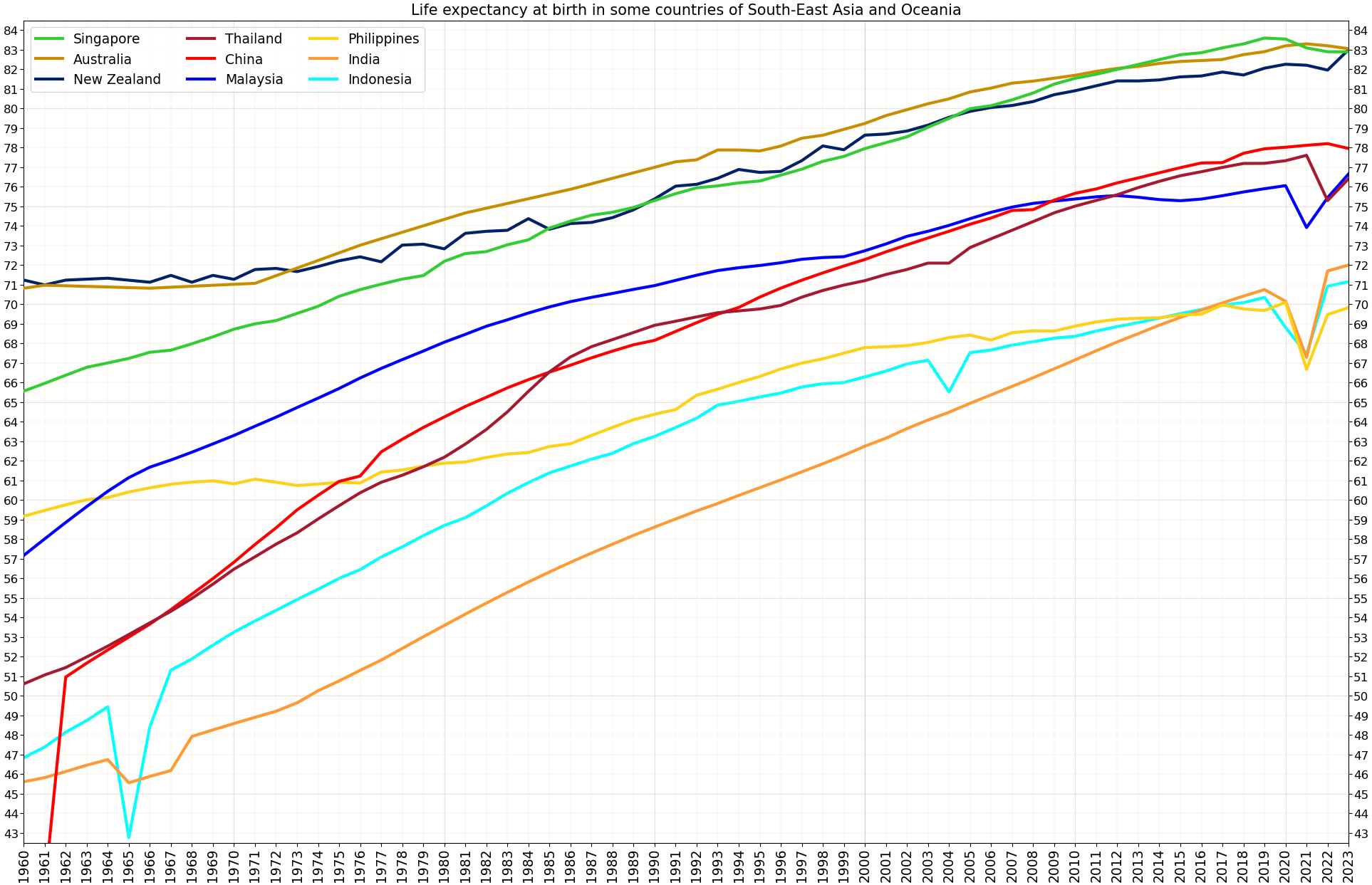
Life expectancy in some countries of South-East Asia and Oceania, 2022

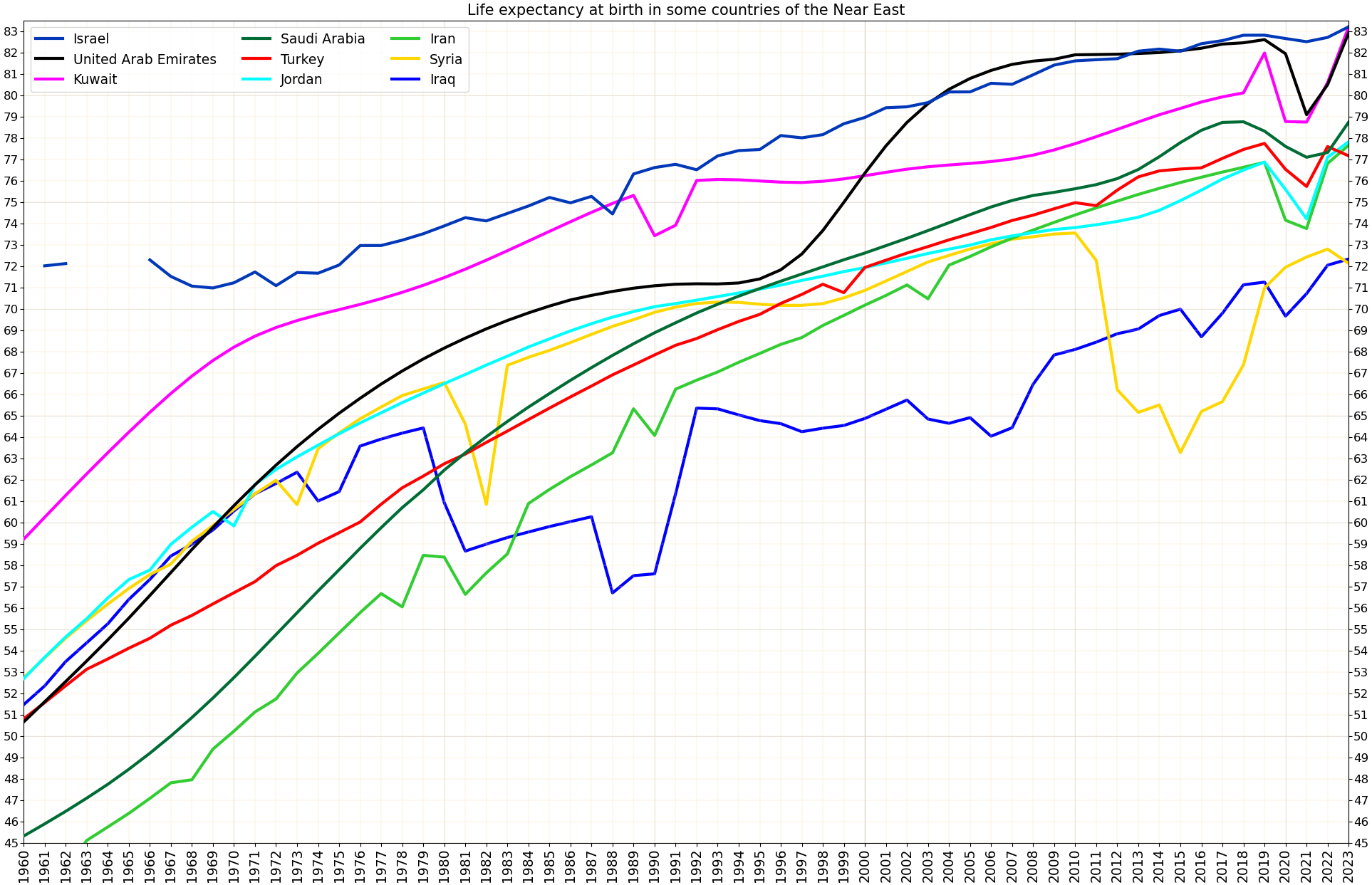
Life expectancy at birth in some countries of the Near East, 2022

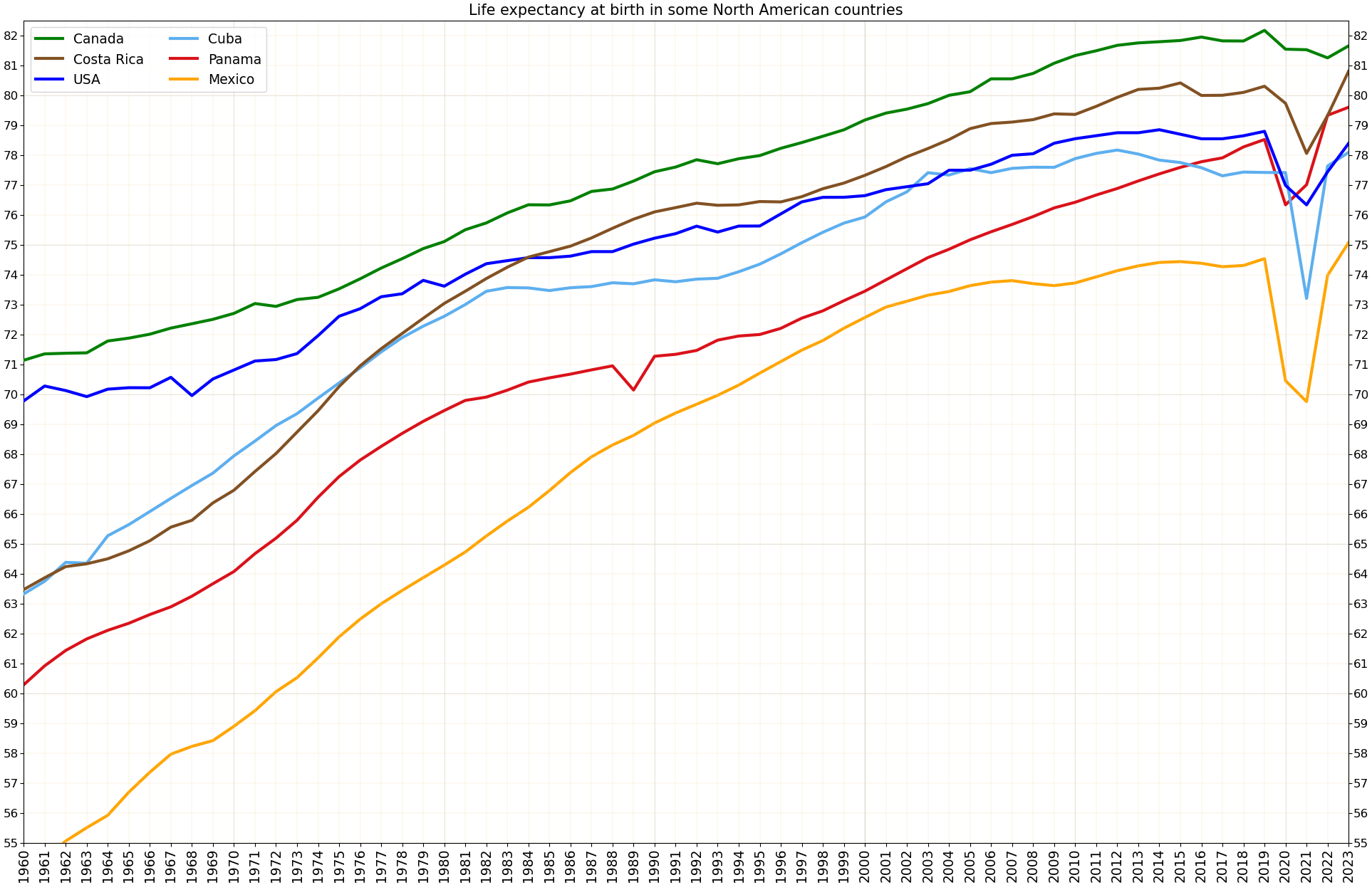
Life expectancy in some North American countries, 2022

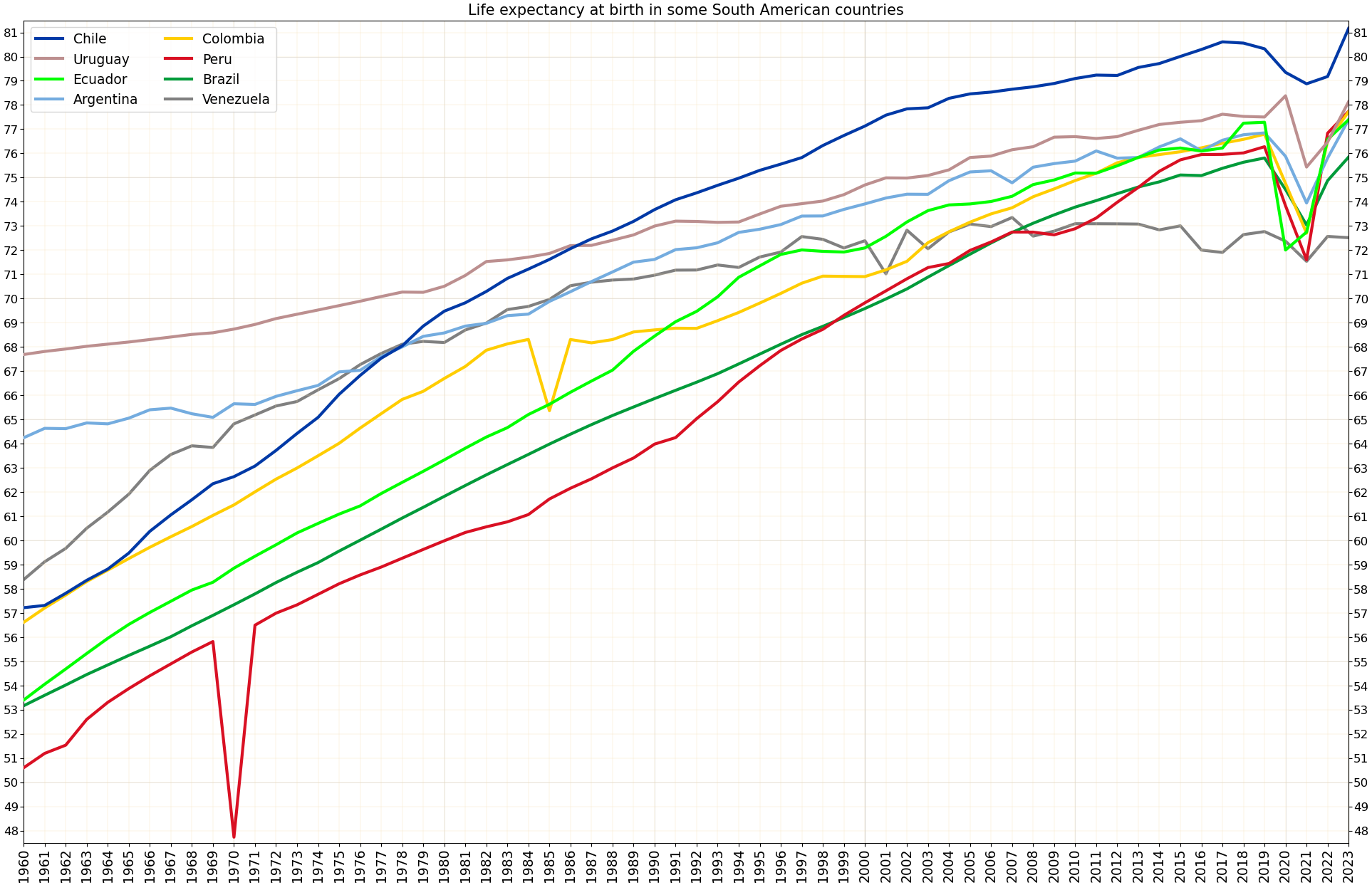
Life expectancy in some South American countries, 2022

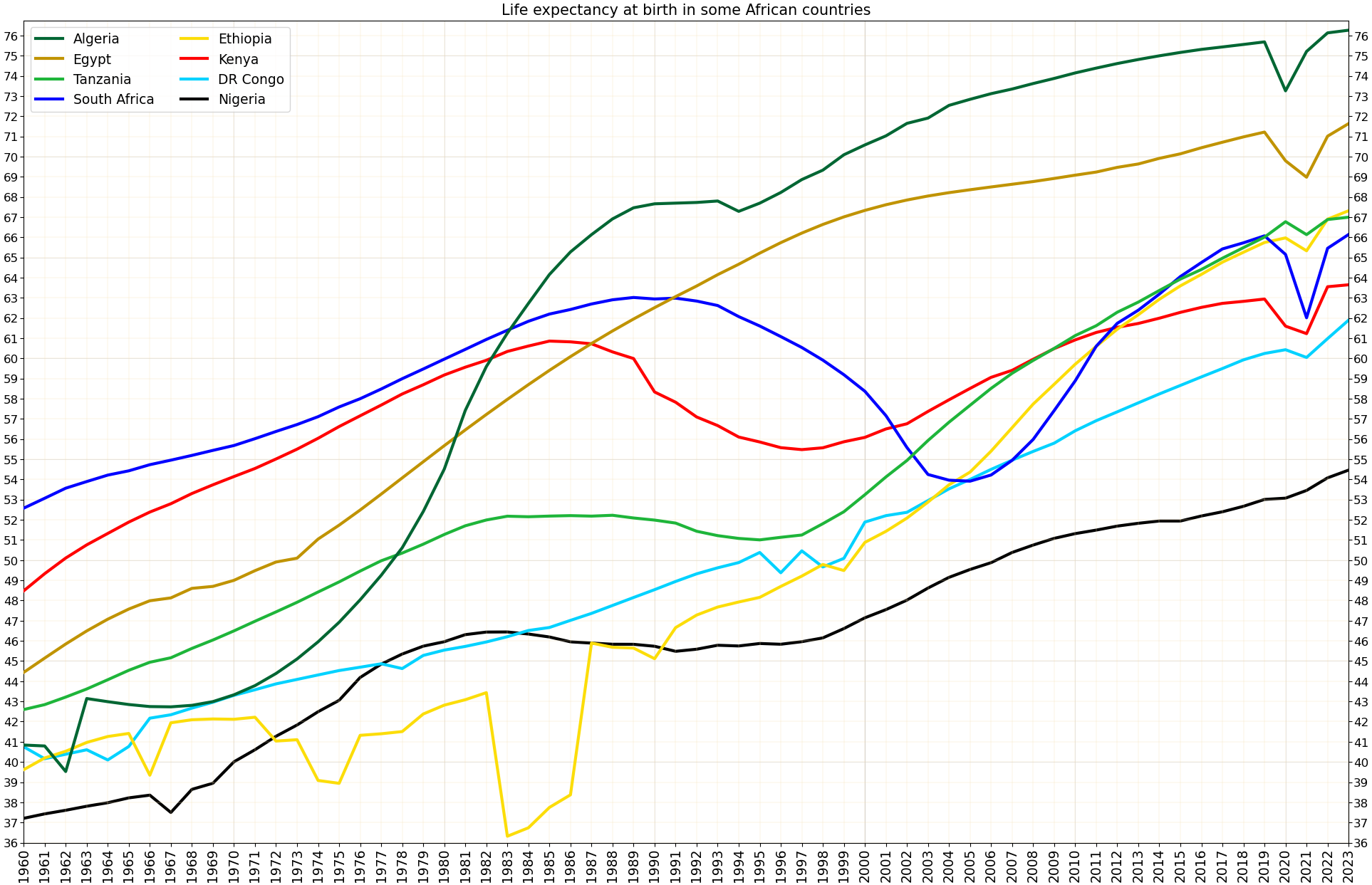
Life expectancy in some African countries, 2022

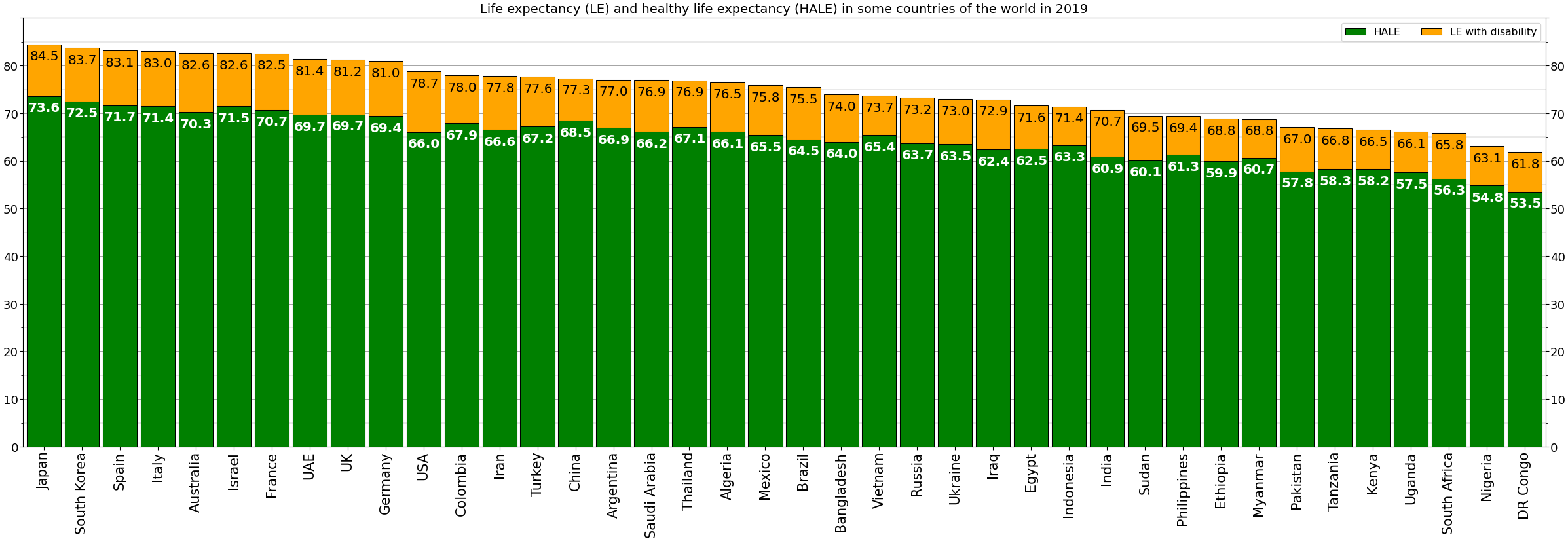
International life expectancy and healthy life expectancy, 2019

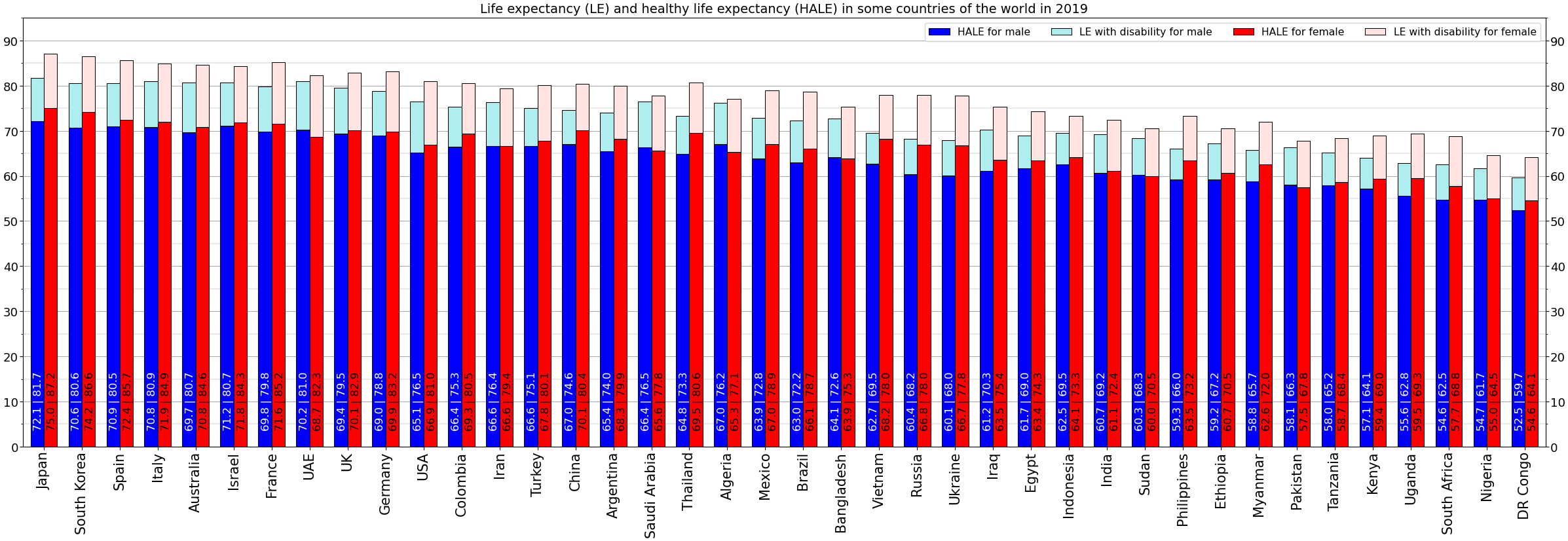
International life expectancy and healthy life expectancy for males and females, 2019

== See also ==
- Health equity#Gender disparities in life expectancy
- Health survival paradox
- Homicide statistics by gender
- List of countries by total health expenditure per capita
- List of countries by past life expectancy
- List of European countries by life expectancy
- List of European regions by life expectancy
- List of Asian countries by life expectancy
- List of North American countries by life expectancy
- List of South American countries by life expectancy
- List of African countries by life expectancy
- List of Oceanian countries by life expectancy
- List of U.S. states and territories by life expectancy
- List of federal subjects of Russia by life expectancy
- List of world regions by life expectancy
- Oldest people
- Sex differences in medicine
