= Commonwealth Caribbean =

Caribbean countries and territories in the Commonwealth

- Map of the Commonwealth Caribbean Independent countries British Overseas Territories Other territories with English as an official language Other Caribbean countries

The Commonwealth Caribbean is a group of English-speaking sovereign states in the Caribbean, including both island states and mainland countries in the Americas, that are members of the Commonwealth of Nations and were once part of the British Empire. The term may also include British Overseas Territories in the Caribbean Sea.

== Nomenclature ==
Before decolonisation, British Crown colonies in the West Indies were collectively known as the British West Indies. After gaining independence, these countries became known as the Commonwealth Caribbean. It is also occasionally referred to as the Caribbean Commonwealth.

The Commonwealth Caribbean is also known as the English-speaking Caribbean, Anglophone Caribbean, Anglo-Caribbean, or English-speaking West Indies, although use of these terms may also be used in a manner that includes other English-speaking Caribbean countries that are not members of the Commonwealth of Nations.

== Countries and territories ==
The Commonwealth Caribbean encompasses sovereign states that are members of the Commonwealth. It includes islands in the Caribbean Sea and mainland regions of the Americas that border the Caribbean. British Overseas Territories in the Caribbean and North Atlantic Ocean are also sometimes grouped with the Commonwealth Caribbean.

The Bahamas is the largest English-speaking island country in the Caribbean by area, however, Jamaica is the largest island in the region. The largest in the region by area including countries with borders is Guyana.

=== Sovereign states ===
The Commonwealth Caribbean includes twelve sovereign states, made up of ten island nations in the Caribbean and two countries situated on the mainland of the Americas. These are:

Sovereign state	Population (2023)	Area (km^{2})	Commonwealth realm or a republic in the Commonwealth of Nations
Antigua and Barbuda	93,000	440 km^{2} (170 sq mi)	Realm
Bahamas	399,000	13,943 km^{2} (5,383 sq mi)	Realm
Barbados	282,000	439 km^{2} (169 sq mi)	Republic
Belize (Note: Belize and Guyana, though situated on the mainland of the Americas, have coastlines along the Caribbean Sea and are frequently categorized together with other Commonwealth Caribbean states.)	411,000	22,966 km^{2} (8,867 sq mi)	Realm
Dominica	67,000	750 km^{2} (290 sq mi)	Republic
Grenada	117,000	344 km^{2} (133 sq mi)	Realm
Guyana	826,000	214,969 km^{2} (83,000 sq mi)	Republic
Jamaica	2,840,000	10,991 km^{2} (4,244 sq mi)	Realm
Saint Kitts and Nevis	47,000	261 km^{2} (101 sq mi)	Realm
Saint Lucia	179,000	617 km^{2} (238 sq mi)	Realm
Saint Vincent and the Grenadines	101,000	389 km^{2} (150 sq mi)	Realm
Trinidad and Tobago	1,503,000	5,131 km^{2} (1,981 sq mi)	Republic

=== British Overseas Territories ===
The term "Commonwealth Caribbean" may also apply to British Overseas Territories in the Caribbean, as they are English-speaking and the United Kingdom is a member of the Commonwealth. However, more specific terms, such as "British Overseas Territories in the Caribbean," "British Caribbean territories," and the older "British West Indies" are typically used to refer exclusively to these territories.

These five British Overseas Territories include:

British Overseas Territory	Population (2023)	Area (km^{2})
Anguilla	14,000	91 km^{2} (35 sq mi)
British Virgin Islands	39,000	153 km^{2} (59 sq mi)
Cayman Islands	73,000	259 km^{2} (100 sq mi)
Montserrat	4,000	102 km^{2} (39 sq mi)
Turks and Caicos Islands	46,000	948 km^{2} (366 sq mi)

The British territory of Bermuda is sometimes considered part of the Commonwealth Caribbean. However, Bermuda is neither geologically nor spatially associated with the Caribbean, which lies 1,300 square kilometres (500 mi^{2}) to the south and southwest of Bermuda.

== Intergovernmental organisations and unions ==
Since the mid-20th century, several political and economic unions were formed involving Commonwealth Caribbean states.

Besides economic and political unions, the national cricket associations of several Commonwealth Caribbean countries and British Overseas Territories are members of Cricket West Indies. While its membership primarily made up of associations from Commonwealth Caribbean, Cricket West Indies also includes representatives from two non-Commonwealth territories, Sint Maarten of the Dutch Caribbean and the United States Virgin Islands. The organisation fields a composite team, the West Indies cricket team, which competes in International Cricket Council-recognized tournaments.

=== West Indies Federation (1958–62) ===
The Caribbean with West Indies Federation members in red. The short-lived federation was made up of British West Indies colonies from 1958–62.

Between 1958 and 1962, there was a short-lived federation between several English-speaking Caribbean countries, called the West Indies Federation. It included the Crown colonies that made up the British West Indies, including Barbados, Jamaica, Trinidad and Tobago, the British Leeward Islands and the British Windward Islands.

=== Caribbean Free Trade Association (1965–1973) ===
The Caribbean Free Trade Association (CARIFTA) was established on 15 December 1965, with Antigua and Barbuda, Barbados, Guyana, and Trinidad and Tobago as its founding members. The organisation aimed to integrate the economies of the newly formed sovereign states of the British West Indies by providing an agreement for free trade and encouraging "balanced development" in the region. Seven additional members were added to CARIFTA in 1968, Dominica, Grenada, Jamaica, Montserrat, Saint Christopher-Nevis-Anguilla, Saint Lucia, and St Vincent and the Grenadines. In 1971, British Honduras joined the organisation. In 1973, CARIFTA was replaced by the Caribbean Community.

=== Caribbean Community (1973–present) ===
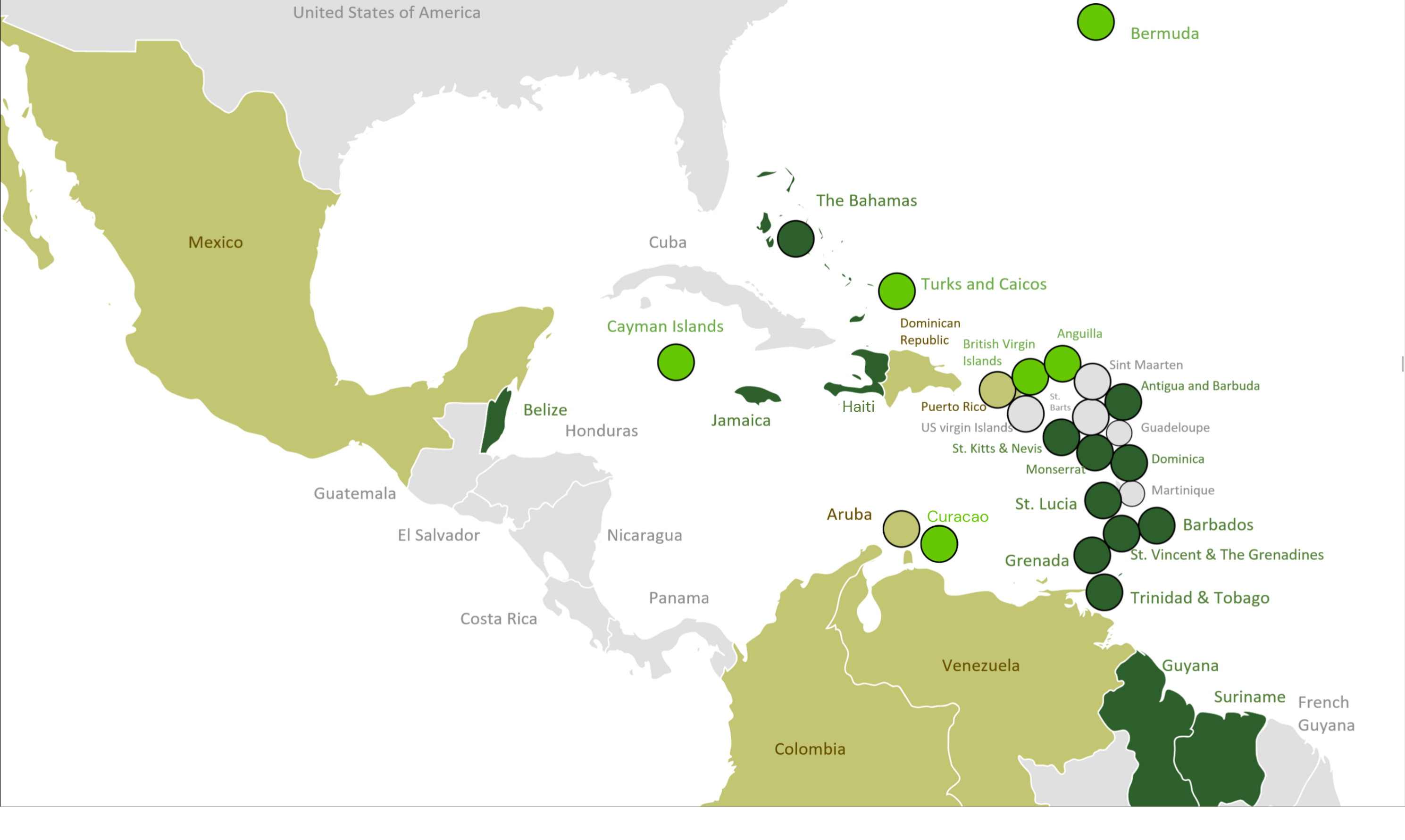
Full members Associate members Observers The Caribbean Community includes all Commonwealth Caribbean sovereign states, in addition to Montserrat, Haiti, and Suriname.

The English-speaking parts of the Caribbean established the Caribbean Community (CARICOM) in 1973, and it currently includes all the independent English-speaking island countries plus Belize, Guyana and Montserrat, as well as all other British Caribbean territories and Bermuda as associate members. English was its sole official language until 1995, following the addition of Dutch-speaking Suriname.

== Wider Anglophone communities in the region ==
The term Commonwealth Caribbean does not encompass all of the English-speaking Caribbean, as there are Caribbean islands where English is a primary or secondary language that are not part of the Commonwealth of Nations, including islands that are or were once British colonies. Accordingly, broader terms such as Anglophone Caribbean, English-speaking Caribbean, Anglo-Caribbean, and English-speaking West Indies are also used to refer to the wider English-speaking Caribbean.

Non-Commonwealth Anglophone territories	Notes
Honduras Bay Islands	The Bay Islands are one of the 18 departments of Honduras, consisting primarily of the islands of Guanaja, Roatán, and Útila, along with a number of smaller islands. Historically settled by people from the United Kingdom (mainly England), the territory has remained primarily English-speaking, even though the islands were annexed by Honduras in the 1860s, largely due to their relative isolation from the rest of Honduras and due to immigration from other English-speaking areas of the Caribbean. Spanish remains the official language, and is the second-most spoken language, on the islands, and many people are bilingual in both English and Spanish.
United States; Puerto Rico; U.S. Virgin Islands	English has been one of the two official languages of Puerto Rico alongside Spanish as its predominant and primary language since 1902, this is due to the fact that Puerto Rico had remained under Spanish rule for more than 400 years from 1493 to 1898 and has remained an American Commonwealth since 1898. Because of this, English is taught in all Puerto Rican schools and is the primary language of all of the U.S. federal agencies in Puerto Rico. Its status as an official language however was briefly removed in 1991 but was brought back in 1993 and English has remained the co-official language of the Commonwealth since then. The U.S. Virgin Islands is another English-speaking territory in the Caribbean that is under the administration of the United States. English has been the predominant and official language since 1917 when the islands were transferred from Denmark to the United States. Under Danish rule, the official language was Danish, but it was solely the language of administration and was only spoken by Danish people, a tiny minority of the overall population that primarily occupied administrative roles in colonial Danish West Indian society. Since both the U.S. Virgin Islands and Puerto Rico are owned by the United States, it is not considered to be a part of the Commonwealth. Virgin Islands Creole English, which is an English-based creole locally known as "dialect", is spoken in informal situations. The form of Virgin Islands Creole spoken on Saint Croix, known as Crucian, is slightly different from the ones that are spoken on Saint Thomas and Saint John.
Netherlands; Sint Maarten; Saba; Sint Eustatius	The official language is Dutch, but English is the "language of everyday life" on the island and education is solely in English. A local English-based creole language is also spoken informally, locally known as the Netherlands Antilles Creole English. More than 52% of the population speaks more than one language. Both English and Dutch are spoken and understood on the island and taught in schools, and both languages are official. Despite the island's Dutch affiliation, English is the principal language spoken on the island and has been used in its school system since the 19th century. Dutch is only spoken by 32% of the population. English is the sole medium of instruction in Saba schools. Dutch government policy towards Saba and other SSS islands promotes English-medium education. Sint Maarten, a constituent country of the Kingdom of the Netherlands, is also a majority English-speaking territory in the Caribbean. However, as with the Kingdom of the Netherlands, it isn't a part of the Commonwealth. English is the day-to-day administrative language and language of communication in Sint Maarten, and the first language of the majority (67.5%) of the population. A local variety of Virgin Islands Creole is spoken in informal situations by Sint Maarteners between themselves. Local signage uses both Dutch and English. The main languages are English and Dutch. There were English-medium and Dutch-medium schools in Sint Maarten, and the Dutch government policy towards St. Maarten and other SSS islands promoted English-medium education.
France; Saint Martin	Although French is the sole official language of the territory, use of English on the island dates back to 1600s, and a local English-based creole language is spoken in informal situations on both the French and Dutch sides of the island, it is known locally as Saint Martin English.

== See also ==
- Anglo-America
- British America
- British West Indies
- Caribbean English
- Languages of the Caribbean

=== Other parts of the Caribbean ===
- Danish West Indies – Danish colony in the Caribbean (1672–1917)
- Dutch Caribbean – Caribbean territories of the Kingdom of the Netherlands
- Latin America and the Caribbean – Subregion of the Americas
- Latin Caribbean (disambiguation)
  - French West Indies – French territories in the Caribbean
  - Spanish West Indies – Spanish colony from 1492 to 1898
