= IETF language tag =

Code to identify human languages

An IETF BCP 47 language tag is a standardized code that is used to identify human languages on the Internet. The tag structure has been standardized by the Internet Engineering Task Force (IETF) in Best Current Practice (BCP) 47; the subtags are maintained by the IANA Language Subtag Registry.

To distinguish language variants for countries, regions, or writing systems (scripts), IETF language tags combine subtags from other standards such as ISO 639, ISO 15924, ISO 3166-1 and UN M.49. For example, the tag en stands for English; es-419 for Latin American Spanish; rm-sursilv for Romansh Sursilvan; sr-Cyrl for Serbian written in Cyrillic script; nan-Hant-TW for Minnan using traditional Han characters, as spoken in Taiwan; yue-Hant-HK for Cantonese using traditional Han characters, as spoken in Hong Kong; and gsw-u-sd-chzh for Zürich German.

It is used by computing standards such as HTTP, HTML, XML and PNG.

== History ==
IETF language tags were first defined in Request for comment 1766, edited by Harald Tveit Alvestrand, published in March 1995. The tags used ISO 639 two-letter language codes and ISO 3166 two-letter country codes, and allowed registration of whole tags that included variant or script subtags of three to eight letters.

In January 2001, this was updated by RFC 3066, which added the use of ISO 639-2 three-letter codes, permitted subtags with digits, and adopted the concept of language ranges from HTTP/1.1 to help with matching of language tags.

The next revision of the specification came in September 2006 with the publication of RFC 4646—the main part of the specification—edited by Addison Philips and Mark Davis, and RFC 4647—which deals with matching behaviour. RFC 4646 introduced a more structured format for language tags, added the use of ISO 15924 four-letter script codes and UN M.49 three-digit geographical region codes, and replaced the old registry of tags with a new registry of subtags. The small number of previously defined tags that did not conform to the new structure were grandfathered in order to maintain compatibility with RFC 3066.

The current version of the specification, RFC 5646, was published in September 2009. The main purpose of this revision was to incorporate three-letter codes from ISO 639-3 and 639-5 into the Language Subtag Registry, in order to increase the interoperability between ISO 639 and BCP 47.

== Syntax of language tags ==
Each language tag is composed of one or more "subtags" separated by hyphens (-). Each subtag is composed only of either basic Latin letters or digits.

With the exceptions of private-use language tags beginning with an x- prefix and grandfathered language tags (including those starting with an i- prefix and those previously registered in the old Language Tag Registry), subtags occur in the following order:

- A single primary language subtag based on a two-letter language code from ISO 639-1 (2002) or a three-letter code from ISO 639-2 (1998), ISO 639-3 (2007) or ISO 639-5 (2008), or registered through the BCP 47 process and composed of five to eight letters
- Up to three optional extended language subtags composed of three letters each, separated by hyphens. (There is currently no extended language subtag registered in the Language Subtag Registry without an equivalent and preferred primary language subtag. This component of language tags is preserved for backward compatibility and to allow for future parts of ISO 639.)
- An optional script subtag, based on a four-letter script code from ISO 15924 (usually written in title case)
- An optional region subtag based on a two-letter country code from ISO 3166-1 alpha-2 (usually written in upper case), or a three-digit code from UN M.49 for geographical regions
- Optional variant subtags, separated by hyphens, each composed of five to eight letters, or of four characters starting with a digit. (Variant subtags are registered with IANA and not associated with any external standard.)
- Optional extension subtags, separated by hyphens, each composed of a single character, with the exception of the letter x, and a hyphen followed by one or more subtags of two to eight characters each, separated by hyphens
- An optional private-use subtag, composed of the letter x and a hyphen followed by subtags of one to eight characters each, separated by hyphens

Subtags are not case-sensitive, but the specification recommends using the same case as in the Language Subtag Registry, where region subtags are UPPERCASE, script subtags are title case, and all other subtags are lowercase. This capitalization follows the recommendations of the underlying ISO standards.

Optional script and region subtags are preferred to be omitted when they add no distinguishing information to a language tag. For example, es is preferred over es-Latn, as Spanish is fully expected to be written in the Latin script; ja is preferred over ja-JP, as Japanese as used in Japan does not differ markedly from Japanese as used elsewhere.

Not all linguistic regions can be represented with a valid region subtag: the subnational regional dialects of a primary language are registered as variant subtags. For example, the valencia variant subtag for the Valencian variant of the Catalan is registered in the Language Subtag Registry with the prefix ca. As this dialect is spoken almost exclusively in Spain, the region subtag ES can normally be omitted.

Furthermore, there are script tags that do not refer to traditional scripts such as Latin, or even scripts at all, and these usually begin with a Z. For example, Zsye refers to emojis, Zmth to mathematical notation, Zxxx to unwritten documents and Zyyy to undetermined scripts.

IETF language tags have been used as locale identifiers in many applications. It may be necessary for these applications to establish their own strategy for defining, encoding and matching locales if the strategy described in RFC 4647 is not adequate.

The use, interpretation and matching of IETF language tags is currently defined in RFC 5646 and RFC 4647. The Language Subtag Registry lists all currently valid public subtags. Private-use subtags are not included in the Registry as they are implementation-dependent and subject to private agreements between third parties using them. These private agreements are out of scope of BCP 47.

== List of common primary language subtags ==
The following is a list of some of the more commonly used primary language subtags. The list represents only a small subset (less than 2 percent) of primary language subtags; for full information, the Language Subtag Registry should be consulted directly.

Common languages and their IETF subtags
English name	Native name	Subtag
Afrikaans	Afrikaans	af
Amharic	አማርኛ	am
Arabic	العربية	ar
Mapudungun	Mapudungun	arn
Moroccan Arabic	الدارجة المغربية	ary
Assamese	অসমীয়া	as
Azerbaijani	Azərbaycan	az
Bashkir	Башҡорт	ba
Belarusian	беларуская	be
Bulgarian	български	bg
Bengali	বাংলা	bn
Tibetan	བོད་ཡིག	bo
Breton	brezhoneg	br
Bosnian	bosanski/босански	bs
Catalan	català	ca
Central Kurdish	کوردیی ناوەندی	ckb
Corsican	Corsu	co
Czech	čeština	cs
Welsh	Cymraeg	cy
Danish	dansk	da
German	Deutsch	de
Lower Sorbian	dolnoserbšćina	dsb
Divehi	ދިވެހިބަސް	dv
Greek	Ελληνικά	el
English	English	en
Spanish	español	es
Estonian	eesti	et
Basque	euskara	eu
Persian	فارسى	fa
Finnish	suomi	fi
Filipino	Filipino	fil
Faroese	føroyskt	fo
French	français	fr
Frisian	Frysk	fy
Irish	Gaeilge	ga
Scottish Gaelic	Gàidhlig	gd
Gilbertese	Taetae ni Kiribati	gil
Galician	galego	gl
Swiss German	Schweizerdeutsch	gsw
Gujarati	ગુજરાતી	gu
Hausa	Hausa	ha
Hebrew	עברית	he
Hindi	हिंदी	hi
Croatian	hrvatski	hr
Upper Sorbian	hornjoserbšćina	hsb
Hungarian	magyar	hu
Armenian	Հայերեն	hy
Indonesian	Bahasa Indonesia	id
Igbo	Igbo	ig
Yi	ꆈꌠꁱꂷ	ii
Icelandic	íslenska	is
Italian	italiano	it
Inuktitut	Inuktitut/ ᐃᓄᒃᑎᑐᑦ (ᑲᓇᑕ)	iu
Japanese	日本語	ja
Georgian	ქართული	ka
Kazakh	Қазақша	kk
Greenlandic	kalaallisut	kl
Khmer	ខ្មែរ	km
Kannada	ಕನ್ನಡ	kn
Korean	한국어	ko
Konkani	कोंकणी	kok
Kurdish	Kurdî کوردی	ku
Kyrgyz	Кыргыз	ky
Luxembourgish	Lëtzebuergesch	lb
Lao	ລາວ	lo
Lithuanian	lietuvių	lt
Latvian	latviešu	lv
Māori	Reo Māori	mi
Macedonian	македонски јазик	mk
Malayalam	മലയാളം	ml
Mongolian	Монгол хэл/ ᠮᠤᠨᠭᠭᠤᠯ ᠬᠡᠯᠡ	mn
Mohawk	Kanien'kéha	moh
Marathi	मराठी	mr
Malay	Bahasa Malaysia	ms
Maltese	Malti	mt
Burmese	မြန်မာဘာသာ	my
Norwegian (Bokmål)	norsk (bokmål)	nb
Nepali	नेपाली (नेपाल)	ne
Dutch	Nederlands	nl
Norwegian (Nynorsk)	norsk (nynorsk)	nn
Norwegian	norsk	no
Occitan	occitan	oc
Odia	ଓଡ଼ିଆ	or
Papiamento	Papiamentu	pap
Punjabi	ਪੰਜਾਬੀ پنجابی	pa
Polish	polski	pl
Dari	درى	prs
Pashto	پښتو	ps
Portuguese	português	pt
K'iche	K'iche	quc
Quechua	runasimi	qu
Romansh	Rumantsch	rm
Romanian	română	ro
Russian	русский	ru
Kinyarwanda	Kinyarwanda	rw
Sanskrit	संस्कृत	sa
Yakut	саха	sah
Sindhi	سِنڌِي	sd
Sami (Northern)	davvisámegiella	se
Sinhala	සිංහල	si
Slovak	slovenčina	sk
Slovenian	slovenščina	sl
Sami (Southern)	åarjelsaemiengiele	sma
Sami (Lule)	julevusámegiella	smj
Sami (Inari)	sämikielâ	smn
Sami (Skolt)	sääʹmǩiõll	sms
Albanian	shqip	sq
Serbian	srpski/српски	sr
Sesotho	Sesotho	st
Swedish	svenska	sv
Kiswahili	Kiswahili	sw
Syriac	ܣܘܪܝܝܐ	syc
Tamil	தமிழ்	ta
Telugu	తెలుగు	te
Tajik	Тоҷикӣ	tg
Thai	ไทย	th
Turkmen	türkmençe	tk
Tagalog	Tagalog	tl
Tswana	Setswana	tn
Turkish	Türkçe	tr
Tatar	Татарча	tt
Tamazight	Tamazight	tzm
Uyghur	ئۇيغۇرچە	ug
Ukrainian	українська	uk
Urdu	اُردو	ur
Uzbek	Uzbek/Ўзбек	uz
Vietnamese	Tiếng Việt	vi
Wolof	Wolof	wo
Xhosa	isiXhosa	xh
Yiddish	יידיש	yi
Yoruba	Yoruba	yo
Chinese	中文	zh
Zulu	isiZulu	zu

== Relation to other standards ==
Although some types of subtags are derived from ISO or UN core standards, they do not follow these standards absolutely, as this could lead to the meaning of language tags changing over time. In particular, a subtag derived from a code assigned by ISO 639, ISO 15924, ISO 3166, or UN M49 remains a valid (though deprecated) subtag even if the code is withdrawn from the corresponding core standard. If the standard later assigns a new meaning to the withdrawn code, the corresponding subtag will still retain its old meaning.

This stability was introduced in RFC 4646.

=== ISO 639-3 and ISO 639-1 ===
RFC 4646 defined the concept of an "extended language subtag" (sometimes referred to as extlang), although no such subtags were registered at that time.

RFC 5645 and RFC 5646 added primary language subtags corresponding to ISO 639-3 codes for all languages that did not already exist in the Registry. In addition, codes for languages encompassed by certain macrolanguages were registered as extended language subtags. Sign languages were also registered as extlangs, with the prefix sgn. These languages may be represented either with the subtag for the encompassed language alone (cmn for Mandarin) or with a language-extlang combination (zh-cmn). The first option is preferred for most purposes. The second option is called "extlang form" and is new in RFC 5646.

Whole tags that were registered prior to RFC 4646 and are now classified as "grandfathered" or "redundant" (depending on whether they fit the new syntax) are deprecated in favor of the corresponding ISO 639-3–based language subtag, if one exists. To list a few examples, nan is preferred over zh-min-nan for Minnan; hak is preferred over i-hak and zh-hakka for Hakka; and ase is preferred over sgn-US for American Sign Language.

Windows Vista and later versions of Microsoft Windows have RFC 4646 support.

=== ISO 639-5 and ISO 639-1/2 ===
ISO 639-5 defines language collections with alpha-3 codes in a different way than they were initially encoded in ISO 639-2 (including one code already present in ISO 639-1, Bihari coded inclusively as bh in ISO 639-1 and bih in ISO 639-2). Specifically, the language collections are now all defined in ISO 639-5 as inclusive, rather than some of them being defined exclusively. This means that language collections have a broader scope than before, in some cases where they could encompass languages that were already encoded separately within ISO 639-2.

For example, the ISO 639-2 code afa was previously associated with the name "Afro-Asiatic (Other)", excluding languages such as Arabic that already had their own code. In ISO 639-5, this collection is named "Afro-Asiatic languages" and includes all such languages. ISO 639-2 changed the exclusive names in 2009 to match the inclusive ISO 639-5 names.

To avoid breaking implementations that may still depend on the older (exclusive) definition of these collections, ISO 639-5 defines a grouping type attribute for all collections that were already encoded in ISO 639-2 (such grouping type is not defined for the new collections added only in ISO 639-5).

BCP 47 defines a "Scope" property to identify subtags for language collections. However, it does not define any given collection as inclusive or exclusive, and does not use the ISO 639-5 grouping type attribute, although the description fields in the Language Subtag Registry for these subtags match the ISO 639-5 (inclusive) names. As a consequence, BCP 47 language tags that include a primary language subtag for a collection may be ambiguous as to whether the collection is intended to be inclusive or exclusive.

ISO 639-5 does not define precisely which languages are members of these collections; only the hierarchical classification of collections is defined, using the inclusive definition of these collections. Because of this, RFC 5646 does not recommend the use of subtags for language collections for most applications, although they are still preferred over subtags whose meaning is even less specific, such as "Multiple languages" and "Undetermined".

In contrast, the classification of individual languages within their macrolanguage is standardized, in both ISO 639-3 and the Language Subtag Registry.

=== ISO 15924, ISO/IEC 10646 and Unicode ===
Script subtags were first added to the Language Subtag Registry when RFC 4646 was published, from the list of codes defined in ISO 15924. They are encoded in the language tag after primary and extended language subtags, but before other types of subtag, including region and variant subtags.

Some primary language subtags are defined with a property named "Suppress-Script" which indicates the cases where a single script can usually be assumed by default for the language, even if it can be written with another script. When this is the case, it is preferable to omit the script subtag, to improve the likelihood of successful matching. A different script subtag can still be appended to make the distinction when necessary. For example, yi is preferred over yi-Hebr in most contexts, because the Hebrew script subtag is assumed for the Yiddish language.

As another example, zh-Hans-SG may be considered equivalent to zh-Hans, because the region code is probably not significant; the written form of Chinese used in Singapore uses the same simplified Chinese characters as in other countries where Chinese is written. However, the script subtag is maintained because it is significant.

ISO 15924 includes some codes for script variants (for example, Hans and Hant for simplified and traditional forms of Chinese characters) that are unified within Unicode and ISO/IEC 10646. These script variants are most often encoded for bibliographic purposes, but are not always significant from a linguistic point of view (for example, Latf and Latg script codes for the Fraktur and Gaelic variants of the Latin script, which are mostly encoded with regular Latin letters in Unicode and ISO/IEC 10646). They may occasionally be useful in language tags to expose orthographic or semantic differences, with different analysis of letters, diacritics, and digraphs/trigraphs as default grapheme clusters, or differences in letter casing rules.

=== ISO 3166-1 and UN M.49 ===
Two-letter region subtags are based on codes assigned, or "exceptionally reserved", in ISO 3166-1. If the ISO 3166 Maintenance Agency were to reassign a code that had previously been assigned to a different country, the existing BCP 47 subtag corresponding to that code would retain its meaning, and a new region subtag based on UN M.49 would be registered for the new country. UN M.49 is also the source for numeric region subtags for geographical regions, such as 005 for South America. The UN M.49 codes for economic regions are not allowed.

Region subtags are used to specify the variety of a language "as used in" a particular region. They are appropriate when the variety is regional in nature, and can be captured adequately by identifying the countries involved, as when distinguishing British English (en-GB) from American English (en-US). When the difference is one of script or script variety, as for simplified versus traditional Chinese characters, it should be expressed with a script subtag instead of a region subtag; in this example, zh-Hans and zh-Hant should be used instead of zh-CN/zh-SG/zh-MY and zh-TW/zh-HK/zh-MO.

When a distinct language subtag exists for a language that could be considered a regional variety, it is often preferable to use the more specific subtag instead of a language-region combination. For example, ar-DZ (Arabic as used in Algeria) may be better expressed as arq for Algerian Spoken Arabic.

=== Adherence to core standards ===
Disagreements about language identification may extend to BCP 47 and to the core standards that inform it. For example, some speakers of Punjabi believe that the ISO 639-3 distinction between [pan] "Panjabi" and [pnb] "Western Panjabi" is spurious (i.e. they feel the two are the same language); that sub-varieties of the Arabic script should be encoded separately in ISO 15924 (as, for example, the Fraktur and Gaelic styles of the Latin script are); and that BCP 47 should reflect these views or overrule the core standards with regard to them.

BCP 47 delegates this type of judgment to the core standards, and does not attempt to overrule or supersede them. Variant subtags and (theoretically) primary language subtags may be registered individually, but not in a way that contradicts the core standards.

== Extensions ==
Extension subtags (not to be confused with extended language subtags) allow additional information to be attached to a language tag that does not necessarily serve to identify a language. One use for extensions is to encode locale information, such as calendar and currency.

Extension subtags are composed of multiple hyphen-separated character strings, starting with a single character (other than x), called a singleton. Each extension is described in its own IETF RFC, which identifies a Registration Authority to manage the data for that extension. IANA is responsible for allocating singletons.

Two extensions have been assigned as of January 2014.

=== Extension T (Transformed Content) ===
Extension T allows a language tag to include information on how the tagged data was transliterated, transcribed, or otherwise transformed. For example, the tag en-t-jp could be used for content in English that was translated from the original Japanese. Additional substrings could indicate that the translation was done mechanically, or in accordance with a published standard.

Extension T is described in the informational RFC 6497, published in February 2012. The Registration Authority is the Unicode Consortium.

=== Extension U (Unicode Locale) ===
Extension U allows a wide variety of locale attributes found in the Common Locale Data Repository (CLDR) to be embedded in language tags. These attributes use keywords consisting of a mandatory two-letter key, which include country subdivisions (sd, rg), calendar (ca, fw, hc) and time zone (tz) data, collation order (co), currency type (cu) and format (cf), measurement (ms, mu) and number system (nu), line breaking (lb, lw, ss, dx), and emoji presentation (em), optionally followed by applicable, hyphenated types.

Some examples include:

- gsw-u-sd-chzh represents Swiss German as used in the Canton of Zurich.
- ar-u-nu-latn represents Arabic-language content using Basic Latin digits (0 through 9) instead of Arabic-script digits (٠ through ٩).
- he-IL-u-ca-hebrew-tz-jeruslm represents Hebrew as spoken in Israel, using the traditional Hebrew calendar, and in the "Asia/Jerusalem" time zone as identified in the tz database.

Extension U is described in the informational RFC 6067, published in December 2010. The Registration Authority is the Unicode Consortium. Its LDML specification, published as UTS 35, serves as the documentation of registered attributes and keywords.

== See also ==
- Codes for constructed languages
- Internationalization and localization
- Locale (computer software)
