= List of countries and territories by the United Nations geoscheme =

Overview of the UN system for grouping the world's 248 countries and territories

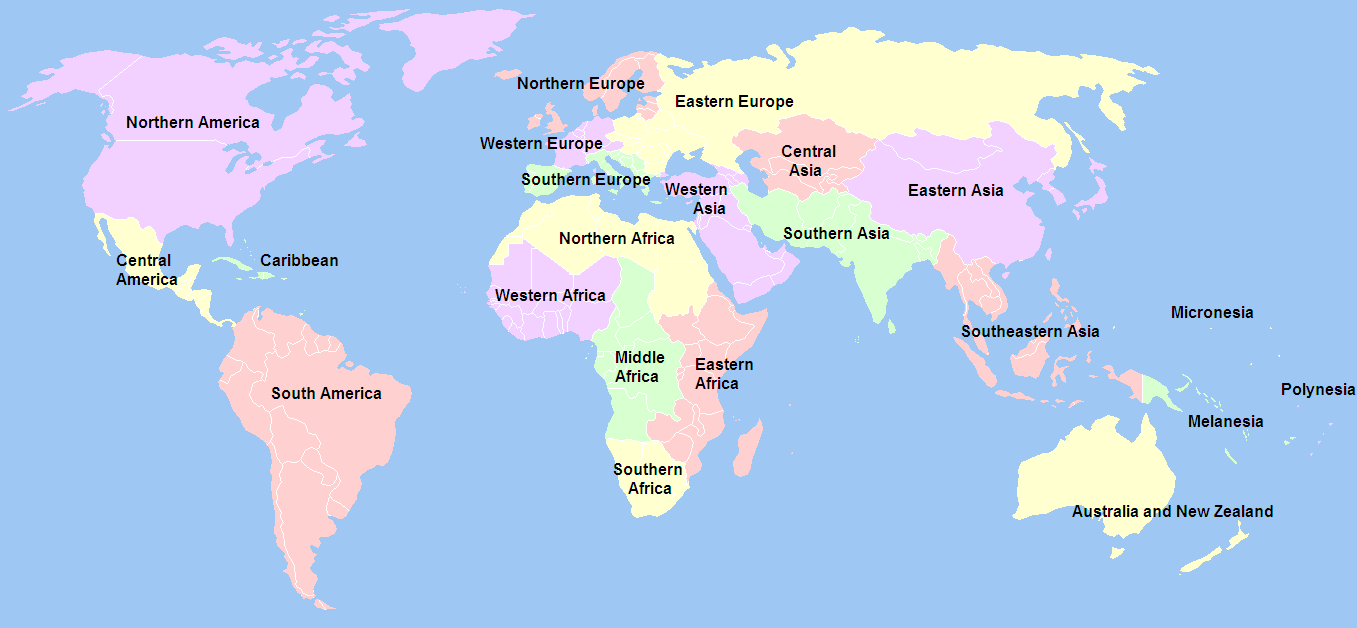
22 geographical subregions as defined by the UNSD. Antarctica (Note: A continental region with no geographical subregions.) is not shown.

This is a list of countries and territories by the United Nations geoscheme, including 193 UN member states, two UN observer states (the Holy See (Note: The sovereign entity with statehood over the territory of the Vatican City State.) and Palestine), two states in free association with New Zealand (the Cook Islands and Niue), and 49 non-sovereign dependencies or territories, as well as Western Sahara (a disputed territory whose sovereignty is contested) and Antarctica.

In total, 248 countries and territories have been listed. Not included in the list are seven de facto states (whose sovereignty are not recognised by the United Nations), the Sovereign Base Areas of Akrotiri and Dhekelia (SBA), and four uninhabited territories (the Ashmore and Cartier Islands, Clipperton Island, the Coral Sea Islands, and Navassa Island).

Kosovo and Taiwan (listed as Taiwan Province of China) have been separately listed for strictly statistical purposes.

== Lists ==
The United Nations geoscheme was created for statistical analysis and consists of six continental regions, 22 geographical subregions, and two intermediary regions.

The United Nations Statistics Division created and maintains the M49 – Standard country or area codes for statistical use. The codes are listed from smallest to largest region, left to right.

=== Current entries ===
Country or Area	Geographical subregion	Intermediary region (Note: North America is not an official intermediary region.)	Continental region	UNSD M49 Codes
Algeria	Northern Africa	—	Africa	012 < 015 < 002 < 001
Egypt	Northern Africa	—	Africa	818 < 015 < 002 < 001
Libya	Northern Africa	—	Africa	434 < 015 < 002 < 001
Morocco	Northern Africa	—	Africa	504 < 015 < 002 < 001
Sudan	Northern Africa	—	Africa	729 < 015 < 002 < 001
Tunisia	Northern Africa	—	Africa	788 < 015 < 002 < 001
Western Sahara (disputed)	Northern Africa	—	Africa	732 < 015 < 002 < 001
British Indian Ocean Territory	Eastern Africa	Sub-Saharan Africa	Africa	086 < 014 < 202 < 002 < 001
Burundi	Eastern Africa	Sub-Saharan Africa	Africa	108 < 014 < 202 < 002 < 001
Comoros	Eastern Africa	Sub-Saharan Africa	Africa	174 < 014 < 202 < 002 < 001
Djibouti	Eastern Africa	Sub-Saharan Africa	Africa	262 < 014 < 202 < 002 < 001
Eritrea	Eastern Africa	Sub-Saharan Africa	Africa	232 < 014 < 202 < 002 < 001
Ethiopia	Eastern Africa	Sub-Saharan Africa	Africa	231 < 014 < 202 < 002 < 001
French Southern Territories	Eastern Africa	Sub-Saharan Africa	Africa	260 < 014 < 202 < 002 < 001
Kenya	Eastern Africa	Sub-Saharan Africa	Africa	404 < 014 < 202 < 002 < 001
Madagascar	Eastern Africa	Sub-Saharan Africa	Africa	450 < 014 < 202 < 002 < 001
Malawi	Eastern Africa	Sub-Saharan Africa	Africa	454 < 014 < 202 < 002 < 001
Mauritius	Eastern Africa	Sub-Saharan Africa	Africa	480 < 014 < 202 < 002 < 001
Mayotte	Eastern Africa	Sub-Saharan Africa	Africa	175 < 014 < 202 < 002 < 001
Mozambique	Eastern Africa	Sub-Saharan Africa	Africa	508 < 014 < 202 < 002 < 001
Réunion	Eastern Africa	Sub-Saharan Africa	Africa	638 < 014 < 202 < 002 < 001
Rwanda	Eastern Africa	Sub-Saharan Africa	Africa	646 < 014 < 202 < 002 < 001
Seychelles	Eastern Africa	Sub-Saharan Africa	Africa	690 < 014 < 202 < 002 < 001
Somalia	Eastern Africa	Sub-Saharan Africa	Africa	706 < 014 < 202 < 002 < 001
South Sudan	Eastern Africa	Sub-Saharan Africa	Africa	728 < 014 < 202 < 002 < 001
Uganda	Eastern Africa	Sub-Saharan Africa	Africa	800 < 014 < 202 < 002 < 001
United Republic of Tanzania	Eastern Africa	Sub-Saharan Africa	Africa	834 < 014 < 202 < 002 < 001
Zambia	Eastern Africa	Sub-Saharan Africa	Africa	894 < 014 < 202 < 002 < 001
Zimbabwe	Eastern Africa	Sub-Saharan Africa	Africa	716 < 014 < 202 < 002 < 001
Angola	Middle Africa	Sub-Saharan Africa	Africa	024 < 017 < 202 < 002 < 001
Cameroon	Middle Africa	Sub-Saharan Africa	Africa	120 < 017 < 202 < 002 < 001
Central African Republic	Middle Africa	Sub-Saharan Africa	Africa	140 < 017 < 202 < 002 < 001
Chad	Middle Africa	Sub-Saharan Africa	Africa	148 < 017 < 202 < 002 < 001
Congo [Republic of the Congo]	Middle Africa	Sub-Saharan Africa	Africa	178 < 017 < 202 < 002 < 001
Democratic Republic of the Congo [DR Congo]	Middle Africa	Sub-Saharan Africa	Africa	180 < 017 < 202 < 002 < 001
Equatorial Guinea	Middle Africa	Sub-Saharan Africa	Africa	226 < 017 < 202 < 002 < 001
Gabon	Middle Africa	Sub-Saharan Africa	Africa	266 < 017 < 202 < 002 < 001
Sao Tome and Principe	Middle Africa	Sub-Saharan Africa	Africa	678 < 017 < 202 < 002 < 001
Botswana	Southern Africa	Sub-Saharan Africa	Africa	072 < 018 < 202 < 002 < 001
Eswatini [Swaziland]	Southern Africa	Sub-Saharan Africa	Africa	748 < 018 < 202 < 002 < 001
Lesotho	Southern Africa	Sub-Saharan Africa	Africa	426 < 018 < 202 < 002 < 001
Namibia	Southern Africa	Sub-Saharan Africa	Africa	516 < 018 < 202 < 002 < 001
South Africa	Southern Africa	Sub-Saharan Africa	Africa	710 < 018 < 202 < 002 < 001
Benin	Western Africa	Sub-Saharan Africa	Africa	204 < 011 < 202 < 002 < 001
Burkina Faso	Western Africa	Sub-Saharan Africa	Africa	854 < 011 < 202 < 002 < 001
Cabo Verde [Cape Verde]	Western Africa	Sub-Saharan Africa	Africa	132 < 011 < 202 < 002 < 001
Côte d'Ivoire [Ivory Coast]	Western Africa	Sub-Saharan Africa	Africa	384 < 011 < 202 < 002 < 001
Gambia	Western Africa	Sub-Saharan Africa	Africa	270 < 011 < 202 < 002 < 001
Ghana	Western Africa	Sub-Saharan Africa	Africa	288 < 011 < 202 < 002 < 001
Guinea	Western Africa	Sub-Saharan Africa	Africa	324 < 011 < 202 < 002 < 001
Guinea-Bissau	Western Africa	Sub-Saharan Africa	Africa	624 < 011 < 202 < 002 < 001
Liberia	Western Africa	Sub-Saharan Africa	Africa	430 < 011 < 202 < 002 < 001
Mali	Western Africa	Sub-Saharan Africa	Africa	466 < 011 < 202 < 002 < 001
Mauritania	Western Africa	Sub-Saharan Africa	Africa	478 < 011 < 202 < 002 < 001
Niger	Western Africa	Sub-Saharan Africa	Africa	562 < 011 < 202 < 002 < 001
Nigeria	Western Africa	Sub-Saharan Africa	Africa	566 < 011 < 202 < 002 < 001
Saint Helena [Saint Helena, Ascension and Tristan da Cunha]	Western Africa	Sub-Saharan Africa	Africa	654 < 011 < 202 < 002 < 001
Senegal	Western Africa	Sub-Saharan Africa	Africa	686 < 011 < 202 < 002 < 001
Sierra Leone	Western Africa	Sub-Saharan Africa	Africa	694 < 011 < 202 < 002 < 001
Togo	Western Africa	Sub-Saharan Africa	Africa	768 < 011 < 202 < 002 < 001
Anguilla	Caribbean	Latin America and the Caribbean; North America	Americas	660 < 029 < 419 / 003 < 019 < 001
Antigua and Barbuda	Caribbean	Latin America and the Caribbean; North America	Americas	028 < 029 < 419 / 003 < 019 < 001
Aruba	Caribbean	Latin America and the Caribbean; North America	Americas	533 < 029 < 419 / 003 < 019 < 001
Bahamas	Caribbean	Latin America and the Caribbean; North America	Americas	044 < 029 < 419 / 003 < 019 < 001
Barbados	Caribbean	Latin America and the Caribbean; North America	Americas	052 < 029 < 419 / 003 < 019 < 001
Bonaire, Sint Eustatius and Saba [Caribbean Netherlands]	Caribbean	Latin America and the Caribbean; North America	Americas	535 < 029 < 419 / 003 < 019 < 001
British Virgin Islands	Caribbean	Latin America and the Caribbean; North America	Americas	092 < 029 < 419 / 003 < 019 < 001
Cayman Islands	Caribbean	Latin America and the Caribbean; North America	Americas	136 < 029 < 419 / 003 < 019 < 001
Cuba	Caribbean	Latin America and the Caribbean; North America	Americas	192 < 029 < 419 / 003 < 019 < 001
Curaçao	Caribbean	Latin America and the Caribbean; North America	Americas	531 < 029 < 419 / 003 < 019 < 001
Dominica	Caribbean	Latin America and the Caribbean; North America	Americas	212 < 029 < 419 / 003 < 019 < 001
Dominican Republic	Caribbean	Latin America and the Caribbean; North America	Americas	214 < 029 < 419 / 003 < 019 < 001
Grenada	Caribbean	Latin America and the Caribbean; North America	Americas	308 < 029 < 419 / 003 < 019 < 001
Guadeloupe	Caribbean	Latin America and the Caribbean; North America	Americas	312 < 029 < 419 / 003 < 019 < 001
Haiti	Caribbean	Latin America and the Caribbean; North America	Americas	332 < 029 < 419 / 003 < 019 < 001
Jamaica	Caribbean	Latin America and the Caribbean; North America	Americas	388 < 029 < 419 / 003 < 019 < 001
Martinique	Caribbean	Latin America and the Caribbean; North America	Americas	474 < 029 < 419 / 003 < 019 < 001
Montserrat	Caribbean	Latin America and the Caribbean; North America	Americas	500 < 029 < 419 / 003 < 019 < 001
Puerto Rico	Caribbean	Latin America and the Caribbean; North America	Americas	630 < 029 < 419 / 003 < 019 < 001
Saint Barthélemy	Caribbean	Latin America and the Caribbean; North America	Americas	652 < 029 < 419 / 003 < 019 < 001
Saint Kitts and Nevis	Caribbean	Latin America and the Caribbean; North America	Americas	659 < 029 < 419 / 003 < 019 < 001
Saint Lucia	Caribbean	Latin America and the Caribbean; North America	Americas	662 < 029 < 419 / 003 < 019 < 001
Saint Martin (French part)	Caribbean	Latin America and the Caribbean; North America	Americas	663 < 029 < 419 / 003 < 019 < 001
Saint Vincent and the Grenadines	Caribbean	Latin America and the Caribbean; North America	Americas	670 < 029 < 419 / 003 < 019 < 001
Sint Maarten (Dutch part)	Caribbean	Latin America and the Caribbean; North America	Americas	534 < 029 < 419 / 003 < 019 < 001
Trinidad and Tobago	Caribbean	Latin America and the Caribbean; North America	Americas	780 < 029 < 419 / 003 < 019 < 001
Turks and Caicos Islands	Caribbean	Latin America and the Caribbean; North America	Americas	796 < 029 < 419 / 003 < 019 < 001
United States Virgin Islands	Caribbean	Latin America and the Caribbean; North America	Americas	850 < 029 < 419 / 003 < 019 < 001
Belize	Central America	Latin America and the Caribbean; North America	Americas	084 < 013 < 419 / 003 < 019 < 001
Costa Rica	Central America	Latin America and the Caribbean; North America	Americas	188 < 013 < 419 / 003 < 019 < 001
El Salvador	Central America	Latin America and the Caribbean; North America	Americas	222 < 013 < 419 / 003 < 019 < 001
Guatemala	Central America	Latin America and the Caribbean; North America	Americas	320 < 013 < 419 / 003 < 019 < 001
Honduras	Central America	Latin America and the Caribbean; North America	Americas	340 < 013 < 419 / 003 < 019 < 001
Mexico	Central America	Latin America and the Caribbean; North America	Americas	484 < 013 < 419 / 003 < 019 < 001
Nicaragua	Central America	Latin America and the Caribbean; North America	Americas	558 < 013 < 419 / 003 < 019 < 001
Panama	Central America	Latin America and the Caribbean; North America	Americas	591 < 013 < 419 / 003 < 019 < 001
Argentina	South America	Latin America and the Caribbean	Americas	032 < 005 < 419 < 019 < 001
Bolivia (Plurinational State of)	South America	Latin America and the Caribbean	Americas	068 < 005 < 419 < 019 < 001
Bouvet Island	South America	Latin America and the Caribbean	Americas	074 < 005 < 419 < 019 < 001
Brazil	South America	Latin America and the Caribbean	Americas	076 < 005 < 419 < 019 < 001
Chile	South America	Latin America and the Caribbean	Americas	152 < 005 < 419 < 019 < 001
Colombia	South America	Latin America and the Caribbean	Americas	170 < 005 < 419 < 019 < 001
Ecuador	South America	Latin America and the Caribbean	Americas	218 < 005 < 419 < 019 < 001
Falkland Islands (Malvinas)	South America	Latin America and the Caribbean	Americas	238 < 005 < 419 < 019 < 001
French Guiana	South America	Latin America and the Caribbean	Americas	254 < 005 < 419 < 019 < 001
Guyana	South America	Latin America and the Caribbean	Americas	328 < 005 < 419 < 019 < 001
Paraguay	South America	Latin America and the Caribbean	Americas	600 < 005 < 419 < 019 < 001
Peru	South America	Latin America and the Caribbean	Americas	604 < 005 < 419 < 019 < 001
South Georgia and the South Sandwich Islands	South America	Latin America and the Caribbean	Americas	239 < 005 < 419 < 019 < 001
Suriname	South America	Latin America and the Caribbean	Americas	740 < 005 < 419 < 019 < 001
Uruguay	South America	Latin America and the Caribbean	Americas	858 < 005 < 419 < 019 < 001
Venezuela (Bolivarian Republic of)	South America	Latin America and the Caribbean	Americas	862 < 005 < 419 < 019 < 001
Bermuda	Northern America	North America	Americas	060 < 021 < 003 < 019 < 001
Canada	Northern America	North America	Americas	124 < 021 < 003 < 019 < 001
Greenland	Northern America	North America	Americas	304 < 021 < 003 < 019 < 001
Saint Pierre and Miquelon	Northern America	North America	Americas	666 < 021 < 003 < 019 < 001
United States of America	Northern America	North America	Americas	840 < 021 < 003 < 019 < 001
(Antarctic Treaty) Antarctica	—	—	Antarctica	010 < 001
Kazakhstan	Central Asia	—	Asia	398 < 143 < 142 < 001
Kyrgyzstan	Central Asia	—	Asia	417 < 143 < 142 < 001
Tajikistan	Central Asia	—	Asia	762 < 143 < 142 < 001
Turkmenistan	Central Asia	—	Asia	795 < 143 < 142 < 001
Uzbekistan	Central Asia	—	Asia	860 < 143 < 142 < 001
China	Eastern Asia	—	Asia	156 < 030 < 142 < 001
China, Hong Kong Special Administrative Region	Eastern Asia	—	Asia	344 < 030 < 142 < 001
China, Macao Special Administrative Region	Eastern Asia	—	Asia	446 < 030 < 142 < 001
Democratic People's Republic of Korea [North Korea]	Eastern Asia	—	Asia	408 < 030 < 142 < 001
Japan	Eastern Asia	—	Asia	392 < 030 < 142 < 001
Mongolia	Eastern Asia	—	Asia	496 < 030 < 142 < 001
Republic of Korea [South Korea]	Eastern Asia	—	Asia	410 < 030 < 142 < 001
Brunei Darussalam	South-eastern Asia	—	Asia	096 < 035 < 142 < 001
Cambodia	South-eastern Asia	—	Asia	116 < 035 < 142 < 001
Indonesia	South-eastern Asia	—	Asia	360 < 035 < 142 < 001
Lao People's Democratic Republic	South-eastern Asia	—	Asia	418 < 035 < 142 < 001
Malaysia	South-eastern Asia	—	Asia	458 < 035 < 142 < 001
Myanmar [Burma]	South-eastern Asia	—	Asia	104 < 035 < 142 < 001
Philippines	South-eastern Asia	—	Asia	608 < 035 < 142 < 001
Singapore	South-eastern Asia	—	Asia	702 < 035 < 142 < 001
Thailand	South-eastern Asia	—	Asia	764 < 035 < 142 < 001
Timor-Leste [East Timor]	South-eastern Asia	—	Asia	626 < 035 < 142 < 001
Viet Nam	South-eastern Asia	—	Asia	704 < 035 < 142 < 001
Islamic Republic of Afghanistan	Southern Asia	—	Asia	004 < 034 < 142 < 001
Bangladesh	Southern Asia	—	Asia	050 < 034 < 142 < 001
Bhutan	Southern Asia	—	Asia	064 < 034 < 142 < 001
India	Southern Asia	—	Asia	356 < 034 < 142 < 001
Iran (Islamic Republic of)	Southern Asia	—	Asia	364 < 034 < 142 < 001
Maldives	Southern Asia	—	Asia	462 < 034 < 142 < 001
Nepal	Southern Asia	—	Asia	524 < 034 < 142 < 001
Pakistan	Southern Asia	—	Asia	586 < 034 < 142 < 001
Sri Lanka	Southern Asia	—	Asia	144 < 034 < 142 < 001
Armenia	Western Asia	—	Asia	051 < 145 < 142 < 001
Azerbaijan	Western Asia	—	Asia	031 < 145 < 142 < 001
Bahrain	Western Asia	—	Asia	048 < 145 < 142 < 001
Cyprus	Western Asia	—	Asia	196 < 145 < 142 < 001
Georgia	Western Asia	—	Asia	268 < 145 < 142 < 001
Iraq	Western Asia	—	Asia	368 < 145 < 142 < 001
Israel	Western Asia	—	Asia	376 < 145 < 142 < 001
Jordan	Western Asia	—	Asia	400 < 145 < 142 < 001
Kuwait	Western Asia	—	Asia	414 < 145 < 142 < 001
Lebanon	Western Asia	—	Asia	422 < 145 < 142 < 001
Oman	Western Asia	—	Asia	512 < 145 < 142 < 001
Qatar	Western Asia	—	Asia	634 < 145 < 142 < 001
Saudi Arabia	Western Asia	—	Asia	682 < 145 < 142 < 001
State of Palestine	Western Asia	—	Asia	275 < 145 < 142 < 001
Syrian Arab Republic	Western Asia	—	Asia	760 < 145 < 142 < 001
Türkiye	Western Asia	—	Asia	792 < 145 < 142 < 001
United Arab Emirates	Western Asia	—	Asia	784 < 145 < 142 < 001
Yemen	Western Asia	—	Asia	887 < 145 < 142 < 001
Belarus	Eastern Europe	—	Europe	112 < 151 < 150 < 001
Bulgaria	Eastern Europe	—	Europe	100 < 151 < 150 < 001
Czechia [Czech Republic]	Eastern Europe	—	Europe	203 < 151 < 150 < 001
Hungary	Eastern Europe	—	Europe	348 < 151 < 150 < 001
Poland	Eastern Europe	—	Europe	616 < 151 < 150 < 001
Republic of Moldova	Eastern Europe	—	Europe	498 < 151 < 150 < 001
Romania	Eastern Europe	—	Europe	642 < 151 < 150 < 001
Russian Federation	Eastern Europe	—	Europe	643 < 151 < 150 < 001
Slovakia	Eastern Europe	—	Europe	703 < 151 < 150 < 001
Ukraine	Eastern Europe	—	Europe	804 < 151 < 150 < 001
Åland Islands	Northern Europe	—	Europe	248 < 154 < 150 < 001
Denmark	Northern Europe	—	Europe	208 < 154 < 150 < 001
Estonia	Northern Europe	—	Europe	233 < 154 < 150 < 001
Faroe Islands	Northern Europe	—	Europe	234 < 154 < 150 < 001
Finland	Northern Europe	—	Europe	246 < 154 < 150 < 001
Guernsey	Northern Europe	—	Europe	831 < 154 < 150 < 001
Iceland	Northern Europe	—	Europe	352 < 154 < 150 < 001
Ireland	Northern Europe	—	Europe	372 < 154 < 150 < 001
Isle of Man	Northern Europe	—	Europe	833 < 154 < 150 < 001
Jersey	Northern Europe	—	Europe	832 < 154 < 150 < 001
Latvia	Northern Europe	—	Europe	428 < 154 < 150 < 001
Lithuania	Northern Europe	—	Europe	440 < 154 < 150 < 001
Norway	Northern Europe	—	Europe	578 < 154 < 150 < 001
Svalbard and Jan Mayen Islands	Northern Europe	—	Europe	744 < 154 < 150 < 001
Sweden	Northern Europe	—	Europe	752 < 154 < 150 < 001
United Kingdom of Great Britain and Northern Ireland	Northern Europe	—	Europe	826 < 154 < 150 < 001
Albania	Southern Europe	—	Europe	008 < 039 < 150 < 001
Andorra	Southern Europe	—	Europe	020 < 039 < 150 < 001
Bosnia and Herzegovina	Southern Europe	—	Europe	070 < 039 < 150 < 001
Croatia	Southern Europe	—	Europe	191 < 039 < 150 < 001
Gibraltar	Southern Europe	—	Europe	292 < 039 < 150 < 001
Greece	Southern Europe	—	Europe	300 < 039 < 150 < 001
Holy See [Vatican City]	Southern Europe	—	Europe	336 < 039 < 150 < 001
Italy	Southern Europe	—	Europe	380 < 039 < 150 < 001
Malta	Southern Europe	—	Europe	470 < 039 < 150 < 001
Montenegro	Southern Europe	—	Europe	499 < 039 < 150 < 001
North Macedonia	Southern Europe	—	Europe	807 < 039 < 150 < 001
Portugal	Southern Europe	—	Europe	620 < 039 < 150 < 001
San Marino	Southern Europe	—	Europe	674 < 039 < 150 < 001
Serbia	Southern Europe	—	Europe	688 < 039 < 150 < 001
Slovenia	Southern Europe	—	Europe	705 < 039 < 150 < 001
Spain	Southern Europe	—	Europe	724 < 039 < 150 < 001
Austria	Western Europe	—	Europe	040 < 155 < 150 < 001
Belgium	Western Europe	—	Europe	056 < 155 < 150 < 001
France [French Republic]	Western Europe	—	Europe	250 < 155 < 150 < 001
Germany	Western Europe	—	Europe	276 < 155 < 150 < 001
Liechtenstein	Western Europe	—	Europe	438 < 155 < 150 < 001
Luxembourg	Western Europe	—	Europe	442 < 155 < 150 < 001
Monaco	Western Europe	—	Europe	492 < 155 < 150 < 001
Netherlands	Western Europe	—	Europe	528 < 155 < 150 < 001
Switzerland	Western Europe	—	Europe	756 < 155 < 150 < 001
Australia	Australia and New Zealand	—	Oceania	036 < 053 < 009 < 001
Christmas Island	Australia and New Zealand	—	Oceania	162 < 053 < 009 < 001
Cocos (Keeling) Islands	Australia and New Zealand	—	Oceania	166 < 053 < 009 < 001
Heard Island and McDonald Islands	Australia and New Zealand	—	Oceania	334 < 053 < 009 < 001
New Zealand	Australia and New Zealand	—	Oceania	554 < 053 < 009 < 001
Norfolk Island	Australia and New Zealand	—	Oceania	574 < 053 < 009 < 001
Fiji	Melanesia	—	Oceania	242 < 054 < 009 < 001
New Caledonia	Melanesia	—	Oceania	540 < 054 < 009 < 001
Papua New Guinea	Melanesia	—	Oceania	598 < 054 < 009 < 001
Solomon Islands	Melanesia	—	Oceania	090 < 054 < 009 < 001
Vanuatu	Melanesia	—	Oceania	548 < 054 < 009 < 001
Guam	Micronesia	—	Oceania	316 < 057 < 009 < 001
Kiribati	Micronesia	—	Oceania	296 < 057 < 009 < 001
Marshall Islands	Micronesia	—	Oceania	584 < 057 < 009 < 001
Micronesia (Federated States of)	Micronesia	—	Oceania	583 < 057 < 009 < 001
Nauru	Micronesia	—	Oceania	520 < 057 < 009 < 001
Northern Mariana Islands	Micronesia	—	Oceania	580 < 057 < 009 < 001
Palau	Micronesia	—	Oceania	585 < 057 < 009 < 001
United States Minor Outlying Islands	Micronesia	—	Oceania	581 < 057 < 009 < 001
American Samoa	Polynesia	—	Oceania	016 < 061 < 009 < 001
Cook Islands	Polynesia	—	Oceania	184 < 061 < 009 < 001
French Polynesia	Polynesia	—	Oceania	258 < 061 < 009 < 001
Niue	Polynesia	—	Oceania	570 < 061 < 009 < 001
Pitcairn [Pitcairn Islands]	Polynesia	—	Oceania	612 < 061 < 009 < 001
Samoa	Polynesia	—	Oceania	882 < 061 < 009 < 001
Tokelau	Polynesia	—	Oceania	772 < 061 < 009 < 001
Tonga	Polynesia	—	Oceania	776 < 061 < 009 < 001
Tuvalu	Polynesia	—	Oceania	798 < 061 < 009 < 001
Wallis and Futuna Islands	Polynesia	—	Oceania	876 < 061 < 009 < 001

=== Entries for strictly statistical purposes ===
Country or Area	Geographical subregion	Intermediary region	Continental region	UNSD M49 Codes
Taiwan Province of China [Taiwan] (Note: The national flag of the Republic of China (Taiwan) is not permitted to be used in all institutions within the United Nations System.)	Eastern Asia	—	Asia	158 < 030 < 142 < 001
Kosovo	Southern Europe	—	Europe	412 < 039 < 150 < 001

=== Former entries ===
Country or Area	Geographical subregion	Intermediary region	Continental region	UNSD M49 Codes
Channel Islands	Northern Europe	—	Europe	830 < 154 < 150 < 001
Sark	Northern Europe	—	Europe	680 < 154 < 150 < 001

== See also ==
- Lists of sovereign states and dependent territories
  - Country
    - List of associated states
    - List of de facto states
    - List of sovereign states
  - Territory
    - List of dependent territories
    - List of disputed territories
    - List of overseas territories
    - United Nations list of non-self-governing territories
- Timeline of geopolitical changes
  - Timeline of geopolitical changes (before 1500)
  - Timeline of geopolitical changes (1500–1899)
  - Timeline of geopolitical changes (1900–1999)
  - Timeline of geopolitical changes (2000–present)
- United Nations Statistics Division
  - United Nations geoscheme
  - UNSD M49 Codes
