= List of world regions by life expectancy =

World regions by life expectancy

This is a list of world regions by life expectancy.

== United Nations (2023) ==
Estimation of the analytical agency of the UN.

=== UN: Estimate of life expectancy for various ages in 2023 ===
UN subregions	Life expectancy for population in general							Life expectancy for male				Life expectancy for female				Sex gap				Population (thous.)
UN subregions	at birth	bonus 0→15	at 15	bonus 15→65	at 65	bonus 65→80	at 80	at birth	at 15	at 65	at 80	at birth	at 15	at 65	at 80	at birth	at 15	at 65	at 80	Population (thous.)
Australia/New Zealand	83.62	0.38	69.00	2.51	21.51	3.40	9.91	81.82	67.21	20.22	9.10	85.42	70.78	22.75	10.61	3.59	3.58	2.53	1.51	31624
Southern Europe	82.56	0.33	67.89	2.74	20.64	3.99	9.62	80.05	65.40	18.82	8.58	84.97	70.28	22.25	10.37	4.92	4.88	3.43	1.79	151721
Western Europe	82.20	0.36	67.57	3.07	20.64	3.94	9.58	79.77	65.16	18.91	8.62	84.60	69.93	22.18	10.28	4.83	4.78	3.27	1.66	199537
Northern Europe	81.40	0.36	66.76	3.37	20.13	4.13	9.26	79.29	64.67	18.75	8.46	83.48	68.81	21.39	9.87	4.19	4.13	2.64	1.41	108297
Northern America	79.64	0.56	65.21	4.96	20.16	4.53	9.69	77.22	62.82	18.82	8.92	82.16	67.68	21.39	10.27	4.94	4.86	2.57	1.35	382903
Eastern Asia	78.89	0.73	64.61	3.72	18.33	4.98	8.31	76.01	61.78	16.29	7.08	81.95	67.63	20.33	9.29	5.94	5.85	4.04	2.21	1660029
Polynesia	77.20	1.11	63.31	4.68	18.00	5.43	8.43	74.93	61.09	16.47	7.59	79.61	65.67	19.50	9.06	4.68	4.58	3.03	1.47	690
South America	76.21	1.30	62.51	5.58	18.09	5.10	8.19	73.26	59.64	16.59	7.38	79.18	65.39	19.40	8.76	5.92	5.75	2.81	1.37	433024
Western Asia	75.41	1.97	62.37	4.58	16.95	5.57	7.52	73.02	60.08	15.35	6.52	77.89	64.75	18.39	8.24	4.87	4.67	3.04	1.72	303965
Central America	74.96	1.22	61.18	6.42	17.60	5.58	8.18	72.17	58.46	16.80	8.09	77.68	63.82	18.29	8.26	5.51	5.36	1.49	0.17	181618
Eastern Europe	74.61	0.45	60.06	7.36	17.42	6.15	8.57	69.43	54.89	14.90	7.58	79.81	65.23	19.17	9.01	10.38	10.34	4.27	1.43	286047
World	73.17	3.29	61.46	6.11	17.57	5.75	8.31	70.55	58.91	16.01	7.43	75.89	64.09	18.98	8.96	5.34	5.18	2.97	1.53	8091735
Caribbean	73.13	2.95	61.08	6.42	17.50	6.22	8.72	69.94	58.08	15.87	7.83	76.41	64.13	18.97	9.38	6.46	6.05	3.10	1.55	44249
Central Asia	72.65	1.48	59.13	6.00	15.13	6.38	6.51	69.30	55.87	13.17	5.68	75.91	62.26	16.63	6.92	6.61	6.39	3.45	1.24	80810
South-Eastern Asia	72.14	1.99	59.13	6.69	15.82	6.61	7.43	69.18	56.32	14.25	6.68	75.15	61.96	17.16	7.89	5.97	5.64	2.91	1.21	690117
Northern Africa	71.99	2.44	59.43	5.36	14.79	6.58	6.36	69.81	57.41	13.66	5.87	74.28	61.54	15.86	6.74	4.48	4.13	2.20	0.87	268541
Southern Asia	71.70	2.79	59.49	6.06	15.54	6.86	7.40	70.04	57.87	14.79	7.10	73.47	61.22	16.27	7.64	3.43	3.35	1.48	0.54	2043083
Micronesia	71.46	2.56	59.01	7.87	16.88	6.84	8.71	68.64	56.32	15.35	7.91	74.42	61.82	18.26	9.26	5.79	5.50	2.92	1.35	525
Melanesia	66.92	2.98	54.91	8.23	13.14	7.69	5.83	64.58	52.69	12.02	5.36	69.72	57.57	14.46	6.28	5.14	4.88	2.44	0.92	12724
Southern Africa	65.95	3.01	53.96	10.94	14.90	7.63	7.53	62.47	50.55	13.11	6.59	69.36	57.26	16.22	8.01	6.89	6.70	3.12	1.41	72198
Eastern Africa	65.59	4.18	54.77	9.52	14.29	7.34	6.62	62.85	52.29	13.17	5.93	68.32	57.20	15.21	7.10	5.47	4.91	2.05	1.17	487857
Middle Africa	62.02	6.21	53.23	10.15	13.38	7.46	5.84	59.87	51.39	12.69	5.53	64.21	55.07	14.00	6.07	4.34	3.68	1.32	0.54	206130
Western Africa	58.25	7.68	50.93	11.70	12.62	7.76	5.38	57.35	50.12	12.26	5.18	59.17	51.74	12.96	5.55	1.82	1.63	0.70	0.36	446044

=== UN: Change of life expectancy from 2019 to 2023 ===
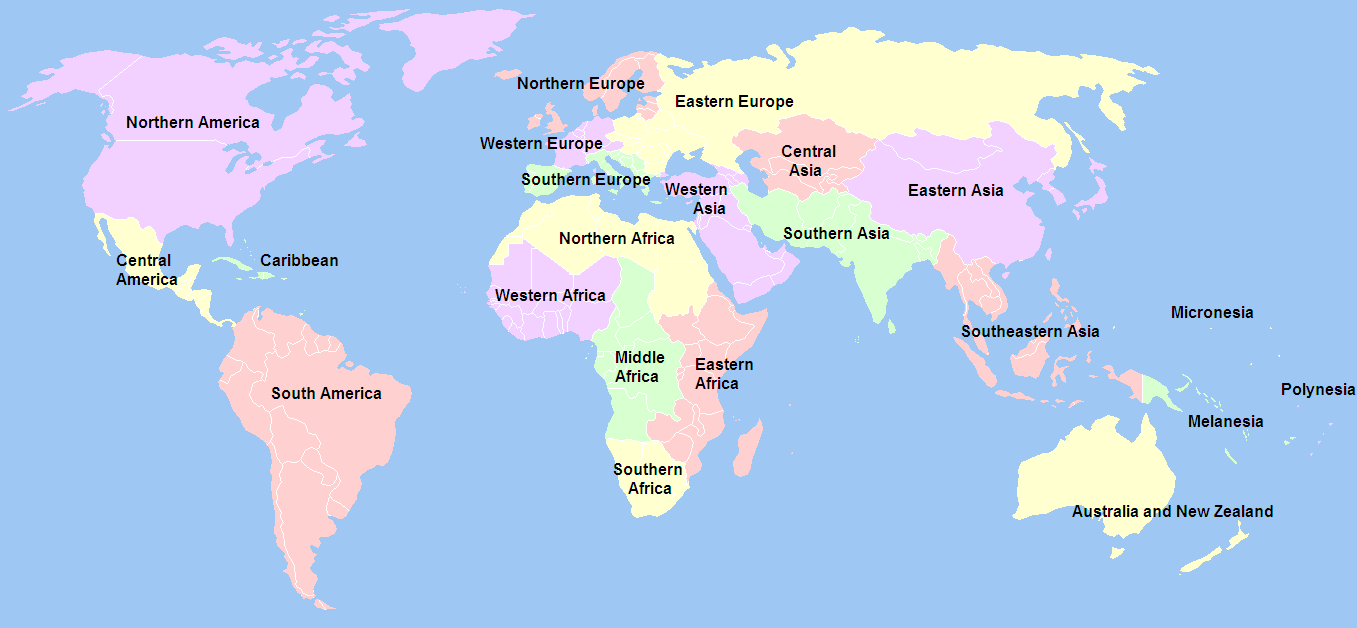

UN subregions	2023				Historical data									Recovery from COVID-19: 2019→2023	Population (thous.)
UN subregions	All	Male	Female	Sex gap	2019	2019 →2020	2020	2020 →2021	2021	2021 →2022	2022	2022 →2023	2023	Recovery from COVID-19: 2019→2023	Population (thous.)
Australia/New Zealand	83.62	81.82	85.42	3.59	83.01	0.49	83.50	−0.14	83.36	−0.87	82.48	1.14	83.62	0.62	31624
Southern Europe	82.56	80.05	84.97	4.92	82.16	−1.10	81.06	0.16	81.23	−0.09	81.14	1.43	82.56	0.40	151721
Western Europe	82.20	79.77	84.60	4.83	81.92	−0.40	81.52	0.14	81.67	−0.24	81.43	0.77	82.20	0.29	199537
Northern Europe	81.40	79.29	83.48	4.19	81.40	−0.77	80.64	0.12	80.76	0.25	81.01	0.39	81.40	0.00	108297
Northern America	79.64	77.22	82.16	4.94	79.25	−1.79	77.46	−0.54	76.92	1.39	78.31	1.33	79.64	0.39	382903
Eastern Asia	78.89	76.01	81.95	5.94	78.85	0.09	78.94	0.07	79.01	−0.02	78.99	−0.10	78.89	0.03	1660029
Polynesia	77.20	74.93	79.61	4.68	76.05	−0.04	76.02	−1.00	75.02	1.93	76.95	0.26	77.20	1.15	690
South America	76.21	73.26	79.18	5.92	75.86	−1.58	74.28	−1.58	72.70	2.43	75.13	1.08	76.21	0.35	433024
Western Asia	75.41	73.02	77.89	4.87	75.06	−1.13	73.94	−0.42	73.52	1.75	75.26	0.14	75.41	0.34	303965
Central America	74.96	72.17	77.68	5.51	74.32	−3.51	70.81	−0.81	70.01	3.94	73.95	1.01	74.96	0.64	181618
Eastern Europe	74.61	69.43	79.81	10.38	74.39	−1.48	72.91	−1.35	71.56	2.33	73.89	0.72	74.61	0.22	286047
World	73.17	70.55	75.89	5.34	72.61	−0.69	71.92	−1.05	70.86	1.77	72.64	0.53	73.17	0.56	8091735
Caribbean	73.13	69.94	76.41	6.46	72.61	−0.34	72.26	−2.30	69.96	2.68	72.64	0.49	73.13	0.53	44249
Central Asia	72.65	69.30	75.91	6.61	72.05	−1.44	70.62	−0.11	70.51	1.73	72.24	0.41	72.65	0.60	80810
South-Eastern Asia	72.14	69.18	75.15	5.97	71.63	−0.52	71.11	−1.51	69.61	2.14	71.75	0.39	72.14	0.51	690117
Northern Africa	71.99	69.81	74.28	4.48	71.54	−1.39	70.15	−0.33	69.82	1.88	71.69	0.29	71.99	0.45	268541
Southern Asia	71.70	70.04	73.47	3.43	70.44	−0.78	69.66	−2.25	67.41	3.96	71.37	0.33	71.70	1.26	2043083
Micronesia	71.46	68.64	74.42	5.79	70.67	−0.69	69.98	−0.20	69.78	1.46	71.24	0.22	71.46	0.79	525
Melanesia	66.92	64.58	69.72	5.14	66.15	−0.27	65.89	−0.84	65.05	1.13	66.17	0.75	66.92	0.77	12724
Southern Africa	65.95	62.47	69.36	6.89	65.53	−0.82	64.71	−3.03	61.68	3.52	65.20	0.75	65.95	0.42	72198
Eastern Africa	65.59	62.85	68.32	5.47	64.17	−0.02	64.15	−0.60	63.55	1.35	64.90	0.69	65.59	1.42	487857
Middle Africa	62.02	59.87	64.21	4.34	59.15	1.10	60.25	−0.71	59.54	−0.75	58.79	3.23	62.02	2.87	206130
Western Africa	58.25	57.35	59.17	1.82	56.86	0.01	56.87	0.19	57.06	0.78	57.84	0.41	58.25	1.39	446044

== List by the World Bank Group (2024) ==
Estimation of the World Bank Group for 2024. The values in the World Bank Group tables are rounded. All calculations are based on raw data, so due to the nuances of rounding, in some places illusory inconsistencies of indicators arose, with a size of 0.01 year.

World Bank Group (2024)
Countries and territories	2024				Historical data													recovery from COVID-19: 2019→2024
Countries and territories	All	Male	Female	Sex gap	2014	2014 →2019	2019	2019 →2020	2020	2020 →2021	2021	2021 →2022	2022	2022 →2023	2023	2023 →2024	2024	recovery from COVID-19: 2019→2024
European Union	81.56	79.04	84.22	5.18	80.88	0.44	81.32	−0.88	80.44	−0.13	80.31	0.41	80.71	0.71	81.42	0.14	81.56	0.24
North America	79.24	76.88	81.72	4.84	79.14	0.00	79.13	−1.68	77.45	−0.59	76.86	0.96	77.82	0.91	78.73	0.51	79.24	0.11
Europe & Central Asia	78.60	75.57	81.79	6.22	77.35	0.95	78.30	−1.13	77.18	−0.45	76.73	1.11	77.83	0.56	78.39	0.21	78.60	0.29
Central Europe & the Baltics	77.92	74.48	81.54	7.06	76.69	0.58	77.27	−1.25	76.02	−1.29	74.72	1.93	76.65	1.11	77.76	0.16	77.92	0.65
East Asia & Pacific	76.74	73.92	79.70	5.78	75.56	1.02	76.59	−0.04	76.54	−0.39	76.15	0.52	76.68	−0.02	76.66	0.08	76.74	0.15
Latin America & Caribbean	75.82	72.95	78.69	5.74	74.56	0.64	75.20	−2.02	73.19	−1.37	71.81	2.83	74.65	1.00	75.64	0.17	75.82	0.61
World	73.48	71.11	75.97	4.86	71.78	1.09	72.87	−0.69	72.18	−0.97	71.21	1.75	72.97	0.36	73.33	0.15	73.48	0.61
Arab world	72.72	70.90	74.70	3.80	70.54	1.30	71.84	−1.11	70.73	−0.32	70.40	1.47	71.88	0.57	72.44	0.28	72.72	0.88
South Asia	72.56	71.01	74.22	3.22	69.12	1.88	71.00	−0.64	70.36	−2.54	67.82	4.19	72.01	0.31	72.32	0.24	72.56	1.56
Middle East & North Africa	72.31	70.42	74.34	3.92	69.99	1.25	71.24	−1.33	69.91	−0.20	69.71	1.98	71.69	0.39	72.08	0.23	72.31	1.07
Africa Eastern & Southern	65.35	62.59	68.13	5.54	61.25	2.61	63.86	−0.09	63.77	−0.79	62.98	1.51	64.49	0.66	65.15	0.20	65.35	1.49
Sub-Saharan Africa	62.80	60.68	64.96	4.28	58.99	2.14	61.13	0.04	61.17	−0.46	60.70	1.15	61.86	0.75	62.60	0.20	62.80	1.67
Africa Western & Central	59.05	57.92	60.21	2.29	55.70	1.45	57.15	0.21	57.36	0.00	57.36	0.63	57.99	0.87	58.86	0.19	59.05	1.90

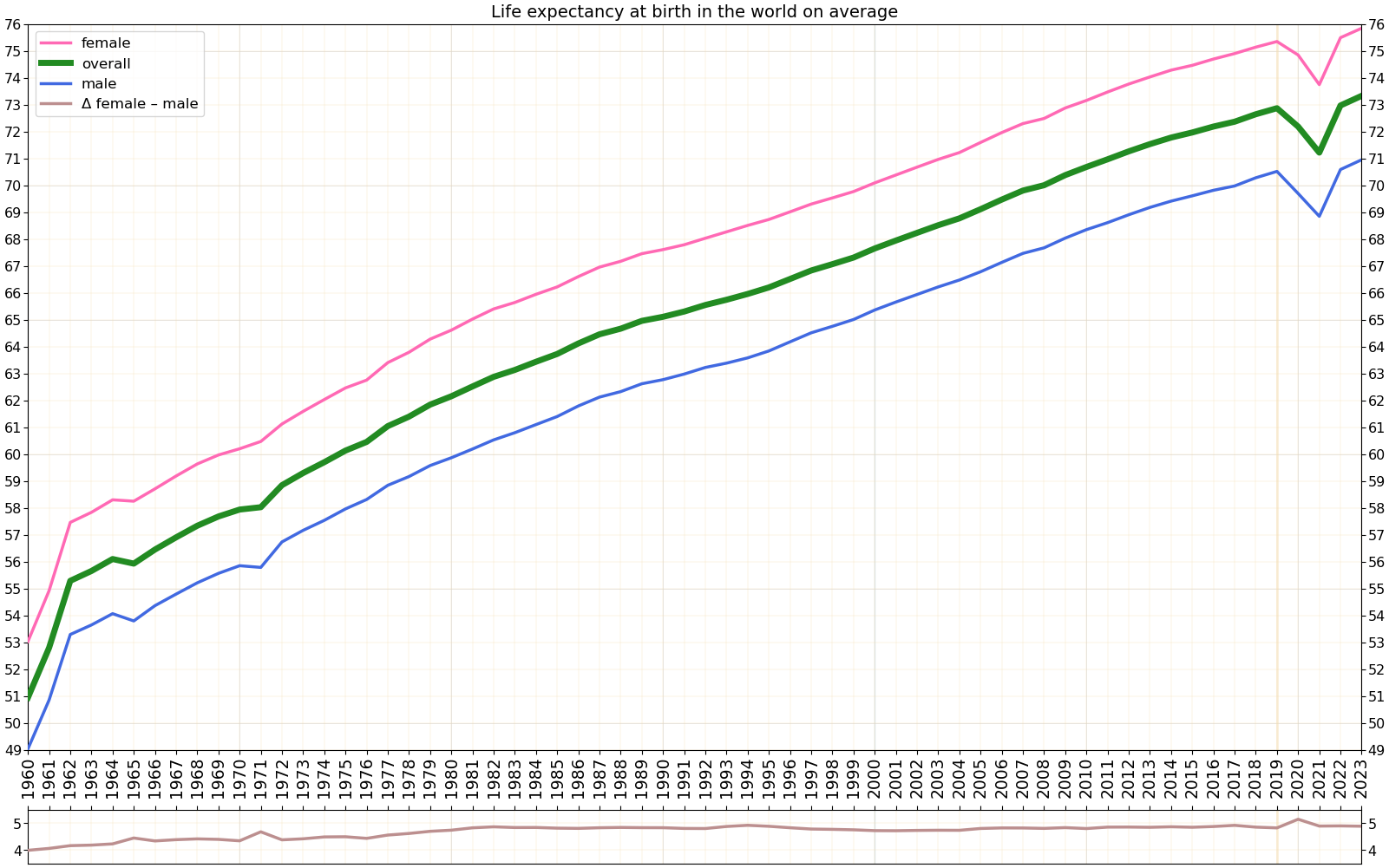
Life expectancy in the world on average

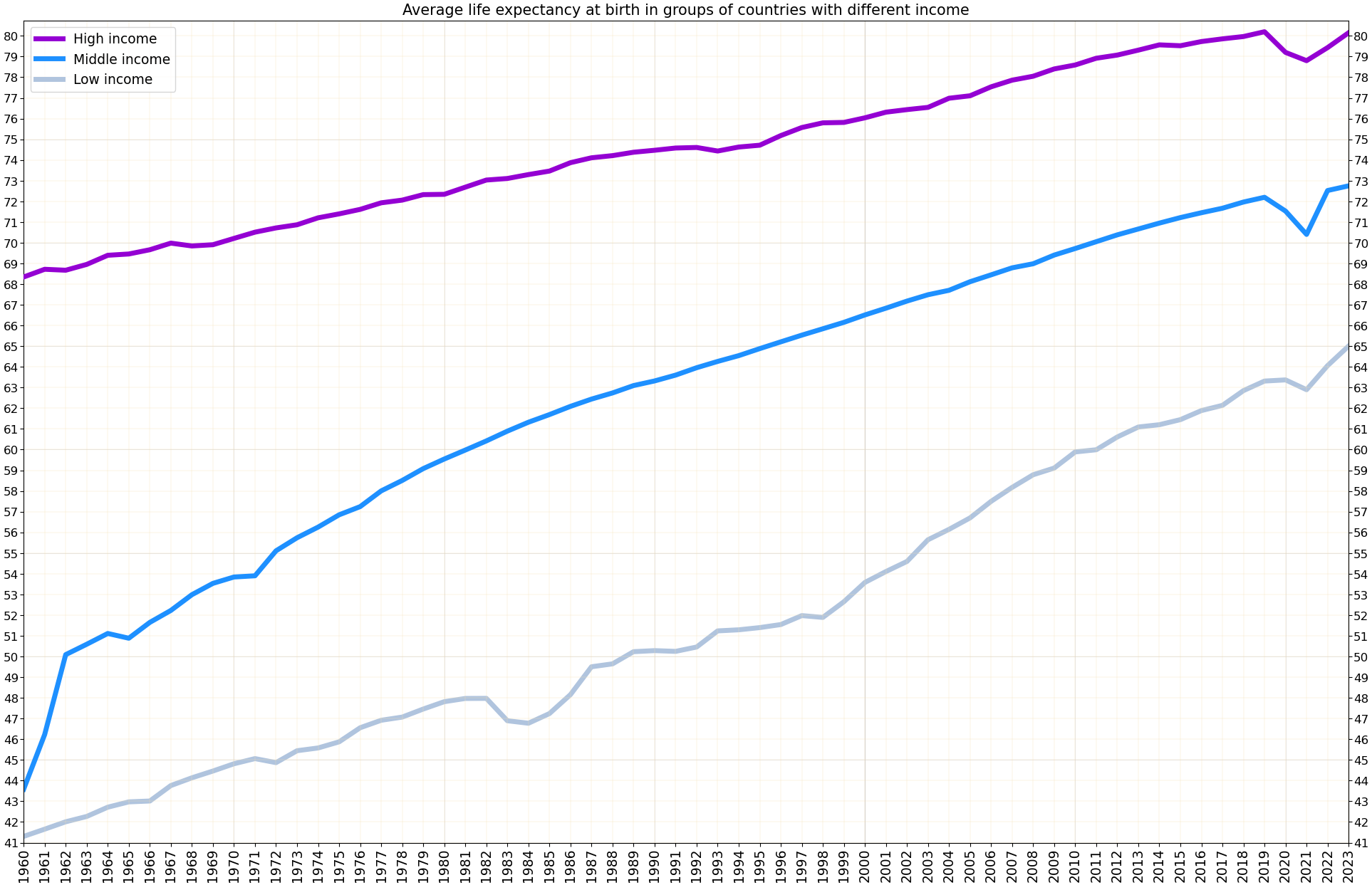
Comparison of life expectancy in countries with different income

== List by World Health Organization (2019) ==
Data by the WHO regions for 2019:

World Health Organization (2019) for the WHO regions
WHO regions	Life expectancy at birth					HALE at birth					Life expectancy at age 60					HALE at age 60				
WHO regions	All	M	F	FΔM	Δ 2000	All	M	F	FΔM	Δ 2000	All	M	F	FΔM	Δ 2000	All	M	F	FΔM	Δ 2000
Europe	78.10	74.99	81.13	6.14	5.70	67.58	66.07	69.04	2.97	4.69	22.47	20.48	24.18	3.70	2.91	16.92	15.69	17.98	2.29	2.11
Western Pacific	77.49	74.51	80.70	6.19	5.53	68.35	66.70	70.13	3.43	4.53	21.75	19.68	23.84	4.16	2.73	16.64	15.38	17.90	2.52	1.90
Americas	77.07	74.42	79.76	5.34	2.98	65.76	64.51	67.01	2.50	2.19	22.64	21.23	23.92	2.69	1.62	16.61	15.74	17.40	1.66	0.96
World	73.12	70.61	75.70	5.09	6.35	63.45	62.33	64.59	2.26	5.33	21.03	19.41	22.54	3.13	2.16	15.80	14.87	16.67	1.80	1.52
South-East Asia	71.37	69.61	73.23	3.62	7.30	61.82	61.38	62.28	0.90	6.48	18.90	17.88	19.89	2.01	1.37	14.03	13.58	14.46	0.88	1.10
Eastern Mediterranean	70.18	68.70	71.75	3.05	4.73	60.52	60.34	60.69	0.35	3.84	18.88	18.24	19.48	1.24	1.27	14.06	13.85	14.26	0.41	0.78
Africa	64.17	62.26	66.08	3.82	11.19	55.81	55.14	56.49	1.35	9.83	17.57	16.58	18.44	1.86	2.22	13.29	12.79	13.73	0.94	1.71

Data by groups of countries with different income according to grouping of the World Bank Group, for 2019:

World Health Organization (2019) for the income groups
Income groups	Life expectancy at birth					HALE at birth					Life expectancy at age 60					HALE at age 60				
Income groups	All	M	F	FΔM	Δ 2000	All	M	F	FΔM	Δ 2000	All	M	F	FΔM	Δ 2000	All	M	F	FΔM	Δ 2000
High-income	80.91	78.48	83.33	4.85	3.38	69.28	68.28	70.26	1.98	2.32	24.28	22.55	25.87	3.32	2.45	18.09	17.02	19.07	2.05	1.63
Upper-middle-income	75.67	72.73	78.72	5.99	5.87	66.42	64.88	68.01	3.13	4.87	20.80	18.93	22.57	3.64	2.71	15.82	14.71	16.87	2.16	1.92
World	73.12	70.61	75.70	5.09	6.35	63.45	62.33	64.59	2.26	5.33	21.03	19.41	22.54	3.13	2.16	15.80	14.87	16.67	1.80	1.52
Lower-middle-income	69.57	67.70	71.53	3.83	6.97	60.22	59.70	60.77	1.07	6.14	18.69	17.61	19.73	2.12	1.42	13.91	13.41	14.39	0.98	1.10
Low-income	64.22	62.10	66.34	4.24	10.61	55.89	54.98	56.81	1.83	9.29	17.16	16.14	18.06	1.92	2.40	13.04	12.47	13.53	1.06	1.84

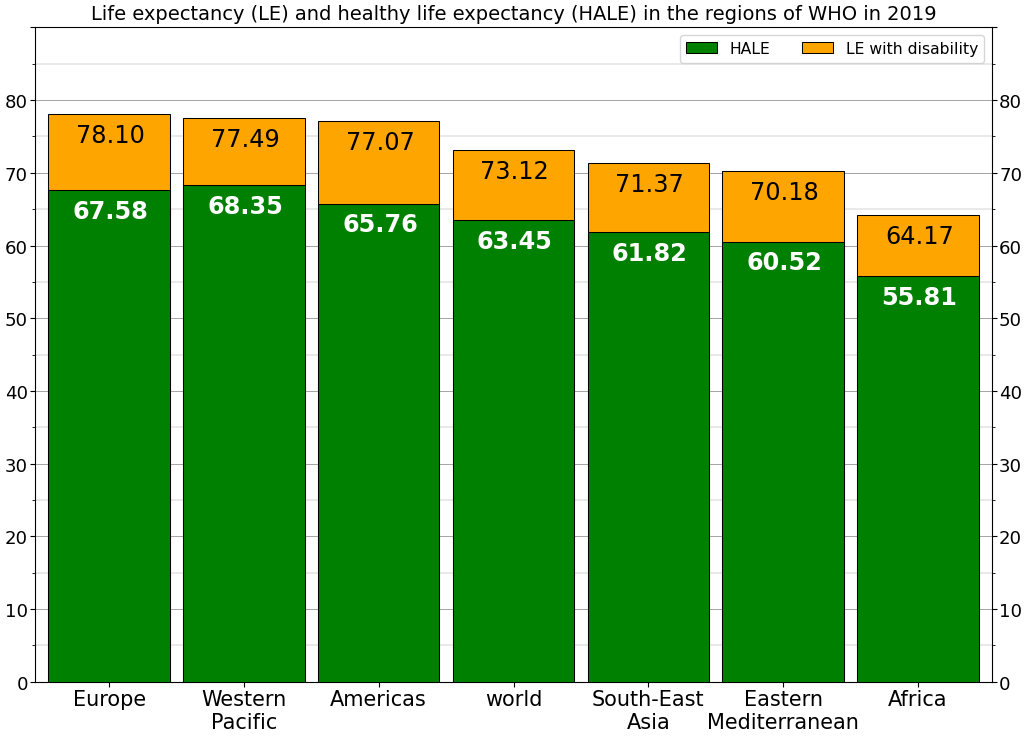
Life expectancy and HALE in regions of WHO in 2019

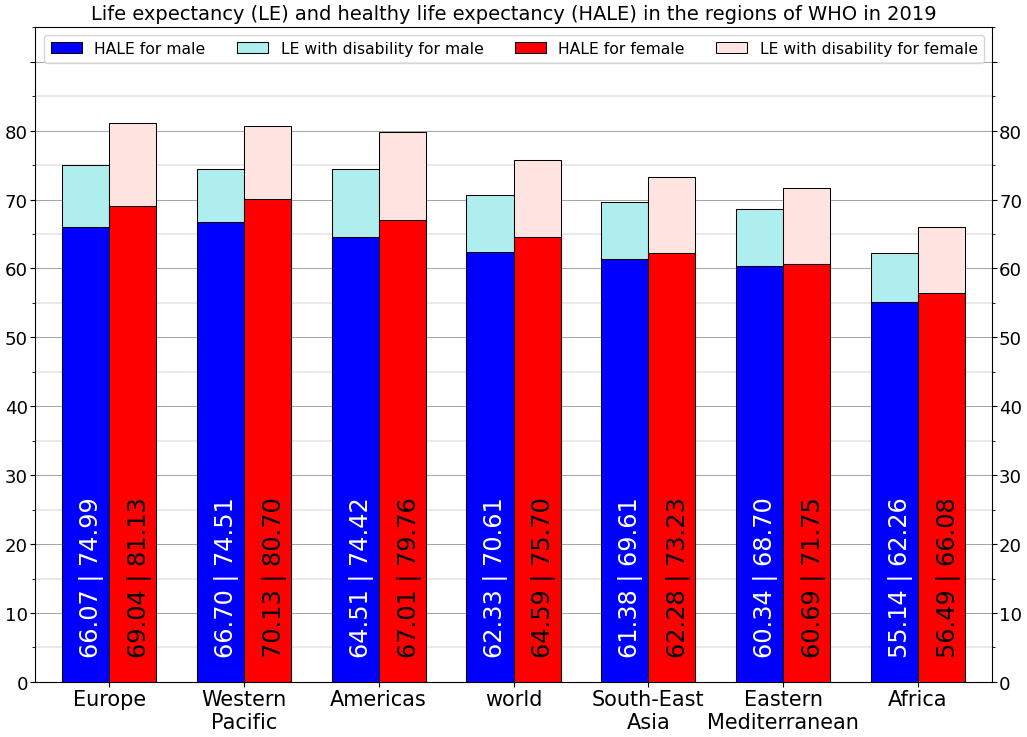
Elaboration by sex

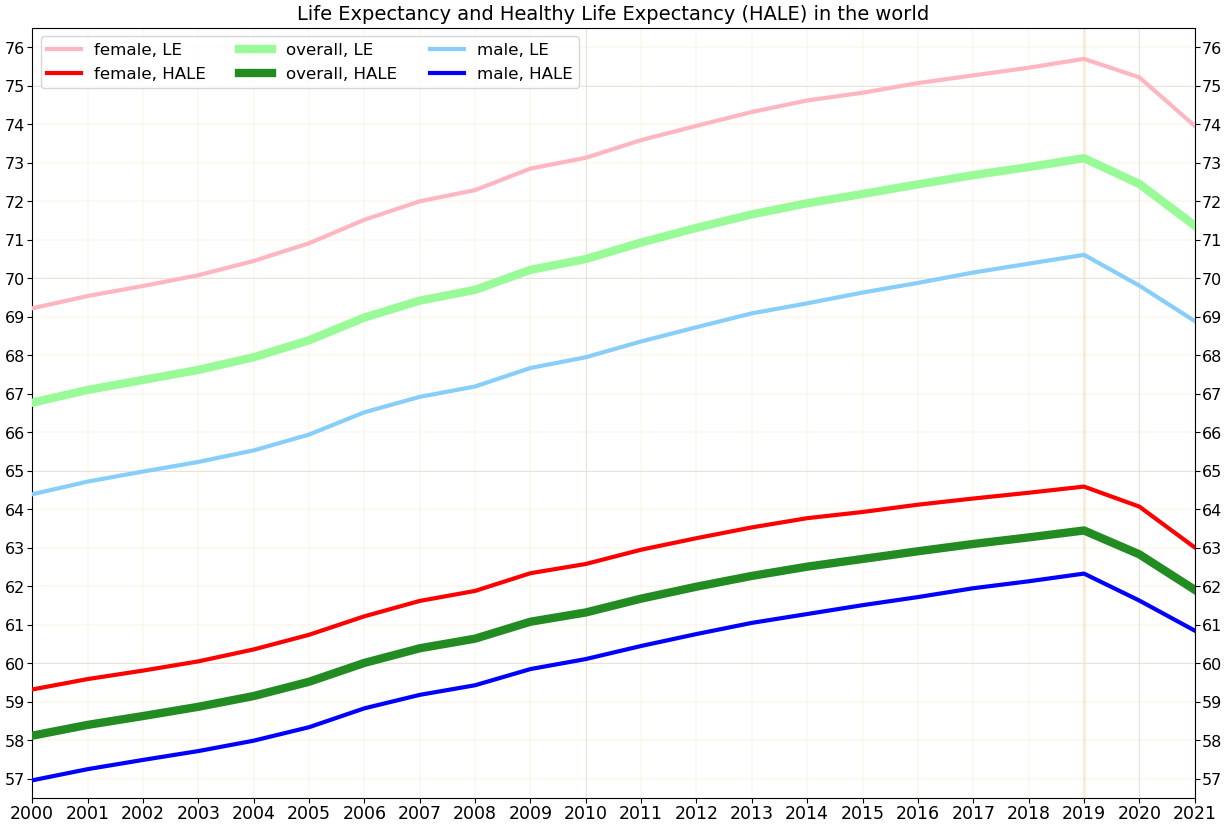
Life expectancy and HALE in the world on average

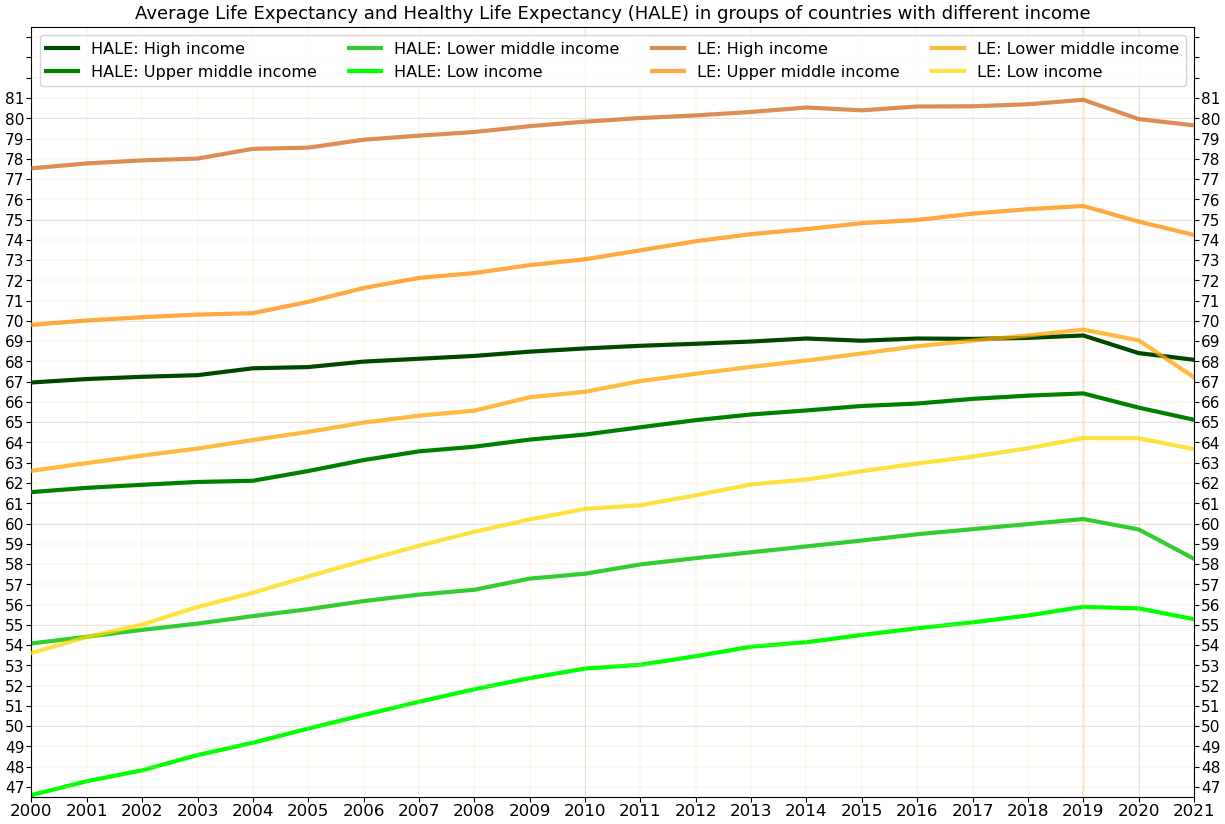
Comparison of life expectancy and HALE in countries with different income

== See also ==
- List of countries by life expectancy
