= UN M49 =

Standard for area codes used by the United Nations

UN M49 or the Standard Country or Area Codes for Statistical Use (Series M, No. 49) is a standard for area codes used by the United Nations for statistical purposes, developed and maintained by the United Nations Statistics Division. Each area code is a 3-digit number which can refer to a wide variety of geographical and political regions, like a continent and a country. Codes assigned in the system generally do not change when the country or area's name changes (unlike ISO 3166-1 alpha-2 or ISO 3166-1 alpha-3), but instead change when the territorial extent of the country or area changes significantly, although there have been exceptions to this rule. (Note: Through the second revision of M.49 in 1983, changes in territory did not necessarily result in changed codes. Pakistan, for example, retains the code it was assigned in the original 1970 edition of M.49, even though Bangladesh did not separate from Pakistan until 1971 and did not officially receive a code until the first revision of M.49 was released in 1975.)

Some of these codes, those representing countries and territories, were first included as part of the ISO 3166-1 standard in its second edition in 1981, but they have been released by the United Nations Statistics Division since 1970.

Another part of these numeric codes, those representing geographical (continental and sub-continental) supranational regions, was also included in the IANA registry for region subtags (first described in September 2006 in the now obsoleted RFC 4646, but confirmed in its successor RFC 5646, published in September 2009) for use within language tags, as specified in IETF's BCP 47 (where the ISO 3166-1 alpha-2 codes are used as region subtags, instead of UN M.49 codes, for countries and territories).

== Code lists ==
M.49 area codes (as of December 2021)

- 001 World (248 entries)
  - 019 Americas (57)
    - 021 Northern America (5): 060, 124, 304, 666, 840
    - 419 Latin America and the Caribbean (52)
      - 013 Central America (8): 084, 188, 222, 320, 340, 484, 558, 591
      - 029 Caribbean (28): 028, 044, 052, 092, 136, 192, 212, 214, 308, 312, 332, 388, 474, 500, 531, 533, 534, 535, 630, 652, 659, 660, 662, 663, 670, 780, 796, 850
      - 005 South America (16): 032, 068, 074, 076, 152, 170, 218, 238, 239, 254, 328, 600, 604, 740, 858, 862
  - 150 Europe (51)
    - 154 Northern Europe (16): 208, 233, 234, 246, 248, 352, 372, 428, 440, 578, 744, 752, 826, 831, 832, 833
    - 155 Western Europe (9): 040, 056, 250, 276, 438, 442, 492, 528, 756
    - 151 Eastern Europe (10): 100, 112, 203, 348, 498, 616, 642, 643, 703, 804
    - 039 Southern Europe (16): 008, 020, 070, 191, 292, 300, 336, 380, 470, 499, 620, 674, 688, 705, 724, 807
  - 142 Asia (50)
    - 145 Western Asia (18): 031, 051, 048, 196, 268, 275, 368, 376, 400, 414, 422, 512, 634, 682, 760, 792, 784, 887
    - 143 Central Asia (5): 398, 417, 762, 795, 860
    - 030 Eastern Asia (7): 156, 344, 392, 408, 410, 446, 496
    - 034 Southern Asia (9): 004, 050, 064, 144, 356, 364, 462, 524, 586
    - 035 South-eastern Asia (11): 096, 104, 116, 360, 418, 458, 608, 626, 702, 704, 764
  - 002 Africa (60)
      - 015 Northern Africa (7): 012, 434, 504, 729, 732, 788, 818
    - 202 Sub-Saharan Africa (53)
      - 011 Western Africa (17): 132, 204, 270, 288, 324, 384, 430, 466, 478, 562, 566, 624, 654, 686, 694, 768, 854
      - 017 Middle Africa (9): 024, 120, 140, 148, 178, 180, 226, 266, 678
      - 014 Eastern Africa (22): 086, 108, 174, 175, 231, 232, 260, 262, 404, 450, 454, 480, 508, 638, 646, 690, 706, 716, 728, 800, 834, 894
      - 018 Southern Africa (5) 072, 426, 516, 710, 748
  - 009 Oceania (29)
    - 054 Melanesia (5): 090, 242, 540, 548, 598
    - 053 Australia and New Zealand (6): 036, 162, 166, 334, 554, 574
    - 057 Micronesia (8): 296, 316, 520, 580, 581, 583, 584, 585
    - 061 Polynesia (10): 016, 184, 258, 570, 612, 772, 776, 798, 876, 882
  - 010 Antarctica (1): 010

For the Americas, an alternative division into North and South (instead of Northern and Latin) America remains possible:

- 001 World (248 entries)
  - 019 Americas (57)
    - 003 North America (41)
      - 021 Northern America (5)
      - 013 Central America (8)
      - 029 Caribbean (28)
    - 005 South America (16)

Other groupings
Code	Area
432	Landlocked developing countries (LLDCs)
722	Small Island Developing States (SIDS)
199	Least developed countries (LDCs)

Examples of geopolitical entities (countries or territories) (See also ISO 3166-1 numeric for the complete set)
Code	Area
024	Angola
591	Panama
496	Mongolia
554	New Zealand
756	Switzerland
830	Channel Islands (Note: The Channel Islands have never been a single political entity, but a code has been maintained, for statistical use only, in the UN M.49 codification (this grouping has never been encoded in ISO 3166-1, unlike other geopolitical countries or territories), in addition to the newer separate codifications of the Bailiwicks of Jersey and of Guernsey (which were also encoded separately in ISO 3166-1).)

== Private-use codes and reserved codes ==
Beside the codes standardized above, the numeric codes 900 to 999 are reserved for private-use in ISO 3166-1 (under agreement by the UNSD) and in the UN M.49 standard. They may be used for any other groupings or subdivision of countries, territories and regions.

Some of these private-use codes may be found in some UN statistics reports and databases, for their own specific purpose. They are not portable across databases from third parties (except through private agreement), and may be changed without notice.

Note that the code 000 is reserved and not used for defining any region. It is used in absence of data, or for data in which no region (not even the World as a whole) is applicable. For unknown or unencoded regions, private-use codes should preferably be used. For example, the Unicode Common Locale Data Repository uses 961 for its grouping Outlying Oceania.

== Extensions to M.49 ==
Early editions of M.49 used one- or two-digit affixes to designate economic regions rather than assigning 3-digit codes to them.

The two-digit prefixes were designed to be used to easily aggregate data through the use of prefix matching, and regions could be specified collectively by using the 000 code as a base to which the prefix would be added. For example, by prefixing 13 to Algeria's code, 012, to create the five-digit code 13 012, Algeria could be identified as being in North Africa (13 000), which is itself in Africa (10 000).

One-digit suffixes were also permitted, to specify statistics of subdivisions of countries. For example, by suffixing 5 to the code for the United Kingdom 826 to create the four-digit code 826 5, Scotland could be represented as a subdivision of the United Kingdom.

== Developed and developing regions ==
The United Nations Statistics Division classifies economic regions into developed and developing regions for statistical convenience. Although this classification was removed from M49 in December 2021, it is still used by the UNSD and various United Nations reports.

Examples of economic regions (defined for statistical use only)
Code	Area
	Developed regions
021	Northern America
150	Europe (Note: Within the developed regions, Europe is sometimes defined with the exception of Transition countries, numerical code 778.)
392	Japan
410	Republic of Korea
053	Australia and New Zealand
376	Israel (Note: In international trade statistics, the Southern African Customs Union is also treated as a developed region, and Israel as a developed country in Western Asia.)
018	Southern Africa
	Developing regions (Note: The definition of developing countries is not standardized, but it generally excludes the transition countries.)
002	Africa (sometimes excluding Southern Africa)
419/019	Latin America and the Caribbean / Americas (Note: For some economical analysis, this grouping currently uses the code 019 defined for all Americas, instead of using the code 419 which is assigned to Latin America and the Caribbean)
029	Caribbean
013	Central America
005	South America
142*	Asia (* excluding Japan: 392, the Republic of Korea: 410, and sometimes also Israel: 376)
009*	Oceania (* excluding Australia and New Zealand: 053)
778	Transition countries (Note: In some reports, the transition countries may be part of developing countries, or will most often be classed separately from developed and developing countries.)
172	Commonwealth of Independent States (CIS)
	Transition countries of South-eastern Europe (Note: The selected economical grouping of transition countries of South-eastern Europe is not encoded in UN M.49, but it currently includes Albania and the countries emerging from the former Yugoslavia (with the exception of Slovenia which is now considered as a developed country), for statistical use only.)

== Codes no longer in use (obsolete since 1982) ==
Old Code	Old Area	New Code(s)
128	Canton and Enderbury Islands (Note: Canton and Enderbury Islands (code 128) merged with Kiribati (code 296).)	296
200	Czechoslovakia (Note: As of 1 January 1993, Czechoslovakia split into the Czech Republic (code 203) and Slovakia (code 703).)	203, 703
720	Democratic Yemen (Note: Democratic Yemen (numerical code 720) and Yemen (886) merged on 22 May 1990 under the name Yemen (887).)	887
230	Ethiopia	231, 232
280	Federal Republic of Germany (Note: The German Democratic Republic (numerical code 278) accessed on 3 October 1990 to the Federal Republic of Germany (280), with effect from 3 October 1990 and have united to form a single country simply designated as "Germany" (276).)	276
274	Gaza Strip	275
278	German Democratic Republic	276
396	Johnston Island (Note: United States Minor Outlying Islands (numerical code 581) formed by merging Johnston Island (396), Midway Islands (488), United States Miscellaneous Pacific Islands (849), and Wake Island (872).)	581
488	Midway Islands	581
530	Netherlands Antilles (Note: The Netherlands Antilles were dissolved in 2010)	531, 534, 535
532	Netherlands Antilles (Note: The Netherlands Antilles (with previous numerical code 532) was split when Aruba (533) was separated from it, and the remaining part was then given the new numerical code 530.)	530, 533
582	Pacific Islands (Trust Territory) (Note: Various districts that composed the Trust Territory of the Pacific Islands were split successively from the trusteeship and gained independence to form the Republic of the Marshall Islands (numerical code 584), the Federated States of Micronesia (583), and the Republic of Palau (585). The Commonwealth of the Northern Mariana Islands (580) was later set up in political union with the U.S.)	580, 583, 584, 585
891	Serbia and Montenegro (Note: Serbia and Montenegro (numerical code 891) dissolved on 3 June 2006 into 2 independent countries: Montenegro (499) and Serbia (688).)	499, 688
890	Socialist Federal Republic of Yugoslavia (Note: Prior to 1 January 1992, the same numerical code 890 referred to the Socialist Federal Republic of Yugoslavia, which was composed of six republics, before the independence of Slovenia (705), Croatia (191), Bosnia and Herzegovina (070), and the Republic of Macedonia (807); the remaining Yugoslav Federation was then dissolved and renamed to form the Federation of Serbia and Montenegro (891, now also dissolved).)	070, 191, 705, 807, 891
062	South-Central Asia	034, 143
736	Sudan (Note: South Sudan (numerical code 728) became independent from Sudan (736) on July 9, 2011. The remaining part of Sudan was given the new numerical code 729.)	728, 729
810	Union of Soviet Socialist Republics (Note: The Union of Soviet Socialist Republics dissolved in 1991 into 15 independent countries: in Western Asia: Armenia (numerical code 051), Azerbaijan (031) and Georgia (268); in Central Asia: Kazakhstan (398), Kyrgyzstan (417), Tajikistan (762), Turkmenistan (795) and Uzbekistan (860); in Northern Europe: Estonia (233), Latvia (428) and Lithuania (440); in Eastern Europe: Belarus (numerical code 112), the Republic of Moldova (498), Ukraine (804), and the Russian Federation (643).)	031, 051, 112, 233, 268, 398, 417, 428, 440, 498, 762, 795, 804, 860
849	United States miscellaneous Pacific Islands	581
872	Wake Island	581
886	Yemen	887

== See also ==
- Address geocoding
- ISO 3166-1 numeric
- United Nations geoscheme
- List of countries by United Nations geoscheme
