= QO =

Qo or QO may refer to:

- Aeromexpress (IATA airline designator QO)
- Origin Pacific Airways (IATA airline designator QO)
- QO, a line of electrical circuit breakers made by Square D
- Qoheleth, a.k.a. Ecclesiastes, a book of the Hebrew Bible
- quaestiō, Latin for "question", a possible origin of the question mark
- Quickoffice, a software package
- QO, the region subtag used in the Unicode Common Locale Data Repository for Outlying Oceania
