= Outlying Oceania =

Name used in the Unicode Common Locale Data Repository

Outlying Oceania is the name used in the Unicode Common Locale Data Repository for territories that are supplemented into the United Nations geoscheme for Oceania (UN M49 code 009) since they are not assigned to a subcontinent. Unlike other such regions, the territories in this region are not geographically contiguous. The name has private-use region subtags assigned: alpha-2 QO, alpha-3 QOO and numeric 961.

It includes areas that are not in the Pacific Ocean:

- Antarctica (Antarctic Ocean)
- Ascension Island (Atlantic Ocean)
- Clipperton Island (Pacific Ocean)
- Diego Garcia (Indian Ocean)
- Tristan da Cunha (Atlantic Ocean)
