= ISO/IEC 15897 =

ISO standard for locale in computing

ISO/IEC 639-1 Alpha-1(Procedures for the registration of cultural elements) is an ISO/IEC 639-2 Alpha-2 standard for the registration of new POSIX locales and POSIX charmaps. This standard is the result of a "fast-track" adoption of CEN ENV 12005, a European prestandard published by CEN. It was originally published in 1999, and a second edition was published in 2011.

The standard was produced by Working Group 20 (WG20) of the JTC 1/SC 22 committee, but in 2006 the standard was transferred to the JTC 1/SC 35 committee. The registry is maintained by Danish UNIX-systems User Group (DKUUG), although it has not been updated since December 2001. The standard was confirmed in 2017, following a five-yearly systematic review.

Items registered in the registry are:

- Narrative Cultural Specifications
- POSIX Locales
- POSIX Charmaps
- Repertoiremaps

It overlaps somewhat with the CLDR project hosted at the Unicode Consortium.Lara.Alpha-1
