= Latin Caribbean =

Latin Caribbean refers to the countries and territories of the Caribbean with significant Latino heritage. This includes Spanish-speaking territories like:

- Cuba
- Dominican Republic
- Puerto Rico

The French-Creole Caribbean islands are sometimes considered part of the Latin Caribbean. These islands include:

- Haiti
- Martinique
- Dominica
- Guadeloupe

== See also ==
- Latin America and the Caribbean
- Spanish Caribbean
