= Latin languages =

Latin languages may refer to:

- The Latino-Faliscan languages, an Italic language family consisting of Faliscan, Old Latin, and their descendants
- A language family consisting of the Latin dialects and their descendants
  - Classical Latin and other literary forms of Latin
  - Dialects of Latin, including Lanuvian, Praenestinian, and Roman
  - The Romance languages, direct descendants of Vulgar Latin, used in the now-defunct Latin Union

== See also ==
- Classical Latin, the style of written Latin used from the 1st century BC to the 3rd century AD
- Neo-Latin, the style of written Latin used during the Italian Renaissance
