= Latin America and the Caribbean =

Subregion of the Americas

- Area: 21,951,000 km^{2} (8,475,000 sq mi)
- Population: 670,230,000
- Demonym: Latin American and Caribbean
- Countries: 33 countries: Antigua and Barbuda; Argentina; Bahamas; Barbados; Belize; Bolivia; Brazil; Chile; Colombia; Costa Rica; Cuba; Dominica; Dominican Republic; Ecuador; El Salvador; Grenada; Guatemala; Guyana; Haiti; Honduras; Jamaica; Mexico; Nicaragua; Panama; Paraguay; Peru; Saint Kitts and Nevis; Saint Lucia; Saint Vincent and the Grenadines; Suriname; Trinidad and Tobago; Uruguay; Venezuela
- Dependencies: 19 dependencies: Anguilla; Aruba; Bonaire; British Virgin Islands; Cayman Islands; Curaçao; Falkland Islands; French Guiana; Guadeloupe; Martinique; Montserrat; Puerto Rico; Saba; Saint Barthélemy; Saint Martin; Sint Eustatius; Sint Maarten; Turks and Caicos Islands; United States Virgin Islands
- Languages: Spanish, Portuguese, English, French, Dutch, Haitian Creole, Papiamento, and various Indigenous languages
- Time zone: UTC−02:00 to UTC−08:00
- UN M49 codes: 419 – Latin America and the Caribbean

Latin America and the Caribbean (LAC) is a geopolitical and cultural region encompassing the Americas south of the contiguous United States. It includes all countries and territories in the Americas but the United States, Canada, Greenland, Bermuda and Saint Pierre and Miquelon (Northern America). It covers an extensive region, extending from The Bahamas and Mexico in the north to Argentina and Chile in the south. In contrast to Latin America, LAC also includes countries in Central America, South America, and the Caribbean where non-Latin languages—e.g. English or Dutch—are predominantly or officially spoken, such as Belize, Guyana, and Jamaica.

The region has over 670,230,000 people as of 2016, and spans for 21,951,000 square kilometres (8,475,000 sq mi).

== Politics ==
Map of V-Dem Electoral Democracy Index in Latin America and the Caribbean for 2023: 0.900–1.000 0.800–0.899 0.700–0.799 0.600–0.699 / 0.500–0.599 0.400–0.499 0.300–0.399 0.200–0.299 / 0.100–0.199 0.000–0.099 No data

The region has a unique history and oscillated between stability to instability, including various deadly conflicts, with conflict remaining a constant. Two of the deadliest conflicts in the region are the Colombian conflict and the Mexican drug war; and more recently, there is also the crisis in Venezuela and Gang war in Haiti. Some other bloody conflicts include the internal conflict in Peru and gang wars in Brazil and Honduras. Other conflicts include the Mapuche conflict in Argentina and Chile; and the Insurgency in Paraguay. These conflicts, however, have received less attention from international media, and varied by time.

The Latin American and Caribbean countries with the most representative democracy were Costa Rica, Uruguay, Argentina, Chile, and Jamaica and least democratic were Nicaragua, Cuba and Venezuela according to 2024 V-Dem Democracy Report.

== Culture ==
=== Religion ===
Most countries are dominated by Christianity, the largest denomination being Roman Catholicism. Smaller groups include Protestantism (including Mormonism and Jehovah's Witnesses) and Orthodoxy and other forms of Christianity. There are many venerated folk saints and folk religions, namely folk Catholicism, as well as African diaspora religions (syncretic African traditional religions) as well as Native American religions, including shamanism. Many folk healers also practice folk magic. Specific Creole peoples often have their own religions/spiritual practices like the Maroons' Rastafari and Garifuna's belief system (or New Orleans Voodoo and Melungeon in North America).

Especially in the Caribbean, Central America and Brazil, there are Jewish (including Messianic Jews), Muslim, Hindu, Baháʼí Faith (especially in Panama, Bolivia and Belize), Buddhist, Shinto, Romani mythology, Chinese folk religion, and Dravidian folk religion practitioners among others. The Muslims and especially Jews and Gitanos are often descendants of the peoples forced into Crypto-Judaism and Crypto-Islam (and even Crypto-Paganism, for lack of a better term) from the Reconquista. There most likely is Sikh and Jainist groups (and possibly even smaller Zoroastrianism, Samaritan and Druze groups). There is also a growing movement of unitarian universalism/new age/neo-paganism-type unorganized spirituality. Goddess worship is especially popular with younger, often progressive people like feminists. Again, these movements are often also syncretic, such as Pachamama or other Pre-Columbian Deity worship. Atheism/Agnosticism is quite heterogeneous, with a few countries having high percentages, but most communities are small and may be growing slowly.

=== Music ===
The region is extremely well-known for its own distinct genres of music which cannot be found elsewhere in the world. Beginning with the conquests of Latin America and the Caribbean by Spain, France, Britain, the Netherlands and Portugal in 15th century, greater inter-group mixing between Indigenous, Asian, African and European populations occurred, expanding the popularity of their music. Starting from 1950s along with rampant globalization, music from the region has become widely noticed, and has been nominated for several music awards.

=== Sports ===
The region is rich with sporting activities, especially in association football, having some of the world's strongest football teams, including from Brazil, Argentina, Uruguay, and others. Baseball, tennis, cycling, volleyball, rugby union, basketball, hockey, and cricket are also popular.

The region is known for producing significant mixed martial-arts fighters, notably competing in the Ultimate Fighting Championship, Mexico and Brazil being the ones that stand out in this sport.

== List of countries and territories by subregion ==
=== Caribbean ===
==== Scattered island in the Caribbean Sea ====
- Federal Dependencies of Venezuela (Venezuela)

==== West Indies ====
===== Antilles =====
====== Greater Antilles ======
- Cayman Islands (United Kingdom)
- Cuba
- Dominican Republic
- Haiti
- Jamaica
- Navassa Island^{*}
- Puerto Rico (United States)

^{*} Disputed territory administered by the United States, claimed by Haiti.

====== Lesser Antilles ======
- Anguilla (United Kingdom)
- Antigua and Barbuda
  - Antigua
  - Barbuda
- Barbados
- British Virgin Islands (United Kingdom)
- Dominica
- Dutch Caribbean
  - Aruba (Netherlands)
  - BES islands (Netherlands)
    - Bonaire
    - Sint Eustatius
    - Saba
  - Curaçao (Netherlands)
  - Sint Maarten (Netherlands)
- Federal Dependencies (Venezuela)
- Grenada
  - Carriacou and Petite Martinique
- Guadeloupe (France)
  - La Désirade
  - Les Saintes
  - Marie-Galante
- Martinique (France)
- Montserrat (United Kingdom)
- Nueva Esparta (Venezuela)
- Saint Barthélemy (France)
- Saint Kitts and Nevis
  - Saint Kitts
  - Nevis
- Saint Lucia
- Saint Martin (France)
- Saint Vincent and the Grenadines
  - Saint Vincent
  - Grenadines
- Spanish Virgin Islands (Puerto Rico)
- Trinidad and Tobago
- U.S. Virgin Islands (United States)

===== Lucayan Archipelago =====
- Bahamas
- Turks and Caicos Islands (United Kingdom)

=== Latin America ===
==== Central America ====
- Belize
- Costa Rica
- El Salvador
- Guatemala
- Honduras
- Mexico^{*}
- Nicaragua
- Panama

^{*} The UN geoscheme includes Mexico in Central America.

===== Offshore islands =====
- Bajo Nuevo Bank^{*}
- San Andrés and Providencia (Colombia)
- Serranilla Bank^{*}

^{*} Disputed territories administered by Colombia, claimed by the United States.

==== South America ====
- Argentina
- Bolivia
- Bouvet Island^{*} (Norway)
- Brazil
- Chile
- Colombia
- Ecuador
- Falkland Islands^{†}
- French Guiana (France)
- Guyana
- Paraguay
- Peru
- Suriname
- Trinidad and Tobago
- Uruguay
- Venezuela

^{*} The UN geoscheme includes Bouvet Island in South America instead of Antarctica or Africa.

^{†} Disputed territories administered by the United Kingdom, claimed by Argentina.

== See also ==
- Americas (terminology)
- Caribbean – West Indies
- Caribbean South America
- Central America
- Community of Latin American and Caribbean States (CELAC)
- Hispanic America
- Ibero-America
- Latin America
- Latin American and Caribbean Group
- Latin Americans
- Latin Caribbean
- Lucayan Archipelago
- North America
- Northern America
- South America
- United Nations Economic Commission for Latin America and the Caribbean
- United Nations geoscheme
- United Nations geoscheme for the Americas
- United Nations Statistics Division (UNSD)
