= Common Locale Data & Rules =

Computing project for a user locale data format

- Developed by: Unicode Consortium
- Initial release: CLDR 1.0 (19 December 2003; 22 years ago)
- Latest release: 49; 21 October 2026; 4 days ago
- Container for: XML
- Website: cldr.unicode.org

The Common Locale Data & Rules, formerly the Common Locale Data Repository (CLDR) is a project of the Unicode Consortium to provide locale data in XML format for use in computer applications. CLDR contains locale-specific information that an operating system will typically provide to applications.

The language CLDR is written in was formerly called the Locale Data Markup Language (LDML). In version 49, the name Common Locale Data & Rules was adopted, and designated as referring both to the language specification, and to the data itself.

CLDR is maintained by a technical committee which includes employees from IBM, Apple, Google, Microsoft, and some government-based organizations. The committee is chaired by Mark Davis of Google; Annemarie Apple of Google is vice-chair.

== Details ==
Among the types of data that CLDR includes are the following:

- Translations for language names
- Translations for territory and country names
- Translations for currency names, including singular/plural modifications
- Translations for weekday, month, era, period of day, in full and abbreviated forms
- Translations for time zones and example cities (or similar) for time zones
- Translations for calendar fields
- Patterns for formatting/parsing dates or times of day
- Exemplar sets of characters used for writing the language
- Patterns for formatting/parsing numbers
- Rules for language-adapted collation
- Rules for spelling out numbers as words
- Rules for formatting numbers in traditional numeral systems (such as Roman and Armenian numerals)
- Rules for transliteration between scripts, much of it based on BGN/PCGN romanization

The information is currently used in International Components for Unicode, Apple's macOS, LibreOffice, MediaWiki, and IBM's AIX, among other applications and operating systems.

CLDR overlaps somewhat with ISO/IEC 15897 (POSIX locales). POSIX locale information can be derived from CLDR by using some of CLDR's conversion tools.

The CLDR covers more than 400 languages.
