= List of Oceanian regions by life expectancy =

This is a list of Oceanian regions according to estimation of the Global Data Lab, as of 15 October 2024. By default, regions within country are sorted by overall life expectancy in 2022. Countries are sorted by the most favorable for life expectancy region inside them.

country or special territory	region	2019				2019 →2021	2021	2021 →2022	2022				2019 →2022
country or special territory	region	overall	male	female	F Δ M	2019 →2021	overall	2021 →2022	overall	male	female	F Δ M	2019 →2022
Australia	Capital Territory	83.91	—	—	—	1.83	85.74	−0.96	84.78	—	—	—	0.87
Australia	Western Australia	83.31	—	—	—	1.72	85.03	−0.95	84.08	—	—	—	0.77
Australia	Victoria	83.71	—	—	—	1.22	84.93	−0.95	83.98	—	—	—	0.27
Australia	New South Wales	83.21	—	—	—	1.42	84.63	−0.95	83.68	—	—	—	0.47
Australia	South Australia	82.81	—	—	—	1.51	84.32	−0.94	83.38	—	—	—	0.57
Australia	Queensland	82.71	—	—	—	1.41	84.12	−0.94	83.18	—	—	—	0.47
Australia	Tasmania	81.91	—	—	—	1.60	83.51	−0.93	82.58	—	—	—	0.67
Australia	Northern Territory	78.42	—	—	—	1.34	79.76	−0.90	78.86	—	—	—	0.44
New Zealand	Auckland	83.48	81.72	85.19	3.47	−0.12	83.36	0.56	83.92	82.27	85.54	3.27	0.44
New Zealand	Tasman - Nelson	83.07	81.22	84.88	3.66	−0.11	82.96	0.56	83.52	81.76	85.24	3.48	0.45
New Zealand	Marlborough	82.82	80.91	84.68	3.77	−0.12	82.70	0.56	83.26	81.46	85.03	3.57	0.44
New Zealand	Wellington	82.77	80.91	84.58	3.67	−0.12	82.65	0.56	83.21	81.46	84.93	3.47	0.44
New Zealand	Canterbury	82.67	80.91	84.38	3.47	−0.12	82.55	0.56	83.11	81.46	84.73	3.27	0.44
New Zealand	Otago	82.36	80.51	84.17	3.66	−0.11	82.25	0.55	82.80	81.05	84.52	3.47	0.44
New Zealand	Bay of Plenty	82.31	80.30	84.28	3.98	−0.11	82.20	0.55	82.75	80.84	84.62	3.78	0.44
New Zealand	Waikato	82.16	80.20	84.07	3.87	−0.11	82.05	0.55	82.60	80.74	84.42	3.68	0.44
New Zealand	Taranaki	82.01	80.10	83.87	3.77	−0.12	81.89	0.56	82.45	80.64	84.22	3.58	0.44
New Zealand	Northland	81.81	79.69	83.87	4.18	−0.12	81.69	0.55	82.24	80.23	84.22	3.99	0.43
New Zealand	Hawke's Bay	81.70	79.80	83.57	3.77	−0.11	81.59	0.55	82.14	80.33	83.91	3.58	0.44
New Zealand	West Coast	81.60	79.80	83.36	3.56	−0.11	81.49	0.55	82.04	80.33	83.71	3.38	0.44
New Zealand	Manawatu-Wanganui	81.60	79.59	83.57	3.98	−0.11	81.49	0.55	82.04	80.13	83.91	3.78	0.44
New Zealand	Southland	81.45	79.49	83.36	3.87	−0.11	81.34	0.54	81.88	80.03	83.71	3.68	0.43
New Zealand	Gisborne	79.47	77.36	81.54	4.18	−0.11	79.36	0.53	79.89	77.88	81.88	4.00	0.42
Samoa	Savaiʻi	74.91	—	—	—	0.00	74.91	0.00	74.91	71.73	77.59	5.86	0.00
Samoa	Rest of Upolu	74.18	—	—	—	0.00	74.18	0.00	74.18	71.05	76.73	5.68	0.00
Samoa	North West Upolu	73.37	—	—	—	0.00	73.37	0.00	73.37	70.30	75.77	5.47	0.00
Samoa	Apia Urban Area	73.36	—	—	—	0.00	73.36	0.00	73.36	70.29	75.76	5.47	0.00
Tonga	—	70.87	68.27	73.67	5.40	0.12	70.99	0.28	71.27	68.58	74.12	5.54	0.40
Micronesia	—	71.08	67.58	74.84	7.26	−0.37	70.71	0.22	70.93	67.33	74.82	7.49	−0.15
Solomon Islands	—	70.38	—	—	—	−0.03	70.35	0.39	70.74	69.29	72.36	3.07	0.36
Vanuatu	—	69.88	—	—	—	0.57	70.45	0.04	70.49	68.32	73.07	4.75	0.61
Kiribati	Northern Gilbert	69.43	—	—	—	0.28	69.71	0.25	69.96	67.97	72.15	4.18	0.53
Kiribati	Line and Phoenix Group	68.13	—	—	—	0.27	68.40	0.25	68.65	66.70	70.58	3.88	0.52
Kiribati	Southern Gilbert	67.75	—	—	—	0.27	68.02	0.25	68.27	66.33	70.12	3.79	0.52
Kiribati	Souyth Tarawa	66.41	—	—	—	0.26	66.67	0.25	66.92	65.00	68.48	3.48	0.51
Kiribati	Central Gibert	63.85	—	—	—	0.25	64.10	0.24	64.34	62.41	65.32	2.91	0.49
Fiji	Ba	67.93	66.15	69.76	3.61	−0.55	67.38	1.21	68.59	66.72	70.56	3.84	0.66
Fiji	Naitasiri	67.52	65.78	69.30	3.52	−0.91	66.61	1.19	67.80	65.98	69.64	3.66	0.28
Fiji	Cakaudrove, Bua	67.28	65.11	69.71	4.60	−1.11	66.17	1.18	67.35	65.04	69.93	4.89	0.07
Fiji	Tailevu	67.17	65.00	69.58	4.58	−1.11	66.06	1.17	67.23	64.94	69.80	4.86	0.06
Fiji	Rewa	66.79	64.64	69.14	4.50	−1.11	65.68	1.18	66.86	64.58	69.35	4.77	0.07
Fiji	Nadroga or Navosa	66.52	64.39	68.83	4.44	−1.10	65.42	1.17	66.59	64.33	69.04	4.71	0.07
Fiji	Kadavu, Lau, Lomaiviti, Rotuma	65.83	63.73	68.01	4.28	−1.09	64.74	1.16	65.90	63.67	68.23	4.56	0.07
Fiji	Serua, Namosi	65.61	63.52	67.76	4.24	−1.08	64.53	1.15	65.68	63.46	67.97	4.51	0.07
Fiji	Macuata	65.54	63.45	67.67	4.22	−1.09	64.45	1.15	65.60	63.39	67.88	4.49	0.06
Fiji	Ra	65.02	62.95	67.06	4.11	−1.08	63.94	1.14	65.08	62.89	67.27	4.38	0.06
Tuvalu	Funafuti	63.87	60.22	68.35	8.13	0.26	64.13	0.31	64.44	60.76	68.88	8.12	0.57

== See also ==
- List of Oceanian countries by life expectancy
- List of Australian states by life expectancy
- List of oldest people
- Longevity
- Life extension
