= List of Oceanian countries by life expectancy =

Oceanian countries by life expectancy

This is a list of Oceanian countries by life expectancy at birth.

== United Nations (2023) ==
Estimation of the analytical agency of the UN.

=== UN: Estimate of life expectancy for various ages in 2023 ===
Countries and territories	Life expectancy for population in general							Life expectancy for male				Life expectancy for female				Sex gap				Population (thous.)	
Countries and territories	at birth	bonus 0→15	at 15	bonus 15→65	at 65	bonus 65→80	at 80	at birth	at 15	at 65	at 80	at birth	at 15	at 65	at 80	at birth	at 15	at 65	at 80	Population (thous.)	
French Polynesia	84.07	0.58	69.65	1.85	21.50	3.72	10.23	81.78	67.37	19.58	8.88	86.50	72.07	23.48	11.37	4.73	4.70	3.90	2.48	281	(French Polynesia)
Australia	83.92	0.35	69.27	2.38	21.65	3.35	10.00	82.10	67.45	20.32	9.14	85.74	71.08	22.93	10.74	3.64	3.62	2.62	1.60	26451	(Australia)
New Zealand	82.09	0.54	67.63	3.15	20.77	3.64	9.42	80.41	65.97	19.72	8.86	83.77	69.29	21.79	9.89	3.36	3.32	2.06	1.03	5173	(New Zealand)
Oceania	79.15	1.77	65.92	4.59	20.51	4.13	9.65	76.88	63.74	19.15	8.85	81.51	68.19	21.85	10.34	4.63	4.45	2.71	1.49	45563	
Northern Mariana Islands	78.81	0.57	64.38	3.45	17.84	5.08	7.91	77.13	62.72	16.60	7.22	80.74	66.30	19.19	8.47	3.61	3.58	2.59	1.24	45	(Northern Mariana Islands)
New Caledonia	78.77	1.02	64.78	4.35	19.14	3.50	7.64	76.28	62.40	17.93	6.94	81.29	67.18	20.27	8.17	5.01	4.78	2.34	1.23	290	(New Caledonia)
Wallis and Futuna Islands	78.63	1.10	64.73	3.44	18.17	5.62	8.79	77.66	63.43	16.94	8.04	79.62	66.08	19.46	9.40	1.96	2.65	2.52	1.35	11	(Wallis and Futuna)
Guam	77.21	1.14	63.35	6.95	20.29	5.63	10.92	73.44	59.62	18.10	9.42	81.42	67.50	22.44	12.16	7.98	7.88	4.33	2.74	167	(Guam)
Tokelau	77.05	0.55	62.60	4.98	17.58	5.37	7.95	74.95	60.54	15.81	7.02	78.92	64.42	19.11	8.68	3.97	3.87	3.31	1.66	2	(Tokelau)
Cook Islands	75.28	0.64	60.92	5.67	16.58	5.99	7.58	71.87	57.50	14.80	6.75	79.05	64.69	18.48	8.18	7.18	7.19	3.68	1.42	14	(Cook Islands)
World	73.17	3.29	61.46	6.11	17.57	5.75	8.31	70.55	58.91	16.01	7.43	75.89	64.09	18.98	8.96	5.34	5.18	2.97	1.53	8091735	
Tonga	72.89	0.98	58.87	6.54	15.41	6.54	6.96	69.37	55.40	13.51	6.14	76.41	62.32	17.18	7.53	7.04	6.92	3.66	1.39	105	(Tonga)
American Samoa	72.85	0.85	58.71	6.75	15.46	6.45	6.91	70.20	56.09	14.22	6.59	75.84	61.66	16.70	7.15	5.64	5.57	2.48	0.55	48	(American Samoa)
Samoa	71.70	1.39	58.09	6.65	14.74	6.84	6.57	69.86	56.30	13.41	5.94	73.66	59.99	16.02	7.00	3.80	3.68	2.61	1.05	217	(Samoa)
Vanuatu	71.48	1.53	58.01	6.42	14.43	6.82	6.25	69.44	56.01	13.25	5.87	73.93	60.42	15.90	6.87	4.48	4.41	2.65	1.00	320	(Vanuatu)
Solomon Islands	70.53	1.66	57.19	6.51	13.70	7.01	5.71	69.22	55.99	13.04	5.48	71.98	58.52	14.40	5.95	2.77	2.52	1.36	0.47	800	(Solomon Islands)
Niue	69.98	2.03	57.01	7.05	14.06	7.13	6.20	67.43	54.57	12.61	5.59	72.71	59.62	15.33	6.56	5.28	5.04	2.72	0.97	2	(Niue)
Palau	69.27	1.88	56.15	7.72	13.87	7.34	6.21	67.15	54.13	12.54	5.60	71.80	58.58	15.21	6.58	4.64	4.45	2.67	0.98	18	(Palau)
Fiji	67.32	2.21	54.52	7.60	12.13	8.40	5.53	65.34	52.69	10.79	4.66	69.36	56.41	13.33	6.09	4.02	3.73	2.54	1.43	924	(Fiji)
F.S. Micronesia	67.20	1.95	54.15	9.27	13.42	7.72	6.14	63.49	50.55	11.59	5.35	71.12	57.93	15.00	6.50	7.63	7.37	3.41	1.15	113	(Federated States of Micronesia)
Tuvalu	67.11	1.73	53.83	9.76	13.59	7.58	6.17	63.77	50.54	11.71	5.45	70.70	57.36	15.12	6.63	6.93	6.82	3.41	1.18	10	(Tuvalu)
Marshall Islands	66.94	2.34	54.29	8.84	13.12	7.79	5.91	64.93	52.40	11.95	5.38	69.33	56.54	14.48	6.28	4.40	4.14	2.53	0.90	39	(Marshall Islands)
Kiribati	66.47	4.38	55.86	7.59	13.44	7.23	5.68	64.58	54.27	12.58	5.34	68.17	57.19	14.03	5.84	3.59	2.92	1.45	0.50	133	(Kiribati)
Papua New Guinea	66.13	3.21	54.35	8.48	12.82	7.81	5.63	63.74	52.07	11.74	5.23	69.08	57.17	14.18	6.04	5.35	5.09	2.44	0.81	10390	(Papua New Guinea)
Nauru	62.11	2.25	49.36	12.97	12.33	8.13	5.46	60.28	47.45	10.88	5.17	64.00	51.35	13.64	6.09	3.72	3.90	2.76	0.92	12	(Nauru)

=== UN: Change of life expectancy from 2019 to 2023 ===
Countries and territories	2023				Historical data									Recovery from COVID-19: 2019→2023	Population (thous.)	
Countries and territories	All	Male	Female	Sex gap	2019	2019 →2020	2020	2020 →2021	2021	2021 →2022	2022	2022 →2023	2023	Recovery from COVID-19: 2019→2023	Population (thous.)	
French Polynesia	84.07	81.78	86.50	4.73	83.19	−0.74	82.46	−2.89	79.57	4.29	83.86	0.21	84.07	0.88	281	(French Polynesia)
Australia	83.92	82.10	85.74	3.64	83.24	0.42	83.66	−0.10	83.56	−0.80	82.77	1.16	83.92	0.68	26451	(Australia)
New Zealand	82.09	80.41	83.77	3.36	81.83	0.83	82.66	−0.36	82.30	−1.29	81.01	1.08	82.09	0.26	5173	(New Zealand)
Oceania	79.15	76.88	81.51	4.63	78.57	0.28	78.85	−0.40	78.45	−0.39	78.06	1.08	79.15	0.58	45563	
Northern Mariana Islands	78.81	77.13	80.74	3.61	77.84	0.19	78.03	0.13	78.16	0.37	78.53	0.28	78.81	0.96	45	(Northern Mariana Islands)
New Caledonia	78.77	76.28	81.29	5.01	77.26	−0.21	77.05	0.06	77.11	0.58	77.70	1.07	78.77	1.50	290	(New Caledonia)
Wallis and Futuna Islands	78.63	77.66	79.62	1.96	77.99	0.17	78.16	−0.70	77.46	1.04	78.50	0.13	78.63	0.64	11	(Wallis and Futuna)
Guam	77.21	73.44	81.42	7.98	76.64	−1.12	75.53	−0.10	75.43	1.67	77.10	0.11	77.21	0.56	167	(Guam)
Tokelau	77.05	74.95	78.92	3.97	76.45	0.17	76.62	0.10	76.72	0.17	76.89	0.16	77.05	0.60	2	(Tokelau)
Cook Islands	75.28	71.87	79.05	7.18	74.56	−0.04	74.51	0.07	74.58	0.50	75.08	0.20	75.28	0.73	14	(Cook Islands)
World	73.17	70.55	75.89	5.34	72.61	−0.69	71.92	−1.05	70.86	1.77	72.64	0.53	73.17	0.56	8091735	
Tonga	72.89	69.37	76.41	7.04	72.29	0.09	72.38	−0.25	72.13	0.51	72.64	0.26	72.89	0.60	105	(Tonga)
American Samoa	72.85	70.20	75.84	5.64	72.75	−0.08	72.67	0.04	72.71	0.04	72.75	0.10	72.85	0.10	48	(American Samoa)
Samoa	71.70	69.86	73.66	3.80	70.27	0.46	70.73	0.37	71.10	0.45	71.55	0.15	71.70	1.43	217	(Samoa)
Vanuatu	71.48	69.44	73.93	4.48	70.78	−0.40	70.39	−0.43	69.95	1.35	71.30	0.17	71.48	0.69	320	(Vanuatu)
Solomon Islands	70.53	69.22	71.98	2.77	69.98	−0.72	69.26	−0.37	68.89	1.52	70.41	0.12	70.53	0.55	800	(Solomon Islands)
Niue	69.98	67.43	72.71	5.28	69.30	0.17	69.47	0.10	69.57	0.25	69.82	0.16	69.98	0.68	2	(Niue)
Palau	69.27	67.15	71.80	4.64	68.98	−0.29	68.69	−0.13	68.56	0.36	68.92	0.35	69.27	0.29	18	(Palau)
Fiji	67.32	65.34	69.36	4.02	67.01	−0.09	66.92	−2.02	64.90	2.24	67.15	0.17	67.32	0.31	924	(Fiji)
F.S. Micronesia	67.20	63.49	71.12	7.63	66.20	−0.32	65.88	0.27	66.15	0.81	66.96	0.24	67.20	1.00	113	(Federated States of Micronesia)
Tuvalu	67.11	63.77	70.70	6.93	66.11	0.25	66.36	−0.53	65.82	1.03	66.85	0.25	67.11	1.00	10	(Tuvalu)
Marshall Islands	66.94	64.93	69.33	4.40	66.05	−0.66	65.39	0.03	65.42	1.30	66.72	0.22	66.94	0.90	39	(Marshall Islands)
Kiribati	66.47	64.58	68.17	3.59	65.87	−0.66	65.20	−1.06	64.15	2.12	66.27	0.20	66.47	0.61	133	(Kiribati)
Papua New Guinea	66.13	63.74	69.08	5.35	65.33	−0.26	65.08	−0.72	64.36	0.92	65.27	0.86	66.13	0.80	10390	(Papua New Guinea)
Nauru	62.11	60.28	64.00	3.72	61.39	0.13	61.53	−0.20	61.33	0.60	61.93	0.18	62.11	0.72	12	(Nauru)

== World Bank Group (2024) ==
Estimation of the World Bank Group for 2024. The data is filtered according to the list of countries in Oceania. The values in the World Bank Group tables are rounded. All calculations are based on raw data, so due to the nuances of rounding, in some places illusory inconsistencies of indicators arose, with a size of 0.01 year.

World Bank Group (2024)
Countries and territories	2024				Historical data													recovery from COVID-19: 2019→2024	
Countries and territories	All	Male	Female	Sex gap	2014	2014 →2019	2019	2019 →2020	2020	2020 →2021	2021	2021 →2022	2022	2022 →2023	2023	2023 →2024	2024	recovery from COVID-19: 2019→2024	
French Polynesia	84.19	81.90	86.62	4.72	82.15	1.04	83.19	−0.74	82.46	−2.89	79.57	4.29	83.86	0.21	84.07	0.12	84.19	1.00	(French Polynesia)
Australia	83.05	81.10	85.10	4.00	82.30	0.60	82.90	0.30	83.20	0.10	83.30	−0.10	83.20	−0.15	83.05	0.00	83.05	0.15	(Australia)
New Zealand	82.01	80.40	83.70	3.30	81.46	0.60	82.06	0.20	82.26	−0.05	82.21	−0.25	81.96	−0.20	81.76	0.25	82.01	−0.05	(New Zealand)
Northern Mariana Islands	78.95	77.28	80.87	3.59	77.38	0.47	77.84	0.19	78.03	0.13	78.16	0.37	78.53	0.28	78.81	0.14	78.95	1.10	(Northern Mariana Islands)
New Caledonia	78.92	76.46	81.41	4.95	77.05	0.21	77.26	−0.21	77.05	0.06	77.11	0.58	77.70	1.07	78.77	0.16	78.92	1.66	(New Caledonia)
Guam	77.42	73.66	81.59	7.93	76.42	0.22	76.64	−1.12	75.53	−0.09	75.43	1.67	77.10	0.11	77.21	0.21	77.42	0.78	(Guam)
World	73.48	71.11	75.97	4.86	71.78	1.09	72.87	−0.69	72.18	−0.97	71.21	1.75	72.97	0.36	73.33	0.15	73.48	0.61	
Tonga	73.07	69.50	76.54	7.04	71.72	0.57	72.29	0.09	72.38	−0.25	72.13	0.51	72.64	0.26	72.89	0.17	73.07	0.78	(Tonga)
American Samoa	72.99	70.32	75.99	5.67	72.69	0.06	72.75	−0.08	72.67	0.04	72.71	0.04	72.75	0.10	72.85	0.14	72.99	0.24	(American Samoa)
Samoa	71.83	69.96	73.82	3.86	71.14	−0.87	70.27	0.46	70.73	0.37	71.10	0.45	71.55	0.15	71.70	0.13	71.83	1.56	(Samoa)
Vanuatu	71.65	69.58	74.11	4.53	70.04	0.74	70.78	−0.40	70.39	−0.43	69.95	1.35	71.30	0.17	71.48	0.18	71.65	0.87	(Vanuatu)
Solomon Islands	70.69	69.36	72.18	2.82	68.98	1.00	69.98	−0.72	69.26	−0.37	68.89	1.52	70.41	0.12	70.53	0.17	70.69	0.71	(Solomon Islands)
Pacific island small states	69.44	67.53	71.50	3.96	68.04	0.60	68.64	−0.29	68.36	−0.88	67.48	1.62	69.10	0.17	69.27	0.17	69.44	0.80	
Palau	69.38	67.25	71.94	4.69	69.06	−0.08	68.98	−0.29	68.69	−0.13	68.56	0.36	68.92	0.35	69.27	0.11	69.38	0.40	(Palau)
Fiji	67.46	65.47	69.54	4.07	66.58	0.43	67.01	−0.08	66.92	−2.02	64.90	2.24	67.15	0.17	67.32	0.15	67.46	0.45	(Fiji)
Micronesia	67.36	63.63	71.28	7.65	65.29	0.90	66.20	−0.32	65.88	0.27	66.15	0.81	66.96	0.24	67.20	0.16	67.36	1.16	(Federated States of Micronesia)
Tuvalu	67.26	63.91	70.86	6.95	65.28	0.83	66.11	0.25	66.36	−0.53	65.82	1.03	66.85	0.25	67.11	0.15	67.26	1.15	(Tuvalu)
Marshall Islands	67.08	65.03	69.48	4.45	65.11	0.94	66.05	−0.66	65.39	0.03	65.42	1.30	66.72	0.22	66.94	0.13	67.08	1.03	(Marshall Islands)
Kiribati	66.60	64.69	68.32	3.64	65.87	0.00	65.87	−0.66	65.20	−1.06	64.15	2.12	66.27	0.20	66.47	0.13	66.60	0.73	(Kiribati)
Papua New Guinea	66.26	63.84	69.21	5.38	64.20	1.13	65.33	−0.26	65.08	−0.72	64.36	0.92	65.27	0.86	66.13	0.12	66.26	0.92	(Papua New Guinea)
Nauru	62.28	60.41	64.19	3.77	60.83	0.56	61.39	0.13	61.53	−0.20	61.33	0.60	61.93	0.18	62.11	0.17	62.28	0.89	(Nauru)

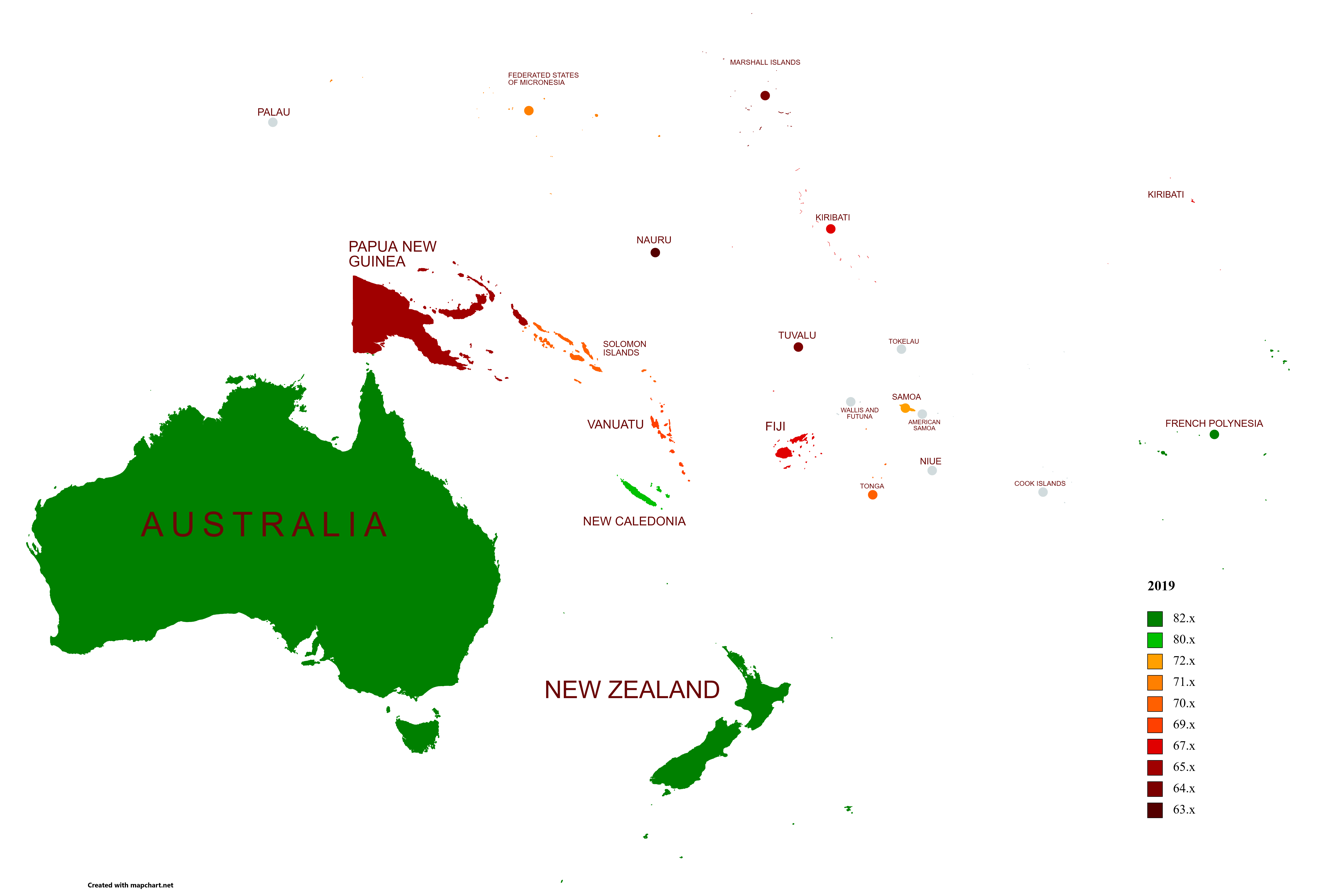
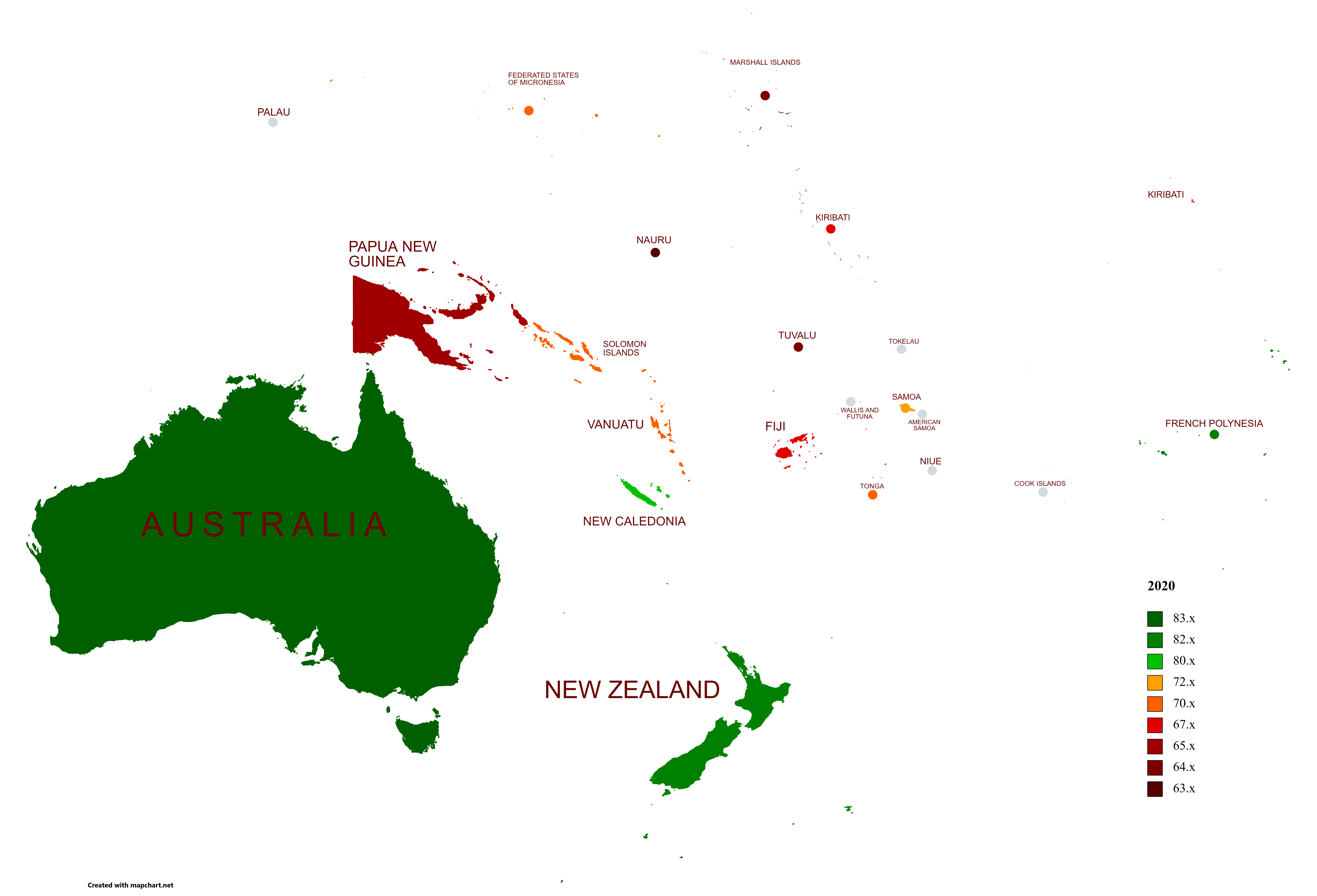
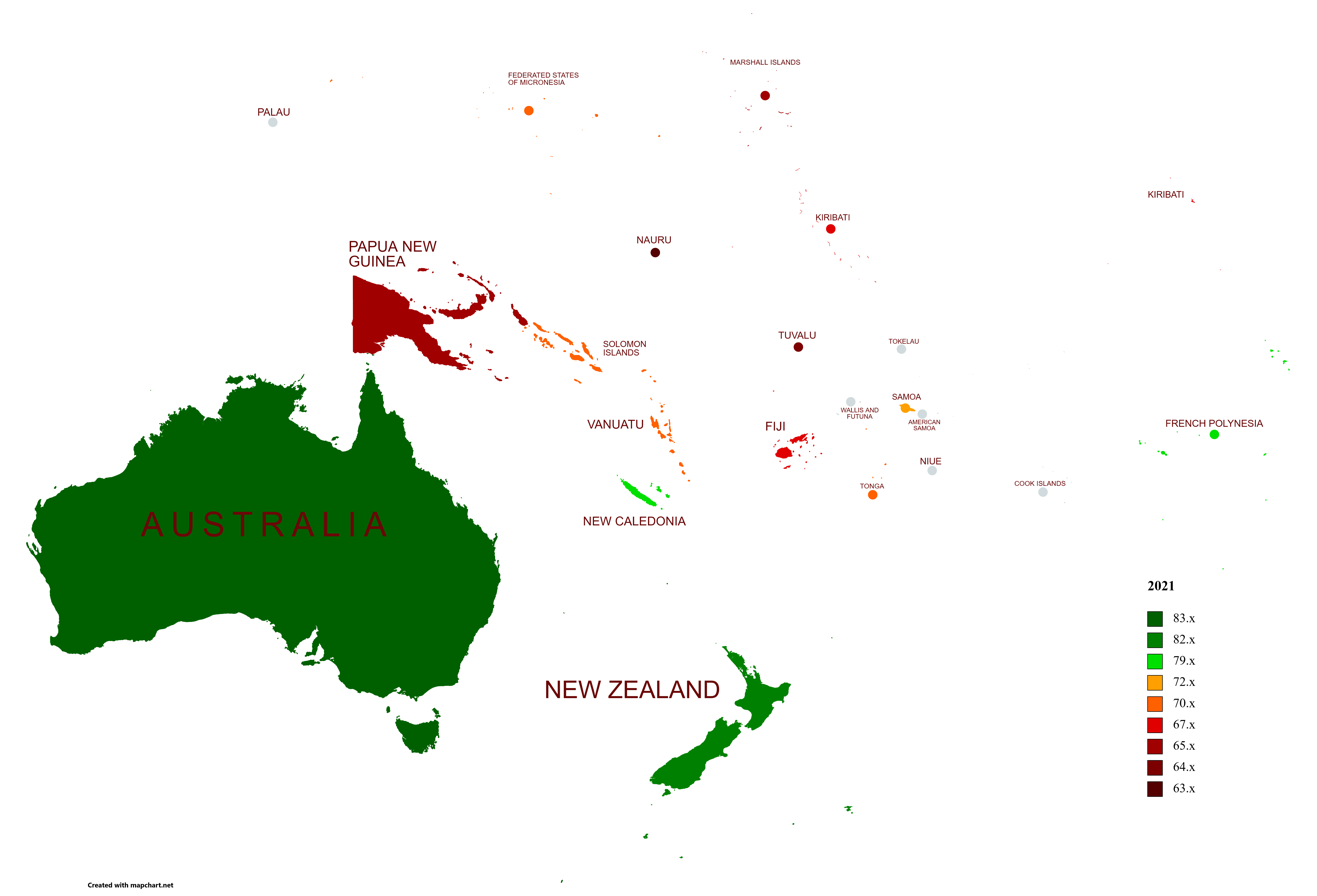
Change in life expectancy in Oceania from 2019 to 2021

== WHO (2019) ==
Estimation of the World Health Organization for 2019.

World Health Organization (2019)
Countries	Life expectancy at birth					HALE at birth					Life expectancy at age 60					HALE at age 60					
Countries	All	M	F	FΔM	Δ 2000	All	M	F	FΔM	Δ 2000	All	M	F	FΔM	Δ 2000	All	M	F	FΔM	Δ 2000	
Australia	82.64	80.72	84.57	3.85	2.94	70.26	69.68	70.84	1.16	2.15	25.35	24.05	26.60	2.55	2.24	18.81	18.08	19.53	1.45	1.45	(Australia)
New Zealand	81.81	80.16	83.43	3.27	3.23	69.74	69.50	69.98	0.48	2.47	24.72	23.60	25.77	2.17	2.34	18.52	17.95	19.07	1.12	1.62	(New Zealand)
Western Pacific	77.49	74.51	80.70	6.19	5.53	68.35	66.70	70.13	3.43	4.53	21.75	19.68	23.84	4.16	2.73	16.64	15.38	17.90	2.52	1.90	
World	73.12	70.61	75.70	5.09	6.35	63.45	62.33	64.59	2.26	5.33	21.03	19.41	22.54	3.13	2.16	15.80	14.87	16.67	1.80	1.52	
Tonga	72.94	70.38	75.60	5.22	1.99	64.05	62.97	65.21	2.24	1.34	19.04	17.41	20.65	3.24	1.15	14.44	13.55	15.32	1.77	0.70	(Tonga)
Samoa	69.99	68.77	71.31	2.54	0.39	61.42	61.11	61.77	0.66	0.16	17.64	17.22	18.06	0.84	0.56	13.30	13.20	13.41	0.21	0.32	(Samoa)
Fiji	67.87	65.78	70.09	4.31	2.04	59.67	58.64	60.77	2.13	1.54	16.01	14.71	17.27	2.56	1.47	11.96	11.13	12.76	1.63	0.94	(Fiji)
Vanuatu	67.13	64.12	70.64	6.52	2.20	59.38	57.62	61.43	3.81	1.89	16.18	15.05	17.63	2.58	0.93	12.47	11.80	13.31	1.51	0.67	(Vanuatu)
Papua New Guinea	66.67	65.57	67.92	2.35	3.31	58.47	58.09	58.92	0.83	2.90	16.77	16.34	17.28	0.94	0.75	12.68	12.48	12.92	0.44	0.51	(Papua New Guinea)
Micronesia	65.94	63.28	68.81	5.53	2.38	58.15	56.69	59.74	3.05	1.87	16.04	15.04	16.98	1.94	0.83	12.13	11.61	12.63	1.02	0.46	(Federated States of Micronesia)
Solomon Islands	65.67	63.37	68.29	4.92	2.27	58.12	57.03	59.34	2.31	1.82	15.50	14.67	16.42	1.75	0.86	11.87	11.52	12.24	0.72	0.52	(Solomon Islands)
Kiribati	62.14	58.90	65.32	6.42	2.06	54.66	52.72	56.58	3.86	1.80	15.14	13.78	16.16	2.38	0.93	11.40	10.59	12.01	1.42	0.63	(Kiribati)

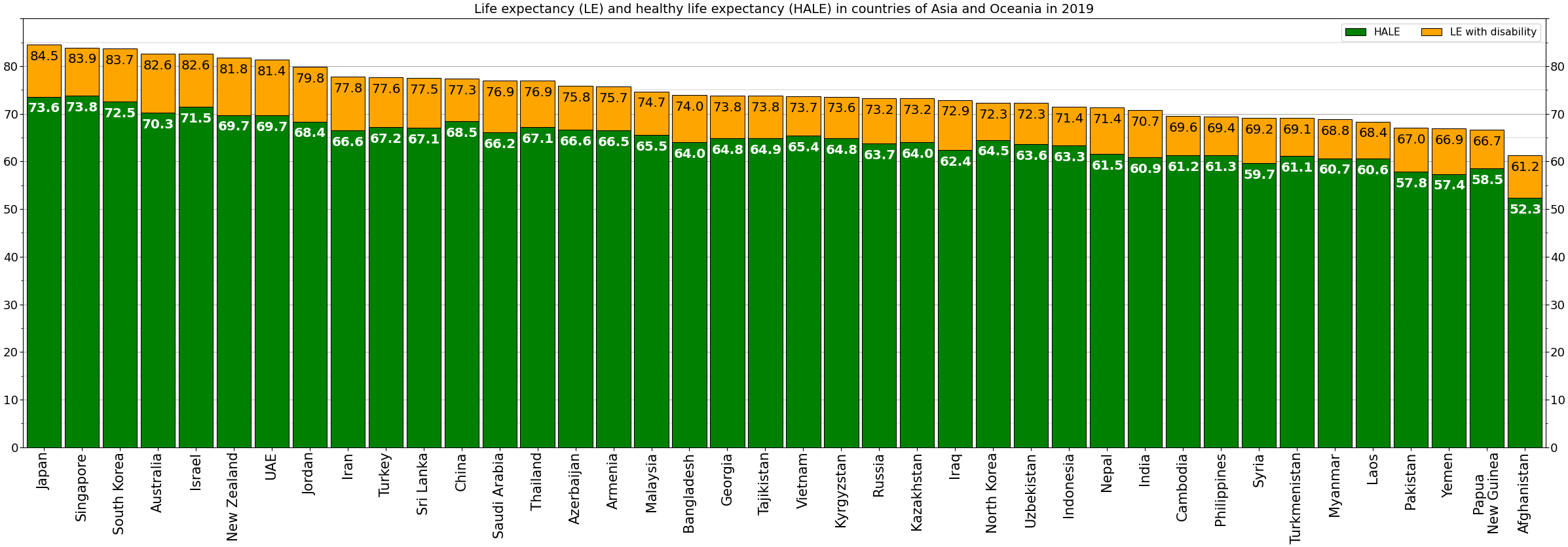
Life expectancy and HALE in countries of Asia and Oceania in 2019

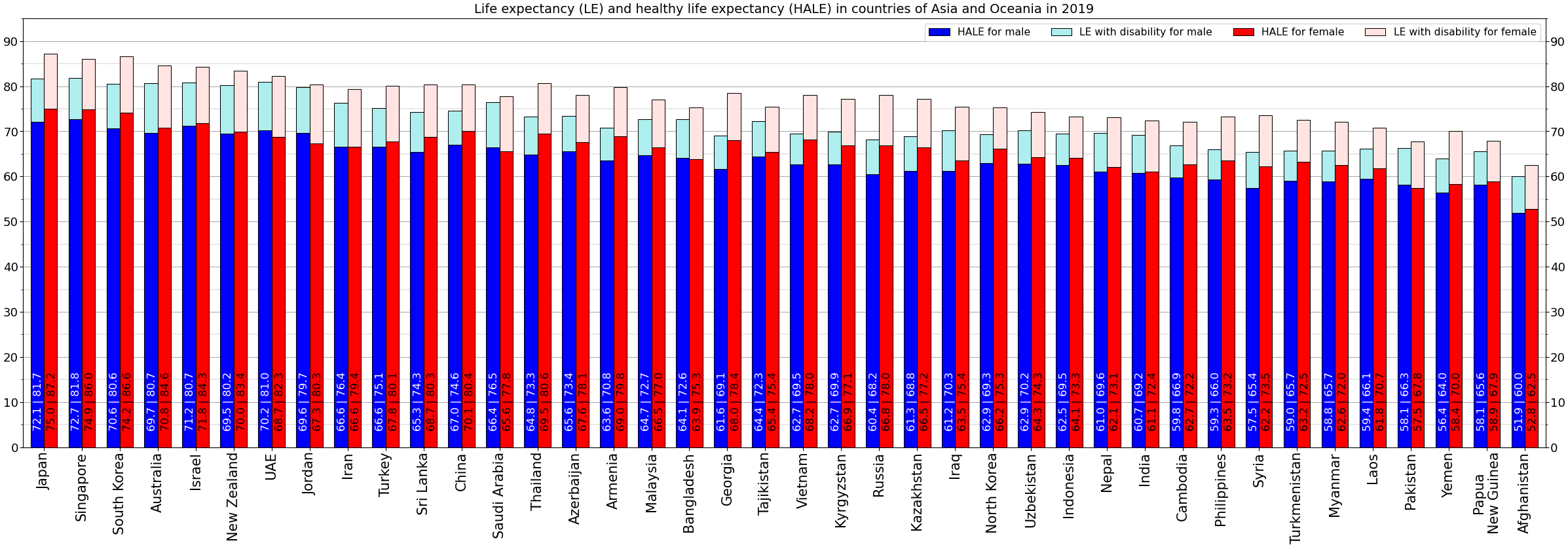
Elaboration by sex

Interactive chart of male and female life expectancy in Asia and Oceania as defined by WHO for 2019. Open the original chart and hover over chart elements. The squares of bubbles are proportional to population according to estimation of the UN for 2019.

== Charts ==
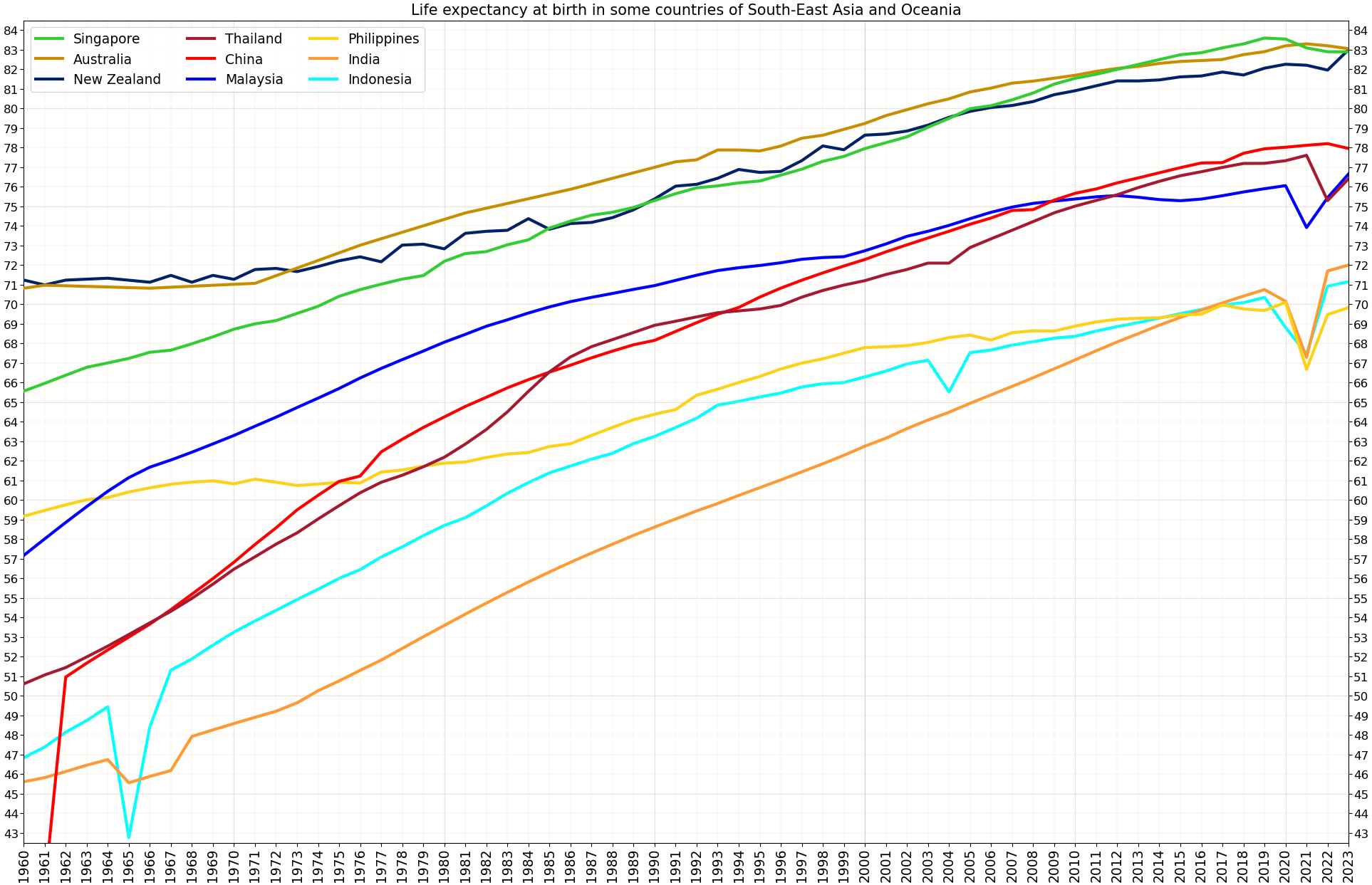
Life expectancy in some countries of South-East Asia and Oceania

== See also ==
- List of countries by life expectancy
- List of Oceanian regions by life expectancy
- List of Australian states by life expectancy
- List of oldest people
- Longevity
- Life extension
