= List of Australian states by life expectancy =

This is a list of Australian states and territories by estimated life expectancy at birth.

Australia is administratively divided into 6 states, 3 internal territories and several external territories. However, one of the internal territories - Jervis Bay - has population less than 400 people, and is usually not included in statistics as a separate territory.

According to estimation of the Australian Bureau of Statistics, life expectancy at birth in the country in period 2022–2024 was 83.0 years (81.1 for male and 85.1 for female).

According to alternative estimation of the United Nations, in 2023 life expectancy in Australia was 83.92 years (82.10 for male, 85.74 for female).

Estimation of the World Bank Group for 2023: 83.05 years total (81.10 for male, 85.10 for female).

According to estimation of the WHO for 2019, at that year life expectancy in Australia was 82.64 years (80.72 years for male and 84.57 years for female).
And healthy life expectancy was 70.26 years (69.68 years for male and 70.84 years for female).

== Australian Bureau of Statistics (2024) ==
Administrative divisions of Australia
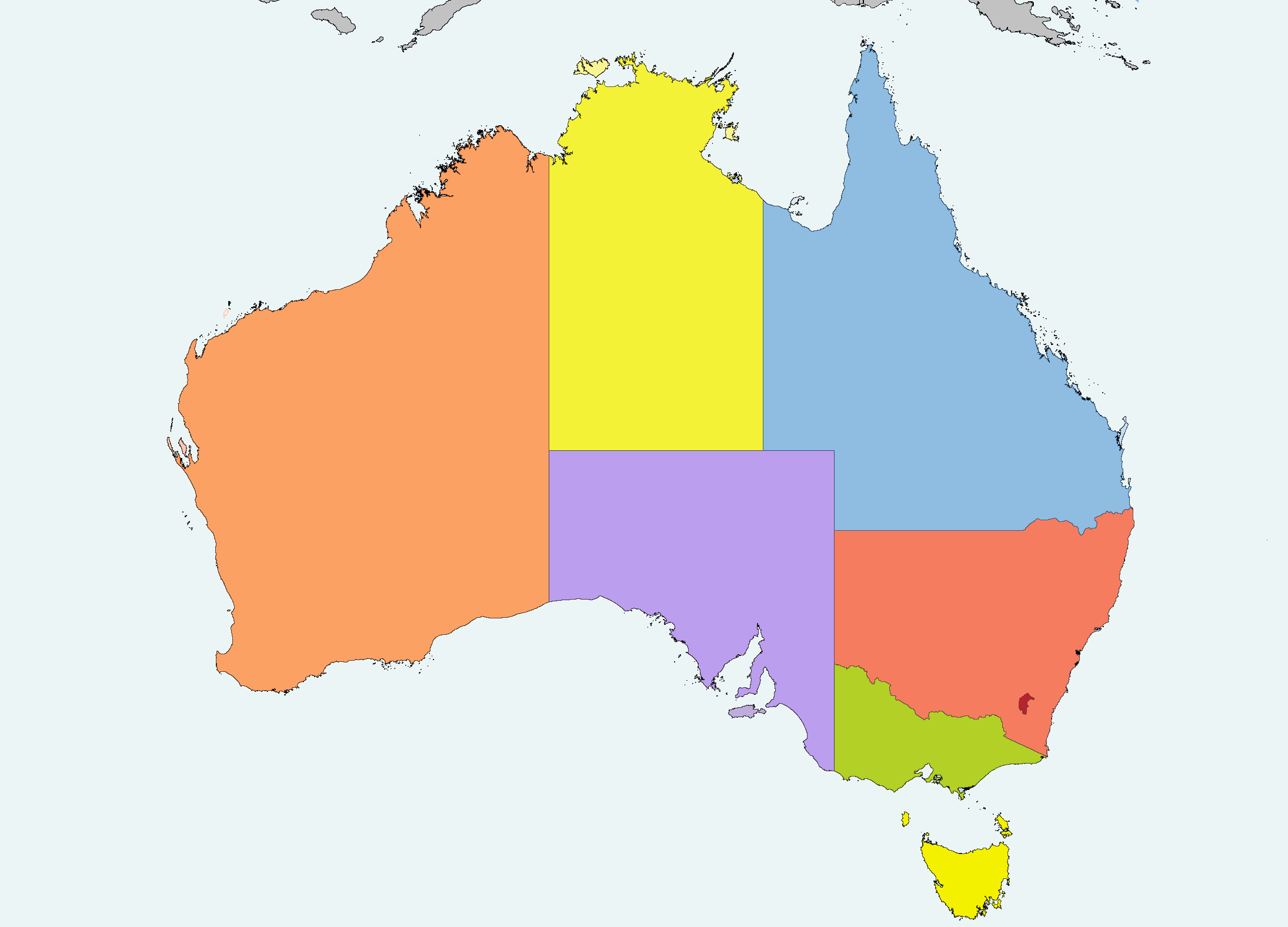

state	2019–2021				Δ1	2020–2022				Δ2	2021–2023				Δ3	2022–2024				total change
state	overall	male	female	F Δ M	Δ1	overall	male	female	F Δ M	Δ2	overall	male	female	F Δ M	Δ3	overall	male	female	F Δ M	total change
Australia	83.3	81.3	85.4	4.1	−0.1	83.2	81.2	85.3	4.1	−0.2	83.0	81.1	85.1	4.0	0.0	83.0	81.1	85.1	4.0	−0.3
Capital Territory	84.5	82.7	86.3	3.6	−0.4	84.1	82.2	86.0	3.8	−0.5	83.6	81.7	85.7	4.0	0.2	83.8	82.0	85.8	3.8	−0.7
Western Australia	83.8	81.7	85.9	4.2	−0.1	83.7	81.7	85.8	4.1	−0.1	83.6	81.6	85.7	4.1	0.0	83.6	81.5	85.7	4.2	−0.2
Victoria	83.7	81.7	85.7	4.0	−0.2	83.5	81.6	85.5	3.9	−0.1	83.4	81.5	85.4	3.9	0.0	83.4	81.5	85.4	3.9	−0.3
New South Wales	83.3	81.4	85.4	4.0	0.0	83.3	81.3	85.3	4.0	−0.2	83.1	81.2	85.2	4.0	0.1	83.2	81.2	85.3	4.1	−0.1
South Australia	83.1	81.0	85.3	4.3	−0.1	83.0	81.0	85.1	4.1	−0.1	82.9	80.9	85.0	4.1	0.0	82.9	80.9	84.9	4.0	−0.2
Queensland	82.9	80.9	85.1	4.2	−0.1	82.8	80.7	85.0	4.3	−0.2	82.6	80.5	84.7	4.2	−0.1	82.5	80.5	84.7	4.2	−0.4
Tasmania	82.3	80.3	84.4	4.1	0.0	82.3	80.3	84.3	4.0	−0.2	82.1	80.2	84.0	3.8	−0.1	82.0	80.3	83.7	3.4	−0.3
Northern Territory	78.6	76.3	81.0	4.7	−0.2	78.4	76.2	80.7	4.5	−0.1	78.3	76.4	80.4	4.0	0.5	78.8	77.0	80.7	3.7	0.2

Data source: Australian Bureau of Statistics.

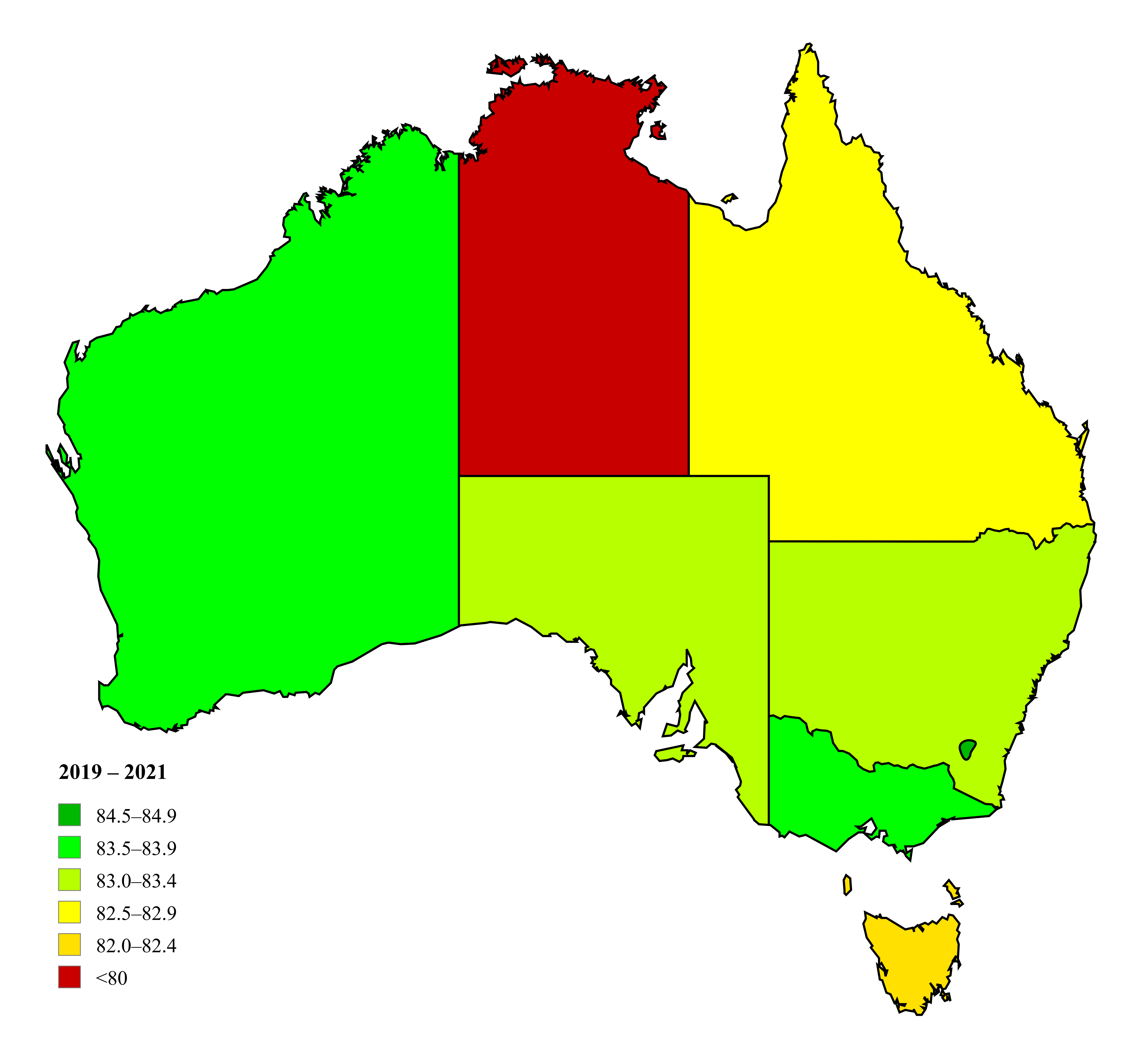
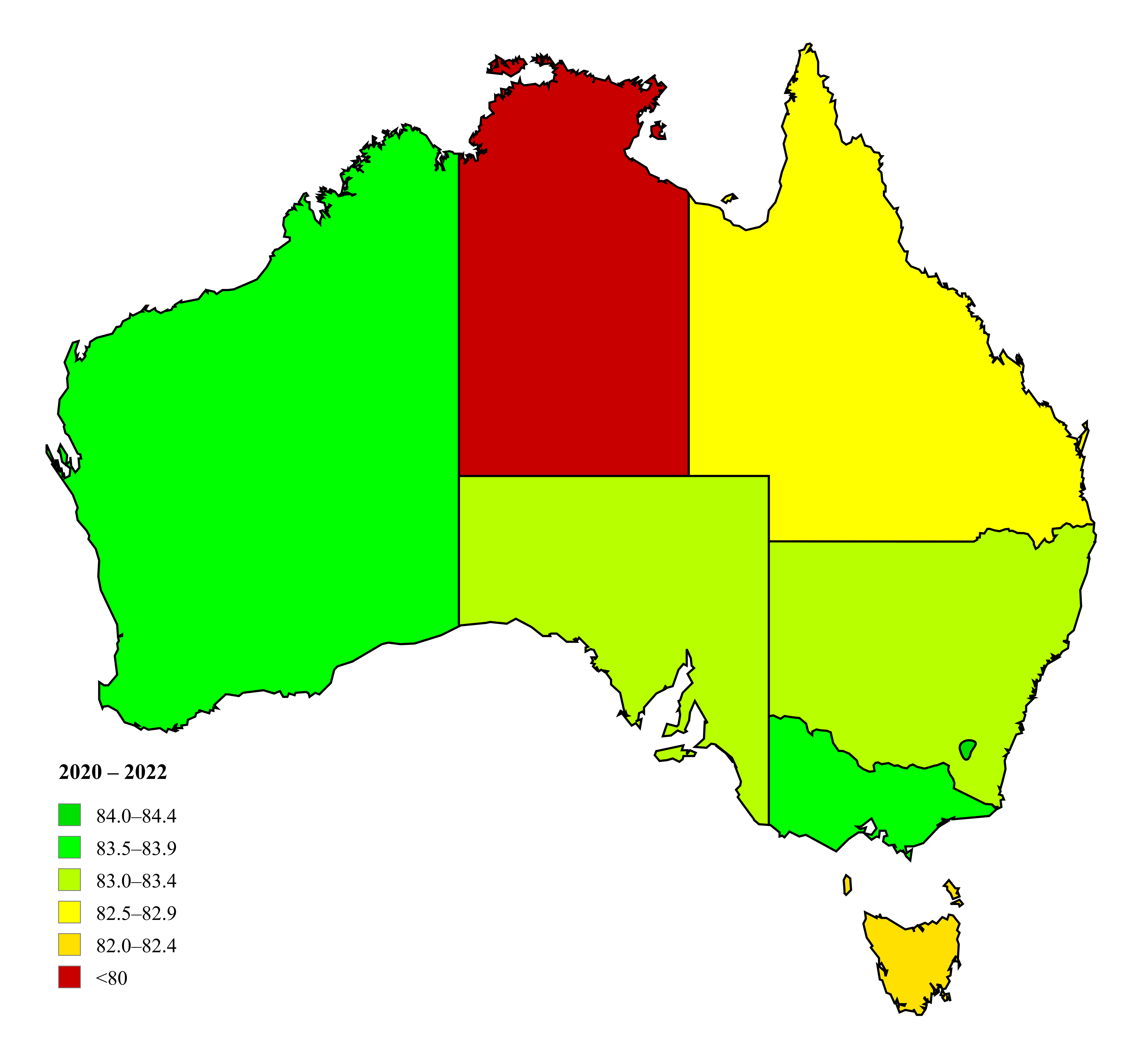
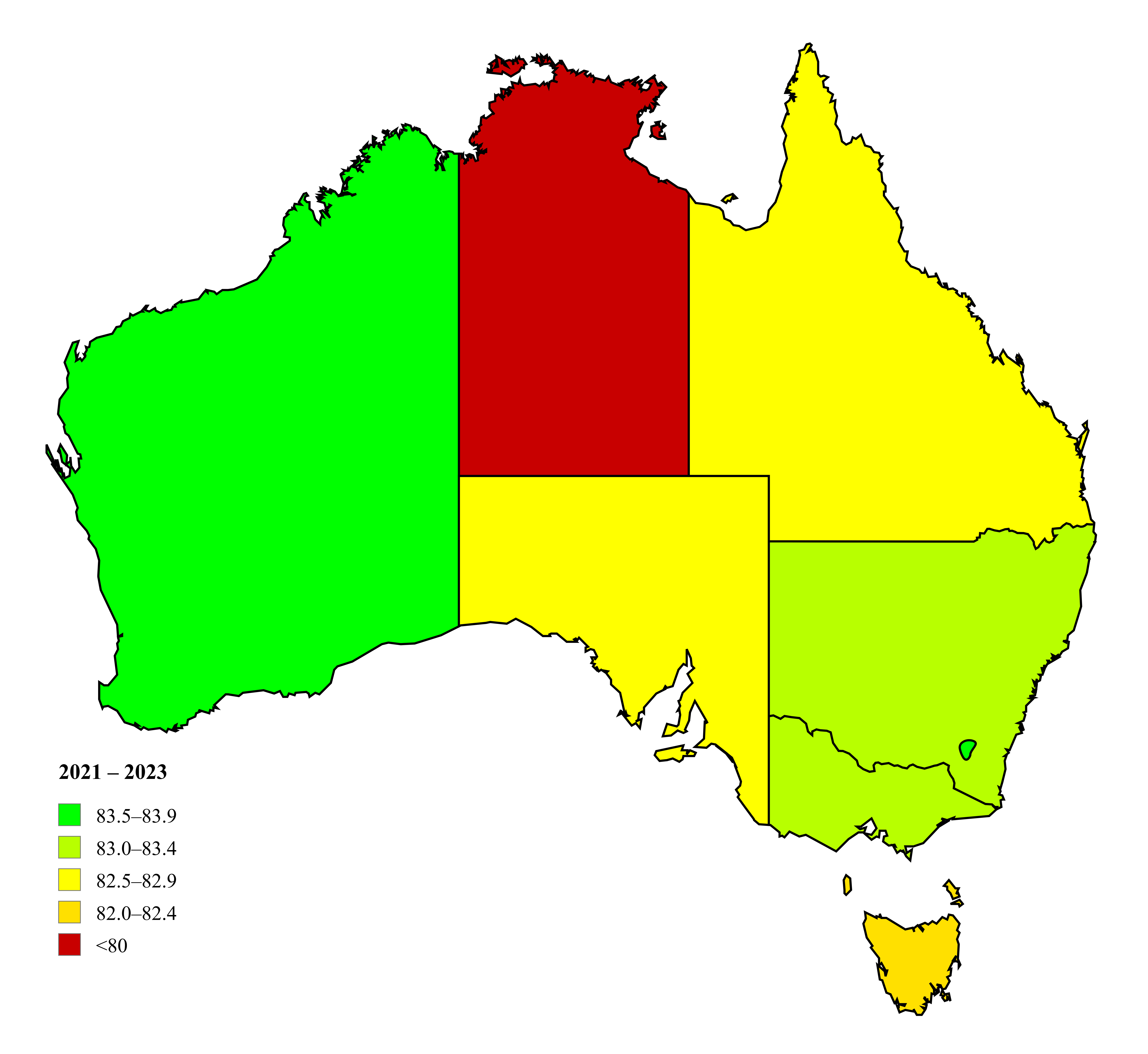
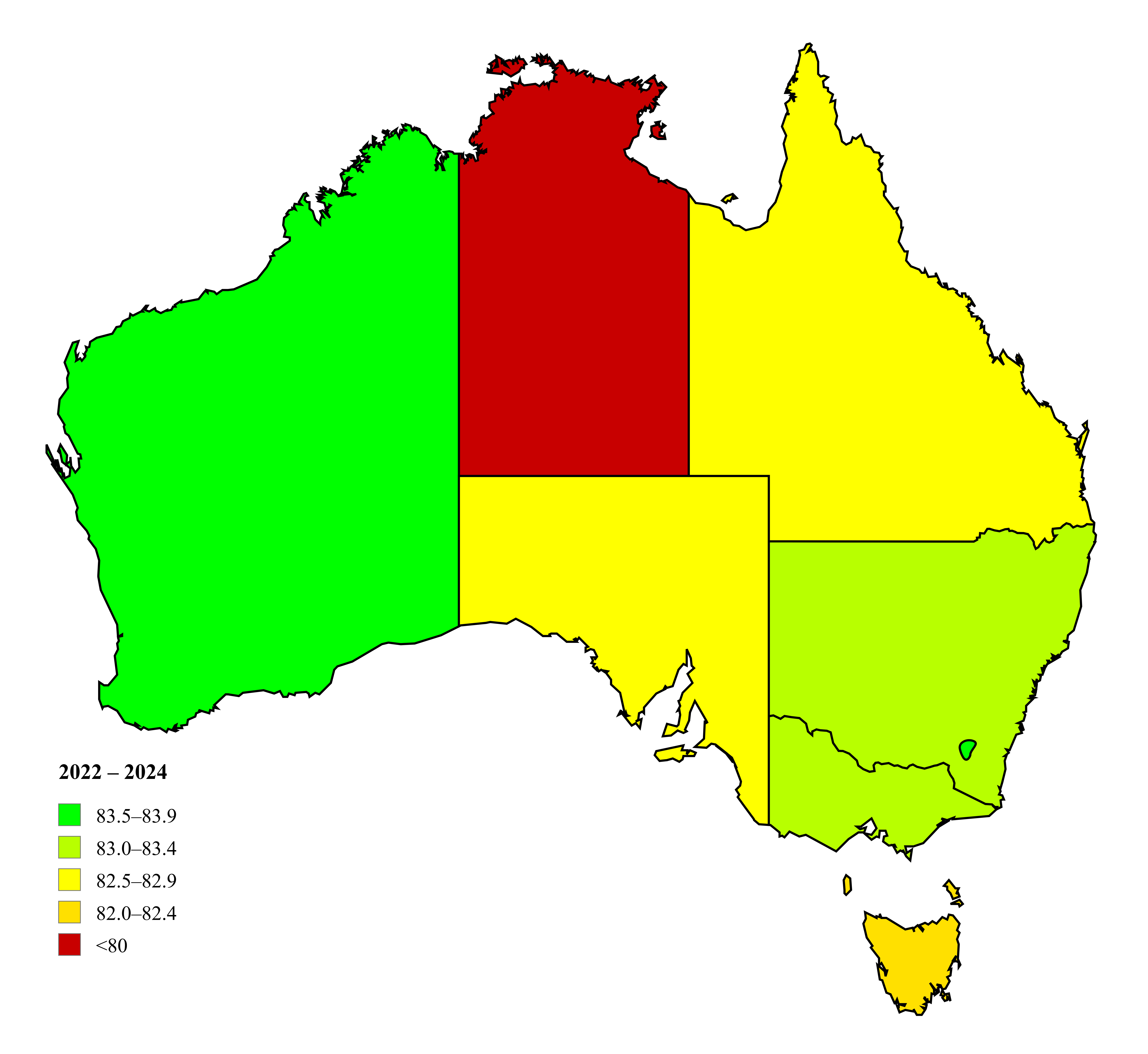
Maps of Australian states by life expectancy for the periods in the table

== Global Data Lab (2021) ==
region	2019				2019 →2020	2020	2020 →2021	2021				2019 →2021
region	overall	male	female	F Δ M	2019 →2020	overall	2020 →2021	overall	male	female	F Δ M	2019 →2021
Australia on average	83.11	81.12	85.10	3.98	1.21	84.32	0.21	84.53	83.17	85.84	2.67	1.42
Capital Territory	84.17	82.44	85.90	3.46	1.23	85.40	0.21	85.61	84.53	86.65	2.12	1.44
Victoria	83.52	81.73	85.30	3.57	1.22	84.74	0.20	84.94	83.80	86.04	2.24	1.42
Western Australia	83.46	81.33	85.60	4.27	1.22	84.68	0.21	84.89	83.38	86.35	2.97	1.43
New South Wales	83.06	81.12	85.00	3.88	1.21	84.27	0.21	84.48	83.17	85.74	2.57	1.42
South Australia	83.01	81.02	85.00	3.98	1.21	84.22	0.20	84.42	83.07	85.74	2.67	1.41
Queensland	82.76	80.72	84.79	4.07	1.20	83.96	0.21	84.17	82.76	85.53	2.77	1.41
Tasmania	81.64	79.91	83.38	3.47	1.20	82.84	0.19	83.03	81.92	84.11	2.19	1.39
Northern Territory	78.30	75.84	80.76	4.92	1.15	79.45	0.19	79.64	77.76	81.46	3.70	1.34

Data source: Global Data Lab

== Charts ==
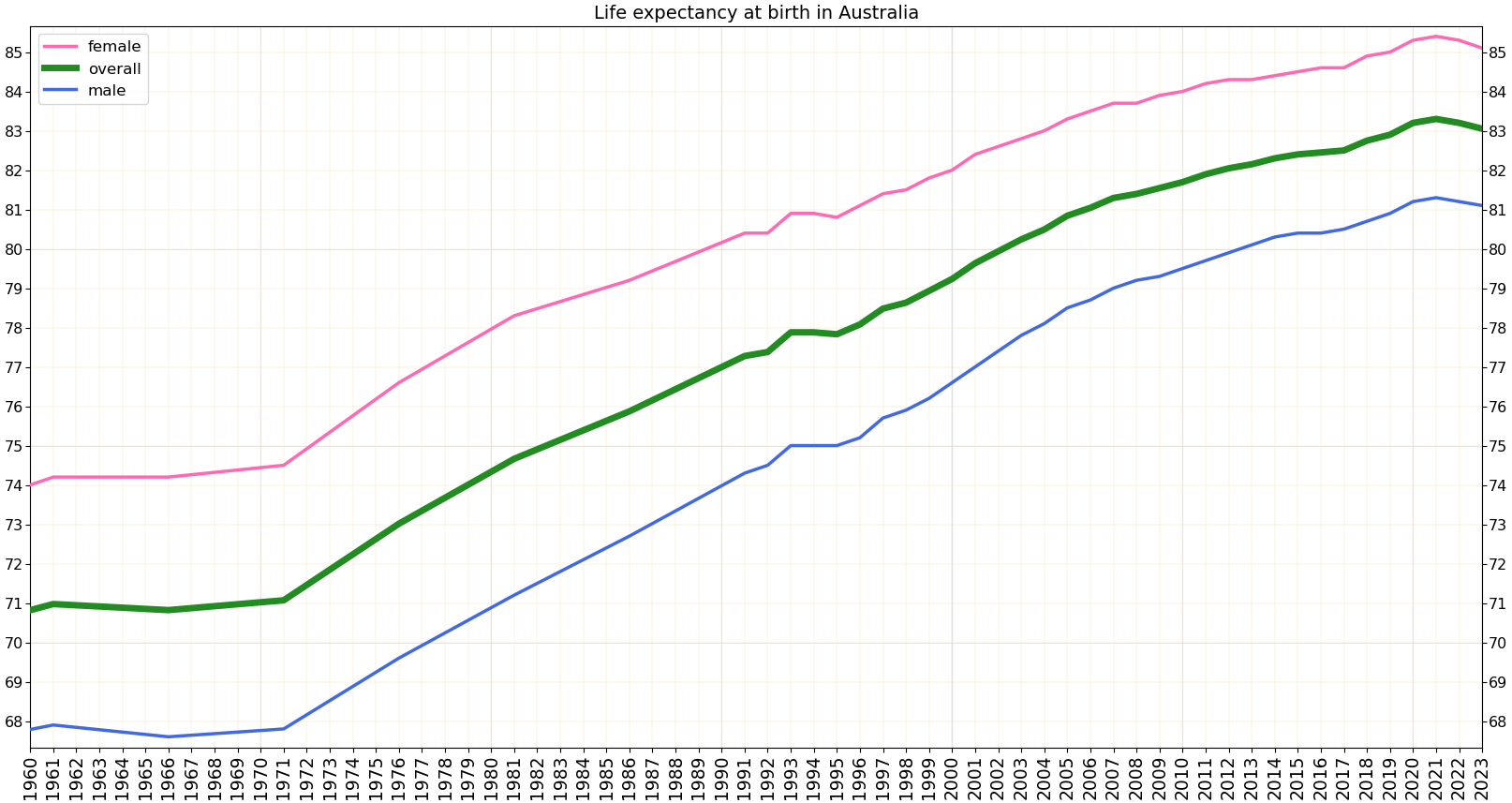
Development of life expectancy in Australia according to estimation of the World Bank Group

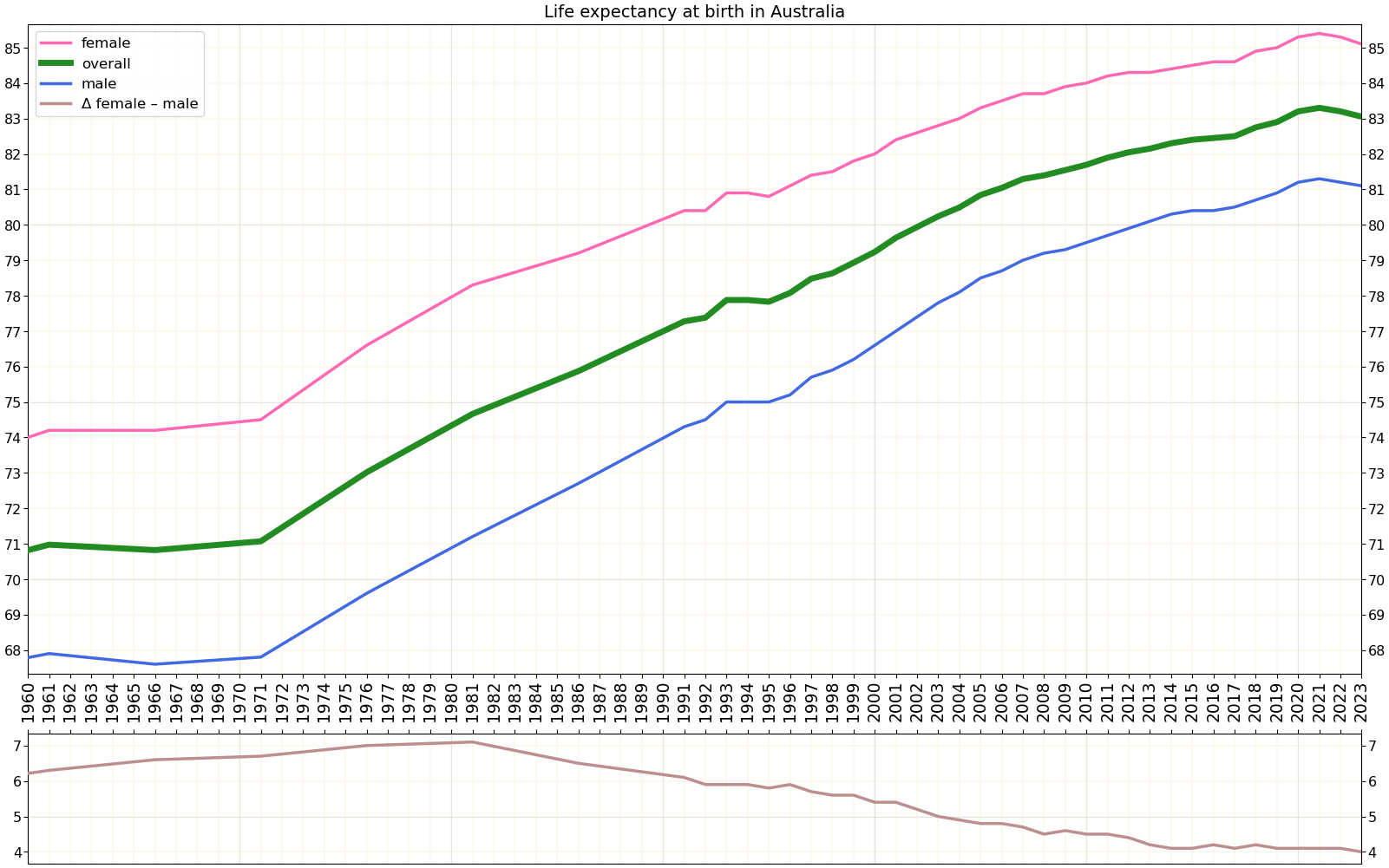
Life expectancy with calculated sex gap

Life expectancy in Australia according to estimation of Our World in Data

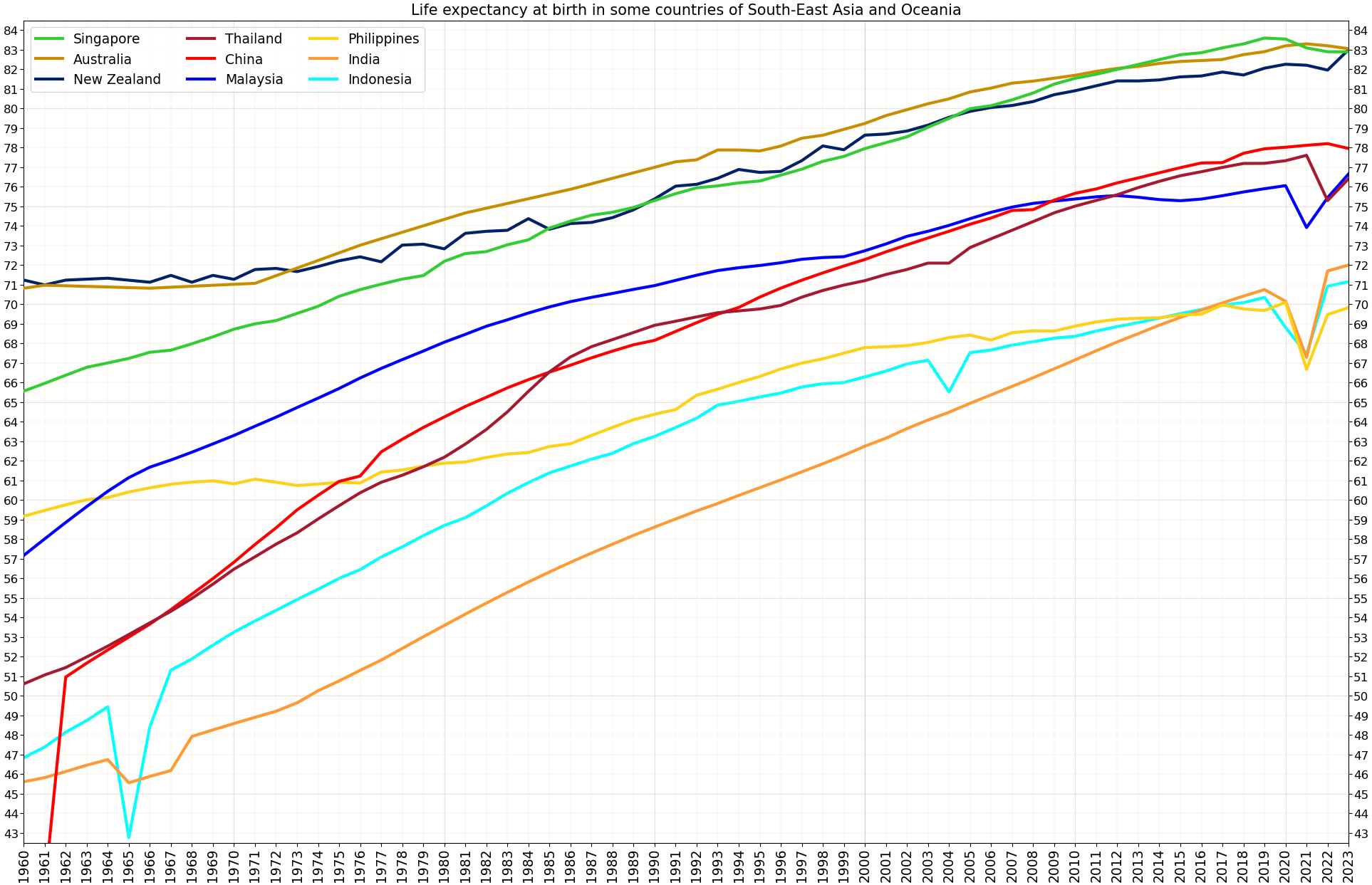
Development of life expectancy in Australia in comparison to some countries of South-East Asia and Oceania

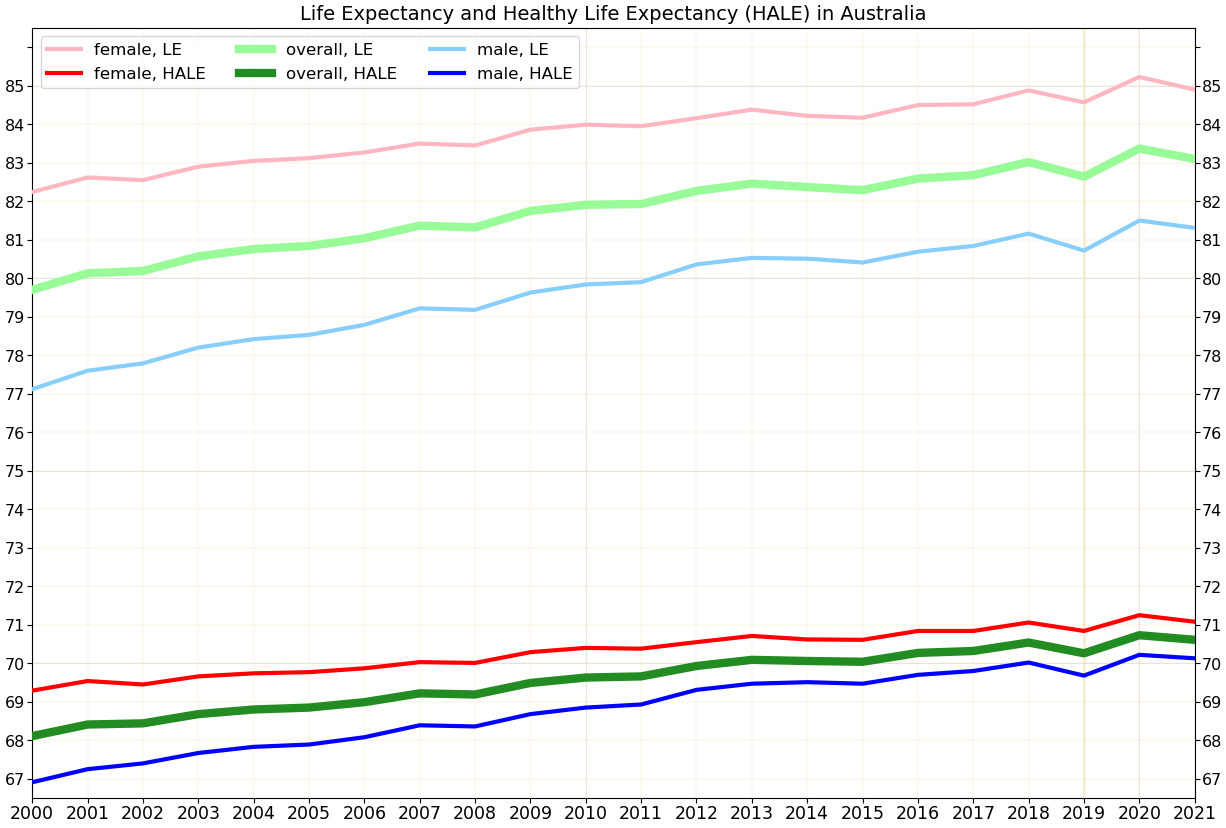
Life Expectancy and Healthy Life Expectancy (HALE) in Australia according to WHO
Life expectancy and healthy life expectancy in Australia on the background of other countries of the world in 2019

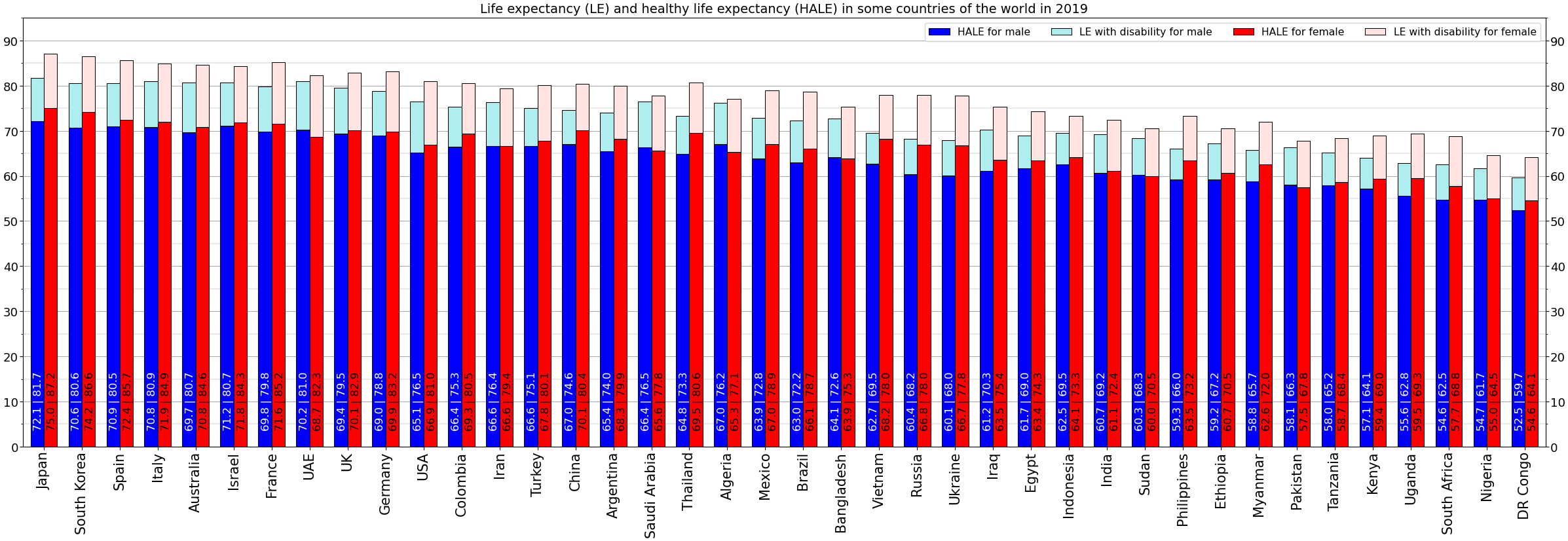
Life expectancy and healthy life expectancy for males and females separately
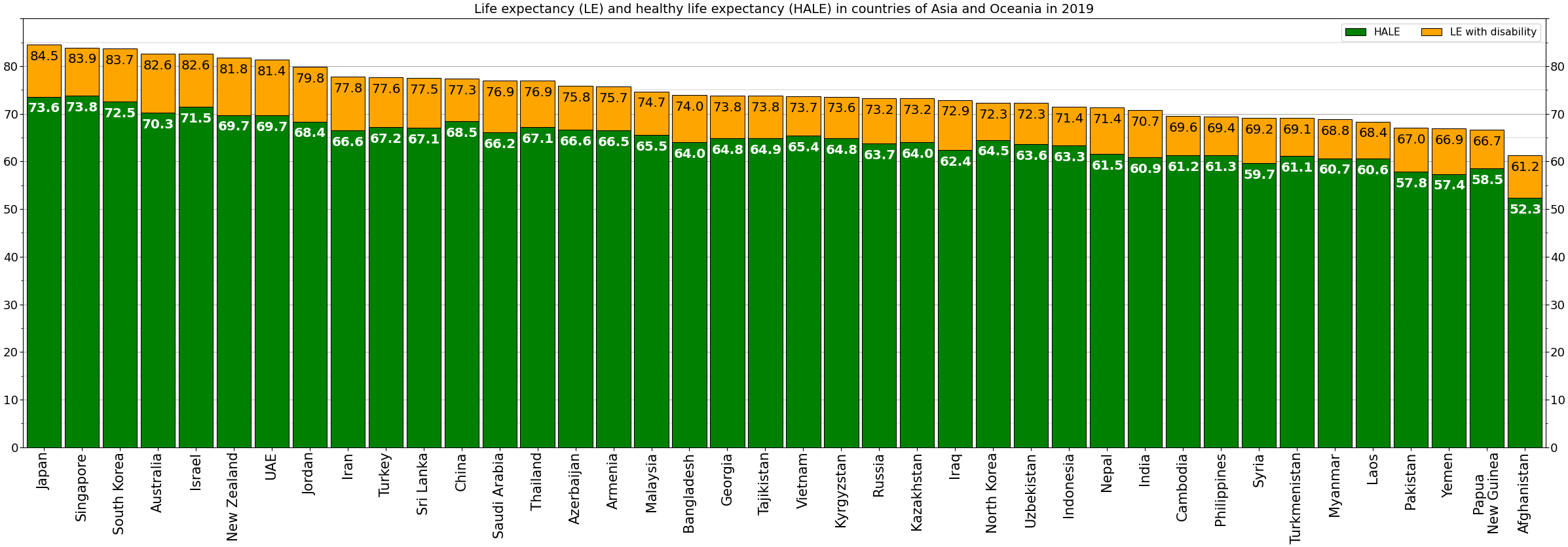
Life expectancy and healthy life expectancy in Australia on the background of countries of Asia and Oceania in 2019

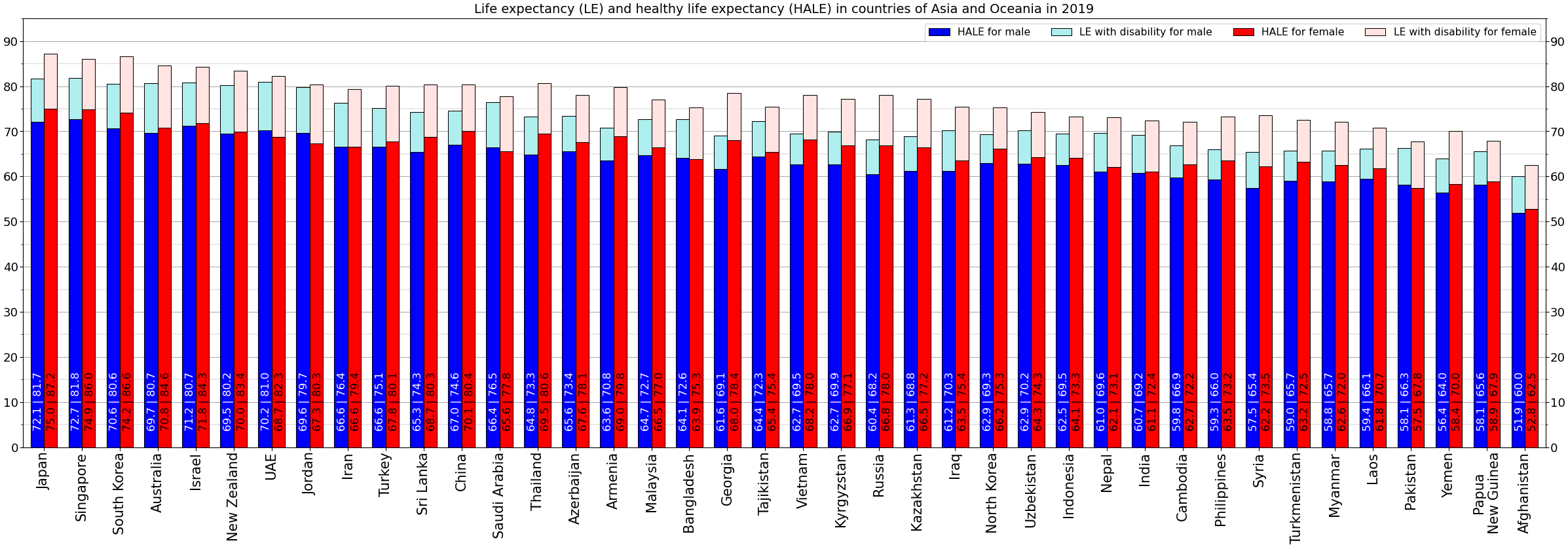
Life expectancy and healthy life expectancy for males and females separately

== See also ==
- List of countries by life expectancy
- List of Oceanian countries by life expectancy
- Demographics of Australia
