= List of resolutions at the sixty-seventh session of the United Nations General Assembly =

This is a list of United Nations General Assembly resolutions at the sixty-seventh session of the United Nations General Assembly.

== Resolutions ==
Resolution	Plenary or Committee	Item number	Date	Topic	Approve/Reject/Abstain	Notes	Resolution document
A/RES/67/1	Plenary	83	24 September 2012	APPROVED Declaration of the High-level Meeting of the General Assembly on the Rule of Law at the National and International Levels	without vote		
A/RES/67/2	Administrative and Budgetary Committee	without vote	11 October 2012	APPROVED Scale of assessments for the apportionment of the expenses of the United Nations: requests under Article 19 of the Charter	without vote	Central African Republic, Comoros, Guinea-Bissau, Sao Tome and Principe and Somalia were allowed to vote despite not paying their annual dues as it was "beyond their means."	
A/RES/67/3	Plenary	85	5 November 2012	APPROVED Report of the International Atomic Energy Agency	without vote	Reaffirms the "indispensable role of IAEA. Indian MP Annu Tandon said that nuclear weapons were still needed despite the Fukushima Daiichi incident, while Singapore urged safety norms. North Korea spoke of the report as "far from" accurate and a failure to tackle the issues of the Korean Peninsula. Its delegate also said the IAEA had "no power" in the North Korean nuclear programme as it was not a party to the NPT nor a member of the agency since the early 1990s. The delegate added that the agency follows the lead of the United States in its partisan policy and was thus not an impartial authority. In its Right of Reply, the delegate then responded to Japan's comment that said North Korea was "a threat to Asia." He rejected the accusation and instead labelled Japan "the source of the threat" as it had the capacity to build nuclear weapons and had secret agreement in 1960 with the United States that would allow nuclear weapons on its soil. He further added that Japan's three non-nuclear principles were false; while he also responded to South Korea saying that North Korea had the right to claim the status of a nuclear weapon state. Japan then responded in saying that it adheres to its three non-nuclear principles without deviation and was determined to see the creation of a nuclear-weapon-free world. The delegate added that Japan's ballistic missile system was purely defensive and not aimed at anyone in particular, while its nuclear energy conformed with IAEA's (whose director is Japanese) norms as "in compliance and peaceful." North Korea than responded again in refuting Japan's statement as a "political cover-up" and cited its territorial claims over the Senkaku Islands as evidence of it seeking "expansionism and militarism." Japan responded for the final time saying that there was no need to repeat what had been said, but that it reserved the right to refute other "groundless allegations" by North Korea at what it deemed an appropriate occasion.	
A/RES/67/4	Plenary	41	13 November 2012	APPROVED Necessity of ending the economic, commercial and financial embargo imposed by the United States of America against Cuba	188/3/2	The 21st consecutive resolution on the matter, urged U.S. President Barack Obama to "act on the right side of history" in lifting the embargo. It also expressed concern about the 1996 Helms-Burton Act that punished other states for trading with Cuba. The motion was introduced by Cuban Foreign Minister Bruno Eduardo Rodriquez Parilla who recalled that following the 2008 United States presidential election, Obama announced "a new beginning with Cuba" but had not shown any such change. The motion was rejected by the United States, Israel and Palau, with the Marshall Islands and Micronesia abstaining. In the Right of Reply, Cuba's representative criticised the United States’ speaker for refusing to budge on Bush-era policies and merely repeating the same content as in the previous year. He also described the wastage of campaign finance during the United States presidential election 2012 and the repression of Occupy Wall Street protesters; he added that the embargo was an act of "genocide," noting the term used in the debate was not rejected by the U.S., and that the U.S. has no moral authority concerning human rights as it partakes in military aggression, forced disappearances, secret prisons and "concentration camps." He further accused the U.S. of lying about its humanitarian aid to Cuba and that the U.S. national Alan Gross was detained because of his subversive activities in trying to overthrow the Cuban government against the constitution of Cuba. Cuba's rights include: access to submarine cables for telecommunications and the purchase of communications equipment; its dance troupes' ability to travel without hindrance.	
A/RES/67/5	Plenary	75	14 November 2012	APPROVED Plenary meetings of the General Assembly on 10 and 11 December 2012 devoted to the consideration of the item entitled "Oceans and the law of the sea" and to the commemoration of the thirtieth anniversary of the opening for signature of the United Nations Convention on the Law of the Sea	without vote		
A/RES/67/5	Plenary	83		APPROVED Declaration of the High-level Meeting of the General Assembly on the Rule of Law at the National and International Levels	without vote	The proposal was submitted by the UNGA president and recalls the high-level meeting on the rule of law during the General debate of the sixty-seventh session of the United Nations General Assembly. The draft resolution of discusses the equality of states and their importance in adhering to the rule of law.	
A/RES/67/6	Plenary	121 (f)	19 November 2012	APPROVED Cooperation between the United Nations and the Collective Security Treaty Organization.	without vote		
A/RES/67/7	Plenary	121 (w)	19 November 2012	APPROVED Cooperation between the United Nations and the Central European Initiative.	without vote		
A/RES/67/8	Plenary	121 (o)	19 November 2012	APPROVED Cooperation between the United Nations and the Organisation for the Prohibition of Chemical Weapons.	without vote		
A/RES/67/9	Plenary	121 (t)	19 November 2012	APPROVED Cooperation between the United Nations and the Preparatory Commission for the Comprehensive Nuclear-Test-Ban Treaty Organization.	without vote		
A/RES/67/10	Plenary	121 (k)	19 November 2012	APPROVED Cooperation between the United Nations and the Eurasian Economic Community.	without vote		
A/RES/67/11	Plenary	121 (n)	19 November 2012	APPROVED Cooperation between the United Nations and the League of Arab States.	without vote		
A/RES/67/12	Plenary	121 (m)	19 November 2012	APPROVED Cooperation between the United Nations and the Latin American and Caribbean Economic System.	without vote		
A/RES/67/13	Plenary	121 (d)	19 November 2012	APPROVED Cooperation between the United Nations and the Black Sea Economic Cooperation Organization.	without vote		
A/RES/67/14	Plenary	121 (j)	19 November 2012	APPROVED Cooperation between the United Nations and the Economic Cooperation Organization.	without vote		
A/RES/67/15	Plenary	121 (u)	19 November 2012	APPROVED Cooperation between the United Nations and the Shanghai Cooperation Organisation.	without vote		
A/RES/67/16	Plenary	38	27 November 2012	APPROVED The situation in Afghanistan.	without vote	Introduced by Germany as sending "a positive signal of sustained support to Afghanistan, its government and its people;" and welcomed aid pledges of US$16 billion at the Tokyo Conference. Afghanistan's representative said that since the War in Afghanistan the country had been a "broken state with an economy in shambles, a shattered infrastructure and a society wearied by years of conflict," but that changes are occurring, including constructions of schools and roads, women's rights and the development of the armed forces. He also commented on the Afghan presidential election, 2014 and the withdrawal of ISAF troops as "a new chapter in Afghanistan is unfolding." He also said he hoped Afghanistan-United States relations will deepen in regards to security as a result of the state of forces agreement and that "a successful transition will allay concerns about the possible vacuum created by the end of the military phase”, and that the long-term economic sustainability of the Afghan State was essential in that regard. Emphasizing that “ Afghanistan’s future is about sustainability. We must not fall behind in our efforts, not even for a moment." Kyrgyzstan spoke on behalf of the Shanghai Cooperation Organisation and supported the changes in Afghanistan. "We must not overlook the difficulties and challenges that Afghanistan is still facing in the course of reconstruction."	
A/RES/67/17	Plenary	12	28 November 2012	APPROVED Sport as a means to promote education, health, development and peace.	without vote	The motion called for the promotion and integration of sport for development and peace in the global development agenda while working with the principles of the United Nations Action Plan on Sport for Development and Peace. Monaco introduced the motion, with its representative, who is the co-president of the Group of Friends of Sport for Development and Peace, saying sport helped to promote the values of social inclusion, gender equality, tolerance and respect for rules and health by exceeding one's own limits.	
A/RES/67/18	Plenary	14	28 November 2012	APPROVED Education for democracy.	without vote	The motion was introduced by Mongolia, which was the former chair of the International Conference on New and Restored Democracies, as well as the incumbent chair of the Community of Democracies, as a means to recognises the importance of education as a key to strengthening democratic institutions, realising human rights and achieving international development goals such as the Millennium Development Goals. It called for the promotion of "peace, human rights, democracy, respect for religious and cultural diversity and justice through education; integrate education for democracy, along with civic education and human rights education, into national education standards." The secetariat announced that there would be no budgetary implication for the resolution, though US$113,200 for the Department for General Assembly and Conference Management would be incurred during the 2014-2015 biennium.	
A/RES/67/19	Plenary	37	29 November 2012	APPROVED Status of Palestine in the United Nations.	138/9/41	The resolution was introduced on the International Day of Solidarity with the Palestinian People, following a day of debate, including by Palestinian Fatah President Mahmoud Abbas with the support of Afghanistan, Algeria, Argentina, Bahrain, Bangladesh, Bolivia, Brazil, Brunei, Chile, China, Comoros, Cuba, North Korea, Djibouti, Ecuador, Egypt, Guinea-Bissau, Guyana, Iceland, India, Indonesia, Iraq, Jordan, Kazakhstan, Kenya, Kuwait, Laos, Lebanon, Libya, Madagascar, Malaysia, Maldives, Mali, Mauritania, Morocco, Namibia, Nicaragua, Nigeria, Oman, Pakistan, Peru, Qatar, Saint Vincent and the Grenadines, Saudi Arabia, Senegal, Seychelles, Sierra Leone, Somalia, South Africa, Sudan, Tajikistan, Tunisia, Turkey, United Arab Emirates, Uruguay, Venezuela, Yemen, Zimbabwe and Palestine The U.K., Germany will abstain from the vote; while notable supporters of the resolution are France, Spain, Norway, Denmark and Switzerland. Member states that voted against the resolution were: Canada, Czech Republic, Israel, Panama, Marshall Islands, Micronesia, Nauru, Palau and the United States. The U.S. also lobbied against the resolution being brought to the UNGA.	
A/RES/67/20	Plenary	37	30 November 2012	Committee on the Exercise of the Inalienable Rights of the Palestinian People.	106/7/56	The resolution was sponsored by: Algeria, Comoros, Cuba, Djibouti, Ecuador, Egypt, Guyana, Indonesia, Iraq, Jordan, Kuwait, Lao People's Democratic Republic, Lebanon, Malaysia, Mali, Malta, Mauritania, Morocco, Namibia, Nicaragua, Oman, Qatar, Saudi Arabia, Senegal, Sierra Leone, Somalia, South Africa, Sudan, Tunisia, United Arab Emirates, Venezuela, Yemen, Zimbabwe and Palestine. Senegal introduced the first four resolutions. Oman expressed concern about the "grave situation" due to the Gaza blockade and about attempts to change the demographics. Syria called for refraining from commenting on the Syrian civil war so as not to distract from the day's agenda; yet many delegation did mention the issue and Japan expressed support for the National Coalition for Syrian Revolutionary and Opposition Forces, while condemning Syria yet calling "on all parties in Syria to immediately halt the violence and human rights abuses." Turkey did the same saying that the situation had crossed national boundaries. Speakers on the question of Palestine included: Norway, Bolivia, North Korea, Argentina, Maldives, Laos, Uruguay, Yemen, Iraq, India, Iceland, Ecuador, Vietnam, Bangladesh, Saudi Arabia, Chile, Qatar, Bahrain and the observer of the Holy See and the League of Arab States. Israel spoke on a point of order and then called for a vote on all six resolutions. Those who opposed the motion were Australia, Canada, Micronesia, Israel, Marshall Islands, Palau and the United States. Singapore spoke after the votes to explain its support for the measure.	
A/RES/67/21	Plenary	37	30 November 2012	Division for Palestinian Rights of the Secretariat.	103/7/61	The resolution was sponsored by: Algeria, Comoros, Cuba, Djibouti, Ecuador, Egypt, Guyana, Indonesia, Iraq, Jordan, Kuwait, Lao People's Democratic Republic, Lebanon, Malaysia, Mali, Malta, Mauritania, Morocco, Namibia, Nicaragua, Oman, Qatar, Saudi Arabia, Senegal, Sierra Leone, Somalia, South Africa, Sudan, Tunisia, United Arab Emirates, Venezuela, Yemen, Zimbabwe and Palestine. Those opposed to the motion were Australia, Canada, Israel, Marshall Islands, Micronesia, Palau and the United States.	
A/RES/67/22	Plenary	37	30 November 2012	Special information programme on the question of Palestine of the Department of Public Information of the Secretariat.	160/7/7	The resolution was sponsored by: Algeria, Comoros, Cuba, Ecuador, Egypt, Guyana, Indonesia, Iraq, Jordan, Kuwait, Lao People's Democratic Republic, Lebanon, Malaysia, Mali, Malta, Mauritania, Morocco, Namibia, Nicaragua, Oman, Qatar, Saudi Arabia, Senegal, Sierra Leone, Somalia, South Africa, Sudan, Tunisia, United Arab Emirates, Venezuela, Yemen, Zimbabwe and Palestine. The motion was opposed by Australia, Canada, Israel, Marshall Islands, Micronesia, Palau and the United States; while seven states abstained: Cameroon, El Salvador, Honduras, Papua New Guinea, Togo, Tonga and Vanuatu.	
A/RES/67/23	Plenary	37	30 November 2012	Peaceful settlement of the question of Palestine.	163/6/5	The resolution was sponsored by: Algeria, Comoros, Cuba, Ecuador, Egypt, Guyana, Indonesia, Iraq, Jordan, Kuwait, Lao People's Democratic Republic, Lebanon, Malaysia, Mali, Malta, Mauritania, Morocco, Namibia, Nicaragua, Oman, Qatar, Saudi Arabia, Senegal, Sierra Leone, Somalia, South Africa, Sudan, Tunisia, United Arab Emirates, Venezuela, Yemen, Zimbabwe and Palestine. The motion was opposed by Canada, Israel, Marshall Islands, Micronesia, Palau and the United States; while five others abstained: Australia, Cameroon, Honduras, Papua New Guinea and Tonga. Palestine then made a general statement saying that the previous day's motion was "historic [for] both the people and the State of Palestine" and those who supported a peaceful resolution to the conflict. Palestine's delegate said: "There is no way for me to describe the enthusiasm that the General Assembly generated yesterday [in listening to President Mahmoud Abbas’ statement]. He also thanked those who supported the motion, adding that it saved the "two-State solution and...peace...the possibility of creating an atmosphere conducive to negotiations with Israel, and to putting an end to the long-standing occupation, as well as establishing the independent Palestinian State." He continued in saying that the Israeli government's reaction was "an immediate provocation. They are trying to provoke us" and that Palestine expected the Security Council to "uphold international law and to bring Israel into compliance" in accusing Israel of "unilaterally creating illegal facts on the ground [by contravening international law]." He concluded that though Palestine would work towards peace, their resolve and determination "had limits" and were being tested; also saying the choice was Israel's to continue the peace process in good faith just as Abbas’ message the previous day had made "crystal clear" and that one day perhaps Palestine could be a full member of the body as "the overwhelming vote yesterday had sent a “massive message to the Security Council" and that the flag of Palestine should be put in the alphabetical order outside the headquarters of the United Nations "in order to open a new chapter."	
A/RES/67/24	Plenary	36	30 November 2012	Jerusalem.	162/6/7	Egypt introduced the next two resolutions after congratulating Palestine's entry as a non-member observer state. Speakers on the Middle East issues included: Cuba, Malaysia, Pakistan, China, Iran and Indonesia. China also mentioned the right to territorial integrity for Lebanon as well, even though the Shebaa Farms was not up for a vote. The motion was opposed by Canada, Israel, Marshall Islands, Micronesia, Nauru, Palau and the United States; while six states abstained: Cameroon, Panama, Papua New Guinea, Togo, Tonga and Vanuatu.	
A/RES/67/25	Plenary	36	30 November 2012	The Syrian Golan.	110/6/59	The motion was opposed by Canada, Israel, Marshall Islands, Federated States of Micronesia, Palau and the United States. Syria then spoke again saying it was "regrettable that certain countries," who rhetorically call for human rights to be adhered to, impose sanctions on Syria while not supporting resolutions that call for an end to the "Israeli occupation of Syria’s territory in the Golan [Heights]." He called this "political hypocrisy" and that the bias toward Israel was their "twisted logic." The said countries prolonged the occupation and thus "bore the consequences of the Syrian occupied Golan." In explaining its vote, Brazil, also speaking for Argentina, said they had supported the measure due to the United Nations Charter's prohibition against the threat or use of force against the territorial integrity of other states and there was a need to make progress, including the renewal of negotiations.	
A/67/401	Disarmament and International Security		3 December 2012	CONSIDERS Reduction of military budgets.		Introduced as first action of the day by Committee Rapporteur Norway; however, no proposal was suggested.	
A/RES/67/26	Disarmament and International Security	87	3 December 2012	African Nuclear-Weapon-Free Zone Treaty.	without vote	Calls on African countries not yet a signatory to the treaty to accede to it and to ensure a quick adherence to the treaty under protocol III. It also calls for states not party to the Nuclear Non-Proliferation Treaty (NPT) to do so in order to have comprehensive safeguards agreements with the International Atomic Energy Agency (IAEA).	
A/67/401	Disarmament and International Security		3 December 2012	CONSIDERS Maintenance of international security — good neighbourliness, stability and development in South-Eastern Europe.	without vote	Agreed to put this as a provisional agenda item for the sixty-ninth session of the United Nations General Assembly.	
A/RES/67/27	Disarmament and International Security	89	3 December 2012	APPROVED Developments in the field of information and telecommunication in the context of international security.	without vote	The report's draft resolution called on member states to promote in multilevel fora the consideration of existing and potential threats to information security and how to tackle them, while allowing for the free flow of information.	
A/RES/67/28	Disarmament and International Security	90	3 December 2012	APPROVED Establishment of a nuclear-weapon- free zone in the region of the Middle East.	without vote	The report's draft resolution called on directly concerned partines to take "practical and urgent" steps towards a regional zone with nuclear weapons, to adhere to the NPT, allow the IAEA to supervise all nuclear activities and refrain from developing, producing, testing or acquiring nuclear weapons, as well as forbidding the placement of nuclear arsenal on their territories or territories they control. After the vote, Israel said joined the consensus albeit with reservations on such wordings of the resolution as IAEA-supervised safeguards as such matters of regional security need to be resolved within regional contexts and "pragmatic, realistic and step-by-step approach[es]." The previous mechanism for regional dialogue in 1990s was not present anymore and thus not conducive to confidence building measures to defuse tension. It also added that Israel's existence was called into question, without naming any states, through alleged calls to wipe off the map and non recognition of its "right to exist." The delegate said "only direct dialogue could move us to regional security," while he hoped for democracy in the Arab World.	
A/RES/67/29	Disarmament and International Security	90	3 December 2012	APPROVED Conclusion of effective international arrangements to assure non-nuclear-weapon States against the use or threat of use of nuclear weapons .	126/0/57	Called for an "urgent need to reach an early agreement" against such threats or actions. It noted an appeal to all states, with special mentions of nuclear weapons states, to come to such an agreement on a common approach and formula that would become a legally binding treaty. It recommended the Conference on Disarmament actively pursue these ends.	
A/RES/67/78			10 December 2012	Oceans and the Law of the Sea.			
	Social, Humanitarian and Cultural Affairs Committee		December 2012	Ending female genital mutilation.		The Third Committee passed a draft resolution on the matter on 28 November,	
