= Thematic debate on the role of international criminal justice in reconciliation =

Thematic debate of the sixty-seventh session of the United Nations General Assembly "Role of international criminal justice in reconciliation"
- Host country: United Nations
- Date: April 10, 2013
- Cities: New York City
- Venues: United Nations Headquarters

The thematic debate on the role of international criminal justice in reconciliation is an interactive thematic public debate convened on 10 April 2013 by Vuk Jeremić, President of the United Nations General Assembly (UNGA) during the assembly's 67th session. The debate was organized after the conclusion of the Trial of Gotovina et al at the ICTY in which the court acquitted two defendants charged with war crimes against Serbs in Croatia. Some countries, notably the United States and Croatia, refused to participate in the debate and some of the invited participants, such as the president of the ICTY, cancelled their participation.

== Organization of the debate ==
This debate was one of interactive thematic public debates convened on 10 April 2013 by the President of the General Assembly during the resumed part of the UNGA's 67th session. It was scheduled after Gotovina and Markač were acquitted of the war crimes by the ICTY in November 2012. Jeremić stated that there was a strong pressure to cancel the debate and concluded that the boycott was not successful.

== Participants ==
Theodor Meron announced that all three Hague war-crimes courts turned down the invitation of the UNGA president for participation in the debate about their work. The president of the General Assembly described the refusal of the ICTY president to participate in this debate as scandalous.

The debate had two sessions, first participated by the representatives of countries and second by NGOs and notable experts. Experts who participated in the debate included Lewis Mackenzie, Savo Štrbac, Matthew Parish, John Laughland, William Schabas, Charles Jalloh and John Ciorciari.

The Secretary-General of the United Nations Ban Ki-moon was one of the participants in the debate. More than 80 countries participated in the debate which was the highest number in the history of UN public debates.

The delegation of the Presidency of Bosnia and Herzegovina was led by Nebojša Radmanović. The president of Croatia Ivo Josipović had emphasized that he would not attend nor participate in the debate.

== Debate ==
The debate was opened by Vuk Jeremić who underlined that in the UN no topic should be forbidden.

The first participant in the debate was Tomislav Nikolić, the president of Serbia. He criticized the work of ICTY emphasizing that it did not contribute but hindered the reconciliation in former Yugoslavia. He reminded that, although there is no significant ethnic disproportion among the number of casualties in the Yugoslav wars, the ICTY sentenced Serbs to 1,150 years in prison while members of other ethnic groups are sentenced to 55 totally for crimes against Serbs. Vitaly Churkin, the ambassador of Russia to the UN, also criticized the work of the ICTY, especially acquittals of Gotovina and Ramush Haradinaj. He emphasized that in this cases the justice has not been satisfied because in this cases nobody was convicted for evident crimes.

An incident happened during the speech of Tomislav Nikolić when Munira Subašić, president of "Mothers of Srebrenica" organization, was dismissed from the hall after she revealed a shirt with an inscription against the Republic of Srpska.

== Reactions ==
Judge Theodor Meron of the ICTY at the time of this debate, criticized this debate and argued that "Acquittals, just as convictions, show the health of the system." Richard Dicker of Human Rights Watch stated that debate is a revisionist denial of the war crimes committed during the Yugoslav Wars. United States, Canada and Jordan boycotted the debate while the critics of the debate asserted that it was an attempt to discredit the ICTY. The president of the UNGA Vuk Jeremić replied that he does not shy away from criticizing the ICTY which has "convicted nobody for inciting crimes committed against Serbs in Croatia."
