= United Nations General Assembly resolution 67/19 =

2012 resolution concerning Palestine

UN General Assembly Resolution 67/19
- Palestine In favour Against Abstentions Absent Non-members
- Date: 29 November 2012
- Meeting no.: 44th Plenary
- Code: A/RES/67/19 (Document)
- Subject: Status of Palestine in the United Nations
- Voting summary: 138 voted for; 9 voted against; 41 abstained; 5 absent
- Result: Adopted

United Nations General Assembly resolution 67/19 was a resolution accepting Palestine as a non-member observer state in the United Nations General Assembly. It was adopted by the sixty-seventh session of the United Nations General Assembly on 29 November 2012, the date of the International Day of Solidarity with the Palestinian People and the 65th anniversary of the adoption by the General Assembly of Resolution 181(II) on the future government of Palestine. The draft resolution was proposed by Palestine's representative at the United Nations. It, however, maintains the status of the Palestine Liberation Organization as the representative of the Palestinian people within the United Nations System. Though strongly contested by the United States and the government of Israel, former Israeli prime minister Ehud Olmert expressed support for the measure. The motion was seen as largely symbolic, though it could allow Palestine to start proceedings at the International Criminal Court against Israel. Its timing, following a year in which Palestine obtained membership of UNESCO and the UN Security Council was unable "to make a unanimous recommendation" on their application for full UN membership, and coming several days after the completion of Operation Pillar of Defense, was also noted. The new status equates Palestine with that of the Holy See within the United Nations System and implicitly recognises Palestinian sovereignty.

== Background ==
On 22 November 1974, the United Nations General Assembly adopted resolution 3237, inviting the Palestine Liberation Organization to participate at UNGA sessions in the capacity of an observer entity. The resolution also invited the PLO to participate in the work of all international conferences convened under the auspices of the UNGA and other organs of the United Nations.

In resolution 43/177 of 15 December 1988, the UNGA acknowledged the proclamation of the state of Palestine by the Palestine National Council on 15 November 1988. The resolution also decided that, effective as of 15 December 1988, the designation "Palestine" should be used in place of the designation "Palestine Liberation Organization" in the United Nations system.

In 2011, at the sixty-sixth session of the United Nations General Assembly Fatah's Palestinian President Mahmoud Abbas asked to join as a full member of the United Nations. According to the United Nations Charter II: Article 4

- "Membership in the United Nations is open to all other peace-loving states which accept the obligations contained in the present Charter and, in the judgment of the Organization, are able and willing to carry out these obligations.
- The admission of any such state to membership in the United Nations will be effected by a decision of the General Assembly upon the recommendation of the Security Council."

However, the Palestine 194 initiative never went to a vote in the United Nations Security Council. Only eight of fifteen members had supported the measure, one less than the affirmative majority vote of nine members, including the concurring votes of the permanent members, required by Article 27 of the UN Charter. Furthermore, the United States indicated an intention to veto the resolution should it come to a vote. On 31 October 2011, the General Conference of the United Nations Educational, Scientific and Cultural Organization (UNESCO) admitted Palestine as a member state. The decision took effect on 23 November 2011 when Palestine ratified the UNESCO constitution.

== Content ==
The objective of the resolution is to accord an upgraded status to the Palestinian delegation and recognise its boundaries as they were prior to 1967:

...stress the need for the withdrawal of Israel from the Palestinian territory occupied since 1967, including East Jerusalem...and the complete cessation of all Israeli settlement activities in the Occupied Palestinian Territory, including East Jerusalem

— Recital 9

Reaffirms the right of the Palestinian people to self-determination and to independence in their State of Palestine on the Palestinian territory occupied since 1967

— United Nations General Assembly resolution 67/19, Point 1

To accord an upgraded status to the Palestinian delegation:

Decides to accord to Palestine non-member observer State status in the United Nations, without prejudice to the acquired rights, privileges and role of the Palestine Liberation Organization in the United Nations as the representative of the Palestinian people, in accordance with the relevant resolutions and practice

— United Nations General Assembly resolution 67/19, Point 2

That Jerusalem should be the capital of both Israel and Palestine:

...emphasizing the need for a way to be found through negotiations to resolve the status of Jerusalem as the capital of two States

— Recital 10

The reference "Palestine" is to the PLO, that up to this point had the status of UN non-state observer entity:

...the designation 'Palestine' should be used in place of the designation 'Palestine Liberation Organization' in the United Nations system, without prejudice to the observer status and functions of the Palestine Liberation Organization within the United Nations system

— United Nations General Assembly resolution 67/19, Recital 14

Effectively the UN observer mission of the PLO is changed into UN observer mission of the State of Palestine, whose government is identified in next recital:

Taking into consideration that the Executive Committee of the Palestine Liberation Organization, in accordance with a decision by the Palestine National Council, is entrusted with the powers and responsibilities of the Provisional Government of the State of Palestine

— United Nations General Assembly resolution 67/19, Recital 15

=== Other operative provisions ===
The General Assembly...

1. ...

2. ...

3. Expresses the hope that the Security Council will consider favourably the application submitted on 23 September 2011 by the State of Palestine for admission to full membership in the United Nations;

4. Affirms its determination to contribute to the achievement of the inalienable rights of the Palestinian people and the attainment of a peaceful settlement in the Middle East that ends the occupation that began in 1967 and fulfills the vision of two States: an independent, sovereign, democratic, contiguous and viable State of Palestine living side by side in peace and security with Israel on the basis of the pre-1967 borders;

5. Expresses the urgent need for the resumption and acceleration of negotiations within the Middle East peace process based on the relevant United Nations resolutions, the terms of reference of the Madrid Conference, including the principle of land for peace, the Arab Peace Initiative and the Quartet road map to a permanent two-State solution to the Israeli–Palestinian conflict for the achievement of a just, lasting and comprehensive peace settlement between the Palestinian and Israeli sides that resolves all outstanding core issues, namely the Palestine refugees, Jerusalem, settlements, borders, security and water;

6. Urges all States, the specialized agencies and organizations of the United Nations system to continue to support and assist the Palestinian people in the early realization of their right to self-determination, independence and freedom;

7. Requests the Secretary-General to take the necessary measures to implement the present resolution and to report to the Assembly within three months on progress made in this regard.

— Operative provisions

== Campaign ==
PLO Executive Committee member Hanan Ashrawi said: "Israel, the United States and a handful of countries are on the wrong side of morality, the wrong side of justice and the wrong side of the law. [The UN vote would] begin a process of historical redemption and healing in Palestine." Hamas also backed the motion.

Israeli Prime Minister Benjamin Netanyahu said that resolution would make the goal of a state of Palestine "more distant. Peace is only achieved through negotiations, not by unilateral declarations." He told the Menachem Begin Heritage Center: "The Palestinians must recognize the Jewish state, and they must be prepared to end the conflict with Israel once and for all. None of these vital interests, these vital interests of peace, none of them appear in the resolution that will be put forward before the General Assembly today, and that is why Israel cannot accept it." These words were echoed by Ambassador Ron Prosor. Foreign Ministry spokesman Yigal Palmor said Israeli reaction would be measured by Palestine's reaction to the vote.

The United States lobbied against the resolution being brought to the UNGA, while Foreign Minister Avigdor Lieberman said that it was only exacerbating the situation and that a vote would trigger "an extreme response from us." However, following Operation Pillar of Defense, and under pressure from the United States, Israel stopped its threats of punishment to Abbas for going ahead with the move to the UN. Lieberman also went to New York City to meet Secretary-General Ban Ki-moon, while Ambassador Ron Prosor was scheduled to speak after Abbas. Israeli former Prime Minister Ehud Olmert wrote: "I believe that the Palestinian request from the United Nations is congruent with the basic concept of the two-state solution. Therefore, I see no reason to oppose it. Once the United Nations will lay the foundation for this idea, we in Israel will have to engage in a serious process of negotiations, in order to agree on specific borders based on the 1967 lines, and resolve the other issues. It is time to give a hand to, and encourage, the moderate forces amongst the Palestinians. Abu-Mazen [sic] (Mahmoud Abbas) and Salam Fayyad need our help. It's time to give it." There was a rally in support of the Palestinian bid in Tel Aviv's Rothschild Boulevard, which was organised by Gush Shalom, Peace Now, Hadash and Meretz. Former Foreign Ministry director Dr. Alon Liel said: "As of today there is a Palestinian state. As of today we no longer control the life of a nation but the life of a separate state." Former Meretz MK Mossi Raz said: "We call on Lieberman and Netanyahu: It's not too late. Order the ambassador to say 'Israel yes.'" Arab-Israeli singer Mira Awad also performed at the rally and said that she was "happy with Abbas' bid and very sad about the inexplicable refusal to finally give the Palestinian people a chance to move forward." Australian Prime Minister Julia Gillard was criticised by Jewish groups for not rejecting the motion; she had initially wished to vote against the measure, but abstained instead due to opposition from her own cabinet and caucus. Netanyahu later downplayed the importance of the vote in saying that "the decision at the United Nations will change nothing on the ground. It will not advance the establishment of a Palestinian state. It will delay it further. No matter how many hands are raised against us there is no power on earth that will cause me to compromise on Israel's security."

U.S. State Department spokesperson Victoria Nuland said: "The resolution does nothing to get them (Palestinians) closer to statehood, and it may actually make the environment more difficult." She also said that Deputy Secretary of State Bill Burns and U.S. Special Envoy for Middle East Peace David Hale met Abbas and told him of the U.S.' "very real concern" about the initiative. "We've been clear, we've been consistent with the Palestinians that we oppose observer state status in the General Assembly and this resolution. And the Deputy Secretary also reiterated that no one should be under any illusion that this resolution is going to produce the results that the Palestinians claim to seek, namely to have their own state living in peace next to Israel." U.S. Secretary of State Hillary Clinton and Republican Senator Orrin Hatch warned against the draft resolution, with Hatch introducing a motion to cut off financing to the UN if it passes.

Germany's Foreign Minister Guido Westerwelle added that "the decisive steps" towards practical statehood needed negotiations between Israelis and Palestinians. "In our view there are doubts over whether the desired move by the Palestinians today is supportive for the peace process. We fear it could lead rather to a hardening of views." Indian Ambassador Hardeep Singh Puri said "if there is a poor turnout, a poor vote, the radicals gain," in expecting a high turnout to bolster Abbas' standing.

== Motion ==
The motion was proposed by Palestine's representative at the UN; By virtue of Article 18 of the UN Charter, the decision to approve the motion could be made by a majority of the members of the General Assembly present and voting. The motion was co-sponsored following a day of debate on 29 November 2012, including by Mahmoud Abbas, with the support of 58 countries. Prior to the actual vote, 11 more states added their names to list of co-sponsors. The United Kingdom said it would only support the motion on assurances of unconditional talk on final status issues. Meanwhile, the Czech Republic opposed the measure.

=== Debate ===
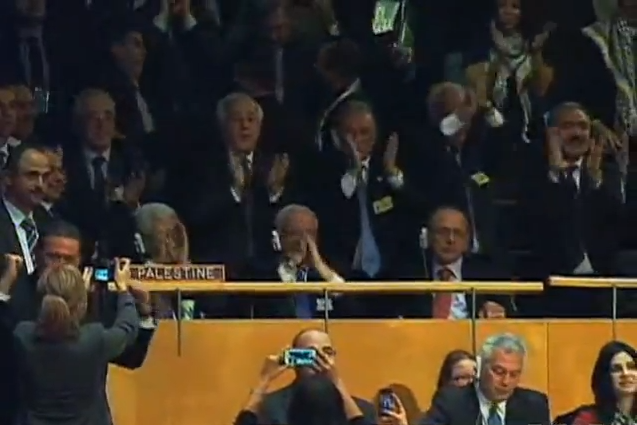
UN delegates applaud after United Nations General Assembly resolution 67/19 is passed

The President of the General Assembly Vuk Jeremić opened the day's debate in saying the vote "would achieve what was envisaged in 1947, a two-state solution" and expressed hope of a return to bilateral negotiations. Secretary-General Ban Ki-moon said before the vote that the odds of a "two-state solution seems ever more distant" and that "leaders must show a sense of historic responsibility and vision. Israelis and Palestinians must break out of a zero-sum mentality and embrace a peaceful path forward."

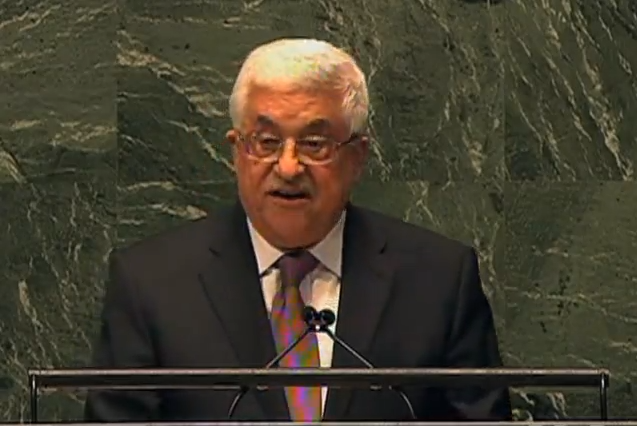
Palestinian President Mahmoud Abbas speaks from the podium of the UNGA Chamber during the debate portion prior to the voting for the resolution.

Sudan introduced the bill. Other speakers included Palestine's Mahmoud Abbas, Israel's Ron Prosor, Indonesia's Marty Natalegawa, Canada's John Baird, Turkey's Ahmet Davutoglu and 67th UNGA President Vuk Jeremić.

Abbas told the delegates "to issue a birth certificate of the reality of the State of Palestine." He denounced the Operation Pillar of Defense, for the death toll of Palestinians and the infrastructure damage it wrought in Gaza; described the establishment of Israel as a nakba and a modern ethnic cleansing; and rebuked Israel for failing to "save the peace process," and said Israeli military strikes and settler attacks were an Israeli effort to colonise Palestine. He added that the Palestinian delegation did not seek to delegitimise "a country created here many years ago," but to save the peace process and that the Palestinians would not accept anything less than independence and sovereignty, with East Jerusalem as the national capital, all pre-1967 territories and a right of return for refugees.

=== Result ===
Vote	Quantity	States
Approve	138	Afghanistan, Algeria, Angola, Antigua and Barbuda, Argentina, Armenia, Austria, Azerbaijan, Bahrain, Bangladesh, Belarus, Belgium, Belize, Benin, Bhutan, Bolivia, Botswana, Brazil, Brunei, Burkina Faso, Burundi, Cambodia, Cape Verde, Central African Republic, Chad, Chile, China, Comoros, Republic of the Congo, Costa Rica, Côte d'Ivoire, Cuba, Cyprus, Denmark, Djibouti, Dominica, Dominican Republic, Ecuador, Egypt, El Salvador, Eritrea, Eswatini, Ethiopia, Finland, France, Gabon, Gambia, Georgia, Ghana, Greece, Grenada, Guinea, Guinea-Bissau, Guyana, Honduras, Iceland, India, Indonesia, Iran, Iraq, Ireland, Italy, Jamaica, Japan, Jordan, Kazakhstan, Kenya, North Korea, Kuwait, Kyrgyzstan, Laos, Lebanon, Lesotho, Libya, Liechtenstein, Luxembourg, Malaysia, Maldives, Mali, Malta, Mauritania, Mauritius, Mexico, Morocco, Mozambique, Myanmar, Namibia, Nepal, New Zealand, Nicaragua, Niger, Nigeria, Norway, Oman, Pakistan, Peru, Philippines, Portugal, Qatar, Russia, Saint Kitts and Nevis, Saint Lucia, Saint Vincent and the Grenadines, São Tomé and Príncipe, Saudi Arabia, Senegal, Serbia, Seychelles, Sierra Leone, Solomon Islands, Somalia, South Africa, South Sudan, Spain, Sri Lanka, Sudan, Suriname, Sweden, Switzerland, Syria, Tajikistan, Tanzania, Thailand, Timor-Leste, Trinidad and Tobago, Tunisia, Turkey, Turkmenistan, Tuvalu, Uganda, United Arab Emirates, Uruguay, Uzbekistan, Venezuela, Vietnam, Yemen, Zambia and Zimbabwe.
Reject	9	Canada, Czech Republic, Micronesia, Israel, Marshall Islands, Nauru, Palau, Panama and United States of America.
Abstain	41	Albania, Andorra, Australia, Bahamas, Barbados, Bosnia and Herzegovina, Bulgaria, Cameroon, Colombia, Croatia, Democratic Republic of the Congo, Estonia, Fiji, Germany, Guatemala, Haiti, Hungary, Latvia, Lithuania, North Macedonia, Malawi, Moldova, Monaco, Mongolia, Montenegro, Netherlands, Papua New Guinea, Paraguay, Poland, Romania, Rwanda, Samoa, San Marino, Singapore, Slovakia, Slovenia, South Korea, Togo, Tonga, United Kingdom and Vanuatu.
Absent	5	Equatorial Guinea, Kiribati, Liberia, Madagascar and Ukraine.

Following the debate from UN ambassadors and state leaders, a vote was held in the United Nations General Assembly Chamber at about 17:00. After the resolution was adopted, Turkish Foreign Minister Ahmet Davutoglu went up and gave Abbas a hug. Secretary-General Ban Ki-moon then briefly spoke, and said: "There can be no substitute for negotiations. I call on all those concerned to act responsibly [and intensify efforts towards reconciliation and towards a just and lasting peace]; while President Vuk Jeremic added: "What happens between the River Jordan and the shores of the Mediterranean has become the key to the security and well-being of [all] mankind [a]nd so we still witness...enmity, estrangement, and mistrust—as parents continue to bury their children." Palestinian Authority Foreign Minister Riyad al-Malki added: "We are humbled by this historic support."

Several states then spoke from their seats to explain their vote: United States, France, Singapore, United Kingdom, Germany, Switzerland, Belgium, Bulgaria, Serbia, Honduras, Denmark, Italy, Greece, Hungary, Czech Republic, Finland, Australia, New Zealand, Norway, Tanzania, South Sudan, Netherlands, Japan, Costa Rica, Guatemala, Spain, Mexico, Georgia, Jamaica, Russia (called for restraint in reactions), Papua New Guinea, South Korea, Romania, Portugal, Mauritius. Other states continued to speak from the podium on the "question of Palestine": Egypt, Iran (on behalf of the Non Aligned Movement), the European Union (whose statement was adhered to by other European countries not in the EU), Djibouti (on behalf of the Organisation of Islamic Cooperation), China, Kuwait, Nigeria, South Africa, the UAE, Brazil, Cuba, Venezuela, Malaysia, Syria, Morocco, Tunisia and Namibia. Other matters on the "question of Palestine" were discussed the next day as well.

== Reactions ==
=== Palestinian ===
There were celebrations in the West Bank and led Gaza Strip with people waving the Fatah and Hamas flags, respectively. Palestinian Prime Minister Salam Fayyad said after the vote, for which he was in New York: "The question is, where do we go from here and what does it mean? The sooner the tough rhetoric of this can subside and the more this is viewed as a logical consequence of many years of failure to move the process forward, the better;" while he also called for more U.S. involvement in the peace process. PLO Executive Committee member Saeb Erekat added: "Life will not be the same [because] Palestine will become a country under occupation. The terms of reference for any negotiations become withdrawal."

Hamas Gaza-based spokesman, Salah al-Bardaweel, reacted to Abbas' speech in saying: "There are controversial issues in the points that Abbas raised, and Hamas has the right to preserve its position over them. We do not recognise Israel, nor the partition of Palestine, and Israel has no right in Palestine. Getting our membership in the U.N. bodies is our natural right, but without giving up any inch of Palestine’s soil." Party leader Khaled Mashal called for a national unity government through a new P.L.O. election so as to renew the mandate and legitimacy of the organisation "on a correct basis that includes all Palestinian forces." Similarly, The New York Times quoted an unnamed affiliate of the P.L.O. as suggesting a possible leadership role for Mashal in the organisation following a nomination by Abbas or a Palestine Central Council election.

The next day, during debate and voting for other Middle East resolutions, Palestine's delegate said: "There is no way for me to describe the enthusiasm that the General Assembly generated yesterday [in listening to President Mahmoud Abbas' statement]. He also thanked those who supported the motion, adding that it saved the "two-State solution and...peace...the possibility of creating an atmosphere conducive to negotiations with Israel, and to putting an end to the long-standing occupation, as well as establishing the independent Palestinian State." He continued in saying that the Israeli government's reaction — rebuked by the UN — was "an immediate provocation. They are trying to provoke us" and that Palestine expected the Security Council to "uphold international law and to bring Israel into compliance" in accusing Israel of "unilaterally creating illegal facts on the ground [by contravening international law]." He concluded that though Palestine would work towards peace, their resolve and determination "had limits" and were being tested; also saying the choice was Israel’s to continue the peace process in good faith just as Abbas' message the previous day had made "crystal clear" and that one day perhaps Palestine could be a full member of the body as "the overwhelming vote yesterday had sent a "massive message to the Security Council" and that the flag of Palestine should be put in the alphabetical order outside the headquarters of the United Nations "in order to open a new chapter."

=== Israeli ===
Israeli Prime Minister Benjamin Netanyahu responded to the debate, in particular Abbas' speech, in saying: "The world watched a defamatory and venomous speech that was full of mendacious propaganda against the Israel Defense Forces and the citizens of Israel. Someone who wants peace does not talk in such a manner. The way to peace between Jerusalem and Ramallah [sic] is in direct negotiations, without preconditions, and not in one-sided U.N. decisions. By going to the U.N., the Palestinians have violated the agreements with Israel and Israel will act accordingly." Israeli critics of the resolution, said it enshrined the principle of a Palestinian state based on the pre-1967 borders, a position rejected by the Israeli government, while upholding the Palestinian claim for refugees' right of return. An unnamed official said: "They got a state without end of conflict. This sets new terms of reference that will never allow negotiations to start. " Ynetnews suggested Netanyahu and Israel would accept the resolution in return for U.S. support in regards to joint opposition to the Iranian nuclear programme.

In response to the Palestinian move at the UN, Israel authorised the construction of 3,000 more housing units in a Palestinian area of East Jerusalem and the West Bank, In addition, planning will be furthered for the area, known administratively as the E1 Plan. Israeli Finance Minister Yuval Steinitz stated that the tax payments collected on behalf of the Palestinian Authority that month would be used to offset what he said was Palestinian debt to the Israel Electric Corporation. In protest at Israeli settlement development, Spain, the United Kingdom, France, Sweden and Denmark summoned the Israeli ambassador and Germany, Italy and Russia criticised the move; meanwhile Mayor of Chicago Rahm Emanuel, and U.S. President Barack Obama's former chief of staff, described the behaviour of Benjamin Netanyahu as "unfathomable". MKs Michael Ben-Ari and Aryeh Eldad called for the public burnings of Palestinian flags in response to the passage of the resolution, but were prevented from doing so by the Israeli police.

Former UN ambassador Yoram Ettinger called the resolution a "violation of the 1993 Oslo Accords", and that Israel should embrace the former Supreme Court Justice Edmund Levy's Levy Report, which asserted that the West Bank was not "occupied territory" since no foreign entity was sovereign in the area in 1967.

Netanyahu visited Prague, Czech Republic where he told his counterpart Petr Nečas: "Thank you for your country’s opposition to the one-sided resolution at the United Nations; thank you for your friendship; thank you for your courage. On 2 December 2012, Netanyahu also thanked Canadian Prime Minister Stephen Harper saying that he had "thanked Canada for its friendship and principled position this week at the UN."

=== UN ===
Immediately after the UNGA vote, UN officials still opposed Palestinian efforts to independently change "Palestine" to "State of Palestine" in the formal name of their permanent observer mission. When they saw that the sign on the Palestinian delegation's bench in the General Assembly Hall that used to say "Palestine" had been replaced with a sign reading "State of Palestine," they called for the new sign be replaced with the old one, stating that as long as Palestine is merely a non-member state, it cannot independently ask for its name to be changed on the sign on its bench.

Riyad Mansour, the head of the Palestinian UN observer mission, then wrote a letter requesting the name change on 12 December. On 17 December, the UN head of official protocol, Yeocheol Yoon, replied that the request is accepted, and that henceforth the designation of "State of Palestine" shall be used by the Secretariat in all official United Nations documents and the title of the Palestinian mission. The designation is now on all nameplates at the UN, and will appear in activities related to the UN, such as international conferences.

=== Others ===
U.S. Senator Lindsey Graham (R-SC) said the motion was "an unhealthy step that could undermine the peace process" and added that should the Palestinian leadership use the move to prosecute Israelis at the International Criminal Court (ICC) he would, together with Charles E. Schumer and others, introduce legislation to stop financial aid to the PA and close the Palestine Liberation Organization’s office in Washington D.C. Canada's John Baird accused the UN of abandoning unnamed principles in recognising Palestine. Time equated the measure with the ability to join such international organisations as the ICC and speculated Palestine could make Israel accountable in accordance with international law. Hussein Ibish, a senior research fellow at the American Task Force on Palestine, mentioned that the terminology that was usually used regarding the Palestinian United Nations application was that the Palestinians seek recognition from the United Nations, which he claims is meaningless. He wrote that: "The United Nations doesn't recognise states; states recognise each other. The United Nations has member states".

== See also ==
- United Nations General Assembly Resolution 43/177
- International recognition of Palestine
- 2013 Israeli legislative election
- Palestinian territories
- United Nations General Assembly observer entities
