= General debate of the sixty-seventh session of the United Nations General Assembly =

United Nations General Debate Assembly

General Debate of the sixty-seventh session of the United Nations General Assembly
- 25 September – 1 October 2012 67th session 67th general debate

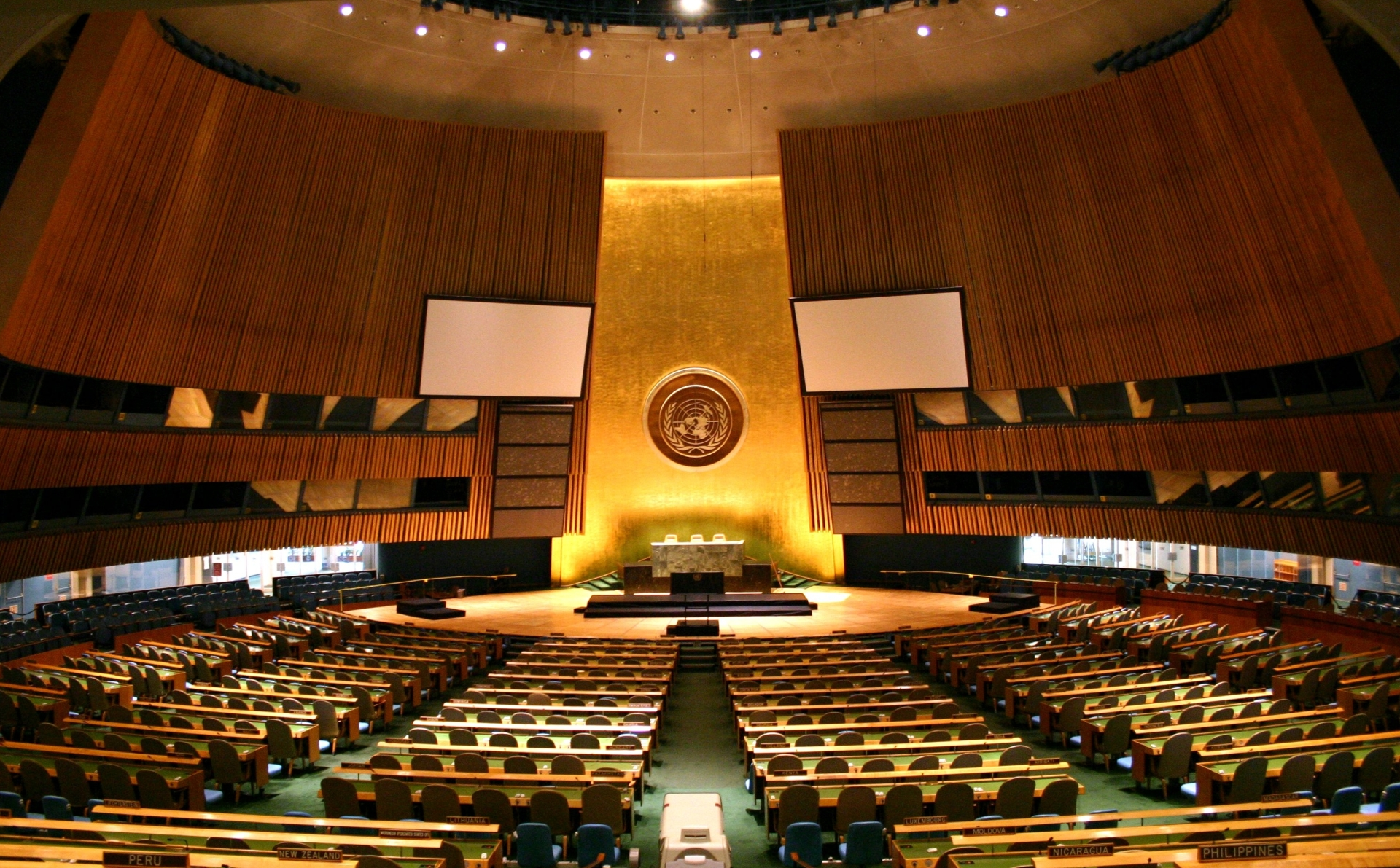
- General Assembly Hall at United Nations Headquarters, New York City
- Host country: United Nations
- Cities: New York City, United States
- Venues: General Assembly Hall at the United Nations Headquarters
- Participants: United Nations Member States
- President: Vuk Jeremić
- Secretary-General: Ban Ki-moon
- Website: gadebate.un.org/en/sessions-archive/67

The general debate of the sixty-seventh session of the United Nations General Assembly was the first debate of the 67th session of the United Nations General Assembly that ran from 25 September – 1 October 2012. Leaders from the United Nations' member states addressed the General Assembly concerning topics of national, regional and international importance.

== Organisation ==
The speaking order of the general debate is different from the speaking order of other General Assembly debates. For the general debate, the Secretary-General speaks first, delivering their "Report of the Secretary-General on the work of the Organization, " they are then followed by: the President of the General Assembly who opens the general debate, the delegate from Brazil and the delegate from the United States of America. After this, the order is first given to Member States, then Observer States and supranational bodies. For all other Member States, speaking order is based on their level of representation at the general debate, order of preference and other criteria such as geographic balance.

According to the rules in place for the general debate, statements should be made in one of the United Nations' official languages of Arabic, Chinese, English, French, Russian or Spanish, and are translated by United Nations translators. Additionally, speakers are usually limited to a 15-minute time limit in order to comply with the schedule set up by the General Committee. Member States are also advised to provide 350 paper copies of their statements in order for them to be distributed to other Member States, as well as to translation services.

The theme for the 67th Session was chosen by General Assembly President Vuk Jeremić as: "Bringing about adjustment or settlement of international disputes or situations by peaceful means." The theme of a Session is typically suggested by the President-elect of the General Assembly prior to their inauguration and the beginning of the Session, and is decided upon via informal discussions with Member States, the current President of the General Assembly and the Secretary-General. This theme is then communicated to Member States in a letter, whereupon the Member States are invited to focus their general debate speeches on the proposed theme.

== Speaking schedule ==
=== 25 September 2012 ===
Morning schedule

- United Nations – Secretary-General Ban Ki-moon (Report of the Secretary-General on the work of the Organization)
- United Nations – President of the 67th session Vuk Jeremić (Opening)
- Brazil – President Dilma Rousseff
- United States of America – President Barack Obama
- Serbia – President Tomislav Nikolić
- Benin – President Boni Yayi
- Finland – President Sauli Niinistö
- Cyprus – President Demetris Christofias
- Qatar – Emir Hamad bin Khalifa Al Thani
- Bulgaria – President Rosen Plevneliev
- Indonesia – President Susilo Bambang Yudhoyono
- Georgia – President Mikheil Saakashvili
- Dominican Republic – President Danilo Medina Sánchez
- France – President François Hollande
- Lithuania – President Dalia Grybauskaitė
- Honduras – President Porfirio Lobo Sosa
- Namibia – President Hifikepunye Pohamba

Afternoon schedule

- Rwanda – President Paul Kagame
- Switzerland – President Eveline Widmer-Schlumpf
- Argentina – President Cristina Fernández
- Senegal – President Macky Sall
- South Africa – President Jacob Zuma
- Panama – President Ricardo Martinelli Berrocal
- Jordan – King Abdullah II Bin Al Hussein
- Hungary – President János Áder
- Pakistan – President Asif Ali Zardari

Evening schedule

- El Salvador – President Carlos Mauricio Funes Cartagena
- Democratic Republic of the Congo – President Joseph Kabila Kabange
- Gabon – President Ali Bongo Ondimba
- Slovakia – President Ivan Gašparovič
- Nigeria – President Goodluck Ebele Jonathan
- Marshall Islands – President Christopher Loeak
- Nauru – President Sprent Arumogo Dabwido
- Czech Republic – President Václav Klaus
- Afghanistan – President Hamid Karzai
- Uganda – Vice President Edward Kiwanuka Ssekandi
- Spain – Prime Minister Mariano Rajoy
- Timor-Leste – Prime Minister Kay Rala Xanana Gusmão

=== 26 September 2012 ===
Morning schedule

- Yemen – President Abdrabuh Mansour Hadi Mansour
- Liberia – President Ellen Johnson Sirleaf
- Zambia – President Michael Chilufya Sata
- Luxembourg – Grand Duke Henri of Luxembourg
- Ukraine – President Viktor Yanukovych
- Ghana – President John Dramani Mahama
- Iran (Islamic Republic of) – President Mahmoud Ahmadinejad
- Kenya – President Mwai Kibaki
- Poland – President Bronisław Komorowski
- Egypt – President Mohamed Morsy
- Mexico – President Felipe Calderón Hinojosa
- United Kingdom of Great Britain and Northern Ireland – Prime Minister David Cameron
- Japan – Prime Minister Yoshihiko Noda
- European Union – President of the European Council Herman Van Rompuy
- Kuwait – Sheikh Jaber Al Mubarak Al Hamad Al Sabah, Prime Minister of Kuwait
- Italy – Prime Minister Mario Monti
- Australia – Prime Minister Julia Gillard

Afternoon schedule

- Colombia – President Juan Manuel Santos Calderón
- Swaziland – King Mswati III
- Guatemala – President Otto Fernando Pérez Molina
- Madagascar – President Andry Nirina Rajoelina
- Moldova – President Nicolae Timofti
- Estonia – President Toomas Hendrik Ilves
- Malawi – President Joyce Hilda Mtila Banda

Evening schedule

- Kiribati – President Anote Tong
- Zimbabwe – President Robert Mugabe
- Haiti – President Michel Joseph Martelly
- Latvia – President Andris Bērziņš
- Bolivia (Plurinational State of) – President Evo Morales Ayma
- Gambia (Republic of The) – Vice President Isatou Njie-Saidy
- Belgium – Prime Minister Elio Di Rupo
- Mali – Prime Minister Cheick Modibo Diarra
- Niger – Minister for Foreign Affairs Mohamed Bazoum
- Romania – Minister for Foreign Affairs Titus Corlățean
- Côte d’Ivoire – Minister for Foreign Affairs Daniel Kablan Duncan
- Cameroon – Minister for Foreign Affairs Pierre Moukoko Mbonjo
- Central African Republic – Minister for Foreign Affairs Antoine Gambi

==== Right of reply ====
Member states have the option to reply to comments on the day (or even to the days prior), but are limited to 10 minutes for the first response and five minutes for the second response. All speeches are made from the floor, as opposed to the podium for the General Debate.

Iran responded to Kuwait's assertion of UAE sovereignty over the Greater and Lesser Tunbs and Abu Musa. The delegate added that Iran was willing to talk over the issue to avoid misunderstanding, but added that sovereignty was non-negotiatable. He further added that the international name of the body of water for the Persian Gulf was misrepresented as the Arabian Gulf.

=== 27 September 2012 ===
Morning session

- Bosnia and Herzegovina – Chairman of the Presidency Bakir Izetbegović
- Mongolia – President Elbegdorj Tsakhia
- Tunisia – President Moncef Marzouki
- Guyana – President Donald Rabindranauth Ramotar
- Myanmar – President Thein Sein
- Former Yugoslav Republic of Macedonia – President Gjorge Ivanov
- Equatorial Guinea – President Teodoro Obiang Nguema Mbasogo
- Comoros – President Ikililou Dhoinine
- Brunei Darussalam – Crown Prince Haji Haji Al-Muhtadee Billah
- Jamaica – Prime Minister Portia Simpson Miller
- Cape Verde – President Jorge Carlos De Almeida Fonseca
- Palestine – Acting President Mahmoud Abbas (Note: The office of the Presidency of Palestine was under dispute between Fatah and Hamas at the time of the speech.)
- Slovenia – Prime Minister Janez Janša
- Israel – Prime Minister Benjamin Netanyahu
- Lesotho – Prime Minister Thomas Motsoahae Thabane

Afternoon session

- Micronesia (Federated States of) – President Emanuel Mori
- Maldives – President Mohamed Waheed
- Paraguay – President Luis Federico Franco Gómez
- Albania – President Bujar Nishani
- Libya – President Mohamed Yousef El-Magariaf
- Burundi – Vice President Thérence Sinunguruza
- Seychelles – Vice President Danny Faure
- Iraq – Vice President Khudayr al-Khuzai
- South Sudan – Vice President Riek Machar Teny-Dhurgon
- Antigua and Barbuda – Prime Minister Winston Baldwin Spencer
- Lebanon – Prime Minister Najib Mikati
- Bangladesh – Prime Minister Sheikh Hasina
- Thailand – Prime Minister Yingluck Shinawatra
- Solomon Islands – Prime Minister Gordon Darcy Lilo
- Kyrgyzstan – Speaker of Parliament Asylbek Jêênbekov
- Somalia – Prime Minister Abdiweli Mohamed Ali
- Turkmenistan – Deputy Prime Minister Raşit Meredow
- Greece – Minister for Foreign Affairs Dimitris L. Avramopoulos
- China – Minister for Foreign Affairs Jiechi Yang
- Norway – Minister for Foreign Affairs Espen Barth Eide
- Bahrain – Minister for Foreign Affairs Khalid bin Ahmed bin Mohammed Al Khalifa
- Guinea – Minister for Foreign Affairs Edouard Niankoye Lama
- Peru – Minister for Foreign Affairs Rafael Roncagliolo Orbegoso

==== Right of reply ====
Iran responded to Netanyahu. Japan responded to China, China reciprocated and both used their second right of reply as well.

=== 28 September 2012 ===
Morning session

- Saint Vincent and the Grenadines – Prime Minister Ralph Gonsalves
- Saint Lucia – Prime Minister Kenny Davis Anthony
- Bhutan – Prime Minister Lyonchoen Jigmi Yoezer Thinley
- Tonga – Prime Minister Lord Tu’ivakano
- Germany – Minister for Foreign Affairsr Guido Westerwelle
- Samoa – Prime Minister Tuilaepa Sailele Malielegaoi
- Saint Kitts and Nevis – Prime Minister Denzil Douglas
- Vanuatu – Prime Minister Meltek Sato Kilman Livtunvanu
- San Marino – Minister for Foreign Affairs Antonella Mularoni
- Nepal – Deputy Prime Minister Narayan Kaji Shrestha
- Malta – Minister for Foreign Affairs Tonio Borg
- Netherlands – Minister for Foreign Affairs Uri Rosenthal
- Chile – Minister for Foreign Affairs Alfredo Moreno Charme
- United Republic of Tanzania – Minister for Foreign Affairs Bernard Kamillius Membe
- Burkina Faso – Minister for Foreign Affairs Djibrill Ypènè Bassolé
- Turkey – Minister for Foreign Affairs Ahmet Davutoğlu

Afternoon session

- Croatia – Prime Minister Zoran Milanović
- Sao Tome and Principe – Prime Minister Patrice Emery Trovoada
- Ethiopia – Prime Minister Hailemariam Desalegn
- Morocco – Prince Moulay Rachid
- Ireland – Deputy Prime Minister Eamon Gilmore
- Austria – Vice Chancellor Michael Spindelegger
- Nicaragua – Minister for Foreign Affairs Samuel Santos López
- Russian Federation – Minister for Foreign Affairs Sergey V. Lavrov
- Lao People’s Democratic Republic – Minister for Foreign Affairs Thongloun Sisoulith
- Republic of Korea – Foreign and Trade Minister Kim Sung-hwan
- Saudi Arabia – Prince Saud Al-Faisal, Minister for Foreign Affairs
- Sweden – Minister for Foreign Affairs Carl Bildt
- United Arab Emirates – Sheikh Abdullah bin Zayed Al Nahyan, Minister for Foreign Affairs
- Monaco – Minister of External Affairs José Badia
- Uzbekistan – Minister for Foreign Affairs Abdulaziz Komilov
- Azerbaijan – Minister for Foreign Affairs Elmar Maharram Mammadyarov
- Fiji – Minister for Foreign Affairs Ratu Inoke Kubuabola
- Andorra – Minister for Foreign Affairs Gilbert Saboya Sunyé

==== Right of reply ====
Bolivia responded to Chile's comments about the maritime dispute, which Chile then countered. Then North Korea responded to the South Korean comments about its nuclear weapons programme. Iran then responded to claims of sovereignty over the islands by the UAE, and in Arab solidarity over the issue, as well as the Persian Gulf naming controversy. Bolivia took the stand again and was duly followed by Chile. UAE followed up its counter points to Iran's reply; it was then followed, in turn, by Iran's rebuttal and UAE closed out the session in its second reply.

=== 29 September 2012 ===
Morning session

- Montenegro – Minister for Foreign Affairs Nebojša Kaludjerović
- Iceland – Minister for Foreign Affairs Össur Skarphéðinsson
- Kazakhstan – Minister for Foreign Affairs Yerzhan Kazykhanov
- Cambodia – Minister for Foreign Affairs Hor Namhong
- Tajikistan – Minister for Foreign Affairs Hamrokhon Zafiri
- Algeria – Minister for Foreign Affairs Mourad Medelci
- Mozambique – Minister for Foreign Affairs Oldemiro Marques Balói
- Malaysia – Minister for Foreign Affairs Anifah Aman
- New Zealand – Minister for Foreign Affairs Murray Mccully
- Bahamas – Minister for Foreign Affairs Frederick A. Mitchell
- Liechtenstein – Minister for Foreign Affairs Aurelia Frick
- Uruguay – Minister for Foreign Affairs Luis Almagro
- Tuvalu – Minister for Foreign Affairs Apisai Ielemia
- Singapore – Minister for Foreign Affairs K. Shanmugam
- Chad – Minister for Foreign Affairs Moussa Faki Mahamat
- Mauritania – Minister for Foreign Affairs Hamady Ould Hamady
- Sudan – Minister for Foreign Affairs Ali Ahmed Karti
- Papua New Guinea – Minister for Foreign Affairs Rimbink Pato

=== 1 October 2012 ===
Morning session

- Canada – Minister for Foreign Affairs John Baird
- Armenia – Minister for Foreign Affairs Edward Nalbandyan
- Oman – Minister for Foreign Affairs Yousef bin Al-Alawi bin Abdulla
- Cuba – Minister for Foreign Affairs Bruno Rodríguez Parrilla
- India – Minister of External Affairs S. M. Krishna
- Djibouti – Minister for Foreign Affairs Mahamoud Ali Youssouf
- Syrian Arab Republic – Minister for Foreign Affairs Walid Al-Moualem
- Barbados – Minister for Foreign Affairs Maxine Pamela Ometa McClean
- Eritrea – Minister for Foreign Affairs Osman Mohammed Saleh
- Sri Lanka – Minister of External Affairs Gamini Lakshman Peiris
- Congo – Minister for Foreign Affairs Basile Ikouébé
- Mauritius – Minister for Foreign Affairs Arvin Boolell
- Costa Rica – Minister for Foreign Affairs Enrique Castillo
- Togo – Minister for Foreign Affairs Elliot Ohin
- Trinidad and Tobago – Minister for Foreign Affairs Winston Dookeran
- Angola – Permanent Representative Ismael Abraao Gaspar Martins

Afternoon session

- Philippines – Minister for Foreign Affairs Albert F. Del Rosario
- Belize – Minister for Foreign Affairs Wilfred Elrington
- Belarus – Minister for Foreign Affairs Vladimir Makei
- Botswana – Minister for Foreign Affairs Phandu Skelemani
- Suriname – Minister for Foreign Affairs Winston Lackin
- Sierra Leone – Foreign Minister Joseph Bandabla Dauda
- Holy See – Secretary for Relations with States Dominique Mamberti
- Democratic People's Republic of Korea – Vice Minister for Foreign Affairs Kung Sok Ung
- Ecuador – Deputy Minister for Foreign Affairs Marco Albuja
- Viet Nam – Vice Minister for Foreign Affairs Pham Quang Vinh
- Grenada – Permanent Representative Dessima Williams
- Palau – Permanent Representative Stuart Beck
- Denmark – Permanent Representative Carsten Staur
- Portugal – Permanent Representative José Filipe Moraes Cabral
- Venezuela (Bolivarian Republic of) – Permanent Representative Jorge Valero Briceño
- Dominica – Permanent Representative Vince Henderson
- United Nations – President of the 67th session Vuk Jeremić (Closing)

==== Right of reply ====
Pakistan responded to India's claim to Kashmir. Iran then responded to a "Western delegation" statement on its nuclear issue and criticised Israel. Azerbaijan responded to Armenia's comments and was then, in turn, replied to by Armenia. Eritrea then responded to Djibouti before Pakistan replied to India's reply and was then followed by Azerbaijan. At second responses, India briefly rebutted Pakistan's comment, before Armenia responded to Azerbaijan. President of the session, Vuk Jeremić, then closed out the meeting.

== Sideline events ==
During the events around the General Debate, the Contact Group for Syria was scheduled to meet, according to Egyptian Foreign Minister Mohamed Kamel Amr, whose country recently invited Iran to join the group, who was speaking alongside Turkey's Ahmet Davutoğlu and Iran's Ali Akbar Salehi. Salehi added: "To expect a quick solution from one meeting is unrealistic. We must be patient. But I confirm to you that the things we agree on are greater than our differences. [We could table a proposal that] we hope, God willing, will produce a result that satisfies everyone...But this needs more talks." The UN-Arab League envoy to Syria Lakhdar Brahimi said he would make his next report to the Security Council and Arab ministers who will be attending for the General Debate. The meeting on 26 September, unnamed Arab foreign ministers met Brahimi. Tunisia's President Moncef Marzouki then suggested "a peacekeeping operation by Arab nations is something we could well imagine. We have really pushed for a peaceful solution, but if it is necessary, it must be an Arab peacekeeping force, yes." He also called Syrian President Bashar al-Assad "a bloodthirsty dictator." The previous day, though Qatar's Emir Hamad bin Khalifa Al Thani told the General Debate of an Arab intervention, Arab League Secretary-General Nabil Elaraby said he did not interpret this as a "fighting force" and added that he told the UNSC it must support Brahimi by enforcing its resolutions on Syria as "binding on all parties."

In regards to the Senkaku Islands dispute and the recent purchase by Japan of three uninhabited islands from a private Japanese citizen which also led to anti-Japanese protests in China, Chinese Foreign Minister Yang Jiechi told his Japanese counterpart Kōichirō Genba on 25 September that Japan had "severe[ly] infringement" its sovereignty. He added that China–Japan relations would remain strained until the purchase was reversed. A statement from the Chinese Foreign Ministry later read: "The Chinese side will by no means tolerate any unilateral action by the Japanese side on the Diaoyu Islands [sic]." The same day, Japanese Prime Minister Yoshihiko Noda said after the UNGA meeting: "So far as the Senkaku islands are concerned, they are an integral part of our territory in the light of history and of international law. It is very clear and there are no territorial issues as such. Therefore there cannot be any compromise that could mean any setback from this basic position. I have to make that very clear. The resolution of this issue should not be by force, but calmly, through reason and with respect for international law." The dispute re-arose after Yang spoke about the issue at the General Debate and Japan then responded during the Right of Reply and was countered by China, leading to rebuttal by Japan and another statement by China.

At the same time, on the first day of the General Debate, discussion involved the recently passed controversy over Innocence of Muslims and the violent protests that followed. Discussions included how to regulate freedom of speech in regards to religious sensitivities and where to make some speech illegal. Opponents suggested such proposals for regulation could be misused in order to silence dissent. Similarly, Nigeria's President Goodluck Jonathan added during his speech that religious denigration and incitement should not occur. U.S. President Barack Obama also condemned the video, but added such violent protests that led to deaths should also be condemned. Yemen's Abd Rabbuh Mansur Hadi also condemned the film and the violent protests, while also criticising the facade of freedom of expression that is cited to produce such films. Liberia's Ellen Johnson Sirleaf also criticised the incitement to Muslims, as did Egypt's Mohamed Morsi in criticising Islamophobia and calling the release of the video as an "organised campaign against Islamic sanctities" which requires a "firm stand." At the same time, he called for rejecting violent protests. They were joined by Kuwait's Jaber Al-Mubarak Al-Hamad Al-Sabah who criticised the violent protests and the incitement, while mentioning Kuwaiti's Emir Sabah Al-Ahmad Al-Jaber Al-Sabah's call for keeping all religious symbols above the purview of freedom of express. Australia's Julia Gillard added: "Denigration of religious beliefs is never acceptable...However, our tolerance must never extend to tolerating religious hatred and incitement to violence. The sentiment was echoed by Guatemala's Otto Pérez Molina, Latvia's Andris Bērziņš, Belgium's Elio Di Rupo, Niger's Mohamed Bazoum, Romania's Titus Corlățean, Bosnia and Herzegovina's Bakir Izetbegović, Comoros' Ikililou Dhoinine, Brunei Darussalam's Haji Al-Muhtadee Billah, Maldives' Mohamed Waheed Hassan, Albania's Bujar Nishani, Antigua and Barbuda's Winston Baldwin Spencer, Lebanon's Najib Mikati, Greece's Dimitris Avramopoulos, Bahrain's Khalid bin Ahmed Al Khalifa, Saint Lucia's Kenny Davis Anthony, Turkey's Ahmet Davutoğlu São Tomé and Príncipe's Patrice Emery Trovoada, Morocco's Moulay Rachid, Saudi Arabia's Saud Al-Faisal, UAE's Abdullah bin Zayed Al Nahyan, Azerbaijan's Elmar Mammadyarov, Oman's Yousef Bin Al-Alawi Bin Abdulla, India's S. M. Krishna, Djibouti's Mahamoud Ali Youssouf, Costa Rica's Enrique Castillo, Botswana's Phandu T. C. Skelemani and Sierra Leone's J. B. Dauda. While some said violence is never recourse to the right to free speech; and other said religious should not be abused; yet others called for the inviobility of diplomatic missions to be respected in line with the Vienna Convention.

Myanmar's Thein Sein met U.S. Secretary of State Hillary Clinton on the sidelines of the summit. She announced the lifting of some sanctions against his country, namely the allowing of imports from the former to the latter after support for the move from the government and the opposition in Myanmar. In turn Sein thanked her and the U.S. saying the gesture was approved by his people.

Under the behest of Saudi Arabia, a "Friends of Yemen" summit was held to support new Yememi President Abd Rabbuh Mansur Hadi's call for a national dialogue in his country amidst the 2011–2012 Yemeni uprising.

A high-level discussion was also held amongst member states, the UN Office for Disarmament Affairs and NGO's on the topic of "Women, disarmament, non-prolifertation and arms control" during the first week of the General Debate. A joint statement was signed by all members for promoting the equitable representation of women in decision-making; and a General Assembly resolution is expected during this session.

== See also ==
- List of UN General Assembly sessions
- List of General debates of the United Nations General Assembly
