= Sixty-seventh session of the United Nations General Assembly =

- 18 September 2012 – 17 September 2013 67th session 67th general debate
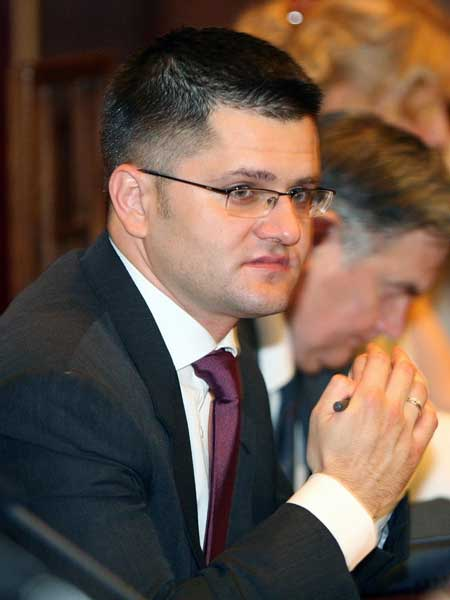
- President of the 67th General Assembly; Vuk Jeremić
- Host country: United Nations
- Cities: New York City
- Venues: General Assembly Hall at the United Nations Headquarters
- Participants: Member States of the United Nations
- Secretary-General: Ban Ki-moon
- Website: www.un.org/en/ga/

The sixty-seventh session of the United Nations General Assembly opened on 18 September 2012 and had its last scheduled meeting on 11 September 2013. The president of the United Nations General Assembly was chosen from the EEG (the smallest regional grouping) with Serbia's then foreign minister Vuk Jeremić beating out Lithuania's Dalius Čekuolis in an election. Notably, the session led to United Nations General Assembly resolution 67/19 which granted Palestine non-member observer state status.

== Organisation for the session ==
On 23 June 2011, Serbia's Vuk Jeremić was elected president of the United Nations General Assembly after beating Lithuania's Dalius Čekuolis in an election. This was the turn of the Eastern European Group to preside over the General Assembly. He also said that the session would prioritise what he characterised as 'issues of great concern, including the promotion of sustainable development and the maintenance unity amongst UN member states.' In his acceptance speech, he said:

I hope that our joint endeavours may help to bring us closer to the day when humankind shall have assuaged its hurts and abolished its fears; and, in so doing, to further the aspirations of the peoples of the United Nations to save succeeding generations from the scourge of war. May it be the will of God that the next session of the General Assembly goes down in history as one of peace.

As is tradition during each session of the General Assembly, Secretary-General Ban Ki-moon drew lots to see which member state would take the helm at the first seat in the General Assembly Chamber. On 8 June 2012, Jamaica was chosen to lead the chamber, while the other member states would follow according to the English translation of their name, the same order would be followed in the six main committees.

The Chairmen and officers of the six Main Committees were also elected: First Committee (Disarmament and International Security Committee);Second Committee (Economic and Financial Committee); Third Committee (Social, Humanitarian and Cultural Committee); Fourth Committee (Special Political and Decolonization Committee); Fifth Committee (Administrative and Budgetary Committee); and the Sixth Committee (Legal Committee) .

The nineteen vice-presidents of the UNGA also elected were from: Afghanistan, Bangladesh, China, Lebanon, Nepal (Asian group), Algeria, Angola, Congo, Ghana, Sierra Leone (African group), Russia (Eastern European group), Honduras, Peru, Trinidad and Tobago (Latin American and Caribbean group), France, Israel, Netherlands, Palau, United Kingdom and the United States of America (Western European and Others group). An additional African member would be elected at a later date.

== Opening schedule ==
The opening session of the 67th UNGA includes:

- 18 September 2012: At 15:00, the session was officially opened.
- 24 September: A high-level meeting took place in regards to the rule of law.
- 25 September: From 10:00 onwards the annual General Debate will begin and continue for about a week.

President Vuk Jeremic said at the opening of the session: "Peace and security is a prerequisite for the stability needed for global economic growth, sustainable development and social progress. Our objective should be the full implementation of the mandate this body received at the Rio+20 Conference. This will require a decisive commitment to observe not only procedural deadlines but also the political and financial objectives it has been designed to accomplish." He also said the main theme of the session would be the peaceful settlement of international disputes: "I hope this framework will usefully serve the noble cause of preventing gathering conflicts and resolving existing ones." As well as maintaining the rule of law: "Close to 800 years after the Magna Carta was promulgated, many people around the world still do not enjoy the fundamental rights enshrined in that seminal document – rights that protect individuals, while enabling countries to develop in peace and security, as sovereign equals. I urge the Member States to agree on a consensus document by the start of the High-Level Debate on the Rule of Law in a few days' time." Other important goals for the session are: peace and security as a means of enhancing development, a focus before te Millennium Development Goals' deadline in 2015, achieving the commitments made at the United Nations Conference on Sustainable Development in Brazil in June, progress on arms control and disarmament, strengthening UN peacekeeping operations, coordinating global responses to non-state terrorism and the promotion of human rights.

He was also congratulated by UN Secretary-General Ban Ki-moon, who said of the session ahead: "We are living through a period of unease. These are times of rising unemployment, rising inequality, rising temperatures – and rising intolerance. The United Nations must rise to the moment."

=== General Debate ===
Most states will have a representative speaking about issues concerning their country and the hopes for the coming year as to what the UNGA will do. This is as opportunity for the member states to opine on international issues of their concern. The General Debate will commence with the opening of the session on 25 September and continue until 1 October.

The order of speakers is given first to member states, then observer states and supranational bodies. Any other observers entities will have a chance to speak at the end of the debate, if they so choose. Speakers will be put on the list in the order of their request, with special consideration for ministers and other government officials of similar or higher rank. According to the rules in place for the General Debate, the statements should be in one of the United Nations official languages of Arabic, Chinese, English, French, Russian or Spanish, and will be translated by the United Nations translators. Each speaker is requested to provide 20 advance copies of their statements to the conference officers to facilitate translation and to be presented at the podium. Speeches are requested to be limited to five minutes, with seven minutes for supranational bodies. President Vuk Jeremic chose the theme: "Adjustment or settlement of international disputes or situations by peaceful means."

== Agenda ==
A multitude of issues, including administrative affairs for the UN, are on the broader preliminary agenda for the session. There is also a day-by-day schedule.

A high level meeting on the rule of law took place on 24 September. President Vuk Jeremic also constituted a three-person panel on the Post-2015 Development Agenda in regards to the encroaching deadline to meet the Millennium Development Goals. The three-members are: Indonesia's Susilo Bambang Yudhoyono, Liberia's Ellen Johnson Sirleaf and the United Kingdom's David Cameron.

=== Issues ===
It had been speculated by the Middle Eastern media that the Iranian nuclear programme, along with the Syrian civil war, would constitute the main focus of the session. A few days before the session began, international leaders arrived for the General Debate amongst worry that these two issues would lead to a wider international conflict. Iranian President Mahmoud Ahmadinejad said that the United States, United Kingdom and France "violate the basic rights and freedoms of other nations" and called Israelis "uncultured Zionists." In addition, U.N. and Arab League envoy for Syria Lakhdar Brahimi warned the Security Council that the Syrian civil war was worsening, but Russia and China still used their veto power to in opposition to international intervention in Syria.

Similar to the previous year, Palestinian Authority President Mahmoud Abbas vowed to take up the issue of Palestinian membership in some form on 27 September at the General Debate, as part of a campaign the Western media viewed as an attempt to gain the international community's attention. However, Abbas did not call for formally putting the issue to a vote. The move followed days of Palestinian protests directed against the Palestinian Authority in the West Bank cities of Bethlehem, Nablus and Hebron. However, unlike the previous year, where Abbas sought full-member status, he will symbolically seek non-member status. At the same time, the Palestinian delegation will be half the size of that of the previous year. Following Operation Pillar of Defense, the Palestinians promised to seek a vote on an upgrade in status to non-member observer state in the UN General Assembly on 29 November, the symbolic date the UN chose voted on the Partition Plan in 1947, leading to the founding of Israel, and the International Day of Solidarity with the Palestinian People. On 29 November, the UNGA voted on the issue.

The resumed part of the GA's 67th Session also include several thematic public debates. One of them is the thematic debate on the role of international criminal justice in reconciliation.

After a meeting with session President Vuk Jeremic, South Africa's Minister of International Relations and Cooperation Maite Nkoana-Mashabane called for at least two permanent seats on the UNSC saying: "We agree with all member states that change cannot be if it (UN) continues to ignore and exclude the 54-member African Union (AU). We have taken a very clear position that there will be no change without us because 70 percent of the issues taken to the UNSC and are tabled for discussion are about us." Jeremic responded that "a fair representation of African states in the UNSC is needed. The current composition of the UNSC does not reflect the realities of the 21th [sic] century. If the institution does not keep up with the times and environment, the UNSC will become slowly but surely irrelevant."

== Resolutions ==
Resolutions have come before the UNGA between 3 October 2012 and summer 2013. United Nations General Assembly resolution 67/19 granted Palestine non-member observer state status.

== Elections ==
The election of non-permanent members to the Security Council for 2013–2014 was held in October 2012. Outgoing members were Colombia, Germany, India, Portugal and South Africa.

An election to choose 18 members of the United Nations Human Rights Council for a three-year term took place from 12–18 November. The outgoing members were: Cameroon, Djibouti, Mauritius, Nigeria and Senegal (African group); Bangladesh, China, Jordan, Kyrgyzstan and Saudi Arabia (Asian group); Hungary and Russia (Eastern European group); Cuba, Mexico and Uruguay (Latin American and Caribbean group); and Belgium, Norway and the United States (Western Europe and Others group). Current candidates were: Ivory Coast, Gabon, Ethiopia, Sierra Leone and Sudan (African group); Kazakhstan, Pakistan, Japan, South Korea and the United Arab Emirates (Asian group); Estonia and Montenegro (Eastern European group); Argentina, Brazil and Venezuela (Latin American and Caribbean group); and Germany, Greece, Ireland, Sweden and the United States, though there are only three vacancies (Western Europea and Others group). Those members whose terms expire in June will automatically have their terms extended by six months. Only the Western Europe and Others group was a contested election, with the winners being: Ireland, Germany and the United States. Additionally, other candidates that received votes were: Sudan (4), Bolivia (2), Panama (1) and the Netherlands (1). Côte d'Ivoire, Estonia, Ethiopia, Ireland, Kazakhstan, Kenya, Montenegro, Sierra Leone, the United Arab Emirates and Venezuela won seats to the body for the first time; while the United States was re-elected; and Argentina, Brazil, Gabon, Germany, Japan, Pakistan and South Korea had previously served non-consecutive terms.

The election of 18 members to the United Nations Economic and Social Council. Elections require a two-thirds majority, with outgoing members capable of running again, should they choose. The outgoing members are: Argentina, Bahamas, Bangladesh, Canada, Chile, Comoros, Egypt, Ghana, Iraq, Italy, Mongolia, Netherlands, Philippines, Rwanda, Slovakia, Ukraine, United States of America and Zambia. Turkmenistan is one of the candidates.

An election will also take place for the Committee for Programme and Coordination for three-year terms. The 7 outgoing members are: Comoros, France, Haiti, Israel, Namibia, Russia and Venezuela. Following the Economic and Social Council's nominations the General Assembly consensually elected seven members to the Committee for Programme and Coordination for three‑year terms from 1 January 2013. These were: Botswana and Tanzania (African group); Russia (Eastern European group); Peru (Latin American and Caribbean group); and France (Western Europe and Others group). Another Eastern European and Western Europe and Others members were due to be chosen later. They will join the other states already on the committee: Algeria, Antigua and Barbuda, Argentina, Belarus, Benin, Brazil, Bulgaria, Cameroon, China, Cuba, Eritrea, Guinea, Guinea-Bissau, Iran, Italy, Japan, Kazakhstan, Malaysia, Pakistan, South Korea, Moldova, Uruguay and Zimbabwe. The new term will begin on 1 January 2013 in accordance with paragraph 7 of the General Assembly resolution 60/251.

An election will also be held to choose members for six-year terms to the United Nations Commission on International Trade Law. The outgoing members are: Armenia, Bahrain, Benin, Bolivia, Bulgaria, Cameroon, Canada, Chile, China, Egypt, El Salvador, France, Germany, Greece, Honduras, Japan, Latvia, Malaysia, Malta, Mexico, Morocco, Namibia, Norway, South Korea, Russia, Senegal, Singapore, South Africa, Sri Lanka and the United Kingdom.

An election will be held for the Organizational Committee of the Peacebuilding Commission. The General Assembly decided, during the 63rd session, that its nominations would have their terms commence on 1 January, instead of 23 June. Terms will last two years. Though nominations are filed by other UN organs, the outgoing seats up for election in the General Assembly are: Benin, Brazil, Indonesia, Tunisia and Uruguay.

=== Appointments ===
Appointments occurred for the Advisory Committee on Administrative and Budgetary Questions. The outgoing members were: Botswana, Croatia, Jamaica, Jordan and Nigeria.

The Committee on Contributions also had new appointees. Outgoing members were: Japan, Kuwait, Poland, Somalia, Ukraine and the United States of America.

The secretary-general's nominations for two- or three-year terms to the Investments Committee were also confirmed. Outgoing members were: Argentina and Botswana.

Appointments to the International Civil Service Commission also took place. Outgoing members were: Algeria, Bangladesh, China Morocco and Russia. The full-time chair and vice-chair were not up for election.

Appointments also occurred for members and alternates to the United Nations Staff Pension Committee. Four individuals of each category were selected. Outgoing members were: Argentina, Bangladesh, Germany, Japan, Kenya, Russia, the United States of America and Zimbabwe.

Appointments were also made to the Committee on Conferences. Outgoing members were: Côte d'Ivoire, Germany, Nigeria, Panama, Moldova, Syria and Venezuela.

== Closing schedule ==
In closing, outgoing President Vuk Jeremic highlighted the success and failures of the session, including the inability to stop the conflict in Syria.

== See also ==
- List of UN General Assembly sessions
- List of General debates of the United Nations General Assembly
