= 2012 United Nations General Assembly presidential election =

United Nations General Assembly presidential election, 2012
- 8 June 2012
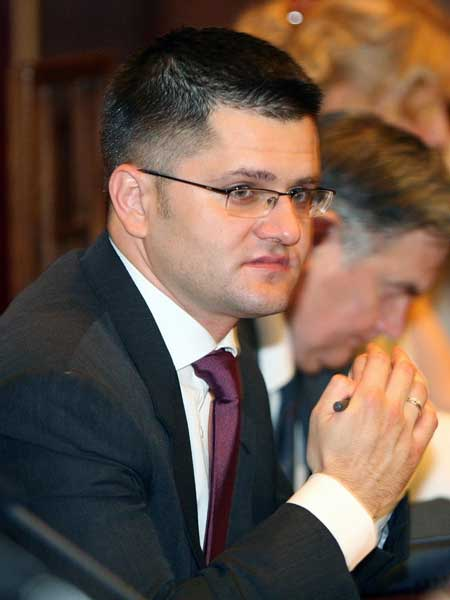

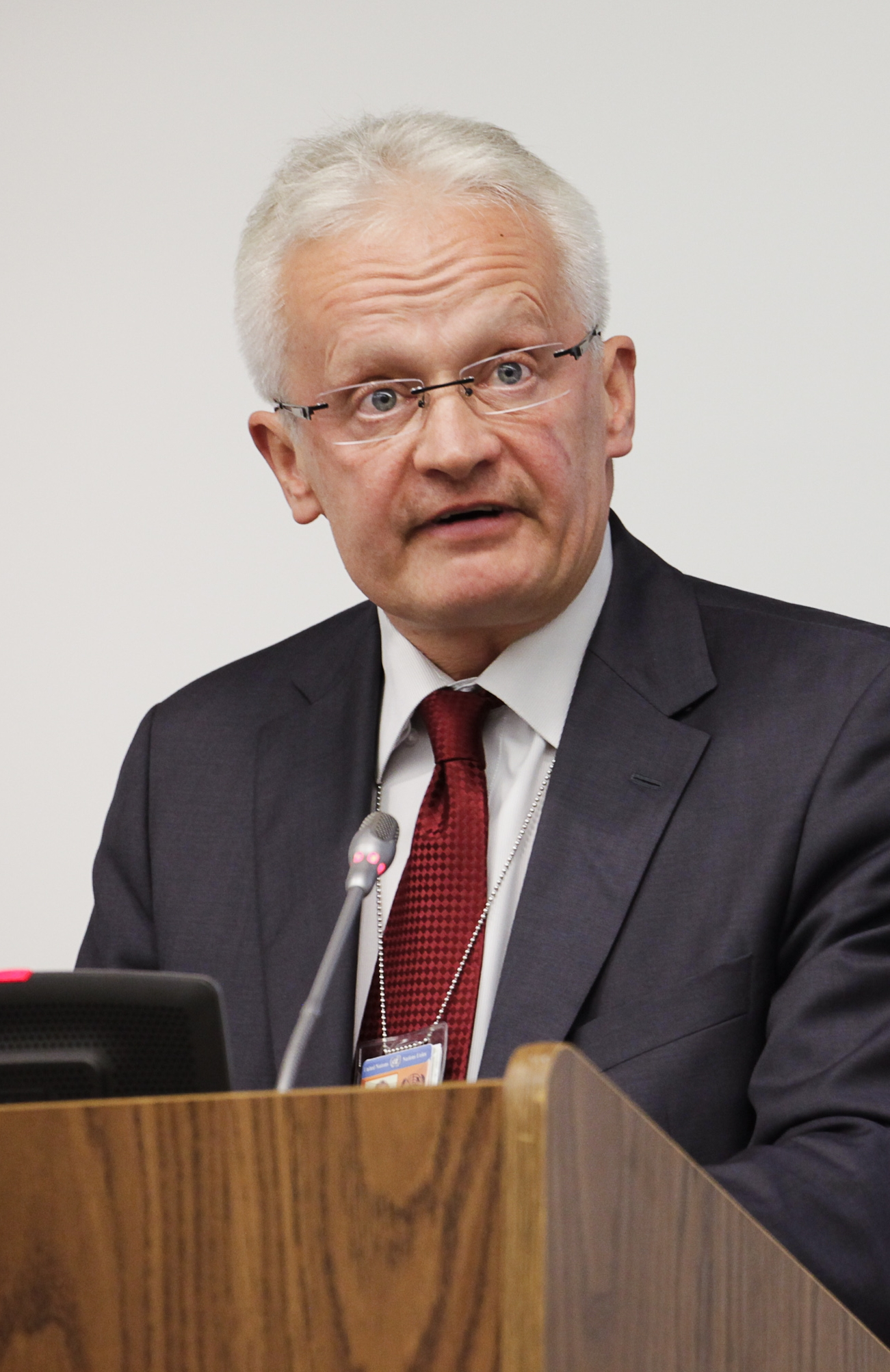
Nominee	(Serbia) Vuk Jeremić	(Lithuania) Dalius Čekuolis
Party	DS	Independent
Popular vote	99	85
President before election
(Qatar) Nassir Abdulaziz Al-Nasser
Independent
President-elect
(Serbia) Vuk Jeremić
DS

An indirect presidential election was held to choose the President of the United Nations General Assembly on 8 June 2012 to replace Nassir Abdulaziz Al-Nasser and preside over the Sixty-seventh session of the United Nations General Assembly. It was the rotational turn of the Eastern European Group to preside over the session.

Vuk Jeremić is elected with 99 votes for and 85 votes against. This was the first time since 1991 that there was no consensus candidate from the regional grouping, thus invoking a secret ballot vote. Jeremić then served as president from 2012 to 2013.

== Background ==
Though there is usually a consensus candidate from the rotational group which is scheduled to hold he post of president of the UNGA, if there is no consensus candidate then a vote is held by secret ballot.

=== Electorate ===
The Eastern European Group is the smallest of the UN regional groups with 23 members who are informally entitled to choose a candidate from within their group. Failure to do so would result in a secret ballot amongst the entire United Nations General Assembly (the last time this happened was in 1991 when the Asian Group failed to agree on a candidate out of three options).

== Election ==
=== Reactions ===
After his election, Jeremić traveled to China and met General Secretary Xi Jinping. In his acceptance speech, Jeremic said:

I hope that our joint endeavours may help to bring us closer to the day when humankind shall have assuaged its hurts and abolished its fears; and, in so doing, to further the aspirations of the peoples of the United Nations to save succeeding generations from the scourge of war. May it be the will of God that the next session of the General Assembly goes down in history as one of peace.
