= Dalius Čekuolis =

Lithuanian diplomat

Ambassador Dalius Čekuolis
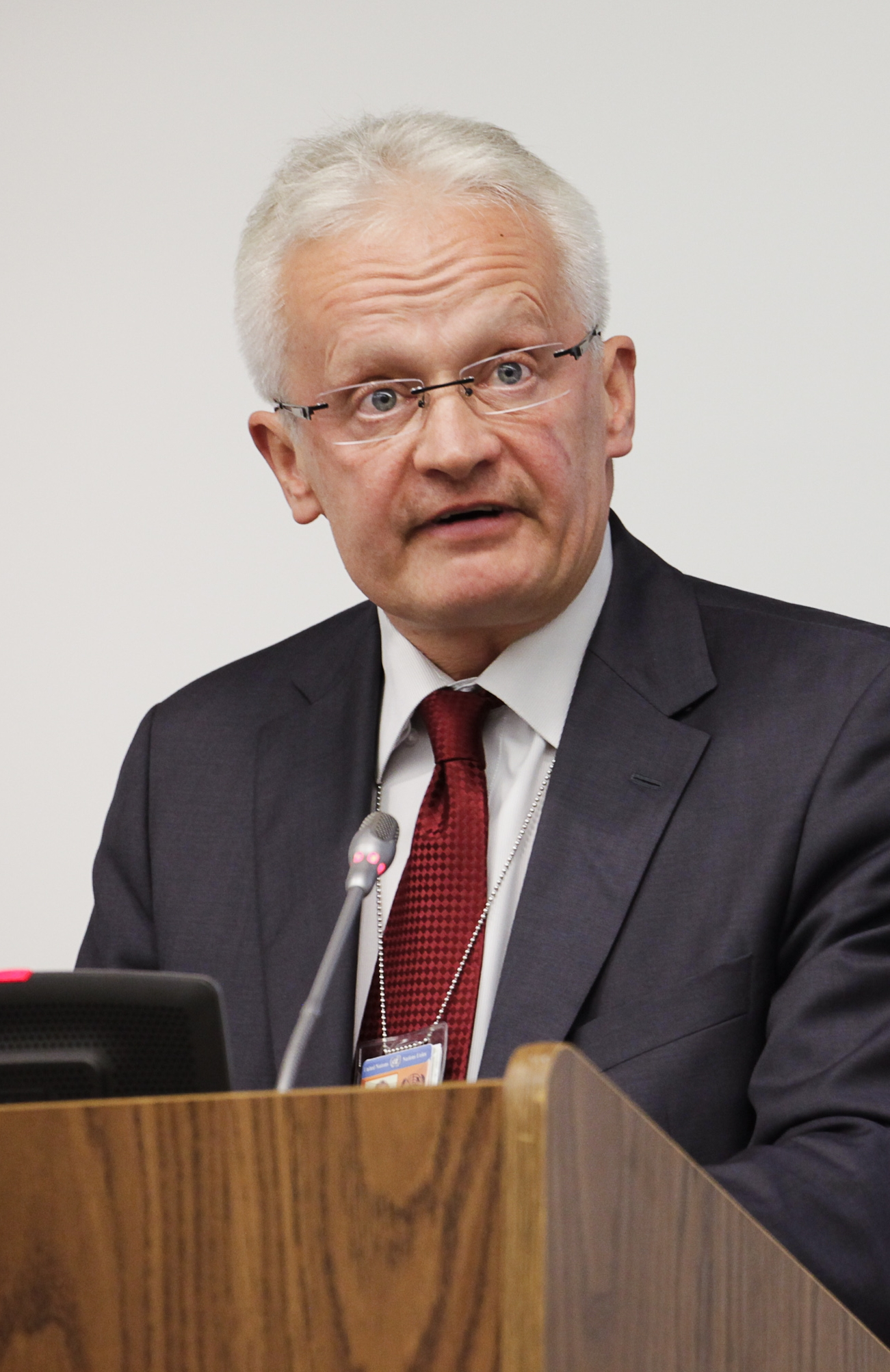

Lithuanian Permanent Representative to the United Nations
- In office 2 March 2006 – 2012

Personal details
- Born: 29 March 1959 (age 67) Vilnius
- Spouse: Jūratė Čekuolienė
- Children: One daughter
- Education: Moscow State Institute of International Relations

Dalius Čekuolis (born 29 March 1959) is a Lithuanian career diplomat who was Lithuania's Permanent Representative to the UN from 2006 to 2012, and since 2019 is Deputy Minister of Foreign Affairs of Lithuania. Previously, he served as the President of the United Nations Economic and Social Council (ECOSOC), a primary organ of the United Nations (2007), Chair of the Third Biennial Meeting of States to Consider the Implementation of the United Nations Conference on the Illicit Trade in Small Arms to Prevent, Combat and Eradicate the Illicit Trade in Small Arms and Light Weapons in All its Aspects (2008), Co-Chairman of the Ad Hoc Working Group on the Revitalization of the General Assembly (2010-2011), as well as the Vice-minister of Foreign Affairs and an ambassador of Lithuania to several European countries.

== Education ==
Dailus Čekuolis graduated from the Moscow State Institute of International Relations in 1982.

== Diplomatic career ==
In 1990, Čekuolis became spokesman for the Ministry of Foreign Affairs of Lithuania as Head of the Press and Information Department.

In 1992, he became Lithuania's ambassador to Denmark, Norway, and Iceland, a position he held until 1994. From 1994 until 1998 he was ambassador to Belgium, the Netherlands, and Luxembourg, and representative to the Western European Union and NATO's North Atlantic Cooperation Council.

From 1998 to 1999, Čekuolis was Head of the Committee of Senior Officials of the Council of the Baltic Sea States (CBSS), and from 1999 until 2004, he was Lithuania's ambassador to Portugal. In 2004, he was appointed to the position of Undersecretary of the Foreign Ministry, where he was responsible for security policy.

=== UN career ===
Čekuolis became Lithuania's Permanent Representative to the United Nations on 2 March 2006. On 23 March 2006, he was elected as a vice-president of ECOSOC, to fulfill the term of ambassador Gediminas Šerkšnys. On 17 January 2007, he was elected to the one-year Presidency of ECOSOC, succeeding Tunisian Ali Hachani. In 2008, Čekuolis successfully chaired the Third Biennial Meeting of States to Consider the Implementation of the Programme of Action to Prevent, Combat and Eradicate the Illicit Trade in SALW in All its Aspects in 2008, co-chaired the Working Group on the Revitalization of the General Assembly in 2010-2011.

=== United Nations General Assembly presidential election ===
In 2004, Lithuania informed the UN member states of its decision to apply for the post of the President of the Sixty-seventh session of the United Nations General Assembly (starting in September 2012) and notified about the decision to submit the candidature of Ambassador Dalius Čekuolis in June 2011 for the 2012 election. On 8 June 2012 he lost the secret ballot in the UN General Assembly to Serbia's Foreign Minister Vuk Jeremić, receiving the votes of 85 countries, while Jeremić received 99.
