= Vuk Jeremić =

Serbian politician and diplomat (born 1975)

- Вук Јеремић
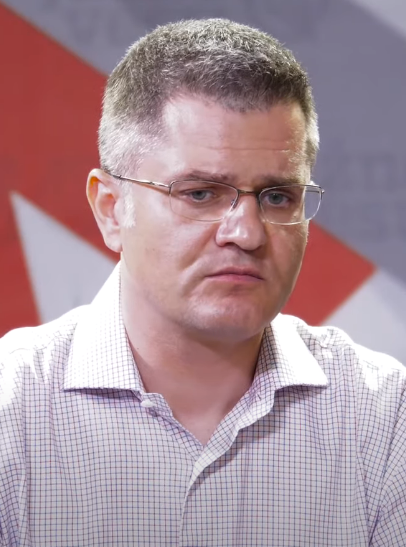
- Jeremić in 2020

President of the United Nations General Assembly
- In office 18 September 2012 – 17 September 2013
- Preceded by: Nassir Abdulaziz Al-Nasser
- Succeeded by: John William Ashe

Minister of Foreign Affairs
- In office 15 May 2007 – 27 July 2012
- Prime Minister: Vojislav Koštunica; Mirko Cvetković
- Preceded by: Vuk Drašković
- Succeeded by: Ivan Mrkić

Personal details
- Born: 3 July 1975 (age 51) Belgrade, SR Serbia, Yugoslavia
- Party: DS (2000–2013); Narodna (2017–present)
- Spouse: Nataša Lekić
- Children: 1
- Parents: Mihajlo Jeremić; Sena Buljubašić
- Relatives: Pozderac family
- Education: Queens' College, Cambridge; University of London; Harvard University

Vuk Jeremić (Serbian Cyrillic: Вук Јеремић, pronounced [ʋûːk jěremitɕ]; born 3 July 1975) is a Serbian politician and diplomat who served as the president of the United Nations General Assembly from 2012 to 2013 and as the Minister of Foreign Affairs of Serbia from 2007 to 2012.

In the early 1990s, Jeremić and his parents left Yugoslavia. Jeremić graduated from the University of Cambridge and Harvard University in 1998 and 2003, respectively, and was active in several pro-democracy student movements during the 1990s. In the early 2000s, he joined what The New York Times deemed Serbia's "most westward-leaning government" as an advisor to President Boris Tadić. In May 2007, Jeremić was appointed Minister of Foreign Affairs. During his tenure, he spearheaded Serbia's fervent opposition to Kosovo's unilateral secession, the Serbian authorities arrested several war crimes suspects and extradited them to the International Criminal Tribunal for the former Yugoslavia in The Hague, and there was a significant improvement in relations between Serbia and the West. In 2009, the European Union lifted all visa restrictions on citizens of Serbia, and in 2012, declared the country a candidate for membership.

Jeremić is the youngest person ever to have served as President of the United Nations General Assembly. His tenure saw Palestine granted non-member observer status in the General Assembly, the General Assembly's adoption of the Arms Trade Treaty (ATT), which aimed to regulate international conventional weapons commerce, and the proclamation of 6 April as the International Day of Sport for Development and Peace. Jeremić describes himself as a "fervent, pro-European politician". He is the current president of the Center for International Relations and Sustainable Development (CIRSD) and editor-in-chief of Horizons, an English-language global public policy magazine. Jeremić was a candidate in the race to succeed Ban Ki-moon as United Nations Secretary-General in 2016, finishing second overall, behind eventual winner António Guterres. He unsuccessfully ran in the 2017 Serbian presidential election as an independent candidate. In October 2017, he founded the People's Party. In September 2023 he joined Sciences Po as an Adjunct Professor at the Paris School of International Affairs.

== Early life ==
=== Family ===
Vuk Jeremić was born in Belgrade on 3 July 1975. Jeremić's parents are Sena (née Buljubašić) and Mihajlo Jeremić. His father is an Orthodox Serb from Belgrade and his mother is a Muslim Bosniak whose ancestors hailed from the northwestern Bosnian town of Cazin. During the 1980s, Jeremić's father was the CEO of Jugopetrol, a large state-owned oil company.

Jeremić's paternal grandfather, Bogoljub, was an officer in the Royal Yugoslav Army. In April 1941, at the height of World War II, he was captured by the Germans during the Axis invasion of Yugoslavia and imprisoned, first at Matthausen and then at Dachau. He returned to Yugoslavia by foot, only to be arrested as a political dissident by the country's new communist authorities and jailed at the Goli Otok prison camp, where he spent the next five years. Through his mother, Jeremić stems from the prominent Pozderac family, widely considered the most influential Bosnian Muslim political dynasty in post-war Yugoslavia. Jeremić's maternal great-grandfather, Nurija Pozderac, was a prominent Bosnian Muslim politician in Depression-era Yugoslavia. A staunch anti-fascist, he joined Josip Broz Tito's Partisans in the early 1940s and was killed in action in 1943. Nurija and his wife Devleta were posthumously declared Righteous Among the Nations by Yad Vashem for saving Jews during the Holocaust, and Jeremić accepted a medal and certificate identifying them as such at a ceremony in Belgrade in November 2012. According to survivors, the couple sheltered Jews who snuck out of a train destined for the Jasenovac concentration camp, which was operated by Croatia's fascist ruling party, the Ustashas. Pozderac's nephews Hamdija and Hakija featured prominently in Yugoslav political circles during the 1980s.

=== Education ===
Jeremić completed his elementary schooling in Belgrade, moving on to the First Belgrade Gymnasium where he began his high school studies. There, he met Boris Tadić, a pro-Western psychology professor and future President of Serbia whom the young Jeremić came to regard as a role model and mentor. Before long, Jeremić's family was blacklisted by the increasingly authoritarian government of Yugoslav leader Slobodan Milošević, and had to flee the country. They settled in the United Kingdom, and Jeremić finished his high school education in London.

Jeremić continued his post-secondary studies at the University of Cambridge (Queens' College), graduating with a bachelor's degree in theoretical physics in 1998. His years there coincided with the Yugoslav Wars, which negatively affected Serbia's reputation abroad. Jeremić's time at Cambridge provided him with insight into how his country was perceived overseas during the war years. "It was hard to explain that you come from Serbia and you’re not a children-eating radical," Jeremić recalled.

Jeremić began his Ph.D studies in quantitative finance at the University of London (Imperial College), and worked for Deutsche Bank, Dresdner Kleinwort and AstraZeneca in the British capital. Beginning in 2001, he studied under Jeffrey Sachs at Harvard Kennedy School at Harvard University as a fellow in the Kokkalis Foundation's Program on Southeastern and East-Central Europe, graduating in 2003 with a master's degree in public administration and international development.

== Career ==
=== Formative years ===
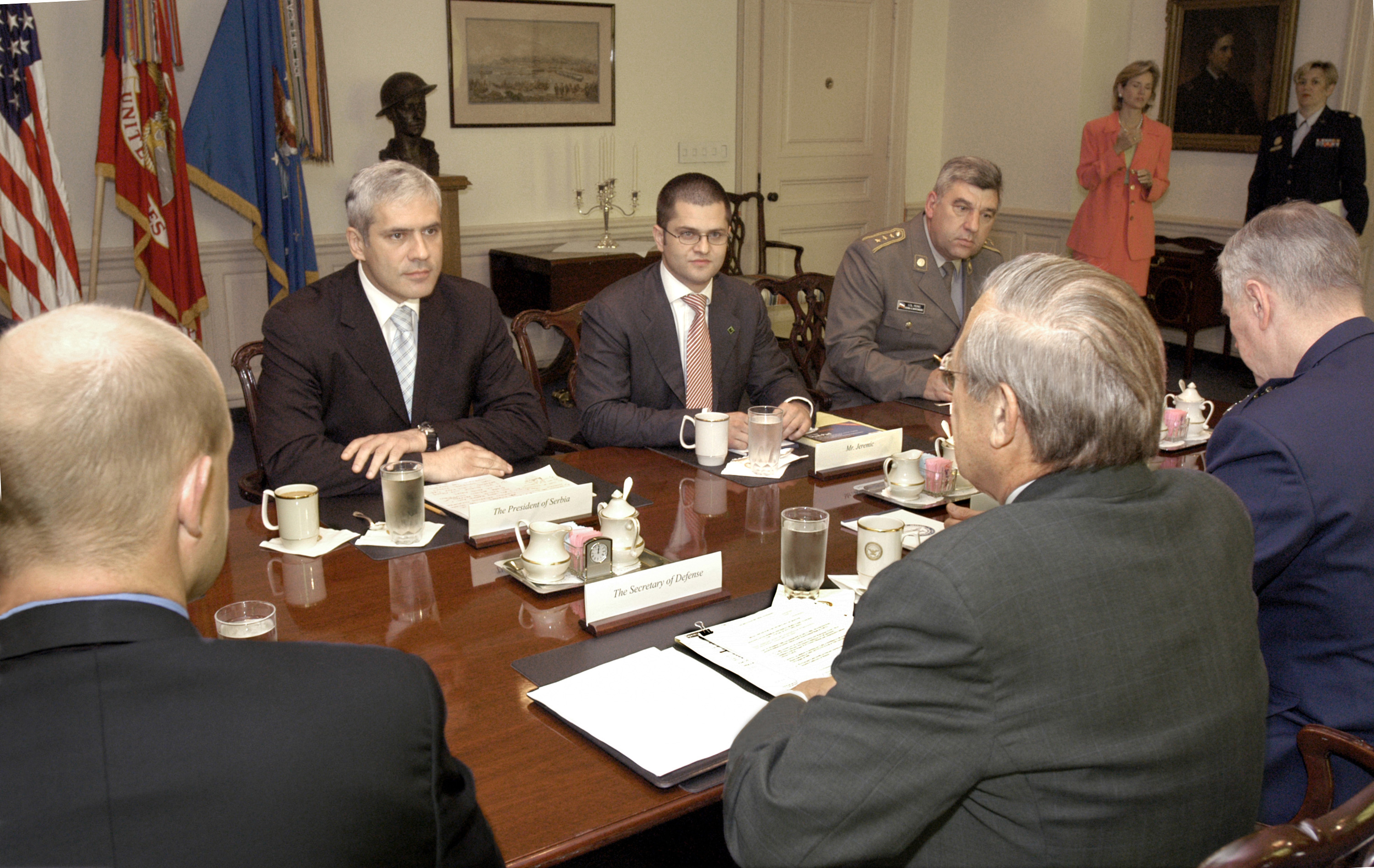
Tadić and Jeremić meeting with U.S. Secretary of Defense Donald Rumsfeld at The Pentagon, 20 July 2004

In July 1997, Jeremić co-founded and became the financial manager of the Organization of Serbian Students Abroad (OSSA), the first international Serbian student association, which at the time had several thousand members. He was an active supporter of Otpor! ("Resistance!"), the Serbian civic youth movement that employed non-violent civil disobedience tactics against Milošević's government in the hope of spurning democratic reforms. He became even more determined to see Milošević toppled during and after NATO's bombing of Yugoslavia in the spring and summer of 1999. "This guy ... Milošević," Jeremić recalled thinking, "he has to be removed, because he’s going to get us all buried. If he stays, he’s going to get us all buried."

Following Milošević's resignation in October 2000, largely due to the efforts of groups such as Otpor!, Jeremić worked as an advisor to Tadić, then Yugoslavia's Minister of Telecommunications. In September 2002, Jeremić helped organise the first international investment conference for the Serbian government in New York City, which was held in cooperation with JPMorgan Chase and former Canadian Prime Minister Brian Mulroney, who served as the head of the International Council for Supporting Reforms in Serbia. In early 2003, Yugoslavia was abolished and replaced by the state union of Serbia and Montenegro. That June, Jeremić joined the Ministry of Defense and was appointed Special Envoy for Euro-Atlantic Affairs. In February 2004, he was appointed chairman of the Foreign Affairs Committee of the Democratic Party, and in February 2006 to the Main Board of the Democratic Party. From July 2004 to May 2007, during which Serbia and Montenegro ceased to exist and the two countries became separate states, Jeremić served as a senior foreign policy advisor to Tadić, who by that time had become President of Serbia, leading what The New York Times described as "the most westward-leaning government Serbia has ever had".

=== Foreign Ministry ===
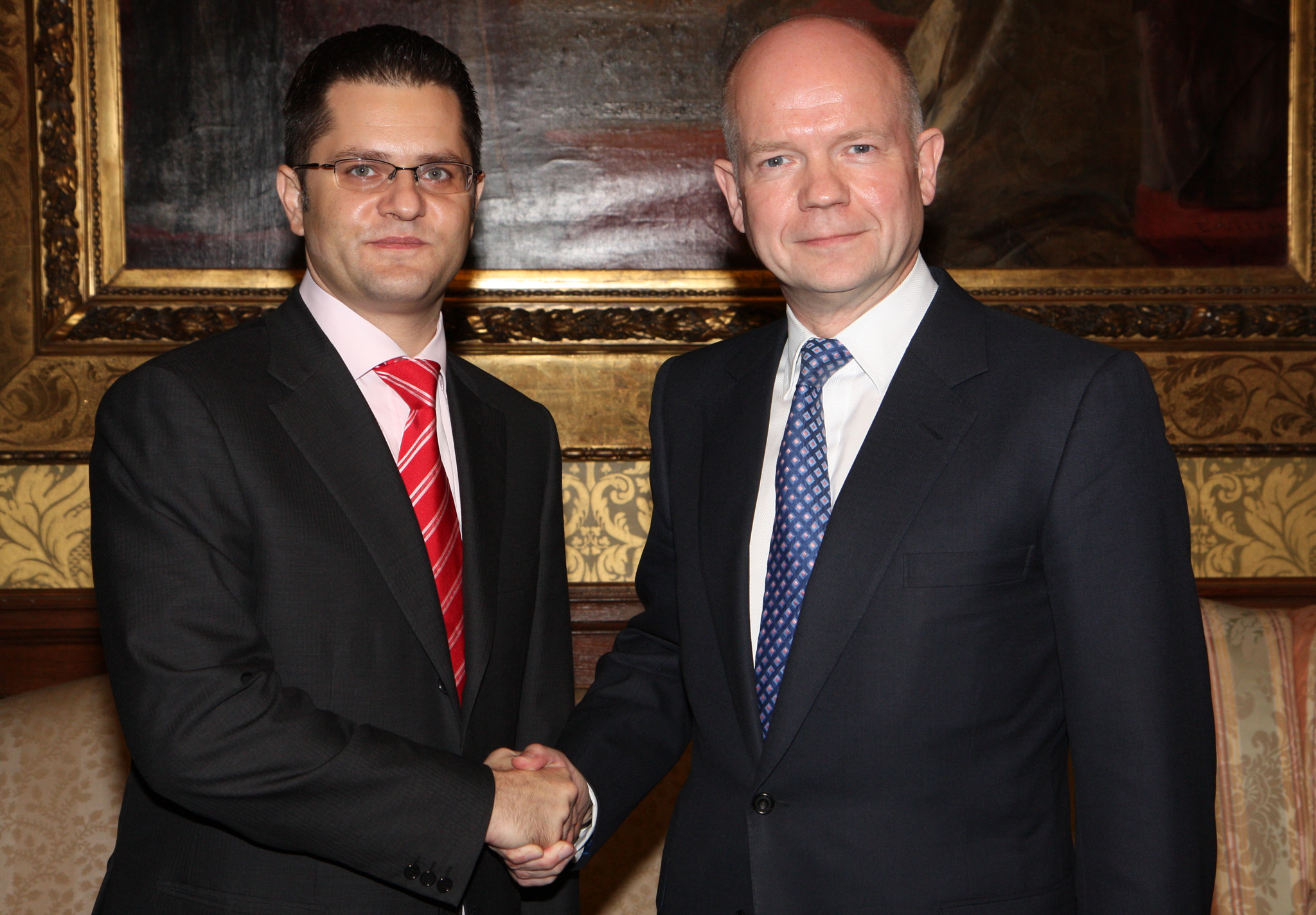
Jeremić with British Foreign Secretary William Hague, November 2011

Jeremić was sworn in as Foreign Minister of Serbia on 15 May 2007. Under Tadić, pundit Šaša Dragojlo notes, the Foreign Ministry's sole task was ensuring that Kosovo remained part of Serbia, and that if it did declare its independence, that it attained only partial recognition. At first, many in Serbia and abroad were sceptical that the 32-year-old Jeremić would make for an effective Foreign Minister. "When you’re young and when ... they see you for the first time," Jeremić remarked, "a lot of them are just kind of surprised. [...] That’s actually a good thing because it opens up their minds. [...] They want to hear what you have to say to them because you’re different."

Following Kosovo's unilateral declaration of independence in February 2008, Jeremić began campaigning against the self-proclaimed state's integration into the international community. In his five years in office, Jeremić boarded 1,000 flights and visited over 100 countries, remarking that he "pretty much knew 90% of the world's foreign ministers". In 2009 alone, he spent over 700 hours—roughly 29 days—in flight. The Economist described Serbian diplomacy under Jeremić as being "on steroids". "His indefatigable travelling," one reporter from the newspaper remarked, "has made most foreign ministers, especially from smaller countries like Serbia, look like sleepy laggards." Jeremić reiterated that his country would not use military force to retake Kosovo, and stressed that Serbia would resort to dialogue and diplomacy to "defend its sovereignty and territorial integrity". He argued that Kosovo has every right to wide-ranging autonomy, but that the Government of Serbia would never accept full-fledged independence. In an address before Israel's Lauder School of Government, Diplomacy and Strategy, he explained:

We have no interest in ruling over the Kosovo Albanian community. We do not want to tax them, nor to police them, nor to have their judicial or ... educational systems reintegrated into ours. Our currency does not have to have a presence in Kosovo. Our military would not have to be there, either. And we would not interfere with their relationship with international financial organizations; with them having separate membership in international sporting federations; or with them having some sort of representation abroad.

In 2009, Jeremić asked the International Court of Justice (ICJ) for a non-binding advisory opinion on the declaration. The court ruled that the declaration of independence was legal in July 2010. Jeremić responded by pushing for a draft resolution at the United Nations which discouraged unilateral secession as a way of resolving territorial disputes. In late July 2010, he met with Secretary-General of the United Nations Ban Ki-moon to discuss the draft resolution. In September 2010, the UN General Assembly adopted the resolution, calling for the dispute to be resolved bilaterally. Jeremić welcomed the General Assembly's decision, as did the European Union's High Commissioner, Catherine Ashton. Jeremić said that he hoped the resolution "would help create an atmosphere conducive to the creation of a comprehensive compact of peace between Serbs and Albanians achieved through good faith dialogue."

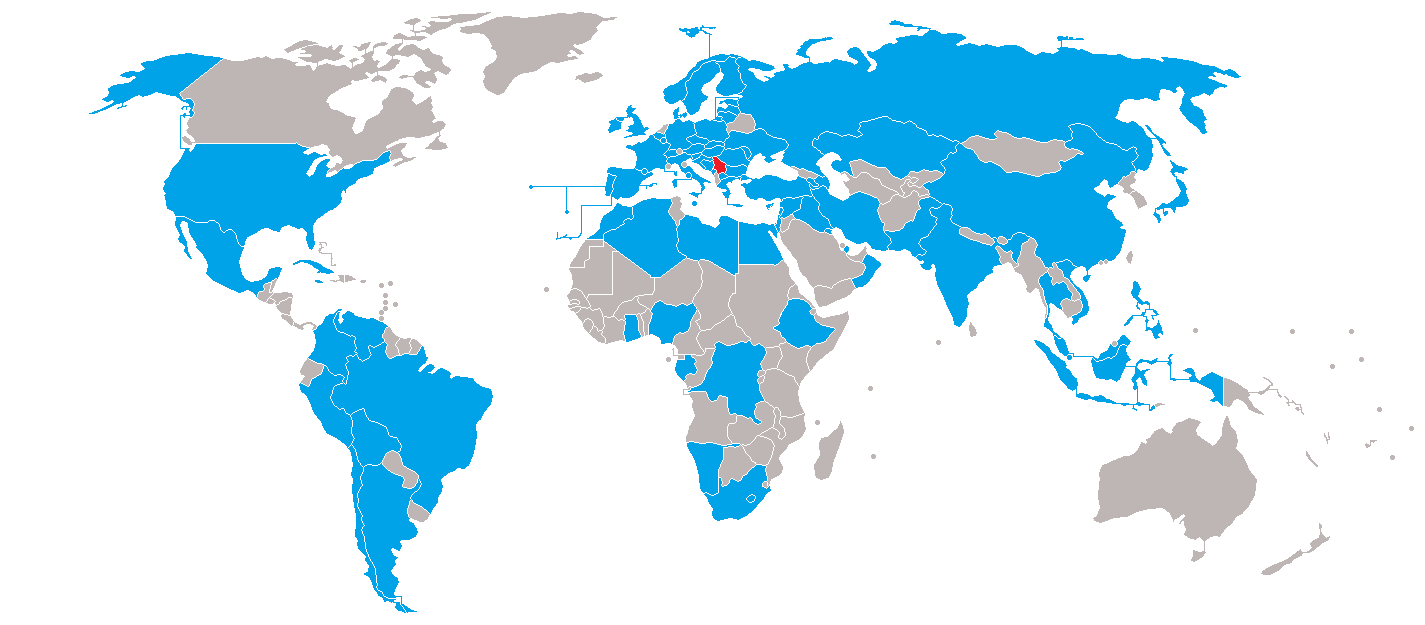
A map of Jeremić's foreign visits

During Jeremić's time in office, relations between Serbia and most of its neighbours improved dramatically. Relations with the European Union and the United States also improved, despite the dispute over Kosovo. In December 2009, the EU lifted visa restrictions on Serbia. Jeremić became the first Serbian citizen to enter the EU without a visa when he crossed the Hungarian border on 19 December and had his passport stamped by Hungarian Foreign Minister Péter Balázs. Jeremić's tenure saw Serbia fulfill its obligations towards the International Criminal Tribunal for the former Yugoslavia (ICTY), which was established by the international community to try individuals suspected of committing war crimes during the Yugoslav Wars. In July 2008, Serbian authorities arrested former Bosnian Serb leader Radovan Karadžić, who was indicted for war crimes, crimes against humanity and genocide by the ICTY and had been in hiding for eleven years. Karadžić was promptly extradited to the ICTY to face trial. Jeremić said the arrest demonstrated that Serbia was fully committed to becoming a member of the European Union. The arrests of Karadžić's military chief, Ratko Mladić, and Croatan Serb rebel leader Goran Hadžić, both of whom had been in hiding, followed three years later.

On 1 March 2012, Serbia was granted candidate status by the European Union, having applied for membership in 2009. The Democratic Party was voted out of office in the Serbian presidential election of May 2012, and Jeremić lost his ministerial role. His last day in office was 27 July 2012, and his final state visit in his capacity as Foreign Minister was to Moscow, where he spoke with Russia's Minister of Foreign Affairs, Sergey Lavrov.

=== United Nations General Assembly presidency ===
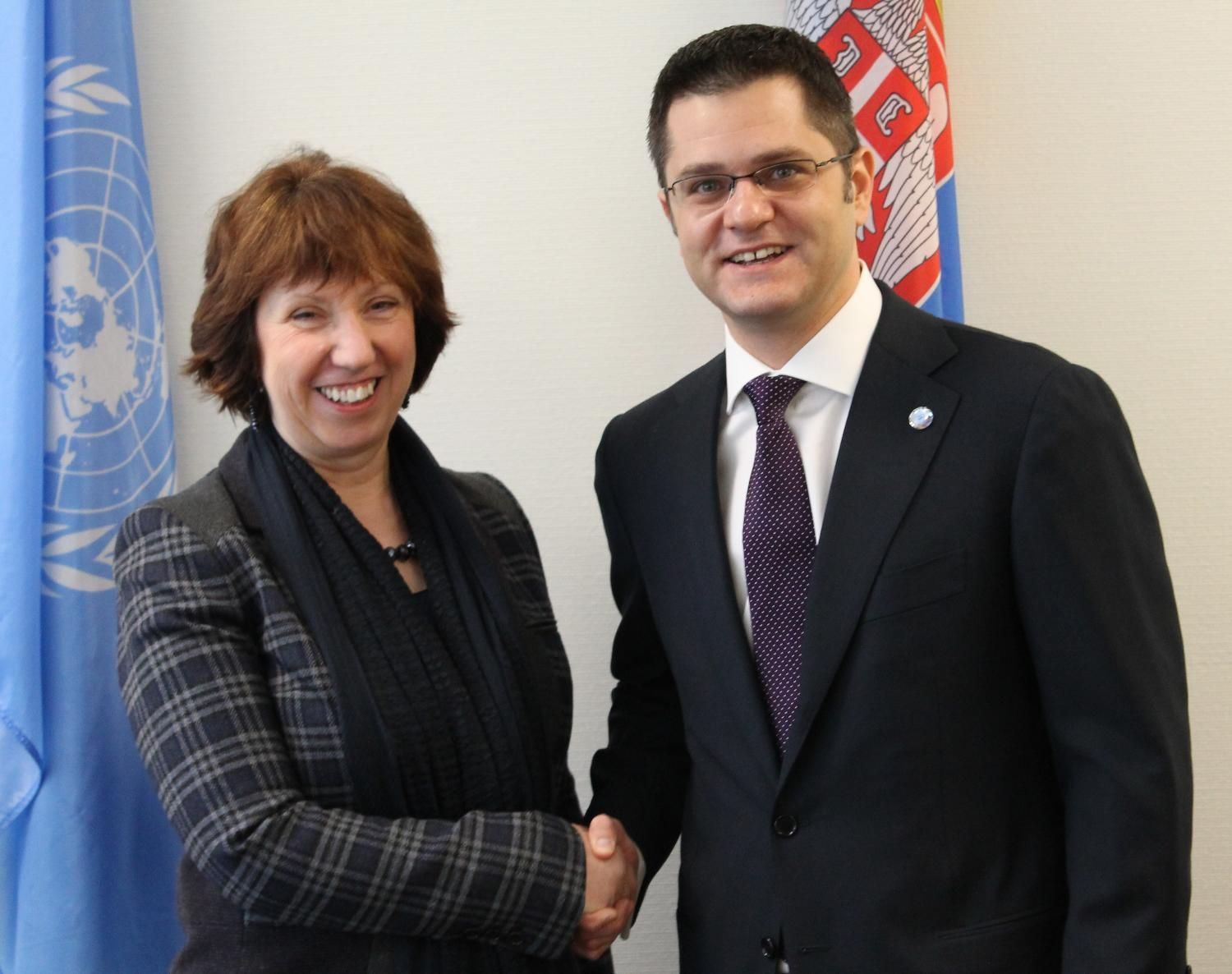
EU High Representative Dame Catherine Ashton and Vuk Jeremić, February 2013

For the United Nations General Assembly's 67th session (commencing in September 2012), the office of President of the General Assembly was slated to be occupied by an individual from Eastern Europe, one of the five regional groups of UN member states. Jeremić ran against Lithuania's Dalius Čekuolis, and was elected president by a simple majority of votes (99–85) among members of the General Assembly. The election marked the first time since 1991 that the General Assembly had to vote in order to select its next president. Jeremić became the youngest president in the General Assembly's history. In his acceptance speech, he stressed the need for international unity in tackling the problems that accompany conflict and instability:

I hope that our joint endeavours may help to bring us closer to the day when humankind shall have assuaged its hurts and abolished its fears; and, in so doing, to further the aspirations of the peoples of the United Nations to save succeeding generations from the scourge of war. May it be the will of God that the next session of the General Assembly goes down in history as one of peace.

During Jeremić's tenure, on 29 November 2012, Palestine was granted non-member observer status in the General Assembly by a vote of 138–9. On 2 April 2013, Jeremić facilitated the General Assembly's adoption of the Arms Trade Treaty (ATT), which was aimed at regulating international conventional weapons commerce. The ATT was passed by a vote of 154–3, with North Korea, Syria and Iran as the only country's voting against it.

To mark Pakistani activist Malala Yousafzai's 16th birthday, Jeremić convened a United Nations Youth Assembly on 12 July 2013. At the Youth Assembly, Yousafzai delivered her first public remarks after being attacked by the Taliban. Jeremić's tenure also saw the General Assembly unanimously adopt Resolution 67/296, proclaiming 6 April as the annual International Day of Sport for Development and Peace. Proclaiming the International Day of Sport was a joint initiative by Jeremić and Jacques Rogge, the president of the International Olympic Committee (IOC). Rogge and UNICEF Goodwill Ambassador Novak Djokovic attended the session as special guests and addressed the General Assembly, Djokovic speaking on behalf of world athletes and Rogge on behalf of the International Olympic Committee. Jeremić's last day as president was 17 September 2013, at which point he was succeeded by John William Ashe of Antigua and Barbuda.

=== CIRSD founder and member of Serbian Parliament ===
After his mandate as the President of the General Assembly expired, Jeremić founded the Center for International Relations and Sustainable Development (CIRSD) in November 2013. In May 2014, he joined the Leadership Council of the United Nations' Sustainable Development Solutions Network (SDSN), which was launched by UN Secretary-General Ban Ki-moon in August 2012.

Jeremić was elected to his country's National Assembly during the 2012 parliamentary election, and his time as Democratic Party legislator overlapped with his tenure as President of the General Assembly. Following the elections, Tadić left the Democratic Party, which came under the leadership Dragan Đilas. As a member of the pro-Tadić camp, Jeremić stepped down from all his positions within the party, though he retained nominal membership. He was expelled from the party on 14 February 2013. He subsequently filed a suit before the Constitutional Court of Serbia, claiming the party's decision was unconstitutional. His appeal was rejected by the Constitutional Court; Jeremić complied with the court's decision and left the party, but kept his parliamentary seat as an independent.

=== United Nations Secretary-General selection ===
As early as October 2012, a number of UN diplomats were mentioning Jeremić as a potential candidate to succeed Ban Ki-moon as secretary-general. On 19 November 2013, former Spanish Foreign Minister Miguel Ángel Moratinos described Jeremić as the best candidate for the post, saying "his election would be great news for the 21st century." He added that Jeremić would "succeed in changing the current structure of the UN and enable it to play a new role in the world." On 12 April 2016, the Government of Serbia officially backed Jeremić's candidacy for UN Secretary-General. Following a General Assembly town hall meeting on 13 April 2016, Jeremić emerged as one of the favourites to win. He put forth a 53-point platform describing the measures he would push for if elected, making him the only candidate to do so. Between July and September, the Security Council held a number of informal, closed-door straw polls where members of the council were asked to indicate whether they "encouraged", "discouraged" or had "no opinion" regarding each of the candidates. He finished the race with the second highest cumulative number of positive votes in the six rounds of straw polls carried out by the UN Security Council, behind eventual winner António Guterres. By the same measure, he was first among Eastern European candidates.

=== Serbian presidential candidacy ===
In January 2017, Jeremić announced that he would run for president in the 2017 election. On 10 March 2017, he officially submitted his nomination as presidential candidate to electoral commission with 14,360 valid signatures as a proof of nomination. His candidacy was endorsed by organisations such as New Serbia, Together for Serbia and Social Democratic Party, People's Movement of Serbia, as well as current and former public officeholders such as Dušan Petrović, leader of the Together for Serbia, former Minister of Justice (2007–2008) and Minister of Agriculture (2011–2012), Sanda Rašković Ivić, member of the National Assembly of Serbia and former leader of the Democratic Party of Serbia, Veroljub Stevanović, leader of the Together for Šumadija and former Mayor of Kragujevac (1996–2000; 2004–2014) and Borislav Novaković, former Mayor of Novi Sad (2000–2004) and vice-president of the Assembly of Vojvodina (2004–2008).

Although many thought that opposition would have better chances against Vučić if united, and considered Saša Janković a better option for a single opposition presidential candidate, Jeremić announced his candidacy nevertheless. He finished fourth, with little less than 6% of the vote.

=== People's Party ===
In the aftermath of the presidential election, though his result of little less than 6% was quite disappointing, he announced formation of a party. He gathered support for such move mainly from conservative intellectuals who were opposing Vučić's government, and were previously tied with DSS (most notably Sanda Rašković-Ivić, a former DSS president). He formed the People's Party in October 2017. The party is positioned as a centre-right political organisation, which cooperates closely with Saša Janković's Movement of Free Citizens. People's Party currently polls around 4%, which is considered a good result since the party was recently formed. In late March 2021, Jeremić stated his opposition to the legalisation of civil unions. In May 2022, Jeremić expressed his opposition to sanctions against Russia following the Russian invasion of Ukraine. After 2023, the party shifted to far right positions, espoused ever more nationalist and anti-EU agenda, with issues of Kosovo's status and Serbian sovereignty-ism at the core of its message. On general elections in December 2023, People's Party won only 0.88 percent of votes.

Since leaving the People's Party presidency, Jeremić has established connections with Aleksandar Vučić and the Serbian Progressive Party.

=== Controversies ===
In 2012, Jeremić made a Tweet likening Albanians to the "Orcs" from the movie The Hobbit.

Several weeks before the Europride 2022 that was held in Belgrade on 17 September, far right and conservative groups, including Serbian Orthodox Church started a campaign for banning the event. Jeremić joined the campaign, stating he is against Belgrade being the gay capital of Europe, and calling the state authorities to ban the event due to the risk of the monkeypox epidemic.

== Personal life ==
Jeremić is married to Nataša Jeremić (née Lekić), a former journalist and news anchor for Serbia's state broadcaster, Radio Television of Serbia. The couple have one daughter, who was born in April 2018. Between 2011 and 2015, Jeremić served as the president of the Tennis Federation of Serbia. Jeremić is a Serbian Orthodox Christian.

Political offices
Preceded by Vuk Drašković	Minister of Foreign Affairs; 2007–2012	Succeeded by Ivan Mrkić
Sporting positions
Preceded by Slobodan Živojinović	President of the Tennis Federation of Serbia; 2011–2015	Succeeded by Mirko Petrović
Positions in intergovernmental organisations
Preceded by Nassir Abdulaziz Al-Nasser	President of the United Nations General Assembly; 2012–2013	Succeeded by John William Ashe
