= 2012 in politics =

These are some of the notable events relating to politics in 2012.

== Events ==
=== January ===
- 22 January and 5 February – the 2012 Finnish presidential election was held with the first round on 22 January, and a run-off on 5 February. Sauli Niinistö of the National Coalition Party won the election, and was inaugurated as President of Finland on March 1.

=== February ===
- 27 February – Amidst the backdrop of the ongoing Yemeni Revolution, President of Yemen Ali Abdullah Saleh handed over his role to Vice President Abdrabbuh Mansur Hadi, ending his 33-year premiership.

=== March ===
- 22 March – President of Mali Amadou Toumani Touré, is ousted in a coup d'état after mutinous soldiers attack government offices.

=== April ===
- April 11 – Kim Jong Un was elected as First Secretary of the Workers' Party of Korea, succeeding his father Kim Jong Il, who died on 17 December 2011, and was posthumously conferred as "Eternal leader".
- The World Bank presidential election was won by Jim Yong Kim.

=== June ===
- The United Nations General Assembly presidential election was held.

=== October ===
- The United Nations Security Council election was held.

=== November ===
- 6 November – Democrat Barack Obama won re-election with his incumbent Joe Biden, re-electing them as President of the United States for another four years.
- 15 November - Xi Jinping succeeded Hu Jintao as General Secretary of the Chinese Communist Party and became China's new paramount leader.

=== December ===
- 16 December – The 2012 Japanese general election was held, with main opposition Liberal Democratic Party, led by Shinzo Abe, winning the election, ousting the Democratic Party of Japan-led government which they have won in 2009, and returned to power in National Diet, which has been the case since. Abe was reinstated as Prime Minister since 2007.

== Deaths ==
=== January ===
- Manuel Fraga Iribarne, Spanish politician (born 1922)
- Oscar Luigi Scalfaro, 9th President of Italy (born 1918)

=== March ===
- Francisco Xavier do Amaral, 1st President of East Timor (born 1937)
- Ċensu Tabone, 4th President of Malta (born 1913)
- George Tupou V, King of Tonga (born 1948)

=== April ===
- Miguel de la Madrid, 52nd President of Mexico (born 1934)
- Ahmed Ben Bella, 1st President of Algeria (born 1918)

=== May ===
- May 11 - Alfred Diamant, American political scientist and academic (born 1917)

== See also ==
- Local electoral calendar 2012
- National electoral calendar 2012
- Supranational electoral calendar 2012
- List of foreign ministers in 2012
