= 2012 supranational electoral calendar =

This supranational electoral calendar for the year 2012 lists the supranational elections held in 2012. All the elections are non-popularly elected.

== April ==
- 16: World Bank president

== June ==
- 8: UNGA president

== July ==
- 15: African Union Chairperson

== October ==
- UNSC

== November ==
- Human Rights Council
