= 4th BRICS summit =

2012 international summit in New Dehli, India

4th BRICS Summit चतुर्थ ब्रिक्स शिखर सम्मेलन
- 29 March 2012

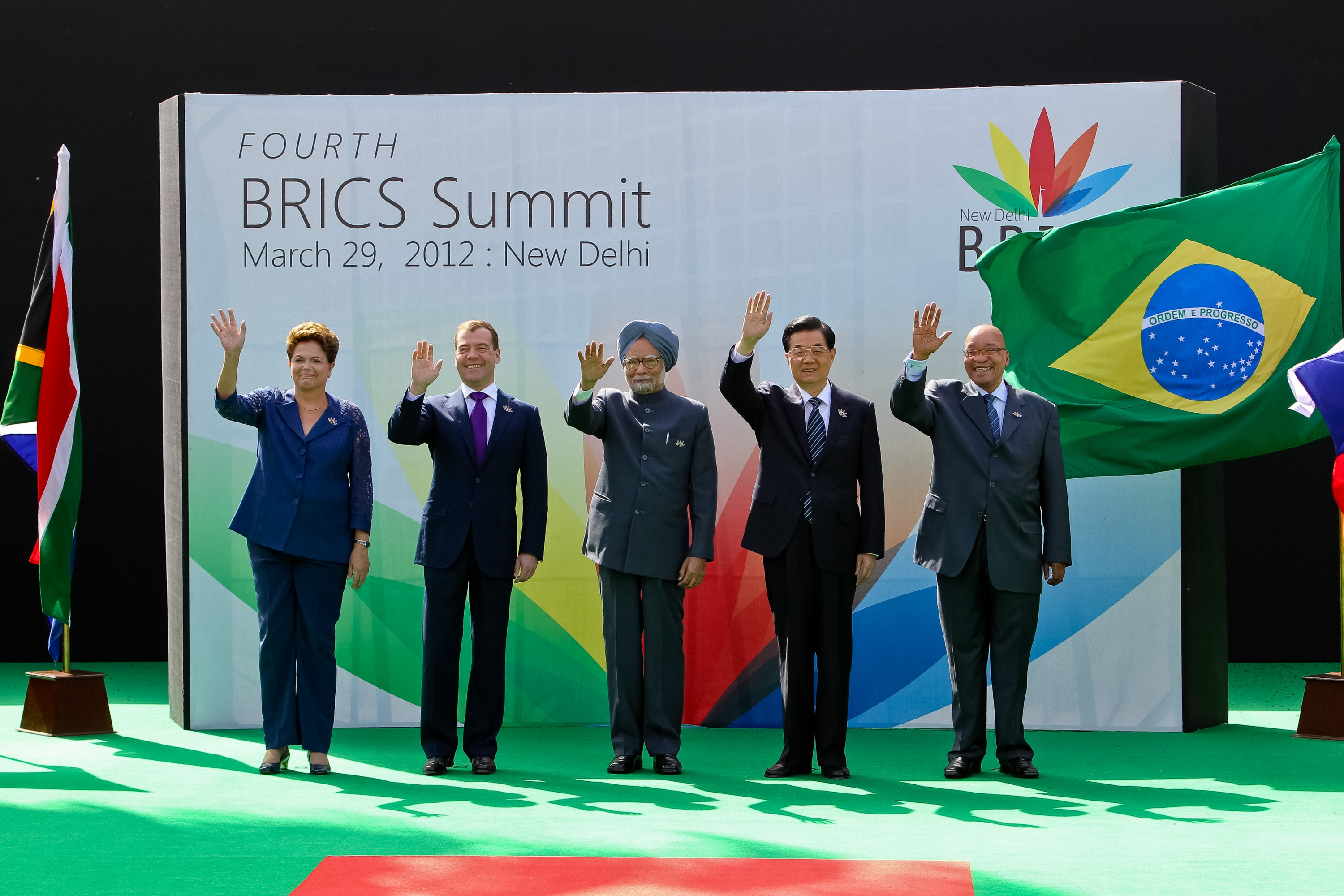
- Official summit logo
- Host country: India
- Cities: New Delhi
- Venues: Taj Hotel
- Participants: Brazil; Russia; India; China; South Africa

The 2012 BRICS summit was the fourth annual BRICS summit, an international relations conference attended by the heads of state or heads of government of the five member states Brazil, Russia, India, China and South Africa. The summit was held at Taj Hotel in New Delhi, India on 29 March 2012 and began at 10:00 Indian Standard Time. This is the first time that India has hosted a BRICS summit. The theme of the summit was "BRICS Partnership for Global Stability, Security and Prosperity".

== Preparations ==
=== Logo ===
Preparations for the summit began with the announcement from the Ministry of External Affairs, India about a competition to choose the official logo for the meeting. The logo was expected to "bring out the essence of this grouping of countries, which has received unprecedented global attention in recent years and now occupies a prominent space in the global political and economic landscape." A specially-constituted jury announced the winning design on 10 February 2012 as the submission of Sonesh Jain, an architecture student of the Indian Institute of Technology Roorkee. The logo is a symbolic representation of a peacock with "colours suggesting resurgence and renewal". Officials also commented that the BRICS logo drew inspiration from the lotus in addition to the peacock.

The logo caused controversy regarding its similarity to that of the National Broadcasting Company. The Ministry of External Affairs said that there should have been a more careful selection process, but defended the logo by saying that there were more differences than similarities.

=== Security ===
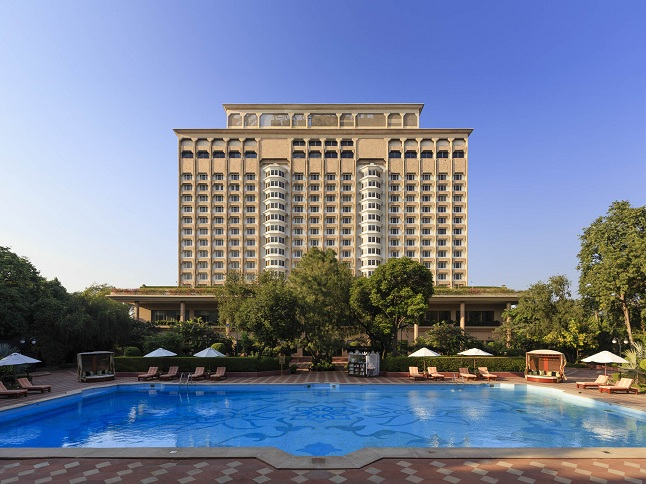
The Taj Mahal Hotel, New Delhi, the location of the summit.

Hosting the summit involved elaborate security arrangements in the city. 2,000 police personnel and National Security Guard commandos were deployed throughout the city's arterial areas, with special emphasis on the summit venue. The venue's security involved a three-tier arrangement handled by the Delhi Police and the embassy officials of the visiting nations, and involved body checks and metal detectors. To ensure the security of the attending delegates, the floors above and below the rooms to be occupied were left vacant. In addition, the entire hotel was occupied by the BRICS summit, and guests were re-directed to other hotels. Security personnel were posted even on the rooftops of the venue.

== Pre-summit events ==
During 4–6 March 2012, the Delhi-based public policy organisation Observer Research Foundation conducted the 4th BRICS Academic Forum, which involved the participation of approximately 60 scholars from all five states. The forum was held to generate ideas and proposals, which would be put forward to the attending state heads for further consideration. At the end of the forum, 18 recommendations were put forward for increasing the effectiveness of the group. A BRICS business forum, organised by the Federation of Indian Chamber of Commerce and Industry, Confederation of Indian Industry and Associated Chambers of Commerce and Industry of India, took place the day before the leaders official summit.

== Participants ==
Hu arrived in New Delhi on 28 March 2012 along with a delegation of senior ministers which included Foreign Minister Yang Jiechi, State Councillor Dai Bingguo as well as business executives. Zuma's delegation included the Minister of Trade and Industry, Rob Davies and business executives. All five trade ministers were present as well.

The heads of state/heads of government of the five countries participated in the summit.

**Core BRICS members** Host state and leader are shown in bold text.
Member		Represented by	Title
(Brazil)	Brazil	Dilma Rousseff	President
(Russia)	Russia	Dmitry Medvedev	President
(India)	**India**	**Manmohan Singh**	**Prime Minister**
(China)	China	Hu Jintao	General Secretary; President
(South Africa)	South Africa	Jacob Zuma	President

== Gallery of participating leaders ==
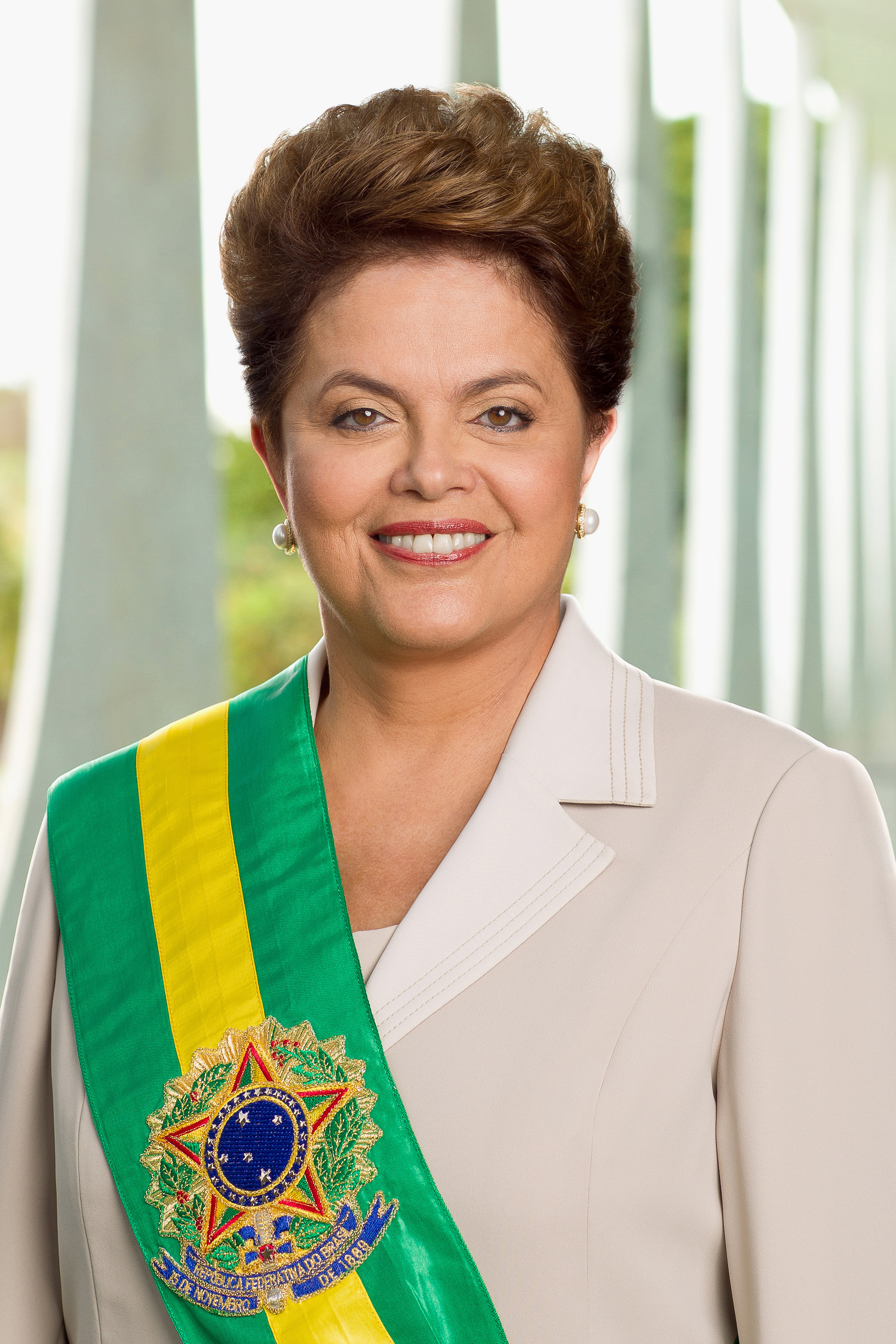
**(Brazil) Dilma Rousseff**
President of Brazil

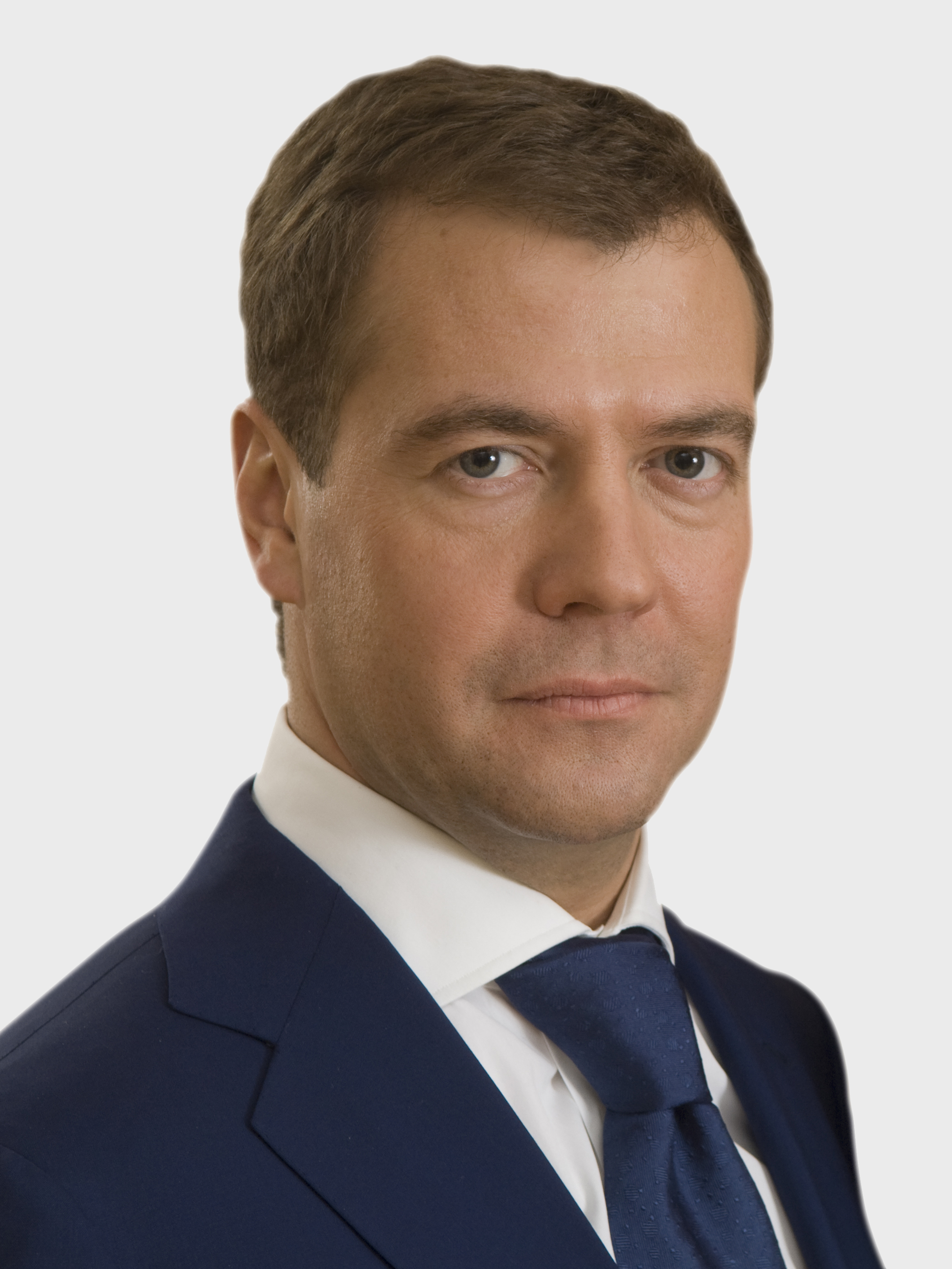
**(Russia) Dmitry Medvedev**
President of Russia

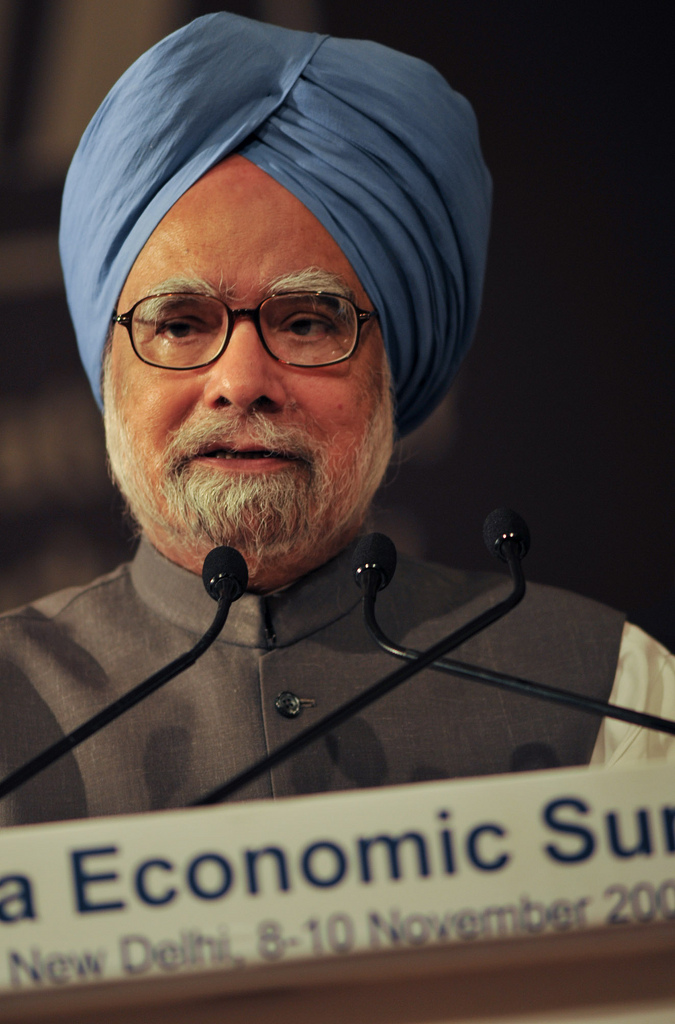
**(India)** Manmohan Singh
**Prime Minister of India (Host)**

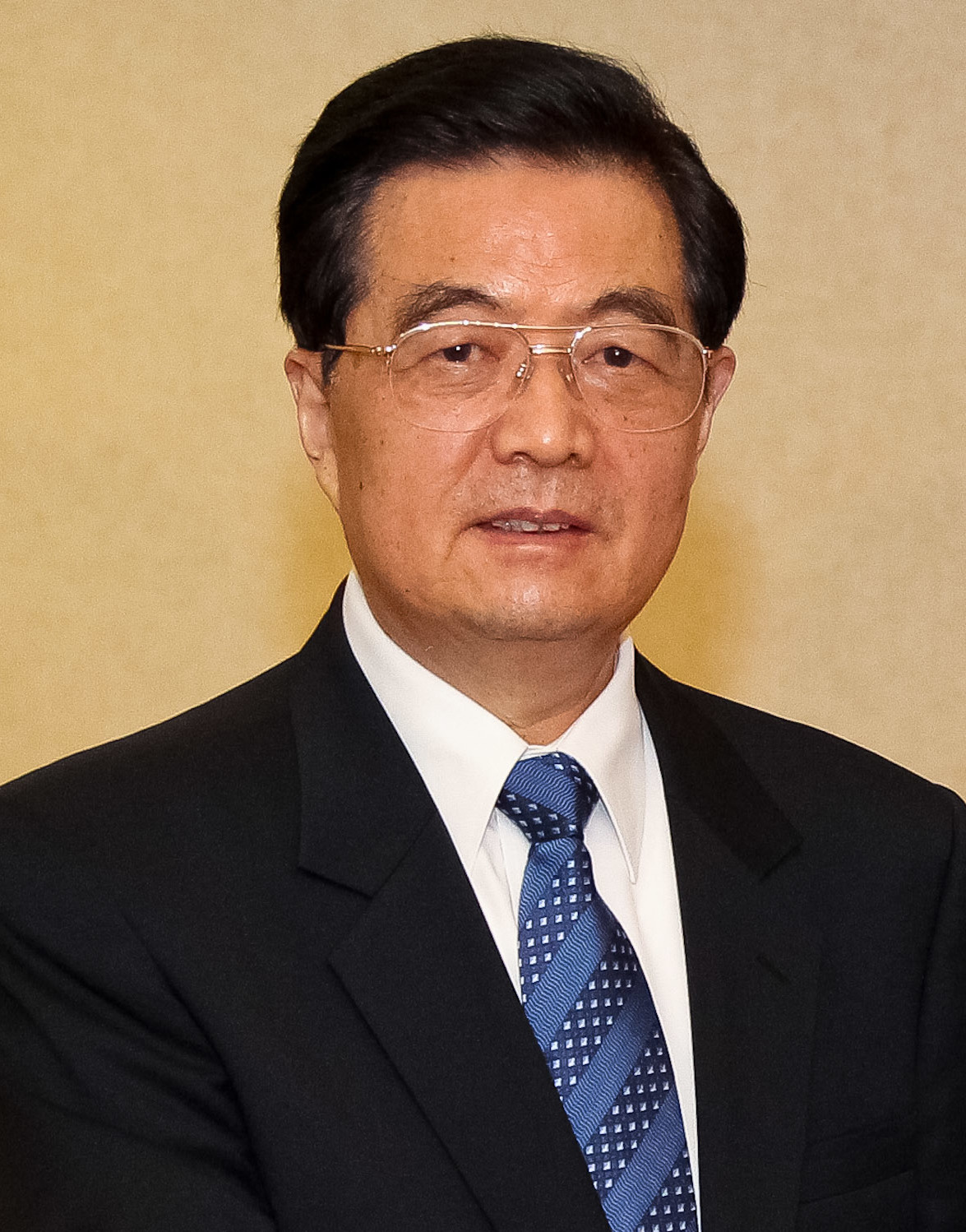
**(China) Hu Jintao**
CCP General Secretary and President

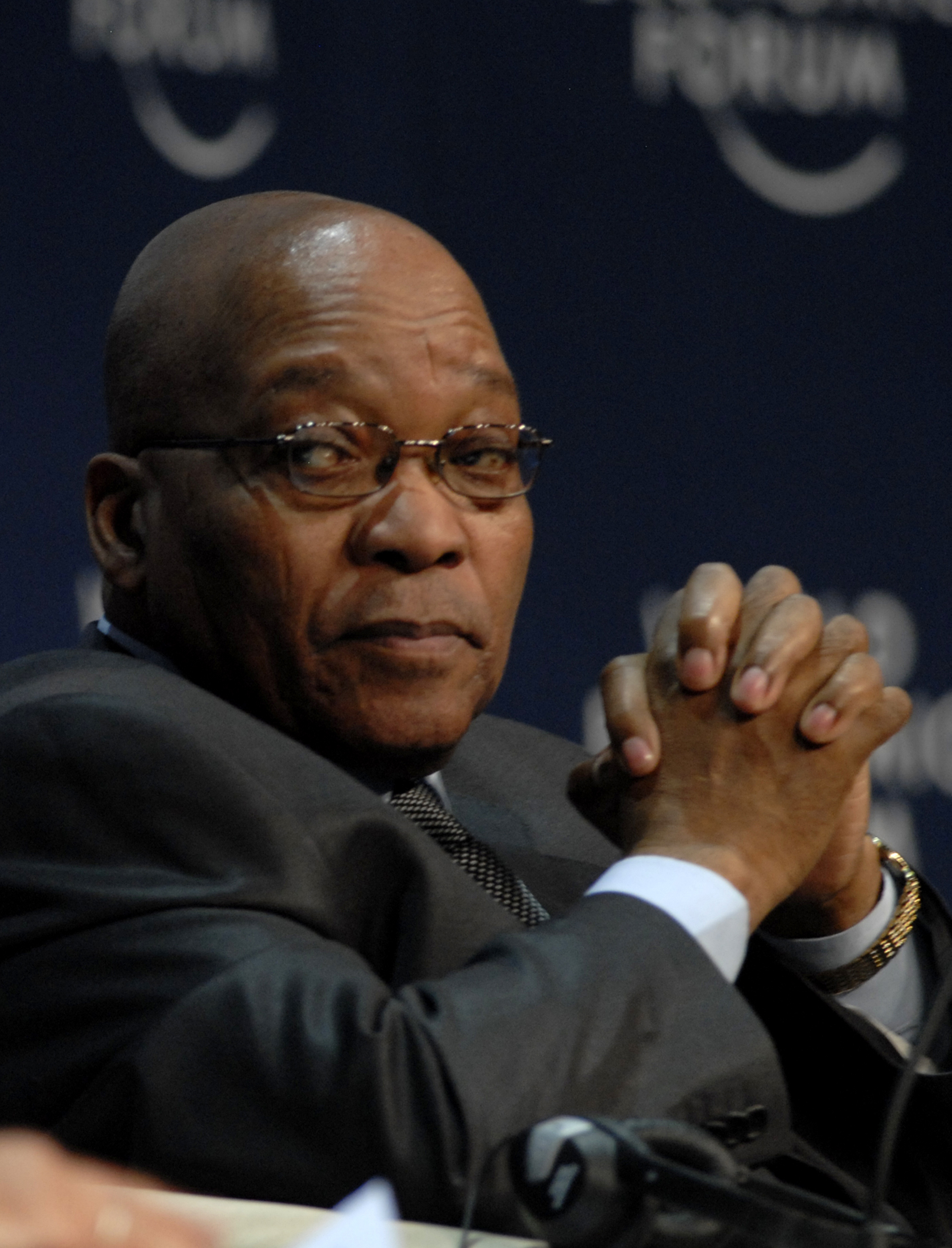
**(South Africa) Jacob Zuma**
President of South Africa

== Common issues ==
=== Development bank ===
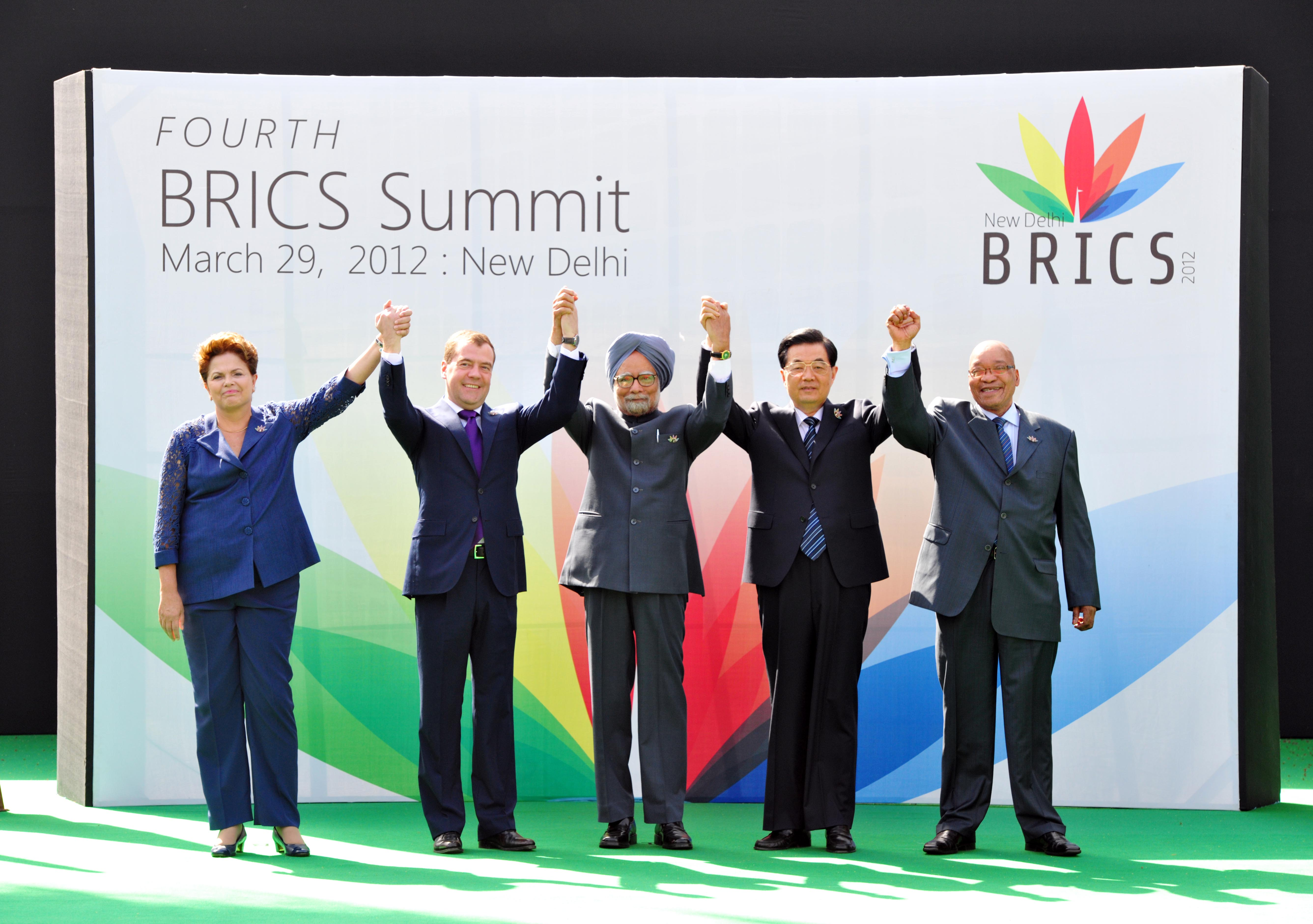
The BRICS leaders at the summit venue; (from left) Rousseff, Medvedev, Singh, Hu and Zuma

The main agenda for the summit was the creation of a new development bank. The idea for setting up such a bank was put forward by India, as a sign of firming the power of the group and increasing its influence in global decision-making; Sudhir Vyas, a senior Indian official, said that the idea for a BRICS bank had been "in the air for some time."

The aims of the bank would include: funding development and infrastructure projects in developing and least developed countries; lending, in the long term, during global financial crises such as the Eurozone crisis; and issuing convertible debt, which could be bought by the central banks of all the member states and hence act as a vessel for risk-sharing.

Economic experts predicted several beneficent effects of such a bank. Such a bank would allow successful implementation of regional development projects, with increased efficiency and transparency. Brazilian Trade Minister Fernando Pimentel said that the bank "would be a very powerful financial tool to improve trade opportunities, and may be a major step to support the EU to overcome its financial crisis."

In the Delhi Declaration at the end of the summit, the BRICS announced the setting up of the bank, described as a "BRICS-led South-South development bank." The finance ministers of the member states were directed to conduct feasibility studies of the initiative and to submit their reports at the next BRICS summit. Pimentel said that the proposed bank was not meant as a sign of abandonment of existing global financial institutions, but that it was a response to current economic necessities. Vyas commented that the BRICS would determine the capital structure and that the initiative would take some time to get started.

=== Other issues ===
Zuma's office said that South Africa would seek to advance African interests in seeking support for infrastructure projects and industrialisation initiatives, as well as call for reform in multilateral institutions.

== Conclusions ==
=== Multilateral financial institutions ===
All five countries called for an urgent need to implement the 2010 Governance and Quota Reform before the 2012 International Monetary Fund – World Bank Annual Meeting. The countries also want the comprehensive review of the quota formula to reflect economic weights and enhance the voice and representation of emerging market and developing countries by January 2013.

All five countries also called for candidatures from developing world for the position of the President of the World Bank reiterating that the heads of IMF and the World Bank should be selected through an open and merit-based process. The call came weeks before the World Bank's presidential election which would, for the first time, feature non-United States candidates. China's Hu said: "We are committed to stepping up exchanges with other countries on global economic governance reforms and increasing representation of developing countries." Manmohan Singh added that "while some progress has been made in international financial institutions, there is lack of movement on the political side. BRICS should speak with one voice on important issues such as the reform of the UN Security Council."

=== Trade and currency ===
To promote trade in local currencies, the BRICS countries signed the Master Agreement on Extending Credit Facility in Local Currency and the Multilateral Letter of Credit Confirmation Facility Agreement to replace the United States dollar as the main unit of trade between them. The trade ministers also said that tightening intra-BRICS trade would help as an antidote to the European sovereign debt crisis. The trade ministers also called for collective action to fight the European and United States economic downturns. At the BRICS Business Forum, India's Commerce and Industry Minister Anand Sharma said that the "adversity of financial crisis is being faced by all. There is a need to work together to overcome this problem." His Chinese counterpart Chen Deming added that both economic problems were affecting all states and decreased Chinese exports: "I am sure they will recover. There is a need to prevent the EU crisis quickly before it gets worse. There has been a decline in demand in the European markets. Despite this we have to sustain a high level of growth." Russian Minister for Economic Development and Trade Elvira Nabioullina added that "the world has to stop accumulating risks. There is a need to work closer."

In order to bring the economies of BRICS closer, all members agreed to launch a benchmark equity index derivative allowing investors in one BRICS country to bet on the performance of stock markets in the other four members without currency risk. The indices will be cross-listed in BRICS' flagship stock exchanges from 30 March.

=== Foreign policy issues ===
All five countries called for the international community to continue development projects in Afghanistan for 10 years after the ISAF withdraws most of its combat troops by the end of 2014.

They also condemned the Western world's pressure tactics on Iran to make other countries adhere to their restrictions on trade ties and said dialogue alone could resolve the nuclear issues. The group added that the Syrian uprising could also only be resolved through dialogue. They warned against any military intervention in Syria by the West or by Israel in Iran. They added that a war with Iran would have "disastrous consequences." China's Trade Minister Chen Deming said that the "rise [in the price] of crude oil has impacted all countries. The Iran issue has become an issue for all. We need to continue with normal relations with Iran, but, at the same time, we respect UN resolution. We hope that unilateral movement by one country will not affect other countries."

== Bilateral initiatives ==
India and China launched the "India-China Friendship and Cooperation" year in the summit. Chinese leader Hu Jintao that it was China's "unswerving policy" to develop bilateral ties as he put forward a five-point proposal in an effort to improve strategic ties between the two states. Chinese Foreign Ministry spokesman Hong Lei said of Hu's reaction that he thought "there is a great cooperation potential and prospect of development for China-India relations. China hopes to work with India to seize development opportunities, step up development, jointly respond to challenges and make greater contribution to peace and prosperity of Asia and beyond." Indian Prime Minister Manmohan Singh responded by saying that "India hopes to maintain high-level exchange of visits with China, deepen strategic mutual trust, expand win-win cooperation and hope to make strategic economic dialogue between the two countries a success."

Both states agreed to initiate dialogue over issues in West Asia, Central Asia and Africa as confidence building measures towards enhancement of political interaction. They also discussed border disputes with a conclusion to maintain the status quo peace and stability. On the economic front, Hu stated that he would work towards facilitating Indian exports to China; Singh called for Chinese investments in the Indian manufacturing and infrastructure sectors.

== Controversies ==
=== Protests ===
On 26 March, a Tibetan activist named Jamphel Yeshi set himself on fire at a rally in Delhi and subsequently died of his burns two days later. Yeshi was given a "martyr's funeral" by several Tibetan exile organisations; a rally was held in Dharamshala in his memory. On 28 March, protesters attempted to storm into the hotel where Hu was staying, prompting an increase in security for the officials. Around ten Tibetan activists unfurled a Tibetan flag near the hotel, and attempted to march towards the summit venue but were detained by the police. Protesters were also present at the United Nations office where the Tibetan Youth Congress submitted memorandums to the embassies of the participating states. Similar protests were also held at Khan Market and the Jantar Mantar, prompting a heavy police presence in such areas. Police camps were set up in certain colonies of Tibetan refugees in Delhi. Almost 300 protesters were arrested for breaking laws during their anti-China protests.

China responded strongly to the protests, and accused the exiles of pushing "extreme and radical views by glorifying and instigating extreme behavior." Chinese spokesperson Luo Zhaohui termed the protests as "political" and "inconsistent with the teachings of Buddhism." Luo expressed regret over the loss of life and praised the Indian government's efforts to "[ensure] the safe and smooth holding" of the summit. The state-run China Tibet Online made a number of statements against the Dalai Lama, claiming that he was "controlled by USA" and that his relatives worked for the Central Intelligence Agency. It pointed out "similarities" between the Dalai Lama's activities and the "uncontrolled and cruel Nazis" during World War II. It also claimed that he wanted Tibet to become his "property" and Tibetans his "slaves", by dividing China and "restoring Tibetan serfdom." The report was subsequently relayed by Xinhua. The Simon Wiesenthal Center criticised the comparison, calling it a "double slander", on the premise that the Dalai Lama's tactics are antithetical to the actions of the Nazi regime. The government of India perceived the disruptions as a loss of face and acted to detain protesters, cordon off areas with Tibetan populations, and provide police escorts. However, despite warnings, the Tibetan Youth Congress announced that they would continue to protest in the city. During the Rajya Sabha's Zero Hour, the Bharatiya Janata Party's Balbir Punj condemned the arrests of protesters, labeling it a "violation of people's fundamental rights".

The day before the summit, the Parliament of the Central Tibetan Administration called on the other BRICS members to discuss the issue at the summit as they felt that the situation in Tibet continued to deteriorate amidst China's use of "brutal methods" against peaceful protests.

=== Traffic ===
A day prior to the summit, traffic restrictions were imposed in Sardar Patel Marg so as to allow proper movement of the visiting dignitaries. Such restrictions were expected to affect traffic at major city roads, India Gate and Rajiv Chowk. However, despite an earlier announcement stating that restrictions would be imposed in the evening, the restrictions were placed by the afternoon. As a result, commuters were left stranded due to traffic blocks. Despite advisories from the police, there was confusion on the roads. Some people reported that they were held up at the roads for several hours. The blocked roads were also used by commuters travelling from satellite towns into Delhi, thus forcing the people to find alternate options for traveling. The Delhi Police's advice of avoiding the blocked routes and finding alternate routes was met with criticism as such measures would add considerably to commuting time. Commuter displeasure was also expressed on social networking sites like Facebook. The traffic conditions in the city made many commuters use the Delhi Metro to reach their destinations.

== Reactions ==
Mark Toner, a spokesman for the United States Department of State, said that it had "reviewed the leaders' Delhi declaration and believe that their efforts to engage in global multilateral institutions productively can only strengthen the international system", adding that its efforts to support the global economy and development in Afghanistan were welcomed. However, in regards to Iran, he said that U.S. President Barack Obama "has said that no option has been taken off the table, he's also been very clear that there's still... time for a diplomatic solution."
