= 2012 World Bank Group presidential election =

World Bank Group election, 2012
- 16 April 2012
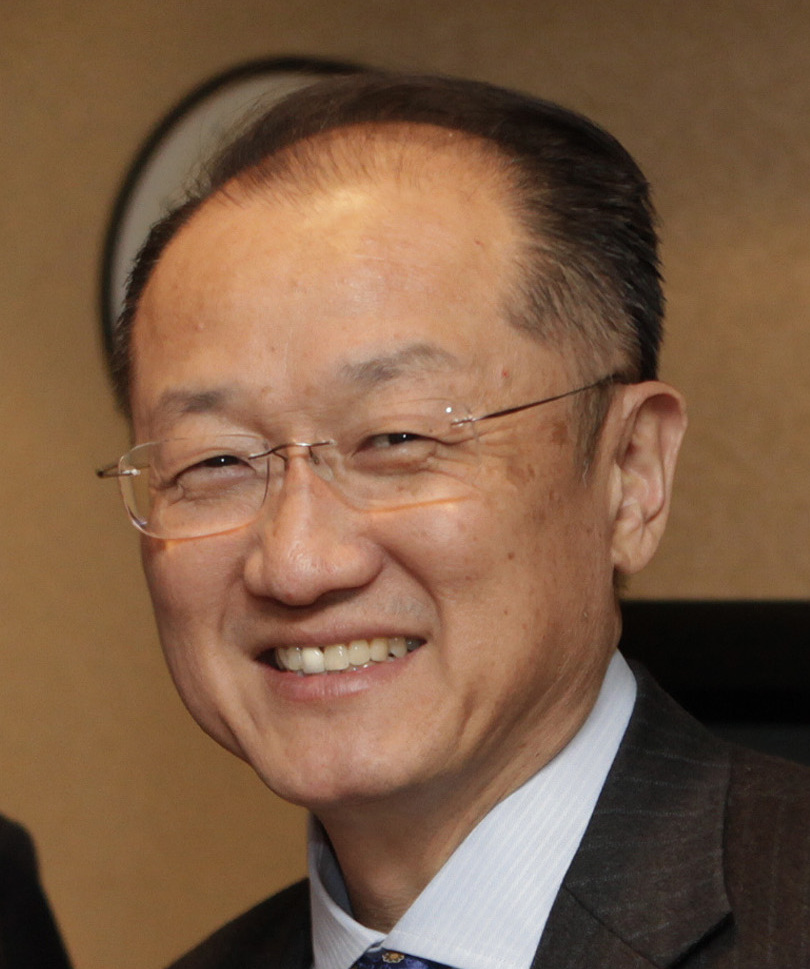

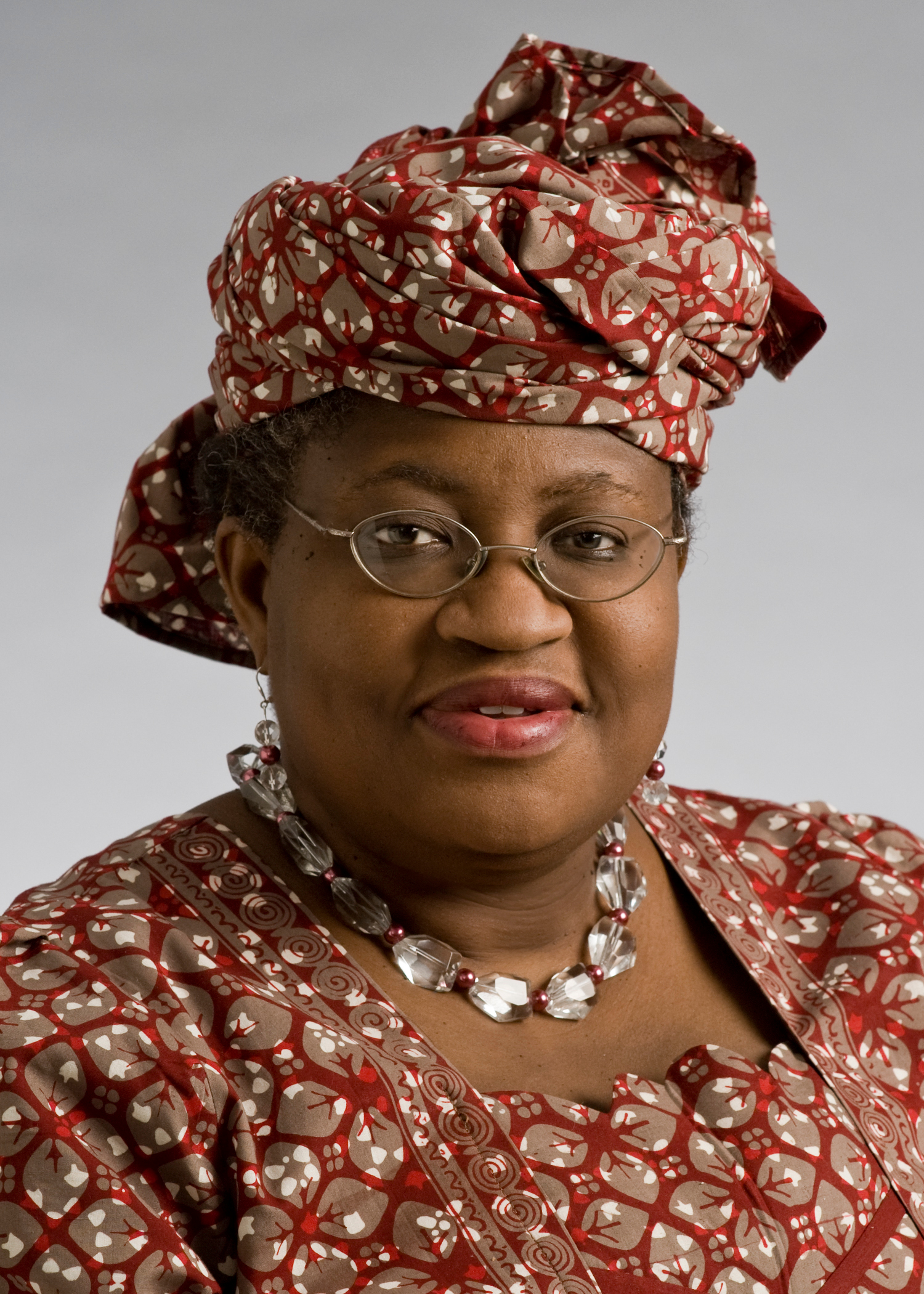
Nominee	Jim Yong Kim	Ngozi Okonjo-Iweala
President before election
Robert B. Zoellick
Elected President
Jim Yong Kim

An indirect presidential election was held on 16 April 2012 to choose a new president of the World Bank Group to replace Robert Zoellick, whose term expired in June. Although the organisation has always had presidents from, and nominated by, the United States, this election featured the nomination of two non-United States candidates for the first time, originating, respectively, from Nigeria and Colombia. Though the Colombian José Antonio Ocampo withdrew his candidacy in the final stages, the Nigerian Finance Minister Ngozi Okonjo-Iweala remained in the race. Eventually, and amid controversy, the US nominee Jim Yong Kim was announced as the new president on 16 April.

== Background ==
In accordance with their financial contributions to the organisation, member states have a form of proportional representation in voting. As of a rule change in 2010, voting shares now stand at United States of America (15.85%), Japan (6.84%), China (4.42%), Germany (4.00%), United Kingdom (3.75%), France (3.75%), India (2.91%), Russia (2.77%), Saudi Arabia (2.77%) and Italy (2.64%). Among countries with recently increased voting power are South Korea, Turkey, Mexico, Singapore, Greece, Brazil, India and Spain. By contrast, many developed countries lost vote share, as did a few developing countries, such as Nigeria. In 2011, a unanimous decision by the 187 members agreed to a "transparent, merit-based process."

Under a tacit agreement since the founding of the World Bank, a United States citizen has always led the organisation, while a European citizen has always led the "sister organisation," the International Monetary Fund. The president is also the chairman of the World Bank's executive board.

== Electorate ==
The five nominated and 20 elected members of the executive board are the electors eligible to participate in the selection of the new president (this was the first presidential election with 25 voting members after one more member was added to the board on 1 November 2010). The last day for filing of nominations was 23 March, after which the executive board would conduct interviews with the candidates.

The five largest shareholders of the World Bank – the United States, Japan, Germany, France and the United Kingdom, respectively – each appoint an executive director. China, Russia and Saudi Arabia also elect their own members. The rest of the executive board is elected by the other members operating within multi-country constituencies.

At the time of the election the 25 members of the executive board and their constituents were:

Members of the World Bank executive board in 2012
Nos	Member	Nationality	Constituency	Notes
1	Ian H. Solomon	US	US*	
2	Nobumitsu Hayashi	Japan	Japan	
3	Susanna M. D. Moorehead	UK	UK	
4	Ambroise Fayolle	France	France	
5	Ingrid G. Hoven	Germany	Germany	
6	Javed Talat		Afghanistan, Algeria, Ghana, Islamic Republic of Iran, Morocco, Pakistan, Tunisia	
7	Marie-Lucie Morin	Canada	Antigua and Barbuda, Bahamas, Barbados, Belize, Canada, Dominica, Grenada, Guyana, Ireland, Jamaica, St. Kitts and Nevis, St. Lucia, St. Vincent and the Grenadines	
8	Felix A. Camarasa		Argentina, Bolivia, Chile, Paraguay, Peru, Uruguay	
9	John Whitehead		Australia, Cambodia, Kiribati, South Korea, Marshall Islands, Micronesia, Mongolia, New Zealand, Palau, Papua New Guinea, Samoa, Solomon Islands, Tuvalu, Vanuatu	
10	Konstantin Huber	Austria	Austria, Belarus, Belgium, Czech Republic, Hungary, Kosovo, Luxembourg, Slovakia, Slovenia, Turkey	
11	Merza Hasan		Bahrain, Egypt, Jordan, Iraq, Kuwait, Lebanon, Libya, Maldives, Oman, Qatar, Syria, United Arab Emirates, Yemen	
12	Mukesh N. Prasad	India	Bangladesh, Bhutan, India, Sri Lanka	
13	Agapito Mendes Dias		Benin, Burkina Faso, Cameroon, Cape Verde, Central African Republic, Chad Comoros, Congo, Democratic Republic of Congo, Djibouti, Equatorial Guinea, Gabon, Guinea-Bissau, Guinea, Ivory Coast, Madagascar, Mali, Mauritius, Niger, Sao Tome and Principe, Senegal, Togo	
14	Hassan A. Taha		Botswana, Burundi, Eritrea, Ethiopia, Gambia, Kenya, Lesotho, Liberia, Malawi, Mozambique, Namibia, Rwanda, Seychelles, Sierra Leone, Somalia, Sudan, Swaziland, Tanzania, Uganda, Zambia, Zimbabwe	
15	Rogério Studart		Brazil, Colombia, Dominican Republic, Ecuador, Haiti, Panama, Philippines, Suriname, Trinidad and Tobago*	
16	Hekinus Manao		Brunei Darussalam, Fiji, Indonesia, Laos, Malaysia, Myanmar, Nepal, Singapore, Thailand, Tonga, Vietnam	
17	Shaolin Yang	China	China	
18	Marta Maria Garcia Jaurequi		Costa Rica, El Salvador, Guatemala, Honduras, Mexico, Nicaragua, Spain, Venezuela	
19	Rudolf Jan Treffers		Armenia, Bosnia and Herzegovina, Bulgaria, Croatia, Cyprus, Georgia, Israel, Macedonia, Moldova, Montenegro, Netherlands, Romania, Ukraine	
20	Anna Brandt		Denmark, Estonia, Finland, Iceland, Latvia, Lithuania, Norway, Sweden	
21	Piero Cipollone		Albania, Greece, Italy, Malta, Portugal, San Marino, Timor-Leste	
22	Abdulrahman M. Almofadhi	Saudi Arabia	Saudi Arabia	
23	Vadim Nikolaevich Grishin	Russia	Russia	
24	Jorg Frieden		Azerbaijan, Kazakhstan, Kyrgyzstan, Poland, Serbia, Switzerland, Tajikistan, Turkmenistan, Uzbekistan	
25	Renosi Mokate		Angola, Nigeria, South Africa*	
Total	25		187	

== Candidates ==
The three official candidates were Korean-American Jim Yong Kim, the president of Dartmouth College; Nigerian Ngozi Okonjo-Iweala, the Finance Minister of Nigeria; and Colombian Jose Antonio Ocampo, the director at the Economic and Political Development Concentration at the School of International and Public Affairs, Columbia University.

Other potential candidates included the self-declared Jeffrey Sachs, who criticised the institution for failing in its development efforts and said that someone who understands development and sustainability ought to be president. He was supported by the US vice-president of the Institute for Economics and Peace, Michael Shank.

The Huffington Post suggested that the US administration gave serious consideration to nominating former Treasury Secretary Lawrence Summers for the position. According to Al Jazeera, over a dozen other possible nominees were considered by the United States, including Secretary of State Hillary Clinton and the department's spokeswoman Victoria Nuland.

== Campaign ==
Before announcing Kim's candidature, the United States' Treasury Department said that "the United States continues its leadership role in the World Bank." US President Barack Obama said of Kim that "he's worked from Asia to Africa to the Americas – from capitals to small villages. The World Bank is one of the most powerful tools we have to reduce poverty and raise standards of living around the globe, and Kim’s personal experience and years of service make him an ideal candidate for this job." His decision was read as a surprise, as Kim had a lower profile than the other potential candidates that had been discussed in advance, but was interpreted by the Associated Press as an attempt by Obama to fend off challenges by developing countries eager to end the US control of the position. Kim also had early support from Canada and his native South Korea. Jeffrey Sachs withdrew his nomination, which was supported by a group of small countries, and backed Kim saying: "Dr Jim Kim is a superb nominee for the World Bank presidency. I support his nomination 100 percent. I congratulate the administration for nominating a world-class development leader for this position." However, former World Bank economist and New York University professor William Easterly, worried about Kim's lack of experience in economics, said, "You have to have the mind-set to allocate scarce funds, rather than approaching the problem as if we have unlimited resources for suffering people. Frankly, I see some danger signs in this kind of pick."

Nigeria's Okonjo-Iweala said of her nomination that she was "absolutely [confident]. I have long experience in the World Bank, in government and in diplomacy and I look forward to giving you my vision at the appropriate time. I share the World Bank vision of fighting poverty with passion. The issue is in what direction one must take this to make this the most beneficial." Her bid was supported by South Africa's Finance Minister Pravin Gordhan who said that "she has eminent academic qualifications and would be, I think, a candidate of choice not only on the African continent but well beyond as well." She was formally nominated by South Africa, while the bid was supported by Angola which, with South Africa and Nigeria, lobbied other African states for support.

Though Brazil said that both Okonjo-Iweala and Ocampo would be "great" candidates, it had not decided whom to support but would decide who the best voice of the emerging market economies was likely to be. Some indications suggested it supported Ocampo. Russia concurred in calling for a bigger role for emerging market countries in global financial institutions, while India said it would consult with the BRICS states. Mexico said that it was open to any option.

An unofficial forum hosted by the Center for Global Development and The Washington Post was created and all three candidates were invited to give a speech and answer questions from Post editor Nancy Birdsall and the audience. Only Okonjo-Iweala and Ocampo responded and provided their views. Kim's failure to respond to the invitation was reported by William Easterly as being for "purely logistical reasons."

=== Nomination reactions ===
Rogerio Studart, the Brazilian member of the executive board, said that developing countries would like to see a broad discussion about the World Bank's future in choosing a president. Former executive board member Domenico Lombardi said that Ocampo's and Okonjo-Iweala's credentials were a signal of a "big shift" in that it is reflective of a "game change" making this the first "truly contested election."

A former IMF official at the Peterson Institute for International Economics, Arvind Subramanian, said Kim's nomination was "quite unusual" and doubted his credentials. He said of the process that "you will see more of a debate, an assessment of the merits of the different candidates and the direction of the bank. It is not a slam dunk. It is not an obvious choice."

Two associates of the Carnegie Endowment for International Peace, Uri Dadush and Moises Naim, criticised the way the leaders of both the World Bank and the IMF have been selected through "opaque, quota-driven negotiations," arguing that "no well-run global company selects its senior management this way." Their colleague, Yukon Huang, suggested that Kim's nomination conveyed the message from the United States that Kim was a "man of the world" and added that the decision was based not on domestic political considerations but on Kim's professional qualifications.

=== Meritocracy arguments ===
Gordhan added that the nominations in this election had resulted in progress. "We have come some way because it's no longer in the smoke-filled rooms of Europe and the US that the spoils are shared between the IMF and World Bank positions, between those two centres of power. This time the invitation was open to anybody to nominate a candidate. [But] the question is whether the process subsequent to that...has followed through on basic democratic tenets."

Ocampo withdrew his candidacy on 13 April, citing a lack of support from his native Colombia and arguing that the process was political as opposed to merit-based. Before the election, Okonjo-Iweala also criticised the US domination of the process since the World Bank's founding in 1944.

== Result ==
After Ocampo's withdrawal, and with support from Russia, Japan and many European countries, along with that of the United States, Canada and South Korea, Kim was announced as the winner on 16 April. China, India and Mexico were reportedly supportive of Kim's candidacy.

A statement from the World Bank's directors read that the board had "deep appreciation" for Kim and that all the candidates "enriched the discussion of the role of the president and of the World Bank Group's future direction. The final nominees received support from different member countries, which reflected the high caliber of the candidates." Kim, who was in Peru at the time, said that as president he would "seek a new alignment of the World Bank Group with a rapidly changing world. It was here in the shantytowns of Lima that I learned how injustice and indignity may conspire to destroy the lives and hopes of the poor. It was here that I saw how communities struggle to prosper because of a lack of infrastructure and basic services...And it was here that I learned that we can triumph over adversity by empowering the poor and focusing on results." Okonjo-Iweala's reaction to the result included criticising the "long-standing and unfair tradition. It is clear to me that we need to make it more open, transparent and merit-based. We need to make sure that we do not contribute to a democratic deficit in global governance."

=== Reactions ===
Obama congratulated Kim and said that he was "confident that Dr Kim will be an inclusive leader who will bring to the bank a passion for and deep knowledge of development, a commitment to sustained economic growth, and the ability to respond to complex challenges and seize new opportunities." Despite controversy he also said that he was satisfied with the "open" and "transparent" selection process. Secretary of State Hillary Clinton added that Kim "is an excellent selection to lead the World Bank forward, build consensus with donor and borrowing countries, and encourage the increasingly important leadership role of developing countries. We look forward to working with Dr Kim as he shapes an even stronger World Bank. Together, we will help develop economies, build partnerships, and alleviate poverty." Treasury Secretary Timothy Geithner said of Kim that he would offer a new perspective as "his deep development background coupled with his dedication to forging consensus will help breathe new life into the World Bank's efforts to secure fast economic growth that is widely shared." Richard Falk said the election signified a eurocentric prevalence and that the "geopolitical passivity of the BRICs is not encouraging." He further noted:

UN System is largely frozen in time, and the world is deprived of a more legitimate global problem-solving capability that is desperately needed at this time. It is important to move toward the achievement of global democracy for the sake of both global policymaking and the overall legitimacy of world order. To move away from violent geopolitics, acknowledging changes in the status of governments by reliance on soft power criteria leadership of international institutions has never been more useful. From this perspective the selection of Dr Kim, even if he lives up to his considerable potential for a turn toward global empathy, is one more lost opportunity.

NGO reactions included that of Kim's former Health Global Access Project which called him a "transformative figure in global health" and cited his campaigning for increasing access to AIDS treatment in Africa which occurred "at a time when so-called experts in development – including the World Bank – argued that it was neither feasible nor cost-effective." Oxfam's Elizabeth Stuart praised Kim but condemned the electoral process as a "sham": "Dr. Kim is an excellent choice for World Bank president and a true development hero. But we'll never know if he was the best candidate for the job, because there was no true and fair competition." Peter Chowla of the Bretton Woods Project said the election was "a stitch-up between the US and Europe. This will further erode the Bank's legitimacy unless Kim starts listening closely to developing countries and critics of the World Bank, and begins a process of fundamental reform."

The Financial Times described the election as a "bitter contest" which exposed the World Bank's "failure to practise what it preaches." It quoted the Secretary-General of the Common Market for Eastern and Southern Africa Sindiso Ngwenya criticising the fact that the World Bank's selection process had not changed to "reflect evolving global realities. The World Bank has lost its moral authority with respect to the processes of fair governance and transparency. The bank prides itself on open competitive bidding, but this [election] was not based on merit but on those with the muscle."
