= Jim Yong Kim =

American physician (born 1959)

Jim Yong Kim 김용
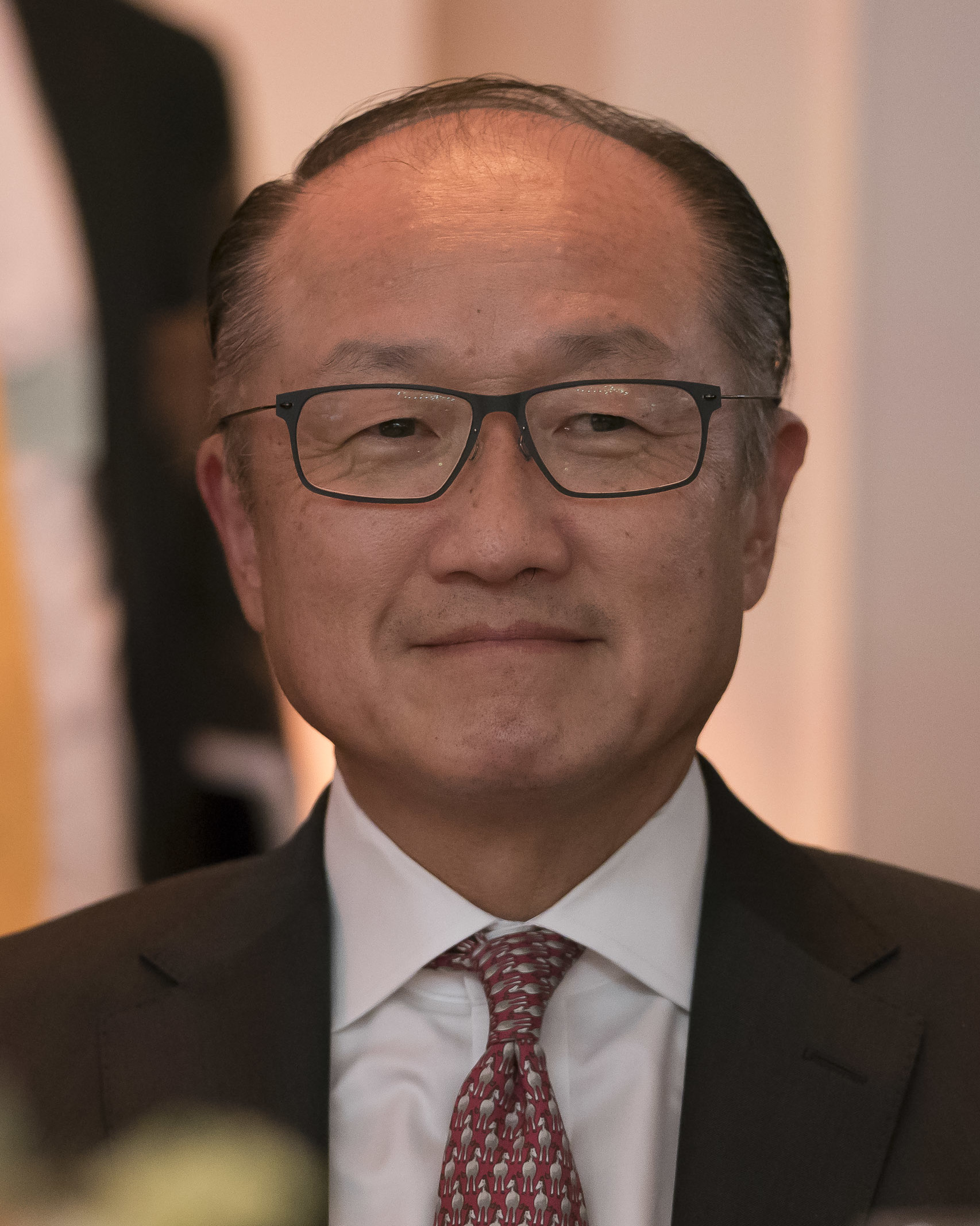
- Kim in 2018

12th President of the World Bank Group
- In office July 1, 2012 – February 1, 2019
- Chief Executive: Kristalina Georgieva
- Preceded by: Robert Zoellick
- Succeeded by: Kristalina Georgieva (Acting)

17th President of Dartmouth College
- In office July 1, 2009 – June 30, 2012
- Preceded by: James Wright
- Succeeded by: Philip J. Hanlon

Personal details
- Born: December 8, 1959 (age 66) Seoul, South Korea
- Party: Democratic
- Spouse: Younsook Lim
- Children: 2
- Education: University of Iowa (attended); Brown University (BS); Harvard University (MD, PhD)

- Jim Yong Kim
- Hangul: 김용
- Hanja: 金墉
- RR: Gim Yong
- MR: Kim Yong

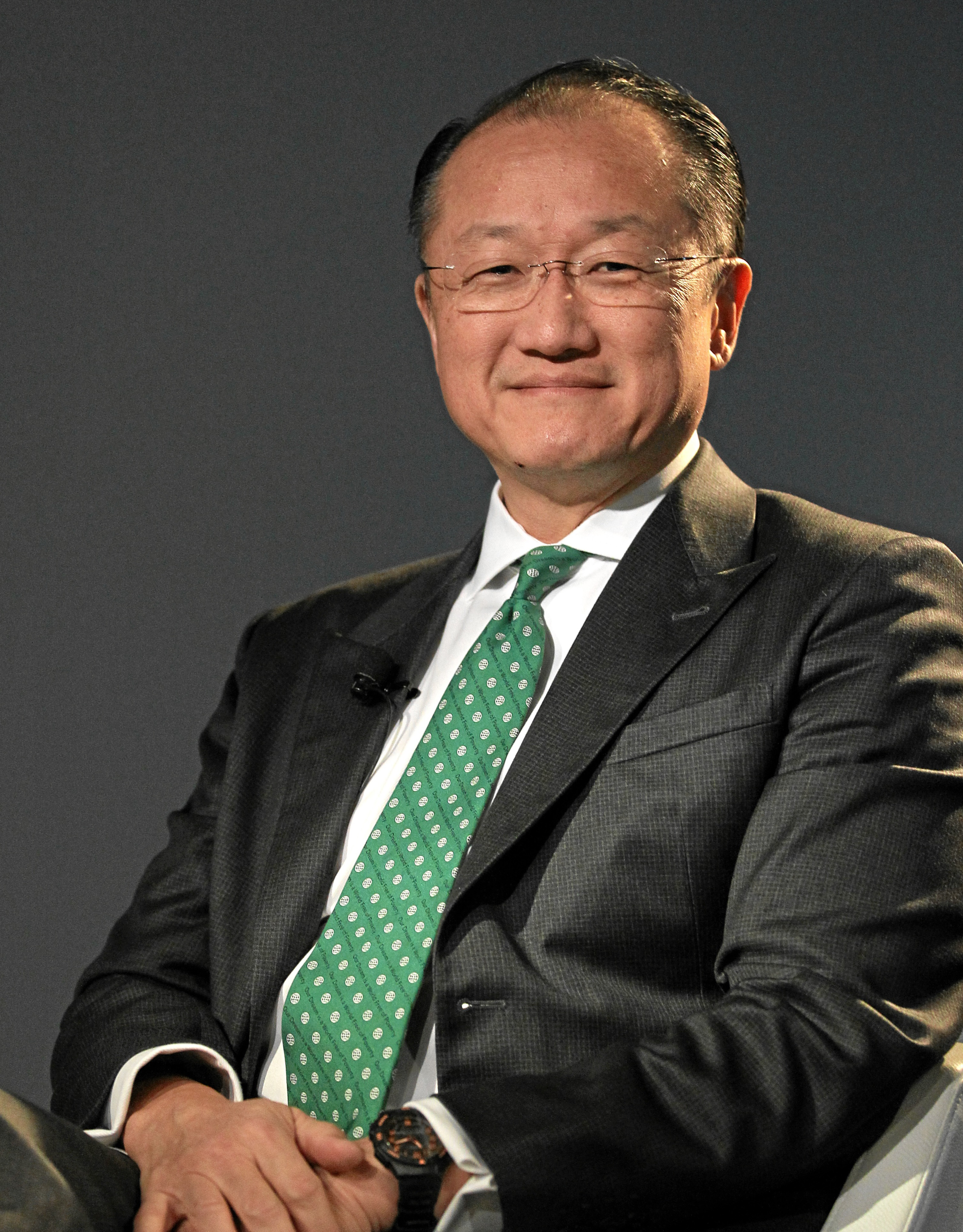
Kim during the WEF 2013

Jim Yong Kim (born December 8, 1959), also known as Kim Yong (Korean: 김용; Hanja: 金墉), is an American physician and anthropologist who was the president of the World Bank from 2012 to 2019.

Kim chaired the Department of Global Health and Social Medicine at Harvard Medical School and was co-founder and executive director of Partners In Health before becoming president of Dartmouth College from 2009 to 2012. He was the first Asian American president of an Ivy League institution.

Kim was named the world's 50th most powerful person by Forbes Magazine's List of The World's Most Powerful People in 2013.

== Early life ==
Born in Seoul, South Korea in 1959, Jim Yong Kim immigrated with his family to the U.S. at the age of five and grew up in Muscatine, Iowa. His father taught dentistry at the University of Iowa, while his mother received her PhD in philosophy. Kim attended Muscatine High School, where he was valedictorian, class president, and played both quarterback for the football team and point guard on the basketball team. After a year and a half at the University of Iowa, he transferred to Brown University, where he graduated magna cum laude with a Bachelor of Arts in human biology in 1982. He earned an M.D. from Harvard Medical School in 1991, and a PhD in anthropology at Harvard University in 1993.

== Career ==
=== Partners in Health (1987–2003) ===
Kim, Paul Farmer, Todd McCormack, Thomas J. White, and Ophelia Dahl co-founded Partners In Health (PIH) in 1987. The organization began with new, community-focused health care programs in Haiti, which provided treatments based on local needs and trained community members to implement them. By the early 1990s, the program in Haiti was serving more than 100,000 people. It achieved success treating infectious diseases at low cost, spending $150 to $200 to cure tuberculosis patients in their homes, treatment that would have cost $15,000 to $20,000 in a U.S. hospital. Kim was instrumental in designing treatment protocols and making deals for cheaper, more effective drugs.

In 1994, PIH expanded its model into Peru. By 1998, successful results curing both common and serious ailments prompted the World Health Organization to embrace the model and support the adaptation of community-based care for impoverished communities around the world. Particular success in treating multi-drug-resistant tuberculosis (MDR-TB) prompted international organizations to rededicate efforts to the eradication of the disease, and in June 2002, the World Health Organization adopted prescriptions for dealing with the disease that were virtually the same as PIH had used in Peru. Kim's work with PIH to treat MDR-TB was the first large-scale attempt to treat the disease in a poor country, and the efforts have been replicated in more than 40 countries around the world.

PIH employs more than 18,000 people in 11 countries. Kim left the organization as executive director in 2003.

Kim's work with Partners in Health is documented in the 2017 film Bending the Arc.

=== World Health Organization (2003–2006) ===
Kim left PIH in 2003 to join the World Health Organization (WHO) as an adviser to the director-general. In March 2004, he was appointed as director of WHO's HIV/AIDS department, after having success creating programs to fight the disease at PIH. Kim oversaw all of WHO's work related to HIV/AIDS, focusing on initiatives to help developing countries scale up their treatment, prevention, and care programs. This included an ambitious "3x5 initiative" designed to put three million people in developing countries on AIDS treatment by the end of 2005. The goal was not met until 2007, but according to the WHO, served to push the treatment strategy for AIDS in Africa further and faster than could have otherwise been hoped. As of 2012, the program has treated more than 7 million Africans with HIV.

=== Harvard University (1993–2009) ===
Beginning in 1993, Kim was a lecturer at Harvard Medical School, eventually holding professorships in medicine, social medicine and human rights. At the time of his departure in 2009, Kim was chair of the Department of Global Health and Social Medicine, chief of the Division of Global Health Equity at Brigham and Women's Hospital, and director of the François-Xavier Bagnoud Center for Health and Human Rights at the Harvard School of Public Health, known internally as "The Four Pillars" a term and concept taken from his earlier WHO work with HIV/AIDS (the 3x5 program).

During his time at Harvard, Kim published numerous articles for leading academic and scientific journals, including the New England Journal of Medicine, The Lancet, Science, and others; and contributed to several books. An expert on tuberculosis, Kim also chaired or was a member of a number of committees on international TB policy.

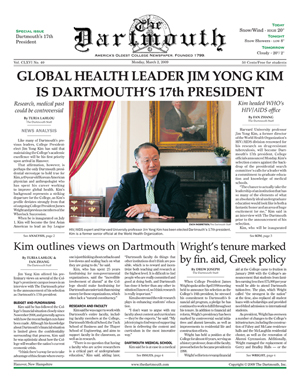
Cover of The Dartmouth, March 2, 2009, Global Health Leader Jim Yong Kim is Dartmouth's 17th President.

=== Dartmouth College (2009–2012) ===
In March 2009, Kim was named the 17th president of Dartmouth College, becoming the first Asian-American president of an Ivy League institution. He oversaw the development of several innovative programs at Dartmouth, utilizing his past experience in health care and international affairs.

In January 2010, Kim helped partner Dartmouth students and faculty with Partners In Health and other organizations to respond to the devastating earthquake in Haiti, forming the Dartmouth Haiti Response. The initiative resulted in over $1 million in donations, the delivery of 18 tons of medical supplies and 25 volunteer medical professionals to Haiti, as well as hundreds of student volunteers contributing on campus. In April 2010, Kim launched the National College Health Improvement Project (NCHIP), which convenes a number of expert institutions to develop quantitative methods to address student health issues. The project launched its inaugural program, an effort to address binge drinking, in April 2011. In May 2010, Kim helped secure a $35 million anonymous grant to establish the Dartmouth Center for Health Care Delivery Science. The Center creates a groundbreaking new field of graduate study, fostering international collaboration between researchers and medical practitioners to design, implement, and scale new models of high-quality low-cost care. In 2012, following considerable concern and an extended effort by Kim to address sexual violence on campus, Dartmouth adopted a new campus-wide initiative to educate students on the importance of bystander intervention in sexual assault cases as part of a larger Sexual Assault Awareness Program.

==== Controversies during tenure ====
In 2011, Kim was criticized for refusing to release the college's budget, prompting the passage of a resolution by faculty demanding more details. He answered this criticism by releasing a large supplementary report on the budget and holding a public meeting with faculty, who expressed satisfaction with the response. But he did not address a Student Assembly request for access to information about all budget items exceeding $10,000. In 2011, a handful of editorials appeared in Dartmouth's student newspaper expressing dissatisfaction with Kim's presidency, with one calling him "unpopular among many students these days." His leadership was also criticized in the wake of a hazing scandal, which resulted in charges against the fraternity and the creation of a task force to address hazing amid comments from some that Kim did not spend enough time on campus. After he announced that he would leave Dartmouth for the World Bank if elected, the student body president called Kim's presidency an "aberration" and a failure. Forbes also criticized Kim's presidency, calling it "disappointing" and a "cautionary tale" to other "me-first" leaders.

=== World Bank presidency (2012–2019) ===
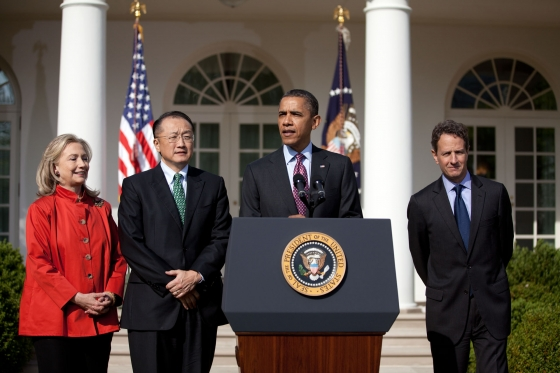
President Obama announces Dr. Jim Yong Kim as nominee to lead the World Bank.

On March 23, 2012, U.S. President Barack Obama announced his nomination of Kim for president of the World Bank. That same day Kim sent a letter addressed to the Dartmouth community stating that the position was "one of the most critical institutions fighting poverty and providing assistance to developing countries in the world today. After much reflection, I have accepted this nomination to national and global service" and that "if I am elected, our Board will take appropriate steps to ensure continuity of leadership and determine the timing of a search. For now, I remain president of Dartmouth."

On April 16, 2012, the World Bank officially elected Kim president. He was the first Bank leader whose professional background is not in the political or financial sectors, and the first to have previous experience personally tackling health issues in developing countries.

In a statement from Kim regarding his election as the president, he said that the World Bank would deliver more powerful results to support sustained growth, prioritize evidence-based solutions over ideology, and amplify the voices of developing countries. Upon assuming office, he said he was "honored to assume the Presidency of the World Bank Group. I do so at a moment that is pivotal for the global economy, and defining for the World Bank as an institution." Kim's presidency was controversial among World Bankers. He faced pushback in 2014 from the staff led by Senior Country Officer Fabrice Houdart after awarding a very unusual bonus, eventually deemed unethical to his CFO, Bertrand Badré, eventually rescinding it and apologizing publicly.

On September 27, 2016, Kim was reappointed as the World Bank president, for a five-year term beginning July 1, 2017. On January 7, 2019, Kim announced that he would step down as president, effective February 1, 2019. It was announced that he would be joining Global Infrastructure Partners after departing the World Bank presidency.

In 2021, an independent inquiry revealed that World Bank leaders, including Kim, pressured bank staff to alter data to inflate the rankings of China, Azerbaijan, Saudi Arabia and the United Arab Emirates.

== Personal life ==
Kim is married to Younsook Lim, a pediatrician, and they have two children. Kim is actively involved in a variety of sports, including basketball, volleyball, tennis, and golf. He speaks Korean, which he learned at age 24 when he moved to Korea for his dissertation, and Spanish.

== Board memberships and honors ==
Kim received a MacArthur Fellowship in 2003, was named one of America's 25 Best Leaders by U.S. News & World Report in 2005, and in 2006 was listed as one of the top 100 most influential people in the world by Time Magazine. He is on the advisory board of Incentives for Global Health, the NGO formed to develop the Health Impact Fund proposal. He is also a member of the Institute of Medicine of the United States National Academies. Kim was elected to the American Academy of Arts and Sciences in 2010.

== Publications ==
- Farmer Paul E, Kim JY. Community-based approaches to the control of multidrug-resistant tuberculosis: Introducing "DOTS-plus". British Medical Journal 1998; 317:671-4.
- Becerra MC, Bayona J, Freeman J, Farmer PE, Kim JY. Redefining MDR-TB transmission "hot spots." International Journal of Tuberculosis and Lung Disease 2000; 4(5):387-94.
- Farmer Paul, Leandre F, Mukherjee JS, Claude M, Nevil P, Smith-Fawzi MC, Koenig SP, Castro A, Becerra MC, Sachs J, Attaran A, Kim JY. Community-based approaches to HIV treatment in resource-poor settings. Lancet 2001; 358(9279):404-9.
- Farmer Paul, Leandre F, Mukherjee J, Gupta R, Tarter L, Kim JY. Community-based treatment of advanced HIV disease: Introducing DOT-HAART (Directly Observed therapy with highly active antiretroviral therapy). Bulletin of the World Health Organization 2001; 79(12):1145–51.
- Mitnick C, Bayona J, Palacios E, Shin S, Furin J, Alcántara F, Sánchez E, Sarria M, Becerra M, Fawzi MCS, Kapiga S, Neuberg D, Maguire JH, Kim JY, Farmer PE. Community-based therapy for multidrug-resistant tuberculosis in Lima, Peru. New England Journal of Medicine 2003; 348(2):119-28.
- Gupta Raj, Irwin A, Raviglione MC, Kim JY. Scaling up treatment for HIV/AIDS: Lessons learned from multidrug-resistant tuberculosis. Lancet 2004; 363(9405):320-4.
- Kim Jim Yong, Farmer P. AIDS in 2006 – Moving toward one world, one hope? New England Journal of Medicine 2006; 355:645-7.
- Kim Jim Yong. Unexpected political immunity to AIDS. Lancet 2006; 368(9534):441-2.
- Kim Jim Yong. A lifelong battle against disease. U.S. News & World Report 2007; 143(18):62-4.
- Kim Jim Yong. Toward a Golden Age- Reflections on Global Health and Social Justice. Harvard International Review 2007; 29 (2): 20–25.
- Kim Jim Yong, Farmer Paul. Surgery and Global Health: A View from Beyond the OR. World Journal of Surgery 2008; 32(4): 533–6.
- Kim Jim Yong, Millen JV, A Irwin, J Gershman (eds.). Dying for Growth: Global Inequality and the Health of the Poor. Monroe, ME: Common Courage Press, 2000.
- Jain Sachin H, Weintraub R, Rhatigan J, Porter ME, Kim JY. Delivering Global Health. Student British Medical Journal 2008; 16:27.
- Kim Jim Yong, Rhatigan J, Jain SH, Weintraub R, Porter ME. From a declaration of values to the creation of value in global health: a report from Harvard University's Global Health Delivery Project. Glob Public Health. 2010 Mar; 5(2):181-8.
