= Alfred Diamant =

Austrian-born American political scientist

Alfred Diamant (September 25, 1917 – May 11, 2012) was an Austrian-born American political scientist. His main contribution was in the field of comparative politics and comparative public administration. He was a member of the Comparative Administration Group (CAG) and a co-chairperson of the Council for European Studies based at Columbia University. According to Peter Alexis Gourevitch, Diamant was both "on the Executive Committee of the Council for European Studies (based in New York) and the Interuniversity Center for European Studies in Montreal". Diamant's areas of expertise were "Comparative Western European Politics and Social Policy". Together with his colleague, James Christoph, he "established Indiana University as a major site of the study of European culture, society and politics". John D. Martz called the works of Maurice Duvergier, Sigmund Neumann and Diamant that focus on the study of political parties "Western European-oriented classics". D.B. Robertson saw Diamant as "a gifted and humane scholar".

== Early life ==
Diamant was born in Vienna, Austria, and came to the United States as a young man when the fascists gained power in Germany and Austria. During WWII, he served in the U.S. army. He was married to Ann Diamant.

Diamant wrote his M.A. thesis on "Prototypes of Austro-German Fascism" at Indiana University in 1948. By that time, it was already clear to him that he wanted to teach and do research at a university.

== Democratic commitment ==
His focus on the anti-democratic developments in pre-WWII Europe is apparent in a number of large studies and minor contributions that he wrote since the 1950s. Diamant analyzed the role of Conservative political catholicism in Austria and its contribution to the rise of the clerical fascist Dollfuss regime. He also focused on the strengths and failures of the left in (above all) Austria and Germany that preceded their defeat by fascism. Such works were motivated by a desire to enlighten people concerning the root causes and to prevent a return of what had occurred, no matter whether it might reappear in the form of a tragedy or as a farce. He was convinced that the repeat of mistakes, the return of the same was not inevitable. Instead of pessimism (which would have been understandable), a democratic optimism prevailed.

At the same time, Diamant also took a stand back home in the U.S., with regard to U.S. affairs. Like other open-minded, nonconformist intellectuals, he was opposed to witchhunts of the type practiced by Senator Joseph McCarthy. As early as 1950, he took a stand when he reviewed the book "Character Assassination" by Jerome Davis that had just appeared. Another article published in the 1950s in The Western Political Quarterly also reflects his democratic commitment, arguing in favor of improved local government. Similarly, he defended the right of Vietnam War opponents to dissent in an article jointly written with two colleagues and published in the New York Times in 1965.

== Critical study of Max Weber's institutional frameworks ==
In the 1960s, Diamant focused increasingly on the critical study of institutional frameworks and thus, above all, on bureaucracy. Max Weber, the conservative he initially looked at without much sympathy, was now critically received and his writings were adapted to fit the needs of a democratic societal project. (In similar fashion, progressives have been open to the reception of Clausewitz since the 1960s.) An essay by Diamant titled The Bureaucratic Model: Max Weber Rejected, Rediscovered, Reformed, reveals this critical yet decisive reception of Weber. The author of "The American Bureaucracy", Richard J. Stillman, calls it an "insightful piece". Dwight Waldo thinks it is important to direct the reader's attention to it. As Waldo notes, it is in this essay that Diamant "reviews the vast array" of scholarly publications on bureaucracy respectively bureaucracies while at the same time "carefully and penetratingly examin[ing] what Weber wrote on, and relating to, bureaucracy". Diamant "evaluates, relates, and classifies; and ends up by setting forth proposals 'for the comparative analysis of bureaucracies; using the Weberian ideal-type'" – as he had modified it.

Diamant emphasized that Weber "associated bureaucracy with a legal-rational authority system". This was what made it modern and what constituted its essence. Ideally, a bureaucratic (or administrative) apparatus (or institution) had to be rational in order to function well. It also was tied to the rule of law (as opposed to absolutist or dictatorial arbitrary suspension of such rule of law). Ideally, this made its functioning dependable and foreseeable. Both qualities, rationality and rule of law, made bureaucracy a modern phenomenon. And its authority – the fact that it was accepted by the population – depended on both traits. There was nothing specifically Prussian about either rationality or rule of law. If the specific Prussian way of applying rationality and rule of law was deficient (or if, somewhat later, the bureaucratic rationality of the fascists who organized the holocaust was horrible, just like the Nuremberg laws (Nuernberger Gesetze) were horrible), this did not mean that the ideals had to be discarded as meaningful guideposts. Instead, they had to be filled, again and again, in given historical situations, with a material content that reflected both humane values and the concrete needs of the citizens.

Diamant was not necessarily a Weberian scholar. Referring to Weber's ideal-type of bureaucracy, E. N. Suleiman observes, "Some saw in his model a rigid, Prussian-inspired influence that had but a tangential relationship to reality". Suleiman points specifically to Diamant, who did view Weber as a functional academic, whose writings on the workings of bureaucracies served the interests of the Wilhelminian authoritarian nation-state. Insofar Weber's model was "a Prussian inspired model" just like Weber himself was a nationalist and per se anti-democratic. He represented and aided the status quo.

But regardless of one's social and political position regarding this status quo, how could one ignore his penetrating insights in the way bureaucracies function and regarding the (positive and negative) purposes they can serve? What mattered was to reflect his insights in the light of new, added knowledge and in the interest not of a Leviathan of the Prusso-German type, but in the interest of a democratically constituted society. As far as the charge is concerned that Weber's ideal-type was abstract and thus meaningless, Diamant knew full-well that science operates with abstractions. This certainly could not be held against the German scholar. Therefore, it is not surprising that "Diamant makes a valiant effort to defend and 'resurrect' Weber from the telling criticisms of scholars like Presthus, Beck and Berger. Weber, he notes, was not so naive as to believe that his ideal-constructs had unqualified correspondence" in what we like to refer to as the real world. What mattered, according to Diamant, was to modify, adapt, or surpass Weber's constructs. It is well known that in the 20th century, several sociologists and political scientists "have sought to construct typologies that are closer approximations of the mixes or dualities existing in the real world. The [CAG] was prominent in this field".

As a member of this group, Diamant shared its basic orientation but did not see the need to discard Weber's bureaucracy model entirely. There was too much in it that was still pertinent.

== Comparative studies of bureaucratic systems ==
Robert H. Jackson states that "since World War II a new approach to the study of public administration ... developed". Comparative strategies of research were developed and this meant that "administrative behavior and practices [were] analyzed in widely different societies and cultures". Diamant, a key member of the CAG, was part of this innovation of the discipline. "Among scholars who have contribute to the comparative studies of bureaucratic systems ... Monroe Berger, Alfred Diamant, Ferrel Heady, Robert Presthus and Michael Crozier" are singled out as particularly noteworthy by Pardeep Sahni and Etakula Vayunandan. Diamant's grasp of European political cultures and his knowledge of American paradigms made a comparative orientation plausible. Waldo called his discussion of "The Relevance of Comparative Politics to the Study of Comparative Administration" an excellent methodological contribution. Empirical comparative studies are a thorough approach if one wants to understand the specific traits of fascist or Stalinist bureaucracy. They could also serve to elucidate the positive and negative traits of French public administration, as a state bureaucracy subjected to dual political control. How did it work, in comparison to U.S. public administration? The focus on France mattered, for another reason, as well. France was practically a sister republic of the U.S., with a long republican and progressive tradition. It was another "common law country". In his critique of Austrian conservatism, Diamant had "defined … European political Catholicism as a reaction of both clerics and laymen to the challenges of the French Revolution respectively the modern (liberal) state of the 19th century that was based on it. This 'anti-modernist' attitude manifests itself on different levels – on the level of ideas, by way of the formation of a distinct 'Catholic philosophy' and 'culture', on the socio-economic level by way of the development of a 'Catholic social doctrine', on the political level by way of the organization of Catholic movements and parties". This is how G. Stimmer sums it up. France was in many ways an antipode of Austria. It was more modern, having been at the forefront of the industrial revolution, on the European continent, together with Belgium. Although Catholic, it was anti-clerical. Conservative forces were not almost constantly overwhelming Republicans. On top of it, it had a long administrative tradition anchored in Republicanism, though older roots of its droit administratif ('legal framework pertaining to public administration'), in the Royal Council of the Ancien Régime, existed. Diamant was especially interested in French developments that took place in the course of the first term of President Mitterrand.

It is noteworthy, however, that Diamant did not idealize the situation in France. It is true that it was more liberal than Austria had been. It had a strong administrative tradition, and the French republic regulated the civil service by way of a body of laws pertaining to the country's administration. If we would suppose, however, that in France, administrators can provide some "impetus for major reform". We are mistaken, as Aberbach et al. have not failed to point out. They quote Diamant, "The French experience would indicate that, in fact, during periods of political indecision, the grand corps do not really govern the country, they simply continue routine operations, maintain the status quo, and protect their own interest". Diamant regrets that these administrators "could not carry through radical innovations". Civil servants of the people should act efficiently and determinedly, in the interest of the people.

== Studies of developing nations ==
As far as administrative science research was focused on developing countries, it became increasingly comparative in orientation, as H. G. Steiffert noted. Steiffert mentions Diamant as one of the noteworthy theoretical contributors to the debate in the 1960s.

In the 1960s, it was above all the CAG that was focused on Development Studies, especially after it had received a substantial grant from the Ford Foundation in 1962 that was to facilitate research on "methods for improving public administration in developing countries". Among the noteworthy members of the CAG, Fred Riggs stands out. He had joined the faculty of the Government Department at Indiana University in 1956. In 1960, he was elected chair of the CAG, a position he held until 1971.

This was the period when "the CAG became a forum for intellectuals attempting to understand in a systematic [way] why administrative practices in non-Western countries diverged so widely from what were thought to be good and universal principles".

As a member of the Comparative Administration Group, based at Indiana University like Riggs, Diamant applied himself to Third World Studies. He chose a bureaucratic systems approach which Rodman describes as "less abstract and more obviously relevant" to its chosen purpose than the "input-output system approach" was as a "conceptual framework". Several publications of Diamant that tackled methodological questions appeared in the 1960s. Schrader called Diamant's Models of Bureaucracy and Development "an important, relevant work".

At least one of Diamant's studies focused on racism in South Africa at the time. The apartheid regime was confronted by a liberation movement (Nelson Mandela's African National Congress) that was branded as terrorist by various governments. Change was necessary. Racism was unacceptable to Diamant who had suffered fascist racism. The study was supported by a subdivision of the European Commission.

== Administrative democratic institutions ==
Sahni and Vayunandan stated, "The rise of the modern welfare state has expanded the scope of public administration. It has widened to the extent that now very few aspects of an individual's life remain unaffected by public administration. This stands true for all societies, socialist, capitalist, and so on". They also quote W.B.Donham who said, "If our civilization fails, it will be mainly because of a breakdown of administration". The recognition of the objective necessity of administrating public matters (in Latin: res publica) does not imply indifference to what form that administration should take. Important matters include: what form of administration best serves democracy, how the people can affect the system to make it serve their needs, and how the people can ensure that administration is resilient.

Diamant was convinced that if bureaucracies were unavoidable, at least they should not work against us or limit civil rights and the freedom of citizens unnecessarily; on the contrary, they should better our lot. And above all, they should be democratically controlled. How they could be controlled in the best way by the people and its elected servants was a problem that could be handled in a more rational way if empirical evidence of the pros and cons of actually employed models of political oversight was scrutinized in a comparative manner. Apparently, speaking of public institutions, efficiency, coordination, responsibility, oversight and (democratic) political control matter in democratic contexts.

== Industrial democracy ==
Diamant also turned to the question of industrial democracy. His study revealed a critical impetus. The analytic stance and the detachment may have made his critical observations even more effective. Discussing the German model which allowed trade-union representatives to sit on the board of corporations in the name of joint decision-making or co-determination ('Mitbestimmung'), P. Bachrach and A. Botwinick observed that Diamant provided a "thorough and perceptive study". Diamant "concluded that the achievements of co-determination so far are more nearly system-maintaining than system-transforming in character".

== Diamant's theoretical emphasis on political development ==
Diamant hoped for improvements on political systems which existed. In his view, change that corresponded to the felt needs of the population was inherently positive. This progressive bend of mind was basically inscribed in his theory of political development. Omar Guerrero sums up Diamant's position by pointing out the specific quality that characterizes a process that the latter would describe as political development: political development is above all "creating conditions, within an institutional framework, that are suitable to the solution of a wide field of social problems". Guerrero further describes Diamant's position in this way: "A political system is engaged in a process of development if it can increase its capacity to attain successfully and continually new social goals and the creation of new types of organization. Such political development that leads to new institutional frameworks which allow the population to address social grievances in a new way is currently characteristic of a number of societies in South America. Keith R. Legg termed Diamant's approach that "view[ed] political development … as 'a generic process of successfully sustaining new demands, goals and organizations in a flexible manner'" as being "most useful".

== Tradition and innovation ==
Diamant's view that political institutions, despite their relative inertia, are not static but caught between the force of their traditions and pressures for innovation, and that for this very reason they reveal both their quality as historical result Resultatcharakter (historical result) and as a Prozesscharakter (historical process) is perhaps the most significant feature of his critical approach that modified Weber's comprehension of bureaucracies in contemporary society. This premise is at the root of his arguments in favor of improvement, innovation and development.

== Later life ==
Diamant was described by a colleague as having "a belief that our country and our world can be more just and more decent" than they actually are. In this respect, he was very much like Ann Diamant, a feminist who strongly believed in social justice.

Diamant died in Bloomington, aged 94.

== Major scholarly publications (A selection) ==
=== Book publications ===
- Diamant, Alfred. Austrian Catholics and the First Republic. Democracy, Capitalism and the Social Order, 1918–1934. Princeton, N.J. (Princeton University Press) 1960
- Diamant, Alfred. L'cattolici austriaci e la prima Repubblica, 1918–1934. Transl. by D. Fogu and A. Pozzan. Roma (Edizioni 5 Lune) 1964
- Diamant, Alfred. Die österreichischen Katholiken und die Erste Republik. Vienna [Austria] (Verlag der Wiener Volksbuchhandlung) 1960
- Diamant, Alfred. Political Development: Approaches to Theory and Strategy. Washington, D.C.; Bloomington, Ind. (American Society for Public Administration / International Development Research Center, Indiana University) 1963
- Diamant, Alfred. Bureaucracy in Developmental Movement Regimes: A Bureaucratic Model for Developing Societies. Bloomington, Ind. (CAG; American Society for Public Administration / International Development Research Center, Indiana University) 1964
- Diamant, Alfred. Race Attitudes in South Africa. Historical, Experimental and Psychological Studies. Brussels (Commission of the European Communities) 1965
- Diamant, Alfred. The Temporal Dimension in Models of Administration and Organization. Bloomington, Ind. (American Society for Public Administration) 1966
- Diamant, Alfred. European Models of Bureaucracy and Development (Comparative Administration Group; Occasional papers.) Bloomington, Ind. (Haverford College) 1966
- Diamant, Alfred, Modellbetrachtung der Entwicklungsverwaltung. (Transl by Hans Jecht). Baden-Baden (Nomos Verlagsgesellschaft) 1967 (= Politik und Verwaltung, 4)
- Diamant, Alfred. Democracy in Western Europe, n.p.(American Political Science Association) 1982, microfiche

=== Scholarly articles published in books and journals (a selection) ===
- Diamant, Alfred. "The French Administrative System," in: William J. Siffin, ed., Toward The Comparative Study of Public Administrations. Bloomington (Indiana University, Dept. of Government) 1957
- Diamant, Alfred. "A Case Study of Administrative Autonomy: Controls and Tensions in French Administration", in: Political Studies, vol. 6, no.2, June 1958, pp. 147–166
- Diamant, Alfred. The Bureaucratic Model: Max Weber Rejected, Rediscovered, Reformed, in: Ferrel Heady, Sybil L. Stokes (eds.), Papers in Comparative Public Administration. Ann Arbor, Mich. (Institute of Public Administration) 1962 [Also in: Papers in Comparative Public Administrative Sciences (American Political Science Association), No. 1, 1962, pp. 59–96]
- Diamant, Alfred, "The Temporal Dimension in Models of Administration and Organization," CAG Occasional Papers, Bloomington, Indiana (April 1966)
- Diamant, Alfred, "The Nature of Political Development," in: Jason L. Finkle and Richard W. Gable (eds.), Political Development and Social Change. New York (Wiley ) 1966 (2nd ed. 1971)
- Diamant, Alfred, "Political Development: Approaches to Theory and Strategy", in: John D. Montgomery and William J. Siffin, Approaches to Development: Politics, Administration and Change, New York (McGraw-Hill) 1966, pp. 15–48
- Diamant, Alfred, "Innovation in Bureaucratic Institutions", in: Public Administration Review, Vol. XXVII, No. 1, March 1967, pp. 77–87
- Diamant, Alfred. "Tradition and Innovation in French Administration", in: Comparative Political Studies, 1 (1968), pp. 251–274
- Alfred Diamant, "Bureaucracy in Development Movement Regimes", in: Fred W. Riggs (ed.), Frontiers of Development Administration. Durham, NC (Duke U.Press) 1970
- Diamant, Alfred. "European Bureaucratic Elites: Rising or Declining?" in: History of European Ideas, vol. 11 no.1, Jan. 1989, pp. 545–558
- Diamant, Alfred. "First Principles Preparatory to Constitutional Code", in: History of European Ideas, vol.12, no. 5, Jan. 1990, pp. 694–695
- Diamant, Alfred. "Comparative Politics: The Myth of the Eternal Return", in: PS: Political Science and Politics, vol. 23, no. 4, Dec. 1990, pp. 598–600
- Diamant, Alfred. "From 'Holocaust' to 'Rational Choice': Generational Change in Political Science", in: Perspectives on Political Science, vol.24, no.3, June 1995, pp. 147–150

=== Book Reviews (a selection) ===
- Alfred Diamant. "Bureaucracy and Public Policy in Neocorporatist Settings - Some European Lessons: […]", in: Comparative Politics, vol. 14, no. 1, Oct. 1981, pp. 101–124
- Alfred Diamant. "[Review of] Small States in World Markets: Industrial Policy in Europe [by Peter J. Katzenstein, Ithaca (Cornell University Press) 1993]", in: The American Political Science Review, vol. 80, no. 3 September 1986, pp. 1049–1050
- Alfred Diamant. "[Review of] Parteien in der Krise? In- und auslaendische Perspektiven [ed. by Peter Haungs; Eckhard Jesse (collab.). Cologne (Verlag Wissenschaft und Politik) 1987]", in: German Studies Review, vol. 11, no. 3, Oct.1988, pp. 538–539
- Alfred Diamant. "[Review of] Krisenzonen einer Demokratie: Gewalt, Streik und Konfliktunterdrueckung in Österreich seit 1918 [by Gerhard Botz. Frankfurt (Campus-Verlag) 1987]", in: German Studies Review, vol. 12, no. 2, May 1989, pp. 393–394
- Alfred Diamant. "[Review of] Coca Colonization und Kalter Krieg: Die Kulturmission der USA in Öesterreich nach dem Zweiten Weltkrieg [by Reinhold Wagnleitner, Vienna (Verlag fuer Gesellschaftskritik) 1991]", in: The American Historical Review, vol. 97, no. 3, June 1992, pp. 959–960
- Alfred Diamant. "[Review of] Red Vienna: Experiment in Working Class Culture 1919-1934 [by Helmut Gruber. New York (Oxford University Press) 1991]", in: The American Historical Review, vol. 98, no. 1, Feb.1993, pp. 201–202
- Alfred Diamant. "There is Nobody Here But Us Marginals: Mattei Dogan and Robert Pahre, Creative Marginality: Innovation at the Intersection of the Social Sciences", in: Journal of Policy History, vol. 5, no.2, April 1993, pp. 285–290 [review of: Mattei Dogan and Robert Pahre. Creative Marginality: Innovation at the Intersection of the Social Sciences (Boulder, Colo.: Westview Press, 1990]
