= Domenico Lombardi =

Banking executive

Domenico Lombardi is a former director of the Global Economy program at the Centre for International Governance Innovation (CIGI), a non-partisan global governance think tank in Waterloo, Ontario, Canada. He is also chair of the Oxford Institute for Economic Policy. Until 2013 he was a senior fellow at the Brookings Institution.

Dr. Lombardi is a former executive board member of the World Bank Group (2005–2007) and of the International Monetary Fund (IMF) (2001–2005). Prior to that, he was an economist in the Bank of Italy’s Research Department (1996 to 1999).

Dr. Lombardi serves as a board director for New Rules for Global Finance and sits on the advisory boards of the Bretton Woods Committee, the G20 Research Group, the G8 Research Group, and the Istituto Affari Internazionali.

His research focuses on international monetary relations, the global economy, and G-20 and G-8 summits. His articles have been published in academic journals including the Review of International Political Economy, the Review of International Organizations, the World Economics Journal and IMF Staff Papers.

In 2009, he co-edited the volume Finance, Development, and the IMF for Oxford University Press.

Recently, he authored a Report on IMF reform for the IMF's managing director, which he presented before the IMF's executive directors.

Lombardi studied banking and finance (Laurea) at Bocconi University and economics (Ph.D.) at Nuffield College, University of Oxford.
