= List of foreign ministers in 2012 =

This is a list of foreign ministers in 2012.

== Africa ==
- Algeria - Mourad Medelci (2007–2013)
- Angola - Georges Rebelo Chicoti (2010–2017)
- Benin - Nassirou Bako Arifari (2011–2015)
- Botswana - Phandu Skelemani (2008–2014)
- Burkina Faso - Djibril Bassolé (2011–2014)
- Burundi - Laurent Kavakure (2011–2015)
- Cameroon - Pierre Moukoko Mbonjo (2011–2015)
- Cape Verde - Jorge Borges (2011–2014)
- Central African Republic - Antoine Gambi (2009–2013)
- Chad - Moussa Faki (2008–2017)
- Comoros - Mohamed Bakri Ben Abdoulfatah Charif (2011–2013)
- Republic of Congo - Basile Ikouébé (2007–2015)
- Democratic Republic of Congo -
  1. Alexis Thambwe Mwamba (2008–2012)
  2. Raymond Tshibanda (2012–2016)
- Côte d'Ivoire
  1. Daniel Kablan Duncan (2011–2012)
  2. Charles Koffi Diby (2012–2016)
- Djibouti - Mahamoud Ali Youssouf (2005–present)
- Egypt - Mohamed Kamel Amr (2011–2013)
- Equatorial Guinea -
  1. Pastor Micha Ondó Bile (2003–2012)
  2. Agapito Mba Mokuy (2012–2018)
- Eritrea - Osman Saleh Mohammed (2007–present)
- Ethiopia -
  1. Hailemariam Desalegn (2010–2012)
  2. Berhane Gebre-Christos (acting) (2012)
  3. Tedros Adhanom (2012–2016)
- Gabon -
  1. Paul Toungui (2008–2012)
  2. Emmanuel Issoze-Ngondet (2012–2016)
- The Gambia -
  1. Mamadou Tangara (2010–2012)
  2. Mambury Njie (2012)
  3. Mamadou Tangara (2012)
  4. Susan Waffa-Ogoo (2012–2013)
- Ghana - Muhammad Mumuni (2009–2013)
- Guinea
  1. Edouard Niankoye Lamah (2010–2012)
  2. François Lonseny Fall (2012–2016)
- Guinea-Bissau -
  1. Mamadu Saliu Djaló Pires (2011–2012)
  2. Faustino Imbali (2012–2013)
- Kenya -
  1. Moses Wetangula (2008–2012)
  2. Sam Ongeri (2012–2013)
- Lesotho - Mohlabi Tsekoa (2007–2015)
- Liberia -
  1. Toga McIntosh (2010–2012)
  2. Augustine Kpehe Ngafuan (2012–2015)
- Libya
  1. Ashour Bin Khayal (2011–2012)
  2. Mohammed Abdelaziz (interim) (2012–2014)
- Madagascar - Pierrot Rajaonarivelo (2011–2013)
- Malawi -
  1. Peter Mutharika (2011–2012)
  2. Ephraim Chiume (2012–2014)
- Mali -
  1. Soumeylou Boubèye Maïga (2011–2012)
  2. Sadio Lamine Sow (2012)
  3. Tieman Coulibaly (2012–2013)
  - Azawad -
    1. Hama Ag Sid'Ahmed (2012)
    2. Hama Ag Mahmoud (2012-2013)
- Mauritania - Hamadi Ould Baba Ould Hamadi (2011–2013)
- Mauritius - Arvin Boolell (2008–2014)
- Morocco -
  1. Taieb Fassi Fihri (2007–2012)
  2. Saadeddine Othmani (2012–2013)
  - Western Sahara - Mohamed Salem Ould Salek (1998–2023)
- Mozambique - Oldemiro Balói (2008–2017)
- Namibia -
  1. Utoni Nujoma (2010–2012)
  2. Netumbo Nandi-Ndaitwah (2012–present)
- Niger - Mohamed Bazoum (2011–2015)
- Nigeria - Olugbenga Ashiru (2011–2013)
- Rwanda - Louise Mushikiwabo (2009–2018)
- São Tomé and Príncipe -
  1. Manuel Salvador dos Ramos (2010–2012)
  2. Natália Pedro da Costa Umbelina Neto (2012–2014)
- Senegal -
  1. Madické Niang (2009–2012)
  2. Alioune Badara Cissé (2012)
  3. Mankeur Ndiaye (2012–2017)
- Seychelles - Jean-Paul Adam (2010–2015)
- Sierra Leone -
  1. J. B. Dauda (2010–2012)
  2. Samura Kamara (2012–2017)
- Somalia -
  1. Mohamed Abdullahi Omaar (2010-2012)
  2. Abdullahi Haji Hassan Mohamed Nuur (2012)
  3. Fowsiyo Yussuf Haji Aadan (2012–2014)
  - Somaliland - Mohammad Abdullahi Omar (2010–2013)
  - Puntland - Daud Mohamed Omar (2010–2014)
- South Africa - Maite Nkoana-Mashabane (2009–2018)
- South Sudan - Nhial Deng Nhial (2011–2013)
- Sudan - Ali Karti (2010–2015)
- Swaziland - Mtiti Fakudze (2011–2013)
- Tanzania – Bernard Membe (2007–2015)
- Togo - Elliott Ohin (2010–2013)
- Tunisia - Rafik Abdessalem (2011–2013)
- Uganda -
  - Sam Kutesa (2005–2021)
  - Henry Oryem Okello (acting) (2011–2012)
- Zambia -
  1. Chishimba Kambwili (2011–2012)
  2. Given Lubinda (2012–2013)
- Zimbabwe - Simbarashe Mumbengegwi (2005–2017)

== Asia ==
- Afghanistan - Zalmai Rassoul (2010–2013)
- Armenia - Eduard Nalbandyan (2008–2018)
- Azerbaijan - Elmar Mammadyarov (2004–2020)
  - Nagorno-Karabakh -
    1. Vasily Atajanyan (acting) (2011–2012)
    2. Karen Mirzoyan (2012–2017)
- Bahrain - Sheikh Khalid ibn Ahmad Al Khalifah (2005–2020)
- Bangladesh – Dipu Moni (2009–2013)
- Bhutan - Ugyen Tshering (2008–2013)
- Brunei - Pengiran Muda Mohamed Bolkiah (1984–2015)
- Cambodia - Hor Namhong (1998–2016)
- China - Yang Jiechi (2007–2013)
- East Timor -
  1. Zacarias da Costa (2007–2012)
  2. José Luís Guterres (2012–2015)
- Georgia
  1. Grigol Vashadze (2008–2012)
  2. Maia Panjikidze (2012–2014)
  - Abkhazia - Viacheslav Chirikba (2011–2016)
  - South Ossetia
    1. Murat Dzhioyev (1998–2012)
    2. David Sanakoyev (2012–2015)
- India
  1. S. M. Krishna (2009–2012)
  2. Salman Khurshid (2012–2014)
- Indonesia - Marty Natalegawa (2009–2014)
- Iran - Ali Akbar Salehi (2010–2013)
- Iraq - Hoshyar Zebari (2003–2014)
  - Kurdistan - Falah Mustafa Bakir (2006–2019)
- Israel -
  1. Avigdor Lieberman (2009–2012)
  2. Benjamin Netanyahu (2012–2013)
  - Palestinian Authority - Riyad al-Maliki (2007–present)
    - Gaza Strip (in rebellion against the Palestinian National Authority)
      1. Muhammad Awad (2011–2012)
      2. Ismail Haniyeh (acting) (2012–2014)
- Japan -
  1. Kōichirō Gemba (2011–2012)
  2. Fumio Kishida (2012–2017)
- Jordan - Nasser Judeh (2009–2017)
- Kazakhstan –
  1. Yerzhan Kazykhanov (2011–2012)
  2. Erlan Idrissov (2012–2016)
- North Korea - Pak Ui-chun (2007–2014)
- South Korea - Kim Sung-hwan (2010–2013)
- Kuwait - Sheikh Sabah Al-Khalid Al-Sabah (2011–2019)
- Kyrgyzstan -
  1. Ruslan Kazakbayev (2010–2012)
  2. Erlan Abdyldayev (2012–2018)
- Laos - Thongloun Sisoulith (2006–2016)
- Lebanon - Adnan Mansour (2011–2014)
- Malaysia - Anifah Aman (2009–2018)
- Maldives -
  1. Ahmed Naseem (2011–2012)
  2. Abdul Samad Abdulla (2012–2013)
- Mongolia -
  1. Gombojavyn Zandanshatar (2009–2012)
  2. Luvsanvandan Bold (2012–2014)
- Myanmar - Wunna Maung Lwin (2011–2016)
- Nepal - Narayan Kaji Shrestha (2011–2013)
- Oman - Yusuf bin Alawi bin Abdullah (1982–2020)
- Pakistan - Hina Rabbani Khar (2011–2013)
- Philippines - Albert del Rosario (2011–2016)
- Qatar - Sheikh Hamad bin Jassim bin Jaber Al Thani (1992–2013)
- Saudi Arabia - Prince Saud bin Faisal bin Abdulaziz Al Saud (1975–2015
- Singapore - K. Shanmugam (2011–2015)
- Sri Lanka - G. L. Peiris (2010–2015)
- Syria - Walid Muallem (2006–2020)
- Taiwan -
  1. Timothy Yang (2009–2012)
  2. David Lin (2012–2016)
- Tajikistan - Khamrokhon Zaripov (2006–2013)
- Thailand - Surapong Tovichakchaikul (2011–2014)
- Turkey - Ahmet Davutoğlu (2009–2014)
- Turkmenistan - Raşit Meredow (2001–present)
- United Arab Emirates - Sheikh Abdullah bin Zayed Al Nahyan (2006–present)
- Uzbekistan -
  1. Elyor Ganiyev (2010–2012)
  2. Abdulaziz Komilov (2012–present)
- Vietnam - Phạm Bình Minh (2011–2021)
- Yemen - Abu Bakr al-Qirbi (2001–2014)

== Europe ==
- Albania -
  1. Edmond Haxhinasto (2010–2012)
  2. Edmond Panariti (2012–2013)
- Andorra - Gilbert Saboya Sunyé (2011–2017)
- Austria - Michael Spindelegger (2008–2013)
- Belarus
  1. Sergei Martynov (2003–2012)
  2. Vladimir Makei (2012–present)
- Belgium - Didier Reynders (2011–2019)
  - Brussels-Capital Region - Jean-Luc Vanraes (2009–2013)
  - Flanders - Kris Peeters (2008–2014)
  - Wallonia - Rudy Demotte (2009-2014)
- Bosnia and Herzegovina -
  1. Sven Alkalaj (2007–2012)
  2. Zlatko Lagumdžija (2012–2015)
- Bulgaria - Nickolay Mladenov (2010–2013)
- Croatia - Vesna Pusić (2011–2016)
- Cyprus - Erato Kozakou-Marcoullis (2011–2013)
  - Northern Cyprus - Hüseyin Özgürgün (2009–2013)
- Czech Republic - Karel Schwarzenberg (2010–2013)
- Denmark - Villy Søvndal (2011–2013)
  - Greenland - Kuupik Kleist (2009–2013)
  - Faroe Islands - Kaj Leo Johannesen (2011–2015)
- Estonia - Urmas Paet (2005–2014)
- Finland - Erkki Tuomioja (2011–2015)
- France -
  1. Alain Juppé (2011–2012)
  2. Laurent Fabius (2012–2016)
- Germany - Guido Westerwelle (2009–2013)
- Greece -
  1. Stavros Dimas (2011–2012)
  2. Petros Molyviatis (2012)
  3. Dimitris Avramopoulos (2012–2013)
- Hungary - János Martonyi (2010–2014)
- Iceland - Össur Skarphéðinsson (2009–2013)
- Ireland - Eamon Gilmore (2011–2014)
- Italy - Giulio Terzi di Sant'Agata (2011–2013)
- Latvia - Edgars Rinkēvičs (2011–2023)
- Liechtenstein - Aurelia Frick (2009–2019)
- Lithuania -
  1. Audronius Ažubalis (2010–2012)
  2. Linas Antanas Linkevičius (2012–2020)
- Luxembourg - Jean Asselborn (2004–present)
- Republic of Macedonia - Nikola Poposki (2011–2017)
- Malta
  1. Tonio Borg (2008–2012)
  2. Francis Zammit Dimech (2012–2013)
- Moldova - Iurie Leancă (2009–2013)
  - Transnistria -
    1. Vladimir Yastrebchak (2008–2012)
    2. Nina Shtanski (2012–2015)
- Monaco - José Badia (2011–2015)
- Montenegro -
  1. Milan Roćen (2006–2012)
  2. Nebojša Kaluđerović (2012)
  3. Igor Lukšić (2012–2016)
- Netherlands -
  1. Uri Rosenthal (2010–2012)
  2. Frans Timmermans (2012–2014)
- Norway -
  1. Jonas Gahr Støre (2005–2012)
  2. Espen Barth Eide (2012–2013)
- Poland - Radosław Sikorski (2007–2014)
- Portugal - Paulo Portas (2011–2013)
- Romania -
  1. Teodor Baconschi (2009–2012)
  2. Cristian Diaconescu (2012)
  3. Andrei Marga (2012)
  4. Titus Corlăţean (2012–2014)
- Russia - Sergey Lavrov (2004–present)
- San Marino
  1. Antonella Mularoni (2008–2012)
  2. Pasquale Valentini (2012–2016)
- Serbia -
  1. Vuk Jeremić (2007–2012)
  2. Ivan Mrkić (2012–2014)
  - Kosovo - Enver Hoxhaj (2011–2014)
- Slovakia -
  1. Mikuláš Dzurinda (2010–2012)
  2. Miroslav Lajčák (2012–2020)
- Slovenia -
  1. Samuel Žbogar (2008–2012)
  2. Karl Erjavec (2012–2018)
- Spain - José Manuel García-Margallo (2011–2016)
  - Catalonia - Francesc Homs Molist (2012–2015)
- Sweden - Carl Bildt (2006–2014)
- Switzerland - Didier Burkhalter (2012–2017)
- Ukraine
  1. Kostyantyn Gryshchenko (2010–2012)
  2. Leonid Kozhara (2012–2014)
- United Kingdom - William Hague (2010–2014)
  - Scotland - Fiona Hyslop (2009–2020)
- Vatican City - Archbishop Dominique Mamberti (2006–2014)

== North America and the Caribbean ==
- Antigua and Barbuda - Baldwin Spencer (2005–2014)
- The Bahamas -
  1. Brent Symonette (2007–2012)
  2. Fred Mitchell (2012–2017)
- Barbados - Maxine McClean (2008–2018)
- Belize - Wilfred Elrington (2008–2020)
- Canada - John Baird (2011–2015)
  - Quebec -
    1. Monique Gagnon-Tremblay (2010–2012)
    2. Jean-François Lisée (2012–2014)
- Costa Rica - Enrique Castillo (2011–2014)
- Cuba - Bruno Rodríguez Parrilla (2009–present)
- Dominica - Roosevelt Skerrit (2010–2014)
- Dominican Republic - Carlos Morales Troncoso (2004–2014)
- El Salvador - Hugo Martínez (2009–2013)
- Grenada -
  1. Karl Hood (2010–2012)
  2. Tillman Thomas (2012–2013)
- Guatemala -
  1. Haroldo Rodas (2008–2012)
  2. Harold Caballeros (2012–2013)
- Haiti -
  1. Laurent Lamothe (2011–2012)
  2. Pierre Richard Casimir (2012–2014)
- Honduras - Arturo Corrales (2011–2013)
- Jamaica -
  1. Kenneth Baugh (2007–2012)
  2. Arnold Nicholson (2012–2016)
- Mexico
  1. Patricia Espinosa (2006–2012)
  2. José Antonio Meade Kuribreña (2012–2015)
- Nicaragua - Samuel Santos López (2007–2017)
- Panama -
  1. Roberto Henríquez (2011–2012)
  2. Francisco Álvarez De Soto (acting) (2012)
  3. Rómulo Roux (2012–2013)
- Puerto Rico – Kenneth McClintock (2009–2013)
- Saint Kitts and Nevis - Sam Condor (2010–2013)
- Saint Lucia - Alva Baptiste (2011–2016)
- Saint Vincent and the Grenadines - Douglas Slater (2010–2013)
- Trinidad and Tobago -
  1. Surujrattan Rambachan (2010–2012)
  2. Winston Dookeran (2012–2015)
- United States of America - Hillary Clinton (2009–2013)

== Oceania ==
- Australia -
  1. Kevin Rudd (2010–2012)
  2. Craig Emerson (acting) (2012)
  3. Bob Carr (2012–2013)
- Fiji - Ratu Inoke Kubuabola (2009–2016)
- French Polynesia - Oscar Temaru (2011–2013)
- Kiribati - Anote Tong (2003–2016)
- Marshall Islands -
  1. John Silk (2009–2012)
  2. Phillip H. Muller (2012–2014)
- Micronesia - Lorin S. Robert (2007–2019)
- Nauru -
  1. Sprent Dabwido (2011–2012)
  2. Kieren Keke (2012–2013)
- New Zealand - Murray McCully (2008–2017)
  - Cook Islands - Tom Marsters (2010–2013)
  - Niue - Toke Talagi (2008–2020)
  - Tokelau -
    1. Foua Toloa (2011–2012)
    2. Kerisiano Kalolo (2012–2013)
- Palau - Victor Yano (2010–2013)
- Papua New Guinea -
  1. Ano Pala (2011–2012) / Paru Aihi (2011–2012) (rival government)
  2. Sir Puka Temu (2012)
  3. Rimbink Pato (2012–2019)
- Samoa - Tuilaepa Aiono Sailele Malielegaoi (1998–2021)
- Solomon Islands -
  1. Peter Shanel Agovaka (2010–2012)
  2. Clay Forau Soalaoi (2012–2014)
- Tonga - Sialeʻataongo Tuʻivakanō (2010–2014)
- Tuvalu - Apisai Ielemia (2010–2013)
- Vanuatu - Alfred Carlot (2011–2013)

== South America ==
- Argentina - Héctor Timerman (2010–2015)
- Bolivia - David Choquehuanca (2006–2017)
- Brazil - Antonio Patriota (2011–2013)
- Chile - Alfredo Moreno Charme (2010–2014)
- Colombia - María Ángela Holguín (2010–2018)
- Ecuador - Ricardo Patiño (2010–2016)
- Guyana - Carolyn Rodrigues (2008–2015)
- Paraguay -
  1. Jorge Lara Castro (2011–2012)
  2. José Félix Fernández Estigarribia (2012–2013)
- Peru - Rafael Roncagliolo (2011–2013)
- Suriname - Winston Lackin (2010–2015)
- Uruguay - Luis Almagro (2010–2015)
- Venezuela - Nicolás Maduro (2006–2013)
