= Bretton Woods Project =

The Bretton Woods Project works as a networker, information-provider, media informant and watchdog to scrutinise and influence the World Bank and International Monetary Fund (IMF). Through briefings, reports and the bimonthly digest Bretton Woods Update, it monitors projects, policy reforms and the overall management of the Bretton Woods institutions with special emphasis on environmental and social concerns.

Created as an independent initiative by a group of British non-governmental organisations (NGOs), it works with an extensive network to press for increased transparency and civil society participation in World Bank and IMF policies and interventions. This includes over, 7000 non-governmental organisations, policy-makers, journalists, researchers and parliamentarians worldwide.

By encouraging information exchange and debate, it seeks to move the Bretton Woods institutions away from simplistic approaches to development. Priority areas include:

- World Bank and IMF Roles
- structural adjustment and poverty reduction strategies (PRS)
- the environment
- social issues
- the World Bank as knowledge bank
- governance and accountability

== Publications and services ==
Bretton Woods Update is a bimonthly digest of key World Bank and IMF initiatives, controversial policy trends, projects and debate. The Update is read by around 6000 key officials, journalists, NGOs and researchers and is respected as a reliable source of information on the Bretton Woods institutions. It is available on the web, in print or can be emailed as plain text. The results of the 2006 survey of Update readers is also available.

Briefings and reports are produced to clarify issues in-depth in non-technical language.

== Networking ==
Networking and information exchange among the wide range of people and organisations interested in the World Bank and IMF is one of the key functions of the Bretton Woods Project. It is currently involved in discussions to improve the communication strategies of international financial institution (IFI) watchers, including through networking critical video on the IFIs.

In addition to NGOs, academics, parliamentarians, journalists and activists worldwide, the Project facilitates contacts with staff of the Bretton Woods institutions and decision-makers in bilateral aid ministries. It is often asked to advise NGOs in Europe, USA and the Global South planning meetings, reports and campaigns. Many members of governmental and intergovernmental organisations also contact the Bretton Woods Project for briefings or to find out about NGOs working on particular issues.

== Organisational structure and origins ==
The Bretton Woods Project was established in 1995 by the Development and Environment Group (DEG), a network of UK-based NGOs, to facilitate monitoring of the social and environmental impacts of World Bank and IMF policies and projects. The Project coordinates and consults with the UK BWI network, over 40 organisations working in development, environment and human rights. The Bretton Woods Project Steering Group, made up of some members of the DEG, meets on a regular basis to advise and review Project activities. The Project is funded by CS Mott Foundation and the Swedish Society for Nature Conservation and receives in-kind and other support from members of the Development and Environment Group. At present, ActionAid is hosting the Bretton Woods Project.

== See also ==
- Bretton Woods system
- Global financial system
- ActionAid
