= 2012 United Nations Security Council election =

Election to the United Nations Security Council

- 18 October 2012

5 of 10 non-permanent seats on the United Nations Security Council
- United Nations Security Council membership after the election Permanent members Non-permanent members
- Outgoing members South Africa (Africa) India (Asia–Pacific) Colombia (GRULAC) Germany (WEOG) Portugal (WEOG) Elected members Rwanda (Africa) South Korea (Asia–Pacific) Argentina (GRULAC) Australia (WEOG) Luxembourg (WEOG)

- Unsuccessful candidates
- Bhutan (Asia–Pacific)
- Cambodia (Asia–Pacific)
- Finland (WEOG)

The 2012 United Nations Security Council election was held on 18 October 2012 during the 67th session of the United Nations General Assembly, held at the Headquarters of the United Nations in New York City. The elections were for five non-permanent seats on the UN Security Council for two-year mandates commencing on 1 January 2013 to replace the five countries whose terms expired. The countries elected were Argentina, Australia, Luxembourg, the Republic of Korea, and Rwanda with Luxembourg being elected for the first time.

== Rules ==
In accordance with the rotation rules whereby the ten non-permanent UNSC seats rotate among the various regional blocs into which UN member states traditionally divide themselves for voting and representation purposes, the five available seats were allocated as follows:

- One for the African Group (previously held by South Africa)
- One for the Asia-Pacific Group (previously held by India)
- One for the Latin American and Caribbean Group (previously held by Colombia)
- Two for the Western European and Others Group (previously held by Germany and Portugal)

The election was for the term from 1 January 2013 to 31 December 2014.

== Candidates ==
=== African Group ===
Rwanda

=== Asia-Pacific Group ===
Bhutan
Cambodia
South Korea

=== Latin American and Caribbean Group ===
Argentina

=== Western European and Others Group ===
Australia
Finland
Luxembourg

== Rwanda controversy ==
Prior to the actual vote, the representative of the Democratic Republic of the Congo rose to speak and said that Rwanda "was an oasis for criminals" operating in the eastern part of the Democratic Republic of the Congo, and on those grounds, she objected to Rwanda as a non-permanent member of the UN Security Council. A confidential UN report was also leaked before the election, which stated that Rwanda is involved in the current conflict in the eastern DRC and that "Rwandan officials exercise overall command and strategic planning for M23 ... Rwanda continues to violate the arms embargo through direct military support to M23 rebels, facilitation of recruitment, encouragement and facilitation of FARDC (Congolese army) desertions as well as the provision of arms and ammunition, intelligence, and political advice." Rwandan UN representative Olivier Nduhungirehe responded by saying, "The members of the General Assembly know exactly what our record is and they cannot be deterred or swayed by a baseless report, which has no credibility."

== Results ==
Argentina, Australia, and Rwanda were elected in the first round of voting, while Luxembourg and the Republic of Korea were elected in the second. In both rounds, 193 voting papers were distributed.

=== African and Asia-Pacific Groups ===
African and Asia-Pacific Groups election results
Member	Round 1	Round 2
Rwanda	148	—
South Korea	116	149
Cambodia	62	43
Bhutan	20	—
Tanzania	3	—
Democratic Republic of the Congo	1	—
valid ballots	192	192
invalid ballots	0	1
abstentions	1	0
present and voting	191	192
required majority	128	128

=== Latin American and Caribbean Group ===
Latin American and Caribbean Group election results
Member	Round 1
Argentina	182
Barbados	1
Cuba	1
valid ballots	192
invalid ballots	1
abstentions	8
present and voting	184
required majority	123

=== Western European and Others Group ===
Western European and Others Group election results
Member	Round 1	Round 2
Australia	140	—
Luxembourg	128	131
Finland	108	62
valid ballots	193	193
abstentions	0	0
present and voting	193	193
required majority	129	129

== See also ==
- List of members of the United Nations Security Council
- Australia and the United Nations
- Korea and the United Nations
- European Union and the United Nations
