= Russia–Africa Summit =

The Russia-Africa Summit is an international forum between the Russian Federation and the countries of African Union.

Specific Russia-Africa Summits may also refer to:

- Russia–Africa Summit 2019, held in Sochi
- Russia–Africa Summit 2023, held in Saint Petersburg
- Russia–Africa Summit 2026, held in Moscow

== See also ==
- G7 (disambiguation)
