= Group of Seven (disambiguation) =

The Group of Seven (G7) is an intergovernmental political and economic forum.

Group of Seven may also refer to:

- Group of Seven (artists), a group of Canadian landscape painters 1920–1933
- Group of Seven, or Metcalf Chateau, a group of American artists with ties to Honolulu

== See also ==
- G7 (disambiguation)
- G8, the G7 forum before the expulsion of Russia
- Group 7 element, a group of elements in the periodic table
- Group of Seven Plus, an intergovernmental voluntary organisation
