= United Nations General Assembly observers =

Non-member observer states of the UN

The United Nations General Assembly (UNGA) may grant observer status to non-member states, international organizations and other entities to enable them to participate in the work of the UNGA. The General Assembly determines the privileges it will grant to each observer, beyond those laid down in a 1986 Conference on treaties between states and international organizations. As of 2026, two non-member states (the Holy See and the State of Palestine) have been granted this status, as have many international organizations and other entities. The European Union (EU) was in 2011 granted the right to speak in debates, to submit proposals and amendments, the right of reply, to raise points of order and to circulate documents, making it the only international organization to hold these enhanced rights, which has been likened to the rights of full membership, short of the right to vote.

== Procedure ==
The General Assembly may invite non-member entities to participate in the work of the United Nations without formal membership, and has done so on numerous occasions. Such participants are described as observers. Observer status may be granted by a United Nations General Assembly resolution. The status of a permanent observer is based purely on practice of the General Assembly, and there are no provisions for it in the United Nations Charter.

The practice is to distinguish between state and non-state observers. Non-member states are members of one or more specialized agencies, and can apply for permanent observer state status. Non-state observers are the international organizations and other entities.

== Non-member observer states ==
Most former non-member observer states accepted observer status at a time when they had applied for membership but were unable to attain it, due to the actual or threatened veto by one or more of the permanent members of the Security Council. The grant of observer status is made by the General Assembly only; it is not subject to a Security Council veto.

In some circumstances a state may elect to become an observer rather than full member. For example, to preserve its neutrality while participating in its work, Switzerland chose to remain a permanent non-member state observer from 1948 until it became a member in 2002.

=== Current non-member observer states ===
As of November 2025, there are two permanent non-member observer states in the General Assembly of the United Nations: the Holy See and the State of Palestine. Both were described as "Non-Member States having received a standing invitation to participate as Observers in the sessions and the work of the General Assembly and maintaining Permanent Observer Missions at Headquarters".

The Holy See was granted its non-member observer state status in 1964, representing the Vatican City State. The Holy See did not wish to join the United Nations as a member because "Membership in the organization would not seem to be consonant with the provisions of Article 24 of the Lateran Treaty, particularly as regards spiritual status and participation in possible use of force." Since April 6, 1964, the Holy See has accepted permanent observer state status, which was regarded as a diplomatic courtesy, to enable the Holy See to participate in the UN's humanitarian activities and in the promotion of peace.

In 1974, the Palestine Liberation Organization (PLO) was recognized as an observer to represent the people of Palestine. In 2012, its observer status was changed from "non-member observer entity" to "non-member observer state" and its name was changed to "State of Palestine", which many called "symbolic". The change followed an application by Palestine for full UN membership in 2011 as part of the Palestine 194 campaign, to provide additional leverage to the Palestinians in their dealings with Israel. The application had not been put to a UN Security Council vote. With the change in status, the United Nations Secretariat held that Palestine was entitled to become a party to treaties for which the UN Secretary-General is the depositary. On 17 December 2012, UN Chief of Protocol, Yeocheol Yoon, declared that "the designation of 'State of Palestine' shall be used by the Secretariat in all official United Nations documents."

The seating in the General Assembly Hall is arranged with non-member observer states being seated immediately after UN member states, and before other observers. On 10 September 2015, the General Assembly resolved to approve the raising at the UN of the flags of non-member observer states alongside those of the 193 UN member states.

Non-member state	Date granted observer status	Additional timeline and details
Holy See	6 April 1964: granted permanent observer state status 1 July 2004: gained all the rights of full membership except voting rights, submission of resolution proposals without co-sponsoring, and putting forward candidates (A/RES/58/314)	The sovereign entity with statehood over the territory of the Vatican City State.
State of Palestine	14 October 1974: UN General Assembly recognized the Palestine Liberation Organization (PLO) as the representative of Palestinians, and granted it the right to participate in General Assembly deliberations on the question of Palestine in plenary meetings (A/RES/3210 (XXIX))22 November 1974: non-state observer status granted to the PLO (A/RES/3237 (XXIX)); 9 December 1988: granted the right to circulate communications without an intermediary (A/RES/43/160); 15 December 1988: designation changed to "Palestine" (A/RES/43/177); 7 July 1998: granted additional rights, including the right to participate in general debate (A/RES/52/250); 29 November 2012: status changed to non-member observer state (A/RES/67/19): 16 October 2018: temporarily granted additional rights while Chair of the Group of 77 for 2019 (A/RES/73/5). 10 May 2024: granted additional rights, including to be seated with member states, introduce proposals and agenda items, and participate in committees, but not the right to vote (A/ES-10/23).	28 October 1974: PLO recognized as "sole legitimate representative of the Palestinian people", by the 7th Arab League summit (and later by over 100 states with which it holds diplomatic relations and by Israel). 22 November 1974: PLO recognized as competent on all matters concerning the question of Palestine by the General Assembly in addition to the right of Palestinians in Palestine to national independence and sovereignty. 15 November 1988: PLO unilaterally declared the State of Palestine. 4 May 1994: PLO established the Palestinian National Authority territorial administration per the Oslo Accords signed by the PLO, Israel, US and Russia. 7 July 1998: PLO assigned seating in the General Assembly Hall after non-member states and before other observers. 23 September 2011: applied for UN membership 17 December 2012: UN Chief of Protocol Yeocheol Yoon decides "the designation of 'State of Palestine' shall be used by the Secretariat in all official United Nations documents."

Notes:

- The Cook Islands and Niue, both states in free association with New Zealand, are members of several UN specialized agencies, and have had their "full treaty-making capacity" recognized by the UN Secretariat in 1992 and 1994 respectively. The Cook Islands has expressed a desire to become a UN member state, but New Zealand has said that they would not support the application without a change in their constitutional relationship, in particular the right of Cook Islanders to New Zealand citizenship.
- The Republic of China (ROC), commonly known as Taiwan, was a founding member of the UN representing China, which has been divided between the ROC and the People's Republic of China (PRC) since the end of the Chinese Civil War. However, the 1971 General Assembly Resolution 2758 transferred China's seat in the UN from the ROC to the PRC. Since then, Taiwan has sought to resume its participation in UN activities. Various methods were considered, including seeking observer status, but ultimately the ROC chose to submit more vague requests which did not specify the form of participation it sought between 1993 and 2006. These requests have been consistently denied due to the UN's recognition of the PRC as the "legitimate representative of China to the United Nations". The UN Secretary-General concluded from the resolution that the General Assembly considered Taiwan to be a province of China rather than an independent country, and thus ineligible to become party to treaties for which the UN Secretary-General is the depositary.
- The UN recognizes 17 non-self-governing territories "whose people have not yet attained a full measure of self-government"; they are represented at the UN by their respective administering power. However, Western Sahara's administering power, Spain, unilaterally abandoned its responsibilities for the territory in 1976. The Polisario Front has since been recognized as the legitimate representative of Western Sahara and is occasionally invited to speak as the territory's representative before the Special Committee on Decolonization, but it has never been conferred General Assembly observer status.

=== Former non-member observer states ===
Sixteen former non-member states were also granted observer status. Fourteen of those states eventually became members of the United Nations. The other three constitute a single special case. (Note: The State of Vietnam was the predecessor state of the Republic of Vietnam (South Vietnam). On 30 April 1975, South Vietnam was taken over by North Vietnamese forces. In July 1975, North Vietnam and the Republic of South Vietnam sent representatives to the United Nations to pursue admission. On 2 July 1976, North Vietnam and the Republic of South Vietnam unified to form the Socialist Republic of Vietnam, which was also recorded as holding observer status at the UN. The UN General Assembly resolutions and decisions for the 30th and 31st sessions do not record the decision to grant observer status, but Resolution 31/21 of 26 November 1976 does refer to the "Permanent Observer of the Socialist Republic of Viet Nam to the United Nations". Viet Nam became a member of the UN on 20 September 1977.)

Most of the former non-member observer states accepted this status at a time when they had applied for membership but were unable to attain it, due to the (actual or threatened) veto of one or more of the permanent members of the Security Council. The vetoes were later overcome either by changes in geopolitical circumstances, or by "package deals" under which the Security Council approved multiple new member states at the same time, as was done with a dozen countries in 1955 and with East and West Germany in 1973.

State	Granted	Became full member	Period
Republic of Austria	1952	1955	3 years
People's Republic of Bangladesh	1973	1974	1 year
Republic of Finland	1952	1955	3 years
Federal Republic of Germany	1952	1973	21 years
German Democratic Republic	1972	1973	1 year
Italian Republic	1952	1955	3 years
Japan	1952	1956	4 years
Republic of Korea	1949	1991	42 years
Democratic People's Republic of Korea	1973	1991	18 years
State of Kuwait	1962	1963	1 year
Principality of Monaco	1956	1993	37 years
Spanish State	1955	1955	0 years
Swiss Confederation	1946	2002	56 years
State of Vietnam Republic of Vietnam	1952	—	23 years
Republic of South Vietnam	1975	—	1 year
Democratic Republic of Vietnam	1975	—	1 year
Socialist Republic of Vietnam	1976	1977	1 year

== Entities and international organizations ==
Many intergovernmental organizations and a few other entities (non-governmental organizations and others with various degrees of statehood or sovereignty), are invited to become observers at the General Assembly. Some of them maintain a permanent office in the United Nations headquarters in New York City, while others do not; however, this is the choice of the organization and does not imply differences in their status.

=== Regional organization allowed by their member states to speak on their behalf ===
The European Economic Community was granted observer status at the UNGA through Resolution 3208 in 1974. The Treaty of Lisbon in 2009 resulted in the delegates being accredited to its successor, the European Union. It was accorded full rights in the General Assembly, bar the right to vote and put forward candidates, via UNGA Resolution A/RES/65/276 on 3 May 2011. The EU is party to some 50 international UN agreements as the only non-state participant. It is a full participant on the Commission on Sustainable Development, the Forum on Forests and the Food and Agriculture Organization. It has also been a full participant at certain UN summits, such as the Rio and Kyoto summits on climate change, including hosting a summit. Furthermore, the EU delegation maintains close relations with the UN's aid bodies. In 2011 the EU was granted enhanced powers in the General Assembly; the right to speak in debates, to submit proposals and amendments, the right of reply, to raise points of order and to circulate documents. These rights were also made open to other international organizations who requested them, if their members have given them the right to speak on their behalf.

In the resolution adopted in May 2011 granting additional rights to the European Union the UNGA decided that similar arrangements may be adopted for any other regional organization that is allowed to speak on behalf of its member states.

Organization or entity	Date observer status was granted	Entity type
European Union (Note: Originally under the designation of European Communities. The EC formally became the EU on 1 December 2009 and was acknowledged by 2011.)	11 October 1974 (A/RES/3208 (XXIX)): observer status 10 May 2011 (A/RES/65/276): additional rights	The only observer that operates through a hybrid system of intergovernmentalism and supranationalism, giving it some state-like qualities. Since 2011, the EU has held "enhanced observer status" in the General Assembly, granting it additional privileges as an observer—including the right to submit proposals and to speak—which distinguishes it from other international organizations.

=== Intergovernmental organizations ===
Those organizations that have permanent offices at the UN headquarters are marked with an asterisk (*).

Organization	Date observer status was granted
African Development Bank	28 Oct 1987 (A/RES/42/10)
African Union* formerly the Organisation of African Unity	11 Oct 1965 (A/RES/2011(XX)); 15 Aug 2002 (General Assembly decision 56/475)
Agency for the Prohibition of Nuclear Weapons in Latin America and the Caribbean	17 Oct 1988 (A/RES/43/6)
Andean Community	22 Oct 1997 (A/RES/52/6)
Arab League, formally the League of Arab States*	1 Nov 1950 (A/RES/477 (V))
ASEAN+3 Macroeconomic Research Office	7 Dec 2017 (A/RES/72/126)
Asian–African Legal Consultative Organization* formerly the Asian–African Legal Consultative Committee	13 Oct 1980 (A/RES/35/2)
Asian Development Bank	19 Nov 2002 (A/RES/57/30)
Asian Forest Cooperation Organization (AFoCO)	15 Dec 2020 (A/RES/75/149)
Asian Infrastructure Investment Bank	20 Dec 2018 (A/RES/73/216)
Association of Caribbean States	15 Oct 1998 (A/RES/53/5)
(ASEAN) Association of Southeast Asian Nations	4 Dec 2006 (A/RES/61/44)
Caribbean Community (CARICOM)*	17 Oct 1991 (A/RES/46/8)
CAF – Development Bank of Latin America and the Caribbean formerly the Andean Development Corporation	14 Dec 2012 (A/RES/67/101)
Central American Bank for Economic Integration	13 Dec 2016 (A/RES/71/157)
Central American Integration System (SICA)*	19 Oct 1995 (A/RES/50/2)
Central Asia Regional Economic Cooperation Program (CAREC)	22 Dec 2020 (A/RES/75/148)
Central European Initiative	13 Jan 2012 (A/RES/66/111)
Collective Security Treaty Organization	2 Dec 2004 (A/RES/59/50)
Common Fund for Commodities	23 Nov 2005 (A/RES/60/26)
Commonwealth of Independent States	24 Mar 1994 (A/RES/48/237)
Commonwealth Secretariat*	18 Oct 1976 (A/RES/31/3)
Community of Portuguese Language Countries	26 Oct 1999 (A/RES/54/10)
Community of Sahel–Saharan States	12 Dec 2001 (A/RES/56/92)
Conference of Ministers of Justice of the Ibero-American Countries	21 Dec 2016 (A/RES/71/153)
Conference on Interaction and Confidence-Building Measures in Asia	6 Dec 2007 (A/RES/62/77)
Council of Europe	17 Oct 1989 (A/RES/44/6)
Developing Eight Countries Organization for Economic Cooperation	18 Dec 2014 (A/RES/69/129)
East African Community	9 Dec 2003 (A/RES/58/86)
Economic Community of Central African States*	12 Dec 2000 (A/RES/55/161)
(ECOWAS) Economic Community of Western African States*	2 Dec 2004 (A/RES/59/51)
Economic Cooperation Organization	13 Oct 1993 (A/RES/48/2)
Energy Charter Conference	6 Dec 2007 (A/RES/62/75)
Eurasian Development Bank	6 Dec 2007 (A/RES/62/76)
Eurasian Economic Union formerly the Eurasian Economic Community	9 Dec 2003 (A/RES/58/84)
Eurasian Group on Combating Money Laundering and Financing of Terrorism	7 Dec 2017 (A/RES/72/127)
European Organization for Nuclear Research (CERN)	14 Dec 2012 (A/RES/67/102)
European Public Law Organisation	11 Jan 2019 (A/RES/73/215)
Fund for the Development of the Indigenous Peoples of Latin America and the Caribbean	18 Dec 2017 (A/RES/72/128)
Global Dryland Alliance	22 Dec 2020 (A/RES/75/150)
Global Fund to Fight AIDS, Tuberculosis and Malaria	16 Dec 2009 (A/RES/64/122)
Global Green Growth Institute	16 Aug 2013 (A/RES/68/191)
Group of Seven Plus	18 Dec 2019 (A/RES/74/196)
GUAM Organization for Democracy and Economic Development	9 Dec 2003 (A/RES/58/85)
Gulf Cooperation Council, formally the Cooperation Council for the Arab States of the Gulf*	6 Dec 2007 (A/RES/62/78)
Hague Conference on Private International Law	23 Nov 2005 (A/RES/60/27)
Ibero-American Conference	23 Nov 2005 (A/RES/60/28)
Indian Ocean Commission	4 Dec 2006 (A/RES/61/43)
Indian Ocean Rim Association	18 Dec 2015 (A/RES/70/123)
Inter-American Development Bank	12 Dec 2000 (A/RES/55/160)
International Centre for Migration Policy Development	19 Nov 2002 (A/RES/57/31)
International Chamber of Commerce*	21 Dec 2016 (A/RES/71/156)
International Conference on the Great Lakes Region (ICGLR)	16 Dec 2009 (A/RES/64/123)
International Criminal Police Organization (Interpol)*	15 Oct 1996 (A/RES/51/1)
International Development Law Organization*	12 Dec 2001 (A/RES/56/90)
International Fund for Saving the Aral Sea (IFAS)	11 Dec 2008 (A/RES/63/133)
International Hydrographic Organization	12 Dec 2001 (A/RES/56/91)
International Institute for Democracy and Electoral Assistance*	9 Dec 2003 (A/RES/58/83)
International Institute for the Unification of Private Law (UNIDROIT)	18 Dec 2013 (A/RES/68/121)
International Network for Bamboo and Rattan	7 Dec 2017 (A/RES/72/125)
International Organization of the Francophonie*	10 Nov 1978 (A/RES/33/18); 18 December 1998 (General Assembly decision 53/453)
International Renewable Energy Agency*	13 Jan 2012 (A/RES/66/110)
International Solar Alliance	10 Dec 2021 (A/RES/76/123)
International Union for Conservation of Nature*	17 Dec 1999 (A/RES/54/195)
International Youth Organisation for Ibero-America*	21 Dec 2016 (A/RES/71/154)
Islamic Development Bank Group (IDB)	28 Mar 2007 (A/RES/61/259)
Italian–Latin American Institute	6 Dec 2007 (A/RES/62/74)
Latin American Economic System (SELA)	13 Oct 1980 (A/RES/35/3)
Latin American Integration Association	23 Nov 2005 (A/RES/60/25)
Latin American Parliament	13 Oct 1993 (A/RES/48/4)
OPEC Fund for International Development	4 Dec 2006 (A/RES/61/42)
Organisation for Economic Co-operation and Development (OECD)*	15 Oct 1998 (A/RES/53/6)
Organisation of African, Caribbean and Pacific States formerly the African, Caribbean and Pacific Group of States	15 Oct 1981 (A/RES/36/4)
Organisation of Eastern Caribbean States	2 Dec 2004 (A/RES/59/52)
Organisation of Islamic Cooperation* formerly the Organisation of the Islamic Conference	10 Oct 1975 (A/RES/3369 (XXX))
Organization of the Black Sea Economic Cooperation	8 Oct 1999 (A/RES/54/5)
Organization for Security and Co-operation in Europe (OSCE)	13 Oct 1993 (A/RES/48/5)
Organization of American States (OAS)*	16 Oct 1948 (A/RES/253 (III))
Pacific Islands Forum	17 Oct 1994 (A/RES/49/1)
Parliamentary Assembly of the Mediterranean*	16 Dec 2009 (A/RES/64/124)
Partners in Population and Development*	19 Nov 2002 (A/RES/57/29)
Permanent Court of Arbitration	13 Oct 1993 (A/RES/48/3)
Regional Centre on Small Arms and Light Weapons in the Great Lakes Region, the Horn of Africa and Bordering States (RECSA)	6 Dec 2007 (A/RES/62/73)
Shanghai Cooperation Organisation	2 Dec 2004 (A/RES/59/48)
South Asian Association for Regional Cooperation	2 Dec 2004 (A/RES/59/53)
South Centre*	11 Dec 2008 (A/RES/63/131)
Southern African Development Community (SADC)	2 Dec 2004 (A/RES/59/49)
Union for the Mediterranean (UfM)	18 Dec 2015 (ARES/70/124)
Union of South American Nations (UNASUR)	9 Dec 2011 (A/RES/66/484)
University for Peace*	11 Dec 2008 (A/RES/63/132)
World Customs Organization formerly the Customs Cooperation Council	23 Mar 1999 (A/RES/53/216)

=== Specialized agencies and related organizations ===
Some of UN Specialized agencies and related organizations are having liaison offices at the UN headquarters, some were auto-granted since their establishment (i.e. without passing General Assembly resolutions).

Organization or entity	Date observer status was granted
Food and Agriculture Organization	
International Atomic Energy Agency	
International Criminal Court (Note: Not to be confused with the International Court of Justice, one of the six principal organs of the UN)	13 Sep 2004 (A/RES/58/318)
International Fund for Agricultural Development	
International Labour Organization	
International Monetary Fund	
International Organization for Migration	16 Oct 1992 (A/RES/47/4)
International Seabed Authority	24 Oct 1996 (A/RES/51/6)
International Telecommunication Union	
International Tribunal for the Law of the Sea	17 Dec 1996 (A/RES/51/204)
Preparatory Commission for the Comprehensive Nuclear-Test-Ban Treaty Organization	
United Nations Educational, Scientific and Cultural Organization	
United Nations Industrial Development Organization	
World Bank	
World Health Organization	
World Intellectual Property Organization	
World Meteorological Organization	

=== Other entities ===
All five entities maintain permanent offices at the UN headquarters.

Organization or entity	Date observer status was granted
International Committee of the Red Cross	16 Oct 1990 (A/RES/45/6)
International Federation of Red Cross and Red Crescent Societies	19 Oct 1994 (A/RES/49/2)
International Olympic Committee	20 Oct 2009 (A/RES/64/3)
Inter-Parliamentary Union	19 Nov 2002 (A/RES/57/32)
Sovereign Military Order of Malta	24 Aug 1994 (A/RES/48/265)

=== Former observers ===
Organization or entity	Date observer status was granted	Entity type
South West Africa People's Organization (SWAPO)	1976 (A/RES/31/152)	SWAPO, a liberation movement in South West Africa, held observer status with the right to circulate communications without intermediary beginning in 1976. This terminated in 1990 when the Republic of Namibia attained independence and was granted full membership in the United Nations and SWAPO was transformed into a political party.

== See also ==
- Member states of the United Nations
- List of current permanent representatives to the United Nations
- List of active national liberation movements recognized by intergovernmental organizations
- Category:United Nations General Assembly observers
