= G7 (disambiguation) =

G7 is the Group of Seven, a group of seven industrialized nations, formed by Canada, France, Germany, Italy, Japan, the United Kingdom and the United States.

G7 or G.VII may also refer to:

== Military ==
- G7 howitzer, a light howitzer developed by the South African arms company Denel
- Gotha G.VII, a 1918 German bomber aircraft
- HMCS Athabaskan (G07), a 1941 destroyer of the Canadian Navy
- Spanish submarine G-7, a 1947 submarine

== Music ==
- G7 (guitar software), a music notation program for guitarists & songwriters
- G7, a seventh chord in music
- G7 Welcoming Committee Records, a record label

== Technology ==
- G7 Series, gaming laptops in the Dell G Series
- Canon PowerShot G7, a prosumer digital camera
- LG G7, a smartphone by LG Electronics
- Logitech Laser G7, a computer mouse
- Moto G7, a series of Motorola smartphones
- G7 Method (grayscale plus seven colors), a printing industry specification
- Dexcom G7, device for glucose monitoring for people with diabetes

== Transportation ==
- G7, the Cityrail train set involved in the Waterfall rail accident
- G7 Beijing–Ürümqi Expressway, an expressway in China
- Gandalf Airlines (IATA airline designator), Italy
- GoJet Airlines (IATA airline designator), US
- HSR-350x (project name G7), a Korean high-speed rail prototype train

== Other uses ==
- G7 coffee, an instant coffee brand of Trung Nguyên
- Group of Seven (artists), group of Canadian artists
- G7 Spectral Class of star
- Group of Seven Plus (g7+), a global organization that promotes peace and stability in conflict-raged or fragile countries — composed of 20 countries from Africa, Asia-Pacific, Middle East and the Caribbean

== See also ==
- G8 (Group of Eight), the G7 before the expulsion of Russia in 2014
- 7G (disambiguation)
- Group of Seven (disambiguation)
- G7a torpedo, steam-powered
- G7e torpedo, electric-powered
- G7es torpedo, a series of torpedoes used by the German Kriegsmarine during World War II
