= 2026 Russia–Africa Summit =

International summit in Saint Petersburg

The 2026 Russia–Africa Summit was the third Russia–Africa Summit, held at the Moscow Kremlin, in Moscow, Russia, on 28 and 29 October 2026.

== Attendees ==
Group photograph of participants at the Russia–Africa Summit in Moscow, 29 October 2026

=== Hosts ===
Russian President Vladimir Putin and Burundian President Évariste Ndayishimiye in Moscow, 28 October 2026

- Vladimir Putin, President of Russia
- Évariste Ndayishimiye, President of Burundi and Chairperson of the African Union

=== Other representatives ===
Several countries sent presidents, prime ministers, and other representatives:

Putin and Ghanaian President John Dramani Mahama in Moscow, 28 October 2026

Putin and Congolese President Félix Tshisekedi in Moscow, 28 October 2026

- Mahamoud Ali Youssouf, Chairperson of the African Union Commission
- Faustin-Archange Touadéra, President of the Central African Republic
- Azali Assoumani, President of the Comoros
- Félix Tshisekedi, President of the Democratic Republic of the Congo
- Denis Sassou Nguesso, President of the Republic of the Congo
- Abdel Fattah el-Sisi, President of Egypt
- Abiy Ahmed, Prime Minister of Ethiopia
- Mohamed Ould Ghazouani, President of Mauritania
- Fatima Ezzahra El Mansouri, Prime Minister of Morocco
- Sifi Ghrieb, Prime Minister of Algeria
- Mohamed al-Menfi, Chairman of the Presidential Council of Libya
- Sara Zaafarani, Prime Minister of Tunisia
- Michael Randrianirina, President of Madagascar
- Netumbo Nandi-Ndaitwah, President of Namibia
- William Ruto, President of Kenya
- Teodoro Obiang Nguema Mbasogo, President of Equatorial Guinea
- John Mahama, President of Ghana
- Justin Nsengiyumva, Prime Minister of Rwanda
- Emmerson Mnangagwa, President of Zimbabwe
- Isaias Afwerki, President of Eritrea
- Assimi Goita, Interim President of Mali
- Daniel Chapo, President of Mozambique
- Abdourahamane Tiani, President of Niger
- Abdel Fattah al-Burhan, President of Sudan
- Salva Kiir, President of South Sudan
- Faure Gnassingbé, Prime Minister of Togo
- Jessica Alupo, Vice President of Uganda

== See also ==
- 2019 Russia–Africa Summit
- 2023 Russia–Africa Summit
