= Regional Centre on Small Arms and Light Weapons in the Great Lakes Region, the Horn of Africa and Bordering States =

- Formation: 2005
- Type: International organization
- Headquarters: Nairobi, Kenya
- Website: http://www.recsasec.org

The Regional Center for Small Arms and Light Weapons in the Great Lakes Region, the Horn of Africa and Bordering States (RECSA) is an international organization working to limit the spread of small and light weapons in the countries of Central Africa and the Horn of Africa. It was established in 2005 and has 15 member states. The head office is located in Nairobi, Kenya.

RECSA has the status of permanent observer in the UN General Assembly.
