= 7G =

7G or 7-G can refer to:

- 7G-Tronic, a Mercedes-Benz seven-speed automatic transmission
- 7/G Rainbow Colony, a 2004 Indian film by Selvaraghavan
  - 7/G Rainbow Colony 2, its sequel
- 7/G, a 2024 Indian film
- 7G (album), a 2020 album by A. G. Cook
- IATA code for StarFlyer
- F-7G, a model of Chengdu J-7
- Sector 7G, Homer Simpson's sector at work; see Springfield (The Simpsons)
- Rearwin Ken-Royce 7G, an engine model by LeBlond Aircraft Engine Corporation
- Operator 7G, the title by which EVE refers to Shogo Yahagi and Eiji Takanaka in the Megazone 23 anime OAV series.
- 7G, the production code for the 1987 Doctor Who serial Dragonfire
- The 7G incident, a fictional introduction of seventh-generation cellular network in the anime Train to the End of the World

== See also ==
- G7 (disambiguation)
