= Palestine 194 =

Diplomatic campaign

Palestine 194 is an ongoing diplomatic campaign by the Palestinian National Authority to gain membership in the United Nations for the State of Palestine. The name of the campaign is a reference to Palestine becoming the 194th member of the UN. The UN campaign is part of a strategy to gain international recognition of the State of Palestine, based on the borders prior to the Six-Day War, with East Jerusalem as its capital. The initiative developed during a two-year impasse in negotiations with Israel that followed the latter's refusal to freeze its settlement activities in the West Bank. The campaign was reported in the media as early as late 2009, and gained prominence during the leadup to the 66th Session of the General Assembly in September 2011. Palestinian President Mahmoud Abbas submitted the application to the Secretary-General Ban Ki-moon on 23 September 2011, which the Security Council has yet to vote on.

The campaign was formally backed by the Arab League in May 2011, and was officially confirmed by the Palestine Liberation Organization on 26 June 2011. The application was labelled by the Israeli government a unilateral step, while the Palestinian government argued it was essential to overcome the current impasse in negotiations. Several other countries, such as Germany and Canada, have also rejected the application and called for a prompt return to negotiations. Others, however, such as Norway and Russia, have endorsed the plan. The Secretary-General stated, "UN members are entitled whether to vote for or against the Palestinian statehood recognition at the UN."

With the failure to achieve a U.N. Security Council vote for membership, in September 2012, the Palestinian Authority submitted a draft General Assembly resolution to accord non-member observer state status to Palestine, which the General Assembly passed on 29 November 2012.

== Background ==
Boundaries defined in the 1947 UN Partition Plan for Palestine: Area assigned for a Jewish state Area assigned for an Arab state Planned Corpus separatum with the intention that Jerusalem would be neither Jewish nor Arab Armistice Demarcation Lines of 1949 (Green Line): Israel per 1949 armistice lines West Jerusalem and other areas under Israeli control from 1949 Gaza and the West Bank (including East Jerusalem) under Egyptian and Jordanian control till 1967

On 29 November 1947, the United Nations General Assembly approved a partition plan to provide for the termination of the British Mandate for Palestine and the partition of its lands into Arab and Jewish independent states. The partition was rejected by the Arab Palestinians and the Arab League. The expiration of the mandate on 15 May 1948 saw the declaration of the State of Israel and the subsequent invasion of the former mandate territories by neighbouring Arab states. The ensuing Arab–Israeli War, which saw the end of hostilities in 1949 following a series of armistice agreements between belligerents states, resulted in demarcation of the Gaza Strip to Egypt, the West Bank to Jordan, the Golan Heights to Syrian and the rest to Israel. Further change came in June 1967 when Israel won the Six-Day War and occupied the territory previously gained by the Arab states.

The Palestine Liberation Organization (PLO) was accorded observer status within the United Nations on 22 November 1974, having been recognised as the sole legitimate representative of the Palestinian people. The State of Palestine was proclaimed on 15 November 1988 in Algiers at an extraordinary session in exile of the Palestine National Council, citing the partition plan of 1947 as legal justification. In acknowledgement of the declaration, the United Nations upgraded the observer seat of the PLO and accorded it the designation "Palestine", without explicitly referring to it as a state.

At the Security Council in 1989, the PLO representative acknowledged that 94 member states—at that time a majority—had recognised the new Palestinian state. It subsequently attempted to gain membership as a state in several agencies connected to the United Nations, but its efforts were thwarted by threats from the United States to withhold funding from any organisation that admitted Palestine, and laws which were enacted in order to make such a reaction automatic. Consequently, applications and letters of accession to various treaties were either withdrawn or deferred indefinitely. As a consequence, in November 1989, the Arab League proposed a General Assembly resolution to formally recognise the PLO as the government of an independent Palestinian state. The draft, however, was abandoned when the U.S. again threatened to cut off its financing for the United Nations should the vote go ahead. The Arab states agreed not to press the resolution, but demanded that the U.S. promise not to threaten the United Nations with financial sanctions again.

The PLO subsequently committed itself to peace negotiations with Israel brokered by the international community. These began with the Madrid Conference in 1991, and resulted in the signing of the Oslo Accords in 1993, leading to the creation of the Palestinian National Authority. In 2002, a Quartet of third-party brokers developed a road map for peace aimed at achieving a viable solution to the conflict including the establishment of a Palestinian state. The current outline for a solution was determined and agreed to by both parties during the Annapolis Conference of 2007.

Israel was admitted as a member of the United Nations in May 1949, on its third application. The final resolution approved its admission on the conditions that it implement the 1947 partition plan and Resolution 194 of December 1948, which called for the return of refugees.

=== Causes ===
The push for a statehood resolution at the United Nations is seen as a result of growing frustration among Palestinians over the lack of progress in negotiations, and over the continued expansion of Israeli settlements in the West Bank. In 2008, The New York Times reported that, "Even among the most moderate Palestinians, the credo of a negotiated two-state solution to the Israeli–Palestinian conflict is beginning to erode". Scholar Abdallah Schleifer described "a sense among Palestinians of almost desperation, that they are being left behind, that the focus for the achievement of a Palestinian two-state solution, a Palestinian state living alongside an Israeli state based on negotiations, has collapsed." In August 2008, the Palestine Strategy Group, composed of government officials, researchers and advisers, published a new strategic position recommending that the leadership transfer the conflict to the United Nations.

One of the common misgivings amongst Palestinians about the negotiation process is the inability of the PLO to negotiate with Israel as an equal. The PLO has therefore said that global recognition of the Palestinian state is an opportunity to formally level the playing field and create a situation in which two state partners can negotiate as equals.

In 2009, the government of Prime Minister Salam Fayyad developed a state-building programme aimed at establishing viable institutions capable of providing effective governance despite the occupation. The agenda was published in August and gave a deadline of two years for the establishment of an independent and viable Palestinian state. The plan was backed by the European Union, which provided financial and practical assistance to its development. Also in 2009, U.S. President Barack Obama delivered a speech in which he became the first U.S. president to endorse the 1967 borders as the basis for a Palestinian state. He brokered direct negotiations between Israel and Palestine the following year, and at the General Assembly session in September 2010, he set a one-year deadline for these negotiations to produce an independent, sovereign state of Palestine admitted as a member. Negotiations broke down the following month, however, when Prime Minister Benjamin Netanyahu refused to extend his government's moratorium on settlement construction in the West Bank, prompting the Palestinians to disengage. President Mahmoud Abbas labelled these settlements as unilateral actions aimed at imposing "facts on the ground" and as "the primary obstacle to any peace process".

Towards the end of 2010, the World Bank released a report that found the PNA "well-positioned to establish a state" at any point in the near future. The report highlighted, however, that unless private-sector growth in the economy was stimulated, a Palestinian state would remain donor dependent. In December, the EU acknowledged the progress made in the state-building programme, and several member states agreed to grant diplomatic status to the Palestinian representations in their capitals. In April 2011, the UN's co-ordinator for the Middle East peace process issued a report on the progress made in this area, describing "aspects of its administration as sufficient for an independent state". It echoed a similar assessment published the week prior by the International Monetary Fund.

In July 2011, the PLO published a paper stating that its quest for international recognition of the State of Palestine is aimed at protecting the viability of the two-state solution, and that it is not intended as a substitute for negotiations. It claimed that recognition "strengthens the possibility of reaching a just and lasting peace based on the terms of reference accepted by the international community as the basis for resolving the conflict." Furthermore, it stated:

In 1988, the Palestine Liberation Organization (PLO) declared the establishment of the State of Palestine over the territory occupied by Israel in 1967 ... By limiting our national aspirations to 22% of the Palestinian people's historic homeland, the PLO made a historic compromise in the interest of peace. Palestinian concessions over land have been painful but they have been honoured. Since the signing of the Oslo Accords in 1993, the international community has repeatedly affirmed that the only formula for peace in the region is the two-state solution, which requires the establishment of a viable and sovereign Palestinian state. ... Now it is time for Israel and the international community to honour commitments made to us by recognising the State of Palestine on the remaining 22% of our patrimony and admitting Palestine to the UN as a full member.

Another factor that has led to the movement is the Arab Spring. Schleifer said of President Abbas, "He's very self-conscious I think of the overall atmosphere of change in the Arab world, which dramatises the lack of accomplishment in terms of achieving a Palestinian state through negotiations".

== Campaign ==
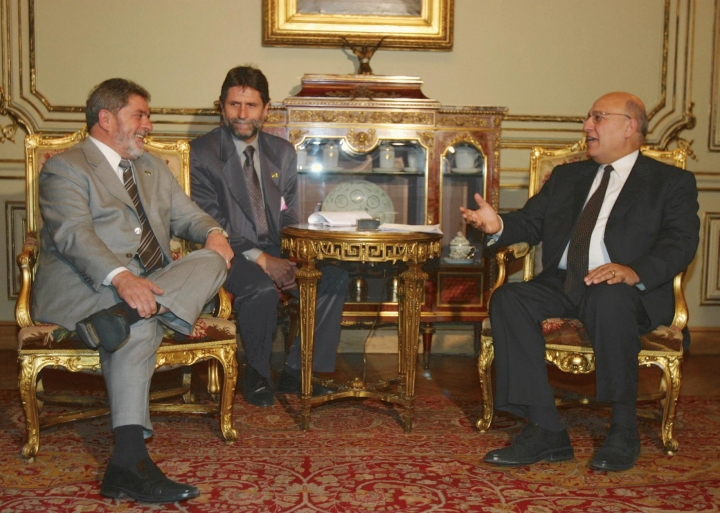
Chief negotiator Nabil Shaath speaks with President Lula da Silva of Brazil.

Diplomatic efforts to gain support for the bid gained momentum following a succession of endorsements from South America in early 2011. High-level delegations led by Mahmoud Abbas, Yasser Abed Rabbo, Riyad al-Maliki, Saeb Erekat, Nabil Shaath and Riyad Mansour paid visits to many states. Palestinian ambassadors, assisted by those of other Arab states, were charged with enlisting the support of the governments to which they were accredited. During the lead-up to the vote, Russia, Spain and China have publicly pledged support for the Palestinian bid, as have inter-governmental organisations such as the African Union, and the Non-Aligned Movement. Samir Awad, a professor of politics at Birzeit University in the West Bank, explaining the near-total stalling of the initiative seven months later, said Abbas failed to "follow through" as a result of US pressure: "He did not want to burn his bridges with the Americans."

=== Counter-measures ===
Israeli measures to counter the initiative also increased, and Germany, Italy, Canada and the U.S. announced publicly they would vote against the resolution. Israeli and U.S. diplomats began a campaign pressuring many countries to oppose or abstain from the vote. However, because of the "automatic majority" enjoyed by the Palestinians in the General Assembly, the Netanyahu administration has stated that it does not expect to prevent a resolution from passing should it go ahead. In August, Haaretz quoted the Israeli ambassador to the United Nations, Ron Prosor, as stating that Israel stood no chance of altering the outcome of a resolution at the General Assembly by September. "The maximum that we can hope to gain is for a group of states who will abstain or be absent during the vote", wrote Prosor. "Only a few countries will vote against the Palestinian initiative."

Instead, the Israeli government has focused on obtaining a "moral majority" of major democratic powers, in an attempt to diminish the weight of the vote. Considerable weight has been placed on the position of the European Union, which has not yet been announced. EU foreign policy chief Catherine Ashton has stated that it is likely to depend on the wording of the resolution. At the end of August, Israel's defence minister Ehud Barak told Ashton that Israel was seeking to influence the wording: "It is very important that all the players come up with a text that will emphasise the quick return to negotiations, without an effort to impose pre-conditions on the sides."

Efforts from both Israel and the U.S. have also focused on pressuring the Palestinian leadership to abandon its plans and return to negotiations. In the U.S., Congress passed a bill denouncing the initiative and calling on the Obama administration to veto any resolution that would recognise a Palestinian state declared outside of an agreement negotiated by the two parties. A similar bill was passed in the Senate, which also threatened a withdrawal of aid to the West Bank. In late August, another congressional bill was introduced which proposes to block U.S. government funding for any United Nations entity that supports giving Palestine an elevated status. Several top U.S. officials, including ambassador to the United Nations Susan Rice and consul-general in Jerusalem Daniel Rubinstein, made similar threats. In the same month, it was reported that the Israeli Ministry of Finance was withholding its monthly payments to the PNA. Foreign Minister Avigdor Lieberman warned that if the Palestinians made a unilateral approach to the United Nations, they would be in violation of the Oslo Accords, and Israel would no longer consider itself bound by them. He also recommended cutting all ties with the PNA.

== Applications ==
On 16 September 2011, President Abbas announced that an application would be made for the admission to full membership to the United Nations for the State of Palestine, ending speculation about which route the government would take. Abbas submitted the application to Secretary-General Ban Ki-moon on 23 September, immediately prior to delivering his address to the General Assembly. The territorial basis referred to were the 4 June 1967 borders, with al-Quds al-Sharif (East Jerusalem) as its capital. The application stated that it was being submitted in line with "the Palestinian people's natural, legal and historic rights", citing the 1947 partition plan as well as the 1988 declaration of independence and its subsequent acknowledgement by General Assembly Resolution 43/177 of 15 December 1988. It also reaffirmed the state's commitment to the achievement of a "just, lasting and comprehensive resolution" to the conflict "based on the vision of two states living side by side in peace and security". The application was referred to the Security Council's committee on membership on 28 September.

In order for a state to gain membership in the General Assembly, its application must have the support of two-thirds of member states with a prior recommendation for admission from the Security Council. This requires, in particular, at least 9 in favour and the absence of a veto from any of the council's five permanent members. At the prospect of a veto from the United States, Palestinian leaders signalled they might opt instead for a more limited upgrade to "non-member state" status, which, in contrast to full membership, requires a simple majority in the General Assembly. This was pushed as a compromise option by several European members. Another potential course of action that al-Malki announced was to overrule the veto through the Uniting for Peace emergency procedure, which requires a two-thirds majority of the General Assembly.

On 11 November a report was approved by the Security Council which concluded that the council had been unable "to make a unanimous recommendation" on membership for Palestine. Diplomats suggested that a formal vote on membership by the council, which only takes place if called for by one of its members, depends on whether one is pushed for by Palestine. It was doubted that such a vote, if called, would receive the requisite 9 favourable votes due to numerous expected abstentions, thus negating the possibility of an American veto.

By late 2012, the Palestinians had decided to suspend their application for full membership in favour of seeking an upgrade in status to "non-member observer state". However, their membership application was not abandoned and the UNGA resolution upgrading their status passed in November 2012 "expresses the hope that the Security Council will consider favourably the application submitted on 23 September 2011 by the State of Palestine for admission to full membership in the United Nations".

=== UNESCO ===
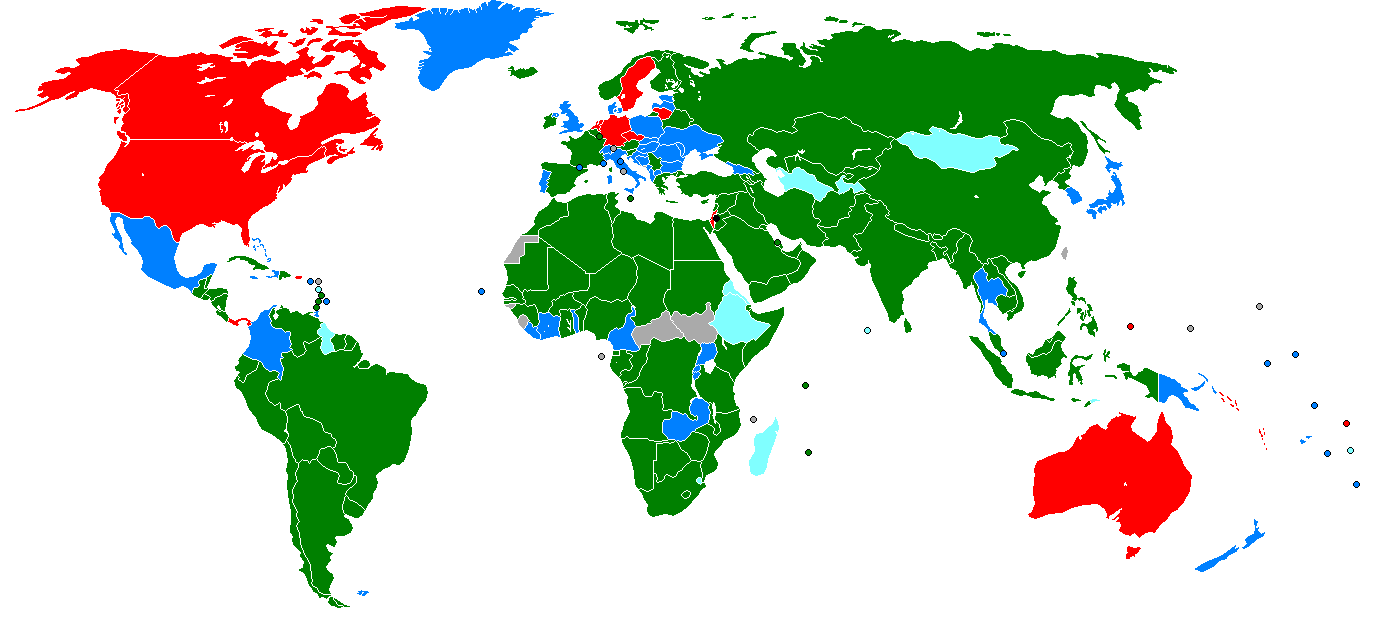
UNESCO membership voting results: In favour Against Abstentions Absent Non-members/ineligible

The PLO was accorded observer status at UNESCO in 1974. In 1989, an application for the admission of the State of Palestine as a member state was submitted by a group of seven states during the 131st session of UNESCO's executive board. The board postponed a decision until the next session, and the item was included on each session's agenda thereafter, being repeatedly deferred. During the board's 187th session in September 2011, a draft resolution was presented by 24 states requesting that the application be considered and the State of Palestine be granted membership in the organisation. Following consultations between the representatives of the 58-member board, the draft resolution was put for voting on 5 October. The board voted in favour of recommending the application, winning the approval of 40 states. The resolution to admit Palestine as the agency's 195th member state was adopted at the 36th General Conference on 31 October. Of the 185 dues-paying members eligible for voting, 107 were in favour, 14 were against, 52 abstained and 12 were absent. The resolution was submitted by a total of 43 states. Its membership was ratified on 23 November.

As a result of the vote, Israel released a statement rejecting the decision of the general conference and warning that it would be reconsidering its future co-operation with the agency, calling the vote a "tragedy". The Israeli government accelerated the building of settlements within the West Bank, including East Jerusalem while withholding payments of US$100 million per month to the PNA. Israeli foreign ministry spokesman Yigal Palmor stated these measures were an attempt to increase pressure on Palestinians, while Abbas noted it would further disrupt the peace process. Netanyahu said that the settlement construction was not punishment, but a "basic right of [the Israeli] people". This Israeli move was criticised by the UN, the US, the EU, and the EU three. The USA announced it was cutting off funding for UNESCO, citing the pre-existing laws which were put in place after Palestine first applied for UNESCO and WHO membership in April 1989 that prohibit funding any UN agency or affiliate that grants full membership to non-states as justification.. A spokeswoman for the government said it would withhold a US$60 million payment it was scheduled to make in November. Canada has also withheld funding. The resolution also highlighted the divergence in foreign policies within the European Union.

=== UN observer state ===
UN observer state status voting results: In favour Against Abstentions Absent Non-members

By September 2012, with their application for full membership stalled, Palestine had decided to pursue an upgrade in status from "observer entity" to "non-member observer state", similar to that of the Holy See. On 27 November it was announced that the appeal had been officially made, and would be put to a vote in the General Assembly on 29 November, where their status upgrade was expected to be supported by a majority of states. In addition to granting Palestine "non-member observer State status", the resolution "expresses the hope that the Security Council will consider favourably the application submitted on 23 September 2011 by the State of Palestine for admission to full membership in the United Nations", endorses the two state solution based on the pre-1967 borders, and stresses the need for an immediate resumption of negotiations between the two parties. The General Assembly passed the resolution with 138 nations in favour, 9 against and 41 abstaining.

The change in status was described by The Independent as "de facto recognition of the sovereign state of Palestine".

The vote was a historic benchmark for the sovereign State of Palestine and its citizens, whilst it was a diplomatic setback for Israel and the United States. Status as an observer state in the UN allows the State of Palestine to participate in general debate at the General Assembly, to co-sponsor resolutions, to join treaties and specialised UN agencies, such as the International Civil Aviation Organisation, the Law of the Seas Treaty and the International Criminal Court. It shall permit Palestine to claim legal rights over its territorial waters and air space as a sovereign state recognised by the UN. It shall also provide the Palestinian state with the right to sue for control of the territory that rightfully belongs to its citizens in the International Court of Justice and with the legal right to bring war-crimes charges, mainly those relating to Israel's unlawful occupation of the State of Palestine, against Israel in the International Criminal Court.

The UN has, after the resolution was passed, permitted Palestine to title its representative office to the UN as "The Permanent Observer Mission of the State of Palestine to the United Nations". Palestine has started to re-title its name accordingly on postal stamps, official documents and passports, whilst it has instructed its diplomats to officially represent 'The State of Palestine', as opposed to the 'Palestine National Authority'. As a result, in the change in status, the United Nations Secretariat recognized Palestine's right to become a party to treaties for which the UN Secretary-General is the depositary. Additionally, on 17 December 2012, UN Chief of Protocol Yeocheol Yoon decided that "the designation of 'State of Palestine' shall be used by the Secretariat in all official United Nations documents".

=== Other agencies and treaties ===
On 31 October 2011, following the admission of Palestine to UNESCO, the Minister of Health Fathi Abu Moghli announced that the PLO would also seek membership at the World Health Organization. The PLO had applied for WHO membership for the State of Palestine in 1989, but the United States, which provided one-quarter of the WHO's funding at the time, informed the organization that its funding would be withheld if Palestine was admitted as a member state. The WHO subsequently voted to postpone consideration of the application and no decision on the application has yet been made. Following protests by the UN Secretary-General, al-Malki announced on 3 November that at this point the PLO would not seek membership in other UN agencies until the issue of membership has been resolved by the Security Council.

Following their 2012 observer state status upgrade at the UNGA, Palestinian authorities again discussed the possibility of joining UN agencies and organizations and other international bodies as well as acceding to international treaties. In April 2014, the PLO submitted instruments of accession to 15 multilateral treaties, including all four Geneva Conventions, three of the Vienna Conventions and one of the Hague Conventions of 1899 and 1907. On 27 April 2014, the PLO Central Committee decided to accede to an additional 48 international treaties and organizations including the International Criminal Court, United Nations Convention on the Law of the Sea, International Monetary Fund, World Bank, World Trade Organization, Interpol, International Atomic Energy Agency and Organisation for the Prohibition of Chemical Weapons. On 31 December 2014, after a resolution setting a deadline for Israel to end their occupation of Palestinian territory was rejected by the UN Security Council, Palestine's President Mahmoud Abbas signed documents to accede to 20 treaties, including the Rome Statute of the International Criminal Court, Protocol II and Protocol III to the Geneva Conventions, the Treaty on the Non-Proliferation of Nuclear Weapons and the United Nations Convention on the Law of the Sea.

=== Renewed membership efforts and additional rights at the UN ===
The effort to secure full UN membership was renewed in 2024 during the Gaza war, with the United Nations Security Council holding a vote on the topic in April. While the vote was 12 in favor, two abstentions, and one vote against, the United States vetoed the measure so it did not pass.

On 10 May 2024, the UN General Assembly passed a resolution that recognized that Palestine met the requirements for UN membership, and requested that the Security Council reconsider admitting the state. It also granted Palestine additional rights at the UN, including being seated with member states, the right to introduce proposals and agenda items, and participate in committees, but did not grant them the right to vote. The vote was 143 countries in favour, nine against and 25 abstaining. The upgrades went into effect at the 79th session of the UN General Assembly on 10 September 2024.

== Responses ==
=== Public ===
The months coming up to the application's submission saw the emergence of several public support groups and an increasing level of support in grass-roots activist initiatives. A group of artists from Jenin were commissioned to craft an olive-wood blue chair symbolising the campaign and take it on an international tour of the Middle East and Europe en route to the United Nations headquarters in New York. The chair was embroidered with the UN logo and the words "Palestine's Right: A full membership in the United Nations". Online amnesty group Avaaz launched an e-petition on its website urging all United Nations members to endorse the bid to admit Palestine; it reportedly attained 500,000 signatures in its first four days. OneVoice Palestine launched a domestic campaign in partnership with local news agencies, with the aim of getting the involvement and support of Palestinian citizens. Overseas, campaigns were launched in several nations, calling on their governments to vote "yes" in the resolution.

On 7 September, a group of activists under the banner "Palestine: State No. 194" staged a demonstration outside the United Nations' office in Ramallah. During this they submitted to the office a letter addressed to Secretary-General Ban Ki-moon, urging him to "exert all possible efforts toward the achievement of the Palestinian people's just demands". The following day, Ban told reporters: "I support ... the statehood of Palestinians; an independent, sovereign state of Palestine. It has been long overdue", but that "recognition of a state is something to be determined by the member states."

In the West Bank, support groups called on Palestinians to actively campaign for the bid, and planned a series of co-ordinated demonstrations to take place in cities between 19 and 23 September. Massive demonstrations were staged in several cities in the West Bank in support of the bid, including Ramallah and Hebron. A women's rally was also staged by Palestinians and Israelis at the Qalandia checkpoint between Ramallah and Jerusalem. As the president spoke to the General Assembly on 23 September, thousands of people gathered in central Ramallah with lit candles and portraits of Abu Mazen. When the president finished speaking, the demonstrators chanted Palestinian protest chants. The organisers emphasised their intention to keep the rallies strictly peaceful, and reports indicated that this was mostly the case. However, several violent clashes occurred between demonstrators and the Israeli army at Qalandia, in which one Palestinian man was killed. In addition, violence between Israeli settlers and local Palestinians escalated to a peak.

In Gaza, all demonstrations in support or condemnation of the application were banned in an attempt to avoid any action with the potential to deepen the divisions between Palestinian factions. A survey by a Palestinian research center found that 86 percent of Gaza residents favour the push for membership, more than in the West Bank.

Overseas, rallies in support of the bid were staged in Berlin, Buenos Aires, Bucharest, Caracas, Copenhagen, London, Prague, Sacramento, Sofia and Stockholm. Demonstrators in Amman expressed opposition to the proposal, calling instead for a state on the entirety of the historical Palestinian land. Rallies were staged in New York on the days leading up to the summit, and continued outside the United Nations headquarters building throughout the duration of the session.

=== Opposition parties ===
The Popular Front for the Liberation of Palestine (PFLP) backed the bid in early September. A spokesman for the organisation said, "We support the Palestinian leadership's plan to go to the UN because that is a natural right of the Palestinians and part of the political battle against Israeli occupation." The chairman of the Palestinian National Initiative (PNI), Mustafa Barghouti, endorsed the plan as "the last option for two states". He argued, "The time has come for an alternative. There is no space or place for talks", adding that the campaign was "an outcry toward the international community for a two-state solution." The Democratic Front for the Liberation of Palestine (DFLP) backed the plan as early as July, organising a supportive rally at the UN headquarters in Gaza. A spokesman encouraged the public to support the campaign, and said that it would put pressure on Israel and the international community to uphold their responsibilities. These sentiments were echoed by the Popular Struggle Front (PSF). The Palestinian Democratic Union (FIDA) also organised rallies in support of the bid in the West Bank during September.

Meanwhile, despite the agreement to form a unity government in April, Hamas was strongly critical of the campaign. Officials labelled it as a purely symbolic move that would not lead to any results; spokesman Sami Abu Zuhri said, "Even if this move is carried out, it will not oblige the occupation to withdraw one step from the land of Palestine." He also accused Fatah of acting unilaterally, stating that the proposal did not take Hamas' concerns into consideration.

Days before the application was submitted to the Security Council, Prime Minister Ismail Haniyeh outwardly rejected the terms of the proposal but emphasised that Hamas would not stand in the way of the establishment of a Palestinian state. He refused to concede anything that would legitimise Israel: "There is no mandate for any Palestinian leadership to infringe on Palestinian national rights, nor is there a mandate for any Palestinian actor to make historic concessions on Palestinian land or the right of the Palestinians, foremost among them the right of return." He added, "We are with the establishment of a Palestinian state on any liberated part of Palestinian land that is agreed upon by the Palestinian people, without recognising Israel or conceding any inch of historical Palestine."

Though some Hamas officials reportedly suggested they would support a peace deal based on the 1967 lines, Haniyeh and many others remained vehemently opposed. "The Palestinian people do not beg the world for a state, and the state can't be created through decisions and initiatives", Haniyeh said. "States liberate their land first and then the political body can be established." Senior official Khalil al-Hayya requested that the legislative council approach the United Nations for recognition of a Palestinian state on all of historical Palestine, and appealed to the United Nations to invalidate Israel.

=== Israel ===
The Israeli government opposes the Palestinian move at the United Nations and claims that only through bilateral negotiations without preconditions could a Palestinian state be established although Palestinian representatives would need to recognise in advance Israel's claim to statehood and renounce violence.

=== International ===
Legend – Recognition
Y	Yes
N	No

Legend – UN votes
F	For
A	Against
ABST	Abstained
NP	Not present for vote
IE	Ineligible to vote
NM	Non member

State	Recogn.	UNESCO membership vote	UN observer state vote	Further details
Afghanistan	Y	F	F	In his speech to the General Assembly, Foreign Minister Zalmai Rassoul stood firmly behind Palestinian efforts aimed at full membership. He stated: "We reiterate our call for an immediate end to their suffering and the realisation of their inalienable rights, including the right to an independent State. In this connection, we stand firmly behind efforts aimed at Palestine's admission as a full member of the United Nations. I hope that this year we will witness, with pride, the inclusion of Palestine as the 194th member of the United Nations."
Albania	Y	ABST	ABST	In his address to the General Assembly, Prime Minister Sali Berisha stated: "My government fully supports the idea of an independent Palestine, but I do believe that unilateral action will not be helpful. That is why I call on our Palestinian friends to support the yesterday's Quartet statement in which they draw a clear roadmap of actions to address this fundamental question of our time." It was not made clear whether Albania would support an upgrade in observer status.
Algeria	Y	F	F	In his address to the General Assembly, Foreign Minister Mourad Medelci said that Palestine's application for statehood was an opportunity to impose international law. He stated: "The initiative of the Palestinian Authority to demand during this session, the recognition of Palestine as a member state of the United Nations represents an opportunity for the UN to correct, ever so slightly, an injustice that has lasted over 60 years. Such admission represents a clear and unequivocal response from the international community regarding its determination to impose international law."
Andorra	N	ABST	ABST	In his address to the General Assembly, Foreign Minister Gilbert Saboya Sunyé implored the international community to continue to encourage dialogue and mediation, pointing out that both sides' wishes are equally legitimate. He said, "The final aim of a mutual recognition of two States by both peoples, in accordance with 1967 lines with agreed and equivalent exchanges is at stake. A possible intermediate status in a shorter term by becoming an observer State could represent hope for the Palestinian people, provided this status is not used for aims incompatible with the continuity of negotiations and will lead to the above mentioned long term goal."
Angola	Y	F	F	Speaking to reporters in New York on 20 September, Foreign Minister Georges Chicoti said that Angola supports the admission of the Palestinian state to the United Nations.
Antigua and Barbuda	Y	IE	F	Prime Minister Baldwin Spencer formally recognised the State of Palestine during the General Assembly session in September. The statement was circulated to representatives in attendance. In his address, Spencer stated: "We decided to join with others who have already done so and grant recognition to the State of Palestine. As we did then and we do now, we believe that recognition of the State of Palestine will contribute to the quest for a negotiated solution to the Israeli-Palestinian conflict, the creation of lasting peace and stability in the region, and ultimately result in a viable Palestine, and a secure Israel."
Argentina	Y	F	F	In her address to the General Assembly on 21 September, Cristina Fernández gave her support for the application.
Armenia	Y	F	F	
Australia	Y	A	ABST	When Palestine applied for membership in 2011, then Foreign Minister Kevin Rudd advised Prime Minister Julia Gillard to abstain, but Gillard insisted that she would vote against it. She overruled Rudd again to oppose the Palestinian application at UNESCO. When it came to the application for an upgrade to "observer state" in 2012, Gillard took the same stance, despite many in the Labor Party arguing against it. At a Cabinet meeting on 26 November, Foreign Minister Bob Carr and at least nine other ministers warned Gillard that she risked losing her position as leader of the party if Australia voted against Palestine. An agreement was reached to abstain from the vote.
Austria	N	F	F	In his address to the General Assembly, Foreign Minister Michael Spindelegger rejected unilateral actions, saying: "We have no choice but to return to direct negotiations between the two parties. The Quartet in its statement of yesterday has shown a way how to do this and has also proposed concrete timelines. Austria fully supports the Quartet statement. There is no time to lose." He did not make clear whether Austria would support an upgrade in observer status. It was announced on 27 November 2012 that Austria would vote in favour of the upgrade.
Azerbaijan	Y	F	F	In his speech to the General Assembly, Foreign Minister Elmar Mammadyarov said: "Azerbaijan reaffirms its adherence to the position expressed by the majority of the United Nations Member States. We reiterate our long-standing solidarity with the people and leadership of Palestine and believe that the time has come to reach a breakthrough on this long-standing and very important issue. The time has come for Palestine to be fully represented at the United Nations."
Bahamas	Y	ABST	ABST	
Bahrain	Y	F	F	In his speech to the General Assembly on 22 September, King Hamad bin Isa Al Khalifa called on the United Nations to recognise Palestine as a member state: "Today, more than any time before, the international community has an opportunity to do justice to the brotherly Palestinian people and to assist it to achieve its legitimate aspirations by recognising its independent Palestinian state on their own national territory, with East Jerusalem as its capital."
Bangladesh	Y	F	F	During a press conference in New York, Prime Minister Sheikh Hasina said that "Bangladesh is always beside Palestine. We've always supported Palestine and we will." She added, "If there's a vote, Bangladesh will vote for Palestine."
Barbados	Y	ABST	ABST	
Belarus	Y	F	F	
Belgium	N	F	F	It was reported in November 2012 that Belgium would abstain from the vote on Palestine's upgraded status at the UN.
Belize	Y	F	F	
Benin	Y	F	F	
Bhutan	Y	F	F	
Bolivia, Plurinational State of	Y	F	F	In his address to the General Assembly, President Evo Morales stated: "Of course we give our full support. I want to say that Bolivia not only supports the recognition of Palestine to the United Nations, but our position is more like Bolivia welcomes Palestine to United Nations."
Bosnia and Herzegovina	Y	ABST	ABST	In October 2011, Israeli Foreign Minister Avigdor Lieberman stated that Bosnian officials had informed him that they would not vote in favour of Palestine membership in the UN.
Botswana	Y	F	F	
Brazil	Y	F	F	Brazil has firmly stressed its support for a Palestinian state within the borders of 1967, with Jerusalem as its capital. In her address to the General Assembly, President Dilma Rousseff reiterated her country's firm support: "We believe the time has come for us to have Palestine fully represented as a full member in this forum." Brazil has announced it will support Palestine's full membership application when it comes to a vote at the Security Council.
Brunei	Y	F	F	
Bulgaria	Y	ABST	ABST	
Burkina Faso	Y	F	F	In his speech to the General Assembly, Foreign Minister Djibrill Ypènè Bassolé stated: "We support the application for membership of Palestine to the United Nations as a member state and reiterate our call for the establishment of lasting and comprehensive peace in this region."
Burundi	Y	ABST	F	
Cabo Verde	Y	ABST	F	
Cambodia	Y	F	F	In his speech, Foreign Minister Hor Namhong said: "Cambodia has always supported the creation of a Palestine state on the basis of its 1967 borders. With this in mind, Cambodia supports during this General Assembly the rights of Palestine to become a full member of the UN."
Cameroon	N	ABST	ABST	
Canada	Y	A	A	In July 2011, the spokesman for Foreign Minister John Baird stated, "Our government's long-standing position has not changed. The only solution to this conflict is one negotiated between and agreed to by the two parties. ... One of the states must be a Jewish state and recognised as such, while the Palestinian state is to be a non-militarised one". In his speech to the General Assembly in September, Baird confirmed that Canada would not support the application, and labelled the endeavours as "unilateral actions".
Central African Republic	Y	IE	F	
Chad	Y	F	F	In his address to the General Assembly, President Idriss Déby stated: "I say it frankly, the time has come to recognise a State of Palestine alongside the State of Israel. We must have the courage to take this step, which is essential for the advancement of peace between the Israeli and Palestinian peoples."
Chile	Y	F	F	In his address to the General Assembly, President Sebastián Piñera said: "With regard to the promotion of world peace, we have recognised the Palestinian State and hope very soon to welcome it to this Organisation, and we have resolutely supported all the international efforts to achieve a just and lasting peace in the Middle East that will allow Palestinians to have a free, sovereign and democratic State and Israel to have frontiers that are recognised, secure and respected."
China	Y	F	F	In his address to the General Assembly, Foreign Affairs Minister Yang Jiechi said: "China consistently supports the just cause of establishing an independent Palestinian state and supports Palestine's membership in the United Nations." China had previously pledged support for the application in August.
Colombia	Y	ABST	ABST	President Juan Manuel Santos has said that he does not believe a bid for United Nations membership is the appropriate method to gain independence, and maintains that this can only be achieved through direct negotiations with Israel. The government has stated that it will likely abstain from a Security Council vote on the application, but has not indicated its stance on an upgrade in observer status. On 3 August 2018 President Juan Manuel Santos declared Palestine as a free and independent nation.
Comoros	Y	IE	F	President Ikililou Dhoinine said his country supported the membership request and called for the support of other member states. "The Comoros have always supported the struggle of the fraternal Palestinian people. They support the demand of the Palestinian Authority addressed to the international community for recognition of a Palestinian state in its June 1967 borders, with East Jerusalem as capital. ... My country, as it is concerned, is in line with this recognition and appeal to all peace-loving country, free and just, to do the same."
Congo	Y	F	F	Foreign Minister Basile Ikouébé did not specifically mention the Palestinian application in his speech, but reiterated his government's support for a Palestinian state: "It's time to do justice to the legitimate aspirations of the Palestinian people."
Cook Islands	N	ABST	NM	
Costa Rica	Y	F	F	Prior to the application's submission, the Foreign Ministry stated that Costa Rica would support Palestine's admission, provided it does not compromise the right to existence and security of Israel.
Côte d'Ivoire	Y	ABST	F	
Croatia	N	ABST	ABST	
Cuba	Y	F	F	In his speech, Foreign Minister Bruno Rodríguez Parrilla said that the "General Assembly has the inescapable moral, political and legal obligation to ensure the recognition of an independent Palestinian State, with the boundaries established before 1967 and with East Jerusalem as its capital, as a full member of the United Nations Organisation."
Cyprus	Y	F	F	Cyprus recognised the 1967 lines as the borders of the State of Palestine in January. In June, it was reported that Interior Minister Neoclis Sylikiotis had offered to rally support in Europe for the Palestinian bid for United Nations recognition. In September, Foreign Minister Erato Kozakou-Marcoullis said that Cyprus would follow any common position developed by the EU. According to one diplomat, "As far as Cyprus is concerned, the most comfortable situation is where the EU votes as a whole and they're a part of it, sheltered in the team." Failing a united position, the Cypriot government has not indicated how it will vote, and diplomats have speculated that it would likely abstain: "It would be very uncomfortable for Cyprus to go against Israel or the Palestinians." It was reported in November 2012 that Cyprus would support Palestine's UN status upgrade.
Czech Republic	Y	A	A	In a visit to Jerusalem in mid-September, Prime Minister Petr Nečas publicly stated that his government would back Israel, saying "We are convinced that any unilateral steps will only harm the peace process." In his speech to the General Assembly, President Václav Klaus stated: "... there is no shortcut to the end of a conflict that has endured for decades. It requires both sides to take an innovative approach and overcome some old inflexible and rigid schemes of thought. It requires both sides to negotiate and to find a balanced solution which would last. Such solution cannot come through unilateral steps, neither those forced by the UN, nor the steps taken by one side of the dispute only."
North Korea	Y	F	F	North Korea's permanent representative to the United Nations, Pak Kil-yon, called it "an obligation" of the international community to admit Palestine as a member state. "The DPRK, which recognised Palestine state in 1988, supports its UN admission and expresses its conviction that the aspirations of the Palestine people will be translated into a reality."
Democratic Republic of the Congo	Y	F	ABST	
Denmark	N	ABST	F	
Djibouti	Y	F	F	President Ismaïl Omar Guelleh expressed his solidarity with the Palestinian people's continued struggle under occupation and urged countries to give them hope by recognising them as a member of the organisation. "The time has come for us to give hope to our Palestinian brothers and sisters by giving them the right to become a full-fledged state. ... History will remember, I hope, that today we have chosen to end injustice. The choice to finally give to Palestine a full place in the international community. History will remember especially that we have chosen not to disappoint the hopes of the people of Palestine."
Dominica	Y	NP	F	Prime Minister Roosevelt Skerrit is regarded by political analysts as a close ally of Venezuela's Hugo Chávez—himself a staunch supporter of Palestine. It was speculated in the media that Skerrit would likely vote for Palestine in any resolution. Dominica is one of eight members of the Bolivarian Alliance, which issued a statement on 9 September 2011 expressing full support for the recognition of the State of Palestine by the United Nations. During the assembly in September, the foreign minister of Guyana implied that Dominica would support the bid, saying that it had possibly already recognised the State of Palestine. However, nothing has been publicly confirmed by the government.
Dominican Republic	Y	F	F	In October, President Leonel Fernández formally pledged his country's support for the Palestinian application during a meeting with President Abbas in Santo Domingo. He said that recognising the statehood of Palestine would help bring about sustainable peace in the Middle East and ease concerns in the entire Arab community.
Ecuador	Y	F	F	In his speech to the General Assembly, Ecuador's permanent representative to the United Nations, Francisco Carrión-Mena, said: "Ecuador, qualifying as an act of historical justice, recognised on 24 December 2010 Palestine as a free and independent state in its 1967 borders with East Jerusalem as its capital. Therefore, my country gave its unqualified support for the application for recognition of the State of Palestine as a member of the United Nations, formally requested by the Palestinian president, as well as all other initiatives aimed at consolidating a lasting peace, which will not only benefit the peoples of Palestine and Israel, but throughout the region."
Egypt	Y	F	F	Speaking on behalf of the Non-Aligned Movement as well as Egypt, Foreign Minister Kemal Ali Amer reiterated "the Movement's support to the efforts exerted towards declaring the establishment of the independent State of Palestine with East Jerusalem as its capital and its admission as a full member of the United Nations." The minister added, "I also must call upon the countries that have not yet recognised the State of Palestine to do so as a contribution to the efforts aimed at achieving a just, lasting and comprehensive settlement of the conflict in the Middle East, based on the two states solution."
El Salvador	Y	F	F	President Mauricio Funes stated in his address that, "Recognising Palestine as a new State in the United Nations is, in my opinion, the right way to contribute to resolving this conflict."
Equatorial Guinea	Y	F	NP	
Eritrea	N	NP	F	President Isaias Afewerki reaffirmed his nation's support for the right of Palestinians to self-determination and an independent, sovereign state, but emphasised that the Palestinian drive for United Nations membership should not become a symbolic battle bereft of substance, recalling that the Oslo Accords had led neither to Palestinian statehood, nor to peace between the two sides.
Estonia	N	ABST	ABST	On 20 September, Foreign Minister Urmas Paet declared that Estonia does not support the request for membership. Paet said unilateral developments would only complicate the peace process: "Nor will unilateral steps contribute to the recommencement of peace talks between Israel and Palestine, regional stability or, ultimately, the creation of a vital Palestinian state. Thus they cannot be supported." In November 2012 Estonian Foreign Minister Urmas Paet stated that Estonia would abstain from the vote on an upgrade to Palestine's status at the UN.
Ethiopia	Y	NP	F	
Fiji	N	ABST	ABST	
Finland	N	F	F	Outgoing foreign minister Alexander Stubb reportedly expressed his government's support for the campaign in April. In October, Finland accorded diplomatic status to the PLO representative in Helsinki. Foreign Minister Erkki Tuomioja spoke of the growing frustration amongst Palestinians about the promise of a two-state solution. President Tarja Halonen said that Finland might recognise the Palestinian state, and expressed hope for more support for the idea within the European Union.
France	Y	F	F	President Nicolas Sarkozy claimed that while membership may be premature right now, allowing Palestine to upgrade their status to "non-member observer state" would be "an important step forward". On 23 November 2012, speaking at a hearing in the French senate, Foreign Minister Laurent Fabius reminded that French President François Hollande promised during his election campaign to promote the issue of Palestinian statehood.
Gabon	Y	F	F	
Gambia	Y	F	F	In her address to the General Assembly, Vice President Isatou Njie-Saidy said: "The sad reality is that numerous United Nations resolutions continue to be flouted by Israel. The daily killing, collective punishment and humiliation of Palestinians are going on unabated. Denial of humanitarian assistance, essential medical supplies and construction materials to Palestinians has become the norm. To this end, my delegation not only supports but recognizes an independent and sovereign Palestinian State within the confines of the 1967 borders. An independent Palestinian state with full rights and privileges like any other is long overdue. This is the only guarantor of lasting peace in that region."
Georgia	Y	ABST	F	President Mikheil Saakashvili said that although Palestine had the right to statehood, it should be resolved through negotiations. "We believe in negotiations and the position is very clear: this kind of things can only be settled when it takes two to do things. I hope there will be more and more incentives ... to get to some negotiated solution, because things should change for the people in reality not just on papers."
Germany	N	A	ABST	In April 2011, Chancellor Angela Merkel labelled the Palestinian bid for admission a "unilateral step", and stated unequivocally that Germany will not recognise a Palestinian state without its prior acceptance by Israel. "Unilateral recognitions therefore definitely do not contribute to achieving this aim ... This is our stance now and it will be our stance in September. There needs to be mutual recognition, otherwise it is not a two-state solution". In his speech to the General Assembly in September, Foreign Minister Guido Westerwelle reiterated Germany's position that statehood "can only be achieved through negotiations". Germany reportedly accepted admitting the State of Palestine as an observer, a compromise decision proposed in order to find a common EU position.
Ghana	Y	F	F	In August, Vice President John Dramani Mahama said that Ghana would support Palestine's request at the United Nations. In his address to the General Assembly in September, however, President John Atta Mills did not mention the matter, and has not publicly confirmed Ghana's position.
Greece	N	F	F	Foreign Minister Stavros Lambrinidis told the General Assembly that Greece fully supports the bid: "Greece supports unequivocally Palestine's right to statehood. It is now our responsibility, the responsibility of every member-state of the UN, to respect the Palestinian decision to request membership, and more importantly, to turn this into an opportunity that will jump-start anew direct negotiations."
Grenada	Y	F	F	In a letter sent to Abbas, Prime Minister Tillman Thomas assured the PLO of Grenada's full support, and noted that his government's stance was consistent with its approach to the idea of self-determination.
Guatemala	Y	F	ABST	
Guinea	Y	F	F	
Guinea-Bissau	Y	IE	F	In his speech to the General Assembly, Prime Minister Carlos Gomes Júnior said "In our diplomatic efforts, we have to also be consistent with our historic commitments, and above all, faithful to all who selflessly helped us in the struggle for the affirmation of our dignity. From this perspective, we welcome the decision of the Palestinian Authority to submit the request for recognition of the State of Palestine as a full member of the United Nations."
Guyana	Y	NP	F	President Bharrat Jagdeo said "Guyana supports the right of the Palestinian people to full statehood, and we urge the acceleration of the negotiations to achieve this." When asked whether Guyana would support the application, Foreign Minister Carolyn Rodrigues responded, "Of course Guyana will support the resolution. It is our moral obligation and we will not deviate from our long standing position." Jagdeo and his government reportedly lobbied intensively for Caribbean support for the bid.
Haiti	Y	ABST	ABST	
Honduras	Y	F	F	President Porfirio Lobo told the General Assembly, "My government has recognised Palestine as a state and identifies with their legitimate aspirations to become a full member in the community of nations. Full security for the State of Israel and total international recognition for Palestine are essential conditions for a negotiated and comprehensive solution that respects the formula of two states."
Hungary	Y	ABST	ABST	
Iceland	Y	F	F	Following a trip to Gaza in July 2011, Foreign Minister Össur Skarphéðinsson announced his country would support the resolution. "If it came to be at the United Nations General Assembly in September that a motion would be put forward by the nations supporting Palestinian independence and encouraging other nations to recognise Palestine as an independent nation with its 1967 borders, Iceland would support that. Likewise, if a proposition comes to the UN to include Palestine into the UN as a new nation ... Iceland would also support that." The minister reiterated his support in September. In his address to the General Assembly, Skarphéðinsson argued that by going to the United Nations, Palestine was doing the same as Israel did in 1947. He noted that Israel had taken its case to the United Nations and emerged with statehood, and claimed that Palestine deserved the same: "It is hypocrisy to suggest otherwise." He therefore confirmed that Iceland would vote "yes" when a resolution came to the General Assembly, and announced that his government would submit to the Althing a proposal for the recognition of the State of Palestine.
India	Y	F	F	In a letter sent to President Abbas dated 22 August, Prime Minister Manmohan Singh assured Palestine of India's full support in its endeavour: "India has been unwavering in its support of the cause of Palestinian peoples' struggle for sovereign, independent, viable and a United State of Palestine with east Jerusalem as its capital, living within secure and recognisable borders." The country's representative to the United Nations, Hardeep Singh Puri, reiterated, "Let me be absolutely clear and assure you of India's full support for Palestine at the UN." In his speech to the General Assembly, Manmohan Singh confirmed his country's support and added, "We look forward to welcoming Palestine as an equal member of the United Nations."
Indonesia	Y	F	F	Foreign Minister Marty Natalegawa announced that his country would support the application and lobbied other countries to do likewise: "We will seek any opportunity to ensure that Palestine's bid for UN membership, if that is what the Palestinians really want, gets international support."
Iran, Islamic Republic of	Y	F	F	Ayatollah Ali Khamenei has condemned the application, saying "Any plan that seeks to divide Palestine is totally rejected." He added, "It goes without saying that the Palestinian people, as they did in Gaza, will create a state on any liberated Palestinian land. But the ultimate goal is to liberate all of Palestine from the Mediterranean to the Dead Sea." Foreign Minister Ali Akbar Salehi stated that "Palestine is not divisible, and it cannot be divided into two parts as some are saying. Iran's official stance is that Palestine belongs to all Palestinians. Palestine belonged to Palestinians from the outset, and we do not approve of the breakup of Palestine." President Mahmoud Ahmadinejad said that recognition of a Palestinian state by the United Nations should only be a "step forward" towards "full liberation". He said the fate of Palestine should be determined in a referendum amongst indigenous Palestinians.
Iraq	Y	F	F	President Jalal Talabani supported international recognition for the State of Palestine. He said, "Iraq endorses and supports the direction of the Palestinian Authority to go to the United Nations to achieve full international recognition of a Palestinian state during the meeting of the current session of the General Assembly, and calls on the international community and all peace-loving forces to stand by the Palestinian people in their legitimate struggle to achieve its goals."
Ireland	Y	F	F	In his speech to the General Assembly, Foreign Minister Eamon Gilmore stated: "The decision of President Abbas to seek Palestine's membership of the United Nations is entirely legitimate and understandable. Palestine has the same right to membership of the United Nations as Ireland or any other Member of this Organisation." The minister admitted, however, that the admission of Palestine would not change the situation on the ground. "It does not remove the compelling need for negotiations. Nor will it offer a legitimate excuse to avoid negotiations. ... What recognition of Palestinian statehood would do, however, would be to give dignity and support to the Palestinian people who have suffered for too long. It would also be a tangible demonstration of the commitment of the international community and the UN to an agreed settlement between two sovereign states. ... The day will come, not too far off, when the General Assembly will be asked to vote on a proposal to admit Palestine as a member of this Organisation or perhaps, as an interim step towards the achievement of that goal, to accord Palestine non-member observer state status. Provided that the resolution is drafted in terms that are reasonable and balanced, I expect Ireland to give its full support."
Israel	N	A	A	See above
Italy	N	ABST	F	Prime Minister Silvio Berlusconi said in May 2011 that Italy would not recognise a unilateral declaration of Palestinian statehood. Berlusconi pledged his country's support for Israelis in "difficult situations". "Italy has always stood by Israel, even within the framework of the EU when it opposed decisions that were unbalanced and unjust towards Israel." In June, he reiterated: "We do not believe that a unilateral solution can help peace, neither on the Palestinian side nor on the Israeli side. I believe peace can only be reached with a common initiative through negotiations." Italy reportedly accepted the compromise pushed by the EU to admit Palestine as an observer state.
Jamaica	Y	ABST	F	Foreign Minister Kenneth Baugh spoke about an urgent resolution to the conflict, but did not mention Jamaica's position on the application: "Jamaica remains unwavering in its support for a just, lasting and comprehensive agreement that recognises the Palestinian State within the pre-1967 borders and guarantees the security of Israel. The focus now must be on ending the stalemate and reviving direct negotiations between Israel and Palestine. ... The door to peaceful negotiations will not be forever open; nor can there be a continuing delay to Palestine's assumption of its rightful place in the global community of states."
Japan	N	ABST	F	
Jordan	Y	F	F	Voicing support for the application in his address to the General Assembly, King Abdullah II said: "We will continue to strongly support the inalienable right of the Palestinian people to statehood in fulfillment of their aspirations and in accordance with UN resolutions, and within a comprehensive and just settlement and the resolution of all final status issues. It is their right to seek it here, in the house of nations, the United Nations. This we must all support."
Kazakhstan	Y	F	F	Kazakhstan, as president of the OIC for 2011, expressed its support for the Palestinian bid during a summit for the organisation held in Astana in June. In September, on the sidelines of the General Assembly, the ministers of the 57 OIC countries unanimously adopted a resolution in support of the bid. In his address, President Nursultan Nazarbayev said that the Palestinian state must be recognised for the sake of peace in the Middle East. "Kazakhstan supports the creation a Palestinian state", he said. "The Palestinian people who are as long-suffering as the people of Israel have been involved in negotiations for more than 50 years. It's impossible to achieve stable peace in the Middle East without an independent state of Palestine."
Kenya	Y	F	F	Addressing the General Assembly, President Mwai Kibaki said, "Kenya believes in the two-state solution where the territorial integrity of Palestine within the 1967 borders is upheld and the peace and security of Israel are both assured and guaranteed. It is therefore our hope that Palestine will be welcomed into the Community of Nations with full membership in the United Nations."
Kiribati	N	ABST	NP	
Kuwait	Y	F	F	Speaking to the General Assembly, Prime Minister Nasser Mohammed Al-Ahmed Al-Sabah said, "Here, we wish to renew our full commitment and support to the bid of the Palestinian Authority and its endeavours to obtain membership in the United Nations as an independent and full member state."
Kyrgyzstan	Y	F	F	President Roza Otunbayeva publicly gave support to Palestine's bid to be a member. In her address to the General Assembly, she said, "We have been waiting for too long to welcome Palestine as a full member of the United Nations! Kyrgyzstan as early as in 1995 recognised Palestine within the boundaries of the 1967, and we join the call of the UN Secretary-General for Israel and Palestine to return to the negotiating table."
Lao People's Democratic Republic	Y	F	F	In his speech to the General Assembly, Foreign Minister Thongloun Sisoulith stated unequivocally, "The Lao PDR supports Palestine's application on 23rd September 2011 for full membership of the UN."
Latvia	N	ABST	ABST	President Andris Bērziņš did not mention the application in his general address, but urged both sides to resume negotiations. Latvia was one of four states voting against Palestine's application to UNESCO. Its representative explained that Latvia believed the application to join the United Nations should be resolved first. "There is a logical sequence of events. ... We respect the application of Palestine for a full membership in the UN that subsequently would give Palestine the right to become a member of UNESCO. We believe this question should first be decided in New York, and the UN Security Council is examining it now."
Lebanon	Y	F	F	President Michel Sleiman, whose nation is presiding over the Security Council, supported the bid: "It is important to underscore the rightful Palestinian efforts aiming at earning the recognition of the state of Palestine and its full membership to the United Nations in line with the right of self-determination. Lebanon will back these efforts in order for the latter to succeed with the coordination and cooperation of brotherly and friendly countries."
Lesotho	Y	F	F	
Liberia	Y	ABST	NP	
Libya	Y	F	F	
Liechtenstein	N	NM	F	
Lithuania	N	A	ABST	On 28 November 2012, Lithuanian President Dalia Grybauskaitė said that Lithuania will abstain from the vote on an upgrade to Palestine's UN status due to the lack of a united stance in the European Union.
Luxembourg	Y	F	F	In response to divisions within the EU regarding the application, Foreign Minister Jean Asselborn reportedly urged the PLO to accept an upgrade in its observer status and not ask for membership. He insisted, "We cannot let the Palestinians leave New York at the end of the month with nothing", but that he "cannot agree to say no" to the Palestinians' request. He noted that securing the support of all EU nations "would be an enormous moral advantage" for Palestine. In his address Asselborn stated: "We have all heard the vibrant appeal by Palestinian President Mahmoud Abbas yesterday. An appeal for the recognition of the legitimate right of his people to a State, for acceptance of the aspirations of Palestine to have a seat in this Assembly and to fully assume its place among the Nations of the world. I can only hope that his appeal be heard."
Madagascar	Y	NP	NP	
Malawi	Y	F	ABST	
Malaysia	Y	F	F	Upon arrival in New York, Foreign Minister Dato' Sri Anifah Aman stated, "Malaysia has all along stood firm on the Palestine issue and its support for Palestine as a full member of the United Nations. ... If Palestine tables its application at this General Assembly, Malaysia will fully support it." He later confirmed this in his speech to the General Assembly: "We support the application of the Palestinians to the United Nations".
Maldives	Y	NP	F	Foreign Minister Ahmed Naseem expressed his country's support for the Palestinian request and called other nations to do the same: "When the Palestinians present their case to the UN, the Maldives will stand shoulder-to-shoulder with them, and we call on all others to do likewise." The minister added, "We do not accept that UN recognition of Palestinian statehood would harm the chances of a negotiated peace. We believe rather that it will help those chances by creating a situation in which two state partners can negotiate as equals." In his speech to the General Assembly, Vice-President Mohamed Waheed Hassan confirmed, "We believe that the time for Palestine to join the international family of nations is long overdue and welcome its application for statehood. The Maldives calls on all member states to support the recognition of a Palestinian state."
Mali	Y	F	F	In her address, Prime Minister Cissé Mariam Kaïdama Sidibé did not explicitly mention the application, but did express her country's support for the Palestinian cause: "While reiterating its active solidarity and full support to the Palestinian people in their just and legitimate struggle, Mali will continue to support all initiatives aimed at creating an independent Palestinian state."
Malta	Y	F	F	In early September, European diplomats reported that Malta was among several EU states supporting the Palestinians' request. This position was subsequently endorsed by opposition parties, but was not confirmed by the government, which refrained from discussing its voting intentions in compliance with the agreement between EU members made in hope of a common position emerging. This silence was criticised by shadow foreign minister George Vella, who said that a consensus was unlikely and argued that the government should publicly declare its support: "It's no secret that Malta has always been sympathetic to the Palestinian cause. Being declaredly in favour of this resolution does not mean ignoring or being anti- Israel." Foreign Minister Tonio Borg said that, if there was no European consensus once the matter had been brought to the General Assembly, Malta would vote in favour. In his address to the assembly, Prime Minister Lawrence Gonzi did not mention the application, but noted that, "from an institutional perspective, the preparations for statehood have been successfully completed." Borg also endorsed the compromise initiative proposed by France to give Palestine observer state status, saying that if this was the consensus amongst EU members, Malta would support it. It was reported in November 2012 that Malta would support Palestine's UN status upgrade.
Marshall Islands	N	IE	A	
Mauritania	Y	F	F	Foreign Minister Hamady Ould Hamady said his country supported the recovery of all the rights of the Palestinian people, and called for the recognition of Palestine as an independent state along the 1967 borders with full membership in the United Nations.
Mauritius	Y	F	F	In his speech to the General Assembly, Prime Minister Navin Ramgoolam said: "Mauritius supports the application for full membership of the United Nations, submitted to the· Secretary General yesterday by the President of the State of Palestine and the legitimate aspiration of the Palestinian people to take their rightful place in the international comity of nations."
Mexico	Y	ABST	F	
Micronesia, Federated States of	N	IE	A	President Emanuel Mori said, "We continue to support Israel's right to live within secure and recognised borders. ... We also acknowledge Palestine's right to statehood, which can only be achieved through negotiated settlement between the two parties." He echoed U.S. President Barack Obama's statement in saying, "there are no shortcuts to solving the problem."
Monaco	Y	ABST	ABST	
Mongolia	Y	NP	ABST	
Montenegro	Y	ABST	ABST	
Morocco	Y	F	F	Speaking to the General Assembly, Foreign Minister Taïb Fassi-Fihri stated: "It is time for the Organisation of the United Nations, through its various organs, and using all possible mechanisms, to fulfill its responsibilities to enable the Palestinian people, under the leadership of its national authority, to achieve all of its national legitimate rights." He concluded, "In this spirit, Morocco reiterates its support to the request by His Excellency President Mahmoud Abbas, on behalf of the Palestinian leadership, of their adhesion to the United Nations as a sovereign State on the basis of the 1967 borders with eastern Jerusalem as its Capital."
Mozambique	Y	F	F	President Armando Guebuza said, "We reiterate our unequivocal support to the cause of the Palestinian people, who have been denied the inalienable right to self-determination." He did not specifically mention the application, which had not yet been submitted at the time of his address.
Myanmar	N	F	F	
Namibia	Y	F	F	President Hifikepunye Pohamba said: "I reaffirm our full and unequivocal support for the legitimate struggle of the Palestinian people to achieve their inalienable right to self-determination and national independence. Namibia supports the admission of Palestine into the United Nations as a full member."
Nauru	N	ABST	A	
Nepal	Y	F	F	Prime Minister Baburam Bhattarai told reporters in New York that Nepal will support Palestine's bid for membership if there is a voting at the General Assembly. In his address, Bhattarai said, "It is our principled position that we support a fully independent and sovereign Palestine State based on the UN resolutions."
Netherlands	N	A	ABST	
New Zealand	N	ABST	F	
Nicaragua	Y	F	F	Foreign Minister Samuel Santos López stated in his address: "Before this General Assembly, Nicaragua ratifies its recoguition of the Palestinian State with its 1967 borders and East Jerusalem as its capital. We call for the proclamation, here and now, of Palestine as member State 194 of the UN."
Niger	Y	F	F	President Mahamadou Issoufou said: "The failure of [peace] negotiations has caused the Palestinian Authority to take measures for the recognition of the State of Palestine based on the 1967 borders on the one hand, and its admission as a full member of United Nations on the other. This is an opportunity for our organisation to take a bold decision to settle the Israeli–Palestinian conflict." He confirmed, "My country, one of the 122 UN member states that have already recognised the State of Palestine, is supporting the demand for statehood and full membership in the United Nations."
Nigeria	Y	F	F	
Niue	N	NP	NM	
Norway	Y	F	F	Prior to the gathering in New York, Foreign Minister Jonas Støre confirmed that Norway will support the Palestinians' request for full membership. At a meeting in New York, Støre reiterated that Norway's support would depend on the official proposal: "The Palestinians must be willing to start negotiations on final status issues. The text must recognise Israel's right to exist and not delegitimise the State of Israel, either directly or indirectly." In his speech to the General Assembly, Støre's deputy Espen Barth Eide said that these conditions had been met, and that Norway endorsed the application: "Both the Palestinian readiness for statehood and the declarations and commitments they have made should be acknowledged. Norway looks forward to welcoming Palestine as a full member of the United Nations."
Oman	Y	F	F	Foreign Minister Yusuf bin Alawi bin Abdullah, speaking to the General Assembly, said: "We believe that an establishment of Palestinian State on the borders of June 4, 1967 and the recognition of this State as a member of this organisation will certainly lead to serious negotiations and will reach a just, comprehensive and lasting solution of the Arab–Israeli conflict."
Pakistan	Y	F	F	In her address to the General Assembly, Foreign Minister Hina Rabbani Khar stated: "I would like to reaffirm our principled position. President Mahmoud Abbas made an historic and memorable case for his people. We stand by him and the Palestinian people. We stand by our brothers and sisters. And we agree: This really is not, sustainable, anymore. We support the quest of the State of Palestine for membership in the United Nations."
Palau	N	A	A	At the Pacific Islands Forum summit in early September 2011, the leader of the country's delegation expressed understanding for the suffering of the Palestinians and his desire to see a Palestinian state. He stressed, however, the importance of his country's relations with the U.S. and that his government would not interfere with its vital interests.
Panama	N	A	A	
Papua New Guinea	Y	ABST	ABST	
Paraguay	Y	F	ABST	President Fernando Lugo reiterated his government's support in his address to the General Assembly: "We welcome the inclusion in the agenda of this 66th Session, the recognition of the State of Palestine as free, sovereign and independent, and we believe that this represents the consecration of an historic debt of the international community towards the legitimate right of the Palestinian people to have their own state with its borders properly defined."
Peru	Y	F	F	During the General Assembly, Peruvian government officials said that their country endorses the Palestinians' application. In his speech, President Ollanta Humala expressed his support for the Palestinian people to live in peace and harmony as an independent state and United Nations member.
Philippines	Y	F	F	The Philippine ambassador to Palestine said "it's time for Palestine to fully exercise its rights and gain full membership in the United Nations", and said that the Philippines supports the establishing of a Palestinian state.
Poland	Y	ABST	ABST	
Portugal	Y	ABST	F	On the request for full membership for Palestine, Prime Minister Pedro Passos Coelho said that an agreement with Israel must be achieved first: "This step must be the result and logical outcome of negotiations. Therefore, we understand this request to be an expression of interest that will be fulfilled with the signing of a Peace Agreement." However, Coelho openly backed the call for an upgrade in Palestine's observer status: "Until then, we are open to support a strengthened status for Palestine in the United Nations. This would be an important step towards the creation of a new state. It would also represent an additional commitment by the Palestinians to the negotiation process, reinforcing the confidence needed to reach a definitive and global Peace Agreement." It was reported in November 2012 that Portugal would support Palestine's UN status upgrade.
Qatar	Y	F	F	Emir Hamad bin Khalifa Al Thani, whose nation is presiding over this General Assembly session, delivered an address at its opening ceremony on 21 September in which he gave his support for the bid and urged fellow members to do the same: "We urge all the members of the UN to listen to the voice of right and respond to the Palestinians legitimate request for a Palestinian state with full membership at the organisation, at equal footing with other peoples in order to prepare the way for the realisation of peace in our region." At the beginning of the month it was reported that Prime Minister Hamad bin Jassim bin Jaber Al Thani had been actively campaigning for the Palestinians' application. His government's efforts were hailed by Abbas and other Palestinian officials.
South Korea	N	ABST	ABST	
Republic of Moldova	N	ABST	ABST	
Romania	Y	ABST	ABST	Prime Minister Emil Boc voiced his opposition to the bid in July, saying, "A negotiated solution between the parties, with no unilateral solution, is the only way to ensure real and solid grounds for a lasting peace." In an interview in mid-September, Foreign Minister Teodor Baconschi said that Romania will abstain from voting if a resolution is put to the General Assembly. He also said that there was no consensus on the subject within the European Union, but that if one forms, Romania will comply. Romania was one of only four states to vote against the approval of Palestine's application to UNESCO. Baconschi explained that he believes UNESCO should not decide on a matter whilst it is under the analysis of the Security Council. He also reinforced his government's opposition to the application, saying, "Romania does not support unilateral initiatives."
Russian Federation	Y	F	F	President Dmitry Medvedev pledged his support for the bid in January 2011. It was reiterated by Foreign Minister Sergei Lavrov at the General Assembly in September. In response to a question regarding the prospect of a veto from the United States, Lavrov said that Russia would prefer to see the request resolved by means of consensus: "Russia has long ago recognised the State of Palestine, and we see no problem to support this bid. ... It's, of course, for the Palestinians to decide. We would prefer to see the issue resolved by consensus. There are also suggestions that they ask the UN General Assembly not for membership, but for an observer state status. But we cannot impose this or that decision on them."
Rwanda	Y	ABST	ABST	
Saint Kitts and Nevis	Y	ABST	F	
Saint Lucia	Y	F	F	
Saint Vincent and the Grenadines	Y	F	F	In his address to the General Assembly, Prime Minister Ralph Gonsalves said: "Saint Vincent and the Grenadines echoes the relevant portions of yesterday's Group of 77 Ministerial Declaration, which welcomed the State of Palestine's application for full membership in the United Nations."
Samoa	N	A	ABST	Tentatively alluding to the matter in his address, Prime Minister Tuila'epa Sailele Malielegaoi said: "It is our long-held conviction that an independent Palestinian nation taking its rightful place in our global family living side by side with a secure Israel is the only road to permanent peace. But while we all know that this is the sensible outcome that must be achieved, it will sadly remain elusive without a clear sense of commitment and willingness by both sides to negotiate in good faith. ... Solutions must be decided by the two parties and not imposed from outside." He did not touch upon the application itself.
San Marino	N	ABST	ABST	San Marino's government reportedly received intense pressure from Israel to vote no on the resolution.
São Tomé and Príncipe	Y	IE	F	
Saudi Arabia	Y	F	F	Foreign Minister Saud al-Faisal blamed the Israeli government's settlement activities for the impasse in negotiations and called on member states to support the application in order to overcome this. He said, "As a result of the continued Israeli intransigence and disruption of the peace process, the Kingdom of Saudi Arabia calls upon all member states of the United Nations to state of Palestine on the border of June 4, 1967 with East Jerusalem as its capital, and to grant it full membership in the United Nations."
Senegal	Y	F	F	In his address to the General Assembly, President Abdoulaye Wade said that his country, as President of the Committee on the Exercise of the Inalienable Rights of the Palestinian People, supported the application for membership. He said: "Senegal reaffirms its support for Palestine and for the international recognition of an independent Palestinian state with East Jerusalem as its capital, co-existing peacefully with Israel, each within secure and internationally recognised borders. As required by the relevant resolutions of the United Nations, the Palestinian people have a place in this forum."
Serbia	Y	F	F	President of Serbia Boris Tadic during his address to the UN General Assembly didn't mention the application for Palestine's membership but later stated in September 2011, that Serbia would decide after hearing the arguments of both sides.
Seychelles	Y	F	F	In September, President James Michel reportedly affirmed his country's full support for the Palestinian bid. Foreign Minister Jean-Paul Adam said that Seychelles will vote in favour of Palestine should a resolution be proposed, and that it will support all decisions that further the two-state solution.
Sierra Leone	Y	IE	F	
Singapore	N	ABST	ABST	
Slovakia	Y	ABST	ABST	
Slovenia	Y	F	ABST	In a letter addressed to Ban Ki-moon dated April 2011, President Danilo Türk claimed that "the moment to solve the Israeli–Palestinian conflict, on the basis of two independent states, Israel and Palestine, living alongside each other peacefully, is now". In June, Foreign Minister Samuel Žbogar stated that his government was ready to "start making [the] first steps towards recognising Palestine", but stressed that the issue of recognition as a state has to be separated from its membership in the UN. He also noted that "Slovenia is not waiting for a joint position of the EU, because there will not be one."
Solomon Islands	N	A	F	Prime Minister Danny Philip did not announce his government's position on the application, but noted that more than two-thirds of UN members had recognised Palestine as a state.
Somalia	Y	F	F	Speaking to the General Assembly, Prime Minister Abdiweli Mohamed Ali said, "We fully support the right of Palestine to become a full member of the Community of Nations", and that "the international community must support the peaceful and democratic aspirations of the people."
South Africa	Y	F	F	President Jacob Zuma threw his country's support behind the bid, stating: "The Palestinian Authority ... has stated its intention to seek UN membership for the State of Palestine. South Africa fully supports this position. It is a decisive step towards achieving lasting peace, economic cooperation and prosperity for the millions of people in the Middle East, and urge that it be viewed favourably." He added, "We are dealing with a people who don't have rights, and as a follow-up to UN human rights kind of condition and principle, I think they have to be given an opportunity because they have been blocked all the time."
South Sudan	Y	IE	F	
Spain	Y	F	F	During the leadup to September, Spain emerged as the most vocal proponent of the Palestinians within the European Union. In late July, Foreign Minister Trinidad Jiménez said that Spain supported the bid, but that it would not determine its position until the proposal was made official. Jiménez confirmed Spain's support in August: "We are working with the idea that there is a majority in the EU that will support moving forward with the recognition of Palestine", adding, "There is a feeling that now is the moment to act, to give the Palestinians some hope that their state will become a reality." She said that if a vote takes place and no common European position has been reached, Spain would vote in favour. In her address to the General Assembly, it appeared that Spain had, officially, committed itself to the compromise proposal reached amongst EU members: "This session may be remembered as the one in which the General Assembly granted Palestine the status of non-member observer state." She added, "This new step could be conceived as a stage towards the legitimate objective of Palestine to become a member state of the United Nations. Effective, sustainable peace can only be achieved through negotiations between the parties. Spain believes that the Palestinians could find in this new status a stimulus for the prompt resumption of negotiations."
Sri Lanka	Y	F	F	Foreign Minister Gamini Peiris affirmed his country's support for the Palestinians' intentions in August. In his address to the General Assembly in September, President Mahinda Rajapaksa expressed disappointment with lack of progress. He called the application "a window of opportunity" and urged "decisive action rather than more discussion".
Sudan	Y	F	F	In his address to the General Assembly, Foreign Minister Ali Ahmed Karti affirmed Sudan's support to the efforts of the Palestinian people to establish their independent state and to obtain a full membership at the United Nations.
Suriname	Y	F	F	In his address to the General Assembly, President Dési Bouterse stated: "Suriname has answered to the plight of the Palestinian people and has taken the decision to recognise Palestine as a sovereign state, worthy of becoming a full-fledged member of this world organisation."
Swaziland	Y	NP	F	Foreign Minister Lutfo Dlamini announced in June his government's support for full membership for the State of Palestine.
Sweden	Y	A	F	Sweden upgraded its Palestinian delegation in Stockholm in early September, a decision that legislators speculated had implied Sweden's voting intentions. Considered one of the most pro-Palestinian states within the EU, Sweden was widely reported by diplomats to be in favour of the bid. However, the government has not officially announced a position, and Prime Minister Fredrik Reinfeldt did not mention the matter in his address to the General Assembly. On 27 November 2012 Sweden announced that it would support the motion to grant Palestine an upgrade in status at the UN.
Switzerland	N	ABST	F	Switzerland was expected to adopt an official position at the end of August 2011, based on the recommendations of the foreign affairs parliamentary committee. On 16 August, the Senate committee advised that Switzerland should not take a position, in line with the country's policy of neutrality. Members of parliament were divided. On 22 November 2012, it was reported that Switzerland has decided to support a Palestinian bid for observer status.
Syrian Arab Republic	Y	F	F	In his speech, Foreign Minister Walid Muallem empathised with the Palestinians and called on member states to support their request: "Negotiations between the two sides have continued for years. They have failed though to achieve any progress towards a solution due to Israeli well-known positions and measures. Therefore, the international community's pursuit of the recognition of Palestinian statehood on the Palestinian territories occupied in 1967 is legitimate. It is a positive step in the direction of restoring all the Palestinian rights. Syria calls on the international community to support this request."
Tajikistan	Y	NP	F	Foreign Minister Hamrokhon Zarifi conveyed Tajikistan's endorsement of the bid in his speech to the General Assembly, saying, "We support the state of Palestine in its efforts to take its well-deserved place in the community of nations as a full-fledged member."
Thailand	Y	ABST	F	
the Former Yugoslav Republic of Macedonia	N	ABST	ABST	
Timor-Leste	Y	NP	F	Upon his country's admission to the General Assembly in 2002, President Xanana Gusmão declared East Timor "ready to recognise the Palestinian state", and did so in 2004. At a summit of the Pacific Islands Forum in September 2011, Foreign Minister Zacarias da Costa pledged his support for the Palestinians' efforts to obtain full membership in the United Nations. In the same month, President José Ramos-Horta appealed to the U.S. and Israel to support, rather than oppose, the application.
Togo	Y	ABST	ABST	
Tonga	N	ABST	ABST	
Trinidad and Tobago	N	ABST	F	
Tunisia	Y	F	F	Speaking to the General Assembly, Foreign Minister Mouldi Kefi announced: "Tunisia strongly supports the Palestinian bid for United Nations recognition as expressed by the President of the Palestinian Authority, Mr. Mahmoud Abbas, last week before the General Assembly, and calls on the international community to support the legitimate Palestinian bid for a full membership in the United Nations."
Turkey	Y	F	F	Prime Minister Recep Tayyip Erdoğan argued that "The most important step that needs to be taken ... is to meet the legitimate demands of the Palestinian people for being recognised as a state and to allow the representatives of the State of Palestine to take their well-deserved place in this august Assembly, as a member of the UN. Turkey's support to the recognition of the State of Palestine is unconditional." He announced that Turkey would actively campaign for international recognition for the Palestinian state.
Turkmenistan	Y	NP	F	
Tuvalu	N	ABST	F	
Uganda	Y	ABST	F	
Ukraine	Y	ABST	NP	On 23 September 2011 a Foreign Ministry spokesman stated that Ukraine had not yet defined its position regarding Palestine's UN membership and added that "Ukraine supports Palestine's efforts for self-determination and independence".
United Arab Emirates	Y	F	F	In his address to the General Assembly, Foreign Minister Abdullah bin Zayed Al Nahyan said: "The UAE also supports the Palestinian Authority's current attempts, which are backed by member countries of the League of Arab States and the UN Members, to gain international recognition of the independent Palestinian state in accordance with relevant international resolutions, the road map, and the Arab Peace Initiative, and also supports Palestine's quest for full membership in the United Nations. The UAE regards this legal step as complimenting the pillars required for the establishment of the Palestinian State, and does not contradict the efforts of resuming peace talks."
United Kingdom	Y	ABST	ABST	
United Republic of Tanzania	Y	F	F	In October, Foreign Minister Bernard Membe affirmed that his country would give everything required to support Palestine in gaining membership within the United Nations and any other international organisation.
United States	N	A	A	In September, President Barack Obama confirmed that the U.S. would veto any Security Council move aimed at recognising Palestinian statehood. A spokesman for the government stated, "We would have to oppose any action at the UN Security Council including, if necessary, vetoing." Obama stated it needs more than a UN voting to solve the conflict without a mutual agreement between the Israeli and Palestinian authorities. Speaking to the General Assembly, he argued, "There is no shortcut to the end of a conflict that has endured for decades. Peace will not come through statements and resolutions at the United Nations ... Ultimately, it is the Israelis and the Palestinians – not us – who must reach agreement on the issues that divide them."
Uruguay	Y	F	F	In his speech to the General Assembly, Foreign Minister Danilo Astori said: "In March we recognised the State of Palestine. We believe that all necessary conditions exist for this recognition to become universal and that the two-state solution, supported by Uruguay since 1947, to become effective."
Uzbekistan	Y	F	F	
Vanuatu	Y	A	ABST	
Vatican City	Y	NM	NM	After the UNGA vote upgrading Palestine's status the Vatican endorsed the resolution, issuing a statement which read "It is hoped that (the resolution) will encourage the commitment of the international community to finding a fair and lasting solution to the Israeli-Palestinian conflict, which may be reached only by resuming negotiations between the parties, in good faith and according due respect to the rights of both."
Venezuela, Bolivarian Republic of	Y	F	F	At the General Assembly, Foreign Minister Nicolás Maduro said, "Venezuela hereby ratifies its unconditional solidarity with the Palestinian people and its unrestricted support to the Palestinian national cause, which naturally includes the immediate admission of a full Palestinian member state within the United Nations."
Vietnam	Y	F	F	On 20 September, the spokesman for the Foreign Ministry stated, "Vietnam has recognised the state of Palestine since 1988 and always supports regional and international efforts towards the establishment of an independent and sovereign Palestinian state that co-exists peacefully with neighbouring Israel with their border line set up before June, 1967. In that spirit, Vietnam supports Palestine's efforts to soon become a member of the United Nations." This position was reiterated in its address to the General Assembly.
Yemen	Y	F	F	
Zambia	Y	ABST	F	
Zimbabwe	Y	F	F	In his address to the General Assembly on 22 September, President Robert Mugabe said, "My country fully supports the right of the gallant people of Palestine to statehood and membership of this UN organisation."

== Implications ==
- The most significant potential consequence of any United Nations resolution granting Palestine member or observer status as a State is the access it gives the Palestinians to international courts. Israel has said this would allow Palestine to pursue legal proceedings against Israel over the ongoing settlement expansion in Palestinian territory, its blockade of the Gaza Strip, or the occupation in general, or Operation Cast Lead. However, Israel could also open cases against Palestine.
- Some scholars have warned of consequences for the rights of Palestinian refugees. Palestinians are regarded internationally as a stateless nation under occupation, and are therefore afforded special rights in many countries. Some critics have argued that a resolution recognising Palestinian statehood would void this status.
- The proposed resolution will not directly impact the situation on the ground. The Palestinian leadership has conceded that negotiations with Israel will be essential to ending the dispute.
- Both sides have warned that the outcome might fuel violence.
- Israeli officials have suggested a variety of possible measures should a resolution go ahead, such as restricting travel privileges for Palestinian leaders, withholding the transfer of tax revenues to the PNA, and annexing settlement blocs in the West Bank in an attempt to circumvent ICC legal action.
- Foreign Minister Saeb Erekat rejected the claim that this would be another declaration of statehood, saying, "We are not going [to the UN] for a unilateral declaration of the Palestinian state. We declared our state in 1988 and we have embassies in more than 130 countries and more countries are recognising our state on the 1967 borders. The recognition of the Palestinian state is a sovereignty decision by the countries and it doesn't need to happen through the UN." President Abbas said that the State of Palestine was already in existence and that the current battle is to have the state's border recognised. In Salam Fayyad's plan for Palestinian statehood, the 1988 declaration is cited four times, identifying it as having articulated "the foundations of the Palestinian state".

== See also ==
- List of United Nations resolutions concerning Israel
- History of the State of Palestine
