= G7 Method =

Printing process

The G7 Method is a print calibration procedure used for visually accurate color reproduction by putting emphasis on matching grayscale colorimetric measurements between processes. By emphasizing the calibration of neutral grays similar to the sensitivities of the human visual system, the G7 Method creates a perceptual foundation that allows color consistency to emerge naturally across diverse print processes and materials. The method is used in many applications of printing such as offset lithography, flexography, and gravure since it uses a one-dimensional neutral print density curve (NPDC) to match neutral tonality between two G7 calibrated printing systems. The G7 method is not a completely accurate color management system nor is it officially standardized by the International Color Consortium (ICC).

== History ==
The G7 method was created by Don Hutcheson, chairman of the IDEAlliance GRACoL (International Digital Enterprise Alliance, General Requirements for Applications in Commercial Offset Lithography) in 2006. It was created to solve the problem of computer to plate (CtP) printing systems and other devices printing images with different tonal value increases (TVIs), or dot gains. Also, professionals in the printing industry follow the International Organization for Standardization’s (ISO) principles of half-tone printing, called ISO 12647-2, which does not specify colorimetric values for gray balance and refers to multiple TVI curves. This results in an ambiguous definition of the print’s final ‘appearance’.

The G7 method solved this problem by creating Neutral Print Density Curves (NPDC) that related neutral density to the half-tone dot percentages of a print image rather than a TVI curve relating the input dot percentage to the output gain relative to the input percentage.

== Definition ==
=== Basic Set-up ===
To calibrate a printing system with the G7 method, it basically entails comparing the NPDC generated by the device to the ‘ideal’ NPDC given in G7 specifications, calibrating the Raster Image Processor (RIP) or the driver of the device, and then repeating the NPDC comparison to check for accuracy. More specifically, one dimensional interpolation between the NPDC graph generated by the printer and the GRACoL 7 NPDC “FanGraph” must be done to generate new dot percentage aim values to be given to the device’s RIP or driver.

=== Colorimetry ===
The G7 method's emphasis on grayscale calibration is loosely based around the concept of neutralizing the camera image of a scene using a gray card. This is done to lower the effects of lighting conditions, such as color temperature, on the resulting image. G7 takes this further by defining percentages of cyan, magenta, and yellow ink at which the image should be gray balanced. It also defines values for a* and b* for the Lab color space.

Most printing systems use half-tones to generate images by using a series of cyan, magenta, yellow, and black dots to recreate colors. This is done by varying the size of the dots so that the human eye can spatially integrate the image's color and make it look like one uniform color.

=== Benefits and disadvantages ===
Using the G7 method for printing calibration is a manual process and is device independent, meaning it can be used for any printing devices that allows manipulation of the raster image processor or computer to plate curve information that dictates how digital signals from an image is printed with ink.

However, since the G7 method relies mostly on gray balance, if the image does not contain much gray information, the calibration can be inaccurate. Also, using any offset printing may be difficult to gray balance because it involves "wet-trapping" which can lead to unpredictable values for dark tones.

== Software ==
IDEAlink Curve Calibration using the G7 method involves comparing two NPDCs from the G7 Fangraph to calculate new aim values that will be given to the printer's RIP files. This can be a manual process, but the IDEAlink curve software, created by Idealliance, does this automatically and with minimal error. Improvements to this program include Curve2 and Curve3. IDEAlink Curve 1.1 software is no longer commercially available. See the list below for systems and software that have received G7 System Certification.

Certified systems and software that meet or exceed established industry tolerances for excellence and are capable of calibrating a printing device to meet the G7 grayscale definition using four 1-D curves.

=== G7 Certified systems/software include the following ===
Agfa process control software/

CGS ORIS Lynx Software

EFI Fiery Color Profile Suite

CHROMiX/HutchColor Curve2

Alwan Dynamic Printer Calibration

KODAK ColorFlow

ColorGATE Productionserver / G7 Calibration Module

Konica Minolta Color Care version 2.2.1 with CurveCore Module

CHROMiX/HutchColor Curve3

Bodoni Systems pressSIGN 6 & later | pressSIGN Standard | pressSIGN Pro | pressSIGN Global Print Management

Mutoh G7 Calibrator (part of the Mutoh ColorVerify Pro/G7 process control for large format inkjet printers)

Caldera Print Standard Verifier G7

Tucanna
