= Group of Seven Plus =

Group of Seven Plus (g7+)
- Group of Seven Plus
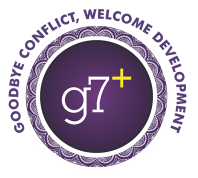
- Logo

- g7+ member states in green
- Abbreviation: g7+
- Formation: 2010
- Type: Intergovernmental organization
- Purpose: Promotes peace and stability; facilitates peer learning on good development practices
- Headquarters: Dili, Timor-Leste
- Members: 20 Countries: Afghanistan; Burundi; Central African Republic; Chad; Comoros; Democratic Republic of the Congo; Guinea; Guinea-Bissau; Haiti; Ivory Coast; Liberia; Papua New Guinea; São Tomé and Príncipe; Sierra Leone; Solomon Islands; Somalia; South Sudan; Timor-Leste; Togo; Yemen; (2023)
- Website: g7+ official website

The Group of Seven Plus (g7+), established in 2010, is an intergovernmental voluntary organisation bringing together countries that are either facing active conflict or have recent experience of conflict and fragility. It has 20 member countries from Africa, Asia-Pacific, Middle East and the Caribbean with a combined population of 260 million.

== Organizational purpose of the g7+ ==
1. Facilitate sharing of lessons learned and good practices for Peacebuilding and Statebuilding, to further the common goals of stability, peace and good governance, and to promote cooperation among member countries.
2. Advocate for reforms in aid management policies and other international engagement in its member countries, to be founded on the principles of effective engagement in development tailored to fragile situations.
3. Promote and advocate for country-led peace- and statebuilding as the basis for any development framework.
4. Promote effective institutions through assisting members in improvements in the spheres of politics, public administration, natural resources, economics and finance.

== Background ==
The g7+ was first conceived at the 3rd High Level Forum on Aid Effectiveness in Accra, Ghana, in 2008 where a side meeting convened the representatives of countries in a fragile situation to discuss how development cooperation works in these countries. The group was further formalized at the first International Dialogue for Peacebuilding and Statebuilding (IDPS) meeting, held in Dili, Timor-Leste in April 2010.

The broader IDPS Meeting produced the Dili Declaration recognising the group and adopting a number of its recommendations. The group has since expanded to represent twenty member countries namely Afghanistan, Burundi, Central African Republic, Chad, Comoros, Ivory Coast, Democratic Republic of the Congo, Guinea, Guinea-Bissau, Haiti, Liberia, Papua New Guinea, São Tomé and Príncipe, Sierra Leone, Somalia, Solomon Islands, South Sudan, East Timor, Togo and Yemen.

== Governance ==
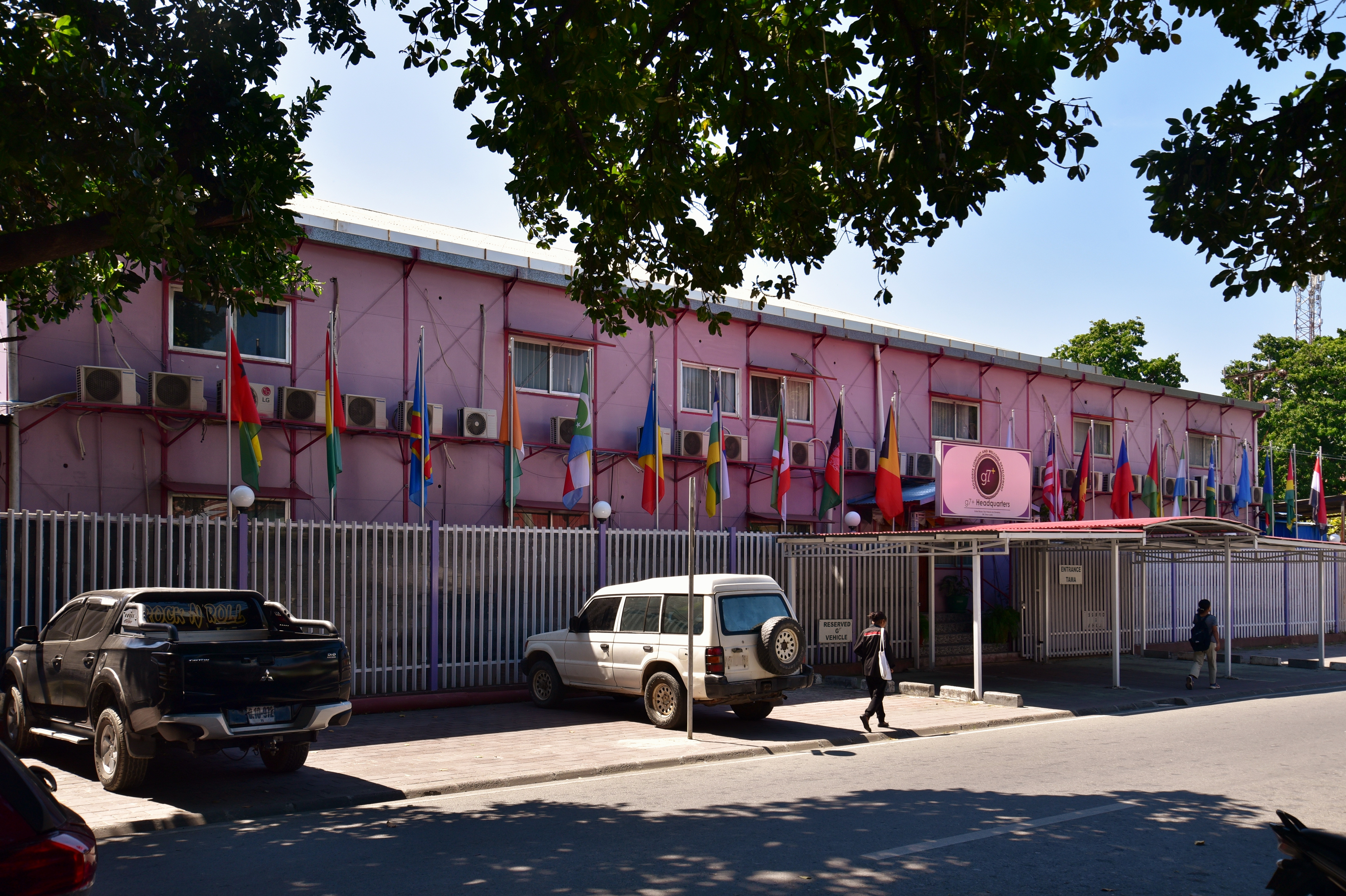
g7+ Headquarters, Dili, Timor-Leste, in 2023

The preeminent decision making body of the group is a Ministerial forum which is convened every year in a member country. Each member state is represented by a Minister. Decisions are made based on consultation among the member countries. The Ministers endorse strategic priorities and an annual plan based on these. The group is chaired by a Minister, selected based on consensus from member countries for a 2-year tenure. The current chair is Sierra Leone's Minister of Finance and Development, Momodu Lamin Kargbo. The g7+ Secretariat functions as an executive body facilitating implementation of the strategic plans and ensuring coordination. The Secretariat is permanently hosted in the Ministry of Finance of the Republic of Timor-Leste, based in Dili. Consultations at technical level are held periodically and on an ad hoc basis among the country focal points, who are senior officials from each member countries.

== Peacebuilding and statebuilding ==
Countries with acute crises, or those which have just emerged from war, conflict or natural disaster, experience difficulties in attaining economic and social development. The World Development Report (World Bank, 2011) found that hardly any of these countries achieved a single Millennium Development Goal. One of the underlying reasons, according to the report, of lagging behind in achieving any development benchmarks in these countries is a lack of peace and strong institutions. The g7+ countries share such challenges and thus sustainable peace and effective state institutions are recognized to be a precursor for economic and social growth. In addition, g7+ countries faced similar of challenges in realizing aid effectiveness principles in their countries, according to the 2008 Paris Declaration monitoring survey, which contributed to further state fragmentation. Thus the g7+ hold the belief that their countries must prioritise peacebuilding and statebuilding to provide foundations that allow them to move towards stability and resilience.

== New Deal for engagement in Fragile states ==
Through the forum of the International Dialogue on Peacebuilding and Statebuilding bringing together g7+ members and donors, a new set of principles for engaging in fragile situations was negotiated and agreed. These principles were embedded in a framework called the New Deal for Engagement in Fragile States. It was endorsed in November 2011, during the 4th High Level Forum on Aid Effectiveness in Busan, South Korea, by more than 40 countries and international organisations.

The New Deal calls for country-led peacebuilding and statebuilding goals (PSGs) to be prioritized at country level by government and development partners.

The PSGs are:

1. Inclusive politics to be fostered to reconcile and resolve conflicts
2. Security to be established for all people
3. Access to justice
4. Economic foundations through the generation of sustainable employment
5. Build capacity to generate and deliver revenue and services

The New Deal aims to ensure mutual accountability between governments, civil society, donors and other international actors. It seeks to address the root causes of conflict and fragility and to pursue a country-led approach for development partnerships, in line with aid effectiveness principles. It seeks harmonization among donors in their development cooperation to avoid aid fragmentation.

The g7+ seeks to promote the implementation of the New Deal principles in its member countries, through improved engagement between governments, development partners and civil society, in order to create better partnerships towards peace and resilience.

Since the endorsement of the New Deal, a monitoring survey was conducted in 2014 to assess the progress of its implementation. The IDPS (International Dialogue on Peacebuilding and Statebuilding) also conducted an independent review of the New Deal in April 2016, to assess the relevance of the New Deal principles in the current era. Both of the studies confirmed that New Deal principles are one of the most effective means for leaving no-one behind in the achievement of Sustainable Development.

== The 2030 Agenda for Sustainable Development ==
The g7+ group also played a crucial role in successfully negotiating the inclusion of a Sustainable Development Goal (SDG) on peace, justice and strong institutions Goal number 16 in the 2030 Agenda that was adopted at the 70th United Nations General Assembly in September 2015, in New York.

The g7+ is now seeking to support the implementation and monitoring of the SDGs in its member countries. The g7+ seeks to maintain the momentum of prioritizing peaceful societies, justice and accountable institutions within Agenda 2030. In addition, the group advocates for a special attention to be granted to the countries in a fragile situation in the implementation of Agenda 2030 due to the peculiarity of their challenges.

To this end, the g7+ will monitor progress across SDGs on the key areas which are common to the membership. The result of this monitoring will then be published to show trends across the g7+ countries while implementing Agenda 2030. The 4th g7+ Ministerial Meeting on 23–24 March 2016 in Kabul, Afghanistan, endorsed g7+ joint tracking of key SDG indicators that will be agreed among the members.

== Peer learning and fragile-to-fragile cooperation ==
Peer-to-peer learning is one of the priorities that emerged in November 2012 at the g7+ Haiti Ministerial Meeting, and is a key pillar of the Fragile-to-Fragile Cooperation (F2F) concept. F2F aims at mobilising cooperation among member countries, developing a network to share knowledge and expertise among them, and applying the collective skills of the group to the specific challenges each country faces.

In the spirit of sharing knowledge, in 2013 and 2014 the g7+ carried out a research and mutual learning project on natural resources management, leading to the publication of a manual entitled "Natural Resources in g7+ countries". In addition, the g7+ Secretariat published a report called "Aid Instruments for Peace and Statebuilding: Putting the New Deal into practice" in 2016, in which different g7+ country case studies highlighted good examples of the application of New Deal principles in the use of aid instruments.

In the spirit of solidarity and under g7+ Fragile-to-Fragile Cooperation, the g7+ group also help in achieving peace and resilience. This is done by launching missions of eminent persons and other senior officials from member countries into a member country facing challenges. In addition, the group helps in mobilizing international support for the member country in trouble. The group also advances cooperation among member countries, for instance, the Government of Timor-Leste assisted Guinea-Bissau and the Central African Republic in their electoral processes in 2014 and 2015 and assisted Liberia, Guinea and Sierra Leone in their fight against Ebola.

== Policy advocacy ==
The g7+ as a group also aims to advocate at a global level for better policies for international engagement in countries affected by conflict and fragility. In addition to successfully advocating for Sustainable Development Goal number 16 to be included in Agenda 2030, the g7+ also have managed to influence donor processes such as the World Bank IDA17 and IDA18 allocation rounds. g7+ advocacy is based on the principles of New Deal for engagement in fragile states and focuses on such matters as national ownership, use of country systems, context sensitive flexible policies and predictable aid. Advocacy is practiced through a combination of research publications, public position statements and regular formal and informal dialogue with key international development partners through the IDPS and other fora. The Independent Review of the New Deal in 2016 found that "The g7+ has become an increasingly influential constituency on the world stage" (Hearn 2016).
