= Energy Innovation and Carbon Dividend Act of 2023 =

U.S. carbon tax bill

- Long title: To create a Carbon Dividend Trust Fund for the American people in order to encourage market-driven innovation of clean energy technologies and market efficiencies which will reduce harmful pollution and leave a healthier, more stable, and more prosperous Nation for future generations
- Enacted by: the 118th United States Congress

Citations
- Public law: H.R.5744 - Energy Innovation and Carbon Dividend Act of 2023

Codification
- Acts amended: Internal Revenue Code; Clean Air Act

Legislative history
- Introduced in the House as H.R. 5744 by Salud Carbajal on September 27, 2023; Committee consideration by the Committee on Ways and Means, the Committee on Energy and Commerce and the Committee on Foreign Affairs

The Energy Innovation and Carbon Dividend Act of 2023 (H.R. 5744) is a bill in the United States House of Representatives that proposes a fee on carbon at the point of extraction to encourage market-driven innovation of clean energy technologies to reduce greenhouse gas emissions. The fees are recycled to citizens in monthly dividends. Most recently on September 27, 2023, the bill was reintroduced in the 118th Congress as H. R. 5744, the Energy Innovation and Carbon Dividend Act of 2023. The act was originally introduced in 2018 with bipartisan support from six co-sponsors and died when the 115th congress ended on 3 January 2019. It is principally based on Citizens' Climate Lobby's carbon fee and dividend proposal, and this organization advocates for the bill.

== 2018 bill ==
The Energy Innovation and Carbon Dividend Act of 2018 was a proposed 2018 bill that intended to "create a Carbon Dividend Trust Fund for the American people in order to encourage market-driven innovation of clean energy technologies and market efficiencies which will reduce harmful pollution and leave a healthier, more stable, and more prosperous nation for future generations." The bill was originally introduced by Representative Ted Deutch (D-FL) on November 27, 2018, with bipartisan support from 4 co-sponsors. A companion bill was introduced into the United States Senate by Chris Coons (D-DE) and Jeff Flake (R-AZ) on December 19, 2018. The bill died when the 115th Congress ended on January 3, 2019. The bill was reintroduced in the 116th Congress as the Energy Innovation and Carbon Dividend Act of 2019.

== 2019 bill ==
On 24 January 2019, the bill was reintroduced into the house by Representative Ted Deutch on behalf of himself and six other original cosponsors.

The 2019 version obtained 86 but was not voted on.

== 2021 bill ==
On April 1, 2021, the bill was reintroduced in the 117th Congress as H.R. 2307, the Energy Innovation and Carbon Dividend Act of 2021.

== Description of the bill ==
The bill intends to:

- Introduce a rising upstream fee on the carbon content of fuels.
- Rebate fee revenues with an equal share to adults with a Social Security number or Taxpayer Identification Number, and a half-share for all minors younger than 19 per household
- Introduce a border carbon adjustment
- Adjust some regulations which would be duplicative, keep others including CAFE vehicle standards

If passed, the 2023 bill would amend the Internal Revenue Code of 1986 to:

- Introduce a carbon tax at the point of extraction, beginning at $15 per metric ton of carbon dioxide equivalent and increasing each year by $10 (adjusted by inflation) or more, depending on its effectiveness, with exemptions for fuel used for military and farm purposes and fluorinated gases,
- rebate revenue with an equal share to adults with a Social Security number or Taxpayer Identification Number, and a half-share for all minors and adults younger than 19 per household, and
- introduce a border carbon adjustment on imported carbon-intensive products to discourage companies moving abroad.

It would also make adjustments to the Clean Air Act to limit the Environmental Protection Agency from placing restrictions on greenhouse gas emissions under some conditions.

== Cosponsors ==
As of September 27, 2023, the bill has been introduced multiple times in the House of Representatives. The sponsors have varied from year to year.

Sponsor	Party	District	2018 Sponsor	2019 Sponsor	2021 Sponsor	2023 Sponsor
Brian Fitzpatrick	Republican	PA-8	Yes	No	No	No
Ted Deutch	Former Democrat	N/A	Yes	Yes	Yes	
Judy Chu	Democratic	CA-27	Yes	Yes	Yes	No
Charlie Crist	Democratic	FL-13	Yes	Yes	Yes	No
Anna Eshoo	Democratic	CA-18	Yes	Yes	Yes	No
Dan Lipinski	Former Democrat	N/A	Yes	Yes		
Francis Rooney	Former Republican	N/A	Yes	Yes		
Scott Peters	Democratic	CA-52	Yes	Yes	Yes	No
Dean Phillips	Democratic	MN-03	No	Yes	Yes	No
Hank Johnson	Democratic	GA-04	No	Yes	Yes	No
Salud Carbajal	Democratic	CA-24	Yes	Yes	Yes	Yes
Alcee Hastings	Democratic	FL-20	No	Yes	No	No
Susan Wild	Democratic	PA-15	No	Yes	Yes	No
Yvette Clarke	Democratic	NY-09	No	Yes	No	No
Jackie Speier	Democratic	CA-14	No	Yes	Yes	No
Jan Schakowsky	Democratic	IL-09	No	Yes	Yes	No
Gerry Connolly	Democratic	VA-11	No	Yes	Yes	No
Chellie Pingree	Democratic	ME-01	No	Yes	Yes	No
Mark DeSaulnier	Democratic	CA-11	No	Yes	Yes	No
Adam Schiff	Democratic	CA-28	No	Yes	Yes	No
Angie Craig	Democratic	MN-02	No	Yes	Yes	No
Tom Malinowski	Democratic	NJ-07	No	Yes	Yes	No
Albio Sires	Democratic	NJ-08	No	Yes	Yes	No
Harley Rouda	Former Democrat	N/A	Yes	Yes		
Jim McGovern	Democratic	MA-02	No	Yes	Yes	No
Barbara Lee	Democratic	CA-13	No	Yes	Yes	No
Gil Cisneros	Former Democrat	N/A	Yes	Yes		
Mike Levin	Democratic	CA-49	Yes	Yes	Yes	No
Pete Aguilar	Democratic	CA-31	Yes	Yes	Yes	No
Denny Heck	Democratic	WA-10	Yes	Yes	Yes	No
Katie Porter	Democratic	CA-45	Yes	Yes	Yes	No
Robin Kelly	Democratic	IL-02	Yes	Yes	Yes	No
Al Lawson	Democratic	FL-05	Yes	Yes	Yes	No
Jim Himes	Democratic	CT-04	Yes	Yes	Yes	No
Andy Levin	Democratic	MI-09	Yes	Yes	Yes	No
Ted Lieu	Democratic	CA-33	Yes	Yes	Yes	No
Seth Moulton	Democratic	MA-06	Yes	Yes	Yes	No
Jamie Raskin	Democratic	MD-08	Yes	Yes	Yes	No
Veronica Escobar	Democratic	TX-16	Yes	Yes	Yes	No
Kathleen Rice	Democratic	NY-04	Yes	Yes	Yes	No
David Price	Democratic	NC-04	Yes	Yes	Yes	No
Susan Davis	Democratic	CA-53	Yes	Yes	Yes	No
Alma Adams	Democratic	NC-12	Yes	Yes	Yes	No
Dwight Evans	Democratic	PA-03	Yes	Yes	Yes	No
Madeleine Dean	Democratic	PA-04	Yes	Yes	Yes	No
Bennie Thompson	Democratic	MS-02	Yes	Yes	Yes	No
Dan Kildee	Democratic	MI-05	Yes	Yes	Yes	No
Steve Cohen	Democratic	TN-09	Yes	Yes	Yes	No
Joe Neguse	Democratic	CO-02	Yes	Yes	Yes	No
Danny Davis	Democratic	IL-07	Yes	Yes	Yes	No
Brenda Lawrence	Democratic	MI-14	Yes	Yes	Yes	No
David Trone	Democratic	MD-06	Yes	Yes	Yes	No
Matt Cartwright	Democratic	PA-08	Yes	Yes	Yes	No
Karen Bass	Democratic	CA-37	Yes	Yes	Yes	No
Bonnie Watson Coleman	Democratic	NJ-12	Yes	Yes	Yes	No
Dutch Ruppersberger	Democratic	MD-02	Yes	Yes	Yes	No
Joseph Morelle	Democratic	NY-25	Yes	Yes	Yes	No
Derek Kilmer	Democratic	WA-06	Yes	Yes	Yes	No
Lucy McBath	Democratic	GA-06	Yes	Yes	Yes	No
Ed Perlmutter	Democratic	CO-07	Yes	Yes	Yes	No
Emanuel Cleaver	Democratic	MO-05	Yes	Yes	Yes	No
Brad Sherman	Democratic	CA-30	Yes	Yes	Yes	No
Jesús "Chuy" García	Democratic	IL-04	Yes	Yes	Yes	No
Thomas Suozzi	Democratic	NY-03	Yes	Yes	Yes	No
Lou Correa	Democratic	CA-46	Yes	Yes	Yes	No
Lucille Roybal-Allard	Democratic	CA-40	Yes	Yes	Yes	No
Grace Meng	Democratic	NY-06	Yes	Yes	Yes	No
Linda Sánchez	Democratic	CA-38	Yes	Yes	Yes	No
John Yarmuth	Democratic	KY-03	Yes	Yes	Yes	No
Gregory Meeks	Democratic	NY-05	Yes	Yes	Yes	No
Sanford Bishop	Democratic	GA-02	Yes	Yes	Yes	No
Sean Patrick Maloney	Democratic	NY-18	Yes	Yes	Yes	No
Donald M. Payne	Democratic	NJ-10	Yes	Yes	Yes	No
Lacy Clay	Democratic	MO-1	Yes	Yes	Yes	No
Ami Bera	Democratic	CA-7	Yes	Yes	Yes	No
Ann McLane Kuster	Democratic	NH-02	Yes	Yes	Yes	No
Grace Napolitano	Democratic	CA-32	Yes	Yes	Yes	No
Mary Gay Scanlon	Democratic	PA-05	Yes	Yes	Yes	No
Jason Crow	Democratic	CO-06	Yes	Yes	Yes	No
Frederica Wilson	Democratic	FL-24	Yes	Yes	Yes	No
Tony Cardenas	Democratic	CA-29	Yes	Yes	Yes	No
Norma Torres	Democratic	CA-35	Yes	Yes	Yes	No
Mike Quigley	Democratic	IL-05	Yes	Yes	Yes	No
Andre Carson	Democratic	IN-07	Yes	Yes	Yes	No
John Garamendi	Democratic	CA-03	Yes	Yes	Yes	No
Joyce Beatty	Democratic	OH-03	Yes	Yes	Yes	No

== Reactions ==
The Center on Global Energy Policy published a comparison of the 2018 version of the bill to other carbon tax proposals.

=== Support ===
In the weeks following the reintroduction of the bill, several publications including The Washington Post, the Missoulian, and the Daily Camera published op-eds and editorials in support of the bill.

The bill is also supported by climate scientist and activist James Hansen and former secretary of state George Shultz. The governments (or parts of the governments) of several localities, including the following with more than 50,000 residents, have signed resolutions urging the United States Congress to pass the act:

- Anchorage, Alaska
- Birmingham, Alabama Transit Citizens Advisory Board
- Bloomington, Indiana Environmental Commission
- Cincinnati, Ohio
- Coconut Creek, Florida
- Corvallis, Oregon City Council
- Durham, North Carolina
- Encinitas, California
- Hoboken, New Jersey
- Jackson, Mississippi
- Los Angeles County, California
- Olympia, Washington
- Palm Beach County, Florida
- Richmond, California
- Rochester, New York
- San Jose, California
- Santa Ana, California
- Syracuse, New York
- Tompkins County, New York

It has also been publicly supported by several small businesses and nonprofit organizations including Protect Our Winters.

=== Opposition ===
The Center for Biological Diversity published a press release opposing the bill on the basis that its adjustments to the Clean Air Act would "only give us climate disaster."

In April 2019, novelist and leading member of Orange County for Climate Action Roger Gloss posted his opposition to HR 763, noting the lack of annual emissions targets, and the first assessment of whether targets are being met in 2030, the year in which the IPCC says emissions must have already been halved.

== See also ==
- Carbon tax
- Carbon fee and dividend
- Citizens' Climate Lobby
