= Destination-based cash flow tax =

Proposed form of border adjustment tax

A destination-based cash flow tax (DBCFT) is a cash flow tax with a destination-based border-adjustment. Unlike traditional corporate income tax, firms are able to immediately expense all capital investment (called "full expensing"). This ensures that normal profit is out of the tax base and only supernormal profits are taxed. Additionally, the destination-based border-adjustment is the same as how the value-added tax treat cross-border transactions—by exempting exports but taxing imports.

It was proposed in the United States by the Republican Party in their 2016 policy paper "A Better Way — Our Vision for a Confident America", which promoted a move to the tax. It has been described by some sources as simply a form of import tariff, while others have argued that it has different consequences than those of a simple tariff because the exchange rates would fully adjust.

According to economist Alan J. Auerbach at the University of California, Berkeley, who is the "principal intellectual champion" of the "package of ideas" surrounding border-adjustment tax that had been evolving in academia over a number of years, the destination-based system, which is focused on where a product is consumed, eliminates incentives that multinationals now have to "game the system" through tax inversion and other means, in order to "avoid taxes" and to "shelter profits" by "shifting" "intangible assets to low-tax nations."

Introducing this was the linchpin of the Republican Party's 2016 tax-reform proposal. A major aspect of the tax policy change would result in lowering the corporate tax rate from 35% to 20% by adjusting or removing export sales from the company's taxable revenue, thus leaving domestic exporters with a tax advantage. Offsetting that reduction in tax revenue, the border-adjustment tax applied to imports consumed domestically. Auerbach's theory is that a border-adjustment tax of 20% would strengthen the US dollar by about 25%. More exports will assumedly be sold because of their lower costs under the border tax subsidy. The stronger dollar would keep domestic consumer costs lower in spite of the 20% corporate income tax being applied to imported goods consumed domestically, effectively cancelling out the higher tax on imports and making the border-adjustment tax value-neutral.

However, both The Economist and the Brookings Institution caution that there is uncertainty as to how the currency exchange will respond. Unless it is immediate and as complete as Auerbach anticipates, the increased cost to importers would result in higher consumer prices which would "hit low-income households disproportionately." Some economists and policy makers have also expressed concern that other countries could challenge border-adjustment tax with the World Trade Organization or impose retaliatory tariffs; and there is also strong opposition by some US corporate interests.

== History ==
Over the years, Auerbach has worked with Michael Devereux, who had co-introduced with Stephen R. Bond, the term destination-based corporate tax. Auerbach described a "corporate tax system" in which the "incentives" would be aligned with the "national interest." In designing a "destination-based system, focusing on where a product is consumed", Auerbach wanted to eliminate incentives that multinationals now have to "game the system" in order to "avoid taxes" and to "shelter profits" by "shifting" "intangible assets to low-tax nations." As early as 1997, Auerbach mentioned the concept in a 1997 article published in the American Economic Review. How exchange rates respond to the implementation of a border-adjustment tax will impact positively or negatively on the economy. Bloomberg View described it as a "tariff plus export subsidy." While in theory, a border-adjustment tax is trade neutral, both The Economist and the Brookings Institution caution that if the exchange rate did not adjust, it would be painful for importers and low-income households.

== Context ==
In the United States, 14 more corporate inversions were reported in 2014 alone in a wave of inversions that threatened to "undermine the U.S. tax base" and economy", according to Sander Levin, (D-Michigan), then-leader of the Ways and Means Committee. Auerbach had promoted his tax policies within government agencies for many years, but it was in 2016 that Kevin Brady (R-Texas), Ways and Means Committee Chairman included most of Auerbach's recommendations in his blueprint. Brady, who was leader of the Tax Reform Task Force, one of six task forces created by House Speaker Paul D. Ryan on February 4, 2016, spearheaded the GOP effort to "create a 21st century tax code built for growth." On June 24, they presented a policy paper, entitled "A Better Way: Our Vision for a Confident America", which promoted a move to "a destination-basis tax system." The paper, which is part of a "series of "blueprint" white papers" that outline major policy changes", described how the proposed "territorial tax system" would end the United States' existing "uncompetitive worldwide tax approach." The blueprint would also cut "the corporate tax rate to 20 percent from 35 percent" so the border tax is needed as revenue offset. In a February 17, 2017 interview with Bloomberg, Brady described the "centerpiece of Ryan's tax blueprint" the GOP as an "idea to tax imports and exempt exports would make U.S. companies more competitive globally and reduce their current motivations to move abroad."

According to the Tax Foundation, the border-adjusted tax would "raise about $1.1 trillion in revenue" by 2027 "which would help to offset the blueprint's corporate and income tax cuts." As Ryan defended border-adjustment levy at a press conference on February 17, the Koch brothers-funded Americans for Prosperity (AFP), an influential lobby group, unveiled their plan to fight the taxes. In President Trump's cabinet, supporters include Steve Bannon, Senior Counselor while Gary Cohn, the former Goldman Sachs investment banker and executive, Director of the National Economic Council is opposed. Senator Tom Cotton (Arkansas) estimated that the one billion a year that corporations will save in revenue would be paid by working Americans as they purchase T-shirts and baby clothes. Also Treasury Secretary Steve Mnuchin has raised concerns.

== 1993–2017 corporate tax system ==
Between 1993 and 2017, the top U.S. tax income bracket taxed corporations at a rate of 35%. Some argue this rate is the "highest in the industrialized world", while others argue it isn't. The rate varies from sector to sector, and can be as low as 21% in the manufacturing industry. A high tax rate would place the U.S. at a "competitive disadvantage in the global marketplace." and encourages corporations to move to countries with lower taxes. The current tax system also provides a "tax deduction for imported goods", providing another incentive for companies to leave. Companies that import inventory before ultimately selling their product domestically to U.S. consumers can deduct the cost of imports from their taxable income as part of cost of goods sold giving the company a sometimes sizable benefit. As explained in Forbes, the border-adjustment tax "would move away from a direct income tax, and more toward an indirect "cash flow" tax" where a "corporation would be entitled to immediately deduct the cost of all asset purchases." and the "corporate tax rate would be reduced to 20%. Although this is being compared to a value added tax (VAT), "under a typical VAT...the corporation couldn't deduct its wages." but under the Brady and Ryan blueprint, wages could be deducted so this would be an "indirect VAT."

Under current law, the U.S. has a true "income tax," which is a direct tax on [.] the income of a corporation... but not on the total income. [T]he corporation is permitted to deduct both the cost of any goods sold -- whether produced or purchased for resale -- and general and administrative expenses like wages, advertising, interest expense, depreciation, etc... Once you've settled onto that net income number, a 35% income tax is assessed.

— Nitti January 26, 2017. Forbes

To encourage companies to export, the border adjustment tax system would "adjust" the company's tax to account for the exported sales by removing the amount of the export sales from the company's revenue number, creating a tax advantage for domestic exporters.

Firms currently pay corporate taxes on their profits. Border-adjustment would change how those profits are calculated. Accountants could no longer deduct imports—say, goods brought in from China—as costs. And their exports would no longer count as revenues. For tax purposes, "profits" would be domestic sales minus domestic costs.

— The Economist

== Comparison to value-added tax ==
Map of countries & territories by their VAT status No VAT VAT

Except for the United States, all OECD countries employ some form of value-added tax (VAT) as do 160 other countries.

In the US, the concept of a value-added tax has been the subject of much debate in academia and in politics, and a business "flat tax", or a national subtraction-method VAT, was among the proposals put forward to replace the corporate income tax in 2008.

Instead, a sales and use tax was common in most US states.

According to an article co-authored by Auerbach for the American Action Forum, the border-adjusted tax included in the GOP 2016 tax reform proposal would "convert the current corporate income tax into what is called a 'destination-based cash flow tax'" (DBCFT). Although a DBCFT is similar to a VAT, according to the Tax Foundation, the GOP's business tax is not a VAT because it allows businesses to deduct payroll while a VAT does not.

Caroline Freund, a senior fellow at the Peterson Institute for International Economics, described how the "Better Way" plan incorporates "border-tax adjustments into business taxes." It makes "exports tax-exempt, while companies could not deduct expenditures on imports from their tax base." She compared the border-adjustment tax proposed by the GOP in 2016 to the value-added tax (VAT) that many other countries use. The former is a business tax while the latter is a sales tax; the former is protectionist and the VAT, like a sales tax, is not. Freund uses the example of Maryland's 6% sales tax, which applies to all imports regardless of where they are produced. It is not a destination-based consumption tax, therefore it is neither protectionist nor discriminatory unlike the proposed DBCFT. The destination-based cash-flow tax (or DBCFT) allows for wage deductions, while a VAT does not.

Under the cash-flow tax with border adjustment, imports would be charged a uniform 20% and unlike "the sales tax, the cash-flow tax with border adjustment would favor domestically produced goods."

== How it would work ==
Firms currently pay corporate taxes on their profits. Border-adjustment would change how those profits are calculated. Accountants could no longer deduct imports—say, goods brought in from China—as costs. And their exports would no longer count as revenues. For tax purposes, "profits" would be domestic sales minus domestic costs. Effectively, imports would be taxed, and exports would be subsidised. As a result, retailers, who stock their shelves with imported wares, are lobbying against the change. Exporters, such as the aerospace industry, broadly support it.

— The Economist February 13, 2017

By February 17, 2017, under the Tax Code, if a corporation produces a product domestically and sells it internationally, the company must pay income taxes on the difference between the tax deduction eligible input costs and the sale price. However, if a corporation imports a product that is manufactured internationally and sells it domestically, the company pays income tax on the difference between the foreign purchase price and domestic sale price.

In theory, a border-adjustment tax is trade-neutral: the stronger domestic currency would make exports more expensive internationally, lowering demand for exported products while reducing the costs incurred by domestic firms in purchasing goods and services in foreign markets, helping importers. Thus, the anticipated strengthening of the domestic currency effectively neutralizes the border-adjustment tax, resulting in a trade-neutral outcome. Auerbach's theory is that a border-adjustment tax would strengthen the dollar by an amount corresponding to the tax and the stronger dollar would theoretically reduce the price of imported goods, effectively cancelling out the higher tax on imports and making the border-adjustment tax value neutral.

The Economist warns that in reality, "Nobody knows for sure what would happen.... If the economy failed to adjust, importers would pay a lot more tax, and exporters would get a windfall. Any adjustment would be painful. To offset a border-adjusted tax of 20%—the rate favoured by House Republicans—the greenback would need to rise fully 25%, enough to destabilise emerging markets burdened with dollar-denominated debts." However, the Brookings Institution also caution, "If the exchange rate does not adjust fully and immediately, though, the effects of the border adjustment could be quite different. Exports would rise, imports would fall, and the trade deficit would fall. Consumer prices would rise, fueled by higher import costs, and this would hit low-income households disproportionately."

== Advantages ==
According to the Tax Foundation, there are several advantages to implementing a border-adjustment tax It would "raise revenue in the least distortive manner in order to lower overall rates for U.S. taxpayers." It would "raise $1.1 trillion over 10 years" and "lower the corporate income tax rate from 35 percent to 20 percent." It would "protect the U.S. tax base by improving business incentives" by "changing the system from taxing companies based on where they produce to based on where they sell." It would "simplify the business tax system" by replacing "most of these complicated international tax rules." Additionally, by exempting foreign transactions from taxation (i.e. levying a tax on goods produced domestically but sold internationally), the DBCFT removes a strong incentive for firms to relocate (or off-shore) profits or profitable activities. The burden of the tax would be borne, primarily, by individuals and businesses who own foreign (non-domestic) assets.

=== Border-adjustment tax and US corporations ===
Border-adjustment taxes would eliminate incentives that drive US corporations to "shift profit overseas and overcharge for purchases from subsidiaries abroad." For example, Apple Inc has been criticized for allegedly gaming the existing tax system.

== Disadvantages ==
Those who oppose the border-adjustment tax have concerns about the impact on the US dollar exchange rate, which would benefit countries like China and Japan that hold a large portion of the US debt, retaliations by trade partners, legal challenges through the World Trade Organization, and benefits to larger American corporations that export at the cost of smaller and medium-sized domestic companies that import, and therefore their customers, especially middle- and lower-income American consumers.

=== Changes in exchange rate ===
If the exchange rate does not adjust fully and immediately, though, the effects of the border adjustment could be quite different. Exports would rise, imports would fall, and the trade deficit would fall. Consumer prices would rise, fueled by higher import costs, and this would hit low-income households disproportionately.

— Brookings Guide 2017

"If the dollar goes up 25%, U.S. holders of foreign assets—including pension funds and endowments—would suffer a one-time loss in wealth of more than $2 trillion."

According to The Washington Post, as foreign exchange rates adjust to the border adjustment tax by increasing the value of the dollar, as predicted by some Republicans and many economists, an "underappreciated effect" of a strong dollar would be the increase in the value of "dollar-denominated U.S. debt held by foreigners" such as the Chinese government.

=== WTO challenges ===
The European Union and other trading partners could challenge border-adjustment tax with the World Trade Organization. In its current iteration, it could be non-compatible, as rules state that imported goods be treated the same as domestically produced goods. The DBCFT, however, taxes the entire value of the import but only the above-normal return to capital owners of domestically produced goods. According to a January 18, 2017 article in Bloomberg View, while it has been asserted that the proposed border-adjustment tax would be compatible with WTO rules, that is controversial. The proposed tax could disfavor imports over domestically produced goods. The wage component of goods that are produced domestically would not be taxed.

=== Disproportionately impacted ===
Critics have argued that a border-adjustment tax may disproportionately and adversely impact domestic companies that import products or parts, such as those in the retail, clothing, shoes, automotive, consumer electronics, and oil industries while favoring large, domestic exporters, such as those in the aerospace, defense or technology sectors. Industrial multinational companies who are exporters, such as Dow Chemical Co., Pfizer, General Electric and Boeing, support the levy. Along with Koch Industries, those who oppose it include oil refiners, car dealers, represented by American International Automobile Dealers Association including Toyota Motor Corp, toy manufacturers, retailers such as Target Corporation, Gap Inc., Nike Inc., McCormick & Co., and Walmart, which depend on "importing foreign-made goods." They claim that "it would drive up import costs and force them to raise prices."

=== Retaliatory tariffs ===
Some economists and policy makers have expressed concern that such a policy may result in retaliatory tariffs against domestic firms.

== See also ==
- Balance of trade
- Border-adjustment tax
- X tax, a similar 2004 proposal by David F. Bradford
