= Energy Innovation and Carbon Dividend Act of 2019 =

U.S. carbon tax bill

- Long title: To create a Carbon Dividend Trust Fund for the American people in order to encourage market-driven innovation of clean energy technologies and market efficiencies which will reduce harmful pollution and leave a healthier, more stable, and more prosperous nation for future generations.
- Enacted by: the 116th United States Congress

Citations
- Public law: H.R.763 - Energy Innovation and Carbon Dividend Act of 2019

Codification
- Acts amended: Internal Revenue Code; Clean Air Act

Legislative history
- Introduced in the House as H.R. 763 by Ted Deutch on January 24, 2019; Committee consideration by the Committee on Ways and Means, the Committee on Energy and Commerce and the Committee on Foreign Affairs

The Energy Innovation and Carbon Dividend Act of 2019 (H.R. 763) is a bill in the United States House of Representatives that proposes a fee on carbon at the point of extraction to encourage market-driven innovation of clean energy technologies to reduce greenhouse gas emissions. The fees are recycled to citizens in monthly dividends. The act was originally introduced in 2018 with bipartisan support from six co-sponsors and died when the 115th congress ended on 3 January 2019. It is principally based on the Citizens' Climate Lobby's carbon fee and dividend proposal, and this organization advocates for the bill.

On 24 January 2019, the bill was introduced into the house by Representative Ted Deutch on behalf of himself and six other original cosponsors.

The bill obtained 86 cosponsors but was not voted on. On April 1, 2021, the bill was reintroduced in the 117th Congress as H.R. 2307, the Energy Innovation and Carbon Dividend Act of 2021. On September 27, 2023, the bill was reintroduced in the 118th Congress as H. R. 5744, the Energy Innovation and Carbon Dividend Act of 2023.

== 2018 bill ==
The Energy Innovation and Carbon Dividend Act of 2018 was a proposed 2018 bill that intended to "create a Carbon Dividend Trust Fund for the American people in order to encourage market-driven innovation of clean energy technologies and market efficiencies which will reduce harmful pollution and leave a healthier, more stable, and more prosperous nation for future generations." The bill was originally introduced by Representative Ted Deutch (D-FL) on November 27, 2018, with bipartisan support from 4 co-sponsors. A companion bill was introduced into the United States Senate by Chris Coons (D-DE) and Jeff Flake (R-AZ) on December 19, 2018. The bill died when the 115th Congress ended on January 3, 2019. The bill was reintroduced in the 116th Congress as the Energy Innovation and Carbon Dividend Act of 2019.

== Description of the bill ==
The 2018 bill was intended to:

- Introduce a rising upstream fee on the carbon content of fuels.
- Rebate fee revenues with an equal share to adults with a Social Security number or Taxpayer Identification Number, and a half-share for all minors younger than 19 per household
- Introduce a border carbon adjustment
- Adjust some regulations which would be duplicative and keep others including CAFE vehicle standards

If passed, the 2019 bill would amend the Internal Revenue Code of 1986 to:

- Introduce a carbon tax at the point of extraction, beginning at $15 per metric ton of carbon dioxide equivalent and increasing each year by $10 (adjusted by inflation) or more, depending on its effectiveness, with exemptions for fuel used for military and farm purposes and fluorinated gases,
- rebate revenue with an equal share to adults with a Social Security number or Taxpayer Identification Number, and a half-share for all minors and adults younger than 19 per household, and
- introduce a border carbon adjustment on imported carbon-intensive products to discourage companies from moving abroad.

It would also make adjustments to the Clean Air Act to limit the Environmental Protection Agency from placing restrictions on greenhouse gas emissions under some conditions.

== Cosponsors ==
As of December 17, 2020, the bill has 86 sponsors in the House of Representatives from two parties and 23 states.

Sponsor	Party	District	Original?	Sponsor since	Relevant committees (Note: Ways and Means Committee, Energy and Commerce Committee, Foreign Affairs Committee, Energy Subcommittee)
Ted Deutch	Democratic	FL-21	Yes	January 24, 2019	Foreign Affairs Committee
Judy Chu	Democratic	CA-27	Yes	January 24, 2019	Ways and Means Committee
Charlie Crist	Democratic	FL-13	Yes	January 24, 2019	
Anna Eshoo	Democratic	CA-18	Yes	January 24, 2019	Energy and Commerce Committee
Dan Lipinski	Democratic	IL-03	Yes	January 24, 2019	
Francis Rooney	Republican	FL-19	Yes	January 24, 2019	Foreign Affairs Committee
Scott Peters	Democratic	CA-52	Yes	January 24, 2019	Energy and Commerce Committee, Energy Subcommittee
Dean Phillips	Democratic	MN-03	No	January 28, 2019	Foreign Affairs Committee
Hank Johnson	Democratic	GA-04	No	January 29, 2019	
Salud Carbajal	Democratic	CA-24	No	January 30, 2019	
Alcee Hastings	Democratic	FL-20	No	February 7, 2019	
Susan Wild	Democratic	PA-15	No	February 8, 2019	Foreign Affairs Committee
Yvette Clarke	Democratic	NY-09	No	February 11, 2019	Energy and Commerce Committee (vice chair)
Jackie Speier	Democratic	CA-14	No	February 12, 2019	
Jan Schakowsky	Democratic	IL-09	No	February 22, 2019	Energy and Commerce Committee
Gerry Connolly	Democratic	VA-11	No	March 4, 2019	Foreign Affairs Committee
Chellie Pingree	Democratic	ME-01	No	March 6, 2019	
Mark DeSaulnier	Democratic	CA-11	No	March 7, 2019	
Adam Schiff	Democratic	CA-28	No	March 8, 2019	
Angie Craig	Democratic	MN-02	No	March 18, 2019	
Tom Malinowski	Democratic	NJ-07	No	March 21, 2019	Foreign Affairs Committee
Albio Sires	Democratic	NJ-08	No	March 21, 2019	Foreign Affairs Committee
Harley Rouda	Democratic	CA-48	No	March 25, 2019	
Jim McGovern	Democratic	MA-02	No	March 25, 2019	
Barbara Lee	Democratic	CA-13	No	March 26, 2019	
Gil Cisneros	Democratic	CA-39	No	March 26, 2019	
Mike Levin	Democratic	CA-49	No	March 27, 2019	
Pete Aguilar	Democratic	CA-31	No	April 8, 2019	
Denny Heck	Democratic	WA-10	No	April 10, 2019	
Katie Porter	Democratic	CA-45	No	April 12, 2019	
Robin Kelly	Democratic	IL-02	No	April 18, 2019	Energy and Commerce Committee, Energy Subcommittee
Al Lawson	Democratic	FL-05	No	April 18, 2019	
Jim Himes	Democratic	CT-04	No	April 25, 2019	
Andy Levin	Democratic	MI-09	No	April 25, 2019	Foreign Affairs Committee
Ted Lieu	Democratic	CA-33	No	April 29, 2019	Foreign Affairs Committee
Seth Moulton	Democratic	MA-06	No	May 7, 2019	
Jamie Raskin	Democratic	MD-08	No	May 9, 2019	
Veronica Escobar	Democratic	TX-16	No	May 20, 2019	
Kathleen Rice	Democratic	NY-04	No	May 23, 2019	
David Price	Democratic	NC-04	No	May 28, 2019	
Susan Davis	Democratic	CA-53	No	May 28, 2019	
Alma Adams	Democratic	NC-12	No	June 10, 2019	
Dwight Evans	Democratic	PA-03	No	June 10, 2019	
Madeleine Dean	Democratic	PA-04	No	June 10, 2019	
Bennie Thompson	Democratic	MS-02	No	June 11, 2019	
Dan Kildee	Democratic	MI-05	No	June 12, 2019	Ways and Means Committee
Steve Cohen	Democratic	TN-09	No	June 13, 2019	
Joe Neguse	Democratic	CO-02	No	June 18, 2019	
Danny Davis	Democratic	IL-07	No	June 18, 2019	Ways and Means Committee
Brenda Lawrence	Democratic	MI-14	No	June 20, 2019	
David Trone	Democratic	MD-06	No	June 20, 2019	Foreign Affairs Committee
Matt Cartwright	Democratic	PA-08	No	June 25, 2019	
Karen Bass	Democratic	CA-37	No	July 5, 2019	Foreign Affairs Committee
Bonnie Watson Coleman	Democratic	NJ-12	No	July 9, 2019	
Dutch Ruppersberger	Democratic	MD-02	No	July 9, 2019	
Joseph Morelle	Democratic	NY-25	No	July 11, 2019	
Derek Kilmer	Democratic	WA-06	No	July 15, 2019	
Lucy McBath	Democratic	GA-06	No	July 17, 2019	
Ed Perlmutter	Democratic	CO-07	No	July 19, 2019	
Emanuel Cleaver	Democratic	MO-05	No	August 30, 2019	
Brad Sherman	Democratic	CA-30	No	September 6, 2019	Foreign Affairs Committee
Jesús "Chuy" García	Democratic	IL-04	No	September 16, 2019	
Thomas Suozzi	Democratic	NY-03	No	September 24, 2019	Ways and Means Committee
Lou Correa	Democratic	CA-46	No	September 26, 2019	
Lucille Roybal-Allard	Democratic	CA-40	No	September 26, 2019	
Grace Meng	Democratic	NY-06	No	October 16, 2019	
Linda Sánchez	Democratic	CA-38	No	October 21, 2019	Ways and Means Committee
John Yarmuth	Democratic	KY-03	No	October 29, 2019	
Gregory Meeks	Democratic	NY-05	No	November 8, 2019	Foreign Affairs Committee
Sanford Bishop	Democratic	GA-02	No	November 12, 2019	
Sean Patrick Maloney	Democratic	NY-18	No	November 12, 2019	
Donald M. Payne	Democratic	NJ-10	No	November 13, 2019	
Lacy Clay	Democratic	MO-1	No	November 13, 2019	
Ami Bera	Democratic	CA-7	No	December 5, 2019	
Ann McLane Kuster	Democratic	NH-02	No	January 27, 2020	
Grace Napolitano	Democratic	CA-32	No	January 27, 2020	
Mary Gay Scanlon	Democratic	PA-05	No	February 10, 2020	
Jason Crow	Democratic	CO-06	No	February 13, 2020	
Frederica Wilson	Democratic	FL-24	No	February 21, 2020	Foreign Affairs Committee
Tony Cardenas	Democratic	CA-29	No	June 22, 2020	Energy and Commerce Committee
Norma Torres	Democratic	CA-35	No	August 7, 2020	
Mike Quigley	Democratic	IL-05	No	December 9, 2020	
Andre Carson	Democratic	IN-07	No	December 9, 2020	
John Garamendi	Democratic	CA-03	No	December 14, 2020	
Joyce Beatty	Democratic	OH-03	No	December 17, 2020	

== Reactions ==
The Center on Global Energy Policy published a comparison of the 2018 version of the bill to other carbon tax proposals.

=== Support ===
In the weeks following the reintroduction of the bill, several publications including The Washington Post, the Missoulian, and the Daily Camera published op-eds and editorials in support of the bill.

The bill is also supported by climate scientist and activist James Hansen and former secretary of state George Shultz. The governments (or parts of the governments) of several localities, including the following with more than 50,000 residents, have signed resolutions urging the United States Congress to pass the act:

- Anchorage, Alaska
- Birmingham, Alabama Transit Citizens Advisory Board
- Bloomington, Indiana Environmental Commission
- Cincinnati, Ohio
- Coconut Creek, Florida
- Corvallis, Oregon City Council
- Durham, North Carolina
- Encinitas, California
- Hoboken, New Jersey
- Jackson, Mississippi
- Los Angeles County, California
- Olympia, Washington
- Palm Beach County, Florida
- Richmond, California
- Rochester, New York
- San Jose, California
- Santa Ana, California
- Syracuse, New York
- Tompkins County, New York

It has also been publicly supported by several small businesses and nonprofit organizations including Protect Our Winters.

The Environmental Defense Fund called it "an inspiring step in the right direction."

=== Opposition ===
The Center for Biological Diversity published a press release opposing the bill on the basis that its adjustments to the Clean Air Act would "only give us climate disaster."

In April 2019, novelist and leading member of Orange County for Climate Action Roger Gloss posted his opposition to HR 763, noting the lack of annual emissions targets, and the first assessment of whether targets are being met in 2030, the year in which the IPCC says emissions must have already been halved.

== See also ==
- Carbon tax
- Carbon fee and dividend
- Citizens' Climate Lobby
