= Carbondale Hill =

Summit in Alberta, Canada

Coordinates: 49.431°N 114.359°W

Carbondale Hill is a summit in Alberta, Canada.

Carbondale Hill was so named on account of coal-mining activities; coal is a carbon-based fuel.
