= Value-added tax =

Form of consumption tax

A map of countries and territories by their VAT status, 2025 No VAT VAT

A value-added tax (VAT), goods and services tax (GST), or general consumption tax (GCT) is a consumption tax that is levied on the value added at each stage of a product's production and distribution. VAT is similar to, and is often compared with, a sales tax. VAT is an indirect tax because individuals do not pay it directly to the government; instead, suppliers act as intermediaries by collecting the tax from customers at the point of sale and remitting it to the government. Specific goods and services are typically exempted in various jurisdictions.

Products exported to other countries are typically exempted from the tax, typically via a rebate to the exporter. VAT is usually implemented as a destination-based tax, with the tax rate determined by the customer's location. VAT raises about a fifth of total tax revenues worldwide and among the members of the Organisation for Economic Co-operation and Development (OECD). As of January 2025, 175 of the 193 countries with UN membership employ a VAT, including all OECD members except the United States.

== History ==
German industrialist Georg Wilhelm von Siemens proposed the concept of a value-added tax in 1918 to replace the German turnover tax. However, the turnover tax was not replaced until 1968. The modern variation of VAT was first implemented by Maurice Lauré, joint director of the French tax authority, who implemented VAT on 10 April 1954 in France's Ivory Coast colony. Assessing the experiment as successful, France introduced it domestically in 1958. Initially directed at large businesses, it was extended over time to include all business sectors. In France it is the largest source of state finance, accounting for nearly 50% of state revenues.

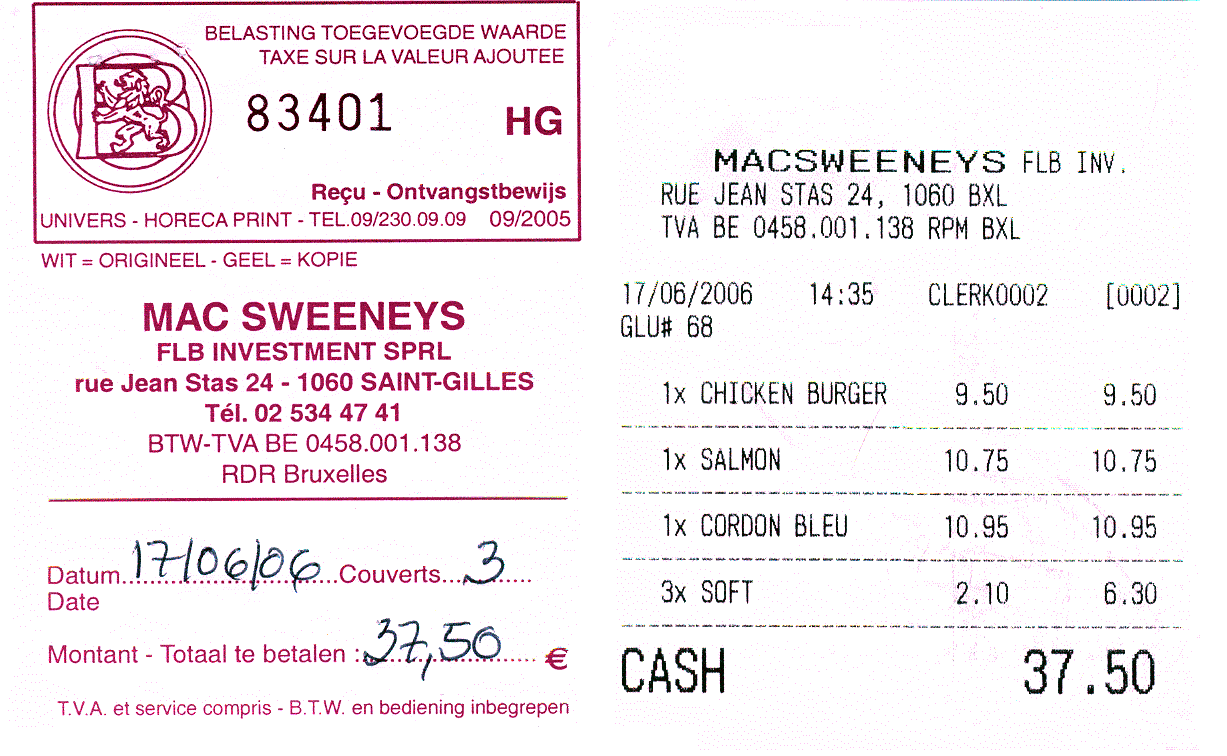
A Belgian VAT receipt

Following creation of the European Economic Community in 1957, the Fiscal and Financial Committee set up by the European Commission in 1960 under the chairmanship of Professor Fritz Neumark made its priority objective the elimination of distortions to competition caused by disparities in national indirect tax systems.

The Neumark Report published in 1962 concluded that France's VAT model would be the simplest and most effective indirect tax system. This led to the EEC issuing two VAT directives, adopted in April 1967, providing a blueprint for introducing VAT across the EEC, following which, other member states (initially Belgium, Italy, Luxembourg, the Netherlands and West Germany) introduced VAT.

== Implementation ==
VAT can be accounts-based or invoice-based. All VAT-collecting countries except Japan use the invoice method.

Using invoices, each seller pays VAT on their sales and passes the buyer an invoice that indicates the amount of tax paid excluding deductions (input tax). Buyers who themselves add value and resell the product pay VAT on their own sales (output tax). The difference between output tax and input tax is the amount paid to the government (or refunded, in the case of a negative amount).

Using accounts, the tax is calculated as a percentage of the difference between sales and purchases from taxed accounts.

== Incentives ==
VAT provides an incentive for businesses to register and keep invoices, and it does this in the form of zero-rated goods and VAT exemption on goods not resold. Through registration, a business documents its purchases, making them eligible for a VAT credit.

The main benefits of VAT are that in relation to many other forms of taxation, it does not distort firms' production decisions, it is difficult to evade, and it generates a substantial amount of revenue.

== Comparison with sales tax ==
Three examples below demonstrate the chain of transactions between the raw materials producer and the final consumer, in which

1. the government levies no tax
2. the government levies sales tax
3. the government levies a Value-Added Tax.

Example 1: Untaxed
| A manufacturer spends $1.00 on raw materials and uses them to make a widget.; The manufacturer sells the widget to a retailer for $1.20 (Gross margin: $0.20); The retailer sells the widget to an end consumer for $1.50 (Gross margin: $0.30) |

Example 2: 10% sales tax
| The raw materials producer sells $1 of raw materials for a widget to a manufacturer, checking that the buyer is not an end consumer; The manufacturer sells a widget to a retailer for $1.20, checking that the buyer is not an end consumer (Tax paid: $0, Gross margin: $0.20); The retailer sells the widget to a consumer ($1.50 × 1.10) = $1.65 (Tax paid: $.15, Gross margin: $0.30) |
The end consumer pays 10% ($0.15) extra, compared to the no taxation scheme, and the government collects this amount.; The retailer pays no tax directly, but the retailer has to do the tax-related paperwork.; Suppliers and manufacturers have the administrative burden of providing correct state exemption certifications that the retailer must verify and maintain.; The manufacturer is responsible for ensuring that their buyers are only intermediates and not end consumers (otherwise the manufacturer charges the tax).; The retailer tracks what is taxable and what is not, along with the various tax rates in each location where it operates.

Example 3: 10% Value-Added Tax
| The raw materials producer sells $1 of raw materials for a widget to a manufacturer for ($1 × 1.10) = $1.10. (Tax paid: $0.10); The manufacturer sells a widget to a retailer for ($1.20 × 1.10) = $1.32 (Tax paid: $0.12 - $0.10 = $0.02, Gross margin: $1.32 – $1.10 – $0.02 = $0.20); The retailer sells a widget to a consumer for ($1.50 × 1.10) = $1.65 (Tax paid: $0.15 minus $0.12) = $0.03, Gross margin: $1.65 – $1.32 – $0.03 = $0.30) |
The taxes paid by both the manufacturer and the retailer to the government are 10% of the values added by their respective business practices, i.e. the 10% of the difference between their buying price and selling price. For example, the value added by the manufacturer is $1.20 minus $1.00 = $0.20. The manufacturer pays 10% of $.20 = $0.02.; The consumer has paid, and the government received, the same dollar amount as with a sales tax. The gross margins, in dollar amount, remain the same as with a sales tax. The end consumer pays the same final price as with a sales tax.; At each stage of production, the seller collects a tax and the buyer pays that tax. The buyer can then be reimbursed for paying the tax, but only by successfully selling the value-added product to the buyer at the next stage. If the retailer fails to sell some of its inventory, it suffers a greater financial loss in the VAT scheme, in comparison to the sales tax regulatory system, by having paid a higher price for the product it failed to sell.; The gross margins of the manufacturer and retailer are a smaller percent of the total perspective. If the cost of raw material production were shown, this would also be true of the raw material supplier's gross margin on a percentage basis.; Each business is responsible for handling the necessary tax paperwork, and incur the increased accounting costs for collecting the tax. However, businesses have no obligation to request certifications from intermediate purchasers (who are not end consumers), or to provide such certifications to their suppliers.

=== Compliance ===
One primary reason for the institution of a VAT versus sales tax is to ensure compliance. Because sales tax is only submitted at the final sale to the consumer, the government has little information to verify that a sale has been made or at what price, making enforcement difficult. The retailer and consumer have an incentive to evade the tax with little risk of discovery. With any transaction, the seller is financially motivated to assume the buyer is an intermediate, not a consumer (and therefore, not subject to the sales tax), even if this may result in illegal tax evasion.

By comparison, with VAT every transaction is reported to the government (either through a submission of tax, a reimbursement claim, or both), a trail of information is created for government which helps motivate compliance and facilitate any potential audit. The materials producer, manufacturer, and retailer all know that the others down the chain will submit reimbursement claims, so a failure to report the transaction and pay the tax is likely to draw attention from authorities. Even if retailers evade charging the VAT from the consumer, the government still receives the income at prior stages.

On the contrary, if a seller accidentally charges sales tax to an intermediate buyer, the end price to the consumer will increase.

=== Business structure ===
VAT has no effect on how businesses organize, because the same amount of tax is collected regardless of how many times goods change hands before arriving at the ultimate consumer. By contrast, sales taxes, when collected on intermediate transactions in addition to final consumption, encourage businesses to vertically integrate to reduce the number of transactions and thereby reduce the amount of tax paid.

Because of the difficulty of exempting intermediate transactions in a sales tax, VAT has been gaining favor over traditional sales taxes.

However, it is uncommon for sales taxes to be collected at every stage, as it is only levied as a final tax on the consumer, not the reseller.

=== Governance structure ===
VAT is collected at the national level. In countries such as India and the United States, sales tax is collected at the point of sale by the local jurisdiction, leading them to prefer the latter method.

=== Accounting ===
The main disadvantage of VAT is the extra accounting required by those in the supply chain. However, payment of VAT is made simpler when the VAT system has few, if any, exemptions (such as with GST in New Zealand).

== Effects ==
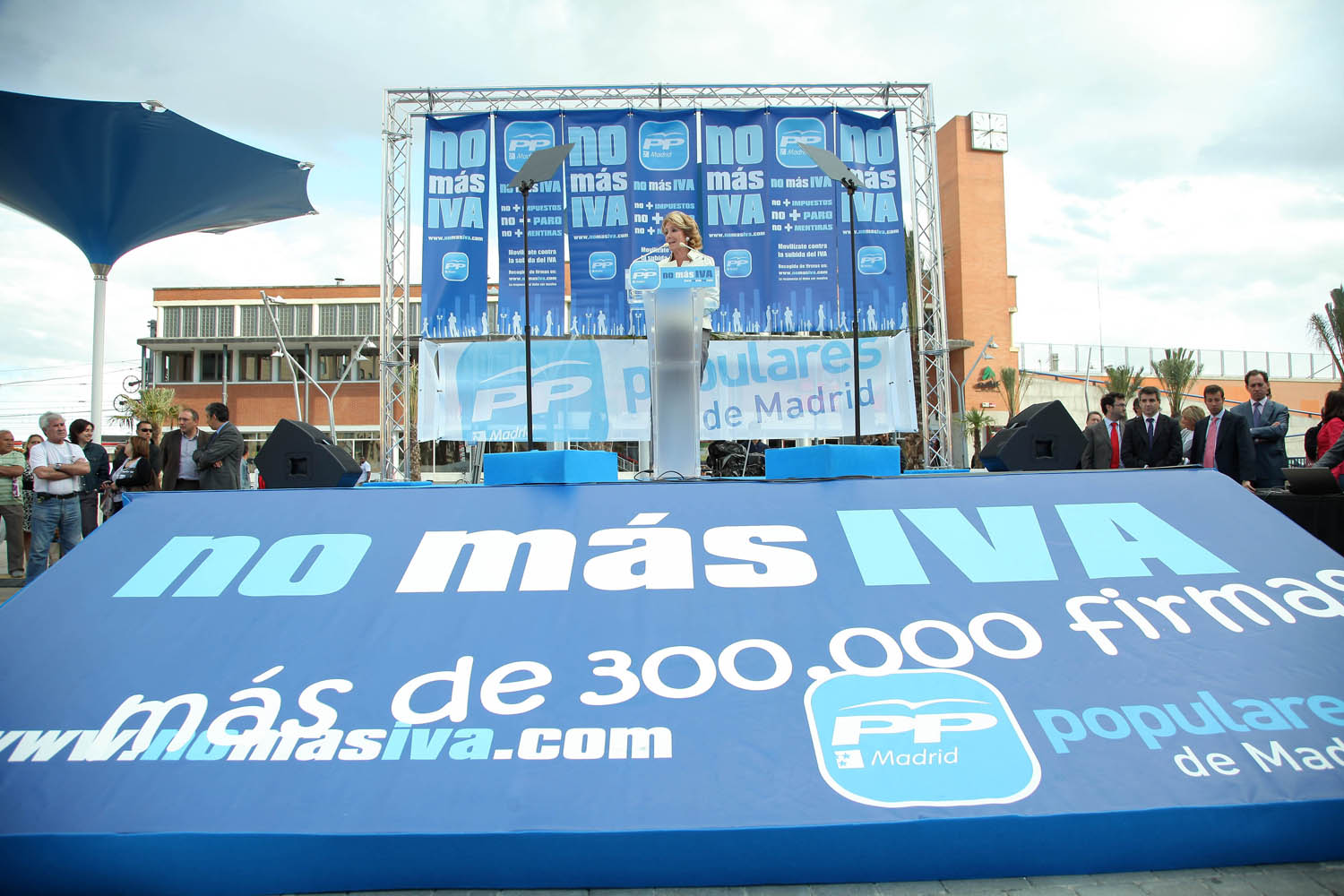
4 May 2010 "Campaña no más IVA" in Spain

=== Regressivity ===
VAT has been criticized by opponents as a regressive tax, meaning that the poor pay more, as a percentage of their income, relative to the wealthier individuals, given the higher marginal propensity to consume among the poor.

Defenders reply that relating taxation levels to income is an arbitrary standard and that the VAT is in fact a proportional tax. An OECD study found that VAT could even be slightly progressive. VAT's effective regressivity can be reduced by applying a lower rate to products that are more likely to be consumed by the poor. Some countries compensate by implementing transfer payments targeted to the poor.

=== Deadweight loss ===
The incidence of VAT may not fall entirely on consumers as traders tend to absorb VAT so as to maintain sales volumes. Conversely, not all cuts in VAT are passed on in lower prices. VAT consequently leads to a deadweight loss if cutting prices pushes a business below the margin of profitability. The effect can be seen when VAT is cut or abolished. Sweden reduced VAT on restaurant meals from 25% to 12%, creating 11,000 additional jobs.

=== Churning ===
Because VAT is included in the price index to which state benefits such as pensions and welfare payments are linked in some countries, as well as public sector pay, some of the apparent revenue is churned – i.e. taxpayers are given the money to pay the tax, reducing net revenue.

=== Business cashflow ===
Refund delays by the tax administration can damage businesses.

=== Compliance costs ===
Compliance costs are seen as a burden on business. In the UK, compliance costs for VAT have been estimated to be about 4% of the yield, with greater impacts on smaller businesses.

Under a sales tax system, only businesses selling to the end-user are required to collect tax and bear the accounting cost of collecting the tax. Under VAT, manufacturers and wholesale companies also incur accounting expenses to handle the additional paperwork required for collecting VAT, increasing overhead costs and prices.

=== Fraud ===
VAT offers distinctive opportunities for evasion and fraud, especially through abuse of the credit and refund mechanism. VAT overclaim fraud reached as high as 34% in Romania.

Exports are generally zero-rated, creating opportunity for fraud. In Europe, the main source of problems is carousel fraud. This fraud originated in the 1970s in the Benelux countries. VAT fraud then became a major problem in the UK. Similar fraud possibilities exist inside a country. To avoid this, countries such as Sweden hold the major owner of a limited company personally responsible.

=== Trade effects ===
If a county's exported goods are exempt from domestic VAT (zero-rated) or VAT rebated, this can motivate an increase in the export of goods.

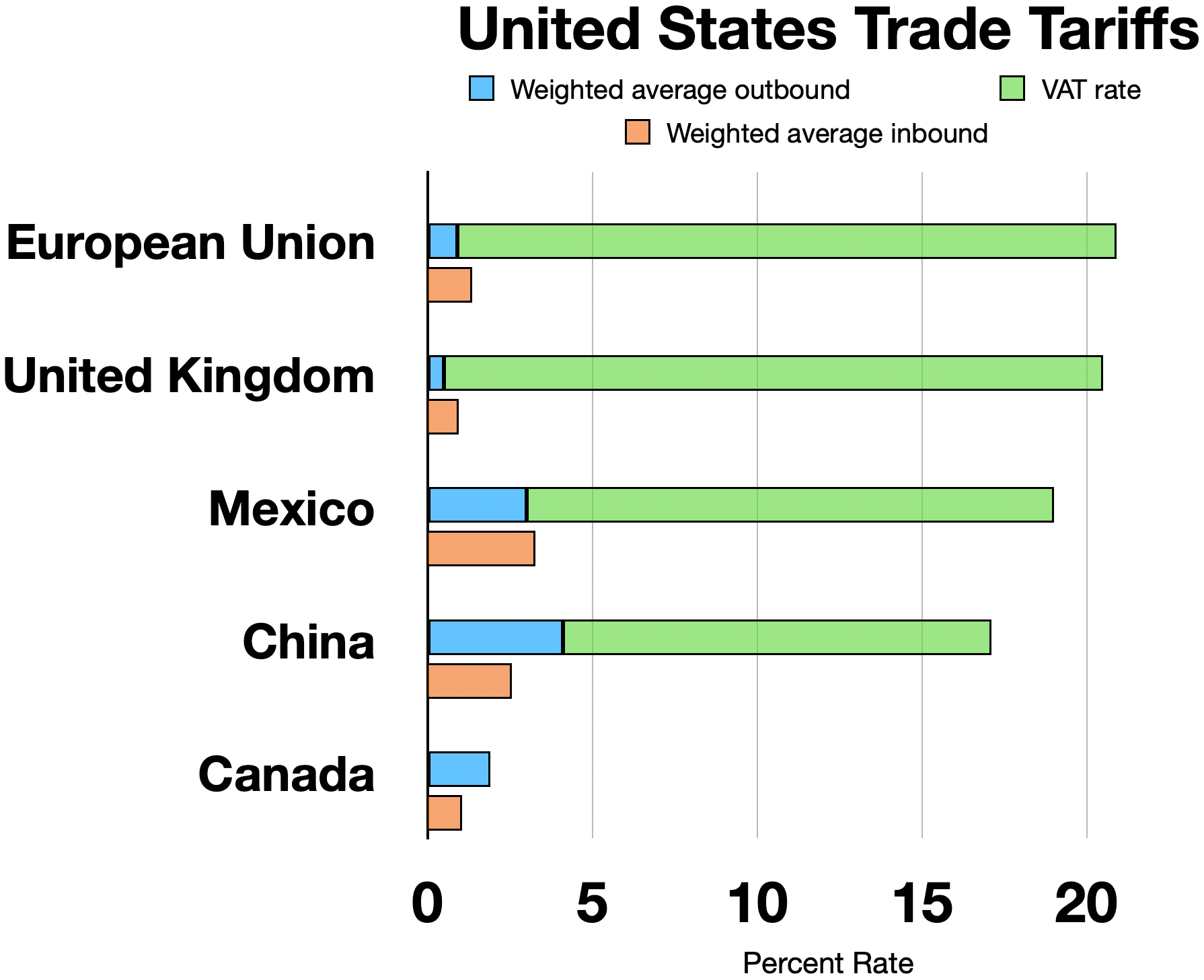
US trade tariffs with major trading partners

A country's national VAT may be seen as a tariff on imported goods. The American Manufacturing Trade Action Coalition in the United States considers VAT charges on US products when VAT rebates are offered for products from other countries to be an unfair trade practice. AMTAC claims that so-called "border tax disadvantage" is the greatest contributing factor to the US current account deficit, and estimated this disadvantage to US producers and service providers to be $518 billion in 2008 alone. US politicians such as congressman Bill Pascrell advocate either changing WTO rules relating to VAT or rebating VAT charged on US exporters.

A business tax rebate for exports was proposed in the 2016 GOP tax reform policy paper. The assertion that this "border adjustment" would be compatible with the rules of the WTO is controversial; it was alleged that the proposed tax would favour domestically produced goods as they would be taxed less than imports, to a degree varying across sectors. For example, the wage component of the cost of domestically produced goods would not be taxed.

A 2021 study reported that value-added taxes within the EU were unlikely to distort trade flows.

== Around the world ==
Standard VAT rate by country No VAT ~5% ~10% ~15% ~20% ~25%

=== Armenia ===
The VAT rate is 20%. However, the expanded application is zero VAT for many operations and transactions. That zero VAT is the source of controversies between its trading partners, mainly Russia, which is against the zero VAT and promotes wider use of tax credits. VAT is replaced with fixed payments, which are utilized for many taxpayers, operations, and transactions. Legislation is based largely on the EU VAT Directive's principles.

The system is input-output based. Producers are allowed to subtract VAT on their inputs from the VAT they charge on their outputs and report the difference. VAT is purchased quarterly. An exception occurs for taxpayers who state monthly payments. VAT is disbursed to the state's budget on the 20th day of the month after the tax period. The law took effect on 1 January 2022.

=== Australia ===
The goods and services tax (GST) is a VAT introduced in Australia in 2000. Revenue is redistributed to the states and territories via the Commonwealth Grants Commission process. This works as a program of horizontal fiscal equalisation. The rate is set at 10%, although many domestically consumed items are effectively zero-rated (GST-free) such as fresh food, education, health services, certain medical products, as well as government charges and fees that are effectively taxes.

=== Bangladesh ===
VAT was introduced in 1991, replacing sales tax and most excise duties. The Value Added Tax Act, 1991 triggered VAT starting on 10 July 1991, which is observed as National VAT Day. VAT became the largest source of government revenue, totaling about 56%. The standard rate is 15%. Export is zero rated. Several reduced rates, locally called Truncated Rates, apply to service sectors and range from 1.5% to 10%. The Value Added Tax and Supplementary Duty Act of 2012 automated administration.

The National Board of Revenue (NBR) administers VAT. Other rules and acts include Development Surcharge and Levy (Imposition and Collection) Act, 2015; and Value Added Tax and Supplementary Duty Rules, 2016. Anyone who collects VAT becomes a VAT Trustee if they: register and collect a Business Identification Number (BIN) from the NBR; submit VAT returns on time; offer VAT receipts; store all cash-memos; and use the VAT rebate system responsibly. VAT Mentors work in the VAT or Customs department and deal with trustees. The VAT rate is a flat 15%.

=== Barbados ===
VAT was introduced on 1 January 1997 and replaced 11 other taxes. The original rate of 15% was increased to 17.5% in 2011. The rate on restaurant and hotel accommodations is between 10% and 15% while certain foods and goods are zero-rated. The revenue is collected by the Barbados Revenue Authority.

=== Bulgaria ===
VAT was 20% as of 2023. A reduced rate of 9% applies to baby foods and hygiene products, as well as on books. A permanent rate of 9% applies to physical or electronic periodicals, such as newspapers and magazines.

=== Canada ===
Goods and Services Tax (GST) is a national sales tax introduced in 1991 at a rate of 7%, later reduced to 5%. A Harmonized Sales Tax (HST) that combines the GST and provincial sales tax, is collected in New Brunswick (15%), Newfoundland (15%), Nova Scotia (14%), Ontario (13%) and Prince Edward Island (15%), while British Columbia had a 12% HST until 2013. Quebec has a de facto 14.975% HST: it follows the same rules as the GST, and both are collected by Revenu Québec.

Advertised and posted prices generally exclude taxes, which are calculated at the time of payment; common exceptions are motor fuels, the posted prices for which include sales and excise taxes, and items in vending machines as well as alcohol in monopoly stores. Basic groceries, prescription drugs, inward/outbound transportation and medical devices are zero-rated. Other provinces that do not have a HST may have a Provincial Sales Tax (PST), which are collected in British Columbia (7%), Manitoba (7%) and Saskatchewan (6%). Alberta and all three territories do not collect either an HST or a PST.

=== Chile ===
VAT was introduced in Chile in 1974 under Decreto Ley 825. From 1998 there was implemented a 18% tax. Since October 2003, the standard VAT rate has been 19%, applying to the majority of goods and some services. However certain items have been subjected to additional tax, for instance, alcoholic beverages (between 20.5–31.5% for fermented to distilled products), jewellery (15%), pyrotechnic items (50% or more for the first sale or import) or soft drinks with high sugar (18%). As of 2023, the VAT tax includes majority of services excluding Education, Health and Transport, as well as taxpayers issuing fee receipts. This tax makes the 41.2% of the total revenue of the country.

=== China ===
VAT produces the largest share of China's tax revenue. In 2019, VAT accounted for 40% of the total tax revenue.

In 1984 the State Council announced that China would begin collecting VAT. For a decade, it was imposed only on certain categories of goods and at differing rates. In 1994, VAT became universally imposed on production, wholesale, retain, and importation of all goods.

In 2016, business tax was replaced with VAT nationwide. VAT's significance to China's tax revenues increased drastically after this.

=== Czech Republic ===
In 1993, a standard rate of 23% and a reduced rate of 5% for non-alcoholic beverages, sewerage, heat, and public transport was introduced. In 2015, rates were revised to 21% for the standard rate, and 15% and 10% reduced rates. The lowest reduced rate primarily targeted baby food, medicines, vaccines, books, and music shops, while maintaining a similar redistribution of goods and services for the other rates.

In 2024, a law aimed at reducing the national debt featured return to two rates: a standard rate of 21% and a reduced rate of 12%. Goods and services were redistributed among different tax rates.

There was only one service that shifted from the standard rate to the reduced rate and that was non-regular land passenger bus services. These are not taxi services, which apply a VAT rate of 21%. Books and printed materials, including electronic books, were zero rated.

Several services were moved from reduced rates to the standard rate. Examples include hairdressers and barbers, bicycle repairs, footwear and clothing repairs, freelance journalists and models, cleaning services, and municipal waste.

=== European Union ===
The European Union VAT is mandatory for member states of the European Union. The EU VAT asks where supply and consumption occurs, which determines which state collects VAT and at what rate.

Each state must comply with EU VAT law, which requires a minimum standard rate of 15% and one or two reduced rates not to be below 5%. Some EU members have a 0% VAT rate on certain items; these states agreed this as part of their accession (for example, newspapers and certain magazines in Belgium). Certain goods and services must be exempt from VAT (for example, postal services, medical care, lending, insurance, betting), and certain other items are exempt from VAT by default, but states may opt to charge VAT on them (such as land and certain financial services). Luxembourg charges the lowest rate, 17%, and Hungary charges the highest rate, 27%. Only Denmark has no reduced rate.

=== Gulf Cooperation Council ===
The United Arab Emirates (UAE) on 1 January 2018 implemented VAT. For companies whose annual revenues exceed $102,000 (Dhs 375,000), registration is mandatory. GCC countries agreed to an introductory rate of 5%. Saudi Arabia's VAT system uses a 15% rate.

=== Hungary ===
Hungary's standard VAT rate is 27%, the highest in the European Union. Lower rates of 18%, 5%, and 0% apply to certain goods and services.

=== India ===
VAT was introduced on 1 April 2005. Of the then 28 states, eight did not immediately introduce VAT. Rates were 5% and 14.5%. Tamil Nadu introduced VAT on 1 January 2007. Under the BJP government, it was replaced by a national Goods and Services Tax (GST) according to the One Hundred and First Amendment of the Constitution of India.

=== Iran (Islamic Republic Of) ===
Under the Iranian Islamic Resistive economy VAT is universally collected, paid twice 12% by consumer at Point of sale terminals purchases and also by the producers/manufacturers paid electronically at once, around 2% of government VAT profit goes to food electronic coupon stamps National Credit Network program, during Iranian economic crisis in December 2025 in the 2026 fiscal budget it was raised by 3%.

=== Indonesia ===
Per 1 January 2025, maximum Goods and Services Tax (GST) is levied at the rate of 12% at point of sale. Sales and services tax are exempt from cottage economies and industries.

A VAT rate of zero percent is applied to the following taxable events:

- export for taxable goods
- export for intangible taxable goods
- export for taxable services

VAT base on equivalent to the sale price/service fee or import/export value.

=== Italy ===
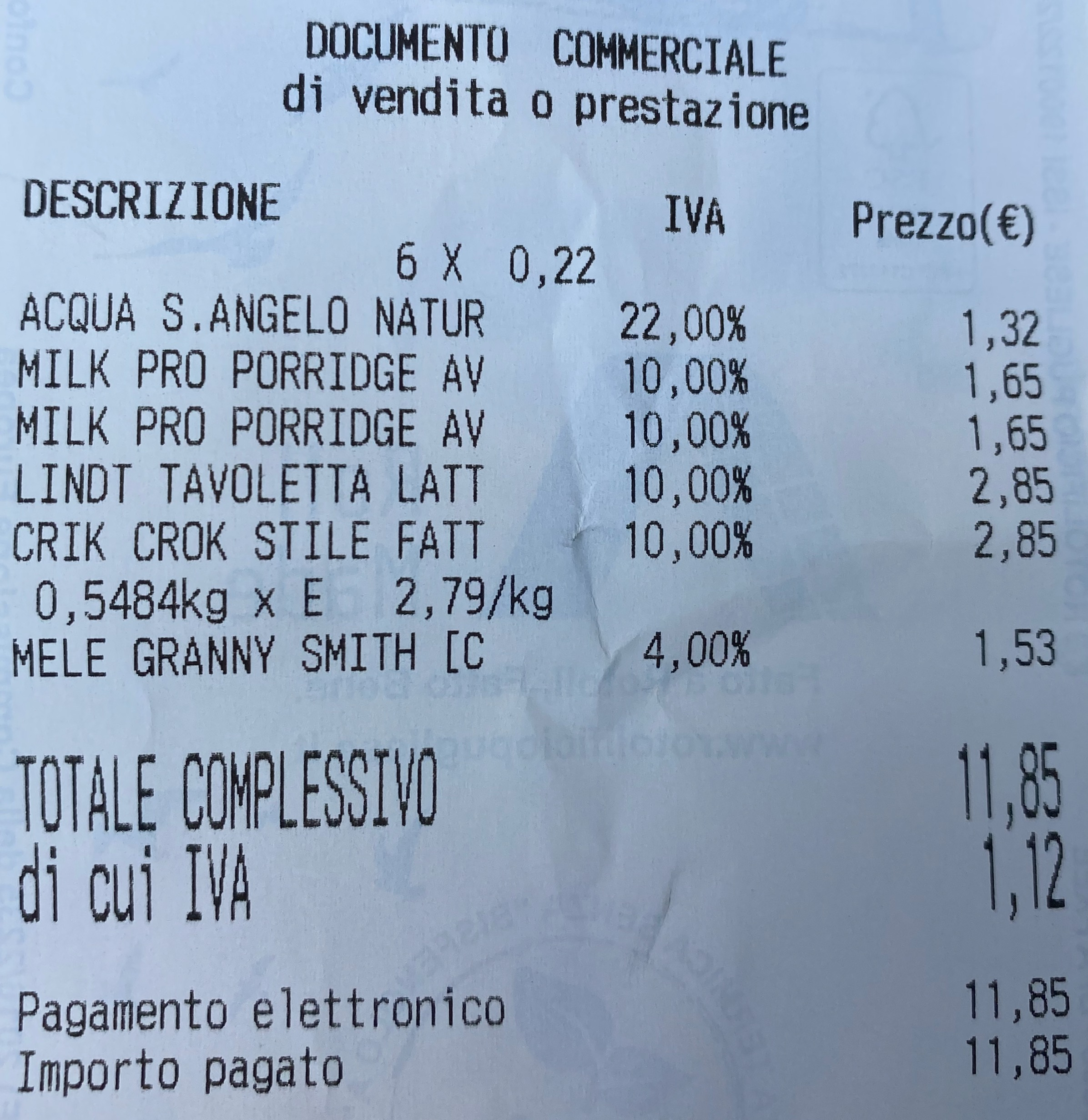
Supermarket receipt showing three categories of IVA

Value added tax or VAT, (in Italian Imposta sul valore aggiunto, or IVA) is a consumption tax charged at a standard rate of 22 percent, which came in on 1 July 2013 (previously 21 percent).

The first reduced VAT rate (10 percent) applies to water supplies, passenger transport, admission to cultural and sports events, hotels, restaurants and some foodstuff. The second reduced VAT rate (5 percent) applies to some foodstuff and social services. The super-reduced VAT rate (4 percent) applies to TV licenses, newspapers, periodicals, books and medical equipment for the disabled. A zero VAT rate (0 percent) applies to intra-community and international transport.

The filing deadline for VAT returns is 30 April of the next year.

=== Israel ===
Value-added tax (VAT) in Israel, is applied to most goods and services, including imported goods and services. From 1 January 2025 the standard rate was increased to 18% from 17%. It had been decreased to 17% from 18% on 1 October 2015. It had been raised from 16% to 17% on 1 September 2012, and to 18% on 2 June 2013.

Certain items, such as exported goods and the provision of certain services to non-residents are zero-rated. VAT on imported goods is levied on value plus customs duty, purchase tax and other levies.

Multinational companies that provide services to Israel through the Internet, such as Google and Facebook, must pay VAT.

Electronic filing of VAT is mandatory.

=== Japan ===
VAT, referred to as consumption tax, was implemented in Japan in 1989. Tax authorities debated VAT in the 1960s and 1970s but decided against it at the time.

The standard rate is 10%. Food, beverages, newspaper subscriptions with certain criteria and other necessities qualify for a rate of 8%. Transactions including land sales or lease, securities sales and the provision of public services are exempt.

=== Malaysia ===
The Goods and Services Tax (GST) is an abolished value-added tax in Malaysia. GST is levied on most transactions in the production process, but is refunded with exception of Blocked Input Tax, to all parties in the chain of production other than the final consumer.

The existing standard rate for GST effective from 1 April 2015 is 6%. Many domestically consumed items such as fresh foods, water and electricity are zero-rated, while some supplies such as education and health services are GST exempted.

After Pakatan Harapan won the 2018 Malaysian general election, GST was reduced to 0% on 1 June 2018. The then Government of Malaysia tabled the first reading of the Bill to repeal GST in Parliament on 31 July 2018 (Dewan Rakyat). GST was replaced with the Sales Tax and Service Tax starting 1 September 2018.

=== Mexico ===
The existing sales tax (Spanish: impuesto a las ventas) was replaced by VAT (Spanish: Impuesto al Valor Agregado, IVA) on 1 January 1980. As of 2010, the general VAT rate was 16%. This rate was applied all over Mexico except for border regions (i.e. the United States border, or Belize and Guatemala), where the rate was 11%. Books, food, and medicines are zero-rated. Some services such as medical care are zero-rated. In 2014 the favorable tax rate for border regions was eliminated and the rate increased to 16% across the country.

=== Nepal ===
Value Added Tax (VAT) is an indirect tax levied on the value creation or addition. The concept of VAT in Nepal was introduced in FY 2049/50 but the act was developed in BS 2050. VAT was implemented in 1998 and is the major source of government revenue. It is administered by the Inland Revenue Department of Nepal.

=== New Zealand ===
Goods and Services Tax (GST; Māori: Tāke hokohoko) is a value-added tax or consumption tax for goods and services consumed in New Zealand.

GST in New Zealand is designed to be a broad-based system with few exemptions, such as for rents collected on residential rental properties, donations, precious metals and financial services. It normally makes up around 30% of tax revenue in New Zealand.

The rate for GST, effective since 1 October 2010 is 15%. This 15% tax is applied to the final price of the product or service being purchased and goods and services are advertised as GST inclusive. Reduced rate GST (9%) applies to hotel accommodation on a long-term basis (longer than 4 weeks). Zero rate GST (0%) applies to exports and related services; land transactions; international transportation. Financial services, real estate and precious metals are also exempt.

=== Nordic countries ===
MOMS (Danish: merværdiafgift, formerly meromsætningsafgift), Norwegian: merverdiavgift (bokmål) or meirverdiavgift (nynorsk) (abbreviated MVA), Swedish: Mervärdes- och OMSättningsskatt (until the early 1970s labeled as OMS OMSättningsskatt only), Icelandic: virðisaukaskattur (abbreviated VSK), Faroese: meirvirðisgjald (abbreviated MVG) or Finnish: arvonlisävero (abbreviated ALV) are the Nordic terms for VAT. Like other countries' sales and VAT, it is an indirect tax.

| Year | Tax level (Denmark) | Name |
| 1962 | 9% | OMS |
| 1967 | 10% | MOMS |
| 1968 | 12.5658% | MOMS |
| 1970 | 15% | MOMS |
| 1977 | 18% | MOMS |
| 1978 | 20.25% | MOMS |
| 1980 | 22% | MOMS |
| 1992 | 25% | MOMS |

Denmark has the highest VAT, alongside Norway, Sweden, and Croatia. VAT is generally applied at one rate, 25%, with few exceptions. Services such as public transport, health care, newspapers, rent (the lessor can voluntarily register as a VAT payer, except for residential premises), and travel agencies.

In Finland, the standard rate is 25.5%. A 14% rate is applied on groceries, animal feed, and restaurant and catering services. A 10% rate is applied on books, newspapers and magazines, pharmaceutical products, sports and fitness services, entrance fees to cultural, entertainment and sporting events, passenger transport services, accommodation services, and royalties for television and public radio activities. Åland, an autonomous area, is considered to be outside the EU VAT area, although its VAT rate is the same as for Finland. Goods brought from Åland to Finland or other EU countries are considered to be imports. This enables tax-free sales onboard passenger ships.

In Iceland, VAT is 24% for most goods and services. An 11% rate is applied for hotel and guesthouse stays, licence fees for radio stations (namely RÚV), newspapers and magazines, books; hot water, electricity and oil for heating houses, food for human consumption (but not alcoholic beverages), access to toll roads and music.

In Norway, the general rate is 25%, 15% on foodstuffs, and 12% on hotels and holiday homes, on some transport services, cinemas. Financial services, health services, social services and educational services, newspapers, books and periodicals are zero-rated. Svalbard has no VAT because of a clause in the Svalbard Treaty.

In Sweden, VAT is 25% for most goods and services, 12% for foods including restaurants, and hotels. It is 6% for printed matter, cultural services, and transport of private persons. Zero-rated services including public (but not private) education, health, dental care. Dance event tickets are 25%, concerts and stage shows are 6%, while some types of cultural events are 0%.

MOMS replaced OMS (Danish omsætningsafgift, Swedish omsättningsskatt) in 1967, which was a tax applied exclusively for retailers.

=== Philippines ===
The standard value-added tax (VAT) rate since 2006 is 12%, when Republic Act No. 9337 came into effect; previously, it had been 10% when it was first introduced by president Corazon Aquino in 1988 upon issuing Executive Order No. 273.

In 2018, the VAT threshold of annual sales was changed from ₱1,919,500 to ₱3,000,000 as a result of the passage of the Tax Reform for Inclusion and Acceleration (TRAIN) Law.

=== Poland ===
VAT was introduced in 1993. The standard rate is 23%. Items and services eligible for an 8% include certain food products, newspapers, goods and services related to agriculture, medicine, sport, and culture. The complete list is in Annex 3 to the VAT Act. A 5% applies to basic food items (such as meat, fruits, vegetables, dairy and bakery products), children's items, hygiene products, and books. Exported goods, international transport services, supply of specific computer hardware to educational institutions, vessels, and air transport are zero rated. Taxi services have flat-rate tax of 4%. Flat-rate farmers supplying agricultural goods to VAT taxable entities are eligible for a 7% refund.

=== Romania ===
Value-added tax (in Romanian Taxa pe valoarea adăugată, or TVA) in Romania is a consumption tax charged at a standard rate of 21%. A single reduced rate of 11% applies to most foodstuffs (alcoholic beverages excluded) and utilities.

=== Russia ===
The VAT rate is 20% with exemptions for some services (for example, medical care). VAT payers include organizations (industrial and financial, state and municipal enterprises, institutions, business partnerships, insurance companies and banks), enterprises with foreign investments, individual entrepreneurs, international associations, and foreign entities with operations in the Russian Federation, non-commercial organizations that conduct commercial activities, and those who move goods across the border of the Customs Union.

In September 2025 MinFin proposed to raise the VAT rate from 20% to 22% for 2026.

=== Singapore ===
Goods and Services Tax (GST) in Singapore is 9% levied on local sales, import of goods, as well as most supplies of goods and services. Exemptions are given for the sales and leases of residential properties, importation and local supply of investment precious metals and most financial services. Export of goods and international services are zero-rated. GST is also absorbed by the government for public healthcare services, such as at public hospitals and polyclinics.

=== Slovakia ===
The standard rate is 23%. A 5% rate primarily applies to essential goods such as (healthy) food, medicine, and books.

=== Spain ===
VAT (IVA in Spanish: impuesto sobre el valor añadido or impuesto sobre el valor agregado) is due on any supply of goods or services sold in Spain (mainland Spain and Balearic Islands only). The current normal rate is 21% which applies to all goods which do not qualify for a reduced rate or are exempt. There are two lower rates of 10% and 4%. The 10% rate is payable on most drinks, hotel services, and cultural events. The 4% rate is payable on food, books and medicines. The Spanish African territories of Ceuta, Melilla and the Canary Islands have other taxes equivalent to the VAT, but with lower tax rates An EU directive means that all countries of the European Union have VAT. All exempt goods and services are listed below.

- Education provided by the state
- Tutoring
- Sporting services
- Cultural services
- Insurance
- Postal stamps
- Artists, writers, and composers

As of January 1, 2013, new properties are taxed at a reduced rate of 10%. Second-hand properties are not subject to VAT, but a transfer tax, known as Impuestos Sobre Transmisiones Patrimoniales or ITP. The tax is levied by the autonomous regional governments and therefore varies by region. The rate varies from 6% to 8%.

=== South Africa ===
South Africa applies a standard VAT rate of 15%, with specific zero-rated and exempt items; recent case law has clarified the treatment of certain entertainment expenses for VAT input claims.

The VAT component of the tax revenue SARS collected in 2017/18 can be further broken down into Domestic VAT and Imported VAT, as per the table below:

Breakdown of tax revenues on VAT 2017/18
| Type of tax | Amounts in Rands | Percentage of total |
|---|---|---|
| Domestic VAT | R 336.2 bn | 68.8% |
| Import VAT | R 152.8 bn | 31.2% |
| VAT Refunds | (R 191.0 bn) | -39.1% |
| Total | R 298 bn | 100% |

=== Switzerland and Liechtenstein ===
The value added tax (VAT; Mehrwertsteuer / Taxe sur la valeur ajoutée / Imposta sul valore aggiunto) is one of the Confederation's principal sources of funding. It is levied at a rate of 8.1 percent on most commercial exchanges of goods and services. Certain exchanges are subject to a reduced VAT of 2.6 percent:

- Foodstuffs (except alcoholic beverages)
- Cattle, poultry, fish
- Seeds, living plants, cut flowers
- Grains
- Animal feed and fertilizer
- Medications
- Newspapers, magazines, books and other printed products without advertising character of the kinds to be stipulated by the Federal Council
- Services of radio and television companies (exception: the normal rate applies for services of a commercial nature)

A special rate of 3.8% is in use in the hotel industry. Yet other exchanges, including those of medical, educational and cultural services, are tax-exempt; as are goods delivered and services provided abroad. The party providing the service or delivering the goods is liable for the payment of the VAT, but the tax is usually passed on to the customer as part of the price.

In 2014 total revenue from VAT was nearly CHF 11 billion (short scale) on CHF 866 billion of taxable sales. In 2013 the revenue and sales were CHF 10.3 billion and 858 billion respectively.

=== Taiwan ===
VAT in Taiwan is 5%. It is levied on all goods and services. Exceptions include exports, vessels, aircraft used in international transportation, and deep-sea fishing boats.

=== Trinidad and Tobago ===
VAT is 12.5%.

=== Ukraine ===
Value added tax is levied on the supply of goods and service in Ukraine and on the import and export of goods and auxiliary services. Supplies to and from Crimea are treated as exports and imports for value added tax purposes. The standard VAT rate is 20% for domestic supplies and imported goods (including auxiliary services). A 7% rate applies to supplies of pharmaceuticals and healthcare products. Exported goods and auxiliary services are zero-rated. For VAT purposes, services that are included in the customs value of imported and exported goods are considered auxiliary services. Certain supplies are not subject to VAT, including: issues of securities; insurance services; reorganization of legal entities; transfers and returns of property under operating lease arrangements; currency exchange; and imports and exports with a custom value of less than 150 EUR. VAT-exempt supplies include published periodicals; student notebooks, textbooks, books and certain educational services; certain public transport services; the provision of software products (until January 1. 2023); and the provision of healthcare services by licensed institutions. Registration is required (for residents and non-residents) if value of taxable supplies of goods or services exceeds ₴1 million during any 12-month period. A legal entity may apply for voluntary registration if it has no VAT-able activities or if the volume of its VAT-able transactions is less than the registration threshold. Although not specifically provided for in the Tax Code, in practice a nonresident entity must register for Ukrainian VAT purposes via representative office (RO) and/or permanent establishment (PE) in Ukraine.

=== United Kingdom ===
The United Kingdom introduced VAT in 1973 after joining the EEC. The current standard rate for VAT in the United Kingdom since 2011 is 20%. Some goods and services have a reduced rate of 5% or are zero-rated (0%). Others may be exempt.

=== United States ===
In the United States no federal VAT is in effect. Instead, sales and use taxes are used in most states. However, two states have enacted a form of VAT in lieu of a business income tax:

- Michigan used a form of VAT known as the "Single Business Tax" (SBT) from 1975 until voter-initiated legislation repealed it, replaced by the Michigan Business Tax in 2008.
- Hawaii has a 4% General Excise Tax (GET) that is charged on gross business income. Individual counties add a .5% surcharge. Unlike a VAT, rebates are not available, such that items incur the tax each time they are (re)sold.

Puerto Rico replaced its 6% sales tax with a 10.5% VAT beginning 1 April 2016, leaving in place its 1% municipal sales and use tax. Materials imported for manufacturing are exempt.

==== Discussions about a federal VAT ====
Former 2020 Democratic presidential candidate Andrew Yang advocated for a national VAT in order to pay for his universal basic income proposal. A national subtraction-method VAT, often referred to as a "flat tax", has been repeatedly proposed as a replacement of the corporate income tax.

A border-adjustment tax (BAT) was proposed by the Republican Party in 2016.

=== Vietnam ===
All organizations and individuals producing and trading VAT taxable goods and services pay VAT, regardless of whether they have Vietnam-resident establishments.

Vietnam has three VAT rates: 0 percent, 5 percent and 10 percent. 10 percent is the standard rate.

A variety of goods and service transactions qualify for VAT exemption.

== Tax rates ==
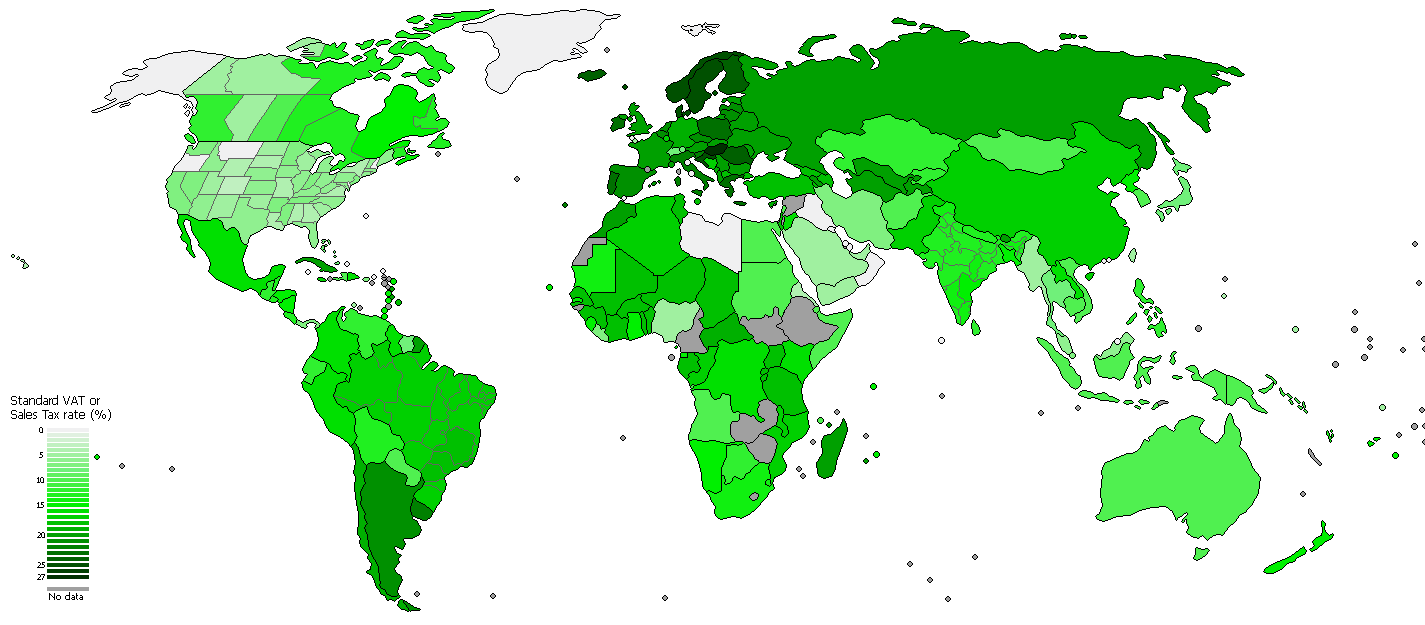
Standard VAT or sales tax rate

General government revenue, in % of GDP, from VAT. For this data, the variance of GDP per capita with purchasing power parity (PPP) is explained in 3% by tax revenue.

== Examples by continent ==
=== European Union countries ===
EU VAT Tax Rates

| Country | Standard rate (current) | Reduced rate (current) | Abbreviation | Local name |
|---|---|---|---|---|
| Austria | 20% | 10% for rental for the purpose of habitation, food, garbage collection, most transportation, etc. 13% for plants, live animals and animal food, art, wine (if bought directly from the winemaker), etc. | MwSt./USt. | MehrwertSteuer/UmsatzSteuer |
| Belgium | 21% | 12% or 6% (for food or live necessary consumables) or 0% in some cases | BTW; TVA; MwSt | Belasting over de Toegevoegde Waarde; Taxe sur la Valeur Ajoutée; MehrwertSteuer |
| Bulgaria | 20% | 9% (hotels) or 0% | ДДС | Данък Добавена Cтойност |
| Croatia | 25% | 13% (since 1 January 2014) or 5% (since 1 January 2013) | PDV | Porez na Dodanu Vrijednost |
| Cyprus | 19% | 5% (8% for taxi and bus transportation) | ΦΠΑ | Φόρος Προστιθέμενης Αξίας |
| Czech Republic | 21% | 15% (food, public transport) or 10% (medicines, pharmaceuticals, books and baby foodstuffs) | DPH | Daň z přidané hodnoty |
| Denmark | 25% | 0% | Moms | Meromsætningsafgift |
| Estonia | 24% | 9% | Km | Käibemaks |
| Finland | 25.5% | 14% (groceries, restaurants, medicines, cultural services and events, passenger transport, hotels, books) or 10% (newspapers and magazines ) | ALV; Moms | Arvonlisävero (Finnish); Mervärdesskatt (Swedish) |
| France | 20% | 10% or 5.5% or 2.1% | TVA | Taxe sur la Valeur Ajoutée |
| Germany | 19% (Heligoland 0%) | 7% for foodstuffs (except luxury-), books, flowers etc., 0% for postage stamps. (Heligoland always 0%) | MwSt./USt. | MehrwertSteuer/UmsatzSteuer |
| Greece | 24% (16% on Aegean islands) | 13% (6.5% for hotels, books and pharmaceutical products) (8% and 4% on Aegean islands) | ΦΠΑ | Φόρος Προστιθέμενης Αξίας |
| Hungary | 27% | 18% (milk and dairy products, cereal products, hotels, tickets to outdoor music events) or 5% (pharmaceutical products, medical equipment, books and periodicals, some meat products, district heating, heating based on renewable sources, live music performance under certain circumstances) or 0% (postal services, medical services, mother's milk, etc.) | áfa | Általános Forgalmi Adó |
| Ireland | 23% | 13.5% or 9.0% or 4.8% or 0% | CBl; VAT | Cáin Bhreisluacha (Irish); Value Added Tax (English) |
| Italy | 22% (Livigno 0%) | 10% (hotels, bars, restaurants and other tourism products, certain foodstuffs, plant protection products and special works of building restoration, home-use utilities: electricity, gas used for cooking and water) or 4% (e.g. grocery staples, daily or periodical press and books, works for the elimination of architectural barriers, some kinds of seeds, fertilizers) | IVA | Imposta sul Valore Aggiunto |
| Latvia | 21% | 12% or 0% | PVN | Pievienotās Vērtības Nodoklis |
| Lithuania | 21% | 9% or 5% | PVM | Pridėtinės Vertės Mokestis |
| Luxembourg | 17% | 14% on certain wines, 8% on public utilities, or 3% on books and press, food (including restaurant meals), children's clothing, hotel stays, and public transit | TVA; MwSt./USt; MS | Taxe sur la Valeur Ajoutée; Mehrwertsteuer/Umsatzsteuer; Méiwäert Steier |
| Malta | 18% | 7% or 5% or 0% | TVM; VAT | Taxxa tal-Valur Miżjud; Value Added Tax |
| Netherlands | 21% | 9% for special categories of products and services like food, medicine and art. 0% for products and services that are already taxed in other countries or systems, for excise goods, and for fish. | BTW/Ob | Belasting over de Toegevoegde Waarde/ Omzetbelasting/ Voorbelasting |
| Poland | 23% | 8% for beauty services, renovation and construction services, food services, food, tickets for public transportation (domestic connections). 5% for food, some agricultural products, medical services, cultural services, sports and recreation services. 0% for imported goods not covered by customs duties, tickets for public transportation (international connections) and services for repairing, processing or refining raw materials. | PTU | Podatek od Towarów i Usług |
| Portugal | 23% 22% in Madeira and 18% in Azores | 13% for processed food, provision of services, and others such as oil and diesel, climate action focused goods and musical instruments and 6% for food products, agricultural services, and other deemed essential products such as farmaceutical products and public transport 12% or 5% in Madeira and 9% or 4% in Azores | IVA | Imposto sobre o Valor Acrescentado |
| Romania | 19% | 9% (food and non-alcoholic drinks) or 5% (buyers of new homes under special conditions) | TVA | Taxa pe Valoarea Adăugată |
| Slovakia | 23% | 19% or 5% | DPH | Daň z Pridanej Hodnoty |
| Slovenia | 22% | 9.5% | DDV | Davek na Dodano Vrednost |
| Spain | 21% 7% in Canary Islands (not part of EU VAT area) | 10% (10% from 1 September 2012) or 4% 3% or 0% in Canary Islands | IVA; IGIC | Impuesto sobre el Valor Añadido; Impuesto General Indirecto Canario |
| Sweden | 25% | 12% (e.g. food, hotels and restaurants), 6% (e.g. books, passenger transport, cultural events and activities), 0% (e.g. insurance, financial services, health care, dental care, prescription drugs, immovable property) | MOMS | Mervärdes- och OMSättningsskatt |

=== Non-European Union countries ===
| Country | Standard rate (current) | Reduced rate (current) | Local name |
|---|---|---|---|
| Albania | 20% | 6% (accommodation services) or 0% (postal, medical, dental and welfare services) | TVSH = Tatimi mbi Vlerën e Shtuar |
| Algeria | 19% | The reduced VAT rate in Algeria is currently 9%. It applies to basic goods and services such as food, medicine, and transportation. | TVA = Taxe sur la Valeur Ajoutée (الضريبة على القيمة المضافة) |
| Andorra | 4.5% | 1% | IGI = Impost General Indirecte |
| Angola | 14% | 5% which applies to the import and supply of certain goods (products of the Basic Basket listed in Annex I of the VAT Code and agricultural inputs) | IVA = Imposto Sobre o Valor Acrescentado |
| Antigua and Barbuda | 15% | | ? |
| Argentina | 21% | 10.5% or 0% | IVA = Impuesto al Valor Agregado |
| Armenia | 20% | 0% | AAH = Avelacvats Arzheqi Hark; ԱԱՀ = Ավելացված արժեքի հարկ |
| Australia | 10% | 0% fresh food, medical services, medicines and medical devices, education services, childcare, water and sewerage, government taxes & permits and many government charges, precious metals, second-hand goods and many other types of goods. Rebates for exported goods and GST taxed business inputs are also available | GST = Goods and Services Tax |
| Azerbaijan | 18% | 10.5% or 0% | ƏDV = Əlavə dəyər vergisi |
| Bahamas | 12% | 12% or 0% (including but not limited to exports of goods or services, services to a foreign going vessel providing international commercial services, consumable goods for commercially scheduled foreign going vessels/aircraft, copyright, etc.) | VAT = Value Added Tax |
| Bahrain | 10% | 0% (pharmacies and medical services, road transport, education service, Oil and gas derivatives, Vegetables and fruits, National exports) | (VAT) ضريبة القيمة المضافة |
| Bangladesh | 15% | 4% for supplier, 4.5% for ITES, 5% for electricity, 5.5% for construction firm, etc. | Musok = Mullo songzojon kor মূসক = "মূল্য সংযোজন কর" |
| Barbados | 17.5% | | VAT = Value Added Tax |
| Belarus | 20% | 10% or 0.5% | ПДВ = Падатак на дададзеную вартасьць |
| Belize | 12.5% | | ? |
| Benin | 18% | | ? |
| Bolivia | 13% | | IVA = Impuesto al Valor Agregado |
| Bosnia and Herzegovina | 17% | | PDV = Porez na dodanu vrijednost |
| Botswana | 14% | | ? |
| Brazil | 20% (IPI) + 19% (ICMS) average + 3% (ISS) average | 0% | *IPI – 20% = Imposto sobre produtos industrializados (Tax over industrialized products) – Federal Tax; ICMS – 17 to 25% = Imposto sobre circulação e serviços (tax over commercialization and services) – State Tax; ISS – 2 to 5% = Imposto sobre serviço de qualquer natureza (tax over any service) – City tax |
| Burkina Faso | 18% | | ? |
| Burundi | 18% | | ? |
| Cambodia | 10% | | ? |
| Cameroon | 19.25% | | ? |
| Canada | 5% GST + 0–9.975% PST or 13-15% HST depending on province. | 0% (Note: No reduced rate, but rebates generally available for certain services) on GST or HST for Prescription drugs, medical devices, basic groceries, agricultural/fishing products, exported or foreign goods, services and travel. Other exemptions exist for PSTs and vary by province. | GST = Goods and Services Tax; TPS = Taxe sur les produits et services HST (Note: HST is a combined federal/provincial sales tax collected in some provinces. GST is a 5% federal sales tax collected separately if there is a PST. 5% of HSTs go to the federal government and the remainder to the province.) = Harmonized Sales Tax; PST = Provincial Sales Tax |
| Cape Verde | 15% | | ? |
| Central African Republic | 19% | | ? |
| Chad | 18% | | ? |
| Chile | 19% | | IVA = Impuesto al Valor Agregado |
| China (Note: These taxes do not apply in Hong Kong and Macau, which are financially independent and VAT-free as special administrative regions.) | 13% | 9% for foods, printed matter, and households fuels; 6% for service; or 3% for non-VAT | 增值税 (zēng zhí shuì) |
| Colombia | 19% | | IVA = Impuesto al Valor Agregado |
| Costa Rica | 13% | | IVA = Impuesto al Valor Agregado |
| Democratic Republic of the Congo | 16% | | ? |
| Dominica | 15% | | ? |
| Dominican Republic | 18% | 12% or 0% | ITBIS = Impuesto sobre Transferencia de Bienes Industrializados y Servicios |
| Ecuador | 15% | 0% | IVA = Impuesto al Valor Agregado |
| Egypt | 14% (15% on communication services) | | VAT = Value Added Tax (الضريبة على القيمة المضافة) |
| El Salvador | 13% | | IVA = Impuesto al Valor Agregado o "Impuesto a la Transferencia de Bienes Muebles y a la Prestación de Servicios" |
| Equatorial Guinea | 15% | | IVA = Impuesto sobre el Valor Añadido |
| Eswatini | 15% | | |
| Ethiopia | 15% | | VAT = Value Added Tax |
| Faroe Islands | 25% | | MVG = Meirvirðisgjald |
| Fiji | 15% | 0% | VAT = Value Added Tax |
| Gabon | 18% | | TVA = Taxe sur la Valeur Ajoutée |
| Gambia | 15% | | VAT = Value Added Tax |
| Georgia | 18% | 0% | DGhG = Damatebuli Ghirebulebis gadasakhadi დღგ = დამატებული ღირებულების გადასახადი |
| Ghana | 15% | | VAT = Value Added Tax plus National Health Insurance Levy (NHIL; 2.5%) |
| Grenada | 15% | | ? |
| Guatemala | 12% | | IVA = Impuesto al Valor Agregado |
| Guinea | 18% | | ? |
| Guinea-Bissau | 15% | | ? |
| Guyana | 16% | 0% | VAT = Value Added Tax |
| Haiti | 10% | | ? |
| Honduras | 15% (4% additional on tourism tax) | | ISV = Impuesto Sobre Ventas |
| Iceland | 24% | 11% (Note: The reduced rate was 14% until 1 March 2007, when it was lowered to 7%, and later changed to 11%. The reduced rate applies to heating costs, printed matter, restaurant bills, hotel stays, and most food.) | VSK, VASK = Virðisaukaskattur |
| India (Note: VAT is not implemented in 2 of India's 28 states.) | 18% | 5% | VAT = Value Added Tax |
| Indonesia | 12% | 12%, 0% for primary groceries, medical services, financial services, education and also insurance | PPN = Pajak Pertambahan Nilai |
| Iran | 9% | | VAT = Value Added Tax (مالیات بر ارزش افزوده) |
| Isle of Man | 20% | | ? |
| Israel (Note: Except Eilat, where VAT is not raised.) | 18% (Note: The VAT in Israel is in a state of flux. It was reduced from 18% to 17% in March 2004, to 16.5% in September 2005, then to 15.5% in July 2006. It was then raised back to 16.5% in July 2009, and lowered to the rate of 16% in January 2010. It was then raised again to 17% on 1 September 2012, and once again on 2 June 2013, to 18%. It was reduced from 18% to 17% in October 2015. And finally increased to 18% on 1 January 2025.) (0% in Eilat) | 0% (fruits and vegetables, tourism services for foreign citizens, intellectual property, diamonds, flights and apartments renting) | Ma'am = מס ערך מוסף, מע"מ |
| Ivory Coast | 18% | | ? |
| Jamaica | 15% | | GCT = General Consumption Tax |
| Japan | 10% | 8% (groceries, Subscription newspaper) | shōhizei (消費税) ("consumption tax") |
| Jersey (Note: The introduction of a goods and sales tax of 3% on 6 May 2008 was to replace revenue from Company Income Tax following a reduction in rates.) | 5% | 0% | GST = Goods and Services Tax |
| Jordan | 16% | | GST = Goods and Sales Tax |
| Kazakhstan | 12% | | ҚCҚ = Қосылған құнға салынатын салық (Kazakh); VAT = Value Added Tax |
| Kenya | 16% | | ? |
| Kyrgyzstan | 20% | | ? |
| Laos | 10% | | ? |
| Lebanon | 11% | | TVA = Taxe sur la Valeur Ajoutée (الضريبة على القيمة المضافة) |
| Lesotho | 14% | | ? |
| Liechtenstein | 8.1% | 3.8% (lodging services) or 2.6% | MWST = Mehrwertsteuer |
| Madagascar | 20% | | TVA =Taxe sur la Valeur Ajoutée, HASS = Hetra Amin'ny Sandan'ny Sandany |
| Malawi | 16.5% | | ? |
| Malaysia (Note: In the 2014 Budget, the government announced that GST would be introduced in April 2015. Piped water, power supply (the first 200 units per month for domestic consumers), transportation services, education, and health services are tax-exempt. However, many details have not yet been confirmed.) | 8% | 0% for fresh foods, education, healthcare, land public transportation and medicines. Sales and Services Tax (SST) was reintroduced by the Malaysian Government on 1 September 2018 to replace the Goods and Services Tax (GST) which had only been introduced just over three years before that, on 1 April 2015. | SST = Sales and Services Tax; CJP = Cukai Jualan dan Perkhidmatan GST = Goods and Services Tax (Malaysia) |
| Maldives | 6% | 0% | GST = Goods and services tax (Government Tax) |
| Mali | 18% | | ? |
| Mauritania | 14% | | TVA = Taxe sur la Valeur Ajoutée (الضريبة على القيمة المضافة) |
| Mauritius | 15% | | VAT = Value Added Tax, TVA = Taxe sur la Valeur Ajoutée, TVA = Tax lor Valer Azoute |
| Mexico | 16% | 0% on books, food and medicines. | IVA = Impuesto al Valor Agregado |
| Moldova | 20% | 8%, 5% or 0% | TVA = Taxa pe Valoarea Adăugată |
| Monaco | 19.6% | 5.6% | TVA = Taxe sur la valeur ajoutée |
| Mongolia | 10% | 0% | VAT = Нэмэгдсэн өртгийн албан татвар |
| Montenegro | 21% | 7% | PDV = Porez na dodatu vrijednost |
| Morocco | 20% | | TVA = Taxe sur Valeur Ajoutée (الضريبة على القيمة المضافة) |
| Mozambique | 16% | | IVA = Imposto Sobre o Valor Acrescentado |
| Namibia | 15% | 0% | VAT = Value Added Tax |
| Nepal | 13% | 0% | VAT = Value Added Taxes |
| New Zealand | 15% | 0% (donated goods and services sold by non-profits, financial services, rental payments for residential properties, supply of fine metals, and penalty interest). | GST = Goods and Services Tax |
| Nicaragua | 15% | | ? |
| Niger | 19% | | ? |
| Nigeria | 7.5% | | ? |
| Niue | 5% | | ? |
| North Macedonia | 18% | 5% or 0% | ДДВ = Данок на додадена вредност, DDV = Danok na dodadena vrednost |
| Norway | 25% | 15% (food), 12% (public transport, hotel, cinema) and 0% for electric cars (until 2018) | MVA = Merverdiavgift (bokmål) or meirverdiavgift (nynorsk) (informally moms) |
| Pakistan | 18% | 1% or 0% | GST = General Sales Tax |
| Palau | 10% | | PGST = Palau Goods & Services Tax |
| Palestine | 16% | | VAT = Value Added Tax |
| Panama | 7% | 0% | ITBMS = Impuesto de Transferencia de Bienes Muebles y Servicios |
| Papua New Guinea | 10% | | ? |
| Paraguay | 10% | 5% | IVA= Impuesto al Valor Agregado |
| Peru | 18% | | IGV – 16% = Impuesto General a la Ventas IPM – 2% Impuesto de Promocion Municipal |
| Philippines | 12% (Note: The President of the Philippines has the power to raise the tax to 12% after 1 January 2006. The tax was raised to 12% on 1 February.) | 6% on petroleum products, and electricity and water services 0% for senior citizens (all who are aged 60 and above) on medicines, professional fees for physicians, medical and dental services, transportation fares, admission fees charged by theaters and amusement centers, and funeral and burial services after the death of the senior citizen | RVAT = Reformed Value Added Tax, locally known as Karagdagang Buwis / Dungag nga Buhis |
| Republic of Congo | 16% | | ? |
| Russia | 20% | 10% (essential food, goods for children and medical products) or 0% | НДС = Налог на добавленную стоимость, NDS = Nalog na dobavlennuyu stoimost' |
| Rwanda | 18% | 0% | VAT = Value Added Tax, TVA = Taxe sur la Valeur Ajoutée, UN = Umusoro ku Nyongeramusaruro |
| Saint Kitts and Nevis | 17% | | VAT = Value Added Tax |
| Saint Vincent and the Grenadines | 15% | | ? |
| Samoa | 15% | | VAT = Value Added Tax, LFT = Lafoga Fa'aopoopo Tau |
| Saudi Arabia | 15% | | ضريبة القيمة المضافة (VAT) |
| Senegal | 18% | | ? |
| Serbia | 20% | 10% or 0% | ПДВ = Порез на додату вредност, PDV = Porez na dodatu vrednost |
| Seychelles | 15% | | ? |
| Sierra Leone | 15% | | ? |
| Singapore | 9% | 0% for public healthcare services, such as at public hospitals and polyclinics, with GST absorbed by the government. | GST = Goods and Services Tax |
| South Africa | 15% | 0% on basic foodstuffs such as bread, additionally on goods donated not for gain; goods or services used for educational purposes, such as school computers; membership contributions to an employee organization (such as labour union dues); and rent paid on a house by a renter to a landlord. | VAT = Valued Added Tax; BTW = Belasting op toegevoegde waarde |
| South Korea | 10% | 0% (essential foodstuffs) | VAT = bugagachise (Korean: 부가가치세; Hanja: 附加價値稅) |
| Sri Lanka | 18% | 0% | VAT = Valued Added Tax has been in effect in Sri Lanka since 2001. On the 2001 budget, the rates have been revised to 12% and 0% from the previous 20%, 12% and 0% |
| Sudan | 17% | | ? |
| Switzerland | 8.1% | 3.8% (hotel sector) and 2.6% (essential foodstuff, books, newspapers, medical supplies) | MWST = Mehrwertsteuer, TVA = Taxe sur la valeur ajoutée, IVA = Imposta sul valore aggiunto, TPV = Taglia sin la Plivalur |
| Taiwan | 5% | | 營業稅 yíng yè shuì (business tax) / 加值型營業稅 jiā zhí xíng yíng yè shuì (value-added business tax) |
| Tajikistan | 20% | | ? |
| Tanzania | 18% | | ? |
| Thailand | 10% | 7% | VAT = Value Added Tax, ภาษีมูลค่าเพิ่ม |
| Togo | 18% | | ? |
| Tonga | 15% | | VAT = Value Added Tax, TTM = Tukuhau Tānaki Mahuʻinga |
| Trinidad and Tobago | 12.5% | 0% | ? |
| Tunisia | 19% | | TVA = Taxe sur la Valeur Ajoutée آداء على القيمة المضافة |
| Turkey | 20% | 10% or 1% | KDV = Katma değer vergisi |
| Turkmenistan | 15% | | GGS = Goşulan Gymmatlyk Salgydy |
| Uganda | 18% | | ? |
| Ukraine | 20% | 7% or 0% | ПДВ = Податок на додану вартість, PDV = Podatok na dodanu vartist' |
| United Arab Emirates | 5% | | ضريبة القيمة المضافة |
| United Kingdom | 20% 0% in Guernsey and Gibraltar (not part of EU VAT area) | 5% residential energy/insulation/renovations, feminine hygiene products, child safety seats and mobility aids and 0% for life necessities – basic food, water, prescription medications, medical equipment and medical supply, public transport, children's clothing, books and periodicals. Also 0% for new building construction (but standard rate for building demolition, modifications, renovation etc.) | VAT = Value Added Tax TAW = Treth Ar Werth (Welsh) |
| Uruguay | 22% | 18% or 0% | IVA = Impuesto al Valor Agregado |
| Uzbekistan | 12% | | QQS = Qoʻshilgan Qiymat Soligʻi |
| Vanuatu | 15% | | ? |
| Venezuela | 16% | 11% | IVA = Impuesto al Valor Agregado |
| Vietnam | 10% | 5% or 0% | GTGT = Giá Trị Gia Tăng |
| Zambia | 16% | | VAT = Value Added Tax |
| Zimbabwe | 15% | | VAT = Value Added Tax |
| Yemen | 5% | | آداء على القيمة المضافة |

=== VAT-free countries and territories ===
As of January 2022, the countries and territories listed remained VAT-free.

| Country | Notes |
|---|---|
| Akrotiri and Dhekelia | British Overseas Territory |
| Anguilla | British Overseas Territory |
| Bermuda | British Overseas Territory |
| British Antarctic Territory | British Overseas Territory |
| British Indian Ocean Territory | British Overseas Territory |
| British Virgin Islands | British Overseas Territory |
| Brunei | —N/a |
| Cayman Islands | British Overseas Territory |
| Cuba | —N/a |
| Falkland Islands | British Overseas Territory |
| Gibraltar | British Overseas Territory |
| Guernsey | British Crown Dependency |
| Greenland | Constituent country of the Kingdom of Denmark |
| Hong Kong | Special administrative region of China |
| Iraq | —N/a |
| Kiribati | —N/a |
| Libya | —N/a |
| Macau | Special administrative region of China |
| Maldives | —N/a |
| Marshall Islands | —N/a |
| Micronesia | —N/a |
| Montserrat | British Overseas Territory |
| Myanmar | —N/a |
| Nauru | —N/a |
| North Korea | —N/a |
| Pitcairn Islands | British Overseas Territory |
| Saint Helena, Ascension and Tristan da Cunha | British Overseas Territory |
| San Marino | —N/a |
| Sao Tome and Principe | —N/a |
| Solomon Islands | —N/a |
| Somalia | —N/a |
| South Georgia and the South Sandwich Islands | British Overseas Territory |
| Svalbard | —N/a |
| Syria | —N/a |
| Timor Leste | —N/a |
| Turks and Caicos Islands | British Overseas Territory |
| Tuvalu | —N/a |
| United States | Sales taxes are collected by most states and some cities, counties, and Native American reservations. The federal government collects excise tax on some goods, but does not collect a nationwide sales tax. |
| Vatican City | —N/a |

== See also ==
- Excise
- Flat tax
- Georgism
- Gross receipts tax
- Henry George
- Import One-Stop Shop (IOSS)
- Income tax
- Land value tax
- Missing trader fraud (Carousel VAT Fraud)
- Progressive tax
- Single tax
- X tax

General:

- List of countries by tax rates
