= X tax =

Form of consumption tax

The X Tax is an approach to taxation conceived by Princeton University economist and New York University School of Law professor David F. Bradford, It consists of two taxes:

- The corporate tax component, referred to as the business cash flow tax, levies taxes on company sales while excluding material expenses and wages. Unlike traditional corporate income tax, firms are able to immediately expense all capital investment (called "full expensing"). This ensures that normal profit is out of the tax base and only super-normal profits are taxed.
- The personal tax component, is a progressive payroll tax with the highest payroll bracket taxed at the same rate as the business cash flow tax.

The reason an X Tax is considered to be a consumption tax is because, unlike the income tax, it doesn't introduce a "double-tax on savings."

The X Tax is intended to streamline the tax code, foster economic expansion, and preserve progressive taxation. Additionally, it seeks to stimulate savings and investments by eliminating double taxation. Under the X Tax, financial transactions and instruments are not subject to taxation for both individuals and corporations. Bradford argues that "the government should exempt from taxation all dividends, interest, and other income from savings. That way, people will be treated equally by the tax system, whether they choose to spend now or save to increase their future spending power."

== See also ==
- Destination-based cash flow tax, a tax proposal that is similar to the corporate portion of the X tax
- FairTax
- Income tax in the United States
- Taxation in the United States
- Tax reform
