= Consumption tax =

Type of tax

A consumption tax is a tax levied on consumption spending on goods and services. The tax base of such a tax is the money spent on consumption. Consumption taxes are usually indirect, such as a sales tax or a value-added tax. However, a consumption tax can also be structured as a form of direct, personal taxation, which is known as an expenditure tax.

== Tax rate by country ==
Here are consumption tax rate by country/state for OECD countries:

Consumption tax rate by country for OECD countries
Country	Consumption Tax (VAT/GST %)
Australia	10
Austria	20
Belgium	21
Canada	5
Chile	19
Czech Republic	21
Denmark	25
Estonia	22
Finland	25.5
France	20
Germany	19
Greece	24
Hungary	27
Iceland	24
Ireland	23
Israel	18
Italy	22
Japan	10
Korea (South Korea)	10
Luxembourg	17
Mexico	16
Netherlands	21
New Zealand	15
Norway	25
Poland	23
Portugal	23
Slovak Republic	20
Slovenia	22
Spain	21
Sweden	25
Switzerland	8.1
Turkey	20
United Kingdom	20

Consumption tax rate by state of the United States
State	Consumption Tax (VAT/GST %)
Alabama	4
Alaska	0
Arizona	5.6
Arkansas	6.5
California	7.25
Colorado	2.9
Connecticut	6.35
Delaware	0
Florida	6
Georgia	4
Hawaii	4
Idaho	6.25
Illinois	7
Indiana	6
Iowa	6.5
Kansas	6
Kentucky	6
Louisiana	6
Maine	6
Maryland	6.25
Massachusetts	6
Michigan	6.875
Minnesota	6.25
Mississippi	4.225
Missouri	6
Montana	0
Nevada	6.625
New Hampshire	5
New Jersey	4.75
New Mexico	4
New York	5.75
North Carolina	5.75
North Dakota	6.25
Ohio	6.5
Oklahoma	0
Oregon	6.25
Pennsylvania	7
Rhode Island	6
South Carolina	6
South Dakota	6.25
Tennessee	4

== Types ==
=== Value-added tax ===
A value-added tax applies to the market value added to a product or material at each stage of its manufacture or distribution. For example, if a retailer buys a shirt for twenty dollars and sells it for thirty dollars, this tax would apply to the ten dollar difference between the two amounts.

A simple value-added tax is proportional to consumption but is regressive on income at higher income levels, as consumption tends to fall as a percentage of income as income rises. Savings and investment are tax-deferred until they become consumption. A value-added tax may exclude certain goods to make it less regressive against income. It is common in European Union countries.

Value added tax is a consumption based tax and is levied each and every time the value of a good gets increased in the process of manufacturing to the point of sale.

In Australia, Canada, India, New Zealand and Singapore, it is instead called a "Goods and Services Tax." In Canada, it is also called Harmonized Sales Tax when it is combined with a provincial sales tax.

=== Sales tax ===
Sales tax is a consumption tax applicable to sales of goods and services. A sales tax typically applies to the sale of goods, and sometimes includes the sales of services. The tax is applied at the point of sale. The tax amount is usually ad valorem, that is, it is calculated by applying a percentage rate to the price of a sale. When a tax on goods or services is paid to a governing body directly by a consumer, it is usually called a use tax. Often, laws provide for the exemption of certain goods or services from such taxes.

Laws may allow sellers to itemize the tax separately from the price of the goods or services, or they may require it to be included in the price.

=== Excise tax ===
An excise tax is a sales tax that applies to a specific class of goods, typically alcohol, tobacco, gasoline (petrol), or tourism. The tax rate varies according to the type of good and quantity purchased and is typically unaffected by the person who purchases it.

Sin taxes, are a type of excise tax imposed on items that are considered harmful to society, in an effort to decrease their consumption by increasing their prices.

=== Expenditure tax ===
A direct, personal consumption tax may take the form of an expenditure tax, that is, an income tax that deducts savings and investments, such as the Hall–Rabushka flat tax. A direct consumption tax may be called an expenditure tax, a cash-flow tax, or a consumed-income tax and can be flat or progressive. Expenditure taxes were briefly implemented in the past in India and Sri Lanka.

This form of tax applies to the difference between an individual's income and any increase/decrease in savings. Simple personal consumption taxes are regressive with respect to income. However, because this tax applies on an individual basis, it can be made progressive. Just as income tax rates increase with personal income, progressive consumption tax rates increase with personal consumption. Economists from Milton Friedman to Edward Gramlich and Robert H. Frank supported a progressive consumption tax.

== History ==
Consumption taxes, specifically excise taxes, have featured in several notable historic events. In the United States, the stamp tax, the tax on tea, and whiskey taxes produced revolts, the first two against the British government and the latter against the federal government. In India, an excise tax on salt led to Mohandas Gandhi's famous Salt March, a major event in the Indian Independence Movement.

=== United States ===
In the early United States, taxes were levied principally on consumption. Alexander Hamilton, one of the two chief authors of the anonymous The Federalist Papers, favored consumption taxes in part because they are harder to raise to confiscatory levels than income taxes. In The Federalist Papers (No. 21), Hamilton wrote:

It is a signal advantage of taxes on articles of consumption that they contain in their own nature a security against excess. They prescribe their own limit, which cannot be exceeded without defeating the end proposed—that is, an extension of the revenue. When applied to this object, the saying is as just as it is witty that, "in political arithmetic, two and two do not always make four." If duties are too high, they lessen the consumption; the collection is eluded; and the product to the treasury is not so great as when they are confined within proper and moderate bounds. This forms a complete barrier against any material oppression of the citizens by taxes of this class, and is itself a natural limitation of the power of imposing them.

Although personal and corporate income taxes provide the bulk of revenue to the federal government, consumption taxes continue to be a primary source of income for state and local governments. One of the first detailed proposals of a personal consumption tax was developed in 1974 by William Andrews.

=== Japan ===
The Liberal Democratic Party government of Masayoshi Ōhira attempted to introduce a consumption tax in 1979. Ohira met opposition within his own party and gave up on his attempt after his party suffered badly in the 1979 election. Ten years later, Noboru Takeshita successfully negotiated with politicians, bureaucrats, business, and labor unions to introduce a consumption tax, which was introduced at a rate of 3% in 1989.

In April 1997, under the government of Ryutaro Hashimoto the rate increased to 5%. The 5% is split between the national and local governments, which receive 4% and 1%, respectively. Shortly after the tax was introduced Japan fell into recession, which was blamed by some on the consumption tax increase, and by others on the 1997 Asian financial crisis.

Prime Minister Junichiro Koizumi said he had no intention of raising the tax during his government, but after his massive victory in the 2005 election, he lifted a ban on discussing it. Over the following years LDP politicians discussed raising it further, including prime ministers Shinzō Abe, Yasuo Fukuda, and Tarō Asō.

The Democratic Party came to power in the August 2009 elections with a promise not to raise the consumption tax for four years. The first DPJ prime minister, Yukio Hatoyama was opposed, but Naoto Kan replaced him and called for the consumption tax to be raised. The following prime minister, Yoshihiko Noda "staked his political life" on raising the tax. Despite an internal battle that saw former DPJ leader and co-founder Ichirō Ozawa and many other DPJ diet members vote against the bill and then leave the party; on June 26, 2012, the lower house of the Japanese diet passed a bill to double the tax to 10%.

Despite considerable opposition and an attempted no-confidence motion from minor opposition parties the bill was successfully passed through the upper house on August 10, 2012, with the result that the tax increased to 8% in April 2014 and to 10% in October 2019 (twice postponed from the original date of October 2015).

== Savings effect ==
To the extent that taxing something results in less of it (whether income or consumption), taxing consumption instead of income should encourage both work and capital formation, which increases economic growth, while discouraging consumption. Secondly, the tax base is larger because all consumption is taxed.

Flat consumption taxes are regressive (shift the tax burden to the less well-off). The ratio of tax obligation to income tends to shrink as income increases because high-earners tend to consume proportionally less of their income. An individual unable to save will pay taxes on all his income, but an individual who saves or invests a portion of his income is taxed only on the remaining income.

== Practical considerations ==
Many proposed consumption taxes share some features with income tax systems. Under these proposals, taxpayers are typically given exemptions and/or a standard deduction in order to ensure that the poor do not pay any tax. In a flat consumption tax, these other deductions are not permitted.

A withholding system may be put into place in order to approximate the average tax liability, smoothing payments. It is difficult for many taxpayers to pay no tax all year, only to face a large year-end tax bill.

Andrews notes the inherent problem with housing. Renters necessarily "consume" housing, so they would be taxed on the expenditure of rent. However, homeowners also consume housing in the same way, but as they pay down a mortgage, the payments are classified as savings, not consumption (because equity is being built in an asset).

The disparity is explained by what is known as the imputed rental value of a home. A homeowner could choose to rent the home to others in exchange for money, but instead chooses to live in the home. Therefore, the homeowner is also consuming housing by not permitting renters to pay for and occupy the home. The amount of money that the homeowner could receive in rent is the imputed rental value of the home.

A true consumption tax would tax the imputed rental value of the home (which could be determined in the same way that valuation occurs for property tax purposes) but not the increase in the asset value (the home). Andrews proposes to ignore this method of taxing imputed rental values because of its complexity. In the United States, home ownership is subsidized by the federal government by permitting limited deductions for mortgage interest expense and capital gains. Therefore, treating renters and homeowners identically under such a consumption tax may not be feasible there.

This issue would not arise under an expenditure tax, since all withdrawals of funds from a pre-tax investment account are treated as taxable consumption, whether these funds are used to pay rent, buy a house, or pay down mortgage principal. A person may buy a house within a pre-tax account, but would not be allowed to live there.

Also, a consumption tax could utilize progressive rates in order to maintain "fairness". More consumption means disproportionately more tax liability.

== Economic impact ==
The temporal neutrality of a consumption tax, however, is that consumption itself is taxed, so it is irrelevant what good or service is being consumed in terms of allocation of resources. The only possible effect on neutrality is between consumption and savings. Taxing only consumption should, in theory, cause an increase in savings.

Many economists and tax experts favor consumption taxes over income taxes for economic growth.

Depending on implementation (such as treatment of depreciation) and circumstances, income taxes either favor or disfavor investment. (On the whole, the American system is thought to disfavor investment.) By not disfavoring investment, a consumption tax would increase the capital stock, productivity, and therefore increase the size of the economy. Consumption also more closely tracks long-run average income. The income of an individual or family can often vary dramatically from year to year. The sale of a home, a one-time job bonus, and various other events can lead to temporary high income that will push a lower or middle income person into a higher tax bracket. On the other hand, a wealthier individual may be temporarily unemployed and earn no income.

== Impact on work choices ==
Consumption taxes, like other taxes, alter individual decisions away from optimal choices. An important concern is potential impact on individual work decisions. Two possible impacts are known as income effect (taxes reduce the real value of work) and substitution effect (changes in relative value of work in relation to other activities).

=== Income effect ===
Under a consumption tax, an individual's purchasing power decreases, either through increased prices (producers pass the tax along to the consumer) or through decreased wages (taxing authorities directly tax the consumer based on a measurement of their consumption). Assuming the former case, of increased prices, if an individual had monthly expenses of $1,000 and an hourly wage of $10 per hour, they would have to work 100 hours a month to cover the expenditures. However, under a 10% consumption tax and assuming the tax is passed completely on to consumers, the monthly expenditures would be $1,100 meaning the individual would have to work 110 hours to cover them. It is expected that individuals increase their amount of work to compensate for the loss of consumption power as a response to increased taxation.

=== Substitution effect ===
Along with decrease in purchasing power, taxes also decrease the relative value of work in relation to leisure time. If a tax is implemented on consumption, the value of spending an hour at work decreases in relation to different activities because the tax decreases the actual amount of goods and services an individual can purchase for a given level of work. This subsequently increases the relative value of leisure time and decreases amount of working time, effectively working opposite to the income effect.

If the consumption tax is to be revenue neutral, the tax rate is likely to be higher in comparison with an income tax, because of the smaller tax base. While the tax base for income tax includes all of personal income, the tax base for consumption tax include only income less savings, thus being necessarily smaller. The higher tax rate might then result in an increased substitution effect. However, the consumption tax is levied also on past savings consumed later in individual's life, e.g. during retirement. The tax on this capital is not expected to distort one's behavior, because there is no legal way to avoid this tax burden. The consumption tax on past savings is thus an example of a lump-sum tax. As a consequence, the consumption tax rate does not have to be that much higher than income tax rate in order to preserve revenue neutrality. One possible disadvantage is a higher burden among elderly, consuming primarily their past savings.

=== Empirical evidence ===
According to theory, taxes have two opposing effects on individual's work decisions, the net impact might thus be unclear. Empirical evidence shows that increased taxes cause a decrease in work effort, meaning the substitution effect is larger than the income effect. A study shows that a consumption tax is likely to decrease work effort more than an income tax, although the difference is expected to be minor.

== Tax burden of consumption tax ==
=== Tax burden across income classes ===
Consumption taxes are often criticised to be regressive, meaning the average tax rate decreases with increasing income. However, it depends on income measurement. If income is measured annually or monthly, consumption taxes are truly regressive, as higher-income individuals can afford to save more, thus reducing the tax base for consumption tax more significantly than lower-income individuals. But if lifetime income is used to measure the ability to pay, the burden tends to be more equitable as over a lifetime, lifetime consumption is a good approximation of lifetime income.

=== Tax burden across age groups ===
Because the tax base of consumption tax depends mostly on the ability to save money, it can be expected that middle-aged individuals will have the smallest tax burden as a percentage of their annual income. Elderly people and young adults will on the other hand face higher tax burden as a portion of their income, having more difficulties to save larger amounts of income.

== See also ==
- Alcohol tax
- Excise tax
- FairTax
- Flat tax
- Land value tax
- Pigovian tax
- Sales tax
- Sin tax
- Turnover tax
- Value-added tax
- X tax
- William Petty, early classical economist who proposed a consumption tax
- The Philosophy of Poverty, by mutualist theorist Pierre-Joseph Proudhon
