= Destination principle =

Concept in international taxation

The destination principle is a concept of international taxation which allows for value added taxes to be retained by the country where the taxed product is being sold. They are collected on imports and rebated on exports.

This principle is also applied to the Goods and Services Tax of several countries like India.

== Origin versus destination principle ==
According to Alan V. Deardorff at the University of Michigan, Ann Arbor, the origin principle, in contrast to the destination principle in international taxation is the principle "that value added taxes be kept only by the country where production takes place". Under the origin principle, value added taxes are not collected on imports and not rebated on exports. In contrast, the destination principle, which allows for value added taxes to be retained by the country where the taxed product is being sold.
