= Resource rent =

Surplus value after accounting for costs

Resource rent is rent paid for the use of natural resources such as coastal space, minerals, waterfalls, rivers, oil reserves and wind channels. Some countries levy resource rent taxes that come in addition to corporate taxes for businesses that use natural resources. Resource rents have been called a "natural dividend" that should belong to the people who own the natural resources that create the surplus wealth. Examples include the Norwegian resource rent taxes on aquaculture, hydro- and wind-power generation industries for their use of coastal waterways, waterfalls and wind channels that come in addition to regular corporate taxes. Proposals have been made to also charge resource rent taxes on datacentres for their use of energy.

In economics, rent is a surplus value after all costs and normal returns have been accounted for, i.e. the difference between the price at which an output from a resource can be sold and its respective extraction and production costs, including normal return. This concept is usually termed economic rent but when referring to rent in natural resources, it is commonly called resource rent. It can also be conceptualised as abnormal or supernormal profit.

== Categories of rent ==
Rent can be categorised into different kinds depending on how it is created. In general one can distinguish three different kinds of rent, which can also occur together: differential, scarcity, and entrepreneurial rent.

- Differential rent (also called quality or Ricardian rent) arises because of differences in the quality of similar goods or inputs (e.g. production sites). Consider two companies that extract coal of identical quality. The market price of coal is $50/t. Company X operates at a production site where it is very easy to extract coal. Its costs (including normal returns) amount to $20/t. Company Y operates at a site where it is relatively difficult to extract coal. Its costs (including normal returns) amount to $30/t. Company X will ‘create’ more resource rent because of the more accessible resource.
- Scarcity rent (also called depletion or Hotelling rent) arises because extracting a finite resource today reduces the stock available for future use. As the resource becomes scarcer, its value increases even if extraction costs remain constant. Scarcity rent reflects arbitrage over time: if the present price were any lower, a producer would prefer to produce less now in order to produce more later. Consider an oil field with 1 million barrels of recoverable oil. Each barrel costs $30 to extract (including normal returns). The market price of oil is currently $50, yielding a rent of $20 per barrel. Over time, as other oil field depletes and new oil fields are harder or more costly to develop, the market price rises to $70 while extraction cost on this particular oil field remains $30. The scarcity rent per barrel has now increased to $40.
- Entrepreneurial rent (also called quasi-rent or Schumpeterian rent) can accrue due to entrepreneurial skills or managerial investments. A company may invest in advertising, training of employees, and so forth. These investments can result in a higher price (brand) or lower costs (better technology). Consider the “production” of rock lobster where the costs to produce one rock lobster (i.e. paying for labour, the nets, and the like, and including normal profit) amount to $3. Assume the rock lobster is sold for $5 on the market. Resource rent here amounts to $2. However, assume the fisher has managed to decrease the costs for catching rock lobster from $3 to $2. This could be due to his/her entrepreneurial skills and more efficient use of labour and capital. Resource rent increases from $2 to $3.

== See also ==
- Hotelling's rule
- Resource economics
