= American International Automobile Dealers Association =

American trade body

The American International Automobile Dealers Association (sometimes abbreviated as AIADA) is a United States lobbying force dedicated to the economic and political interests of America's international nameplate automobile dealers. Headquartered in Alexandria, Virginia, its primary focus is on promoting free trade.

== History ==
AIADA was established in 1970 as the Volkswagen Dealers Association in response to a growing protectionist movement in the United States. On January 30, 1970, VADA opened membership to any franchised dealer of imported automobiles and changed its name to the American Imported Automobile Dealers Association (AIADA). "Imported" was later changed to "international." Ken Sowles became the association's second president. Its current president is Cody Lusk.

== Activities ==
AIADA has fought back against protectionist policies and legislation, including a proposed Border Adjustment Tax in 2017. In 2020, AIADA celebrated its 50th anniversary with a renewed focus on the value of free trade to the livelihoods of its dealer members, who account for more than half of the U.S. auto market and employ over 500,000 Americans.
