= Zero-rated supply =

Theory in economics

In economics, zero-rated supply refers to items subject to a 0% VAT tax on their input supplies. The term is applied to items that would normally be taxed under valued-added systems such as Europe's Value Added Tax (VAT) or Canada's Goods and Services Tax (GST). Examples of these items include most exports, basic groceries, and prescription drugs.

Under the Indian 2016 GST Act, any supplies (supply should be defined in accordance with GST India) made by a registered dealer as an export (both goods or services) or supply to an SEZ qualifies for Zero Rated Supplies in GST. This attracts zero rate of taxation and ITC (Input Tax Credit) can also be explained through the e-portal of GST Council.
