= Border-adjustment tax =

A border-adjustment tax (also known as a border-adjusted tax, destination tax, destination-based cash flow tax or a border tax adjustment) is a tax on goods based on location of final consumption rather than production. It allegedly eliminates incentives for companies to reduce their tax bills through tax inversion and intangible asset relocation.

== History ==
The concept of a border-adjustment tax was originally the subject of a 1997 article by economist Alan J. Auerbach. Auerbach worked with Michael Devereux, who had introduced with Stephen R. Bond, the term destination-based corporate tax. Auerbach described a system that he claimed would align business incentives with the national interest.

== Currency adjustment ==
While it may appear that this would increase consumer prices, Auerbach's theory holds that a border-adjustment tax would strengthen the domestic currency by a proportion corresponding to the tax rate. The stronger domestic currency would effectively reduce the price of imported goods, effectively cancelling out the higher tax on imports.

== Trade effects ==
In theory, a border-adjustment tax is trade neutral: the stronger domestic currency would make exports more expensive internationally, lowering demand for exported products while reducing the costs incurred by domestic firms in purchasing goods and services in foreign markets, helping importers. Thus, the anticipated strengthening of the domestic currency effectively neutralizes the border-adjustment tax, resulting in a trade-neutral outcome. However other studies indicate that currency adjustments may not always flow through to price adjustments, shifting the incidence of the tax to consumers and/or producers.

== United States ==
In the United States, the Republican Party in 2016 included most of Auerbach's recommendations in their policy paper "A Better Way — Our Vision for a Confident America", which promoted a move to "a destination-basis tax system." As of February 2017, the proposal was the subject of heated debate - with Gary Cohn, Director of the National Economic Council opposing it and the Koch brothers-funded Americans for Prosperity (AFP) lobby group, unveiling their plan to fight the tax.

== See also ==
- Destination-based cash flow tax
