= Abnormal profit =

Profit above normal return to capital

In economics, abnormal profit, also called excess profit, supernormal profit, or pure profit, is "profit of a firm over and above what provides its owners with a normal (market equilibrium) return to capital." Normal profit (return) in turn is defined as opportunity cost of the owner's resources. A related broader term is economic rent, which applies to the owner of a resource, such as land, rather than to the firm as such.

According to the theoretical model of perfect competition, abnormal profits are unsustainable because they stimulate new supply, which forces down prices and eliminates the abnormal profit. Abnormal profit persists in the long run in imperfectly competitive markets where firms successfully block the entry of new firms. A monopoly can keep earning abnormal profit in the long run, because barriers to entry stop new firms from entering even while the incumbent is profitable.

In principle, there are three kinds of abnormal profit:

- Monopoly profit
- Resource rent
- Intramarginal rent

Business writer Michael Porter and Anita M. McGahan undertook an empirical study of the "emergence and sustainability of abnormal profits" in 2003, in which they concluded that both industry structure and firm performance were determinants of whether abnormal profits could be sustained by firms.

== See also ==
- Economic rent
- War profiteering
- Windfall gain
- Excess profits tax
- Quasi-rent, a common source of small abnormal profits
