= Carbon-based fuel =

Carbon-based fuel is any fuel principally from the oxidation or burning of carbon. Carbon-based fuels are of two main kinds, biofuels and fossil fuels. Whereas biofuels are derived from recent-growth organic matter and are typically harvested, as with logging of forests and cutting of corn, fossil fuels are of prehistoric origin and are extracted from the ground, the principal fossil fuels being oil, coal, and natural gas.

From an economic policy perspective, an important distinction between biofuels and fossil fuels is that only the former is sustainable or renewable.

Whereas we can continue to obtain energy from biofuels indefinitely in principle, the Earth's reserves of fossil fuels was determined millions of years ago and is therefore fixed as far as our foreseeable future is concerned. The great variability in the ease of extraction of fossil fuels however makes its endgame scenario one of increasing prices over one or more centuries rather than of abrupt exhaustion.

From the perspective of climate and ecology, biofuels and fossil fuels have in common that they contribute to the production of atmospheric carbon dioxide, which has emerged in recent decades as the fastest-changing greenhouse gas, whose principal impacts are global warming and ocean acidification. However biofuels actively participate in the carbon cycle today by photosynthesizing carbon dioxide, unlike fossil fuels whose participation was long ago, and can therefore in principle bring atmospheric CO_{2} into an equilibrium not possible with the continued use of fossil fuel. But in practice photosynthesis is a slow process, and the additional fuel produced by artificial methods of accelerating it such as application of fertilizer tends to be offset by the energy consumed by the accelerating processes, to a degree currently under active debate. In contrast the speed of photosynthesis is immaterial for fossil fuels because they had millions of years in which to accumulate. Burning of both fossil fuels and biofuels usually also produces carbon monoxide, which is toxic and can kill a person after mixing with the haemoglobin of the blood, increasing its concentration in the body. Biofuels and fossil fuels may also produce many other air pollutants depending on the contents of the fuel.
