= Marshall L. Saunders =

American philanthropist, citizen lobbyist, and climate activist

Marshall Saunders
- Born: 1939; Waco, Texas, U.S.
- Died: December 28, 2019 (aged 80); Coronado, California, U.S.
- Education: University of Texas at Austin (BA)

Marshall L. Saunders (1939 – December 28, 2019) was an American activist and founder of the Citizens' Climate Lobby. He raised funds and served on the board of a microfinance organization, spoke to thousands about climate change, and lobbied for United States Congress to adopt policies to reduce poverty.

== Early life ==
Saunders was born in Waco, Texas, to Lucille and Marshall Saunders. He graduated from the University of Texas at Austin in 1961, where he studied Latin America economic development.

== Career ==
After college, Saunders worked as a smokejumper in the Pacific Northwest and served in the United States Navy, which brought him to San Diego. After working for the Shell Oil Company, he became a real estate broker in 1968.

Saunders inherited wealth due to his family's business, Big Red, a soft drink line popular in Texas. His wealth enabled him to establish Grameen de la Frontera, a microcredit organization and the Citizens' Climate Lobby.

=== Microfinance ===
In 1985, Saunders joined the Rotary Club in Coronado, California and served until 2000. In the late 1980's he heard of microfinance and was attracted the idea of "building community, giving people dignity and standing in the process." He joined he board of the Foundation for International Community Assistance and served for 4 years, raising $750,000 for microcredit lenders in 16 countries. Saunders served on the microfinance organization, Grameen Foundation USA's development committee. There he helped raise funds for fifty other Grameen banks in South America. Also Saunders served on the board of Cash Poor, an organization that helped Grameen banks of Southeast Asia.

=== RESULTS ===
In 1994, Saunders attended a RESULTS conference. Returning home, he became a local group leader. At the Utah Rotary District 5420 conference in June 2019, Saunders explained in an interview how he got letters in the paper. His efforts, along with others, resulted in Congressional AIDS expenditures of $550 million, more than the $220 proposed by the President. Saunders spent 12 years volunteering with RESULTS, which has had major successes building support in Congress for policies targeting the basic needs of the poor.

=== Citizens Climate Lobby ===
After learning of the threat posed by climate change, Saunders realized he had to educate members of Congress about the issue. After he had lobbied Congress for 15 years on hunger, microcredit, and poverty, he believed the next logical step was an organization focused on the climate, saying "There's got to be an organization that teaches ordinary people to lobby the Congress on environmental issues and climate issues." In 2007 Saunders worked with RESULTS' founder Sam Daley-Harris and used his personal wealth to create the Citizens' Climate Lobby.

The organization has grown to over 400 chapters. The organization enables citizens to be effective lobbyists, helping them to persuasively advocate for climate policies, most recently a revenue-neutral carbon tax. The Energy Innovation and Carbon Dividend Act of 2019 (H.R. 763) was introduced in 2019 and is based on the group's policy plan, a carbon tax and dividend designed to lower greenhouse gas emissions.

== Personal life ==
Until his death in 2019, Saunders was married to Pam Spence, and they resided in Coronado, California. They have two children, a son Britton and a daughter Lucy. Saunders died at age 80 on December 28, 2019.
