= Sixty-sixth session of the United Nations General Assembly =

13 September 2011

- 13 September 2011 – 18 September 2012 66th session 66th general debate
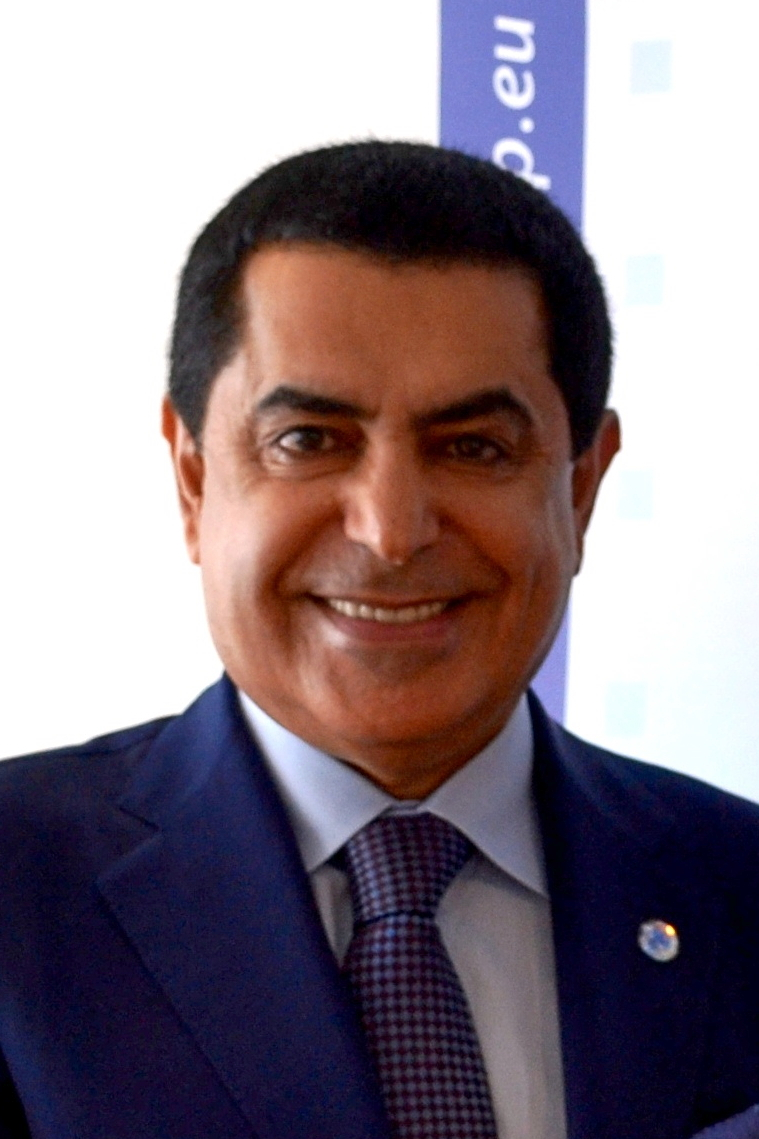
- President of the 66th General Assembly; Nassir Abdulaziz Al-Nasser
- Host country: United Nations
- Cities: New York City
- Venues: General Assembly Hall at the United Nations Headquarters
- Participants: Member states of the United Nations
- Secretary-General: Ban Ki-moon
- Website: www.un.org/en/ga/

The sixty-sixth session of the United Nations General Assembly opened on 13 September 2011 at 15:00 and was presided over by former Qatari permanent representative to the UN Nassir Abdulaziz Al-Nasser. The session ended on 18 September as al-Nasser symbolically passed the gavel to the president of the next session, Vuk Jeremic.

== Organisation for the session ==
On 23 June 2011, Qatar's Nassir Abdulaziz Al-Nasser was elected president of the General Assembly after beating Nepal's Kul Chandra Gautam in an election. He said that his focus would on "Bridging Differences, Building Consensus". He also added that world faces "enormous political, social, economic and environmental challenges...people still were living under occupation, while other crucial questions of human rights, sustainable development and poverty eradication, among many others, persisted." He further said that "respect for diversity and pluralism – regardless of religion, race or ethnicity – was a principle on which the United Nations was founded, and he pledged to undertake his role as President in a spirit of constructive cooperation and mutual respect."

He also responded to questions about what he would do about supporting the Arab Spring in saying that "I hope as an Arab that it will be dealt with through the Arab League," which, according to Reuters, contrasted with his predecessor's statement in praising Secretary-General Ban Ki-moon's support for the wave of protests. Ban Ki-moon said of Al-Nasser that he had already shown his ability after presiding over the Security Council, Chairman of the Fourth Committee and Chairman of the Group of 77 developing countries and China; that he led efforts to deal with autism; and that with Qatar's increasing emergence as a player in the field of international relations, as in the facilitation of the Darfur peace talks, he was grateful for such support. He also emphasised that he would work to ensure the partnership with the Secretariat remained strong. Outgoing president Joseph Deiss congratulated Al-Nasser and said service at the UN had earned him respect and esteem from his colleagues. He was also congratulated by representatives of the various regional groupings at the UN: Senegal (African Group), Kuwait (Asian Group), Moldova (Eastern European Group), Bolivia (Latin American and Caribbean Group), Israel (Western European and Other Group) and the United States (host country).

As is tradition during each session of the General Assembly, Moon drew lots to see which member state would take the helm at the first seat in the General Assembly Chamber. Turkmenistan was chosen, and the other member states would follow according to the English translation of their name, the same order would be followed in the six main committees.

The Chairmen and officers of the six Main committees were also elected:

- Chair of the First Committee (Disarmament and International Security): Jarmo Viinanen (Finland); Mohammad Al-Mutairi (Kuwait) as Vice-Chair; and Archil Gheghechkori (Georgia) as Rapporteur.
- Chair of the Second Committee (Economic and Financial): Abulkalam Abdul Momen (Bangladesh); Philippe Donckel (Luxembourg), Raymond Harold Landveld (Suriname) and Denis Zdorov (Belarus) as Vice-Chairs.
- Chair of the Third Committee (Social, Humanitarian and Cultural): Hussein Haniff (Malaysia); Donnette Critchlow (Guyana), Carolina Popovici (Moldova) and Luca Zelioli (Italy) as Vice-Chairs.
- Chair of the Fourth Committee (Special Political and Decolonisation): Simona-Mirela Miculescu (Romania); Jim Kelly (Ireland) and María-Waleska Vivas-Mendoza (Venezuela) elected as Vice-Chairs.
- Fifth Committee (Administrative and Budgetary): Michel Tommo Monthe (Cameroon); Paul Ballantyne (New Zealand), Mariam Saif Abdulla Al-Shamisi (United Arab Emirates) and Jelena Plakalović (Serbia) elected as Vice-Chairs
- Sixth Committee (Legal): Hernán Salinas Burgos (Chile); Mattanee Kaewpanya (Thailand), Petr Válek (Czech Republic) and Ceta Noland (Netherlands) as Vice-Chairs; and Jacqueline K. Moseti (Kenya) as Rapporteur.

The nineteen vice-presidents of the UNGA also elected were: Benin, Chad, Liberia, Malawi and Morocco (African group); Fiji, Iran, Kuwait and South Korea (Asian group); Hungary (Eastern European group); Bolivia, Haiti and Uruguay (Latin American and Caribbean group); and Australia and Austria (Western European and Other group). The permanent members of the Security Council (China, France, Russian Federation, United Kingdom and the United States) are also automatically appointed as vice-presidents. Al-Nasser announced that an additional African state would be elected to the vice-presidency at a later date.

== Opening schedule ==
The schedule for the opening of the annual session included:

- 13 September – Official session opening at 15:00 by President Nassir Abdulaziz Al-Nasser at 15:00
- 14 September – General Committee meeting
- 16 September – Plenary meeting (Issuance of the first report of the General Committee meeting)
- 19–20 September – A "high-level meeting" on the prevention and control of non-communicable diseases (as per resolution 65/238)
- 20 September – A "high-level meeting" that seeks "Addressing desertification, land degradation and drought in the context of sustainable development and poverty eradication" (as per resolution 65/160)
- 21–23, 26–27 September – General debate, with opening speeches by most states
- 22 September – A "high-level meeting" of the General Assembly to commemorate the tenth anniversary of the adoption of the Durban Declaration and Programme of Action at the Durban Review Conference (as per resolution 65/240)

=== General debate ===
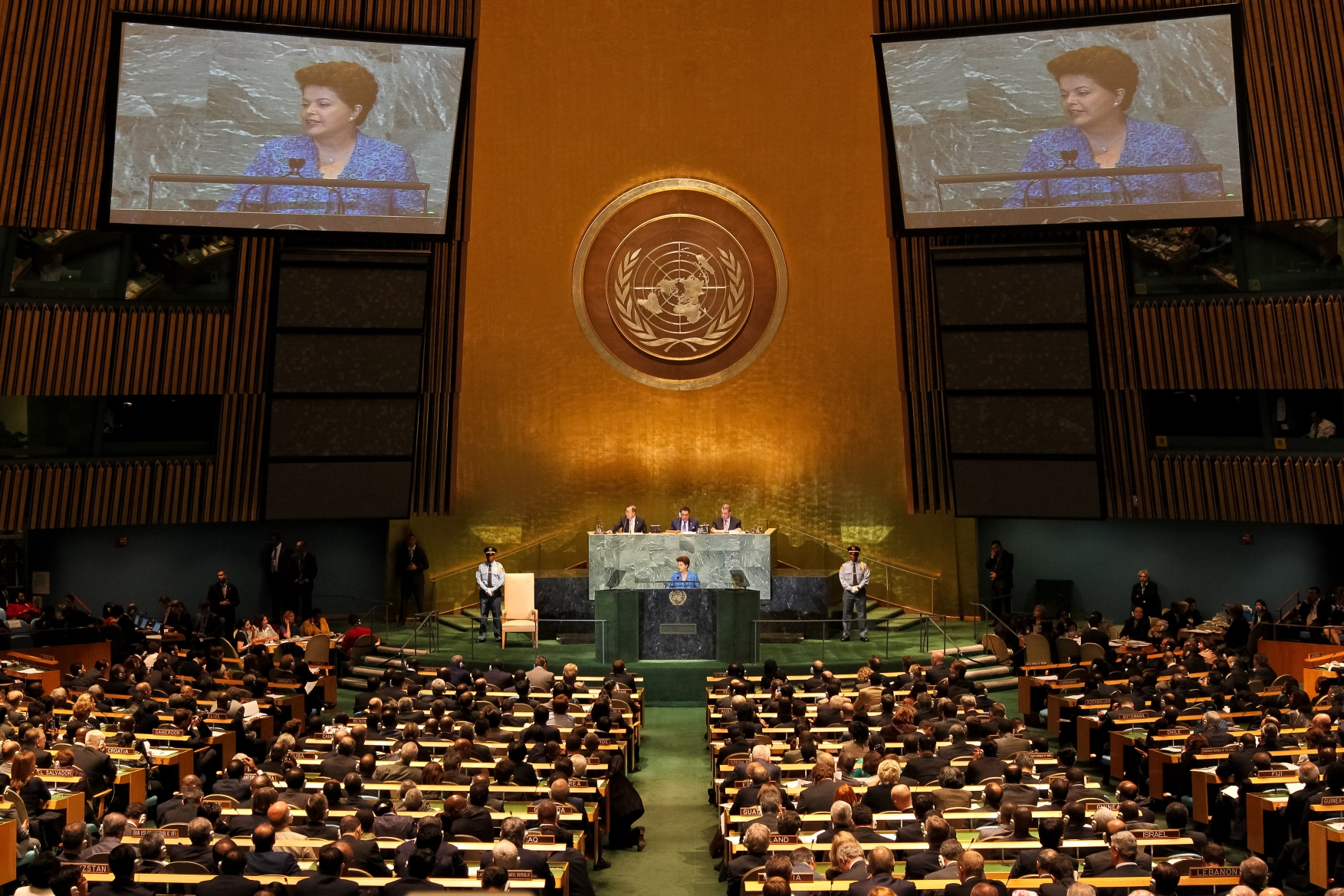
President of Brazil Dilma Rousseff became the first woman to open the general debate.

Most states will have a representative speaking about issues concerning their country and the hopes for the coming year as to what the UNGA will do. This is as opportunity for the member states to opine on international issues of their concern. Some heads of state, other government leaders or permanent representatives to the UN (or other members of national delegations at the UN) are scheduled to speak. The speeches would occur on 21, 22, 23, 24, 26 and 27 September in the General Assembly Chamber. (the biggest chamber at the United Nations building)

President al-Nasser said that he would propose the theme for the debate as "the role of mediation in the settlement of disputes by peaceful means," in order to enhance cooperation on one of the United Nations' founding ethos that he said also affects the UN's "existence...integrity, legitimacy, survival and effectiveness.". The theme is traditionally chosen by the President of the General Assembly, who proposes a theme of global relevant to the member states; in turn, the member states then approve of the matter and comment on it during the general debate. Additionally, member states would comment on issues of individual national and wider international relevance.

== Agenda ==
The broader preliminary agenda for the session is:

- The promotion of sustained economic growth and development in accord with the relevant resolutions fromh the General Assembly as well as other newer United Nations conferences.
- The general maintenance of international peace and security.
- Development in Africa.
- The promotion of human rights.
- Coordination for effective humanitarian assistance efforts.
- The general promotion of justice and international law.
- The continuation of disarmament initiatives.
- The continuation of drug control efforts, crime prevention and the fight against "international terrorism in all its forms and manifestations."
- Other United Nations organisational, administrative and related matters.

On 26 June 2012, al-Nasser presided over a thematic debate on drugs, crime and development, including the overlapping of each facet.

Supplementary items

- Appointment of observer status for the Central European Initiative (as proposed by Italy, Montenegro, Serbia and Ukraine).
- Appointment of observer status for United Cities and Local Governments (as proposed by Turkey).
- Appointment of observer status for the Intergovernmental Authority on Development (as proposed by Ethiopia).
- Financing for the United Nations Interim Security Force for Abyei (as proposed by Secretary-General Ban Ki-moon).
- Financing for the United Nations Mission in South Sudan (as proposed by Secretary-General Ban Ki-moon).
- Appointment of observer status for the Parliamentary Assembly of Turkic-speaking Countries (as proposed by Azerbaijan).
- Promotion of a people's empowerment and a peace-centric development model (as proposed by Bangladesh).
- Appointment of observer status for the International Conference of Asian Political Parties (as proposed by Cambodia, Japan, Nepal, the Philippines, South Korea and Vietnam).

=== Recognition of Palestine ===
An UNGA vote on recognition for the state of Palestine is expected at the end of September. Expectations for an approval by a large majority are high. The wording of the resolution by the Fatah movement was crafted in such a way as to bring states doubtful of a vote to either support it or at least abstain. The draft does not state a recognition of Palestine under the 1967 borders, but instead asks for permanent borders to be negotiated based on the principle of 4 June 1967; a move that even elicited the support of some members of the rival Palestinian movement Hamas, who has previously said that recognition of the 1967 borders before a final-status deal would mean waiving the claim for the right of return of refugees. On 15 September, a senior Palestinian diplomat said that "we will make the final decision soon" when disputed Palestinian President Mahmoud Abbas "announce[s] the final decision." At the same time Riyad Mansour, the Palestinian permanent observer to the United Nations, reiterated the same statement in saying how the Palestinian would go forward with the move. "We have the right to join the international community as a full member...This campaign has this symbolic gesture of a chair, a set of Palestine to become a full members of the United Nations. This campaign went into different parts of the globe and they ended in New York." Basem Elmary, a coordinator for Palestine at the UN, said that U.S. opposition to the issue needing the involvement of direct negotiations with Israel was "the blackmail to us." A U.S. State Department spokesperson said that a veto against the vote should not be surprising.

The move also follows an aggressive and at least partially successful campaign by the Palestinians to court recognition in the build-up to the vote, including numerous Latin American countries. Several leaders said they would support Palestine's bid for statehood during the general debates, though US President Barack Obama called for direct dialogue, amidst earlier threats to veto the move in the Security Council. His Secretary of State Hillary Clinton was due to meet separately with both Abbas and Israeli Prime Minister Benjamin Netanyahu on the sidelines of the summit.

The bid was expected to be submitted on 23 September in the Security Council, even though the 129 member states that recognise Palestine constitute the necessary 2/3 majority; however approval needs nine of 15 of the SC votes, though the U.S. promised to veto the measure. It also follows Obama's widely condemned statement to the UNGA that the recognition should be bilaterally negotiated. Abbas's diplomatic advisor Majdi al-Khaldi said that though the Palestinians believed they could win the votes needed, "Three of the members of the Security Council (Bosnia, Gabon and Nigeria) are under pressure from the Americans." In turn, French President Nicolas Sarkozy suggested an alternative proposal temporarily non-member observer state status should be granted with a timetable for new negotiations to conclude in a year.

Palestine was, however, admitted as a full member state to UNESCO in October 2011 despite opposition by the United States and Israel, who both threatened and carried out the cutting of funds to the body.

== Resolutions ==
Resolutions have come before the UNGA between 16 September 2011 and 9 April 2012.

== Elections ==
The election of non-permanent members to the Security Council for 2012–2013 was held on 21 and 24 October 2011. Azerbaijan, Guatemala, Morocco, Pakistan and Togo were elected to the UNSC on the first day of voting; however the voting for the seat allocated to Eastern European states was carried over to a second day. Azerbaijan finally won on the seventeenth round of voting, following the withdrawal of Slovenia's candidacy.

On 24 October 2011, the Assembly elected 18 members of the Economic and Social Council for three-year terms beginning 1 January 2012. Belarus, Brazil, Burkina Faso, Cuba, Dominican Republic, El Salvador, Ethiopia, France, Germany, India, Indonesia, Ireland, Japan Lesotho, Libya, Nigeria, Spain and Turkey replaced Côte d'Ivoire, Estonia, France, Germany, Guatemala, Guinea‑Bissau, India, Japan, Malta, Mauritius, Morocco, Namibia, Peru, Saint Kitts and Nevis, Saudi Arabia, Spain, Switzerland and Venezuela. Hungary also relinquished the remainder of its term in favour of an "internal agreement" with Bulgaria, as did the Belgium and Norway in accordance with the Western Europe and Others group's rotation policy to be replaced by Netherlands and Switzerland. While many vacancies were deferred in its subsidiary bodies, some of them did have new members chosen by acclamation. The Executive Board of the World Food Programme had six new members for three-year terms starting on 1 January 2012: Zambia (African Group); China (Asian Group); Japan (Western European and Other Group); United Kingdom (Western European and Other Group); and the Czech Republic (Eastern European Group). Zimbabwe (African Group) was chosen for the Commission on Narcotic Drugs for a four-year term from 1 January 2012, with another African state's election being deferred. Nigeria (African Group) was chosen for the Commission on Crime Prevention and Criminal Justice for a three-year term beginning on 1 January 2012. Israel (Western Europe and Others Group) was chosen for the Commission on Sustainable Development for a term due to start immediately in 2011 until the close of the commission's twenty-first session in 2014. Sweden (Western Europe and Others Group) was chosen for the Commission on Science and Technology for Development for a term beginning immediately until 31 December 2014.

The triennial election of five judges to the International Court of Justice (ICJ) was held on 10 November, 22 November and 13 December 2011. In the first round of voting, the General Assembly and the Security Council concurrently and independently elected Giorgio Gaja (Italy), Hisashi Owada (Japan), Peter Tomka (Slovakia), and Xue Hanqin (China), but the two organs were deadlocked between two African candidates for the fifth available seat. Eventually the two organs elected Julia Sebutinde (Uganda), who had been endorsed by the African Union. The five judges elected in this session will serve nine-year terms beginning on 6 February 2012. A by-election to the ICJ was held on 27 April 2012; the Security Council and the General Assembly concurrently elected Dalveer Bhandari (India) over Florentino Feliciano (Philippines) by a vote of 122 and 13, respectively to replace Awn Shawkat Al-Khasawneh who resigned from the Court in 2011.

== End of session ==
Secretary-General Ban Ki-moon thanked outgoing President Nassir Abdulaziz Al-Nasser for his leadership of the session.

== See also ==
- List of UN General Assembly sessions
- List of General debates of the United Nations General Assembly
