= Citizens' Climate Lobby =

US climate advocacy organization

- Abbreviation: CCL
- Established: 2007 (19 years ago)
- Founder: Marshall L. Saunders
- Type: Advocacy group
- Purpose: Carbon fee and dividend
- Region served: Global
- Members: > 200,000 (568 active local chapters)
- Key people: George Shultz; James Hansen; Bob Inglis; Katharine Hayhoe; Sam Daley-Harris; Daniel Kammen
- Website: CitizensClimateLobby.org

Citizens' Climate Lobby (CCL) is an international grassroots environmental group that trains and supports volunteers to build relationships with their elected representatives in order to influence climate policy. The CCL is a registered 501(c)(4) with approximately $680,000 in revenue in the United States in 2018. Operating since 2007, the goal of CCL is to build political support across party lines to put a price on carbon, specifically a revenue-neutral carbon fee and dividend (CF&D) at the national level. CCL is supported by notable climate scientists James Hansen, Katharine Hayhoe, and Daniel Kammen. CCL's advisory board also includes former Secretary of State George P. Shultz, former US Representative Bob Inglis, actor Don Cheadle, and RESULTS founder Sam Daley-Harris.

Founded in the United States, the CCL has chapters in over 70 countries.

== Introduction ==
The Citizens' Climate Lobby is a non-partisan organization with members throughout the United States, Canada and other countries, which advocates for effective climate legislation. Its stated mission is to create the political will for a sustainable climate, while empowering individuals to exercise their personal and political power. With the international/US headquarters in Coronado, California, and a Canadian national office in Sudbury, Ontario, Citizens' Climate Lobby is composed of local volunteer groups who lobby their elected representatives and work through local outreach and media. Their goal is to cut greenhouse gas emissions and promote a transition to a renewable energy economy through a market-based approach: a revenue-neutral 'carbon fee and dividend' approach to pricing carbon pollution from fossil fuels, and simultaneously ending subsidies to fossil fuel companies. In the United States, using a market-based approach by putting a price on carbon is gaining support from both Republicans and Democrats. CCL believes that a revenue-neutral carbon fee and dividend is a bipartisan solution that would effectively address carbon emissions without relying on a complex regulatory approach.

== History ==
The Citizens' Climate lobby originated in the United States in 2007 after founder Marshall L. Saunders recognized the need for progressive climate legislation. Saunders, a successful businessman turned philanthropist, internationally recognized for his work in microcredit, became increasingly concerned about climate change. Saunders increasingly recognized that while it was necessary for individuals to change their own behavior in the face of climate change, it would never be enough; the time had come for Congress to discontinue subsidizing the fossil fuel industry. With ever-rising energy production and increased use Saunders believed effective legislation was necessary to cut carbon emissions, by putting a price on carbon.

Saunders coordinated his efforts to establish Citizens' Climate Lobby with RESULTS, an organization committed to helping volunteer organizations seeking legislative changes to become more effective. Groups of volunteers organized by electoral districts could work through local media and elected officials to build public support and political will for change. Citizens' Climate Lobby established its primary, interconnected goals – to achieve legislation at the federal level that would effectively mitigate climate change, to create widespread political will for a sustainable climate, and to empower citizens to better exercise their own political and personal will. United States leadership is widely seen as critical in international emissions reduction efforts, and particularly in carbon pricing, as this would encourage other countries to follow suit with similar legislation.

The Citizens' Climate Lobby held its first annual conference in 2009 in Washington, D.C., bringing together representatives from around the United States as well as several Canadians. These Canadians subsequently led the establishment of the organization within Canada in 2011, with the first chapter emerging in Sudbury, Ontario.

Since the initial development of Citizens' Climate Lobby, the group has rapidly grown and spread, from 3 local groups in 2007 to 327 groups in May 2016. They are located throughout the United States and Canada, and more recently branching out to other countries including Sweden, Bangladesh (both starting in 2013), Australia, Germany, India, Nepal, Panama, United Kingdom, Burundi, Brazil, Cameroon, Chile, France, Kenya, Iceland, Italy, Netherlands, New Zealand, Nigeria, Qatar, Poland, Romania, Portugal, Serbia, Scotland, Switzerland and Ukraine.

Volunteers in local chapters meet monthly for teleconference lectures by climate experts and communication with other groups, to discuss coordinated actions to be undertaken by members, to practice skills involved in lobbying politicians and dealing with media, and to plan local outreach. These activities support the ongoing goals of the organization and contribute to progress toward effective carbon pricing legislation.

== Proposed US legislation ==
Citizens' Climate Lobby proposes national legislation that would reduce US greenhouse gas emissions by placing a fee on carbon dioxide (CO_{2}) or equivalent gases. The fee would be levied against all fossil fuels at their point of entry into the economy. The revenue that would be collected would be 100% returned as a monthly or annual payment to every American household. This would protect low and middle class Americans from the rising consumer costs associated with the carbon fee. This idea is known as a carbon fee and dividend (CF&D).

CCL's proposal would start the fee at US$15 per ton of CO_{2} equivalent (3/4 cent per pound) and rise $10 per ton each year (1/2 cent per pound). The fee would continue to rise until total US CO_{2} equivalent emissions have been reduced to 10% of US CO_{2} equivalent emissions in 1990. To protect US businesses from competition from other countries that do not have carbon pricing mechanisms, a border adjustment would be enacted. Similar to the Montreal Protocol, goods coming from countries without a carbon price would be subjected to a fee at the border. Goods leaving the US for sale in a country without a carbon price would be reimbursed that fee at the border. In addition, all existing subsidies of fossil fuels, including tax credits, would be phased out over the five years following enactment.

On September 1, 2016, the California State Legislature passed a measure that urges the United States Congress to enact a tax on carbon-based fossil fuels. The proposal is revenue-neutral, with all money collected going to the bottom two-thirds of American households. So while the resolution is framed as a tax, it is in fact a carbon fee and dividend scheme.

Emeritus professor Henry Jacoby again argued for the CF&D concept in a Guardian article in early 2021.

=== Model policy in Canada ===
The Canadian province of British Columbia enacted a revenue-neutral carbon tax in 2008. The British Columbia carbon tax enabled so called "carbon funded tax cuts" because the revenue, instead of being returned as a dividend, is used to offset corporate and personal income taxes. In 2015, a review of British Columbia's emissions found that they had fallen 16% since 2008, while economic activity outperformed the rest of Canada. The policy has been called "popular across the political spectrum" and been considered a model for policies in other states and countries.

=== Proposed measure in Washington ===
In 2016, a group called CarbonWA, allied but unaffiliated with the Citizens Climate Lobby, submitted a carbon pricing measure to the ballot in the state of Washington. The initiative, known as Washington Initiative 732, would impose a steadily rising fee on emissions of carbon dioxide, and use that revenue to offset the state's sales tax, business tax, and to expand the state's version of the earned income tax credit.

=== Energy Innovation and Carbon Dividend Act ===
On November 27, 2018, Climate Solutions Caucus members Representatives Ted Deutch (D-FL), Francis Rooney (R-FL), Charlie Crist (D-FL), Brian Fitzpatrick (R-PA), and John Delaney (D-MD) introduced the Energy Innovation and Carbon Dividend Act (HR 7173). A few days later, a companion Senate bill was introduced by Senators Chris Coons (D-DE) and Jeff Flake (R-AZ).

The bill was reintroduced into the 116th Congress under the same name as HR 763. In 2021, it was reintroduced into the 117th United States Congress as H.R.2307. If passed, a national carbon fee and dividend would be implemented similar to that described above.

== Economic basis for action ==
Shultz was former secretary of state under President Ronald Reagan. Gary Becker is a Nobel laureate economist and economics professor at the University of Chicago. Greg Mankiw was Mitt Romney's former economic adviser. Nicholas Stern is chair of the Grantham Research Institute on Climate Change and the Environment at the London School of Economics and also chair of the Centre for Climate Change Economics and Policy (CCCEP) at Leeds University and LSE. Shi-Ling Hsu is the D'Alemberte Professor and Associate Dean for Environmental Programs, Florida State University College of Law.

Economist and law professor Shi-Ling Hsu also supports a revenue-neutral carbon tax. In his book The Case for a Carbon Tax, Getting Past our Hangups to Effective Climate Policy and in his talks, he explains the economics of carbon pricing and why he believes that putting a price on carbon in the form of a carbon tax is more effective and efficient than cap and trade or command and control style legislation.

=== Stern Review 2006 ===
Economist Nicholas Stern also supports putting a price on carbon as explained in his Stern Review. The Stern Review is significant in that it is the largest and most widely known and discussed economic report on climate change of its kind. Entitled Stern Review on the Economics of Climate Change, this 700-page report was released for the British government on October 30, 2006. In it, Stern discusses the effect of global warming on the world economy, and states that climate change is the greatest and widest-ranging market failure ever seen, presenting a unique challenge for economics. According to the Stern Review, without action, the overall costs of climate change will be equivalent to losing at least 5% of global gross domestic product (GDP) each year, now and forever. The Review provides prescriptions including environmental taxes to minimize the economic and social disruptions. The Stern Review's main conclusion is that the benefits of strong, early action on climate change far outweigh the costs of not acting. Some of the report's main conclusions are:

- The benefits of strong, early action on climate change outweigh the costs.
- The scientific evidence points to increasing risks of serious, irreversible impacts from climate change associated with business-as-usual (BAU) paths for emissions.
- Climate change threatens the basic elements of life for people around the world – access to water, food production, health, use of land and the environment.
- The impacts of climate change are not evenly distributed – the poorest countries and people will suffer earliest and most. And if and when the damages appear it will be too late to reverse the process. Thus we are forced to look a long way ahead.
- Emissions have been, and continue to be, driven by economic growth; yet stabilization of greenhouse gas concentration in the atmosphere is feasible and consistent with continued growth.
- Establishing a carbon price, through tax, trading or regulation, is an essential foundation for climate change policy.
- There is still time to avoid the worst impacts of climate change if strong collective action starts now.

=== Energy Modeling Forum study 2012 ===
In late 2012 the Energy Modeling Forum (EMF), coordinated by Stanford University, released its EMF 29 study titled "The role of border carbon adjustment in unilateral climate policy". It is well understood that unilateral climate policy can lead to emissions leakage. As one example, trade-exposed emissions-intensive industries may simply relocate to regions with laxer climate protection. A border carbon adjustment (BCA) program can help counter this and related effects. Under such a policy, tariffs are levied on the carbon embodied in imported goods from unregulated trading partners while the original climate protection payments for exported goods are rebated. The study finds that the BCA programs evaluated can reduce emissions leakage, can yield modest gains in global economic efficiency, and will shift substantial costs from abating OECD countries to non-abating non-OECD countries. This last finding is regressive and counter to the equity principles contained in the UNFCCC.

=== Regional Economic Models study 2014 ===
A private economic modeling company, Regional Economic Models, Inc (REMI), was commissioned by Citizens' Climate Lobby to conduct an objective analysis of the economic impacts of a revenue neutral carbon fee and dividend in the US. The study found that, if enacted in 2016, by 2036: US CO_{2} emissions would be reduced 50% below 1990 levels; because of the economic stimulus of recycling carbon fee revenue back to households 2.8 million jobs would be added to the American economy; improved air quality would result in 230,000 premature deaths avoided over that time period.

== Organizational structure ==
Citizens' Climate Lobby is a network involving its US, international and Canadian head offices, and the dedicated volunteers that comprise the various chapters throughout the United States and Canada and other countries. Until his death in December 2019, Marshall Saunders remained the organization's president alongside his wife, Pamela Saunders. Mark Reynolds is the group's executive director. Cathy Orlando serves as the program director for Citizens' Climate International.

Regional coordinators in the US regularly communicate with the local group leaders in their geographical region. Aside from the few paid staff members, the organization is run by thousands of volunteers. Often volunteers will initiate a new group by themselves, or with just one or two others, until they find enough other people nearby to formally start a new group. When a new group is started, orientation and training is provided through the respective national office.

Citizens' Climate Lobby is coordinated through regular email communication at all levels, monthly international teleconferences and group meetings, weekly international, national or regional group leader calls; national websites; social media communication at different levels.

The largest focal point each year is the Annual International Conference in June, which includes meeting with and lobbying as many members of Congress as possible in Washington, D.C. Canada's Citizens' Climate Lobby has in the past coordinated its annual meeting and lobbying activities in Ottawa with other organizations but held its first Annual Conference and Lobbying Days in November 2013.

Citizens' Climate Lobby additionally holds a smaller, secondary conference known as the Congressional Education day each November.

== Priorities and influence ==
The work of Citizens' Climate Lobby has an influence at the local and the national scale. At the local scale, Citizens' Climate Lobby brings concerned citizens together as a community to educate themselves and others, including through the media, and to create a voice on climate change to present to locally elected representatives of the federal government. This includes Members of the House of Representatives and Senators in the United States and Members of Parliament and Senators (appointed) in Canada.

Citizens' Climate Lobby believes it is important for members to meet and create a relationship with local representatives as a means of "putting a face" on local chapters and to provide information and state their concerns regarding climate change legislation. When there is an important climate bill being considered in the nation's capital, members of Citizens' Climate Lobby bring it to the attention of their elected representatives and lobby for their support as appropriate. The chapters also act to keep citizens informed about climate legislation and timely actions to take. Monthly local chapter meetings allow members to share information about climate change issues, to plan for upcoming events related to climate change and to provide mutual support.

Chapters aim to influence legislation at the national level via work at the local level. These chapters also aim to contribute to a large network of people across the country who share the same initiative, who together become a powerful voice to influence other citizens and politicians.

== Initiatives ==
Citizens' Climate Lobbyists create political will for a sustainable climate and empower others in many ways, including by:

- Educating themselves, their friends and people of influence about the science, economics, sociology, business, denial machine, politics, communication, and many other aspects of climate change. They sponsor weekly educational webinars, which are nicknamed Citizens' Climate University (CCU).
- Writing handwritten letters to politicians, especially Members of Congress, Parliament and National Assemblies, and recruiting others to do so.
- Lobbying politicians directly in their constituency offices and in the capital cities.
- Participating in community events where they engage the public in climate change awareness and actions.
- Creating awareness in the media by writing stories, blogs, media releases, letters to the editor, opinion editorials, tweets, status updates, etc., and submitting them to traditional (radio, TV, and newspapers) and 21st century sources (blogs, online magazine and social media).
- Developing partnerships, alliances and relationships with a range of groups towards building a broad and diverse base support which will create political will for a sustainable climate.

== Accomplishments ==
- The number of local groups has grown significantly, from 3 in 2007, 74 in 2012, and 568 in August 2022.
- Citizens' Climate Lobby has written a legislative proposal, The Carbon Fee and Dividend Act, introduced by Dr. James Hansen at an Earth Day rally on the National Mall in Washington.
- Published Letters to the Editor have grown from 646 in 2012 to 2,583 in 2014, to 3,574 in 2015, to 4,293 in 2020.
- Letters to Members of Congress have grown from 6,991 in 2014, to 40,990 in 2016, to 74,851 in 2017, to 98,886 in 2020 .
- Editorial Board meetings have grown from 24 in 2012 to 52 in 2014. Published Opinion Editorials (Op Eds) have grown from 87 in 2012 to 291 in 2014.
- Congressional Meetings have grown from 534 in 2012, to 1,086 in 2014, to 1387 in 2016.
- The annual international conference in Washington, D.C., has grown from 175 attendees in 2012, to 367 attendees in 2013, to over 1,300 attendees in 2017. In 2015, over 800 volunteers participated in 487 meetings with Congressional offices.
- Citizen Climate Lobby published an economic report, Building a Green Economy (September 2010) written by CCL member Joseph Robertson. The report is now used as a source with the media and Members of Congress.

== CCL International ==
Chapters of Citizens' Climate Lobby exist in multiple places outside of the United States, and advocate for revenue-neutral carbon fee and dividend in their respective countries.

=== Australia ===
Citizens' Climate Lobby Australia has helped create a Parliamentary Friends of Climate Action Group and trained hundreds of people who have gone on to meet with federal politicians and advisors. It has produced a guide for members and others regarding effective lobbying.

=== Canada ===
Canada's Citizens' Climate Lobby participates in many climate related projects and actions. Some of the initiatives to date include:

- Joining US volunteers at the Annual Conference/Lobbying in Washington, D.C., to meeting with Members of Congress.
- Meeting with Members of Parliament (Canada) and Members of provincial legislative assemblies (MLAs/MPPs/MHAs/MNAs) to discuss carbon fee and dividend policy and other climate issues.
- Working in collaboration with the Climate Action Network Canada to encourage Canada's government to remove fossil fuel subsidies and put a fair price on carbon pollution.
- Pushing for a Pan Canada Energy Strategy
- Participating in the Parliamentary Petition Project for a sustainable climate.
- Developing relationships and strategic partnerships with like-minded groups locally, provincially, nationally and internationally.

=== Germany ===
In Germany, CCL is known as Bürgerlobby Klimaschutz and abbreviated CCL-D. Like other CCL groups, CCL-D seek a steadily rising and socially equitable price on carbon. However their first focus is on overhauling the European Union Emissions Trading System (EU ETS) as follows:

- extend the EU ETS so that all emissions are covered and modify the annual cap so that 2030 emissions sink by at least 50% relative to 1990 levels
- introduce a continuously increasing floor price for CO_{2} allowances
- introduce a WTO compliant border adjustment system to level the playing field between European companies and their global competitors

As long as there is no effective price signal at the EU level, CCL-D call for a national carbon tax for Germany on all CO_{2} emissions as a transitional measure.

=== France ===
In France, CCL is known as Le Lobby Climatique Citoyen, founded in 2019. The association’s primary objective is the implementation of a fair carbon pricing mechanism, specifically supporting the expansion of the European carbon market (ETS 2) to cover road transport and heating by 2028, and the full redistribution of carbon revenues to households through a "Carbon Income".

=== Sweden ===
In Sweden, CCL is known as Klimatsvaret - CCL Sverige. As all CCL chapters, Klimatsvaret advocates a rising carbon fee with dividend, but emphasizes the need to include non-fossils sources of carbon dioxide in the fee. On the national level, Klimatsvaret proposes a revenue-neutral carbon fee on all fuels used in domestic transport, which are not currently covered by the European Union Emissions Trading System.

== Connections ==
Citizens' Climate Lobby is a non-partisan group that develops and maintains relationships with and may coordinate some activities with a broad base of organizations that share similar goals. In 2013, Bill McKibben, founder of 350.org, endorsed CCL by saying "I love working with Citizens' Climate Lobby—their relentless focus on the need for a fee-and-dividend solution is helping drive the debate in precisely the right direction. I'm enormously grateful for their persistence and creativity."

== See also ==
- Possible (charity) – a climate change campaign (formerly "10:10")
- 350.org
- Air pollution reduction efforts
- Avoiding Dangerous Climate Change – a 2005 conference on the topic
- Carbon fee and dividend
- Carbon price
- Climate change mitigation
- Climate change policy of the United States
- Climate movement
- Climate Solutions Caucus
- Conservation (ethic)
- Economic analysis of climate change
- Environmental movement
- Garnaut Climate Change Review
- Individual and political action on climate change
- List of environmental issues
- Politics of global warming
- Stern Review
- World Energy Outlook
