= 2011 United Nations Security Council election =

Election to the United Nations Security Council

- 21 and 24 October 2011

5 of 10 non-permanent seats on the United Nations Security Council
- United Nations Security Council membership after the election Permanent members Non-permanent members
- Outgoing members Gabon (Africa) Nigeria (Africa) Lebanon (Asia–Pacific)^{a} Brazil (GRULAC) Bosnia and Herzegovina (EEG) a. Arab state Elected members Togo (Africa) Morocco (Africa)^{a} Pakistan (Asia–Pacific) Guatemala (GRULAC) Azerbaijan (EEG)

- Unsuccessful candidates
- Fiji (Asia–Pacific)
- Hungary (EEG)
- Kyrgyzstan (Asia–Pacific)
- Mauritania (Africa)
- Slovenia (EEG)

The 2011 United Nations Security Council election was held on 21 and 24 October 2011 during the Sixty-sixth session of the United Nations General Assembly, held at United Nations Headquarters in New York City. The General Assembly elected Azerbaijan, Guatemala, Morocco, Pakistan, and Togo, as the five new non-permanent members of the UN Security Council for two-year mandates commencing on 1 January 2012. Azerbaijan was elected after 17 rounds on 24 October, while the other four new members were chosen on 21 October.

Notably, Azerbaijan and Guatemala were elected to the Council for the first time.

== Rules ==
The Security Council has 15 seats, filled by five permanent members and ten non-permanent members. Each year, half of the non-permanent members are elected for two-year terms. A sitting member may not immediately run for re-election.

In accordance with the rules whereby the ten non-permanent UNSC seats rotate among the various regional blocs into which UN member states traditionally divide themselves for voting and representation purposes, the five available seats are allocated as follows:

- Two for the African Group (held by Gabon and Nigeria), with one of them being the "Arab swing seat"
- One for the Asia-Pacific Group (previously called the Asian Group), (held by Lebanon)
- One for the Latin American and Caribbean Group (held by Brazil)
- One for the Eastern European Group (held by Bosnia and Herzegovina)

To be elected, a candidate must receive a two-thirds majority of those present and voting. If the vote is inconclusive after the first round, three rounds of restricted voting shall take place, followed by three rounds of unrestricted voting, and so on, until a result has been obtained. In restricted voting, only official candidates may be voted on, while in unrestricted voting, any member of the given regional group, with the exception of current Council members, may be voted on.

== Candidates ==
Guatemala indicated it would run for the 2012–2013 term, for the seat currently occupied by Brazil. At that time, Guatemala was one of only six original UN Members to have never held a seat on the Security Council.

Azerbaijan, Hungary, and Slovenia all announced their intention to run for the single Eastern European seat. Though Armenia did not run for the seat, the Azerbaijani Trend news agency had previously reported about an Armenian withdrawal of its bid, while reading the alleged candidature as "certainly viewed as Armenia's defeat". The Arab League indicated it would support Azerbaijan's candidature.

Mauritania, Morocco and Togo sought to be elected to the two African seats.

Pakistan had announced its intention to run for the single Asian seat in October 2010. A Pakistani diplomat noted that Pakistan had supported India's candidacy for a non-permanent seat in the 2010 election, and hoped that India would support Pakistan's candidacy in 2011. Fiji had originally sought to run for the seat, but deferred in Pakistan's favour. Kyrgyzstan has also made known its candidacy on 22 September 2011.

== Result ==
=== African and Asia-Pacific Groups ===
African and Asia-Pacific States election results
Member	Round 1	Round 2	Round 3
Morocco	151	—	—
Pakistan	129	—	—
Togo	119	119	131
Mauritania	98	72	61
Kyrgyzstan	55	—	—
Fiji	1	—	—
valid ballots	193	193	193
abstentions	0	2	1
present and voting	193	191	192
required majority	129	128	128

Fiji had already withdrawn its campaign in favour of Pakistan before the election.

=== Latin American and Caribbean Group ===
Latin American and Caribbean Group election results
Member	Round 1
Guatemala	191
valid ballots	193
abstentions	2
present and voting	191
required majority	128

=== Eastern European Group ===
==== Day 1 ====
Eastern European Group election results – day one
Member	Round 1	Round 2	Round 3	Round 4	Round 5	Round 6	Round 7	Round 8	Round 9
Azerbaijan	74	90	93	93	93	96	100	110	113
Slovenia	67	97	99	98	98	95	91	80	77
Hungary	52	—	—	—	1	—	—	—	—
Estonia	—	—	—	—	—	1	1	—	—
valid ballots	193	188	193	192	193	193	193	191	191
invalid ballots	0	5	0	0	0	0	0	0	0
abstentions	0	1	1	1	1	1	1	1	1
present and voting	193	187	192	191	192	192	192	190	190
required majority	129	125	128	128	128	128	128	127	127

After eight rounds of inconclusive voting, General Assembly President Nassir Abdulaziz al-Nasser initially decided to reschedule the next round of voting for 24 October following the election of members to the Economic and Social Council. However, Azerbaijan requested the ballot be continued for one more hour; the request was agreed to after Russian support despite opposition from France on the basis of a lack of translation services.

Though Estonia had not applied as a candidate, the 6th and 7th rounds, which were unrestricted, each featured one vote for them.

==== Day 2 ====
Eastern European Group election results – day two
Member	Round 10	Round 11	Round 12	Round 13	Round 14	Round 15	Round 16	Round 17
Azerbaijan	110	110	111	111	110	117	116	155
Slovenia	83	82	81	80	81	76	77	13
Hungary	—	—	—	—	—	—	—	1
valid ballots	193	193	193	192	192	193	193	193
abstentions	0	1	1	1	1	0	0	24
present and voting	193	192	192	191	191	193	193	169
required majority	129	128	128	128	128	129	129	113

After seven additional inconclusive rounds of voting on 24 October, Slovenia's delegation told the General Assembly that while it believed Slovenia would be a good addition for the Security Council, it did not approve of the way in which the election was being held and was withdrawing its candidacy, observing that "the current result speaks for itself and the object of this body’s support is obvious". In the 17th round that followed, Azerbaijan achieved the necessary 2/3 majority and won the Eastern European seat.

== Ramifications ==
With the election of Pakistan to the Security Council, seven of the nine countries known to have nuclear weapons were members of the Council in 2012: China, France, India, Pakistan, Russia, the United States and the United Kingdom. (The two nuclear powers not on the Council in 2012 were Israel and North Korea.)

== See also ==
- European Union and the United Nations
- Fiji and the United Nations
- List of members of the United Nations Security Council
- Pakistan and the United Nations
