= General debate of the sixty-sixth session of the United Nations General Assembly =

United Nations General Debate Assembly

General Debate of the sixty-sixth session of the United Nations General Assembly
- 21 – 27 September 2011 66th session 66th general debate

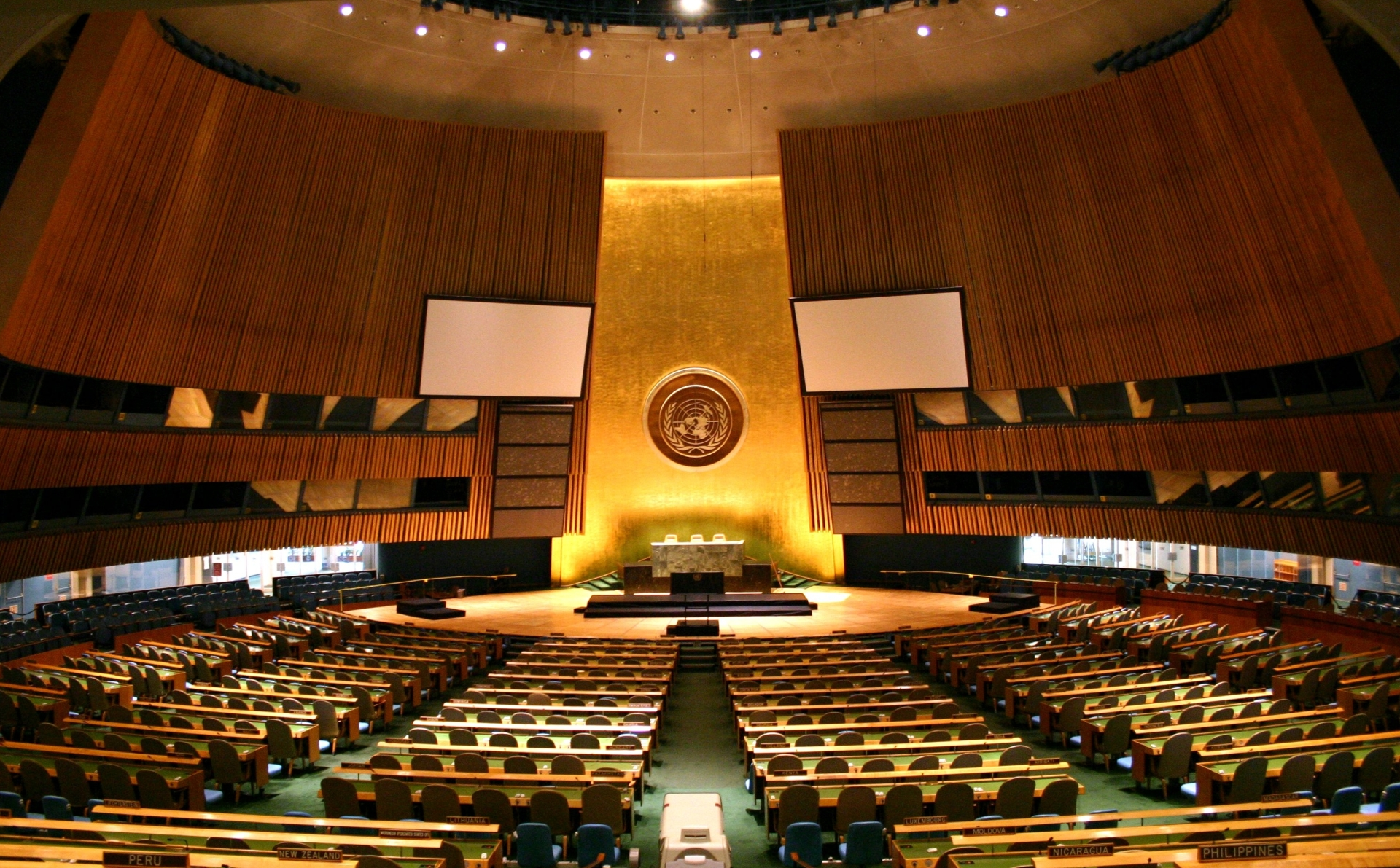
- General Assembly Hall at United Nations Headquarters, New York City
- Host country: United Nations
- Cities: New York City, United States
- Venues: General Assembly Hall at the United Nations Headquarters
- Participants: United Nations Member States
- President: Nassir Abdulaziz Al-Nasser
- Secretary-General: Ban Ki-moon
- Website: gadebate.un.org/en/sessions-archive/66

The general debate of the sixty-sixth session of the United Nations General Assembly was the first debate of the 66th session of the United Nations General Assembly that ran from 21 – 27 September 2011. Leaders from the United Nations' member states addressed the General Assembly concerning topics of national, regional and international importance.

== Organisation ==
The speaking order of the general debate is different from the speaking order of other General Assembly debates. For the general debate, the Secretary-General speaks first delivering their "Report of the Secretary-General on the work of the Organization, " they are then followed by: the President of the General Assembly who opens the general debate, the delegate from Brazil and the delegate from the United States of America. After this, the order is first given to Member States, then Observer States and supranational bodies. For all other Member States, speaking order is based on their level of representation at the general debate, order preference and other criteria such as geographic balance.

According to the rules in place for the general debate, statements should be made in one of the United Nations' official languages of Arabic, Chinese, English, French, Russian or Spanish, and are translated by United Nations translators. Additionally, speakers are usually limited to a 15-minute time limit in order to comply with the schedule set up by the General Committee. Member States are also advised to provide 350 paper copies of their statements in order for them to be distributed to other Member States, as well as to translation services.

The theme for the 66th Session was chosen by President Nassir Abdulaziz Al-Nasser as: "The role of mediation in the settlement of disputes by peaceful means." The theme of a Session is typically suggested by the President-elect of the General Assembly prior to their inauguration and the beginning of the Session, and is decided upon via informal discussions with Member States, the current President of the General Assembly and the Secretary-General. This theme is then communicated to Member States in a letter, whereupon the Member States are invited to focus their general debate speeches on the proposed theme.

== Speaking schedule ==
=== 21 September 2011 ===
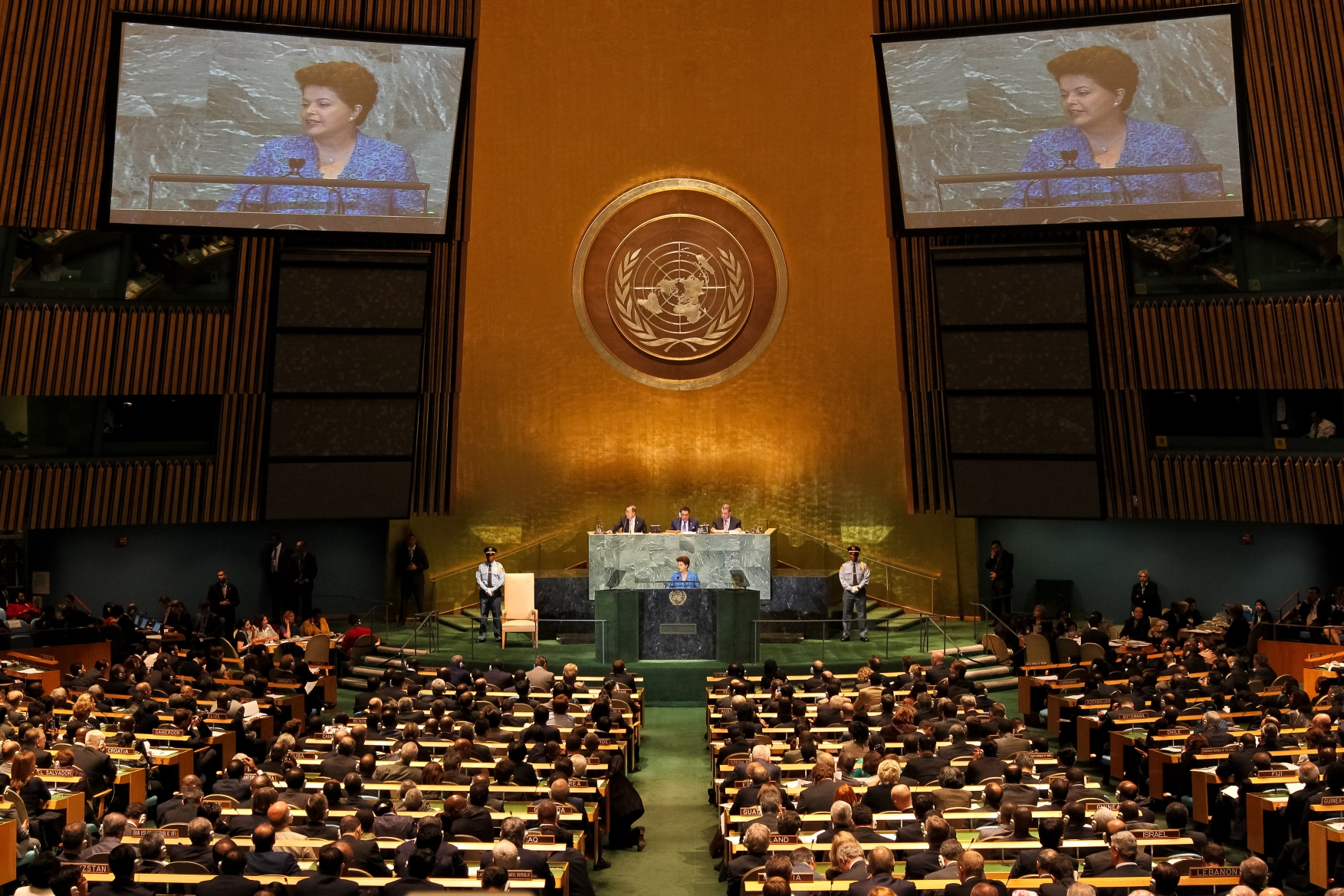
President of Brazil Dilma Rousseff became the first woman to open the general debate.

Morning schedule

- United Nations – Secretary-General Ban Ki-moon (Report of the Secretary-General on the work of the Organization)
- United Nations – President of the 66th Session Nassir Abdulaziz Al-Nasser (Opening)
- Brazil – President Dilma Rousseff (Note: Rousseff became the first ever women to open the General Debate.)
- United States – President Barack Obama
- Qatar – Amir Hamad bin Khalifa Al-Thani
- Mexico – President Felipe Calderón Hinojosa
- Kazakhstan – President Nursultan Nazarbayev
- France – President Nicolas Sarkozy
- Argentina – President Cristina Fernández de Kirchner
- Lebanon – President Michel Sleiman
- Republic of Korea – President Lee Myung-bak
- Equatorial Guinea – President Teodoro Obiang Nguema Mbasogo
- Jordan – King King Abdullah II
- Finland – President Tarja Halonen
- Colombia – President Juan Manuel Santos Calderón
- Nigeria – President Goodluck Ebele Jonathan
- Estonia – President Toomas Hendrik Ilves
- Switzerland – President Micheline Calmy-Rey

Afternoon session

- Honduras – President Porfirio Lobo Sosa
- Ukraine – President Viktor Yanukovych
- Paraguay – President Fernando Lugo Méndez
- Rwanda – President Paul Kagame
- Bosnia and Herzegovina – Chair of the Presidency Željko Komšić
- Guyana – President Bharrat Jagdeo
- Mongolia – President Elbegdorj Tsakhia
- South Africa – President Jacob Zuma
- Latvia – President Andris Bērziņš
- Guatemala – President Álvaro Colom Caballeros
- Senegal – President Abdoulaye Wade
- Mozambique – President Armando Emilio Guebuza
- Bolivia (Plurinational State of) – President Evo Morales Ayma
- Slovenia – President Danilo Türk

=== 22 September 2011 ===
Morning schedule

- Cyprus – President Demetris Christofias
- United Republic of Tanzania – President Jakaya Mrisho Kikwete
- Bahrain – King Hamad bin Isa Al Khalifa
- Côte d'Ivoire – President Alassane Ouattara
- Chile – President Sebastián Piñera Echeñique
- Iran (Islamic Republic of) – President Mahmoud Ahmadinejad
- Kyrgyzstan – President Roza Otunbaeva
- Kuwait – Sheikh Nasser Mohammed Al-Ahmed Al-Sabah
- United Kingdom of Great Britain and Northern Ireland – Prime Minister David Cameron
- European Union – President of the European Council Herman Van Rompuy (Note: This was the first ever speech by the EU President and South Sudan at the General Assembly's general debate.)
- Turkey – Prime Minister Recep Tayyip Erdoğan

Afternoon session

- Poland – President Bronislaw Komorowski
- Kenya – President Mwai Kibaki
- Georgia – President Mikheil Saakashvili
- Dominican Republic – President Leonel Fernández Reyna
- Peru – President Ollanta Humala Tasso
- Lithuania – President Dalia Grybauskaitė
- Zimbabwe – President Robert Mugabe
- Suriname – President Desiré Delano Bouterse
- Gabon – President Ali Bongo Ondimba
- Democratic Republic of Congo – President Joseph Kabila Kabange
- Palau – President Johnson Toribiong
- Chad – President Idriss Déby Itno
- Croatia – President Ivo Josipović
- Costa Rica – President Laura Chinchilla Miranda
- Australia – Foreign Minister Kevin Rudd
- Afghanistan – Foreign Minister Zalmai Rassoul

=== 23 September 2011 ===
Morning schedule

- Ghana – President John Evans Atta Mills
- Iraq – President Jalal Talabani
- Czech Republic – President Václav Klaus
- Turkmenistan – President Gurbanguly Berdimuhamedov
- El Salvador – President Carlos Mauricio Funes Cartagena
- Sri Lanka – President Mahinda Rajapaksa
- Djibouti – President Ismaël Omar Guelleh
- Namibia – President Hifikepunye Pohamba
- South Sudan – President Salva Kiir
- Armenia – President Serzh Sargsyan
- Palestine (State of) – Acting President Mahmoud Abbas (Note: The President of Palestine was under dispute between Fatah and Hamas at the time of the speech.) (Note: Abbas told the chamber that he submitted Palestine's application for full membership to the UN Secretary-General amidst a standing ovation.)
- Japan – Prime Minister Yoshihiko Noda
- Bhutan – Prime Minister Lyonchen Jigmi Yoser Thinley
- Israel – Prime Minister Benjamin Netanyahu
- Sweden – Prime Minister Fredrik Reinfeldt

Afternoon schedule

- Hungary – President Pál Schmitt
- Sierra Leone – President Ernest Bai Koroma
- Serbia – President Boris Tadić
- Guinea – President Alpha Condé
- Eritrea – President Isaias Afwerki
- Nauru – President Marcus Stephen
- Niger – President Mahamadou Issoufou
- Haiti – President Michel Joseph Martelly
- Burundi – President Pierre Nkurunziza
- Micronesia (Federated States of) – President Emanuel Mori
- Comoros – President Ikililou Dhoinine
- Kiribati – President Anote Tong
- Madagascar – President Andry Nirina Rajoelina
- Fiji – Prime Minister Josaia V. Bainimarama
- Mali – Prime Minister Cissé Mariam Kaïdama Sidibé
- Swaziland – Prime Minister Barnabas Sibusiso Dlamini
- Grenada – Prime Minister Tillman Thomas
- Timor-Leste – Prime Minister Xanana Gusmão
- Greece – Foreign Minister Stavros Lambrinidis
- Bulgaria – Foreign Minister Nickolay Mladenov

=== 24 September 2011 ===
Morning schedule

- Lesotho – Prime Minister Pakalitha Bethuel Mosisili
- Montenegro – Prime Minister Igor Lukšić
- Slovakia – Prime Minister Iveta Radičová
- India – Prime Minister Manmohan Singh
- Guinea-Bissau – Prime Minister Carlos Gomes Júnior
- Tuvalu – Prime Minister Willy Telavi
- Saint Vincent and the Grenadines – Prime Minister Ralph Gonsalves
- Nepal – Prime Minister Baburam Bhattarai
- Mauritius – Prime Minister Navinchandra Ramgoolam
- Albania – Prime Minister Sali Berisha
- The former Yugoslav Republic of Macedonia – Prime Minister Nikola Gruevski
- Antigua and Barbuda – Prime Minister Winston Baldwin Spencer
- Bangladesh – Prime Minister Sheikh Hasina
- Barbados – Prime Minister Freundel Stuart
- Libya – Chairman Mahmoud Jibril
- Malta – Prime Minister Lawrence Gonzi
- Egypt – Foreign Minister Mohamed Kamel Amr (On behalf of the Non-Aligned Movement)
- Portugal – Prime Minister Pedro Passos Coelho

Afternoon schedule

- Cape Verde – Prime Minister José Maria Pereira Neves
- Papua New Guinea – Prime Minister Peter O'Neill
- Samoa – Prime Minister Tuilaepa Sailele Malielegaoi
- Vanuatu – Prime Minister Meltek Sato Kilman Livtunvanu
- Solomon Islands – Prime Minister Danny Philip
- Tonga – Prime Minister Sialeʻataongo Tuʻivakanō
- Somalia – Prime Minister Abdiweli Mohamed Ali
- Togo – Prime Minister Gilbert Fossoun Houngbo
- Austria – Vice Chancellor Michael Spindelegger
- Luxembourg – Foreign Minister Jean Asselborn
- Belgium – Deputy Prime Minister Steven Vanackere
- Saint Kitts and Nevis – Deputy Prime Minister Sam Terrence Condor
- Italy – Foreign Minister Franco Frattini
- Spain – Foreign Minister Trinidad Jiménez
- Cameroon – Foreign Minister Henri Eyebe Ayissi

==== Right of reply ====
Member states have the option to reply to comments on the day (or even to the days prior), but are limited to 10 minutes for the first response and five minutes for the second response.

Serbia (First)

Serbia used its Right of Reply to respond to statements made by Albania in its general debate speech before the Assembly. Albania, in its speech, brought up the topic of Kosovo, and its independence movement. Specifically, Albania called upon Serbia to recognize, and comply, with the International Court of Justice and its 2010 decision which stated that Kosovo's declaration of independence did not violate international law. Albania also called upon all Member States to recognize the independence of Kosovo. Finally, Albania mentioned that the Government of Kosovo was committed to implementing the rule of law, but was being met with resistance from criminal groups and organized gangs in Serbian towns in the north of the country.

Serbia responded by stating that Albania's statement was full of "misrepresentations and falsehoods." First, Serbia pointed out that Kosovo had taken various coercive actions in order to create fait accompli on issues on which negotiations were still pending, creating tension and conflict that endangered the negotiation process. Additionally, Serbia stated that Albania had misrepresented the ICJ's ruling. Albania stated that the declaration was found by the Court to be "in full compliance with international law," when in reality the Court found that "general international law contains no applicable prohibition of declarations of independence." Serbia posited that the Court left the real question unanswered. Finally, Serbia claimed that Serbian cultural heritage in Kosovo was not as secure as Albania stated, as in 2004 over 30 Christian Orthodox churches were destroyed, with the remaining churches being routinely desecrated.

Albania (First)

Albania used its Right of Reply to respond to Serbia's Right of Reply. It began by stating that an ever-growing number of Member States were convinced that an independent Kosovo was the only solution for the war-torn region. Albania then reiterated that the ICJ ruling stated that the declaration of independence did not violate any provision of international law and that Serbia was expected to accept and respect the Court's findings as laid out in Chapter XIV of the United Nations Charter. It then mentioned a speech made by German Chancellor Angela Merkel in which she called upon Serbia to implement agreements with Kosovo, allow the European Union Rule of Law Mission in Kosovo (EULEX) to operate in the entire territory of Kosovo, and abolish the parallel structures in the North. Albania finished by calling on Serbia to accept the findings of the EULEX investigation.

Serbia (Second)

Serbia stated that its delegation was finished with the Kosovo issue and did not want to continue the debate and left the Member States to draw their own conclusions.

Albania (Second)

Albania agreed as it did not want to prolong the discussion.

=== 26 September 2011 ===
Morning schedule

- Botswana – Vice President Mompati S. Merafhe
- Maldives – Vice President Mohamed Waheed Hassan
- Liberia – Vice President Joseph Boakai
- Uruguay – Vice President Danilo Astori
- Gambia – Vice President Aja Isatou Njie-Saidy
- Uganda – Vice President Edward Kiwanuka Ssekandi
- Brunei Darussalam – Crown Prince Haji Al-Muhtadee Billah
- Cambodia – Foreign Minister Hor Namhong
- Ireland – Deputy Prime Minister Eamon Gilmore
- Jamaica – Deputy Prime Minister Kenneth Baugh
- Bahamas – Deputy Prime Minister Brent Symonette
- Ethiopia – Deputy Prime Minister Hailemariam Desalegn
- Laos – Deputy Prime Minister Thongloun Sisoulith
- China – Foreign Minister Yang Jiechi
- Morocco – Foreign Minister Taieb Fassi Fihri
- Germany – Foreign Minister Guido Westerwelle
- Oman – Foreign Minister Yusuf bin Alawi bin Abdullah
- (Syrian Arab Republic – Foreign Minister Walid Muallem

Afternoon schedule

- Uzbekistan – Foreign Minister Elyor Ganiyev
- Iceland – Foreign Minister Össur Skarphéðinsson
- Algeria – Foreign Minister Mourad Medelci
- United Arab Emirates – Sheikh Abdullah Bin Zayed Al Nahyan
- Tajikistan – Foreign Minister Hamrokhon Zarifi
- Monaco – Foreign Minister José Badia
- Cuba – Foreign Minister Bruno Rodríguez Parrilla
- Netherlands – Foreign Minister Uri Rosenthal
- Sudan – Foreign Minister Ali Ahmed Karti
- Sao Tome and Principe – Foreign Minister Manuel Salvador dos Ramos
- Tunisia – Foreign Minister Mouldi Kefi
- Indonesia – Foreign Minister Marty Natalegawa
- Canada – Foreign Minister John Baird
- Liechtenstein – Foreign Minister Aurelia Frick
- Nicaragua – Foreign Minister Samuel Santos López
- Congo – Foreign Minister Basile Ikouebe
- Angola – Foreign Minister Georges Rebelo Chikoti
- Marshall Islands – Foreign Minister John M. Silk
- Central African Republic – Foreign Minister Antoine Gambi
- Trinidad and Tobago – Foreign Minister Surujrattan Rambachan
- Andorra – Foreign Minister Gilbert Saboya Sunyé

==== Right of reply ====
Member states have the option to reply to comments on the day (or even to the days prior), but are limited to 10 minutes for the first response and five minutes for the second response.

Iran (Islamic Republic of)

Iran used its Right of Reply to respond to statements made by the United Arab Emirates in its general debate speech before the Assembly. In its speech, the UAE called the occupation by Iran of Abu Musa and the Greater and Lesser Tunbs illegitimate. It further stated that it had taken action to resolve the issue and hoped to resolve it through direct bilateral negotiations or by referral to the International Court of Justice. Furthermore, the UAE expressed concern over the lack of progress in resolving the issue. Finally, it condemned actions taken by Iran that aimed at changing the legal, physical and demographic situation of the islands, calling these actions a violation of international law, as well as of the United Nations Charter. It finished by calling on Iran to enter into serious and direct negotiations.

Iran responded by stating that the islands were "an eternal part of Iranian territory and are under the sovereignty of the Islamic Republic of Iran." It further stated that all actions taken on the Iranian island of Abu Musa had been in exercise of its sovereign rights and were in accordance with documents exchanged in 1971 between Iran and the Emirate of Sharjah. Iran alsostated it was ready to continue bilateral talks with the United Arab Emirates with a view to removing any misunderstanding that may exist in regard to the islands. Finally, Iran stated that the only correct and universally recognized name for the sea between Iran and the Arabian peninsula is the Persian Gulf, as recognized by the United Nations itself.

Egypt

Egypt used its Right of Reply to respond to statements made by Canada in its general debate speech before the Assembly. In its speech, Canada stated that Member States had the duty to defend the vulnerable, to challenge aggression and to protect and promote human rights and human dignity. Specifically, it called for the protection of various groups, including Copts in Egypt, which it claimed were "being assaulted and killed."

Egypt responded by calling these allegations "utterly false". It called upon Canada to more closely examine events of the Egyptian revolution of 2011 and the social solidarity that it created in Egypt. More specifically, Egypt claimed that during the revolution Muslims and Copts stood together, side by side, and that since 25 January 2011, no Copt has been harassed and no church been trespassed. Finally, Egypt stated that Canada baselessly considered itself a custodian of human rights in the world.

United Arab Emirates

The UAE used its Right of Reply to respond to Iran's Right of Reply. The UAE stated that Iran was misleading the Assembly about its occupation of three islands belonging to the Emirates. It further stated that Iran's position on the issue was contrary to "all documentation and all historic, demographic and legal facts and realities," which prove that the islands were an integral part of the territory of the United Arab Emirates. Furthermore, the UAE rejected Iranian occupation and all military and civilian measures taken on the islands in attempts to consolidate their occupation and circumvent the question of occupation. This rejection was based on the purposes and principles of the Charter of the United Nations and the rules of international law. Finally, the UAE called upon the international community to urge Iran to enter into bilateral negotiations, or to pressure it into petitioning the International Court of Justice for its legal opinion on the matter.

=== 27 September 2011 ===
Morning schedule

- Mauritania – Foreign Minister Hamady Ould Hamady
- San Marino – Foreign Minister Antonella Mularoni
- Singapore – Foreign Minister K. Shanmugam
- Belarus – Foreign Minister Sergei Martynov
- Yemen – Foreign Minister Abu Bakr al-Kurbi
- Russian Federation – Foreign Minister Sergey Lavrov
- Belize – Foreign Minister Wilfred Elrington
- Burkina Faso – Foreign Minister Djibrill Ypènè Bassolé
- Myanmar – Foreign Minister Wunna Maung Lwin
- Viet Nam – Foreign Minister Phạm Bình Minh
- Azerbaijan – Foreign Minister Elmar Mammadyarov
- Malaysia – Foreign Minister Dato Sri Anifah Aman
- Malawi – Foreign Minister Arthur Peter Mutharika
- Thailand – Foreign Minister Surapong Tovichakchaikul
- Benin – Foreign Minister Nassirou Bako Arifari
- Holy See – Secretary for Relations with States Dominique Mamberti

Afternoon schedule

- Venezuela (Bolivarian Republic of) – Foreign Minister Nicolás Maduro Moros
- Pakistan – Foreign Minister Hina Rabbani Khar
- Democratic People's Republic of Korea – Deputy Foreign Minister Pak Kil-yon
- Romania – Deputy Foreign Minister Romulus Doru Costea
- Panama – Deputy Foreign Minister Francisco Alvarez de Soto
- Norway – Deputy Foreign Minister Espen Barth Eide
- Zambia – Permanent Representative Lucy Mungoma
- Republic of Moldova – Permanent Representative Alexandru Cujba
- Ecuador – Permanent Representative Francisco Carrión-Mena
- New Zealand – Permanent Representative Jim McLay
- Philippines – Permanent Representative Libran N. Cabactulan
- Dominica – Permanent Representative Vince Henderson
- Saint Lucia – Permanent Representative Donatus Keith St. Aimee
- Denmark – Permanent Representative Carsten Staur
- United Nations – President of the 66th Session Nassir Abdulaziz Al-Nasser (Closing)

==== Right of reply ====
Member states have the option to reply to comments on the day (or even to the days prior), but are limited to 10 minutes for the first response and five minutes for the second response.

Sri Lanka

Sri Lanka used its Right of Reply to respond to statements made by Canada in its general debate speech before the Assembly.

In its speech, Canada stated that the objectives of the United Nations were imperiled when its members observed its founding principles in word but not in deed. Such as when "objection is taken on petty, procedural or process-based grounds to reporting that speaks about credible allegations of war crimes committed in Sri Lanka."

Sri Lanka responded by stating that it was anguished by Canada's remarks, especially since it had made extensive efforts to keep the Canadian delegation to the Human Rights Council informed as to the reasons for Sri Lanka's objections to the Canadian initiative on an interactive dialogue on the reconciliation commission process following the Sri Lankan Civil War. It further stated that in the United Nations system procedure and process are important to ensure good governance and equity, as well as to prevent the organization from being abused for narrow, domestic political advantage.

Armenia

Armenia used its Right of Reply to respond to statements made by Azerbaijan in its general debate speech before the Assembly.

In its speech, Azerbaijan stated that Armenia was in violation of the United Nations Charter and other documents of international law by perpetrating aggression against the sovereignty and territorial integrity of Azerbaijan. It then mentioned that Armenia was in violation of four separate Security Council resolutions that demanded Armenia withdraw from occupied Azerbaijani territory. Azerbaijan then stated that Armenia continued to publicly incite future generations to support violence, and that the implantation of ethnic Armenian settlers in Azerbaijan was another source of serious concern. Finally, it mentioned the findings of a visit of the OSCE Minsk Group in October 2010 that stated that the status quo of the occupation was unacceptable and urged Armenia to put an end to its illegal practices, it further urged the international community to convince Armenian to respect the generally accepted norms and principles of international law.

Armenia responded by stating that the comments made by Azerbaijan were akin to cold war-style propaganda and that these statements were only made in an attempt to strengthen Azerbaijan's position in the efforts of the Minsk Group to find a comprehensive settlement to the Nagorno Karabakh issue. Armenia then said that Azerbaijan was preaching adherence to international law while taking it upon themselves to interpret the United Nations Charter, as well as statements made by Armenian President Serzh Sargsyan. It further accused Azerbaijan of misinterpreting the field assessment mission report of the Minsk Group in order to justify its militaristic rhetoric and move the discussions on the Nagorno Karabakh conflict to other forums. Armenia then stated that none of the Security Council resolutions mentioned by Azerbaijan contained a single word on Armenian aggression, nor do they mention withdrawal of Armenian military forces from Nagorno Karabakh. It then accused Azerbaijan of fabricating the number of refugees created by the conflict as 1 million as theses numbers could not be corroborated by any international organization, further accusing it of attempting to mislead the international community. Armenia finished by adding that it was intent on resolving the dispute through peaceful means.

Azerbaijan

Azerbaijan used its Right of Reply to respond to Armenia's Right of Reply. It began by stating that Armenia's statements displayed their disregard for its obligations under the Charter of the United Nations and international law. It then stated that it was ironic that Armenia would attempt to criticize Azerbaijan on notions of peace and human rights, when it was responsible for unleashing a war of aggression against Azerbaijan. Azerbaijan then called the so-called exercise of the right to self-determination by the Armenian ethnic minority living in Azerbaijan an illegal use of force against the sovereignty and territorial integrity of Azerbaijan. It then accused the government of Armenia of purging ethnic non-Armenians out of its own territory, as well as the occupied areas of Azerbaijan under its control in an attempt to create a mono-ethnic culture. Azerbaijan also posited that increased attacks on Azerbaijani civilians and civilian objects, as well as an increase in hostile statements by the Armenian leadership posed a direct threat to the peace, security and stability of the region. It finished by stating that it was sure that Armenia's destructive political agenda was fated to never be realized and that it would eventually be forced to establish civilized relations with all countries of the region.

== See also ==
- List of UN General Assembly sessions
- List of General debates of the United Nations General Assembly
