= Climate Solutions Caucus =

US legislators for climate solutions

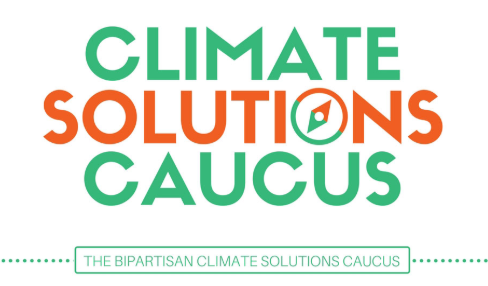
- Co-Chairs: Andrew Garbarino (R); Chrissy Houlahan (D)
- Founded: February 8, 2016; 10 years ago
- Ideology: Centrism
- Political position: Center
- Seats in the House Democratic Caucus: 29 / 212
- Seats in the House Republican Caucus: 29 / 219
- Seats in the House: 64 / 435
- Seats in the Senate Democratic Caucus: 7 / 47
- Seats in the Senate Republican Caucus: 6 / 53
- Seats in the Senate: 13 / 100

Website
- climatesolutionscaucus-garbarino.house.gov www.coons.senate.gov/climate-solutions-caucus/

The Climate Solutions Caucus is a bipartisan caucus of U.S. legislators supported by the Citizens' Climate Lobby whose members work to achieve action addressing the risks from climate change. The House of Representatives and Senate each have a caucus. The House caucus was founded in February 2016, during the 114th Congress, by representatives Carlos Curbelo (R-FL) and Ted Deutch (D-FL). The Senate Caucus was founded in 2019 by senators Mike Braun (R-IN) and Chris Coons (D-DE).

On November 27, 2018, House caucus members Ted Deutch (D-FL), Francis Rooney (R-FL), Charlie Crist (D-FL), Brian Fitzpatrick (R-PA), and John Delaney (D-MD) introduced the Energy Innovation and Carbon Dividend Act (HR 763), which would implement a national carbon fee and dividend. It had also been introduced in the Senate in 2018 as S. 3791.

The 2018 midterm elections illustrated a growing partisan divide over climate, and one third of incumbent Republican members of the Caucus, including co-chair Curbelo, lost their seats. One study concluded that this showed limited value for GOP members in pursuing bipartisan climate action.

The House caucus went partially dormant after the 2018 elections, relaunching in 2023 with leaders Andrew Garbarino and Chrissy Houlahan.

== Mission ==
The House caucus web site describes the caucus as "working together to combat climate change while also protecting the economic prosperity of the United States. This is a group dedicated to building a constructive dialogue about climate change, economics, energy, and conservation among members of Congress, global leaders, environmental organizations, and business leaders."

== House members, 118th Congress ==
Congressional Climate Solutions Caucus in the 118th United States Congress

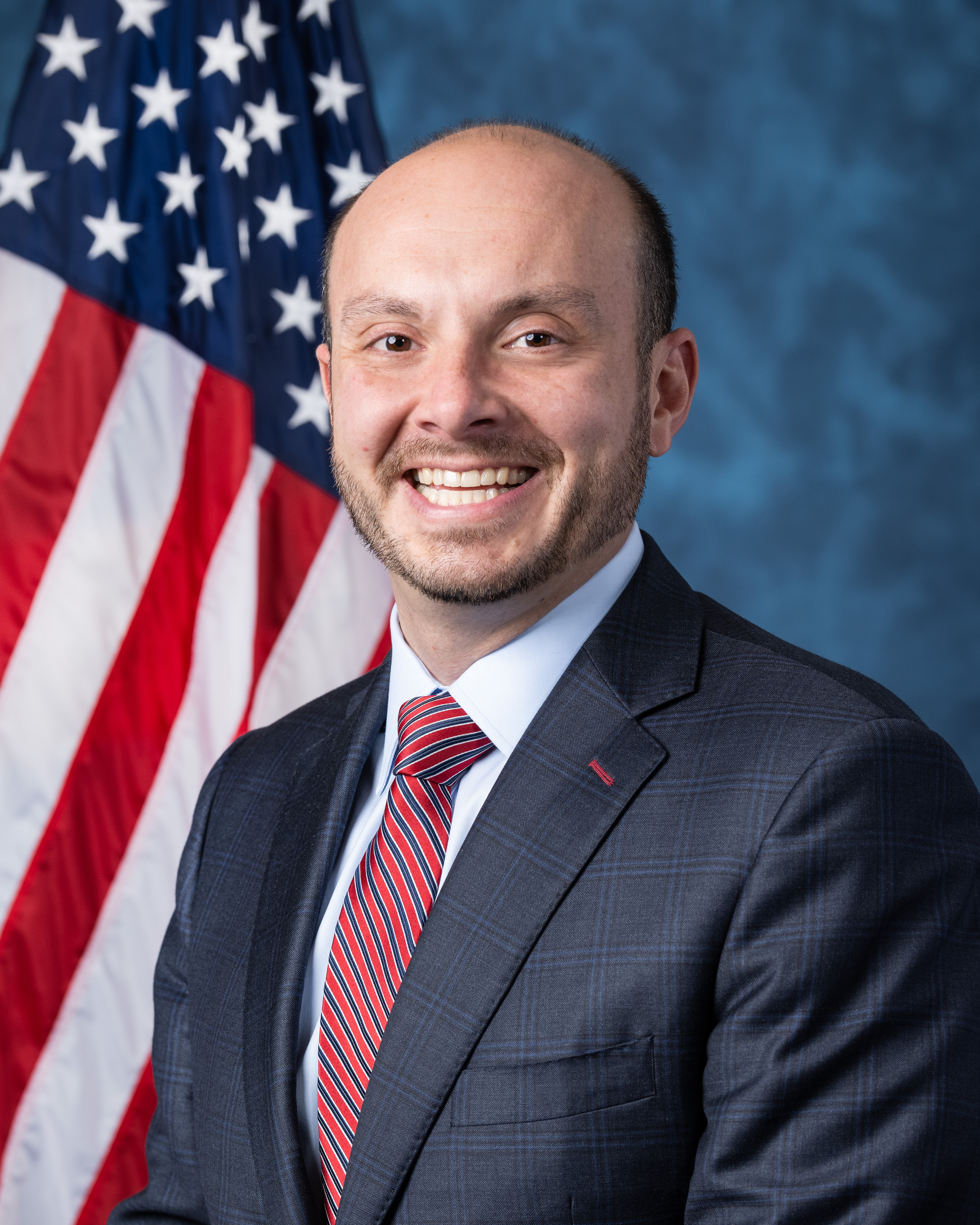
Co-chair Andrew Garbarino

Membership of the caucus is restricted to consist of equal representation of Republicans and Democrats. After the 2018 United States House of Representatives elections for the 116th Congress this rule was loosened, but strict balance was restored again in 2023 in the 118th Congress. In the 118th Congress, the 66 members were as follows (independent Kevin Kiley (CA-03) caucuses with the Republicans):

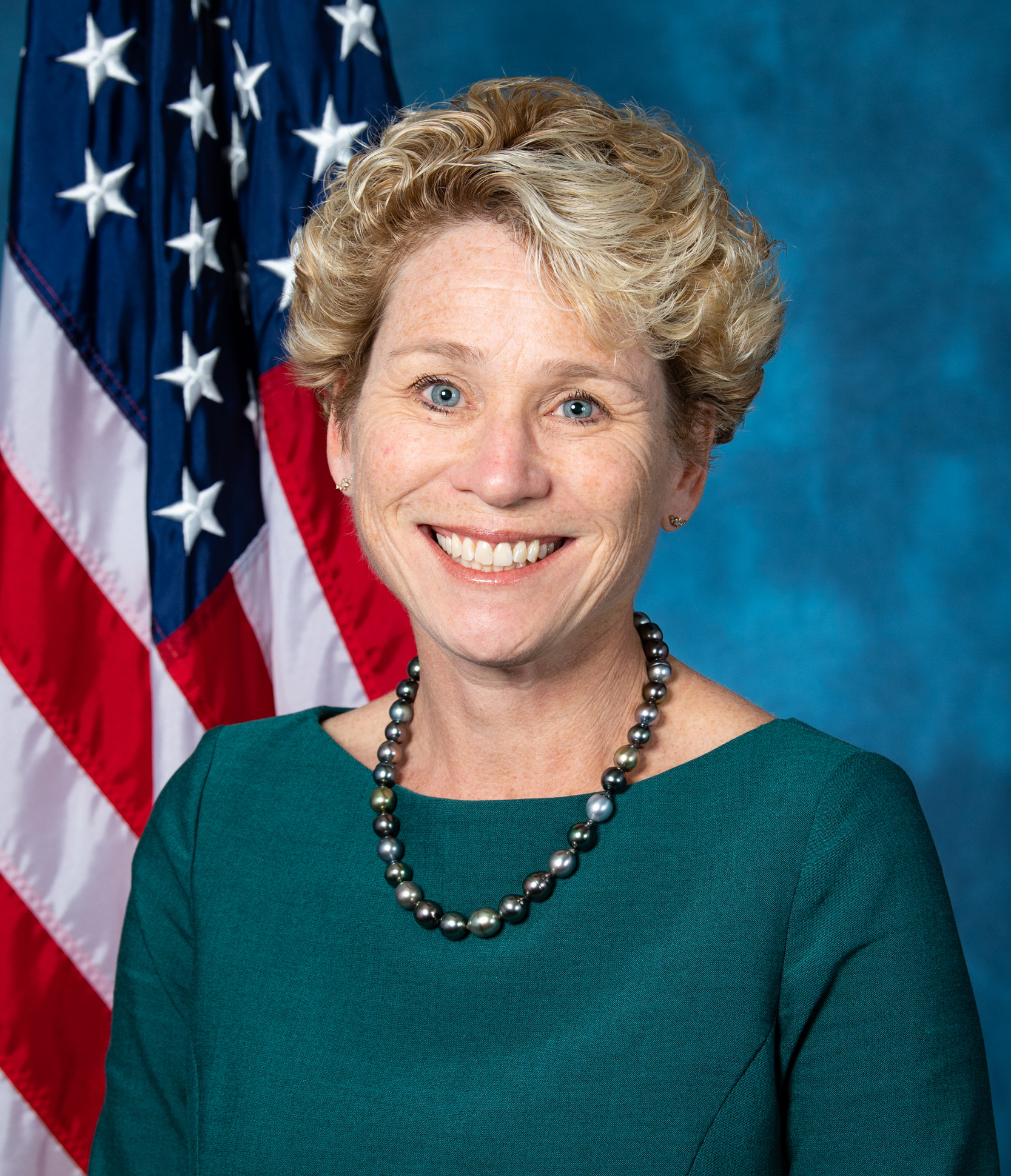
Co-chair Chrissy Houlahan

Name	Party	District
Andrew Garbarino (co-chair)	Republican	New York's 2nd congressional district
Chrissy Houlahan (co-chair)	Democratic	Pennsylvania's 6th congressional district
Amata Coleman Radewagen	Republican	American Samoa's at-large congressional district
Ami Bera	Democratic	California's 7th congressional district
Ann McLane Kuster	Democratic	New Hampshire's 2nd congressional district
Anna Eshoo	Democratic	California's 18th congressional district
Anthony D'Esposito	Republican	New York's 4th congressional district
Bill Posey	Republican	Florida's 8th congressional district
Bobby Scott	Democratic	Virginia's 3rd congressional district
Brad Schneider	Democratic	Illinois' 10th congressional district
Brendan Boyle	Democratic	Pennsylvania's 2nd congressional district
Brett Guthrie	Republican	Kentucky's 2nd congressional district
Brian Fitzpatrick	Republican	Pennsylvania's 1st congressional district
Brian Mast	Republican	Florida's 18th congressional district
Carlos A. Gimenez	Republican	Florida's 28th congressional district
David Joyce	Republican	Ohio's 14th congressional district
David Schweikert	Republican	Arizona's 6th congressional district
David Valadao	Republican	California's 22nd congressional district
Derek Kilmer	Democratic	Washington's 6th congressional district
Don Bacon	Republican	Nebraska's 2nd congressional district
Don Beyer	Democratic	Virginia's 8th congressional district
Dusty Johnson	Republican	South Dakota's at-large congressional district
Earl Blumenauer	Democratic	Oregon's 3rd congressional district
Eleanor Holmes Norton	Democratic	District of Columbia's at-large congressional district
Jack Bergman	Republican	Michigan's 1st congressional district
Jan Schakowsky	Democratic	Illinois's 9th congressional district
Jenniffer González-Colón	Republican	Puerto Rico's at-large congressional district
Jim Himes	Democratic	Connecticut's 4th congressional district
Jimmy Panetta	Democratic	California's 20th congressional district
John Curtis	Republican	Utah's 3rd congressional district
John B. Larson	Democratic	Connecticut's 1st congressional district
Josh Gottheimer	Democratic	New Jersey's 5th congressional district
Juan Ciscomani	Republican	Arizona's 6th congressional district
Juan Vargas	Democratic	California's 51st congressional district
Julia Letlow	Republican	Louisiana's 5th congressional district
Judy Chu	Democratic	California's 27th congressional district
Kevin Kiley	Independent	California's 3rd congressional district
Kevin Mullin	Democratic	California's 15th congressional district
Lori Chavez-DeRemer	Republican	Oregon's 5th congressional district
Marcus Molinaro	Republican	New York's 19th congressional district
Marcy Kaptur	Democratic	Ohio's 9th congressional district
Maria Elvira Salazar	Republican	Florida's 27th congressional district
Mariannette Miller-Meeks	Republican	Iowa's 1st congressional district
Mark Amodei	Republican	Nevada's 2nd congressional district
Matt Cartwright	Democratic	Pennsylvania's 8th congressional district
Matt Gaetz	Republican	Florida's 1st congressional district
Mike Gallagher	Republican	Wisconsin's 8th congressional district
Mike Lawler	Republican	New York's 17th congressional district
Mike Thompson	Democratic	California's 5th congressional district
Nancy Mace	Republican	South Carolina's 1st congressional district
Nydia Velázquez	Democratic	New York's 7th congressional district
Nick LaLota	Republican	New York's 1st congressional district
Nicole Malliotakis	Republican	New York's 11th congressional district
Pete Aguilar	Democratic	California's 31st congressional district
Salud Carbajal	Democratic	California's 24th congressional district
Scott Peters	Democratic	California's 52nd congressional district
Seth Moulton	Democratic	Massachusetts's 6th congressional district
Shri Thanedar	Democratic	Michigan's 13th congressional district
Stacey Plaskett	Democratic	United States Virgin Islands's at-large congressional district
Susan Wild	Democratic	Pennsylvania's 7th congressional district
Stephen F. Lynch	Democratic	Massachusetts's 8th congressional district
Suzanne Bonamici	Democratic	Oregon's 1st congressional district
Tom Kean, Jr.	Republican	New Jersey's 7th congressional district
Tony Gonzales	Republican	Texas' 23rd congressional district
Troy Carter	Democratic	Louisiana's 2nd congressional district
Young Kim	Republican	California's 40th congressional district

== Senate members, 116th Congress ==
The Senate Climate Solutions Caucus was announced by senators Mike Braun (R-IN) and Chris Coons (D-DE) on October 23, 2019. The two Senators wrote in an op-ed announcing the caucus:

Today, we are launching the Senate Climate Solutions Caucus, a bipartisan group of senators who, like the Americans we serve, believe Congress should play a central role in guiding America's 21st century energy economy and addressing the challenge of a changing climate. Our caucus seeks to take the politics out of this important issue. Instead, members will commit to an honest dialogue, through which we can develop solutions that solidify American environmental leadership, promote American workers, and make meaningful progress on protecting our environment.

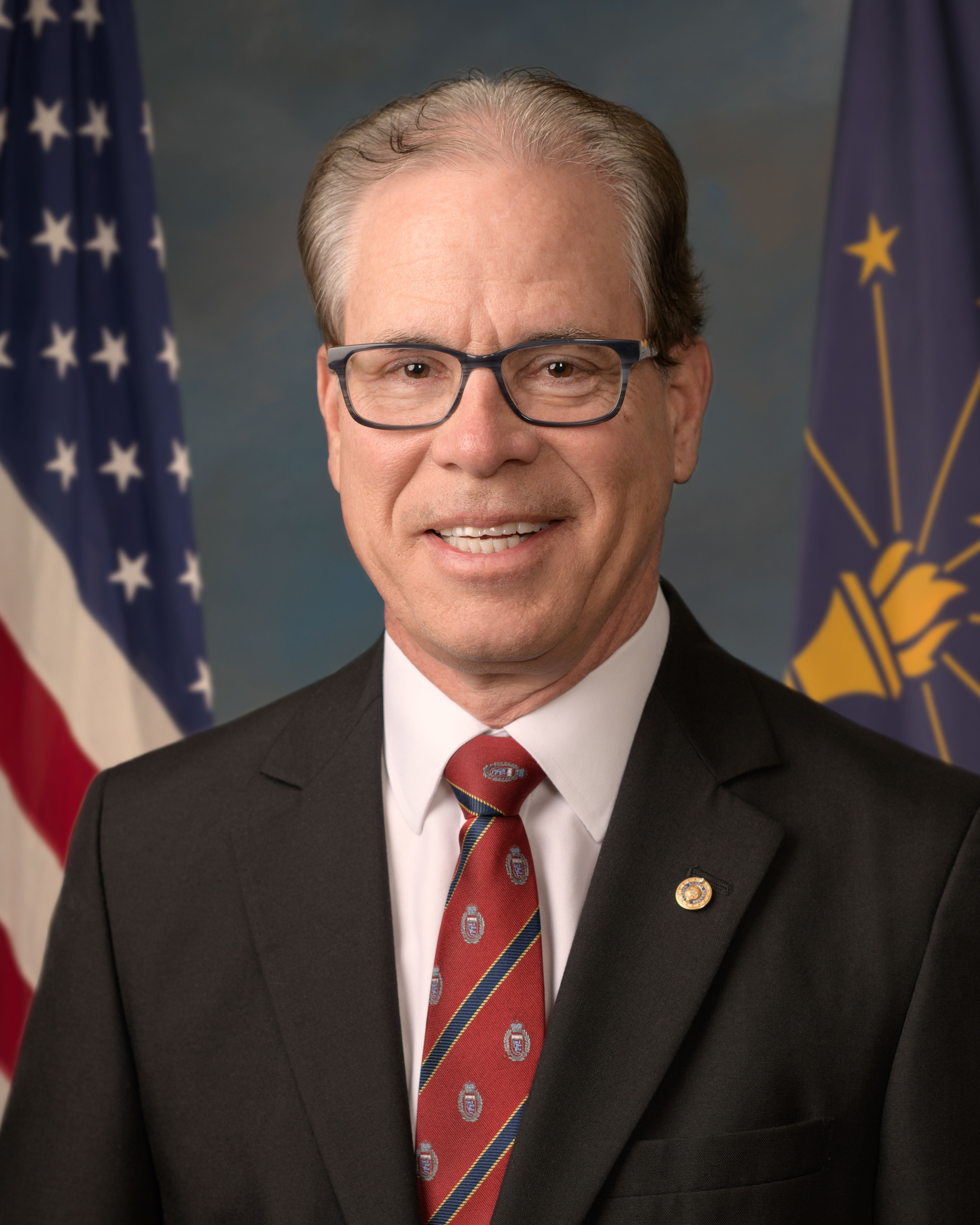
Co-chair Mike Braun (R-IN)

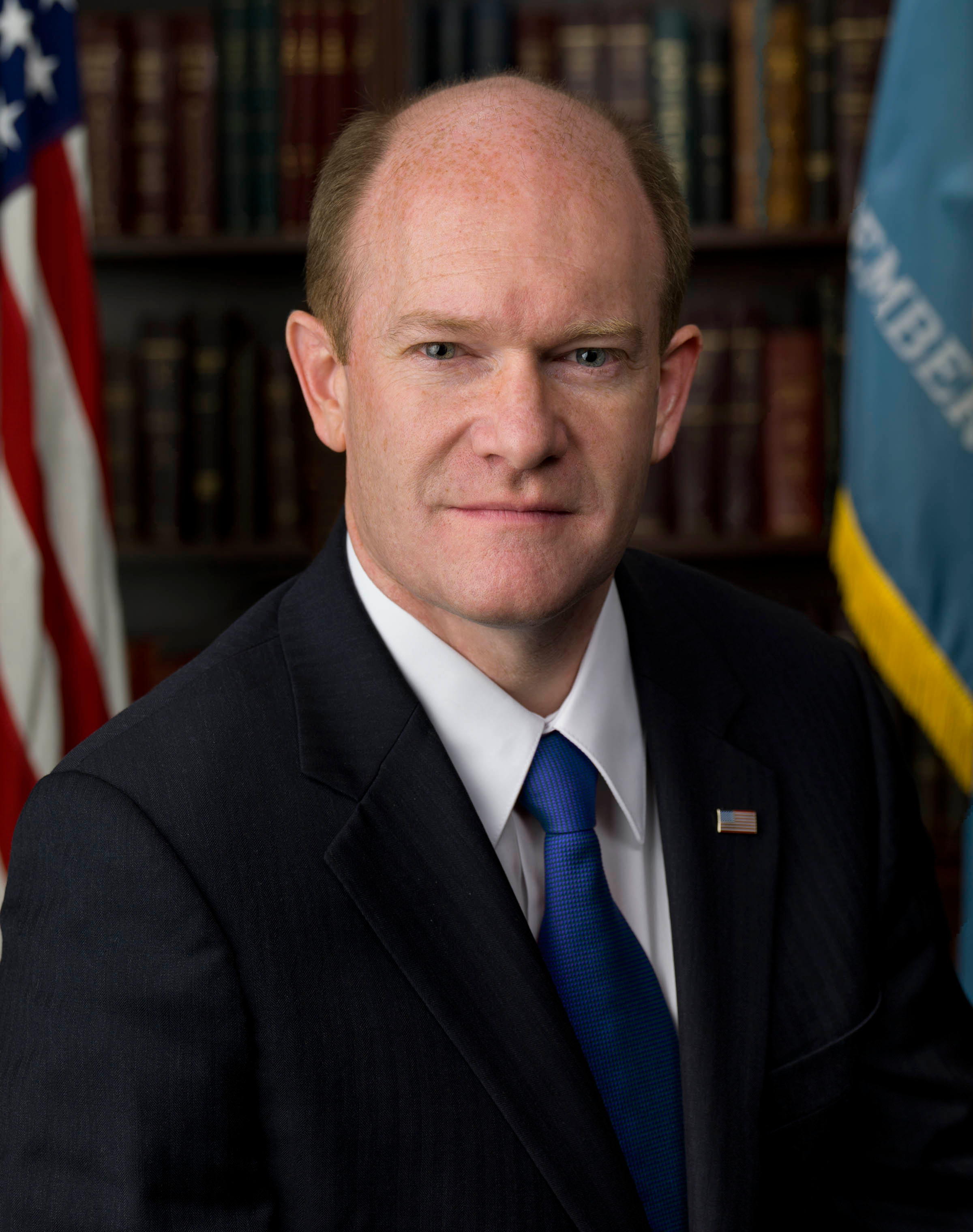
Co-chair Chris Coons (D-DE)

The Climate Solutions Caucus in the Senate is bi-partisan, the rules of the caucus require that new members may only join with a member of the opposite party to ensure that the number of Democrats and Republicans stays the same. All actions by the caucus require unanimous agreement among the members. The caucus membership for the 116th Congress is as follows (independent Angus King (I-ME) caucuses with the Democrats):

Name	Party	State
Mike Braun (co-chair)	Republican	Indiana
Chris Coons (co-chair)	Democratic	Delaware
Angus King	Independent	Maine
Debbie Stabenow	Democratic	Michigan
Jeanne Shaheen	Democratic	New Hampshire
Lindsey Graham	Republican	South Carolina
Lisa Murkowski	Republican	Alaska
Marco Rubio	Republican	Florida
Mitt Romney	Republican	Utah
Michael Bennet	Democratic	Colorado
Susan Collins	Republican	Maine
Tammy Baldwin	Democratic	Wisconsin
Jacky Rosen	Democratic	Nevada

== See also ==
- Citizens' Climate Lobby
- Friends Committee on National Legislation
- Problem Solvers Caucus
