= Microcredit Summit Campaign =

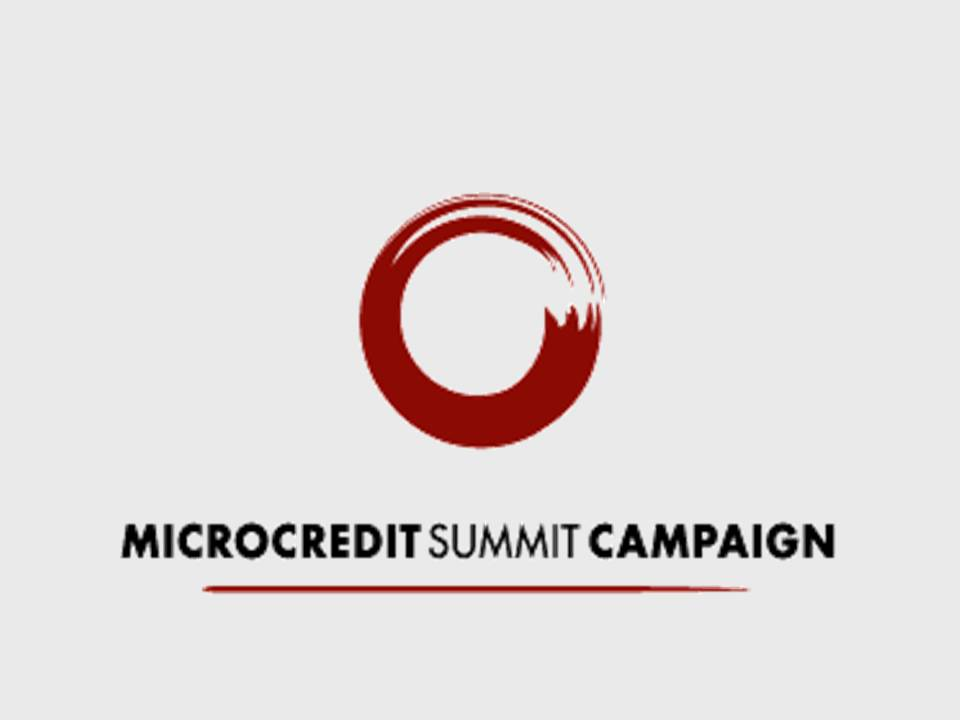
- Formation: 1997; 29 years ago -->
- Founded: 1997
- Type: Non-profit
- Tax ID no.: 95-3747267
- Purpose: Microfinance education Health education Poverty measurement
- Location: Washington, DC
- Region served: Asia, Africa, the Americas, Middle East
- Key people: Larry Reed, Director; co-Founders are Sam Daley-Harris (also former Director), Professor Muhammad Yunus (Grameen Bank), and John Hatch (FINCA)
- Parent organization: RESULTS Educational Fund

The Microcredit Summit Campaign, an American non-profit organization, started as an effort to bring together microcredit practitioners, advocates, educational institutions, donor agencies, international financial institutions, non-governmental organizations and others involved with microcredit around the goal of alleviating world poverty through microfinance.

== History ==
The first Microcredit Summit was held February 2–4, 1997 in Washington, DC. The first summit had approximately 3,000 in attendance from 137 countries. Hillary Clinton gave the keynote speech at the first Summit.

The outcome of the first Summit was the launch of a "campaign" to reach 100 million of the world's poorest families, especially the women of those families, with credit for self-employment and other financial and business services by the year 2005. In January 2009, to coincide with the release of the State of the Microcredit Summit Campaign Report 2009 (SOCR), the Microcredit Summit Campaign announced that over 100 million of the world's poorest families had received a microloan.

List of Microcredit Summit Campaign Conferences
1997, Microcredit Summit, Washington, DC, February 2–4.
1998, Global Microcredit Summit, New York City, June 24–27.
1999, Global Microcredit Summit, Abidjan, Côte d'Ivoire, June 24–27.
2000, Middle East/Africa Regional Microcredit Summit, Harare, Zimbabwe, October 8–13.
2001, Asia/Pacific Regional Microcredit Summit, New Delhi, India, February 2–5.
2001, 1st Latin America/Caribbean Regional Microcredit Summit, Puebla, Mexico, October 9–12.
2002, Global Microcredit Summit +5, New York City, November 12–13.
2004, Asia/Pacific Regional Microcredit Summit, Dhaka, Bangladesh, February 16–19.
2004, Middle East/Africa Regional Microcredit Summit, Amman, Jordan, October 10–13.
2005 Latin America/Caribbean Regional Microcredit Summit, Santiago, Chile, April 19–22.
2006, Global Microcredit Summit, Halifax, Canada, November 12–15.
2008, Asia/Pacific Regional Microcredit Summit, Bali, Indonesia, July 28–30.
2009, Latin America/Caribbean Regional Microcredit Summit, Cartagena, Colombia, June 8–10.
2010, Africa/Middle East Regional Microcredit Summit, Nairobi, Kenya, April 4–7.
2011, Global Microcredit Summit, Valladolid, Spain, November 14–17.
2013, Partnerships against Poverty Summit, Manila, Philippines, October 9–11.

== Approach ==
The Microcredit Summit Campaign was founded by Muhammad Yunus, Sam Daley-Harris, and John Hatch on a principle that emphasized a citizen-led approach of establishing and meeting a collective global goal. The Campaign represents more than a single organization and is a social movement that aims to advance the microfinance field and foster a productive learning community.

One of the best forums for fruitful conversations among many types of microcredit practitioners from around the world.

— Professor Muhammad Yunus, Nobel Peace Prize Winner

- Working to ensure that 175 million of the world's poorest families, especially the women of those families, are receiving credit for self-employment and other financial and business services by the end of 2015
- Working to ensure that 100 million families rise above the US$1.25 a day threshold adjusted for purchasing power parity (PPP), between 1990 and 2015.

== Microfinance access ==
By December 31, 2010, the Campaign counted more than 3,600 microfinance institutions that reported reaching more than 205 million clients with a current loan. Of these institutions in the developing world, 1,009 are in Sub-Saharan African, 1,746 are in Asia and the Pacific, 647 are in Latin America and the Caribbean with the remainder (250) in the Middle East and North Africa (MENA) and the industrialized regions of (1) North America and Western Europe and (2) Eastern Europe and Central Asia.

According to the State of the Microcredit Summit Campaign Report 2012, out of the total number of clients reached in 2010, 137.5 million were among the poorest and 82.3 percent (113.1 million) were women.

The growth in the number of very poor women reached has gone from 10.3 million at the end of 1999 to 113.1 million at the end of 2010. This is a 1,001 percent increase in the number of poorest women reached from December 31, 1999 to December 31, 2010. The increase represents an additional 109.9 million poorest women receiving microloans in the last 11 years.

Of the 137.5 million poorest clients, 122.5 million of them (89 percent) are being served by the 85 largest individual institutions and networks reporting to the Microcredit Summit Campaign, all with 100,000 or more poorest clients.

Size of Institution (in terms of poorest clients)	Number of Institutions	Number of Poorest Clients	Percentage of Total Poorest
1 million or more	13	40,267,670	29.28
100,000-999,999	64	17,095,196	12.43
10,000-99,999	361	10,877,810	7.91
2,500-9,999	558	2,731,044	1.99
Fewer than 2,500	2,648	1,470,448	1.07
Networks	8	65,105,273	47.33

=== Survey methodology ===
The Microcredit Summit Campaign has collected data for 14 years and began verifying that data in 2000.
The process of identifying access to microfinance consists of (1) the circulation of Institutional Action Plans (IAPs) to thousands of practitioners with a request for submission of their most recent data; (2) a phone campaign to hundreds of the largest MFIs in the world to encourage submission; (3) a verification process seeking third-party corroboration of the data submitted by the largest MFIs; (4) data compilation and analysis; and (5) the writing of the report.

Note: The data presented in the final report comes mainly from individual institutions and excludes network institutions to prevent double counting.

== See also ==
- BRAC (NGO)
- Freedom from Hunger
- Grameen Bank
