= Sam Daley-Harris =

American activist and author

- Occupations: Writer and activist
- Known for: Founding Results
- Notable work: Reclaiming Our Democracy: Healing the Break Between People and Government

Sam Daley-Harris is an American activist and author. He is the founder of Results, and has been a hunger eradication advocate and democracy activist since the mid-1970s. Daley-Harris is also the author of Reclaiming Our Democracy: Healing the Break Between People and Government.

== Early career ==
Early in his life, Sam Daley-Harris was a music teacher, and was a percussionist for the Miami Philharmonic.

== Activism ==
During the 1970s Daley-Harris became involved in the movement to eradicate global hunger. During this process he spoke with about seven thousand high-school students, at which time he discovered that only 3% of the youth knew the name of their congressperson. In response, he founded an organization called Results (stylized: RESULTS), which is an acronym for "Responsibility for Ending Starvation Using Legislation, Trimtabbing, and Support". After working with other anti-hunger organizations like Bread for the World, he founded the organization in 1980, which recruited and trained volunteers to lobby the government on food security and hunger issues. Tactics have included sit-down meetings with politicians, generating supportive media, and letter writing campaigns.

The organization has also helped advocate for global vaccination campaigns with UNICEF, and worked in promoting micro-lending. Muhammad Yunus said of Results' work in micro-lending that, “No other organization has been as critical a partner in seeing to it that micro-credit is used as a tool to eradicate poverty and empower women.” Daley-Harris has also served as the director of the Microcredit Summit Campaign, where he advocated for the role of microcredit in combating poverty. The Microcredit Summit Campaign tracked the “performance” of microfinance organizations.

He later founded the organization Center for Citizen Empowerment and Transformation, which provides consultations to organizations on the subject of “deep advocacy”, a method of working with politicians and the media to fuel advocacy efforts for social issues. The organization later changed its name to Civic Courage. He has also worked with Citizens' Climate Lobby.

== Writing ==
Sam Daley-Harris is the author of the book Reclaiming Our Democracy: Healing the Break Between People and Government, which at the end of the book outlines thirteen “principles of action”, and uses case-studies of successful advocacy to show evidence of their efficacy. Many of the case-studies come from Daley-Harris’ work as the head of Results. The original version was published in 1993, and a twentieth anniversary edition was published in 2013 with a foreword by Muhammad Yunus. He is also the co-editor of the book New Pathways Out of Poverty. Daley-Harris updated and revised the book and a 2024 edition was published with the title Reclaiming Our Democracy: Every Citizen's Guide to Transformational Advocacy The revised book added five principles and called them eighteen "commitments" that generate "transformational advocacy".
