= Kul Gautam =

Nepalese diplomat

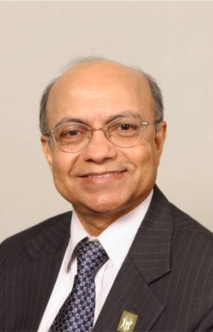
Kul Chandra Gautam

Kul Chandra Gautam is a diplomat, development professional, and a former senior official of the United Nations. Currently, he serves on the boards of several international and national organizations, charitable foundations and public-private partnerships. Previously, he served in senior managerial and leadership positions with the United Nations in several countries, in a career spanning over three decades. He is a former deputy executive director of UNICEF and Assistant Secretary-General of the United Nations.

He served as special advisor to the Prime Minister of Nepal on international affairs and the peace process from 2010 to 2011.

A citizen of Nepal, Gautam is active in Nepal's civil society in promoting human rights, socioeconomic development, democracy, and good governance. He writes on, speaks about, and informally advises Nepal's political and civil society leadership as well as the international community on Nepal's peace process, consolidation of democracy, human rights, and socioeconomic development.

Internationally, he continues to be active in advocacy of the UN Sustainable Development Goals, particularly in the areas of child rights, global health, basic education, and human development.

== Publications ==
Gautam writes and speaks extensively on international development, human rights, and human development; global health, education, child protection; the role of the United Nations; and on issues related to the peace process, democracy, and good governance in Nepal as well as globally.

Gautam's memoir, Global Citizen from Gulmi: My Journey from the Hills of Nepal to the Halls of the United Nations, was published by Nepalaya Publications in 2018. Another book, Lost in Transition: Rebuilding Nepal from the Maoist Mayhem and Mega Earthquake, was published in 2015.

== Awards ==
- The 2018 Harris Wofford Global Citizen Award, conferred by the US National Peace Corps Association.
- Martin Luther King, Jr. Social Justice Award for Lifetime Achievement, conferred by Dartmouth College, USA in 2009.
- The Audrey Hepburn Humanitarian Award, conferred by UNICEF USA in 2008
- The Bal-Kavi (Child Poet-Laureate) Award, conferred by District Commissioner of Palpa, Nepal in 1964

== Current positions and activities ==
- Chair, RESULTS Inc and RESULTS Education Fund (USA)
- Chair, Arigatou International Council of Prayer and Action for Children (Japan/USA)
- Chair, Programme Committee, OXFAM GB Council (UK)
- Co-Chair, Independent Accountability Panel for Every Woman, Child and Adolescent (UN/WHO)
- Vice-Chair, GoodWeave International (USA)
- Vice Chair, Aarogya (Health) Foundation (Nepal)
- International Trustee, Religions for Peace (USA)
- Member, Steering Committee of the Fund to End Violence against Children
- Champion, Global Partnership for Education
- Advisor, Non-Resident Nepalese Association
- Advisor, Nepal Public Health Foundation (Nepal)
- Advisor, Rato Bangla Educational Foundation (Nepal)
- Advisor, Retired UN Staff Association, Nepal
- Board Member, Madan Pustakalaya Foundation (Nepal)
- Patron, Hima Gautam Memorial Trust, Amarpur-Gulmi (Nepal)
- Past President, Rotary Club of Kathmandu Mid-town (Nepal)

== Previous positions and activities ==
- Chair, Programme Committee, OXFAM GB Council, (2014- 2018) (UK)
- Special Advisor to Prime Minister of Nepal on International Affairs and Peace Process (2010–11)
- Nepal's candidate for President of 66th session of UN General Assembly (2010–11)
- Chair, Gautam Buddha International Peace Award Committee, Nepal (2010–11)
- Chair of the Board, Citizens Bank International, Nepal (2010–11)
- Patron, Rollback Violence Campaign (Himsa Antya Abhiyan), Nepal (2009-2011)
- Champion, Global Partnership for Education (GPE)
- Chair/Member, Micronutrient Initiative, Canada (2001-2009)
- Chair, Audrey Hepburn Children's Fund (USA 2008-09)
- Chair, Partnership for Maternal, Newborn and Child Health Geneva, (2005-2007)
- Member, Global Alliance for Vaccines and Immunization (GAVI) Board (2004-2007)
- Member, Global Alliance for Improved Nutrition (GAIN) Board (2005–07)
- Member, Inter-faith Council for Ethics Education (2003–10)
- Member, Board of Governors of University of the World (USA), 2013–15
- Patron, Chance for Change: Inspiring Young Futures (Nepal/UK)
- Advisor, South Asia Food and Nutrition Security Initiative (World Bank)

== Positions held at UNICEF and the United Nations ==
- Assistant Secretary-General of the United Nations, Deputy Executive Director of UNICEF (2000–2007)
- Regional Director, UNICEF, for East Asia and the Pacific (1998–2000)
- Special Representative, UNICEF, India (1997)
- Director, UNICEF Programme Division, New York (1993–1996)
- Director, Planning and Coordination, UNICEF, New York (1989–1992)
- Chief, Latin America and the Caribbean, UNICEF, New York (1986–88)
- UNICEF Representative, Haiti (1983–86), and Laos (1979–82)
- UNICEF Programme Officer, Indonesia (1975–79), and Cambodia (1973–75)
