= Results (organization) =

US non-partisan citizens' advocacy organization

Results is a US non-partisan citizens' advocacy organization founded in 1980.

The organization aims to find long-term solutions to poverty by focusing on its root causes. It lobbies public officials, does research, and works with the media and the public to fight hunger and poverty. Results has 100 U.S. local chapters and has inspired the founding of Results organizations in four other countries, including Results Canada, Results UK, Results International Australia, and Results Japan.

== Founding ==
Founded in 1980 by Sam Daley-Harris, Results facilitates citizen advocacy by recruiting and educating volunteer citizens to become the voice of the poor and lobby on global and domestic poverty issues. In the late 1970s, Daley-Harris read the report from Jimmy Carter's 1978 Presidential Commission on Hunger and decided to help build political will to address hunger. Daley-Harris identified two obstacles; people did not believe they had any influence and they lacked the structure needed to be effective. Realizing that Americans were failing to take advantage of their access to democratic institutions, Daley-Harris developed the “deep advocacy” approach Results uses.

The name Results was originally an acronym for Responsibility for Ending Starvation Using Legislation, Trimtabbing, and Support, though the organization's name is no longer an acronym. "Trimtabbing" was a reference to trim tabs, the small surfaces that allow boat or aircraft pilots to control larger control surfaces like rudders or elevators and which were popularized as a metaphor for individual empowerment by Buckminster Fuller in a 1972 Playboy interview.

== Principles ==
Results works to build the political will to end poverty by transforming everyday Americans into skilled advocates. These volunteer advocates have helped shape federal government funding priorities to address the basic needs of poor people in the United States and around the world. Advocates are provided regular support by the Results organization. This includes guidance on working with the media, policy expert briefings, and building communications skill. Results volunteer efforts regularly lead to the publication of op-ed essays and letters to the editor. Advocates also receive coaching to create rapport with congressional staff. In 2017 during the first 100 days of the Trump administration, Results volunteers had 300 meetings with members of Congress or their aides.

== Child survival ==
In the 1980s Results worked with UNICEF director Jim Grant on child survival. Reaching out to elected officials and generating newspaper editorials, child survival support tripled. According to Kul Chandra Gautam formerly UNICEF's deputy executive director, this encouraged other countries to join in. UNICEF estimated this campaign saved the lives of 25 million children. In 1990 Results took the lead in creating the candlelight vigils that helped ensure the establishment of the World Summit for Children. To do this Results mobilized $40,000 of seed money from Japan and the celebrity support from Carol Kane, Valerie Harper, and many others.

== Microcredit ==
Results helped introduce microcredit to America. In 1987 Muhammad Yunus, who was later awarded the Nobel Peace Prize for pioneering the concepts of microcredit and microfinance, was visiting the United States and speaking to a congressional committee. After the hearing Results connected Yunus on conference calls with twenty-eight editorial writers resulting in editorials that helped ensure the passage of legislation that allocated $50 million for microcredit programs for the poor.

== AIDS, TB, and malaria ==
One strategy Results has pursued is to advocate for resources to address infectious diseases. On the tenth anniversary of the Global Fund to Fight AIDS, Tuberculosis and Malaria, the executive director of Results/Results Educational Fund (REF), Joanne Carter, called for a renewal of U.S. commitment to the Global Fund.
