= Nassir Abdulaziz Al-Nasser =

President of the 66th UN General Assembly

- ناصر عبد العزيز الناصر
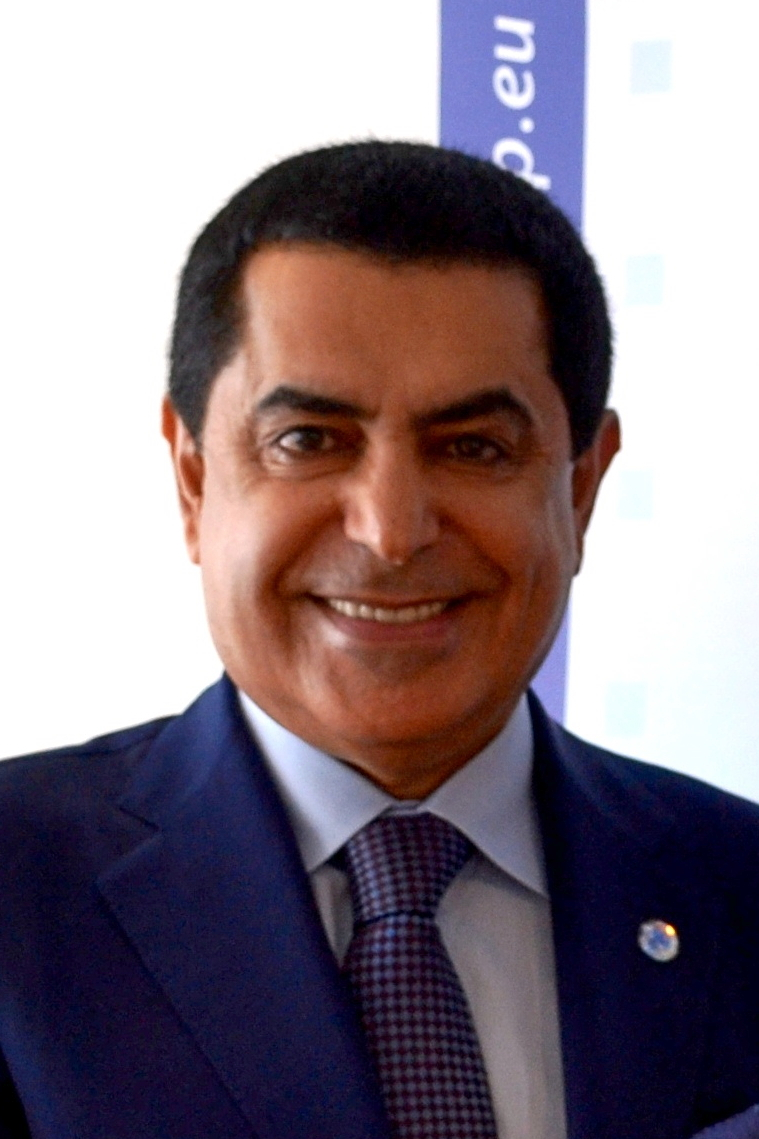
- Al-Nasser in 2012

High Representative for the Alliance of Civilisations
- In office 1 March 2013 – 7 March 2019
- Secretary-General: Ban Ki-moon; António Guterres
- Preceded by: Jorge Sampaio
- Succeeded by: Miguel Ángel Moratinos

President of the United Nations General Assembly
- In office 14 September 2011 – 18 September 2012
- Vice President: Mohammad Khazaee
- Preceded by: Joseph Deiss
- Succeeded by: Vuk Jeremić

Ambassador of Qatar to the United Nations
- In office 11 September 1998 – 2 August 2011
- Monarch: Hamad Al Thani
- Prime Minister: Abdullah bin Khalifa; Hamad bin Jassim
- Preceded by: Ali Hamad
- Succeeded by: Meshal Hamad Al-Thani

Personal details
- Born: 15 September 1952 (age 73) Doha, British Qatar
- Party: Independent
- Spouse: Muna Ruhani
- Profession: Politician; Diplomat

Nassir Abdulaziz Al-Nasser (Arabic: ناصر عبد العزيز الناصر; born 15 September 1952) is a Qatari diplomat and the former permanent representative of Qatar to the United Nations, appointed on 11 September 1998. Prior to this office at the United Nations, Al-Nasser had served as the ambassador to Jordan from 1993. He worked for his country's foreign affairs department beginning in November 1972. He was the President of the Sixty-sixth session of the United Nations General Assembly from 14 September 2011 to 18 September 2012.

== Early life ==
Al-Nasser was born on 15 September 1952 in Doha, Qatar. He was educated in Lebanon and Qatar, and he graduated with degrees in political science and diplomacy in 1979. He is married to Muna Rihani, with whom he had a son, Abdulaziz.

== Diplomatic career ==
He entered the Ministry of Foreign Affairs in 1971 and became Attaché at the embassy of Qatar in Beirut, Lebanon and was in office until 1974, when he became a member of Qatar's delegation to the Organisation of the Islamic Conference. He resigned in 1975 to become attaché at the Qatari embassy in Islamabad, Pakistan for a short time. Then, he was conseiller général at Qatar's embassy in Dubai, United Arab Emirates from 1975 to August 1981.

He returned to Doha and was a senior employee of the Ministry of Foreign Affairs from 1981 to 1985 as well as Deputy Foreign Minister from 1984 to 1985. He served as ambassador of Qatar to Jordan from 1993 to 1998.

=== United Nations career ===
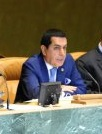
President Nassir Abdulaziz Al-Nasser presiding over the United Nations General Assembly at the General Assembly Hall.

In 1986 he was appointed minister to Qatar's permanent mission to the United Nations. He left office in 1993 to become ambassador to Jordan. On 11 September 1998, he was appointed as ambassador and permanent representative to the United Nations by Hamad bin Jassim bin Jaber Al Thani, then foreign minister. During his office at the United Nations, Al-Nasser has served as chairman of the delegation of Group of 77 and China, Vice-President of the General Assembly in 2002, and President of the Security Council in December 2006.

He was appointed as High Representative for the Alliance of Civilizations of the United Nations by the UN Secretary-General Ban Ki-moon on 28 September 2012.

==== President of the General Assembly ====
In June 2011 he was elected to serve as President of the General Assembly for its 66th session, beginning 13 September 2011. He took office on 13 September, saying in his opening speech that the international community had an opportunity to "define our place in this decisive moment in history" and to "prove that we have the courage, wisdom and tenacity to seek creative and visionary solutions." He also added that he was committed to working with every member state to "build bridges for a united global partnership" citing "strong collaboration and consensus-building [as...] essential for successfully moving forward the Assembly's agenda [in] this session."

Al-Nasser suggested the theme "The role of mediation in the settlement of disputes" for the General Debate during the opening session of the General Assembly. He said that "this theme has a broad and multi-faceted nature. I expect member states to touch upon different aspects of this matter through their own experience and perspective. [The UN is currently at a] critical juncture in the history of nations."

=== Post-presidency ===
In December 2013, Al-Nasser received the Global Thinkers Forum 2013 Award for 'Excellence in Leadership'.

Positions in intergovernmental organisations
Preceded by Joseph Deiss	President of the United Nations General Assembly; 2011–2012	Succeeded by Vuk Jeremić
Diplomatic posts
Preceded by Ali Hamad	Ambassador of Qatar to the United Nations; 1998–2011	Succeeded by Meshal Hamad Al-Thani
