= Exclusive economic zone =

Adjacent sea zone in which a state has special rights

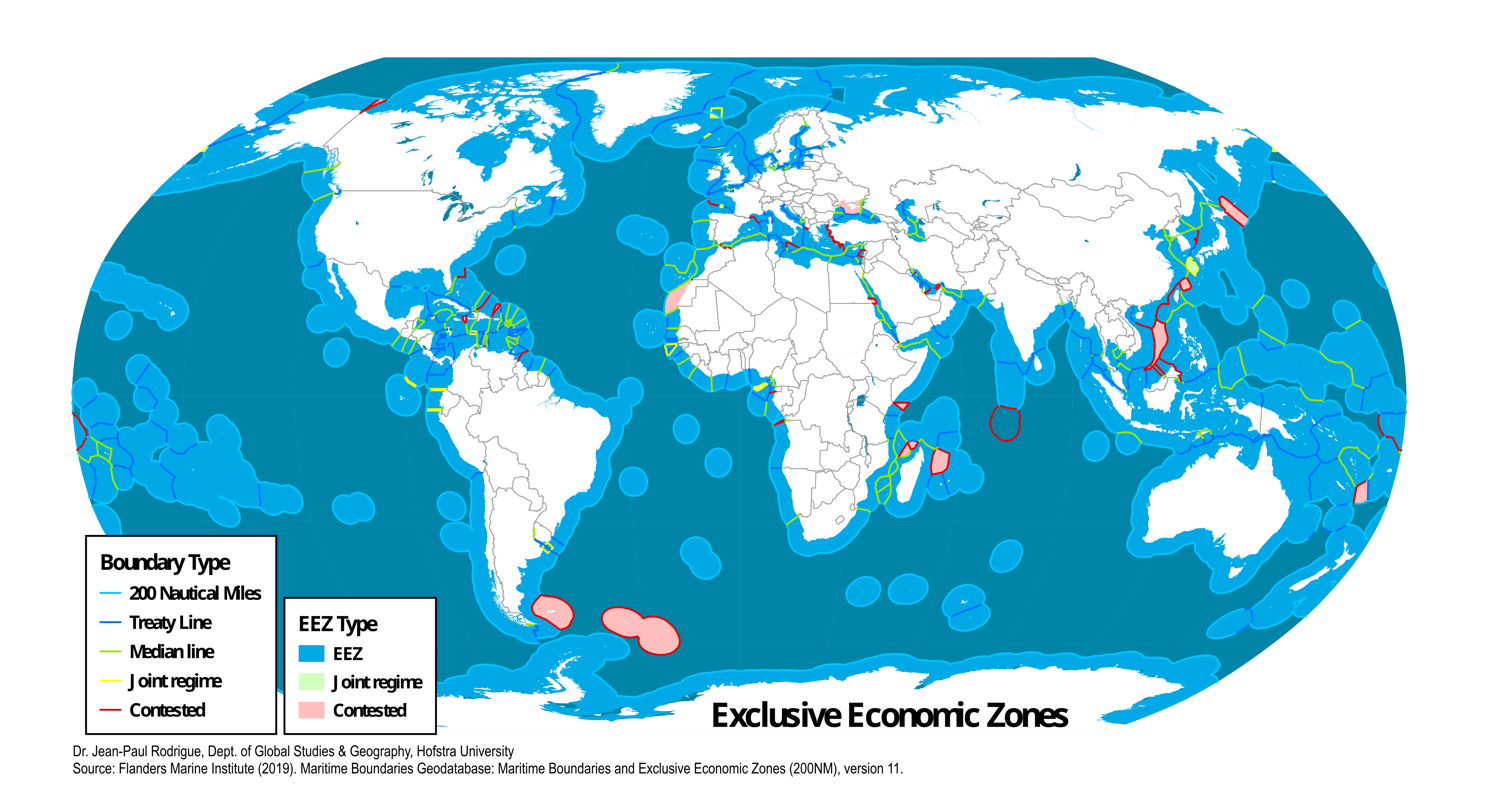
The world's exclusive economic zones by boundary types and EEZ types

An exclusive economic zone (EEZ), as prescribed by the 1982 United Nations Convention on the Law of the Sea, is an area of the sea in which a sovereign state has exclusive rights regarding the exploration and use of marine resources, including energy production from water and wind.

It stretches from the outer limit of the territorial sea at 12 nautical miles (22 km; 14 mi) from the coast to 200 nautical miles (370 km; 230 mi) from the coast of the state in question. It is also referred to as a maritime continental margin and, in colloquial usage, may include the continental shelf. The term does not include either the territorial sea or the continental shelf beyond the 200 nautical mile limit. The difference between the territorial sea and the exclusive economic zone is that the first confers full sovereignty over the waters, whereas the second is merely a "sovereign right" which refers to the coastal state's rights below the surface of the sea. The surface waters are international waters.

== Definition ==
Maritime zones under international law

Generally, a state's exclusive economic zone is an area beyond and adjacent to the territorial sea, extending seaward to a distance of no more than 200 nmi (370 km) out from its coastal baseline. The exception to this rule occurs when exclusive economic zones would overlap; that is, state coastal baselines are less than 400 nmi (741 km) apart. When an overlap occurs, it is up to the states to delineate the actual maritime boundary. Generally, any point within an overlapping area defaults to the nearest state.

The exclusive economic zone stretches much further into sea than the territorial waters, which end at 12 nmi (22 km) from the coastal baseline (if following the rules set out in the United Nations Convention on the Law of the Sea). Thus, the exclusive economic zones includes the contiguous zone.

States also have rights to the seabed of what is called the extended continental shelf up to 350 nmi (648 km) from the coastal baseline, beyond the exclusive economic zones, but such areas are not part of their exclusive economic zones.

The legal definition of the continental shelf does not correspond exactly to the geological meaning of the term, as it also includes the continental rise and slope, and the entire seabed within the exclusive economic zone.

== Origin and history ==
The idea of allotting nations' EEZs to give them more control of maritime affairs outside territorial limits gained acceptance in the late 20th century.

Initially, a country's sovereign territorial waters extended 3 nmi (6 km) (range of cannon shot) beyond the shore. In modern times, a country's sovereign territorial waters extend to 12 nmi (22 km) beyond the shore. One of the first assertions of exclusive jurisdiction beyond the traditional territorial seas was made by the United States in the Truman Proclamation of 28 September 1945. However, it was Chile and Peru respectively that first claimed maritime zones of 200 nautical miles with the Presidential Declaration Concerning Continental Shelf signed by Chilean President Gabriel Gonzalez Videla on 23 June 1947 and by Peruvian President Jose Luis Bustamante y Rivero through Presidential Decree No. 781 of 1 August 1947

It was not until 1982 with the UN Convention on the Law of the Sea that the 200 nautical mile exclusive economic zone was formally adopted.

== Disputes ==
The exact extent of exclusive economic zones is a common source of conflicts between states over marine waters.

=== Unresolved ===
==== Arctic Ocean ====
- A wedge-shaped section of the Beaufort Sea, an area that reportedly contains substantial oil reserves, is disputed between Canada and the United States.

==== Atlantic Ocean ====
- Several countries (Denmark, Iceland, Ireland, and the United Kingdom) have competing claims to the continental shelf near Rockall, an uninhabitable rock located in the EEZ of the United Kingdom. In addition, since Brexit the United Kingdom has claimed a 12 nautical miles (22 km) exclusion zone around Rockall, which Ireland does not recognise.

==== Caribbean Sea ====
- In 1996, the Dominican Republic and United Kingdom signed an agreement establishing a simplified equidistance boundary between the British Overseas Territory of Turks and Caicos and the Dominican Republic. Mouchoir Bank fell on the Turks and Caicos side of the boundary, and Silver and Navidad Banks on the Dominican Republic side. However, the agreement was not subsequently ratified by either party. Instead, the Dominican Republic declared itself an archipelagic state in 2007, claiming sovereignty over Mouchoir Bank and extending its EEZ beyond the boundary agreement with the United Kingdom. The United Kingdom does not accept the archipelagic status and maritime boundaries claimed by the Dominican Republic.
- Since 2007, the Dominican Republic in Hispaniola considers itself an archipelagic state, encroaching the long-established median or equidistance line dividing the EEZ of the Dominican Republic and Puerto Rico, and claiming portion of the EEZ claimed by the United States in relation to the archipelago of Puerto Rico, itself an unincorporated U.S. territory. The United States does not accept the archipelagic status and maritime boundaries claimed by the Dominican Republic. Victor Prescott, an authority in the field of maritime boundaries, argued that, as the coasts of both states are short coastlines with few offshore islands, an equidistance line is appropriate.

==== Indian Ocean ====
- Mauritius claims an EEZ for Tromelin Island from France and an EEZ in respect of the British Indian Ocean Territory from the UK. An Exclusive Economic Zone covering 2.3 million square kilometres is claimed by Mauritius.

==== Mediterranean Sea ====
- Croatia's ZERP (Ecological and Fisheries Protection Zone) in the Adriatic Sea caused friction with Italy and Slovenia, and caused problems during the accession of Croatia to the European Union.
- Turkey claims a portion of Cyprus's claimed EEZ based on Turkey's definition that no islands, including Cyprus, can have a full EEZ and should only be entitled to 12 nautical miles. Furthermore, the Turkish Republic of Northern Cyprus (TRNC), only recognized by Turkey, also claims portions of Cyprus's claimed EEZ. Turkey also disputes Greece's EEZ for the same reason in regards to its islands in the Aegean Sea. Turkey is one of few countries to not have signed UNCLOS.
- Greece claims that the maritime deal between the internationally recognized GNA government of Libya and Turkey is "illegal" according to the European Union and it signed a counter agreement with Egypt.
- Lebanon claims that the agreement between Cyprus and Israel overlapped its own EEZ.

==== Pacific Ocean ====
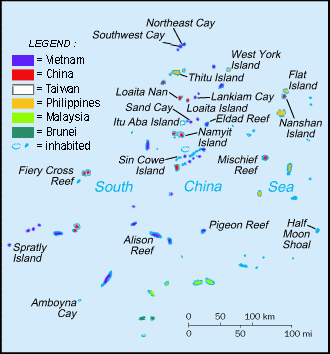
De facto territories in the Spratly Islands in the South China Sea

- The South China Sea is the setting for several ongoing disputes between regional powers including China, Taiwan, Vietnam, the Philippines, Indonesia, Malaysia and Brunei.
- Japan claims an EEZ around Okinotorishima, but this is disputed by China, Taiwan, and South Korea, who claim it is an islet which is incapable of generating an EEZ.
- China and South Korea debates over the boundaries of EEZs in the East China Sea and Yellow Sea, including Socotra Rock, a source for territorial dispute.

=== Potential ===
Regions where a permanent ice shelf extends beyond the coastline are also a source of potential dispute.

=== Resolved ===
- The Cod Wars between the United Kingdom and Iceland occurred periodically over many decades until they were resolved with a final agreement in 1976.
- In 1992, the Canada–France Maritime Boundary Case, which centred on the EEZ around the French islands of Saint Pierre and Miquelon, was decided by an arbitral tribunal that concurred on the whole with the arguments put forth by Canada. France was awarded 18% of the area it had originally claimed.
- In 1999, following the Hanish Islands conflict, the Permanent Court of Arbitration ruled that the EEZs of Yemen and Eritrea should be demarcated equidistantly between the mainlands of the two nations, without taking account of sovereignty over the islands.
- In 2009, in a dispute between Romania and Ukraine over Snake Island, the UN International Court of Justice decided that Snake Island has no EEZ beyond 12 nautical miles of its own land.
- In 2010, a dispute between Norway and Russia about both territorial waters and EEZ with regard to the Svalbard archipelago as it affects Russia's EEZ due to its unique treaty status was resolved. A treaty was agreed in principle in April 2010 between the two states and subsequently officially ratified, resolving this demarcation dispute. The agreement was signed in Murmansk on 15 September 2010.
- In 2014, the Netherlands and Germany resolved an old border dispute regarding the exact location of the border in the Dollart Bay.

== Transboundary stocks ==
Fisheries management, usually adhering to guidelines set by the Food and Agriculture Organization (FAO), provides significant practical mechanisms for the control of EEZs. Transboundary fish stocks are an important concept in this control. Transboundary stocks are fish stocks that range in the EEZs of at least two countries. Straddling stocks, on the other hand, range both within an EEZ as well as in the high seas, outside any EEZ. A stock can be both transboundary and straddling.

== By region or country ==
=== Region ===
==== Caribbean Sea ====
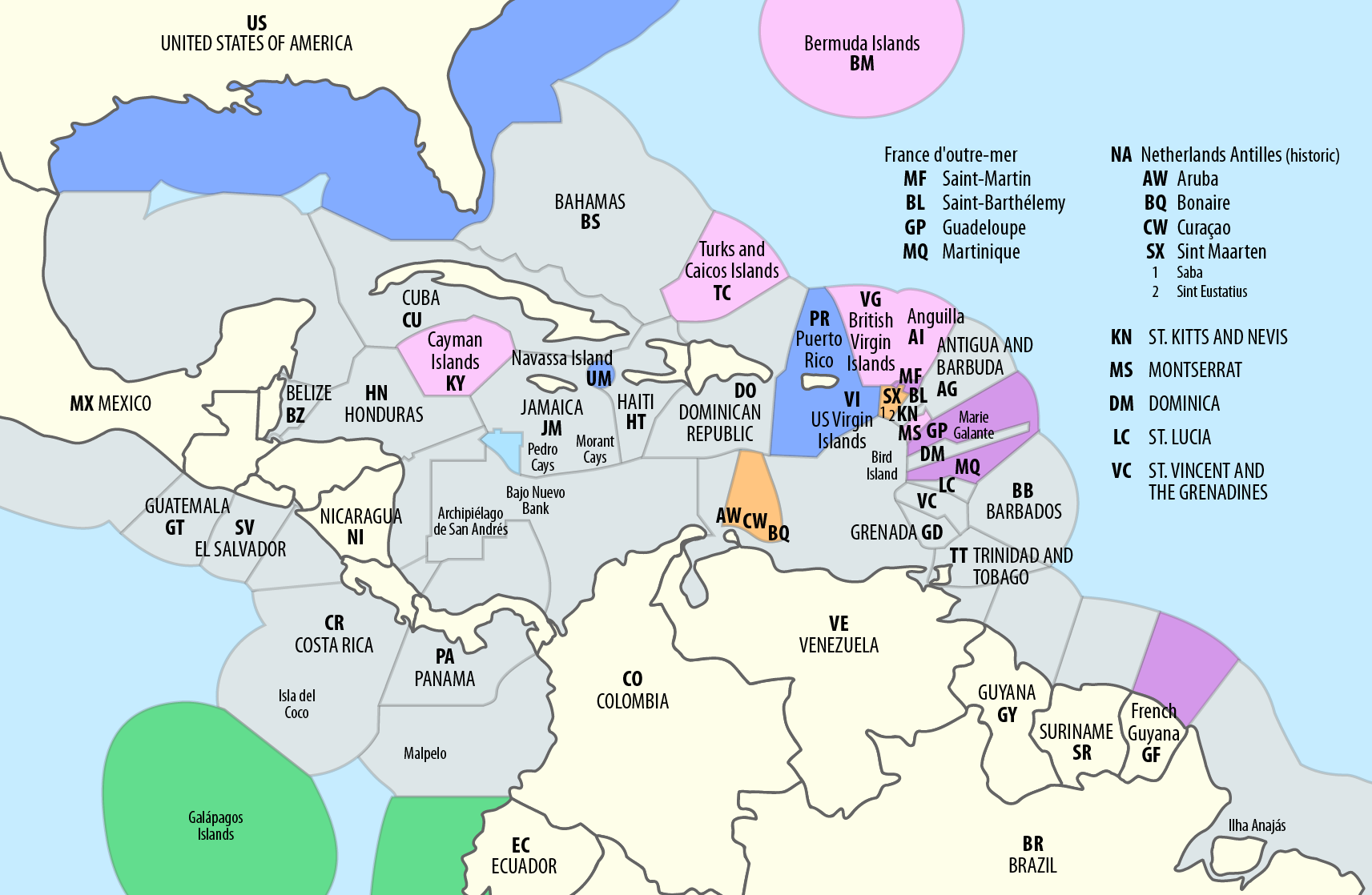
EEZs in the Caribbean Sea

==== Atlantic and Indian Oceans ====
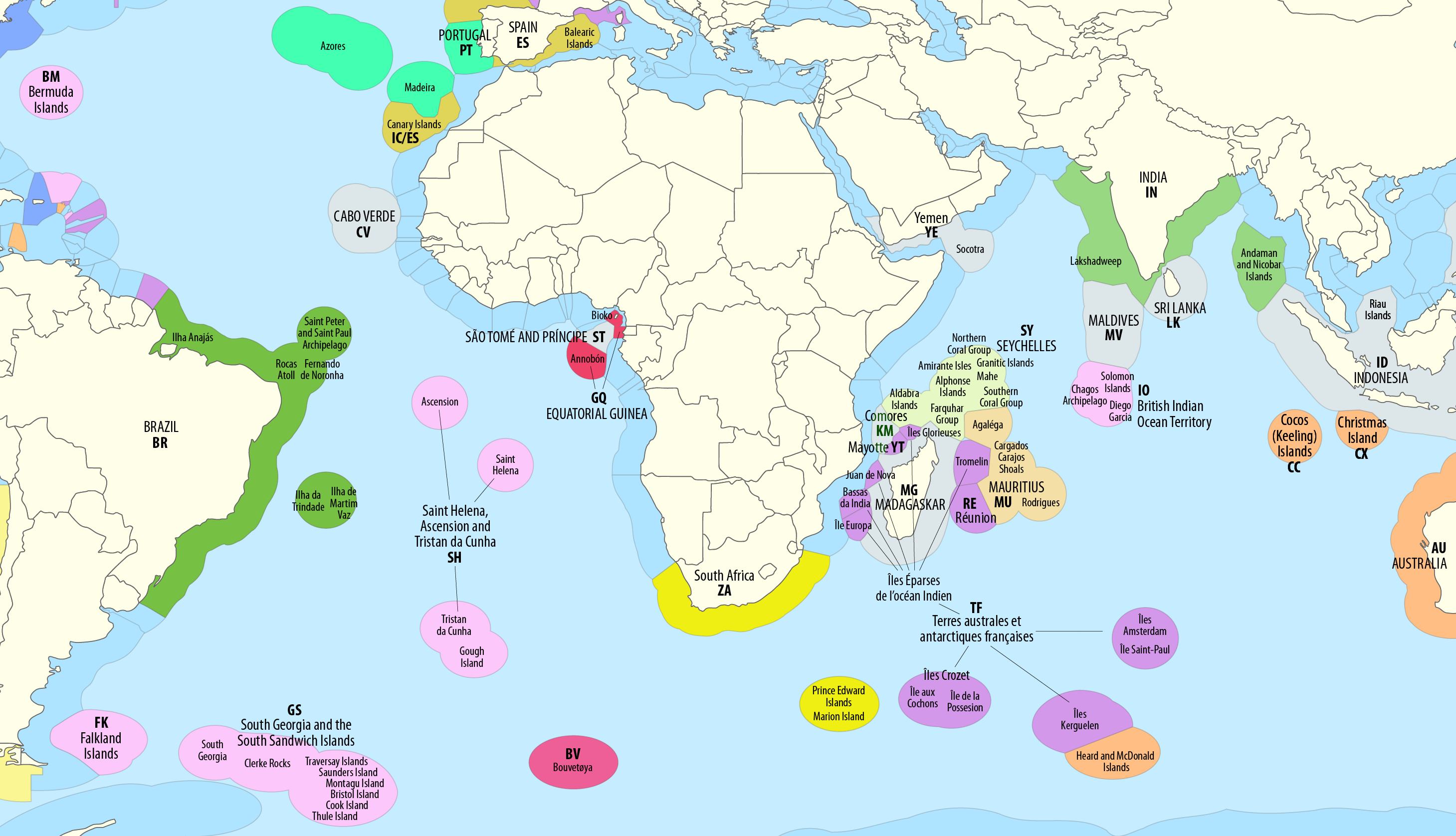
EEZs in the Atlantic and Indian Oceans

==== Pacific Ocean ====
EEZs in the Pacific Ocean

=== Country ===
==== Algeria ====
Algeria on 17 April 2018 established an exclusive economic zone (EEZ) off its coasts by Presidential Decree No. 18-96 of 2 Rajab 1439 corresponding to 20 March 2018. The permanent mission of Spain to the United Nations on 27 July 2018 declared its disagreement with the EEZ announced by Algeria and that the government of Spain indicated its willingness to enter into negotiations with the government of Algeria with a view to reaching a mutually acceptable agreement on the outer limits of their respective exclusive economic zones, The same was done by the Italian mission on 28 November 2018. The two countries indicated that the Algerian measure had been taken unilaterally and without consulting them.

On 25 November 2018, the Algerian Ministry of Foreign Affairs sent an oral note in response to the Spanish protest, explaining that the Algerian government does not recognize the largely exorbitant coordinates contained in Royal Decree 236/2013, which overlap with the coordinates of Presidential Decree n° 18–96 establishing an exclusive economic zone off the coast of Algeria. The Algerian government wished to emphasize that the unilateral delimitation carried out by Spain is not in conformity with the letter of the United Nations Convention on the Law of the Sea and has not taken into consideration the configuration, the specific characteristics, and the special circumstances of the Mediterranean Sea, in particular for the case of the two countries whose coasts are located face to face, as well as the objective rules and relevant principles of international law to govern the equitable delimitation of the maritime areas between Algeria and Spain, in accordance with article 74 of the United Nations Convention on the Law of the Sea. Algeria expressed its willingness to negotiate for a just solution.

On 20 June 2019, a communication from Algeria was sent. It was addressed to the Italian embassy and the Spanish embassy in Algiers to show their eligibility in Algeria's exclusive economic zone.

==== Argentina ====
Argentina's exclusive economic zones, including its territorial claims (the Falklands and South Georgia, etc. plus its Antarctic claim)

Considering the maritime areas claimed, the total area of Argentina reaches 3,849,756 km^{2}. The recognized Argentine EEZ area is 1,159,063 km^{2}.

==== Australia ====
Australia's exclusive economic zones, including its Antarctic claim

Australia's exclusive economic zone was declared on 1 August 1994, and extends from 12 to 200 nautical miles from the coastline of Australia and its external territories, except where a maritime delimitation agreement exists with another state. To the 12 nautical miles boundary is Australia's territorial waters. Australia has the third largest exclusive economic zone, behind France and the United States, but ahead of Russia, with a total area of 8,148,250 square kilometres, which actually exceeds its land territory.

The United Nations Commission on the Limits of the Continental Shelf (CLCS) confirmed, in April 2008, Australia's rights over an additional 2.5 million square kilometres of seabed beyond the limits of Australia's EEZ. Australia also claimed, in its submission to the UN Commission on the Limits of the Continental Shelf, additional Continental Shelf past its EEZ from the Australian Antarctic Territory, but these claims were deferred on Australia's request. However, Australia's EEZ from its Antarctic Territory is approximately 2 million square kilometres.

Region	EEZ Area (km^{2})
Mainland Australia (5 States and 3 Territories of the Australian Federation), Tasmania, and other minor islands	6,048,681
Macquarie Island	471,837
Christmas Island	463,371
Norfolk Island	428,618
Heard Island and McDonald Islands	410,722
Cocos Islands	325,021
Australian Antarctic Territory	2,000,000 (Note: The reference gives an approximate figure of 2 million square kilometres for the EEZ claimed by Australia as part of its Antarctic Territory. This is in addition to the 8 million square kilometres total given in the reference. This EEZ is also distinct from the 2.56 million square kilometres of additional continental shelf mentioned in the reference.)
Total	8,148,250

==== Brazil ====
Brazil's exclusive economic zones

Brazil's EEZ includes areas around the Fernando de Noronha Islands, Saint Peter and Saint Paul Archipelago, and the Trindade and Martim Vaz Islands.

Region	EEZ Area (km^{2})
Mainland Brazil (9 States of the Brazilian Federation)	2,570,917
Trindade and Martim Vaz Islands	468,599
Saint Peter and Saint Paul Archipelago	413,636
Fernando de Noronha Islands	363,362
Total	3,830,955

==== Canada ====
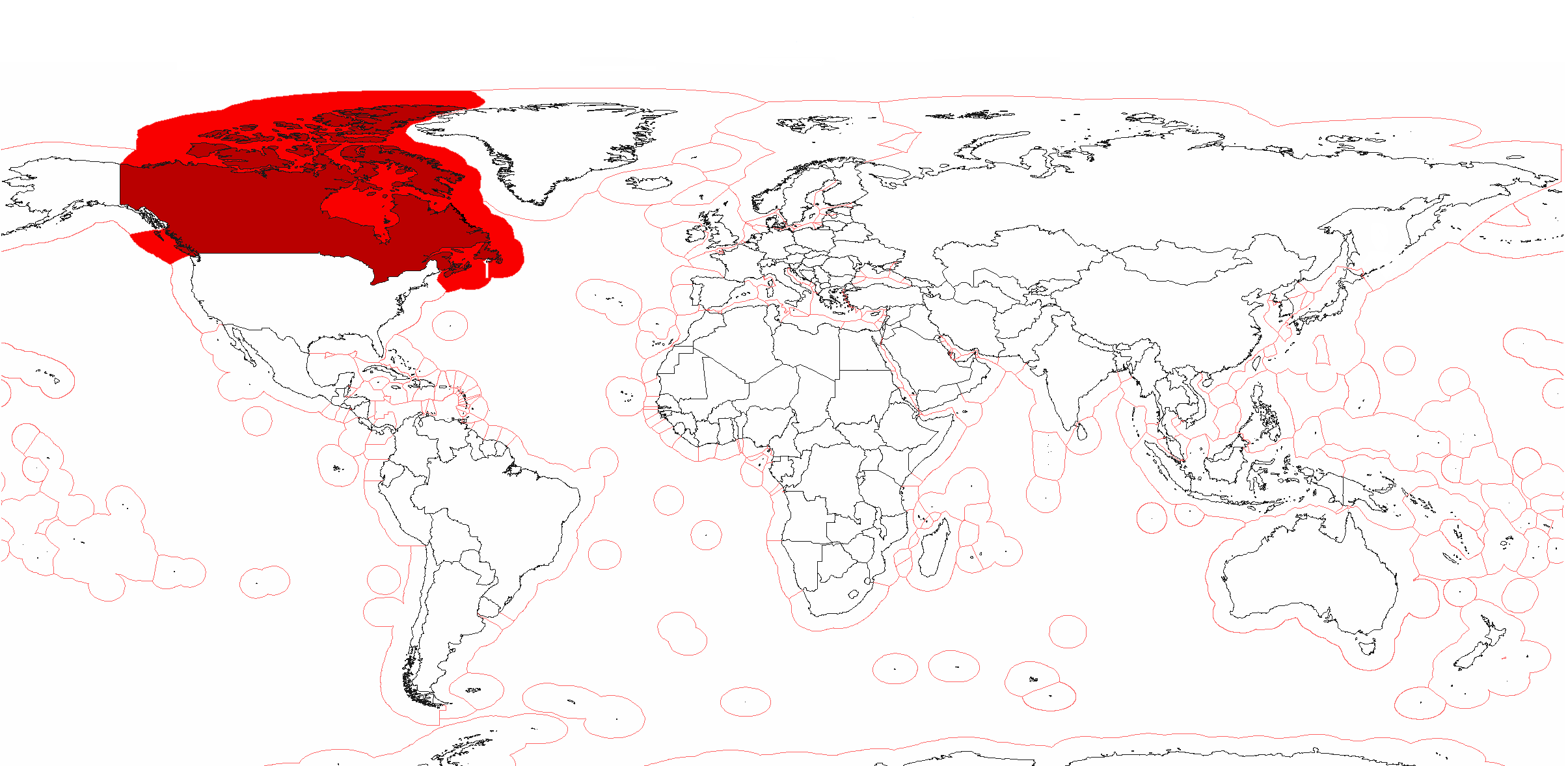
Canada's exclusive economic zone and territorial waters

Canada is unusual in that its exclusive economic zone, covering 5,599,077 km^{2} (2,161,816 mi^{2}), is slightly smaller than its territorial waters. The latter generally extend only 12 nautical miles from the shore but also include inland marine waters such as Hudson Bay (about 300 nmi (560 km) across), the Gulf of Saint Lawrence and the internal waters of the Arctic Archipelago.

==== Chile ====
Chile's exclusive economic zones, including its Antarctic claim

Chile's EEZ includes areas around the Desventuradas Islands, Easter Island, and the Juan Fernández Islands.

Region	EEZ area (km^{2})	Land area (km^{2})	Total
Mainland Chile	1,987,371	755,757	2,743,128
Easter Island	720,412	164	720,576
Juan Fernández Islands	502,524	100	502,624
Desventuradas Islands	449,836	5	449,841
Total	3,660,143	756,102.4	4,416,245.4

In 2020 and 2022, Chile submitted its partial claims to the United Nations Commission on the Limits of the Continental Shelf (CLCS) to extend its maritime continental margin.

==== China ====
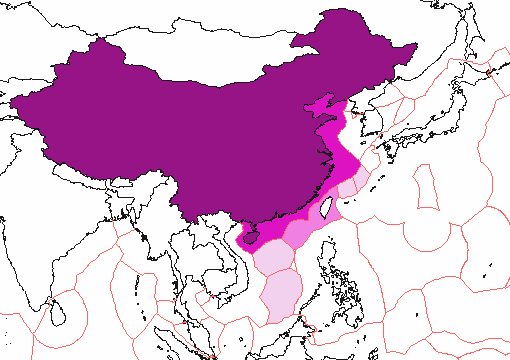
Exclusive economic zone claimed by the People's Republic of China: China's undisputed EEZ – 960,556 km^{2} EEZ claimed by China, disputed by Taiwan – 1,148,485 km^{2} EEZ claimed by China, disputed by other countries – 210,926 km^{2} Total: 2,236,430 km^{2}

The first figure excludes all disputed waters, while the last figure indicates China's claimed boundaries, and does not take into account adjacent powers' claims.

==== Croatia ====
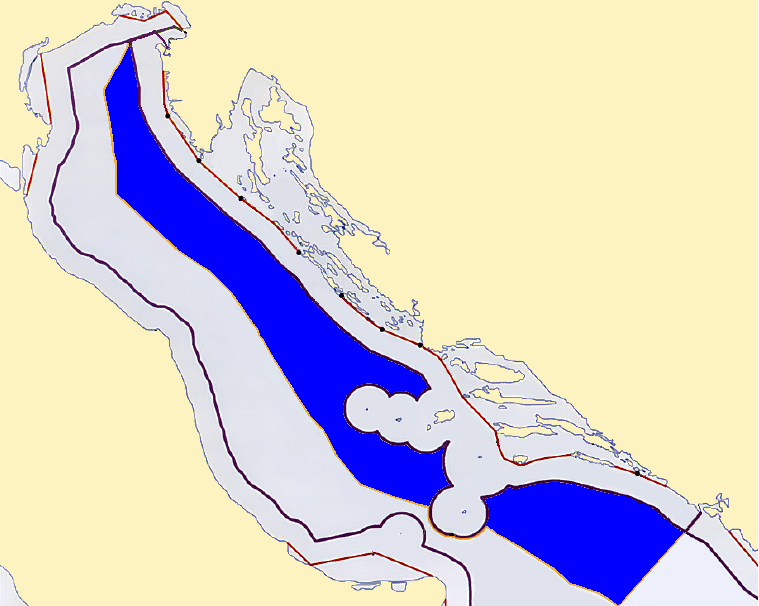
Croatia's exclusive economic zone (dark blue)

Croatia proclaimed Ecological and Fisheries Protection Zone in 2003, but it was not enforced toward other European Union states especially Italy and Slovenia. The zone was upgraded to EEZ in 2021 together with Italy and Slovenia. Territorial waters has 18,981 km^{2}, while internal waters located within the baseline cover an additional 12,498 km^{2}, and EEZ covers 24,482 km^{2} for a total of 55,961 km^{2}.

==== Cyprus ====
Cyprus EEZ covers 98,707 square km (38,100 square miles). Cyprus' EEZ borders those of Greece, Turkey, Syria, Lebanon, Israel and Egypt.

==== Denmark ====
The exclusive economic zones and territorial waters of the Kingdom of Denmark

The Kingdom of Denmark includes the constituent country (selvstyre) of Greenland and the constituent country (hjemmestyre) of the Faroe Islands.

Region	EEZ & TW area (km^{2})	Land area	Total
Denmark	105 989	42 506	149 083
Faroe Islands	260 995	1 399	262 394
Greenland	2,184,254	2,166,086	4,350,340
Total	2,551,238	2,210,579	4,761,817

==== Ecuador ====
Ecuador's exclusive economic zone

Area: 1,077,231 km^{2}

==== France ====
Exclusive economic zones of France, including its Antarctic territorial claim

Due to its numerous overseas departments and territories scattered on all oceans of the planet, France possesses one of the largest EEZs in the world, covering 10,186,624 km^{2} (3,933,078 mi^{2}). The EEZ of France covers approximately 7% of the total surface of all the EEZs of the world, whereas the land area of the French Republic is only 0.45% of the total land area of Earth.

==== Germany ====
Germany declared the establishment of its exclusive economic zone in the North and Baltic Seas on 1 January 1995. The relevant German legal provisions that are applicable within the EEZ include the Maritime Task Act (Seeaufgabengesetz) from 1965, the Maritime Facilities Act (Seeanlagengesetz) from 2017, and prior to that the Sea Facilities Ordinance (Seeanlagenverordnung) from 1997, the Federal Mining Act (Bundesberggesetz) and the Regional Planning Act (Raumordnungsgesetz).

The German EEZ has an area of 32,982 km^{2}. About 70% of the EEZ covers Germany's entire North Sea area, while some 29% encompasses the Baltic Sea area.

==== Greece ====
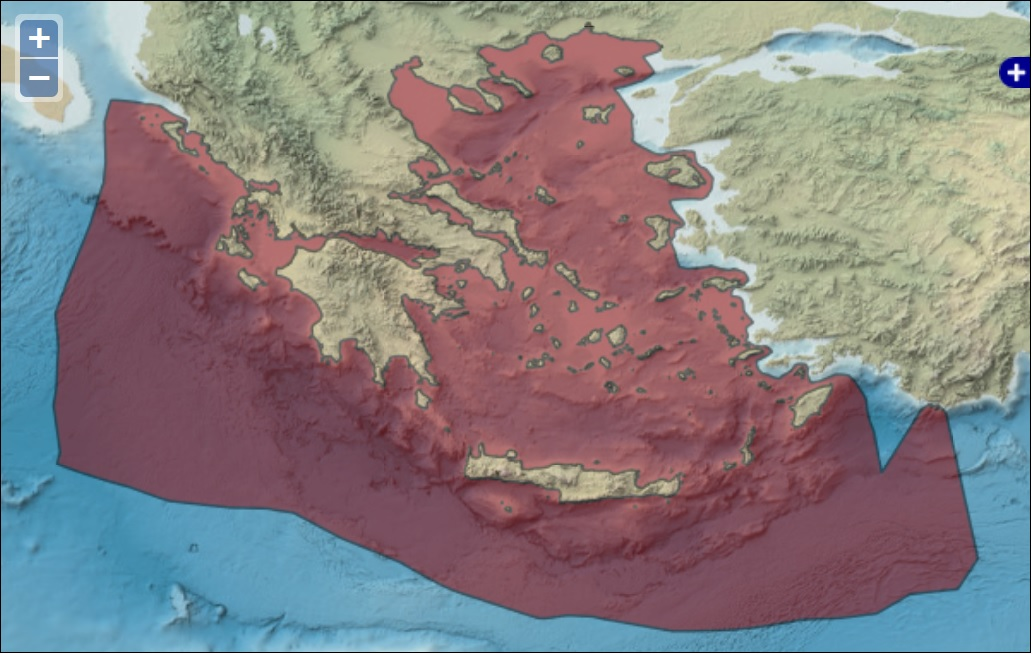
Exclusive Economic Zone of Greece

Greece forms the southernmost part of the Balkan Peninsula in the Mediterranean Sea. It includes many small islands which vary between 1,200 and 6,000 in the Aegean Sea and the Ionian Sea. The largest islands are Crete, Euboea, Lesbos, Rhodes and Chios.

Greece's EEZ is bordered to the west by Albania and Italy, to the south by Libya and Egypt, and to the east by Cyprus and Turkey.

EEZ Area of Greece
Territory	km^{2}	sq mi	Notes
Total	505,572	195,202	

==== Iceland ====
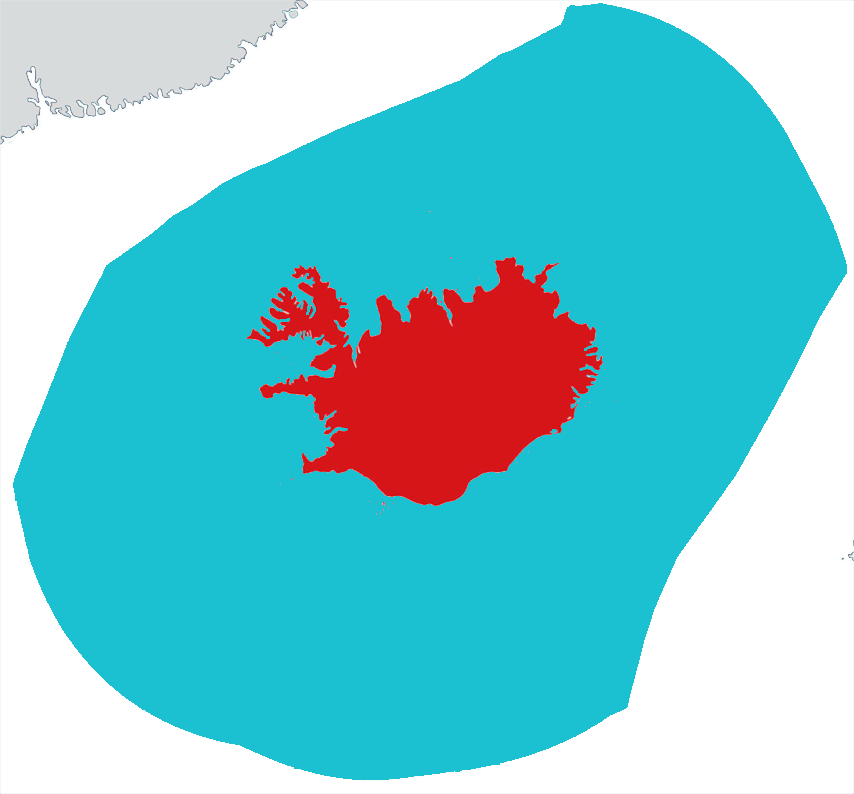
Iceland's exclusive economic zone

==== India ====
India's exclusive economic zones

EEZ	Area (km^{2})
Mainland India (9 states and 2 union territories) and Lakshadweep union territory	1,641,514 km^{2}
Andaman and Nicobar Islands union territory	663,629 km^{2}
Total	2,305,143 km^{2}

India is currently seeking to extend its EEZ to 350 miles.

==== Indonesia ====
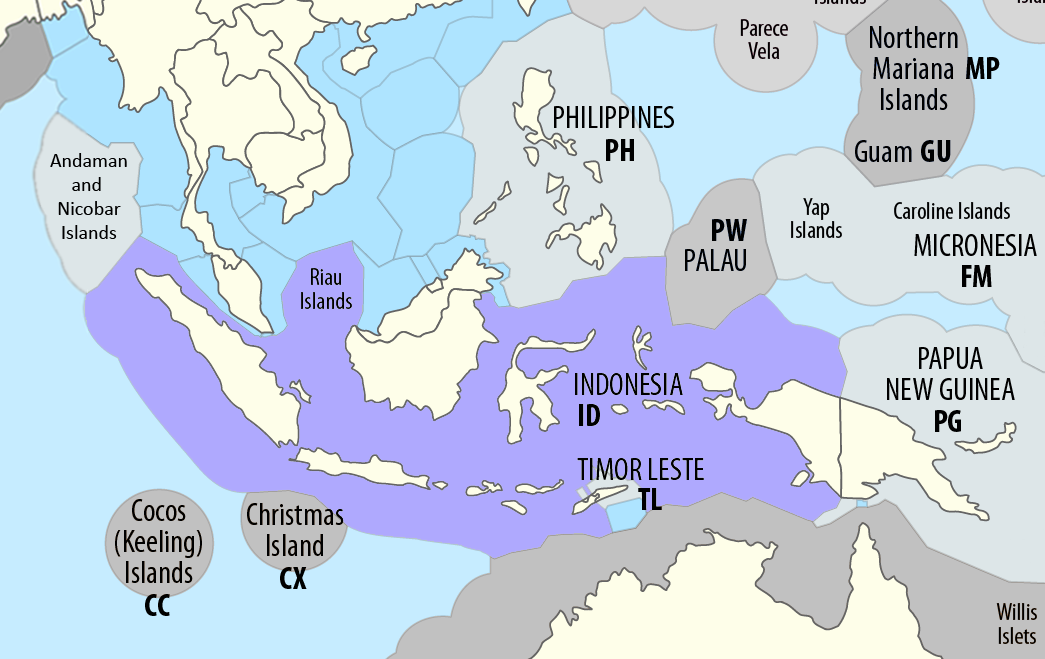
Indonesia's exclusive economic zone

Indonesia has the 6th largest exclusive economic zone in the world. The total size is 6,159,032 km^{2} (2,378,016 mi^{2}). It claims an EEZ of 200 nautical miles from its shores. This is due to the 13,466 islands of the Indonesian Archipelago. It has the 2nd largest coastline of 54,720 km (34,000 mi). The five main islands are: Sumatra, Java, Borneo, Sulawesi, and Western New Guinea. There are two major island groups (Nusa Tenggara and the Maluku Islands) and sixty smaller island groups.

==== Ireland ====
Since independence, Ireland's territorial waters were limited to 3 nautical miles (5.6 km). In 1964, her territorial waters were extended to 12 nautical miles (22 km) from the baseline covering an area of 41,000 km^{2} (16,000 mi^{2}), although several European countries retained fishing rights between 6–12 nautical miles (11–22 km). In 1976, Ireland's exclusive economic zone was extended out to 200 nautical miles (370 km), increasing her maritime area to 450,000 km^{2} (170,000 mi^{2}). In 1996, Ireland ratified the United Nations Convention on the Law of the Sea (UNCLOS) which allows her to claim the continental shelf out to 350 nautical miles (650 km) from the baseline. Ireland has made claims under UNCLOS for the Porcupine Abyssal Plain in 2005, the seabed of the Celtic Sea and Bay of Biscay in 2006, and also the Hatton Rockall area in 2009. She was awarded the Porcupine Abyssal claim in 2007 adding 39,000 km^{2} (15,000 mi^{2}) of seabed to the State's continental shelf. The other two claims are still under discussion with neighbouring states; the Celtic Sea and Bay of Biscay with France, Spain and the United Kingdom; and the Hatton Rockall area with Denmark, Iceland and the United Kingdom. In 2006, Ireland claimed her contiguous zone out to 24 nautical miles (44 km) from the baseline.

==== Israel ====
In 2010, an agreement was signed with Cyprus concerning the limit of territorial waters between Israel and Cyprus at the maritime halfway point, a clarification essential for safeguarding Israel's rights to oil and underwater gas reservoirs. The agreement was signed in Nicosia by Israeli Infrastructure Minister Uzi Landau and the Cypriot Foreign Minister Markos Kyprianou. The two countries agreed to cooperate in the development of any cross-border resources discovered and to negotiate an agreement on dividing joint resources.

==== Italy ====
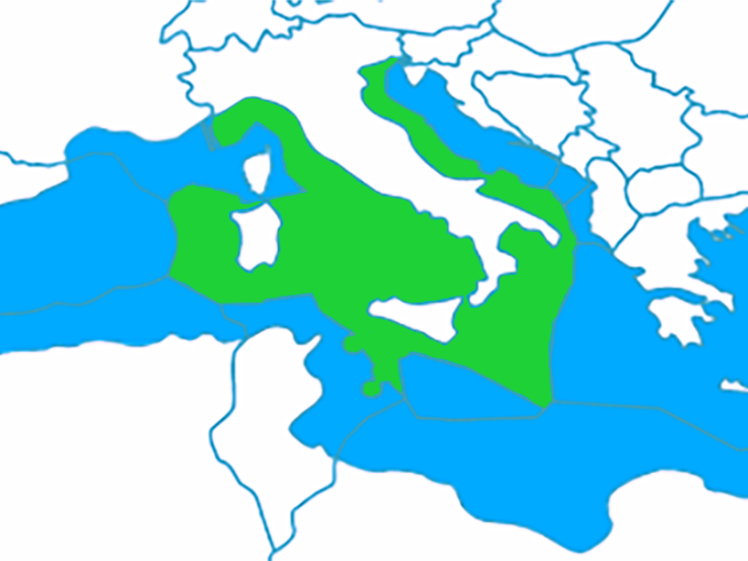
Italy's EEZ in the Mediterranean Sea

Italy has an EEZ of 541,915 km^{2} (209,235 mi^{2}). The country claims an EEZ of 200 nautical miles from its shores, and its three coastlines are the Tyrrhenian Sea to the west, the Ionian Sea to the south and the Adriatic Sea to the east. Italy's EEZ is limited by maritime boundaries with neighboring countries to the northwest, east and southeast.

Italy's western sea territory stretches from the west coast of Italy on the Tyrrhenian Sea, including the island of Sardinia. The island of Sicily is in the southernmost area. Lampedusa, a tiny island in the Mediterranean Sea, is the country's southernmost point. Italy shares treaty-defined maritime boundaries with France, Spain, Algeria, Tunisia, Libya, Malta, Greece, Albania, Montenegro, Croatia and Slovenia.

==== Japan ====
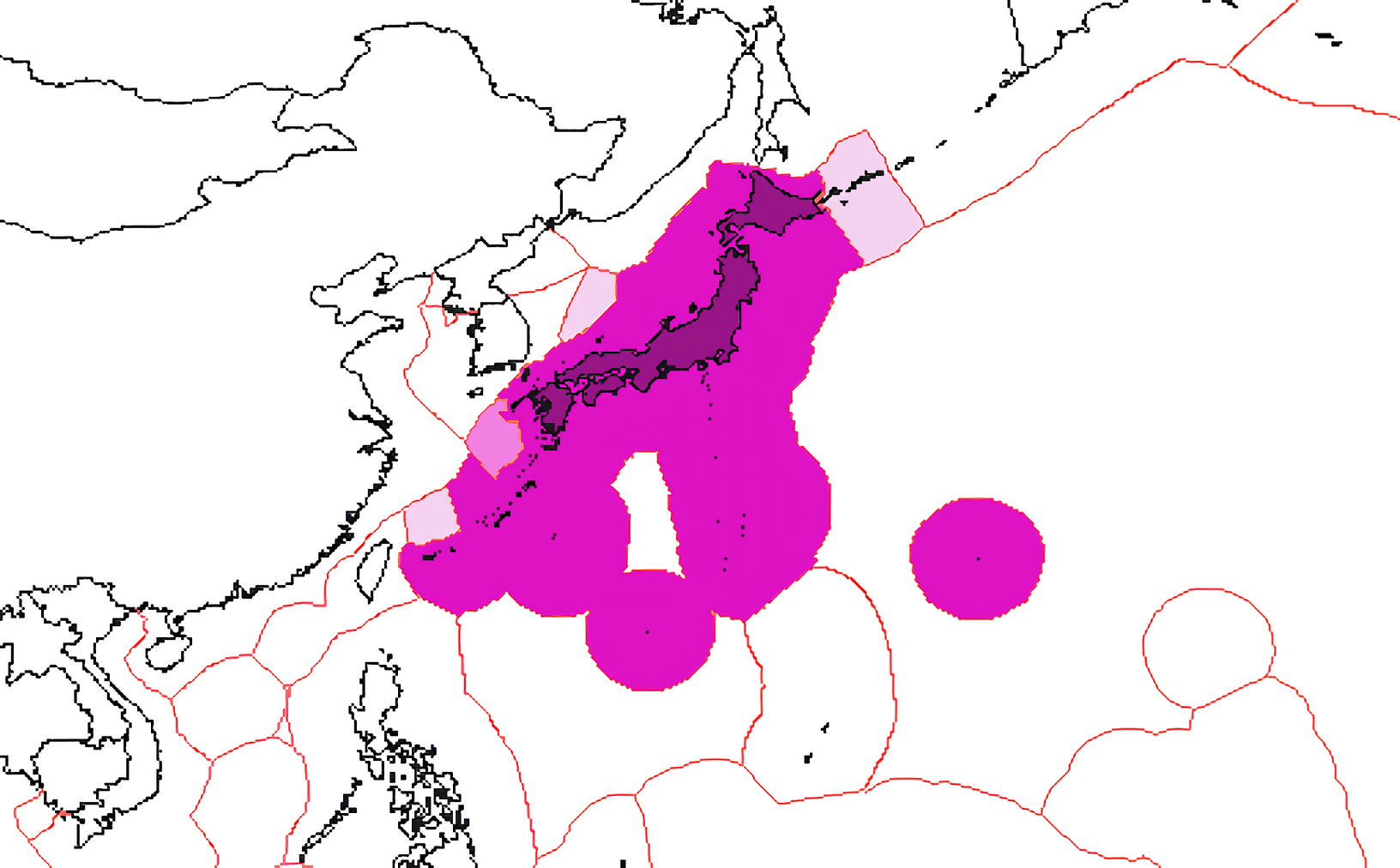
Japan's exclusive economic zones: Japan's EEZ Joint regime with the Republic of Korea EEZ claimed by Japan, disputed by others

Japan has the world's eighth-largest exclusive economic zone, covering 4,479,674 km^{2} (1,729,612 mi^{2}). It claims an EEZ of 200 nautical miles from its shores.

EEZ areas of Japan
Region	EEZ area (km^{2})	EEZ area (sq mi)
Ryukyu Islands	1,394,676	538,487
Pacific Ocean (Japan)	1,162,334	448,780
Nanpō Islands	862,782	333,122
Sea of Japan	630,721	243,523
Minami-Tori-shima	428,875	165,590
Sea of Okhotsk	235	91
Daitō Islands	44	17
Senkaku Islands	7	2.7
Total (Note: Including areas recommended by the United Nations Commission on the Limits of the Continental Shelf.)	4,479,674	1,729,612

Japan has disputes over its EEZ boundaries with all its Asian neighbors (China, Russia, South Korea, and Taiwan). The above, and relevant maps at the Sea Around Us Project both indicate Japan's claimed boundaries, and do not take into account the claims of adjacent jurisdictions.

Japan also refers to various categories of "shipping area" – Smooth Water Area, Coasting Area, Major or Greater Coasting Area, Ocean Going Area – but it is unclear whether these are intended to have any territorial or economic implications.

==== Mexico ====
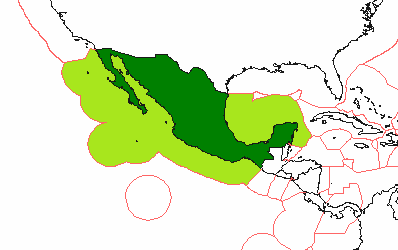
Exclusive economic zone of Mexico

Mexico's exclusive economic zones cover a total surface area of 3,269,386 km^{2}, and places Mexico among the countries with the largest areas in the world.

==== New Zealand ====
Exclusive economic zones of the Realm of New Zealand, including the Ross Dependency (shaded)

New Zealand's EEZ covers 4,083,744 km^{2} (1,576,742 mi^{2}), which is approximately fifteen times the land area of the country. Sources vary significantly on the size of New Zealand's EEZ; for example, a recent government publication gave the area as roughly 4,300,000 km^{2}. These figures are for the EEZ of New Zealand proper, and do not include the EEZs of other territories in the Realm of New Zealand (the Cook Islands, Niue, Tokelau, and the Ross Dependency).

==== North Korea ====
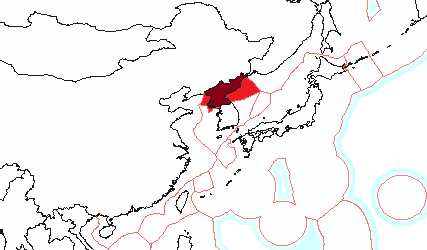
The exclusive economic zone of North Korea

The exclusive economic zone of North Korea stretches 200 nautical miles from its basepoints in both the West Sea (Yellow Sea) and the Sea of Japan. The EEZ was declared in 1977 after North Korea had contested the validity of the Northern Limit Lines (NLL) set up after the Korean War as maritime borders. The EEZ has not been codified in law and North Korea has never specified its coordinates, making it difficult to determine its specific scope.

In the West Sea, the EEZ remains unspecified in the Korea Bay because China has not determined its own EEZ in the area. The border between the North Korean and South Korean EEZs in the West Sea cannot be determined because of potential overlap and disputes over certain islands.

In the Sea of Japan, the North Korean EEZ can be approximated to be trapezoidal-shaped. The border between North Korea and Russia's respective EEZs is the only such border that has been determined in East Asia. Here, the EEZ does not cause many problems, even with regards to South Korea, because the sea is not thought to be rich in resources.

==== Norway ====
Norway's exclusive economic zones, including the dependency of Bouvet Island

The Kingdom of Norway has a large exclusive economic zone of 819,620 km^{2} around its coast. The country has a fishing zone of 1,878,953 km^{2}, including fishing zones around Svalbard and Jan Mayen.

In April 2009, the United Nations Commission for the Limits of the Continental Shelf approved Norway's claim to an additional 235,000 square kilometres of continental shelf. The commission found that Norway and Russia both had valid claims over a portion of the shelf in the Barents Sea.

Region	EEZ and territorial waters area (km^{2})	Land area (km^{2})	Total (km^{2})
Mainland Norway	1,273,482	323,802	1,597,284
Svalbard	402,574	61,002	463,576
Jan Mayen	273,118	373	273,491
Bouvet Island	436,004	49	436,053
Total	2,385,178	385,226	2,770,404

==== Pakistan ====
Area: 290,000 square kilometres (110,000 sq mi)

The coast of Pakistan is 1,046 kilometres (650 mi) long, extending from Sir Creek in the east to Gwatar Bay in the west and the EEZ extends up to 290,000 square kilometres (110,000 sq mi) which is equivalent to more than 30% of its land area and ranks sixty-sixth in the world by area.

Pakistan had an EEZ of 240,000 square kilometres (93,000 sq mi) before their case was accepted by UNCLCS. Pakistan Navy with the help of the National Oceanographic Organization (NIO) initiated the continental shelf case at ministerial level in 1995.

On 26 Aug 2013, a seven-member sub-commission with members from Japan, China, Mozambique, Kenya, Denmark, Georgia and Argentina was formulated at UNCLCS to evaluate the technical details of Pakistan's case and after a year accepted Pakistan's claim.

On 13 March 2015, UN Commission on the Limits of Continental Shelf (UNCLCS) accepted recommendations for extension of the outer limits of the continental shelf on Pakistan's case so far 80 countries had submitted claims to UNCLCS out of which recommendations of 22 countries including Pakistan had been finalised.

It was a historic event in the country's history when Pakistan became the first country in the region to have its continental shelf extended to 350 nm.

Some of the claimed territories overlapped the Omani claim. It is believed that the verdict in favour of Pakistan was announced after successful negotiation with Oman.

==== Peru ====
Peru's exclusive economic zone

Area: 857,000 km^{2}

==== Philippines ====
The Philippines' EEZ covers 2,263,816 km^{2} (874,064 mi^{2}).

==== Poland ====
The Polish EEZ covers the area of 30,533 km^{2} (11,789 mi^{2}) within the Baltic Sea.

==== Portugal ====
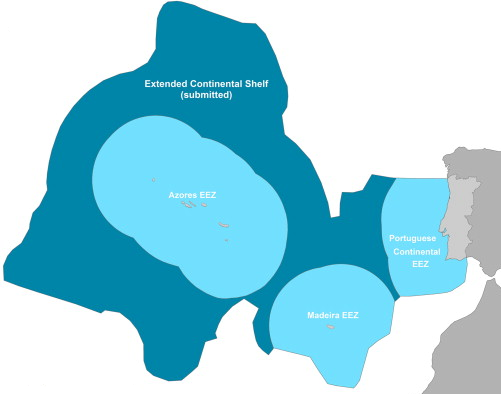
Portugal's Exclusive Economic Zones plus submitted Extended Continental Shelf to the UN

Portugal has the 20th largest EEZ in the world. Presently, it is divided in three non-contiguous sub-zones:

- Continental Portugal 327,667 km^{2}
- Azores 953,633 km^{2}
- Madeira 446,108 km^{2}
- Total : 1,727,408 km^{2}

Portugal submitted a claim to extend its jurisdiction over an additional 2.15 million square kilometres of the adjacent continental shelf in May 2009, resulting in an area with a total of more than 3,877,408 km^{2}. The submission, as well as a detailed map, can be found in the Task Group for the extension of the Continental Shelf website.

Spain previously objected to the EEZ's southern border, maintaining that it should be drawn halfway between Madeira and the Canary Islands. But Portugal exercises sovereignty over the Savage Islands, a small archipelago north of the Canaries, claiming an EEZ border further south. Spain has no longer disputed the Portuguese claim since 2015.

==== Romania ====
Area: 23,627 km^{2}

==== Russia ====
Russia's exclusive economic zone

Russia's exclusive economic zone, the world's fourth largest, is composed of:

- Kaliningrad (Baltic Sea) – 11,634 km^{2}
- Saint Petersburg (Baltic Sea) – 12,759 km^{2}
- Barents Sea – 1,308,140 km^{2}
- Black Sea (without the Crimean EEZ) – 66,854 km^{2}
- Pacific – 3,419,202 km^{2}
- Siberia – 3,277,292 km^{2}
- Total – 8,095,881 km^{2}

==== Senegal ====
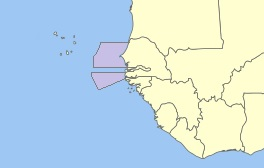
Senegal's exclusive economic zone

Area: 158,861 km^{2}

==== Somalia ====
Somalia's exclusive economic zone

Area: 825,052 km^{2}

==== South Africa ====
South Africa's exclusive economic zone

South Africa's EEZ includes both that next to the African mainland and that around the Prince Edward Islands, totalling 1,535,538 km^{2}.

- Mainland – 1,068,659 km^{2}
- Prince Edward islands – 466,879 km^{2}

==== South Korea ====
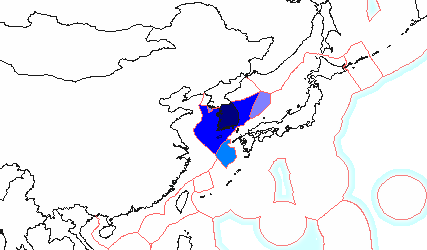
South Korean exclusive economic zone: Korean EEZ EEZ claimed by Republic of Korea and Japan Joint regime with Japan

Area: 300,851 (225,214) km^{2}

==== Spain ====
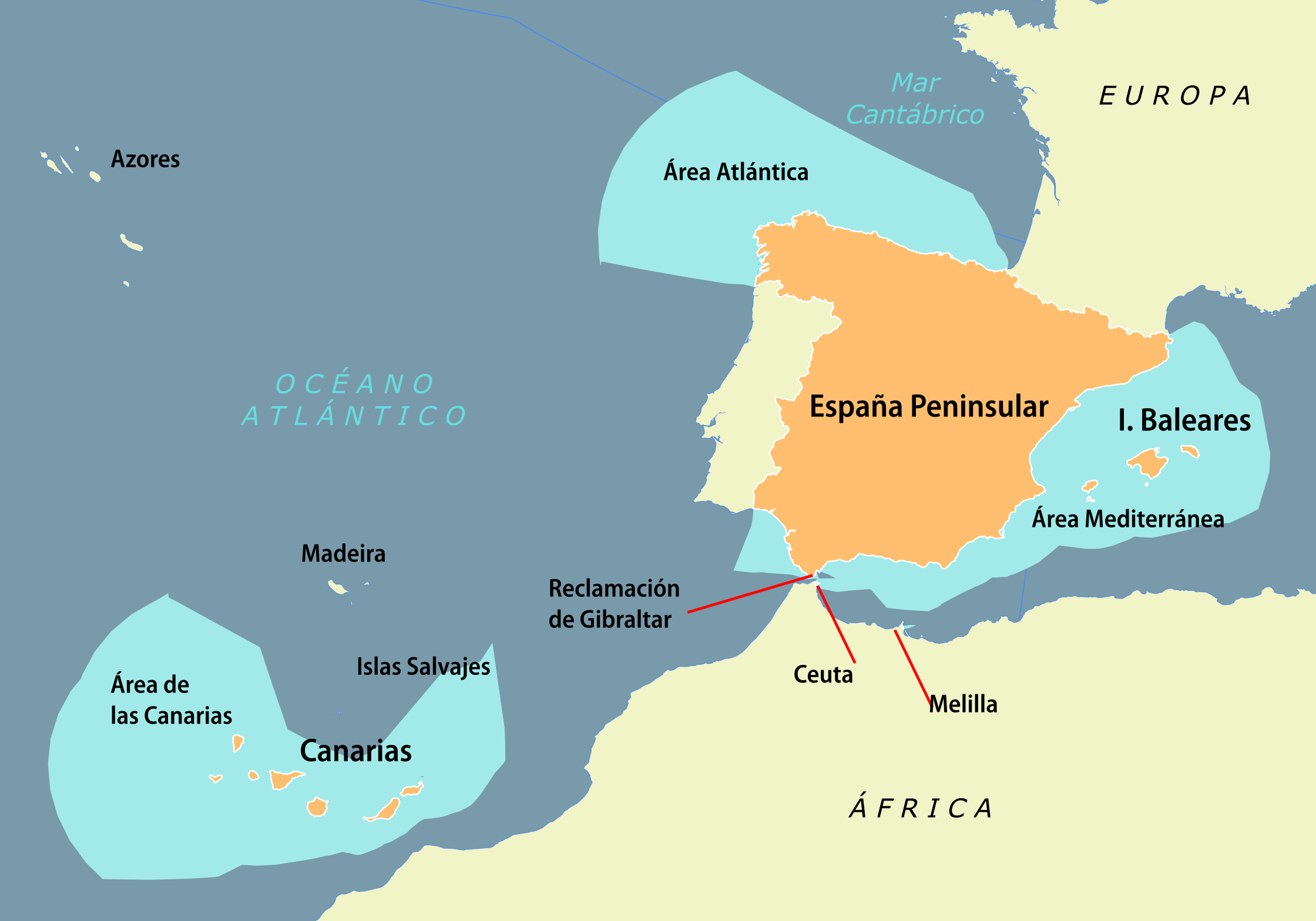
Spain's exclusive economic zone (Labels in Spanish)

Area: 1,039,233 km^{2}

==== Thailand ====
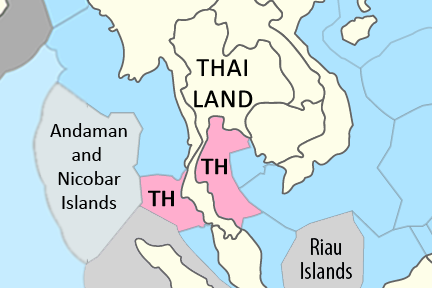
Thailand's exclusive economic zone

Area: 299,397 km^{2}

==== Turkey ====
Turkey's EEZ is bordered by Georgia, Russia, Ukraine, Romania and Bulgaria in the Black Sea to the north, Greece in the Aegean Sea to the west, and Cyprus and Syria in the Mediterranean Sea to the south. Turkey is one of the few countries to not have signed UNCLOS and disputes Greece's and Cyprus' EEZ.

==== United Kingdom ====
The exclusive economic zones of the United Kingdom in blue, including the British Overseas Territories and the Crown Dependencies. The British claim in Antarctica is shown in shaded blue.

UK, Ireland, Iceland & Faroes exclusive economic zones

The United Kingdom has the world's fifth-largest exclusive economic zone of 6,805,586 km^{2} (2,627,651 mi^{2}) square km. It comprises the EEZs surrounding the United Kingdom, the Crown Dependencies, and the British Overseas Territories. The figure does not include the EEZ of the British Antarctic Territory.

The EEZ associated with the Falkland Islands and South Georgia are disputed by Argentina. The EEZ of the Chagos Archipelago, also known as the British Indian Ocean Territory, is also disputed with Mauritius which considers the archipelago as a part of its territory. And the EEZ around Gibraltar is disputed by Spain, which claims the territory.

The EEZ areas of the United Kingdom, Crown Dependencies and British Overseas Territories (in decreasing size)
Territory	EEZ area (km^{2})	EEZ area (sq mi)	Notes
South Georgia and the South Sandwich Islands	1,449,532	559,667	Disputed with Argentina.
Pitcairn, Henderson, Ducie and Oeno Islands	836,108	322,823	
United Kingdom	773,676	298,718	Including the Isle of Man.
Tristan da Cunha^{†}	754,720	291,400	Including Gough Island.
British Indian Ocean Territory	638,568	246,552	Disputed with Mauritius.
Falkland Islands	550,872	212,693	Disputed with Argentina.
Bermuda	450,370	173,890	
Saint Helena^{†}	444,916	171,783	
Ascension Island^{†}	441,658	170,525	
Turks and Caicos Islands	154,068	59,486	
Cayman Islands	119,137	45,999	
Anguilla	92,178	35,590	
British Virgin Islands	80,117	30,933	
Channel Islands	11,658	4,501	Including Guernsey and Jersey.
Montserrat	7,582	2,927	
Gibraltar	426	164	Disputed with Spain.
Sovereign Base Areas of Akrotiri and Dhekelia	0	0	No EEZ area. The relevant EEZ areas around Cyprus Island are claimed by the Republic of Cyprus and Northern Cyprus.
Total	6,805,586	2,627,651	

^{†} A part of the overseas territory of Saint Helena, Ascension and Tristan da Cunha, which together has an EEZ of 1,641,294 square km.

==== United States ====
The USA's Exclusive Economic Zones

The United States' exclusive economic zone is the largest in the world, covering 11,351,000 km^{2}. Areas of its EEZ are located in three oceans as well as the Gulf of Mexico, and the Caribbean Sea.

The EEZ (including territorial sea) areas of the territories of the U.S. (in decreasing size)
Territory	EEZ area (km^{2})	EEZ area (sq mi)	Notes
Alaska	3,770,021	1,455,613	A non-contiguous state in the northwest extremity of the North American continent.
Hawaii – Northwestern Islands	1,579,538	609,863	Including Midway Atoll, these islands form the Leeward Islands of the Hawaiian island chain.
U.S. East Coast	915,763	353,578	The mainland coastal states of the Eastern United States. As a region, this term most often refers to the coastal states of Maine, New Hampshire, Massachusetts, Rhode Island, Connecticut, New York, New Jersey, Delaware, Maryland, Virginia, North Carolina, South Carolina, Georgia, and the Atlantic Coast of Florida.
Hawaii – Southeastern Islands	895,346	345,695	These islands form the Windward Islands of the Hawaiian island chain.
U.S. West Coast	825,549	318,746	The mainland coastal states of the Western United States. As a region, this term most often refers to the coastal states of California, Oregon, Washington.
Northern Mariana Islands	749,268	289,294	An organized, unincorporated, Commonwealth of the United States.
U.S. Gulf Coast	707,832	273,295	The mainland coastal states of the Southern United States. As a region, this term most often refers to the coastal states of Texas, Louisiana, Mississippi, Alabama, and the Gulf Coast of Florida
Johnston Atoll	442,635	170,902	A National Wildlife Refuge in the U.S. Minor Outlying Islands.
Howland and Baker Islands	434,921	167,924	Both territories are National Wildlife Refuges in the U.S. Minor Outlying Islands.
Wake Island	407,241	157,237	A National Wildlife Refuge in the U.S. Minor Outlying Islands.
American Samoa	404,391	156,136	The only inhabited, unorganized, unincorporated, territory of the United States.
Palmyra Atoll and Kingman Reef	352,300	136,000	Both territories are National Wildlife Refuges in the U.S. Minor Outlying Islands.
Jarvis Island	316,665	122,265	A National Wildlife Refuge in the U.S. Minor Outlying Islands.
Guam	221,504	85,523	An organized, unincorporated, territory of the United States.
Puerto Rico	177,685	68,605	An organized, unincorporated, Commonwealth of the United States.
U.S. Virgin Islands	33,744	13,029	An organized, unincorporated, territory of the United States.
Navassa Island	N/A (Note: The source does not provide any data for Navassa Island even though the U.S. federal government did claim an EEZ area for this disputed territory.)	N/A	A National Wildlife Refuge in the U.S. Minor Outlying Islands. (Note: A joint Cuba–Haiti Maritime Boundary Agreement signed at Havana in 1977 bilaterally divides the waters between both local nations and Cuba's maritime boundary places the island within Haitian waters and doesn't recognize any local U.S. claim in the area.)
Total	11,351,000	4,383,000	

Note, the totals in the table actually add up to 12,234,403 square km and 4,723,705 square miles.

==== Vietnam ====
Vietnam claims an exclusive economic zone (EEZ) of 1,395,096 km^{2} (538,650 mi^{2}) with 200 nautical miles from its shores. These figures do not include the claimed EEZ areas of the Paracel Islands and the Spratly Islands. Vietnam has disputes mainly with the People's Republic of China due to the nine-dash line.

== Countries with the most distant EEZs ==
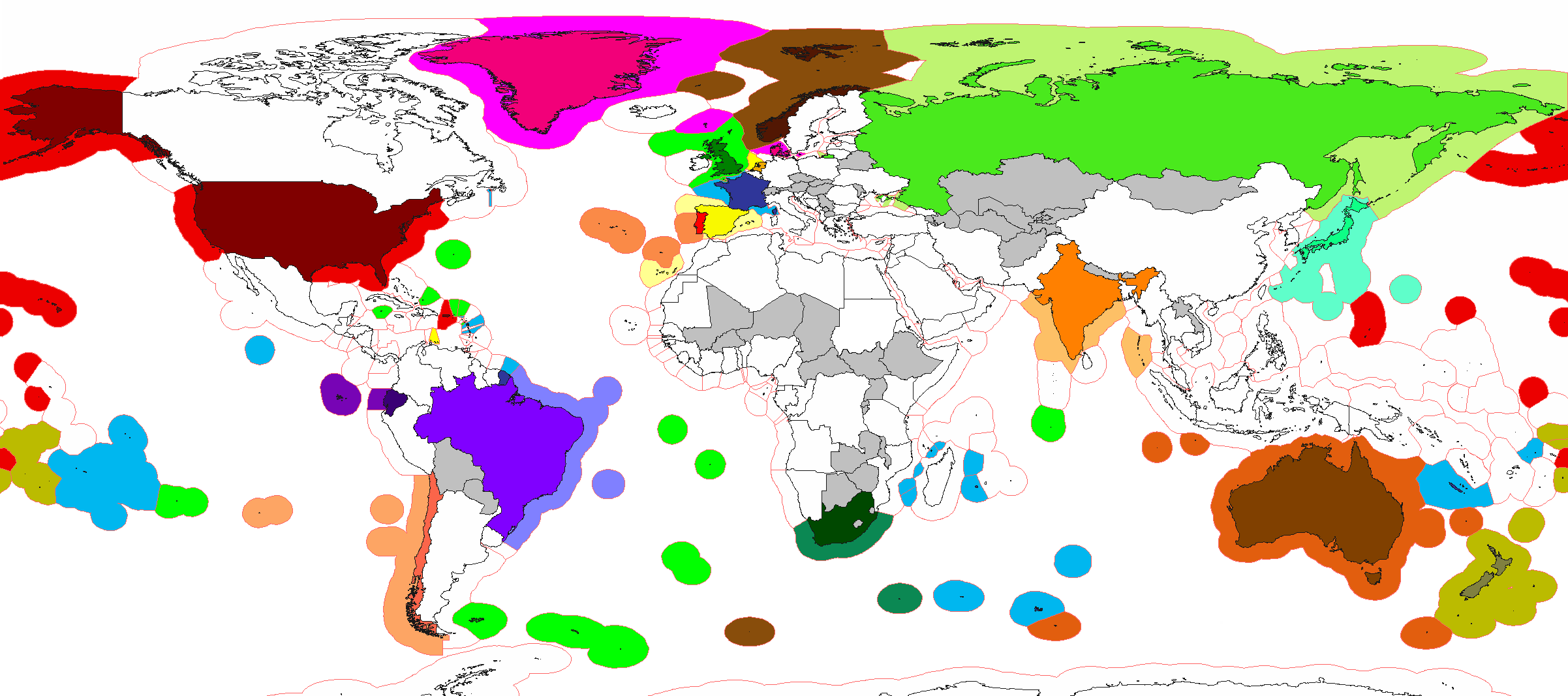
Countries with the most distant EEZs

== Rankings by area ==
Rank	Country	EEZ (km^{2})	Shelf (km^{2})	EEZ+TIA (Note: Total Internal Area (TIA), including territorial land and internal waters) (km^{2})
1	France	11,691,000	579,422	12,366,417
2	United States	11,351,000	2,193,526	21,814,306
3	Australia	8,505,348	2,194,008	16,197,464
4	Russia	7,566,673	3,817,843	24,664,915
5	United Kingdom	6,805,586	872,891	7,048,486
6	Indonesia	6,159,032	2,039,381	8,063,601
7	Canada	5,599,077	2,644,795	15,607,077
8	Japan	4,479,388	400,000	4,879,388
9	New Zealand	4,420,565	272,898	4,688,285
10	Brazil	3,830,955	2,005,179	12,346,722
11	Chile	3,681,989	252,947	4,431,381
12	Kiribati	3,441,810	7,523	3,442,536
13	Mexico	3,269,386	419,102	5,141,968
14	Micronesia	2,996,419	19,403	2,997,121
15	Denmark	2,551,238	495,657	4,761,811
16	Papua New Guinea	2,402,288	191,256	2,865,128
17	Norway	2,385,178	434,020	2,770,404
18	India	2,305,143	402,996	5,592,406
19	Marshall Islands	1,990,530	18,411	1,990,711
20	Cook Islands	1,960,027	1,213	1,960,267
21	Portugal	1,727,408	28,000	1,819,498
22	Philippines	1,590,780	272,921	1,890,780
23	Solomon Islands	1,589,477	36,282	1,618,373
24	South Africa	1,535,538	156,337	2,756,575
25	Seychelles	1,336,559	39,063	1,337,014
26	Mauritius	1,284,997	29,061	1,287,037
27	Fiji	1,282,978	47,705	1,301,250
28	Madagascar	1,225,259	101,505	1,812,300
29	Argentina	1,159,063	856,346	3,939,463
30	Ecuador	1,077,231	41,034	1,333,600
31	Spain	1,039,233	77,920	1,545,225
32	Maldives	923,322	34,538	923,622
33	Peru	906,454	82,000	2,191,670
34	China	877,019	231,340	10,473,979
35	Somalia	825,052	55,895	1,462,709
36	Colombia	808,158	53,691	1,949,906
37	Cape Verde	800,561	5,591	804,594
38	Iceland	751,345	108,015	854,345
39	Tuvalu	749,790	3,575	749,816
40	Vanuatu	663,251	11,483	675,440
41	Tonga	659,558	8,517	660,305
42	The Bahamas	654,715	106,323	668,658
43	Palau	603,978	2,837	604,437
44	Mozambique	578,986	94,212	1,380,576
45	Morocco	575,230	115,157	1,287,780
46	Costa Rica	574,725	19,585	625,825
47	Namibia	564,748	86,698	1,388,864
48	Yemen	552,669	59,229	1,080,637
49	Italy	541,915	116,834	843,251
50	Oman	533,180	59,071	842,680
51	Myanmar	532,775	220,332	1,209,353
52	Sri Lanka	532,619	32,453	598,229
53	Angola	518,433	48,092	1,765,133
54	Greece	505,572	81,451	637,529
55	South Korea	475,469	342,522	575,469
56	Venezuela	471,507	98,500	1,387,950
57	Vietnam	417,663	365,198	748,875
58	Ireland	410,310	139,935	480,583
59	Libya	351,589	64,763	2,111,129
60	Cuba	350,751	61,525	460,637
61	Panama	335,646	53,404	411,163
62	Malaysia	334,671	323,412	665,474
63	Niue	316,584	284	316,844
64	Nauru	308,480	41	308,501
65	Equatorial Guinea	303,509	7,820	331,560
66	Thailand	299,397	230,063	812,517
67	Pakistan	290,000	51,383	1,117,911
68	Egypt	263,451	61,591	1,265,451
69	Turkey	261,654	56,093	1,045,216
70	Jamaica	258,137	9,802	269,128
71	Dominican Republic	255,898	10,738	304,569
72	Liberia	249,734	17,715	361,103
73	Honduras	249,542	68,718	362,034
74	Tanzania	241,888	25,611	1,186,975
75	Ghana	235,349	22,502	473,888
76	Saudi Arabia	228,633	107,249	2,378,323
77	Nigeria	217,313	42,285	1,141,081
78	Sierra Leone	215,611	28,625	287,351
79	Gabon	202,790	35,020	470,458
80	Barbados	186,898	426	187,328
81	Ivory Coast	176,254	10,175	498,717
82	Iran	168,718	118,693	1,797,468
83	Mauritania	165,338	31,662	1,190,858
84	Comoros	163,752	1,526	165,987
85	Sweden	160,885	154,604	602,255
86	Senegal	158,861	23,092	355,583
87	Netherlands	154,011	77,246	192,345
88	Ukraine	147,318	79,142	750,818
89	Uruguay	142,166	75,327	318,381
90	Guyana	137,765	50,578	352,734
91	São Tomé and Principe	131,397	1,902	132,361
92	Samoa	127,950	2,087	130,781
93	Suriname	127,772	53,631	291,592
94	Haiti	126,760	6,683	154,510
95	Algeria	126,353	9,985	2,508,094
96	Nicaragua	123,881	70,874	254,254
97	Guinea-Bissau	123,725	39,339	159,850
98	Bangladesh	118,813	66,438	230,390
99	Kenya	116,942	11,073	697,309
100	Guatemala	114,170	14,422	223,059
101	North Korea	113,888	50,337	234,428
102	Antigua and Barbuda	110,089	4,128	110,531
103	Tunisia	101,857	67,126	265,467
104	Cyprus	98,707	4,042	107,958
105	El Salvador	90,962	16,852	112,003
106	Finland	87,171	85,109	425,590
107	Taiwan	83,231	43,016	119,419
108	Eritrea	77,728	61,817	195,328
109	Trinidad and Tobago	74,199	25,284	79,329
110	Timor-Leste	70,326	25,648	85,200
111	Sudan	68,148	19,827	1,954,216
112	Cambodia	62,515	62,515	243,550
113	Guinea	59,426	44,755	305,283
114	Croatia	59,032	50,277	115,626
115	United Arab Emirates	58,218	57,474	141,818
116	Germany	57,485	57,485	414,599
117	Malta	54,823	5,301	55,139
118	Estonia	36,992	36,992	82,219
119	Saint Vincent and the Grenadines	36,302	1,561	36,691
120	Belize	35,351	13,178	58,317
121	Bulgaria	34,307	10,426	145,186
122	Benin	33,221	2,721	145,843
123	Qatar	31,590	31,590	43,176
124	Republic of the Congo	31,017	7,982	373,017
125	Poland	29,797	29,797	342,482
126	Dominica	28,985	659	29,736
127	Latvia	28,452	27,772	93,011
128	Grenada	27,426	2,237	27,770
129	Israel	26,352	3,745	48,424
130	Romania	23,627	19,303	262,018
131	The Gambia	23,112	5,581	34,407
132	Georgia	21,946	3,243	91,646
133	Lebanon	19,516	1,067	29,968
134	Cameroon	16,547	11,420	491,989
135	Saint Lucia	15,617	544	16,156
136	Albania	13,691	6,979	42,439
137	Togo	12,045	1,265	68,830
138	Kuwait	11,026	11,026	28,844
139	Syria	10,503	1,085	195,683
140	Bahrain	10,225	10,225	10,975
141	Brunei	10,090	8,509	15,855
142	Saint Kitts and Nevis	9,974	653	10,235
143	Montenegro	7,745	3,896	21,557
144	Djibouti	7,459	3,187	30,659
145	Lithuania	7,031	7,031	72,331
146	Belgium	3,447	3,447	33,975
147	Democratic Republic of the Congo	1,606	1,593	2,346,464
148	Singapore	1,067	1,067	1,772
149	Iraq	771	771	439,088
150	Monaco	288	2	290
151	Palestine	256	256	6,276
152	Slovenia	220	220	20,493
153	Jordan	166	59	89,508
154	Bosnia and Herzegovina	50	50	51,259
155	Kazakhstan			2,724,900
156	Mongolia			1,564,100
157	Chad			1,284,000
158	Niger			1,267,000
159	Mali			1,240,192
160	Ethiopia			1,104,300
161	Bolivia			1,098,581
162	Zambia			752,612
163	Afghanistan			652,090
164	Central African Republic			622,984
165	South Sudan			619,745
166	Botswana			582,000
167	Turkmenistan			488,100
168	Uzbekistan			447,400
169	Paraguay			406,752
170	Zimbabwe			390,757
171	Burkina Faso			274,222
172	Uganda			241,038
173	Laos			236,800
174	Belarus			207,600
175	Kyrgyzstan			199,951
176	Nepal			147,181
177	Tajikistan			143,100
178	Malawi			118,484
179	Hungary			93,028
180	Azerbaijan			86,600
181	Austria			83,871
182	Western Sahara			82,500
183	Czech Republic			78,867
184	Serbia			77,474
185	Slovakia			49,035
186	Switzerland			41,284
187	Bhutan			38,394
188	Moldova			33,846
189	Lesotho			30,355
190	Armenia			29,743
191	Burundi			27,834
192	Rwanda			26,338
193	North Macedonia			25,713
194	Eswatini			17,364
195	Kosovo			10,887
196	Luxembourg			2,586
197	Andorra			468
198	Liechtenstein			160
199	San Marino			61
200	Vatican City			0.44

== Rankings by total maritime area ==
Rank	Sovereign	Territory	Total Maritime Extent = EEZ + internal + archipelagic + ECS km2 (mi2)	EEZ km2 (mi2)	24nm km2 (mi2)	12nm km2 (mi2)	Internal waters km2 (mi2)	Archipelagic waters km2 (mi2)	ECS km2 (mi2)
—	United States	Alaska	4,051,466 (2,517,464)	3,682,912 (2,288,455)	306,642 (190,539)	451,492 (280,544)	0 (0)	0 (0)	368,554 (229,009)
—	United States	American Samoa	405,830 (252,170)	405,830 (252,170)	21,589 (13,415)	9,796 (6,087)	0 (0)	0 (0)	0 (0)
—	United States	Guam	208,234 (129,391)	208,234 (129,391)	6,733 (4,184)	4,579 (2,845)	0 (0)	0 (0)	0 (0)
—	United States	Hawaii	2,474,715 (1,537,717)	2,474,715 (1,537,717)	81,882 (50,879)	53,577 (33,291)	0 (0)	0 (0)	0 (0)
—	United States	Howland and Baker Islands	434,894 (270,231)	434,894 (270,231)	8,716 (5,416)	3,355 (2,085)	0 (0)	0 (0)	0 (0)
—	United States	Jarvis Island	323,186 (200,818)	323,186 (200,818)	4,892 (3,040)	1,784 (1,109)	0 (0)	0 (0)	0 (0)
—	United States	Johnston Atoll	442,443 (274,921)	442,443 (274,921)	5,285 (3,284)	2,196 (1,365)	0 (0)	0 (0)	0 (0)
—	United States	Northern Mariana Islands	764,936 (475,309)	763,626 (474,495)	44,817 (27,848)	25,413 (15,791)	0 (0)	0 (0)	1,310 (810)
—	United States	Palmyra Atoll	353,670 (219,760)	353,670 (219,760)	8,833 (5,489)	3,935 (2,445)	0 (0)	0 (0)	0 (0)
—	United States	Puerto Rico	172,958 (107,471)	172,958 (107,471)	16,112 (10,012)	17,721 (11,011)	0 (0)	0 (0)	0 (0)
—	United States	United States	2,653,186 (1,648,613)	2,459,387 (1,528,192)	190,996 (118,679)	293,047 (182,091)	0 (0)	0 (0)	193,799 (120,421)
—	United States	United States Virgin Islands	38,275 (23,783)	38,275 (23,783)	5,609 (3,485)	5,838 (3,628)	0 (0)	0 (0)	0 (0)
—	United States	Wake Island / Enenkio	406,970 (252,880)	406,970 (252,880)	0 (0)	0 (0)	0 (0)	0 (0)	0 (0)
1	United States	Total	12,730,763 (7,910,529)	12,167,100 (7,560,300)	702,106 (436,268)	872,733 (542,291)	0 (0)	0 (0)	563,663 (350,244)
—	Australia	Australia	8,426,390 (5,235,920)	6,873,830 (4,271,200)	566,312 (351,890)	646,913 (401,973)	257,908 (160,257)	0 (0)	1,294,652 (804,459)
—	Australia	Christmas Island	327,994 (203,806)	327,994 (203,806)	5,995 (3,725)	2,960 (1,840)	0 (0)	0 (0)	0 (0)
—	Australia	Cocos Islands	467,440 (290,450)	467,440 (290,450)	6,880 (4,280)	3,746 (2,328)	0 (0)	0 (0)	0 (0)
—	Australia	Heard and McDonald Islands	1,549,931 (963,082)	417,321 (259,311)	9,346 (5,807)	6,215 (3,862)	0 (0)	0 (0)	1,132,610 (703,770)
—	Australia	Macquarie Island	555,770 (345,340)	476,278 (295,945)	8,739 (5,430)	5,417 (3,366)	27 (17)	0 (0)	79,465 (49,377)
—	Australia	Norfolk Island	430,600 (267,600)	430,600 (267,600)	5,516 (3,427)	2,440 (1,520)	0 (0)	0 (0)	0 (0)
2	Australia	Total	11,758,125 (7,306,160)	8,993,463 (5,588,279)	602,788 (374,555)	667,691 (414,884)	257,935 (160,273)	0 (0)	2,506,727 (1,557,608)
—	France	Amsterdam and Saint Paul Islands	603,978 (375,295)	512,188 (318,259)	10,229 (6,356)	4,008 (2,490)	2 (1.2)	0 (0)	91,788 (57,034)
—	France	Bassas da India	120,706 (75,003)	120,706 (75,003)	5,508 (3,423)	2,323 (1,443)	0 (0)	0 (0)	0 (0)
—	France	Clipperton Island	435,657 (270,705)	435,657 (270,705)	4,912 (3,052)	1,811 (1,125)	0 (0)	0 (0)	0 (0)
—	France	Collectivity of Saint Martin	1,131 (703)	1,100 (680)	351 (218)	692 (430)	31 (19)	0 (0)	0 (0)
—	France	Crozet Islands	912,476 (566,986)	575,454 (357,571)	15,160 (9,420)	9,098 (5,653)	54 (34)	0 (0)	336,968 (209,382)
—	France	Europa Island	127,936 (79,496)	127,936 (79,496)	5,311 (3,300)	2,046 (1,271)	0 (0)	0 (0)	0 (0)
—	France	France	446,259 (277,292)	351,400 (218,300)	46,415 (28,841)	57,158 (35,516)	16,094 (10,000)	0 (0)	78,765 (48,942)
—	France	French Guiana	199,781 (124,138)	131,247 (81,553)	6,921 (4,301)	6,788 (4,218)	2,792 (1,735)	0 (0)	65,742 (40,850)
—	France	French Polynesia	5,040,741 (3,132,171)	4,766,689 (2,961,883)	349,720 (217,310)	236,143 (146,732)	9,917 (6,162)	0 (0)	264,135 (164,126)
—	France	Guadeloupe	99,073 (61,561)	90,705 (56,361)	6,937 (4,310)	6,985 (4,340)	2,450 (1,520)	0 (0)	5,918 (3,677)
—	France	Ile Tromelin	274,555 (170,601)	274,555 (170,601)	0 (0)	0 (0)	0 (0)	0 (0)	0 (0)
—	France	Juan de Nova Island	62,775 (39,007)	62,775 (39,007)	5,323 (3,308)	2,224 (1,382)	0 (0)	0 (0)	0 (0)
—	France	Kerguelen	432,328 (268,636)	0 (0)	0 (0)	0 (0)	0 (0)	0 (0)	432,328 (268,636)
—	France	Kerguélen	556,301 (345,669)	550,817 (342,262)	18,702 (11,621)	23,132 (14,374)	5,484 (3,408)	0 (0)	0 (0)
—	France	Martinique	48,199 (29,949)	47,787 (29,693)	5,018 (3,118)	4,923 (3,059)	412 (256)	0 (0)	0 (0)
—	France	Matthew and Hunter Islands	187,184 (116,311)	187,184 (116,311)	0 (0)	0 (0)	0 (0)	0 (0)	0 (0)
—	France	Mayotte	66,738 (41,469)	66,738 (41,469)	0 (0)	0 (0)	0 (0)	0 (0)	0 (0)
—	France	New Caledonia	1,288,475 (800,621)	1,175,971 (730,715)	97,470 (60,570)	78,864 (49,004)	36,426 (22,634)	0 (0)	76,078 (47,273)
—	France	Réunion	372,437 (231,422)	315,151 (195,826)	8,922 (5,544)	5,902 (3,667)	0 (0)	0 (0)	57,286 (35,596)
—	France	Saint-Barthélemy	4,260 (2,650)	4,179 (2,597)	1,568 (974)	1,829 (1,136)	81 (50)	0 (0)	0 (0)
—	France	Saint-Pierre and Miquelon	12,588 (7,822)	12,414 (7,714)	2,486 (1,545)	3,235 (2,010)	174 (108)	0 (0)	0 (0)
—	France	Wallis and Futuna	273,970 (170,240)	250,614 (155,724)	11,837 (7,355)	5,641 (3,505)	192 (119)	0 (0)	23,164 (14,393)
3	France	Total	11,567,548 (7,187,741)	10,061,267 (6,251,781)	602,790 (374,560)	452,802 (281,358)	74,109 (46,049)	0 (0)	1,432,172 (889,910)
—	Canada	Canada	11,371,372 (7,065,843)	5,765,430 (3,582,470)	221,613 (137,704)	246,801 (153,355)	2,614,271 (1,624,433)	0 (0)	2,991,671 (1,858,938)
4	Canada	Total	11,371,372 (7,065,843)	5,765,430 (3,582,470)	221,613 (137,704)	246,801 (153,355)	2,614,271 (1,624,433)	0 (0)	2,991,671 (1,858,938)
—	Indonesia	Indonesia	9,751,687 (6,059,417)	6,019,205 (3,740,161)	262,303 (162,988)	282,871 (175,768)	0 (0)	3,093,877 (1,922,446)	638,605 (396,811)
5	Indonesia	Total	9,751,687 (6,059,417)	6,019,205 (3,740,161)	262,303 (162,988)	282,871 (175,768)	0 (0)	3,093,877 (1,922,446)	638,605 (396,811)
—	Russia	Russia	8,934,086 (5,551,384)	7,730,566 (4,803,551)	740,917 (460,384)	786,831 (488,914)	603,996 (375,306)	0 (0)	599,524 (372,527)
6	Russia	Total	8,934,086 (5,551,384)	7,730,566 (4,803,551)	740,917 (460,384)	786,831 (488,914)	603,996 (375,306)	0 (0)	599,524 (372,527)
—	New Zealand	Cook Islands	2,381,529 (1,479,814)	1,969,553 (1,223,823)	66,144 (41,100)	31,468 (19,553)	0 (0)	0 (0)	411,976 (255,990)
—	New Zealand	New Zealand	5,613,867 (3,488,295)	4,104,551 (2,550,450)	172,033 (106,896)	180,085 (111,900)	0 (0)	0 (0)	1,509,316 (937,845)
—	New Zealand	Niue	318,140 (197,680)	318,140 (197,680)	6,062 (3,767)	2,973 (1,847)	0 (0)	0 (0)	0 (0)
—	New Zealand	Tokelau	320,548 (199,179)	320,548 (199,179)	14,624 (9,087)	6,915 (4,297)	0 (0)	0 (0)	0 (0)
7	New Zealand	Total	8,634,084 (5,364,971)	6,712,792 (4,171,136)	258,863 (160,850)	221,441 (137,597)	0 (0)	0 (0)	1,921,292 (1,193,836)
—	United Kingdom	Anguilla	90,164 (56,025)	90,164 (56,025)	5,897 (3,664)	4,327 (2,689)	0 (0)	0 (0)	0 (0)
—	United Kingdom	Ascension	446,005 (277,135)	446,005 (277,135)	5,531 (3,437)	2,428 (1,509)	0 (0)	0 (0)	0 (0)
—	United Kingdom	Bermuda	464,389 (288,558)	464,389 (288,558)	6,649 (4,131)	3,544 (2,202)	0 (0)	0 (0)	0 (0)
—	United Kingdom	Bermuda Islands	438 (272)	0 (0)	0 (0)	0 (0)	438 (272)	0 (0)	0 (0)
—	United Kingdom	British Virgin Islands	81,555 (50,676)	81,555 (50,676)	5,466 (3,396)	5,058 (3,143)	0 (0)	0 (0)	0 (0)
—	United Kingdom	Cayman Islands	118,291 (73,503)	118,291 (73,503)	13,169 (8,183)	7,127 (4,429)	0 (0)	0 (0)	0 (0)
—	United Kingdom	Falkland / Malvinas Islands	908,824 (564,717)	550,566 (342,106)	0 (0)	0 (0)	0 (0)	0 (0)	358,258 (222,611)
—	United Kingdom	Gibraltar	388 (241)	388 (241)	0 (0)	0 (0)	0 (0)	0 (0)	0 (0)
—	United Kingdom	Guernsey	3,696 (2,297)	3,680 (2,290)	0 (0)	3,664 (2,277)	16 (9.9)	0 (0)	0 (0)
—	United Kingdom	Isle of Man	3,973 (2,469)	3,961 (2,461)	0 (0)	3,949 (2,454)	12 (7.5)	0 (0)	0 (0)
—	United Kingdom	Jersey	2,361 (1,467)	2,332 (1,449)	427 (265)	1,905 (1,184)	29 (18)	0 (0)	0 (0)
—	United Kingdom	Montserrat	7,188 (4,466)	7,188 (4,466)	1,686 (1,048)	1,761 (1,094)	0 (0)	0 (0)	0 (0)
—	United Kingdom	Pitcairn	842,291 (523,375)	842,291 (523,375)	19,913 (12,373)	7,500 (4,700)	0 (0)	0 (0)	0 (0)
—	United Kingdom	Saint Helena	449,215 (279,129)	449,215 (279,129)	5,710 (3,550)	2,634 (1,637)	0 (0)	0 (0)	0 (0)
—	United Kingdom	South Georgia and the South Sandwich Islands	1,237,783 (769,123)	1,237,783 (769,123)	0 (0)	0 (0)	0 (0)	0 (0)	0 (0)
—	United Kingdom	Tristan da Cunha	758,168 (471,104)	758,168 (471,104)	13,001 (8,078)	7,131 (4,431)	0 (0)	0 (0)	0 (0)
—	United Kingdom	Turks and Caicos Islands	91,025 (56,560)	91,025 (56,560)	8,591 (5,338)	15,491 (9,626)	0 (0)	0 (0)	0 (0)
—	United Kingdom	United Kingdom	780,671 (485,086)	735,271 (456,876)	100,634 (62,531)	112,588 (69,959)	45,274 (28,132)	0 (0)	126 (78)
8	United Kingdom	Total	6,286,425 (3,906,203)	5,882,272 (3,655,074)	186,674 (115,994)	179,107 (111,292)	45,769 (28,440)	0 (0)	358,384 (222,689)
—	Brazil	Brazil	5,401,366 (3,356,253)	3,205,183 (1,991,608)	159,680 (99,220)	151,171 (93,933)	106,052 (65,898)	0 (0)	2,090,131 (1,298,747)
—	Brazil	Trindade and Martim Vaz	472,481 (293,586)	472,481 (293,586)	7,484 (4,650)	3,659 (2,274)	0 (0)	0 (0)	0 (0)
9	Brazil	Total	5,873,847 (3,649,839)	3,677,664 (2,285,194)	167,164 (103,871)	154,830 (96,210)	106,052 (65,898)	0 (0)	2,090,131 (1,298,747)
—	Japan	Japan	4,756,981 (2,955,851)	4,066,513 (2,526,814)	268,756 (166,997)	247,194 (153,599)	150,737 (93,664)	0 (0)	539,731 (335,373)
—	Japan	Kuril Islands	213,723 (132,801)	213,723 (132,801)	0 (0)	0 (0)	0 (0)	0 (0)	0 (0)
—	Japan	Liancourt Rocks	1,624 (1,009)	1,624 (1,009)	0 (0)	0 (0)	0 (0)	0 (0)	0 (0)
10	Japan	Total	4,972,328 (3,089,661)	4,281,860 (2,660,620)	268,756 (166,997)	247,194 (153,599)	150,737 (93,664)	0 (0)	539,731 (335,373)
—	Chile	Chile	2,607,693 (1,620,345)	2,488,052 (1,546,004)	126,797 (78,788)	136,301 (84,694)	119,641 (74,341)	0 (0)	0 (0)
—	Chile	Easter Island	1,035,192 (643,238)	729,763 (453,454)	10,725 (6,664)	4,534 (2,817)	0 (0)	0 (0)	305,429 (189,785)
—	Chile	Islas San Félix and San Ambrosio	450,960 (280,210)	450,960 (280,210)	5,843 (3,631)	2,740 (1,700)	0 (0)	0 (0)	0 (0)
11	Chile	Total	4,093,845 (2,543,797)	3,668,775 (2,279,671)	143,365 (89,083)	143,575 (89,213)	119,641 (74,341)	0 (0)	305,429 (189,785)
—	Portugal	Azores	966,618 (600,629)	960,421 (596,778)	32,027 (19,901)	23,736 (14,749)	6,197 (3,851)	0 (0)	0 (0)
—	Portugal	Madeira	453,699 (281,915)	452,796 (281,354)	16,937 (10,524)	11,232 (6,979)	903 (561)	0 (0)	0 (0)
—	Portugal	Portugal	2,670,324 (1,659,262)	315,501 (196,043)	17,348 (10,780)	16,673 (10,360)	7,031 (4,369)	0 (0)	2,347,792 (1,458,850)
12	Portugal	Total	4,090,641 (2,541,806)	1,728,718 (1,074,176)	66,312 (41,204)	51,641 (32,088)	14,131 (8,781)	0 (0)	2,347,792 (1,458,850)
—	Denmark	Denmark	118,367 (73,550)	104,229 (64,765)	18,402 (11,434)	31,929 (19,840)	14,138 (8,785)	0 (0)	0 (0)
—	Denmark	Faeroe	905,322 (562,541)	266,560 (165,630)	11,362 (7,060)	8,279 (5,144)	3,272 (2,033)	0 (0)	635,490 (394,880)
—	Denmark	Greenland	2,735,535 (1,699,783)	2,268,623 (1,409,657)	149,147 (92,676)	155,025 (96,328)	229,236 (142,441)	0 (0)	237,676 (147,685)
13	Denmark	Total	3,759,224 (2,335,873)	2,639,412 (1,640,055)	178,911 (111,170)	195,233 (121,312)	246,646 (153,259)	0 (0)	873,166 (542,560)
—	Kiribati	Gilbert Islands	1,083,899 (673,504)	1,053,245 (654,456)	56,917 (35,367)	41,611 (25,856)	22 (14)	30,632 (19,034)	0 (0)
—	Kiribati	Line Group	1,762,248 (1,095,010)	1,641,193 (1,019,790)	43,599 (27,091)	18,623 (11,572)	621 (386)	0 (0)	120,434 (74,834)
—	Kiribati	Phoenix Group	745,901 (463,481)	745,782 (463,407)	37,141 (23,078)	14,880 (9,250)	119 (74)	0 (0)	0 (0)
14	Kiribati	Total	3,592,048 (2,231,995)	3,440,220 (2,137,650)	137,657 (85,536)	75,114 (46,674)	762 (473)	30,632 (19,034)	120,434 (74,834)
—	Mexico	Mexico	3,267,622 (2,030,406)	3,187,013 (1,980,318)	241,388 (149,992)	235,510 (146,340)	63,868 (39,686)	0 (0)	16,741 (10,402)
15	Mexico	Total	3,267,622 (2,030,406)	3,187,013 (1,980,318)	241,388 (149,992)	235,510 (146,340)	63,868 (39,686)	0 (0)	16,741 (10,402)
—	Micronesia	Micronesia	3,141,160 (1,951,830)	3,007,718 (1,868,909)	182,066 (113,131)	107,597 (66,858)	0 (0)	0 (0)	133,442 (82,917)
16	Micronesia	Total	3,141,160 (1,951,830)	3,007,718 (1,868,909)	182,066 (113,131)	107,597 (66,858)	0 (0)	0 (0)	133,442 (82,917)
—	Papua New Guinea	Papua New Guinea	3,120,254 (1,938,836)	2,402,238 (1,492,681)	131,925 (81,974)	126,559 (78,640)	0 (0)	718,016 (446,154)	0 (0)
17	Papua New Guinea	Total	3,120,254 (1,938,836)	2,402,238 (1,492,681)	131,925 (81,974)	126,559 (78,640)	0 (0)	718,016 (446,154)	0 (0)
—	India	Andaman and Nicobar	664,448 (412,869)	664,448 (412,869)	52,363 (32,537)	59,057 (36,696)	0 (0)	0 (0)	0 (0)
—	India	India	2,387,309 (1,483,405)	1,659,500 (1,031,200)	121,276 (75,357)	122,709 (76,248)	119,669 (74,359)	0 (0)	608,140 (377,880)
18	India	Total	3,051,757 (1,896,274)	2,323,948 (1,444,034)	173,639 (107,894)	181,766 (112,944)	119,669 (74,359)	0 (0)	608,140 (377,880)
—	Philippines	Philippines	2,691,489 (1,672,414)	1,964,764 (1,220,848)	101,522 (63,083)	108,744 (67,570)	0 (0)	591,370 (367,460)	135,355 (84,106)
19	Philippines	Total	2,691,489 (1,672,414)	1,964,764 (1,220,848)	101,522 (63,083)	108,744 (67,570)	0 (0)	591,370 (367,460)	135,355 (84,106)
—	Republic of Mauritius	Chagos Archipelago	831,053 (516,392)	647,678 (402,448)	22,093 (13,728)	19,325 (12,008)	725 (450)	6,582 (4,090)	176,068 (109,404)
—	Republic of Mauritius	Republic of Mauritius	1,849,613 (1,149,296)	1,278,182 (794,225)	29,937 (18,602)	17,708 (11,003)	0 (0)	1,329 (826)	570,102 (354,245)
20	Republic of Mauritius	Total	2,680,666 (1,665,689)	1,925,860 (1,196,670)	52,030 (32,330)	37,033 (23,011)	725 (450)	7,911 (4,916)	746,170 (463,650)
—	Norway	Bouvet	175,014 (108,749)	0 (0)	5,313 (3,301)	2,209 (1,373)	6 (3.7)	0 (0)	175,008 (108,745)
—	Norway	Jan Mayen	292,932 (182,020)	292,907 (182,004)	6,393 (3,972)	4,301 (2,673)	25 (16)	0 (0)	0 (0)
—	Norway	Norway	1,213,377 (753,958)	934,825 (580,873)	57,493 (35,724)	56,269 (34,964)	87,438 (54,331)	0 (0)	191,114 (118,753)
—	Norway	Svalbard	837,829 (520,603)	796,819 (495,120)	64,877 (40,313)	54,217 (33,689)	36,441 (22,643)	0 (0)	4,569 (2,839)
21	Norway	Total	2,519,152 (1,565,328)	2,024,551 (1,257,998)	134,076 (83,311)	116,996 (72,698)	123,910 (76,990)	0 (0)	370,691 (230,337)
—	Argentina	Argentina	2,351,264 (1,461,008)	1,075,192 (668,093)	69,917 (43,444)	71,935 (44,698)	74,569 (46,335)	0 (0)	1,201,503 (746,579)
22	Argentina	Total	2,351,264 (1,461,008)	1,075,192 (668,093)	69,917 (43,444)	71,935 (44,698)	74,569 (46,335)	0 (0)	1,201,503 (746,579)
—	Madagascar	Glorioso Islands	43,506 (27,033)	43,506 (27,033)	0 (0)	0 (0)	0 (0)	0 (0)	0 (0)
—	Madagascar	Madagascar	2,096,076 (1,302,441)	1,196,285 (743,337)	88,127 (54,760)	86,034 (53,459)	40,955 (25,448)	0 (0)	858,836 (533,656)
23	Madagascar	Total	2,139,582 (1,329,475)	1,239,791 (770,370)	88,127 (54,760)	86,034 (53,459)	40,955 (25,448)	0 (0)	858,836 (533,656)
—	Marshall Islands	Marshall Islands	2,122,013 (1,318,558)	2,002,220 (1,244,120)	125,266 (77,837)	105,434 (65,514)	11,216 (6,969)	108,577 (67,467)	0 (0)
24	Marshall Islands	Total	2,122,013 (1,318,558)	2,002,220 (1,244,120)	125,266 (77,837)	105,434 (65,514)	11,216 (6,969)	108,577 (67,467)	0 (0)
—	Sri Lanka	Sri Lanka	1,861,189 (1,156,489)	533,559 (331,538)	26,002 (16,157)	31,342 (19,475)	0 (0)	0 (0)	1,327,630 (824,950)
25	Sri Lanka	Total	1,861,189 (1,156,489)	533,559 (331,538)	26,002 (16,157)	31,342 (19,475)	0 (0)	0 (0)	1,327,630 (824,950)
—	South Africa	Prince Edward Islands	474,897 (295,087)	474,897 (295,087)	7,300 (4,500)	4,429 (2,752)	0 (0)	0 (0)	0 (0)
—	South Africa	South Africa	1,358,947 (844,411)	1,072,679 (666,532)	57,212 (35,550)	57,075 (35,465)	10,161 (6,314)	0 (0)	276,107 (171,565)
26	South Africa	Total	1,833,844 (1,139,498)	1,547,576 (961,619)	64,512 (40,086)	61,504 (38,217)	10,161 (6,314)	0 (0)	276,107 (171,565)
—	Solomon Islands	Solomon Islands	1,731,877 (1,076,138)	1,602,781 (995,922)	105,611 (65,624)	83,232 (51,718)	0 (0)	129,096 (80,217)	0 (0)
27	Solomon Islands	Total	1,731,877 (1,076,138)	1,602,781 (995,922)	105,611 (65,624)	83,232 (51,718)	0 (0)	129,096 (80,217)	0 (0)
—	Fiji	Fiji	1,699,215 (1,055,843)	1,302,114 (809,096)	54,601 (33,927)	45,318 (28,159)	0 (0)	156,078 (96,982)	241,023 (149,765)
28	Fiji	Total	1,699,215 (1,055,843)	1,302,114 (809,096)	54,601 (33,927)	45,318 (28,159)	0 (0)	156,078 (96,982)	241,023 (149,765)
—	Namibia	Namibia	1,620,658 (1,007,030)	562,212 (349,342)	32,368 (20,113)	33,183 (20,619)	0 (0)	0 (0)	1,058,446 (657,688)
29	Namibia	Total	1,620,658 (1,007,030)	562,212 (349,342)	32,368 (20,113)	33,183 (20,619)	0 (0)	0 (0)	1,058,446 (657,688)
—	Cape Verde	Cape Verde	1,457,966 (905,938)	801,936 (498,300)	26,659 (16,565)	23,701 (14,727)	0 (0)	35,927 (22,324)	620,103 (385,314)
30	Cape Verde	Total	1,457,966 (905,938)	801,936 (498,300)	26,659 (16,565)	23,701 (14,727)	0 (0)	35,927 (22,324)	620,103 (385,314)
—	China	China	1,456,089 (904,772)	1,302,395 (809,271)	120,557 (74,911)	143,002 (88,857)	153,694 (95,501)	0 (0)	0 (0)
31	China	Total	1,456,089 (904,772)	1,302,395 (809,271)	120,557 (74,911)	143,002 (88,857)	153,694 (95,501)	0 (0)	0 (0)
—	Seychelles	Seychelles	1,364,697 (847,983)	1,341,524 (833,584)	69,809 (43,377)	45,268 (28,128)	0 (0)	8,559 (5,318)	14,614 (9,081)
32	Seychelles	Total	1,364,697 (847,983)	1,341,524 (833,584)	69,809 (43,377)	45,268 (28,128)	0 (0)	8,559 (5,318)	14,614 (9,081)
—	Spain	Alhucemas Islands	14 (8.7)	14 (8.7)	0 (0)	0 (0)	0 (0)	0 (0)	0 (0)
—	Spain	Canary Islands	721,496 (448,317)	445,910 (277,080)	40,349 (25,072)	32,020 (19,900)	2,411 (1,498)	0 (0)	273,175 (169,743)
—	Spain	Ceuta	33 (21)	33 (21)	0 (0)	0 (0)	0 (0)	0 (0)	0 (0)
—	Spain	Chafarinas Islands	26 (16)	26 (16)	0 (0)	0 (0)	0 (0)	0 (0)	0 (0)
—	Spain	Melilla	27 (17)	27 (17)	0 (0)	0 (0)	0 (0)	0 (0)	0 (0)
—	Spain	Peñón de Vélez de la Gomera	4 (2.5)	4 (2.5)	0 (0)	0 (0)	0 (0)	0 (0)	0 (0)
—	Spain	Perejil Island	1 (0.62)	1 (0.62)	0 (0)	0 (0)	0 (0)	0 (0)	0 (0)
—	Spain	Spain	606,364 (376,777)	561,763 (349,063)	78,332 (48,673)	71,299 (44,303)	12,482 (7,756)	0 (0)	32,119 (19,958)
33	Spain	Total	1,327,965 (825,159)	1,007,778 (626,204)	118,681 (73,745)	103,319 (64,199)	14,893 (9,254)	0 (0)	305,294 (189,701)
—	Federal Republic of Somalia	Federal Republic of Somalia	1,299,720 (807,610)	821,444 (510,422)	67,465 (41,921)	69,430 (43,140)	0 (0)	0 (0)	478,276 (297,187)
34	Federal Republic of Somalia	Total	1,299,720 (807,610)	821,444 (510,422)	67,465 (41,921)	69,430 (43,140)	0 (0)	0 (0)	478,276 (297,187)
—	Iceland	Iceland	1,205,014 (748,761)	808,771 (502,547)	42,904 (26,659)	38,584 (23,975)	36,011 (22,376)	0 (0)	360,232 (223,838)
35	Iceland	Total	1,205,014 (748,761)	808,771 (502,547)	42,904 (26,659)	38,584 (23,975)	36,011 (22,376)	0 (0)	360,232 (223,838)
—	Ecuador	Ecuador	276,661 (171,909)	254,956 (158,422)	13,182 (8,191)	13,434 (8,348)	21,705 (13,487)	0 (0)	0 (0)
—	Ecuador	Galapagos	886,941 (551,120)	841,438 (522,845)	27,341 (16,989)	24,247 (15,066)	45,503 (28,274)	0 (0)	0 (0)
36	Ecuador	Total	1,163,602 (723,029)	1,096,394 (681,268)	40,523 (25,180)	37,681 (23,414)	67,208 (41,761)	0 (0)	0 (0)
—	Maldives	Maldives	1,159,130 (720,250)	923,833 (574,043)	44,740 (27,800)	41,953 (26,068)	0 (0)	71,547 (44,457)	163,750 (101,750)
37	Maldives	Total	1,159,130 (720,250)	923,833 (574,043)	44,740 (27,800)	41,953 (26,068)	0 (0)	71,547 (44,457)	163,750 (101,750)
—	Bahamas	Bahamas	1,056,131 (656,249)	619,785 (385,117)	40,134 (24,938)	51,942 (32,275)	0 (0)	236,668 (147,059)	199,678 (124,074)
38	Bahamas	Total	1,056,131 (656,249)	619,785 (385,117)	40,134 (24,938)	51,942 (32,275)	0 (0)	236,668 (147,059)	199,678 (124,074)
—	Peru	Peru	888,037 (551,801)	870,789 (541,083)	51,296 (31,874)	52,059 (32,348)	17,248 (10,717)	0 (0)	0 (0)
39	Peru	Total	888,037 (551,801)	870,789 (541,083)	51,296 (31,874)	52,059 (32,348)	17,248 (10,717)	0 (0)	0 (0)
—	Vietnam	Vietnam	853,092 (530,087)	752,197 (467,394)	57,748 (35,883)	61,395 (38,149)	100,895 (62,693)	0 (0)	0 (0)
40	Vietnam	Total	853,092 (530,087)	752,197 (467,394)	57,748 (35,883)	61,395 (38,149)	100,895 (62,693)	0 (0)	0 (0)
—	Oman	Oman	827,997 (514,493)	556,490 (345,790)	40,557 (25,201)	43,877 (27,264)	9,618 (5,976)	0 (0)	261,889 (162,730)
41	Oman	Total	827,997 (514,493)	556,490 (345,790)	40,557 (25,201)	43,877 (27,264)	9,618 (5,976)	0 (0)	261,889 (162,730)
—	Colombia	Bajo Nuevo Bank	1,550 (960)	1,550 (960)	0 (0)	1,550 (960)	0 (0)	0 (0)	0 (0)
—	Colombia	Colombia	757,350 (470,600)	719,207 (446,895)	50,863 (31,605)	44,340 (27,550)	38,143 (23,701)	0 (0)	0 (0)
—	Colombia	Quitasueño Bank	3,689 (2,292)	3,689 (2,292)	0 (0)	0 (0)	0 (0)	0 (0)	0 (0)
—	Colombia	Serrana Bank	2,838 (1,763)	2,838 (1,763)	0 (0)	6,527 (4,056)	0 (0)	0 (0)	0 (0)
—	Colombia	Serranilla Bank	1,552 (964)	1,552 (964)	0 (0)	1,552 (964)	0 (0)	0 (0)	0 (0)
42	Colombia	Total	766,979 (476,579)	728,836 (452,878)	50,863 (31,605)	53,969 (33,535)	38,143 (23,701)	0 (0)	0 (0)
—	Tuvalu	Tuvalu	756,991 (470,372)	753,133 (467,975)	42,324 (26,299)	23,267 (14,457)	0 (0)	3,858 (2,397)	0 (0)
43	Tuvalu	Total	756,991 (470,372)	753,133 (467,975)	42,324 (26,299)	23,267 (14,457)	0 (0)	3,858 (2,397)	0 (0)
—	Vanuatu	Vanuatu	696,674 (432,893)	625,850 (388,890)	46,657 (28,991)	43,566 (27,071)	0 (0)	70,824 (44,008)	0 (0)
44	Vanuatu	Total	696,674 (432,893)	625,850 (388,890)	46,657 (28,991)	43,566 (27,071)	0 (0)	70,824 (44,008)	0 (0)
—	Palau	Palau	693,609 (430,989)	616,431 (383,032)	37,478 (23,288)	34,083 (21,178)	54,777 (34,037)	0 (0)	22,401 (13,919)
45	Palau	Total	693,609 (430,989)	616,431 (383,032)	37,478 (23,288)	34,083 (21,178)	54,777 (34,037)	0 (0)	22,401 (13,919)
—	Mozambique	Mozambique	687,601 (427,255)	566,292 (351,878)	53,182 (33,046)	56,141 (34,884)	14,238 (8,847)	0 (0)	107,071 (66,531)
46	Mozambique	Total	687,601 (427,255)	566,292 (351,878)	53,182 (33,046)	56,141 (34,884)	14,238 (8,847)	0 (0)	107,071 (66,531)
—	Tonga	Tonga	666,678 (414,255)	666,052 (413,866)	49,232 (30,591)	35,838 (22,269)	0 (0)	0 (0)	626 (389)
47	Tonga	Total	666,678 (414,255)	666,052 (413,866)	49,232 (30,591)	35,838 (22,269)	0 (0)	0 (0)	626 (389)
—	Malaysia	Malaysia	620,170 (385,360)	517,876 (321,793)	45,986 (28,574)	63,708 (39,586)	102,294 (63,563)	0 (0)	0 (0)
48	Malaysia	Total	620,170 (385,360)	517,876 (321,793)	45,986 (28,574)	63,708 (39,586)	102,294 (63,563)	0 (0)	0 (0)
—	Costa Rica	Costa Rica	611,917 (380,228)	599,063 (372,240)	21,794 (13,542)	18,627 (11,574)	12,854 (7,987)	0 (0)	0 (0)
49	Costa Rica	Total	611,917 (380,228)	599,063 (372,240)	21,794 (13,542)	18,627 (11,574)	12,854 (7,987)	0 (0)	0 (0)
—	Myanmar	Myanmar	609,260 (378,580)	497,460 (309,110)	43,401 (26,968)	40,428 (25,121)	111,800 (69,500)	0 (0)	0 (0)
50	Myanmar	Total	609,260 (378,580)	497,460 (309,110)	43,401 (26,968)	40,428 (25,121)	111,800 (69,500)	0 (0)	0 (0)
—	Italy	Italy	582,757 (362,108)	536,446 (333,332)	96,290 (59,830)	108,928 (67,685)	46,311 (28,776)	0 (0)	0 (0)
51	Italy	Total	582,757 (362,108)	536,446 (333,332)	96,290 (59,830)	108,928 (67,685)	46,311 (28,776)	0 (0)	0 (0)
—	Yemen	Yemen	539,276 (335,091)	527,384 (327,701)	55,136 (34,260)	69,797 (43,370)	0 (0)	0 (0)	11,892 (7,389)
52	Yemen	Total	539,276 (335,091)	527,384 (327,701)	55,136 (34,260)	69,797 (43,370)	0 (0)	0 (0)	11,892 (7,389)
—	Angola	Angola	497,159 (308,920)	495,866 (308,117)	32,733 (20,339)	34,184 (21,241)	1,293 (803)	0 (0)	0 (0)
53	Angola	Total	497,159 (308,920)	495,866 (308,117)	32,733 (20,339)	34,184 (21,241)	1,293 (803)	0 (0)	0 (0)
—	Ireland	Ireland	491,474 (305,388)	428,004 (265,949)	28,338 (17,608)	28,070 (17,440)	11,180 (6,950)	0 (0)	52,290 (32,490)
54	Ireland	Total	491,474 (305,388)	428,004 (265,949)	28,338 (17,608)	28,070 (17,440)	11,180 (6,950)	0 (0)	52,290 (32,490)
—	Venezuela	Venezuela	490,795 (304,966)	473,659 (294,318)	70,432 (43,764)	75,009 (46,608)	17,136 (10,648)	0 (0)	0 (0)
55	Venezuela	Total	490,795 (304,966)	473,659 (294,318)	70,432 (43,764)	75,009 (46,608)	17,136 (10,648)	0 (0)	0 (0)
—	Greece	Greece	482,936 (300,083)	482,936 (300,083)	69,347 (43,090)	184,446 (114,609)	0 (0)	0 (0)	0 (0)
56	Greece	Total	482,936 (300,083)	482,936 (300,083)	69,347 (43,090)	184,446 (114,609)	0 (0)	0 (0)	0 (0)
—	South Korea	South Korea	473,797 (294,404)	430,281 (267,364)	40,389 (25,097)	40,087 (24,909)	43,516 (27,040)	0 (0)	0 (0)
57	South Korea	Total	473,797 (294,404)	430,281 (267,364)	40,389 (25,097)	40,087 (24,909)	43,516 (27,040)	0 (0)	0 (0)
—	Libya	Libya	440,405 (273,655)	357,386 (222,069)	30,437 (18,913)	29,531 (18,350)	83,019 (51,586)	0 (0)	0 (0)
58	Libya	Total	440,405 (273,655)	357,386 (222,069)	30,437 (18,913)	29,531 (18,350)	83,019 (51,586)	0 (0)	0 (0)
—	Taiwan	Senkaku Islands	73,794 (45,853)	73,794 (45,853)	0 (0)	0 (0)	0 (0)	0 (0)	0 (0)
—	Taiwan	Taiwan	355,433 (220,856)	355,433 (220,856)	0 (0)	0 (0)	0 (0)	0 (0)	0 (0)
59	Taiwan	Total	429,227 (266,709)	429,227 (266,709)	0 (0)	0 (0)	0 (0)	0 (0)	0 (0)
—	Cuba	Cuba	420,018 (260,987)	352,259 (218,884)	49,872 (30,989)	55,883 (34,724)	66,373 (41,242)	0 (0)	1,386 (861)
60	Cuba	Total	420,018 (260,987)	352,259 (218,884)	49,872 (30,989)	55,883 (34,724)	66,373 (41,242)	0 (0)	1,386 (861)
—	Dominican Republic	Dominican Republic	413,630 (257,020)	363,805 (226,058)	24,449 (15,192)	24,990 (15,530)	0 (0)	49,825 (30,960)	0 (0)
61	Dominican Republic	Total	413,630 (257,020)	363,805 (226,058)	24,449 (15,192)	24,990 (15,530)	0 (0)	49,825 (30,960)	0 (0)
—	Panama	Panama	396,047 (246,092)	331,318 (205,871)	26,206 (16,284)	26,708 (16,596)	64,729 (40,221)	0 (0)	0 (0)
62	Panama	Total	396,047 (246,092)	331,318 (205,871)	26,206 (16,284)	26,708 (16,596)	64,729 (40,221)	0 (0)	0 (0)
—	Thailand	Thailand	359,347 (223,288)	298,561 (185,517)	37,326 (23,193)	50,558 (31,415)	60,786 (37,771)	0 (0)	0 (0)
63	Thailand	Total	359,347 (223,288)	298,561 (185,517)	37,326 (23,193)	50,558 (31,415)	60,786 (37,771)	0 (0)	0 (0)
—	Tanzania	Tanzania	328,709 (204,250)	241,567 (150,103)	15,018 (9,332)	15,940 (9,900)	27,397 (17,024)	0 (0)	59,745 (37,124)
64	Tanzania	Total	328,709 (204,250)	241,567 (150,103)	15,018 (9,332)	15,940 (9,900)	27,397 (17,024)	0 (0)	59,745 (37,124)
—	Liberia	Liberia	322,550 (200,420)	251,781 (156,449)	12,560 (7,800)	12,687 (7,883)	0 (0)	0 (0)	70,769 (43,974)
65	Liberia	Total	322,550 (200,420)	251,781 (156,449)	12,560 (7,800)	12,687 (7,883)	0 (0)	0 (0)	70,769 (43,974)
—	Nauru	Nauru	309,263 (192,167)	309,261 (192,166)	5,068 (3,149)	1,962 (1,219)	2 (1.2)	0 (0)	0 (0)
66	Nauru	Total	309,263 (192,167)	309,261 (192,166)	5,068 (3,149)	1,962 (1,219)	2 (1.2)	0 (0)	0 (0)
—	Equatorial Guinea	Equatorial Guinea	304,133 (188,979)	304,133 (188,979)	16,451 (10,222)	12,964 (8,055)	0 (0)	0 (0)	0 (0)
67	Equatorial Guinea	Total	304,133 (188,979)	304,133 (188,979)	16,451 (10,222)	12,964 (8,055)	0 (0)	0 (0)	0 (0)
—	Saudi Arabia	Saudi Arabia	298,408 (185,422)	224,157 (139,285)	40,356 (25,076)	47,333 (29,411)	74,251 (46,137)	0 (0)	0 (0)
68	Saudi Arabia	Total	298,408 (185,422)	224,157 (139,285)	40,356 (25,076)	47,333 (29,411)	74,251 (46,137)	0 (0)	0 (0)
—	Jamaica	Jamaica	294,185 (182,798)	272,156 (169,110)	21,090 (13,100)	18,006 (11,188)	0 (0)	22,029 (13,688)	0 (0)
69	Jamaica	Total	294,185 (182,798)	272,156 (169,110)	21,090 (13,100)	18,006 (11,188)	0 (0)	22,029 (13,688)	0 (0)
—	Western Sahara	Western Sahara	284,054 (176,503)	284,054 (176,503)	0 (0)	0 (0)	0 (0)	0 (0)	0 (0)
70	Western Sahara	Total	284,054 (176,503)	284,054 (176,503)	0 (0)	0 (0)	0 (0)	0 (0)	0 (0)
—	Morocco	Morocco	282,857 (175,759)	280,452 (174,265)	33,656 (20,913)	36,310 (22,560)	2,405 (1,494)	0 (0)	0 (0)
71	Morocco	Total	282,857 (175,759)	280,452 (174,265)	33,656 (20,913)	36,310 (22,560)	2,405 (1,494)	0 (0)	0 (0)
—	Uruguay	Uruguay	278,143 (172,830)	184,506 (114,647)	7,352 (4,568)	7,585 (4,713)	16,239 (10,090)	0 (0)	77,398 (48,093)
72	Uruguay	Total	278,143 (172,830)	184,506 (114,647)	7,352 (4,568)	7,585 (4,713)	16,239 (10,090)	0 (0)	77,398 (48,093)
—	Egypt	Egypt	274,985 (170,868)	251,043 (155,991)	35,361 (21,972)	37,932 (23,570)	23,942 (14,877)	0 (0)	0 (0)
73	Egypt	Total	274,985 (170,868)	251,043 (155,991)	35,361 (21,972)	37,932 (23,570)	23,942 (14,877)	0 (0)	0 (0)
—	Turkey	Turkey	262,233 (162,944)	262,233 (162,944)	43,738 (27,178)	80,949 (50,299)	0 (0)	0 (0)	0 (0)
74	Turkey	Total	262,233 (162,944)	262,233 (162,944)	43,738 (27,178)	80,949 (50,299)	0 (0)	0 (0)	0 (0)
—	Ghana	Ghana	248,075 (154,147)	227,500 (141,400)	12,325 (7,658)	12,641 (7,855)	0 (0)	0 (0)	20,575 (12,785)
75	Ghana	Total	248,075 (154,147)	227,500 (141,400)	12,325 (7,658)	12,641 (7,855)	0 (0)	0 (0)	20,575 (12,785)
—	Pakistan	Pakistan	240,401 (149,378)	224,361 (139,411)	15,650 (9,720)	16,055 (9,976)	16,040 (9,970)	0 (0)	0 (0)
76	Pakistan	Total	240,401 (149,378)	224,361 (139,411)	15,650 (9,720)	16,055 (9,976)	16,040 (9,970)	0 (0)	0 (0)
—	Barbados	Barbados	240,157 (149,227)	185,074 (115,000)	6,629 (4,119)	3,546 (2,203)	0 (0)	0 (0)	55,083 (34,227)
77	Barbados	Total	240,157 (149,227)	185,074 (115,000)	6,629 (4,119)	3,546 (2,203)	0 (0)	0 (0)	55,083 (34,227)
—	Iran	Iran	239,795 (149,002)	215,613 (133,976)	32,107 (19,950)	39,153 (24,329)	24,182 (15,026)	0 (0)	0 (0)
78	Iran	Total	239,795 (149,002)	215,613 (133,976)	32,107 (19,950)	39,153 (24,329)	24,182 (15,026)	0 (0)	0 (0)
—	Nicaragua	Nicaragua	235,744 (146,485)	213,813 (132,857)	16,201 (10,067)	18,101 (11,247)	21,931 (13,627)	0 (0)	0 (0)
79	Nicaragua	Total	235,744 (146,485)	213,813 (132,857)	16,201 (10,067)	18,101 (11,247)	21,931 (13,627)	0 (0)	0 (0)
—	Gabon	Gabon	225,302 (139,996)	201,759 (125,367)	15,664 (9,733)	16,638 (10,338)	6,292 (3,910)	0 (0)	17,251 (10,719)
80	Gabon	Total	225,302 (139,996)	201,759 (125,367)	15,664 (9,733)	16,638 (10,338)	6,292 (3,910)	0 (0)	17,251 (10,719)
—	Honduras	Honduras	224,286 (139,365)	210,711 (130,930)	27,312 (16,971)	22,398 (13,917)	13,575 (8,435)	0 (0)	0 (0)
81	Honduras	Total	224,286 (139,365)	210,711 (130,930)	27,312 (16,971)	22,398 (13,917)	13,575 (8,435)	0 (0)	0 (0)
—	Senegal	Senegal	223,345 (138,780)	221,818 (137,831)	10,454 (6,496)	10,575 (6,571)	1,527 (949)	0 (0)	0 (0)
82	Senegal	Total	223,345 (138,780)	221,818 (137,831)	10,454 (6,496)	10,575 (6,571)	1,527 (949)	0 (0)	0 (0)
—	Suriname	Suriname	211,202 (131,235)	133,668 (83,057)	7,937 (4,932)	8,160 (5,070)	820 (510)	0 (0)	76,714 (47,668)
83	Suriname	Total	211,202 (131,235)	133,668 (83,057)	7,937 (4,932)	8,160 (5,070)	820 (510)	0 (0)	76,714 (47,668)
—	Nigeria	Nigeria	187,145 (116,287)	179,048 (111,255)	16,708 (10,382)	20,315 (12,623)	0 (0)	0 (0)	8,097 (5,031)
84	Nigeria	Total	187,145 (116,287)	179,048 (111,255)	16,708 (10,382)	20,315 (12,623)	0 (0)	0 (0)	8,097 (5,031)
—	Ivory Coast	Ivory Coast	186,493 (115,881)	171,760 (106,730)	11,198 (6,958)	12,321 (7,656)	0 (0)	0 (0)	14,733 (9,155)
85	Ivory Coast	Total	186,493 (115,881)	171,760 (106,730)	11,198 (6,958)	12,321 (7,656)	0 (0)	0 (0)	14,733 (9,155)
—	Sweden	Sweden	183,566 (114,063)	155,386 (96,552)	39,846 (24,759)	54,804 (34,054)	28,180 (17,510)	0 (0)	0 (0)
86	Sweden	Total	183,566 (114,063)	155,386 (96,552)	39,846 (24,759)	54,804 (34,054)	28,180 (17,510)	0 (0)	0 (0)
—	Mauritania	Mauritania	180,964 (112,446)	173,180 (107,610)	11,946 (7,423)	12,321 (7,656)	7,784 (4,837)	0 (0)	0 (0)
87	Mauritania	Total	180,964 (112,446)	173,180 (107,610)	11,946 (7,423)	12,321 (7,656)	7,784 (4,837)	0 (0)	0 (0)
—	Comores	Comores	177,095 (110,042)	164,476 (102,201)	12,658 (7,865)	11,072 (6,880)	0 (0)	12,619 (7,841)	0 (0)
88	Comores	Total	177,095 (110,042)	164,476 (102,201)	12,658 (7,865)	11,072 (6,880)	0 (0)	12,619 (7,841)	0 (0)
—	Guyana	Guyana	165,894 (103,082)	138,672 (86,167)	9,359 (5,815)	10,051 (6,245)	0 (0)	0 (0)	27,222 (16,915)
89	Guyana	Total	165,894 (103,082)	138,672 (86,167)	9,359 (5,815)	10,051 (6,245)	0 (0)	0 (0)	27,222 (16,915)
—	Sierra Leone	Sierra Leone	160,584 (99,782)	160,584 (99,782)	8,615 (5,353)	11,116 (6,907)	0 (0)	0 (0)	0 (0)
90	Sierra Leone	Total	160,584 (99,782)	160,584 (99,782)	8,615 (5,353)	11,116 (6,907)	0 (0)	0 (0)	0 (0)
—	Kenya	Kenya	153,608 (95,448)	124,028 (77,067)	8,823 (5,482)	9,539 (5,927)	3,499 (2,174)	0 (0)	26,081 (16,206)
91	Kenya	Total	153,608 (95,448)	124,028 (77,067)	8,823 (5,482)	9,539 (5,927)	3,499 (2,174)	0 (0)	26,081 (16,206)
—	Netherlands	Aruba	30,015 (18,650)	30,015 (18,650)	3,900 (2,400)	2,745 (1,706)	0 (0)	0 (0)	0 (0)
—	Netherlands	Bonaire	13,005 (8,081)	13,005 (8,081)	3,049 (1,895)	3,489 (2,168)	0 (0)	0 (0)	0 (0)
—	Netherlands	Curaçao	25,401 (15,783)	25,401 (15,783)	4,363 (2,711)	4,995 (3,104)	0 (0)	0 (0)	0 (0)
—	Netherlands	Netherlands	69,745 (43,338)	64,292 (39,949)	8,176 (5,080)	8,403 (5,221)	5,453 (3,388)	0 (0)	0 (0)
—	Netherlands	Saba	9,487 (5,895)	9,487 (5,895)	2,009 (1,248)	1,608 (999)	0 (0)	0 (0)	0 (0)
—	Netherlands	Sint-Eustatius	2,176 (1,352)	2,176 (1,352)	451 (280)	1,190 (740)	0 (0)	0 (0)	0 (0)
—	Netherlands	Sint-Maarten	466 (290)	466 (290)	14 (8.7)	452 (281)	0 (0)	0 (0)	0 (0)
92	Netherlands	Total	150,295 (93,389)	144,842 (90,001)	21,962 (13,647)	22,882 (14,218)	5,453 (3,388)	0 (0)	0 (0)
—	Bangladesh	Bangladesh	140,943 (87,578)	112,166 (69,697)	8,102 (5,034)	9,201 (5,717)	19,978 (12,414)	0 (0)	8,799 (5,467)
93	Bangladesh	Total	140,943 (87,578)	112,166 (69,697)	8,102 (5,034)	9,201 (5,717)	19,978 (12,414)	0 (0)	8,799 (5,467)
—	Ukraine	Ukraine	136,198 (84,630)	136,198 (84,630)	0 (0)	0 (0)	0 (0)	0 (0)	0 (0)
94	Ukraine	Total	136,198 (84,630)	136,198 (84,630)	0 (0)	0 (0)	0 (0)	0 (0)	0 (0)
—	Algeria	Algeria	135,992 (84,502)	131,193 (81,520)	23,109 (14,359)	23,488 (14,595)	4,799 (2,982)	0 (0)	0 (0)
95	Algeria	Total	135,992 (84,502)	131,193 (81,520)	23,109 (14,359)	23,488 (14,595)	4,799 (2,982)	0 (0)	0 (0)
—	Sao Tome and Principe	Sao Tome and Principe	134,714 (83,707)	130,844 (81,303)	14,761 (9,172)	11,673 (7,253)	0 (0)	3,870 (2,400)	0 (0)
96	Sao Tome and Principe	Total	134,714 (83,707)	130,844 (81,303)	14,761 (9,172)	11,673 (7,253)	0 (0)	3,870 (2,400)	0 (0)
—	Samoa	Samoa	130,480 (81,080)	130,480 (81,080)	12,204 (7,583)	10,070 (6,260)	0 (0)	0 (0)	0 (0)
97	Samoa	Total	130,480 (81,080)	130,480 (81,080)	12,204 (7,583)	10,070 (6,260)	0 (0)	0 (0)	0 (0)
—	Guinea-Bissau	Guinea-Bissau	120,527 (74,892)	106,870 (66,410)	5,580 (3,470)	6,160 (3,830)	13,657 (8,486)	0 (0)	0 (0)
98	Guinea-Bissau	Total	120,527 (74,892)	106,870 (66,410)	5,580 (3,470)	6,160 (3,830)	13,657 (8,486)	0 (0)	0 (0)
—	Haiti	Haiti	103,485 (64,303)	103,485 (64,303)	18,886 (11,735)	26,202 (16,281)	0 (0)	0 (0)	0 (0)
—	Haiti	Navassa Island	13,890 (8,630)	13,890 (8,630)	0 (0)	0 (0)	0 (0)	0 (0)	0 (0)
99	Haiti	Total	117,375 (72,933)	117,375 (72,933)	18,886 (11,735)	26,202 (16,281)	0 (0)	0 (0)	0 (0)
—	Kazakhstan	Kazakhstan	114,383 (71,074)	114,383 (71,074)	24,994 (15,531)	39,488 (24,537)	0 (0)	0 (0)	0 (0)
100	Kazakhstan	Total	114,383 (71,074)	114,383 (71,074)	24,994 (15,531)	39,488 (24,537)	0 (0)	0 (0)	0 (0)
—	North Korea	North Korea	114,379 (71,072)	114,379 (71,072)	18,054 (11,218)	29,741 (18,480)	0 (0)	0 (0)	0 (0)
101	North Korea	Total	114,379 (71,072)	114,379 (71,072)	18,054 (11,218)	29,741 (18,480)	0 (0)	0 (0)	0 (0)
—	Tunisia	Tunisia	113,297 (70,399)	99,701 (61,951)	19,462 (12,093)	21,370 (13,280)	13,596 (8,448)	0 (0)	0 (0)
102	Tunisia	Total	113,297 (70,399)	99,701 (61,951)	19,462 (12,093)	21,370 (13,280)	13,596 (8,448)	0 (0)	0 (0)
—	Antigua and Barbuda	Antigua and Barbuda	111,568 (69,325)	111,568 (69,325)	6,276 (3,900)	6,612 (4,109)	0 (0)	0 (0)	0 (0)
103	Antigua and Barbuda	Total	111,568 (69,325)	111,568 (69,325)	6,276 (3,900)	6,612 (4,109)	0 (0)	0 (0)	0 (0)
—	Finland	Finland	111,409 (69,226)	81,553 (50,675)	15,278 (9,493)	24,661 (15,324)	29,856 (18,552)	0 (0)	0 (0)
104	Finland	Total	111,409 (69,226)	81,553 (50,675)	15,278 (9,493)	24,661 (15,324)	29,856 (18,552)	0 (0)	0 (0)
—	Guatemala	Guatemala	110,695 (68,783)	110,695 (68,783)	5,698 (3,541)	7,860 (4,880)	0 (0)	0 (0)	0 (0)
105	Guatemala	Total	110,695 (68,783)	110,695 (68,783)	5,698 (3,541)	7,860 (4,880)	0 (0)	0 (0)	0 (0)
—	Guinea	Guinea	102,163 (63,481)	102,163 (63,481)	6,867 (4,267)	9,268 (5,759)	0 (0)	0 (0)	0 (0)
106	Guinea	Total	102,163 (63,481)	102,163 (63,481)	6,867 (4,267)	9,268 (5,759)	0 (0)	0 (0)	0 (0)
—	Cyprus	Cyprus	99,057 (61,551)	98,450 (61,170)	16,134 (10,025)	14,721 (9,147)	607 (377)	0 (0)	0 (0)
107	Cyprus	Total	99,057 (61,551)	98,450 (61,170)	16,134 (10,025)	14,721 (9,147)	607 (377)	0 (0)	0 (0)
—	El Salvador	El Salvador	95,099 (59,092)	95,099 (59,092)	5,891 (3,660)	6,696 (4,161)	0 (0)	0 (0)	0 (0)
108	El Salvador	Total	95,099 (59,092)	95,099 (59,092)	5,891 (3,660)	6,696 (4,161)	0 (0)	0 (0)	0 (0)
—	Trinidad and Tobago	Trinidad and Tobago	83,908 (52,138)	76,562 (47,573)	8,724 (5,421)	9,375 (5,825)	0 (0)	7,154 (4,445)	192 (119)
109	Trinidad and Tobago	Total	83,908 (52,138)	76,562 (47,573)	8,724 (5,421)	9,375 (5,825)	0 (0)	7,154 (4,445)	192 (119)
—	Sudan	Halaib Triangle	19,734 (12,262)	19,734 (12,262)	0 (0)	0 (0)	0 (0)	0 (0)	0 (0)
—	Sudan	Sudan	62,826 (39,038)	62,826 (39,038)	13,047 (8,107)	24,778 (15,396)	0 (0)	0 (0)	0 (0)
110	Sudan	Total	82,560 (51,300)	82,560 (51,300)	13,047 (8,107)	24,778 (15,396)	0 (0)	0 (0)	0 (0)
—	Azerbaijan	Azerbaijan	80,614 (50,091)	80,614 (50,091)	14,388 (8,940)	18,493 (11,491)	0 (0)	0 (0)	0 (0)
111	Azerbaijan	Total	80,614 (50,091)	80,614 (50,091)	14,388 (8,940)	18,493 (11,491)	0 (0)	0 (0)	0 (0)
—	Eritrea	Doumeira Islands	245 (152)	245 (152)	0 (0)	0 (0)	0 (0)	0 (0)	0 (0)
—	Eritrea	Eritrea	79,911 (49,654)	78,110 (48,540)	15,486 (9,623)	41,763 (25,950)	1,801 (1,119)	0 (0)	0 (0)
112	Eritrea	Total	80,156 (49,807)	78,355 (48,688)	15,486 (9,623)	41,763 (25,950)	1,801 (1,119)	0 (0)	0 (0)
—	East Timor	East Timor	75,647 (47,005)	75,647 (47,005)	6,870 (4,270)	13,112 (8,147)	0 (0)	0 (0)	0 (0)
—	East Timor	Oecusse	1,826 (1,135)	1,826 (1,135)	721 (448)	1,105 (687)	0 (0)	0 (0)	0 (0)
113	East Timor	Total	77,473 (48,139)	77,473 (48,139)	7,591 (4,717)	14,217 (8,834)	0 (0)	0 (0)	0 (0)
—	Croatia	Croatia	67,628 (42,022)	55,257 (34,335)	14,317 (8,896)	18,833 (11,702)	12,371 (7,687)	0 (0)	0 (0)
114	Croatia	Total	67,628 (42,022)	55,257 (34,335)	14,317 (8,896)	18,833 (11,702)	12,371 (7,687)	0 (0)	0 (0)
—	United Arab Emirates	Abu musa, Greater and Lesser Tunb	6,173 (3,836)	6,173 (3,836)	0 (0)	0 (0)	0 (0)	0 (0)	0 (0)
—	United Arab Emirates	United Arab Emirates	60,393 (37,526)	51,674 (32,109)	15,604 (9,696)	27,496 (17,085)	8,719 (5,418)	0 (0)	0 (0)
115	United Arab Emirates	Total	66,566 (41,362)	57,847 (35,944)	15,604 (9,696)	27,496 (17,085)	8,719 (5,418)	0 (0)	0 (0)
—	Germany	Germany	65,663 (40,801)	56,831 (35,313)	7,900 (4,900)	16,004 (9,944)	8,832 (5,488)	0 (0)	0 (0)
116	Germany	Total	65,663 (40,801)	56,831 (35,313)	7,900 (4,900)	16,004 (9,944)	8,832 (5,488)	0 (0)	0 (0)
—	Cambodia	Cambodia	62,834 (39,043)	48,697 (30,259)	4,953 (3,078)	5,180 (3,220)	14,137 (8,784)	0 (0)	0 (0)
117	Cambodia	Total	62,834 (39,043)	48,697 (30,259)	4,953 (3,078)	5,180 (3,220)	14,137 (8,784)	0 (0)	0 (0)
—	Turkmenistan	Turkmenistan	61,226 (38,044)	61,226 (38,044)	13,364 (8,304)	17,959 (11,159)	0 (0)	0 (0)	0 (0)
118	Turkmenistan	Total	61,226 (38,044)	61,226 (38,044)	13,364 (8,304)	17,959 (11,159)	0 (0)	0 (0)	0 (0)
—	Malta	Malta	53,114 (33,004)	52,923 (32,885)	6,797 (4,223)	3,838 (2,385)	191 (119)	0 (0)	0 (0)
119	Malta	Total	53,114 (33,004)	52,923 (32,885)	6,797 (4,223)	3,838 (2,385)	191 (119)	0 (0)	0 (0)
—	Estonia	Estonia	49,507 (30,762)	36,451 (22,650)	4,995 (3,104)	13,412 (8,334)	13,056 (8,113)	0 (0)	0 (0)
120	Estonia	Total	49,507 (30,762)	36,451 (22,650)	4,995 (3,104)	13,412 (8,334)	13,056 (8,113)	0 (0)	0 (0)
—	Belize	Belize	45,878 (28,507)	34,312 (21,320)	5,834 (3,625)	6,742 (4,189)	11,566 (7,187)	0 (0)	0 (0)
121	Belize	Total	45,878 (28,507)	34,312 (21,320)	5,834 (3,625)	6,742 (4,189)	11,566 (7,187)	0 (0)	0 (0)
—	Brunei	Brunei	43,038 (26,743)	43,038 (26,743)	2,599 (1,615)	3,133 (1,947)	0 (0)	0 (0)	0 (0)
122	Brunei	Total	43,038 (26,743)	43,038 (26,743)	2,599 (1,615)	3,133 (1,947)	0 (0)	0 (0)	0 (0)
—	Saint Vincent and the Grenadines	Saint Vincent and the Grenadines	37,716 (23,436)	36,244 (22,521)	5,652 (3,512)	5,480 (3,410)	0 (0)	1,472 (915)	0 (0)
123	Saint Vincent and the Grenadines	Total	37,716 (23,436)	36,244 (22,521)	5,652 (3,512)	5,480 (3,410)	0 (0)	1,472 (915)	0 (0)
—	Bulgaria	Bulgaria	35,686 (22,174)	34,745 (21,590)	5,044 (3,134)	5,340 (3,320)	941 (585)	0 (0)	0 (0)
124	Bulgaria	Total	35,686 (22,174)	34,745 (21,590)	5,044 (3,134)	5,340 (3,320)	941 (585)	0 (0)	0 (0)
—	Benin	Benin	35,493 (22,054)	35,493 (22,054)	2,598 (1,614)	2,863 (1,779)	0 (0)	0 (0)	0 (0)
125	Benin	Total	35,493 (22,054)	35,493 (22,054)	2,598 (1,614)	2,863 (1,779)	0 (0)	0 (0)	0 (0)
—	São Tomé and Principe	São Tomé and Principe	34,534 (21,458)	34,534 (21,458)	0 (0)	0 (0)	0 (0)	0 (0)	0 (0)
126	São Tomé and Principe	Total	34,534 (21,458)	34,534 (21,458)	0 (0)	0 (0)	0 (0)	0 (0)	0 (0)
—	Republic of the Congo	Republic of the Congo	33,807 (21,007)	33,807 (21,007)	3,150 (1,960)	3,547 (2,204)	0 (0)	0 (0)	0 (0)
127	Republic of the Congo	Total	33,807 (21,007)	33,807 (21,007)	3,150 (1,960)	3,547 (2,204)	0 (0)	0 (0)	0 (0)
—	Poland	Poland	32,832 (20,401)	30,666 (19,055)	7,798 (4,845)	8,691 (5,400)	2,166 (1,346)	0 (0)	0 (0)
128	Poland	Total	32,832 (20,401)	30,666 (19,055)	7,798 (4,845)	8,691 (5,400)	2,166 (1,346)	0 (0)	0 (0)
—	Qatar	Qatar	31,489 (19,566)	31,489 (19,566)	8,878 (5,517)	9,353 (5,812)	0 (0)	0 (0)	0 (0)
129	Qatar	Total	31,489 (19,566)	31,489 (19,566)	8,878 (5,517)	9,353 (5,812)	0 (0)	0 (0)	0 (0)
—	Romania	Romania	30,379 (18,877)	29,606 (18,396)	4,312 (2,679)	4,597 (2,856)	773 (480)	0 (0)	0 (0)
130	Romania	Total	30,379 (18,877)	29,606 (18,396)	4,312 (2,679)	4,597 (2,856)	773 (480)	0 (0)	0 (0)
—	Latvia	Latvia	29,048 (18,050)	28,322 (17,598)	6,885 (4,278)	10,049 (6,244)	726 (451)	0 (0)	0 (0)
131	Latvia	Total	29,048 (18,050)	28,322 (17,598)	6,885 (4,278)	10,049 (6,244)	726 (451)	0 (0)	0 (0)
—	Dominica	Dominica	28,552 (17,741)	28,552 (17,741)	3,159 (1,963)	3,836 (2,384)	0 (0)	0 (0)	0 (0)
132	Dominica	Total	28,552 (17,741)	28,552 (17,741)	3,159 (1,963)	3,836 (2,384)	0 (0)	0 (0)	0 (0)
—	Grenada	Grenada	26,113 (16,226)	25,571 (15,889)	5,481 (3,406)	4,100 (2,500)	0 (0)	542 (337)	0 (0)
133	Grenada	Total	26,113 (16,226)	25,571 (15,889)	5,481 (3,406)	4,100 (2,500)	0 (0)	542 (337)	0 (0)
—	Israel	Israel	25,955 (16,128)	25,955 (16,128)	4,073 (2,531)	4,127 (2,564)	0 (0)	0 (0)	0 (0)
134	Israel	Total	25,955 (16,128)	25,955 (16,128)	4,073 (2,531)	4,127 (2,564)	0 (0)	0 (0)	0 (0)
—	Gambia	Gambia	23,097 (14,352)	23,097 (14,352)	1,397 (868)	2,421 (1,504)	0 (0)	0 (0)	0 (0)
135	Gambia	Total	23,097 (14,352)	23,097 (14,352)	1,397 (868)	2,421 (1,504)	0 (0)	0 (0)	0 (0)
—	Georgia	Georgia	22,944 (14,257)	22,944 (14,257)	5,154 (3,203)	6,319 (3,926)	0 (0)	0 (0)	0 (0)
136	Georgia	Total	22,944 (14,257)	22,944 (14,257)	5,154 (3,203)	6,319 (3,926)	0 (0)	0 (0)	0 (0)
—	Lebanon	Lebanon	18,857 (11,717)	18,857 (11,717)	4,162 (2,586)	4,649 (2,889)	0 (0)	0 (0)	0 (0)
137	Lebanon	Total	18,857 (11,717)	18,857 (11,717)	4,162 (2,586)	4,649 (2,889)	0 (0)	0 (0)	0 (0)
—	Cameroon	Cameroon	16,460 (10,230)	15,143 (9,409)	4,251 (2,641)	7,216 (4,484)	1,317 (818)	0 (0)	0 (0)
138	Cameroon	Total	16,460 (10,230)	15,143 (9,409)	4,251 (2,641)	7,216 (4,484)	1,317 (818)	0 (0)	0 (0)
—	Togo	Togo	15,447 (9,598)	15,447 (9,598)	1,049 (652)	1,108 (688)	0 (0)	0 (0)	0 (0)
139	Togo	Total	15,447 (9,598)	15,447 (9,598)	1,049 (652)	1,108 (688)	0 (0)	0 (0)	0 (0)
—	Saint Lucia	Saint Lucia	15,413 (9,577)	15,413 (9,577)	3,684 (2,289)	3,818 (2,372)	0 (0)	0 (0)	0 (0)
140	Saint Lucia	Total	15,413 (9,577)	15,413 (9,577)	3,684 (2,289)	3,818 (2,372)	0 (0)	0 (0)	0 (0)
—	Democratic Republic of the Congo	Democratic Republic of the Congo	13,671 (8,495)	13,373 (8,310)	805 (500)	849 (528)	298 (185)	0 (0)	0 (0)
141	Democratic Republic of the Congo	Total	13,671 (8,495)	13,373 (8,310)	805 (500)	849 (528)	298 (185)	0 (0)	0 (0)
—	Kuwait	Kuwait	10,775 (6,695)	10,775 (6,695)	2,054 (1,276)	7,176 (4,459)	0 (0)	0 (0)	0 (0)
142	Kuwait	Total	10,775 (6,695)	10,775 (6,695)	2,054 (1,276)	7,176 (4,459)	0 (0)	0 (0)	0 (0)
—	Syria	Syria	10,269 (6,381)	10,269 (6,381)	3,553 (2,208)	3,905 (2,426)	0 (0)	0 (0)	0 (0)
143	Syria	Total	10,269 (6,381)	10,269 (6,381)	3,553 (2,208)	3,905 (2,426)	0 (0)	0 (0)	0 (0)
—	Saint Kitts and Nevis	Saint Kitts and Nevis	9,502 (5,904)	9,502 (5,904)	2,274 (1,413)	3,157 (1,962)	0 (0)	0 (0)	0 (0)
144	Saint Kitts and Nevis	Total	9,502 (5,904)	9,502 (5,904)	2,274 (1,413)	3,157 (1,962)	0 (0)	0 (0)	0 (0)
—	Djibouti	Djibouti	8,792 (5,463)	7,223 (4,488)	1,550 (960)	3,287 (2,042)	1,569 (975)	0 (0)	0 (0)
145	Djibouti	Total	8,792 (5,463)	7,223 (4,488)	1,550 (960)	3,287 (2,042)	1,569 (975)	0 (0)	0 (0)
—	Bahrain	Bahrain	7,516 (4,670)	7,516 (4,670)	1,235 (767)	5,034 (3,128)	0 (0)	0 (0)	0 (0)
146	Bahrain	Total	7,516 (4,670)	7,516 (4,670)	1,235 (767)	5,034 (3,128)	0 (0)	0 (0)	0 (0)
—	Lithuania	Lithuania	7,302 (4,537)	6,864 (4,265)	1,523 (946)	1,828 (1,136)	438 (272)	0 (0)	0 (0)
147	Lithuania	Total	7,302 (4,537)	6,864 (4,265)	1,523 (946)	1,828 (1,136)	438 (272)	0 (0)	0 (0)
—	Montenegro	Montenegro	6,383 (3,966)	6,383 (3,966)	1,732 (1,076)	2,258 (1,403)	0 (0)	0 (0)	0 (0)
148	Montenegro	Total	6,383 (3,966)	6,383 (3,966)	1,732 (1,076)	2,258 (1,403)	0 (0)	0 (0)	0 (0)
—	Belgium	Belgium	3,567 (2,216)	3,531 (2,194)	1,156 (718)	1,431 (889)	36 (22)	0 (0)	0 (0)
149	Belgium	Total	3,567 (2,216)	3,531 (2,194)	1,156 (718)	1,431 (889)	36 (22)	0 (0)	0 (0)
—	Iraq	Iraq	1,606 (998)	1,370 (850)	295 (183)	809 (503)	236 (147)	0 (0)	0 (0)
150	Iraq	Total	1,606 (998)	1,370 (850)	295 (183)	809 (503)	236 (147)	0 (0)	0 (0)
—	Palestine	Palestine	1,120 (700)	1,120 (700)	399 (248)	721 (448)	0 (0)	0 (0)	0 (0)
151	Palestine	Total	1,120 (700)	1,120 (700)	399 (248)	721 (448)	0 (0)	0 (0)	0 (0)
—	Singapore	Singapore	675 (419)	675 (419)	0 (0)	675 (419)	0 (0)	0 (0)	0 (0)
152	Singapore	Total	675 (419)	675 (419)	0 (0)	675 (419)	0 (0)	0 (0)	0 (0)
—	Monaco	Monaco	288 (179)	288 (179)	71 (44)	74 (46)	0 (0)	0 (0)	0 (0)
153	Monaco	Total	288 (179)	288 (179)	71 (44)	74 (46)	0 (0)	0 (0)	0 (0)
—	Slovenia	Slovenia	246 (153)	214 (133)	0 (0)	182 (113)	32 (20)	0 (0)	0 (0)
154	Slovenia	Total	246 (153)	214 (133)	0 (0)	182 (113)	32 (20)	0 (0)	0 (0)
—	Jordan	Jordan	97 (60)	97 (60)	0 (0)	97 (60)	0 (0)	0 (0)	0 (0)
155	Jordan	Total	97 (60)	97 (60)	0 (0)	97 (60)	0 (0)	0 (0)	0 (0)
—	Bosnia and Herzegovina	Bosnia and Herzegovina	13 (8.1)	13 (8.1)	0 (0)	13 (8.1)	0 (0)	0 (0)	0 (0)
156	Bosnia and Herzegovina	Total	13 (8.1)	13 (8.1)	0 (0)	13 (8.1)	0 (0)	0 (0)	0 (0)
—	Albania	Albania	0 (0)	0 (0)	0 (0)	0 (0)	0 (0)	0 (0)	0 (0)
157	Albania	Total	0 (0)	0 (0)	0 (0)	0 (0)	0 (0)	0 (0)	0 (0)
—	The Ocean	High Seas	222,496,418 (138,252,865)	0 (0)	0 (0)	0 (0)	0 (0)	0 (0)	0 (0)
0	Claimed Maritime Areas	Grand Total	179,691,511 (111,655,128)	140,763,739 (87,466,532)	8,742,527 (5,432,354)	8,990,880 (5,586,670)	6,242,355 (3,878,820)	5,360,451 (3,330,830)	27,324,966 (16,978,947)

== See also ==
- Air defense identification zone
- Baseline
- Continental shelf
- International waters
- R v Marshall
- Special economic zone
- Territorial waters
- Open Balkan
- Craiovia Group
- CEFTA
