= Shoulder strap =

Shoulder strap may refer to:

- A shoulder strap on a uniform; a section of cloth extending from the end of the shoulder towards the collar and which may display rank insignia
- A feature of certain types of shirts or other clothing
  - Spaghetti strap, a thin shoulder strap
- A part of certain types of baggage or luggage, such as a backpack
- Shoulder harness, part of a seatbelt
- Guitar strap

== See also ==
- Shoulder (disambiguation)
- Strap (disambiguation)
