= GSCP =

GSCP may refer to:

- Government Security Classifications Policy
- Gödel's Scaffolded Cognitive Prompting (GSCP)
