= Strap (disambiguation) =

A strap is a ribbon used to fasten.

Strap or STRAP may also refer to:

- Shoulder strap (disambiguation), several uses
- Currency strap, straps used to bundle banknotes
- Aerial straps, a type of aerial apparatus on which various feats of strength and flexibility may be performed
- Lower third, the graphics at the bottom of telecasts, in the UK known as a strap or namestrap
- Strap, a colloquial word for a handgun
- The Strap, punishment. Usually a long band or strip of leather.
- The Straps, the band
- STRAP, human enzyme
- STRETCH Assembly Program (STRAP), an assembler for IBM 7030 Stretch
- STRAP Clearance, a form of security vetting in the United Kingdom
- Strap (options), an option trading strategy in finance
- Strapping option, a hardware configuration setting usually sensed during power-up/bootstrapping

== See also ==
- Strapping, a flexible flat material used to fasten objects
- Cable tie
