= Relationship of Peter Mandelson and Jeffrey Epstein =

British political scandal

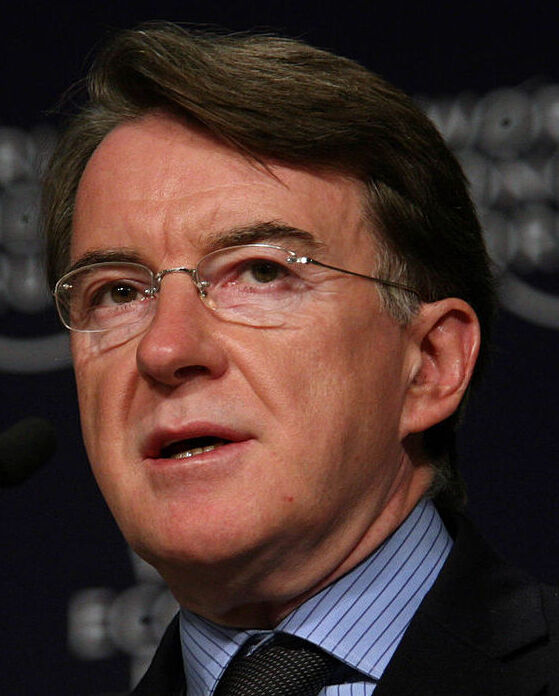
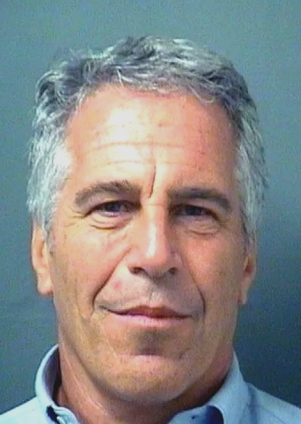
Peter Mandelson (left) maintained a close friendship with Jeffrey Epstein (right) before and after Epstein's 2008 conviction.

The relationship between British politician Peter Mandelson and the American child sex offender Jeffrey Epstein spanned from at least 2002 to 2011, continuing after Epstein's first conviction in 2008. Their friendship had been public knowledge, but a fresh wave of scrutiny and public outrage erupted in September 2025 following the release of US court documents and a cache of private emails between the two men by the US House Oversight Committee. The backlash created a political scandal in the United Kingdom with significant ramifications for the governing British Labour Party and prime minister Keir Starmer, who soon dismissed Mandelson as the British Ambassador to the United States and oversaw his resignation from the Labour Party and from the House of Lords.

The Epstein files revealed the depth and nature of their relationship. Mandelson called Epstein his "best pal" in a 2003 birthday book message; had reportedly expressed support for Epstein following his 2008 conviction in Florida for soliciting prostitution from a minor; allegedly told Epstein he "thought the world of him" and advised him to "fight for early release" from his 18-month sentence; reportedly had his travel paid for by Epstein in 2003; received payments from Epstein alongside his husband; and alleged that, in 2009–10, he passed on confidential government information to Epstein amid the 2008 financial crisis while Mandelson was serving as business secretary in the Gordon Brown ministry.

Starmer and the then-foreign secretary David Lammy announced Mandelson's appointment as British Ambassador to the United States in December 2024 to strengthen the government's relationship with incoming US president Donald Trump. In September 2025, amid the first releases of the Epstein files, the British government claimed that newly published emails provided "materially different" information about the extent of the Mandelson–Epstein relationship, and dismissed Mandelson as ambassador. In February 2026, Starmer told the House of Commons that Mandelson "betrayed our country, our Parliament, and my party. He lied repeatedly" and that he regretted appointing him.

The scandal brought down several other government figures, including Starmer's Chief of Staff Morgan McSweeney who took responsibility for Mandelson's appointment, and Olly Robbins, a top civil servant in the Foreign Office. Several people have called on Starmer to resign as a result of the scandal, including Leader of the Opposition Kemi Badenoch who called the prime minister's position "untenable", Ed Davey (Liberal Democrats leader), Nigel Farage (Reform UK leader), Zack Polanski (Green Party leader), Liz Saville Roberts (Plaid Cymru parliamentary leader), and John Swinney (First Minister of Scotland and SNP leader).

Mandelson was stripped of honorary awards and titles, and for his part expressed deep regret for the association, claiming he was "taken in" by a "charismatic criminal liar", and profoundly sympathised with Epstein's victims. Mandelson resigned from the Labour Party and from the House of Lords, and the Metropolitan Police launched a criminal investigation into alleged misconduct in a public office. On 23 February 2026, Mandelson was arrested on suspicion of misconduct in public office, and then released on bail pending further investigation.

In April 2026, it was reported that Mandelson had been denied security clearance by security vetting back in January 2025. A government spokesperson said "the decision to grant developed vetting to Peter Mandelson against the recommendation of UK Security Vetting was taken by officials in the FCDO". Starmer said he was not told that he had failed security vetting, and denied claims that he had misled the House of Commons. Foreign Secretary Yvette Cooper dismissed the most senior civil servant in the Foreign Office Olly Robbins, who said he had been put under "serious pressure" to push through the appointment at a summons to the Foreign Affairs Select Committee.

== Background ==
=== 2002–2011 ===
Mandelson was a friend of Jeffrey Epstein, an American financier who pleaded guilty to soliciting prostitution from someone under the age of 18 in 2008, and was arrested again on federal charges for the sex trafficking of minors in 2019, later dying in custody. They were friends while Mandelson was serving as a cabinet minister under Labour prime ministers Tony Blair and Gordon Brown. The friendship lasted at least from 2002 to 2011, continuing even after Epstein's first conviction in 2008. Amid the wider "Epstein scandal" in 2019, UK's Channel 4 aired an episode of Dispatches in which a source close to Epstein said that Mandelson, while serving as a cabinet minister, made a phone call to Epstein in order to set up a meeting with Jamie Dimon, CEO of JPMorgan. In June 2023, an internal JPMorgan report from 2019, filed with a New York court, found that "Jeffrey Epstein appears to maintain a particularly close relationship with Prince Andrew the Duke of York (Note: Following the removal of his titles in 2025, the former Prince Andrew became known as Andrew Mountbatten-Windsor. He faced major backlash in late 2019 due to his own association with Epstein and the related allegations of sexual abuse against him by Virginia Guiffre.) and Lord Peter Mandelson, a senior member of the British government." In 2024, a picture of Mandelson with Epstein on his private island Little Saint James resurfaced in court documents. In September 2025 it emerged that an internal report by JPMorgan suggested that, in 2009, Mandelson stayed at Epstein's Manhattan apartment while Epstein was serving his 18-month prison sentence for soliciting prostitution.

According to reports in September 2025, Mandelson flew on Epstein's private jet, the Lolita Express, on at least one occasion. A former Epstein employee, Valdson Vieira Cotrin, recalls Mandelson flying with Epstein on his private jet. The trip, in the early 2000s, was from St. Thomas in the US Virgin Islands to New York. A former employee believes Epstein made a short helicopter trip to meet Mandelson while he was staying on a nearby island.

Additionally, Epstein paid for commercial flights for Mandelson. Financial records from the US House of Representatives Oversight Committee show that Epstein paid for two commercial flights for Mandelson in April 2003, totalling more than $7,400 (£5,400). Emails from October 2005 show that, after Mandelson complained to Epstein about a lack of British Airways air miles, Epstein offered to pay for his plane tickets to the Caribbean. It is unknown if Mandelson accepted the offer. It also emerged that in 2002, Mandelson encouraged Prime Minister Tony Blair to meet Epstein, and that during his time as business secretary, Mandelson reportedly asked Epstein to broker a deal for the sale of a UK taxpayer-owned banking business. Documents concerning Mandelson's 2002 memo and advice to Blair on Epstein were set to be released from the National Archives in September 2025 but were withheld due to an "international relations" exemption.

==== Payments from Epstein ====
In January 2026, a release of documents relating to Epstein showed Mandelson and his boyfriend (since October 2023 husband) Reinaldo Avila da Silva received upwards of $75,000 in three payments from Epstein, the first of such payments having been made to Mandelson in 2003 and the last in 2004.

According to the documents, Avila da Silva was sent thousands of pounds between 2009 and 2010 as Epstein put the Cabinet minister's boyfriend on a monthly stipend of $4,000 (£2,950), sent directly to his personal bank account.

==== Support of Epstein ====
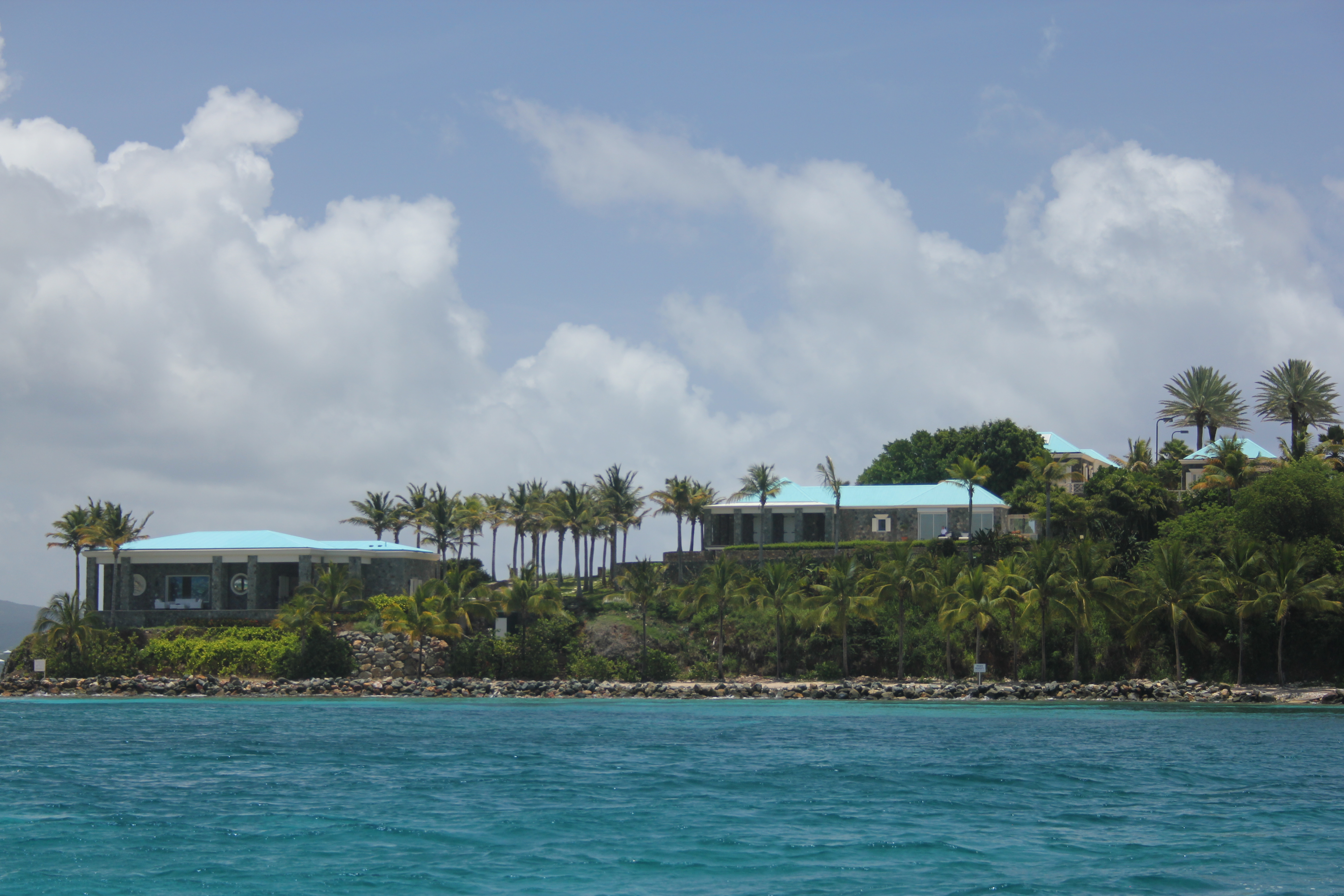
Mandelson spent nearly a week on Epstein's private Caribbean island, Little Saint James, in 2003.

On 9 September 2025, the US House Oversight Committee published a series of documents from Epstein's estate, which included a letter written by Mandelson to Epstein in 2003. The letter was part of a birthday book compiled by Ghislaine Maxwell, for Epstein's 50th birthday in 2003. Within that letter, Mandelson described Epstein as an "intelligent sharp-witted man" and as "my best pal". A number of pictures of Mandelson, including one with Epstein, were published alongside the letter. Alongside one picture of Mandelson with two women, whose faces are obscured, he writes about meeting Epstein's interesting – in inverted commas – friends.

On 10 September 2025, further communication from Mandelson to Epstein was published widely, including an email sent in June 2008 after Epstein's conviction for soliciting prostitution from someone aged under 18 and before his sentencing, where he wrote:

"You have to be incredibly resilient, fight for early release and be philosophical about it as much as you can. The whole thing has been years of torture and now you have to show the world how big a person you are, and how strong. I think the world of you and I feel hopeless and furious about what has happened. I can still barely understand it. It just could not happen in Britain. Everything can be turned into an opportunity and that you will come through it and be stronger for it. Your friends stay with you and love you."

When asked about the email, Mandelson responded: "I relied on assurances of his innocence that turned out later to be horrendously false."

==== Alleged government leaks to Epstein ====
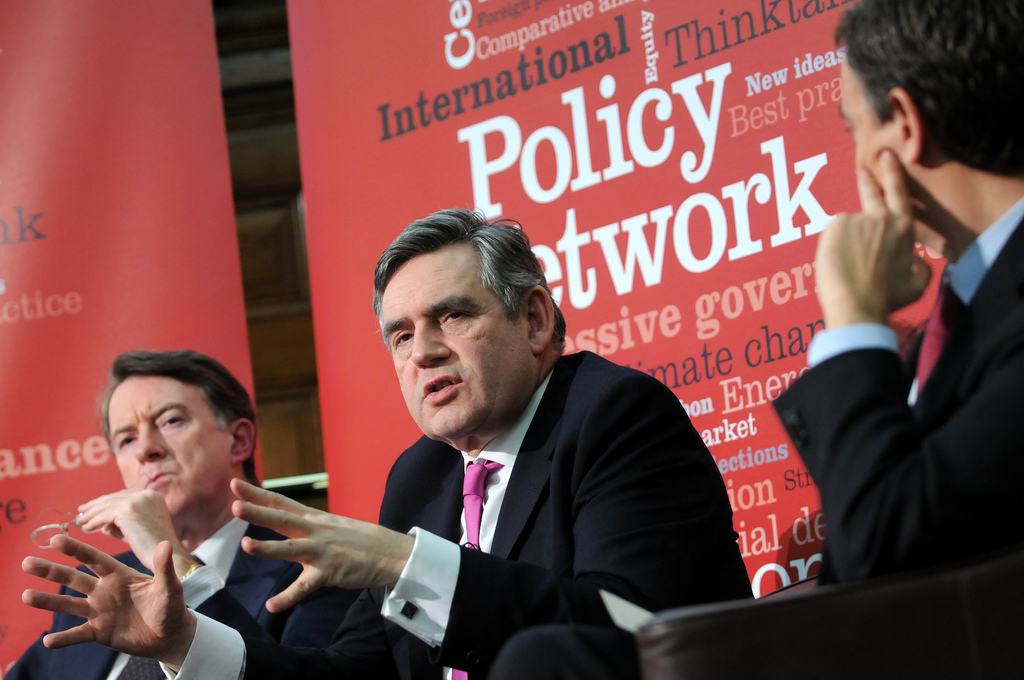
Mandelson (left) with then British prime minister Gordon Brown in 2010, amid his alleged government leaks to Epstein

On 13 June 2009, Mandelson allegedly leaked to Epstein a high-level Downing Street document that proposed £20bn of asset sales and revealed Labour's tax policy plans. The memo was written on 13 June 2009 by Nick Butler, who was a special adviser to Prime Minister Gordon Brown from 2009 to 2010. A December 2009 email from Mandelson appeared to suggest that JPMorgan Chase boss Jamie Dimon should "mildly threaten" Chancellor of the Exchequer Alistair Darling over a bankers' bonus tax; the pressure was reportedly exerted through references to the role of US banks as buyers of UK gilts, as well as investment plans in London.

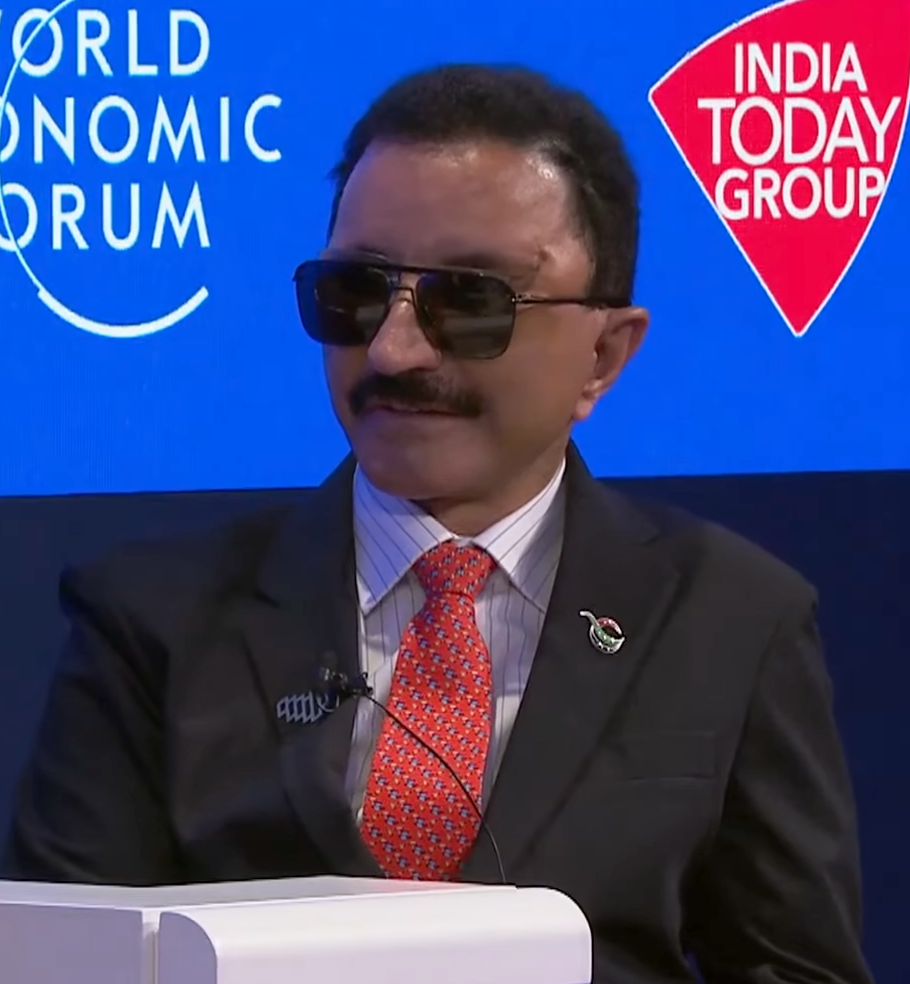
Epstein acted as a middleman, helping Dubai's DP World CEO Sultan Ahmed bin Sulayem lobby Mandelson—who had become the UK Business Secretary—for government support of the London Gateway port project.

On 31 March 2010, Mandelson allegedly forwarded confidential minutes of a meeting between Chancellor of the Exchequer Alistair Darling and the director of the US National Economic Council, Larry Summers, five minutes after he received them, which discussed new banking regulation and taxation that Summers wanted to see, in addition to discussion on how the US should engage with France and Germany. The following day, 1 April 2010, Mandelson met with Larry Summers, and forwarded the minutes of his meeting two minutes after he received them.

On 9 May 2010, Mandelson gave Epstein advance notice of a €500bn bailout from the EU to save the euro. On 10 May 2010, Mandelson emailed Epstein saying "finally got him to go today", with Brown resigning the following day. In another email on 10 May 2010, Mandelson appeared to reveal to Epstein the existence of a secret underground tunnel between 10 Downing Street and the Ministry of Defence.

On 3 February 2026, London's Metropolitan Police announced that they would formally launch a criminal investigation into Mandelson. It was also reported that Mandelson had lobbied the Barack Obama administration in March 2010, to water down proposed restrictions on US bank trading activities, on behalf of Epstein and Jes Staley.

==== Concerns to Starmer ====
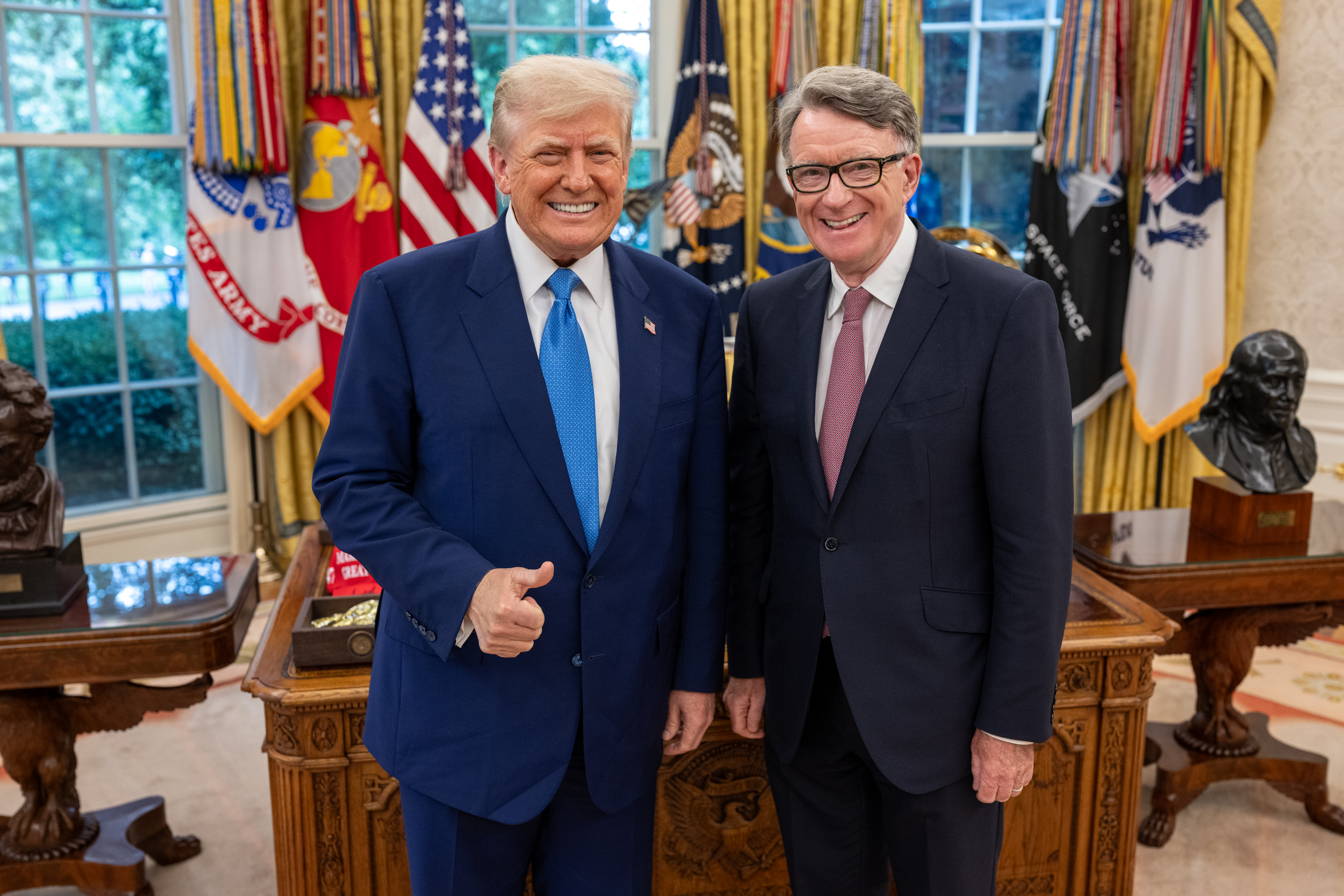
US President Donald Trump and Mandelson (pictured) met a number of times in 2025. Trump said in September 2025 that he did not know him.

Mandelson was nominated as HM Ambassador to the United States by Starmer in December 2024, primarily to provide a "political heavyweight" presence capable of navigating a second Donald Trump administration and to manage potential trade tariffs and economic friction. His existing high-level connections to figures like Elon Musk and Scott Bessent were viewed at the time as vital assets for building influence within the new administration's inner circle. In February 2025, Starmer jokingly compared Mandelson to Trump: "He’s a true one-off, a pioneer in business, in politics. Many people love him. Others love to hate him. But to us, he's just... Peter." Following Mandelson's appointment, the security services allegedly shared concerns with Starmer but he was nevertheless appointed. The Cabinet Office carried out a due diligence check on Mandelson, but the appointment was announced before an in-depth security vetting was conducted.

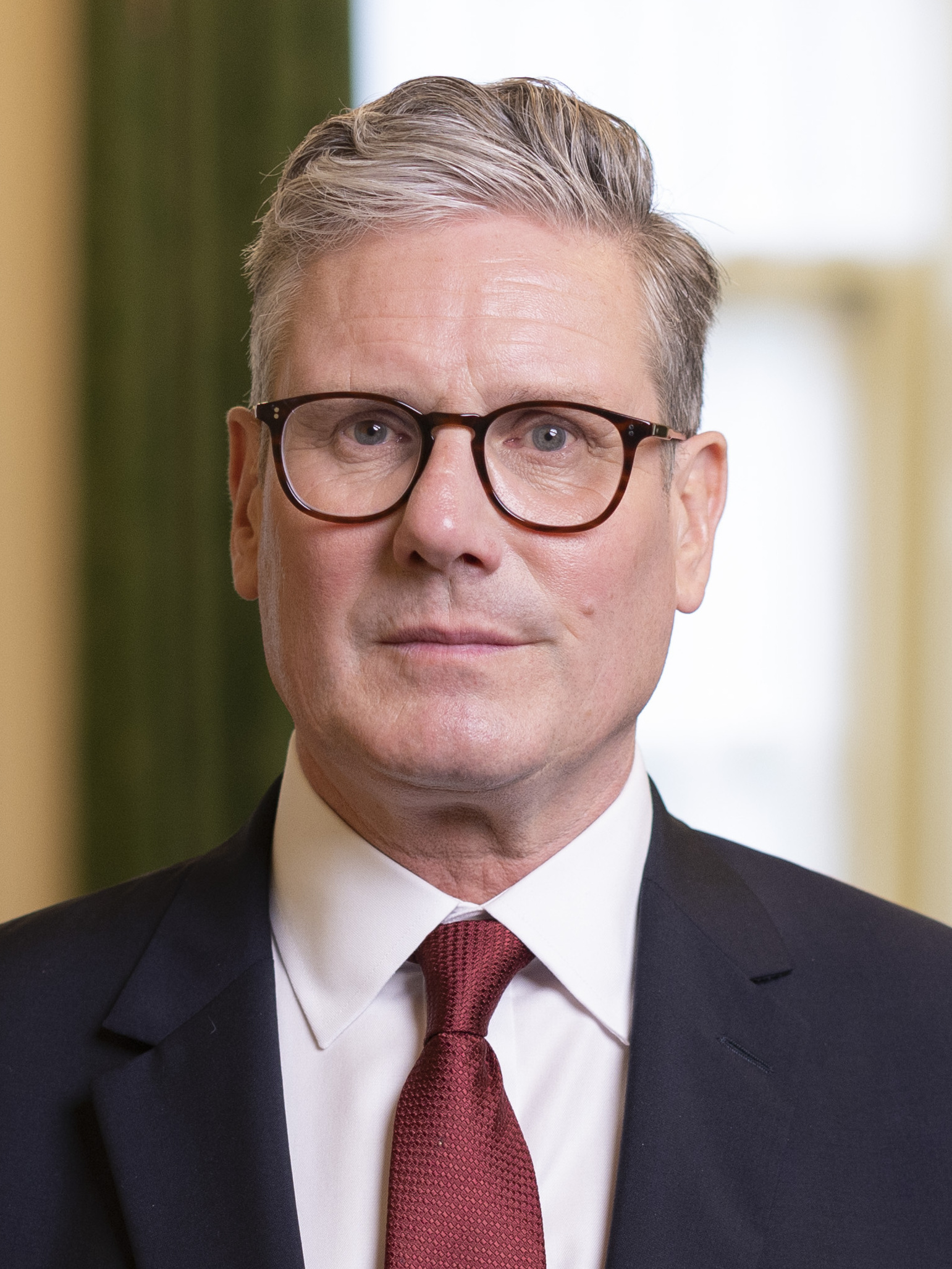
The security services allegedly shared concerns with Starmer but Mandelson was nevertheless appointed.

It was later revealed that Starmer explicitly asked Mandelson three specific questions regarding his links to Epstein before deciding to appoint him. These questions were: "Why has he continued contact with Epstein after he was convicted, why was he reported to have stayed in one of Epstein's homes while the financier was in prison, and why was he associated with a charity founded by Epstein associate Ghislaine Maxwell that the financier had backed". Subsequently, the consultancy Global Counsel effectively disassociated itself from its co-founder by planning the sale of Mandelson's multimillion-pound stake over the following few months.

It was also reported that Morgan McSweeney, Starmer's chief of staff at the time, who was known to be personally close to Mandelson, had been a "keen advocate" for Mandelson's appointment as ambassador despite his involvement with Epstein already being known, and despite concerns raised by the security services during the vetting process. It was further reported that McSweeney had urged government colleagues to defend Mandelson in the days before his eventual dismissal. Stephen Bush wrote in the Financial Times that this decision "raises questions" about Starmer and McSweeney's political judgement. Some Labour MPs were reportedly angry at McSweeney's influence, accusing him of promoting a factional, clique-driven style of politics, especially as allies of Starmer and McSweeney had been recently promoted during a cabinet reshuffle in September 2025.

In February 2026, Starmer defended McSweeney, stating: "Morgan McSweeney is an essential part of my team. He helped me change the Labour party and win an election. Of course I have confidence in him.

== Mandelson's response ==
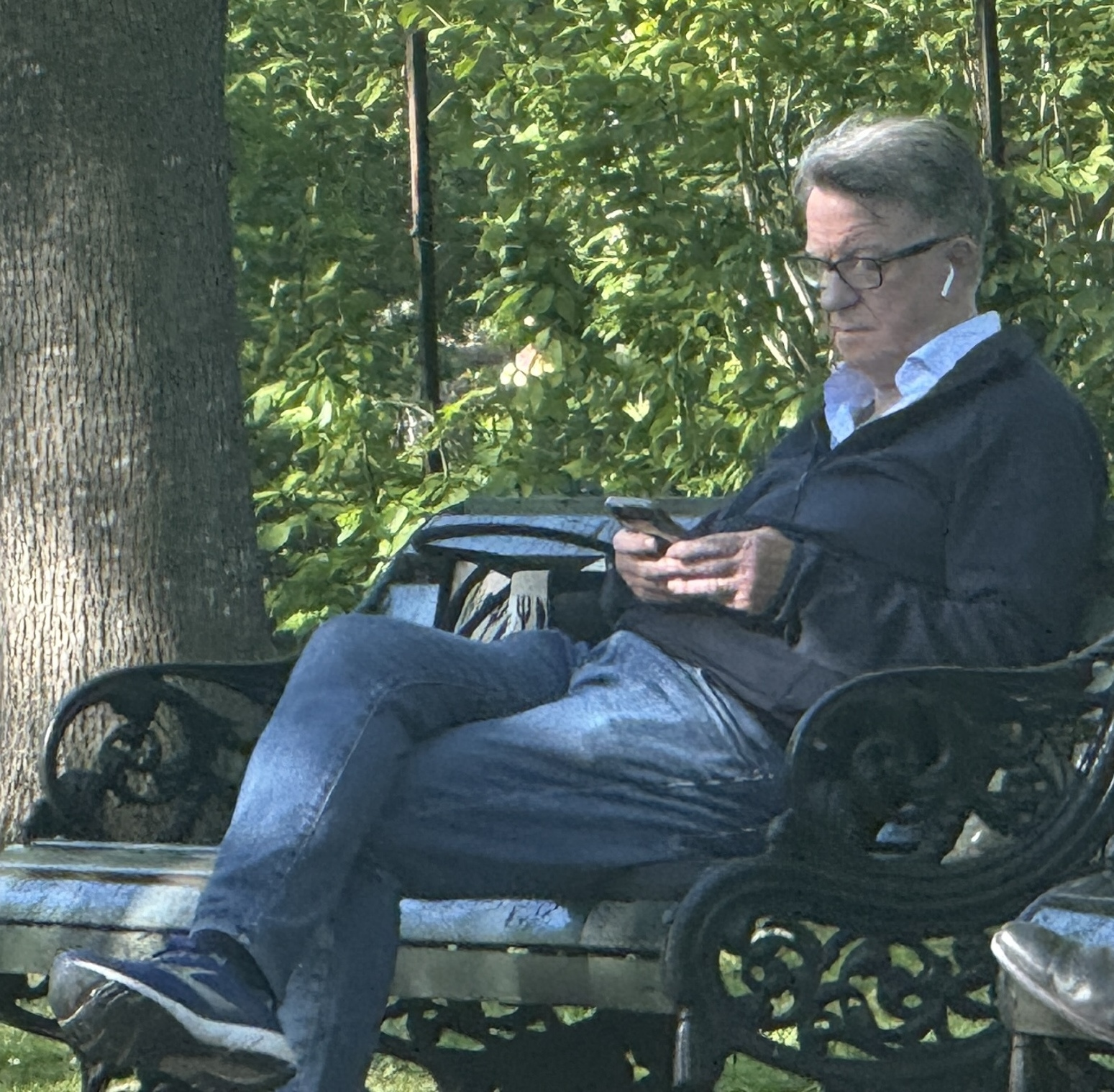
Mandelson seen in Regent's Park, London, in the midst of the scandal, April 2026.

In February 2025, when asked about his relationship with Epstein by the Financial Times, Mandelson said: "I regret ever meeting him or being introduced to him by his partner Ghislaine Maxwell. I regret even more the hurt he caused to many young women. I'm not going to go into this. It's an FT obsession and frankly you can all fuck off. OK?". His remark sparked significant criticism regarding his suitability for a high-profile diplomatic role.

In a September 2025 interview with journalist Harry Cole for the YouTube show Harry Cole Saves the West, Mandelson discussed his relationship with Epstein. His comments came after the release of US documents detailing his interactions with Epstein, including a 2003 message where Mandelson called Epstein his "best pal". During the interview, Mandelson said he deeply regrets continuing his association with Epstein for "far longer than I should have done" and that the association has felt like "an albatross around my neck" since Epstein's death. He stated that he was "taken in" and "fell for his lies," believing Epstein's assurances about his 2008 conviction for soliciting prostitution from an underage person, but now recognised Epstein as a "charismatic criminal liar". He expressed "profound sympathy" for Epstein's victims and claimed that during his association with Epstein, he never saw any evidence of criminal activity. Mandelson suggested that as a gay man, he "never sought and nor did [Epstein] offer any introductions to women in the way that allegedly he did for others". He acknowledged that more "very embarrassing" correspondence with Epstein would likely come to light, adding, "I can't rewrite history".

On 10 September, Mandelson spoke to The Sun, where he first addressed the resurfaced links to Epstein. He called Epstein a "charismatic criminal liar" and said he felt "very, very deep regret" for continuing their association for "far longer than I should have done". He acknowledged that more "embarrassing" correspondence would likely be revealed. He said he "fell for and accepted assurances" from Epstein regarding his criminal case in Florida and was unaware of any criminal activity. Following his dismissal as ambassador to the United States on 11 September 2025, Mandelson issued a letter to British Embassy staff. He stated that serving as ambassador was "the privilege of my life" and expressed deep regret over the circumstances surrounding his departure and his "association with Epstein twenty years ago and the plight of his victims". He accepted Starmer's decision, saying he had "no alternative". The Foreign Office cited emails in which Mandelson appeared to question Epstein's 2008 conviction as the "new information" prompting the dismissal. The BBC reported that Mandelson disputes the interpretation that he thought the conviction was "wrongful," instead believing the length of the sentence should be challenged. He maintains that he was truthful during the vetting process, but No. 10 sources said he was "economical with the truth".

=== Arrest ===
On 23 February 2026, days after fellow Epstein associate Andrew Mountbatten-Windsor was arrested on suspicion of misconduct in public office, Mandelson was also arrested on suspicion of misconduct in public office. Both men were arrested on suspicion of using their government positions to leak sensitive information to Epstein; Mandelson being accused of leaking Downing Street emails to Epstein while he was Business Secretary. He was taken to a London police station for questioning. At 2 am on 24 February 2026, Mandelson was released on bail.

== Starmer's response ==
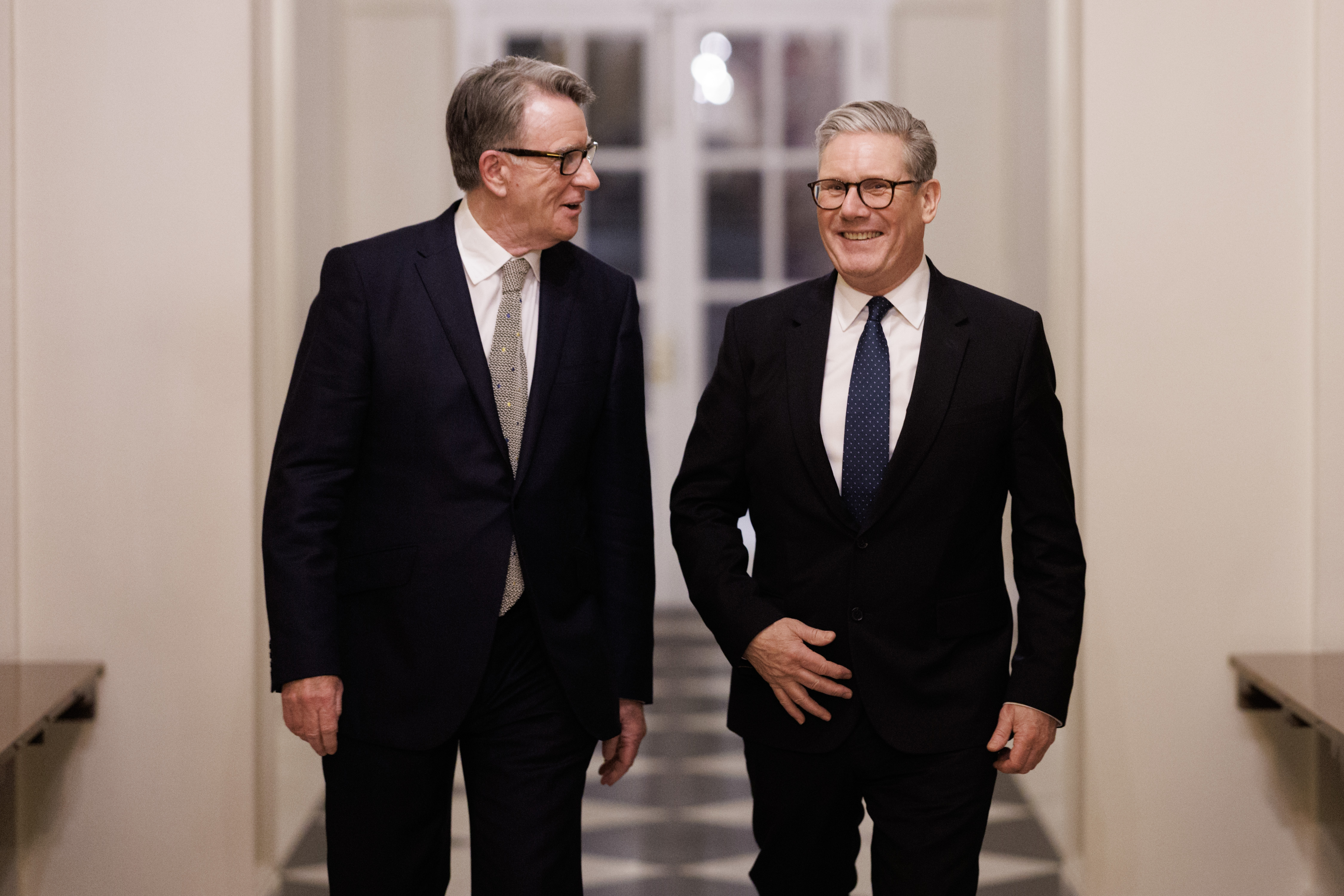
Starmer has faced significant political pressure regarding the scandal, which led to the resignation of his chief of staff Morgan McSweeney.

Starmer has faced significant political pressure regarding the scandal, particularly concerning his initial appointment and later dismissal of Mandelson as ambassador to the US. Starmer's response has included publicly expressing anger, stating that he would not have made the appointment had he known the full extent of Mandelson's ties to Epstein, and acknowledging flaws in the vetting process. On Wednesday, 10 September 2025, during Prime Minister's Questions, Starmer publicly defended Mandelson amid repeated calls for him to resign as ambassador. Starmer dismissed Mandelson the next day, 11 September, after emails emerged showing Mandelson encouraged Epstein to "fight for early release" from jail in 2008. Starmer described Mandelson's comments as "reprehensible". Following usual HR procedure, as he was dismissed Mandelson received a payoff from the Foreign Office of £75,000.

Downing Street sources stated that the newly published emails revealed a relationship with Epstein that was "materially different" from what was known at the time of the appointment. Starmer said he was not "at all" satisfied with Mandelson's responses to questions from government officials. Starmer claimed that while he knew at PMQs that the Foreign Office was investigating the emails, he was not made aware of their full content until later that evening, after PMQs. He told Channel 4 News he was "angry to have been put in that position". Some reports suggested Starmer was deliberately kept in the dark by his team. While the Foreign Office later acknowledged that Mandelson was not given in-depth vetting before the appointment, a full review of vetting processes has been avoided, leading to further questions from the Opposition. Critics, including Leader of the Opposition and Conservative leader Kemi Badenoch and Leader of the Liberal Democrats Ed Davey, have accused Starmer of poor judgement, dishonesty, and hiding from scrutiny.

A source close to Starmer revealed that the prime minister is "frustrated and a bit angry" at the scandal, because "he is having to deal with the conduct of others, rather than show what he is trying to do". The scandal has been described as particularly damaging for the Starmer ministry, starting days after the tax scandal surrounding former Deputy Prime Minister Angela Rayner. It has also been described as damaging for the UK's negotiations with Trump, due to Trump's own relationship with Epstein which has also been the source of major controversy. In his first interview since Mandelson was dismissed, Starmer said: "I don't particularly think anger helps here, but I feel let down. I feel that the process was gone through and now information has come to light which had I known it at the time, I wouldn't have appointed him." Starmer began facing leadership questions amid the scandal, with many Labour MPs expressing public and private frustration with the prime minister's leadership. MPs reportedly viewed underperformance in the May 2026 United Kingdom local elections, 2026 Scottish Parliament election and 2026 Senedd election as a likely catalyst for a leadership challenge.

Mandelson was dismissed by Starmer on 11 September 2025 following the publication in The Sun newspaper of supportive emails Mandelson sent to Epstein after he was arrested in 2008. The emails show that Mandelson stated Epstein's first conviction was wrongful and tried to help Epstein to challenge the verdict. Foreign Office minister Stephen Doughty said these emails showed "the depth and extent of Peter Mandelson's relationship with Jeffrey Epstein is materially different from that known at the time of his appointment. In light of that, and mindful of the victims of Epstein's appalling crimes, he has been withdrawn as ambassador with immediate effect." In his letter to US embassy staff after being dismissed, Mandelson said: "The circumstances surrounding the announcement today are ones which I deeply regret. I continue to feel utterly awful about my association with Epstein twenty years ago and the plight of his victims. I have no alternative to accepting the Prime Minister's decision and will leave a position in which I have been so incredibly honoured to serve." James Roscoe was appointed interim ambassador following Mandelson's dismissal, and Christian Turner was appointed ambassador in February 2026.

In a February 2026 statement at Prime Minister's Questions following subsequent revelations about Mandelson in the Epstein files, Starmer addressed the fallout from revealed links between Mandelson and Epstein, focusing on accountability and the protection of public standards. He began by expressing solidarity with Epstein's victims and those affected by the 2008 financial crash, acknowledging their trauma and anger. Starmer accused Mandelson of repeatedly lying to his team during the vetting process for his appointment as US ambassador, specifically misrepresenting the nature of his relationship with Epstein. He characterised Mandelson's alleged actions—including leaking sensitive information during the 2008 financial crisis—as a betrayal of the country, Parliament, and the Labour Party. Regarding legal consequences, Starmer confirmed that material had been referred to the police, resulting in an active criminal investigation into potential misconduct. He also announced plans to draft legislation to strip Mandelson of his title and to establish broader powers for removing disgraced peers from the House of Lords. Finally, he stated he reached an agreement with King Charles III to remove Mandelson from the Privy Council for bringing the body into disrepute. Starmer explicitly expressed regret for the appointment, stating that Mandelson would never have been considered for the role had the full extent of his ties to Epstein been known at the time.

=== Resignation of Morgan McSweeney ===
On 8 February 2026, following increasing internal pressures, McSweeney resigned as Starmer's chief of staff. In a written statement, McSweeney took responsibility for the decision to appoint Mandelson, acknowledging it was wrong and had damaged the party and trust in politics. He stated that stepping aside was "the only honourable course". McSweeney expressed pride in the government's achievements, stating that his motivation was always to support a Labour government focused on ordinary people. He also highlighted the importance of remembering the victims of Epstein. Although he did not oversee vetting, he called for it to be fundamentally overhauled. He concluded by affirming his support for Starmer's mission.

Starmer accepted McSweeney's resignation and issued a statement expressing gratitude for his service. Starmer stated that he and the Labour Party owe McSweeney a "debt of gratitude" for his years of service. He credited McSweeney with a central role in the party's electoral success, including the 2024 landslide majority. Starmer praised McSweeney's "dedication, loyalty and leadership" and said it had been an honour to work with him. Following McSweeney's resignation, major news outlets such as BBC and The Guardian described the move as a significant political shake-up, highlighting increased scrutiny of Downing Street's vetting procedures. The resignation also prompted discussions within the Labour Party about improving internal oversight and accountability. The resignation also led to Tim Allan resigning as Director of Communications the following day.

In October 2025, McSweeney, who was then the Downing Street Chief of Staff, reported his government-issued phone as stolen by a cyclist in Westminster. The incident gained significant attention in March 2026 following a parliamentary order for the government to release communications between McSweeney and Mandelson regarding the latter’s appointment as US ambassador. Critics, including Conservative opposition leader Kemi Badenoch, have raised concerns about the timing of the theft, while Prime Minister Keir Starmer has dismissed suggestions of a "cover-up" as "far-fetched". To provide transparency, the Metropolitan Police released a transcript of McSweeney’s 999 call, which revealed he initially provided an incorrect street name, leading to the case being recorded in the wrong location and subsequently closed. The Met has since reopened the investigation to reassess evidence in the correct area.

=== Calls for resignation ===
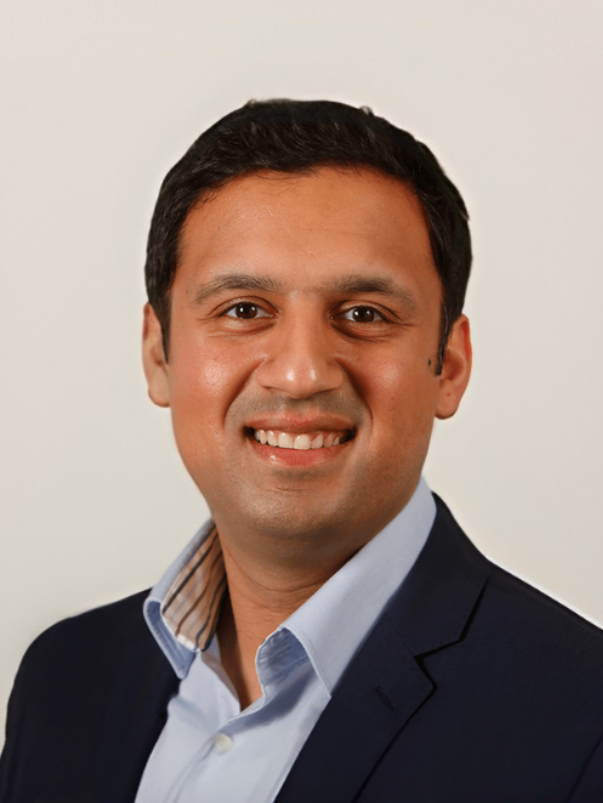
Anas Sarwar publicly called for Starmer to resign

On 9 February 2026, Scottish Labour Party leader Anas Sarwar held a press conference in Glasgow to publicly call for Starmer to resign. Sarwar stated that "the distraction needs to end and the leadership in Downing Street has to change," citing a series of "mistakes" that he believed were undermining Labour's prospects in the elections. Despite describing Starmer as a "decent man" and a "friend," Sarwar argued that his primary loyalty was to Scotland and that the Prime Minister's continued leadership was sabotaging the party's future.

Sarwar said he had spoken to Starmer earlier that day to inform him of his decision, stating that the two had "disagreed" on the necessity of his resignation. In the immediate aftermath, senior Cabinet members including Deputy Prime Minister David Lammy and Chancellor Rachel Reeves rallied behind Starmer, emphasising his mandate and urging party unity. Within Scottish Labour, the move caused significant friction; while Monica Lennon supported Sarwar's "leadership," others like former Scottish Secretary Ian Murray branded the call a threat to party stability. Opposition leaders John Swinney and Russell Findlay characterised the situation as "opportunism" and a "meltdown." Addressing the Parliamentary Labour Party later that evening, Starmer remained defiant, stating he had "won every fight I've ever been in" and refused to walk away.

The scandal, amid mounting wider public dissatisfaction with the Starmer ministry, contributed to Labour's poor results in the 2026 United Kingdom local elections. This led to the 2026 Labour Party leadership crisis in which over 95 Labour MPs had called on Starmer to resign or set out a departure timetable, and one cabinet minister (Health Secretary Wes Streeting), four junior ministers (including Jess Phillips), and four ministerial aides resigned in protest.

=== Dismissal of Olly Robbins ===
Olly Robbins had been appointed Permanent Under-Secretary of State at the Foreign, Commonwealth and Development Office (FCDO) on 8 January 2025. On 16 April 2026, Pippa Crerar at the Guardian reported that Mandelson had been denied security clearance by security vetting (UKSV) on 28 January 2025 but nevertheless had been "confirmed" to be ambassador two days later. A government spokesperson told the Guardian that "the decision to grant developed vetting to Peter Mandelson against the recommendation of UK Security Vetting was taken by officials in the FCDO".

During a summit in Paris, Starmer said "I was not told that he had failed security vetting, no minister was told", and denied that he had misled the House of Commons in February when saying that 'full due process had been followed.' Both Starmer and Foreign Secretary Yvette Cooper 'lost confidence' in Robbins and he was dismissed. Darren Jones, the prime minister's Chief Secretary said that the prime minister had not been told about the denial of clearance until 14 April 2026, and announced he had suspended a government department's ability to overrule the vetting process.

==== Parliamentary inquiries ====
Starmer delivered a statement to the House of Commons on 20 April 2026, while Emily Thornberry also invited Robbins to appear before the Foreign Affairs select committee on 21 April to be questioned over his role in the appointment of Mandelson. In his statement, Starmer maintained his position that blame lies firmly with the Foreign Office, claiming there had been a "deliberate decision" to withhold information about the vetting process from MPs. Robbins delivered his evidence to the Foreign Affairs Select Committee the following morning, where he argued that the Foreign Office had been put under "serious pressure" to push through Mandelson's appointment. During his appearance with the Committee, Robbins also claimed that Downing Street considered finding a job as a Head of Mission for Matthew Doyle, the then-director of communications at Number 10.

Following the appearance of Robbins at the committee, both Morgan McSweeney and Philip Barton were summoned to appear at the Foreign Affairs select committee on 28 April. The Conservative Party also requested that Starmer be investigated over claims he misled the Commons over comments regarding whether he followed "due process" and over his assertion that "no pressure whatsoever" was applied to officials at the Foreign Office. Other party leaders, including Ed Davey, supported the vote whilst Labour grandees including Gordon Brown issued public statements in support of the Prime Minister.

== Other responses ==
=== Virginia Giuffre's relatives ===
The surviving relatives of Virginia Giuffre, the most outspoken victim of Epstein and Maxwell (and accuser of Andrew Mountbatten-Windsor) who died by suicide months earlier in 2025, disapproved of Mandelson's appointment and stated that he should never have been appointed to the role to begin with. Giuffre's sister-in-law, Amanda Roberts, said: "Why does it take us to have to pull out the skeletons for people to be held accountable? Our governments have allowed these people to hold their status and their title without shame. He should never have been given that title. We have to put the spotlight on them. It's unfair we continuously pull these skeletons out, that survivors have to continuously point the finger for us to do the right thing." Sky Roberts, Giuffre's younger brother, said that the firing of Mandelson was a "step in the right direction" but "the reality is that's not nearly enough." Referencing Epstein's birthday book, he added, "there are still people out there, still people in that book who could be doing this to other young women and children right now."

=== Labour ministers ===
Health Secretary Wes Streeting's relationship with Mandelson has shifted from one of long-standing political mentorship to a public "defriending" following the revelations involving Epstein. Historically, the two were close allies; Mandelson reportedly viewed Streeting as a "keeper of the Blairite flame" and even canvassed for him to become Labour leader during the 2022 Beergate controversy. Their ties were further solidified by Streeting's husband, Joe Dancey, who previously worked as an adviser to Mandelson. As recently as September 2025, Streeting defended Mandelson after reports surfaced regarding Mandelson's ties to Epstein, stating that the public should not regard individuals as "guilty by association". However, in February 2026, following new evidence that Mandelson allegedly leaked sensitive government information to Epstein, Streeting accused Mandelson of a "terrible betrayal" of the country and two Prime Ministers. Streeting has since stated that he regrets his association with Mandelson, describing his actions as "outrageous" and insisting he must suffer the legal and political consequences. Despite this distancing, some Labour insiders suggest Streeting remains "tainted" by his years of closeness to Mandelson, which could impact his future leadership ambitions. Streeting later released all of his conversations with Mandelson from 2024 to 2025 to the public, stating "I have nothing to hide."

When Business Secretary Peter Kyle was asked if Mandelson's appointment was a mistake, Kyle said: "They [Giuffre's family] say it was a mistake. And retrospectively, if we had known the information that we know now, it is highly unlikely that he would have been appointed because what we know now is materially different to what we understood at the time."

When asked about Mandelson's payout following dismissal as an ambassador, Secretary of State for Work and Pensions Pat McFadden said he should probably give it back or give it to charity, suggesting one supporting victims of violence against women and girls, a sentiment echoed by a source from the Prime Minister's office. The Foreign Office said it had launched a review into the severance pay.

==== Angela Rayner ====
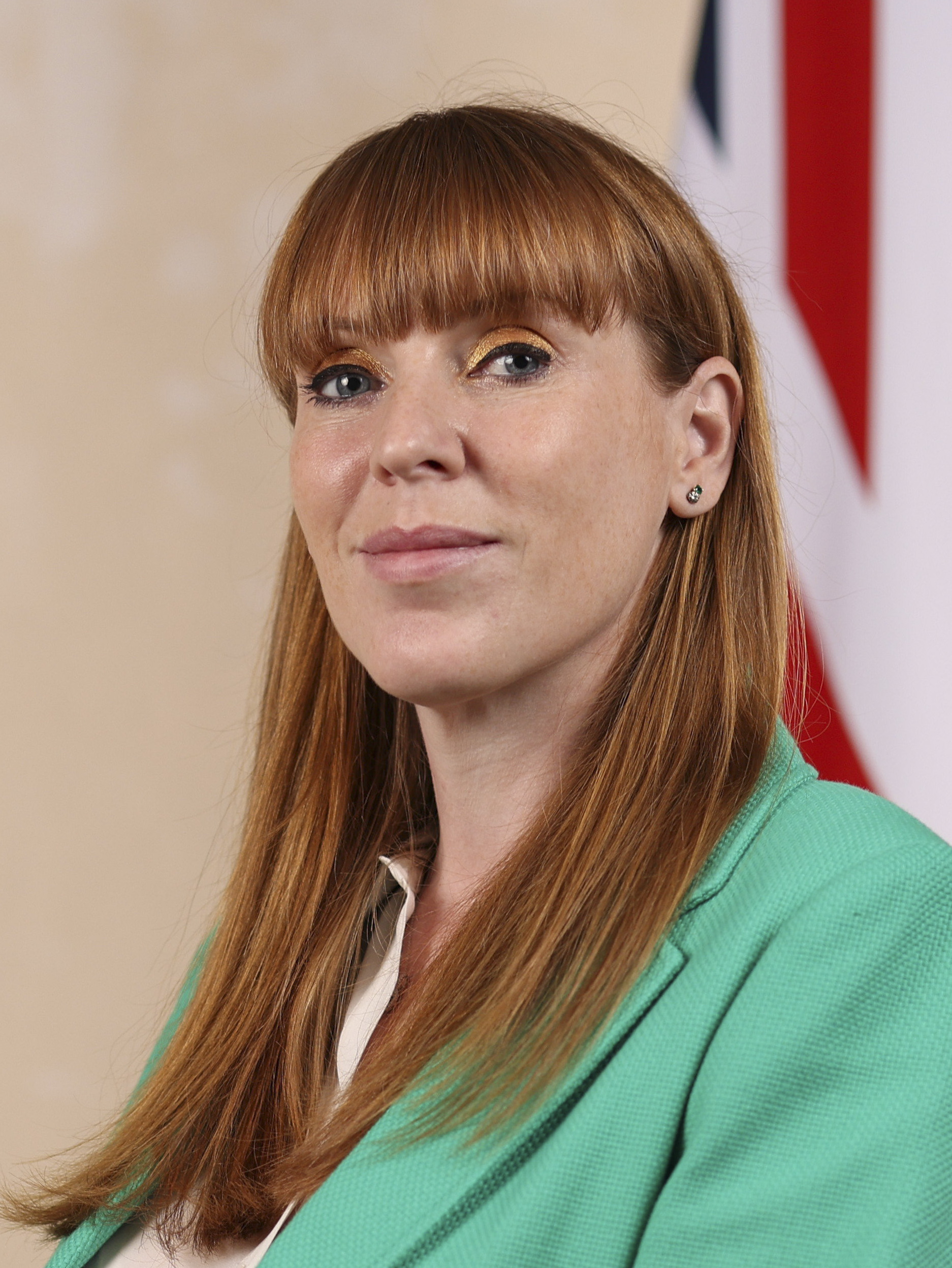
Angela Rayner reportedly privately warned Starmer against appointing Mandelson.

In early February 2026, reports emerged that former deputy prime minister Angela Rayner had privately warned Starmer against appointing Mandelson. Rayner's allies stated that she advised against the move in 2024, citing public evidence of Mandelson's continued friendship with Epstein following the financier's 2008 conviction. Rayner's intervention reportedly highlighted the potential for the appointment to become a significant political liability, a warning that gained renewed attention after Mandelson was sacked from the role in September 2025 following fresh revelations about his ties to Epstein.

Publicly, Rayner has taken a more active role in the unfolding scandal by leading a backbench push for greater transparency. During a House of Commons debate, she questioned the government's plan for disclosing vetting documents, asking if the Intelligence and Security Committee (ISC) should oversee the process to maintain "public confidence". Her stance effectively forced the government into a U-turn, ensuring that cross-party parliamentarians—rather than just the Cabinet Office—would determine which sensitive documents are released to the public. While Rayner herself resigned from the cabinet in late 2025 following an ethics investigation into her personal tax affairs, her recent actions have been interpreted by political observers as a signal of her leadership ambitions. Following a vote on the Mandelson files, she reportedly told colleagues, "I will be ready," amid mounting pressure on Starmer's judgement. Her comments and parliamentary manoeuvres have contributed to an increasingly difficult environment for Starmer, who has apologised for believing Mandelson's initial claims that he "barely knew" Epstein.

==== Gordon Brown ====
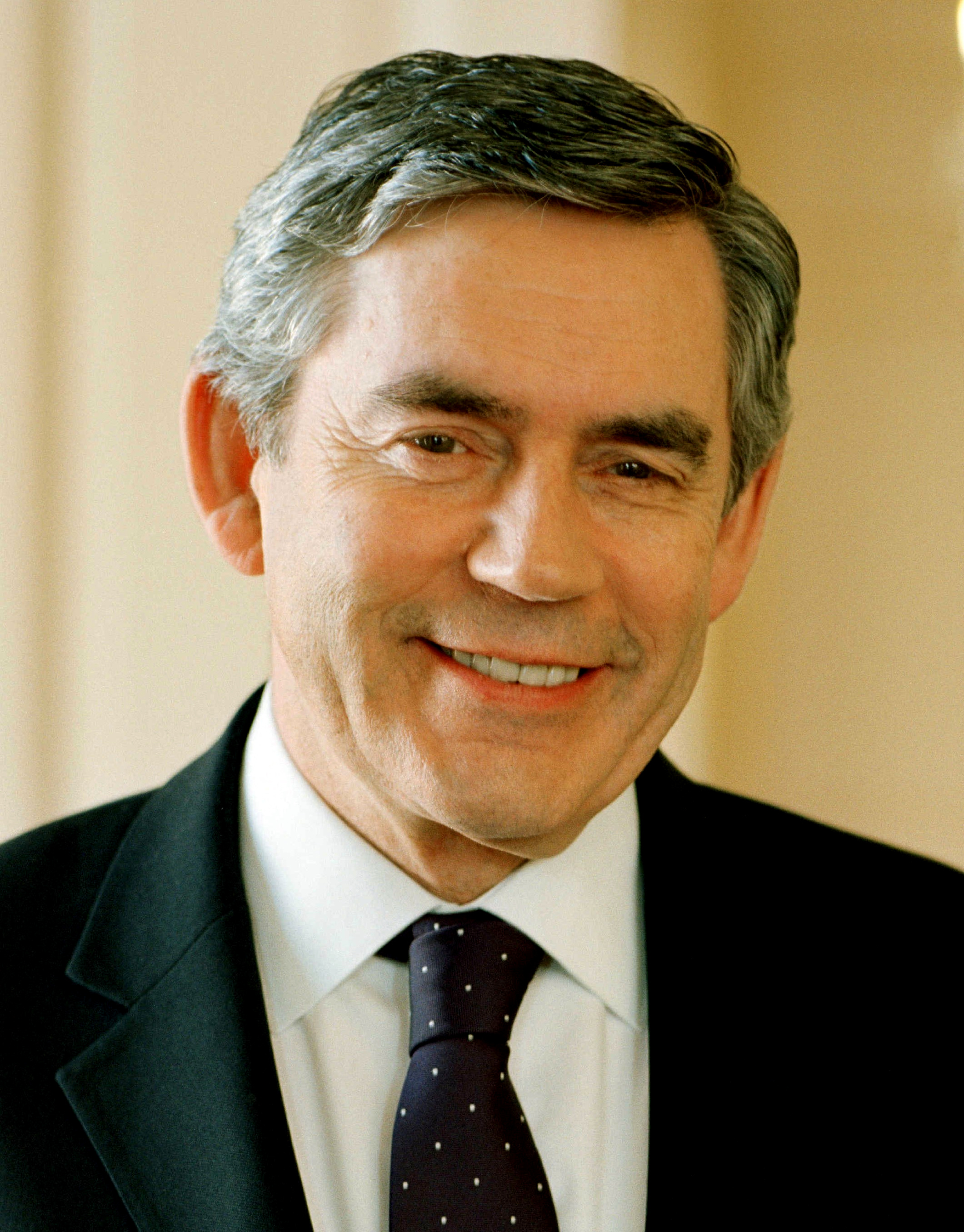
Gordon Brown issued a series of public condemnations of Mandelson and expressed deep personal revulsion and regret.

In September 2025, former prime minister Gordon Brown defended Starmer in the wake of Mandelson's dismissal over his links to Epstein, and stated he believed that Starmer would be "completely exonerated" over the affair. In an interview with Sky News, Brown supported Starmer's handling of the crisis and suggested that the public ultimately cares more about policy than about political personalities and scandals. When asked if the situation was a lapse in Starmer's judgement, Brown acknowledged that it "calls somewhat into his judgement" but maintained that Starmer faced difficult decisions. He predicted that Starmer would be "completely exonerated" once the full record of events was revealed, comparing the scrutiny to situations he faced during his own premiership.

In February 2026, Brown issued a series of public condemnations of Mandelson following the release of US Department of Justice documents detailing Mandelson's relationship with Epstein. Writing in The Guardian and speaking on BBC Radio 4's Today programme, Brown described Mandelson's alleged actions as a "betrayal of his country" and expressed deep personal revulsion and regret.

Brown specifically alleged that Mandelson "betrayed" the UK by leaking market-sensitive government information to Epstein during the 2008 global financial crisis, an act he said put the British currency at risk and could have caused "huge commercial damage". Brown said it was a "mistake" to bring Mandelson back into his Cabinet in 2008, stating he had been misled by reports that Mandelson's record as an EU Commissioner was "unblemished". In a Sky News interview, Brown described himself as feeling "shocked, sad, angry, betrayed, let down" by the email exchanges, which he characterised as a "systematic abuse of power" by a global network that believed it was above the law.

Brown said that Starmer had been "misled and betrayed" by Mandelson during the vetting process for his US Ambassadorship. Brown proposed sweeping ethical reforms to address what he called a "systemic failure" in vetting, including US-style public confirmation hearings for senior appointments and the creation of an independent anti-corruption commission with statutory powers of search and seizure. He also said that the leaked emails suggested Mandelson was planning a private-sector career and discussing potential jobs with banks while still serving as a government minister, which he called a "complete betrayal of his colleagues".

=== Opposition leaders and backbenchers ===
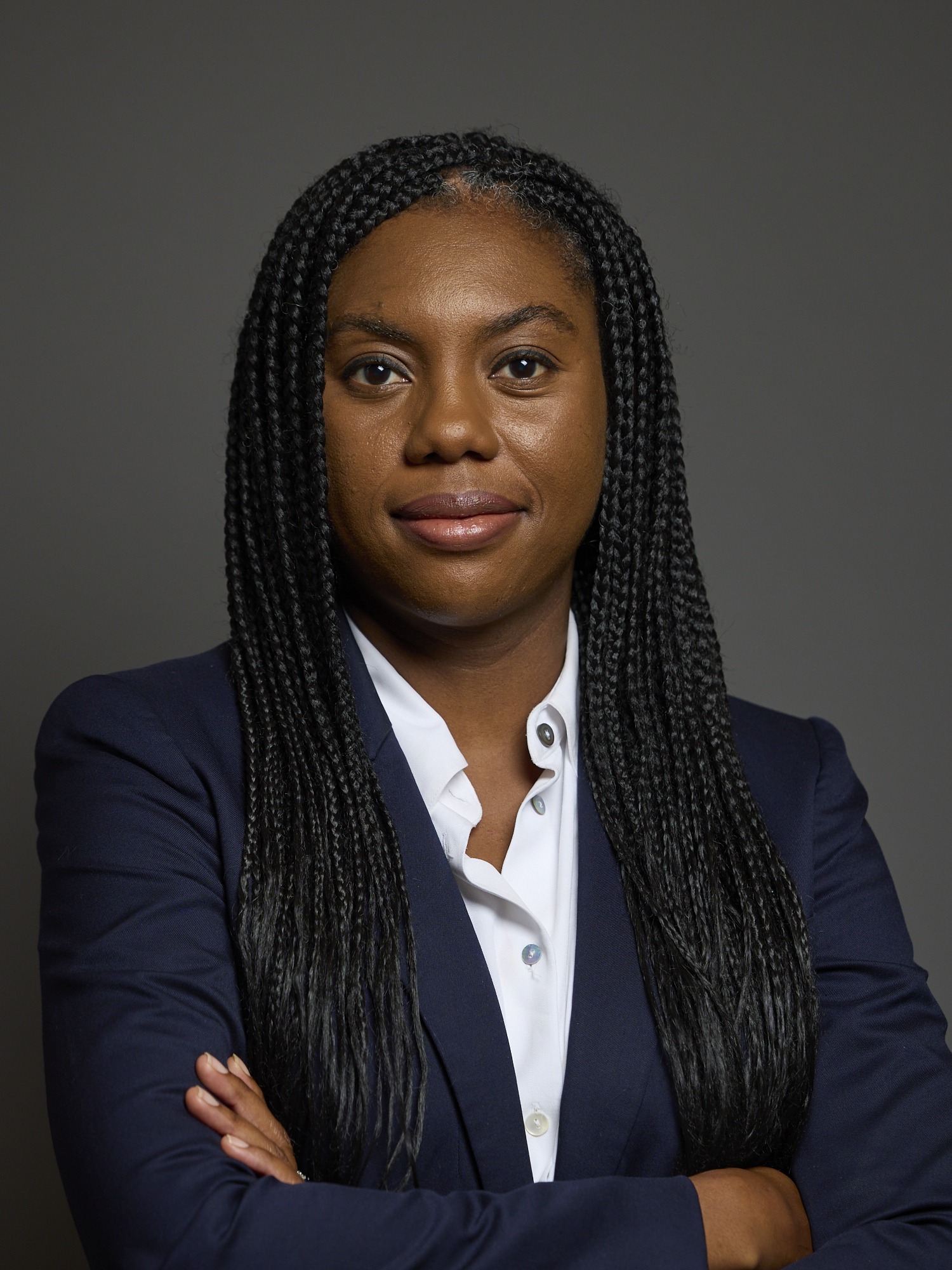
Kemi Badenoch has been a prominent critic of Starmer's handling of the scandal. Her response has focused on questioning Starmer's judgement and demanding full transparency

Kemi Badenoch, the leader of the opposition and Conservative Party leader, has been a prominent critic of Starmer's handling of the scandal. Her response has focused on questioning Starmer's judgement and demanding full transparency. In September 2025, she conducted a sustained offensive against Starmer following the revelation of Mandelson's ties to Epstein. During Prime Minister's Questions on 10 September, she characterised Mandelson's appointment as UK Ambassador to the US as a "disgrace" and a "complete disaster" for the Prime Minister's judgment, noting that Mandelson had referred to Epstein as his "best pal" during the same period Epstein was first convicted of child sex offences. Badenoch explicitly questioned if Starmer was aware of this "intimate relationship" when he chose Mandelson, eventually accusing the Prime Minister of "lying to the whole country" about what Downing Street knew and when they knew it.

On 13 September 2025, after reports emerged that Downing Street had held incriminating emails for 48 hours before sacking Mandelson, Badenoch argued that Starmer and his ministers had deliberately misled Parliament during the previous session of PMQs. She demanded "full transparency" and the release of the "Mandelson-Epstein files," including all vetting documents, to expose how such an appointment was approved against apparent security concerns. During an emergency debate on 16 September, Badenoch warned that the scandal was "overshadowing" a critical US state visit and argued that instead of discussing NATO security in the White House, the UK's representative was instead mired in a "grotesque failure" of accountability. She further targeted Starmer's chief of staff at the time, Morgan McSweeney, labeling him Mandelson's "protege" and calling for his removal, alleging he must have seen the vetting risks and pushed the appointment regardless. Throughout the month, Badenoch maintained that "the mask has slipped" for the Labour government, claiming they had prioritised political allies over national security and the protection of victims. Shadow education secretary Laura Trott vowed that the Conservatives would "use every mechanism" available "to understand what advice went to the prime minister and when", and called for "full transparency" from the government.

In early February 2026, Badenoch characterised the scandal as a "catastrophic error" that exposed Labour's poor judgement on both national security and diplomacy. During Prime Minister's Questions on 4 February, she challenged Starmer's claim that he was unaware of the depth of Mandelson's ties to Epstein. She noted that high-level reports regarding these connections were already available online and questioned why the Conservative research department could find such information while Number 10 apparently could not. She specifically pointed to a January 2024 Financial Times report that she claimed had already informed Starmer of Mandelson's stay at Epstein's home after his conviction. Badenoch also deployed an arcane parliamentary mechanism known as a "humble address" to compel the government to release the "Mandelson-Epstein files," which included security vetting papers and internal communications.

Badenoch argued that Starmer had waived away normal vetting procedures to appoint a "close friend and associate of a notorious and convicted paedophile". She further suggested that McSweeney, who was later forced to resign, was the "protégé" behind the appointment and should be held accountable. By 5 February, Badenoch escalated her rhetoric by declaring Starmer's position "untenable" and inviting Labour MPs to discuss a vote of no confidence. In a Daily Telegraph interview, she stated that Starmer "chose not to care" about the risks and expressed "no pity" for Mandelson as he faced a Metropolitan Police investigation for misconduct in public office. On BBC Radio 4's Today programme and whilst visiting a Conservative constituency, the opposition leader said Starmer should resign.

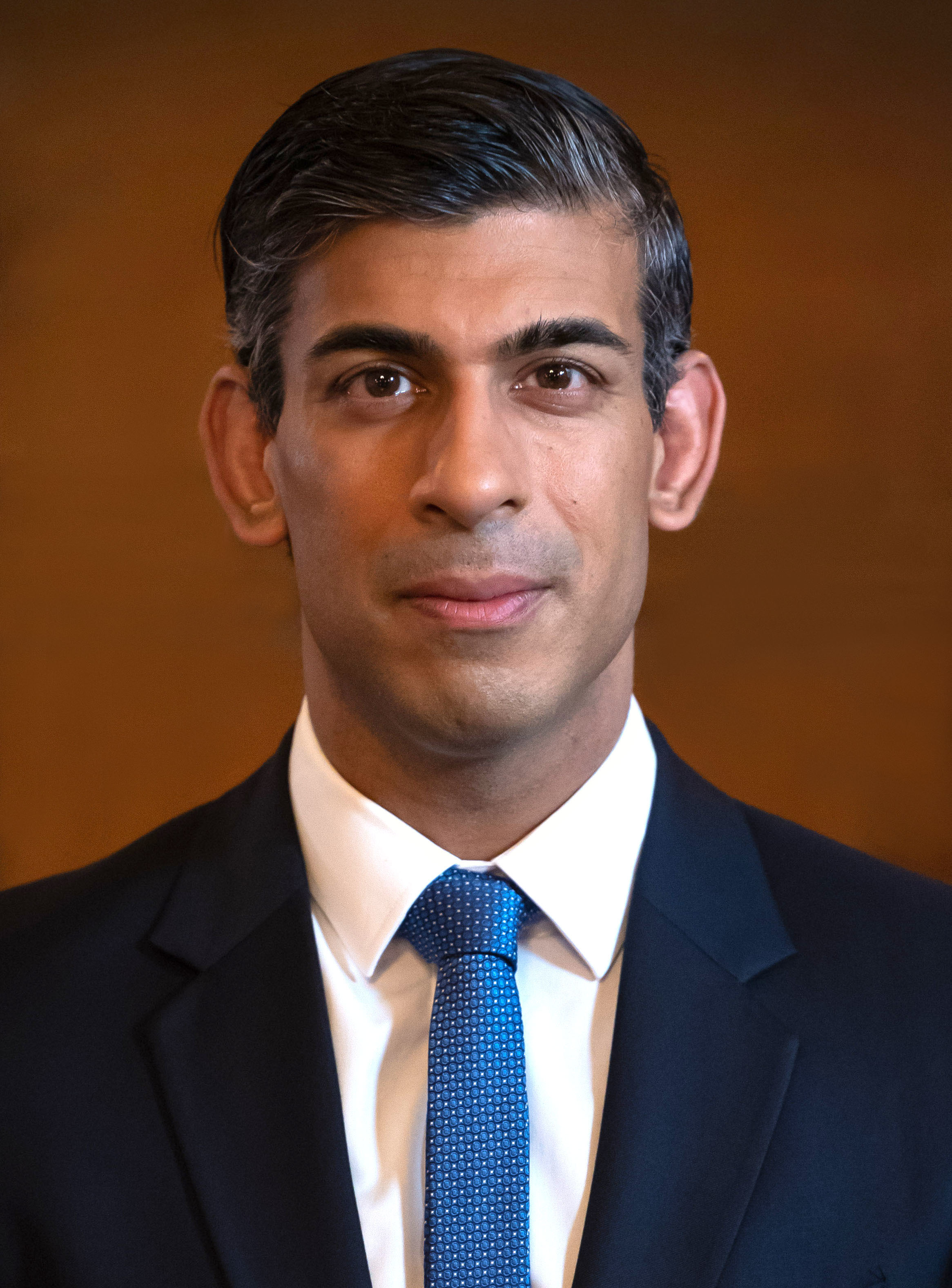
Rishi Sunak used the scandal to highlight systemic failures within the Cabinet Office

Former prime minister Rishi Sunak used the scandal to highlight systemic failures within the Cabinet Office. He described the ministerial vetting process as a "totally mad system," critiquing the fact that "developed vetting" often fails to occur for high-level appointments, leaving officials vulnerable to potential blackmail or past associations. He has used the scandal to promote his own previously rejected proposal that cabinet members should grant the government full access to their personal tax details to ensure transparency. Furthermore, Sunak has argued that the current administration's failure to query Mandelson's relationship with Epstein has led to "dire consequences" for the UK's diplomatic standing. While Badenoch has taken the lead on the constitutional breach of the Ministerial Code, Sunak has framed the issue as a failure of institutional oversight. He has also notably avoided the more heated identity-based arguments surrounding the fallout, preferring to focus on his own identity as "British, English and British Asian" while maintaining that the scandal is a matter of poor judgment by Starmer.

Shadow Foreign Secretary Dame Priti Patel said Mandelson's payout when dismissed from his ambassadorial role was a "a disgusting betrayal of Epstein's victims", called for it to be recovered and said Mandelson receiving the payout raised further concerns about the Prime Minister's judgement.

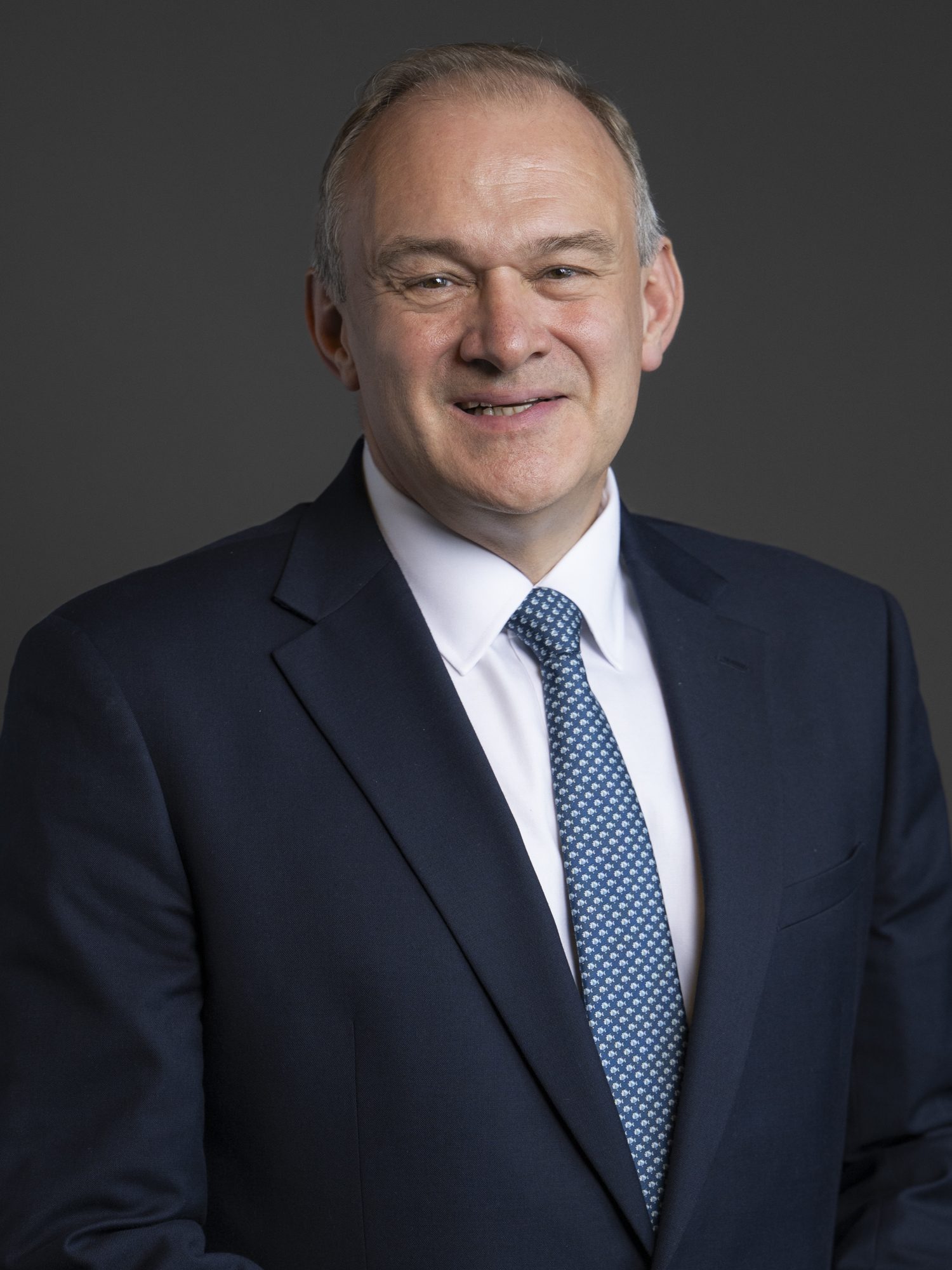
Ed Davey used the scandal to attack Starmer's judgement and call for greater transparency.

Ed Davey, the leader of the Liberal Democrats, has consistently criticised Mandelson and used the scandal to attack Starmer's judgement and call for greater transparency. Davey has described the ongoing situation as a "shambles" and a "Labour soap opera," calling for a full public inquiry to investigate allegations that Mandelson leaked sensitive government information. Following Mandelson's resignation from the House of Lords in early 2026, Davey stated that Mandelson had "jumped before he was pushed" and urged the government to bring forward legislation to strip him of his peerage. In Parliament, he questioned the Prime Minister on why Mandelson was ever appointed, suggesting that his past made him a national security risk who could be compromised by "embarrassing" secrets, and that Epstein's victims deserved Mandelson "not being appointed in the first place." Davey's stance has focused on seeking justice for Epstein's victims and ensuring accountability for what he termed one of the most "grievous breaches of national security". Deputy Leader Daisy Cooper called for a full review of vetting procedures, stating it was "extraordinary" that Mandelson could have been appointed without the prime minister knowing all the facts.

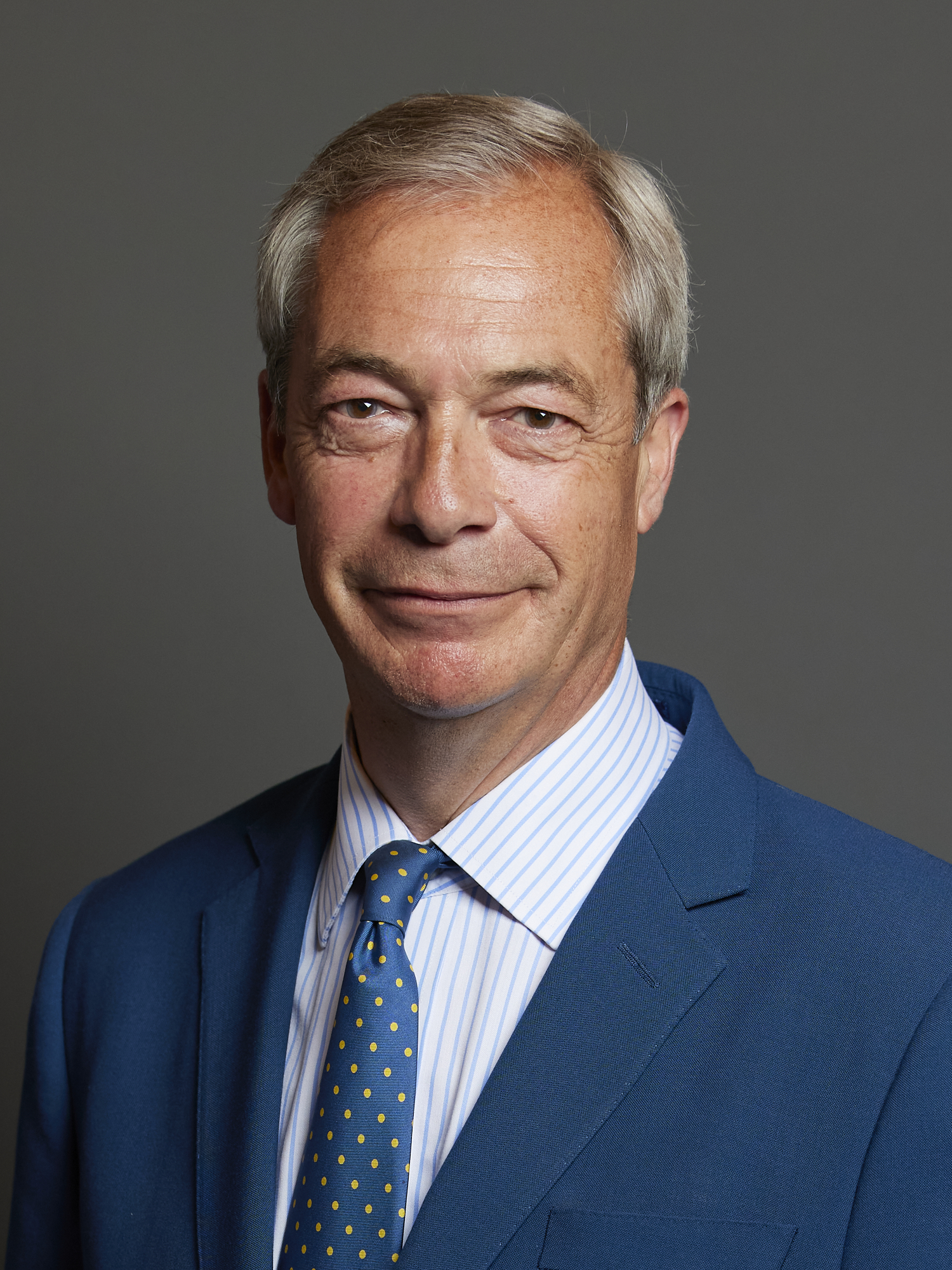
Nigel Farage branded the fallout from Mandelson the "biggest scandal in British politics for over one century," stating it surpassed historical events like the Profumo affair.

In February 2026, Nigel Farage, the leader of Reform UK, criticised Mandelson's relationship with Epstein. Farage branded the resulting fallout the "biggest scandal in British politics for over one century," stating it surpassed historical events like the Profumo affair. He accused Mandelson of "lying" about the extent of his ties to Epstein and suggested he should be investigated for potentially "breaching the Official Secrets Act" regarding the alleged sharing of market-sensitive information. Farage has leveraged the controversy to critique Starmer's leadership, describing the decision to involve Mandelson in the administration as a "grave error of judgement" and a "serious misjudgement." He dismissed Starmer's subsequent apologies as "very weak" and "not quite believable," maintaining that the Prime Minister likely ignored multiple warning signs before Mandelson's eventual dismissal.

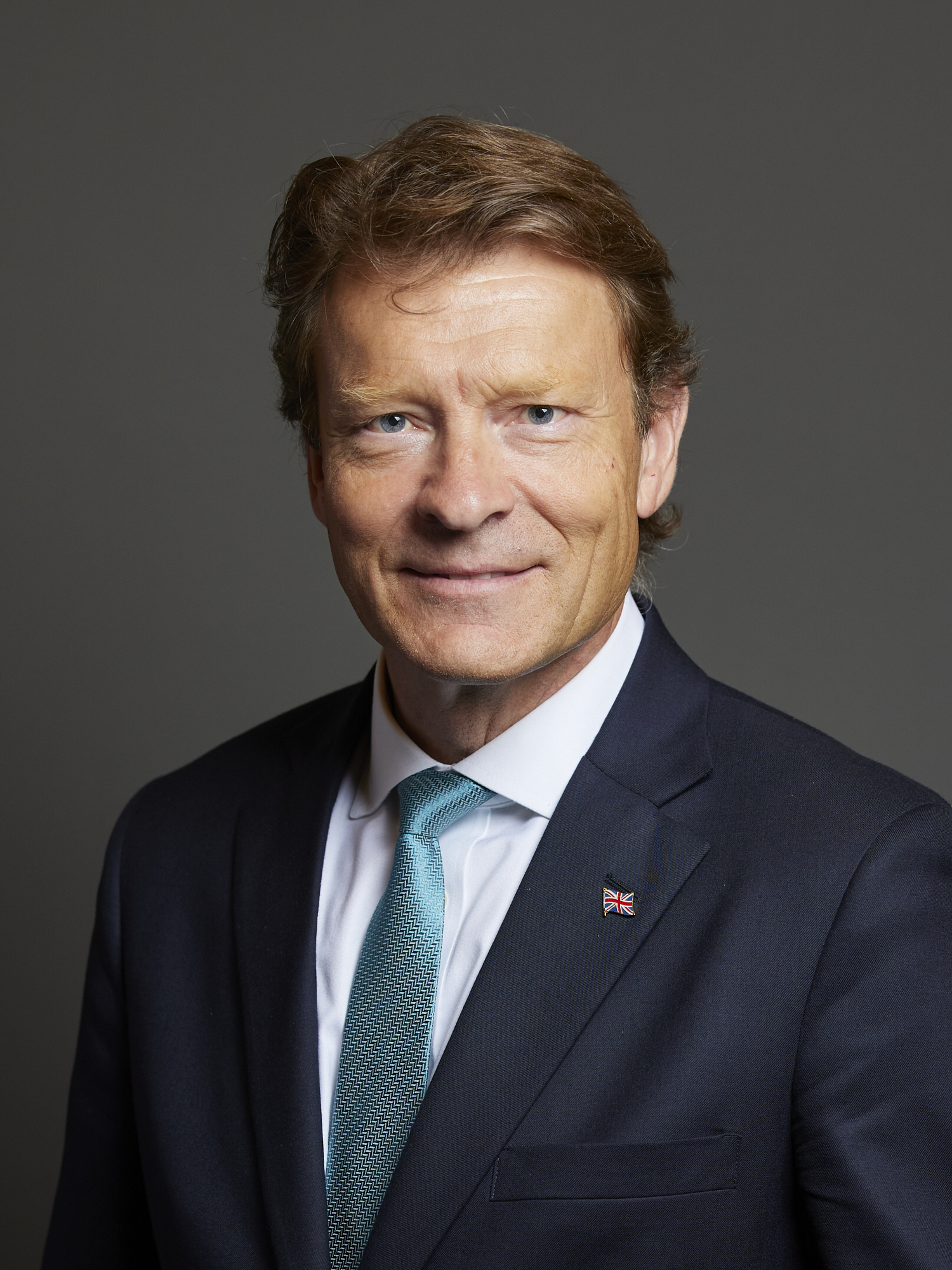
Richard Tice accused Starmer of having "woeful political judgment" and of misleading Parliament.

Richard Tice, the deputy leader of Reform UK, strongly criticised Starmer's handling of the scandal, accusing him of having "woeful political judgment" and of misleading Parliament. He said that Starmer had been "utterly humiliated on the world stage" by appointing Mandelson despite public knowledge of his links to Epstein, and that Starmer had misled the House of Commons by first expressing confidence in Mandelson on 10 September, then dismissing him a day later. He also questioned how Starmer could credibly maintain his confidence in Mandelson with the emerging evidence. Tice also raised questions about the vetting process for the appointment, saying that Starmer was wrong to claim that "full due process" had been followed. This came after it was revealed that Mandelson was not subjected to in-depth security vetting until after his appointment was announced. Tice suggested that Starmer would be "very lucky" to last as prime minister until May 2026, indicating his belief that the scandal will significantly damage Starmer's political standing.

Lindsay Hoyle, the Speaker of the House of Commons, announced an emergency debate on the scandal in the House of Commons. The debate focused on the inadequate vetting process that led to Mandelson's appointment, despite his known ties to Epstein. Foreign Secretary Yvette Cooper stated in a letter that the Foreign Office was not responsible for the failure to vet Lord Mandelson properly. She clarified that the due diligence was conducted by the Cabinet Office before the appointment was made public. The Foreign Office indicated that it was not asked to contribute to the initial vetting and distanced itself from the failure to recognise risks. This shifted responsibility towards the Cabinet Office and Starmer.

Starmer was heavily criticised for not attending the debate and for his judgement in appointing Mandelson. Opposition parties accused him of "hiding from questions" and called for an apology to Epstein's victims. The debate highlighted the newly published emails that triggered Mandelson's firing. Dame Emily Thornberry, chair of the Foreign Affairs Committee, said "red flags were missed or ignored" and called for a review to ensure such mistakes do not happen again. Some MPs also suggested that relevant parliamentary committees should conduct pre-appointment hearings for senior positions.

Conservative backbench MP David Davis, who secured the September 2025 debate, accused Starmer of poor judgement, questioned the integrity of the vetting process, and highlighted what he calls a double standard applied to "Labour royalty". Davis has described Labour's vetting process as "completely broken" and "implausible," stating that the information revealing Mandelson's close ties to Epstein was in "plain sight" long before the appointment. In the emergency debate, Davis told MPs that Starmer's standing had been "diminished" by the affair. He has also stated that it is "unfathomable" how Starmer could have thought it was wise to appoint someone with such a "chequered and murky background" to the important role of US ambassador. Davis has repeatedly called for full transparency, demanding that the government release all documents related to the appointment. He has also questioned whether Mandelson will receive compensation despite being dismissed and has pushed for ministers to be more accountable for their decisions.

During the debate, Davis launched a scathing attack on Mandelson's character, stating he was "easily dazzled by wealth and glamour" and that he "subcontracted his conscience for money". Davis has brought up Mandelson's previous resignations from government under Tony Blair—for an undeclared home loan and assisting a wealthy businessman with a passport—as examples of his "abiding flaws". Davis has also highlighted Mandelson's consulting work for "extremely dubious Russian and Chinese firms," arguing this should have been a red flag during the vetting process. Davis has argued that this case proves the need for greater accountability for ministers and public officials. By securing the emergency debate, Davis has forced the government to address the issue in the Commons and will continue to press for answers, stating he is not satisfied with the responses given so far. Davis has been among those calling for stronger parliamentary scrutiny of such appointments, suggesting candidates for ambassadorial roles should face cross-questioning from relevant select committees.

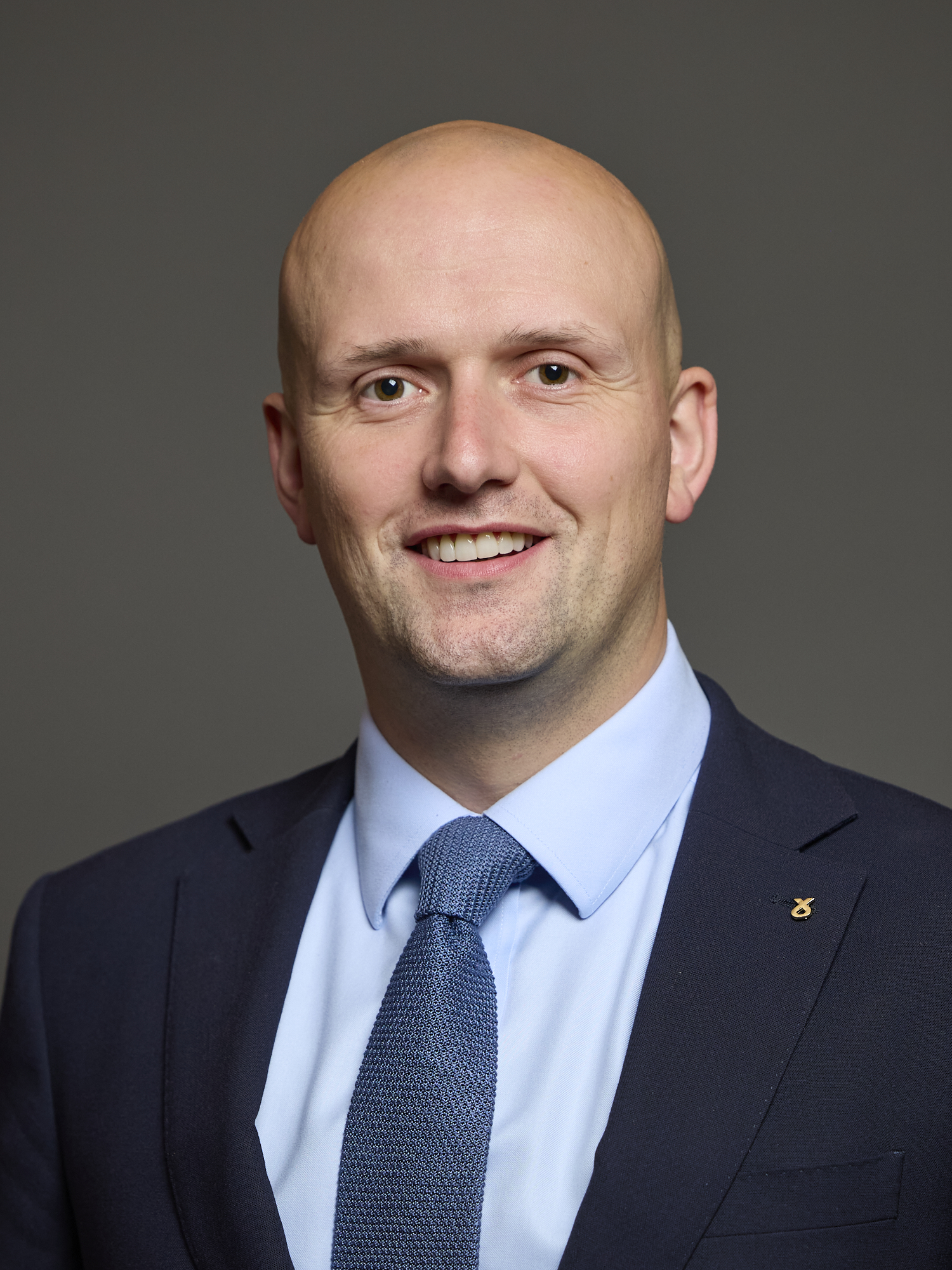
Stephen Flynn has been a vociferous critic of Starmer and the Labour government's handling of the scandal.

The Westminster leader of the Scottish National Party (SNP), Stephen Flynn, has been a vociferous critic of Starmer and the Labour government's handling of the scandal. Flynn's attacks have focused on what he perceives as a lack of a "moral compass" at the heart of government and a failure of judgement in appointing Mandelson despite his known ties to Epstein. During the parliamentary debate, Flynn called Mandelson's appointment a "complete disgrace" and argued that while Mandelson called his relationship with Epstein an "FT obsession", it had become "all of our obsession now". Flynn stated, "I do not know what it is about the decades of scandals and being best friends with a notorious child trafficker and paedophile, which should have got some alarm bells ringing in No 10 before this decision was taken".

Flynn has repeatedly demanded to know what Starmer knew about Mandelson's relationship with Epstein and when he knew it. He accused Starmer of ignoring "facts that were plainly in front of him not for weeks, not for hours, not for days but for months" and specifically criticised Starmer for appointing Mandelson as ambassador "knowing that that man had maintained a relationship with Jeffrey Epstein" after his 2008 conviction. After Starmer failed to attend the emergency debate on the scandal, Flynn accused the Prime Minister of "going into hiding" and suggested that while the Labour government has lurched from "one crisis to another," the "only constant in all this chaos is Keir Starmer himself". Beyond Mandelson's dismissal, the SNP has demanded further action. An early day motion was lodged by SNP MP Brendan O'Hara, with Flynn's support, urging Starmer to strip Mandelson of his peerage and permanently remove him from the public payroll. Flynn called for all government documents relating to the appointment and vetting to be published.

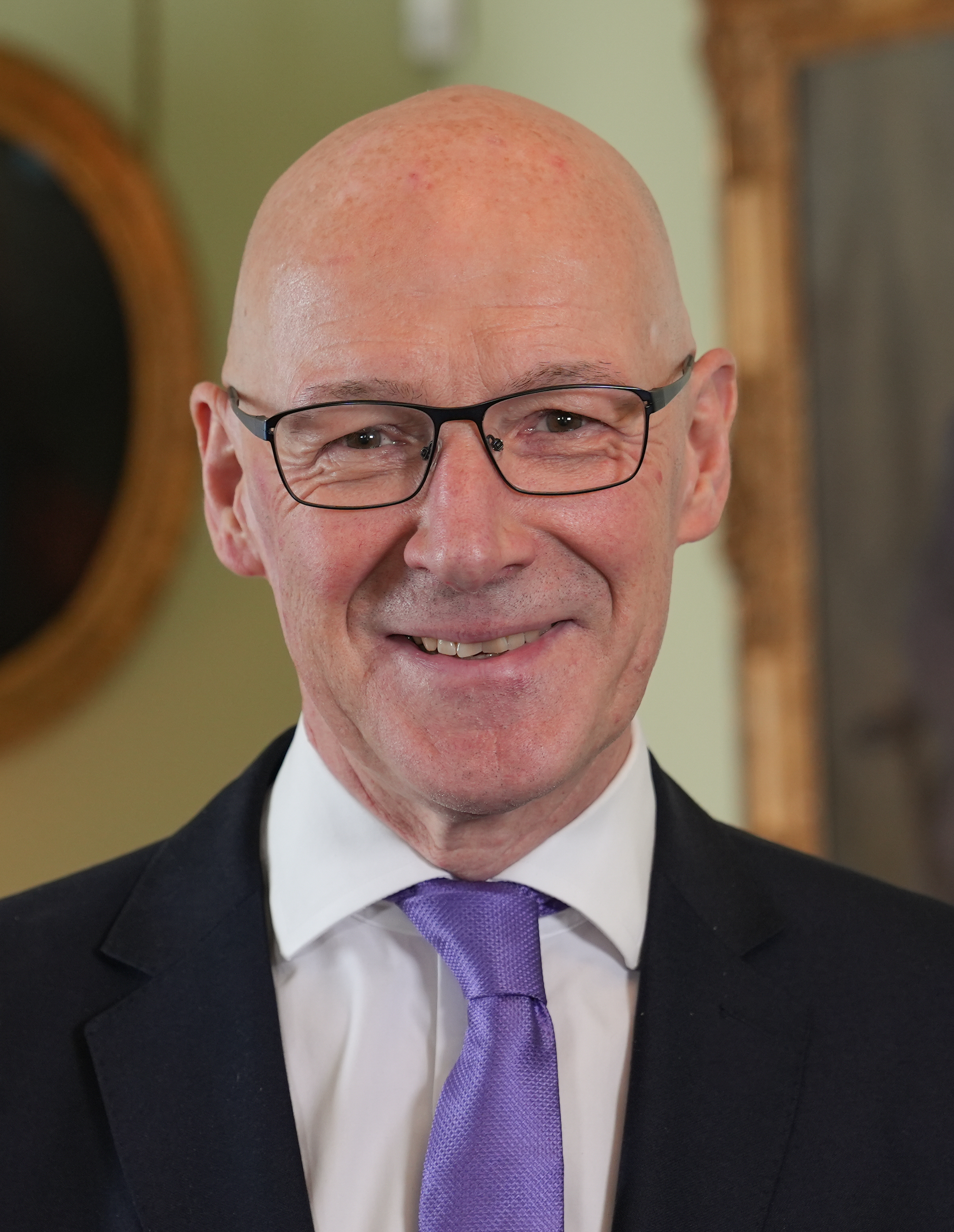
John Swinney questioned Starmer's judgement and said he "should have looked a bit more carefully at his decision".

Scottish First Minister John Swinney questioned Starmer's judgement. When speaking to journalists, Swinney said that in light of the new information that had come out about Mandelson's links to Epstein, the dismissal was "not surprising". Swinney criticised Starmer for appointing Mandelson as ambassador in the first place, suggesting the Prime Minister "should have looked a bit more carefully at his decision". Swinney warned that the Mandelson row, along with other internal UK government issues, could risk derailing efforts to secure a better US trade deal for Scotch whisky. He called this a "very real risk" and said the UK government was "completely distracted".

Swinney had held meetings with Trump about whisky tariffs just before Mandelson's dismissal. He said that the UK government's trade negotiators were still pursuing the deal and that he would ensure it had "full UK government impetus". The SNP highlighted the scandal as evidence of Scotland's "diplomatic disadvantage" within the UK, stating that unlike countries of similar size, such as Ireland, Scotland lacks a full foreign office. The scandal broke while Swinney was in Washington D.C., where he had a breakfast meeting with Mandelson at the British embassy to discuss the whisky tariff issue. This was part of a wider visit to lobby on behalf of the Scottish whisky industry ahead of a US state visit. This proximity to the unfolding scandal placed Swinney in a unique position to comment on it.

Harriet Harman, a former Labour MP and cabinet minister and current UK special envoy for women and girls who has previously described herself as a detractor of Mandelson, stated on Beth Rigby's podcast Electoral Dysfunction that his failure to resign was "shameful". She argued that Mandelson should have known the gravity of his relationship with Epstein and stepped down in the "national interest" rather than being forced to leave. She described his appointment as ambassador to the US as a "horrible, awful episode" and expressed disbelief that Mandelson would send messages of "love and support" to a convicted sex offender, particularly as she serves as the UK's special envoy for women and girls. She publicly sided with Starmer's decision to dismiss Mandelson, stating, "it was right that Keir Starmer sacked him".

During Prime Minister's Questions on 4 February 2026 and a subsequent debate, the political landscape shifted as figures from all parties responded to the fallout of the Mandelson scandal. Reports from within the Labour Party via The Guardian indicated a "dark" mood, with some MPs describing the Prime Minister's admission as "brutal" and potentially damaging to the long-term stability of the government. Badenoch attacked Starmer's judgement, asserting that he had ignored clear warnings and "injected poison" into the government. She successfully led the Conservative Party's push for an opposition day motion to force the disclosure of vetting documents related to Mandelson's appointment as British Ambassador to the Intelligence and Security Committee. Tice, characterised Mandelson's conduct as "indefensible" and suggested the Prime Minister's position was increasingly precarious, while Robert Jenrick formally requested that Mandelson's ministerial pension be forfeited and redirected to charities supporting victims of sexual abuse. This was echoed by Flynn, who termed the entire episode a "betrayal" of Epstein's victims. Davey similarly focused on the moral implications, questioning if the victims had been considered at any stage of the appointment process. Independent MP Jeremy Corbyn dismissed internal investigations as insufficient, calling instead for a full independent public inquiry into the "web" of connections. Independent MP Zarah Sultana also demanded an end to what she described as a "cover-up."

=== Concern over potential impact on Trump state visit ===
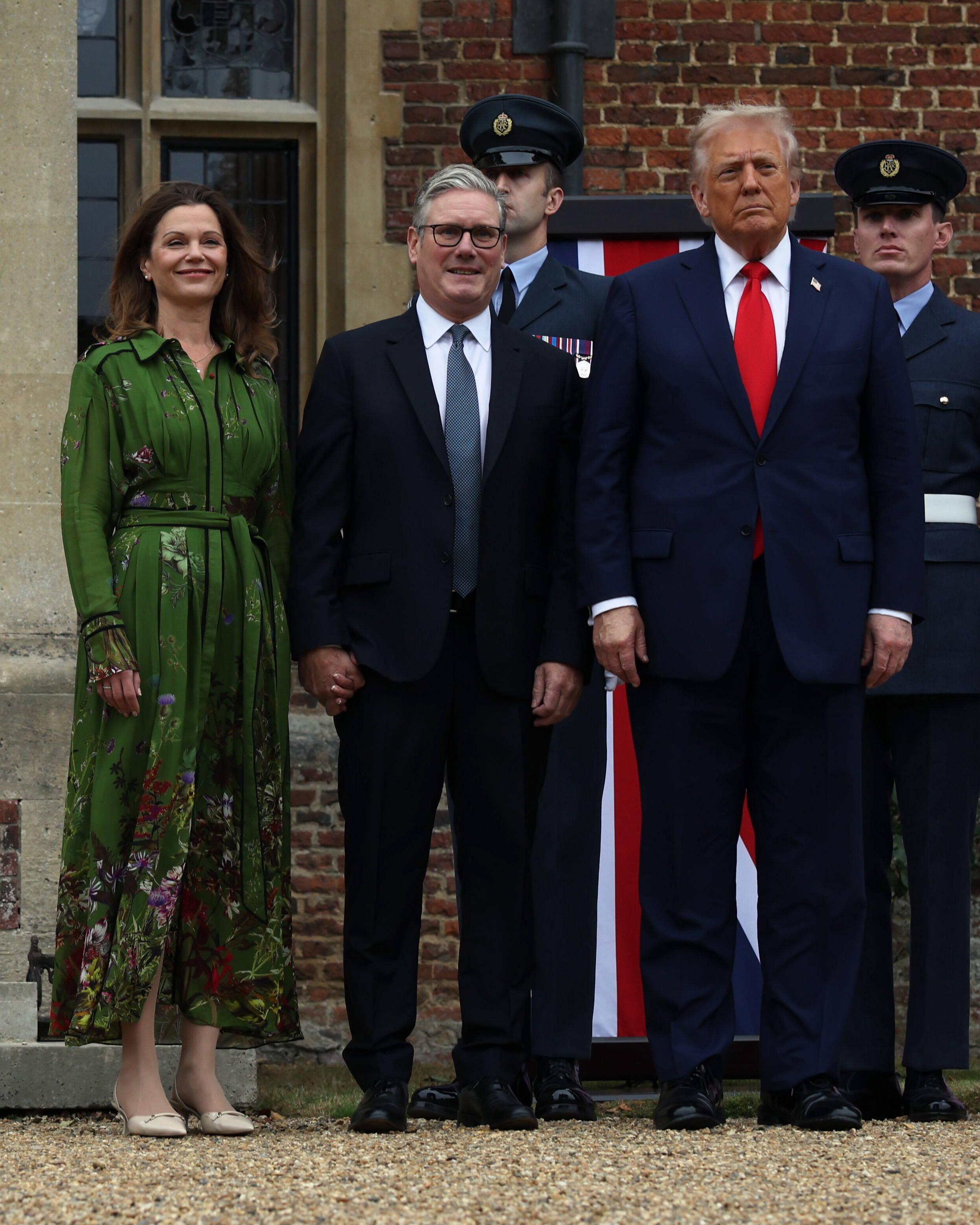
The scandal created a diplomatic predicament for Trump, and his team were reportedly concerned about the timing.

As the initial revelations about Mandelson were revealed shortly before the state visit by Donald Trump to the United Kingdom, it created a diplomatic predicament for Trump, and his team were reportedly concerned about the timing, as Trump faced major backlash at the time over his own association with Epstein and his initial refusal to release the Epstein files despite previously promising to do so; Trump later approved their release which resulted in the subsequent Mandelson revelations being revealed. A source with knowledge of the White House's discussions said that Trump's team was "nervy" about anything that could resurface the Epstein scandal, and they were concerned Mandelson's dismissal would overshadow the UK state visit. The Guardian noted that with Trump having his own well-documented links to Epstein, "there is no subject he wants to revisit less" than the scandal surrounding Mandelson's ties to him. For Trump, whose priority was to avoid distractions during the state visit, the controversy arrived at an "especially awkward" time.

On 15 September 2025, members of the UK collective Everyone Hates Elon installed a 400-square-metre print of a widely circulated photograph of Trump and Epstein on the lawns of Windsor Castle. On 17 September, journalists were detained for questioning after police confiscated an advertising van associated with the group People vs Elon that was displaying images of Trump and Epstein on the streets of Windsor. On 16 September, members of the Led By Donkeys protest group, which had also targeted Trump during his last visit to the UK, projected a nine-minute video discussing Trump and Epstein's relationship from a hotel room opposite Windsor. The video also included a photograph and video clip of Virginia Giuffre, a widely circulated photograph of Andrew with Epstein, and photographs of Epstein's accomplice Maxwell. Officers reportedly investigated the projection to "swiftly" stop it. Four individuals were arrested the following day, which according to an official statement by Thames Valley Police, was done on the grounds of malicious communications and an "unauthorised projection". They included a 60-year-old from East Sussex, a 36-year-old and a 50-year-old from London, and a 37-year-old from Kent. All four were released on conditional bail until 12 December. The investigation concluded, with no further action taken, on 22 October.

According to Led By Donkeys, it was the first time anyone from the group had been arrested for a projection. Led by Donkeys later told The Guardian that the arrests were "Orwellian" and "ridiculous". They mentioned that they had made between 25 and 30 projections prior to these arrests. They stated in their interview:

"Forgive the cliche, but it is rather Orwellian for a piece of journalism, which raises questions about our guest's relationship with America's most notorious child sex trafficker to lead to arrests." "We're constantly told, you know, we need to see peaceful protests. Well, here's a peaceful protest ... We projected a piece of journalism on to a wall and now people have been arrested for malicious communications. I think that, frankly, says a lot more about the policing of Trump's visit than it does about what we did." "Trump is being welcomed to our country, being given the unique honour of a second state visit, and it's being housed at our expense at Windsor Castle," they said. "This is like The Emperor's New Clothes – you've got to point at it and say, 'Hang on. You know, this guy has incredibly close links to America's most notorious child sex trafficker. We probably need to talk about that.' And so we decided to build a film that would tell that story."

The morning of 17 September, a van parked outside Windsor Castle displayed an image of Trump and Epstein alongside the text: "Welcome to the UK, Donald." During a press conference held in the UK on 18 September 2025, Trump claimed he did not know who Mandelson was, despite having met him multiple times. Trump made the statement when asked if he had any sympathy for Mandelson after he was dismissed from his role as ambassador. In response, Trump stated: "I don't know him, actually." He added that it was a choice made by the prime minister and suggested Starmer was better placed to speak on the matter. Despite Trump's claim of not knowing Mandelson, multiple sources and photographic evidence show they have met on several occasions. In May 2025, Mandelson stood with Trump in the Oval Office during the announcement of a US-UK trade framework. Photos captured the two shaking hands and smiling together. According to Mandelson, Trump commented on his "beautiful accent" during one Oval Office meeting. Mandelson also received a signed note from Trump that read, "Peter, great job!" This was the second time Trump attempted to distance himself from an Epstein associate; in December 2019 he claimed to not know Andrew, despite multiple sources and photographic evidence showing they have met on several occasions.

=== Revoked honorary awards and titles ===
Mandelson has been stripped of honorary awards and titles following the revelation of his links to Epstein. Manchester Metropolitan University Business School rescinded his honorary awards, including an honorary doctorate and a commemorative medal, in September 2025. Mandelson was the university's chancellor from 2016 to 2024. Mandelson resigned as an honorary fellow of St Catherine's College, Oxford, in November 2025. Councillors in his former constituency voted unanimously to remove his civic honour of Freedom of the Borough of Hartlepool in October 2025. He was also removed from the ceremonial role of High Steward of Hull in September 2025.

== See also ==
- Relationship of Donald Trump and Jeffrey Epstein
- Relationship of Bill Clinton and Jeffrey Epstein
- Relationship of Prince Andrew and Jeffrey Epstein
- Relationship of Mette-Marit, Crown Princess of Norway, and Jeffrey Epstein
- Relationship of Les Wexner and Jeffrey Epstein
- List of people named in the Epstein files
- Guillaume affair
