= HMG Infosec Standard No.1 =

HMG Information Assurance Standard No.1, usually abbreviated to IS1, was a security standard applied to government computer systems in the UK.

The standard was used to assess – and suggest responses to – technical risks to the confidentiality, integrity and availability of government information. The modelling technique used in the standard was an adaptation of Domain Based Security. In confidentiality terms, IS1 did not apply to information which was not protectively marked, but it may still have been used to assess risks to the integrity and availability of such information.

The UK Cabinet Office Security Policy Framework requires that all ICT systems that manage government information or that are interconnected to them are assessed to identify technical risks. IS1 was the standard method for doing this and was mandated by previous versions of the Security Policy Framework, but other methods may now be used.

The results of an IS1 assessment, and the responses to risks, were recorded using HMG Information Assurance Standard No.2, usually abbreviated to IS2, which concerned risk management and was relevant to the accreditation of government computer systems.

CESG provided IS1 risk assessment tools.

== Example ==
An HMG IS2 Full Accreditation Statement based on an HMG IS1 ITSHC (IT Security Health Check) by Deloitte and subsequent remediation by Recipero of its interface between Recipero's NMPR and the UK government's PNC, which are systems used to track mobile devices for law enforcement purposes was posted publicly. A public HMG IS2 Full Accreditation Statement based on an actual ITSHC (by Deloitte in this case) puts the auditor's reputation on the line, in a way that a confidential statement does not.

== See also ==
- Cyber Essentials
- Information assurance
- Joint Services Publication 440
- Infosec Standard 5
