= Shoulder (disambiguation) =

A shoulder is a group of three bones in the human body.

Shoulder may also refer to:

== Arts, entertainment, and media ==
- Shoulders (band), band whose several former members formed the band Constantines
- "Shoulders", a song by Coheed and Cambria from their 2022 album Vaxis – Act II: A Window of the Waking Mind
- "Shoulders" (song), a song by the Australian–American band For King & Country from their 2014 album Run Wild. Live Free. Love Strong
- "Shoulders", a song by the Cat Empire from their 2010 album Cinema

== Other uses ==
- Shoulder (road), an emergency stopping lane by the verge of a road or motorway
- Alan Shoulder (1953–2025), English footballer and football manager
- Darin Shoulders (born 1968), American football player
- "Shoulders," nickname of Barry Latman, Major League Baseball pitcher
- Shoulder, a term used in sensitometry

== See also ==
- Cold shoulder
- Head and shoulders (disambiguation)
- Topographic prominence, e.g., a shoulder crop
