= Joint Services Publication 440 =

2001 British restricted-security manual

Joint Services Publication 440 ("JSP 440") is the name of a British 2001 Ministry of Defence 2,400-page restricted security manual, detailing the requirements for units with regards to all areas of security both physical and electronic. This has been interpreted in the media as instructions for avoiding leaks due to hackers, journalists, and foreign spies; however, that is only a small part of the document.

The publication was posted on WikiLeaks on 3 October 2009.

== See also ==
- IS1
- Government Communications Headquarters
