= Security vetting in the United Kingdom =

In the United Kingdom, government policy requires that staff undergo security vetting in order to gain access to government information.

The government uses four levels of personnel security controls depending on the level of assurance required. Three of these levels are types of national security vetting clearance.

Vetting is intended to assure government bodies that the individual has not been involved in espionage, terrorism, sabotage or actions intended to overthrow or undermine Parliamentary democracy by political, industrial or violent means. It also assures the department that the individual has not been a member of, or associated with, an organisation which has advocated such activities or has demonstrated a lack of reliability through dishonesty, lack of integrity or behaviour. Finally, the process assures the department that the individual will not be subject to pressure or improper influence through past behaviour or personal circumstances.

Vetting is usually carried out by United Kingdom Security Vetting (UKSV), a department within the Cabinet Office. UKSV was created in January 2017 by combining DBS National Security Vetting (DBS NSV) and FCDO Services National Security Vetting (FCDOS NSV). This change was an outcome of the Strategic Defence and Security Review 2015.

It is possible to pass vetting with one department yet fail it with another as vetting is tailored to the role/department. Clearances can be transferred between departments. Holders of vetting clearance may face travel restrictions on private travel to high-risk countries. It can also happen, and has happened, that a person who fails vetting may be granted security clearance anyway by a government minister.

== Types of personnel security check ==
=== Baseline Personnel Security Standard (BPSS) ===
The Baseline Personnel Security Standard (BPSS) checks are normally performed when a person is recruited.

All those with access to government assets are subject on recruitment to the requirements of the Baseline Personnel Security Standard. This includes all applicants for employment in the civil service and armed forces and applies to both permanent and temporary staff and private sector employees working on government contracts, with access to government assets.

The Baseline Personnel Security Standard requires the verification of the following four elements:

1. Identity
2. Employment history (past three years)
3. Nationality and immigration status
4. Criminal record (unspent convictions only)

A reasonable account of any significant periods (a total of 6 months or more in the past 3 years) spent abroad. Prospective employees who have recently come to the UK or lived abroad may be asked to provide overseas police certificates of good conduct.

BPSS

- Allows access to UK OFFICIAL assets and occasional access to UK SECRET assets
- Is required to work in areas where SECRET and TOP SECRET information may be overheard
- Grants access to the Public Services Network (PSN) to individuals who require it

Employers may initiate the following incremental national security vetting checks on recruits after performing the BPSS check.

=== Counter Terrorist Check (CTC)/Level 1B ===
A Counter Terrorist Check (CTC)/Level 1B is required for individuals who are employed in posts that:

- Involve proximity to public figures assessed to be at particular risk from terrorist attack.
- Give access to information or material assessed to be of value to terrorists. However, it is not designed to manage access to sensitive information.
- Involve unescorted access to certain military, civil, industrial or commercial establishments assessed to be at particular risk from terrorist attack.

The process for CTC clearance includes:

- BPSS check;
- Completion of a security clearance questionnaire by the candidate;
- Checks against UK criminal records covering both spent and unspent convictions;
- Checks against Security Service (MI5) records;
- It may also include an interview.

A CTC/Level 1B clearance must be formally reviewed after ten years (five years for non-List X Contractors).

In the transport sector security vetting requirements, including for Counter Terrorist Check, is regulated by the Department of Transport.

A CTC/Level 1B is required for police officers and many associated staff.

=== Security Check (SC) ===
A Security Check (SC) is the most widely held level of security clearance. SC is required for posts involving regular and uncontrolled access to SECRET assets and/or occasional, supervised access to TOP SECRET assets, and for individuals who:

- While not in such posts, will be in a position to directly or indirectly bring about the same degree of damage.
- Will have sufficient knowledge to obtain a comprehensive picture of a SECRET plan, policy or project.
- Are being considered for employment where it would not be possible to make reasonable career progress without security clearance for access to SECRET assets.
- Require access to certain levels of classified material originating from another country or international organisation.

The process for SC clearance includes:

- Successful completion of the Baseline Personnel Security Standard.
- Completion, by the individual, of a Security Questionnaire.
- A departmental/company records check which will include e.g. personal files, staff reports, sick leave returns and security records.
- A check of both spent and unspent criminal records.
- A check of credit and financial history with a credit reference agency.
- A check of Security Service (MI5) records.
- Checks on foreign travel/foreign contacts.
- It may also include an interview.

Checks may extend to third parties included on the security questionnaire.

An SC security clearance must be formally reviewed after ten years (seven years for non-List X contractors) or at any time up to that point at the discretion of the vetting authority.

=== Enhanced Security Check (eSC) ===
This is similar to an SC but also includes a financial questionnaire and may include an interview with a vetting officer. It is a pre-requisite for the granting of access to STRAP codeword material at the SECRET level.

=== Developed Vetting (DV) ===
DV is one of the most detailed and comprehensive form of security clearance in UK government. It is needed for posts that require individuals to have frequent and uncontrolled access to TOP SECRET assets, or require any access to TOP SECRET codeword material. It is also required for individuals who:

- While not in such posts, will be in a position to directly or indirectly bring about the same degree of damage.
- Require frequent and uncontrolled access to Category I nuclear material.
- Require access to certain levels of classified material originating from another country or international organisation.

The process for DV clearance includes:

- BPSS check.
- Completion, by the individual, of a Security Questionnaire, a DV Supplement and Financial Questionnaire.
- A check of both spent and unspent criminal records.
- A check of credit and financial history with a credit reference agency.
- A check of Security Service (MI5) records.
- A full review of personal finances.
- Checks on foreign travel/foreign contacts.
- A detailed interview conducted by a vetting officer.
- Further enquiries, including interviews with referees conducted by a vetting officer.

A DV security clearance must be reviewed every seven years or at any time up to those points at the discretion of the vetting authority.

=== Enhanced Developed Vetting (eDV) ===
Enhanced Developed Vetting requires additional in-depth interviews, beyond that of DV, including a full list of all foreign travel within the last 10 years. It is required for a limited number of highly sensitive roles and can only be requested by a small number of government departments.

=== Caveats/nationality restrictions ===
A clearance of any level can be granted with "caveats" which may restrict the holder from accessing certain types of material, for example relating to specific countries, regions or projects. Where there is an explicit requirement for the viewer of a document to be a UK citizen, the individual must hold a clearance with no "caveats" and be deemed to meet "UK Eyes Only". Further restrictions can include "No Dual Nationals".

== Clearance aftercare ==
=== Change of personal circumstances ===
A change of personal circumstances (CPC) questionnaire has to be submitted when a CTC, SC, eSC, DV, eDV, STRAP clearance holder is "marrying, remarrying, entering into a civil partnership, setting up a stable unmarried relationship which includes living with someone as a couple", "due to significant changes in financial circumstances" or "due to contact with law enforcement". DV clearance holders also have to report the arrival of new "co-residents" such as a lodger or flatmate.

=== Annual Security Appraisals/Aftercare Reports ===
Holders of eSC, DV and eDV must annually complete a "Security Appraisal Form" (SAF) in conjunction with their line management, detailing any areas of concern or changes in circumstances that have occurred in the previous year which have yet to be notified to UKSV.

Any issues that require immediate notification to UKSV during the year are either self-reported as a change in circumstances, or if caused by a security issues filed as an "Aftercare Incident Report".

=== Transfer of a clearance ===
A request can be made to transfer national security clearances between organisations, providing they have not expired. Transfers are requested by the "new employing sponsor". Transfers can be the same level of clearance or a lower level clearance can be "extracted" from a higher level clearance (usually SC extracted from DV). No more than twelve months must have elapsed since the holder left the organisation for which the clearance was originally granted and no more than six months spent living overseas. New completed change of circumstances questionnaires, to bring the UKSV and departmental records up to date, may be required. The new sponsor reviews the details of the clearance and decides if it is acceptable for the specific new role.

== Proposed changes ==
In October 2020 a Vetting Transformation Programme was established, designed to improve the performance of security vetting in 2025 by establishing a series of "Levels" and phasing out current nomenclature. The levels were described in detail in 2022. They were:

- Baseline Personnel Security Standard (BPSS), not a formal security clearance level, but BPSS or an equivalent background check is used to underpin all vetting.
- Accreditation Check (AC) = Level 1A
- Counter Terrorist Check (CTC) = Level 1B
- Security Check (SC) = Level 2
- Developed Vetting (DV) = Level 3

The Vetting Transformation Programme was cancelled in 2024 after concerns about cost and the scope of the project; parliament's Public Accounts Committee was informed that the closure was a change of approach, not a lack of commitment to improvement. It was hoped that there would be "discrete incremental improvements" rather than large-scale change.

== Criticism ==
=== Apparent vetting failure: Mandelson and Epstein scandal ===
In February 2026 the security vetting process came into public scrutiny following criticism of prime minister Keir Starmer's decision to appoint Peter Mandelson as ambassador to the United States despite his close and lengthy relationship with Jeffrey Epstein, including, crucially, giving Epstein access to highly-sensitive British government information.

Starmer said in February 2026 that the vetting process needed to be looked at because it transpired that Mandelson had apparently misled officers carrying out developed vetting. In his resignation letter shortly after the scandal developed, the prime minister's chief of staff Morgan McSweeney said that the due diligence and vetting process had to be fundamentally overhauled as a safeguard for the future.

Former UK high commissioner to Trinidad and Tobago Arthur Snell wrote that the vetting process was "limited, flawed, untransparent, incompetent, inadequate and crying out for reform" and that the UK Security Vetting agency within the Cabinet Office was "slow, bureaucratic and ill-equipped". He also wrote that vetting officers could not verify what candidates tell them beyond asking their referees, and that the officer who carried out Mandelson's vetting would have known that they would not be able to deny such a high-profile appointment.

It was reported in mid-April 2026 that the vetting procedure had not fallen short: Mandelson had failed vetting, but Olly Robbins, top civil servant at the Foreign Office, overrode the vetting and granted Mandelson the required top security clearance. It was reported that ministers, including the prime minister, had not been aware of the failed clearance at the time. This led to severe criticism of Starmer, and removal from office of Robbins.

== Other checks ==
=== Disclosure and Barring ===
In addition to national security clearances, other types of roles and organisations stipulate a need for background checks, these are often required for vulnerable group access (including children), as operated by the Disclosure and Barring Service (DBS), replacing former Criminal Records Bureau (CRB) and Independent Safeguarding Authority (ISA) checks.

=== Police Vetting ===
The police service has its own system of vetting:

Force Vetting with a hierarchy of Police Personnel Vetting (PPV) and Non-Police Personnel Vetting (NPPV) levels.

Within this there are several levels. For police officers and police staff, there is:

- Recruitment Vetting; and
- Management Vetting

For contractors and those with access to certain parts of police systems, there is "non-police personnel vetting":

- NPPV Level 1 (NPPV1)
- NPPV Level 2 (NPPV2)
- NPPV Level 3 (NPPV3) (aligned but not equivalent to SC)

When an actual SC, eSC, or DV is required alongside Force Vetting, it is carried out by UKSV.
