= List X site =

A List X site is a commercial site (i.e. non-government) on UK soil that is approved to hold UK government protectively marked information marked as 'Secret' or above, or international partners information classified ‘Confidential’ or above. This changed from 'Confidential and above' with the introduction of the Government Security Classification Scheme. It is applied to a company's specific site (or facility within that site) and not a company as a whole. The term has been used since the 1930s and is equivalent to facility security clearance (FSC) used in other countries.

Locations with this status are those normally involved with defence research and manufacturing that is vital to national security. The complete list of sites is itself classified. The list is administered by Defence Security and Assurance Services (DSAS), part of the Ministry of Defence.

A similar scheme, List N, is used for sites relating to civil nuclear research or power generation, and is administered by the Office for Nuclear Regulation.
