= Head and Shoulders =

Head and Shoulders may refer to:

- Bust (sculpture)
- Head and shoulders (chart pattern), employed in technical analysis, which is a method of stock market prediction
- "Head and Shoulders" (short story), a short story by F. Scott Fitzgerald first published in 1920
- Head & Shoulders, a brand of shampoo by Procter & Gamble
- "Head and Shoulders" a 2015 single by Leftfield featuring Sleaford Mods taken from the album Alternative Light Source

== See also ==
- "Head, Shoulders, Knees and Toes", a children's song
