= Persistent objector =

Concept in international law

In international law, a persistent objector is a sovereign state which has consistently and clearly objected to a norm of customary international law since the norm's emergence, and considers itself not bound to observe the norm. The concept is an example of the positivist doctrine that a state can only be bound by norms to which it has consented.

Objection to the emergence of a norm may come in the form of statements declaring a state's position on an existing right, or action in which a state exercises an existing right in the face of an emerging norm which would threaten that right. Statements made at the time of a rule's establishment, such as in a reservation to a treaty, offer the clearest expression of a state's objection, but objections might also be expressed during treaty negotiations and even in statements by domestic lawmakers accompanying purely municipal legislation.

== Origins ==
The expression Persistent Objector is generally associated with Ian Brownlie's 1966 work, Principles of Public International Law, which presented the concept as an exception to the general rule that customary law binds all states regardless of individual consent. Two decades later in the United States, the American Law Institute's 1987 Third Restatement of the Foreign Relations Law of the United States set out the first comprehensive articulation of the doctrine.

== Requirements ==
A State seeking to rely on the persistent objector must object to the emerging rule during the process of its formation. The objection must be clear, public, and maintained consistently throughout the development of the rule. There is no prescribed form in which the objection is to be made. An objection may be expressed orally or in writing, provided it clearly communicates the state's opposition to the emerging rule. The non-acceptance or intention not to be bound by the rule must be unambiguous. If the state fails to object and the rule becomes crystallized, it cannot claim exemption subsequently. A state that accepts the rule after its formation cannot subsequently claim persistent objector status. Any breach post the crystallization of the rule is treated as an ordinary breach rather than a valid objection. In the case of a state which comes into existence after a rule has already emerged, it is treated as bound by it regardless of its beliefs since it did not exist to object at the relevant time.

These requirements have been formalized in Conclusion 15 of the International Law Commission's 2018 Draft Conclusions. It requires the states to clearly express the objection, make it known to other states, and to keep the objection maintained persistently. As long as the state keeps objecting, the rule will not be applicable to it.

== Recognition in International Law ==
Judicial support for the persistent objector rule is weak. The International Court of Justice has discussed the persistent objector rule in dicta in two cases: the Asylum case (Colombia v Peru, [1950] ICJ 6) and the Fisheries case (United Kingdom v Norway, [1951] ICJ 3). The Inter-American Commission on Human Rights rejected an attempted assertion of the persistent objector defence in Domingues v United States (2002) on the ground that the prohibition against the juvenile death penalty to which the United States objected was not merely customary international law but jus cogens, a norm from which no derogation was permitted. However, this could also be read as confirming that a persistent objector defence may successfully overcome a norm of international human rights law which has not attained the status of jus cogens.

Stronger support for the rule can be found in the writings of certain jurists. The American Law Institute was historically a major contributor to developing a "comprehensive theory" of persistent objection through its 1987 Third Restatement of the Foreign Relations Law of the United States, part of its Restatements of the Law series.

== Scholarly Debate ==
Support for the persistent objector rule as settled, binding customary law, is not unanimous. Advocates have emphasized its doctrinal simplicity and its consistency with the consent-based structure of the International legal system: a state that opposes a rule at every relevant opportunity during its formation is said to obtain a clean and predictable exemption from it once it crystallizes.

Critics, most prominently Patrick Dumberry, have argued that the rule is both legally uncertain and practically ineffective. After surveying state practice, he concluded that there is no clear instance in which a claimed persistent objector status actually prevented a customary rule from being applied to the objecting state once that rule had become well established.

Other scholars have argued that this rule privileges the small set of states with the diplomatic capacity and interest to sustain public objections over long periods, unlike the great majority of states which typically remain passive; and its consistency with the sovereign equality of states has been questioned on the basis that it may effectively allow a small number of powerful, vocal states to depart from otherwise universal rules while binding weaker states which lacked comparable opportunity or incentive to object.

== See Also ==
- Customary international law
- Jus Cogens
- Sources of international law
- Asylum case
- Fisheries case
