= International law =

Norms in international relations

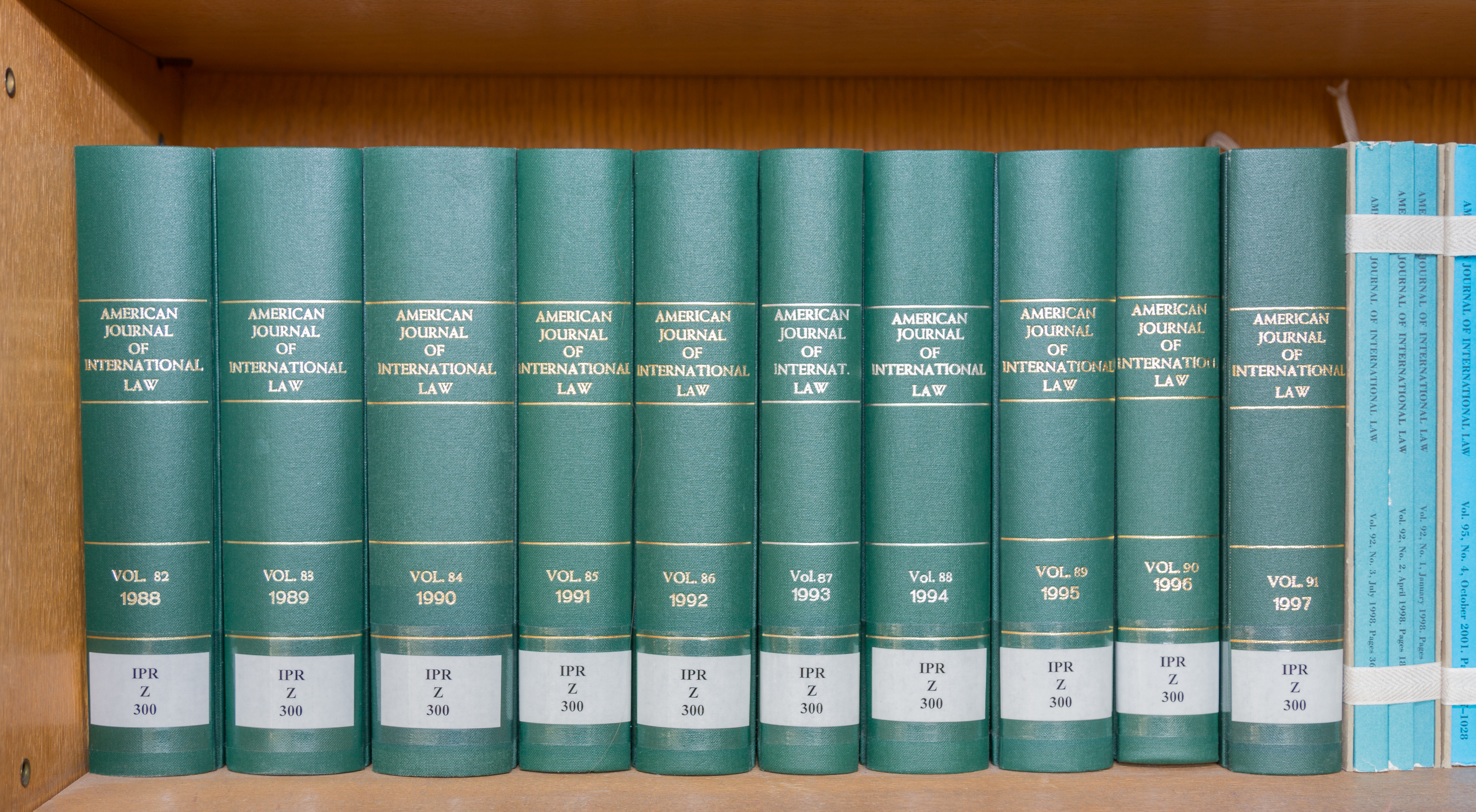
Bound volumes of the American Journal of International Law at the University of Münster in Germany

International law, also known as public international law and the law of nations, is the set of rules, norms, legal customs and standards that states and other actors feel an obligation to, and generally do, obey in their mutual relations. In international relations, actors are simply the individuals and collective entities, such as states, international organizations, and non-state groups, which can make behavioral choices, whether lawful or unlawful. Rules are formal, typically written expectations that outline required behavior, while norms are informal, often unwritten guidelines about appropriate behavior that are shaped by custom and social practice. It establishes norms for states across a broad range of domains, including war and diplomacy, economic relations, and human rights. The term refers to the law that governs not only the conduct of and relations between states, but of international organizations and their relations with states as well.

International law differs from state-based domestic legal systems in that it operates largely through consent, since there is no universally accepted authority to enforce it upon sovereign states. States and non-state actors may choose to not abide by international law, and even to breach a treaty, but such violations, particularly of peremptory norms, can be met with disapproval by others and in some cases coercive action including diplomacy, economic sanctions, and war. The lack of a final authority in international law can also cause far-reaching differences. This is partly the effect of states being able to interpret international law in a manner which they see fit, which can lead to problematic stances that have large local effects.

The sources of international law include international custom (general state practice accepted as law), treaties, and general principles of law recognised by most national legal systems. Although international law may also be reflected in international comity—the practices adopted by states to maintain good relations and mutual recognition—such traditions are not legally binding. Since good relations are more important to maintain with more powerful states, they can influence others more in the matter of what is legal and what is not. This is because they can impose heavier consequences on other states, which gives them a final say. The relationship and interaction between a national legal system and international law is complex and variable. National law may become international law when treaties permit national jurisdiction to supranational tribunals such as the European Court of Human Rights or the International Criminal Court. Treaties such as the Geneva Conventions require national law to conform to treaty provisions. National laws or constitutions may also provide for the implementation or integration of international legal obligations into domestic law.

== Terminology ==
The modern term "international law" was originally coined by Jeremy Bentham in his 1789 book Introduction to the Principles of Morals and Legislation to replace the older law of nations, a direct translation of the late medieval concepts of ius gentium, used by Hugo Grotius, and droits des gens, used by Emer de Vattel. The definition of international law has been debated; Bentham referred specifically to relationships between states which has been criticised for its narrow scope. Lassa Oppenheim defined it in his treatise as "a law between sovereign and equal states based on the common consent of these states" and this definition has been largely adopted by international legal scholars.

There is a distinction between public and private international law; the latter is concerned with whether national courts can claim jurisdiction over cases with a foreign element and the application of foreign judgments in domestic law, whereas public international law covers rules with an international origin. Public international law is the subset of international law that governs the conduct of states and intergovernmental organizations, as well as of some of their relations with (legal) persons. The difference between the two areas of law has been debated as scholars disagree about the nature of their relationship. Joseph Story, who originated the term "private international law," emphasized that it must be governed by the principles of public international law but other academics view them as separate bodies of law. Another term, transnational law, is sometimes used to refer to a body of both national and international rules that transcend the nation state, although some academics emphasize that it is distinct from either type of law. It was defined by Philip Jessup as "all law which regulates actions or events that transcend national frontiers".

A more recent concept is supranational law, which was described in a 1969 paper as "[a] relatively new word in the vocabulary of politics". Systems of supranational law arise when nations explicitly cede their right to make decisions to this system's judiciary and legislature, which then have the right to make laws that are directly effective in each member state. This has been described as "a level of international integration beyond mere intergovernmentalism yet still short of a federal system". The most common example of a supranational system is the European Union.

== History ==
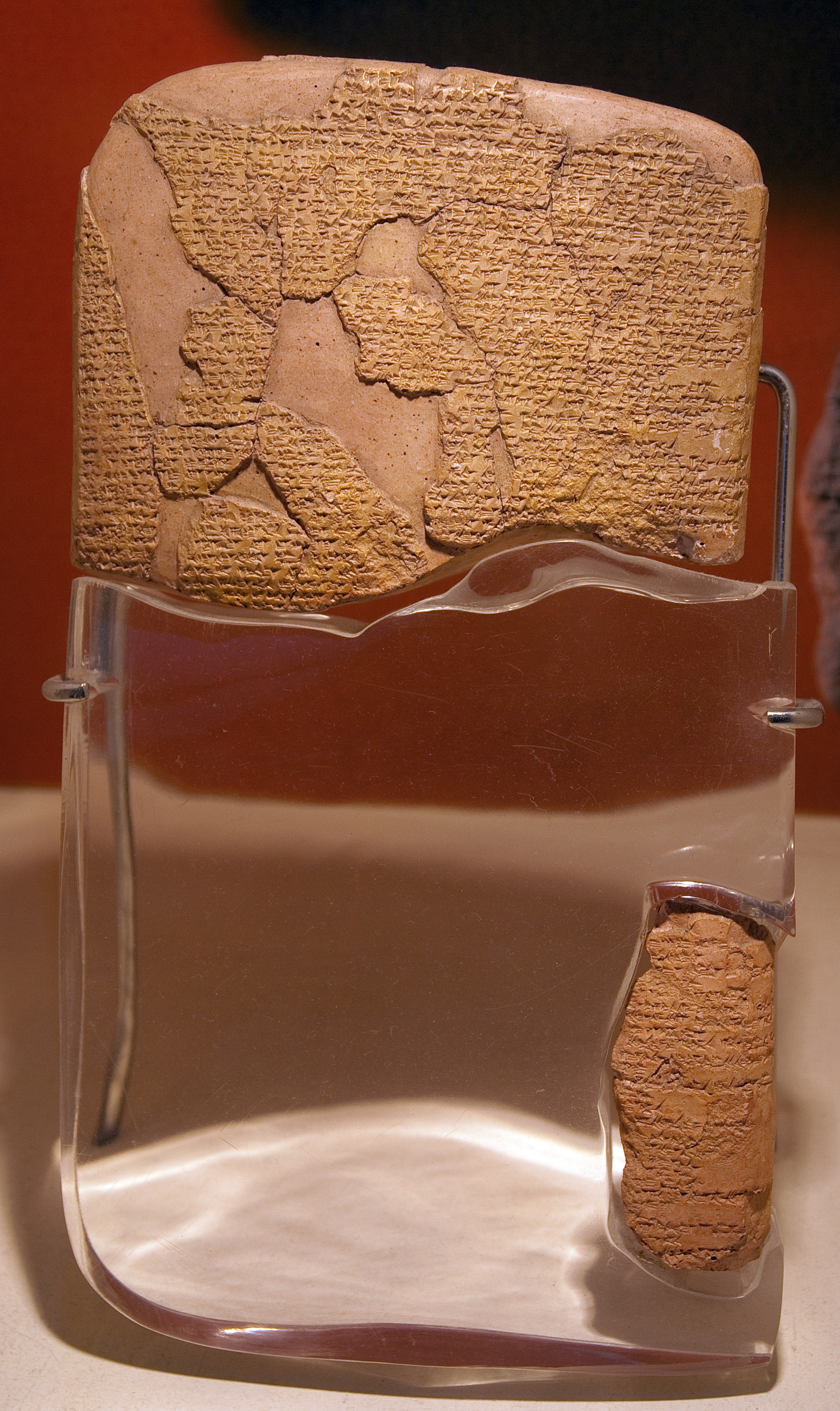
The Hittite version of the Treaty of Kadesh, among the earliest extant examples of an international agreement

=== Antiquity ===
With origins tracing back to antiquity, states have a long history of negotiating interstate agreements. An initial framework was conceptualised by the Ancient Romans and this idea of ius gentium has been used by various academics to establish the modern concept of international law. Among the earliest recorded examples are peace treaties between the Mesopotamian city-states of Lagash and Umma (approximately 3100 BCE), and an agreement between the Egyptian pharaoh, Ramesses II, and the Hittite king, Ḫattušili III, concluded in 1279 BCE. Interstate pacts and agreements were negotiated and agreed upon by polities across the world, from the eastern Mediterranean to East Asia. In Ancient Greece, many early peace treaties were negotiated between its city-states and, occasionally, with neighbouring states. The Roman Empire established an early conceptual framework for international law, jus gentium, which governed the status of foreigners living in Rome and relations between foreigners and Roman citizens. Adopting the Greek concept of natural law, the Romans conceived of jus gentium as being universal. However, in contrast to modern international law, the Roman law of nations applied to relations with and between foreign individuals rather than among political units such as states.

Beginning with the Spring and Autumn period of the eighth century BCE, China was divided into numerous states that were often at war with each other. Rules for diplomacy and treaty-making emerged, including notions regarding just grounds for war, the rights of neutral parties, and the consolidation and partition of states; these concepts were sometimes applied to relations with barbarians along China's western periphery beyond the Central Plains. The subsequent Warring States period saw the development of two major schools of thought, Confucianism and Legalism, both of which held that the domestic and international legal spheres were closely interlinked, and sought to establish competing normative principles to guide foreign relations. Similarly, the Indian subcontinent was divided into various states, which over time developed rules of neutrality, treaty law, and international conduct, and established both temporary and permanent embassies.

=== Middle Ages ===
Following the fall of the Western Roman Empire in the fifth century CE, Europe fragmented into numerous often-warring states for much of the next five centuries. Political power was dispersed across a range of entities, including the Church, mercantile city-states, and kingdoms, most of which had overlapping and ever-changing jurisdictions. As in China and India, these divisions prompted the development of rules aimed at providing stable and predictable relations. Early examples include canon law, which governed ecclesiastical institutions and clergy throughout Europe; the lex mercatoria ("merchant law"), which concerned trade and commerce; and various codes of maritime law, such as the Rolls of Oléron — aimed at regulating shipping in North-western Europe — and the later Laws of Wisby, enacted among the commercial Hanseatic League of northern Europe and the Baltic region.

In the Islamic world, Muhammad al-Shaybani published Al-Siyar Al-Kabīr in the eighth century, which served as a fundamental reference work for siyar, a subset of Sharia law, which governed foreign relations. This was based on the division of the world into three categories: the dar al-Islam, where Islamic law prevailed; the dar al-sulh, non-Islamic realms that concluded an armistice with a Muslim government; and the dar al-harb, non-Islamic lands which were contested through jihad. Islamic legal principles concerning military conduct served as precursors to modern international humanitarian law and institutionalised limitations on military conduct, including guidelines for commencing war, distinguishing between civilians and combatants and caring for the sick and wounded.

During the European Middle Ages, international law was concerned primarily with the purpose and legitimacy of war, seeking to determine what constituted "just war". The Greco-Roman concept of natural law was combined with religious principles by Jewish philosopher Maimonides (1135–1204) and Christian theologian Thomas Aquinas (1225–1274) to create the new discipline of the "law of nations", which unlike its eponymous Roman predecessor, applied natural law to relations between states. In Islam, a similar framework was developed wherein the law of nations was derived, in part, from the principles and rules set forth in treaties with non-Muslims.

=== Renaissance and emergence of modern international law ===
The 16th century witnessed a confluence of factors that contributed to an accelerated development of international law. Italian jurist Bartolus de Saxoferrato (1313–1357) was considered the founder of private international law. Another Italian jurist, Baldus de Ubaldis (1327–1400), was widely regarded in his own era as an authority on the Corpus Juris Civilis, Justinian I's sixth-century compilation of Roman law that later formed the foundation of Roman law instruction at medieval universities; through his lectures, he provided commentaries and compilations of Roman, ecclesiastical, and feudal law. Francisco de Vitoria (1486–1546), who was concerned with the treatment of indigenous peoples by Spain, invoked the law of nations as a basis for their innate dignity and rights, articulating an early version of sovereign equality between peoples. For his extensive and seminal work on the topic, he has been called the originator of modern international law. Francisco Suárez (1548–1617), from the School of Salamanca founded by Vitoria, emphasized that international law was founded upon natural law and human positive law. Alberico Gentili (1552–1608) took a secular view to international law, authoring various books on issues in international law, notably Law of War, which provided comprehensive commentary on the laws of war and treaties.

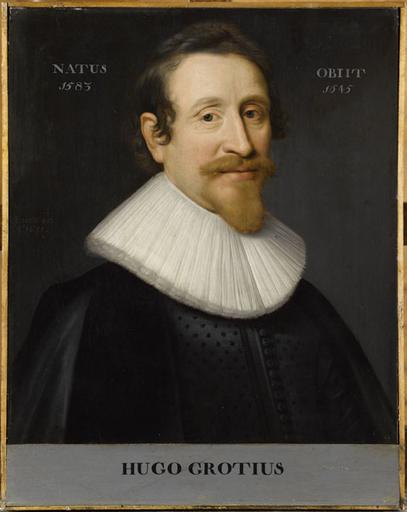
A portrait of Dutch jurist Hugo Grotius

Dutch jurist Hugo Grotius (1583–1645) is widely regarded as the father of international law, being one of the first scholars to articulate an international order that consists of a "society of states" governed not by force or warfare but by actual laws, mutual agreements, and customs. Grotius secularised international law; his 1625 work, De Jure Belli ac Pacis, laid down a system of principles of natural law that bind all nations regardless of local custom or law. He inspired two nascent schools of international law, the naturalists and the positivists. In the former camp was German jurist Samuel von Pufendorf (1632–1694), who stressed the supremacy of the law of nature over states. His 1672 work, Of the Law of Nature and Nations, expanded on the theories of Grotius and grounded natural law to reason and the secular world, asserting that it regulated only external acts of states. Pufendorf challenged the Hobbesian notion that the state of nature was one of war and conflict, arguing that the natural state of the world is actually peaceful but weak and uncertain without adherence to the law of nations. The actions of a state consist of nothing more than the sum of the individuals within that state, thereby requiring the state to apply a fundamental law of reason, which is the basis of natural law. He was among the earliest scholars to expand international law beyond European Christian nations, advocating for its application and recognition among all peoples on the basis of shared humanity.

In contrast, positivist writers, such as Richard Zouche (1590–1661) in England and Cornelis van Bynkershoek (1673–1743) in the Netherlands, argued that international law should derive from the actual practice of states rather than Christian or Greco-Roman sources. The study of international law shifted away from its core concern on the law of war and towards the domains such as the law of the sea and commercial treaties. The positivist school grew more popular as it reflected accepted views of state sovereignty and was consistent with the empiricist approach to philosophy that was then gaining acceptance in Europe.

=== Establishment of Westphalian system ===
The developments of the 17th century culminated at the conclusion of the Peace of Westphalia in 1648, which is considered the seminal event in international law. The resulting Westphalian sovereignty is said to have established the current international legal order characterised by independent nation states, which have equal sovereignty regardless of their size and power, defined primarily by non-interference in the domestic affairs of sovereign states, although historians have challenged this narrative. The idea of nationalism further solidified the concept and formation of nation-states. Elements of the naturalist and positivist schools were synthesized, notably by German philosopher Christian Wolff (1679–1754) and Swiss jurist Emer de Vattel (1714–1767), both of whom sought a middle-ground approach.

One of the first instruments of modern armed conflict law was the Lieber Code of 1863, which governed the conduct of warfare during the American Civil War, and is noted for codifying rules and articles of war adhered to by nations across the world, including the United Kingdom, Prussia, Serbia and Argentina. In the years that followed, numerous other treaties and bodies were created to regulate the conduct of states towards one another, including the Permanent Court of Arbitration in 1899, and the Hague and Geneva Conventions, the first of which was passed in 1864.

=== 20th and 21st century developments ===
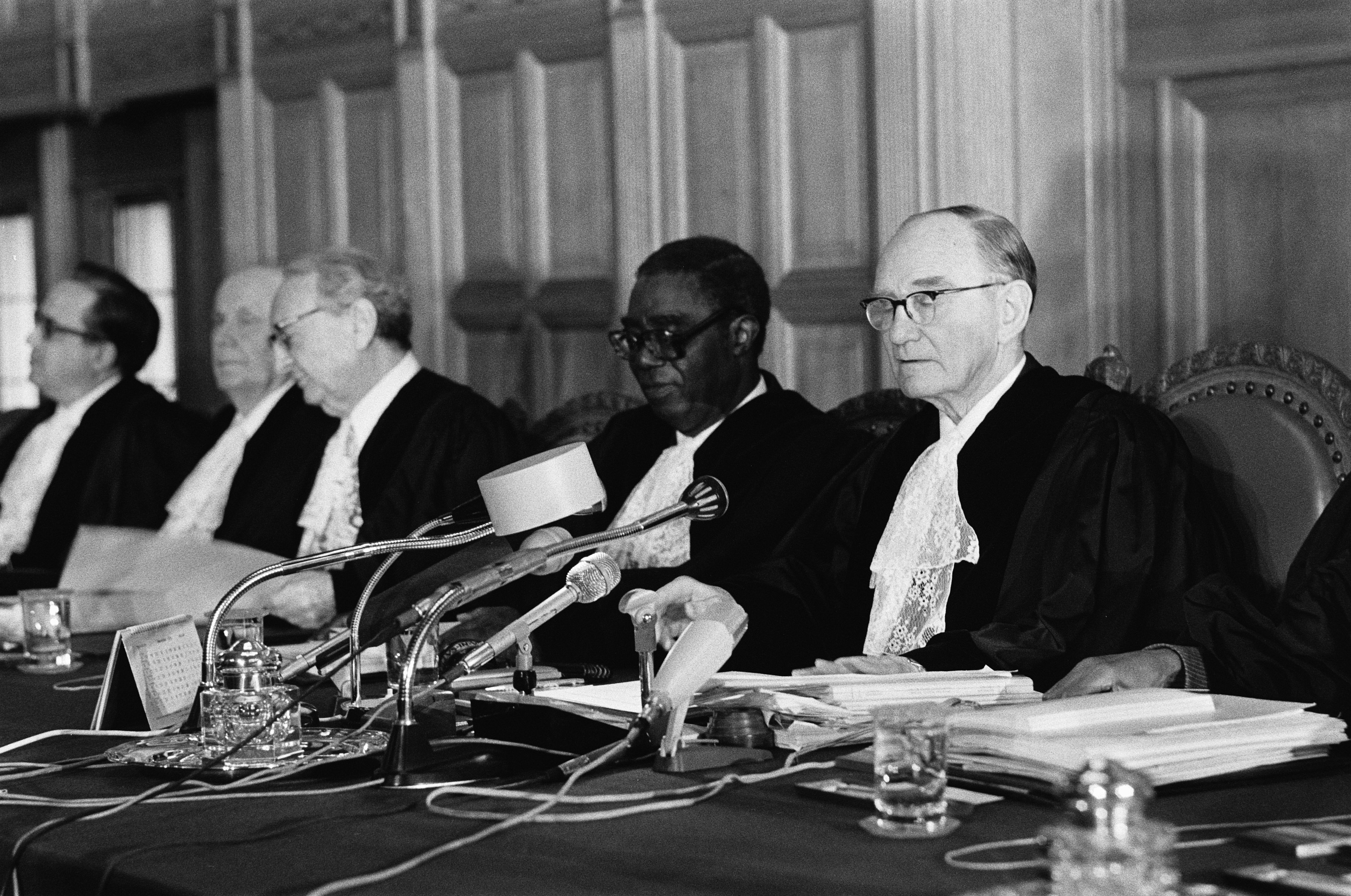
Justices of the International Court of Justice in 1979

Colonial expansion by European powers reached its peak in the late 19th century and its influence began to wane following the unprecedented bloodshed of World War I, which spurred the creation of international organisations. Right of conquest was generally recognized as international law before World War II. The League of Nations was founded to safeguard peace and security. International law began to incorporate notions such as self-determination and human rights. The United Nations (UN) was established in 1945 to replace the League, with an aim of maintaining collective security. A more robust international legal order followed, buttressed by institutions such as the International Court of Justice (ICJ) and the UN Security Council (UNSC). The International Law Commission (ILC) was established in 1947 to develop and codify international law.

In the 1940s through the 1970s, the dissolution of the Soviet bloc and decolonisation across the world resulted in the establishment of scores of newly independent states. As these former colonies became their own states, they adopted European views of international law. A flurry of institutions, ranging from the International Monetary Fund (IMF) and the International Bank for Reconstruction and Development (World Bank) to the World Health Organization furthered the development of a multilateralist approach as states chose to compromise on sovereignty to benefit from international cooperation. Since the 1980s, there has been an increasing focus on the phenomenon of globalization and on protecting human rights on the global scale, particularly when minorities or indigenous communities are involved, as concerns are raised that globalisation may be increasing inequality in the international legal system.

== Sources of international law ==
The sources of international law applied by the community of nations are listed in Article 38(1) of the Statute of the International Court of Justice, which is considered authoritative in this regard. These categories are, in order, international treaties, customary international law, general principles of law, and judicial decisions and the teachings of prominent legal scholars as "a subsidiary means for the determination of rules of law". The three primary ways that international law is created is through treaties, custom, and general principles of law. It was originally considered that the arrangement of the sources sequentially would suggest an implicit hierarchy of sources; however, the statute does not provide for a hierarchy and other academics have argued that therefore the sources must be equivalent.

General principles of law have been defined in the Statute as "general principles of law recognized by civilized nations" but there is no academic consensus about what is included within this scope. They are considered to be derived from both national and international legal systems, although including the latter category has led to debate about potential cross-over with international customary law. The relationship of general principles to treaties or custom has generally been considered to be "fill[ing] the gaps" although there is still no conclusion about their exact relationship in the absence of a hierarchy.

=== Treaties ===
Parties and signatories to the Vienna Convention on the Law of Treaties: Parties Signatories Non-parties

A treaty is defined in Article 2 of the Vienna Convention on the Law of Treaties (VCLT) as "an international agreement concluded between States in written form and governed by international law, whether embodied in a single instrument or in two or more related instruments and whatever its particular designation". The definition specifies that the parties must be states, however international organizations are also considered to have the capacity to enter treaties. Treaties are binding through the principle of pacta sunt servanda, which allows states to create legal obligations on themselves through consent. The treaty must be governed by international law; however it will likely be interpreted by national courts. The VCLT, which codifies several bedrock principles of treaty interpretation, holds that a treaty "shall be interpreted in good faith in accordance with the ordinary meaning to be given to the terms of the treaty in their context and in the light of its object and purpose". This represents a compromise between three theories of interpretation: the textual approach which looks to the ordinary meaning of the text, the subjective approach which considers factors such as the drafters' intention, and the teleological approach which interprets a treaty according to its objective and purpose.

A state must express its consent to be bound by a treaty through signature, exchange of instruments, ratification, acceptance, approval or accession. Accession refers to a state choosing to become party to a treaty that it is unable to sign, such as when establishing a regional body. Where a treaty states that it will be enacted through ratification, acceptance or approval, the parties must sign to indicate acceptance of the wording but there is no requirement on a state to later ratify the treaty, although they may still be subject to certain obligations. When signing or ratifying a treaty, a state can make a unilateral statement to negate or amend certain legal provisions which can have one of three effects: the reserving state is bound by the treaty but the effects of the relevant provisions are precluded or changes, the reserving state is bound by the treaty but not the relevant provisions, or the reserving state is not bound by the treaty. An interpretive declaration is a separate process, where a state issues a unilateral statement to specify or clarify a treaty provision. This can affect the interpretation of the treaty but it is generally not legally binding. A state is also able to issue a conditional declaration stating that it will consent to a given treaty only on the condition of a particular provision or interpretation.

Article 54 of the VCLT provides that either party may terminate or withdraw from a treaty in accordance with its terms or at any time with the consent of the other party, with 'termination' applying to a bilateral treaty and 'withdrawal' applying to a multilateral treaty. Where a treaty does not have provisions allowing for termination or withdrawal, such as the Genocide Convention, it is prohibited unless the right was implied into the treaty or the parties had intended to allow for it. A treaty can also be held invalid, including where parties act ultra vires or negligently, where execution has been obtained through fraudulent, corrupt or forceful means, or where the treaty contradicts peremptory norms.

=== Custom ===
Customary international law requires two elements: a consistent practice of states and the conviction of those states that the consistent practice is required by a legal obligation, referred to as opinio juris. Custom distinguishes itself from treaty law as it is binding on all states, regardless of whether they have participated in the practice, with the exception of states who have been persistent objectors during the process of the custom being formed and special or local forms of customary law. The requirement for state practice relates to the practice, either through action or failure to act, of states in relation to other states or international organisations. There is no legal requirement for state practice to be uniform or for the practice to be long-running, although the ICJ has set a high bar for enforcement in the cases of Anglo-Norwegian Fisheries and North Sea Continental Shelf. There has been legal debate on this topic with the only prominent view on the length of time necessary to establish custom explained by Humphrey Waldock as varying "according to the nature of the case". The practice is not required to be followed universally by states, but there must be a "general recognition" by states "whose interests are specially affected".

The second element of the test, opinio juris, the belief of a party that a particular action is required by the law is referred to as the subjective element. The ICJ has stated in dictum in North Sea Continental Shelf that, "Not only must the acts concerned amount to a settled practice, but they must also be such, or be carried out in such a way, as to be evidence of a belief that this practice is rendered obligatory by the existence of a rule of law requiring it". A committee of the International Law Association has argued that there is a general presumption of an opinio juris where state practice is proven but it may be necessary if the practice suggests that the states did not believe it was creating a precedent. The test in these circumstances is whether opinio juris can be proven by the states' failure to protest. Other academics believe that intention to create customary law can be shown by states including the principle in multiple bilateral and multilateral treaties, so that treaty law is necessary to form customs.

The adoption of the VCLT in 1969 established the concept of jus cogens, or peremptory norms, which are "a norm accepted and recognized by the international community of States as a whole as a norm from which no derogation is permitted and which can be modified only by a subsequent norm of general international law having the same character". Where customary or treaty law conflicts with a peremptory norm, it will be considered invalid, but there is no agreed definition of jus cogens. Academics have debated what principles are considered peremptory norms but the mostly widely agreed is the principle of non-use of force. The next year, the ICJ defined erga omnes obligations as those owed to "the international community as a whole", which included the illegality of genocide and human rights.

== Relationship to national laws ==
There are generally two approaches to the relationship between international and national law, namely monism and dualism. Monism assumes that international and national law are part of the same legal order. Therefore, a treaty can directly become part of national law without the need for enacting legislation, although they will generally need to be approved by the legislature. Once approved, the content of the treaty is considered as a law that has a higher status than national laws. Examples of countries with a monism approach are France and the Netherlands. The dualism approach considers that national and international law are two separate legal orders, so treaties are not granted a special status. The rules in a treaty can only be considered national law if the contents of the treaty have been enacted first. An example is the United Kingdom; after the country ratified the European Convention on Human Rights, the convention was only considered to have the force of law in national law after Parliament passed the Human Rights Act 1998.

In practice, the division of countries between monism and dualism is often more complicated; countries following both approaches may accept peremptory norms as being automatically binding and they may approach treaties, particularly later amendments or clarifications, differently than they would approach customary law. Many countries with older or unwritten constitutions do not have explicit provision for international law in their domestic system and there has been an upswing in support for monism principles in relation to human rights and humanitarian law, as most principles governing these concepts can be found in international law.

== International actors ==
Among the international actors, only certain ones are considered subjects of international law. Before the 20th century, states were considered the only subjects of international law, with rare exceptions. Since then, international organizations have become accepted as subjects, as affirmed by the International Court of Justice in its opinion Reparations for injuries case. Non-state actors such as dependent territories, belligerent groups, and even individuals, companies, and non-governmental organizations can be considered entities with international rights and duties under international law, though not full subjects.

=== States ===
A state is defined under Article 1 of the Montevideo Convention on the Rights and Duties of States as a legal person with a permanent population, a defined territory, government and capacity to enter relations with other states. There is no requirement on population size, allowing micro-states such as San Marino and Monaco to be admitted to the UN, and no requirement of fully defined boundaries, allowing Israel to be admitted despite border disputes. There was originally an intention that a state must have self-determination, but now the requirement is for a stable political environment. The final requirement of being able to enter relations is commonly evidenced by independence and sovereignty.

UN member states that at least one other member state does not recognise Non-UN member states recognised by at least one UN member state Non-UN member states recognised only by other non-UN member states

Under the principle of par in parem non habet imperium, all states are sovereign and equal, but state recognition often plays a significant role in political conceptions. A country may recognize another nation as a state and, separately, it may recognize that nation's government as being legitimate and capable of representing the state on the international stage. There are two theories on recognition; the declaratory theory sees recognition as commenting on a current state of law which has been separately satisfied whereas the constitutive theory states that recognition by other states determines whether a state can be considered to have legal personality. States can be recognized explicitly through a released statement or tacitly through conducting official relations, although some countries have formally interacted without conferring recognition.

Throughout the 19th century and the majority of the 20th century, states were protected by absolute immunity, so they could not face criminal prosecution for any actions. However a number of countries began to distinguish between acta jure gestionis, commercial actions, and acta jure imperii, government actions; the restrictive theory of immunity said states were immune where they were acting in a governmental capacity but not a commercial one. The European Convention on State Immunity in 1972 and the UN Convention on Jurisdictional Immunities of States and their Property attempt to restrict immunity in accordance with customary law.

=== Individuals ===
Historically individuals have not been seen as entities in international law, as the focus was on the relationship between states. As human rights have become more important on the global stage, being codified by the UN General Assembly (UNGA) in the Universal Declaration of Human Rights in 1948, individuals have been given the power to defend their rights to judicial bodies. International law is largely silent on the issue of nationality law with the exception of cases of dual nationality or where someone is claiming rights under refugee law but as, argued by the political theorist Hannah Arendt, human rights are often tied to someone's nationality. The European Court of Human Rights allows individuals to petition the court where their rights have been violated and national courts have not intervened and the Inter-American Court of Human Rights and the African Court on Human and Peoples' Rights have similar powers.

=== International organisations ===
Traditionally, sovereign states and the Holy See were the sole subjects of international law. With the proliferation of international organisations over the last century, they have also been recognised as relevant parties. One definition of international organisations comes from the ILC's 2011 Draft Articles on the Responsibility of International Organizations which in Article 2(a) states that it is "an organization established by treaty or other instrument governed by international law and possessing its own international legal personality". This definition functions as a starting point but does not recognise that organisations can have no separate personality but nevertheless function as an international organisation. The UN Economic and Social Council has emphasised a split between inter-government organisations (IGOs), which are created by inter-governmental agreements, and international non-governmental organisations (INGOs). All international organisations have members; generally this is restricted to states, although it can include other international organisations. Sometimes non-members will be allowed to participate in meetings as observers.

The Yearbook of International Organizations sets out a list of international organisations, which include the UN, the WTO, the World Bank and the IMF. Generally organisations consist of a plenary organ, where member states can be represented and heard; an executive organ, to decide matters within the competence of the organisation; and an administrative organ, to execute the decisions of the other organs and handle secretarial duties. International organisations will typically provide for their privileges and immunity in relation to its member states in their constitutional documents or in multilateral agreements, such as the Convention on the Privileges and Immunities of the United Nations. These organisations also have the power to enter treaties, using the Vienna Convention on the Law of Treaties between States and International Organizations or between International Organizations as a basis although it is not yet in force. They may also have the right to bring legal claims against states depending, as set out in Reparation for Injuries, where they have legal personality and the right to do so in their constitution.

==== United Nations ====
The UNSC has the power under Chapter VII of the UN Charter to take decisive and binding actions against states committing "a threat to the peace, breach of the peace, or an act of aggression" for collective security although prior to 1990, it has only intervened once, in the case of Korea in 1950. This power can only be exercised, however, where a majority of member states vote for it, as well as receiving the support of the permanent five members of the UNSC. This can be followed up with economic sanctions, military action, and similar uses of force. The UNSC also has a wide discretion under Article 24, which grants "primary responsibility" for issues of international peace and security. The UNGA, concerned during the Cold War with the requirement that the USSR would have to authorise any UNSC action, adopted the "Uniting for Peace" resolution of 3 November 1950, which allowed the organ to pass recommendations to authorize the use of force. This resolution also led to the practice of UN peacekeeping, which has been notably been used in East Timor and Kosovo.

==== International courts ====
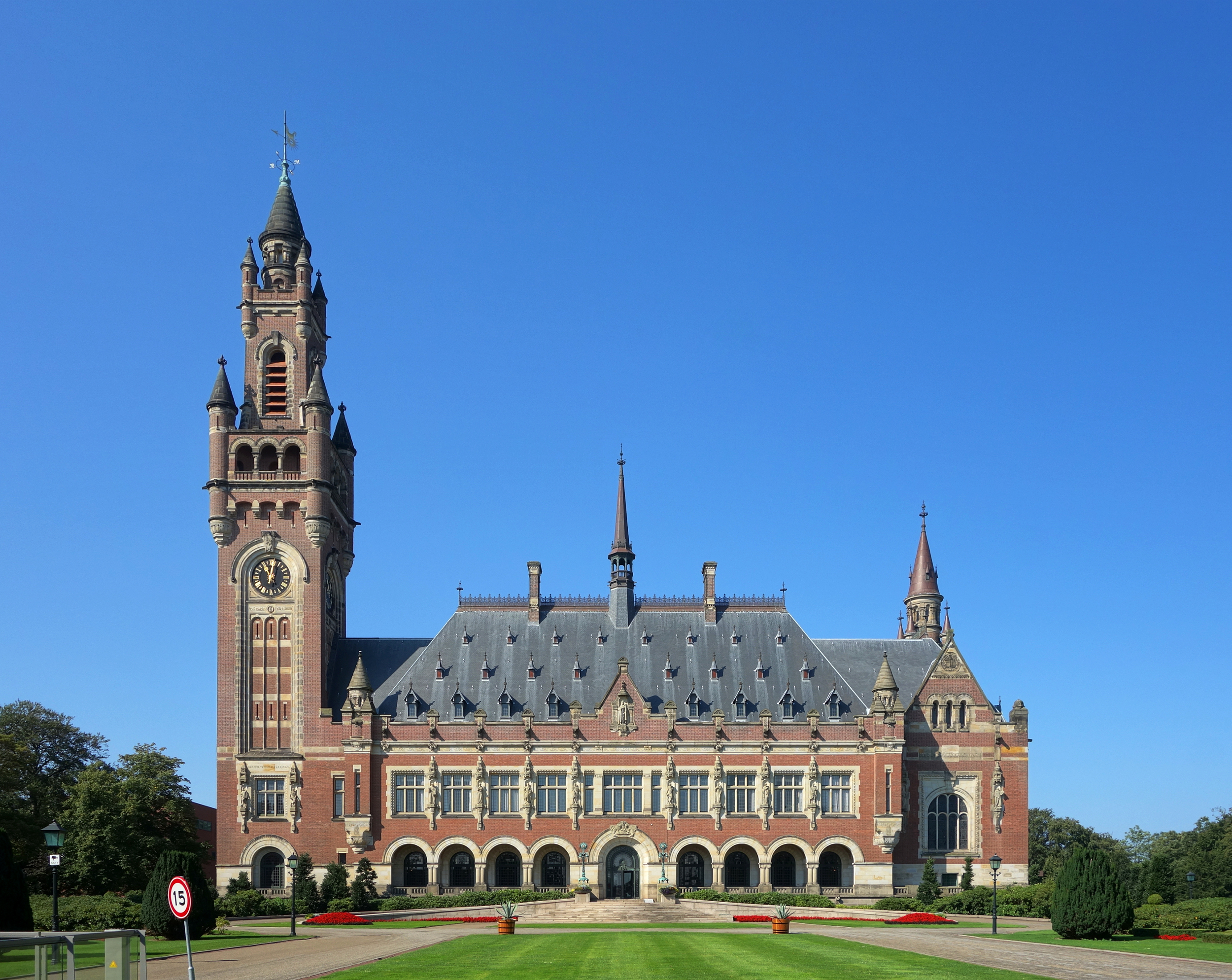
The Peace Palace in the Hague, which houses the International Court of Justice

There are more than one hundred international courts in the global community, although states have generally been reluctant to allow their sovereignty to be limited in this way. The first known international court was the Central American Court of Justice, prior to World War I, when the Permanent Court of International Justice (PCIJ) was established. The PCIJ was replaced by the ICJ, which is the best known international court due to its universal scope in relation to geographical jurisdiction and subject matter. There are additionally a number of regional courts, including the Court of Justice of the European Union, the EFTA Court and the Court of Justice of the Andean Community. Interstate arbitration can also be used to resolve disputes between states, leading in 1899 to the creation of the Permanent Court of Arbitration which facilitates the process by maintaining a list of arbitrators. This process was used in the Island of Palmas Case and to resolve disputes during the Eritrean-Ethiopian war.

The ICJ operates as one of the six organs of the UN, based out of the Hague with a panel of fifteen permanent judges. It has jurisdiction to hear cases involving states but cannot get involved in disputes involving individuals or international organizations. The states that can bring cases must be party to the Statute of the ICJ, although in practice most states are UN members and would therefore be eligible. The court has jurisdiction over all cases that are referred to it and all matters specifically referred to in the UN Charter or international treaties, although in practice there are no relevant matters in the UN Charter. The ICJ may also be asked by an international organisation to provide an advisory opinion on a legal question, which are generally considered non-binding but authoritative.

== Social and economic policy ==
=== Conflict of laws ===
Conflict of laws, also known as private international law, was originally concerned with choice of law, determining which nation's laws should govern a particular legal circumstance. Historically the comity theory has been used although the definition is unclear, sometimes referring to reciprocity and sometimes being used as a synonym for private international law. Story distinguished it from "any absolute paramount obligation, superseding all discretion on the subject". There are three aspects to conflict of laws – determining which domestic court has jurisdiction over a dispute, determining if a domestic court has jurisdiction and determining whether foreign judgments can be enforced. The first question relates to whether the domestic court or a foreign court is best placed to decide the case. When determining the national law that should apply, the lex causae is the law that has been chosen to govern the case, which is generally foreign, and the lexi fori is the national law of the court making the determination. Some examples are lex domicilii, the law of the domicile, and les patriae, the law of the nationality.

The rules which are applied to conflict of laws will vary depending on the national system determining the question. There have been attempts to codify an international standard to unify the rules so differences in national law cannot lead to inconsistencies, such as through the Hague Convention on the Recognition and Enforcement of Foreign Judgments in Civil and Commercial Matters and the Brussels Regulations. These treaties codified practice on the enforcement of international judgments, stating that a foreign judgment would be automatically recognised and enforceable where required in the jurisdiction where the party resides, unless the judgement was contrary to public order or conflicted with a local judgment between the same parties. On a global level, the New York Convention on the Recognition and Enforcement of Foreign Arbitral Awards was introduced in 1958 to internationalise the enforcement of arbitral awards, although it does not have jurisdiction over court judgments.

A state must prove that it has jurisdiction before it can exercise its legal authority. This concept can be divided between prescriptive jurisdiction, which is the authority of a legislature to enact legislation on a particular issue, and adjudicative jurisdiction, which is the authority of a court to hear a particular case. This aspect of private international law should first be resolved by reference to domestic law, which may incorporate international treaties or other supranational legal concepts, although there are consistent international norms. There are five forms of jurisdiction which are consistently recognised in international law; an individual or act can be subject to multiple forms of jurisdiction. The first is the territorial principle, which states that a nation has jurisdiction over actions which occur within its territorial boundaries. The second is the nationality principle, also known as the active personality principle, whereby a nation has jurisdiction over actions committed by its nationals regardless of where they occur. The third is the passive personality principle, which gives a country jurisdiction over any actions which harm its nationals. The fourth is the protective principle, where a nation has jurisdiction in relation to threats to its "fundamental national interests". The final form is universal jurisdiction, where a country has jurisdiction over certain acts based on the nature of the crime itself.

=== Human rights ===
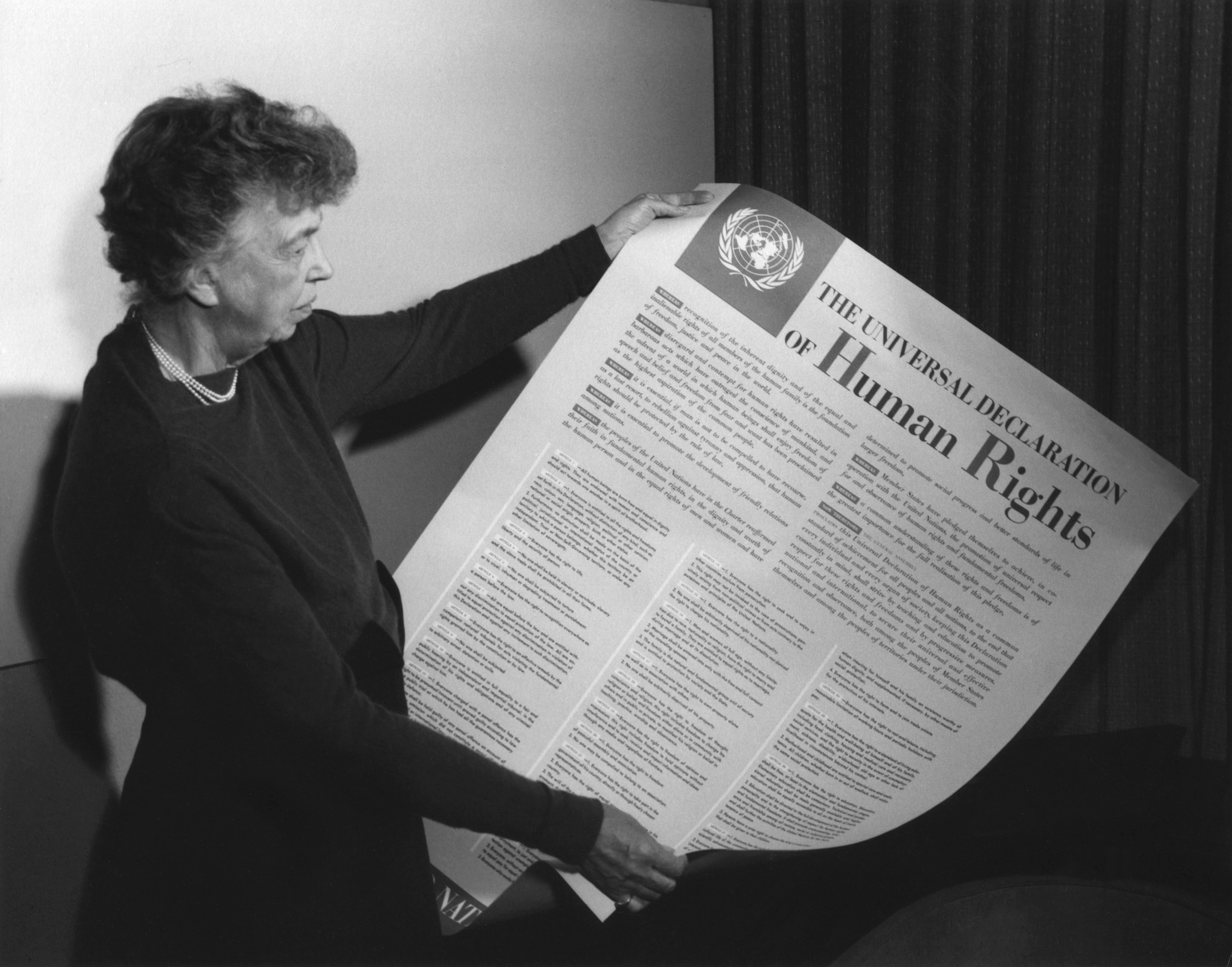
US ambassador to the UN, Eleanor Roosevelt, holding the Universal Declaration of Human Rights in 1949

Following World War II, the modern system for international human rights was developed to make states responsible for their human rights violations. The UN Economic and Security Council established the UN Commission on Human Rights in 1946, which developed the Universal Declaration of Human Rights (UDHR), which established non-binding international human rights standards, for work, standards of living, housing and education, non-discrimination, a fair trial and prohibition of torture. Two further human rights treaties were adopted by the UN in 1966, the International Covenant on Civil and Political Rights (ICCPR) and the International Covenant on Economic, Social and Cultural Rights (ICESCR). These two documents along with the UDHR are considered the International Bill of Human Rights.

Non-domestic human rights enforcement operates at both the international and regional levels. Established in 1993, the Office of the UN High Commissioner for Human Rights supervises Charter-based and treaty-based procedures. The former are based on the UN Charter and operate under the UN Human Rights Council, where each global region is represented by elected member states. The Council is responsible for Universal Periodic Review, which requires each UN member state to review its human rights compliance every four years, and for special procedures, including the appointment of special rapporteurs, independent experts and working groups. The treaty-based procedure allows individuals to rely on the nine primary human rights treaties:

- International Convention on the Elimination of All Forms of Racial Discrimination
- ICCPR
- ICESCR
- Convention on the Elimination of All forms of Discrimination against Women
- Convention against Torture and Other Cruel, Inhuman or Degrading Treatment or Punishment
- Convention on the Rights of the Child
- International Convention on the Protection of the Rights of All Migrant Workers and Members of Their Families
- Convention on the Rights of Persons with Disabilities
- International Convention for the Protection of All Persons from Enforced Disappearance – to enforce their rights

The regional human rights enforcement systems operate in Europe, Africa and the Americas through the European Court of Human Rights, the Inter-American Court of Human Rights and the African Court on Human and Peoples' Rights. International human rights has faced criticism for its Western focus, as many countries were subject to colonial rule at the time that the UDHR was drafted, although many countries in the Global South have led the development of human rights on the global stage in the intervening decades.

=== Labour law ===
International labour law is generally defined as "the substantive rules of law established at the international level and the procedural rules relating to their adoption and implementation". It operates primarily through the International Labor Organization (ILO), a UN agency with the mission of protecting employment rights which was established in 1919. The ILO has a constitution setting out a number of aims, including regulating work hours and labour supply, protecting workers and children and recognising equal pay and the right to free association, as well as the Declaration of Philadelphia of 1944, which redefined the purpose of the ILO. The 1998 Declaration on Fundamental Principles and Rights at Work further binds ILO member states to recognise fundamental labour rights including free association, collective bargaining and eliminating forced labour, child labour and employment discrimination.

The ILO have also created labour standards which are set out in their conventions and recommendations. Member states then have the choice as to whether or not to ratify and implement these standards. The secretariat of the ILO is the International Labour Office, which can be consulted by states to determine the meaning of a convention, which forms the ILO's case law. Although the Right to Organise Convention does not provide an explicit right to strike, this has been interpreted into the treaty through case law. The UN does not specifically focus on international labour law, although some of its treaties cover the same topics. Many of the primary human rights conventions also form part of international labour law, providing protection in employment and against discrimination on the grounds of gender and race.

=== Environmental law ===
It has been claimed that there is no concept of discrete international environmental law, with the general principles of international law instead being applied to these issues. Since the 1960s, a number of treaties focused on environmental protection were ratified, including the Declaration of the United Nations Conference on the Human Environment of 1972, the World Charter for Nature of 1982, and the Vienna Convention for the Protection of the Ozone Layer of 1985. States generally agreed to co-operate with each other in relation to environmental law, as codified by principle 24 of the Rio Declaration of 1972. Despite these, and other, multilateral environmental agreements covering specific issues, there is no overarching policy on international environmental protection or one specific international organisation, with the exception of the UN Environmental Programme. Instead, a general treaty setting out the framework for tackling an issue has then been supplemented by more specific protocols.

Scenarios of global greenhouse gas emissions as of April 2022

Climate change has been one of the most important and heavily debated topics in recent environmental law. The United Nations Framework Convention on Climate Change, intended to set out a framework for the mitigation of greenhouse gases and responses to resulting environmental changes, was introduced in 1992 and came into force two years later. As of 2023, 198 states were a party. Separate protocols have been introduced through conferences of the parties, including the Kyoto Protocol which was introduced in 1997 to set specific targets for greenhouse gas reduction and the 2015 Paris Agreement which set the goal of keeping global warming at least below 2 °C (3.6 °F) above pre-industrial levels.

Individuals and organisations have some rights under international environmental law as the Aarhus Convention in 1998 set obligations on states to provide information and allow public input on these issues. However few disputes under the regimes set out in environmental agreements are referred to the ICJ, as the agreements tend to specify their compliance procedures. These procedures generally focus on encouraging the state to once again become compliant through recommendations but there is still uncertainty on how these procedures should operate and efforts have been made to regulate these processes although some worry that this will undercut the efficiency of the procedures themselves.

=== Territory and the sea ===
Legal territory can be divided into four categories. There is territorial sovereignty which covers land and territorial sea, including the airspace above it and the subsoil below it, territory outside the sovereignty of any state, res nullius which is not yet within territorial sovereignty but is territory that is legally capable of being acquired by a state and res communis which is territory that cannot be acquired by a state. There have historically been five methods of acquiring territorial sovereignty, reflecting Roman property law: occupation, accretion, cession, conquest and prescription.

The law of the sea is the area of international law concerning the principles and rules by which states and other entities interact in maritime matters. It encompasses areas and issues such as navigational rights, sea mineral rights, and coastal waters jurisdiction. The law of the sea was primarily composed of customary law until the 20th century, beginning with the League of Nations Codification Conference in 1930, the UN Conference on the Law of the Sea and the adoption of the UNCLOS in 1982. The UNCLOS was particularly notable for making international courts and tribunals responsible for the law of the sea.

Maritime zones under international law

The boundaries of a nation's territorial sea were initially proposed to be three miles in the late 18th century. The UNCLOS instead defined it as being at most 12 nautical miles from the baseline (usually the coastal low-water mark) of a state; both military and civilian foreign ships are allowed innocent passage through these waters despite the sea being within the state's sovereignty. A state can have jurisdiction beyond its territorial waters where it claims a contiguous zone of up to 24 nautical miles from its baseline for the purpose of preventing the infringement of its "customs, fiscal, immigration and sanitary regulations". States are also able to claim an exclusive economic zone (EEZ) following passage of the UNCLOS, which can stretch up to 200 nautical miles from the baseline and gives the sovereign state rights over natural resources. Some states have instead chosen to retain their exclusive fishery zones, which cover the same territory. There are specific rules in relation to the continental shelf, as this can extend further than 200 nautical miles. The International Tribunal for the Law of the Sea has specified that a state has sovereign rights over the resources of the entire continental shelf, regardless of its distance from the baseline, but different rights apply to the continental shelf and the water column above it where it is further than 200 nautical miles from the coast.

The UNCLOS defines the high seas as all parts of the sea that are not within a state's EEZ, territorial sea or internal waters. There are six freedoms of the high seas—navigation, overflight, laying submarine cables and pipelines, constructing artificial islands, fishing and scientific research—some of which are subject to legal restrictions. Ships in the high seas are deemed to have the nationality of the flag that they have the right to fly and no other state can exercise jurisdiction over them; the exception is ships used for piracy, which are subject to universal jurisdiction.

=== Finance and trade law ===
In 1944, the Bretton Woods Conference established the International Bank for Reconstruction and Development (later the World Bank) and the IMF. At the conference, the International Trade Organization was proposed but failed to be instituted due to the refusal of the United States to ratify its charter. Three years later, Part IV of the statute was adopted to create the General Agreement on Tariffs and Trade, which operated between 1948 and 1994, when the WTO was established. The OPEC, which banded together to control global oil supply and prices, caused the previous reliance on fixed currency exchange rates to be dropped in favour of floating exchange rates in 1971. During this recession, British Prime Minister Margaret Thatcher and US President Ronald Reagan pushed for free trade and deregulation under a neo-liberal agenda known as the Washington Consensus.

== Conflict and force ==
=== War and armed conflict ===
The law relating to the initiation of armed conflict is jus ad bellum. This was codified in 1928 in the Kellogg–Briand Pact, which stated that conflicts should be settled through peaceful negotiations with the exception, through reservations drafted by some state parties, of self-defence. These fundamental principles were reaffirmed in the UN Charter, which provided for "an almost absolute prohibition on the use of force", with the only three exceptions. The first involves force authorised by the UNSC, as the entity is responsible in the first instance for responding to breaches or threats to the peace and acts of aggression, including the use of force or peacekeeping missions. The second exception is where a state is acting in individual or collective self-defence, as stated in Article 51 of the UN Charter. A state can invoke Article 51 in the case of an "armed attack" but the intention behind this exception has been challenged, particularly as nuclear weapons have become more common, with many states relying instead on the customary right of self-defence as set out in the Caroline test. The ICJ considered collective self-defence in Nicaragua v. United States, where the U.S. unsuccessfully argued that it had mined harbours in Nicaragua in pre-emption of an attack by the Sandinista government against another member of the Organization of American States. The final exception is where the UNSC delegates its responsibility for collective security to a regional organisation, such as NATO. The Fourth Geneva Convention also further developed a body of law that is called "Occupation Law". This details the temporary rights of the occupying power and entrusts it with the need to protect the local population and the integrity of the area.

=== Humanitarian law ===
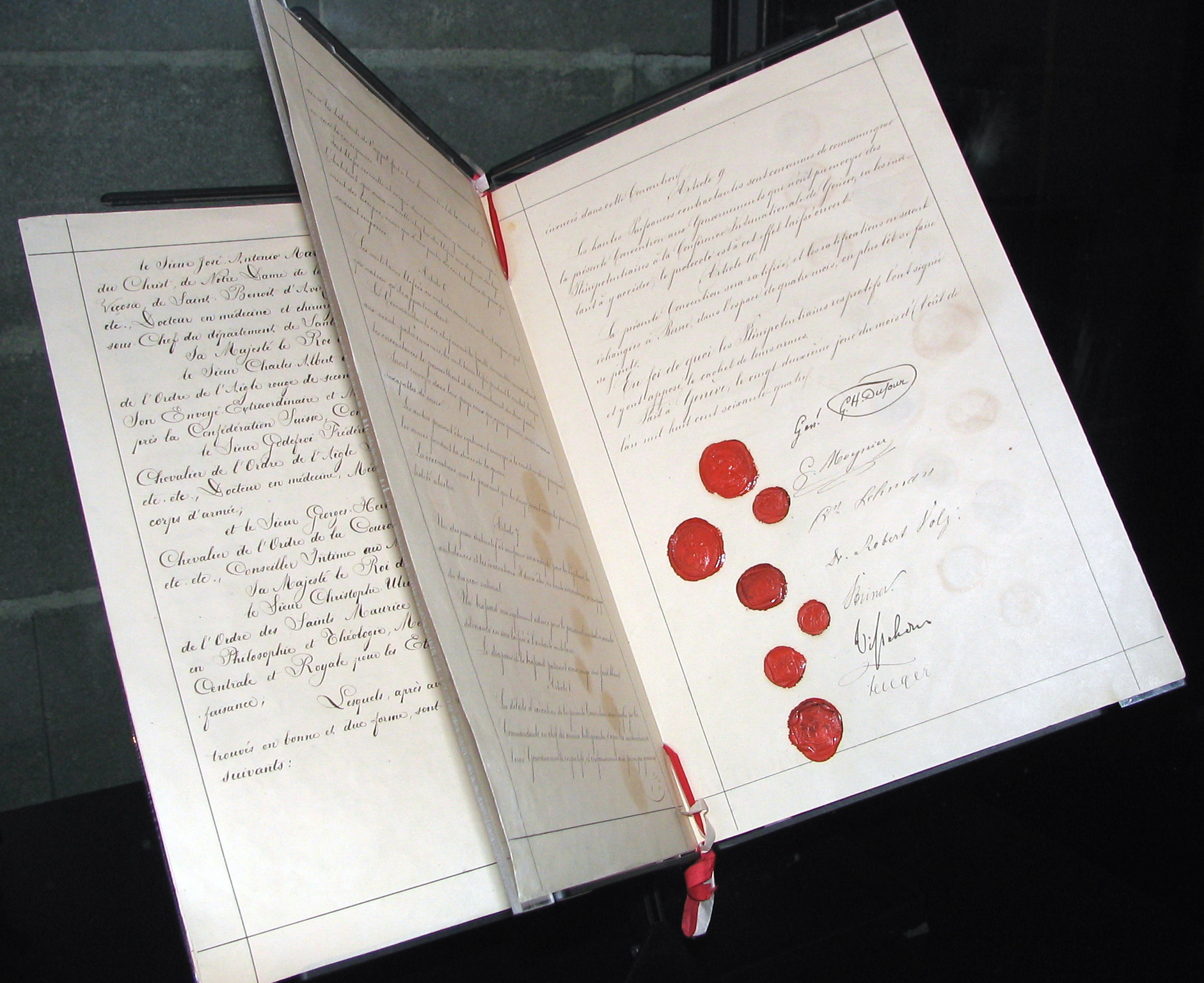
The First Geneva Convention (1864) is one of the earliest formulations of international law

International humanitarian law (IHL) is an effort to "mitigate the human suffering caused by war" and it is often complementary to the law of armed conflict and international human rights law. The concept of jus in bello (law in war) covers IHL, which is distinct from jus ad bellum. Its scope lasts from the initiation of conflict until a peaceful settlement is reached. There are two main principles in IHL; the principle of distinction dictates that combatants and non-combatants must be treated differently and the principle of not causing disproportionate suffering to combatants. In Legality of the Threat or Use of Nuclear Weapons, the ICJ described these concepts as "intransgressible principles of international customary law".

The two Hague Conventions of 1899 and 1907 considered restrictions on the conduct of war and the Geneva Conventions of 1949, which were organised by the International Committee of the Red Cross, considered the protection of innocent parties in conflict zones. The First Geneva Convention covers wounded and ill combatants, the Second Geneva Convention covers combatants at sea who are wounded, ill or shipwrecked, the Third Geneva Convention covers prisoners of war and the Fourth Geneva Convention covers civilians. These conventions were supplemented by the additional Protocol I and Protocol II, which were codified in 1977. Initially IHL conventions were only considered to apply to a conflict if all parties had ratified the relevant convention under the si omnes clause, but this posed concerns and the Martens clause began to be implemented, providing that the law would generally be deemed to apply.

There have been various agreements to outlaw particular types of weapons, such as the Chemical Weapons Convention and the Biological Weapons Convention. The use of nuclear weapons was determined to be in conflict with principles of IHL by the ICJ in 1995, although the court also held that it "cannot conclude definitively whether the threat or use of nuclear weapons would be lawful or unlawful in an extreme circumstance of self-defence." Multiple treaties have attempted to regulate the use of these weapons, including the Non-Proliferation Treaty and the Joint Comprehensive Plan of Action, but key states have failed to sign or have withdrawn. There have been similar debates on the use of drones and cyberwarfare on the international stage.

=== International criminal law ===
International criminal law sets out the definition of international crimes and compels states to prosecute these crimes. While war crimes were prosecuted throughout history, this has historically been done by national courts. The International Military Tribunal in Nuremberg and the International Military Tribunal for the Far East in Tokyo were established at the end of World War II to prosecute key actors in Germany and Japan. The jurisdiction of the tribunals was limited to crimes against peace (based on the Kellogg–Briand Pact), war crimes (based on the Hague Conventions) and crimes against humanity, establishing new categories of international crime. Throughout the twentieth century, the separate crimes of genocide, torture and terrorism were also recognised.

Initially these crimes were intended to be prosecuted by national courts and subject to their domestic procedures. The Geneva Conventions of 1949, the Additional Protocols of 1977 and the 1984 UN Convention against Torture mandated that the national courts of the contracting countries must prosecute these offenses where the perpetrator is on their territory or extradite them to any other interested state. It was in the 1990s that two ad hoc tribunals, the International Criminal Tribunal for the Former Yugoslavia (ICTY) and the International Criminal Tribunal for Rwanda (ICTR), were established by the UNSC to address specific atrocities. The ICTY had authority to prosecute war crimes, crimes against humanity and genocide occurring in Yugoslavia after 1991 and the ICTR had authority to prosecute genocide, crimes against humanity and grave breaches of the 1949 Geneva Conventions during the 1994 Rwandan genocide.

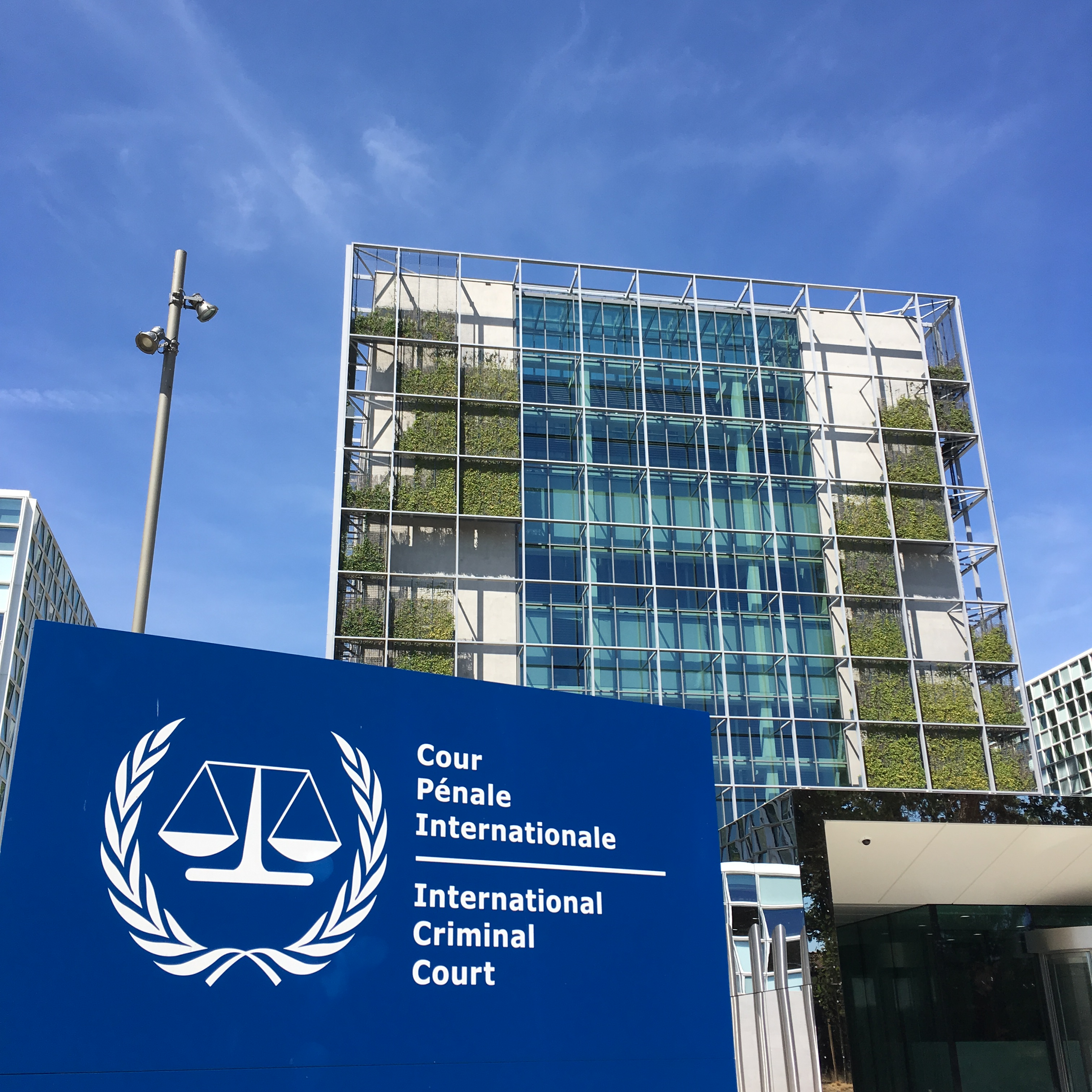
The building housing the International Criminal Court in 2018

The International Criminal Court (ICC), established by the 1998 Rome Statute, is the first and only permanent international court to prosecute genocide, war crimes, crimes against humanity, and the crime of aggression. There are 123 state parties to the ICC although a number of states have declared their opposition to the court; it has been criticised by African countries including The Gambia and Kenya for "imperialist" prosecutions. One particular aspect of the court that has received scrutiny is the principle of complementarity, whereby the ICC only has jurisdiction if the national courts of a state with jurisdiction are "unwilling or unable to prosecute" or where a state has investigated but chosen not to prosecute a case. The United States has a particularly complicated relationship with the ICC; originally signing the treaty in 2000, the US stated in 2002 that it did not intend to become a party as it believed the ICC threatened its national sovereignty and the country does not recognise the court's jurisdiction.

== International legal theory ==
International legal theory comprises a variety of theoretical and methodological approaches used to explain and analyse the content, formation and effectiveness of international law and institutions and to suggest improvements. Some approaches center on the question of compliance: why states follow international norms in the absence of a coercive power that ensures compliance. According to the consent-based model of international law, international law’s binding force is based on the consent of states (can be either express or implied). The major exception to the consent-based model is the Security Council’s authority under Chapter VII of the UN Charter to take military and non-military action “to restore international peace and security.”

Some scholars view compliance failure as a problem of enforcement whereby states can be incentivized to follow international law due to international inducements, reciprocity, concerns about reputation, or domestic political factors. Other scholars see compliance failure as rooted in a lack of state capacity where a willing state is incapable of fully following international legal commitments. Rationalist choice theorists have referred to the "Three Rs" that lead states to comply with international law: Reciprocity, Reputation, and Retaliation. Constructivist scholars emphasize how states are socialized into complying with international law by internalizing norms and seeking status and reputation.

Other perspectives are policy oriented: they elaborate theoretical frameworks and instruments to criticize the existing norms and to make suggestions on how to improve them. Some of these approaches are based on domestic legal theory, some are interdisciplinary, and others have been developed expressly to analyse international law. Classical approaches to International legal theory are the natural law, the Eclectic and the legal positivism schools of thought.

The natural law approach argues that international norms should be based on axiomatic truths. The 16th-century natural law writer de Vitoria examined the questions of the just war, the Spanish authority in the Americas, and the rights of the Native American peoples. In 1625, Grotius argued that nations as well as persons ought to be governed by universal principle based on morality and divine justice while the relations among polities ought to be governed by the law of peoples, the jus gentium, established by the consent of the community of nations on the basis of the principle of pacta sunt servanda, that is, on the basis of the observance of commitments. On his part, de Vattel argued instead for the equality of states as articulated by 18th-century natural law and suggested that the law of nations was composed of custom and law on the one hand, and natural law on the other. During the 17th century, the basic tenets of the Grotian or eclectic school, especially the doctrines of legal equality, territorial sovereignty, and independence of states, became the fundamental principles of the European political and legal system and were enshrined in the 1648 Peace of Westphalia.

The early positivist school emphasized the importance of custom and treaties as sources of international law. In the 16th-century, Gentili used historical examples to posit that positive law (jus voluntarium) was determined by general consent. Cornelis van Bynkershoek asserted that the bases of international law were customs and treaties commonly consented to by various states, while John Jacob Moser emphasized the importance of state practice in international law. The positivism school narrowed the range of international practice that might qualify as law, favouring rationality over morality and ethics. The 1815 Congress of Vienna marked the formal recognition of the political and international legal system based on the conditions of Europe. Modern legal positivists consider international law as a unified system of rules that emanates from the states' will. International law, as it is, is an "objective" reality that needs to be distinguished from law "as it should be". Classic positivism demands rigorous tests for legal validity and it deems irrelevant all extralegal arguments.

=== Alternative views ===
John Austin asserted that due to the principle of par in parem non habet imperium, "so-called" international law, lacking a sovereign power and so unenforceable, was not really law at all, but "positive morality", consisting of "opinions and sentiments...more ethical than legal in nature." Since states are few in number, diverse and atypical in character, unindictable, lack a centralised sovereign power, and their agreements unpoliced and decentralised, Martin Wight argued that international society is better described as anarchy.

Hans Morgenthau believed international law to be the weakest and most primitive system of law enforcement; he likened its decentralised nature to the law that prevails in preliterate tribal societies. Monopoly on violence is what makes domestic law enforceable; but between nations, there are multiple competing sources of force. The confusion created by treaty laws, which resemble private contracts between persons, is mitigated only by the relatively small number of states. He asserted that no state may be compelled to submit a dispute to an international tribunal, making laws unenforceable and voluntary. International law is also unpoliced, lacking agencies for enforcement. He cites a 1947 US opinion poll in which 75% of respondents wanted "an international police to maintain world peace", but only 13% wanted that force to exceed the US armed forces. Later surveys have produced similar contradictory results.

Noura Erakat in her work on law in relation to the question of Palestine, argues that by adopting a more constructivist perspective, international law emerges not simply as a product of politics or state actions but rather as a factor in a relationship of reciprocal constitution. Thereby state actions are influenced, however not directed, by law and law is influenced, however not rewritten by state actions. Additionally, Erakat also underlines a clear difference in the goals and the outcomes of international law. For instance, in striving for state-hood, one may not gain freedom and vice versa. Another caveat added to this perspective is the differentiation between state-hood, independence, and autonomy. Erakat delivers an example of the Oslo Peace Process and the Madrid Conference of 1991 in which U.S. policy sought to establish Palestinian autonomy to govern their territory without formal state recognition. Also plays with the argument that the instrumental use of international law, may in fact not simply produce justice but a clear trade-off in advantages and disadvantages between actors.

== Challenges and controversies ==
International law is currently navigating a complex array of challenges and controversies that have underscored the dynamic nature of international relations in the 21st century. Some of these challenges include enforcement difficulties, the impact of technological advancements, climate change, and worldwide pandemics. The possible re-emergence of a right of conquest as international law is contentious.

Among the most pressing issues are enforcement difficulties, where the lack of a centralized global authority often leads to non-compliance with international norms, particularly evident in violations of International Humanitarian Law (IHL). Sovereignty disputes further complicate the international legal landscape, as conflicts over territorial claims and jurisdictional boundaries arise, challenging the principles of non-interference and peaceful resolution. Furthermore, the emergence of new global powers introduces additional layers of complexity, as these nations assert their interests and challenge established norms, necessitating a reevaluation of the global legal order to accommodate shifting power dynamics.

Cybersecurity has also emerged as a critical concern, with international law striving to address the threats posed by cyber-attacks to national security, infrastructure, and individual privacy. Climate change demands unprecedented international cooperation, as evidenced by agreements like the Paris Agreement, though disparities in responsibilities among nations pose significant challenges to collective action.

The COVID-19 pandemic has further highlighted the interconnectedness of the global community, emphasizing the need for coordinated efforts to manage health crises, vaccine distribution, and economic recovery.

=== Democratic legitimacy ===
International law has been criticized due to limited democratic legitimacy. International courts have been criticised for a lack of legitimacy, as they can seem disconnected from the crimes that have occurred, but hybrid courts aim to combine both national and international components, operating in the jurisdiction where the crimes in question occurred. There has been debate about what courts can be included within this definition, but generally the Special Panels for Serious Crimes in East Timor, the Kosovo Specialist Chambers, the Special Court for Sierra Leone, the Special Tribunal for Lebanon and the Extraordinary Chambers in the Courts of Cambodia have been listed. Backlash to international laws can contribute to judicial populism.

== See also ==
- immigration lawyer
- List of International Court of Justice cases
- List of international public law topics
- List of treaties
- Law
- Justice
- Consular law
- Aviation law and Space law
- Centre for International Law (CIL)
- Comparative law
- Diplomatic law and Diplomatic recognition
- Global administrative law
- Global policeman
- International litigation
- International community
- International constitutional law
- International regulation
- International relations
- INTERPOL
- Prize law
- Refugee law
- Third World Approaches to International Law
- UNIDROIT
- Rule of Law in Armed Conflicts Project
