= Opinio juris =

Opinio juris may refer to:

- Sources of international law#Opinio juris
- Opinio juris sive necessitatis
- Opinio Juris (blog)
