= Customary international humanitarian law =

Body of unwritten rules

Customary international humanitarian law, commonly abbreviated as customary IHL, is a body of unwritten rules of public international law which governs conduct during armed conflict.

== Legal terminology ==
=== Customary international law ===
Customary international law, like international treaty law, is recognized as a primary source of public international law. While international treaties are written agreements by which states establish certain rules, customary international law consists of unwritten rules which derive from "general practice accepted as law." Therefore, for a rule of international custom to be established, two elements are required: "an objective one, the repeated behaviour of States … and a subjective one, the belief that such behaviour depends on a legal obligation (opinio juris sive necessitatis)." The objective element is also often referred to as state practice; the subjective element as opinio juris.

=== International humanitarian law ===
International humanitarian law (IHL), also known as the law of war and the law of armed conflict, is the area of public international law which aims, "for humanitarian reasons, to limit the effects of armed conflict. It protects persons who are not or are no longer participating in the hostilities and restricts the means and methods of warfare."

War is as old as mankind and so is, in a sense, the law of war (or IHL). Behaviour during armed conflict "has always been subject to certain principles and customs,” based on the practices of armies around the world. Since the mid-19th century, however, many such rules have been codified by states in international treaties, like the Hague Conventions and the Geneva Conventions of 1949 and their optional or Additional Protocols of 1977. Not withstanding this increasing codification of IHL, customary rules remain relevant in contemporary armed conflicts.

== Current relevance ==
Customary international humanitarian law complements the protection provided by international humanitarian treaty law in situations of armed conflict. International treaty law only binds states which are party to a particular treaty; customary international law, on the other hand, is, in general, binding on all states. While some international humanitarian law treaties, such as the 1949 Geneva Conventions, are today universally ratified, this is not the case for all treaties. Here, customary international humanitarian law can be used to fill gaps in the protection provided in situations of armed conflict.

Furthermore, many of today's armed conflicts do not take place between states but are of a non-international character. International humanitarian treaty law, while highly detailed as regards international armed conflicts, is considerably less developed in relation to non-international armed conflicts. Here, again, customary international humanitarian law provides further rules which are not stated in conventions.

In 2005, mandated by the states convened at the 26th International Conference of the Red Cross and Red Crescent, and after nearly 10 years of research and consultation, the International Committee of the Red Cross (ICRC) presented a Study on Customary International Humanitarian Law, published by Cambridge University Press. Volume I of the study contains 161 rules assessed by the authors of the Study to be of customary status, most of them applicable in both international and non-international armed conflicts. Volume II presents the practice which forms the basis of the conclusions in Volume I.

Since August 2010, an online version of the Study, the ICRC's Customary IHL Database, is also available. Part One of the database reflects Volume I of the print edition of the study. Part Two, based on Volume II of the print edition, presents what the authors believe is state practice relating to most aspects of IHL, purportedly expressed in national legislation, military manuals, official statements, and case-law, and the practice of other entities such as international organizations, international courts, and international tribunals. Part Two is updated regularly through a joint project of the ICRC and the British Red Cross Society, based at the Lauterpacht Centre for International Law at the University of Cambridge.

This Study has been the subject of serious criticism, in light of controversial ways used for identifying customary humanitarian law. One criticism has been that "Although the Study’s introduction describes what is generally an appropriate approach to assessing State practice, the Study frequently fails to apply this approach in a rigorous way", and that "the Study tends to merge the practice and opinio juris requirements into a single test." Law Professor Yoram Dinstein was very critical of the Study. He wrote that "as regards international armed conflicts, the Study clearly suffers from an unrealistic desire to show that controversial provisions of Additional Protocol I to the Geneva Conventions are declaratory of customary international law … By overreaching, I think that the Study has failed its primary mission."

== ICRC’s Customary IHL Study and Database ==
A database of the International Committee of the Red Cross’s Customary IHL Study, developed in association with the British Red Cross, was launched by the ICRC in August 2011. The ICRC’s Customary IHL Database is designed to be used as a legal reference in international and non-international armed conflicts, including by courts, tribunals and international organizations.

The Database is updated on a regular basis. A selection of national practice of 30 countries was added in March 2011 followed by an additional 27 countries in November of the same year. On 13 December 2012, the ICRC made available its updated collection and analysis of what it considers practice from 23 countries: Argentina, Bangladesh, Belgium, Bosnia and Herzegovina, Burundi, Chad, Chile, Colombia, Croatia, Djibouti, El Salvador, Guatemala, the Islamic Republic of Iran, Japan, Mexico, Peru, Serbia, Serbia and Montenegro, Senegal, Spain, Switzerland, Uruguay, and Vietnam.
