= The Paquete Habana =

Paquete Habana v. United States
- Supreme Court of the United States

Argued November 7–8, 1899 Decided January 8, 1900
- Full case name: Paquete Habana.; The Loda.
- Citations: 175 U.S. 677 (more) 20 S. Ct. 290; 44 L. Ed. 320; 1900 U.S. LEXIS 1714

Case history
- Prior: Appeals From the District Court of the United States for the Southern District of Florida
- Subsequent: None

Holding
- Federal courts could look to customary international law because it is an integrated part of American law.

Court membership
- Chief Justice Melville Fuller Associate Justices John M. Harlan · Horace Gray; David J. Brewer · Henry B. Brown; George Shiras Jr. · Edward D. White; Rufus W. Peckham · Joseph McKenna

Case opinions
- Majority: Gray, joined by Brewer, Brown, Shiras, White, Peckham
- Dissent: Fuller, joined by Harlan, McKenna

The Paquete Habana; The Lola, 175 U.S. 677 (1900), was a landmark decision of the United States Supreme Court concerning the applicability and recognition of international law by the United States. The Court held that the capture of fishing vessels as prizes of war violated customary international law, which is integrated with U.S. law and binding as such. Paquete Habana influenced subsequent court decisions that incorporated international law regarding other matters. The case is also notable for citing a wide breadth of historical and international sources, including jurists from around the world and foreign state practices going back centuries.

== Background of the case ==
In April 1898, two fishing vessels, the Paquete Habana and the Lola, separately sailed from the Spanish colony of Cuba. Both were eventually captured by merchant vessels comprising the United States blockade of the island, which, unbeknownst to the crew, had been instituted amid rising tensions between the two countries. President William McKinley proclaimed that the blockade was "in pursuance of the laws of the United States, and the law of nations applicable to such cases."

Shortly thereafter, the Spanish–American War was officially declared, and McKinley issued another proclamation stating that the war would be conducted "in harmony with the present views of nations and sanctioned by their recent practice" and establishing rules for the capture of prizes; however, there was no mention of fishing vessels. The Paquete Habana and the Lola were ultimately taken to Key West, Florida, where they were auctioned by the federal district court, which has jurisdiction over prize cases.

Admiral William T. Sampson, who commanded the blockade, justified the seizures by stating that most fishing vessels flying under the Spanish banner were manned by well trained seamen with prior naval experience who could be called up to fight for Spain. The U.S. also relied on the longstanding international practice of capturing enemy vessels as prizes of war.

The owners of the vessels appealed to the U.S. Supreme Court, citing a centuries-long tradition of nations exempting fishing vessels from prize capture, even during war. At the time of capture, neither vessel had evidence of aiding the enemy, no arms were found on board, and no attempts were made to run the blockade or to resist capture. Pointing to McKinley's proclamation that the blockade conformed with international law, the claimants thus argued that the blockade should not have captured the vessels as prizes.

On appeal, the U.S. government argued that it had complied with international law under which there was precedent for the executive of a nation, through his military commanders, to exercise discretion as to whether there was an exemption of fishing vessels from prize capture. Notably, the government never contested that it must abide by international law.

Both parties in the case were invoking customary international law, the prevailing and long-running practices and norms that are observed and accepted by most countries as obligations, but differed as to what it permitted with respect to prizes.

== Decision ==
In a 6–3 decision authored by Justice Gray, the Supreme Court ruled that coastal fishing vessels are exempt from capture as prizes of war under customary international law, which, barring a "controlling executive or legislative act or judicial decision", must be incorporated into the corpus of U.S. law.

The Court cited lengthy legal precedents in support of this conclusion, which it described as an "ancient usage among civilized nations, beginning centuries ago, and gradually ripening into a rule of international law." In 1403, King Henry IV of England decreed his officers leave fishermen alone during times of war. He then signed a treaty with France reaffirming this act between both parties. Similarly, in 1521, a treaty between Emperor Charles V of the Holy Roman Empire and King Francis I of France exempted fishing vessels from capture, on the basis that both nations would face widespread hunger if fishermen did not feel safe to set sail.

Justice Gray also relied on the theories and opinions of contemporary jurists and commentators from across the world to buttress the Court's reasoning, decades before such scholarly legal work would be codified as a primary source of international law:

[A]t the present day, by the general consent of the civilized nations of the world, and independently of any express treaty or other public act, it is an established rule of international law, founded on considerations of humanity... and of the mutual convenience of belligerent states, that coast fishing vessels, with their implements and supplies, cargoes and crews, unarmed and honestly pursuing their peaceful calling of catching and bringing in fresh fish, are exempt from capture as prize of war.

Among the most oft-cited and famous quotes of the decision concerned the relationship of international law to domestic U.S. law:

International law is part of our law, and must be ascertained and administered by the courts of justice of appropriate jurisdiction as often as questions of right depending upon it are duly presented for their determination. For this purpose, where there is no treaty and no controlling executive or legislative act or judicial decision, resort must be had to the customs and usages of civilized nations, and, as evidence of these, to the works of jurists and commentators who by years of labor, research, and experience have made themselves peculiarly well acquainted with the subjects of which they treat. Such works are resorted to by judicial tribunals, not for the speculations of their authors concerning what the law ought to be, but for trustworthy evidence of what the law really is.

The Supreme Court decision reversed the district court and ordered that the proceeds of the auctions, as well as any profits made from the vessels' cargo, be restored to the claimants "with damages and costs."

=== Fuller's dissent ===
Chief Justice Fuller delivered a dissenting opinion, which was joined by Justices Harlan and McKenna. Fuller essentially agreed with the federal government's position and argued that the capture of fishing vessels as prizes had been both in accordance with customary international law and militarily necessary, and that any exemption is under the discretion of the President as the nation's executive.

== See also ==
- Garcia-Mir v. Meese
- List of United States Supreme Court cases, volume 175
