= Equidistance principle =

Legal concept in maritime boundary claims

The equidistance principle, or principle of equidistance, is a legal concept in maritime boundary claims that a nation's maritime boundaries should conform to a median line that is equidistant from the shores of neighboring nations. The concept was developed in the process of settling disputes in which the borders of adjacent nations were located on a contiguous continental shelf:

An equidistance line is one for which every point on the line is equidistant from the nearest points on the baselines being used. The equidistance principle is a methodology that has been endorsed by the United Nations Convention on the Law of the Sea but predates that treaty and has been used by the Supreme Court of the United States, states, and nations to establish boundaries equitably.

The equidistance principle represents one aspect of customary international law, but its importance is evaluated in light of other factors such as history:

"Historic rights" or titles of some or another kind will acquire enhanced, rather than diminished, importance as a result of the narrowing of the 'physical' rather than the 'legal' sources of right. It is important to remember that, although historical claims were not successful in the Gulf of Maine case, the identification of a 'status quo' or 'modus vivendi' line in Tunisia–Libya was of decisive importance in confirming the equitableness of the first stage of delimitation. States will scrupulously avoid, more than ever, any appearance of acquiescence where acquiescence is not intended; prudent coordination can be expected between petroleum and mining ministries and the legal advisers of foreign ministries." — Highet, Keith. (1989). "Whatever became of natural prolongation."

== History ==
The United States used equidistance in the 1805 Act of Congress that divided public lands by measurements as close as possible to "equidistant from those two corners which stand on the same line." One of the most notable historical events regarding equidistance is the Argument between Germany, Netherlands and Denmark. All three countries laid claim to a specific area within the ocean. Germany claimed that due to special circumstances they owned that land so the three countries fought through the United Nations. Eventually the ICJ stepped in and held a trial regarding the topic.

International law also refers to equidistance. For example, Article 6 of the 1958 Geneva Convention on the Continental Shelf explains:

"Where the same continental shelf is adjacent to the territories of two or more States whose coasts are opposite each other, the boundary of the continental shelf appertaining to such States shall be determined by agreement between them. In the absence of agreement, and unless another boundary line is justified by special circumstances, the boundary is the median line, every point of which is equidistant from the nearest points of the baselines from which the breadth of the territorial sea of each State is measured."

== See also ==
- Natural prolongation principle

== Sources ==
- Dorinda G. Dallmeyer and Louis De Vorsey. (1989). Rights to Oceanic Resources: Deciding and Drawing Maritime Boundaries. Dordrecht: Martinus Nijhoff Publishers. ISBN 9780792300199; OCLC 18981568
