= International regulation =

Governance of transnational policy areas

"International regulation" is regulation that occurs at the international level, often exercised by international organizations. An advantage of international regulation is that it allows localities and the individuals in them to be held accountable for the impact that their actions (e.g. pollution) have on other localities.

A series of powerful international regulatory regimes have arisen especially in fields dealing with risk, such as banking, accountancy and the actuarial profession. In banking, the Basel Accords regulate a wide range of bank behavior, such as capital adequacy, the requirement to have capital reserved against risk. In accountancy, the International Financial Reporting Standards (IFRS) have replaced many national accounting standards to enable international comparability of reporting of accounts. The International Actuarial Association is working on standardization of international practice.

Although there is no international government to issue regulations, negotiations between industry bodies and national governments have often succeeded in orchestrating regulatory regimes that are obeyed across most nations.

== History ==
=== Maritime regulation ===
The international nature of the sea has resulted in two thousand years of development of maritime law and the law of the sea (such as the medieval Rolls of Oléron), which regulate navigation, the freedom of the seas and the use of resources such as minerals. In the mid-nineteenth century, British domination of navigation resulted in British rules being adopted as International Regulations for Preventing Collisions at Sea, and similarly for the Plimsoll line to prevent overloading of vessels. The need for safety and rescue at sea led to the building of remote lighthouses and the standardization of distress signals in the International Radiotelegraph Convention (1906). In response to the sinking of the Titanic, the International Convention for the Safety of Life at Sea of 1914 laid down standards for lifeboats and continuous radio watches. Navigation on the Rhine, which flows through many countries, was controlled by the Central Commission for Navigation on the Rhine, established after the 1815 Congress of Vienna.

Resources accessible by sea have been subject to overexploitation because of lack of regulation. Concern over overfishing in the North Sea led to the creation of the International Council for the Exploration of the Sea in 1902, which eventually sponsored limits on fishing and cooperation in marine science. Despite the collapse of whale populations from unrestrained whaling by many countries, regulation was slow in coming. The 1931 Geneva Convention for Regulation of Whaling and the 1937 International Agreement for the Regulation of Whaling had limited effectiveness and were replaced by the more effective International Convention for the Regulation of Whaling which came into effect in 1948. Rival claims to Antarctica were put aside in the Antarctic Treaty of 1961 which preserved Antarctica as a demilitarized zone limited to scientific research. The Outer Space Treaty of 1967 extends similar principles to ensure that outer space is not divided into exclusive zones.

The dangers of miscommunication at sea by multilingual crews led to the need for an international maritime language. With British domination of the seas from the eighteenth century, that was inevitably English. English requirements for maritime communication have developed into the simplified Seaspeak. Aviation followed, and in 1951 the International Civil Aviation Organization (ICAO) recommended that English be used exclusively in air communications. The recommendation was followed. ICAO adopted in 1956 the NATO Phonetic Alphabet (Alfa, Bravo, Charlie ...) for spelling out words when they might be misunderstood. These developments were important in making English the international language generally.

=== Trade, health and warfare regulation ===
International trade required the development of binding customs applicable across international boundaries, such as the medieval law merchant. Customs of diplomatic immunity also have a long history; they are now codified in the Vienna Convention on Diplomatic Relations (1961).

The Universal Postal Union, established in 1874, coordinated international postage so that payment of postage in any country ensured its delivery anywhere. The International Telegraph Union (later International Telecommunication Union) was formed in 1865 to standardize telegraphic communication.

International Sanitary Conferences, beginning in 1851, standardized quarantine arrangements for infectious diseases. The World Health Organization has continued such work, in areas such as coordinating responses to pandemics.

The 1864 Geneva Convention began the regulation of warfare, initially providing for the protection of those aiding sick and wounded soldiers. The Hague Conventions of 1899 and 1907 attempted to outlaw barbarities in war but had little effect in World War I. However the 1925 Geneva Protocol outlawing chemical and biological warfare was largely adhered to in World War II, which did not see a repetition of the chemical warfare of World War I.

=== Standardization ===
British domination of navigation led to Greenwich Mean Time becoming a de facto international time standard from the eighteenth century. The 1884 International Meridian Conference in Washington DC determined that the Greenwich Meridian would be taken to be zero degrees longitude, with a view to time coordination. National legislation on time zones gradually created an agreed system of zones, defined in terms of offsets from Universal Coordinated Time.

The metric system of weights and measures, imposed in Revolutionary France in 1799, gained acceptance during the nineteenth century, especially in science. The Metre Convention, signed in Paris in 1875 by 17 countries, created the International Bureau of Weights and Measures to define the units of the metric system.

Standardization of bolts and screws and of machine parts developed gradually in the nineteenth century. The International Federation of the National Standardizing Associations was founded in 1926 with a broad remit to enhance international cooperation for all technical standards and specifications. It was superseded in 1947 by the International Organization for Standardization (ISO) which sets a wide range of standards in thousands of areas. (list)

The first International Electrical Congress in Paris in 1881 defined or instituted processes for defining basic electrical units such as the volt and ampere. The subsequent International Electrotechnical Commission, set up in 1906, developed standards for electrical and electronic technologies.

=== Finance ===
Although banks in the nineteenth century did not create an international authority, the gold standard (convertibility of currencies into gold at fixed rates) created de facto international coordination of currencies. Adopted by Britain in 1821 and by other major currencies in the later nineteenth century, it collapsed with the outbreak of World War I in 1914 and revivals in the 1920s were unsuccessful.

The Bank for International Settlements, established in Basel in 1930 to facilitate German reparations, soon became a means of cooperation between national central banks and later set standards of capital adequacy for banks. The Bretton Woods system, established in 1945, regulated exchange rates between currencies until the 1970s.

== See also ==
- International law
- Customary international law
- List of international common standards
