= Chapter XIV of the United Nations Charter =

Division of the United Nations

Chapter XIV of the United Nations Charter deals with the International Court of Justice. Most provisions related to the World Court are contained in the Statute of the International Court of Justice, which is annexed to the Charter. Article 93 states that all UN members are members of the World Court. Article 94 requires all members to abide by World Court decisions in any cases to which they are a party, and gives the UN Security Council power to enforce such decisions. The World Court is also authorized to issue advisory opinions upon request. Chapter XIV is analogous to Article 14 (and to some extent, Article 13) of the Covenant of the League of Nations.
