= Sources of international law =

Types of sources of international law and the scholarly theories about them

International law, also known as "law of nations", refers to the body of rules which regulate the conduct of sovereign states in their relations with one another. Sources of international law include treaties, international customs, general widely recognized principles of law, the decisions of national and lower courts, and scholarly writings. They are the materials and processes out of which the rules and principles regulating the international community are developed. They have been influenced by a range of political and legal theories.

The U.S. Department of State lists the "sources of international lawmaking" as including "treaties, executive agreements, legislation, Federal regulations, Federal court decisions, testimony and statements before Congressional and international bodies, diplomatic notes, correspondence, speeches, press conference statements, and even internal memoranda."

== Modern views ==
Article 38(1) of the Statute of the International Court of Justice is generally recognized as a definitive statement of the sources of international law. It requires the Court to apply, among other things, (a) international conventions, whether general or particular, establishing rules expressly recognized by the contesting states; (b) international custom, as evidence of a general practice accepted as law; (c) the general principles of law recognized by civilized nations; (d) subject to the provisions of Article 59, judicial decisions and the teachings of the most highly qualified publicists of the various nations, as subsidiary means for the determination of rules of law.

== Historic considerations and development ==
During the 19th century, it was recognized by legal positivists that a sovereign could limit its authority to act by consenting to an agreement according to the principle pacta sunt servanda. This consensual view of international law was reflected in the 1920 Statute of the Permanent Court of International Justice, and was later preserved in Article 38(1) of the 1946 Statute of the International Court of Justice.

The core of broad principles of law is general and dynamic, and they can sometimes be reduced to a proverb or a basic idea. Unlike other types of regulations, such as ordered law or agreements, broad standards of law have not been "established" according to the right sources of law. General norms of law, on the other hand, are regarded as a component of positive law, even if they are only used as auxiliary devices. They define critical principles for the framework's actual operation and, in general, are drafted from the legal executive. General standards of law have been the subject of extensive doctrinal debate in international law, owing to the various connotations attributed to the concept and the hypothetical concerns that they raise. The use of the expression "central standards of international law", which is at the top of the overall set of laws and begins in settlement or custom (e.g., the guideline of sovereign correspondence of states or the rule of the forbiddance of danger or the use of power), and which will not be managed here, causes a lot of confusion. Given the language used in Article 38, paragraph 1(c) of the Statute of the International Court of Justice. ("universal standards of law as recognised by acculturated countries"), the beginning of universal standards of law as applied at the global level has also been a source of debate. The conventional wisdom holds that these standards have their origins in homegrown general systems of laws. Once it is established that some of these broad instruments are frequently shared rules found in domestic systems, they can be utilised in international law as well. They are rational derivations that can be found in any overall group of laws: the standard of restitution for harm committed, the standard of rule understanding, or those used for the purpose of rule struggles—many of them known through Latin adages—are true models. Various general legal standards, such as "audiatur et altera" standards, "actori incumbit onus probandi", or the method that the designated authority of benefits is also judge of the coincidental locale, have been promoted by the legal executive policy is very important of any war.

== Hierarchy ==
On the question of preference between sources of international law, rules established by treaty will take preference if such an instrument exists. It is also argued however that international treaties and international custom are sources of international law of equal validity; new custom may supersede older treaties and new treaties may override older custom. Also, jus cogens (peremptory norm) is a custom, not a treaty. Judicial decisions and juristic writings are regarded as auxiliary sources of international law, whereas it is unclear whether the general principles of law recognized by 'civilized nations' should be recognized as a principal or auxiliary source of international law. Nevertheless, treaty, custom, and general principles of law are generally recognized as primary sources of international law.

== Treaties ==
Treaties and conventions are the persuasive source of international law and are considered "hard law". Treaties can play the role of contracts between two or more parties, such as an extradition treaty or a defense pact. Treaties can also be legislation to regulate a particular aspect of international relations or form the constitutions of international organizations. Whether or not all treaties can be regarded as sources of law, they are sources of obligation for the parties to them. Article 38(1)(a) of the ICJ Statute, which uses the term "international conventions", concentrates upon treaties as a source of contractual obligation but also acknowledges the possibility of a state expressly accepting the obligations of a treaty to which it is not formally a party.

For a treaty-based rule to be a source of law, rather than simply a source of obligation, it must either be capable of affecting non-parties or have consequences for parties more extensive than those specifically imposed by the treaty itself.

Thus, the procedures or methods by treaties become legally binding are formal source of law which is a process by a legal rule comes into existence: it is law creating.

=== Treaties as custom ===
Some treaties are the result of codifying existing customary law, such as laws governing the global commons, and jus ad bellum. While the purpose is to establish a code of general application, its effectiveness depends upon the number of states that ratify or accede to the particular convention. Relatively few such instruments have a sufficient number of parties to be regarded as international law in their own right. The most obvious example is the 1949 Geneva Conventions for the Protection of War Victims.

Most multi-lateral treaties fall short of achieving such a near-universal degree of formal acceptance and are dependent upon their provisions being regarded as representing customary international law and, by this indirect route, as binding upon non-parties. This outcome is possible in a number of ways:

- When the treaty rule reproduces an existing rule of customary law, the rule will be clarified in terms of the treaty provision. A notable example is the Vienna Convention on the Law of Treaties 1969, which was considered by the ICJ to be law even before it had been brought into force.
- When a customary rule is in the process of development, its incorporation in a multilateral treaty may have the effect of consolidating or crystallizing the law in the form of that rule. It is not always easy to identify when this occurs. Where the practice is less developed, the treaty provision may not be enough to crystallize the rule as part of customary international law.
- Even if the rule is new, the drafting of the treaty provision may be the impetus for its adoption in the practice of states, and it is the subsequent acceptance of the rule by states that renders it effective as part of customary law. If a broad definition is adopted of state practice, the making of a treaty would fall within the definition. Alternatively, it is possible to regard the treaty as the final act of state practice required to establish the rule in question, or as the necessary articulation of the rule to give it the opinio juris of customary international law.
- Convention-based "instant custom" has been identified by the ICJ on several occasions as representing customary law without explanation of whether the provision in question was supported by state practice. This has happened with respect to a number of provisions of the Vienna Convention on the Law of Treaties 1969. If "instant custom" is valid as law, it could deny to third parties the normal consequences of non-accession.

=== The United Nations Charter ===
Pursuant to Chapter XVI, Article 103 of the United Nations Charter, the obligations under the United Nations Charter overrides the terms of any other treaty. Meanwhile, its Preamble affirms the establishment of the obligations out of treaties and source of international law.

== International custom ==
Article 38(1)(b) of the ICJ Statute refers to "international custom" as a source of international law, specifically emphasizing the two requirements of state practice plus acceptance of the practice as obligatory or opinio juris sive necessitatis (usually abbreviated as opinio juris).

Derived from the consistent practice of (originally) Western states accompanied by opinio juris (the conviction of States that the consistent practice is required by a legal obligation), customary international law is differentiated from acts of comity (mutual recognition of government acts) by the presence of opinio juris (although in some instances, acts of comity have developed into customary international law, i.e. diplomatic immunity). Treaties have gradually displaced much customary international law. This development is similar to the replacement of customary or common law by codified law in municipal legal settings, but customary international law continues to play a significant role in international law.

=== State practice ===
This element involves an examination of what rules states are observing. When examining state practice to determine relevant rules of international law, it is necessary to take into account every activity of the organs and officials of states that relate to that purpose. There has been continuing debate over where a distinction should be drawn as to the weight that should be attributed to what states do, rather than what they say represents the law. In its most extreme form, this would involve rejecting what states say as practice and relegating it to the status of evidence of opinio juris. A more moderate version would evaluate what a state says by reference to the occasion on which the statement was made. It is only relatively powerful countries with extensive international contacts and interests that have regular opportunities of contributing by deed to the practice of international law. The principal means of contribution to state practice for the majority of states will be at meetings of international organizations, particularly the UN General Assembly, by voting and otherwise expressing their view on matters under consideration. Moreover, there are circumstances in which what states say may be the only evidence of their view as to what conduct is required in a particular situation.

The notion of practice establishing a customary rule implies that the practice is followed regularly, or that such state practice must be "common, consistent and concordant". Given the size of the international community, the practice does not have to encompass all states or be completely uniform. There has to be a sufficient degree of participation, especially on the part of states whose interests are likely to be most affected, and an absence of substantial dissent. There have been a number of occasions on which the ICJ has rejected claims that a customary rule existed because of a lack of consistency in the practice brought to its attention.

Within the context of a specific dispute, however, it is not necessary to establish the generality of practice. A rule may apply if a state has accepted the rule as applicable to it individually, or because the two states belong to a group of states between which the rule applies.

A dissenting state is entitled to deny the opposability of a rule in question if it can demonstrate its persistent objection to that rule, either as a member of a regional group or by virtue of its membership of the international community. It is not easy for a single state to maintain its dissent. Also, rules of the jus cogens have a universal character and apply to all states, irrespective of their wishes.

Demand for rules that are responsive to increasingly rapid changes has led to the suggestion that there can be, in appropriate circumstances, such a concept as "instant custom". Even within traditional doctrine, the ICJ has recognized that passage of a short period of time is not necessarily a bar to the formation of a new rule. Because of this, the question is sometimes raised as to whether the word "custom" is suitable to a process that could occur with great rapidity.

=== Practice by international organizations ===
It may be argued that the practice of international organizations, most notably that of the United Nations, as it appears in the resolutions of the Security Council and the General Assembly, are an additional source of international law, even though it is not mentioned as such in Article 38(1) of the 1946 Statute of the International Court of Justice. Article 38(1) is closely based on the corresponding provision of the 1920 Statute of the Permanent Court of International Justice, thus predating the role that international organizations have come to play in the international plane. That is, the provision of Article 38(1) may be regarded as 'dated, and this can most vividly be seen in the mention made of 'civilized nations', a mentioning that appears all the more quaint after the decolonization process that took place in the early 1960s and the participation of nearly all nations of the world in the United Nations.

=== Opinio juris ===
Opinio juris refers to customary international law and means "opinion of law." In international law, the term is used to refer to state actions and practices taken under a belief that such actions and practices are legal obligations. A wealth of state practice does not usually carry with it a presumption that opinio juris exists. "Not only must the acts concerned amount to a settled practice, but they must also be such, or be carried out in such a way, as to be evidence of a belief that this practice is rendered obligatory by the existence of a rule of law requiring it."

In cases where practice (of which evidence is given) comprises abstentions from acting, consistency of conduct might not establish the existence of a rule of customary international law. The fact that no nuclear weapons have been used since 1945, for example, does not render their use illegal on the basis of a customary obligation because the necessary opinio juris was lacking.

Although the ICJ has frequently referred to opinio juris as being an equal footing with state practice, the role of the psychological element in the creation of customary law is uncertain.

=== Jus cogens ===
A peremptory norm or jus cogens (Latin for "compelling law" or "strong law") is a principle of international law considered so fundamental that it overrides all other sources of international law, including even the Charter of the United Nations. The principle of jus cogens is enshrined in Article 53 of the Vienna Convention on the Law of Treaties:

For the purposes of the present Convention, a peremptory norm of general international law is a norm accepted and recognised by the international community of States as a whole as a norm from which no derogation is permitted and which can be modified only by a subsequent norm of general international law having the same character.

Rules of jus cogens generally require or forbid the state to do particular acts or respect certain rights. However, some define criminal offenses which the state must enforce against individuals. Generally included on lists of such norms are prohibitions of such crimes and internationally wrongful acts as waging aggressive war, war crimes, crimes against humanity, piracy, genocide, apartheid, slavery and torture.

The evidence supporting the emergence of a rule of jus cogens will be essentially similar to that required to establish the creation of a new rule of customary international law. Indeed, jus cogens could be thought of as a special principle of custom with a superadded opinions juries. The European Court of Human Rights has stressed the international public policy aspect of the jus cogens.

== General principles of law ==
The scope of general principles of law, to which Article 38(1) of the Statute of the ICJ refers, is unclear and controversial but may include such legal principles that are common to a large number of systems of municipal law. Given the limits of treaties or custom as sources of international law, Article 38(1) may be looked upon as a directive to the Court to fill any gap in the law and prevent a non liquet by reference to the general principles.

In earlier stages of the development of international law, rules were frequently drawn from municipal law. In the 19th century, legal positivists rejected the idea that international law could come from any source that did not involve state will or consent but were prepared to allow for the application of general principles of law, provided that they had in some way been accepted by states as part of the legal order. Thus Article 38(1)(c), for example, speaks of general principles "recognized" by states. An area that demonstrates the adoption of municipal approaches is the law applied to the relationship between international officials and their employing organizations, although today the principles are regarded as established international law.

The significance of general principles has undoubtedly been lessened by the increased intensity of treaty and institutional relations between states. Nevertheless, the concepts of estoppel and equity have been employed in the adjudication of international disputes. For example, a state that has, by its conduct, encouraged another state to believe in the existence of a certain legal or factual situation, and to rely on that belief, may be estopped from asserting a contrary situation in its dealings. The principle of good faith was said by the ICJ to be "[o]ne of the basic principles governing the creation and performance of legal obligations". Similarly, there have been frequent references to equity. It is generally agreed that equity cannot be employed to subvert legal rules (that is, operate contra legem). This "equity as law" perception is reinforced by references to equitable principles in the text of the United Nations Convention on the Law of the Sea 1982, though this may be little more than an admission as to the existence, and legitimation, of the discretion of the adjudicator.

However, the principles of estoppel and equity in the international context do not retain all the connotations they do under common law. The reference to the principles as "general" signify that, if rules were to be adapted from municipal law, they should be at a sufficient level of generality to encompass similar rules existing in many municipal systems. Principles of municipal law should be regarded as sources of inspiration rather than as sources of rules of direct application.

== Judicial decisions and juristic writings ==
According to Article 38(1)(d) of its Statute, the ICJ is also to apply "judicial decisions and the teachings of the most highly qualified publicists of the various nations, as subsidiary means for the determination of rules of law". It is difficult to tell what influence these materials have on the development of the law. Pleadings in cases before the ICJ are often replete with references to case law and to legal literature.

=== Judicial decisions ===
The decisions of international and municipal courts and the publications of academics can be referred to, not as a source of law as such, but as a means of recognizing the law established in other sources. In practice, the International Court of Justice does not refer to domestic decisions although it does invoke its previous case-law.

There is no rule of stare decisis in international law. The decision of the Court has no binding force except between the parties and in respect of that particular case. Nevertheless, often the Court would refer to its past decisions and advisory opinions to support its explanation of a present case.

Often the International Court of Justice will consider General Assembly resolutions as indicative of customary international law.

=== Juristic writings ===
Article 38(1)(d) of the International Court of Justice Statute states that the 'teachings of the most highly qualified publicists of the various nations' are also among the 'subsidiary means for the determination of the rules of law'. The scholarly works of prominent jurists are not sources of international law but are essential in developing the rules that are sourced in treaties, custom and the general principles of law. This is accepted practice in the interpretation of international law and was utilized by the United States Supreme Court in The Paquete Habana case (175 US (1900) 677 at 700–1). In the practice of the International Court of Justice, citations to teachings in decisions are exceptional, but Judges routinely refer to them in their individual opinions.

== See also ==
- International law
- Preamble to the United Nations Charter
- Religious law
- Sources of law
