= Statute of the International Court of Justice =

United Nations statute

- Signed: 26 June 1945
- Location: San Francisco, United States
- Effective: 24 October 1945
- Signatories: 50 states
- Parties: 193 states
- Languages: Chinese, English, French, Russian, Spanish

The Statute of the International Court of Justice is an integral part of the United Nations Charter, as specified by Chapter XIV of the United Nations Charter, which established the International Court of Justice (replacing the Permanent Court of International Justice).

== Structure ==
The Statute is divided into 5 chapters and consists of 70 articles. The Statute begins with Article 1 proclaiming:

"The international Court of Justice established by the Charter of the United Nations as the principal judicial organ of the United Nations shall be constituted and shall function in accordance with the provisions of the present Statute."

—

The 69 Articles are grouped in 5 Chapters:

- Chapter I: Organization of the Court (Articles 2 - 33)
- Chapter II: Competence of the Court (Articles 34 - 38)
- Chapter III: Procedure (Articles 39 - 64)
- Chapter IV: Advisory Opinions (Articles 65 - 68)
- Chapter V: Amendment (Articles 69 & 70)

Article 38.1 lists sources that the court may apply to decide a case, including: treaties, customary international law, general principles of law, and (as subsidiary means) judicial decisions and academic writing. These sources are qualified by Article 59 which states that ICJ decisions are binding only to the parties in that case, and Article 38.2 which allows the court to decide a case ex aequo et bono if the parties agree thereto.

== Parties to the Statute ==
Parties upon becoming a UN member Parties prior to joining the UN under Article 93 UN General Assembly non-member observer states which are not parties

All 193 UN member states are parties to the Statute by virtue of their ratification of the UN Charter. Under Article 93(2) of the UN Charter, states which are not a member of the UN may become a party to the Statute, subject to the recommendation of the United Nations Security Council and approval of the United Nations General Assembly.

As of 2025, neither the UN General Assembly non-member observer states, namely the State of Palestine and the Holy See, nor any other states are parties to the statute under these provisions. Switzerland (1948-2002), Liechtenstein (1950-1990), San Marino (1954-1992), Japan (1954-1956), and Nauru (1988-1999) were all parties to the Statute prior to becoming UN member states.

Additionally, states which are not party to the Statute can also make use of the court, under Article 35(2) of the Statute, if they make a declaration accepting the court's jurisdiction and to abide by its rulings. As of 2025, Palestine has made two such declarations for different disputes.
