= Peremptory norm =

Principle of international law from which no derogation is permitted

A peremptory norm (also called jus cogens) is a fundamental rule of international law that is accepted and recognized by the international community of states as a whole as a norm from which no derogation is permitted. Unlike ordinary treaty obligations or customary international law, a peremptory norm cannot be overridden by treaties, agreements, or national laws. Thought to be so fundamental that it even invalidates rules drawn from treaty or custom, "norms of this character, therefore, cannot be derogated from by the will of the contracting parties."

There is no universal agreement regarding precisely which norms are jus cogens nor how a norm reaches that status, but it is generally accepted that jus cogens bans genocide, maritime piracy, enslaving in general (i.e. slavery as well as slave trade), wars of aggression and territorial aggrandizement, and generally as well torture, and refoulement.

== Definition ==
The modern definition of jus cogens norms is found in Article 53 of the Vienna Convention on the Law of Treaties:

A peremptory norm of general international law is a norm accepted and recognized by the international community of states as a whole as a norm from which no derogation is permitted and which can be modified only by a subsequent international norm of the same character.

This means that even states objecting to the norm are bound by it, and any treaty or international agreement conflicting with a peremptory norm is void.

== Status of peremptory norms under international law ==
Unlike ordinary customary law, which has traditionally required consent and allows the alteration of its obligations between states through treaties, peremptory norms may not be violated by any state "through international treaties or local or special customs or even general customary rules not endowed with the same normative force".

Discussions of the necessity of such norms could be traced back as far as 1758 (in Vattel's The Law of Nations) and 1764 (in Christian Wolff's Jus Gentium), clearly rooted in principles of natural law. But it was the judgments of the Permanent Court of International Justice that indicate the existence of such a peremptory norm, in the S.S. Wimbledon case in 1923, not mentioning peremptory norms explicitly but stating how state sovereignty is not inalienable.

Under Article 53 of the Vienna Convention on the Law of Treaties, championed by Third World and socialist states during the 1960s, any treaty that conflicts with a peremptory norm is void. The treaty allows for the emergence of new peremptory norms, but does not specify any peremptory norms. It does mention the prohibition on the threat of use of force and on the use of coercion to conclude an agreement:

A treaty is void if, at the time of its conclusion, it conflicts with a peremptory norm of general international law. For the purposes of the present Convention, a peremptory norm of general international law is a norm accepted and recognized by the international community of states as a whole as a norm from which no derogation is permitted and which can be modified only by a subsequent norm of general international law having the same character.

The Convention also provides that a new peremptory norm voids and terminates previously existing treaties with which it comes into conflict. Per Article 53 of the Vienna Convention, a rule of jus cogens is ordinarily nonderogable and invalidates subsequent norms generated by treaty or by custom—that is, by the ordinary consensual forms of international legislation. Thus, it is a sort of international law that once ensconced, cannot be displaced by states, either in their practice or in their treaties. Therefore, some argue that jus cogens functions like a natural or constitutional law that is so fundamental that states cannot avoid its force, a viewpoint supported both in history and by function.

The number of peremptory norms is considered limited but not exclusively catalogued. The Vienna Convention does not enumerate particular peremptory norms. In 2015, the International Law Commission appointed South African jurist Dire Tladi as Special Rapporteur for the topic. In five reports submitted between 2016 and 2022, Tladi examined the nature, identification, and legal consequences of peremptory norms. Based on Tladi's reports, the International Law Commission adopted on second reading draft conclusions on the identification and legal consequences of peremptory norms, together with a non-exhaustive annex listing norms that the Commission had previously referred to as peremptory. The United Nations General Assembly took note of the conclusions, annex and commentaries in 2023. Generally included are prohibitions on waging aggressive war, crimes against humanity, war crimes, maritime piracy, genocide, racial discrimination amounting to apartheid, slavery, and torture. As an example, international tribunals have held that it is impermissible for a state to acquire territory through war.

Despite the seemingly clear weight of condemnation of such practices, some critics disagree with the division of international legal norms into a hierarchy. There is also disagreement over how such norms are recognized or established.

Some peremptory norms define criminal offences considered to be enforceable against not only states but also individuals. That has been increasingly accepted since the Nuremberg Trials (the first enforcement in world history of international norms upon individuals) and now might be considered uncontroversial. However, the language of peremptory norms was not used in connection with these trials; rather, the basis of criminalisation and punishment of Nazi atrocities was that civilisation could not tolerate their being ignored because it could not survive their being repeated.

There are often disagreements over whether a particular case violates a peremptory norm. As in other areas of law, states generally reserve the right to interpret the concept for themselves.

Many large states have accepted this concept. Some of them have ratified the Vienna Convention, while others have stated in their official statements that they accept the Vienna Convention as "codificatory". Some have applied the concept in their dealings with international organizations and other states.

== International legal theory ==
The possibility of such a fundamental law is hotly controverted by legal positivists who rely exclusively on state consent for the making of international law. Functionally, a rule of jus cogens is, by its nature, a rule so fundamental to the international community of states as a whole that the rule constitutes a basis for the community’s legal system.

== Feminist critiques and gender discrimination ==
Feminist scholars have challenged both the accepted catalogue of peremptory norms and the methods used to identify them. In 1993, Hilary Charlesworth and Christine Chinkin argued that the doctrine has privileged harms associated with male experience while excluding sexual equality, reproductive freedom and endemic violence against women. In 2021, Mary Hansel argued that the International Law Commission's positivist identification methodology lacked clear benchmarks, comprehensive evidentiary assessments and consistent rules for weighting evidence, allowing discretionary choices to appear objective and facilitating the exclusion of feminist priorities. In 2022, Patricia Viseur Sellers highlighted Hansel's research and analysis concerning the ILC's exclusion of gender discrimination and its treatment of CEDAW reservations, while adding examples concerning state objections to and withdrawals of reservations and international criminal law jurisprudence.

== Examples ==
There have been frequent assertions by judges, states, and others that certain principles of law are so fundamental as to be considered jus cogens. For example, there are the principles of Articles 1 and 2 of the United Nations Charter, which guarantee the sovereignty of states. There are also some human rights that are claimed to be protected by rules of jus cogens.

=== Execution of juvenile offenders ===
In 1987, the Inter-American Commission on Human Rights found there to be a norm of jus cogens forbidding the imposition of capital punishment on juvenile offenders. The later case of Michael Domingues v. United States provides an example of an international body's opinion that a particular norm is of a jus cogens nature. Michael Domingues had been convicted and sentenced to death in Nevada, United States for two murders committed when he was 16 years old. Domingues brought the case in front of the Inter-American Commission on Human Rights which delivered a non-legally binding report. The United States argued that there was no jus cogens norm that "establishes eighteen years as the minimum age at which an offender can receive a sentence of death". The Commission concluded that there was a "jus cogens norm not to impose capital punishment on individuals who committed their crimes when they had not yet reached 18 years of age".

The United States has since banned the execution of juvenile offenders. Although not necessarily in response to the above non-binding report, the Supreme Court cited evolving international norms as one of the reasons for the ban (Roper v. Simmons).

=== Torture ===
The prohibition of torture is a rule of customary international law regarded as jus cogens.

In 2002, the Appeals Chamber of the International Criminal Tribunal for the Former Yugoslavia stated in Prosecutor v. Furundžija that there is a jus cogens for the prohibition against torture. The court has stated:

Clearly, the jus cogens nature of the prohibition against torture articulates the notion that the prohibition has now become one of the most fundamental standards of the international community. Furthermore, this prohibition is designed to produce a deterrent effect, in that it signals to all members of the international community and the individuals over whom they wield authority that the prohibition of torture is an absolute value from which nobody must deviate.

It also stated that every state is entitled "to investigate, prosecute and punish or extradite individuals accused of torture, who are present in a territory under its jurisdiction". The United States Court of Appeals for the Second Circuit stated in Filártiga v. Peña-Irala that "the torturer has become, like the pirate and the slave trader before him, hostis humani generis, an enemy of all mankind".

== See also ==
- Actio popularis
- Natural law
- Customary international law
- Customary international humanitarian law
- Entrenched clause
- Erga omnes
- List of treaties by number of parties
- Universal jurisdiction
