= Customary international law =

Customary law applied between nations

Customary international law consists of international legal obligations arising from established or usual international practices, which are less formal customary expectations of behavior often unwritten as opposed to formal written treaties or conventions. Along with general principles of law and treaties, custom is considered by the International Court of Justice, jurists, the United Nations, and its member states to be among the primary sources of international law.

A wide variety of international legal rules originate as a matter of customary international law including, for example, immunity of visiting foreign heads of state and the principle of non-refoulement. States can be bound by customary international law, regardless of whether the states have codified these laws domestically or through treaties. (Note: E.g., from Article Six of the United States Constitution: "This Constitution, and the Laws of the United States which shall be made in Pursuance thereof; and all Treaties made, or which shall be made, under the Authority of the United States, shall be the supreme Law of the Land; and the Judges in every State shall be bound thereby, any Thing in the Constitution or Laws of any state to the Contrary notwithstanding.")

Some customary international laws rise to the level of jus cogens (no exceptions) through acceptance by the international community as non-derogable rights, while other customary international law may simply be followed by a small group of states.

== Elements of customary international law ==
The International Court of Justice Statute defines customary international law in Article 38(1)(b) as "a general practice accepted as law". This reflects the elements required to show existence of customary international law: (1) "widespread repetition by States of similar international acts over time (state practice) and (2) that the practice is carried out due to a sense of legal obligation rather than, for example, as a matter of habit or convenience (opinio juris).

=== State practice ===
State practice requires that a practice "appears to be sufficiently widespread, representative as well as consistent" showing that a significant number of states have used and relied on the rule in question and the concept has not been rejected by a significant number of states.

There is no legal requirement for state practice to be uniform or for the practice to be long-running, although the ICJ has set a high bar for enforcement in the cases of Anglo-Norwegian Fisheries and North Sea Continental Shelf. There has been legal debate on the length of time necessary to establish custom, with the only prominent view being that the necessary duration varies "according to the nature of the case". The practice is not required to be followed universally by all states, but there must be a "general recognition" by states "whose interests are specially affected".

=== Opinio juris ===
Opinio juris requires that states must view that, in engaging in the particular practice in question, they are conforming to a legal obligation.

The International Court of Justice further held in North Sea Continental Shelf that "not only must the acts concerned amount to a settled practice, but they must also be such, or be carried out in such a way, as to be evidence of a belief that this practice is rendered obligatory by the existence of a rule of law requiring it ... The States concerned must therefore feel that they are conforming to what amounts to a legal obligation." The Court emphasised the need to prove a "sense of legal duty" as distinct from "acts motivated by considerations of courtesy, convenience or tradition". This was subsequently confirmed in Nicaragua v. United States of America.

A committee of the International Law Association has argued that there is a general presumption of opinio juris where state practice is proven, though it may still be necessary to establish opinio juris separately where the practice suggests that the states did not believe they were creating a legal precedent. In such circumstances, the test is whether opinio juris can be proven by the states' failure to protest the relevant practice. Some academics further argue that intention to create customary law can be demonstrated by states including the relevant principle in multiple bilateral and multilateral treaties, suggesting that treaty law can itself be necessary to form customary law.

=== Evidence of customary international law ===
Customary international law may be evidenced in a variety of ways, including through action or failure to act as well as through acts carried out in relation both to other states as well as international organisations. In 1950, the International Law Commission listed the following as forms of evidence: treaties, decisions of national and international courts, national legislation, opinions of national legal advisors, diplomatic correspondence, and practice of international organizations. In 2018, the Commission adopted Conclusions on Identification of Customary International Law with commentaries. The United Nations General Assembly welcomed the Conclusions and encouraged their widest possible dissemination. However, such rules are typically less definite in their formulation, and thus subject to doubt in practice.

The recognition of different customary laws can range from simple bilateral recognition of customary laws to worldwide multilateral recognition. Regional customs can become customary international law in their respective regions, but do not become customary international law for nations outside the region. The existence of bilateral customary law was recognized by the International Court of Justice in the Right of Passage Over Indian Territory case between Portugal and India, in which the court found "no reason why long continued practice between the two states accepted by them as regulating their relations should not form the basis of mutual rights and obligations between the two states".

== Bindingness and exceptions ==
=== The persistent objector doctrine ===
Generally, sovereign nations must consent in order to be bound by a particular treaty or legal norm. However, international customary laws are norms that have become pervasive enough internationally that countries need not consent in order to be bound. In these cases, all that is needed is that the state has not objected to the law. To avoid the being subject to emerging custom of this nature, a state must persistently object to identify that it does not consider subject to any legal obligations arising out of that custom.

This can have significant consequences for treaties, which generally cannot bind non-parties. If any treaty or law has been deemed customary international law, then parties which have not ratified said treaty will be bound to observe its provisions in good faith.. For example, the Vienna Convention on the Law of Treaties is widely described as codifying customary international law concerning treaties.

=== Codification ===
Some international customary laws have been codified through treaties and domestic laws. For example, the laws of war, also known as jus in bello, were long a matter of customary law before they were codified in the Hague Conventions of 1899 and 1907, Geneva Conventions, and other treaties. However, these conventions do not purport to govern all legal matters that may arise during war. Instead, Article 1(2) of Additional Protocol I dictates that customary international law governs legal matters concerning armed conflict not covered by other agreements.

=== Jus cogens ===
A peremptory norm (also called jus cogens, Latin for "compelling law") is a fundamental principle of international law which is accepted by the international community of states as a norm from which no derogation is permitted (non-derogable norms). Thought to be so fundamental that it even invalidates rules drawn from treaty or custom, “norms of this character, therefore, cannot be derogated from by the will of the contracting parties." The adoption of the Vienna Convention on the Law of Treaties (VCLT) in 1969 formally established the concept of jus cogens, defining a peremptory norm as "a norm accepted and recognized by the international community of States as a whole as a norm from which no derogation is permitted and which can be modified only by a subsequent norm of general international law having the same character".

These norms are rooted in natural law principles, and any laws conflicting with it should be considered null and void. Examples include various international crimes: a state violates customary international law if it permits or engages in piracy, slavery, torture, genocide, war of aggression, or crimes against humanity. Historically, the proponents of the idea of peremptory norms invaliding treaty rules were reacting to the abuses of the Nazis during World War II. However, there is no agreed definition of jus cogens, and academics have debated which principles qualify as peremptory norms. The most widely agreed example is the principle of the non-use of force.

Jus cogens and customary international law are not interchangeable. All jus cogens are customary international law through their adoption by states, but not all customary international laws rise to the level of peremptory norms. States can deviate from customary international law by enacting treaties and conflicting laws, but jus cogens are non-derogable.

=== Erga omnes obligations ===
The year following the adoption of the VCLT, the ICJ defined erga omnes obligations as those owed to "the international community as a whole", identifying the illegality of genocide and the protection of human rights as examples of obligations of this character. Where customary or treaty law conflicts with a peremptory norm, it will be considered invalid.

== See also ==
- Customary international humanitarian law
- Customary law
- Crimes against humanity
- Genocide
- Human rights
- Public international law
- International humanitarian law
- International human rights law
- International regulation
- Refugee law
- Rule of law
- Rule according to higher law
- Soft law
- Vienna Convention on the Law of Treaties
