= Fisheries case =

International Court of Justice case on the limits of Norway's territorial waters

Fisheries Case (United Kingdom v. Norway)
- Court: International Court of Justice
- Decided: December 18, 1951

United Kingdom v. Norway [1951] ICJ 3, also known as the Fisheries Case, was the culmination of a dispute, originating in 1933, over how large an area of water surrounding Norway was Norwegian waters (that Norway had exclusive fishing rights to) and how much was 'high seas' (that the UK could fish).

== History ==
On September 28, 1949, the government of the United Kingdom filed suit against the government of Norway, alleging that the manner in which the Norwegian Government had drawn their claim to an exclusive Norwegian fisheries zone in the far north (north of 66° 28.8' North) was incompatible with international law. The dispute centered around the use of 48 fixed points to create baselines from which the Norwegians claimed exclusive fishing rights 4 sea miles seaward, rather than using the actual coastline. The coastal zone concerned in the dispute is long and dotted with fjords and bays, islands, islets and reefs, which make determining the "coast" complex. This area forms an area known as the skjærgaard (literally "rock rampart") and was claimed by Norway as the coast of the mainland.

In 1906, British vessels began to appear in this fishery area. These vessels reappeared in greater numbers from 1908 onward, causing concern among the Norwegian population of this area. There were numerous incidents of seizures of British vessels by Norwegian authorities for violation of fishing rules. On July 12 1935, after numerous incidents, the Norwegian government delimited the Norwegian fisheries zone by decree. Negotiations followed this decree and Norway let it be known that they would not strongly enforce the decree during negotiations. This changed in 1948, when considerable number of British trawlers were arrested, and continued in 1949. It was then that the British government instituted proceedings before the court.

== Arguments ==
=== United Kingdom ===
As summarized in the decision of the court, the United Kingdom put forth 14 principles that it argued should govern the case.

1. Norway is entitled to territorial waters that have a breadth of 4 nautical miles.
2. The outer limit of Norway's territorial waters cannot be more than 4 nmi from some point on the base-line
3. The base-line must be a low water mark on permanently dry land that is part of Norwegian territory or the end of Norwegian territorial waters (as outlined in argument 7). This is subject to exceptions under arguments 4, 9, and 10.
4. If there is a low tide elevation within 4 sea miles of permanently dry land, this can be used as the outer edge of the territorial waters.
5. Norway can claim its bays and fjords as internal waters, as they fall in the international definition of a bay.
6. That the international definition of a bay is as follows "a well-marked indentation, whose penetration inland is in such proportion to the width of its mouth as to constitute the indentation more than a mere curvature of the coast."
7. That an end of a bay for territorial purposes should be delineated "by a line drawn between two natural geographical points where the indentation ceases to have the configuration of a bay."
8. "That a legal strait is any geographical strait which connections two portions of the high seas."
9. a) Norway can claim fjords and sounds that are legally straits on historic grounds. b) If the territorial water claims drawn from these straits overlap, the limit is the outer limit of the overlap. If they do not overlap the limits of the claim follows the outer limits of each claim until they intersect with a straight line between the natural entrance points of the straits, after which the limit is this straight line.
10. "That, in the case of the Vestfjord, the outer limit of Norwegian territorial waters, at the south-westerly end of the fjord is the pecked green line shown on Charts Nos. 8 and 9 of Annex 35 of the Reply."
11. That Norway may claim as internal or territorial waters the waters between the Norwegian mainland and the "island fringe" (i.e. skjærgaard). How to determine this is subject to a series of tests involving the closures of bays, etc.
12. Any waters not falling within any of the conditions above are high seas, and not Norwegian territorial waters.
13. The Norwegian Royal Decree of 12th July 1935 is not enforceable against the UK in any waters not falling under the conditions of arguments 1–11.
14. Norway owes the United Kingdom compensation for the arrest of fishing boats in the waters not covered by arguments 1-11 from 16 September 1948 onward.

The UK made additional conditional arguments if the court found that Norway had no entitlements under arguments 1–13, Norway should be delimited to a designated area submitted by the UK in their argument. They also made conditional arguments if a specific area was found to be internal waters of Norway, certain areas should be treated differently as detailed within the argument.

=== Norway ===
Norway argued is that its delineation of its territorial seas was done in accordance with international law. They also argued that the waters in question consisted of waters to which Norway had historical title.

== Judgment ==
On 18 December 1951, the ICJ decided that Norway's claims to the waters were consistent with international laws concerning the ownership of local sea-space. The court found that neither the method employed for the delimitation by the decree, nor the lines fixed by the decree themselves, were contrary to international law; the first finding being adopted by ten votes to two, and the second by eight votes to four. Three judges, Alvarez, Hackworth and Hsu Mo, appended to the judgment a declaration or an individual opinion stating the particular reasons for which they reached their conclusions; two other judges, Sir Arnold McNair and J. E. Read, appended to the judgment statements of their dissenting opinions.

== See also ==
- List of International Court of Justice cases
