= Confiscation of Russian central bank funds =

International sanctions

Within days of the Russian invasion of Ukraine in February 2022 Western countries moved to freeze Russian Central Bank funds in these countries. (Note: Technically, this was accomplished not by freezing the assets but by making it illegal to engage in any reserve management transactions with the Russian central bank.) This was followed by proposals to permanently confiscate these frozen assets to pay for the reconstruction of Ukraine. As of late 2025, the legality of such expropriation remains untested and heavily disputed.

In March 2023 (prior to the destruction of the Kakhovka Dam) a joint assessment was released by the Government of Ukraine, the World Bank, the European Commission, and the United Nations, estimating the total cost of reconstruction and recovery in Ukraine to be US$411 billion (€383 billion). This could eventually exceed $1 trillion (€911 billion), depending on the course of the war. The Kyiv School of Economics has a project and website dedicated to detailing the damages the war has caused to Ukraine.

The G7 countries plus the European Union announced in May 2023 that the approximately $300 billion (€275 billion) in Russian Central Bank assets that had been frozen in these countries would remain frozen "until Russia pays for the damage it has caused to Ukraine," and this was reaffirmed after the G7 meeting in December, 2023. This constituted about half of the $612 billion (€560 billion) total foreign currency and gold reserves held at that time by the Central Bank of Russia. By late July 2023, the amount of frozen Russian assets held in these countries was estimated at $335 billion (€300 billion). Most frozen assets, by far, reside in Europe ($217 billion (€201 billion) to $230 billion (€210 billion)), with the United States holding just a small portion ($5 billion (€4.5 billion)) and Japan also holding some. Josep Borrell, EU's foreign affairs chief, said he wants EU countries to confiscate the frozen assets to cover the costs of rebuilding Ukraine after the war. Russian deputy foreign minister Alexander Grushko remarked that Borrell's initiative amounted to "complete lawlessness" and said it would hurt Europe if adopted.

Austrian foreign minister Alexander Schallenberg warned that confiscation of Russian assets that does not have a "watertight" justification would be an "enormous setback, and basically a disgrace" for the EU. Russia has threatened to retaliate by confiscating assets owned by the EU.

In October 2024, the G7 countries finalized a plan to loan $50 billion (€47.5 billion) to Ukraine, backed by the more than $3 billion (€2.8 billion) in interest that is earned annually by the frozen assets. The United States will contribute $20 billion (€19 billion) of this, with the remainder coming from the European Union, Britain, Canada and Japan. Belgium's foreign minister, Maxime Prévot, has been reported to have rejected proposals to increase the income earned by the assets by switching to riskier investments.

In February, 2025, three sources told Reuters that Russia has signaled a willingness to use the frozen assets for reconstruction in Ukraine as long as part of it is spent on the one-fifth of the country that Moscow's forces control.

In October 2025, European leaders convened to discuss making an interest-free "reparations loan" of 140 billion euros, or about $165 billion, to Ukraine, financially engineered to make use of the Russian assets without seizing them outright. The loan would be repaid only if Russia compensated Ukraine for the damage caused during the war. The prime minister of Belgium, Bart De Wever, where most of the Russian assets are held, has opposed the idea because of the risk to his country. The U.K, which holds Russian assets valued at around £25 billion ($33.5 billion), is considering a similar scheme. On December 3, 2025, the European Commission published a proposal to use frozen Russian assets — of which approximately €210 billion ($245 billion) are held in Europe — as collateral for an initial €90 billion loan to Ukraine, with the prospect of future increases. On December 12, 2025, EU countries agreed to indefinitely freeze Russian funds held in Europe. This decision means that €210 billion will remain frozen until Russia ceases its military actions in Ukraine and begins to rebuild what has been destroyed. On December 19, 2025, EU leaders agreed to borrow funds to provide Ukraine with €90 billion loan to finance its defence over the next two years, foregoing the immediate use of frozen Russian assets. Instead, the European Commission has been tasked with further developing a so‑called reparations loan based on Russia’s frozen assets, but for now this mechanism has proved unworkable, primarily due to resistance from Belgium, where most of these assets are held.

There is a legal distinction between private assets, such as the yacht of a Russian oligarch, and state assets. Private assets are relatively easy to freeze — for example if it is suggested that the individual has been 'obtaining a benefit from or supporting the government of Russia'.

However, it is much more difficult to seize (confiscate) state assets. Ordinarily, it must first be proven that they constitute the proceeds of crime. Sanctions evasion is such a crime but only the portion of the assets involved in the evasion can be seized. With respect to confiscation of frozen Russian state assets, the difficult problem is how to do it without violating international treaties concerning the protection of cross-border investments, and without violating the principle that laws and regulations cannot be retroactive. Russia's rights also include those under sovereign immunity, which forbids one state from seizing another's property. It is cautioned that doing so could create dangerous precedents. Risks also include aggravating the suspicions of the Global South, to whom it may seem that double standards sometimes apply when the interests of Western countries are at stake, (Note: For example, the West may give this impression when it is seen to react more forcefully to war in Ukraine than to wars that are more distant.) and substantiating the view that the West is turning the international financial system into a weapon of war.

== Euroclear ==
Euroclear Bank, the central securities depository based in Belgium, holds frozen Russian assets variously estimated at €125 billion ($137 billion), €180 billion ($197 billion), and €190 billion ($208 billion). Euroclear generated €3 billion ($3.28 billion) in profits from these assets in the first nine months of 2023. Belgium anticipates 2023 tax revenues of €625 million ($684 million) on the income generated by frozen Russian assets and €1.7 billion ($1.86 billion) in 2024. According to Belgian prime minister Alexander De Croo, 100% of this tax revenue should go directly to Ukraine. This level of taxation falls far short of the level contemplated by the European Commission and others, which are said to involve distributing to Ukraine some portion of the profits generated by the frozen assets. Another European clearinghouse holding frozen Russian assets, Clearstream, is in Luxembourg. Both Belgium and Luxembourg have asked for assurance that they will not be required to bear all the risks that may attend European action against these assets. The argument has been made that using Euroclear to seize Russian assets fuels financial fragmentation by encouraging non-G7 countries to switch to non-Western alternatives to Euroclear, such as China Securities Depository and Clearing Corporation, in order to protect their assets, making it harder to police sanctions on Russia, as well as harder to track financial transactions of groups involved in activities such as terrorism or nuclear proliferation.

== Legality of confiscation of state assets ==
In September 2023, the Renew Democracy Initiative (RDI) released a report (lead author Laurence Tribe) which concluded that Russia's arguments against confiscating its frozen state assets and transferring them to Ukraine have no validity, either practically or under U.S. or international law. According to Tribe, "There is simply no basis for saying Russia can violate Ukraine's sovereignty while invoking its own sovereignty as an inviolable shield." The report argues that confiscation of Russian assets would be permissible under the international doctrine of "countermeasure", according to which an action (such as confiscation) that would ordinarily violate international law is permissible if it is undertaken with the aim of inducing another state to resume compliance with international law and is conducted in accordance with the requirements of the Articles on the Responsibility of States for Internationally Wrongful Acts (ARSIWA), which "are considered by courts and commentators to be in whole or in large part an accurate codification of the customary international law of state responsibility". According to the report, since a strong showing can be made that Russia has violated fundamental international laws, confiscation is an appropriate countermeasure to induce it to comply with its international obligations.

Other organizations have proposed a number of methods that can be used to confiscate the frozen assets, based either on countermeasures or on the enforcement of international judgments against Russia.

On 12 January 2024 Russia was said to be close to initiating legal proceedings to challenge in court the freezing of its frozen central bank assets. Russians believe that such litigation "could last for decades", and in the interim would block any transfer of the assets to Ukraine.

=== Countermeasures must be temporary and reversible ===
An article in Foreign Policy disagrees that confiscating Russian frozen assets and delivering them to Ukraine would constitute a valid countermeasure. It points out that the purpose of a legitimate countermeasure is to induce compliance with international law and not to act as punishment for violations. As such, it must be temporary and capable of being reversed if the violating country resumes its compliance with international law. Confiscation, however, is aimed not at inducing Russia to stop its aggression but at compensating for the injury it has caused. Once Russian assets have been transferred to Ukraine they can no longer be returned to Russia, rendering the countermeasure permanent, and its purpose punitive. This is the prevailing view and it has much support.

Others assert that this errs in its assumption that the sole function of countermeasures is to induce compliance with international law, insisting that this is contradicted by Comment 1 to Article 22 of ARSIWA, which says, 'In certain circumstances, the commission by one State of an internationally wrongful act may justify another State injured by that act in taking non-forcible countermeasures in order to procure its cessation and to achieve reparation for the injury...' (emphasis added). Therefore, according to this argument, the correct dichotomy is not between inducing compliance and achieving reparations, but is between countermeasures that make the injured state whole and those that impose punishment. Consequently, the ARSIWA requirement that countermeasures be reversible 'as far as possible' means that after Russia complies with its obligation to compensate Ukraine for the damage it caused it should no longer face countermeasures. Reversibility does not require that after Russia's compliance its compliance must be undone (by reversing its reparation to Ukraine), according to this argument.

The RDI report responds to the charge that confiscating Russian assets is not reversible by asserting that the countermeasure being taken is a suspension of the sovereign immunity that Russia normally enjoys and insists that the requirement of reversibility does not apply to the frozen assets but to the suspension of immunity, which can be reversed when Russia comes into compliance with its international obligations. Others have agreed, adding that confiscating Russian state assets is analogous to the asset transfers that were done with respect to Iran in 1981, Iraq in 1992, and Afghanistan in 2022. A Stanford Law Review article calls this "...too clever by half. The reversibility requirement cannot be circumvented so easily." Since transferring the assets to Ukraine is not reversible the countermeasure does not serve to induce compliance, undercutting "the very raison d'être of countermeasures doctrine." Reversibility is a key requirement, the article insists, without which there is likely to be a rapidly proliferating unlawfulness bringing many undesirable consequences.

The RDI report claims that even if reversibility referred to the economic effects of the suspension rather than to the suspension itself, the transfer of frozen assets to Russia would still satisfy reversibility since Russia will be placed in the same economic condition it would have been in if no countermeasures had been applied. Let's assume that the frozen assets amount to €300 billion and that by invading Ukraine Russia became obligated under international law to pay reparations to Ukraine for the damage caused, amounting to €800 billion. (Note: United Nations Charter Article 2, paragraph 4 says, "All Members shall refrain in their international relations from the threat or use of force against the territorial integrity or political independence of any State, or in any other manner inconsistent with the Purposes of the United Nations." The UN General Assembly on 2 March 2022 adopted a resolution declaring Russia to be in violation of this provision of the UN Charter. ARSIWA Article 31(1) says, "The responsible State is under an obligation to make full reparation for the injury caused by the internationally wrongful act.") If there had been no freezing of assets, Russia's balance sheet (so to speak) would show a €300 billion asset and an €800 billion liability, with a net economic result of a €500 billion liability. On the other hand, if the frozen assets are transferred to Ukraine, Russia's liability to Ukraine would be reduced by that amount, resulting in the same net €500 billion liability on its balance sheet. Since Russia would thereby be placed in the same economic condition it would have occupied if no countermeasures had been applied this must be seen as consonant with the reversibility requirement, according to the RDI report and others. Looked at in a different way, freezing the €300 billion until Russia has complied with its reparation obligation to Ukraine has the same impact on Russia as transferring the €300 billion directly to Ukraine. According to this line of thinking, if there is a right to hold onto the €300 billion until Russia agrees to give it to Ukraine then it is absurd to say that the doctrine of reversibility is violated if it is transferred directly to Ukraine but it is not violated if the countermeasure is "reversed" and the money is transferred to Russia but under conditions that offset it against an amount that Russia would be required to pay Ukraine, as in one European Commission proposal.

The RDI report adds that countermeasures must be reversible "as far as possible", and that this is not an absolute and inflexible requirement. "Accordingly, even if transfer of Russia's sovereign assets did not fully comport with the reversibility principle, this would be a prime example in which the expectation of reversibility must yield to the more pressing need to pursue a countermeasure that would effectively induce Russia's compliance with international law." However, the Stanford Law Review article claims that the comments to the ARSIWA show that the term "as far as possible" "does not create a loophole" to justify irreversible measures, but requires a state having a choice as to which countermeasure to implement, to choose one that is reversible. On the other hand, it is pointed out that according to James Crawford, former Special Rapporteur of the International Law Commission for the topic State Responsibility, reversibility "needs to be viewed broadly". Others add that while the ARSIWA may have some flexibility on reversibility, it has no flexibility on the requirement that countermeasures be temporary, and confiscation is not temporary.

Another analyst points out that since customary international law can change over time, (Note: A rule, such as one allowing third-party countermeasures, or recognizing as a legitimate countermeasure the confiscation of central bank assets, becomes customary international law if two requirements are met: There is a state practice that "appears to be sufficiently widespread, representative as well as consistent" showing that a significant number of states have used and relied on third-party countermeasures and the concept has not been rejected by a significant number of states.; States were motivated by a belief that they were legally compelled to accept the legitimacy of third-party countermeasures by reason of a rule of customary international law obligating them to do so (opinio juris).) it might be interpreted to already recognize the confiscation of central bank assets under the current circumstances as a legitimate countermeasure or act of collective self-defense. This analyst also suggests that resolutions of the UN General Assembly could be taken as evidence that such an action is already a recognized state practice. The RDI report agrees with this, adding that "norms of accepted state practice arise suddenly during moments at which the system is under great stress" and that U.N. General Assembly resolutions can "crystallize emerging customs" and serve as "evidence of a new rule of customary international law", citing Michael Scharf.

=== Legality of third party countermeasures ===
Another argument against the RDI analysis concerns the right in international law of third party states, such as EU countries, to apply countermeasures at all. As a result of significant risks of abuse associated with the use of third-party countermeasures, and strong opposition in the International Law Commission during the drafting of the ARSIWA, "The ARSIWA do not directly address whether non-injured states invoking the responsibility of a breaching state...can take countermeasures." (Note: The cited Stanford Law Review article points out that while ARSIWA Article 48(1) says that it is permissible for a third-party state to make claims on another state, including claims for reparation, when "acting in the interest of the injured party", and while ARSIWA Article 54 allows third-party states "to take lawful measures against that State to ensure cessation of the breach and reparation in the interest of the injured State or of the beneficiaries of the obligation breached", this falls short of authorizing third-party countermeasures. Third party states would be limited to those remedies available under Article 48, which would be to make claims for cessation of the internationally wrongful act, and for non-repetition and/or reparation, but unless such actions qualified as countermeasures they would not be protected by Article 22 from charges of wrongfulness, as legitimate countermeasures are. See the discussion starting on page 51. See also the commentary to Chapter II of Part Three of the ARSIWA (dealing with countermeasures), para. 8, which says, "This chapter does not purport to regulate the taking of countermeasures by States other than the injured State".) However, though this is disputed by some, it is widely believed that even if it is not expressly sanctioned in the ARSIWA, a rule has emerged under customary international law entitling third party states to apply countermeasures to enforce compliance with erga omnes ("owed to the international community as a whole") obligations. Once such a rule emerges, a war of aggression would violate an erga omnes obligation, giving third party states such rights. (Note: It is also asserted that third-party (i.e., collective) actions against Russia are authorized by Article 51 of the U.N Charter: "Nothing in the present Charter shall impair the inherent right of individual or collective self-defense if an armed attack occurs against a Member of the United Nations, until the Security Council has taken measures necessary to maintain international peace and security." (emphasis added); and by Article 1 of the U.N. Charter: "The Purposes of the United Nations are: . . . to maintain international peace and security, and to that end: to take effective collective measures for the prevention and removal of threats to the peace, and for the suppression of acts of aggression or other breaches of the peace."(emphasis added))

Some analysts believe that since Russia defied the International Court of Justice (ICJ) order that the "Russian Federation shall immediately suspend the military operations that it commenced on 24 February 2022 in the territory of Ukraine," and also defied a U.N. General Assembly emergency resolution condemning its invasion and demanding immediate withdrawal, therefore third-party states are entitled for those reasons to take countermeasures in order to bring Russia into international compliance. Others respond that neither of these is an authoritative and conclusive determination. The ICJ ruling, it is argued, was preliminary. Furthermore, if General Assembly resolutions can substitute for Security Council decisions does that mean that the many General Assembly resolutions declaring Israel to be an international outlaw are sufficient to authorize states to ignore Israel's rights with impunity under international law?

=== Legality of countermeasures to enforce obligation to pay reparations ===
The obligation to pay reparations is not, or may not be, an erga omnes obligation, rendering dubious the legitimacy of countermeasures by third party states to enforce an obligation to pay reparations. In addition, the leading treatise on the question of third-party countermeasures concluded that, with one possible exception, "third-party countermeasures have simply not been adopted to obtain any form of reparation". Other legal analysts have presented arguments in favor of the legitimacy of countermeasures by third party states "aimed at stopping the ongoing failure to meet the obligation to make reparations" (but without confiscation). (Note: These are arguments that support freezing Russian assets until the Russians agree to pay reparations.)

== Legality of confiscation of income of frozen assets ==
The EU has concluded that it "can't legally confiscate outright frozen Russian assets", (Note: According to the Financial Times on 15 December 2023, a US government discussion paper being circulated in G7 committees argued that "G7 members and other specially affected states could seize Russian sovereign assets as a countermeasure to induce Russia to end its aggression.") but the annual profits from the investment of those assets is expected to be around €3 billion (US$3.4 billion) and a "windfall profits tax" on those profits is being investigated. European Commission President Ursula von der Leyen said on 22 June 2023 that before mid-July they would come up with a proposal on how to use these frozen assets to benefit Ukraine, but this was later postponed until September, and then until year-end. On 12 December the European Commission announced that it had agreed on a legal way to use the interest and profits of the frozen assets to benefit Ukraine, but did not immediately disclose its contents. It could potentially make up to €3 billion ($3.25 billion) per year available to Ukraine. Such a plan must be approved by the European Parliament as well as all 27 member states and is expected to receive opposition from some states, such as France, Germany, Italy and Hungary. The G7 has also backed the idea of finding a way to access the frozen assets to benefit Ukraine.

Those arguing that it is an illegitimate countermeasure to confiscate Russian assets and deliver them to Ukraine for purposes of reparations also argue that the same principle governs investing the frozen assets and turning over investment gains to Ukraine, with one analyst saying "...the European Commission's proposed extraction of investment returns from frozen assets—investing the frozen assets and seizing their earnings—is fundamentally confiscatory. ...The prime international legal barrier these proposals fail to overcome is the customary international legal principle of sovereign immunity," since it does not qualify as a valid countermeasure or as any of the other "circumstances precluding wrongfulness" provided in the ARSIWA. (Note: Sovereign immunity protects states from outright seizures of sovereign assets. As the comments to ARSIWA Part Two Chapter V make clear, another state seizing such assets would expose itself to a well-founded claim for the breach of an international obligation unless it is able to raise a shield to such claims, which can be accomplished if any one of six "circumstances precluding wrongfulness" is present: consent (art. 20); self-defense (art. 21); countermeasures (art. 22); force majeure (art. 23); distress (art. 24); necessity (art. 25); See the Stanford Law Review article, starting on page 33, for a discussion of "(Failed) Arguments for Overcoming Sovereign Immunity".) Some analysts claim that confiscating just the income or interest on the frozen funds would not violate the requirement that countermeasures be reversible. The proposal announced 12 December 2023 by the European Commission to use the interest and profits to benefit Ukraine was said to take the position that these revenues "do not constitute sovereign assets and do not have to be made available to the Central Bank of Russia under applicable rules", and therefore delivering them to Ukraine would not violate the reversibility requirement.

== Other concerns ==
=== Effects on currencies ===
Christine Lagarde, president of the European Central Bank, which takes a view opposite that of the European Commission concerning the risks of using these profits for the benefit of Ukraine, warned the European Union that taking action against frozen Russian assets could endanger the eurozone's financial stability and weaken the standing of the euro as a reserve currency, arguing that the negative consequences to the EU could exceed the amount generated for Ukraine. Many international law experts believe that Ukraine's best chance against Russian assets lies in a favorable end to the war with Russia, after which its claim for reparations under international law would be clear.

The RDI report argues that the claim that such an action could weaken a particular national currency has no force if all the major currencies take the same action. "The idea is to do this multilaterally. ...If others didn't, there might be a flight from the dollar. But if it is done by all the major currencies, where are people going to move their money?" According to other financial analysts, if non-western governments were going to pull their currency reserves out of the west they would have done so (a) when the west blocked Russia's access to its foreign exchange reserves, and (b) when the G7 announced that the block will remain in force until Russia pays reparation to Ukraine. The reality is that Russia's ability to access the frozen funds is forever gone, and it is unclear why delivering the funds to Ukraine would damage the international financial world in ways that haven't already materialized. Data from the European Central Bank and the U.S. Federal Reserve since the freezing of Russia's assets show that there has been no meaningful move away from the dollar. In the second quarter of 2023, 89.2% of all currency reserves were held in U.S., EU, Japanese and British currencies.

=== Precedent ===
The RDI report claims that "any concern that confiscating Russia's assets will set a dangerous precedent if similar circumstances arise in the future rests on an assumption that conduct analogous to Russia's has occurred with frequency in the modern era or will in fact recur. On the contrary, Russia's war in Ukraine may well be unprecedented since the Second World War." Others ask how, once Russia's assets have been seized, Western democracies will be able to convince China or India, sometime in the future, that they have no right to confiscate whatever assets they wish.

A conclusion similar to that of the RDI report was reached by Lawrence Summers, who believes that the G7 should be moving collectively to use Russian state assets to finance the ongoing expenses in Ukraine made necessary by Russia's aggressive war. According to Summers, that is what the Russians did with respect to the Germans and the Japanese after World War II, it's what the U.S. did with respect to Saddam Hussein during the Iraq war, and there is ample legal precedent. He said that it would set a "healthy precedent" if countries committing aggression against their neighbors stand to lose state assets.

Others have maintained that it must not be forgotten that Russia is guilty of using a war of aggression to destroy Ukraine, its people and its culture, and to erase it from the map, and that since 1945 there have been few, if any, breaches of international law as serious as this. To argue that under these circumstances seizing Russia's sovereign assets would undermine the international financial system is to argue that foreign reserves must be safe from seizure no matter what, and is like arguing that if real estate in London that represents the proceeds of crime is not free from the threat of seizure by the government, then all real estate in London has lost its security.

=== Russian retaliation ===
The RDI report argues that a Russian threat to retaliate against the assets of any state announcing an intention to seize Russian assets overlooks the fact that because Russia is not a financial center and the ruble is not a reserve currency, Russia does not hold the sovereign funds of other countries. It would have to resort to seizing private assets of European and U.S. companies but most such companies fled from Russia after its invasion of Ukraine and Russia has already seized their assets. Tribe argues that given that "we have already frozen Russian assets and declared Vladimir Putin a war criminal, it is inconceivable that these assets would ever be unfrozen except to finance the reconstruction of Ukraine", so we might as well get on with it.

It has also been argued that the value of foreign assets in Russia that are subject to retaliation would have already been reduced as a result of the risks of being in Russia to begin with. Furthermore, it is asked to what extent essential foreign policy interests should give way in order to protect the value of assets whose owners have not taken advantage of the two years they have had to remove their assets from Russia.

On December 12, 2025, the Central Bank of Russia announced its decision to initiate legal proceedings against Euroclear in a Russian court. The central bank stated that Euroclear's actions had caused it damages by depriving the Russian regulator of the ability to manage its own cash and securities. The claimed damages amounted to 18.2 trillion rubles (equivalent to €195.54 billion or $229.05 billion at the Central Bank's exchange rate as of December 12) and consist of frozen central bank funds, the value of blocked securities, and lost profits. On May 15, 2026, the Moscow Arbitration Court granted the claim.

=== Competing claims against the frozen assets ===
The strength of Ukraine's claim against the frozen assets would be diminished if Russia and Ukraine were to negotiate an end to hostilities that did not include reparations for Ukraine, or included an amount less than the value of the frozen Russian assets. In that case, Russia would have a claim for their return. Furthermore, there may be judgment creditors of Russia with claims that would have a higher priority than those of Ukraine, or who could at least delay reparations to Ukraine until the conclusion of litigation. Therefore, it has been suggested that the frozen funds should be transferred to an international entity that would be as insulated as possible from all claims except those of Ukraine. The RDI report suggests that the frozen assets be transferred to an international fund analogous to the United Nations Compensation Commission (UNCC) that was set up to handle the transfer of Iraqi state funds to Kuwait after Iraqi invasion of Kuwait in 1990. (Note: One difficulty is that the UNCC was set up pursuant to United Nations Security Council Resolution 692 but Russia can veto any such Security Council resolution, and while the General Assembly has passed a resolution requiring Russia to pay reparations, it lacks the authority to require Russia's acceptance of any reparations entity that it might establish. A reparations process modeled after the UNCC but designed to circumvent the Security Council has been developed by Cambridge University’s Thomas Grant, working with the New Lines Institute. In February 2022 Iraq paid the last of $52.4 billion (€47.9 billion) to compensate for losses as a result of its invasion and occupation of Kuwait.)

=== Use to which confiscated assets would be put ===
The justification for confiscating Central Bank of Russia assets is found in Article 31 of the ARSIWA which says, "The responsible State is under an obligation to make full reparation for the injury caused by the internationally wrongful act." However, if confiscated Russian assets are used not to repair any injury suffered but instead to fund arms supplies to Ukraine, then Russia and its sympathizers could maintain that the confiscation did not constitute reparations but was instead a penalty, which does not qualify as a legitimate countermeasure under ARSIWA, entitling Russia to reparations under Article 31 for the amount unjustly confiscated.

== See also ==
- 2022 Russian debt default – Credit crisis in Russia in 2022
- 2022–2023 Russia–European Union gas dispute – Fossil fuel financing-related conflicts
- Russia–Ukraine gas disputes – Disputes between Naftogaz Ukrayiny and Gazprom
  - Naftogaz § 2026 seizure of Russian state assets to compensate Naftogaz
  - Oschadbank § Legal proceedings against Russia
- Afghan frozen assets
- Countering America's Adversaries Through Sanctions Act – 2017 U.S. law sanctioning Iran, North Korea and Russia
- Economy of Ukraine
- International Emergency Economic Powers Act – United States federal law
- International sanctions during the Russo-Ukrainian War
- International sanctions during apartheid
- International sanctions during the Venezuelan crisis – Sanctions during the crisis in Venezuela
- List of companies that applied sanctions during the Russo-Ukrainian War
- List of military aid to Ukraine during the Russo-Ukrainian War
- Magnitsky Act – 2012 United States federal law
- Russian financial crisis (2014–2016) – Period of devaluation of the Russian rouble, linked to the Crimean conflict
- Specially Designated Nationals and Blocked Persons List – US sanctions list
- Trading with the Enemy Act of 1917 – U.S. law important
- United States sanctions – Trade restrictions levied by the United States government
- Ural Airlines Flight 1383 – 2023 aviation incident in Russia, that was at first speculated to be due to sanctions against Russia
- Yermak-McFaul Expert Group on Russian Sanctions – Zelenskyy administration investigations team formed to counter Ukraine's invasion
