= Internet security =

Branch of computer security

Internet security is a branch of computer security focused on the Internet. It includes browser security, web application security, and network security as it applies to other applications or operating systems as a whole. Its objective is to establish rules and measures to improve Internet safety and Internet privacy, including to protect against cyberattacks and cybercrime. The Internet is an inherently insecure channel for information exchange, with risk of intrusion and Internet fraud, including phishing, viruses, trojans, ransomware and worms.

Many countermeasures are used to combat Internet security threats and web threats, including encryption and ground-up engineering.

== Threats ==
=== Malicious software ===
Malicious software comes in many forms, such as viruses, Trojan horses, spyware, and worms.

- Malware, a portmanteau of malicious software, is any software used to disrupt computer operation, gather sensitive information, or gain access to private computer systems. Malware is defined by its malicious intent, acting against the requirements of the computer user, and does not include software that unintentionally causes harm due to some deficiency. The term badware applies to both malware and unintentionally harmful software.
- A botnet is a network of computers that have been taken over by a robot or bot that performs large-scale malicious acts for its creator.
- Computer viruses are programs that can replicate their structures or effects by infecting other files or structures on a computer. The typical purpose of a virus is to take over a computer to steal data.
- Computer worms are programs that can replicate themselves throughout a computer network.
- Ransomware is a type of malware that restricts access to the computer system that it infects, and demands a ransom in order for the restriction to be removed.
- Scareware is a program of usually limited or no benefit, containing malicious payloads, that is sold via unethical marketing practices. The selling approach uses social engineering to cause shock, anxiety, or the perception of a threat, generally directed at an unsuspecting user.
- Spyware refers to programs that surreptitiously monitor activity on a computer system and report that information to others without the user's consent.
- One particular kind of spyware is key logging malware. Often referred to as keylogging or keyboard capturing, is the action of recording (logging) the keys struck on a keyboard.
- A Trojan horse, commonly known as a Trojan, is a general term for malware that pretends to be harmless, so that a user will be convinced to download it onto the computer.

=== Denial-of-service attacks ===
A denial-of-service attack (DoS) or distributed denial-of-service attack (DDoS) is an attempt to make a computer resource unavailable to its intended users. It works by making so many service requests at once that the system is overwhelmed and becomes unable to process any of them. DoS may target cloud computing systems. According to business participants in an international security survey, 25% of respondents experienced a DoS attack in 2007 and another 16.8% in 2010. DoS attacks often use bots (or a botnet) to carry out the attack.

=== Phishing ===
Phishing targets online users in an attempt to extract sensitive information such as passwords and financial information. Phishing occurs when the attacker pretends to be a trustworthy entity, either via email or a web page. Victims are directed to web pages that appear to be legitimate, but instead route information to the attackers. Tactics such as email spoofing attempt to make emails appear to be from legitimate senders, or long complex URLs hide the actual website. Insurance group RSA claimed that phishing accounted for worldwide losses of $10.8 billion in 2016. Attackers may use AI to create more convincing phishing attacks, such as deepfakes with audio or video that seem to be real messages from a trusted person but are actually fake.

=== Man in the middle ===
A man-in-the-middle (MITM) attack is a type of cyber attack. Cybercriminals can intercept data sent between people to steal, eavesdrop or modify data for certain malicious purposes, such as extorting money and identity theft. Public WiFi is often insecure because monitoring or intercepting Web traffic is unknown.

=== Application vulnerabilities ===
Applications used to access Internet resources may contain security vulnerabilities such as memory safety bugs or flawed authentication checks. Such bugs can give network attackers full control over the computer.

== Countermeasures ==
=== Network layer security ===
TCP/IP protocols may be secured with cryptographic methods and security protocols. These protocols include Secure Sockets Layer (SSL), succeeded by Transport Layer Security (TLS) for web traffic, Pretty Good Privacy (PGP) for email, and IPsec for network layer security.

=== Threat modeling ===
Threat modeling tools help people to proactively analyze the cyber security posture of a system or system of systems and in that way prevent security threats.

=== Multi-factor authentication ===
Multi-factor authentication (MFA) is an access control method in which a user is granted access only after successfully presenting separate pieces of evidence to an authentication mechanism – two or more from the following categories: knowledge (something they know), possession (something they have), and inference (something they are). Internet resources, such as websites and email, may be secured using this technique.

=== Security token ===
Some online sites offer customers the ability to use a six-digit code which randomly changes every 30–60 seconds on a physical security token. The token has built-in computations and manipulates numbers based on the current time. This means that every thirty seconds only a certain array of numbers validate access. The website is made aware of that device's serial number and knows the computation and correct time to verify the number. After 30–60 seconds the device presents a new random six-digit number to log into the website.

=== Electronic mail security ===
==== Background ====
Email messages are composed, delivered, and stored in a multiple step process, which starts with the message's composition. When a message is sent, it is transformed into a standard format according to RFC 2822. Using a network connection, the mail client sends the sender's identity, the recipient list and the message content to the server. Once the server receives this information, it forwards the message to the recipients.

==== Pretty Good Privacy (PGP) ====
Pretty Good Privacy provides confidentiality by encrypting messages to be transmitted or data files to be stored using an encryption algorithm such as Triple DES or CAST-128. Email messages can be protected by using cryptography in various ways, such as the following:

- Digitally signing the message to ensure its integrity and confirm the sender's identity.
- Encrypting the message body of an email message to ensure its confidentiality.
- Encrypting the communications between mail servers to protect the confidentiality of both message body and message header.

The first two methods, message signing and message body encryption, are often used together; however, encrypting the transmissions between mail servers is typically used only when two organizations want to protect emails regularly sent between them. For example, the organizations could establish a virtual private network (VPN) to encrypt communications between their mail servers. Unlike methods that only encrypt a message body, a VPN can encrypt all communication over the connection, including email header information such as senders, recipients, and subjects. However, a VPN does not provide a message signing mechanism, nor can it provide protection for email messages along the entire route from sender to recipient.

==== Message Authentication Code ====
A Message authentication code (MAC) is a cryptography method that uses a secret key to digitally sign a message. This method outputs a MAC value that can be decrypted by the receiver, using the same secret key used by the sender. The Message Authentication Code protects both a message's data integrity as well as its authenticity.

=== Firewalls ===
A computer firewall controls access to a single computer. A network firewall controls access to an entire network. A firewall is a security device — computer hardware or software — that filters traffic and blocks outsiders. It generally consists of gateways and filters. Firewalls can also screen network traffic and block traffic deemed unauthorized.

==== Web security ====
Firewalls restrict incoming and outgoing network packets. Only authorized traffic is allowed to pass through it. Firewalls create checkpoints between networks and computers. Firewalls can block traffic based on IP source and TCP port number. They can also serve as the platform for IPsec. Using tunnel mode, firewalls can implement VPNs. Firewalls can also limit network exposure by hiding the internal network from the public Internet.

==== Types of firewall ====
===== Packet filter =====
A packet filter processes network traffic on a packet-by-packet basis. Its main job is to filter traffic from a remote IP host, so a router is needed to connect the internal network to the Internet. The router is known as a screening router, which screens packets leaving and entering the network.

===== Stateful packet inspection =====
In a stateful firewall the circuit-level gateway is a proxy server that operates at the network level of an Open Systems Interconnect (OSI) model and statically defines what traffic will be allowed. Circuit proxies forward network packets (formatted data) containing a given port number, if the port is permitted by the algorithm. The main advantage of a proxy server is its ability to provide Network Address Translation (NAT), which can hide the user's IP address from the Internet, effectively protecting internal information from the outside.

===== Application-level gateway =====
An application-level firewall is a third-generation firewall where a proxy server operates at the very top of the OSI model, the IP suite application level. A network packet is forwarded only if a connection is established using a known protocol. Application-level gateways are notable for analyzing entire messages rather than individual packets.

=== Browser choice ===
Web browser market share predicts the share of hacker attacks. For example, Internet Explorer 6, which used to lead the market, was heavily attacked.

== Protections ==
=== User awareness ===
As cyberthreats become more complex, user education is essential for improving internet security. Important areas of attention consist of:

- Users should have the ability to spot phishing emails by looking for odd sender addresses, cliched salutations, and language that seems urgent. Both simulated phishing exercises and real-world examples can be incorporated into training programs.
- Enabling two-factor authentication (2FA) and stressing the usage of strong, one-of-a-kind passwords are essential for protecting personal information. Additionally, users need to understand the dangers of oversharing on social media and how crucial it is to change their privacy settings.
- It's critical to educate people on how to spot secure websites (search for HTTPS), steer clear of dubious downloads, and use caution when clicking links. Also, users need to be aware of the dangers of utilizing open WiFi networks without a VPN.

=== Antivirus ===
Antivirus software can protect a programmable device by detecting and eliminating malware. A variety of techniques are used, such as signature-based, heuristics, rootkit, and real-time.

=== Password managers ===
A password manager is a software application that creates, stores and provides passwords to applications. Password managers encrypt passwords. The user only needs to remember a single master password to access the store.

=== Security suites ===
Security suites were first offered for sale in 2003 (McAfee) and contain firewalls, anti-virus, anti-spyware and other components. They also offer theft protection, portable storage device safety check, private Internet browsing, cloud anti-spam, a file shredder or make security-related decisions (answering popup windows) and several were free of charge.

== See also ==
- Cybersecurity information technology list
- Cyberspace Electronic Security Act (in the US)
- Identity driven networking
- Internet Crime Complaint Center
- Internet safety
- Network security policy
- Usability of web authentication systems
- Web literacy (Security)
