= Dual-homed =

Computer network technique

Dual-homed or dual-homing can refer to either an Ethernet device that has more than one network interface, for redundancy purposes, or in firewall technology, one of the firewall architectures for implementing preventive security.

An example of dual-homed devices are enthusiast computing motherboards that incorporate dual Ethernet network interface cards.

== Usage ==
In Ethernet LANs, dual-homing is a network topology whereby a networked device is built with more than one network interface. Each interface or port is connected to the network, but only one connection is active at a time. The other connection is activated only if the primary connection fails. Traffic is quickly rerouted to the backup connection in the event of link failure. This feature was designed to provide telecommunications-grade reliability and redundancy to Ethernet networks. Multihoming is a more general category, referring to a device having more than one network connection.

== In firewalls ==
Firewall dual-homing provides the first-line defense and protection technology for keeping untrusted bodies from compromising information security by violating trusted network space.

A dual-homed host (or dual-homed gateway) is a system fitted with two network interface controllers (NICs) that sits between an untrusted network (like the Internet) and trusted network (such as a corporate network) to provide secure access. Dual-homed is a general term for proxies, gateways, firewalls, or any server that provides secured applications or services directly to an untrusted network.

Dual-homed hosts can be seen as a special case of bastion hosts and multi-homed hosts. They fall into the category of application-based firewalls.

Dual-homed hosts can act as firewalls provided that they do not forward IP datagrams unconditionally.

Other firewall architectures include the network-layer firewall types screening router, screened-host, and screened subnet.

== See also ==
- Multihoming
- Firewall (computing)
- Router (computing)
