= Circuit-level gateway =

Type of firewall in computing

A circuit-level gateway is a type of firewall.

Circuit-level gateways work at the session layer of the OSI model, or as a "shim-layer" between the application layer and the transport layer of the TCP/IP stack. They monitor TCP handshaking between packets to determine whether a requested session is legitimate. Information passed to a remote computer through a circuit-level gateway appears to have originated from the gateway. Firewall traffic is cleaned based on particular session rules and may be controlled to acknowledged computers only. Circuit-level firewalls conceal the details of the protected network from the external traffic, which is helpful for interdicting access to impostors. Circuit-level gateways are relatively inexpensive and have the advantage of hiding information about the private network they protect. However, they do not filter individual packets.

== See also ==
- Application firewall
- Application-level gateway firewall
- Bastion host
- Dual-homed
