= Countermeasure (law) =

Enforcement mechanism in international law

Countermeasure in public international law refers to reprisals (Note: According the comments to Chapter II of Part Three of the ARSIWA (dealing with countermeasures): "As to terminology, traditionally the term 'reprisals' was used to cover otherwise unlawful action, including forcible action, taken by way of self-help in response to a breach. More recently, the term 'reprisals' has been limited to action taken in time of international armed conflict; i.e. it has been taken as equivalent to belligerent reprisals. The term 'countermeasures' covers that part of the subject of reprisals not associated with armed conflict, and in accordance with modern practice and judicial decisions the term is used in that sense in this chapter.") not involving the use of force. In other words, it refers to non-violent acts which are illegal in themselves, but become legal when executed by one state in response to the commission of an earlier internationally wrongful act by another state in order to induce that state to comply with its legal obligations.

== Definition ==
Under the doctrine of countermeasures, a state that has been injured by an internationally wrongful act may take an action that would otherwise be unlawful (the countermeasure) against the state that committed the wrongful act in order to induce that state to comply with its legal obligations. The Articles on the Responsibility of States for Internationally Wrongful Acts (ARSIWA), "are considered by courts and commentators to be in whole or in large part an accurate codification of the customary international law of state responsibility." Chapter V of Part Two of the ARSIWA describes six circumstances, if any of which is present, will preclude the wrongfulness of conduct that otherwise would render the state liable for breach of an international obligation. (Note: For example, sovereign immunity protects states from outright seizures of sovereign assets. As the comments to ARSIWA Part Two Chapter V make clear, another state seizing such assets would expose itself to a well-founded claim for the breach of an international obligation unless it is able to raise a shield to such claims, which can be accomplished if any one of six "circumstances precluding wrongfulness" is present: consent (art. 20); self-defense (art. 21); countermeasures (art. 22); force majeure (art. 23); distress (art. 24); necessity (art. 25)) One of these is Article 22, which states that the wrongfulness of a countermeasure action is precluded if it is taken in accordance with Chapter II of Part Three of the ARSIWA (Articles 49 through 54), which deals with countermeasures. Therefore, a validly executed countermeasure renders wrongful conduct legal under international law so long as the necessary conditions for taking countermeasures are satisfied. These conditions are designed to ensure that countermeasures are restricted to the requirements of the situation and that there will be adequate safeguards against abuse, and they are described in the comments to Chapter II of Part Three:

- Countermeasures must be "non-forcible (art. 50, para. 1 (a))."
- Countermeasures must be "directed at the responsible state and not at third parties (art. 49, paras. 1 and 2)."
- Since they are intended "to procure cessation of and reparation for" an "internationally wrongful act and not by way of punishment", countermeasures must be "temporary in character and must be as far as possible reversible in their effects in terms of future legal relations between the two states (arts. 49, paras. 2 and 3, and 53)."
- The injured state must have already "called upon the state committing the wrongful act to discontinue its wrongful conduct or to make reparation", but the request was refused. (art. 52, para. 1).
- Countermeasures "must be proportionate (art. 51)."
- Countermeasures "must not involve any departure from certain basic obligations (art. 50, para. 1)," in particular obligations concerning threat of force, protection of fundamental human rights, and "peremptory norms of international law".

== Third-Party Countermeasures ==
Third-party countermeasures concern the rights of a non-injured state to invoke state responsibility in order to cause another state to be held responsible for a breach of an international obligation and obligated to pay reparations. For example, in the case of the Russian invasion of Ukraine, a European country in possession of funds belonging to Russia might wish to freeze those funds until Russia agrees to cease its aggression against Ukraine and pay reparations.

As a result of significant risks of abuse associated with the use of third-party countermeasures, and strong opposition in the International Law Commission during the drafting of the ARSIWA, "The ARSIWA do not directly address whether non-injured states invoking the responsibility of a breaching state...can take countermeasures." According to a Stanford Law Review article, while ARSIWA Article 48(1) says that it is permissible for a third-party state to make claims on another state, including claims for reparation, when "acting in the interest of the injured party", and while ARSIWA Article 54 (Note: The ARSIWA are a compilation of the customary international law of state responsibility that has developed over the years, and according to the comments to Article 54, para. 6, at the time of their drafting (2001) there was insufficient evidence in international law that a third-party right to take countermeasures had been established, so in a compromise Article 54 was added as a "saving clause" to be used if and when such a right became established under customary international law.) allows third-party states "to take lawful measures against that State to ensure cessation of the breach and reparation in the interest of the injured State or of the beneficiaries of the obligation breached", this falls short of authorizing third-party countermeasures. This is further made clear by the commentary to Chapter II of Part Three of the ARSIWA (dealing with countermeasures), para. 8, which says, "This chapter does not purport to regulate the taking of countermeasures by States other than the injured State". Without access to countermeasures as an enforcement action, third party states would be limited to those remedies available under Article 48, which would be to make claims for cessation of the internationally wrongful act, and for non-repetition and/or reparation, but they would not be able to wield more potent weapons, such as the freezing of funds in their possession, since this would not be protected by Article 22 from charges of wrongfulness, as legitimate countermeasures are.

However, it is widely believed that a rule has emerged under customary international law (Note: A rule, such as one allowing third-party countermeasures, becomes customary international law if two requirements are met: There is a state practice that "appears to be sufficiently widespread, representative as well as consistent" showing that a significant number of states have used and relied on third-party countermeasures and the concept has not been rejected by a significant number of states.; States were motivated by a belief that they were legally compelled to accept the legitimacy of third-party countermeasures by reason of a rule of customary international law obliging them to do so (opinio juris).) entitling third-party states to apply countermeasures to enforce compliance with erga omnes ("owed to the international community as a whole") obligations. Once such a rule emerges, a war of aggression would violate an erga omnes obligation, giving third party states the right to take countermeasures against the aggressor state.

Some legal analysts believe that since Russia defied the International Court of Justice order that the "Russian Federation shall immediately suspend the military operations that it commenced on 24 February 2022 in the territory of Ukraine", third-party states are entitled for that reason to take countermeasures in order to bring Russia into international compliance.

=== Reparations ===
The question remains whether the obligation to pay reparations is an erga omnes obligation, supporting a right of third-party states to implement countermeasures. Some legal analysts believe that it is not (though it arises from a breach of one), while others say that it may not be, rendering dubious the legitimacy of countermeasures by third party states to enforce an obligation to pay reparations. In addition, the leading treatise on the question of third-party countermeasures concluded that, "third-party countermeasures have simply not been adopted to obtain any form of reparation". On the other hand, other legal analysts have presented arguments in favor of the legitimacy of countermeasures by third party states "aimed at stopping the ongoing failure to meet the obligation to make reparations".

=== Confiscation of assets ===
One potential countermeasure would be for a state to freeze assets in its possession until the state at fault complies with its international obligations. The question arises as to whether it would be a legitimate countermeasure for a third-party state to outright confiscate assets in its possession and deliver them to the wronged state as reparations. An article in Foreign Policy points out that the purpose of a countermeasure is to induce compliance with international law and not to act as punishment for violations. As such, a countermeasure must be temporary and capable of being reversed if the violating country resumes its compliance with international law. However, once assets have been transferred to the wronged state this can no longer be reversed, rendering the countermeasure permanent, and its purpose punitive. This is the prevailing view and it has much support.

In September 2023, the Renew Democracy Initiative (RDI) released a report (lead author Laurence Tribe) which asserted that, with respect to the confiscation of Russian assets, the countermeasure being taken is a suspension of the sovereign immunity that Russia normally enjoys. The report insists that the requirement of reversibility does not apply to the frozen assets but to the suspension of immunity, which can be reversed when Russia comes into compliance with its international obligations. Others have agreed. A Stanford Law Review article calls this "...too clever by half. The reversibility requirement cannot be circumvented so easily." It argues that since transferring the assets to Ukraine is not reversible the countermeasure does not serve to induce compliance, undercutting "the very raison d'être of countermeasures doctrine." Reversibility is a key requirement, the article insists, without which there is likely to be a "rapidly proliferating unlawfulness" bringing many undesirable consequences.

The RDI report claims that even if reversibility referred to the economic effects of the suspension rather than to the suspension itself, the transfer of frozen assets to Russia would still satisfy reversibility since Russia will be placed in the same economic condition it would have been in if no countermeasures had been applied. Let's assume that the frozen assets amount to €300 billion and that by invading Ukraine Russia became obligated under international law to pay reparations to Ukraine for the damage caused, amounting to €800 billion. (Note: United Nations Charter Article 2, paragraph 4 says, "All Members shall refrain in their international relations from the threat or use of force against the territorial integrity or political independence of any State, or in any other manner inconsistent with the Purposes of the United Nations." The UN General Assembly on 2 March 2022 adopted a resolution declaring Russia to be in violation of this provision of the UN Charter. ARSIWA Article 31(1) says, "The responsible State is under an obligation to make full reparation for the injury caused by the internationally wrongful act.") If there had been no freezing of assets, Russia's balance sheet (so to speak) would show a €300 billion asset and an €800 billion liability, with a net economic result of a €500 billion liability. On the other hand, if the frozen assets are transferred to Ukraine, Russia's liability to Ukraine would be reduced by that amount, resulting in the same net €500 billion liability on its balance sheet. Since Russia would thereby be placed in the same economic condition it would have occupied if no countermeasures had been applied this must be seen as consonant with the reversibility requirement, according to the RDI report and others. Looked at in a different way, freezing the €300 billion until Russia has complied with its reparation obligation to Ukraine has the same impact on Russia as transferring the €300 billion directly to Ukraine. According to this line of thinking, if there is a right to hold onto the €300 billion until Russia agrees to give it to Ukraine then it is absurd to say that the doctrine of reversibility is violated if it is transferred directly to Ukraine but it is not violated if the countermeasure is "reversed" and the money is transferred to Russia but under conditions that offset it against an amount that Russia would be required to pay Ukraine, as in one European Commission proposal.

The RDI report adds that countermeasures must be reversible "as far as possible", and that this is not an absolute and inflexible requirement. "Accordingly, even if transfer of Russia's sovereign assets did not fully comport with the reversibility principle, this would be a prime example in which the expectation of reversibility must yield to the more pressing need to pursue a countermeasure that would effectively induce Russia's compliance with international law." However, the Stanford Law Review article claims that the comments to the ARSIWA show that the term "as far as possible" "does not create a loophole" to justify irreversible measures, but requires a state having a choice as to which countermeasure to implement, to choose one that is reversible. Others add that while the ARSIWA may have some flexibility on reversibility, it has no flexibility on the requirement that countermeasures be temporary, and confiscation is not temporary.

==== Confiscation of income or interest on frozen assets ====
Those arguing that it is an illegitimate countermeasure to confiscate Russian assets and deliver them to Ukraine for purposes of reparations also argue that the same principle governs investing the frozen assets and turning over investment gains to Ukraine. On the other hand, some analysts claim that confiscating just the income or interest on the frozen funds would not violate the requirement that countermeasures be reversibile. A proposal announced 12 December 2023 by the European Commission to use the interest and profits from frozen Russian assets to benefit Ukraine was said to take the position that these revenues "do not constitute sovereign assets and do not have to be made available to the Central Bank of Russia under applicable rules", and therefore delivering them to Ukraine would not violate the reversibility requirement.
