= Distributed firewall =

Type of computer firewall

A distributed firewall is a security application on a host machine of a network that protects the servers and user machines of its enterprise's networks against unwanted intrusion. A firewall is a system or group of systems (router, proxy, or gateway) that implements a set of security rules to enforce access control between two networks to protect the "inside" network from the "outside" network. They filter all traffic regardless of its origin—the Internet or the internal network. Usually deployed behind the traditional firewall, they provide a second layer of defense. The advantages of the distributed firewall allow security rules (policies) to be defined and pushed out on an enterprise-wide basis, which is necessary for larger enterprises.

== Basic Working ==
Distributed firewalls are often kernel-mode applications that sit at the bottom of the OSI stack in the operating system. They filter all traffic regardless of its origin—the Internet or the internal network. They treat both the Internet and the internal network as "unfriendly". They guard the individual machine in the same way that the perimeter firewall guards the overall network. Distributed firewall function rests on three notions:

- A policy language that states what sort of connections are permitted or prohibited,
- Any of a number of system management tools, such as Microsoft's SMS or ASD, and
- IPSEC, the network-level encryption mechanism for Internet Protocol (TCP, UDP, etc.)

The basic idea is simple. A compiler translates the policy language into some internal format. The system management software distributes this policy file to all hosts that are protected by the firewall. And incoming packets are accepted or rejected by each "inside" host, according to both the policy and the cryptographically verified identity of each sender.

== Features ==
- A central management system for designing the policies,
- A transmission system to transmit these policies, and
- Implementation of the designed policies at the client end.

=== Central Management System ===
The security policy of distributed firewalls are defined centrally, and the enforcement of the policy takes place at each endpoint (hosts, routers, etc.) Centralized management is the ability to populate servers and end-users machines, to configure and "push out" consistent security policies, which helps to maximize limited resources. The ability to gather reports and maintain updates centrally makes distributed security practical. This feature of distributed firewalls helps in two ways. Firstly, remote end-user machines can be secured. Secondly, they secure critical servers on the network preventing intrusion by malicious code and "jailing" other such code by not letting the protected server be used as a launchpad for expanded attacks.

=== Policy Transmission System ===
The distribution of the policy, or security rules, can be different and varies with the implementation. It can be either directly pushed to end systems, or pulled when necessary.

==== Pull technique ====
In the pull technique, the hosts, while booting up, notify the central management server to check whether the central management server is up and active. It registers with the central management server and requests the policies it should implement. The central management server then provides the host with its security policies.

==== Push Technique ====
The push technique is used when the policies are updated on the central-management side by the network administrator, and the hosts have to be updated immediately. This push technology ensures that the hosts always have the updated policies at any time. The policy language defines which inbound and outbound connections on any component of the network policy domain are allowed, and can affect policy decisions on any layer of the network, whether they are rejecting or passing certain packets or enforcing policies at the Application Layer of the OSI stack.

=== Host-end Implementation ===
Conventional firewalls rely on controlling entry points to function, or more precisely, rely on the assumption that everyone on one side of the entry point—the firewall—is to be trusted, and that anyone on the other side is, at least potentially, an enemy. Distributed firewalls work by enabling only essential traffic into the machine they protect, prohibiting other types of traffic to prevent unwanted intrusions. The security policies transmitted from the central management server also have to be implemented by the host. The host-end part of the distributed firewall does not provide any administrative control for the network administrator to control the implementation of policies. The host allows traffic based on the security rules it has implemented.

=== End-to-end Encryption ===
End-to-end encryption is a threat to conventional firewalls, since the firewall generally does not have the necessary keys to peek through the encryption. Distributed firewalls use the implementation technique end-to-end IPSEC. IPSEC is a protocol suite, recently standardized by the IETF, which provides network-layer security services such as packet confidentiality, authentication, data integrity, replay protection, and automated key management. This is an artifact of firewall deployment: internal traffic that is not seen by the firewall cannot be filtered; as a result, internal users can mount attacks on other users and networks without the firewall being able to intervene. Large networks today tend to have a large number of entry points. Furthermore, many sites employ internal firewalls to provide some form of compartmentalization. This makes administration particularly difficult, both from a practical point of view and with regard to policy consistency, since no unified and comprehensive management mechanism exists. In end-to-end IPSEC, each incoming packet is associated with a certificate; the access granted to that packet is determined by the rights granted to that certificate. If the certificate name is different, or if there is no IPSEC protection, the packet will be dropped as unauthorized. Given that access rights in a strong distributed firewall are tied to certificates, access rights can be limited by changing the set of certificates accepted. Only hosts with newer certificates are then considered to be "inside"; if the change is not installed, the machine will have fewer privileges.

=== Network Topology ===
Distributed firewalls can protect hosts that are not within a topological boundary. System management packages are used to administer individual machines, so security administrators define security policy in terms of host identifiers and policy can be enforced by each individual host. Conventional firewall can only enforce a policy on traffic that traverses it, so traffic exchanged among nodes in the protected network cannot be controlled, which gives an attacker that is already an insider or can somehow bypass the firewall and establish a new, unauthorized entry point to the network without the administrator's knowledge and consent. For conventional firewalls, protocols such as RealAudio are difficult to process, because conventional firewalls lacks certain knowledge that is readily available at the endpoints. Due to the increasing line speeds and the more computation-intensive protocols that a firewall must support, traditional firewalls tend to become congestion points. This gap between processing and networking speeds is likely to increase, because as computers (and hence firewalls) are getting faster, the combination of more complex protocols and the tremendous increase in the amount of data that must be passed through the firewall has been and likely will continue to outpace Moore's law.

== Effectiveness ==
=== Service exposure and port scanning ===
Distributed firewalls are excellent at rejecting connection requests for inappropriate services. They typically drop such requests at the host, but alternatively, they may instead send back a response requesting that the connection be authenticated, which in turn gives notice of the existence of the host. Unlike conventional firewalls built on pure packet filters which cannot reject some "stealth scans" very well, distributed firewalls will reassemble packets from a port scanner and then reject it.

=== IP address spoofing ===
These attacks can be dealt with at the host by distributed firewalls with corresponding rules for discarding packets from inside the network policy domain. Distributed firewalls can use cryptographic mechanisms to prevent attacks based on forged source addresses, under the assumption that the trusted repository containing all necessary credentials has not been subject to compromise in itself.

=== Malicious software ===
The distributed firewall's framework and policy language, which allows for a policy decision on the application level, can circumvent a wide variety of threats residing in the application and intermediate level of communication traffic. In complex, resource-consuming situations where decisions must be made on code like Java, distributed firewalls can placate threats under the condition that contents of such communication packets can be interpreted semantically by the policy verifying mechanisms. Stateful inspection of packets shows up to be easily adapted to these requirements and allows for finer granularity in decision making. Policy enforcement of distributed firewalls is also not compromised when malicious code contents are completely disguised with the use of virtual private networks and enciphered communication traffic to the screening unit at the network perimeter, unlike conventional firewalls.

=== Intrusion detection ===
Distributed firewalls can detect attempted intrusions, but may have difficulty with probe collection. Each individual host in a network has to notice probes and forward them to some central location for processing and correlation. The former problem is not hard; many hosts already log such attempts. The collection is more problematic, especially at times of poor connectivity to the central site. There is also the risk of coordinated attacks in effect, causing a denial-of-service attack against the central machine.

=== Insider attacks ===
A distributed firewall's independence on topological constraints supports the enforcement of policies, whether hosts are members or outsiders of the overall policy domain. They base their decisions on authenticating mechanisms which are not inherent characteristics of the network's layout. Moreover, compromise of an endpoint either by a legitimate user or intruder will not weaken the overall network in a way that leads directly to compromise of other machines, given the fact that the deployment of virtual private networks prevents sniffing of communication traffic in which the attacked machine is not involved. But on the end-point itself, assuming that a machine has been taken over by an adversary must lead to the conclusion that the policy enforcement mechanisms themselves may be broken. The installation of backdoors on this machine can be done quite easily once the security mechanisms are flawed, and with the lack of a perimeter firewall, there is no trusted entity which might prevent arbitrary traffic entering or leaving the compromised host. Additionally, tools can be used that allow tunneling of another application's communication, and can not be prevented without proper knowledge of the decrypting credentials; moreover, given the fact that an attack has been performed successfully, the verifying mechanisms of the machine themselves may not be trusted anymore.

=== User Cooperation ===
At first glance, the biggest weakness of distributed firewalls is their greater susceptibility to lack of cooperation by users. Distributed firewalls can reduce the threat of actual attacks by insiders, simply by making it easier to set up smaller groups of users. Thus, one can restrict access to a file server to only those users who need it, rather than letting anyone inside the company have access. It is also worth expending some effort to prevent casual subversion of policies. Policies could be digitally signed, and verified by a frequently-changing key in an awkward-to-replace location. For more stringent protections, the policy enforcement can be incorporated into a tamper-resistant network card.
