= Radiant Mercury =

Software application by Lockheed Martin

Radiant Mercury is a cross-domain solution (CDS) software application developed by Lockheed Martin primarily in use by the US Navy.

As a CDS, it is designed to allow communications between higher-level classified networks and lower-level, unclassified networks.

== See also ==
- Guard (information security)
