= Afghan frozen assets =

Afghan bank assets frozen by the US government

Afghan frozen assets are assets that were frozen in the United States and around the world following the 2021 Fall of Kabul and the subsequent collapse of the Islamic Republic of Afghanistan against the Taliban. The Afghan frozen assets are the second-largest amount of financial money from a country that was seized by the US since the Iranian frozen assets from 1980.

== Background ==
Prior to the 2021 takeover of Afghanistan by the Taliban, Da Afghanistan Bank had approximately $7 billion of reserves on deposit at the Federal Reserve Bank of New York, in addition to $2 billion in Europe.

== History ==
After the fall of Kabul in August 2021, the Biden administration froze the funds in New York, because it was unclear who had the legal authority to access the account.

On 11 February 2022, President Joe Biden announced that he intended to move $3.5 billion from the account to a trust fund to support humanitarian assistance in Afghanistan, and reserve $3.5 billion for potential legal claims by families of the victims of the September 11 attacks.

On 26 August 2022, a judge recommended to not award damages as the bank is "immune from jurisdiction" and that doing so would "acknowledge" the Taliban as the legitimate Afghan government.

== Aftermath ==
The assets freeze led to economic collapse, high unemployment, and widespread hunger. According to Save the Children, 50% of the population of Afghanistan faces extreme hunger.

== Reactions ==
Daniel W. Drezner described the move as the US government "looting assets legally held by another sovereign government to reward its own citizens". Drezner also said the case could be used as precedent in the future for another sovereign government to take assets legally held by a sovereign government to reward its own citizens and that it gave other countries another reason to fear "weaponization" of the dollar.

== See also ==
- United States government sanctions
- Certain Iranian Assets
- Confiscation of Russian central bank funds
