= Internet Spyware Prevention Act =

Act by United States Congress to penalise spyware creators

The Internet Spyware Prevention Act, also known as I-SPY, is an act by the United States Congress to impose penalties and punishments on creators of computer spyware. The act was first introduced in the House of Representatives in 2004 (H.R. 744) and passed the house in 2005. The bill was reintroduced in March 2007 to further prosecute makers of spyware.

== History ==
On June 23, 2004, Representatives Bob Goodlatte, Zoe Lofgren, and Lamar S. Smith introduced the Internet Spyware Prevention Act as an amendment to Title 18 of the United States Code.

== Criticisms ==
Members of the Interactive Advertising Bureau claim that the provisions of the act would prohibit all but one form of data collection on computers, cookies. They say that advanced programs (involving JavaScript) in the future that utilize data collection would be criminalized under this act.

== See also ==
- Spyware
- United States Congress
