= Screening router =

A screening router performs packet-filtering and is used as a firewall. In some cases a screening router may be used as perimeter protection for the internal network or as the entire firewall solution.

== See also ==
- Access Control List
- DMZ
