= Renew Democracy Initiative =

US international nonprofit organization

Renew Democracy Initiative (RDI)
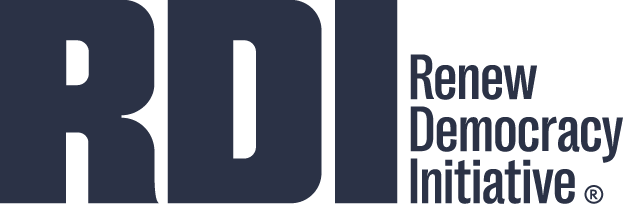
- Formation: 2017
- Type: 501(c)(3) non-profit
- Chairman: Garry Kasparov
- Vice-Chair: Linda Chavez
- CEO: Uriel Epshtein
- Website: rdi.org

The Renew Democracy Initiative (RDI) is a non-partisan, non-profit group, whose mission is to "unmask and confront the alliance of dictators threatening freedom around the world and inspiring people in the US and in other free countries to value and defend their own democracies". Describing itself as an "advocacy organization", RDI’s activities include publishing educational video content and written commentary, advocacy with policymakers, and direct humanitarian aid.

RDI was founded in 2017 by former World Chess Champion and Russian dissident Garry Kasparov. Espousing a cross-partisan political perspective, the organization's leadership consists of public figures from a variety of ideological backgrounds, including, among others, Kasparov, Linda Chavez, General Ben Hodges, Lieutenant Colonel Alexander Vindman, General Stanley McChrystal, Anne Applebaum, Bret Stephens, and Bill Kristol.

== History ==
Garry Kasparov founded RDI in 2017 in the months following the 2016 United States presidential election, bringing together over 120 center-left and center-right celebrities, politicians, and public intellectuals around a statement of common values. Over 120 prominent thinkers and leaders signed RDI's Values Statement outlining the principles the organization believed undergirded American democracy, including Dambisa Moyo, Scott Turow, Larry David, Stephen Fry, José María Aznar, Norman Foster, Natan Sharansky, Mario Vargas Llosa, Bret Stephens, and Bill Kristol.

In October 2018, RDI released its inaugural publication, Fight for Liberty. Taking inspiration from The Federalist Papers, the book features a collection of essays by contributors allied with RDI's mission and values. Kirkus Reviews wrote that "The strongest point of this useful collection is the depth and breadth of its opposition to our current illiberal atmosphere... A valuable addition to the literature of democratic resistance".

In 2021, RDI launched its Frontlines of Freedom (FOF) program in partnership with CNN under the banner of the "Voices of Freedom" limited series, which highlighted the stories of pro-democracy dissidents. Currently, FOF has grown to include over 100 dissidents from roughly 40 different countries and many different ideologies who all value the core principles of freedom. This program leverages dissident voices to speak with students, public officials, business leaders, and the broader public about the dangers posed by a network of authoritarian leaders, the importance of American leadership, and how to combat the threats facing democracy in countries around the world. Johns Hopkins University, which partners with RDI on Frontlines of Freedom, described the work of member dissidents as "sounding a warning cry to Americans on the fragility of their own democratic pillars".

Material and political support for Ukraine became a central component of RDI's work following the 2022 Russian invasion. The organization reports that it has delivered over $12 million in humanitarian aid to frontline regions between February 2022 and early 2024. Following the 2023 Hamas-led attack on Israel, RDI also began to focus on "misinformation, disinformation, and propaganda hanging over America in the aftermath of October 7."

== Projects ==
=== Frontlines of Freedom and Campus Activity ===
In the fall of 2021, RDI partnered with CNN to create Voices of Freedom, a limited series featuring foreign political dissidents' perspective on American democracy. RDI's founder and Chairman, Garry Kasparov's personal story of transitioning from world chess champion to Russian political figure to American democracy activist is just one example. Voices of Freedom served as the foundation for the Frontlines of Freedom (FOF) program, the purpose of which RDI describes as sharing the stories of political dissidents in order to "remind those of us living in the Free World how inspirational our democracies truly are and how important they are to defend".

Frontlines of Freedom has grown to encompass numerous projects including an intersession course taught annually at Johns Hopkins University since 2022.

In November of 2023, RDI hosted its first annual Frontlines of Freedom Conference to address transnational repression. The event was hosted in partnership with Freedom House, Johns Hopkins University, the American Enterprise Institute, the Foundation for Individual Rights and Expression, PEN America, and the George W. Bush Presidential Center, among others. According to the organization, the conference "united over 100 pro-democracy dissidents, NGO leaders, political decision-makers, business leaders, and journalists to address the cross-border targeting of activists in exile by the governments they fled." As part of the programming, attendees received trainings and participated in panel discussions.

=== Video content and media ===
RDI has published a range of video content, including geopolitically-oriented conversations with retired military officials like Ben Hodges and Stanley McChrystal, satirical content targeting individuals like Scott Ritter, Jackson Hinkle, and Tulsi Gabbard, and "man on the street"-style interviews.

=== Ukraine humanitarian aid and advocacy ===
In 2023, RDI commissioned a report produced by constitutional law expert Laurence Tribe and the law firm Kaplan, Hecker & Fink, regarding the seizure and transfer of frozen Russian Central Bank assets to Ukraine. Entitled Making Putin Pay the report determined that "the United States and its allies have the necessary legal authority and a moral obligation to punish Russia for its brutality and illegal actions by transferring Russian sovereign assets to Ukraine." The report was cited in The Washington Post, The New York Times, The Atlantic, and in testimony to the U.S. Congress. Following the publication of Making Putin Pay, RDI also advocated for passage of the REPO for Ukrainians Act, which affirmed the president's authority to transfer frozen Russian assets to Ukraine. Following the Senate Foreign Relations Committee's passage of the REPO Act, Senators Jim Risch and Sheldon Whitehouse quoted RDI Chairman Garry Kasparov in a statement as saying: "RDI maintains that President Biden has the undisputed authority to transfer Russian assets held in the United States—as clearly explained in an independent study, 'Making Putin Pay.'"

In fall 2023, RDI organized a delegation of British Conservatives to the United States led by former British Prime Minister Liz Truss to educate Republicans in Congress about the importance of defending Ukraine from a conservative point of view.

In the summer of 2024, RDI launched the German Responsibility Campaign, aimed at pressuring the German government to provide additional military aid to Ukraine, including the Taurus cruise missile. The campaign featured a petition and personal video appeal from Garry Kasparov to Chancellor Olaf Scholz, a full-page advertisement in Bild, and an op-ed by Kasparov in Die Welt.

== Leadership and people ==
Uriel Epshtein is RDI's CEO. Garry Kasparov serves as its chairman and Linda Chavez as its vice-chair. Additionally, RDI's Board of Directors include Igor Kirman, Ben Hodges, and Alexander Vindman. RDI's advisory board includes Anne Applebaum, Bill Kristol, Bret Stephens, Dan Benton, Katherine Chapin, Daniel Hurwitz, Eric Wolf, Karl-Theodor zu Guttenberg, Lisa Berg, Lucy Caldwell, Max Boot, Mark Lasswell, Rachel Vindman, Rina Shah, General Stanley McChrystal, and Whitney Haring-Smith.

== See also ==
- Bipartisanship in United States politics
- Nonpartisanship
- Idealism in international relations
