= Erga omnes =

Latin term used for legal purposes

In legal terminology, erga omnes rights or obligations are owed toward all. Erga omnes is a Latin phrase which means "towards all" or "towards everyone". For instance, a property right is an erga omnes entitlement and therefore enforceable against anybody infringing that right.

An erga omnes right can be distinguished from a right based on contract, which is unenforceable except against the contracting party.

Its first recorded use dates back to a 1956 article written by the Belgian lawyer Henri Rolin. It then became famous when it was used by the International Court of Justice in 1970, in the Barcelona Traction case.

== International law ==
In international law, it has been used as a legal term describing obligations owed by states towards the community of states as a whole. An erga omnes obligation exists because of the universal and undeniable interest in the perpetuation of critical rights and the prevention of their breach. Consequently, any state has the right to invoke state responsibility in order to hold the responsible state legally liable and required to pay reparations. Erga omnes obligations attach when there is a serious breach of peremptory norms of international law like those against piracy, genocide and wars of aggression. The concept was recognized in the International Court of Justice's decision in the Barcelona Traction case [(Belgium v Spain) (Second Phase) ICJ Rep 1970 3 at paragraph 33]:

... an essential distinction should be drawn between the obligations of a State towards the international community as a whole, and those arising vis-à-vis another State in the field of diplomatic protection. By their very nature, the former are the concern of all States. In view of the importance of the rights involved, all States can be held to have a legal interest in their protection; they are obligations erga omnes. [at 34] Such obligations derive, for example, in contemporary international law, from the outlawing of acts of aggression, and of genocide, as also from the principles and rules concerning the basic rights of the human person, including protection from slavery and racial discrimination. Some of the corresponding rights of protection have entered into the body of general international law ... others are conferred by international instruments of a universal or quasi-universal character.

A right or obligation erga omnes partes is owed toward all other parties to a treaty.

== Examples ==
- In its advisory opinion of 9 July 2004, the International Court of Justice found "the right of peoples to self-determination" to be a right erga omnes. The finding referred to article 22 of the Covenant of the League of Nations.
- In its judgment of 20 July 2012 between Belgium and Senegal, the International Court of Justice found that in relation to the Convention against Torture, "any State party to the Convention may invoke the responsibility of another State party with a view to ascertaining the alleged failure to comply with its obligations erga omnes partes".
- In its order on provisional measures of 23 January 2020, the International Court of Justice found that The Gambia had prima facie standing in the Rohingya genocide case that it had brought against Myanmar on the basis of the Genocide Convention.
- In its advisory opinion of 19 July 2024 on "Legal Consequences arising from the Policies and Practices of Israel in the Occupied Palestinian Territory, including East Jerusalem", the International Court of Justice found that in view of Israel's violations of certain obligations erga omnes, among them the obligation to respect the right of the Palestinian people to self-determination, all States and international organizations are "under an obligation not to recognize as legal the situation arising from the unlawful presence of Israel in the Occupied Palestinian Territory. They are also under an obligation not to render aid or assistance in maintaining the situation created by Israel’s illegal presence in the Occupied Palestinian Territory."
- In the ICJs advisiory opinion "OBLIGATIONS OF STATES IN RESPECT OF CLIMATE CHANGE" of 25 July 2025 the Court observed that certain rules of international law relating to global common goods, such as the climate system, may produce erga omnes obligations. In particular it views the duty to prevent significant transboundary harm under customary international law as an erga omnes obligation.

== International Law Commission ==
The UN International Law Commission has codified the erga omnes principle in its draft articles on state responsibility. They allow all states to invoke a state responsibility that another state incurred because of its unlawful actions if "the obligation breached is owed to the international community as a whole". The ILC refers directly in its comments to the article to the erga omnes principle and to the ICJ's acceptance of it in the Barcelona Traction case.

== See also ==
- Inter partes
- Jus cogens (peremptory norm)
