= State responsibility =

Responsibility of government in international law

The laws of state responsibility are the principles governing when and how a state is held responsible for a breach of an international obligation. Rather than set forth any particular obligations, the rules of state responsibility determine, in general, when an obligation has been breached and the legal consequences of that violation. In this way they are "secondary" rules that address basic issues of responsibility and remedies available for breach of "primary" or substantive rules of international law, such as with respect to the use of armed force. Because of this generality, the rules can be studied independently of the primary rules of obligation. They establish (1) the conditions of actions to qualify as internationally wrongful, (2) the circumstances under which actions of officials, private individuals and other entities may be attributed to the state, (3) general defences to liability and (4) the consequences of liability.

The theory of the law of state responsibility was not well developed before the adoption of the Draft Articles on Responsibility of States for Internationally Wrongful Acts ("Draft Articles") by the International Law Commission (ILC) in August 2001. The Draft Articles are a combination of codification and progressive development. They have already been cited by the International Court of Justice and "are considered by courts and commentators to be in whole or in large part an accurate codification of the customary international law of state responsibility".

Although the articles are general in coverage, they do not necessarily apply in all cases. Particular treaty regimes, such as the General Agreement on Tariffs and Trade and the European Convention on Human Rights, have established their own special rules of responsibility.

== History ==
Traditionally, the term "state responsibility" referred only to state responsibility for injuries to aliens. It included not only "secondary" issues such as attribution and remedies, but also the primary rights and duties of states, for example the asserted international standard of treatment and the right of diplomatic protection. Early efforts by the League of Nations and private bodies to codify the rules of "state responsibility" reflected the traditional focus on responsibility for injuries to aliens. The League's 1930 Codification Conference in The Hague was able to reach an agreement only on "secondary" issues such as imputation, not on substantive rules regarding the treatment of aliens and their property.

Attempts to codify and develop the rules of state responsibility have continued throughout the life of the United Nations. It took nearly 45 years, more than thirty reports, and extensive work by five Special Rapporteurs in order for the International Law Commission to reach agreement on the final text of the Draft Articles as a whole, with commentaries. At the same time, the customary international law of state responsibility concerning matters such as detention and physical ill-treatment of aliens and their right to a fair trial has been rendered less important than formerly by the development of international human rights law, which applies to all individuals, whether aliens or nationals. The concept of a general regime of legal responsibility, which the rules of state responsibility have taken on, is an inception of the civil law system and is largely foreign to the common law tradition.

=== Codification ===
The topic of state responsibility was one of the first 14 areas provisionally selected for the ILC's attention in 1949. When the ILC listed the topic for codification in 1953, "state responsibility" was distinguished from a separate topic on the "treatment of aliens", reflecting the growing view that state responsibility encompasses the breach of an international obligation.

The ILC's first special rapporteur on state responsibility, F.V. García Amador of Cuba, appointed in 1955 noted, "It would be difficult to find a topic beset with greater confusion and uncertainty." García Amador attempted to return to the traditional focus on responsibility for injury to aliens but his work was essentially abandoned by the ILC when his membership ended in 1961. His successor, Roberto Ago of Italy, reconceptualised the ILC's work in terms of the distinction between primary and secondary rules, and also established the basic organisational structure of what would become the Draft Articles. By focusing on general rules, stated at a high level of abstraction, Ago created a politically safe space within which the ILC could work and largely avoid the contentious debates of the day. From 1969 until his election to the ICJ in 1980, Ago completed work on part 1 of the draft articles, addressing the origin of state responsibility. Most of the thirty-five articles adopted during his tenure are reflected in the final draft.

Work on the remainder of the articles proceeded slowly throughout the 1980s and early 1990s. Willem Riphagen of the Netherlands, who served as special rapporteur to 1986, stressed that particular primary rules may specify the consequences of their breach - an idea conveyed by the articles through the recognition of lex specialis. Gaetano Arangio-Ruiz, special rapporteur from 1988, helped clarify the consequences of breaches of international obligations. Over the next eight years, the ILC completed its first reading of parts 2 and 3.

In 1995, the United Nations General Assembly adopted a resolution in effect pressing the Commission to make progress on the state responsibility articles and other long-pending projects. James Crawford of Australia, appointed as special rapporteur in 1996, approached the task pragmatically. The ILC moved rapidly through a second reading of the draft articles, adopting what it could agree on and jettisoning the rest, most notable of which was Article 19 on state crimes and the section on dispute settlement.

== Draft Articles ==
The final text of the Draft Articles was adopted by the ILC in August 2001, bringing to completion one of the Commission's longest running and most controversial studies. On 12 December 2001, the United Nations General Assembly adopted resolution 56/83, which "commended [the articles] to the attention of Governments without prejudice to the question of their future adoption or other appropriate action."

Crawford notes that the rules are "rigorously general in character," encompassing all types of international obligations.

=== Internationally wrongful acts ===
According to the Draft Articles, an internationally wrongful act must:

- be attributable to the state under international law; and
- constitute a breach of an international obligation of the state.

=== International crimes ===
Earlier drafts of the Articles on State Responsibility contained Article 19, which provided for "state crimes". Article 19 included the following provisions:

2. An internationally wrongful act which results from the breach by a State of an international obligation so essential for the protection of fundamental interests of the international community that its breach is recognized as a crime by that community as a whole constitutes an international crime.

3. Subject to Paragraph 2, and on the basis of the rules of international law in force, an international crime may result, inter alia, from:

(a) a serious breach of an international obligation of essential importance for the maintenance of international peace and security, such as that prohibiting aggression;

(b) a serious breach of an international obligation of essential importance for safeguarding the right of self-determination of peoples, such as that prohibiting the establishment or maintenance by force of colonial domination;

(c) a serious breach on a widespread scale of an international obligation of essential importance for safeguarding the human being, such as those prohibiting slavery, genocide and apartheid;

(d) a serious breach of an international obligation of essential importance for the safeguarding and preservation of the human environment, such as those prohibiting massive pollution of the atmosphere or of the seas.

4. Any internationally wrongful act which is not an international crime in accordance with paragraph 2 constitutes an international delict.

Article 19 was deleted from the final Draft Articles.

=== Attribution ===
Before a state can be held responsible for any action, it is necessary to prove a causal connection between the injury and an official act or omission attributable to the state alleged to be in breach of its obligations. This has become an increasingly significant contemporary issue, as non-state actors such as Al Qaeda, multinational corporations, and non-governmental organisations play greater international roles, and as governments privatise some traditional functions.

The state is responsible for all actions of its officials and organs, even if the organ or official is formally independent and even if the organ or official is acting ultra vires. Persons or entities not classified as organs of the State may still be imputable, when they are otherwise empowered to exercise elements of governmental authority, and act in that capacity in the particular instance. Persons or entities not performing public functions may equally be imputable, if they in fact acted under the direction or control of the State. Where there is a breakdown of normal governmental authority and control, such as in so-called "failed states", the actions of those acting as the "government" in a de facto sense will be acts of the state. The acts of an "insurrectional or other movement that becomes the new government of an existing state or succeeds in establishing a new state" can also be attributed to the state. This is also the case where a state acknowledges and adopts the conduct of private persons as its own.

Despite their apparent concreteness, the standards stated in some rules involve important ambiguities, and their application will often require significant fact-finding and judgment. Most rules state responsibility involving private acts already arise under primary rules. For example, environmental and human rights agreements require states to prevent abuses by private parties.

=== Defences ===
If the general elements to establish state responsibility are established, the question arises as to whether any defences may be available to the respondent state.

These include force majeure (Article 23), distress (Article 24), necessity (Article 25) and counter measures (Articles 49-52), self-defence (article 21) and consent (article 20).

=== Consequences of breach ===
The breach of an international obligation entails two types of legal consequences. Firstly, it creates new obligations for the breaching state, principally, duties of cessation and non-repetition (Article 30), and a duty to make full reparation (Article 31). Article 33(1) characterises these secondary obligations as being owed to other states or to the international community as a whole. Articles indirectly acknowledges in a savings clause also that states may owe secondary obligations to non-state actors such as individuals or international organisations.

Second, the articles create new rights for injured states, principally, the right to invoke responsibility (Articles 42 and 48) and a limited right to take countermeasures (Articles 49-53). These rights, however, are heavily state-centred and do not deal with how state responsibility is to be implemented if the holder of the right is an individual or an organisation. The principal element of progressive development in this area is Article 48, which provides that certain violations of international obligations can affect the international community as a whole such that state responsibility can be invoked by states on behalf of the larger community. This provision picks up on the ICJ's celebrated suggestion in Barcelona Traction that some obligations are owed erga omnes, toward the international community as a whole.

=== Reparation ===
If illegal actions are continuing, the state has a duty to cease. The state also has duties to make reparation, which could involve restitution, compensation, or satisfaction. Remedies will be dependent on the particular forum, such as the United Nations, International Court of Justice, World Trade Organization, International Tribunal for the Law of the Sea, International Criminal Court, and on the purpose of reparation.

== See also ==
- Nuremberg Principles
- Rule according to higher law
- Sovereign state
- Collective responsibility
