= DMZ (computing) =

Subnetwork of a system exposed to external world

In computer security, a DMZ or demilitarized zone (sometimes referred to as a perimeter network or screened subnet) is a physical or logical subnetwork that contains and exposes an organization's external-facing services to an untrusted, usually larger, network such as the Internet. The purpose of a DMZ is to add an additional layer of security to an organization's local area network (LAN): an external network node can access only what is exposed in the DMZ, while the rest of the organization's network is protected behind a firewall. The DMZ functions as a small, isolated network positioned between the Internet and the private network.

This is not to be confused with a DMZ host, a feature present in some home routers that frequently differs greatly from an ordinary DMZ.

The name is from the term demilitarized zone, an area between states in which military operations are not permitted.

== Rationale ==
The DMZ is seen as not belonging to either network bordering it. This metaphor applies to the computing use as the DMZ acts as a gateway to the public Internet. It is neither as secure as the internal network nor as insecure as the public internet.

In this case, the hosts most vulnerable to attack are those that provide services to users outside of the local area network, such as e-mail, Web and Domain Name System (DNS) servers. Because of the increased potential of these hosts suffering an attack, they are placed into this specific subnetwork in order to protect the rest of the network in case any of them become compromised.

Hosts in the DMZ are permitted to have only limited connectivity to specific hosts in the internal network, as the content of DMZ is not as secure as the internal network. Similarly, communication between hosts in the DMZ and to the external network is also restricted to make the DMZ more secure than the Internet and suitable for housing these special-purpose services. This allows hosts in the DMZ to communicate with both the internal and external network, while an intervening firewall controls the traffic between the DMZ servers and the internal network clients, and another firewall would perform some level of control to protect the DMZ from the external network.

A DMZ configuration provides additional security from external attacks, but it typically has no bearing on internal attacks such as sniffing communication via a packet analyzer or spoofing, such as e-mail spoofing.

It is also sometimes good practice to configure a separate classified militarized zone (CMZ), a highly monitored militarized zone comprising mostly Web servers (and similar servers that interface to the external world i.e. the Internet) that are not in the DMZ but contain sensitive information about accessing servers within the LAN (like database servers). In such architecture, the DMZ usually has the application firewall and the FTP while the CMZ hosts the Web servers. (The database servers could be in the CMZ, in the LAN, or in a separate VLAN altogether.)

Any service that is being provided to users on the external network can be placed in the DMZ. The most common of these services are:

- Web servers
- Mail servers
- FTP servers
- VoIP servers

Web servers that communicate with an internal database require access to a database server, which may not be publicly accessible and may contain sensitive information. The web servers can communicate with database servers either directly or through an application firewall for security reasons.

E-mail messages and particularly the user database are confidential, so they are typically stored on servers that cannot be accessed from the Internet (at least not in an insecure manner), but can be accessed from email servers that are exposed to the Internet.

The mail server inside the DMZ passes incoming mail to the secured/internal mail servers. It also handles outgoing mail.

For security, compliance with legal standards such as HIPAA, and monitoring reasons, in a business environment, some enterprises install a proxy server within the DMZ. This has the following benefits:

- Obliges internal users (usually employees) to use the proxy server for Internet access.
- Reduced Internet access bandwidth requirements since some web content may be cached by the proxy server.
- Simplifies recording and monitoring of user activities.
- Centralized web content filtering.

A reverse proxy server, like a proxy server, is an intermediary but is used the other way around. Instead of providing a service to internal users wanting to access an external network, it provides indirect access for an external network (usually the Internet) to internal resources. For example, a back office application access, such as an email system, could be provided to external users (to read emails while outside the company) but the remote user would not have direct access to their email server (only the reverse proxy server can physically access the internal email server). This is an extra layer of security particularly recommended when internal resources need to be accessed from the outside, but it's worth noting this design still allows remote (and potentially malicious) users to talk to the internal resources with the help of the proxy. Since the proxy functions as a relay between the non-trusted network and the internal resource: it may also forward malicious traffic (e.g. application level exploits) towards the internal network; therefore the proxy's attack detection and filtering capabilities are crucial in preventing external attackers from exploiting vulnerabilities present in the internal resources that are exposed via the proxy. Usually such a reverse proxy mechanism is provided by using an application layer firewall that focuses on the specific shape and contents of the traffic rather than just controlling access to specific TCP and UDP ports (as a packet filter firewall would do), but a reverse proxy is usually not a good substitute for a well thought out DMZ design as it has to rely on continuous signature updates for updated attack vectors.

== Architecture ==
There are many different ways to design a network with a DMZ. Two of the most basic methods are with a single firewall, also known as the three-legged model, and with dual firewalls, also known as back to back. These architectures can be expanded to create very complex architectures depending on the network requirements.

=== Single firewall ===
Diagram of a typical three-legged network model employing a DMZ using a single firewall.

A single firewall with at least 3 network interfaces can be used to create a network architecture containing a DMZ. The external network is formed from the Internet service provider to the firewall on the first network interface, the internal network is formed from the second network interface, and the DMZ is formed from the third network interface. The firewall becomes a single point of failure for the network and must be able to handle all of the traffic going to the DMZ as well as the internal network. The zones are usually marked with colors -for example, purple for LAN, green for DMZ, red for Internet (with often another color used for wireless zones).

=== Dual firewall ===
Diagram of a typical network employing DMZ using dual firewalls.

The most secure approach, according to Colton Fralick, is to use two firewalls to create a DMZ. The first firewall (also called the "front-end" or "perimeter" firewall) must be configured to allow traffic destined to the DMZ only. The second firewall (also called "back-end" or "internal" firewall) only allows traffic to the DMZ from the internal network.

This setup is considered more secure since two devices would need to be compromised. There is even more protection if the two firewalls are provided by two different vendors, because it makes it less likely that both devices suffer from the same security vulnerabilities. For example, a security hole found to exist in one vendor's system is less likely to occur in the other one. One of the drawbacks of this architecture is that it's more costly, both to purchase and to manage. The practice of using different firewalls from different vendors is sometimes described as a component of a "defense in depth" security strategy.

== DMZ host ==
Some routers have a feature called DMZ host. This feature could designate one node (PC or other device with an IP address) as a DMZ host. The router's firewall exposes all ports on the DMZ host to the external network and hinders no inbound traffic from the outside going to the DMZ host. This is a less secure alternative to port forwarding, which only exposes a handful of ports. This feature must be avoided, except when:

- The node designated as DMZ host is the downstream firewall of the actual DMZ (perhaps the router itself isn't part of a home network)
- The node runs a powerful firewall capable of regulating internal security
- The sheer number of ports is too great for the port-forwarding feature
- Correct port forwarding rules could not be formulated in advance
- The router's port forwarding is not capable of handling relevant traffic, e.g., 6in4 or GRE tunnels

In all but the first scenario above, the DMZ host feature is used outside a true DMZ configuration.

== See also ==
- Bastion host
- Screened subnet
- Science DMZ Network Architecture, a DMZ network in high-performance computing
