= Gelman v. Uruguay =

Gelman v Uruguay
- Court: Inter-American Court of Human Rights
- Full case name: Gelman v Uruguay
- Decided: February 24, 2011

Court membership
- Judges sitting: Diego García-Sayán, President; Leonardo A. Franco, Vice-President; Manuel E. Ventura Robles, Judge; Margarette May Macaulay, Judge; Rhadys Abreu Blondet, Judge; Eduardo Vio Grossi, Judge

Gelman v. Uruguay was a landmark international human rights law case decided by the Inter-American Court of Human Rights in 2011. The case concerned the enforced disappearance of María Claudia García Iruretagoyena de Gelman and Marcelo Ariel Gelman Schuberoff, and the subsequent abduction and identity suppression of their daughter, María Macarena Gelman García. These events took place during Uruguay's civic-military dictatorship between 1973 and 1985 in the context of Operation Condor, a United States-backed campaign of political repression in several South American regimes. The Court found that Uruguay was responsible for grave human rights violations, including forced disappearances and violations related to identity and family rights. It also ruled that Uruguay's 1986 Expiry Law, which granted amnesty for certain human rights violations, was incompatible with the American Convention on Human Rights and was legally ineffective in preventing the investigation and prosecution of those violations.

== Background ==
=== Political background ===
The enforced disappearances of Marcelo and María Claudia Gelman took place during the 1973–1985 civic-military dictatorship of Uruguay. Widespread human rights violations, including illegal detentions, torture, killings, and enforced disappearances of political opponents were carried out, often under the framework of Operation Condor, a clandestine, coordinated effort between the intelligence services and security forces of several South American dictatorships. The aim of this operation was to suppress perceived subversive elements across borders. This included exchanging intelligence and conducting joint operations, including the illegal transfer and elimination of political refugees and dissidents.

Uruguay's transition to democracy in 1985 was followed by the enactment of the 1986 Expiry Law, which effectively granted amnesty to military and police officials for crimes committed during the dictatorship. The executive was able to determine whether cases fell under the law. In referendums in 1989 and 2009, the Uruguayan people voted against overturning the Expiry Law.

=== Facts ===
In August 1976, María Claudia Gelman, a 19-year-old Argentine citizen who was seven months pregnant, was detained along with her husband, Marcelo Ariel Gelman (the son of Argentine poet Juan Gelman), in Buenos Aires, Argentina. The detention was carried out by a joint Argentine-Uruguayan military commando unit. The couple was then taken to Automotores Orletti, a clandestine detention and torture centre in Buenos Aires operated under Operation Condor. Marcelo was tortured and later killed; his remains were found in 1989. María Claudia was secretly transferred by Uruguayan authorities to Montevideo, Uruguay, in early October 1976.

María Claudia was held at the headquarters of Uruguay's Defense Information Service (SID). In late October or early November 1976, she gave birth to a daughter at a military hospital. Mother and daughter were returned to the SID headquarters and later moved to another clandestine centre. At the end of December 1976, the newborn baby was taken from her mother. María Claudia was subsequently disappeared; her fate and whereabouts remain unknown.

In January 1977, the baby was left on the doorstep of the family of a Uruguayan police officer, Ángel Tauriño. The Tauriño family raised the child as their own, naming her María Macarena Tauriño Vivian. She remained unaware of her true identity for over 23 years. Juan Gelman, Macarena's paternal grandfather, undertook a decades-long search for his son, daughter-in-law, and granddaughter. By investigating and interviewing former detainees and officials, he gathered information about María Claudia's fate and the existence of his granddaughter. In 2000, Juan located Macarena, and DNA testing confirmed her identity with 99.9% accuracy.

Juan Gelman's attempts to seek justice in Uruguay were initially blocked by the application of the Expiry Law. In June 2002, Juan filed a criminal complaint about the disappearance of María Claudia and the abduction and identity suppression of her daughter. In October 2003, the Court of Second Round decided that it must refer the case to the executive for an opinion on whether the Expiry Law applied. The government under President Jorge Batlle decided that the case fell within the scope of the Expiry Law, so the judge ordered the closure of the investigation in December 2003. Juan could not appeal due to legal limitations on victim participation. In November 2004, the Supreme Court of Uruguay rejected a challenge filed by Juan to the constitutionality of the Expiry Law. In June 2005, Juan sought to reopen the investigation, presenting new evidence. President Tabaré Vázquez's government excluded the Gelman case from the Expiry Law, allowing investigations to reopen. The prosecutor requested that the case be closed, as it had already been decided. The judge rejected this request, but was overturned on appeal. In 2005, a Uruguayan court nullified Macarena's original birth certificate and issued a new one recognising her as the daughter of Marcelo and María Claudia Gelman.

In 2008, Macarena Gelman requested that the case be reopened, arguing that there were new supervening facts, including military reports and confessions. The prosecutor agreed with reopening the investigation, and the judge ordered the case reopened. While the case was under pre-trial investigation, Macarena brought a complaint before the Inter-American Court of Human Rights.

== Decision ==
The Court unanimously declared that Uruguay was responsible for a number of human rights violations against María Claudia, Macarena, and Juan Gelman. It found the state responsible for the enforced disappearance of María Claudia. The Court also determined that the suppression and substitution of Macarena's identity from birth until its discovery constituted a form of enforced disappearance during that time period. Furthermore, it held the state responsible for violations of Juan Gelman's rights to humane treatment, personal integrity, and the protection of his family.

The Court based its decision on the obligation under Article 2 of the American Convention on Human Rights, which requires states to adopt legislative or other measures necessary to give effect to the rights and freedoms recognised in the Convention. In the Gelman case, this failure stemmed directly from the existence and application of the Expiry Law. The Court determined that this law, by impeding the investigation and punishment of those responsible for the grave human rights violations against María Claudia and Macarena Gelman, was incompatible with Uruguay's obligations under the Convention. Because the Expiry Law prevented the effective exercise of Convention rights, Uruguay had an obligation under Article 2 to ensure that its domestic legal framework did not maintain such obstacles. The decision stated:

244. The Inter-American Court concludes that the State violated the rights to fair trial [judicial guarantees] and judicial protection provided for in Articles 8(1) and 25(1) of the American Convention, in relation to Articles 1(1) and 2 thereof, and of the mentioned norms of the Inter-American Convention on Forced Disappearance of Persons, for failing to effectively investigate the disappearance María Claudia García Iruretagoyena, and the abduction, suppression of identity, and delivery of María Macarena Gelman to a third party, to the detriment of Juan and Maria Macarena Gelman.
245. ...
246. Due to the interpretation and application that has been given to the Expiry Law, which lacks legal effect in regard to human rights violations in the terms indicated above (supra para. 232), the State has not fulfilled its obligation to adapt its domestic legislation to the Convention, contained in Article 2 thereof, in relation to Articles 8(1), 25, and 1(1) thereof and Articles I(b), III, IV, and V of the Inter-American Convention on Forced Disappearance of Persons.

In the Gelman decision, the Court thereby declared that the Expiry Law lacked legal effect due to its incompatibility with the Convention. This was significant, because it represented an expansion of the doctrine of conventionality control, which had previously been thought only to apply to domestic judiciaries. After Gelman, the court required that the executive and legislature join the judiciary in ensuring that domestic legal provisions do not violate the terms of the Convention, essentially precluding the adoption or maintenance of any laws which violated the Convention. The decision also strongly reaffirmed that amnesty laws covering grave human rights violations are incompatible with the Convention.

== Reactions ==
=== Domestic reactions ===
President José Mujica publicly acknowledged the state's responsibility for the crimes committed during the dictatorship in a formal ceremony in Parliament in March 2012 which specifically referenced the Gelman case. The event, attended by Macarena and Juan Gelman, was a direct result of the Court's order for reparations.

In October 2011, the General Assembly of Uruguay passed a law which sought to nullify the Expiry Law and re-establish the state's ability to prosecute dictatorship-era crimes. However, the Supreme Court of Uruguay ruled that parts of the new law were unconstitutional, arguing that crimes against humanity were not codified in Uruguayan law during the dictatorship period and thus statutes of limitations could apply to many offences.

=== Scholarly reactions ===
The ruling in this case is considered to be significant in the development of the doctrine of conventionality control, confirming the power of the Court's interpretation of the Convention to override domestic law. A major point of debate among legal scholars was the decision to invalidate the effects of the Expiry Law despite it having been enacted democratically and twice upheld in popular referendums. Critics argued that the Court showed insufficient deference to Uruguay's democratic processes.
