= Amnesty =

Form of pardon

Amnesty (from Ancient Greek ἀμνηστία (amnēstía) 'forgetfulness, passing over') is defined as "A pardon extended by a government to a group or class of people, usually for a political offense; the act of a sovereign power officially forgiving certain classes of people who are subject to trial but have not yet been convicted." Though the term "general pardon" has a similar definition, an amnesty constitutes more than a pardon, in so much as it obliterates all legal remembrance of the offense. An amnesty law is any law that retroactively exempts a select group of people, usually military and government leaders, from criminal liability for crimes committed.

== Support ==
An amnesty may be extended when the authority decides that bringing citizens into compliance with a law is more important than punishing them for past offenses. Amnesty after a war helps end a conflict. While laws against treason, sedition, etc. are retained to discourage future traitors during future conflicts, it makes sense to forgive past offenders, after the enemy no longer exists which had attracted their support but a significant number remains in flight from authorities. In 1718, when a general pardon was offered to pirates by the British, its advocates hoped it would dissuade recipients from entering Spanish service while the countries were at war.

Amnesties to achieve peace are accompanied by effective Truth and Reconciliation Commissions. One particular case was in Uruguay: the Law on the Expiration of the Punitive Claims of the State put an end to unsolved issues deriving from 12 years of civic-military dictatorship. The 1989 Uruguayan amnesty referendum confirmed the law by 56% of the popular vote.

Amnesty is often used to encourage people to turn in contraband, as in the case of China's gun restrictions, or the Kansas City ban on pit bulls. Several public schools with a zero-tolerance policy on drugs or weapons have an "amnesty box" in which students may dispose of contraband objects brought to school without consequence.

Advantages of using amnesty may include avoiding expensive prosecutions (especially when massive numbers of violators are involved), prompting violators to come forward who might otherwise have eluded authorities, and promoting reconciliation between offenders and society. An example of the latter was the amnesty that was granted to conscientious objectors and draft evaders in the wake of the Vietnam War in the 1970s, in an effort by President Jimmy Carter to heal war wounds, given that both the war and the draft were over.

== Opposition ==
Amnesty can result in impunity and miscarriage of justice. The Ugandan government's offer not to prosecute alleged war criminal Joseph Kony was commented by David Smock: "The downside of it is the impunity that it implies; that people can commit atrocities and say that they will only stop if they are given amnesty..." Courts have rejected amnesties for most serious crimes which include genocide, crimes against humanity, and war crimes.

== History ==
The earliest recorded amnesty is of Thrasybulus at Athens, the thirty tyrants and a few others were expressly excluded from its operation; and the amnesty proclaimed on the restoration of Charles II of England did not extend to those who had taken part in the execution of his father. Other famous amnesties include: Napoleon's amnesty of March 13, 1815, from which thirteen eminent persons, including Talleyrand, were exempt; the Prussian amnesty of August 10, 1840; the general amnesty proclaimed by the Emperor Franz Josef I of Austria in 1857; the general amnesty granted by President of the United States, Andrew Johnson, after the American Civil War (1861–1865), in 1868, and the French amnesty of 1905. Amnesty in U.S. politics in 1872 meant restoring the right to vote and hold office to ex-Confederates, which was achieved by act of Congress.

== By country ==
In the United States the Immigration Reform and Control Act of 1986—signed into law by President Ronald Reagan on November 6, 1986—granted amnesty to about 3 million illegal immigrants. California Republican Governor Arnold Schwarzenegger said an amnesty program like the one the federal government undertook in 1986 would be ill-advised today. "It backfired big-time. It sent the wrong message: You come here illegally, and then we go and give you amnesty. So then, the next million come and they say, 'Hey, we get amnesty, this is really terrific'." At the United States Military Academy, United States Air Force Academy, and the United States Naval Academy, any head of state visiting the academy may ask the Superintendent to grant amnesty to members of the Corps of Cadets with outstanding punishment tours, freeing the restricted cadets from further punishment tours. In the past this was for all offenses, but in recent times only cadets with minor offenses (company board) are eligible for amnesty, while cadets with major offenses (regimental or higher board) are ineligible.

In the United Kingdom amnesty may be granted by the crown or by an act of Parliament, were formerly usual on coronations and similar occasions, but are chiefly exercised towards associations of political criminals, and are sometimes granted absolutely, though more frequently there are certain specified exceptions.

Amnesty was used in South Africa, during the 1990s, as part of the TRC (Truth and Reconciliation).

== See also ==
- Blackstone's ratio
- Error of impunity
- Legal remedy
- Recidivism
- Reparation (legal)
- Restitution and unjust enrichment
- Right to an effective remedy
- Right to truth
- Victims' rights
