= Pablo Gómez Niada =

Chilean prosecutor

Pablo Gómez

Prosecutor of the Soquimich corruption case
- In office 11 December 2015 – 2018
- Appointed by: Jorge Abbott
- Succeeded by: Claudia Perivancich

Personal details
- Spouse: Patricia Pérez Goldberg
- Education: Pontifical Catholic University of Valparaíso (LL.B)
- Occupation: Prosecutor; University teacher
- Profession: Lawyer

Pablo Andrés Gómez Niada is a Chilean lawyer who served as a prosecutor of the Soquimich (SQM) mega-corruption case from 2015 to 2018.

In 2015, he was appointed by Jorge Abbott as a prosecutor of the SQM case. For some lawyers, as the current constituent Mauricio Daza said in 2015, his appointment was a fierce mistake due to 'his lack of experience in bribery offenses' and also for his 'historical link with the former president Sebastián Piñera' (due to his marriage with Patricia Pérez Goldberg, former minister of Piñera).

During the 2019–2020 Chilean protests ―the Social Outbreak ('Estallido Social')― under Piñera's second government (2018−2022), Gómez was an adviser of the Ministry of the Interior.
