= Alfredo Moreno Charme =

Chilean diplomat (born 1956)

Alfredo Moreno
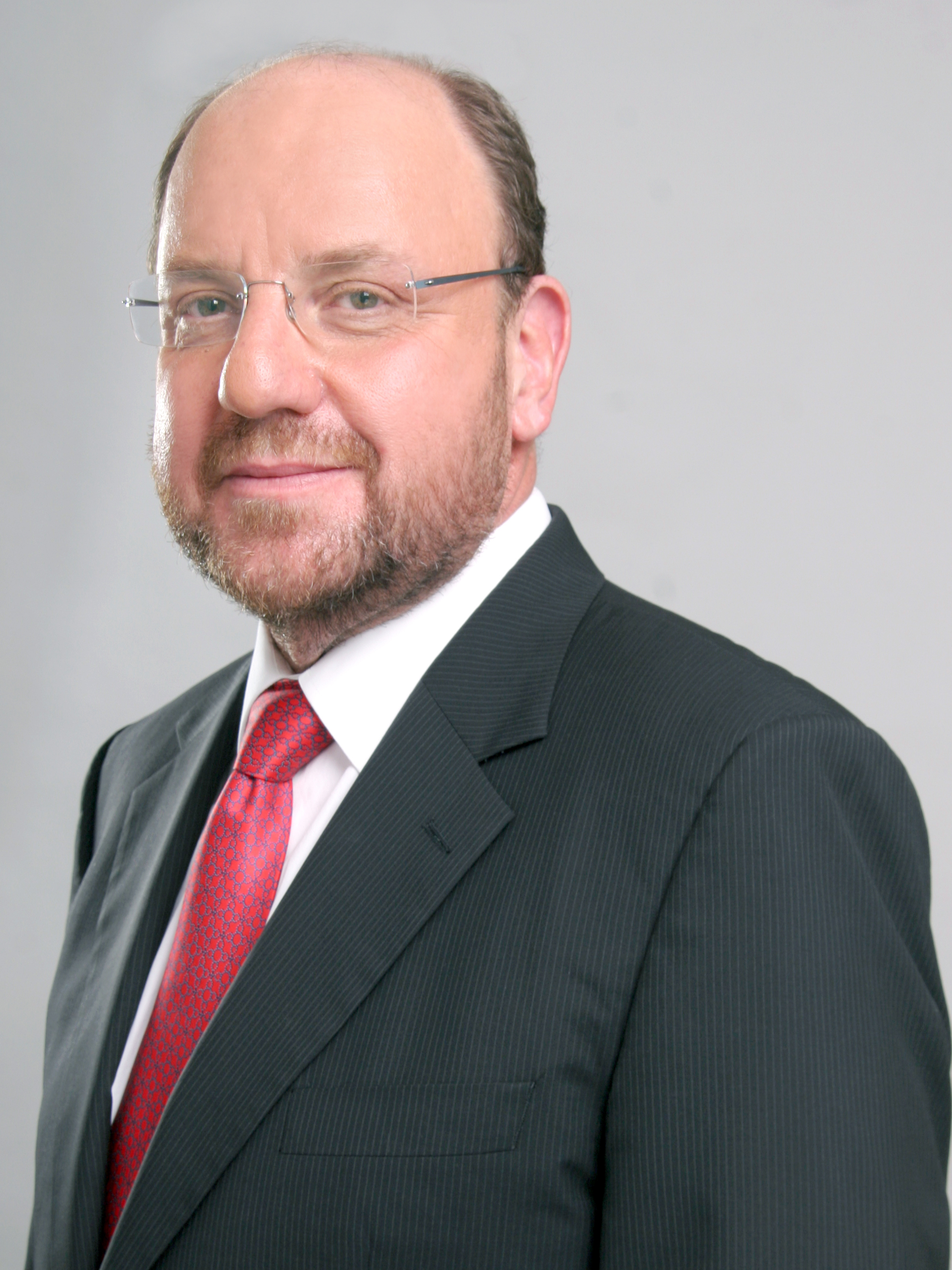

Minister of Public Works
- In office 13 June 2019 – 11 March 2022
- President: Sebastian Piñera
- Preceded by: Juan Andrés Fontaine
- Succeeded by: Juan Carlos García

Foreign Affairs Minister
- In office 11 March 2010 – 11 March 2014
- Appointed by: Sebastián Piñera
- Preceded by: Mariano Fernández
- Succeeded by: Heraldo Muñoz

Personal details
- Born: 4 August 1956 (age 70) Valparaíso, Chile
- Spouse: Ana María Echeverría
- Children: 4
- Education: Pontifical Catholic University of Chile (BS); University of Chicago (MBA)

Alfredo Moreno Charme (born August 4, 1956) is a Chilean diplomat and politician.

Charme was born in Valparaíso, Chile. He was the Minister of Foreign Affairs of Chile under President Sebastián Piñera.

== Biography ==
=== Family ===
He was born as one of the four children of the marriage between Alfredo Moreno Aguirre and Gloria Charme Montt, members of an influential family from Viña del Mar. Moreno Aguirre, one of the key executives in the early development of Coca-Cola in Chile, died of a heart attack in December 1970 at the age of 48, when Moreno Charme was still a teenager.

He is a cousin of Jorge Abbott, lawyer and National Prosecutor of Chile. He is also the great-grandson of politician, physician and minister Eduardo Charme Fernández.

=== Education ===
He studied at Colegio San Ignacio El Bosque in Santiago, graduating in 1973 as the top student of his class. During his school years he developed an interest in politics and ran for president of the student council on a list supported by the center-left and the Christian Democratic Party (PDC), a party with which he sympathized at the time, following his mother’s political leanings.

He later pursued business administration and industrial civil engineering at the Pontificia Universidad Católica de Chile, where he again graduated as the top student of his cohort.

He subsequently traveled to the United States on scholarship to complete a Master of Business Administration (MBA) at the University of Chicago. Upon returning to Chile, he served as a full-time professor at the School of Administration of the Pontificia Universidad Católica between 1982 and 1985.

=== Marriage and children ===
He has been married since 1980 to Ana María Echeverría, with whom he has four children: Alfredo, Francisco, Felipe and Ana María.

== Business career ==
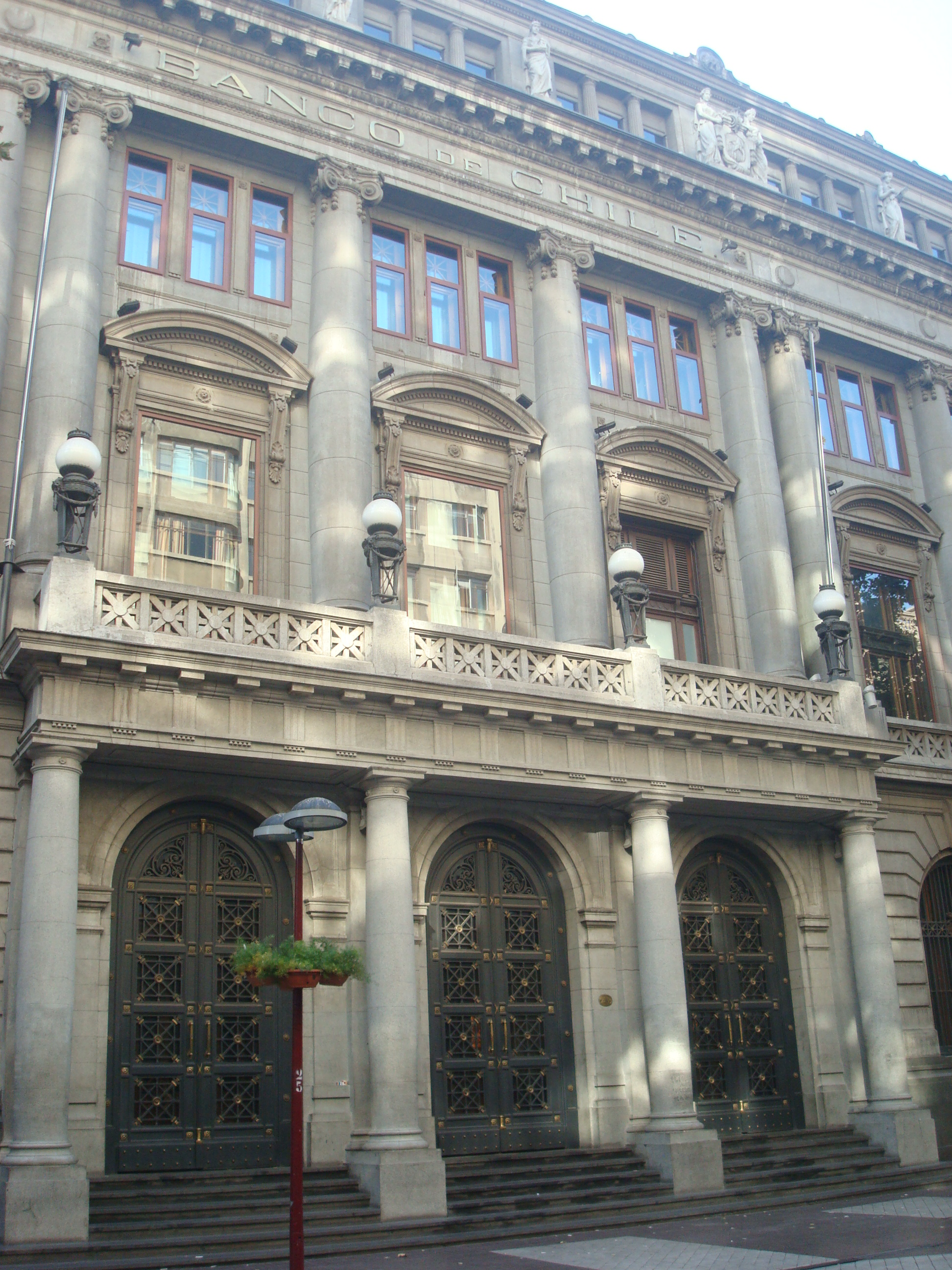
Headquarters of the Banco de Chile in downtown Santiago, where Alfredo Moreno served as board member for 14 years.

=== Beginnings ===
During his two years in Chicago, he shared classes, among others, with Francisco Pérez Mackenna, with whom he formed a close friendship, later joined by businessman Juan Bilbao, whom he had known since school. The three founded a consulting firm in Chile called Bilbao, Moreno y Pérez Asociados, which operated until 1986.

He later worked managing the communications division of the Cruzat Group, which included the magazines Ercilla, Vea and Deporte Total, as well as Radio Minería and Radio Galaxia.

In the mid-1980s, his entrepreneurial activity expanded through Editorial Santiago, a company he owned that, in addition to publishing books, developed a business model based on newspaper supplements and serialized publications. He later owned Telemercados Europa, a home grocery delivery company, and diversified into agriculture and horse breeding.

=== Banco de Chile ===
On 15 April 1987, he joined the board of the Banco de Chile, following the restructuring process after the 1983 banking intervention and subsequent “popular capitalism” phase. He initially served as director representing the Patronato Nacional de la Infancia, which retained sufficient shares to appoint two board members.

Over time, he acquired an ownership stake and strengthened ties with Carlos Alberto Délano and Carlos Eugenio Lavín, principal shareholders of the bank through Penta Group. By the late 1990s he had joined the controlling shareholders’ pact, alongside the Cúneo-Solari family (of Falabella), Consorcio Financiero and Sergio Larraín.

In 2000, he negotiated the sale of 34.6% of the bank—held by the controlling pact—to the Luksic Group.

After leaving Banco de Chile, he became vice president of Dersa, the Del Río family conglomerate, acting as close advisor to José Luis del Río. In that role, he participated in the merger between Dersa subsidiary Sodimac and Falabella, which earned him a seat on Falabella’s board. He also took part in the failed attempt to merge the newly formed retail giant with supermarket chain D&S

During this period he was an active member of Icare and the Fundación Teletón, serving as president of the former (2005–2006) and the latter (2008–2010).

After leaving government in 2014, he returned to the private sector, becoming president of the insurance company and Banco Penta, as well as board member of Derco S.A. and construction firm Brotec S.A., also serving on subsidiaries in other South American countries.
