= Thomas Buergenthal =

Czechoslovak-born American judge (1934–2023)

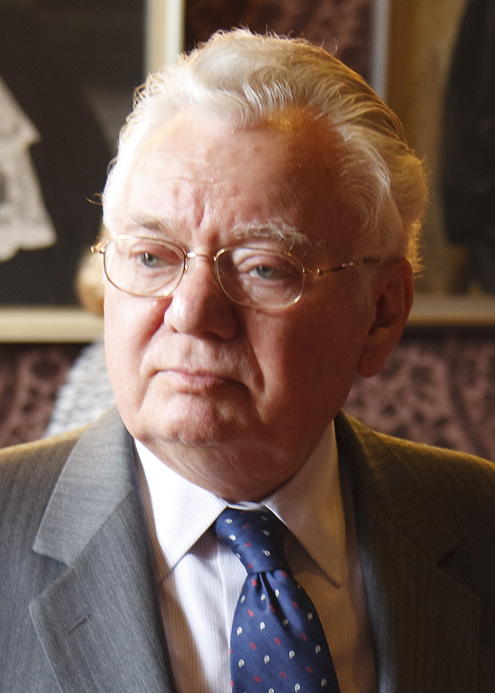
- Buergenthal in 2010

President of the Inter-American Court of Human Rights
- In office 1985–1987
- Preceded by: Pedro Nikken
- Succeeded by: Rafael Nieto Navia

Personal details
- Born: 11 May 1934 Ľubochňa, Czechoslovakia (now Slovakia)
- Died: 29 May 2023 (aged 89) Miami, Florida, U.S.
- Education: Bethany College (BA); New York University (JD); Harvard University (LLM, SJD)

Thomas Buergenthal (11 May 1934 – 29 May 2023) was a Czechoslovak-born American international lawyer, scholar, law school dean, and judge of the International Court of Justice (ICJ). He resigned his ICJ post as of 6 September 2010 and returned to his position at The George Washington University Law School where he was the Lobingier Professor Emeritus of Comparative Law and Jurisprudence.

== Early life ==
Thomas Buergenthal was known as one of the youngest holocaust victims to survive concentration camps like Auschwitz and Sachsenhausen. The first 11 years of his life were spent under German authority. It is known that when the Germans were pushed out by the Soviet army in January 1945, the Germans forced the victims out by marching them; it was a long journey, people began to get tired and if they stopped they were executed. Buergenthal was one of the few children to survive the three-day march to Sachsenhausen, where Buergenthal would soon be liberated. His mother was liberated from a different concentration camp around the same time, though they did not find each other until 1946. His father was killed shortly before liberation in yet another camp. Buergenthal, born to German-Jewish/Polish-Jewish parents who had moved from Germany to Czechoslovakia in 1933, grew up in the Jewish ghetto of Kielce (Poland) and later in the concentration camps at Auschwitz and Sachsenhausen. After the War he lived with his mother in Göttingen.

On 4 December 1951, he emigrated from Germany to the United States. He studied at Bethany College in West Virginia (graduated 1957) and received his J.D. at New York University Law School in 1960 and his LL.M. and S.J.D. degrees in international law from Harvard Law School. Judge Buergenthal is the recipient of numerous honorary degrees from American, European and Latin American Universities, including the University of Heidelberg in Germany, the Free University of Brussels in Belgium, the State University of New York, the American University, the University of Minnesota, and the George Washington University.

== Career ==
Buergenthal was a specialist in international law and human rights law.

Buergenthal served as a judge on the International Court of Justice at The Hague from 2 March 2000 to his resignation on 6 September 2010. Prior to his election to the International Court of Justice, he was the Lobingier Professor of Comparative Law and Jurisprudence at The George Washington University Law School. He was Dean of Washington College of Law of American University from 1980 to 1985 and held endowed professorships at the University of Texas, SUNY/Buffalo Law School, and Emory University. While at Emory, he was the director of the Human Rights Program of the Carter Center. Buergenthal served as a judge for many years, including lengthy periods on various specialized international bodies. Between 1979 and 1991, he served as a judge of the Inter-American Court of Human Rights, including a term as that court's president; from 1989 to 1994, he was a judge on the Inter-American Development Bank's Administrative Tribunal; in 1992 and 1993, he served on the United Nations Truth Commission for El Salvador; and from 1995 to 1999, he was a member of the United Nations Human Rights Committee.

Buergenthal was the author of more than a dozen books and a large number of articles on international law, human rights and comparative law subjects. He was member of a number of editorial boards of law journals, including the American Journal of International Law. He also served as a member of the Ethics Commission of the International Olympic Committee.

On 9 July 2004, Judge Buergenthal was the sole dissenter in the advisory opinion on the Israeli West Bank barrier, where the ICJ found 14-1 that the Israeli-built barrier into the occupied West Bank violated international law and should be torn down. While he stated that Israeli settlements were illegal under the Fourth Geneva Convention and that the Palestinians had the right of self-determination, Judge Buergenthal felt that the court hadn’t looked into the question of self-defense adequately.

Judge Buergenthal was a co-recipient of the 2008 Gruber Prize for Justice for his contributions to the promotion and protection of human rights in different parts of the world, particularly in Latin America. He was also a recipient of the following awards: Goler T. Butcher Medal, American Society of International Law, 1997; Manley O. Hudson Medal, American Society of International Law, 2002; Elie Wiesel Award, U.S. Holocaust Memorial Council, 2015; and Olympic Order, International Olympic Committee, 2015.

Buergenthal strongly supported the creation of the International Nuremberg Principles Academy in Nuremberg, Germany, and became the first President of its Advisory Council in 2014. From 2016 until his death in 2023, he served as its Honorary President.

His memoir, A Lucky Child, which describes his experience in various German-run concentration camps, has been translated into more than a dozen languages, including German, French, Spanish, Japanese, Dutch, Norwegian and Swedish.

== Death ==
Buergenthal died on 29 May 2023 at the age of 89. He is survived by his wife, three sons, two stepchildren, and ten grandchildren, of whom two are lawyers.

== Selected works ==
- Law-making in the International Civil Aviation Organization. Syracuse University Press. 1969. ISBN 978-0815621393.
- Sohn, Louis B.; Buergenthal, Thomas (1973). International Protection of Human Rights. Vol. 1. Bobbs-Merrill. ISBN 9780672818738. Vol. 2 ISBN 9780672821875 Vol. 3 ISBN 9780672842276
- Buergenthal, Thomas; Shelton, Dinah (1995). Protecting Human Rights in the Americas: Cases and materials (4th ed.). N.P. Engel. ISBN 978-3883571225.
- Kokott, Juliane; Buergenthal, Thomas; Maier, Harold G. (2003). Grundzüge des Völkerrechts (in German) (3rd ed.). UTB Uni-Taschenbücher Verlag. ISBN 978-3825215118.
- A Lucky Child. Little Brown. 2007. ISBN 978-1-61523-720-3.
- Buergenthal, Thomas; Thürer, Daniel (2010). Menschenrechte: Ideale, Instrumente, Institutionen (in German). Nomos Verlagsgesellschaft. ISBN 978-3832951252.
- Buergenthal, Thomas; Shelton, Dinah; Stewart, David; Vazquez, Carlos (2017). International Human Rights in a Nutshell (5th ed.). West Academic Publishing. ISBN 978-1634605984., Thomas, Shelton, Stewart, 4th ed. (2009)
- Buergenthal, Thomas; Murphy, Sean D. (2018). Public International Law in a Nutshell (6 ed.). West Academic. ISBN 9781683282396., 5th ed. (2013), 4th ed. (2007)

== Lectures ==
A Brief History of International Human Rights Law in the Lecture Series of the United Nations Audiovisual Library of International Law

"The Lawmaking Role of International Tribunals," Dean Fred F. Herzog Memorial Lecture, 17 October 2011, The John Marshall Law School, Chicago, Illinois.

Legal offices
Preceded by Pedro Nikken	President of the Inter-American Court of Human Rights; 1985–1987	Succeeded by Rafael Nieto Navia
