= Patricia Pérez Goldberg =

Chilean lawyer and politician

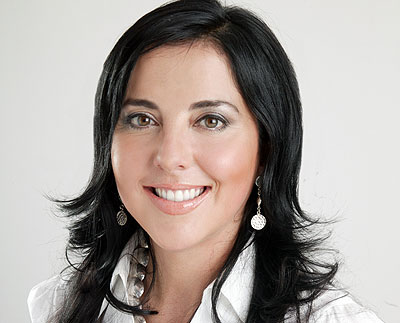
- Patricia Pérez Goldberg, 2012

Judge of the Inter-American Court of Human Rights
- Incumbent
- Assumed office 1 January 2022
- Preceded by: Eduardo Vio Grossi

Minister of Justice of Chile
- In office 17 December 2012 – 11 March 2014
- President: Sebastián Piñera
- Preceded by: Teodoro Ribera
- Succeeded by: José Antonio Gómez

Personal details
- Born: 22 February 1974 (age 52) Santiago, Chile
- Spouse: Pablo Gómez Niada
- Children: 2
- Education: University of Valparaíso (LL.B); Pontifical Catholic University of Valparaíso (LL.M)
- Profession: Lawyer

Patricia Carolina Pérez Goldberg (born 22 February 1974) is a Chilean lawyer and politician. From 2016, she has served as a judge at the Inter-American Court of Human Rights. She was Minister of Justice (2012–2014) during President Sebastián Piñera's first government.

== Early life and education ==
Pérez is daughter of a Carabineros officer and of a housewife. She grew up in Valparaíso.

She studied law at Universidad de Valparaíso and later completed a Master in Criminal Law and Criminal Sciences at Pontificia Universidad Católica de Valparaíso. She also completed a diploma course on criminal procedure reform in 2001 at Universidad de Chile Faculty of Law.

== Professional and public career ==
Between 2000 and 2001, she served as chief attorney of the Legal Aid Corporation in the Valparaíso Region. She later joined the Studies Unit of the Public Criminal Defense Office in Valparaíso, an institution she entered in 2004.

She has taught at the Pontifical Catholic University of Valparaíso and the Adolfo Ibáñez University.

In 2007, she was included among Chile's 100 Leading Women by the "Economía y Negocios" section of El Mercurio and the organization Mujeres Empresarias.

On 11 March 2010, she assumed office as Undersecretary of Justice during the first administration of President Sebastián Piñera.

On 17 December 2012, she was appointed Minister of Justice following the resignation of Teodoro Ribera. During her tenure, she faced a prolonged national strike by officials of the Civil Registry and Identification Service and allegations of irregularities and mistreatment in facilities administered by the National Service for Minors (SENAME). Her term ended on 11 March 2014 with the conclusion of the administration.

In October 2015, she was appointed Registrar of Property in Villa Alemana.

In February 2021, she was nominated as a candidate for judge of the Inter-American Court of Human Rights. She was elected later that year for the 2022–2027 term.
