= A Lucky Child =

Book by Thomas Buergenthal

A Lucky Child: A Memoir of Surviving Auschwitz as a Young Boy
- Author: Thomas Buergenthal
- Subject: The Holocaust
- Genre: Autobiography, memoir, novel
- Publication date: 2007

A Lucky Child: A Memoir of Surviving Auschwitz as a Young Boy (2007) is a memoir written by Thomas Buergenthal, in the vein of Night by Elie Wiesel or My Brother's Voice (2003) by Stephen Nasser, in which he recounts the astounding story of his surviving the Holocaust as a ten-year-old child owing to his wits and some remarkable strokes of luck. The book chronicles the author's life in Czechoslovakia and escape from a concentration camp. The book's title refers to the author's mother, Mutti, who while consulting a fortune-teller in Katowice, Poland was told that her child was "ein Glückskind" – a lucky child – an accurate prophecy in light of future events. Author Buergenthal's father, in response to the prophecy commented that "The only thing that fortune-teller knows that we don't know is how to make money in these bad times."

== Background ==
Thomas Buergenthal was born on May 11, 1934, in Ľubochňa, Czechoslovakia to Jewish parents of German and Polish extraction. Buergenthal was a judge on the International Court of Justice at The Hague and is regarded as a specialist in international and human rights law. A Lucky Child has been translated into more than a dozen languages and features a Foreword by Nobel Laureate Elie Wiesel. Ellen Keohane reported that when Thomas Buergenthal first sought an English-language publisher for this book, he was told, "Holocaust books don't sell." The book first came out in Germany in 2007 and became a bestseller there. It was finally published in the US in 2009.

== The book ==
=== Parents ===
Thomas' father Mundek was born in Galicia (Eastern Europe), a region of Poland that belonged to the Austro-Hungarian Empire before the First World War and received his education in German and Polish. He moved to Berlin, where he worked for a private Jewish bank, eventually managing the bank's investment portfolio. However, the rise of Hitler and growing violence against Jews caused Buergenthal senior to leave Germany for Ľubochňa in Czechoslovakia where he owned and managed a resort hotel. There he met Gerda Silbergleit, Thomas' future mother, a 20-year-old German Jewish young woman on vacation from Göttingen. Thomas's parents were engaged within three days of meeting at the German-Czech border and Thomas was born eleven months later.

=== Early life ===
In 1938 or early 1939, the Buergenthal's hotel was confiscated by the Hlinka Guard, a Slovak fascist party, and the family eventually moved to Katowice, Poland. At the time, Thomas was five years old. When Germany invaded Poland, the family sought refuge in Kielce, Poland, a city with a large Jewish population (then 25,000). When the Kielce Ghetto was established by order of the Schutzpolizei, the Buergenthals did not have to move since their one-room apartment (they were now nearly destitute) was located in the area which became designated as the ghetto of Kielce.

Life in the ghetto was difficult because of both the shortage of food and the increasing paranoia brought on by random German razzias, or raids. There were also informants ready to denounce other ghetto residents to the Germans for any kind of edge for themselves. "Yes, the walls have ears", Buergenthal senior would often say. Initially in the Kielce Ghetto, Mundek worked as a cook's helper. The irony of his investment banker father working as an assistant cook was lost on the young Thomas. Subsequently, Tommy's father was put in charge of the Werkstatt, or ghetto factory, just outside the ghetto walls.

In an early morning in August 1942, when the liquidation of the Kielce Ghetto began, Thomas' father bluffed his way out of the ghetto, Werkstatt papers in hand, with his family and a handful of workers in tow, to avoid immediate deportation to the Treblinka extermination camp. This was young Thomas' first brush with death. The surviving residents of the ghetto ended up in the Arbeitslager or work camp, in a small portion of the original ghetto. During the ultimate liquidation of the Arbeitslager, children were torn from their mothers and murdered in gruesome fashion in the Jewish cemetery of Kielce. During the roundup Mundek marched up to the commandant holding little Tommy's hand when young Thomas blurted out "Herr Hauptmann, ich kann arbeiten" – "Captain, I can work", and the skeptical commandant replied "That we shall soon see", and young Thomas was saved from certain death a second time.

Thomas' family were now transferred to a large saw mill in Henryków, Świętokrzyskie Voivodeship, where young Thomas, because of his Polish and German language skills, was hired as an errand boy to the whip wielding city and mill manager, a German named Fuss. In this role nine-year-old Tommy, having advance warning of Fuss' surprise visits, warned mill workers and saved quite a few from severe beatings. Witnessing beatings and hangings of factory workers in Henrykow, Tommy nevertheless witnessed, on the parts of some of the victims acts of bravery and gallantry which gave rise to his growing conviction that, "Moral resistance in the face of evil is no less courageous than physical resistance."

=== Concentration camps ===
One morning in July 1944, when Thomas was ten years old, his family was deported to Auschwitz-Birkenau. Incredibly, there was no selection upon arrival at Birkenau because the SS officers in charge assumed that, since this transport came from a work camp, all children, the old and the infirm, that is, those unable to work had been eliminated already. Thus, young Thomas was admitted to Birkenau and eluded immediate death a third time.

After arriving in the "Gypsy Camp" in Auschwitz-Birkenau, Tommy eluded death on numerous occasions with the help of his father. Mundek developed a simple strategy to beat the system by having Tommy stand near the back and very close to the entrance to the barracks at the obligatory "Appell", or roll call, but melting away and hiding in the barracks when it appeared that Appell would be followed by a Selection, where each Muselmann and child was a target for the gas chambers.

Nevertheless, on one occasion, young Tommy was snared in a special selection for the gas chambers. However, this particular group was relatively small and Tommy and the other prisoners selected were transferred to a staging barracks (where inmates with scabies were also quarantined) while a sizeable group was built up over several weeks which could be gassed more efficiently. During this period the young Polish doctor responsible for the quarantine barracks tore up Tommy's card (marked with a red X) and issued a new unmarked card. When the SS came early one morning to drag Tommy's group to the gas chambers, Tommy was not among them. Incredibly, he slept through the entire incident (thinking it was a nightmare) and successfully cheated death once again.

In early January 1945, Auschwitz-Birkenau was evacuated in what became known as the Auschwitz Death March. Relatively early in the march the SS guards decided that children were slowing down the process and called the children out from among thousands of marchers "to rest in a convent". Tommy and his young friends refused to comply and thus eluded death once again.

The marchers were now loaded into open freight cars and after more than ten days reached Germany, where Tommy eventually wound up with frozen feet in the infirmary at the Sachsenhausen concentration camp, where two of his toes were amputated. Sachsenhausen was liberated by the Russian army on April 22, 1945, and Tommy was saved.

=== After liberation ===
Eleven-year-old Tommy saw the fall of Berlin dressed in a custom made uniform as the unofficial ward of a Company of the Polish Army. After the Surrender of Germany he lived in a Polish orphanage until he was reunited with his mother, who also survived, in Göttingen. Tommy immigrated to the US, arriving in New York City on December 4, 1951. He graduated from Bethany College (West Virginia), and New York University School of Law. He earned Master of Law and Doctor of Juridical Science degrees from Harvard University. Thomas Buergenthal dedicated himself to international law, concluding that he had a moral obligation to devote his professional life to the protection of human rights.

== Analysis ==
In his New York Times article "The Science of Evil", Simon Baron-Cohen cites a scene from A Lucky Child. In the book an inmate was forced to hang his friend who had tried to escape. An SS guard ordered the inmate to put a noose around his friend's neck. Baron-Cohen points out that the guard's behavior was not meant merely to punish or deter. The guard chose this particular form of punishment because he wanted the two friends to suffer. In fact, "cruelty for its own sake was a part of ordinary Nazi guards' behavior. Sadly, there is no shortage of horrific examples..."

In the hanging scene above the man ordered to hang his friend could not comply because his hands were shaking so violently from fear and distress. His friend took the noose, and, in a remarkable act, kissed his friend's hand and then put the noose around his own neck. Young Thomas, then nine years old, witnessed this act of chivalry and similar selfless acts by prisoners of the Kielce Ghetto, the Henryków Werkstatt and the Auschwitz and Sachsenhausen concentration camps. Tommy derived strength from such gallant and selfless acts in the face of adversity and these experiences were, in fact, the genesis of his lifelong commitment to human rights. By contrast, empathy or acts of compassion by Nazi concentration camp guards towards prisoners, especially Jews, were rare, but they did occur. For example, an SS guard on a prisoner transport wordlessly handed young Tommy his cup of coffee when he saw Tommy longingly gazing at it. Buergenthal notes that although there were many committed Nazis, there was also the 'Mitlaufer' or 'fellow traveler' who joined the Nazi party for other reasons, such as economic gain.

Young Thomas' journey from the Kielce Ghetto to the Sachsenhausen concentration camp is nothing short of amazing. Due to the five decades that elapsed between the incidents detailed and the writing of the book, the author describes the most wrenching scenes with a detachment that makes the account less traumatic for the reader. The author poses questions about human character which are profound and may have no clear answers.

Elizabeth McCracken, author of "An Exact Replica of a Figment of My Imagination" referred to A Lucky Child as "an extraordinary story... Heartbreaking and thrilling, it examines what it means to be human, in every good and awful sense."

== Quotes from A Lucky Child ==
"Moral resistance in the face of evil is no less courageous than physical resistance."

"...why, in the midst of all these terrible events, some people find the strength and moral courage to oppose, or at the very least, not commit these monstrous crimes that others perpetrate with ease."

"Besides testing the morality of those who became neither informers or Kapos, the concentration camps were laboratories for the survival of the brutish."

"What is in the human character that gives some individuals moral strength not to sacrifice their decency and dignity, regardless of the costs to themselves, whereas others become murderously ruthless in the hope of ensuring their own survival?"
