= Inter-American Court of Human Rights =

Autonomous judicial institution

Coordinates: 9°55′49.58″N 84°3′24.98″W

- Corte Interamericana de Derechos Humanos (Spanish); Corte Interamericana de Direitos Humanos (Portuguese); Cour interaméricaine des droits de l'homme (French)
- Established: 22 May 1979; 47 years ago
- Jurisdiction: Member states within the Americas
- Location: San José, Costa Rica
- Authorised by: American Convention on Human Rights; Statute of the Inter-American Court of Human Rights
- Judge term length: Six years
- Number of positions: Seven
- Website: www.corteidh.or.cr/index.cfm?lang=en

President
- Currently: Nancy Hernández López
- Since: 2024

Vice-President
- Currently: Rodrigo Mudrovitsch
- Since: 2024

The Inter-American Court of Human Rights (I/A Court H.R.) is an international court based in San José, Costa Rica. Together with the Inter-American Commission on Human Rights, it was formed by the American Convention on Human Rights, a human rights treaty ratified by members of the Organization of American States (OAS).

Pursuant to American Convention, the Inter-American Court works with the Inter-American Commission to uphold and promote basic rights and freedoms recognized in instruments including the American Convention and the American Declaration of the Rights and Duties of Man. It has jurisdiction within around 20 of the 35 member states in the American continent that have taken steps to accede to its authority, the vast majority in Latin America. The court adjudicates claims of human rights violations by governments, and issues advisory opinions on interpretations of certain legal matters. Twenty-nine OAS members are also members of the wider-scale International Criminal Court.

== Purpose and functions ==
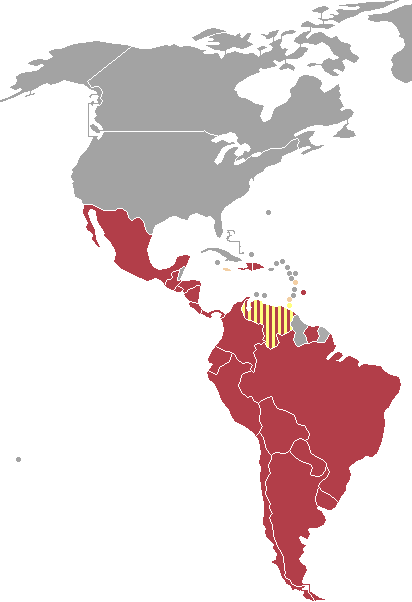
Members of the I/A Court H.R. Dark red – accept blanket jurisdiction of the court Orange – signatories not accepting full jurisdiction Yellow – former members

The Organization of American States established the Court in 1979 to enforce and interpret the provisions of the American Convention on Human Rights. Its two main functions are thus adjudicatory and advisory. Under the former, it hears and rules on the specific cases of human rights violations referred to it. Under the latter, it issues opinions on matters of legal interpretation brought to its attention by other OAS bodies or member states.

=== Adjudicatory function ===
The adjudicatory function requires the Court to rule on cases brought before it in which a state party to the convention, and thus has accepted its jurisdiction, is accused of a human rights violation.

In addition to ratifying the convention, a state party must voluntarily submit to the Court's jurisdiction for it to be competent to hear a case involving that state. Acceptance of contentious jurisdiction can be given on a blanket basis – to date, Argentina, Barbados, Bolivia, Brazil, Chile, Colombia, Costa Rica, the Dominican Republic, Ecuador, El Salvador, Guatemala, Haiti, Honduras, Mexico, Nicaragua, Panama, Paraguay, Peru, Suriname, Trinidad and Tobago, Venezuela and Uruguay have done so (though Trinidad and Tobago and Venezuela have subsequently withdrawn) – or, alternatively, a state can agree to abide by the Court's jurisdiction in a specific, individual case.

Under the convention, cases can be referred to the Court by either the Inter-American Commission on Human Rights or a state party. In contrast to the European human rights system, individual citizens of the OAS member states are not allowed to take cases directly to the Court.

The following conditions must be met:

- Individuals who believe that their rights have been violated must first lodge a complaint with the commission and have that body rule on the admissibility of the claim.
- If the case is ruled admissible and the state deemed at fault, the commission will generally serve the state with a list of recommendations to make amends for the violation.
- Only if the state fails to abide by these recommendations, or if the Commission decides that the case is of particular importance or legal interest, will the case be referred to the Court.
- The presentation of a case before the Court can therefore be considered a measure of last resort, taken only after the commission has failed to resolve the matter in a non-contentious fashion.

Proceedings before the Court are divided into written and oral phases.

==== Written phase ====
In the written phase, the case application is filed, indicating the facts of the case, the plaintiffs, the evidence and witnesses the applicant plans to present at trial, and the claims for redress and costs. If the application is ruled admissible by the Court's secretary, notice thereof is served on the judges, the state or the commission (depending on who lodged the application), the victims or their next-of-kin, the other member states, and OAS headquarters.

For 30 days following notification, any of the parties in the case may submit a brief containing preliminary objections to the application. If it deems necessary, the Court can convene a hearing to deal with the preliminary objections. Otherwise, in the interests of procedural economy, it can deal with the parties' preliminary objections and the merits of the case at the same hearing.

Within 60 days following notification, the respondent must supply a written answer to the application, stating whether it accepts or disputes the facts and claims it contains.

Once this answer has been submitted, any of the parties in the case may request the Court president's permission to lodge additional pleadings prior to the commencement of the oral phase.

==== Oral phase ====
The president sets the date for the start of oral proceedings, for which the Court is considered quorate with the presence of five judges.

During the oral phase, the judges may ask any question they see fit of any of the persons appearing before them. Witnesses, expert witnesses, and other persons admitted to the proceedings may, at the president's discretion, be questioned by the representatives of the commission or the state, or by the victims, their next-of-kin, or their agents, as applicable. The president is permitted to rule on the relevance of questions asked and to excuse the person asked the question from replying, unless overruled by the Court.

=== Ruling ===
After hearing the witnesses and experts and analyzing the evidence presented, the Court issues its judgment. Its deliberations are conducted in private and, once the judgment has been adopted, it is notified to all the parties involved. If the merits judgment does not cover the applicable reparations for the case, they must be determined at a separate hearing or through some other procedure as decided on by the Court.

The reparations the Court orders can be both monetary and non-monetary in nature. The most direct form of redress are cash compensation payments extended to the victims or their next-of-kin. However, the state can also be required to grant benefits in kind, to offer public recognition of its responsibility, to take steps to prevent similar violations occurring in the future, and other forms of non-monetary compensation.

For example, in its November 2001 judgment in the Barrios Altos case – dealing with the massacre in Lima, Peru, of 15 people at the hands of the state-sponsored Colina Group death squad in November 1991 – the Court ordered payments of US$175,000 for the four survivors and for the next-of-kin of the murdered victims and a payment of $250,000 for the family of one of the victims. It also required Peru:

- to grant the victims' families free health care and various forms of educational support, including scholarships and supplies of school uniforms, equipment, and books;
- to repeal two controversial amnesty laws;
- to establish the crime of extrajudicial killing in its domestic law;
- to ratify the International Convention on the Nonapplicability of Statutory Limitations to War Crimes and Crimes against Humanity;
- to publish the Court's judgment in the national media;
- to publicly apologize for the incident and to undertake to prevent similar events from recurring in the future;
- and to erect a memorial monument to the victims of the massacre.

While the Court's decisions admit no appeal, parties can lodge requests for interpretation with the Court secretary within 90 days of judgment being issued. When possible, requests for interpretation are heard by the same panel of judges that ruled on the merits.

=== Advisory function ===
The Court's advisory function enables it to respond to consultations submitted by OAS agencies and member states regarding the interpretation of the convention or other instruments governing human rights in the Americas; it also empowers it to give advice on domestic laws and proposed legislation, and to clarify whether or not they are compatible with the convention's provisions. This advisory jurisdiction is available to all OAS member states, not only those that have ratified the convention and accepted the Court's adjudicatory function. The Court's replies to these consultations are published separately from its contentious judgments, as advisory opinions.

== Ratification and membership ==
The American Convention on Human Rights entered into force in 1978. All Latin American countries but Cuba are members, as are Suriname and a few Anglophone countries in the Caribbean.

Trinidad and Tobago signed the convention on 28 May 1991 but suspended its ratification on 26 May 1998 (effective 26 May 1999) over the death penalty.

In 1999 under President Alberto Fujimori Peru announced it was withdrawing its acceptance of the Court's jurisdiction. This decision was reversed by the transitional government of Valentín Paniagua in 2001.

Venezuela withdrew from the convention in 2013 under the Nicolás Maduro government. On 15 May 2019, the National Assembly (opposition Guaidó government) nullified the withdrawal. In 2025, the Court ruled that "the American Convention on Human Rights is in force in Venezuela", while still addressing Maduro's government (rather than Guaidó's) as the government of Venezuela for the purposes of the proceedings.

The Dominican Republic stated in 2014 that it was withdrawing from the I/A Court H.R.; the withdrawal would have come into effect the following year. However, the I/A Court H.R. notes that the withdrawal was never legally implemented, and as of its 2017 annual report, the I/A Court H.R. still counted the Dominican Republic as a member.

The United States signed but never ratified the American Convention on Human Rights.

State	I/A Court H.R. alone	ICC alone	Both	Ratification of I/A Court H.R. convention	Recognition of jurisdiction	Withdrawal	Reinsertion
Antigua and Barbuda		*					
Argentina			*	1984	1984		
The Bahamas							
Barbados			*	1981	2000		
Belize		*					
Bolivia			*	1979	1993		
Brazil			*	1992	1998		
Canada		*					
Chile			*	1990	1990		
Colombia			*	1973	1985		
Costa Rica			*	1970	1980		
Cuba							
Dominica			*	1993			
Dominican Republic		?	?	1978	1999	?	
Ecuador			*	1977	1984		
El Salvador			*	1978	1995		
Grenada			*	1978			
Guatemala			*	1978	1987		
Guyana		*					
Haiti	*			1977	1998		
Honduras			*	1977	1981		
Jamaica	*			1978			
Mexico			*	1981	1998		
Nicaragua	*			1979	1991		
Panama			*	1978	1990		
Paraguay			*	1989	1993		
Peru			*	1978	1981		
Saint Kitts and Nevis		*					
Saint Lucia		*					
Saint Vincent and the Grenadines		*					
Suriname			*	1987	1987		
Trinidad and Tobago		*		1991	1991	1999	
United States							
Uruguay			*	1985	1985		
Venezuela			*	1977	1981	2013	2019 (Guaidó govt)

== Composition ==
The court consists of seven judges, held to the highest moral judgement who have a high competency in human rights law. These judges are elected to six-year terms by the OAS General Assembly; each judge may be reelected for an additional six-year term.

Recent policy changes state, when serving on the court, judges are expected to act as individuals, not representing their state. They must be OAS member states' nationals; however, they do not need to be individuals of a state that has ratified the American Convention or accepted jurisdiction of the Court. Judges are required to recuse themselves from cases involving their home country. States parties are no longer permitted to name a judge ad hoc to their case if a sitting judge is not from their country. If a judge is a national of one of the State Parties to the case, the State Parties can only designate a judge ad hoc if there are inter-state complaints. In order to be nominated as a judge, one must be a national of a member state of OAS, a jurist, have the 'highest moral authority', have high competency of human rights law, have 'the qualifications required for the exercise of the highest judicial functions in conformity with the law of the state of which they are nationals or of the state that proposes them as candidates'.

'Highest Moral Authority' is loosely defined by the ACHR as never having never been convicted of a crime, suspended or expelled from the legal profession, or dismissed from public office.

Judges are elected by State Parties to the convention from a list of nominated candidates. Each State Party may nominate up to three candidates, but if nominating three, at least one of the three must be a national of a state other than the nominating state. The Secretary General of the OAS organizes the candidates alphabetically and forwards it to the State Parties. The election consists of a secret ballot, requiring an absolute majority of the State Parties to the convention. Those who receive the most votes are elected.

After the Convention came into force on 18 July 1978, the first election of judges took place on 22 May 1979. The new Court first convened on 29 June 1979 at the Organization of American States Headquarters in Washington, D.C., United States.

== Criticism ==
The Court's behaviour has also been criticized. Among other issues, some authors have criticized the politicization of the Court. Furthermore, the process of nomination and election is a subject of criticism. It is not a transparent or accountable process at both the National and International levels. There is a push for the OAS to create an independent group in charge of evaluating candidates. Another independent group in charge of overseeing the national processes and ranking the candidates that is separate from OAS is a proposed initiative by scholars to address these criticisms. These would ensure that all candidates have been through two reviews on the National and International level before being able to be elected.

Fair representation when it comes to candidates is also a point of contention. Scholars have stated that State Parties should strive for equal representation in terms of geographic sub-regions, different ethnic and cultural groups, and female and male judges; however, this should be done without straying from the high standards and qualifications required for candidates.

"Highest Moral Authority", a requirement for nomination, is often criticized because its vagueness. The necessary qualifications are not clearly defined and vary from country to country. The minimum age ranges from none to 45 years old and the number of years of experience ranges from 10 to 15 years and only Paraguay requires candidates to have a PhD.

Some of the latest criticisms come from Peru and Venezuela. Venezuela subsequently withdrew from the system after President Hugo Chávez declared the court's decision to rule Venezuela guilty of holding a prisoner in inhumane jail conditions as invalid. Up to then, Trinidad and Tobago had been the only state to withdraw. Peru tried to do so, but did not follow the appropriate procedure.

== Personnel ==
=== Current judges ===
Name	State	Position	Term
Nancy Hernández López	Costa Rica	President	2023-2028
Rodrigo Mudrovitsch	Brazil	Vice President	2023-2028
Humberto Antonio Sierra Porto	Colombia	Judge	2013–2024
Eduardo Ferrer Mac-Gregor Poisot	Mexico	Judge	2013–2024
Ricardo Pérez Manrique	Uruguay	President	2023-2028
Verónica Gómez	Argentina	Judge	2023-2028
Patricia Pérez Goldberg	Chile	Judge	2023-2028

=== Former Presidents of the Court ===
Years	Country	Judge
2020–2021	Uruguay	Ricardo Pérez Manrique
2018–2019	Mexico	Eduardo Ferrer Mac-Gregor Poisot
2016–2017	Brazil	Roberto de Figueiredo Caldas
2014–2015	Colombia	Humberto Sierra Porto
2010–2013	Peru	Diego García Sayán
2008–2009	Chile	Cecilia Medina
2004–2007	Mexico	Sergio García Ramírez
1999–2003	Brazil	Antônio Augusto Cançado Trindade
1997–1999	Ecuador	Hernán Salgado Pesantes
1994–1997	Mexico	Héctor Fix Zamudio
1993–1994	Colombia	Rafael Nieto Navia
1990–1993	Mexico	Héctor Fix Zamudio
1989–1990	Uruguay	Héctor Gros Espiell
1987–1989	Colombia	Rafael Nieto Navia
1985–1987	United States	Thomas Buergenthal
1983–1985	Venezuela	Pedro Nikken
1981–1983	Honduras	Carlos Roberto Reina
1979–1981	Costa Rica	Rodolfo E. Piza Escalante

=== Former members of the Court ===
Year	State	Members of the Court	President
1979–1981	Colombia	César Ordóñez	
1979–1985	Venezuela	Máximo Cisneros Sánchez	
1979–1985	Jamaica	Huntley Eugene Munroe	
1979–1985	Honduras	Carlos Roberto Reina	1981–1983
1979–1989	Costa Rica	Rodolfo E. Piza Escalante	1979–1981
1979–1989	Venezuela	Pedro Nikken	1983–1985
1979–1991	United States	Thomas Buergenthal	1985–1987
1981–1994	Colombia	Rafael Nieto Navia	1987–1989, 1993–1994
1985–1989	Honduras	Jorge R. Hernández Alcerro	
1985–1990	Uruguay	Héctor Gros Espiell	1989–1990
1985–1997	Mexico	Héctor Fix-Zamudio	1990–1993, 1994–1997
1989–1991	Honduras	Policarpo Callejas	
1989–1991	Venezuela	Orlando Tovar Tamayo	
1989–1994	Costa Rica	Sonia Picado Sotela	
1990–1991	Argentina	Julio A. Barberis	
1991–1994	Venezuela	Asdrúbal Aguiar Aranguren	
1991–1997	Nicaragua	Alejandro Montiel Argüello	
1991–2003	Chile	Máximo Pacheco Gómez	
1991–2003	Ecuador	Hernán Salgado Pesantes	1997–1999
1998–2003	Colombia	Carlos Vicente de Roux-Rengifo	
1995–2006	Barbados	Oliver H. Jackman	
1995–2006	Venezuela	Alirio Abreu Burelli	
1995–2006	Brazil	Antônio Augusto Cançado Trindade	1999–2003
2001–2003	Argentina	Ricardo Gil Lavedra	
2004–2009	Mexico	Sergio García Ramírez	2004–2007
2004–2009	Chile	Cecilia Medina Quiroga	2008–2009
2004–2015	Costa Rica	Manuel Ventura Robles	
2004–2015	Peru	Diego García-Sayán	2010–2013
2007–2012	Jamaica	Margarette May Macaulay	
2007–2012	Dominican Republic	Rhadys Abreu Blondet	
2007–2012	Argentina	Leonardo A. Franco	
2010–2015	Uruguay	Alberto Pérez Pérez	
2013–2018	Brazil	Roberto de Figueiredo Caldas	2016–2017

== Notable cases heard by the Court ==
Case	Date	Ruling	Summary
Velásquez-Rodríguez v. Honduras	29 July 1988		Honduras liable for forced disappearance by failing to investigate it.
Caracazo v. Venezuela	11 November 1999		Numerous breaches by Venezuela including extrajudicial killings.
"The Last Temptation of Christ" (Olmedo-Bustos et al.) v. Chile	5 February 2001		Film censorship by Chile was a breach.
Barrios Altos v. Peru	14 March 2001		The massacre itself constituted multiple breaches, as did the Peruvian government's response of amnesty for those responsible.
Myrna Mack Chang v. Guatemala	25 November 2003		Guatemalan government found responsible for the killings.
Plan de Sánchez Massacre v. Guatemala	29 April 2004		Guatemalan government found responsible for the killings.
Herrera-Ulloa v. Costa Rica	2 July 2004		Conviction of La Nación newspaper for defamation by reproducing allegations made by foreign journalists breached its and its journalists' freedom of expression. The decision of the appeal court, which included the trial judges, to dismiss the appeal also breached their right to appeal to a higher court and to an impartial trial.
Lori Berenson-Mejía v. Peru	25 November 2004		The conditions of the applicant's punishment in prison and the procedure in her trial under military law were ruled to be in breach of Article 5.
Moiwana Community v. Suriname	15 June 2005		The court held the government responsible for the Moiwana massacre and ordered reparations.
"Mapiripán Massacre" v. Colombia	15 September 2005		Colombia admitted complicity in the massacre and was additionally found responsible for inhumane treatment of next of kin.
Almonacid-Arellano et al v. Chile	26 September 2006		The court held Chile responsible for an extrajudicial killing and failure to investigated it. The court also found that domestic courts must apply the ACHR.
Gomes Lund et al. ("Guerrilha do Araguaia") v. Brazil	24 November 2010		The court found Brazil's amnesty law with respect to the Araguaia Guerrilla War to be in breach. Brazil's Supreme Federal Court nonetheless later upheld the law.
Gelman v. Uruguay	24 February 2011		In addition to multiple substantive breaches involving forced disappearances, the 1986 Expiry Law was found to be in breach.
Atala Riffo and daughters v. Chile	24 February 2012		The Court found that sexual orientation was an unlawful ground of discrimination under Article 1 and so Chile could not deny custody of children on that basis.
Marcel Granier and other (Radio Caracas Television) v. Venezuela	22 June 2015		Venezuela was found to have unlawfully discriminated against the applicant in allocating radio frequencies on the basis of their editorial stance, in addition to due process breaches.
Massacre of Santo Domingo v. Colombia	30 November 2012		

== Advisory opinions ==
=== Advisory Opinion OC-23/17 ===
The 2017 Advisory Opinion OC-23/17 on Environment and Human Rights, issued by the I/A Court H.R., recognised the right to a healthy environment as an autonomous human right under the American Convention on Human Rights. The opinion, requested by Colombia, clarified that environmental degradation and climate change adversely affect human rights, particularly for vulnerable groups such as Indigenous peoples and children.

The Court established that the right to a healthy environment is "fundamental to the existence of humanity" and linked it to rights to life and personal integrity. It highlighted the following obligations for States:

- Prevention: States are obligated to regulate activities causing environmental harm.
- Assessment: States must conduct independent environmental impact assessments.
- Mitigation: States must mitigate existing environmental damage.
- Cooperation: States must notify and negotiate with other nations regarding transboundary harm and environmental emergencies.
- Procedural rights: States must ensure
  - guaranteed public access to environmental information,
  - participation in environmental decision-making, and
  - access to justice, including for non-residents affected by cross-border damage.

It also applied the precautionary principle, requiring states to act against environmental threats even amid scientific uncertainty. The opinion provided a basis for later climate litigation, including the I/A Court H.R.'s 2025 Advisory Opinion on Climate Change.

=== Advisory Opinion OC-32/25 ===
The I/A Court H.R. issued an Advisory Opinion OC-32/25 on July 3, 2025. The opinion was requested by Chile and Colombia in January 2023 amid growing climate litigation in Latin America. It is recognised as built upon prior I/A Court H.R. jurisprudence, such as the 2017 Advisory Opinion on Environment and Human Rights, which first established the autonomous right to a healthy environment and emphasises enhanced due diligence in climate policy. The opinion was also delivered in the same year as the International Court of Justice's (ICJ) Advisory Opinion on climate change (July 23, 2025) and followed the ITLOS Advisory Opinion (May 21, 2024), adding to a growing body of international guidance on climate obligations.

The opinion interprets the American Convention on Human Rights to include explicit state obligations in addressing climate change through a human rights framework. The Court took into consideration input from a multitude of stakeholders, including states, international bodies, civil society organizations, and academic institutions in arriving at this opinion, reflecting the growing concern over the impacts of climate change on human rights.

The opinion finds the Court affirming that states must take urgent measures to mitigate and adapt to climate change. The Court found that this includes making efforts to regulate corporate emissions, to adopt science-based measures to mitigate climate change - including regulating corporate emissions and setting enforceable targets aligned with the 1.5°C Paris Agreement goal, to combat climate misinformation & ensure public participation in climate policymaking, and to protect vulnerable groups, including Indigenous peoples and future generations. It also reaffirmed the right to a healthy environment as an autonomous human right and that nature itself can hold rights.

The Court also described the duty to prevent irreversible environmental damage as a potential jus cogens norm of international law.

== See also ==
- European Court of Human Rights, regional court originally established in 1959
- African Court on Human and Peoples' Rights, regional court established in 2006
- International Criminal Court
