= Fred F. Herzog =

Fred F. Herzog was an Austrian-American jurist and former Dean of IIT Chicago-Kent College of Law and The John Marshall Law School in Chicago.

Herzog was born in Prague on September 21, 1907. At the time of his birth, Prague was the capital of Bohemia, in the Austro-Hungarian Empire. Fred Herzog grew up in Graz, Austria. His father was Professor David Herzog, a professor of philology who specialized in ancient Semitic languages. His father was also the chief Rabbi of Graz and of the surrounding area of Styria in Upper Austria.

== Austria ==
=== Legal education in Europe ===
He received his first law degree in 1931 from the University of Graz in Austria. His first law degree was in both civil law and canon law, Doctor Juris Utriusque (a "doctor of both laws"). After receiving his law degree, he studied in Grenoble and Paris and visited much of Western Europe.

=== Legal career in Austria ===
He began his law career in the Office of the Procurator General, "which meant that he learned the prosecutorial system in Austria, the penal system, and how the courts and judiciary were organized." He became "the youngest federal judge in Austria" and "the only Jewish judge in the system."

In 1935, Fred F. Herzog had been appointed a judge for life in Austria. But three years later, after the Nazi Anschluss of Austria, Fred Herzog was removed as a judge because he was a Jew. The Anschluss was on March 11, 1938. He received a letter dated March 14, 1938, that told him he was dismissed from his post "because you are a Jew."

== United States ==
=== Escape to the United States ===
Fred escaped from Austria by boarding a train to Sweden.

In April 1940, as the Nazis were invading Norway, he was able to board a ship for New York City. He entered the United States on a program designed to allow legal scholars "to escape persecution in Europe on the premise that they were participating in post-graduate programs at American law schools." He was assigned to study at the University of Iowa College of Law, where he studied U.S. law from 1940 to 1942.

His brother, Robert Herzog, had left for France and became a French national. But in 1943, French collaborators delivered him to the Gestapo, who transported him to his death in Auschwitz.

=== Legal career in the United States ===
After obtaining his American law degree in 1942 from the University of Iowa, Fred Herzog moved to Chicago and began a new career as an editor-in-chief of legal periodicals and as a lawyer.

In 1947, Fred Herzog began a 25-year association with what would become the IIT Chicago-Kent College of Law, first as a professor, then as an Associate Dean, and then as Dean of the law school.

In 1963, he became Special Counsel to the Chicago Metropolitan Sanitary District.

From 1972 to 1976, Fred Herzog served as First Assistant Attorney General of Illinois. In 1972, he argued a pioneering environmental law case before the U.S. Supreme Court.

On January 1, 1976, Fred Herzog became Dean of The John Marshall Law School in Chicago. He served as Dean from 1976 to 1983. Under his leadership, The John Marshall Law School joined the Association of American Law Schools, added to its full-time faculty, upgraded the library facilities and holdings, and acquired a new building that doubled the size of the law school.

In 1983, Dean Herzog retired and accepted the title of Dean Emeritus. But in 1990, he was called back in 1990 to serve again as dean while the school was searching for a permanent dean. He kept an office during his retirement and was regularly seen greeting students in the law school lobby. His last visit to the school was in September 2007 to attend a special program to celebrate his 100th birthday.

== Awards ==
Dean Herzog received numerous awards over his long career, including the Illinois Attorney General's Award for Outstanding Public Service (1976), a Lifetime Achievement Award from the Decalogue Society of Lawyers (1999), and a Lifetime Achievement Award from The John Marshall Law School Alumni Association (in 2007).

== Death ==
Fred F. Herzog died on March 21, 2008, at Swedish Covenant Hospital in Chicago, at the age of 100. He was survived by his sons David and Stephen and four grandchildren.

== Commemorations ==
=== Herzog Moot Court Competition ===
The John Marshall Law School Moot Court Honors Program hosts the Dean Fred F. Herzog Moot Court Competition for students at The John Marshall Law School. This is a two-credit hour course that law students take during their third semester. During the seven weeks of the course, participants attend class with a professor and a student teaching assistant. Each competitor must research and write a Supreme Court appellate brief, and prepare an oral argument to present in competition at the Dirksen Federal Court House in Chicago. Competition rounds are judged by local practitioners, professors, and jurists.

=== Dean Fred F. Herzog Memorial Lecture ===
The John Marshall Law School established the Fred F. Herzog Distinguished Visiting Lecture Series in 1988 to honor Dean Herzog and his many contributions to the development of the law and his outstanding service to legal education. The title of the lecture series was changed to the Dean Fred F. Herzog Memorial Lecture in 2008.

The Herzog Memorial Lecture for 2011-12 was delivered on October 17, 2011, by the Honorable Thomas Buergenthal, former Judge of the International Court of Justice, who spoke on "The Lawmaking Role of International Tribunals." Judge Buergenthal grew up in a Jewish ghetto in Poland and was one of the youngest survivors of the Auschwitz and Sachsenhausen concentration camps.

The Herzog Memorial Lecture for 2012-13 was delivered on April 8, 2013, by Laurel Bellows, President of the American Bar Association. The program that day was co-sponsored by The John Marshall Law School and the Chicago Bar Association. President Bellows spoke the subject of "Human Trafficking."

The 2015 Herzog Memorial Lecture was delivered by Professor Deborah Lipstadt, who spoke on the subject of "The Changing Face of Holocaust Denial in the 21st Century."
