= Julio A. Barberis =

Julio Alberto Barberis (born Buenos Aires, 12 April 1936; died 6 March 2011) was an Argentine jurist and diplomat.

== Education ==
He obtained a law degree from the University of Buenos Aires in 1958 and later studied at the Graduate Institute of International Studies in Geneva where he obtained a diploma in 1964. He finally received a doctorate in law from the Pontifical Catholic University of Argentina in 1978.

== Career ==
In 1976, he began working as general counsel of Argentina's Ministry of Foreign Affairs. He was ambassador of Argentina to the Netherlands from 1978 to 1984.

From 1990 to 1993, and 1995 to 2001, he served as a judge at the Inter-American Court of Human Rights. In 1991 and until 1995, he was a member of the arbitral tribunal formed to resolve the Laguna del Desierto incident.

He was a member of the Permanent Court of Arbitration in The Hague between 1977 and 1997, as well as a judge of the International Administrative Tribunal of the International Labor Organization from 1995 to 2000.

He taught international law at the University of Buenos Aires, the Catholic University of Argentina, and Austral University (Argentina), where he was named emeritus professor.

== Recognition ==
He received a diploma of merit from the Konex Foundation in the Humanities category in 1996.
