= Almonacid-Arellano et al v. Chile =

Chilean international lawsuit of note

Almonacid-Arellano v. Chile was a landmark case decided by the Inter-American Court of Human Rights in 2006. The case concerned the 1973 extrajudicial execution of teacher Luis Alfredo Almonacid Arellano by Chilean security forces during the military dictatorship. The Court found that Chile had violated the American Convention on Human Rights (ACHR) by failing to investigate and prosecute those responsible, and by applying an amnesty law that prevented accountability.

In its judgment, the Court held that national judges are obligated to review domestic laws for conformity with the ACHR. If a conflict exists, the domestic law must not be applied. The decision is widely cited for reinforcing the principle that international human rights obligations take precedence over conflicting national laws, particularly amnesty laws shielding serious human rights violations.

== Judgement ==
The relevant paragraphs stating the primacy of the ACHR is to be upheld by domestic courts (pp. 54–55):

123. The above mentioned legislative obligation established by Article 2 of the Convention [= obligation to annul all legislation which is in violation of the Convention] is also aimed at facilitating the work of the Judiciary so that the law enforcement authority may have a clear option in order to solve a particular case. However, when the Legislative Power fails to set aside and / or adopts laws which are contrary to the American Convention, the Judiciary is bound to honor the obligation to respect rights as stated in Article 1(1) of the said Convention, and consequently, it must refrain from enforcing any laws contrary to such Convention. The observance by State agents or officials of a law which violates the Convention gives rise to the international liability of such State, as contemplated in International Human Rights Law, in the sense that every State is internationally responsible for the acts or omissions of any of its powers or bodies for the violation of internationally protected rights, pursuant to Article 1(1) of the American Convention.
124. The Court is aware that domestic judges and courts are bound to respect the rule of law, and therefore, they are bound to apply the provisions in force within the legal system. But when a State has ratified an international treaty such as the American Convention, its judges, as part of the State, are also bound by such Convention. This forces them to see that all the effects of the provisions embodied in the Convention are not adversely affected by the enforcement of laws which are contrary to its purpose and that have not had any legal effects since their inception.
  In other words, the Judiciary must exercise a sort of "conventionality control" between the domestic legal provisions which are applied to specific cases and the American Convention on Human Rights. To perform this task, the Judiciary has to take into account not only the treaty, but also the interpretation thereof made by the Inter-American Court, which is the ultimate interpreter of the American Convention.
