= Rodrigo Mudrovitsch =

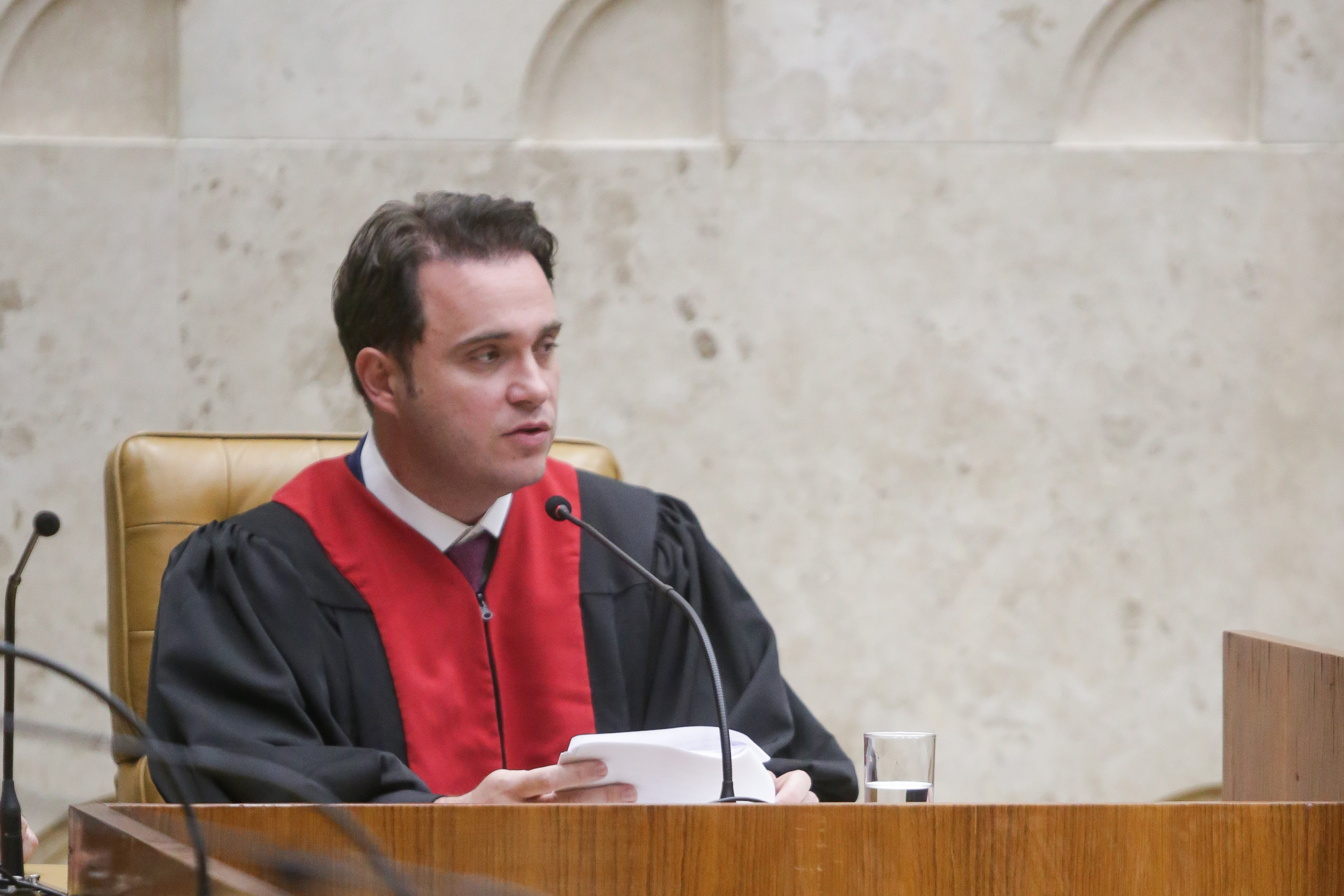
- Rodrigo Mudrovitsch at the Supreme Federal Court of Brazil

Vice President of the Inter-American Court of Human Rights
- In office January 1, 2024 – December 31, 2025

Judge of the Inter-American Court of Human Rights
- In office January 1, 2022 – December 31, 2027

Personal details
- Education: University of Brasília

Rodrigo Mudrovitsch is a Brazilian jurist, professor, and magistrate. Elected one of the seven judges of the Inter-American Court of Human Rights, he serves as Vice President during the 2024–2025 biennium. He was chosen by his peers in November 2025 to serve as President of the Court during the 2026–2027 biennium.

He graduated from the University of Brasília (UnB) and has an academic career focused on constitutional law and public law, with participation in research activities, teaching, and scholarly production in these areas. He also worked as a collaborator in legislative processes and technical debates in the National Congress, contributing to commissions, public hearings, and regulatory projects.

== Career ==
=== Education ===
Rodrigo Mudrovitsch earned his Law degree from the University of Brasília, where he also completed a Master's degree in Constitutional Law. He later obtained a Ph.D. in Constitutional Law from the Department of Public Law at the University of São Paulo (USP).

=== Collaboration with the Legislative Branch ===
He served as Secretary-General of the Committee of Jurists created by the then President of the Chamber of Deputies, responsible for systematizing constitutional procedural norms. He was also a member of the Committee of Jurists established by the Chamber of Deputies to draft a preliminary bill for the reform of the Administrative Improbity Law.

Mudrovitsch was appointed to join the committee of jurists tasked with reviewing and updating the Brazilian Civil Code. Created by the Federal Senate in September 2023, the committee is chaired by Minister Luis Felipe Salomão of the Superior Court of Justice and is composed of 34 members. The committee's work is divided into subject areas, each assigned to different jurists. Rodrigo Mudrovitsch was appointed as the rapporteur for the General Part of the new Civil Code.

=== Inter-American Court of Human Rights ===
==== 2020 ====
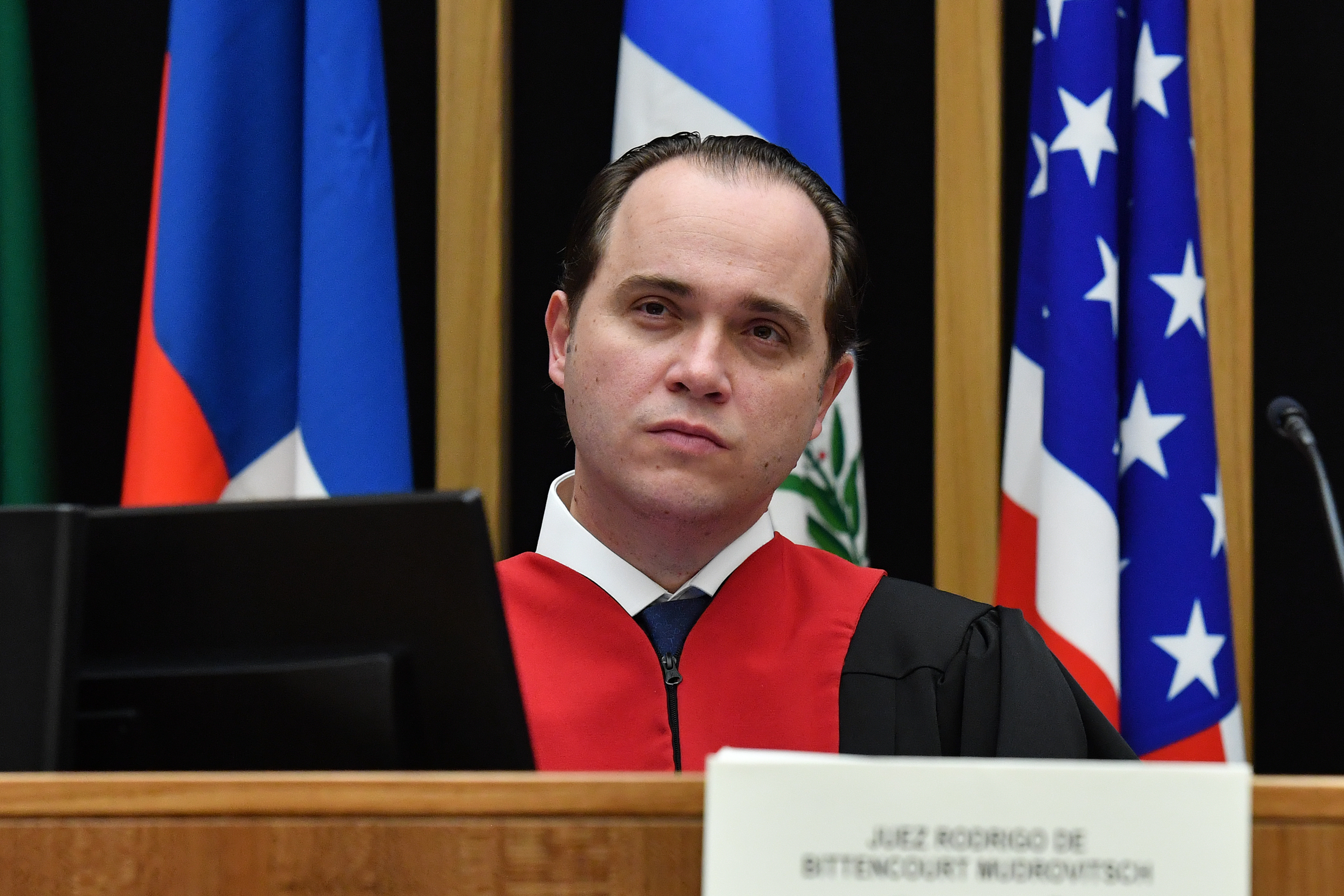
Rodrigo Mudrovitsch at the public hearing of the 150th Regular Session of the Inter-American Court of Human Rights.

In December 2020, Rodrigo Mudrovitsch was nominated to the Inter-American Court of Human Rights (IACtHR). His candidacy received 19 letters of support from Brazilian organizations and authorities, such as the President of the Federal Senate, as well as institutions such as the Brazilian Association of Magistrates (AMB) and the Brazilian Bar Association (OAB).

==== 2021 ====
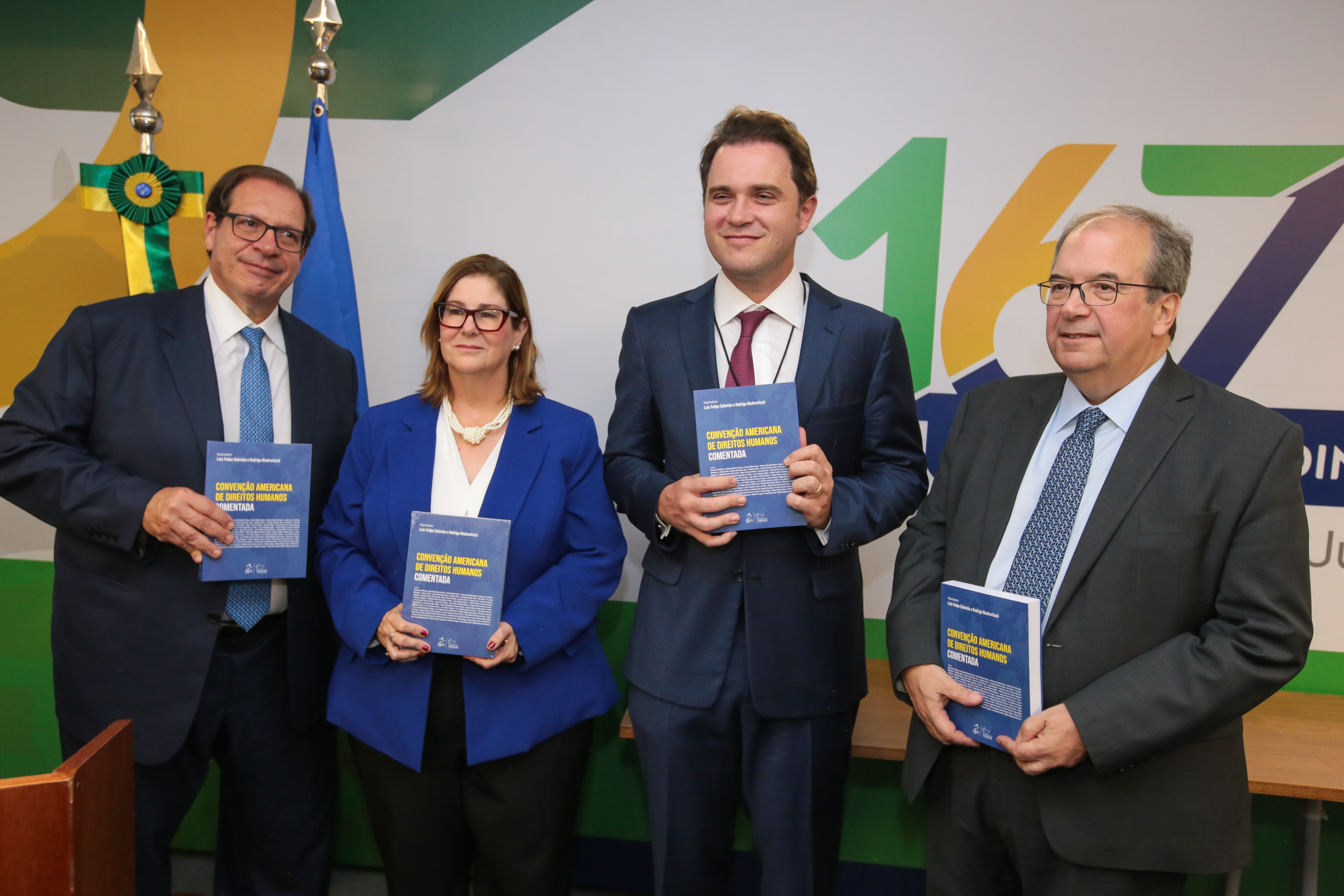
Rodrigo Mudrovitsch during the opening session of the 167th Regular Period of Sessions of the Inter-American Court of Human Rights.

On November 12, 2021, at the age of 36, Rodrigo Mudrovitsch was elected by the General Assembly of the Organization of American States (OAS) to a six-year term on the Inter-American Court of Human Rights. He received 19 favorable votes out of the 24 States Parties to the American Convention on Human Rights. The election was considered the most competitive in the Court’s history, with nine candidates initially in the race—two of whom withdrew during the campaign. Mudrovitsch became the second youngest person ever elected as a judge to the Inter-American Court.

==== 2023 ====
In November 2023, he was elected by his peers as Vice President of the Court. His term, as well as that of the new President, Nancy Hernández, runs from January 1, 2024, to December 2025.

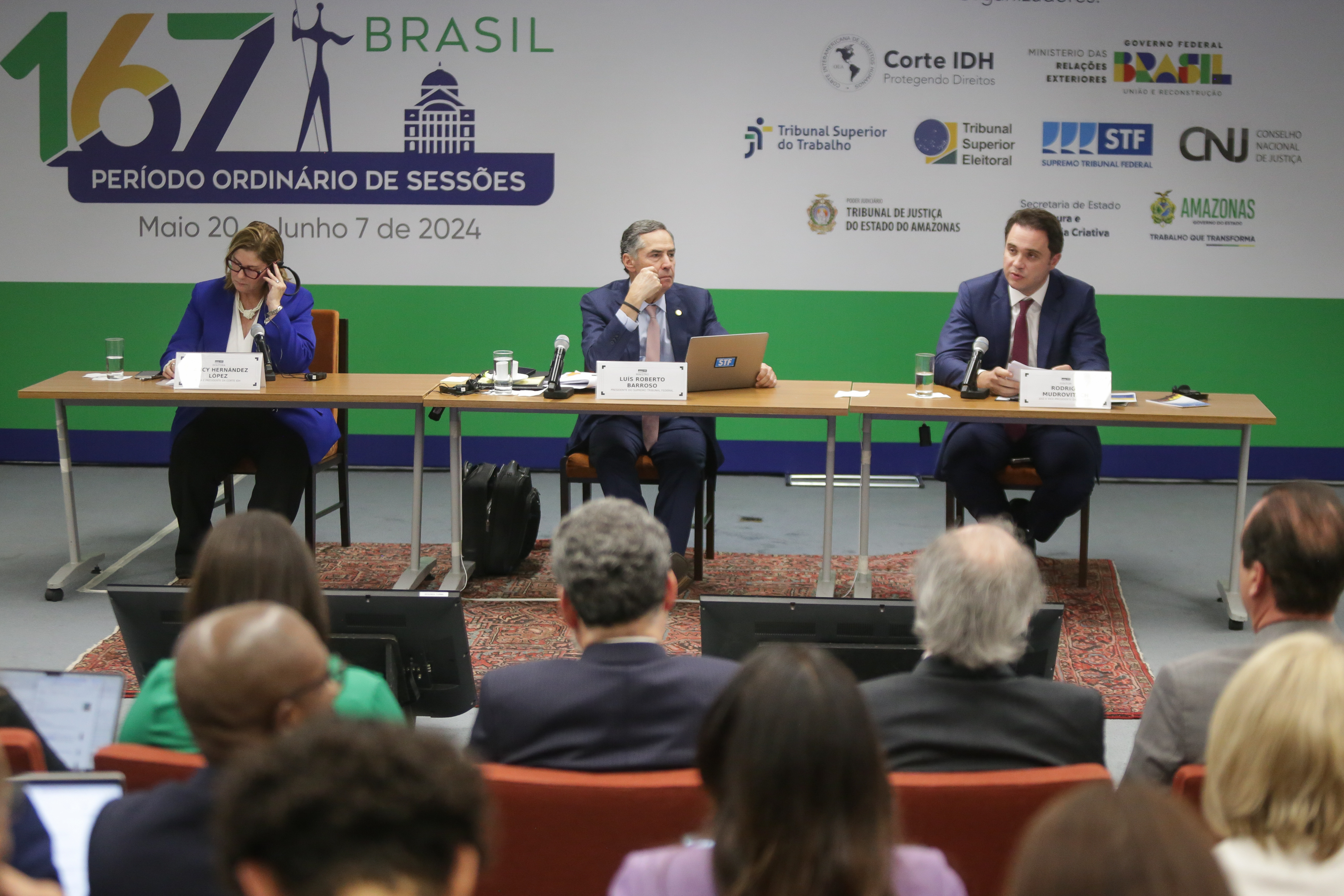
Rodrigo Mudrovitsch during the opening session of the 167th Regular Period of Sessions of the Inter-American Court of Human Rights.

==== Cases ====
Since his appointment, Mudrovitsch has taken part in the adjudication of dozens of cases. In landmark rulings, he has authored concurring and separate opinions, either individually or jointly with other judges, in significant decisions of the Inter-American Court on a wide range of topics, such as:

- The protection of freedom of expression (Moya Chacón v. Costa Rica; Baraona Bray v. Chile; Viteri Ungaretti v. Ecuador),
- Indigenous peoples' rights (Maya Q’eqchi’ Community v. Guatemala; Garifuna San Juan Community v. Honduras; U’wa People v. Colombia; Rama and Kriol Peoples v. Nicaragua)
- The duty to investigate, prosecute, and punish crimes against humanity, including forced disappearance and torture (Vega González v. Chile; Ubaté and Bogotá v. Colombia; Aguas Acosta v. Ecuador)
- Protection of judicial guarantees (Reyes Mantilla v. Ecuador)
- Legality in criminal law (Huilcaman Pailama v. Chile)
- Affirmation of economic, social, cultural, and environmental rights (Guevara Díaz v. Costa Rica; Benites Cabrera v. Peru; SUTECASA v. Peru),
- Environmental protection (La Oroya Community v. Peru),
- Guarantee of judicial independence (Aguinaga Aillón v. Ecuador; Cajahuanca Vásquez v. Peru; Gutiérrez Navas v. Honduras),
- Inviolability of the home (Valencia Campos v. Bolivia),
- Combating violence against women (Angulo Losada v. Bolivia; Carrión González v. Nicaragua),
- Right to informational self-determination and protection of human rights defenders (CAJAR v. Colombia),
- Children's rights (Córdoba v. Paraguay),
- Protection of the rights to equality and non-discrimination with respect to foreigners (Hendrix v. Guatemala),
- Political and electoral rights (Capriles v. Venezuela; Gadea Mantilla v. Nicaragua),
- Right to a life plan (Pérez Lucas v. Guatemala)

== Published works ==
- 2024 – Convenção Americana de Direitos Humanos Comentada (Commentary on the American Convention on Human Rights, Gen/Forense Publishing), co-authored with several contributors, co-edited with Luis Felipe Salomão, ISBN 9788530995003
- 2023 – Lei Anticorrupção em Debate - Balanço de seus 10 Anos (The Anti-Corruption Law in Debate – A 10-Year Review), Biblioteca IDP, Juruá Publishing, co-authored with Giuseppe Giamundo Neto and Roberto Ricomini Piccelli, ISBN 9786526306192
- 2022 – Lei de Improbidade Administrativa Comentada (Commentary on the Administrative Improbity Law), Lumen Juris Publishing, co-authored with Guilherme Pupe Da Nóbrega, ISBN 9788551919088
- 2021 – Comentários À Lei De Improbidade Administrativa E Ao Projeto De Sua Reforma(Comments on the Administrative Improbity Law and the Bill for Its Reform), Lumen Juris Publishing, co-authored with Guilherme Pupe Da Nóbrega, ISBN 9786555107593
- 2020 – Questões Jurídicas Atuais sob Novas Perspectivas (Current Legal Issues from New Perspectives), Lumen Juris Publishing, co-authored with Guilherme Pupe Da Nóbrega, ISBN 9786555100266
- 2018 – Democracia e Governo Representativo no Brasil (Democracy and Representative Government in Brazil), Lumen Juris Publishing, ISBN 9788551909874
- 2017 – Assembleia Nacional Constituinte de 1987-1988: Análise crítica (National Constituent Assembly of 1987–1988: A Critical Analysis), Saraiva Jur Publishing, co-authored with several contributors, co-edited with Gilmar Ferreira Mendes, ISBN 9788547206321
- 2016 – Jurisdição constitucional (Constitutional Jurisdiction), Saraiva Jur Publishing, co-authored with various contributors, compiled by Rodrigo Bittencourt Mudrovitsch, Jorge Octávio Lavocat Galvão, and Gilmar Ferreira Mendes, ISBN 9788547206352
- 2016 – Manual dos Direitos da Pessoa Idosa (Handbook of the Rights of the Elderly), Saraiva Jur Publishing, co-authored with George Salomão Leite, Gilmar Ferreira Mendes, and Glauco Salomão Leite, ISBN 9788547212223
- 2014 – Desentrincheiramento da Jurisdição Constitucional (De-entrenching Constitutional Jurisdiction), Saraiva Jur Publishing, ISBN 9788502230521
