= Pedro Nikken =

Venezuelan lawyer and jurist (1945–2019)

3rd President of the Inter-American Court of Human Rights
- In office 1983–1985
- Preceded by: Carlos Roberto Reina
- Succeeded by: Thomas Buergenthal

Personal details
- Born: 12 June 1945 Caracas, Venezuela
- Died: 9 December 2019 (aged 74) Caracas, Venezuela
- Education: Andrés Bello Catholic University; University of Paris II Panthéon-Assas; University of Carabobo

Pedro Antonio Nikken Bellshaw (12 June 1945 – 9 December 2019) was a Venezuelan lawyer and jurist.

== Background ==
He studied law at the Andrés Bello Catholic University Law School, graduating in 1968. In 1973 he obtained a diploma from higher studies at the University of Paris II Panthéon-Assas and in 1977, a doctorate in law from the University of Carabobo.

== Career ==
He was professor and dean of the Faculty of Juridical and Political Sciences of the Central University of Venezuela.

Between October 1979 and 1989 he was judge of the Inter-American Court of Human Rights, being also its vice president between 1981 and 1983, and president between 1983 and 1985. In 1988 he was vice president of the Inter-American Institute of Human Rights.

In the 1990s, the United Nations appointed him as legal advisor to the mediation that ended the Salvadoran Civil War.

Since 1997 he was a member of the Academy of Political and Social Sciences of Venezuela.

In 2017 he received an honorary doctorate from the University of Buenos Aires.
