= Verónica Gómez (judge) =

Argentine jurist

Judge of the Inter-American Court of Human Rights
- Incumbent
- Assumed office 8 February 2022
- Nominated by: Argentina
- Preceded by: Eugenio Zaffaroni

Personal details
- Education: University of Buenos Aires; University of Nottingham

Verónica Gómez is an Argentine jurist and professor of human rights and international law. She has been judge of the Inter-American Court of Human Rights since 2022.

== Career ==
Gómez got a degree in law from the University of Buenos Aires in 1990 and a master's degree in international law from the University of Nottingham in 1994.

She served as a Senior Specialist at the Inter-American Commission on Human Rights between 1998 and 2009 and as an advisor to the Argentine Ministry of Foreign Affairs between 2010 and 2012. Since 2011, she has been a professor at the National University of San Martín (UNSAM), where she also has been directing its International Center for Political Studies and since 2019, she has served as president of the Global Campus of Human Rights, an international network dedicated to human rights education. Gómez has taught at various universities and in countries around the world, including Nepal, Bosnia and Herzegovina, Australia, Italy, and South Africa, and has served as a scientific supervisor, doctoral thesis evaluator, and member of editorial boards for human rights publications.

In August 2021 she was designated to become the new judge of the Inter-American Court of Human Rights to succeed Eugenio Zaffaroni, who retired. On 12 November 2021 the General Assembly of the Organization of American States formally named her judge of the IACHR after receiving 17 votes of the state members. Early that year she met with President of Argentina Alberto Fernández. She was sworn in on 8 February 2022.
