= Alfredo Moreno Echeverría =

Chilean constituent (born 1982)

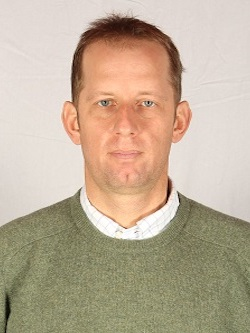

Member of the Constitutional Convention
- In office 4 July 2021 – 4 July 2022
- Constituency: 17th District

Personal details
- Born: 11 February 1982 (age 44) Santiago, Chile
- Parent(s): Alfredo Moreno Charme; Ana María Echeverría
- Occupation: Lawyer

Alfredo Moreno Echeverría (born 11 February 1982) is a Chilean commercial engineer, farmer, and independent politician.

He served as a member of the Constitutional Convention in 2021, representing the 17th District of the Maule Region.

== Early life and family ==
Moreno was born on 11 February 1982 in Santiago, Chile. He is the son of Alfredo Moreno, who served as Minister of Public Works under President Sebastián Piñera, and Ana María Echeverría.

He is married to Marcela Paz Pozo Parot, with whom he has three children.

== Professional career ==
Moreno completed his secondary education at Colegio Apoquindo de Hombres in the commune of Lo Barnechea, Metropolitan Region. He pursued higher education at the Adolfo Ibáñez University, where he earned a degree in commercial engineering and later obtained a master’s degree in private law.

He also holds a bachelor’s degree in humanities and social sciences from the Pontifical Catholic University of Chile.

Moreno works as a farmer and serves as president of the Vive Chile Rural Corporation and of the Federation of Chilean Horse Breeders. Between 2013 and November 2015, he worked as director of the Palmas de Peñaflor Equestrian Squadron. He currently carries out his professional activities at the Peñaflor Nuevo estate in Río Claro, Maule Region.

== Political career ==
In the elections held on 15–16 May 2021, Moreno ran as a candidate for the Constitutional Convention representing the 17th District of the Maule Region as an independent on a seat supported by the Independent Democratic Union, within the Vamos por Chile electoral list.

He obtained 11,343 votes, corresponding to 4.98% of the valid votes cast, and was elected as a member of the Convention.
