= United Nations General Assembly Resolution 66/225 =

United Nations General Assembly Resolution 66/225, adopted on 22 December 2011, reaffirmed the right of the Palestinian people and of the population of the occupied Golan Heights to permanent sovereignty over their natural resources. The resolution demanded Israel to cease the exploitation, damage, depletion, and endangerment of those resources, and recognized the right of the Palestinian people to claim restitution as a result of Israeli violation of their rights.

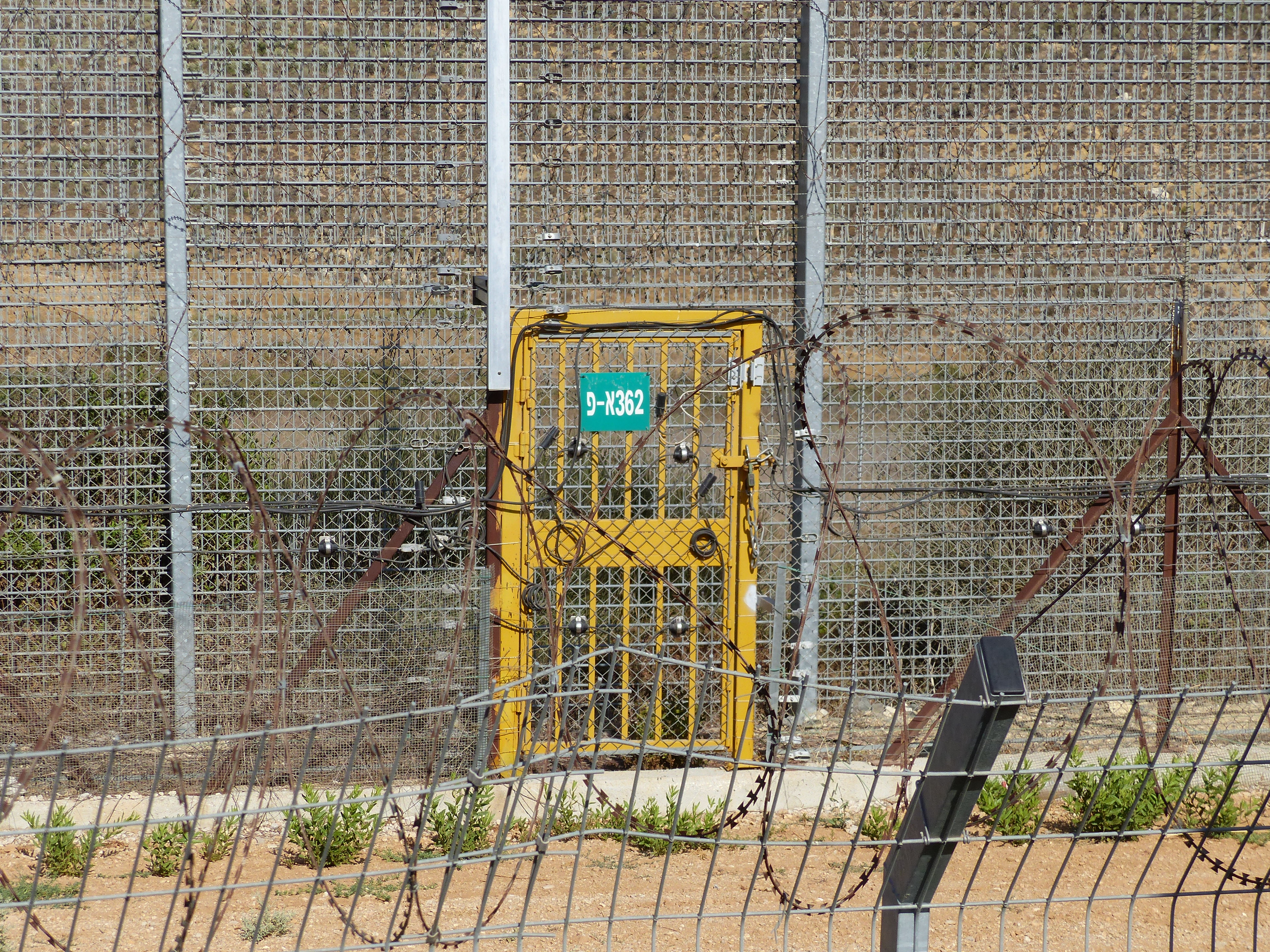
Syrian border fence

The United Nations General Assembly stressed that the wall and Israeli settlements in the Occupied Palestinian Territory, including East Jerusalem, is contrary to international law, in accordance with the 2004 finding by the International Court of Justice and other relevant United Nations resolutions concerning Israel.

The General Assembly also called upon Israel to comply strictly with its obligations under international law and to cease actions that harm the environment, including the dumping of waste materials that gravely threaten natural resources, particularly water and land, and pose an environmental, sanitation and health risks to the civilian populations. Furthermore, it urged Israel to halt the destruction of vital infrastructure, including water pipelines and sewage networks, which, inter alia, negatively affects the natural resources of the Palestinian people.

The resolution's full title is 66/225. Permanent sovereignty of the Palestinian people in the Occupied Palestinian Territory, including East Jerusalem, and of the Arab population in the occupied Syrian Golan over their natural resources.

== Text of the Resolution ==
The General Assembly,

Recalling its resolution 65/179 of 20 December 2010, and taking note of Economic and Social Council resolution 2011/41 of 28 July 2011,

Recalling also its resolutions 58/292 of 6 May 2004 and 59/251 of 22 December 2004,

Reaffirming the principle of the permanent sovereignty of peoples under foreign occupation over their natural resources,

Guided by the principles of the Charter of the United Nations, affirming the inadmissibility of the acquisition of territory by force, and recalling relevant Security Council resolutions, including resolutions 242 (1967) of 22 November 1967, 465 (1980) of 1 March 1980 and 497 (1981) of 17 December 1981,

Recalling its resolution 2625 (XXV) of 24 October 1970,

Reaffirming the applicability of the Geneva Convention relative to the Protection of Civilian Persons in Time of War, of 12 August 1949, to the Occupied Palestinian Territory, including East Jerusalem, and other Arab territories occupied by Israel since 1967,

Recalling, in this regard, the International Covenant on Civil and Political Rights and the International Covenant on Economic, Social and Cultural Rights, and affirming that these human rights instruments must be respected in the Occupied Palestinian Territory, including East Jerusalem, as well as in the occupied Syrian Golan,

Recalling also the advisory opinion rendered on 9 July 2004 by the International Court of Justice on the Legal Consequences of the Construction of a Wall in the Occupied Palestinian Territory, and recalling further its resolutions ES-10/15 of 20 July 2004 and ES-10/17 of 15 December 2006,

Expressing its concern about the exploitation by Israel, the occupying Power, of the natural resources of the Occupied Palestinian Territory, including East Jerusalem, and other Arab territories occupied by Israel since 1967,

Expressing its grave concern about the extensive destruction by Israel, the occupying Power, of agricultural land and orchards in the Occupied Palestinian Territory, including the uprooting of a vast number of fruit-bearing trees and the destruction of farms and greenhouses, and the grave environmental and economic impact in this regard,

Expressing its concern about the widespread destruction caused by Israel, the occupying Power, to vital infrastructure, including water pipelines and sewage networks, in the Occupied Palestinian Territory, in particular in the Gaza Strip in the recent period, which, inter alia, pollutes the environment and negatively affects the water supply and other natural resources of the Palestinian people,

Taking note, in this regard, of the 2009 report by the United Nations Environment Programme regarding the grave environmental situation in the Gaza Strip, and stressing the need for follow-up to the recommendations contained therein,

Aware of the detrimental impact of the Israeli settlements on Palestinian and other Arab natural resources, especially as a result of the confiscation of land and the forced diversion of water resources, and of the dire socioeconomic consequences in this regard,

Aware also of the detrimental impact on Palestinian natural resources being caused by the unlawful construction of the wall by Israel, the occupying Power, in the Occupied Palestinian Territory, including in and around East Jerusalem, and of its grave effect as well on the economic and social conditions of the Palestinian people,

Reaffirming the need for the resumption and accelerated advancement of negotiations within the Middle East peace process, on the basis of Security Council resolutions 242 (1967), 338 (1973) of 22 October 1973, 425 (1978) of 19 March 1978 and 1397 (2002) of 12 March 2002, the principle of land for peace, the Arab Peace Initiative and the Quartet performance-based road map to a permanent two-State solution to the Israeli-Palestinian conflict, as endorsed by the Security Council in its resolution 1515 (2003) of 19 November 2003 and supported by the Council in its resolution 1850 (2008) of 16 December 2008, for the achievement of a final settlement on all tracks,

Noting the Israeli withdrawal from within the Gaza Strip and parts of the northern West Bank and the importance of the dismantlement of settlements therein in the context of the road map, and calling in this regard for respect of the road map obligation upon Israel to freeze settlement activity, including so-called “natural growth”, and to dismantle all settlement outposts erected since March 2001,

Stressing the need for respect and preservation of the territorial unity, contiguity and integrity of all of the Occupied Palestinian Territory, including East Jerusalem,

Recalling the need to end all acts of violence, including acts of terror, provocation, incitement and destruction,

Taking note of the note by the Secretary-General transmitting the report prepared by the Economic and Social Commission for Western Asia on the economic and social repercussions of the Israeli occupation on the living conditions of the Palestinian people in the Occupied Palestinian Territory, including East Jerusalem, and of the Arab population in the occupied Syrian Golan,

1. Reaffirms the inalienable rights of the Palestinian people and of the population of the occupied Syrian Golan over their natural resources, including land, water and energy resources;

2. Demands that Israel, the occupying Power, cease the exploitation, damage, cause of loss or depletion, and endangerment of the natural resources in the Occupied Palestinian Territory, including East Jerusalem, and in the occupied Syrian Golan;

3. Recognizes the right of the Palestinian people to claim restitution as a result of any exploitation, damage, loss or depletion, or endangerment of their natural resources resulting from illegal measures taken by Israel, the occupying Power, in the Occupied Palestinian Territory, including East Jerusalem, and expresses the hope that this issue will be dealt with within the framework of the final status negotiations between the Palestinian and Israeli sides;

4. Stresses that the wall and settlements being constructed by Israel in the Occupied Palestinian Territory, including in and around East Jerusalem, are contrary to international law and are seriously depriving the Palestinian people of their natural resources, and calls in this regard for full compliance with the legal obligations affirmed in the 9 July 2004 advisory opinion of the International Court of Justice and in relevant United Nations resolutions, including General Assembly resolution ES-10/15;

5. Calls upon Israel, the occupying Power, to comply strictly with its obligations under international law, including international humanitarian law, with respect to the alteration of the character and status of the Occupied Palestinian Territory, including East Jerusalem;

6. Also calls upon Israel, the occupying Power, to cease all actions harming the environment, including the dumping of all kinds of waste materials in the Occupied Palestinian Territory, including East Jerusalem, and in the occupied Syrian Golan, which gravely threaten their natural resources, namely water and land resources, and which pose an environmental, sanitation and health threat to the civilian populations;

7. Further calls upon Israel to cease its destruction of vital infrastructure, including water pipelines and sewage networks, which, internally, has a negative impact on the natural resources of the Palestinian people;

8. Requests the Secretary-General to report to the General Assembly at its sixty-seventh session on the implementation of the present resolution, including with regard to the cumulative impact of the exploitation, damage and depletion by Israel of natural resources in the Occupied Palestinian Territory, including East Jerusalem, and in the occupied Syrian Golan, and decides to include in the provisional agenda of its sixty-seventh session the item entitled “Permanent sovereignty of the Palestinian people in the Occupied Palestinian Territory, including East Jerusalem, and of the Arab population in the occupied Syrian Golan over their natural resources”.

== Votes ==
The resolution was adopted with 167 votes in favor, seven opposed, with six abstentions. The seven states that voted against the resolution were Canada, Israel, United States, Marshall Islands, Federated States of Micronesia, Nauru, and Palau.
