= Rafael Nieto Navia =

Colombian diplomat (1938–2024)

Colombia Ambassador to Sweden
- In office 13 March 2009 – 26 May 2011
- President: Álvaro Uribe Vélez; Juan Manuel Santos
- Preceded by: Fernando Alzate Donoso

Colombia Ambassador to Denmark
- In office 15 February 2010 – 26 May 2011
- President: Álvaro Uribe Vélez
- Preceded by: Fernando Alzate Donoso

Colombia Ambassador to Iceland
- In office 9 February 2010 – 26 May 2011
- President: Álvaro Uribe Vélez
- Preceded by: Fernando Alzate Donoso

Colombia Ambassador to Finland
- President: Álvaro Uribe Vélez
- Preceded by: Fernando Alzate Donoso

5th President of the Inter-American Court of Human Rights
- In office 1987–1989
- Preceded by: Thomas Buergenthal
- Succeeded by: Héctor Gros Espiell

Personal details
- Born: 5 February 1938 Bogotá, D.C., Colombia
- Died: 4 December 2024 (aged 86)
- Spouse: María Teresa Loaiza Cubides (1965–2024)
- Children: Rafael Nieto Loaiza; Juan Carlos Nieto Loaiza; Pablo Nieto Loaiza; María Teresa Nieto Loaiza
- Education: Pontifical Xavierian University (PhD, 1962)
- Profession: Lawyer

Rafael Nieto Navia (5 February 1938 – 4 December 2024) was a Colombian jurist and political scientist.

Nieto was President of the Inter-American Court of Human Rights between 1993-1994. Furthermore he served as Judge of the International Criminal Tribunal for the former Yugoslavia and he served as Ambassador of Colombia to Sweden with dual accreditation to Denmark, Finland and Iceland.

== Legal career ==
Nieto served as Judge of the International Criminal Tribunal for the former Yugoslavia for more than five years. Four of them as a member of the Appeals Chamber and the International Criminal Tribunal for Rwanda, and more than one year as a member of the Trial Chambers. He served as Judge of the Inter-American Court of Human Rights for twelve years, and he was President of the same for three and a half years. He also served as Auxiliary Magistrate of the Constitutional Chamber of the Supreme Court of Colombia for four years.

== Ambassadorship ==
On 7 January 2009, Chancellor Jaime Bermúdez Merizalde announced that Nieto had been appointed Ambassador to Sweden by President Álvaro Uribe Vélez, stating that Nieto was a "super internationalist, very well respected, and with a lot of tradition" . Chancellor Bermúdez sworn him in the next month on 10 February as Ambassador Extraordinary and Plenipotentiary of the Republic of Colombia to the Kingdom of Sweden serving concurrently as Non-Resident Ambassador to the Kingdom of Denmark, the Republic of Finland, and the Republic of Iceland. Nieto moved to Stockholm shortly after to take up his office, officially presenting his Letters of Credence to His Majesty Carl XVI Gustaf King of Sweden on 13 May 2009; as Non-Resident Ambassador, he presented his credentials to the President of Iceland Ólafur Ragnar Grímsson on 9 February 2010, and to Her Majesty Margrethe II Queen of Denmark on 15 February 2010.

== Personal life and death ==
Nieto was born on 5 February 1938, in Bogotá, D.C. to Eduardo Nieto Umaña (1904–1946) and Teresa Navia Harker (1904–1991). He married María Teresa Loaiza Cubides on 28 August 1965. They had four children: Rafael, Juan Carlos, Pablo, and María Teresa.

Nieto died on 4 December 2024, at the age of 86.
