= Legal Consequences of the Construction of a Wall in the Occupied Palestinian Territory =

Advisory opinion of the International Court of Justice

- Court: International Court of Justice
- Started: 2004

Keywords
- Israeli–Palestinian conflict; military occupation; public international law

On 09 July 2004, the International Court of Justice (ICJ) issued an Advisory Opinion on the Legal Consequences of the Construction of a Wall in the Occupied Palestinian Territory (commonly known as the Israeli Wall advisory opinion). The ICJ stated that the sections of the barrier route which run inside the West Bank, including East Jerusalem, together with the associated permit regime, violated Israel's obligations under international law.

== Background ==
Israel began building a barrier in September 2000, during the Second Intifada, along its border with the West Bank. The barrier partially follows the Green Line boundary between Israel and the West Bank and partially enters into the Israeli-occupied West Bank. It has been a controversial subject and a cause of heightened tensions in the Israeli–Palestinian conflict. Israel argued that the barrier was necessary to keep out West Bank militants and avert more suicide attacks against its citizens.

== UN General Assembly reference ==
On 08 December 2003, the United Nations General Assembly asked the ICJ to render an advisory opinion on the following question urgently:

"What are the legal consequences arising from the construction of the wall being built by Israel, the occupying Power, in the Occupied Palestinian Territory, including in and around East Jerusalem, as described in the report of the Secretary-General, considering the rules and principles of international law, including the Fourth Geneva Convention of 1949, and relevant Security Council and General Assembly resolutions?"

== Advisory opinion ==
In its non-binding opinion, the Court found that the barrier violates international law and should be torn down. The justices voted 14 to one, with Judge Thomas Buergenthal dissenting. It also opined that Israel owes reparation for the resulting damages by 13 votes to two.

Judge Rosalyn Higgins gave a separate opinion, where, about humanitarian law, it is stated, "obligations thereby imposed are (save for their own qualifying provisions) absolute. That is the bedrock of humanitarian law, and those engaged in conflict have always known that it is the price of our hopes for the future that they must, whatever the provocation, fight "with one hand behind their back" and act in accordance with international law".

The opinion held that Israel does not have an Article 51 right to self-defence in international law for two reasons: first, that the threat emanates from a territory where it is an occupying power, and second, because Article 51 applies against state actors and Palestinian militants are typically categorized as non-state actors. Francesca Albanese agrees with this view, while Marko Milanović finds the ICJ opinion ambiguous on this matter.

=== Jurisdiction ===
Israel argued that the Court should decline to render the opinion as the General Assembly's request improperly bypassed the Security Council and because the question was essentially political rather than legal. The Court rejected this objection, holding that it had jurisdiction under Article 65 of its Statute, and found no "compelling reason" to decline to exercise it.

=== Applicable law ===
The Court held that the Fourth Geneva Convention of 1949 applies de jure to the Occupied Palestinian Territory, rejecting Israel's argument that applicability depended on Jordan having held recognized sovereignty over the West Bank before 1967. It further held that the International Covenant on Civil and Political Rights and International Covenant on Economic, Social and Cultural Rights continue to apply alongside, rather than displaced by, international humanitarian law. The Court also observed that the wall severely impeded Palestinian people's right to self-determination.

=== Self-defence and necessity ===
The Court held Israel could not invoke the right of self-defence under Article 51 of the UN Charter to justify the wall's route. It reasoned that Article 51 relates to armed attack by one state against another, whereas the threat Israel faced originated from occupation. The Court also rejected that the wall was justified by necessity under customary international law, as it was not convinced that the chosen route was the only means of safeguarding Israel's security interests.

== Reception and aftermath ==
The General Assembly formally endorsed the Court's findings on 20 July 2004 in resolution ES-10/15 by 150 votes to 6, with 10 abstentions, demanding that Israel comply with its legal obligations as set out in the opinion and requesting the Secretary-General to establish a register of damage. The opinion was also referred to in United Nations General Assembly Resolution 66/225 of 22 December 2011.

Vote on General Assembly resolution ES-10/15: In favour Against Abstained Not voting

The opinion was invoked in November 2006 by Al-Haq, a Palestinian human rights group, which brought a case in the UK Court of Appeal against the British government to end export licences to Israel to "secure the implementation of the July 2004 [ICJ] Advisory Opinion on Israel's Wall". The case was dismissed in November 2008.

== See also ==
- International Criminal Court investigation in Palestine
- International law and the Arab–Israeli conflict
- South Africa's genocide case against Israel
