= Roberto de Figueiredo Caldas =

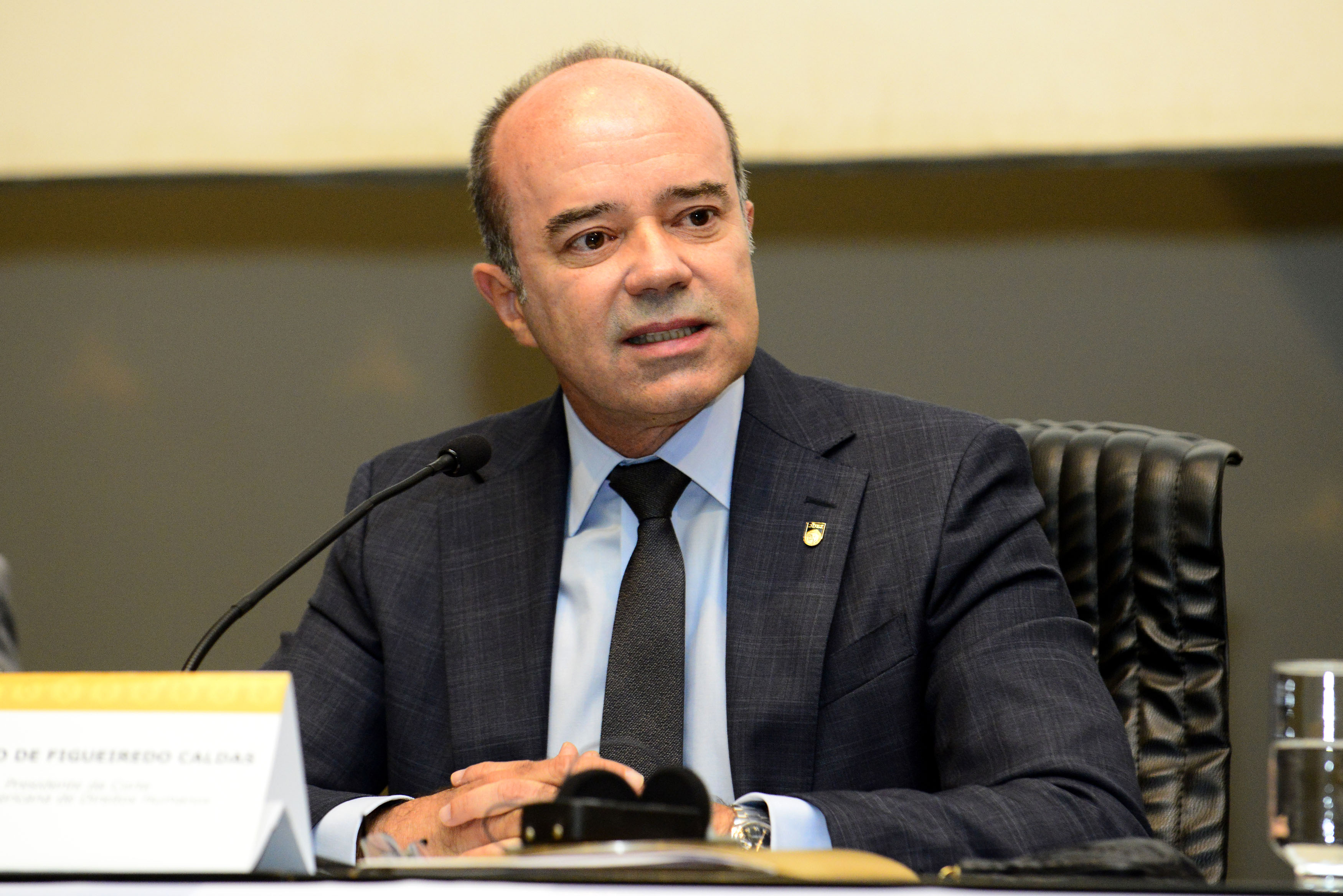
Roberto de Figueiredo Caldas in the seminar "Diálogo between Cortes: the organization of human rights" at the Superior Tribunal de Justiça

Roberto de Figueiredo Caldas (Aracaju - Brazil, born July 29, 1962) is a former judge of the Inter-American Court of Human Rights (mandate from 2013 to 2018). He is also an attorney, partner and chairman of the Board of Alino & Roberto e Advogados.

== Current activities ==
- Attorney, partner and chairman of the Board of Alino & Roberto e Advogados , which solely acts within pro-citizenship causes;
- Argues cases at Brazil's Supreme Court and at Superior Courts of Justice;
- Expert in Ethics, Human and Social Rights, as well as in Constitutional Law and Labor Law;
- Member of the Institute of Brazilian Attorneys, with a seat on the Standing Committee for Labour Rights since 1993;
- Lecturer and regular member of national legal public examination boards, including for Judges and Public Prosecutors.

== Main titles and awards ==
- Bachelor of Law, University of Brasilia (UnB), 1984;
- Doctor honoris causa, São Luís College, Maranhão (2010);
- Doctor honoris causa, Complexo de Ensino Superior de Santa Catarina – CECUSC, School of Social Sciences of Florianópolis (SC, 2010);
- Commander of the Order of Labour Judicial Merit, Brazilian Superior Labour Court (2003);
- Commander of the Dom Bosco Order of Merit, Brazilian Regional Labour Court of the 10th Region (2003);
- Grand Cross Order of Labour Merit of Sergipe, Brazilian Regional Labour Court of the 20th Region (2008).

== Previous activities ==
- Vice President of the Inter-American Court of Human Rights from 2014 to 2015
- Judge of the Inter-American Court of Human Rights (mandate from 2013 to 2018;
- Ad hoc Judge of the Inter-American Court of Human Rights in Brazilian proceedings since 2007:

Escher, Garibaldi, and Gomes Lund or Guerrilha do Araguaia

- Member of the National Legal and Labor Amendment Commission of the Brazilian Ministry of Labor and Employment - MTE (2003 - currently)
- Member of the Public Ethics Commission of the Presidency of the Brazilian Republic Office (2006-2012)
- Councilman of the Council on Public Transparency and Corruption Combat – Office of the Comptroller General of Brazil - CGU / Office of the Presidency of the Brazilian Republic (2007 - 2012). Within the Brazilian Bar Association - OAB, Roberto was councilman of the National Social Rights Commission (2007 - 2010), General Coordinator of the Coordinating Committee on Combating Slave Labour (2010-2013) and of the Subcommittee on Combating Slave Labour of the National Committee on Human Rights (2004 - 2006), Chairman and Co-founder of the Committee on Slave Labour Combat (2002 - 2004) and was a member of the Commission for Legal Education and the Special Commission of the Attorneys Caucus, Brazilian Chamber of Deputies. Served as vice chairman, member, and co-founder of the National Social Rights Commission of the Brazilian Bar Association (1999 - 2004). National Secretary-General of the National Commission for Defense of the Republic and Democracy of the Brazilian National Bar Association (2010 - 2013) and the Brazilian Bar Association’s Representative before the Superior Court of Labour (2002 - 2004). Member of the Joint Commission of the Brazilian Bar Association (OAB) and of the Brazilian Association of Magistrates on the Brazilian Judiciary Amendment, generating a substantial portion of Constitutional Amendment n. 45/2004. Participated on the National Commission on the Elimination of Slave Labour (CONATRAE) of the Secretariat for Human Rights / Office of the Presidency of the Brazilian Republic (2003 - 2007 and 2010 - 2013) and of the Working Group on Labour and Union Amendment of the Economic and Social Development Council / Office of the Presidency of the Republic (2003 - 2004). Vice chairman Federal District of the Brazilian Association of Labour Attorneys – ABRAT (2002 - 2004). Roberto was councilman of the Federal District Brazilian Bar Association Section, in which he was the founder and the very first Chairman of the Commission on Social Rights (2001 - 2003).
