= Jorge Abbott =

Chilean judge (born 1947)

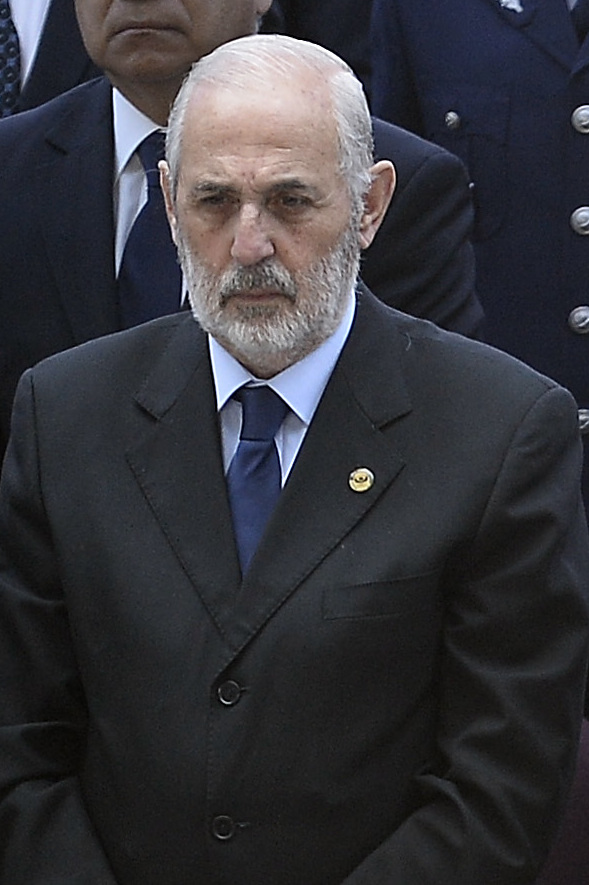

National Prosecutor of Chile
- In office 1 December 2015 – 30 September 2022
- Preceded by: Sabas Chahuán
- Succeeded by: Ángel Valencia

Regional Prosecutor of Valparaíso
- In office 2 January 2003 – 27 December 2010
- Preceded by: Office created
- Succeeded by: Pablo Gómez

Personal details
- Born: 1 October 1947 (age 78) Santiago, Chile
- Party: Christian Democratic Party; Popular Unitary Action Movement
- Relatives: Carlos Alberto Délano; Alfredo Moreno Charme
- Education: Pontifical Catholic University of Valparaíso (LL.B)
- Occupation: Politician
- Profession: Lawyer

Jorge José Winston Abbott Charme (born 1 October 1947) is a Chilean judge.

== Biography ==
=== Family ===
He is the son of Eduardo Abbott Godoy and Luz Charme Montt, a gastronomic businesswoman member of the Montt family who also was leader of the Christian Democratic Party (DC).

His great-great-grandparents were Ambrosio Montt Luco, a deputy of the National Party, and Luz Montt Montt, daughter of Manuel Montt, president of Chile from 1851 and 1861. On his mother's side, he is the cousin of Alfredo Moreno Charme, Chilean businessman, politician and minister in both Sebastián Piñera's governments.

=== Studies ===
He studied at the Pontificia Universidad Católica de Valparaíso Law School and graduated on 31 July 1979. In his student days he was a member of the Christian Democratic Youth and the Popular Unitary Action Movement (MAPU).

== Professional career ==
Abbott served as Deputy Director General of the Valparaíso Region Judicial Assistance Corporation from 1988 to 1990. Then, from 1992 to 2002, he was the General Director of that organ.

In late 2002, Abbott entered the Public Ministry during Ricardo Lagos' government. He was appointed Regional Prosecutor of the Valparaíso, a position he held from 2003 to 2010. From 2011 to 2014, he dedicated himself to the free practice of his legal profession.

In 2014, he was appointed National Executive Director of the Public Ministry by the President Michelle Bachelet. A year later, Bachelet appointed him as National Prosecutor to replace Sabas Chahuán. Abbott took office on 1 December 2015.
