= Banco Penta =

Bank of Chile

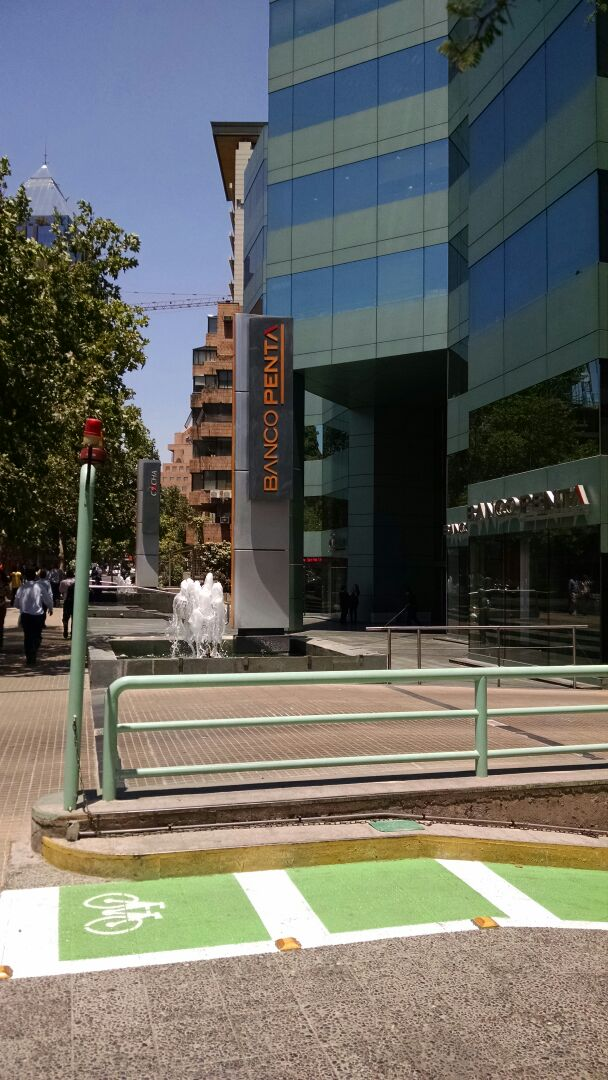

Banco Penta was a bank in Chile. It is headquartered in Santiago, Chile This was founded by millionaires Carlos Alberto Délano Abbott, and Roberto Cordova it was a bank dedicated to finances and investments. this fell due to the 2008 financial crisis, and was sold for $2 million.
