= 2009 Uruguayan referendum =

25 October 2009

Add to article 77 of the Constitution the following numeral: 13º) Uruguayan citizens empowered to vote have the right to vote in elections, plebiscites or referendums, from any country where they reside or are, by letter. In addition to that via, the Electoral Court may implement other procedures, provided that it ensures that the vote is exercised with the same guarantees.
For	37.42%
Against	62.58%

Articles 1, 2, 3 and 4 of Law No. 15848 of December 22, 1986 are annulled and declared non-existent.
For	47.98%
Against	52.02%

A double referendum was held in Uruguay on 25 October 2009 alongside general elections. Voters voted on two proposals: one to abolish the Law on the Expiration of the Punitive Claims of the State, which had granted amnesty for human rights abuses under the 1973–85 dictatorship during the presidencies of Juan María Bordaberry, Alberto Demicheli, Aparicio Méndez, and Gregorio Álvarez, and one to enable overseas postal voting. Both proposals were rejected by voters, with 52% rejecting the revocation of the amnesty law and 62% rejecting overseas postal voting.

== Results ==
Question	For		Against		Total votes	Registered voters	Turnout	Result
Question	Votes	%	Votes	%	Total votes	Registered voters	Turnout	Result
Revoking the Law on the Expiration of the Punitive Claims of the State	1,105,768	47.98	1,198,918	52.02	2,304,686	2,563,250	89.91	Rejected
Overseas postal voting	862,454	37.42	1,442,232	62.28	2,304,686	2,563,250	89.91	Rejected
Source: Direct Democracy
