= Eduardo Vio Grossi =

Chilean lawyer and judge (1944–2022)

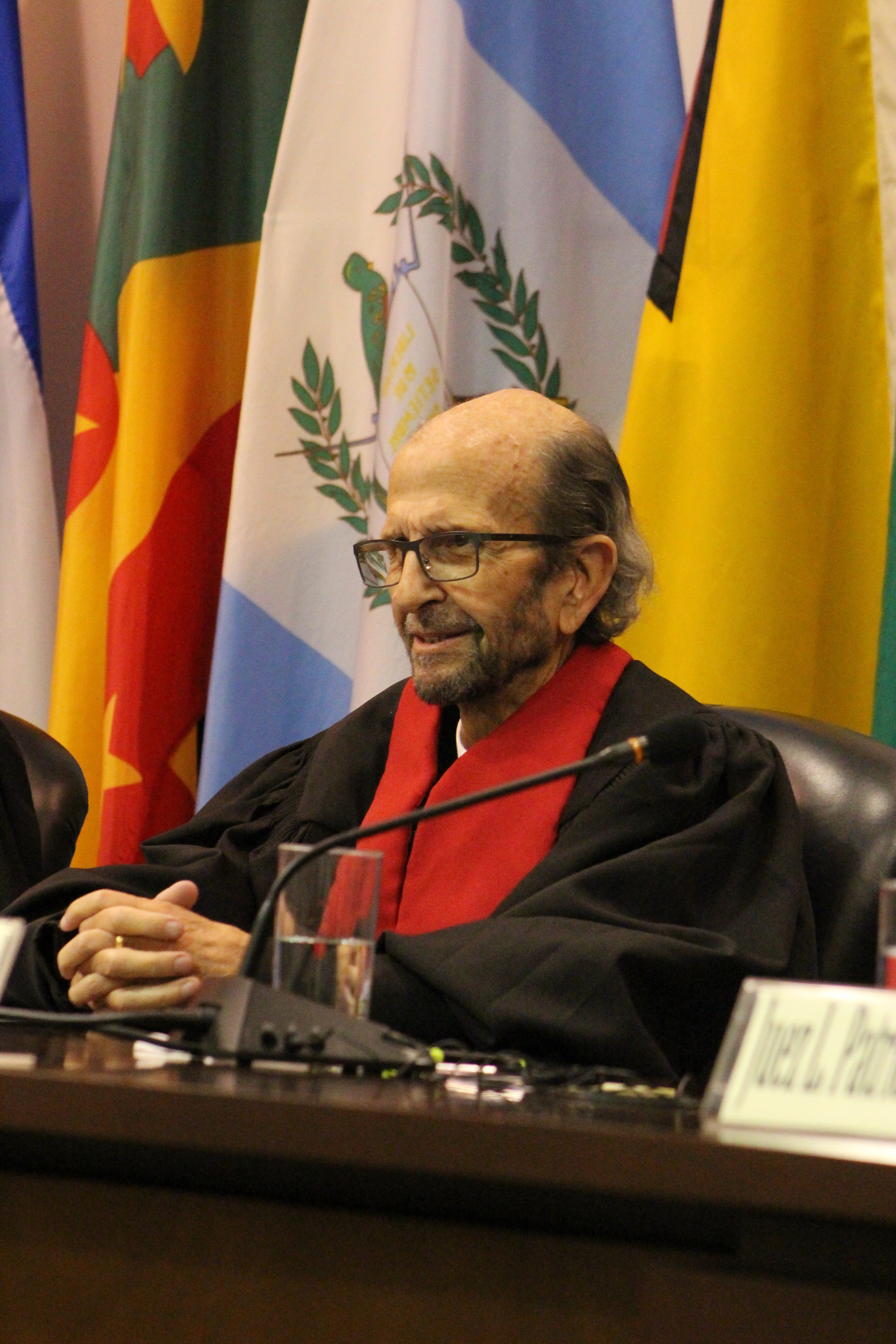
- Vio in 2000

Judge of the Inter-American Court of Human Rights
- In office 1 January 2010 – 31 December 2021

Personal details
- Born: Eduardo Renato Vio Grossi; 17 November 1944; Valparaíso, Chile
- Died: 3 December 2022 (aged 78)
- Education: Pontifical Catholic University of Valparaíso; Pierre Mendès-France University; Colegio de los Sagrados Corazones de Santiago
- Occupation: Lawyer; Judge

Eduardo Renato Vio Grossi (17 November 1944 – 3 December 2022) was a Chilean lawyer and judge. He served on the Inter-American Court of Human Rights from 2010 to 2021.

Vio Grossi died on 3 December 2022, at the age of 78.
