= Law on the Expiration of the Punitive Claims of the State =

The Law on the Expiration of the Punitive Claims of the State (Spanish: Ley de Caducidad de la Pretensión Punitiva del Estado), called in short the Expiry Law (Spanish: Ley de Caducidad) granted an amnesty of sorts to the military who eventually committed crimes against humanity during the civic-military dictatorship of Uruguay. It was implemented as an ad-hoc solution to a political crisis with the background of military resistance to the Uruguayan redemocratization process in course.

This law was proposed by the first government of Julio María Sanguinetti, co-written by legislators of the two main political parties, Colorado and National, supported by the main opposition leader, Wilson Ferreira Aldunate, and heavily opposed by the Broad Front and other political and social organizations. It was passed by the Uruguayan Parliament on 22 December 1986 and published with the number 15848.

This law was extremely controversial in nature, and was kept in force for a long time: in 1989 and 2009, Uruguayans voted in referendums and decided twice to keep the law, which detractors considered as plain impunity. In 2011, Law No. 18,831 was enacted, which reestablished "the crimes committed" until March 1, 1985, and classified them as crimes against humanity. For this reason, the Expiry Law was technically repealed. However, the Supreme Court declared two articles of Law 18,831 unconstitutional.
