= 1989 Uruguayan amnesty referendum =

16 April 1989
- Validity of Articles 1 to 4 of Law 15,848

Results
Choice	Votes	%
Yes	1,082,508	57.53%
No	799,109	42.47%
Valid votes	1,881,617	97.25%
Invalid or blank votes	53,152	2.75%
Total votes	1,934,769	100.00%
Registered voters/turnout	2,203,597	87.8%

A referendum on an amnesty law was held in Uruguay on 16 April 1989. The amnesty had prevented the prosecution of the military and police who had been responsible for murder, torture and disappearances during the civic-military dictatorship between 1973 and 1985. The law was retained with 56% in favour of it.

== Background ==
In 1986, the ruling Colorado Party passed the Law on the Expiration of the Punitive Claims of the State, guaranteeing amnesty for the former military junta by a vote of 59 to 37. In 1988 victims of the dictatorship asked the Supreme Court of Justice to declare the law invalid, but the request was rejected by three votes to two.

In 1987 efforts were made to get enough signatures to force a referendum on the issue. A total of 634,702 signatures were obtained, above the required quorum of 555,701. However, the Electoral Court recognised only 532,718 of the collected signatures. After public protests a further 24,000 signatures were accepted as valid, passing the threshold.

== Results ==
Choice	Votes	%
Retain	1,082,508	55.95
Repeal	799,109	41.30
Invalid/blank votes	53,152	–
Total	1,934,769	100
Registered voters/turnout	2,203,597	87.80
Source: Direct Democracy
