= Ľubochňa =

- Municipality
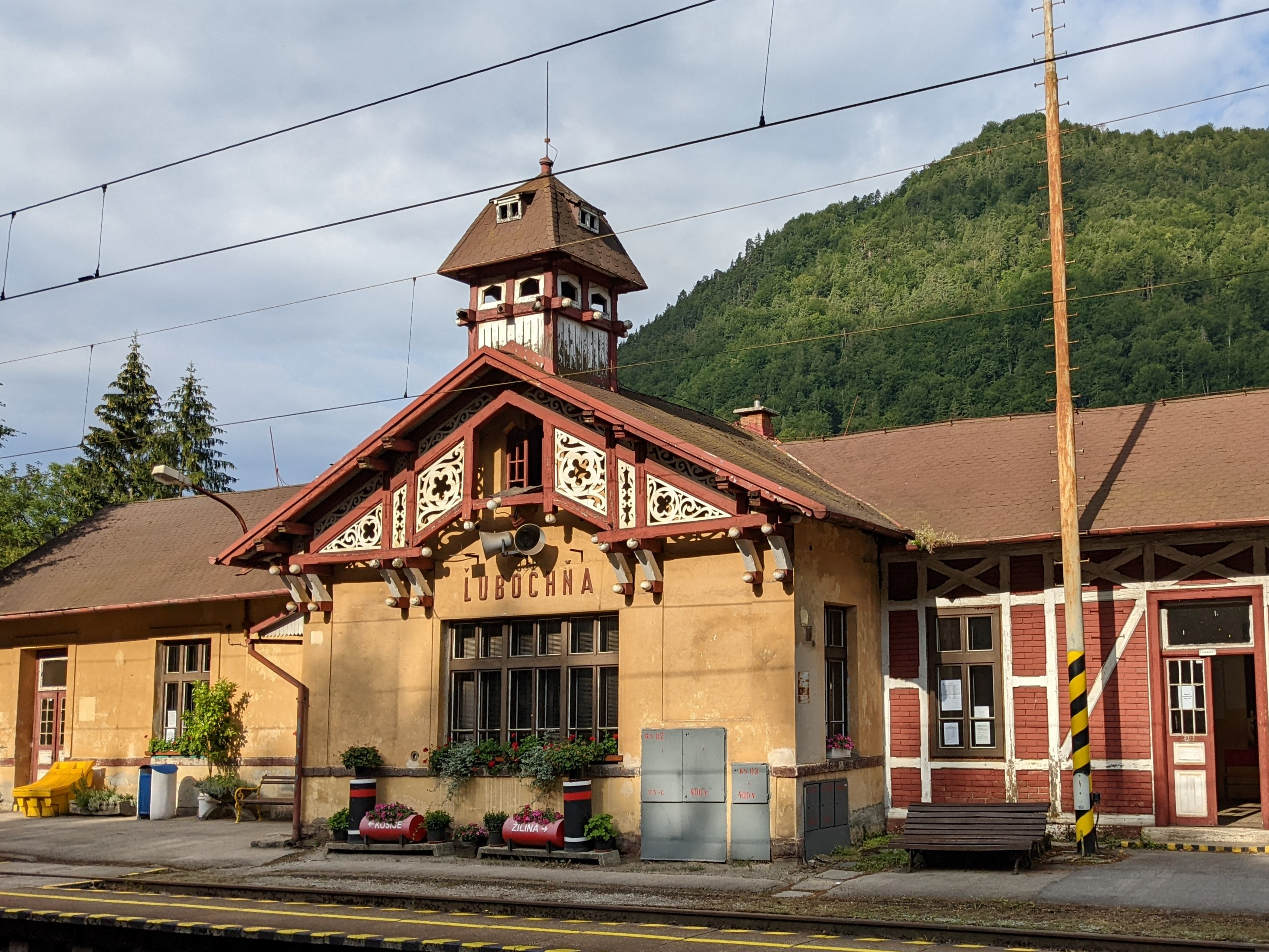

- Flag Coat of arms

- Location of Ľubochňa in the Žilina Region Location of Ľubochňa in Slovakia
- Coordinates: 49.12°N 19.17°E
- Country: Slovakia
- Region: Žilina Region
- District: Ružomberok District
- First mentioned: 1818

Area
  - Total: 113.67 km^{2} (43.89 sq mi)
- Elevation: 451 m (1,480 ft)

Population (2025)
  - Total: 1,051
- Time zone: UTC+1 (CET)
  - Summer (DST): UTC+2 (CEST)
- Postal code: 349 1
- Area code: +421 44
- Vehicle registration plate (until 2022): RK
- Website: www.lubochna.sk

Ľubochňa (Hungarian: Fenyőháza) is a village and municipality in Ružomberok District in the Žilina Region of northern Slovakia.

== History ==
In historical records the village was first mentioned in 1818.

== Geography ==
The municipality lies at an altitude of 451 metres (1,480 ft) and covers an area of 113.67 km^{2} (43.89 sq mi) (2025).

== Population ==
Population statistic (10 years)
Year	1995	2005	2015	2025
Count	1067	1044	1053	1051
Difference		−2.15%	+0.86%	−0.18%

Population statistic
Year	2024	2025
Count	1045	1051
Difference		+0.57%

It has a population of 1051 people (31 December 2025).

=== Ethnicity ===
Census 2021 (1+ %)
Ethnicity	Number	Fraction
Slovak	1054	98.13%
Not found out	14	1.3%
Other	11	1.02%
Total	1074	

In year 2021 was 1074 people by ethnicity 1054 as Slovak, 14 as Not found out, 11 as Other, 9 as Czech, 4 as Rusyn, 4 as Hungarian, 1 as Russian and 1 as Moravian.

Note on population: The difference values of population numbers in the table "Population statistic" and in the sections "Ethnicity" & "Religion" is caused by the use of various statistical methods.

=== Religion ===
Census 2021 (1+ %)
Religion	Number	Fraction
Roman Catholic Church	765	71.23%
None	226	21.04%
Evangelical Church	30	2.79%
Not found out	18	1.68%
Other	11	1.02%
Total	1074	

In year 2021 was 1074 people by religion 765 from Roman Catholic Church, 226 from None, 30 from Evangelical Church, 18 from Not found out, 11 from Other, 10 from Greek Catholic Church, 5 from Eastern Orthodox Church, 3 from Ad hoc movements, 2 from Other and not ascertained christian church, 1 from Jehovah's Witnesses, 1 from Islam, 1 from Hinduism and 1 from Seventh-day Adventist Church.
