= List of people associated with University College London in the Law =

Staff and alumni of University College London who have served in the legal profession are included in this list. For a list of graduates of the UCL Faculty of Laws, see Category:Alumni of the UCL Faculty of Laws.

== Alumni ==
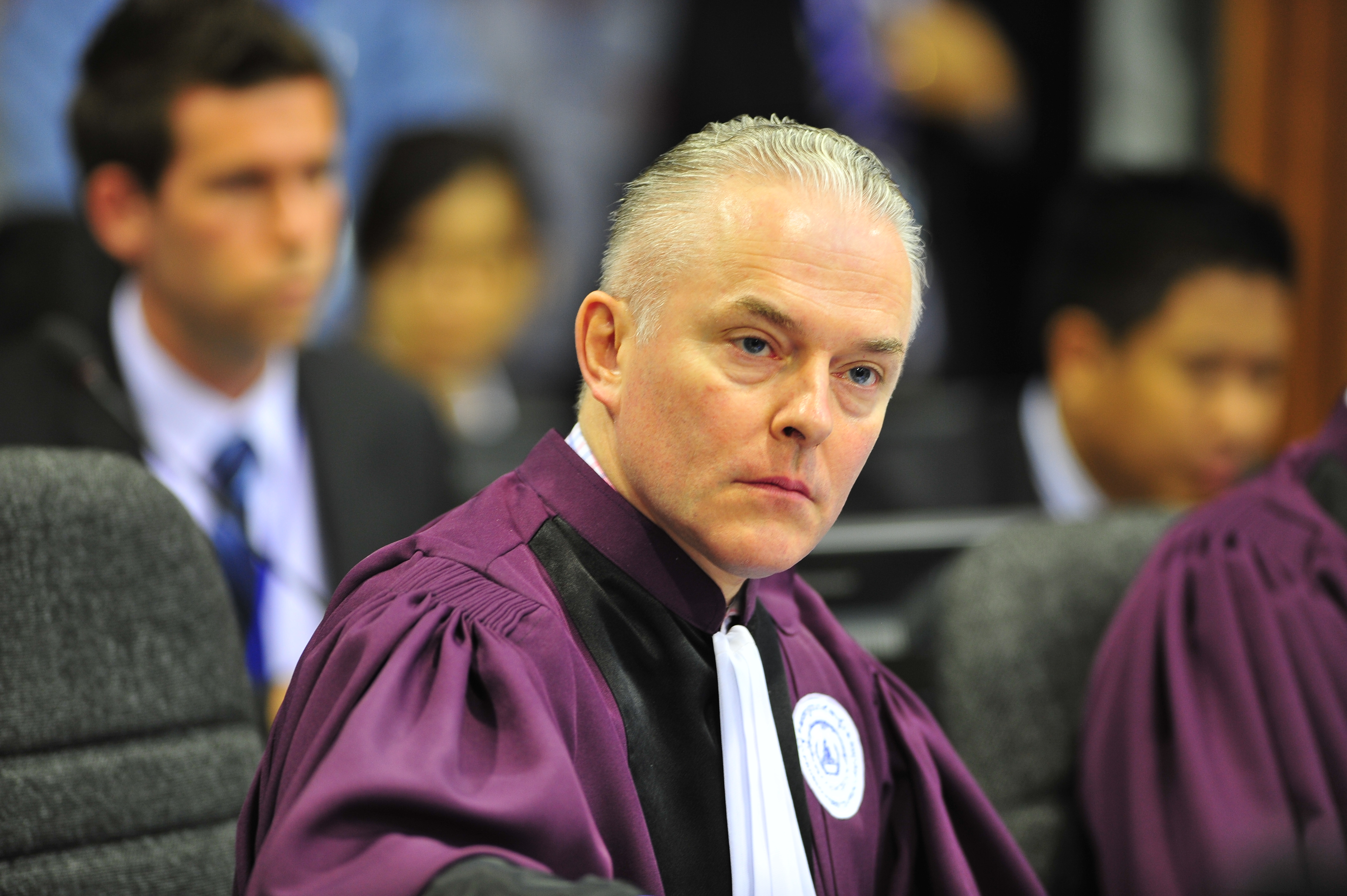
Andrew Cayley, International Co-Prosecutor of the Khmer Rouge Tribunal in Cambodia

=== International ===
- Andrew Cayley (LLM), international co-prosecutor of the Khmer Rouge Tribunal in Cambodia
- Taslim Olawale Elias (BA, LLB, PhD), Chief Justice of the Supreme Court of Nigeria (1972–1975); Judge of the International Court of Justice (1976–1991); President of the International Court of Justice (1982–1985)
- Hassan Bubacar Jallow, prosecutor at the International Criminal Tribunal for Rwanda, Attorney General of the Gambia and Chief Justice of the Gambia)
- Cheng Tien-Hsi (鄭天錫) (LLD), member of the Permanent Court of International Justice

=== Europe ===
- Terry Davis (LLB 1962), former secretary general of the Council of Europe
- Paul J. Mahoney (LLM 1969, Lecturer), current and first president of European Union Civil Service Tribunal
- Christos Rozakis (LLM 1970), first vice-president of the European Court of Human Rights, former Deputy Foreign Minister of Greece

=== UK ===
- John Baker (LLB, PhD), former Downing Professor of the Laws of England, University of Cambridge
- Peter Birks, former Regius Professor of Civil Law, University of Oxford
- Dame Margaret Booth, former High Court judge
- David Childs, former managing partner of Clifford Chance
- Herbert Cozens-Hardy, former Master of the Rolls
- Geoffrey Dear, former Her Majesty's Inspectorate of Constabulary
- Sir Roderick Evans (LLB), former British judge of the High Court of England and Wales and presiding Judge for Wales (2007)
- Peter Goldsmith, former Attorney General for England and Wales
- Arnold Goodman, lawyer and political advisor
- Sir Nicholas John Hannen, Chief Justice of the British Supreme Court for China and Japan (1891–1900)
- Lord Farrer Herschell, Lord Chancellor of Great Britain
- Sir George Jessel (BA, Massachusetts), first Jewish person to be Solicitor General for England and Wales (1871–1873), a regular member of the Privy Council and a judge in UK; Master of the Rolls (1873–1883)
- John Geoffrey Jones (LLB, LLM), judge, Mental Health Review Tribunal president known for his views on legal psychopathy
- Nicola Lacey (LLB), former professor of criminal law and legal theory at the University of Oxford, currently professor of law, gender and social policy at the London School of Economics
- Dame Bernice Lake QC, first Eastern Caribbean woman to be appointed Queen's Counsel
- Sir Gavin Lightman (LLB, Fellow), High Court judge (Chancery Division)
- Lord Nathaniel Lindley, Master of the Rolls
- Sir Vincent Lloyd-Jones, High Court judge
- Andrew Reid (LLB), lawyer, racehorse trainer, and Treasurer of the UK Independence Party
- Leonard Sainer, solicitor and retailer
- Patricia Scotland, former Attorney General for England and Wales and Attorney General for Northern Ireland
- Anthony Scrivener (LLB), barrister famous for defending Tony Martin (2001) and Saddam Hussein (2005) against mass murder charges
- Thomas Edward Scrutton, former Lord Justice of Appeal
- Maurice Watkins (LLB, LLM), director of Manchester United's football board and club's solicitor
- Sir Alfred Wills, High Court judge
- Harry Woolf, Baron Woolf, Master of the Rolls (1996–2000), Lord Chief Justice of England and Wales (2000–2005)

=== Americas ===
- Rudranath Capildeo (BSc, MSc, PhD, lecturer), Trinidad and Tobago barrister at law (attorney-at-law), mathematician, politician, former leader of Democratic Labour Party and leader of the Opposition
- The Rt. Hon. Sir Vincent Floissac, Chief Justice of the Eastern Caribbean Supreme Court
- Dia Forrester, first woman attorney general of Grenada
- Kash Patel (Certificate in International Law), 9th director of the Federal Bureau of Investigation

=== Africa ===
- Samuel Azu Crabbe (LLB), former chief justice of Ghana, president of the National Olympic Committee of Ghana
- Josiah Ofori Boateng (LLB), retired justice of the Supreme Court of Ghana (1999–2001); former electoral commissioner of Ghana (1989–1992)
- Samuel Eson Johnson Ecoma (LLB), former chief judge of Cross River State, Nigeria
- William Bedford Van Lare (LLB), Ghanaian jurist and diplomat, former justice of the Supreme Court of Ghana
- Isaac Wuaku (LLB), retired justice of the Supreme Court of Ghana
- Enock Chibwana (LLB), retired Ombudsman of Malawi.

=== Asia ===
==== China ====
- Nicholas John Hannen, Chief Justice of the British Supreme Court for China

==== Hong Kong ====
- Thomas Chisholm Anstey, Attorney General of Hong Kong, studied at UCL prior to establishment of degree programmes
- Winston Chu, former chairman of Society for Protection of the Harbour, founding Partner at Winston Chu & Company Solicitors
- Joseph Fok, Permanent judge of the Court of Final Appeal of Hong Kong
- Daniel Fung, first ethnic Chinese Solicitor General of Hong Kong (1994–1998)
- William Meigh Goodman, former chief justice of the Supreme Court of Hong Kong
- Simon Li (李福善), (1922–2013) former vice-president of Court of Appeal (Hong Kong) and first ethnic Chinese High Court Judge in Hong Kong
- Jeremy Poon, 5th chief judge of the High Court of Hong Kong
- Winnie Tam, former chairman of the Hong Kong Bar Association (2015–2016)
- Woo Kwok-hing, former vice president of the Court of Appeal of Hong Kong
- Sir Yang Ti-liang, Chief Justice of the Supreme Court of Hong Kong (1988–1996)

==== India ====
- Rabindranath Tagore (dropped out): Indian polymath and the first Nobel Laureate from Asia
- Adarsh Sein Anand: former chief justice of India
- Sudhi Ranjan Das: former chief justice of India
- Kuldip Singh: former Judge, Supreme Court of India (1988–96); Advocate General, Punjab (1987); Additional Solicitor General of India (1987–88)

==== Malaysia ====
- Arifin Zakaria, Chief Justice of Malaysia (2011–2017)

==== Singapore ====
- G. Aubrey Goodman, appointed Chief Justice of the Straits Settlements but died before taking office; extent of studies at UCL unknown but not listed as a University of London graduate
- Thirugnana Sampanthar Sinnathuray, Judge of the High Court of Singapore
- Chao Hick Tin, Attorney general and vice-president of the Court of Appeal of Singapore, former attorney-general of Singapore
- Tan Boon Teik, former attorney-general of Singapore
- Koh Juat Jong (BSc), former acting attorney-general of Singapore, Registrar of the Supreme Court of Singapore, and Solicitor-General of Singapore
- J. B. Jeyaretnam: former registrar of the Supreme Court, former secretary-general of the Workers' Party (Singapore) and founder of the Reform Party (Singapore)
- Belinda Ang: judge of the Appellate Division of the High Court
- Chan Seng Onn, former solicitor-general and High Court judge
- Sylvia Lim, former law lecturer at Temasek Polytechnic, counsel at Peter Low & Choo, and chairperson of the Workers' Party (Singapore)
- Jerrold Yam, lawyer and poet

==== Sri Lanka ====
- Dappula de Livera, Attorney General of Sri Lanka

=== Middle East ===
- Gabriel Bach: former Prosecutor in the trial against Adolf Eichmann, former Justice of Supreme Court of Israel
- Michael Sfard: Israeli Human Rights Lawyer

=== Oceania ===
- John William Salmond: Judge of the High Court of New Zealand

== Staff ==
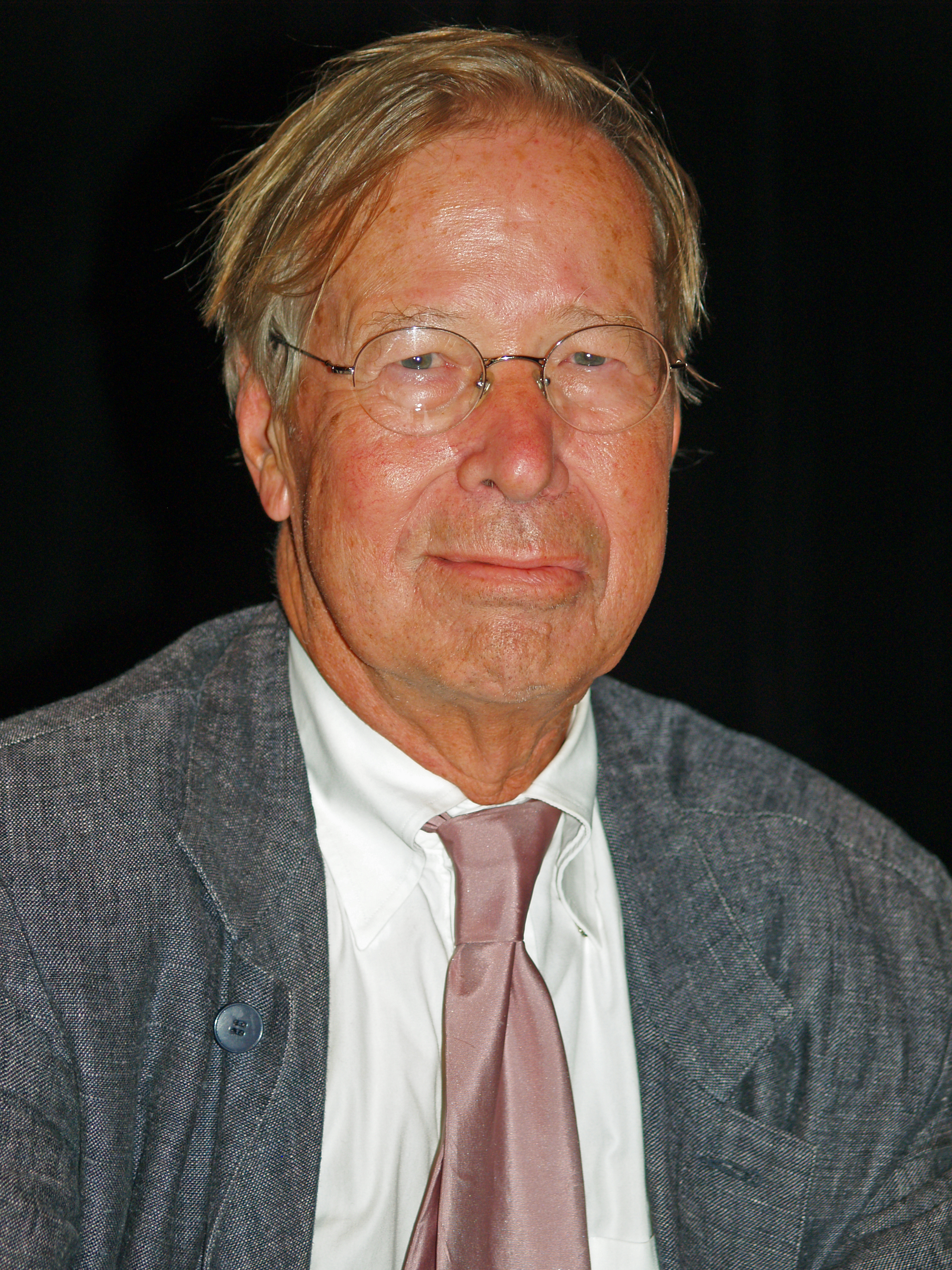
Ronald Dworkin

- John Austin – first professor of jurisprudence at UCL (1829–1834)
- Eric Barendt: Professor of Media Law; co-authored several editions of groundbreaking textbook on UK Social Security Law
- Ian Dennis: Professor of English law
- Ronald Dworkin: Professor of Jurisprudence
- Dame Hazel Genn - Professor of empirical legal studies, former dean of UCL Law faculty
- Sir Malcolm Grant - professor of law and vice-dean (1986–91), subsequently appointed the 9th UCL president and provost (2003–13)
- Stephen Guest - Emeritus professor of legal philosophy, principal research associate
- Sir Robin Jacob - former lord justice of Court of Appeal in England and Wales, now Sir Hugh Laddie Chair and Professor in Intellectual Property Law.
- Anthony Julius - chair in law and the arts
- Sir Hugh Laddie: former professor of intellectual property law; Queen's Counsel; former High Court judge
- Lord Collins of Mapesbury - Professor of law
- Sir Basil Markesinis – Professor of common civil law, Queen's Counsel
- Richard Moorhead - Professor of law and professional ethics
- Philippe Sands: Professor of international law; distinguished human rights practitioner; cases included appearance before International Court of Justice for Gambia regarding alleged genocide in Burma in opposition to Aung San Suu Kyi of that country's National League for Democracy
- Scott Shapiro - Visiting Quain Professor of Law, UCL
- Eleanor V. E. Sharpston, UCL lecturer 1990-92: current advocate general at the Court of Justice of the European Union
- Timothy Swanson: former chair in law & economics
- William Twining - Quain Professor of Jurisprudence Emeritus
- Harry Woolf, Baron Woolf – former judicial posts included Lord Chief Justice of England and Wales; alumnus; and among other roles taught as a UCL visiting professor.
- Brenda Hale, Baroness Hale of Richmond: Honorary Professor of Law
- Paul S Davies: Professor of Commercial Law
- Michael Veale: Associate Professor of Law

== See also ==
- UCL Faculty of Laws
- List of University College London people
