= Legal Consequences arising from the Policies and Practices of Israel in the Occupied Palestinian Territory, including East Jerusalem =

International Court of Justice proceeding

- Court: International Court of Justice
- Full case name: Legal Consequences arising from the Policies and Practices of Israel in the Occupied Palestinian Territory, including East Jerusalem (Request for Advisory Opinion)
- Started: 2023
- Decided: July 19, 2024

Keywords
- Israeli–Palestinian conflict; military occupation; public international law

The Legal Consequences arising from the Policies and Practices of Israel in the Occupied Palestinian Territory, including East Jerusalem (Request for Advisory Opinion) was a proceeding before the International Court of Justice (ICJ), the highest legal body of the United Nations (UN), stemming from a resolution adopted by the United Nations General Assembly (UNGA) in December 2022 requesting the Court to render an advisory opinion relating to the legality of the Israeli occupation of the Palestinian territories.

Israel has occupied the Palestinian territories, which comprise the West Bank (including East Jerusalem) and the Gaza Strip, since 1967, making it the longest military occupation in modern history. In 2004, the ICJ delivered an advisory opinion on the Israeli West Bank barrier, deciding that it contravened international law and should be removed. In January 2023, the ICJ acknowledged the UNGA's request for an advisory opinion on the legal consequences arising from Israel's policies and practices in the occupied Palestinian territories.

Public hearings opened on 19 February 2024 at the ICJ's seat in The Hague, with 52 states and three international organizations presenting legal arguments—the largest number of parties to participate in any single case in the ICJ's history. The court's advisory opinion was delivered on 19 July 2024, holding that the Palestinian territories constitute one political unit and that Israel's occupation since 1967, and the subsequent creation of Israeli settlements and exploitation of natural resources, are illegal under international law. The court also held that Israel should pay full reparations to the Palestinian people for the damage the occupation has caused, and held that its policies violate the International Convention on the Elimination of All Forms of Racial Discrimination.

The Palestinian Authority welcomed the decision as historic, while the Israeli government formally rejected it, stating a political settlement can only be attained through negotiations; Israeli leaders and politicians further decried the opinion as antisemitic. The court's opinion was backed by the European Union but criticized by the United States. On 18 September 2024, the UNGA adopted a resolution calling for the end, within a year, to Israel's "unlawful presence" in the West Bank and Gaza.

== Background ==
A draft motion prepared by the State of Palestine was approved by the Special Political and Decolonization Committee (Fourth Committee) on 11 November 2022. It was passed by a vote of 98 to 17, with 52 abstentions, and was sent to the General Assembly. Nicaragua presented the draft resolution because Palestine is not a full member of the UN.

On 30 December 2022, the UN General Assembly adopted resolution A/RES/77/247 with 87 votes in favor, 26 against, and 53 abstentions.

On 20 January 2023, the ICJ confirmed "The request was transferred to the ICJ through a letter sent by the Secretary-General of the United Nations, Antonio Guterres, on January 17, and the request was registered yesterday, Thursday."

== UNGA resolution ==
Paragraph 18 of the resolution requests the Court to render an advisory opinion on the following questions:

(a) What are the legal consequences arising from the ongoing violation by Israel of the right of the Palestinian people to self-determination, from its prolonged occupation, settlement and annexation of the Palestinian territory occupied since 1967, including measures aimed at altering the demographic composition, character and status of the Holy City of Jerusalem, and from its adoption of related discriminatory legislation and measures?

(b) How do the policies and practices of Israel referred to in paragraph 18 (a) above affect the legal status of the occupation, and what are the legal consequences that arise for all States and the United Nations from this status?

== UN's Special Political and Decolonization Committee vote ==
UN's Special Political and Decolonization Committee vote Approve Against Abstain Absent

Vote	Quantity	States
Approve	98	Afghanistan, Algeria, Angola, Antigua and Barbuda, Argentina, Armenia, Azerbaijan, Bahamas, Bahrain, Bangladesh, Barbados, Belgium, Belize, Benin, Botswana, Brazil, Brunei Darussalam, Cabo Verde, Cambodia, Chad, Chile, People's Republic of China, Comoros, Cuba, Democratic People's Republic of Korea, Djibouti, Dominican Republic, Egypt, El Salvador, Gabon, Gambia, Guinea, Guinea-Bissau, Guyana, Indonesia, Islamic Republic of Iran, Iraq, Ireland, Jordan, Kazakhstan, Kenya, Kuwait, Kyrgyzstan, Lao People's Democratic Republic, Lebanon, Lesotho, Libya, Luxembourg, Malaysia, Maldives, Mali, Malta, Mauritania, Mauritius, Mexico, Mongolia, Morocco, Mozambique, Namibia, Nicaragua, Niger, Nigeria, Oman, Pakistan, Panama, Paraguay, Peru, Poland, Portugal, Qatar, Russian Federation, Saint Kitts and Nevis, Saint Lucia, Saint Vincent and the Grenadines, Saudi Arabia, Senegal, Sierra Leone, Singapore, Slovenia, Somalia, South Africa, Sri Lanka, Sudan, Suriname, Syrian Arab Republic, Tajikistan, Timor-Leste, Trinidad and Tobago, Tunisia, Turkmenistan, Türkiye, Uganda, Ukraine, United Arab Emirates, Uzbekistan, Viet Nam, Yemen, Zimbabwe
Against	17	Australia, Austria, Canada, Czech Republic, Estonia, Germany, Guatemala, Hungary, Israel, Italy, Liberia, Lithuania, Marshall Islands, Federated States of Micronesia, Nauru, Palau, United States
Abstain	52	Albania, Andorra, Belarus, Bosnia and Herzegovina, Bulgaria, Burundi, Cameroon, Colombia, Costa Rica, Côte d'Ivoire, Croatia, Cyprus, Denmark, Ecuador, Eritrea, Ethiopia, Finland, France, Georgia, Ghana, Greece, Haiti, Honduras, Iceland, India, Japan, Latvia, Liechtenstein, Monaco, Montenegro, Myanmar, Netherlands, New Zealand, North Macedonia, Norway, Philippines, Republic of Korea, Republic of Moldova, Romania, Rwanda, San Marino, Serbia, Slovakia, Solomon Islands, South Sudan, Spain, Sweden, Switzerland, Thailand, Togo, United Kingdom, Uruguay
Absent	26	Bhutan, Bolivia, Burkina Faso, Central African Republic, Congo, Democratic Republic of the Congo, Dominica, Equatorial Guinea, Eswatini, Fiji, Grenada, Jamaica, Kiribati, Madagascar, Malawi, Nepal, Papua New Guinea, Samoa, São Tomé and Príncipe, Seychelles, Tonga, Tuvalu, United Republic of Tanzania, Vanuatu, Venezuela, Zambia
Total	193	

== General Assembly vote ==
General Assembly vote Approve Against Abstain Absent

Vote	Quantity	States
Approve	87	Algeria, Angola, Argentina, Armenia, Azerbaijan, Bahamas, Bahrain, Bangladesh, Barbados, Belgium, Belize, Bolivia, Botswana, Brunei Darussalam, Cambodia, Chile, People's Republic of China, Colombia, Cuba, Democratic People's Republic of Korea, Djibouti, Egypt, El Salvador, Gabon, Grenada, Guinea, Guinea-Bissau, Guyana, Indonesia, Islamic Republic of Iran, Iraq, Ireland, Jamaica, Jordan, Kazakhstan, Kuwait, Kyrgyzstan, Lao People's Democratic Republic, Lebanon, Lesotho, Libya, Luxembourg, Malaysia, Maldives, Mali, Malta, Mauritania, Mauritius, Mexico, Mongolia, Morocco, Mozambique, Namibia, Nicaragua, Nigeria, Oman, Pakistan, Paraguay, Peru, Poland, Portugal, Qatar, Russian Federation, Saint Kitts and Nevis, Saint Lucia, Saint Vincent and the Grenadines, Saudi Arabia, Senegal, Sierra Leone, Singapore, Slovenia, Somalia, South Africa, Sri Lanka, Sudan, Syrian Arab Republic, Tajikistan, Trinidad and Tobago, Tunisia, Turkey, Turkmenistan, Uganda, United Arab Emirates, Viet Nam, Yemen, Zambia, Zimbabwe
Against	26	Albania, Australia, Austria, Canada, Costa Rica, Croatia, Czech Republic, Democratic Republic of the Congo, Estonia, Germany, Guatemala, Hungary, Israel, Italy, Kenya, Liberia, Lithuania, Marshall Islands, Federated States of Micronesia, Nauru, Palau, Papua New Guinea, Romania, Togo, United Kingdom, United States
Abstain	53	Andorra, Belarus, Bosnia and Herzegovina, Brazil, Bulgaria, Burundi, Cameroon, Côte d'Ivoire, Cyprus, Denmark, Dominican Republic, Ecuador, Eritrea, Ethiopia, Fiji, Finland, France, Georgia, Ghana, Greece, Haiti, Honduras, Iceland, India, Japan, Kiribati, Latvia, Liechtenstein, Malawi, Monaco, Montenegro, Myanmar, Netherlands, New Zealand, Norway, Panama, Philippines, Republic of Korea, Republic of Moldova, Rwanda, Samoa, San Marino, Serbia, Slovakia, Solomon Islands, South Sudan, Spain, Sweden, Switzerland, Thailand, Tanzania, Uruguay, Vanuatu
Absent	27	Afghanistan, Antigua and Barbuda, Benin, Bhutan, Burkina Faso, Cabo Verde, Central African Republic, Chad, Comoros, Congo, Dominica, Equatorial Guinea, Eswatini, Gambia, Madagascar, Nepal, Niger, North Macedonia, São Tomé and Príncipe, Seychelles, Suriname, Timor-Leste, Tonga, Tuvalu, Ukraine, Uzbekistan, Venezuela
Total	193	

== Reactions to the UNGA resolution ==
Riyad al-Maliki, Minister of Foreign Affairs and Expatriates of the State of Palestine, hailed the resolution as "a diplomatic and legal success and achievement". Al-Maliki expressed gratitude to the nations that supported the resolution by sponsoring it and voting in favor of it. He urged countries that did not support the resolution to "adhere to international law and avoid standing on the wrong side of history." Days prior to the final vote, in an attempt to impede the referral of the conflict to The Hague, then-Israeli Prime Minister Yair Lapid wrote to 50 countries urging them not to support it in the General Assembly.

The Organization of Islamic Cooperation (OIC) welcomed the resolution's approval by the General Assembly, "praising the positions of the countries that supported it, which confirms their commitment to international law and is consistent with their historical support for the Palestinian cause".

== Submissions to the Court ==
The court fixed 25 July 2023 as the deadline for presentation of written statements and 25 October 2023 as the deadline for written comments on the statements made by other States or organizations.

On 7 August the Court announced that 57 written statements had been filed in the Court's registry, including three from international organizations—League of Arab States, Organisation of Islamic Cooperation, and African Union—with the remainder from Palestine and UN member states. According to Le Monde, 57 written submissions is a record (more than have been received on any other case) since the Court's creation in 1945, which the newspaper regards as already a small victory for the Palestinians.

The written statements will not be published by the Court until the start of public hearings, but according to Le Monde, a large majority of the 57 submissions recognize the jurisdiction of the Court to render an opinion on the issues raised; only around 10 or so submissions contest the referral to the Court.

On 14 November, the court announced that 15 comments on the written statements were accepted by the Court.

=== Canada ===
On 14 July 2023, the Government of Canada argued that the Court should exercise its discretion to decline to render an advisory opinion, because Israel has not accepted the jurisdiction of the Court in this matter, and the UN Security Council has established a framework for the parties to resolve the dispute through negotiations.

=== France ===
Although France abstained in the General Assembly on the resolution which requested the advisory opinion from the Court, France submitted a statement to the Court of around 20 pages, in which it reaffirmed the illegal nature of colonization, recounts the legal obligations of the occupier in the occupied territories, including East Jerusalem, and notes the risk of an annexation by fait accompli.

=== Israel ===
The Government of Israel reportedly made submissions to the Court arguing that the Court lacks the authority to adjudicate the Israeli–Palestinian conflict, and that it should instead be resolved by direct negotiations between Israel and Palestinian Authority.

=== Palestine ===
On 24 July 2023, during a meeting at the Hague, Palestine Minister of Foreign Affairs and Expatriates, Riyad Al-Malki, delivered the Palestinian submission.

=== United Kingdom ===
The UK submission opposed the hearing of the case in the ICJ.

== Oral presentations ==
Oral presentation of the arguments started on 19 February 2024. On that date, the Palestinian delegation presented its arguments. The following countries presented oral arguments in the case:

=== Africa ===
- African Union: The AU representative, professor Mohamed Helal, stated, "The injustice being wrought against the people of Gaza makes it imperative to end Israel's impunity and hold it accountable for the rule of law".
- Libya: The Libyan representative stated Palestinians have the right to self determination.
- Namibia: Namibian Justice Minister Yvonne Dausab stated, "Palestinians and Namibians suffered the loss of human dignity … and the outright theft of their land and natural resources … we cannot look the other way in the face of the brutal atrocities committed against the Palestinian people".
- South Africa: South Africa argued that Israel's occupation amounted to colonial apartheid, that the settlements need to be dismantled, and reparations need to be paid to Palestinians.
- Sudan: The Sudanese representative urged the court to issue an advisory opinion for Israelis and Palestinians to "redouble their efforts to achieve peace and security".

=== Americas ===
- Belize: The Belize representative argued Gaza is still occupied despite Israel's 2005 withdrawal.
- Bolivia: The representative from Bolivia argued that Israel's occupation policies and practices violated international law.
- Brazil: The Brazilian attorney advocated for a two-state solution and argued Israel's occupation was a violation of international law.
- Chile: The Chilean representative stated, "By virtue of its actions, including the exploitation of natural resources, the policies of settlements, the erection of the wall, the legalisation of outposts, among others, Israel has demonstrated its intention to control indefinitely the occupied Palestinian territory".
- United States: The occupation must continue for Israel's self defense.

=== Asia ===
- Bangladesh: Bangladesh argued Israel must withdraw its forces in the occupied territories and dismantle all settler structures.
- China: The Chinese representative argued that as an occupied people, Palestinians have a right to resistance.
- Indonesia: Indonesian Foreign Minister Retno Marsudi stated, "Israel's unlawful occupation and its atrocities must stop and should not be normalised or recognised. It is clear that Israel has zero intention to abide by international legal obligations."
- Japan: The legal advisor to Japan's Foreign Ministry stated a "two-state solution where Israel and the future independent Palestinian state live side by side in peace and dignity remains the only viable path for both peoples".
- Pakistan: The Minister for Law and Justice Ahmed Irfan Aslam stated that Israel's occupation was reversible, citing France's withdrawal of 1 million settlers from Algeria in 1962.

=== Europe ===
- Ireland: The Irish representative stated, "By its prolonged occupation of Palestinian territory, and the settlement activities it has conducted there for more than half a century, Israel has committed serious breaches of a number of peremptory norms of general international law."
- Belgium: The legal expert representing Belgium stated Israel's occupation sought a permanent demographic alteration and violates the fundamental rules of international law.
- Luxembourg: The lawyer representing Luxembourg argued that Israel's "activities of colonisation cannot be justified under self-defence" and suggested that its actions had violated the Fourth Geneva Convention.
- Netherlands: Netherlands representative René JM Lefeber argued that people under occupation have a right to self-determination.
- Norway: Norwegian foreign minister Espen Barth Eide stated "the injustice to which the Palestinians are subjected must stop" and argued a two-state solution was "the only solution to the conflict between Israel and Palestine".
- Russia: The Russian representative stated Israel needed to "stop all settlement activities in the occupied territory".
- Slovenia: Slovenia argued that Palestinians have the "fundamental human right" to self-determination and that the Israeli occupation was an impediment to it.
- Switzerland: The Swiss representative stated Israel's occupation "cannot be justified under security requirements because it affects the well-being of the population and is discriminatory in nature".
- United Kingdom: The British representative acknowledged that the Israeli occupation was illegal but argued the court should not issue an opinion on it.

=== Middle East ===
- Arab League: Representing the Arab League, Ralph Wilde stated there was no "backdoor legal basis" for Israel to maintain the occupation; he ended by quoting the Palestinian poet Refaat Alareer's poem If I Must Die, stating, "If I must die, you must live to tell my story. If I must die, let it bring hope. Let it be a story."
- Iran: Iran stated that it was a "collective legal and moral responsibility" to end the occupation and "we should not leave [Palestinians] alone and let them down".
- Iraq: The Iraqi representative stated Iraq is "deeply concerned about the humanitarian suffering inflicted on the Palestinians throughout the state of Palestine".
- Jordan: Michael Wood, representing Jordan, stated, "the only way for the [Palestinian] right to self-determination to be exercised is for the [Israeli] occupation to come to an end". Ayman Safadi further stated, "The occupation is unlawful, it is inhumane, it must end, yet Israel has been systematically consolidating the occupation".
- Kuwait: The Kuwaiti representative stated, "The occupying power has waged an illegitimate war on the Palestinians in Gaza characterised by numerous international law violations."
- Lebanon: The Lebanese representative stated, "Since 1967, Israel has been committing a crime of aggression, illegally occupying territories before annexing them."
- Oman: The Omani representative stated Palestinians "have been living under occupation, oppression, injustice and daily humiliation, while the international community failed to assist them in realising their aspirations to an independent state".
- Qatar: The Qatari lawyer stated that the ICJ holds a "clear mandate and indeed the responsibility to remedy to this unacceptable situation. The credibility of the international legal order depends on your opinion and the stakes cannot be higher."
- Saudi Arabia: Saudi envoy Ziad al-Atiyah stated that Israel has committed "egregious violations of its fundamental international obligations" toward Palestinians under occupation.

== Opinion ==
The ICJ delivered its opinion on 19 July 2024.

=== Jurisdiction and discretion ===
The ICJ is the principal judicial organ of the United Nations. Article 96(1) of the Charter of the United Nations authorizes the General Assembly to request an advisory opinion from the ICJ on any legal question, and Article 65(1) of the Statute of the International Court of Justice authorizes the Court to give one. The Court found that the questions submitted by the General Assembly were legal questions and that it had jurisdiction. It declined to treat Israel's lack of consent as a reason not to give the opinion, finding that the request did not concern only a bilateral dispute and addressed a matter of particular concern to the United Nations.

The Court separately considered whether it should exercise its discretion to decline to give the opinion. It found no compelling reason to do so, rejecting objections concerning Israel's lack of consent, the existing negotiation framework, the framing of the questions, and the adequacy of the factual record.

=== Principal conclusions ===
By a majority of eleven to four, the Court found that Israel's continued presence in the occupied Palestinian territory was unlawful. It declared that Israel was required to end that presence "as rapidly as possible", immediately cease all new settlement activity, evacuate all settlers, and make reparation for the damage caused by its internationally wrongful acts.

In relation to the prohibition on racial segregation and apartheid in the International Convention on the Elimination of All Forms of Racial Discrimination (CERD), the Court found that Israeli laws "implement a separation" between Palestinians and settlers in the occupied territories in physical and juridical senses, "breach[ing]" Article 3 of CERD. It also found that all states, the United Nations General Assembly, and the Security Council were under obligations not to recognize as legal the situation arising from Israel's unlawful presence and not to render aid or assistance in maintaining it.

The Court identified breaches of international law including forcible evictions, pervasive house demolitions, restrictions on residence and movement, the transfer and retention of settlers into East Jerusalem and the West Bank, the failure to protect Palestinians from settler violence, restrictions on access to water, the extension of Israeli law into the West Bank and East Jerusalem, and the exploitation of natural resources. Although it addressed the Israeli separation policy and distinguishing segregation from apartheid, it did not find that the policy constituted apartheid.

The Court wrote:

The Court considers that the violations by Israel of the prohibition of the acquisition of territory by force and of the Palestinian people's right to self-determination have a direct impact on the legality of the continued presence of Israel, as an occupying Power, in the Occupied Palestinian Territory. The sustained abuse by Israel of its position as an occupying Power, through annexation and an assertion of permanent control over the Occupied Palestinian Territory and continued frustration of the right of the Palestinian people to self-determination, violates fundamental principles of international law and renders Israel's presence in the Occupied Palestinian Territory unlawful.

The Court found that the Israeli–Palestinian peace process did not prevent international law from applying to the situation. It declared that the General Assembly and Security Council should consider the measures required to end Israel's unlawful presence, and that all states were required to cooperate with the United Nations to put the identified obligations into effect.

=== Dissents ===
Vice-President Julia Sebutinde dissented from the principal conclusions. She would have declined to give the opinion because she considered the record inadequate and one-sided, the proceeding an improper circumvention of Israel's lack of consent and the existing negotiation framework, and the direction that Israel end its presence "as rapidly as possible" impracticable without attention to security guarantees and competing sovereignty claims. She also maintained that full reparation was inappropriate and that the Court had misapplied the law of occupation.

Judges Peter Tomka, Ronny Abraham, and Bogdan Aurescu dissented from the conclusion that Israel's continued presence had become unlawful. They argued that illegal annexation and violations of the law of occupation did not make the occupation itself unlawful. They also maintained that the opinion improperly included Gaza and failed to account sufficiently for the Oslo Accords and the rights of Israel and Palestine to security.

== Implementation by the United Nations ==
=== General Assembly ===
The UN confirmed that the matter would be submitted to the General Assembly to determine what action would follow.

Vote on General Assembly resolution ES-10/24: In favour Against Abstained Not voting

On 18 September 2024, the General Assembly adopted a non-binding resolution demanding that Israel end its unlawful presence in the occupied Palestinian territory within 12 months and comply with the obligations identified in the advisory opinion. The resolution passed by 124 votes to 14, with 43 abstentions.

The resolution also called on member states to stop importing products from Israeli settlements in the occupied Palestinian territory and to stop supplying arms, munitions, and related equipment to Israel "in all cases where there are reasonable grounds to suspect that they may be used in the Occupied Palestinian Territory".

The resolution directed Switzerland to convene a Conference of High Contracting Parties to the Fourth Geneva Convention concerning measures to enforce the Convention in the occupied Palestinian territory, including East Jerusalem, within six months.

=== United Nations Security Council ===
Members of the Security Council discussed the opinion and called on the Council to consider measures for its implementation. The Council did not agree on an implementation measure; a 2025 General Assembly committee report described the relevant Council discussions as "deadlocked".

== Reactions ==
=== Political responses in Israel ===
Israeli leaders and politicians decried the ICJ opinion as antisemitic:

- Benjamin Netanyahu called the opinion "a decision of lies", since "the Jewish people are not occupiers in their own land."
- Knesset MP Yuli Edelstein stated that the International Court of Justice has been "hijacked by Islamists and their supporters".
- National Security Minister Itamar Ben-Gvir stated that the decision "proves for the umpteenth time that this is a distinctly antisemitic and political organization."
- The Israeli Minister for Finance Bezalel Smotrich called for an immediate annexation of the West Bank, stating: "The answer to The Hague – sovereignty now."
- Benny Gantz stated that the decision was a testament to outside meddling that was "counterproductive to regional security" but also further evidence for the 'judicialization' of a political conflict.
- Avigdor Lieberman stated that the judgment was an "antisemitic act," and also accused the court of "launching a war" against Israel, which is "already fighting six others."
- Yariv Levin, Israel's Deputy Prime Minister, stated: "No lies [by the World Court] will change the simple fact: the Land of Israel belongs to the people of Israel."
- Israel Katz, Israel's Foreign Minister, stated that the judgment was 'dangerous' in that it plays into the hands of the extremists and "encourages the Palestinian Authority to continue its path of slander."
- Yair Lapid, the opposition leader, stated that the decision was "disconnected, one-sided, tainted by antisemitism," and "serves only Islamic terrorism."
- Ahmad Tibi stated that the verdict "accurately captured reality, determining that the state of segregation and the application of Israeli law in the occupied territories is apartheid."
- The Israeli human rights NGO B'tselem declared, "No more excuses. The international community must force Israel to end the occupation."

=== Political responses in Palestine ===
- The office of Palestinian President Mahmoud Abbas welcomed the opinion and called the decision historic.
- Secretary General of the Executive Committee of the Palestine Liberation Organization Hussein al-Sheikh hailed the verdict as a victory for the Palestinians' right to self-determination, and considered that the judgment amounted to the "collapse and defeat of the Judaization project through confiscation, settlement, displacement, and racist practices against a people under occupation."

=== Political responses in the US ===
- The United States Department of State criticized the ICJ opinion, claiming that it would make future negotiations for a Palestinian state more difficult.

=== Political responses in the UK ===
- The newly formed Labour government said it "respects the independence of the ICJ" and is considering the opinion before making an official response. The Foreign Office added the UK is "strongly opposed to the expansion of illegal settlements and rising settler violence".

=== Political responses in the EU ===
- The European Union backed the ICJ's advisory opinion and stated that the opinion aligns with the bloc's own positions, with its foreign policy chief Josep Borrell saying the opinion would be analyzed on its implication on the EU's policy.
- Belgium Minister of Foreign Affairs, Hadja Lahbib said in a post on X: "The International Court of Justice has ruled that Israel's occupation of the Palestinian territory does not comply with international law and that settlement activity must cease. Belgium will always stand up for the respect of international law."
- Spain said the opinion "includes important pronouncements … on the illegality of the Israeli occupation of the Palestinian territories and on settlements, among other aspects" and that "The government urges the UN and the international community to take into consideration the conclusions of the report and to adopt appropriate measures in this regard".
- The Ministry of Foreign Affairs of Slovenia called on Israel "to comply with its duties and obligations under international law" as laid out in the ICJ's opinion.
- Norway Minister of Foreign Affairs, Espen Barth Eide, said in a post on X: "The ICJ is crystal clear: Israeli policies and practices are to be considered annexation of large parts of the Occupied Palestinian Territory, and are in violation of international law. This is an unequivocal message to Israel, which we expect them to comply with immediately."

=== Political responses in Africa ===
- South Africa Minister of International Relations and Cooperation Ronald Lamola said the opinion "affirms South Africa's long-standing position that the occupation by Israel of Palestinian territory remains unlawful under international law" and that "There is now an additional legal obligation for all states to end complicity in Israel's illegal actions and to act to ensure respect for international law," he said in a statement.

=== Analyses ===
- Daniel Levy, a political analyst, stated the ICJ case would cause third parties to reckon with the consequences of being "complicit in this violation of international law and in guaranteeing impunity for the violating party, namely Israel."
- Ynet journalist Itamar Eichner stated that though the ICJ decision represented the worst-case scenario Israeli politicians feared, the very 'brutality' of the opinion may act in Israel's favour. In his view, it is likely that Israeli leaders are hoping that Donald Trump will win the U.S. elections, and then pass laws against the ICJ and ICC, and impose sanctions on the judges responsible for these verdicts.

== See also ==
- International law and the Arab–Israeli conflict
- International Criminal Court investigation in Palestine
- Legal Consequences of the Construction of a Wall in the Occupied Palestinian Territory
- Legality of the Israeli occupation of Palestine
- Seventy-seventh session of the United Nations General Assembly
- South Africa's genocide case against Israel
- The Hague Group
