= UCL Faculty of Laws =

Law school of University College London

Coordinates: 51.5265°N 0.13102°W

- Established: 1827
- Parent institution: University College London
- Dean: Professor Eloise Scotford
- Academic staff: 90
- Undergraduates: 825
- Postgraduates: 450
- Location: Bentham House, London, United Kingdom
- Website: www.ucl.ac.uk/laws

The UCL Faculty of Laws is the law school of University College London (UCL), a member institution of the federal University of London. It is one of UCL's 11 constituent faculties and is based in London, United Kingdom.

With a history dating back to 1827, the faculty was the first law school in England to admit students regardless of their religion, the first to admit women on equal terms with men, the first to award a law degree to a woman, Eliza Orme, and appointed one of the first three female law professors in the UK, Valentine Korah, who pioneered the study of competition law in Europe.

The faculty in 2022-23 reported a student body comprising 825 enrolled undergraduates, 450 taught full and part time post-graduates and around 50 research (MPhil/PhD) students, and offers a variety of undergraduate and graduate degrees. It publishes a number of journals, including Current Legal Problems and the UCL Journal of Law and Jurisprudence. It is the only university in the UK to hold a legal aid contract, which forms part of its Integrated Legal Advice Clinic (iLAC).

== History ==
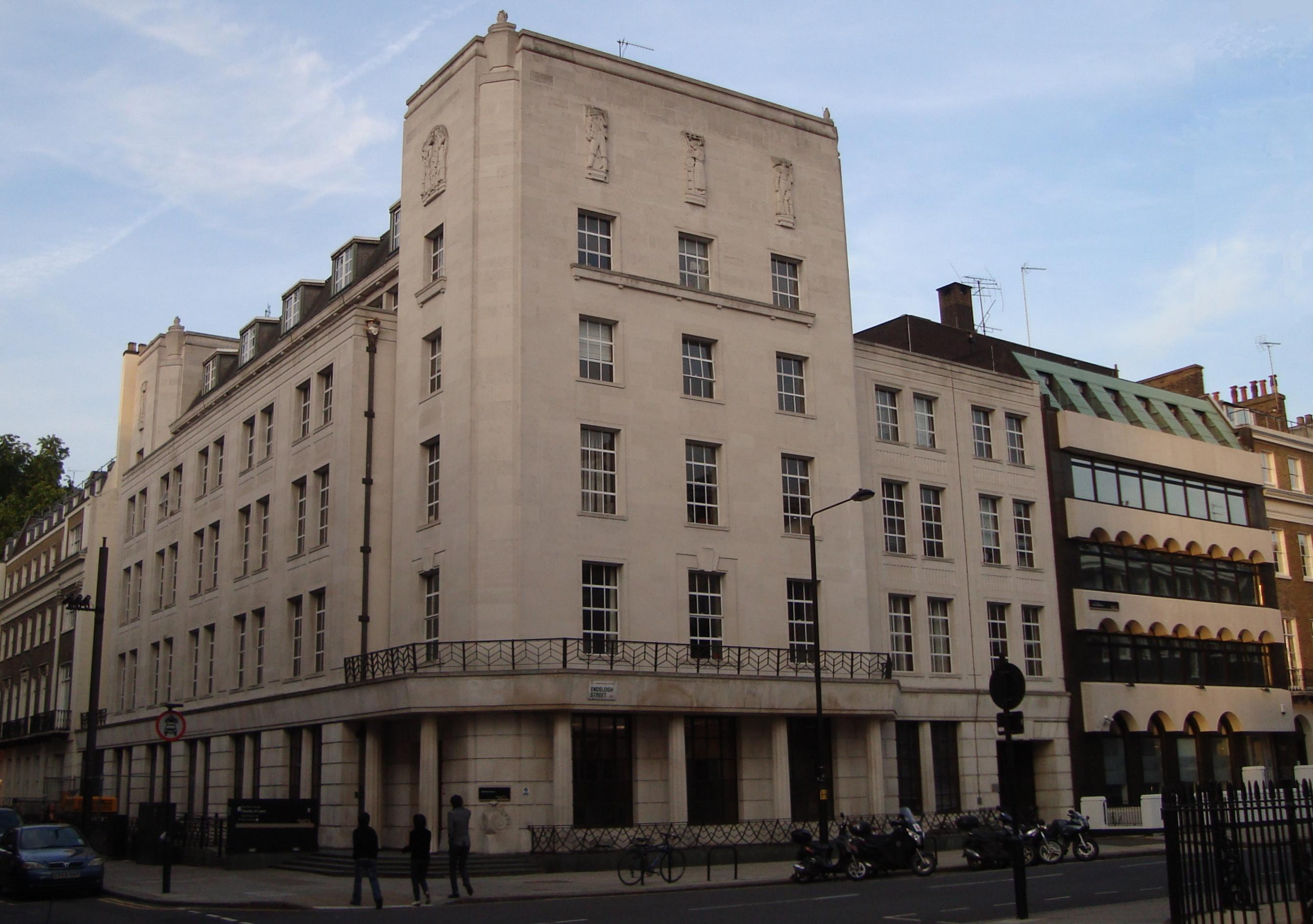
Bentham House, the main building of the UCL Faculty of Laws. The Gideon Schreier Wing can be seen to the right.

The faculty traces its roots to the appointment of the noted legal philosopher, John Austin, as Professor of Jurisprudence in 1827. Andrew Amos, a successful barrister, became the first Professor of English Law (and later Professor of Medical Jurisprudence). However, numbers fell off after the Law Society and the Inner Temple began offering lectures in law in 1833, leading both professors (who were paid by the number of student taught) to resign. Alexander Murison was professor of Roman Law from 1884 to 1925, still paid "five shillings in the guinea" from the student fees; his successor, Herbert Felix Jolowicz, was guaranteed an income of £800 a year. The royal commission of 1898 that led to the reformation of the University of London as a federal institution found that the law classes at UCL were not well attended and, with the Inns of Court having declined to join the federal university, concluded that the teaching in UCL and King's College was insufficient to allow a faculty of laws to be formed. However, an intercollegiate faculty of laws was established in 1906, bringing together UCL, King's and the LSE.

The UCL Faculty of Laws expanded rapidly in the 1960s and soon outgrew its office space. The Faculty of Laws building, later named Bentham House, was bought by the college in 1965. Expanding beyond its traditional strengths of Roman law and jurisprudence, the faculty appointed the UK's first Professor of Air and Space Law in 1967 and offered courses in Russian and Soviet Law. In the mid-2000s, the faculty expanded into the adjacent 1970s building in Endsleigh Street, now the Gideon Schreier Wing.

Previous deans of the faculty include George Williams Keeton, Bin Cheng, Bob Hepple, Jeffrey Jowell, Dawn Oliver, and Dame Hazel Genn. Eloise Scotford has been dean since 2022.

== Building ==
The faculty is based at Bentham House, Endsleigh Gardens, a Grade II listed building a few minutes walk from the main UCL campus. The building is named after philosopher, jurist and reformer Jeremy Bentham (1748–1832), who is closely associated with UCL, and whose collected works are published by the faculty as part of the Bentham Project. The main building was originally constructed in 1954–8 as a headquarters for the National Union of General and Municipal Workers: the exterior decoration includes at fifth-floor level five relief sculptures of industrial workers by Esmond Burton.

Facilities at Bentham House include teaching rooms, lecture halls, a courtroom for moots (formerly the NUGMW's council chamber), a student lounge, a coffee bar and two computer cluster rooms.

In the mid-2010s, Bentham House was redeveloped for £18.5m by architects Levitt Bernstein, a project which was completed in 2018.

== Academics ==
=== Research ===
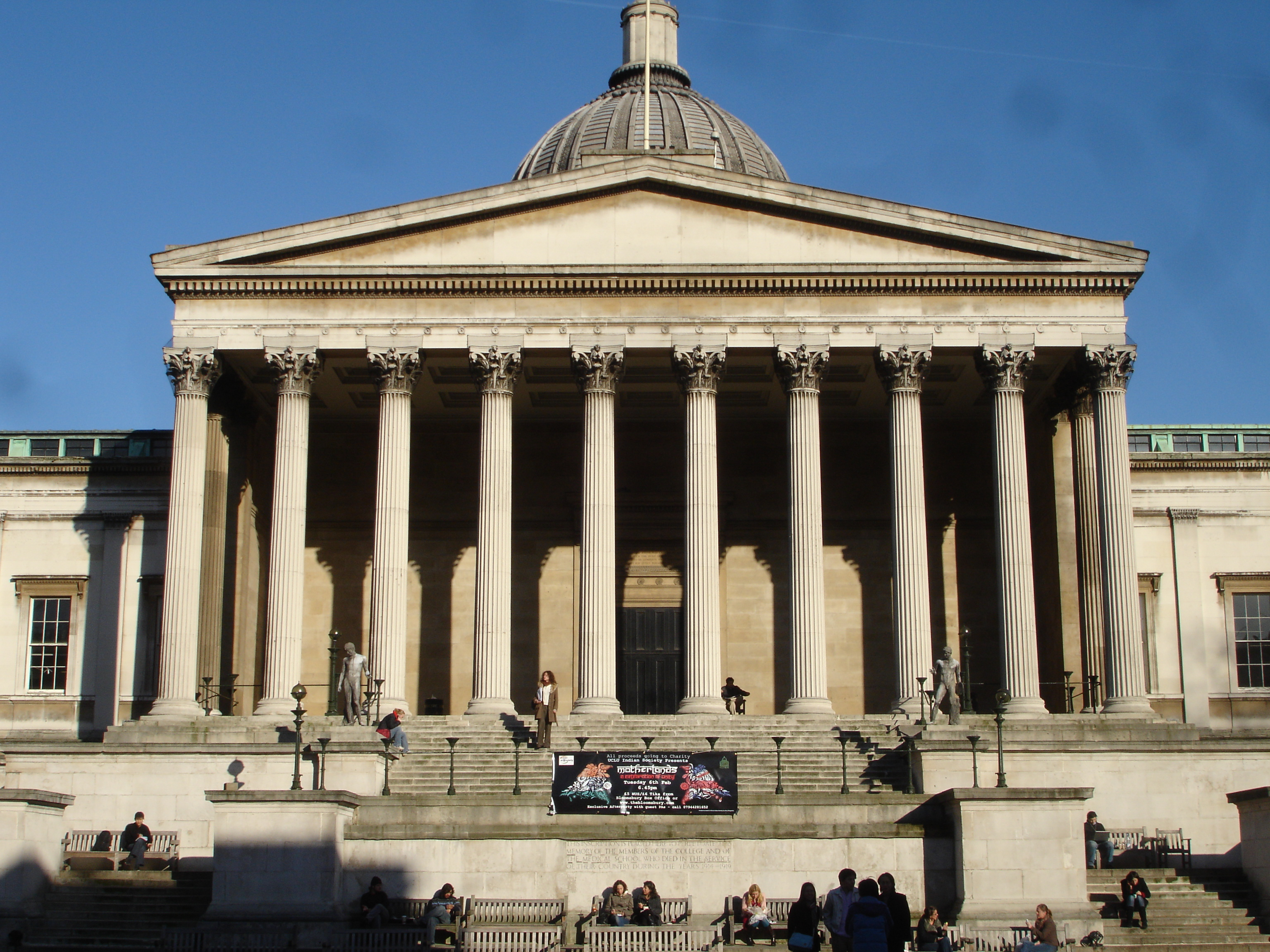
The main portico of University College London

The faculty was placed first in the UK for the quality of its research in the 2021 Research Excellence Framework (REF). The faculty's Judicial Institute, launched in 2010, was the first specialist academic centre for research and teaching about the judiciary to be established in the UK. UCL Laws is home to a number of associated research centres, groups and institutes:

- Bentham Project
- Centre for Access to Justice
- Centre for Commercial Law
- Centre for Criminal Law
- Centre for Empirical Legal Studies
- Centre for Ethics & Law
- Centre for International Courts & Tribunals
- Centre for Law, Economics and Society
- Centre for Law and the Environment
- Centre for Law and Governance in Europe
- Institute of Brand and Innovation Law
- Institute of Global Law
- Institute of Human Rights
- Jevons Institute for Competition Law and Economics
- Judicial Institute
- Labour Rights Institute
- UCL Jurisprudence Group
- UCL Private Law Group
- Human Rights Beyond Borders

=== Teaching ===
==== Undergraduate ====
The faculty reported in 2010 that it receives around 2,500 applications for approximately 140 undergraduate places each year. The minimum entry requirements are A*AA grades at A-level, and a high LNAT score. All candidates to whom an offer is contemplated being made who are identified as requiring particular consideration are interviewed. There are no places available through the UCAS clearing process.

==== Graduate ====
The faculty admits approximately 350 students to its on campus LLM course each year, receiving an average of 2,500 applicants for admission.

The minimum entry requirements for the MPhil and PhD research degrees are a bachelor's degree with first or high upper second honours together with an LLM with an average grade of 65% (ideally with evidence of first class ability).

===== Education policies =====
UCL Laws has been vocal about the impact of AI on education, particularly in regard to its impact on the learning process.

=== Publications ===
The faculty publishes a number of journals, including Current Legal Problems, first published in 1948, and the student journal, UCL Journal of Law and Jurisprudence.

=== Public lectures ===
The faculty hosts a number of free public lectures each week (including, since 1947, the Current Legal Problems series) on a wide range of legal topics. These lectures are delivered by eminent academics from major universities around the world, senior members of the judiciary and leading legal practitioners.

=== Reputation and rankings ===
The faculty was ranked 5th in the UK for law in The Guardian University Guide 2026, 3rd in the Times Good University Guide 2026, and 4th in the Complete University Guide 2027. Internationally, it was ranked 11th for law in the Times Higher Education World University Rankings 2026 by subject, and joint 13th globally in the QS World University Rankings by Subject 2026. In analysis of the 2021 Research Excellence Framework (REF) results by Times Higher Education, the Faculty of Laws was ranked 1st in the United Kingdom for the quality of its research.

== Notable academic staff ==
The Faculty has a large number of academic staff active in research across legal domains, as well as many notable previous staff. These include:

=== Current Academic Staff ===
Name	Title
Dame Hazel Genn KC	Professor of Socio-Legal Studies
Sir Robin Jacob	Sir Hugh Laddie Professor of Intellectual Property
Sir Jonathan Montgomery	Professor of Health Care Law
Eloise Scotford	Professor of Environmental Law
Philippe Sands KC	Professor of the Public Understanding of Law
Anthony Julius	Chair of Law and the Arts
Lawrence Collins, Baron Collins of Mapesbury	Professor of Law
George Letsas	Professor of the Philosophy of Law
Charles Mitchell	Professor of Laws
David Ormerod KC (Hon)	Professor of Criminal Law
Michael Veale	Professor of Technology Law and Policy
Ralph Wilde	Professor of Public International Law
Orla Lynskey	Chair of Law and Technology

=== Emeritus and Former Academic Staff ===
Name	Title
Eric Barendt	Emeritus Professor of Media Law
Wiliam Twining	Quain Professor of Jurisprudence Emeritus
Stephen Guest	Emeritus Professor of Legal Philosophy, Principal Research Associate
Bin Cheng	Professor of Air and Space Law, Dean of the Faculty (1971–1973)
Valentine Korah	Emeritus Professor of Competition Law
Ian Dennis	Emeritus Professor of English Law
Ian Kennedy	Emeritus Professor of Health Law, Ethics and Policy
Ronald Dworkin	Bentham Professor of Jurisprudence
Sir Malcolm Grant	Professor of Law
Sir Hugh Laddie	Professor of Intellectual Property Law
Basil Markesinis KC	Emeritus Professor of Common and Civil Law
George Williams Keeton	Professor of English Law
Michael Freeman	Professor of English Law
Maurice Amos	Quain Professor of Comparative Law
Jeffrey Jowell	Emeritus Professor of Public Law

=== Honorary and Visiting Staff ===
Name	Title
Baroness Hale of Richmond DBE	Honorary Professor of Law; former President of the Supreme Court
Scott Shapiro	Visiting Quain Professor of Law, UCL
Richard Moorhead	Honorary Professor; formerly Professor of Legal Ethics
Robert Carnwath, Lord Carnwath of Notting Hill	Honorary Professor of Law
John Hendy, Baron Hendy	Honorary Professor of Labour Law

== Notable alumni ==
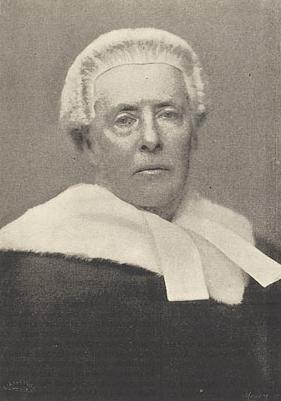
Sir Alfred Wills

=== Judiciary ===
- Taslim Olawale Elias (President of the International Court of Justice 1979–1985)
- Joseph Fok, Permanent Judge of the Hong Kong Court of Final Appeal 2013–Present
- Jeremy Poon, Chief Judge of the High Court of Hong Kong 2019–Present
- Lord Goldsmith QC (Attorney General for England and Wales 2001–2007)
- Chao Hick Tin (Attorney General of Singapore 2006–2008; Judge of Appeal 1999–2006 and 2008–2017)
- Sir Alfred Wills, High Court judge
- Lord Woolf (Lord Chief Justice of England and Wales 2000–2005)
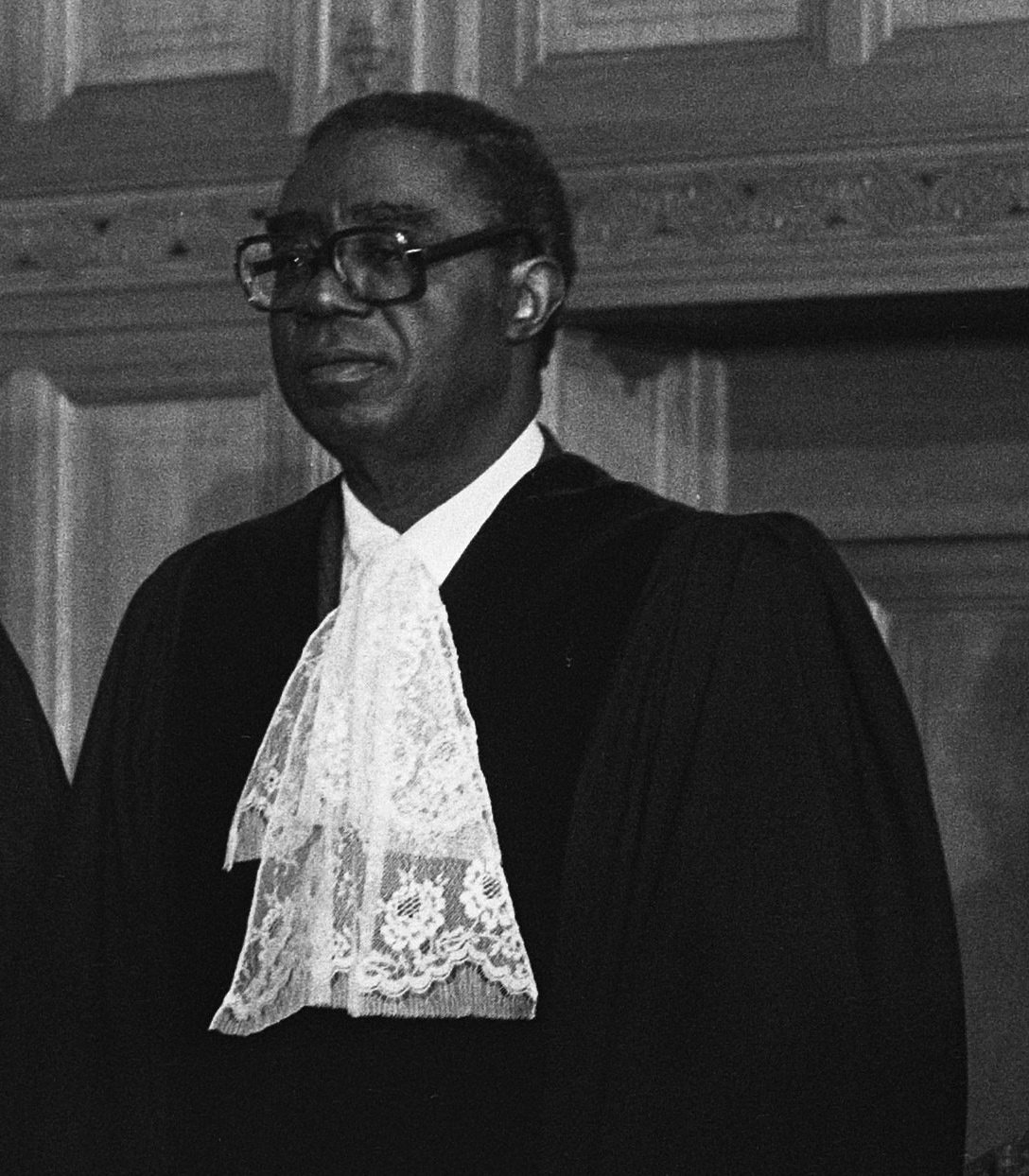
- Taslim Olawale Elias, President of the International Court of Justice
  Sir Vincent Floissac, Chief Justice of the Court of Appeal of the Eastern Caribbean Supreme Court (1991–1996); member of the Judicial Committee of the Privy Council (1992–).
- Dr Adarsh Sein Anand, Judge of the Supreme Court of India (1991–1998) and Chief Justice of India (1998–2001)
- Sudhi Ranjan Das, Judge of the Supreme Court of India (1950–1956) and Chief Justice of India (1956–1959)
- Arifin Zakaria, Chief Justice of Malaysia (2011-2017)
- Cheng Tien-hsi, Judge at the Permanent Court of International Justice (1936–1945) - first ethnically Chinese law doctorate from a British university

=== Other ===
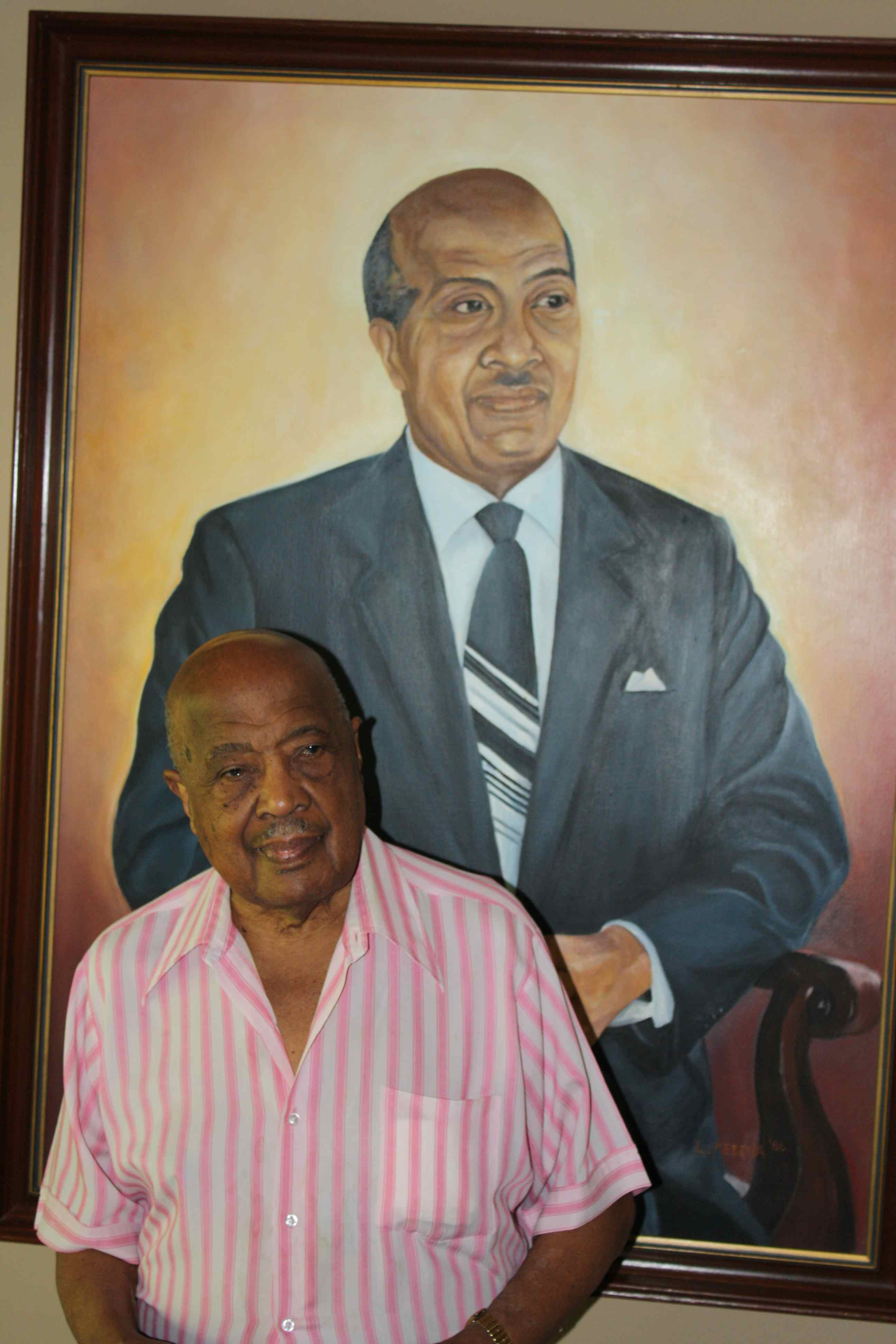
- Sir Ellis Clarke, first president of Trinidad and Tobago and constitutional architect
  Ghazi Abdul Rahman Algosaibi – Saudi Arabian Ambassador to Bahrain (1984 to 1992); Saudi Arabian Ambassador to United Kingdom and Ireland (1992–2002)
- Sir John Baker QC FBA – legal historian; Downing Professor of the Laws of England, University of Cambridge
- Peter Birks QC FBA – Regius Professor of Civil Law, University of Oxford
- Andrew Cayley – International Co-Prosecutor, Khmer Rouge Tribunal (Extraordinary Chambers in the Courts of Cambodia)
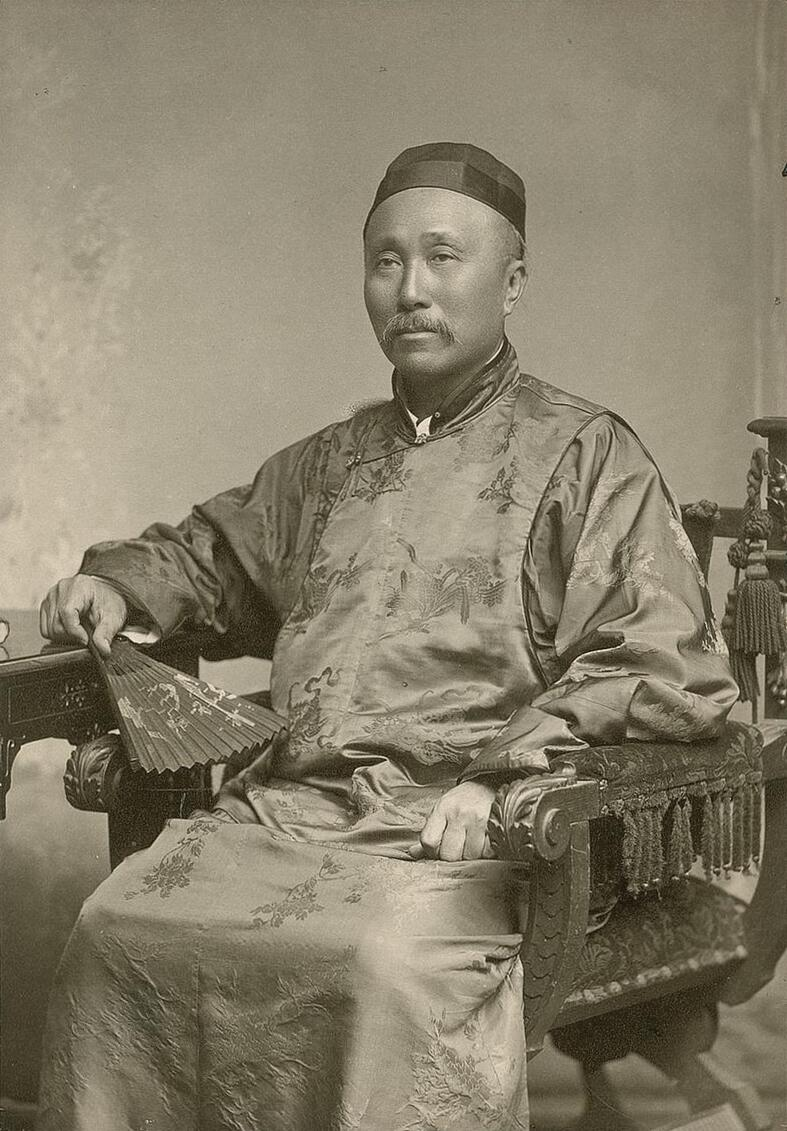
- Wu Ting-fang, first ethnically Chinese barrister in England and Wales and Premier of the Republic of China
  Sir Ellis Clarke – Governor-General of Trinidad and Tobago (1973–1976); President of Trinidad and Tobago (1976–1986)
- Terry Davis – Secretary General of the Council of Europe
- Geoffrey Dear, Baron Dear – Her Majesty's Inspector of Constabulary (1990–1997)
- Wu Ting Fang (1842–1923) – the first ethnic Chinese person to be called to the Bar in England
- Shreela Flather, Baroness Flather – first Asian woman to receive a peerage
- Garry Hart, Baron Hart of Chilton – former Special Adviser to the Lord Chancellor (1998–2007)
- Chaim Herzog – President of Israel (1983–1993)
- Michael Sfard – Israeli Human Rights Lawyer
- J. B. Jeyaretnam – Singapore politician and former leader of the Workers' Party of Singapore
- Sylvia Lim – Member of Parliament in Singapore and Chairman of the Workers' Party of Singapore
- Digby Jones, Baron Jones of Birmingham – British politician and businessman; Minister of State for Trade
- Julie Maxton – Registrar of the University of Oxford (first woman to hold the post)
- John Stuart Mill - Philosopher and Liberal MP – attended lectures on jurisprudence by John Austin at UCL.
- Leonard Sainer – Solicitor and retailer
- L. J. K. Setright – Motoring author and journalist
- Rabindranath Tagore (studied one year; did not graduate) – Bengali poet; Nobel Prize in Literature (1913); first Asian Nobel Laureate
- Carol Thatcher – Journalist, author and media personality
- David Ivor Young, Baron Young of Graffham – Secretary of State for Employment (1985-1987); Secretary of State for Trade and Industry (1987-1989)
- Jerrold Yam - Lawyer and poet
- Soh Rui Yong - Lawyer, World Athletics authorised athlete representative, multiple national marathon champion and national record holder for Singapore, broke the Guinness World Record for fastest ever marathon in a suit at the 2025 London Marathon.

== See also ==
- Institute of Advanced Legal Studies
- List of University College London people in the Law
