= Valentine Korah =

British legal scholar

Valentine (Val) Korah
- Born: 1928
- Died: 2023 (aged 94–95)
- Occupation: Emeritus Professor of Competition Law

Academic background
- Education: University College London
- Thesis: The control of restrictive trade practices: a comparative study (1966)

Academic work
- Discipline: Competition law
- Institutions: UCL Faculty of Laws

Margaret Valentine Latham Korah, commonly known as Val Korah (1928–2023), was an English legal academic. She was the emeritus Professor of Competition Law at the Faculty of Laws, University College London (UCL).

== Early life and education ==
Korah was born in London and educated there at convent schools, although was evacuated to the countryside and during the wartime years. She read for an LLB (1949), LLM (1951) at UCL, took a position at UCL as a lecturer in 1951, after a summer of unsuccessful interviews elsewhere where she was asked if her sex was a 'fatal objection' to such employment.

== Academic career ==
While she was called to the bar in 1954, she focussed on academia, completing a PhD on trade control at UCL. In 1964, Korah established a graduate course in competition law at the Faculty, the second such course on law and economics in the world after an early law and economics of antitrust course at the University of Chicago Law School. Her 1968 monograph, Monopolies and restrictive practices, which coincided with her promotion to Reader, led to her advising Parliamentary Counsel on the creation of the Commission of Industry and Manpower Bill and the Price Commission. In 1971, she was one of only 4 female legal academics with a rank above lecturer in the United Kingdom. She was promoted to Professor of Competition Law in 1982 under the deanship of Jeffrey Jowell.

Korah's influence extended to teaching around the world, from early in her career in tax law at the University of Khartoum, to the College of Europe in Bruges, Fordham University School of Law, Lund University (from where she received an honorary doctorate), Benjamin N. Cardozo School of Law, Monash University, University of Melbourne, University of Macau, University of Michigan, Case Western Reserve University, and the University of Valencia.

She was instrumental in shifting the legal, formalistic view of the European Commission (now DG COMP) to pioneering economic analysis through constant correspondence, education, conferences and engagement. Important to this were her classes jointly taught with René Joliet at the College of Europe, who later became a judge at the European Court of Justice. In the 1990s, particularly through the "new wave" block exemptions on vertical agreements and new guidelines on merger control and competition enforcement priorities, the European Commission's thinking began to shift towards the arguments of Korah and Joliet.

Korah formally retired from UCL in 1993, but continued to be active in teaching and research part-time for many years following her retirement.

== Personal life ==
Korah lived in Hampstead, and regularly swam in Hampstead Heath Ponds. She had 4 children, and regularly recalled that she came to realise the importance of competition law by watching her children compete with each other.

== Selected works ==
- Valentine Korah, ‘EEC Competition Policy—Legal Form or Economic Efficiency’ (1986) 39 Current Legal Problems 85.
- Valentine Korah, An Introductory Guide to EC Competition Law and Practice (9th edn, Hart Publishing 2007)
- Valentine Korah, ‘The Interface between Intellectual Property and Antitrust: The European Experience Symposium: The Federal Circuit and Antitrust’ (2001) 69 Antitrust LJ 801
- Valentine Korah, ‘Concerted Practices’ (1973) 36 The Modern Law Review 220
- Valentine Korah and Denis O’Sullivan, Distribution Agreements Under the EC Competition Rules (Bloomsbury Publishing 2002)
- Valentine Korah, ‘The Rise and Fall of Provisional Validity--The Need for a Rule of Reason in EEC Antitrust Antitrust’ (1981) 3 Nw J Int’l L & Bus 320.
