= Orla Lynskey =

Irish data protection law academic

Orla Lynskey (born 1982) is an Irish academic in the areas of information privacy, data protection and information technology law, who is currently Chair of Law and Technology at the Faculty of Laws, University College London.

== Education ==
Lynskey holds an LLB (Law and French) from Trinity College Dublin, an LLM in European Union Law from the College of Europe, and a PhD from the University of Cambridge.

== Academic career ==
Before joining academia, Lynskey worked as a contract agent for the Directorate-General for Competition and as an antitrust and competition attorney. Lynskey joined LSE Law School in 2012, firstly as Lecturer (Assistant Professor) and was later promoted to associate professor. Lynskey was appointed as Chair of Law and Technology at UCL Faculty of Laws in 2024.

In addition to her UCL post, Lynskey is visiting professor at the College of Europe (since 2020), and holds the post of Global Distinguished Professor at Notre Dame Law School, teaching on their London programme. She is joint Editor-in-Chief of the journal International Data Privacy Law, and an editor at the Modern Law Review.

== Research and impact ==
Lynskey's work has been influential in policy and in practice. Lynskey has given talks for a large number of regulators and public bodies around the world, including the Federal Trade Commission, European Data Protection Supervisor (EDPS), OECD, and the Global Privacy Assembly. Lynskey has addressed the House of Lords on multiple occasions in 2018, and the Joint Committee on Human Rights in 2019 and 2020. She is co-author of The Commonwealth's Model Provisions on Data Protection, which were adopted by the international organisation in 2022. She was a member of the European Commission's 2018 Multistakeholder expert group to support the application of the General Data Protection Regulation, one of only five expert members appointed in this capacity.

Lynskey's work at the intersection of privacy and competition law has been influential in policy and in practice. Her work on this topic has been cited with approval and in recommendations by the OECD, EDPS and the House of Lords. In 2019, she was appointed advisor to the International Competition Network, a network of competition authorities, and in 2020 to BEUC and the Ada Lovelace Institute.

== Selected works ==
- Orla Lynskey, The Foundations of EU Data Protection Law (Oxford University Press 2015).
- Orla Lynskey, 'Deconstructing Data Protection: The "Added-Value" of a Right to Data Protection in the EU Legal Order' (2014) 63 International & Comparative Law Quarterly 569.
- Orla Lynskey, 'Complete and Effective Data Protection' (2023) 76 Current Legal Problems 297.
- Orla Lynskey and Francisco Costa-Cabral, 'Family Ties: The Intersection between Data Protection and Competition in EU Law' (2017) 54 Common Market Law Review.
