= Bin Cheng =

Chinese-born British legal scholar (1921–2019)

Bin Cheng (Chinese: 鄭斌; pinyin: Zhèng Bīn; Wade–Giles: Ch’eng Pin; 1921 – 16 October 2019) was a Chinese-born British legal scholar. An authority on international air and space law, he served as professor and dean of the University College London Faculty of Laws and honorary president of the London Institute of Space Policy and Law. He was a fellow of the Royal Aeronautical Society and an honorary fellow at UCL. He was named an officier of the Ordre des Palmes Academiques by the French government and awarded the Santos-Dumont Merit Medal by the Brazilian government.

== Life and career ==
Bin Cheng was born in 1921 in the Republic of China, with his ancestral home in Zhongshan, Guangdong. He was the son of Cheng Tien-hsi (F. T. Cheng), a jurist and diplomat who served as a judge of the Permanent Court of International Justice and as the last ambassador of the Republic of China to the United Kingdom from 1946 to 1950.

Cheng earned a Licence-en-droit degree from the University of Geneva in Switzerland in 1944. He obtained a Ph.D. in law in 1950 and an LL.D. in 1966, both from University College London (UCL).

Cheng was professor of Air and Space Law at UCL from 1967 to 1986, and was emeritus professor afterwards. From 1971 to 1973, he served as dean of the UCL Faculty of Laws. In 2008, he was named honorary president of the London Institute of Space Policy and Law (ISPL).

== Contributions ==
An authority on international air and space law, Cheng has been described as the "Father of International Air Law".

During the height of the Cold War in the 1960s, Cheng investigated the United Nations General Assembly's resolutions 1721 A (December 1961) and 1962 (December 1963) regarding legal principles governing outer space. He invented the theory of instant customary international law, which states that opinio juris is the only necessary element for the creation of a new customary international law, which may be created "over night" as long as opinio juris about its existence is not rejected by member states of the international community. This theory has gained support over time.

According to the ISPL, Cheng's 1953 book, General Principles of Law as Applied by International Courts and Tribunals, is considered the most important work on the subject.

He was also the author of The Law of International Air Transport (1962) and Studies in International Space Law (1997). The latter reprints his pioneering articles on international air and space law.

In 2017, Cheng donated his collection of more than 3,000 books and legal documents to Northwest University of Politics and Law (NWUPL) in Xi'an, China, and NWUPL established the Bin Cheng Air and Space Law Library and the Cheng Tien-Hsi International Law Library in memory of Cheng and his father.

== Honours ==
- Honorary LLD, Chinese University of Hong Kong (1978)
- Fellow, Royal Aeronautical Society
- Honorary Fellow, University College London
- Officier, Ordre des Palmes Academiques, Government of France (1988)
- Santos-Dumont Merit Medal, Government of Brazil (1989)
- Lifetime Achievement Book Award, International Astronautical Federation (1997)
- Honorary President, London Institute of Space Policy and Law (2008)
- Lifetime Achievement Award, European Air Law Association (2010)

== Personal life ==
Cheng was married to Katherine (Chinese: 傅锦培; pinyin: Fu Jinpei), the eldest daughter of Foo Ping-sheung, who served as ambassador of the Republic of China to the Soviet Union. The couple had a son and a daughter.

Cheng died on 16 October 2019 in London, aged 98.
