= Bernice Lake =

Anguillan-born jurist and legal scholar

Dame Bernice Lake QC
- Born: 1932 or 1933; Anguilla
- Died: September 10, 2011 (aged 78); St. John's, Antigua and Barbuda
- Occupations: Jurist and legal scholar

Dame Bernice Lake QC (1932/1933 – September 10, 2011) was an Anguillan-born jurist and legal scholar whose career spanned more than forty years. In 1985, she became the first woman from the Eastern Caribbean to be appointed Queen's Counsel. Lake was also the first graduate of the University of the West Indies to receive the honor.

Lake was born in Anguilla and attended school on St. Kitts, but resided in Antigua for most of her life. She obtained a degree in history and graduated with honors from the University College of the West Indies at Mona in Jamaica, which later became the University of the West Indies.

Lake worked as a diplomat for the short-lived West Indies Federation's foreign service until the federation collapsed in 1962. Lake soon launched a second career by entering law school at UCL Faculty of Laws at University College London. She campaigned against apartheid in South Africa and other causes as a law student. Lake earned her Honours Degree in Law in 1967.

Lake was admitted to the bar in St. Kitts in 1967 soon after obtaining her law degree. Lake became a prominent jurist, specializing in human rights and constitutional law. Her chambers, Lake & Kentish, which she opened with attorney Joyce Kentish her niece and was later joined by Kendrickson H. Kentish and George Lake, were located on Antigua. Lake was the chief architect of the 1975 Constitution of Anguilla. In 1981, she served as a member of the committee charged with framing the Constitution of Antigua and Barbuda. Another member of the Antiguan constitutional committee, Sydney Christian QC, said of Lake's role in drafting the document, "She was very much in the forefront of the fight for constitutional law and she was always very aggressive in her defence of the Constitution here in Antigua."

Lake was a supporter of the Caribbean Court of Justice (CCJ), which was established in 2001.

In 2004, the government of Antigua and Barbuda bestowed knighthood and the title Dame on Lake for her contributions to the Antiguan and the Caribbean legal systems, as well as her outlook on women's rights, political rights and civil rights. The University of the West Indies awarded Lake an honorary doctorate in law at its Cave Hill campus graduation in Barbados in 2007. In July 2011, the Eastern Caribbean Supreme Court, Anguilla Bar Association, and the other bar associations of the OECS honored her for her contributions at a joint event.

Dame Bernice Lake died at Mount St John Medical Centre in Antigua September 10, 2011, at the age of 78 after a brief illness. Her funeral was held at St Peters Parish Church in Parham with burial in the churchyard. Dignitaries in attendance included Prime Minister of Antigua and Barbuda Baldwin Spencer, Governor-General of Antigua and Barbuda Dame Louise Lake-Tack, opposition leaders and members of the Caribbean legal community. The delegation from Anguilla included Minister of Home Affairs Walcott Richardson.

== See also ==
- First women lawyers around the world
