= Eloise Scotford =

Australian academic (born 1978)

- Occupations: Professor of Environmental Law, Dean of UCL Faculty of Laws

Academic background
- Education: University of Sydney, University of Oxford
- Thesis: The role of environmental principles in the decisions of the European Union courts and New South Wales Land and Environment Court (2010)
- Doctoral advisor: Liz Fisher

Academic work
- Discipline: Environmental law
- Institutions: University College London

Eloise Scotford (born 1978) is an Australian academic, currently Professor of Environmental Law and Dean at the UCL Faculty of Laws.

== Early life and education ==
Scotford grew up in Sydney, Australia. Her mother was a local councillor involved in environmental protection, and her father was a lawyer. She read combined law and sciences at the University of Sydney, where she won the University Medal in Law, and clerked for Chief Justice of Australia Murray Gleeson. Scotford then continued her studies with a Bachelor of Civil Law at Magdalen College, Oxford, graduating with distinction.

== Academic career ==
While preparing a Doctor of Philosophy in Law at University of Oxford, Scotford taught European Union law and environmental law at Corpus Christi College, Oxford as Career Development Fellow. Following this, she was appointed as a lecturer and later senior lecturer at the Dickson Poon School of Law, King's College London, before being appointed Professor of Environmental Law at the Faculty of Laws, University College London (UCL). In 2022, Eloise Scotford was appointed as Dean of UCL Laws.

In addition to these academic appointments, Scotford is an associate member of Landmark Chambers.

== Research interests ==
Scotford's research centres on air quality law, climate change law, waste law, and the interaction of environmental principles with the legal and institutional settings that they find themselves in.

Scotford's research is widely drawn upon by policymakers. She has been invited to give oral evidence to the UK Parliament and the Scottish Parliament, and her research is credited as directly leading to amendments in the Environment Act 2021. Scotford has written policy documents for the Commonwealth Secretariat to inform the Senior Officials of Law Ministries meetings on climate change and law, and for the United Nations Environment Programme on ambient air quality legislation. In addition, Scotford sits on the advisory group for the UK Office for Environmental Protection.

== Selected works ==
- Eloise Scotford, Environmental Principles and the Evolution of Environmental Law (Hart Publishing 2017)
- Eloise Scotford and Rachael Walsh, ‘The Symbiosis of Property and English Environmental Law – Property Rights in a Public Law Context’ (2013) 76 The Modern Law Review 1010
- Elizabeth Fisher, Eloise Scotford and Emily Barritt, ‘The Legally Disruptive Nature of Climate Change’ (2017) 80 The Modern Law Review 173
- Eloise Scotford, ‘Legislation and the Stress of Environmental Problems’ (2021) 74 Current Legal Problems 299.
- Elizabeth Fisher, Bettina Lange, Eloise Scotford and Cinnamon Carlane, ‘Maturity and Methodology: Starting a Debate about Environmental Law Scholarship’ (2009) 21 Journal of Environmental Law 213.
