= The Collected Works of Jeremy Bentham =

Critical edition of the writings of Jeremy Bentham

The Collected Works of Jeremy Bentham is a series of volumes under production at the Bentham Project which, when complete, will form a definitive edition of the writings of the philosopher and reformer Jeremy Bentham (1748–1832). The series includes those texts that were published during Bentham's lifetime, but also the many texts that remained unpublished at his death and exist only in manuscript.

== Scope and history ==
The Collected Works is intended to supersede two earlier editions. The first is the 11-volume The Works of Jeremy Bentham (1838–43), edited by Bentham's friend and literary executor, John Bowring. This edition omits Bentham's writings on religion and is now considered flawed in many points of detail. The second is the 3-volume Jeremy Bentham's Economic Writings (1952–54), edited by Werner Stark, which has likewise been subject to criticism.

The series is published under the auspices of the Bentham Project, based in the Faculty of Laws at University College London (UCL), whose library holds the majority of Bentham's surviving manuscripts. The Bentham Project currently consists of four members of staff: Professor Philip Schofield, the Director of the Project and General Editor of the Collected Works; Dr Tim Causer; Dr Chris Riley; and Dr Peter Lythe. Since 2010, the Project has also hosted Transcribe Bentham, a crowdsourcing initiative for transcribing Bentham's manuscripts. Once edited, the output of this initiative is intended to appear in future Collected Works volumes.

The Bentham Project is governed by the Bentham Committee, which was established in 1959. The first volume in the Collected Works appeared in 1968, and to date 38 volumes have been published. The initial estimate was that the series would eventually run to approximately 38 volumes, but this figure has since risen to a projected total of 85. The series is divided into two sequences: the Correspondence (including letters both to and from Bentham) and the Works (writings which Bentham intended for publication, although many never progressed beyond drafts or outlines).

From 1968 to 1981, the series was published by the Athlone Press (the former publishing house of the University of London). From 1983 to 2019, it was published by Oxford University Press under its Clarendon Press imprint. The first five volumes of Correspondence, originally published by Athlone Press, were reissued with minor corrections in 2017 by UCL Press.

Since the February 2022 publication of Panopticon versus New South Wales, and Other Writings on Australia, the Collected Works has been published by UCL Press in hardback, paperback, and open-access PDF formats.

== General Editors ==
The General Editors of the series have been:

- J. H. Burns (1961–79)
- J. R. Dinwiddy (1977–83)
- Fred Rosen (1983–94)
- Fred Rosen and Philip Schofield (1995–2003)
- Philip Schofield (2003–present)

== Published volumes ==
The 14 volumes of Correspondence and 24 volumes of Works (the Works volumes are not sequentially numbered) that have been published to date are:

=== Correspondence ===
- Sprigge, Timothy L. S., ed. (1968). The Correspondence of Jeremy Bentham, Volume 1: 1752–76. London: Athlone Press. ISBN 048513201X. (Reissued with minor corrections by UCL Press in 2017: ISBN 978-1-911576-05-1)
- Sprigge, Timothy L. S., ed. (1968). The Correspondence of Jeremy Bentham, Volume 2: 1777–80. London: Athlone Press. ISBN 0485132028. (Reissued with minor corrections by UCL Press in 2017: ISBN 978-1-911576-29-7)
- Christie, Ian R., ed. (1971). The Correspondence of Jeremy Bentham, Volume 3: January 1781 to October 1788. London: Athlone Press. ISBN 0485132036. (Reissued with minor corrections by UCL Press in 2017: ISBN 978-1-911576-11-2)
- Taylor Milne, Alexander, ed. (1981). The Correspondence of Jeremy Bentham, Volume 4: October 1788 to December 1793. London: Athlone Press. ISBN 0485132044. (Reissued with minor corrections by UCL Press in 2017: ISBN 978-1-911576-17-4)
- Taylor Milne, Alexander, ed. (1981). The Correspondence of Jeremy Bentham, Volume 5: January 1794 to December 1797. London: Athlone Press. ISBN 0485132052. (Reissued with minor corrections by UCL Press in 2017: ISBN 978-1-911576-23-5)
- Dinwiddy, J. R., ed. (1984). The Correspondence of Jeremy Bentham, Volume 6: January 1798 to December 1801. Oxford: Clarendon Press. ISBN 0198226136.
- Dinwiddy, J. R., ed. (1988). The Correspondence of Jeremy Bentham, Volume 7: January 1802 to December 1808. Oxford: Clarendon Press. ISBN 0198226144.
- Conway, Stephen, ed. (1988). The Correspondence of Jeremy Bentham, Volume 8: January 1809 to December 1816. Oxford: Clarendon Press. ISBN 0198226152.
- Conway, Stephen, ed. (1989). The Correspondence of Jeremy Bentham, Volume 9: January 1817 to June 1820. Oxford: Clarendon Press. ISBN 0198226160.
- Conway, Stephen, ed. (1994). The Correspondence of Jeremy Bentham, Volume 10: July 1820 to December 1821. Oxford: Clarendon Press. ISBN 0198226179.
- Fuller, Catherine, ed. (2000). The Correspondence of Jeremy Bentham, Volume 11: January 1822 to June 1824. Oxford: Clarendon Press. ISBN 0198208669.
- O'Sullivan, Luke; Fuller, Catherine, eds. (2006). The Correspondence of Jeremy Bentham, Volume 12: July 1824 to June 1828. Oxford: Clarendon Press. ISBN 9780199278305.
- Schofield, Philip; Causer, Tim; Riley, Chris, eds. (2024). The Correspondence of Jeremy Bentham, Volume 13: July 1828 to June 1832. London: UCL Press. ISBN 9781800086128
- Schofield, Philip; Causer, Tim; Riley, Chris, eds. (2026). The Correspondence of Jeremy Bentham, Volume 14: Supplementary Letters. London: UCL Press. ISBN 9781800089365

=== Works ===
- Bentham, Jeremy (1970). Hart, H. L. A. (ed.). Of Laws in General. London: Athlone Press. ISBN 0485132109.

— Now superseded by: Bentham, Jeremy (2010). Schofield, Philip (ed.). Of the Limits of the Penal Branch of Jurisprudence. Oxford: Clarendon Press. ISBN 9780199570737.

- Bentham, Jeremy (1970). Burns, J. H.; Hart, H. L. A. (eds.). An Introduction to the Principles of Morals and Legislation. London: Athlone Press. ISBN 0485132117. (Reprinted in paperback with a new introduction by F. Rosen and an interpretive essay by H. L. A. Hart: An Introduction to the Principles of Morals and Legislation. Oxford: Clarendon Press. 1996. ISBN 0198205163.)
- Bentham, Jeremy (1977). Burns, J. H.; Hart, H. L. A. (eds.). A Comment on the Commentaries and A Fragment on Government. London: Athlone Press. ISBN 0485132125. (Reissued: A Comment on the Commentaries and A Fragment on Government. Oxford: Clarendon Press. 2008. ISBN 978-0-19-955347-1.)
- Bentham, Jeremy (1983). Rosen, F.; Burns, J. H. (eds.). Constitutional Code, Vol. I. Oxford: Clarendon Press. ISBN 019822608X.
- Bentham, Jeremy (1983). Smith, M.J.; Burston, W. H. (eds.). Chrestomathia. Oxford: Clarendon Press. ISBN 0198226101.
- Bentham, Jeremy (1983). Goldworth, Amnon (ed.). Deontology together with A Table of the Springs of Action and Article on Utilitarianism. Oxford: Clarendon Press. ISBN 0198226098.
- Bentham, Jeremy (1989). Schofield, Philip (ed.). First Principles preparatory to Constitutional Code. Oxford: Clarendon Press. ISBN 0198227477.
- Bentham, Jeremy (1990). Schofield, Philip (ed.). Securities against Misrule and other Constitutional Writings for Tripoli and Greece. Oxford: Clarendon Press. ISBN 0198227256.
- Bentham, Jeremy (1993). Schofield, Philip (ed.). Official Aptitude Maximized; Expense Minimized. Oxford: Clarendon Press. ISBN 0198204035.
- Bentham, Jeremy (1995). Schofield, Philip (ed.). Colonies, Commerce, and Constitutional Law: Rid Yourselves of Ultramaria and other writings on Spain and Spanish America. Oxford: Clarendon Press. ISBN 0198226128.
- Bentham, Jeremy (1998). Schofield, Philip; Harris, Jonathan (eds.). 'Legislator of the World': Writings on Codification, Law, and Education. Oxford: Clarendon Press. ISBN 0198207476.
- Bentham, Jeremy (1999). James, Michael; Blamires, Cyprian; Pease-Watkin, Catherine (eds.). Political Tactics. Oxford: Clarendon Press. ISBN 0198207727.
- Bentham, Jeremy (2001). Quinn, Michael (ed.). Writings on the Poor Laws, Vol. I. Oxford: Clarendon Press. ISBN 0199242321.
- Bentham, Jeremy (2002). Schofield, Philip; Pease-Watkin, Catherine; Blamires, Cyprian (eds.). Rights, Representation, and Reform: Nonsense upon Stilts and Other Writings on the French Revolution. Oxford: Clarendon Press. ISBN 019924863X.
- Bentham, Jeremy (2010). Quinn, Michael (ed.). Writings on the Poor Laws, Vol. II. Oxford: Clarendon Press. ISBN 9780199559633.
- Bentham, Jeremy (2011). Crimmins, James E.; Fuller, Catherine (eds.). Church-of-Englandism and its Catechism Examined. Oxford: Clarendon Press. ISBN 978-0-19-959025-4.
- Bentham, Jeremy (2012). Pease-Watkin, Catherine; Schofield, Philip (eds.). On the Liberty of the Press, and Public Discussion, and other Legal and Political Writings for Spain and Portugal. Oxford: Clarendon Press. ISBN 978-0-19-964273-1.
- Bentham, Jeremy (2014). Schofield, Philip; Pease-Watkin, Catherine; Quinn, Michael (eds.). Of Sexual Irregularities and Other Writings on Sexual Morality. Oxford: Clarendon Press. ISBN 978-0-19-968518-9.
- Bentham, Jeremy (2015). Schofield, Philip (ed.). The Book of Fallacies. Oxford: Clarendon Press. ISBN 978-0-19-871981-6.
- Bentham, Jeremy (2016). Quinn, Michael (ed.). Writings on Political Economy, Vol. I: including Defence of Usury; Manual of Political Economy; and A Protest against Law Taxes. Oxford: Clarendon Press. ISBN 978-0-19-876796-1.
- Bentham, Jeremy (2016). Long, Douglas G.; Schofield, Philip (eds.). Preparatory Principles. Oxford: Clarendon Press. ISBN 978-0-19-878290-2.
- Bentham, Jeremy (2019). Quinn, Michael (ed.). Writings on Political Economy, Vol. II: Financial Resources; including Supply without Burthen; and Proposals relative to Divers Modes of Supply. Oxford: Clarendon Press. ISBN 978-0-19-880900-5.
- Bentham, Jeremy (2019). Causer, Tim; Schofield, Philip (eds.). Panopticon versus New South Wales, and Other Writings on Australia. London: UCL Press. ISBN 9781787359376.
- Bentham, Jeremy (2025). Schofield, Philip (ed.). Essays on Logic, Ethics, and Universal Grammar. London: UCL Press. ISBN 9781800089198.
- Bentham, Jeremy (2027). Schofield, Philip; Riley, Chris; Causer, Tim (eds.). A Picture of the Treasury. London: UCL Press. ISBN 9781806551736
