= Alexander Taylor Milne =

Alexander Taylor Milne (January 1906 – 1994) was an English historian and the secretary and librarian of the Royal Historical Society. He was responsible for the compilation of a number of bibliographies of historical sources, as well as the editing of two volumes of the correspondence of Jeremy Bentham.
