= George Williams Keeton =

English barrister, legal scholar and academic

George Williams Keeton, FBA (22 May 1902 – 2 October 1989) was an English legal scholar and academic.

== Biography ==
Born in Sheffield, Keeton studied at Gonville and Caius College, Cambridge, graduating in 1923 with a first-class BA and an LLB. He was appointed Reader in Law and Politics at the University of Hong Kong in 1924, remaining there for three years. In the meantime, he completed an LLM at the University of Cambridge (1927). He also worked as a tutor at Clare College, Cambridge. In 1928, he was called to the bar at Gray's Inn and appointed to a senior lectureship at the University of Manchester and in 1931 he moved to University College London to accept a readership. The next year, he was awarded the LLD degree by Cambridge.

Keeton was promoted to be Professor of English Law at UCL in 1937 and served as dean of the faculty from 1939 to 1957 and vice-provost from 1966 to 1969. In the latter year, he had to retire from University College, but took up a professorship at the University of Notre Dame (serving until 1971) and an associate professorship at Brunel University (finally retiring in 1977). Alongside these appointments, he was principal (1938–52) and then president of the London Institute of World Affairs, and was co-editor of The Modern Law Review from 1937 to 1939; he was also editor of The Solicitor.

He authored books on wide-ranging topics, including charity law, the law of equity the law of trusts, the law of international relations, jurisprudence, and legal history. He received three honorary doctorates and was elected a fellow of the British Academy in 1964.
