= George Letsas =

George Letsas is the Chair in Philosophy of Law at University College London, a role he has held since 2014.

== Education ==
Letsas read law at the University of Athens, graduating with an LLB in 1999. He then attained an MA in either 2000 or 2001 and a PhD in law in 2005, both from UCL.

== Academic career ==
After completing his PhD, Letsas became a lecturer in the Faculty of Laws in 2006, becoming a reader in 2009 and professor of the Philosophy of Law in 2014. He is also an affiliate member of the department of philosophy and Co-Director of the UCL Institute for Human Rights.

== Works ==
- Klass, Gregory; Letsas, George; Saprai, Prince, eds. (2014). Philosophical Foundations of Contract Law. Oxford University Press. ISBN 978-0-19-102207-4.
- Letsas, George (2007). A Theory of Interpretation of the European Convention on Human Rights. Oxford University Press. ISBN 978-0-19-920343-7.
