= Legality of the Israeli occupation of Palestine =

Illegal Israeli occupation of Palestine

In 2024, the International Court of Justice advised the United Nations General Assembly that Israel's occupation of the Palestinian territories was unlawful because of its violations of the prohibition on acquiring territory by force and the Palestinian people's right to self-determination. The occupation has continued since 1967 and is the longest military occupation in modern history. The Court's conclusion encompassed the West Bank, including Israeli-annexed East Jerusalem, as well as the blockaded Gaza Strip, which is still considered occupied under international law despite the 2005 Israeli disengagement. The Court also found that Israel's policies and practices in the occupied West Bank, including the construction and expansion of Israeli settlements, amounted to unlawful annexation.

The legality of the occupation as a whole is a subject that has received much less attention than violations of international humanitarian law (IHL) and international human rights law (IHRL) that have occurred during the occupation. Multiple General Assembly resolutions have described the continuing occupation as illegal. The general thrust of international law scholarship addressing this question has concluded that, regardless of whether it was initially legal, the occupation has become illegal over time. Reasons cited for its illegality include use of force for impermissible purposes such as annexation, violation of the Palestinian right to self-determination, that the occupation itself is an illegal regime "of alien subjugation, domination and exploitation", or some combination of these factors. Eyal Benvenisti suggested that refusal by an occupier to engage in good faith with efforts to reach a peaceful solution should not only be considered illegal but as outright annexation. International law scholar Ralph Wilde states that "The common way of understanding the extended duration of the occupation... is a prolonged violation of international law".

In September 2024, the General Assembly voted 124–14, with 43 abstentions, to demand that Israel end its occupation within twelve months. The government of Israel disputes the opinion and maintains that Israel has claims to the West Bank, which it considers disputed territory whose permanent status must be resolved through direct negotiations.

== Background ==
The Israeli occupation of Palestine that began in 1967 is the longest military occupation in modern history. Since the Israeli disengagement from Gaza in 2005, it is the prevailing opinion that Gaza is still under occupation according to international law; the Israeli occupation of the West Bank is an ongoing occupation. Israel has argued that the territories in Palestine are disputed, rather than occupied. It has also argued that neither the Hague Regulations nor the Fourth Geneva Convention limits the duration of the occupation or requires the occupant to restore the territories to the sovereign before a peace treaty is signed. Israel's High Court has applied to the territories the humanitarian provisions of the Fourth Geneva Convention, without confirming the applicability of the entire Convention. According to many interpretations, Israel has purportedly annexed parts of Palestine, including East Jerusalem, but such annexation is illegal under international law under the prohibition on the acquisition of territory through force. Its treatment of other areas of the West Bank has been described as a de facto annexation and "creeping annexation" showing an ultimate intention to permanently take over the territory. The first report of the Permanent United Nations Fact Finding Mission on the Israel Palestine conflict released on 7 June 2022, said that the root cause of the problems lay in "perpetual occupation" with no intent to end it and that Israel wanted "complete control" over the occupied area. On 20 October 2022, the Independent International Commission of Inquiry on the Occupied Palestinian Territory released a second report to the General Assembly, calling on the Security Council to end Israel's "permanent occupation" and on individual UN member states to prosecute Israeli officials. The report found "reasonable grounds" to conclude that the occupation "is now unlawful under international law due to its permanence" and Israel's "de facto annexation policies". Israeli prime minister Yair Lapid called the report "biased, false, inciting and blatantly unbalanced" and "anti-Semitic".

On 11 November 2022, the United Nations General Assembly Fourth Committee approved by 98 votes to 17, with 52 abstentions, a draft resolution requesting an advisory opinion from the International Court of Justice (ICJ) on the legal consequences of Israel's prolonged occupation, settlement and annexation of the Palestinian territory occupied since 1967. On 30 December 2022, the General Assembly adopted the resolution by 87 votes to 26, with 53 abstentions, formally requesting the advisory opinion.

The request was transmitted to the ICJ for an advisory opinion on Legal consequences arising from the policies and practices of Israel in the occupied Palestinian territory including East Jerusalem. On 19 July 2024, the Court found that Israel's continued presence in the occupied Palestinian territory was unlawful.

== Use of force ==
According to international law, annexation is not an acceptable motive for the use of force in international law, nor is it legal to acquire territory through the use of force. An occupation maintained for the purpose of territorial aggrandizement is no different from an explicit annexation according to international law—both are illegal. Israel therefore may not annex the Palestinian territories, nor may it continue the occupation because of desire to incorporate these territories. Israel states that the occupation is justified as self-defense, but there has been little legal analysis of the occupation in relation to laws governing the use of force. For the occupation to be legal, it would need to be a justified and proportional use of force when it began and continuously from 1967 to the present, in self-defense of the original threat or a comparable threat. The legality of using force in self-defense against non-state actors is disputed. Many international law experts and states doubt that extended occupations can ever be legal according to international law. Illegal occupation constitutes an act of aggression in international law and could also be a crime of aggression.

Some commentators have proposed that an occupation that is initially legal will remain so until a peace treaty is signed. A peace treaty is not synonymous with the absence of a threat justifying the use of force in self-defense, without which military aggression becomes illegal. According to Wilde, "it is not credible to regard the occupation as a necessary and proportionate means of ensuring Israel’s security" and therefore, the continuation of the occupation "has been and is unlawful under the law on the use of force". Many United Nations General Assembly resolutions have condemned the Israeli occupation of Palestine as a violation of international law and the Charter of the United Nations.

== Self-determination ==
The Palestinian right to self-determination is internationally recognized. Regardless of whether a Palestinian state currently exists, the sovereignty in the occupied Palestinian territories belongs to the Palestinian people. International law scholar Ralph Wilde states, "given that the Palestinian people have not agreed that all or part of the oPt is to be Israeli territory, the default requirement of the law of self-determination is that they should be immediately freed from the impediments to self-rule", including a speedy end to the occupation.

== Other legal frameworks ==
The question of the legality of the occupation is largely separate from violations of international humanitarian law (IHL) and international human rights law (IHRL) that have occurred during the occupation. It is also separate from international criminal law including the occurrence of war crimes and the argument that Israel's policies constitute a crime of apartheid. According to Wilde, these violations of jus in bello "just aggravate the illegality" of the occupation. Valentina Azarova writes that systematic violations of IHL and human rights are intertwined with the issue of prolonged occupation. Azarova also suggested that unlawfully prolonged occupations can also "be treated as manifestations of outlawed colonial practices of foreign domination, political subjugation, and economic exploitation". An interpretive statement issued by the United Nations Human Rights Committee ruled that acts of aggression occasioning loss of life inherently violate the right to life guaranteed by the International Covenant on Civil and Political Rights.

Occupation law, as a branch of IHL, regulates the conduct of occupation but does not address the question of the legality of the occupation itself. In a 2005 paper, Orna Ben-Naftali, Aeyal Gross, and Keren Michaeli argue that because occupation is intended to be temporary, a prolonged occupation would inherently violate occupation law. They rate the Israeli occupation of Palestine as illegal for this reason and others. According to Gross, a prolonged occupation also undermines the rule that sovereignty may not derive from occupation.

== Overall assessments ==
In European Journal of International Law, Ardi Imseis argues that "Israel’s occupation has become illegal over time for being in violation of three jus cogens norms of international law: the prohibition on the acquisition of territory through force, the obligation to respect the right of peoples to self-determination and the obligation to refrain from imposing regimes of alien subjugation, domination and exploitation inimical to humankind, including racial discrimination".

Vito Todeschini argues that the prolonged and indefinite nature of the occupation of the West Bank, including East Jerusalem, makes it illegal under both jus ad bellum and international humanitarian law.

In 2017, Michael Lynk, the United Nations Special Rapporteur on the occupied Palestinian territories, concluded that Israel's role as occupying power had "crossed a red line into illegality" and recommended a United Nations study of the occupation's legality. In April 2022, his successor, Francesca Albanese, similarly said that the occupation had crossed a "red line of legality" because occupation must be temporary, justified by military necessity, and administered in the interest of the occupied population.

=== International Court of Justice ===
==== 2004 advisory opinion ====
In its 2004 advisory opinion on the West Bank barrier, the ICJ held that the West Bank, including East Jerusalem, was occupied territory, that the Hague Regulations reflected customary international law, and that the Fourth Geneva Convention applied de jure. It held that the destruction or requisition of property for the barrier contravened Articles 46 and 52 of the Hague Regulations and Article 53 of the Fourth Geneva Convention; that restrictions on movement violated Article 12(1) of the International Covenant on Civil and Political Rights; and that interference with work, health, education, and an adequate standard of living violated Articles 6, 7, and 11–14 of the International Covenant on Economic, Social and Cultural Rights. The Court separately found that the Israeli settlements in the occupied Palestinian territory, including East Jerusalem, had been established in breach of Article 49(6) of the Fourth Geneva Convention, and that the barrier and its associated régime further contravened Article 49(6) by contributing to demographic changes. It also held that the barrier severely impeded the Palestinian people's right to self-determination. The Court declared that Israel must "cease forthwith" construction of the barrier in the occupied territory, "dismantle forthwith" the portions situated there, repeal or render ineffective the related legal measures, and "make reparation".

Judge Thomas Buergenthal dissented from the principal conclusions because the record did not permit the Court to assess Israel's claims of necessity. Judge Pieter Kooijmans' partial dissent questioned the basis for a positive duty to ensure Israel's compliance with the Fourth Geneva Convention.

The government of Israel rejected the opinion as politically motivated and "one-sided", and maintained that disputes over the barrier should be resolved through direct negotiations. The General Assembly adopted resolution ES-10/15 by 150 votes to 6, with 10 abstentions, demanding that Israel comply with the legal obligations identified in the opinion. Before the General Assembly requested the opinion, the United States vetoed a draft Security Council resolution that would have declared the barrier illegal and demanded that its construction stop and be reversed, by a vote of 10 to 1, with 4 abstentions.

==== 2024 advisory opinion ====
In its 2024 advisory opinion, the ICJ opined on the legality of the occupation as a whole. The Court found that Israel's policies and practices, which were intended to remain in place indefinitely and create irreversible effects, amounted to annexation. By eleven votes to four, it held that Israel's assertion of permanent control and continued frustration of Palestinian self-determination rendered Israel's continued presence unlawful throughout the occupied Palestinian territory. This conclusion did not end Israel's obligations under the law of occupation while it continued to exercise effective control. The Court excluded from the scope of the opinion Israel's conduct in the Gaza Strip in response to the attacks of 7 October 2023. The Court declared that Israel must bring its unlawful presence in the occupied Palestinian territory to an end "as rapidly as possible", cease all new settlement activity immediately, evacuate all settlers, and "provide full reparation".

Vice-President Julia Sebutinde dissented from the principal conclusions because, inter alia, she considered the record inadequate. Judges Peter Tomka, Ronny Abraham, and Bogdan Aurescu disagreed that the occupation had become unlawful.

The government of Israel rejected the opinion as "fundamentally wrong" and maintained that it ignored the attacks of 7 October 2023 and Israel's security concerns. The General Assembly adopted resolution ES-10/24 by 124 votes to 14, with 43 abstentions, demanding that Israel end its unlawful presence within 12 months. The Security Council did not adopt corresponding measures.

== Consequences ==
According to Azarova, "Since the very presence of such occupying states in the occupied territory presents a threat to the indigenous civilian population of the occupied territory, the principal task of international law is to eliminate such unlawful situations through restitution of the occupied territory to the status quo ante bellum". Azarova has encouraged European Union policymakers to uphold the legal obligation of non-recognition of violations of international law—including Israel's de facto annexation of the West Bank—and to "rethink a failed peace-making model".

Imseis states that if the occupation is an internationally wrongful act, an immediate end to the wrong—rather than waiting for a negotiated compromise—would be the correct solution according to international law on state responsibility. Conducting negotiations while the illegal occupation is maintained, in his view, "could be abused by the more powerful party to consolidate its illegal actions under a cloak of legitimacy provided by the UN". According to the principle of ex injuria jus non oritur, the violator of international law may not derive a benefit from its violations.

Focus on the methods of occupation and individual IHL and IHRL has been criticized for overlooking the larger question of whether the occupation itself is legal, or even legitimizing the occupation itself. The overall focus on the occupation has been criticized by Wilde and Hani Sayed as reinforcing the two-state solution paradigm, and erasing important political questions such as the consequences of the 1948 Palestinian expulsion and flight, Palestinian refugees, the status of Palestinian residents of Israel, and other issues relevant to the Israel–Palestinian conflict.

== See also ==
- International law and the Arab–Israeli conflict
