= Hazel Genn =

Dame Hazel Gillian Genn, DBE, KC (Hon), FBA (born 1949) is a leading authority on civil justice whose work has had a major influence on policy-makers around the world, and is a former Dean of the Faculty of Laws and Professor of Socio-Legal Studies at University College London.

== Public service ==
Genn is a lay member of the Judicial Appointments Commission. She was formerly: a member of the Economic and Social Research Council, where she served as chair of the Research Grants Board; a member of the Committee on Standards in Public Life; chair of the Public Legal Education and Support (PLEAS) task force; chair of the Advisory Panel for research on Family Advice and Information for the Legal Services Commission; chair of main panel J of the Research Assessment Exercise 2008.

== Education and early career ==
Genn is the daughter of Lionel and Dorothy Genn. She attended Minchenden Grammar School and studied for a joint degree in Sociology, Social Anthropology and Social Administration at the University of Hull. In 1972, she abandoned work towards an M.A. in Sociology and became a researcher, first at Cambridge Institute of Criminology (1972–74), then at the Oxford University Centre for Socio-Legal Studies (1974–1985) as a member of Wolfson College, Oxford, during which she also achieved her LLB.

She joined the Law Department at Queen Mary College, University of London in 1985, and became Professor and Head of Department in 1991. In 1994 she went to work at University College London, where she has remained.

== Honours ==
Genn was created a Dame Commander of the Order of the British Empire (DBE) on 17 June 2006, elevated from Commander of the Order of the British Empire (CBE). She was awarded honorary fellowship of Queen Mary in 2004, and the honorary degree of Doctor of Laws by the University of Edinburgh in 2004, and by the University of Leicester on 13 July 2007. She was appointed an honorary Queen's Counsel in 2006. In 2011 Dame Hazel became a patron of the Aberdeen Law Project.
