= William Twining =

British jurist and law professional (1934–2025)

William Twining FBA
- Born: 22 September 1934
- Died: 9 October 2025 (aged 91)

Academic work
- Discipline: Jurisprudence
- School or tradition: Law in Context
- Institutions: Queen's University Belfast; University of Warwick; University College London
- Main interests: Law of evidence

William Lawrence Twining (22 September 1934 – 9 October 2025) was a British legal scholar. He was the Quain Professor of Jurisprudence at the Faculty of Laws, University College London from 1983 until 1996 and then Research Professor of Law there from 1996 to 2004 before retiring as Quain Emeritus. He was a leading member of the Law in Context movement, and contributed especially to jurisprudence, evidence and proof, legal method, legal education, and intellectual history. Twining's work also focused on "globalization" and legal theory.

== Life and career ==
Twining was born on 22 September 1934. He was born in Kampala, in the Protectorate of Uganda, but spent his early childhood in British Mauritius. He was sent to England to be educated at Charterhouse, then went on to study Law at the University of Oxford (1952–1955). He then undertook further studies in law at the University of Chicago (1957–58).

Central themes of Twining's contributions to legal matters include the variety and complexity of legal phenomena; the proposition that many so-called “global” processes and patterns are sub-global, linked to empires, diasporas, alliances, and legal traditions; that diffusion, legal pluralism, and surface law are important topics for both analytical and empirical jurisprudence; that, in a world characterised by profound diversity of beliefs and radical poverty, the discipline of law needs to engage with problems of constructing just and workable supra-national institutions and practices; and that adopting a global perspective challenges some of the main working assumptions of Western traditions of academic law.

At the start of his career, Twining taught for seven years in Sudan and Tanzania. He maintained an interest in Eastern Africa, and more broadly the Commonwealth. He also studied and taught in several leading UK and American law schools, holding chairs at the universities of Belfast and Warwick.

He died on 9 October 2025, at the age of 91.

== Publications ==
- Twining, William (2009) General Jurisprudence: Understanding Law from a Global Perspective, Cambridge University Press
- Twining, William (2009) Human Rights: Southern Voices (ed.) Cambridge University Press
- Twining, William (2010) How To Do Things With Rules (with David Miers, 4th edn., 1999; 5th edn forthcoming 2010)
- Twining, William (2009) “Implications of globalisation for law as a discipline” in A.Halpin and V. Roeben (eds.) Theorising the Global Order
- “Social Science and Diffusion of Law” Jo. Law and Society, 32: 203-40 (2005)
- “The Hutton Inquiry: Some Wider Legal Aspects” in W. G. Runciman (ed.) Hutton and Butler: Lifting the Lid on the Workings of Power (British Academy/ Oxford University Press, 2004)
- The Great Juristic Bazaar: Jurists' Texts and Lawyers' Stories (Ashgate, 2003)
- Globalisation and Legal Theory (2000)
- Karl Llewellyn and the Realist Movement (1973, 1985)
- Analysis of Evidence (2nd edition, with Terence Anderson and David Schum. Cambridge: Cambridge University Press, 2005)
- Rethinking Evidence (2nd edition, 2006)
- Evidence and Inference in History and Law (ed. with Iain Hampsher-Monk, Northwestern UP, 2003)
  - Legal education and legal scholarship
- “The Role of Academics in the Legal System” (UK) in P. Cane and M. Tushnet (eds) Oxford Handbook of Legal Studies (OUP, 2003) pp. 920–29.
- Law in Context: Enlarging a Discipline (1997)
- Blackstone's Tower: The English Law School, 1994 Hamlyn Lectures.
