= Leonard Sainer =

British solicitor and retailer

Leonard Sainer (12 October 1909 – 30 September 1991) enjoyed two very successful careers, as a solicitor and a retailer.

He attended the Central Foundation Boys' School. After education at University College London, he became a solicitor in 1933.

He was a founding partner of the firm of Titmuss Sainer and Webb in 1938. One of his previous clients, Charles Clore, had been so impressed by him that he transferred his legal work to the new firm. Sainer worked closely with Clore in developing his retail activities, eventually helping him to set up Sears plc.

Following the death of Titmuss, Sainer became senior partner and remained so until 1978, when he became a consultant. During this time, Titmuss Sainer and Webb had become one of the largest solicitor's firms in Great Britain, and was regarded as the best firm for retail property transactions. In 1978, Sainer succeeded Clore as Chairman of Sears plc. He retired in 1985, becoming its life president.

From 1964 to 1989, he was a trustee of the Clore Foundation.

The Leonard Sainer Trust was established by his will. It sponsors several charitable activities, such as the Leonard Sainer Centre in Ilford for children with special needs, and scholarships each year at the UCL Faculty of Laws.

== See also ==
- List of British Jews
