= Cheng Tien-hsi =

Chinese author, jurist, and ambassador

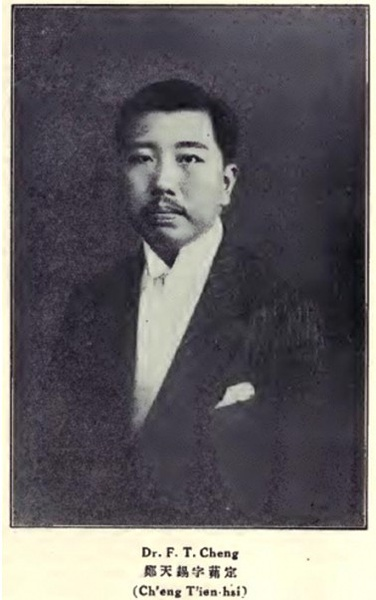
Cheng Tien-hsi (Who's Who in China 3rd ed., 1925)

Cheng Tien-hsi (simplified Chinese: 郑天锡; traditional Chinese: 鄭天錫; pinyin: Zhèng Tiānxí; Wade–Giles: Ch’eng T’ien-hsi; 10 July 1884 – 31 January 1970) was a Chinese author, jurist, and the last ambassador of the Republic of China to the United Kingdom. His courtesy name was "Futting" (茀定), so he was commonly known as F. T. Cheng.

== Early life and education ==
Cheng was born in Mawei, Fuzhou, Fujian, Qing dynasty, to parents from Zhongshan, Guangdong. His parents were living in Mawei at the time, where his father was employed in the ordnance factory there, but they had to evacuate to Hong Kong almost immediately after his birth because of the Sino-French War. He attended Queen's College, Hong Kong, and graduated from St. John's University, Shanghai.

Having sold the import-export business which he successfully started in Hong Kong, Cheng went to London, England, to study law in 1907. He graduated from University College London with the LL.B. (Hons.) degree in 1912 and acquired the LL.D. degree of the University of London in 1915, being the first Chinese to gain a doctorate in law in a British university. He won the Quain Prize in Public International Law at about the same time, and was also called to the English Bar.

== Early career ==
On his return to China, Cheng served from 1918 to 1927 in various legal capacities in the Beiyang government in Beijing, principally concerned with codification, trade mark, extraterritoriality and judicial reform, as technical expert of the Chinese Delegation to the Washington Naval Conference (1921), counsellor at the Ministry of Foreign Affairs, before becoming a judge of the Supreme Court of the Republic of China. He also taught law at several universities.

Cheng subsequently practised law in Shanghai from 1927 to 1932, the year when he acceded to the invitation of the Chinese Government to take up the post of Executive Vice-Minister and sometime Acting Minister of the Justice Ministry of the Republic of China, the capital of which had by then moved to Nanjing.

In 1935, he resigned and, while serving as an adviser in both the Justice Ministry and the Foreign Ministry, he was appointed by the Chinese Government as the Special Commissioner for the London International Exhibition of Chinese Art in England, which, as things turned out, provided a convenient excuse for moving the then most valuable treasures in the Forbidden City in Beijing to the south of China in order to escape the war that was then threatening and avoid being accused of being provocative. That was how a significant proportion of them ended up in the National Palace Museum in Taipei. Generally regarded as having been appointed for his integrity, he accompanied the treasures, escorted by a British warship, to England and back to China.

== Diplomatic career ==
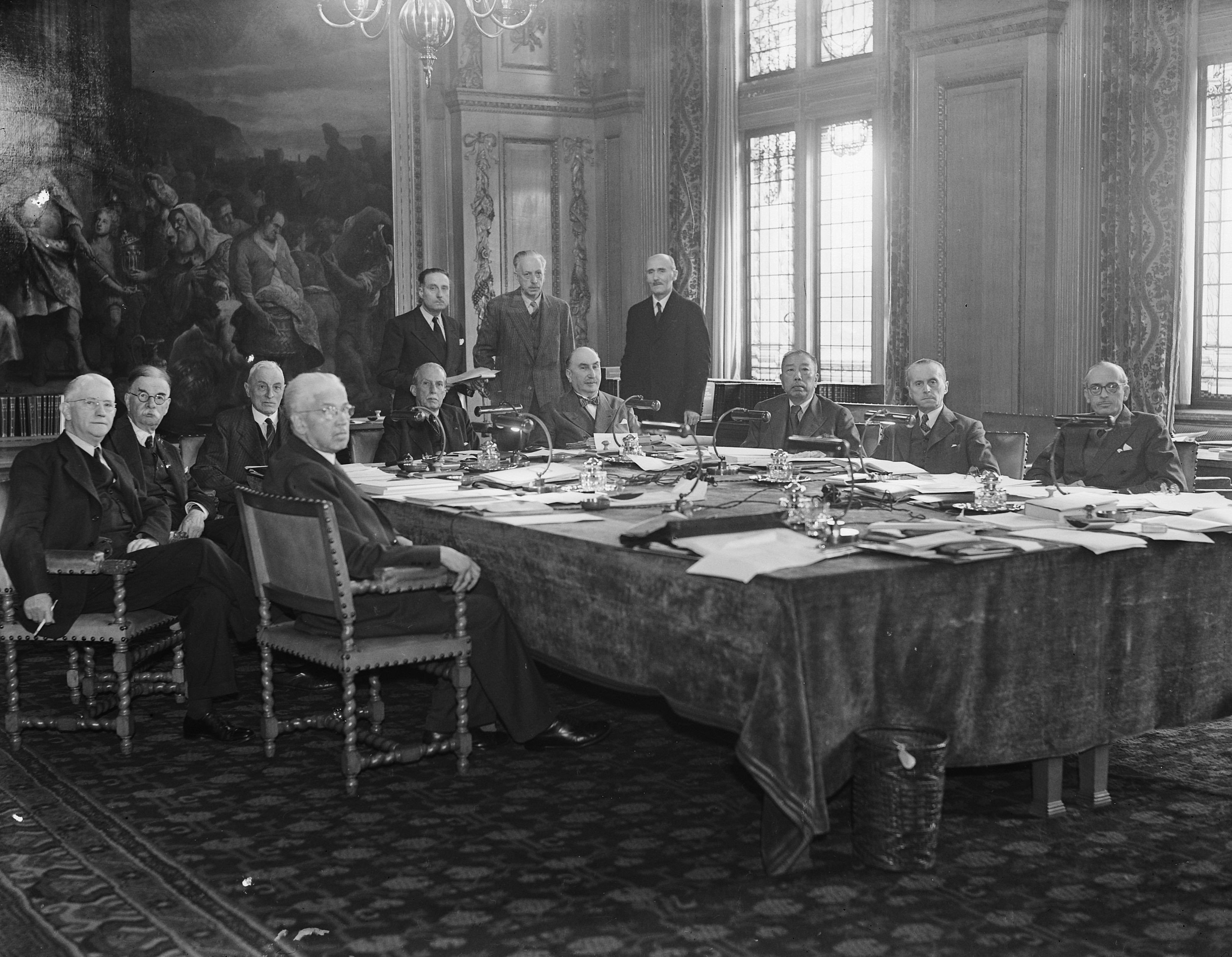
Cheng at the Permanent Court of International Justice (1945)

From 1936 to 1945, Cheng served as a judge of the Permanent Court of International Justice in The Hague, Netherlands, the work of which was cut short by the outbreak of World War II. He took part in all the cases that came before the court during the period when the court was functioning, and issued one separate opinion in which he agreed with the decision of the Court but for very different reasons. His opinions were highly regarded by his fellow judges, including the Italian jurist Dionisio Anzilotti.

When the Permanent Court of International Justice was being replaced by the United Nations with the International Court of Justice, Cheng was nominated by more than one government, but his own government had other plans for him, and he accordingly withdrew his name from the election of judges.

From 1946 to 1950, Cheng served as the last ambassador of the Republic of China to the United Kingdom when Britain was under a Labour government.

After 1950, Cheng lived first in New York and later in London, and continued to serve as a member of the United Nations Panel for Inquiry and Conciliation, and on the Panel of Arbitrators of the Permanent Court of Arbitration, in The Hague, Netherlands, as well as an adviser of the Justice Ministry of the Republic of China, until his death in London in 1970.

== Honors ==
In 1936, Cheng was decorated by the government of the Republic of China with the Order of Brilliant Jade, Class Two, with Grand Cordon, and elected a Fellow of University College London. In 1946, he was elected an Honorary Bencher of the Middle Temple.

== Family ==
Cheng had three daughters, Kum-wan, Ying-wan and Ching-wan, and three sons, Bin, Ben and Hung. Bin Cheng was a renowned legal scholar who served as Dean of the University College London Faculty of Laws.

== Writings ==
Cheng wrote a number of books, including Rules of Private International Law Determining Capacity to Contract (London, Stevens, 1919), China Moulded by Confucius (London, Stevens, 1947), which was translated into French, German and Czech, East and West: Episodes in a Sixty Years’ Journey (London, Hutchinson, 1951), Musings of a Chinese Gourmet (London, Hutchinson, 1954), and Reflections at Eighty (London, Luzac, 1966). He also edited and translated from Chinese into English: Judgments of the High Prize Court of the Republic of China (Peking, High Prize Court, 1919), Chinese Supreme Court Decisions relating to General Principles of Civil Law, Obligations, and Commercial Law (Peking, Commission of Extra-Territoriality, 1923. Reprinted by University Publications of America, Inc., Washington D.C., 1976), as well as numerous articles.

== Literature ==
- Cheng Tien-Hsi, East and West: Episodes in a Sixty Years’ Journey (London, Hutchinson, 1951)
- 袁道豐﹕〃與海外耆宿鄭天錫博士話生平〃(“Conversation with the Octogenarian Dr Cheng Tien-Hsi About his Life”)，東方雜誌3卷, 4 期( 3 (4) Dong Fang Za Zhi) (1969), 78–84; 5期 (3 (5) id.) (1969), 83-88
- 楊孔鑫﹕〃追念鄭天錫先生〃(“In Memoriam - Cheng Tien-Hsi”)，傳記文學18 卷（18 Zhuan Ji Wen Xue）（1971）
- 陳堯聖﹕ 〃鄭天錫大使與倫敦國際中國藝展〃(“Ambassador Cheng Tien-Hsi and the London International Exhibition of Chinese Art”)，傳記文學19卷（19 Zhuan Ji Wen Xue）(1971), 21-27
- 孫 甄陶(Sun Zhen Tao). 〃中山縣籍的三位外交使節〃 (“Zhongshan District's Three Diplomatic Envoys”, 大成 ，23 期 (23 Da Cheng) (1975), 24, at 28-31
- Biographical Notes concerning Members of the Court. Mr. Cheng Tien-Hsi, Member of the Court. In: Thirteenth Annual Report of the Permanent Court of International Justice. A.W. Sijthoff's Publishing, Leiden 1937, S. 23/24
- Warren F. Kuehl: Cheng Tien-hsi. In: Warren F. Kuehl (Hrsg.): Biographical Dictionary of Internationalists. Greenwood Press, Westport 1983, ISBN 0-313-22129-4, S. 151/152
