= Eric Barendt =

British academic

Eric M. Barendt is the Goodman Professor of Media Law at University College London.

== Biography ==
After graduating with a BCL and an MA degree at Oxford, Barendt was called to the Bar at Gray's Inn. He began lecturing in law as a fellow at St Catherine's College, Oxford in 1971. In 1990 he left Oxford to take up a position as Goodman Professor of Media Law at University College London, the first media law professorship in the United Kingdom. He also teaches jurisprudence at the undergraduate level. He has been a visiting professor at Sapienza University of Rome, the University of Siena, the University of Melbourne, and Panthéon-Assas University.

== Writings ==
- Freedom of Speech, 2nd ed., 2005, ISBN 978-0199244515
- Academic Freedom and the Law: A Comparative Study, 2010, ISBN 978-1841136943
