= Ralph Wilde =

Academic and expert in public international law

Ralph Wilde is an academic with expertise in public international law. He is a faculty member at University College London (UCL). His 2008 book International Territorial Administration: How Trusteeship and The Civilizing Mission Never Went Away — examining international territorial administration in consideration of Third World approaches to international law and postcolonial theory — was published by Oxford University Press.

== Education ==
- 1995 Bachelor of Science London School of Economics
- 1996 Diploma University of London
- 1998 European Human Rights Law from the European University Institute
- 1999 Master of Laws from Cambridge University
- 2000 Master of Arts University of London
- 2003 Ph.D. in law Cambridge University

== Career ==
In 2002 Wilde became a member of University College London Faculty of Laws. He is a public law expert, specializing in international law. He also studies "human rights beyond borders". He has published many papers regarding international law and human rights.

He won an award for his 2008 book, International Territorial Administration: How Trusteeship and The Civilizing Mission Never Went Away. In 2009 he was awarded the Certificate of Merit from the American Society of International Law.
