= Jeffrey Jowell =

British legal scholar and barrister

Sir Jeffrey Jowell KCMG KC (Hon)
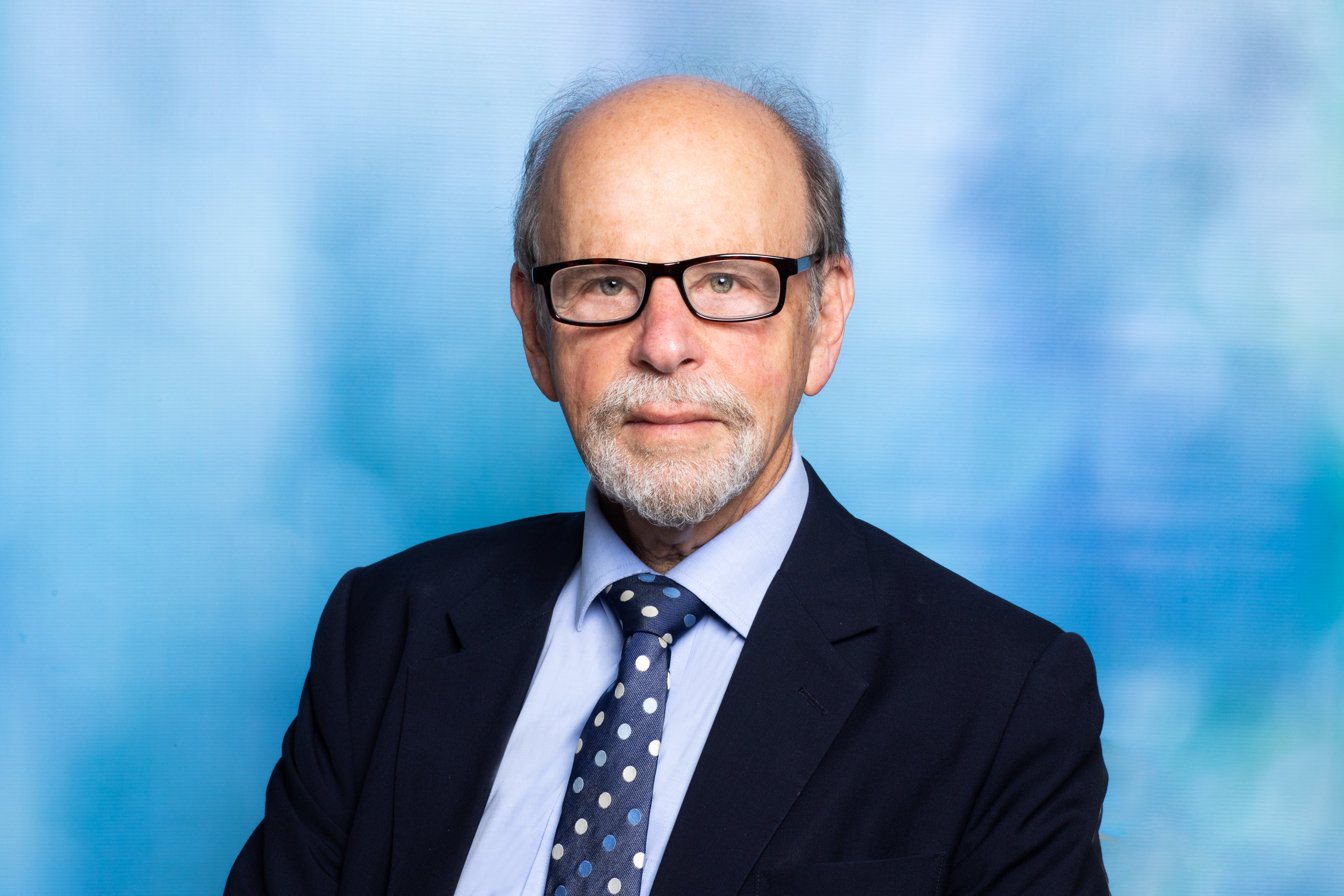
- Jowell in 2021
- Born: Jeffrey Lionel Jowell; 4 November 1938 (age 87); Cape Town, South Africa
- Education: University of Cape Town; Hertford College, Oxford; Harvard Law School
- Occupations: Barrister; legal academic
- Known for: Public law, constitutional law and the rule of law
- Title: Emeritus Professor of Public Law, University College London
- Spouse: Frances Barbara Suzman (m. 1963)
- Children: 2
- Relatives: Helen Suzman (mother-in-law) Sir Roger Jowell (brother)
- Awards: Knight Commander of the Order of St Michael and St George (2011); Commander of the National Order of the Southern Cross (2016); Member of the American Academy of Arts and Sciences (2020)
- Website: https://www.blackstonechambers.com/barristers/sir-jeffrey-jowell-kc-hon/

Sir Jeffrey Jowell (born 1938) is a British legal scholar and barrister specialising in public law, constitutional law, human rights and the rule of law. He is a practising barrister at Blackstone Chambers and Emeritus Professor of Public Law at University College London (UCL), where he was Dean of the Faculty of Laws and a Vice-Provost. From December 2010 to October 2015 he was the founding director of the Bingham Centre for the Rule of Law.

Jowell has written on administrative law, judicial review, constitutional principles, equality and the rule of law. His publications include de Smith's Judicial Review and The Changing Constitution. From 2000 to 2011 he was the United Kingdom member of the Council of Europe's Venice Commission. He has advised on constitutional and public-law issues in several jurisdictions, including British Overseas Territories and Crown Dependencies.

Jowell was appointed Knight Commander of the Order of St Michael and St George in the 2011 Birthday Honours for services to human rights, democracy and the rule of law. He received the rank of Commander of Brazil's National Order of the Southern Cross in 2016 and was elected to the American Academy of Arts and Sciences in 2020.

== Early life and education ==
Jowell was born on 4 November 1938 in Cape Town, South Africa, the son of Jack and Emily Jowell. He studied at the University of Cape Town, graduating BA and LLB in 1961, before studying at Hertford College, Oxford, where he received a BA in 1963 and MA in 1969 and was president of the Oxford Union in 1963.

== Personal life ==
In 1963, Jowell married Frances Barbara Suzman, daughter of Moses Suzman and Helen Suzman. They have one son and one daughter. His younger brother, Sir Roger Jowell, was a social statistician.

== Career ==
Jowell's professional career includes a mix of academic scholarship, academic and other administration, and practice as a barrister and constitutional advisor. He is a member of Blackstone Chambers in London.

Jowell was called to the Bar by Middle Temple in 1965, became an honorary Bencher in 1999 and a Bencher in 2013.

After research posts at Harvard Law School and the Joint Center for Urban Studies of Harvard University and MIT, he was Associate Professor of Law and Administrative Studies at Osgoode Hall Law School from 1968 to 1972. He then held a Leverhulme Fellowship in Urban Legal Studies at the London School of Economics from 1972 to 1974 and was a lecturer in law there from 1974 to 1975.

At University College London, Jowell was Professor of Public Law from 1975 to 2006 and Professor of Law from 2006 to 2010. He served as Dean of the Faculty of Laws from 1979 to 1989 and from 1998 to 2002, Head of Department from 1982 to 1989 and from 1998 to 2002, and Vice-Provost from 1992 to 1999.

In 2010 Jowell was appointed the inaugural Director of the Bingham Centre for the Rule of Law, which soon established itself as a significant centre for the study and promotion of the rule of law, considering issues such as devolution, closed trials, schools programmes, immigrants’ rights, the rule of law in Parliament etc. The Centre also worked on rule of law matters abroad, in countries such as Myanmar, Bahrain and Turkey.

As one of a small number of experts on the drafting of national constitutions, he has been involved in the constitutions of South Africa, the Cayman Islands, the Maldives, Sri Lanka, Georgia, the Gambia and elsewhere. He has regularly advised on the constitutions of a number of British Overseas Territories and Crown Dependencies. As the UK’s member on the Venice Commission (the Council of Europe’s Commission for Democracy Through Law) he advised on the constitutions and public law of a number of countries in Central and Eastern Europe and the Balkans, chairing the committee which produced the Commission’s influential document on The Rule of Law.

== Scholarship ==
Jowell's scholarship has focused on public law, administrative law, equality and the rule of law. An early article argued for legislation against racial and religious discrimination in the United Kingdom, before comprehensive statutory protection had been enacted. The article also addressed how such legislation should be enforced, favouring institutional and civil mechanisms rather than a primarily criminal-law approach.

A second strand of his work concerned judicial control of administrative discretion. Jowell argued against the view that decisions affecting welfare and other administrative benefits should be largely insulated from legal challenge, and examined the institutional conditions needed for effective administrative justice.[3]

Jowell also wrote on the intensity of judicial review, including the extent to which courts may review the substance of administrative decisions rather than merely the procedure by which they are reached. His work in this area addressed concepts such as unreasonableness, proportionality and judicial deference.[4][5]

Following his involvement in constitutional drafting processes, including in South Africa, Jowell's later work examined the constitutional status of principles such as equality and the rule of law. He argued that such principles may have a place within the United Kingdom's uncodified constitution and within constitutional democracy more generally.[6][7][8]

In 1993, Jowell, Lord Woolf and Andrew Le Sueur became editors de Smith's Judicial Review, a practitioners' and academic text on judicial review with origins in Stanley de Smith’s pathbreaking 1958 PhD. He remained associated with the work through later editions.[9][10]

=== Scholarship ===
Jowell’s principal work can be divided into four strands. His first published paper made the case for a statute against racial and religious discrimination at a time when the UK had none. That paper (which influenced the campaign to introduce anti-discrimination laws in the mid-sixties) also dealt with the institutional means to achieve the most effective implementation of such laws (rejecting a criminal approach).

This interest in institutional design led to his second major area of interest, the merits and demerits of judicial control of administrative discretion, challenging the widely held view at that time that such as welfare recipients needed no right to challenge decisions to grant or refuse their benefits.

He then turned to a third issue, neglected at the time, of the extent to which judges could interfere with the substance of, rather than the procedure by which, decisions are made by public bodies (under the notions of ‘unreasonableness’ and ‘proportionality’) This was followed by work on the related issue of ‘judicial deference’ more generally.

After his involvement in the drafting process of the South African constitution, he turned to a fourth issue: the extent to which certain principles or rights are implied in the UK’s uncodified constitution, and in particular, whether the principles of equality and the rule of law are inherent components of the UK's constitution, and indeed of any constitutional democracy.

In 1993, Jowell joined Lord Woolf and Andrew Le Sueur as editors of the academic and practitioner text de Smith’s Judicial Review (then in its third edition, now in its eighth)

== Selected publications ==
- Law and Bureaucracy (1975)
- Welfare Law and Policy (joint editor, 1979)
- Lord Denning: The Judge and the Law (joint editor, 1984)
- The Changing Constitution (joint editor, first published 1985; 9th edn 2019)
- New Directions in Judicial Review (joint editor, 1988)
- de Smith's Judicial Review (with Lord Woolf, Andrew Le Sueur, and others; 5th edn 1995 to 8th edn 2018)
- Principles of Judicial Review (joint editor, 1999)
- Understanding Human Rights Principles (joint editor, 2001)
- Delivering Rights (joint editor, 2003)
