= Melissa Terras =

British academic

Melissa M. Terras MBE FRSE FREng FSA
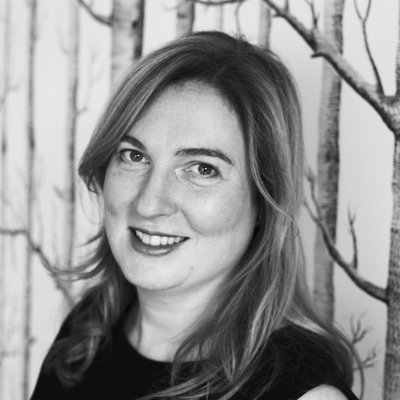
- Professor Melissa Terras
- Born: 1975 (age 50–51); Kirkcaldy, Scotland
- Occupation: Academic
- Title: Professor

Academic background
- Education: MA, MSc, DPhil, CLTHE
- Alma mater: University of Glasgow; University of Oxford
- Thesis: Image to interpretation: towards an intelligent system to aid historians in the reading of the Vindolanda texts (2003)
- Doctoral advisor: J. Michael Brady; Alan K. Bowman

Academic work
- Discipline: Digital Humanities
- Institutions: University College London; University of Edinburgh
- Website: https://melissaterras.org

Melissa Mhairi Terras MBE FRSE FREng FSA (born 1975) is a British scholar of Digital Humanities. Since 2017, she has been Professor of Digital Cultural Heritage at the University of Edinburgh, and director of its Centre for Digital Scholarship. She previously taught at University College London, where she was Professor of Digital Humanities and served as director of its Centre for Digital Humanities from 2012 to 2017: she remains an honorary professor. She has a wide ranging academic background: she has an undergraduate degree in art history and English literature, then took a Master of Science (MSc) degree in computer science, before undertaking a Doctor of Philosophy (DPhil) degree at the University of Oxford in engineering.

== Early life and education ==
Terras was born in 1975 in Kirkcaldy, Scotland. She studied classical art history and English literature at the University of Glasgow. She was given the opportunity to hand in her dissertation as a website, and, after learning to code, did so in 1996. She graduated with an undergraduate Master of Arts (MA Hons) degree in 1997. She was then awarded a Scottish Government scholarship to undertake a master's degree in computer science. She studied software and systems at the University of Glasgow, graduating with a Master of Science (MSc) degree. Her master's thesis was supervised by Seamus Ross, and was a virtual reality model (in VRML 2.0) of the tomb of Sennedjem.

Terras then moved to the University of Oxford, where she had funding via the Engineering and Physical Sciences Research Council (EPSRC) to undertake a doctorate in engineering: she was based jointly in Oxford's Department of Engineering Science and the Centre for the Study of Ancient Documents. The project was concerned with using "image processing and artificial intelligence to help read Ancient documents" (specifically the Vindolanda tablets). Her thesis was titled "Image to interpretation: towards an intelligent system to aid historians in the reading of the Vindolanda texts", and was successfully submitted for her Doctor of Philosophy (DPhil) degree in 2002.

== Academic career ==
In August 2003, Terras joined University College London (UCL) as a lecturer in electronic communication and publishing and was based in the School of Library, Archive, and Information Studies. In 2010, she was promoted to Reader in Electronic Communication. She co-founded the UCL Centre for Digital Humanities and served as its director from 2012 to 2017. Since leaving UCL, she has maintained her links with the university as an honorary professor.

In October 2017, Terras moved to the University of Edinburgh, having been appointed Professor of Digital Cultural Heritage in its School of History, Classics and Archaeology. She was also a Fellow of the Alan Turing Institute between 2018 and 2020.

Terras's research is focused on the intersection between computing and the humanities, particularly the use of computational techniques in arts and humanities research. Among the collaborations that she has been involved in is Transcribe Bentham, a crowdsourcing project in which volunteers help to transcribe the writings of Jeremy Bentham: the wiki went live in 2010. From 2015 to 2017, she was co-leader of a project analysing Egyptian mummy cases by non-destructive means (via digital imaging technology): the aim was to be able to read the papyrus that makes up a mummy's cartonnage.

On 20 July 2023, she was elected a Fellow of the Society of Antiquaries of London (FSA).

In 2024, she was elected a fellow of the Royal Academy of Engineering and she was appointed MBE in the 2025 New Year Honours for services to digital humanities. In 2026, Terras was elected a Fellow of the Royal Society of Edinburgh, in the discipline of engineering.

== Selected works ==
- Terras, Melissa M. (2006). Image to interpretation: an intelligent system to aid historians in reading the Vindolanda texts. Oxford: Oxford University Press. ISBN 9780199204557.
- Terras, Melissa M. (2008). Digital images for the information professional. Aldershot, England: Ashgate. ISBN 9780754648604.
- Ross, C.; Terras, M.; Warwick, C.; Welsh, A. (8 March 2011). "Enabled backchannel: conference Twitter use by digital humanists" (PDF). Journal of Documentation. 67 (2): 214–237. doi:10.1108/00220411111109449. hdl:20.500.11820/20129043-9ba5-4c81-b537-231ca22a49ae.
- Warwick, Claire; Terras, Melissa; Nyhan, Julianne, eds. (2012). Digital humanities in practice. London: Facet Publishing. ISBN 9781856047661.
- Williams, Shirley A.; Terras, Melissa M.; Warwick, Claire (10 May 2013). "What do people study when they study Twitter? Classifying Twitter related academic papers" (PDF). Journal of Documentation. 69 (3): 384–410. doi:10.1108/JD-03-2012-0027. ISSN 0022-0418. S2CID 18581291.
- Terras, Melissa; Nyhan, Julianne; Vanhoutte, Edward, eds. (2016). Defining digital humanities: a reader. Farnham, Surrey: Routledge. ISBN 9781317153580.
