= Transcribe Bentham =

Crowdsourced manuscript transcription project

- Website type: Crowdsourced transcription project
- Available in: English, French, Latin, Greek
- Owner: Transcribe Bentham team
- Creator: Transcribe Bentham team
- Website: http://www.ucl.ac.uk/transcribe-bentham
- Commercial: No
- Registration: Yes
- Launched: 8 September 2010
- Current status: Ongoing

Transcribe Bentham is a crowdsourced manuscript transcription project, run by University College London's Bentham Project, in partnership with UCL Centre for Digital Humanities, UCL Library Services, UCL Learning and Media Services, the University of London Computer Centre, and the online community. Transcribe Bentham was launched under a twelve-month Arts and Humanities Research Council grant.

For two years from October 2012, the project was funded by a grant from the Andrew W. Mellon Foundation's 'Scholarly Communications' programme, and the project consortium has been expanded to include the British Library.

== Rationale ==
Transcribe Bentham was launched in September 2010. The project makes available, via a transcription interface based on a customised MediaWiki, high-quality digital images of UCL's vast collection of unpublished manuscripts written and composed by the philosopher and reformer, Jeremy Bentham, which runs to some 85,000 manuscript pages (an estimated 30,000,000 words). Under the Mellon Foundation grant, the remainder of the UCL Bentham Papers were digitised, along with all of the British Library's own collection of Bentham manuscripts, some 15,000 manuscript pages (or an estimated 6,000,000 words).

The project recruits volunteers to assist in transcribing the material, and thereby contribute to the Bentham Project's production of the new edition of The Collected Works of Jeremy Bentham. Volunteer-produced transcripts are also uploaded to UCL's digital Bentham Papers repository, in order to widen access to the collection, and ensure its long-term preservation.

== Transcription ==
Volunteers can sign-up for a user account at the Transcription Desk. Once registered, they are given transcriber privileges. The volunteer then selects a manuscript, and is presented with a manuscript image alongside a free-text box, into which he or she enters their transcript (which can be saved at any time). Volunteers are also asked to add some basic formatting to their transcripts, and encode their work in Text-Encoding Initiative-compliant XML using a specially designed transcription toolbar. Using this, the volunteer can highlight a piece of text, or a position in the text, and click a button on the toolbar to identify a particular characteristic of that chosen portion. These include line breaks, paragraphs, unusual spellings, and frequent additions, deletions and marginalia present in the manuscripts.

When a volunteer is happy with his or her transcript, it is submitted to Transcribe Bentham project staff for checking. Changes are made to the text and code, if necessary, and staff decide whether or not the transcript has been completed to a satisfactory degree for uploading to the digital repository. If it is decided that no further appreciable improvements can be made, the transcript is locked for further editing and converted to an XML file. However, if staff decide that a submitted transcript is incomplete - i.e. if it is partially transcribed, or there are a number of missing or unclear words - then it will remain unlocked for further crowdsourcing.

Work is currently ongoing to make improvements and modifications to the transcription interface.

As of November 2026, volunteers had transcribed or partially transcribed over 45,000 manuscript pages, of which 94% were of the required standard to form a basis for editorial work, and to be uploaded to the digital repository.

== Media coverage and prizes ==
The work of Transcribe Bentham has been reported upon by the international media. This coverage includes a feature article in The New York Times, The Sunday Times, The Chronicle of Higher Education, Deutsche Welle World radio, and Austria's ORF1 radio.

In September 2011, Transcribe Bentham was honoured with an Award of Distinction in the Digital Communities category of the Prix Ars Electronica, the world's foremost digital arts competition. In its report, the Digital Communities jury noted that the Transcribe Bentham transcription interface has 'the potential to become a standard tool for scholarly crowdsourcing projects', and that Transcribe Bentham as a whole has the 'potential to create the legacy of participatory education and the preservation of heritage or an endangered culture'.

Transcribe Bentham was also nominated for the 2011 Digital Heritage Award, along with:

- the National Library of Finland's DigitalKoot
- Old Weather
- the United States Holocaust Memorial Museum's Remember Me
- the National Library of Australia's Trove

In November 2012, Transcribe Bentham came second in the Knetworks 'Platforms for Networked Innovation Competition', which sought to identify the 'most innovative web-based platform enabling regional innovation for public, private or research organizations'.

Transcribe Bentham was featured on BBC Radio 4's PM programme and the BBC News website on 27 August 2013. The report discussed how volunteers transcribed a series of recipes which were collated for Bentham's proposed panopticon prison, and how one - a 'Devonshire Pie' consisting of potatoes, tripe, onions, spleen, lungs, and gooseberries - was made by the Michelin-starred St John Smithfield restaurant. The recipes were published in 2014 as Jeremy Bentham's Prison Cooking: A Collection of Utilitarian Recipes.

== Open-source code ==
The code for Transcribe Bentham's MediaWiki-based transcription interface is available for reuse and customisation, on an open source basis. It has been implemented by the Public Record Office Victoria for their pilot transcription project.
