= An Introduction to the Principles of Morals and Legislation =

Philosophical work by Jeremy Bentham (1789)

- Author: Jeremy Bentham
- Language: English
- Subject: Philosophy
- Publication date: 1789

An Introduction to the Principles of Morals and Legislation is a book by the English philosopher and legal theorist Jeremy Bentham "originally printed in 1780, and first published in 1789." Bentham's "most important theoretical work," it is where Bentham develops his theory of utilitarianism and is the first major book on the topic.

== Overview ==
Bentham was the first major philosopher to develop and defend a utilitarian theory of ethics. Like John Stuart Mill, whom he greatly influenced, Bentham believed that happiness or pleasure is the only thing that is good for its own sake. He believed that humans, by nature, are motivated exclusively by the desire for pleasure (a view known as psychological hedonism), and that ethically they should seek to maximize pleasure (a view known as "ethical hedonism"). In The Principles of Morals and Legislation, Bentham seeks to determine what a system of laws would look like if it was constructed on a purely utilitarian basis. To that end, Bentham offers painstaking analyses of the various kinds of pleasures and pains, the sources of pleasures and pains, how pleasures and pains should be measured, the morally and legally relevant components of human actions, the negative consequences of harmful acts, types of behavior that are "unmeet" for punishment, and the various classes of offences.

The book contains several of Bentham's most best-known quotations. In Chapter 1, "Of the Principle of Utility," Bentham describes how actions are motivated by the desire for pleasure and are right insofar as they create utility or happiness: "Nature has placed mankind under the governance of two sovereign masters, pain and pleasure. It is for them alone to point out what we ought to do, as well as to determine what we shall do."

Chapter 17, "Of the Limits of the Penal Branch of Jurisprudence," also contains an early endorsement of the idea that the interests of animals may matter morally:

"The day has been, I grieve to say in many places it is not yet past, in which the greater part of the species, under the denomination of slaves, have been treated by the law exactly upon the same footing as, in England for example, the inferior races of animals are still. The day may come when the rest of the animal creation may acquire those rights which never could have been withholden from them but by the hand of tyranny. The French have already discovered that the blackness of the skin is no reason why a human being should be abandoned without redress to the caprice of a tormentor. It may one day come to be recognized that the number of legs, the villosity of the skin, or the termination of the os sacrum are reasons equally insufficient for abandoning a sensitive being to the same fate. What else is it that should trace the insuperable line? Is it the faculty of reason, or perhaps the faculty of discourse? But a full-grown horse or dog is beyond comparison a more rational, as well as a more conversable animal, than an infant of a day or a week or even a month, old. But suppose they were otherwise, what would it avail? The question is not Can they reason? nor Can they talk? but, Can they suffer?

The Introduction also contains Bentham's famous discussion of the "felicific (or hedonic) calculus"—his proposed method for determining which future course of action would produce the greatest net amount of pleasure over pain. According to Bentham, seven factors should be considered in weighing the value of a pleasure or pain: its intensity, its duration, its degree of certainty, its propinquity or remoteness, its fecundity (i.e., its tendency to produce further pleasures or pains), its purity (i.e., whether it is purely pleasurable or painful, or is mixed with its opposite), and its extent (i.e., the number of persons to whom it extends).
