= Push-pin (game) =

English child's game

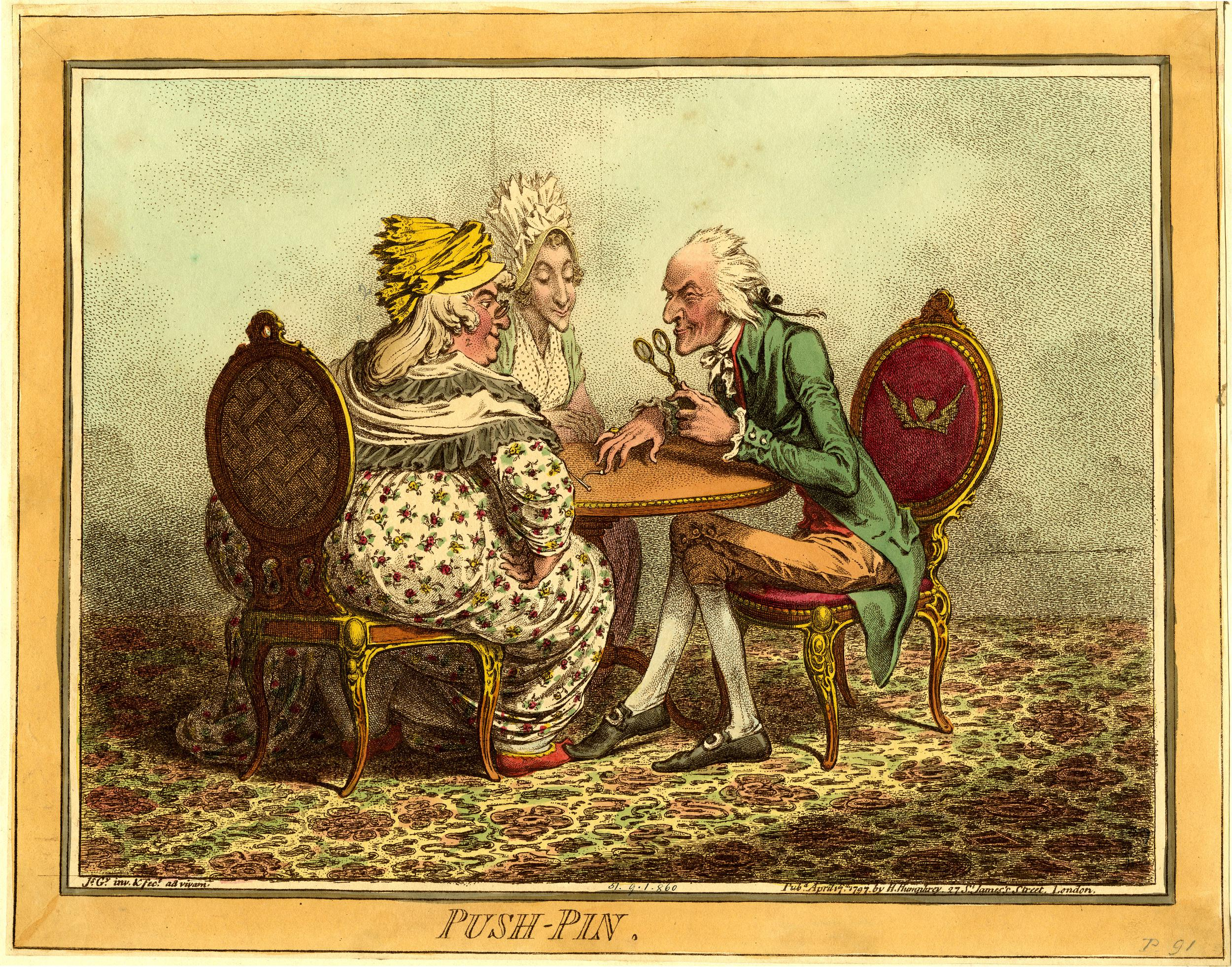
1797 James Gillray cartoon depicting push-pin

Push-pin was an English child's game played from the 16th until the 19th centuries. It is also known as "put-pin", and it is similar to Scottish games called "Hattie" and "Pop the Bonnet". In philosophy it has been used as an example of a relatively worthless form of amusement.

== Rules ==
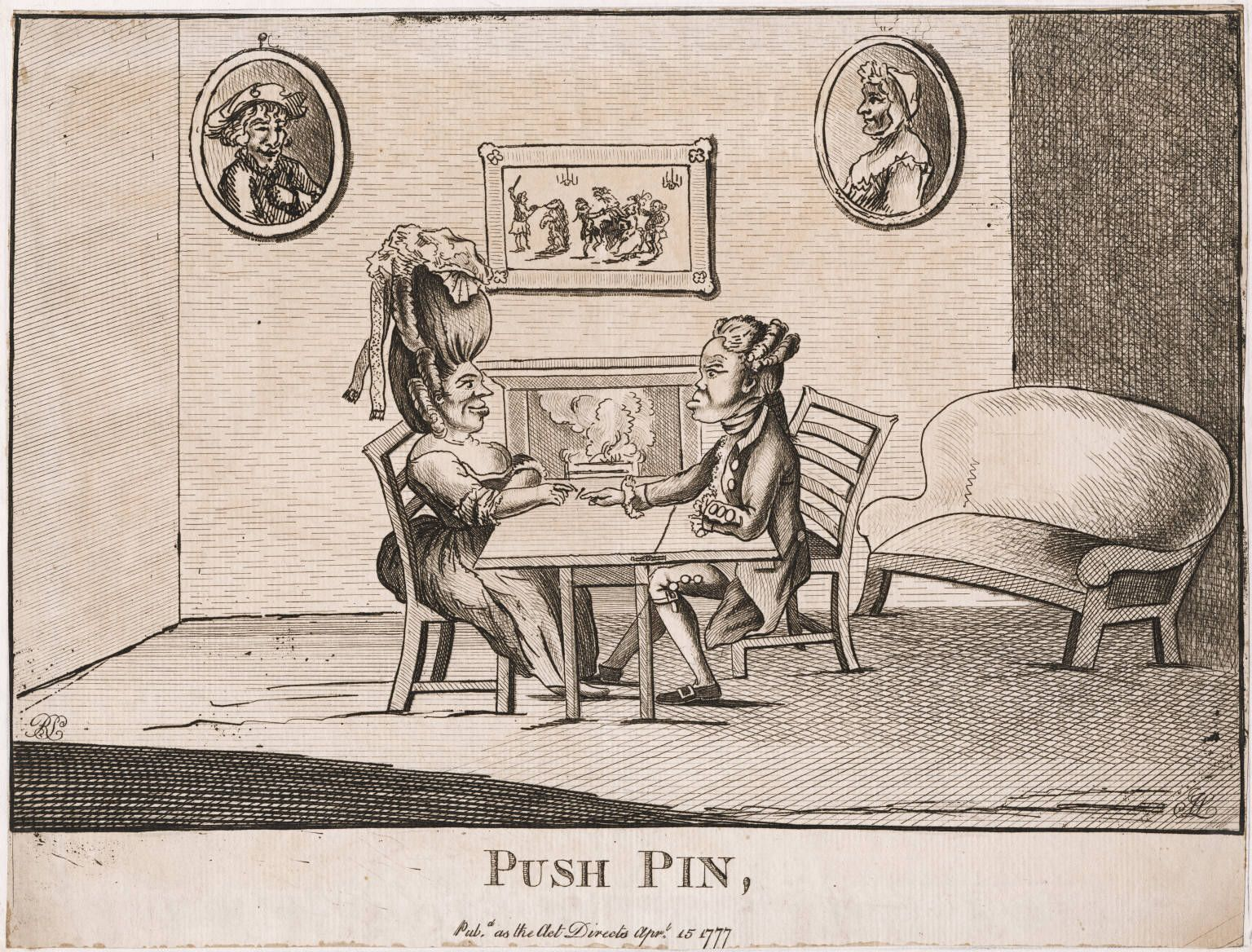
1777 etching depicting a couple playing a game of push-pin

In push-pin each player sets one pin on a table and then tries to push his pin across his opponent's pin. The game is played by two or more players.

In "Pop the Bonnet", or "hattie", players place two pins on the brim of a hat. They take turns tapping or "popping" on the sides of the hat trying to cause pins to cross one another. Whichever player causes them to cross takes the pins. This was a form of gambling, where a player could win or lose their pins, which were valuable as a rare imported commodity at that time.

Boys and men might stash several pins on a sleeve or lapel to be prepared to play.

== References in philosophy ==
Push-pin was immortalized by Jeremy Bentham when he wrote in The Rationale of Reward that: "Prejudice apart, the game of push-pin is of equal value with the arts and sciences of music and poetry." John Stuart Mill, who disagreed with Bentham on this point, misquotes Bentham as saying, "quantity of pleasure being equal, push-pin is as good as poetry". Mill's version is now widely attributed to Bentham.

The phrase comes up often in the work of R. S. Peters, a British philosopher of education, who uses some version of the phrase "why poetry is preferable to push-pin" as a way of drawing attention to the question of what is educationally worthwhile. For Peters, only intrinsically worthwhile activities warrant inclusion into the school curriculum. If a case could be made for the intrinsic educational value of push-pin (or a similar pastime), it could warrant inclusion. See for example "The Philosopher's Contribution to Educational Research", Educational Philosophy and Theory 1 (2), October 1969, page 3.

== See also ==
- Gammer Gurton's Needle
