= Jeremy Bentham =

English philosopher and jurist (1748–1832)

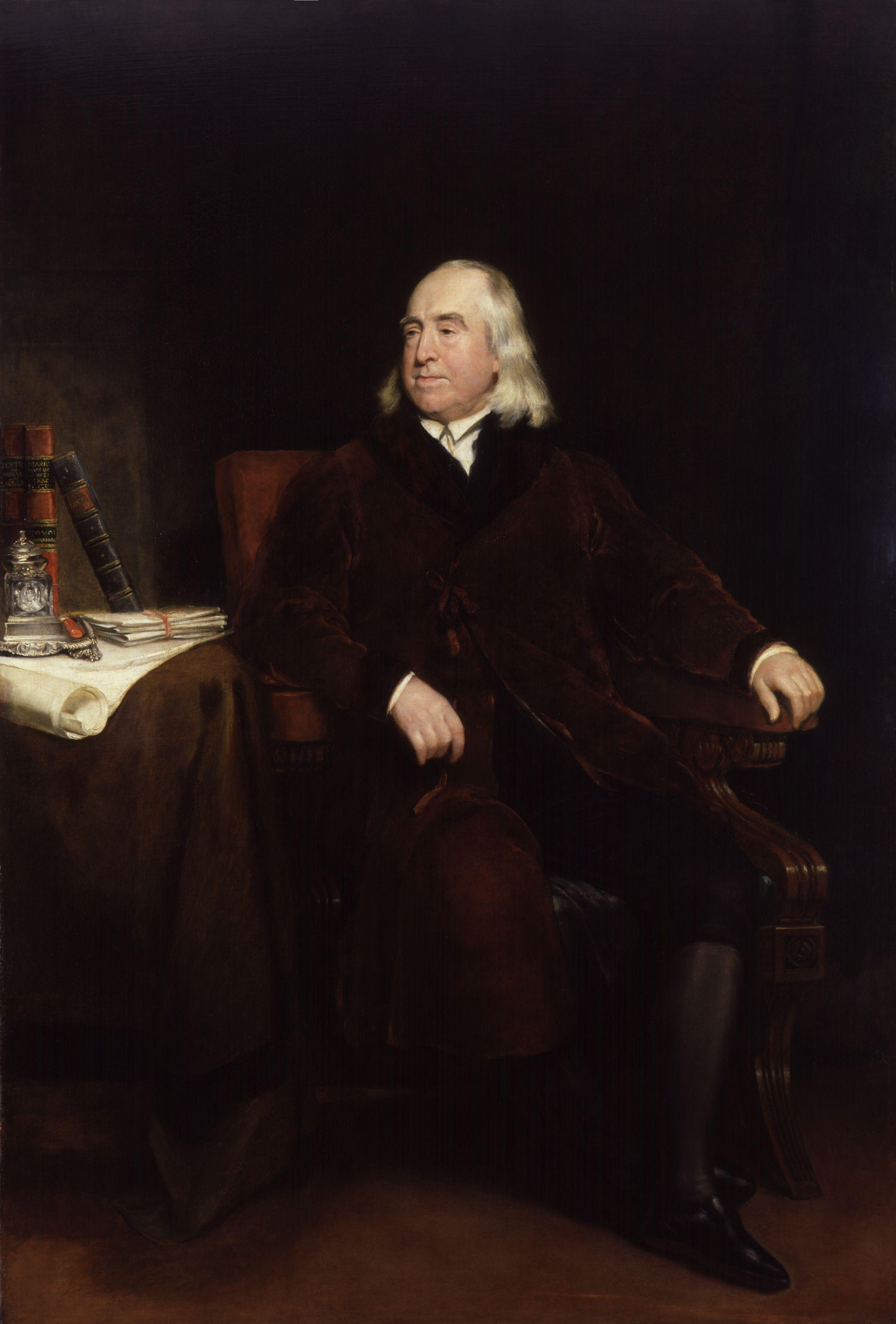
- Portrait by Henry William Pickersgill, 1828
- Born: 15 February 1748 [O.S. 4 February 1747/8] London, England
- Died: 6 June 1832 (aged 84); London, England

Education
- Education: The Queen's College, Oxford (BA, 1763; MA, 1766)

Philosophical work
- Era: 18th-/19th-century philosophy
- Region: Western philosophy
- School: Utilitarianism; Radicalism; Liberalism; Legal positivism Epicureanism
- Notable students: William Thompson (epistolary correspondent)
- Main interests: Economics · ethics · philosophy of law · political philosophy
- Notable ideas: Felicific calculus Principle of utility

Jeremy Bentham (/ˈbɛnθəm/; 4 February 1747/8 O.S. [15 February 1748 N.S.] – 6 June 1832) was an English philosopher, jurist, and social reformer regarded as the founder of modern utilitarianism.

Bentham defined as the "fundamental axiom" of his philosophy the principle that "it is the greatest happiness of the greatest number that is the measure of right and wrong". He became a leading theorist in Anglo-American philosophy of law, and a political radical whose ideas influenced the development of welfarism. He advocated individual and economic freedoms, the separation of church and state, freedom of expression, equal rights for women, the right to divorce, and (in an unpublished essay) the decriminalizing of homosexual acts. He called for the abolition of slavery, and the abolition of capital punishment and physical punishment, including that of children. He has also become known as an early advocate of animal rights. Though strongly in favour of the extension of individual legal rights, he opposed the idea of natural law and natural rights (both of which are considered "divine" or "God-given" in origin), calling them "nonsense upon stilts". However, he viewed the Magna Carta as important, citing it to argue that the treatment of convicts in Australia was unlawful. Bentham was also a sharp critic of legal fictions.

Bentham's students included his secretary and collaborator James Mill, the latter's son, John Stuart Mill, the legal philosopher John Austin and American writer and activist John Neal. He "had considerable influence on the reform of prisons, schools, poor laws, law courts, and Parliament itself."

On his death in 1832, Bentham left instructions for his body to be first dissected and then to be permanently preserved as an "auto-icon" (or self-image), which would be his memorial. This was done, and the auto-icon is now on public display in the entrance of the Student Centre at University College London (UCL). Although he has been described as the "spiritual founder" of UCL due to his advocacy for the general availability of education, his direct involvement in the university's founding was limited.

Bentham is famous for his book An Introduction to the Principles of Morals and Legislation (1789), which presents his theory of utilitarianism and which is the first major book on the topic.

== Biography ==
=== Early life ===
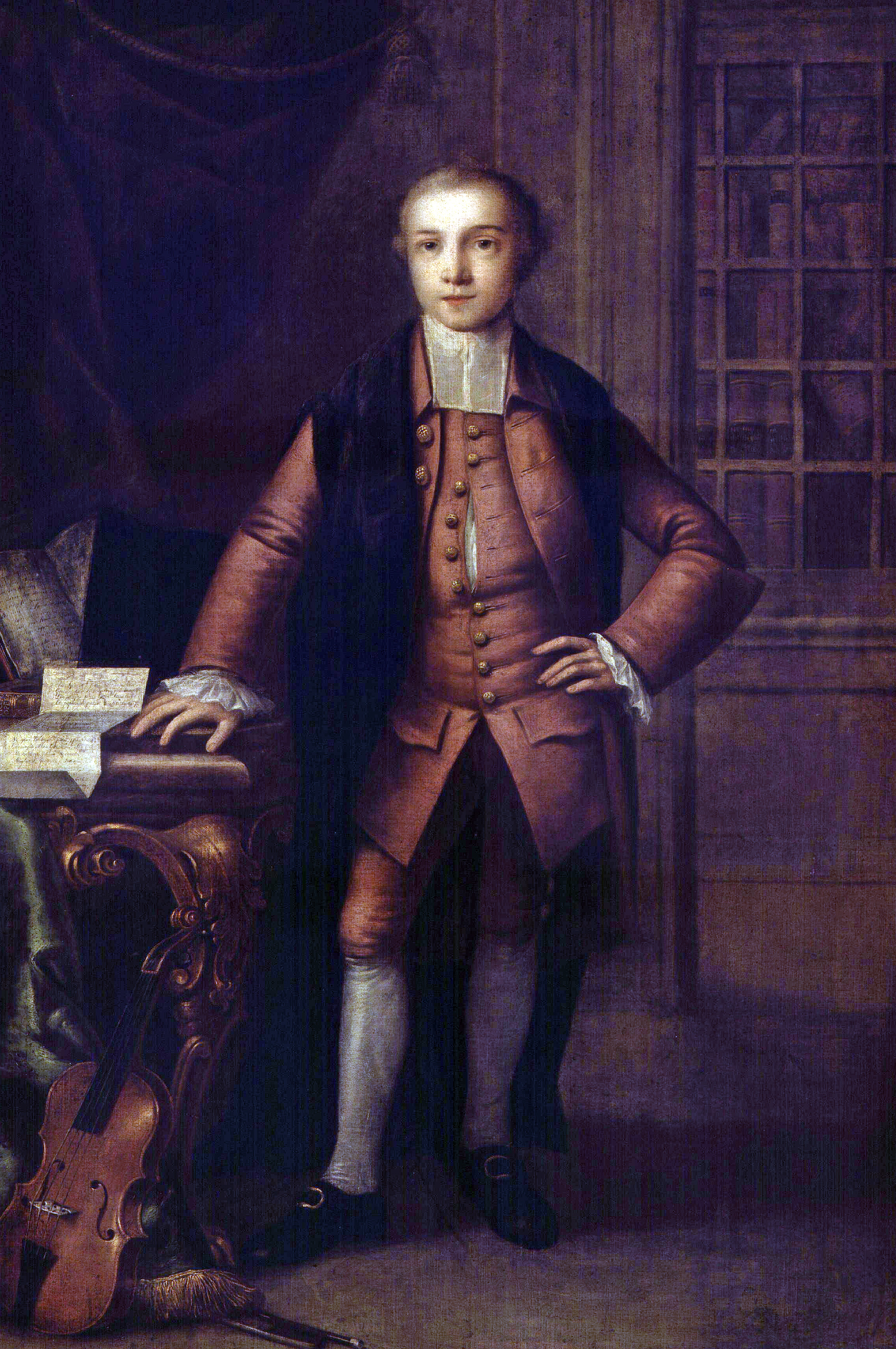
Portrait of Bentham by the studio of Thomas Frye, 1760–1762

Bentham was born on 4 February 1747/8 O.S. [15 February 1748 N.S.] in Houndsditch, London, to attorney Jeremiah Bentham and Alicia Woodward, widow of a Mr Whitehorne and daughter of mercer Thomas Grove, of Andover. His wealthy family were supporters of the Tory party. He was reportedly a child prodigy: he was found as a toddler sitting at his father's desk reading a multi-volume history of England, and he began to study Latin at the age of three. He learnt to play the violin, and at the age of seven Bentham would perform sonatas by Handel during dinner parties. He had one surviving sibling, Samuel Bentham, with whom he was close.

He attended Westminster School; in 1760, at age 12, his father sent him to The Queen's College, Oxford, where he completed his bachelor's degree in 1764, receiving the title of MA in 1767. He trained as a lawyer and, though he never practised, was called to the bar in 1769. He became deeply frustrated with the complexity of English law, which he termed the "Demon of Chicane". When the American colonies published their Declaration of Independence in July 1776, the British government did not issue any official response but instead secretly commissioned London lawyer and pamphleteer John Lind to publish a rebuttal. His 130-page tract was distributed in the colonies and contained an essay titled "Short Review of the Declaration" written by Bentham, a friend of Lind, which attacked and mocked the Americans' political philosophy.

=== Abortive prison project and the Panopticon ===
In 1786 and 1787, Bentham travelled to Krichev in White Russia, part of the Russian Empire (now Belarus), to visit his brother, Samuel, who was engaged in managing various industrial and other projects for Prince Potemkin. It was Samuel who conceived the basic idea of a circular building at the centre of a larger compound, designed to enable a small number of managers to oversee the activities of a large, unskilled workforce—a point Jeremy later repeatedly acknowledged.

Bentham began to develop this model, particularly as applicable to prisons, and outlined his ideas in a series of letters sent home to his father in England. He supplemented the supervisory principle with the idea of contract management; that is, an administration by contract as opposed to trust, where the director would have a pecuniary interest in lowering the average rate of mortality.

The Panopticon was intended to be cheaper than the prisons of his time, as it required fewer staff; "Allow me to construct a prison on this model", Bentham requested to a Committee for the Reform of Criminal Law, "I will be the gaoler. You will see ... that the gaoler will have no salary—will cost nothing to the nation." As the watchmen cannot be seen, they need not be on duty at all times, effectively leaving the watching to the watched. According to Bentham's design, the prisoners would also be used as menial labour, walking on wheels to spin looms or run a water wheel. This would decrease the cost of the prison and give a possible source of income.

The ultimately abortive proposal for a panopticon prison to be built in England was one among his many proposals for legal and social reform. But Bentham spent some sixteen years of his life developing and refining his ideas for the building and hoped that the government would adopt the plan for a National Penitentiary appointing him as contractor-governor. Although the prison was never built, the concept had an important influence on later generations of thinkers. Twentieth-century French philosopher Michel Foucault argued that the panopticon was paradigmatic of several 19th-century "disciplinary" institutions. Bentham remained bitter throughout his later life about the rejection of the panopticon scheme, convinced that it had been thwarted by the King and an aristocratic elite. Philip Schofield argues that it was largely because of his sense of injustice and frustration that he developed his ideas of "sinister interest"—that is, of the vested interests of the powerful conspiring against a wider public interest—which underpinned many of his broader arguments for reform.

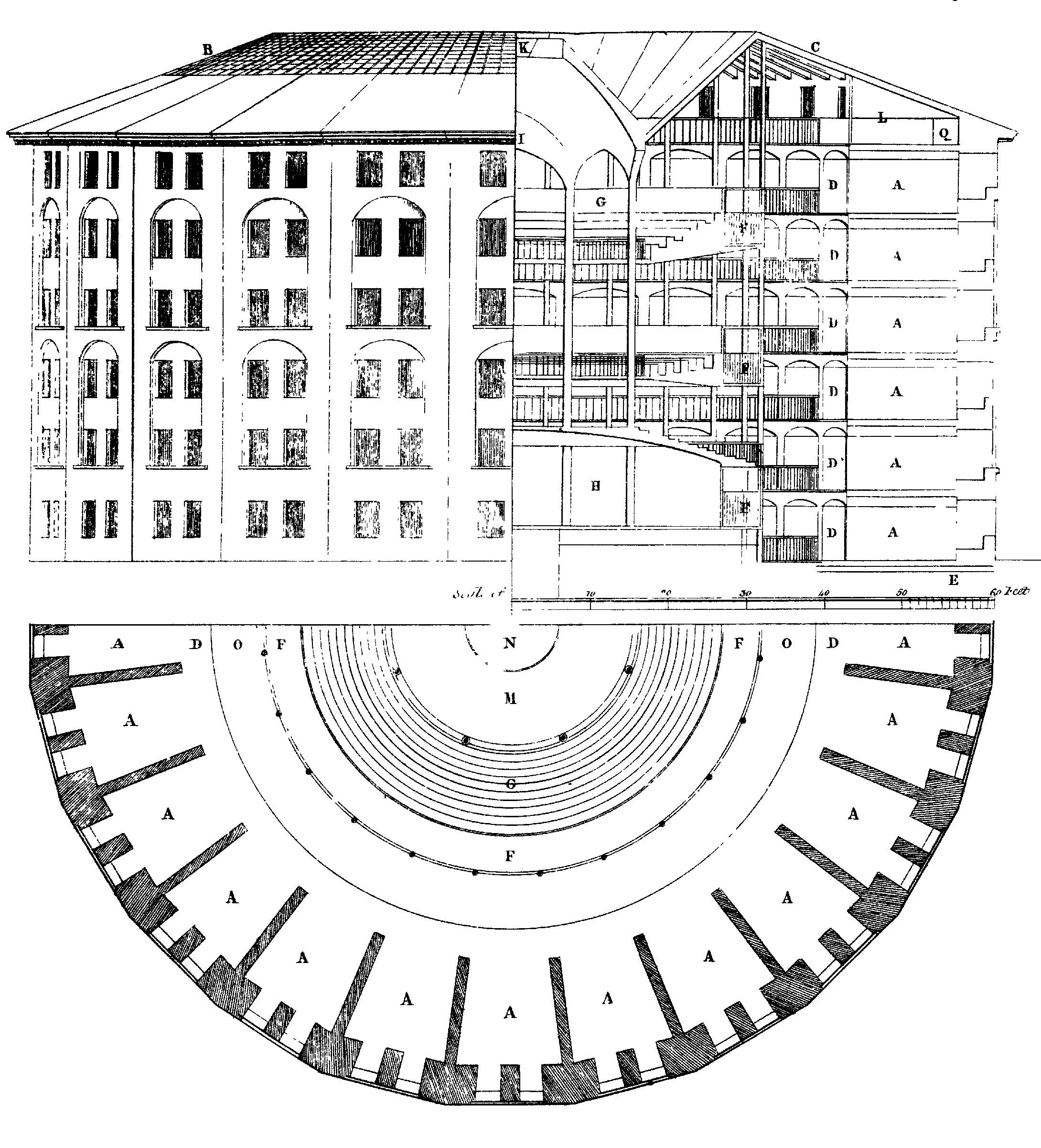
Elevation, section and plan of Bentham's panopticon prison, drawn by Willey Reveley in 1791

On his return to England from Russia, Bentham had commissioned drawings from an architect, Willey Reveley. In 1791, he published the material he had written as a book, although he continued to refine his proposals for many years to come. He had by now decided that he wanted to see the prison built: when finished, it would be managed by himself as contractor-governor, with the assistance of Samuel. After unsuccessful attempts to interest the authorities in Ireland and revolutionary France, he started trying to persuade the prime minister, William Pitt, to revive an earlier abandoned scheme for a National Penitentiary in England, this time to be built as a panopticon. He was eventually successful in winning over Pitt and his advisors, and in 1794 was paid £2,000 for preliminary work on the project.

The intended site was one that had been authorised, under the Appropriation Act 1799 (39 Geo. 3. c. 114) for the earlier penitentiary, at Battersea Rise; but the new proposals ran into technical legal problems and objections from the local landowner, the Earl Spencer. Other sites were considered, including one at Hanging Wood, near Woolwich, but all proved unsatisfactory. Eventually Bentham turned to a site at Tothill Fields, near Westminster. Although this was common land, with no landowner, there were a number of parties with interests in it, including Earl Grosvenor, who owned a house on an adjacent site and objected to the idea of a prison overlooking it. Again, therefore, the scheme ground to a halt At this point, however, it became clear that a nearby site at Millbank, adjoining the Thames, was available for sale, and this time things ran more smoothly. Using government money, Bentham bought the land on behalf of the Crown for £12,000 in November 1799.

From his point of view, the site was far from ideal, being marshy, unhealthy, and too small. When he asked the government for more land and more money, however, the response was that he should build only a small-scale experimental prison—which he interpreted as meaning that there was little real commitment to the concept of the panopticon as a cornerstone of penal reform. Negotiations continued, but in 1801 Pitt resigned from office, and in 1803 the new Addington administration decided not to proceed with the project. Bentham was devastated: "They have murdered my best days."

Nevertheless, a few years later the government revived the idea of a National Penitentiary, and in 1811 and 1812 returned specifically to the idea of a panopticon. Bentham, now aged 63, was still willing to be governor. However, as it became clear that there was still no real commitment to the proposal, he abandoned hope, and instead turned his attentions to extracting financial compensation for his years of fruitless effort. His initial claim was for the enormous sum of nearly £700,000, but he eventually settled for the more modest (but still considerable) sum of £23,000. The Penitentiary House, etc. Act 1812 (52 Geo. 3. c. 44) transferred his title in the site to the Crown.

More successful was his cooperation with Patrick Colquhoun in tackling the corruption in the Pool of London. This resulted in the Depredations on the Thames Act 1800 (39 & 40 Geo. 3. c. 87). The Act created the Thames River Police, which was the first preventive police force in the country and was a precedent for Robert Peel's reforms 30 years later.

=== South Australian colony proposal ===
On 3 August 1831 the Committee of the National Colonization Society approved the printing of its proposal to establish a free colony on the south coast of Australia, funded by the sale of appropriated colonial lands, overseen by a joint-stock company, and which would be granted powers of self-government as soon as was practicable. Contrary to assumptions, Bentham had no hand in the preparation of the 'Proposal to His Majesty's Government for founding a colony on the Southern Coast of Australia, which was prepared under the auspices of Robert Gouger, Charles Grey, 2nd Earl Grey, and Anthony Bacon. Bentham did, however, in August 1831, draft an unpublished work entitled 'Colonization Company Proposal', which constitutes his commentary upon the National Colonization Society's 'Proposal'.

=== The Westminster Review ===
In 1823, he co-founded The Westminster Review with James Mill as a journal for the "Philosophical Radicals"—a group of younger disciples through whom Bentham exerted considerable influence in British public life. One was John Bowring, to whom Bentham became devoted, describing their relationship as "son and father": he appointed Bowring political editor of The Westminster Review and eventually his literary executor. Another was Edwin Chadwick, who wrote on hygiene, sanitation, and policing and was a major contributor to the Poor Law Amendment Act 1834: Bentham employed Chadwick as a secretary and bequeathed him a large legacy.

=== Death and the auto-icon ===
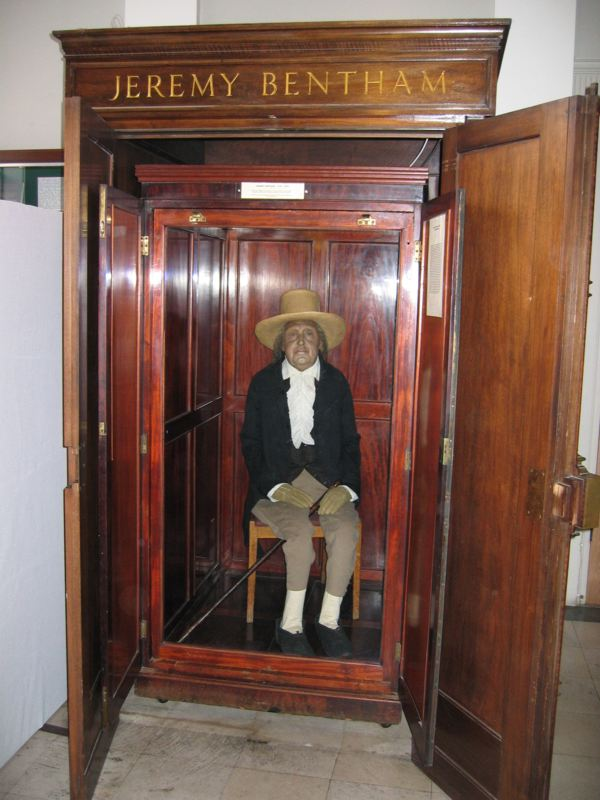
Bentham's auto-icon in 2003

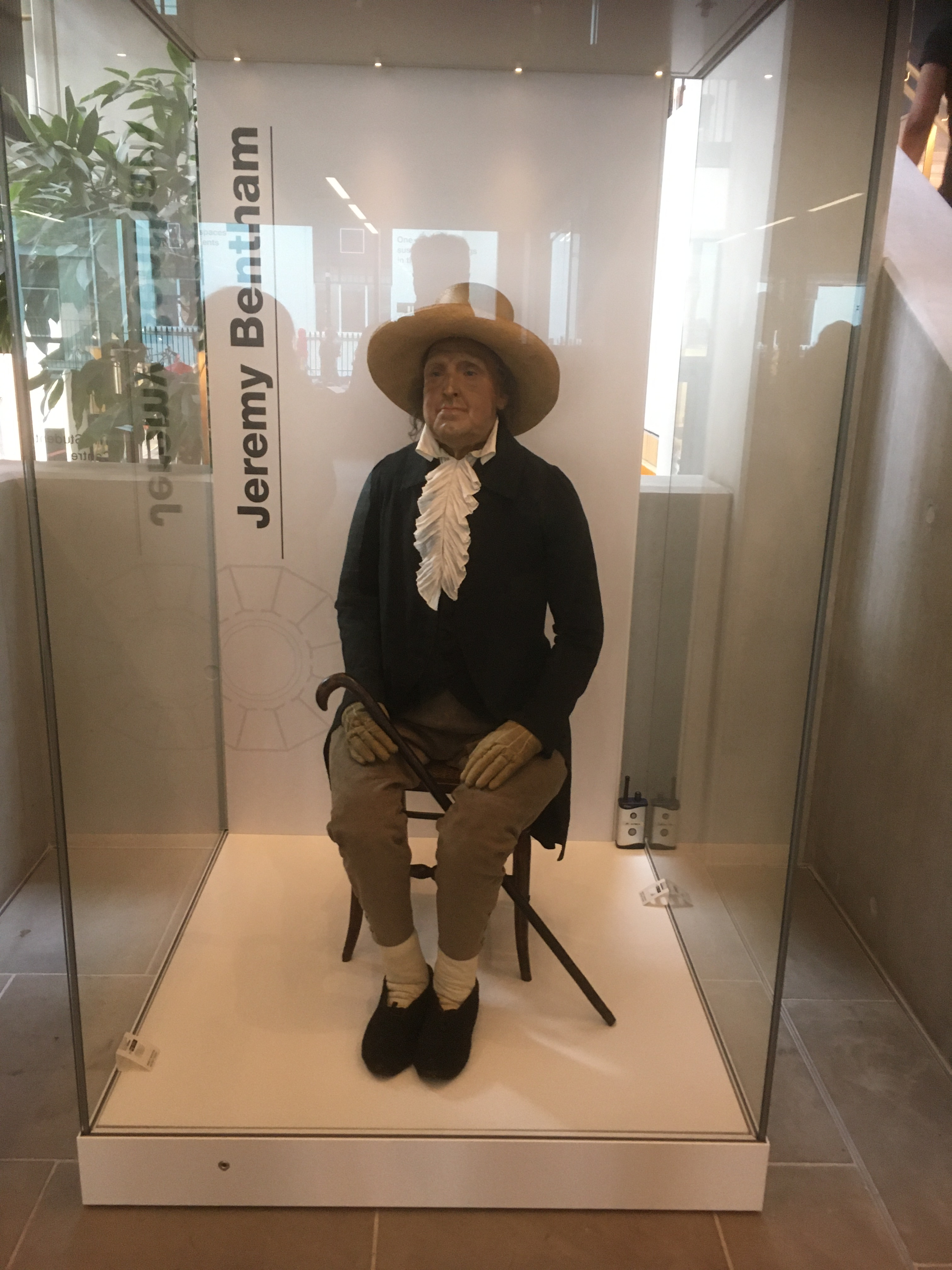
Bentham's auto-icon in a new display case at University College London's Student Centre in 2020

Bentham died on 6 June 1832, aged 84, at his residence in Queen Square Place in Westminster, London. He had continued to write up to a month before his death, and had made careful preparations for the dissection of his body after death and its preservation as an auto-icon. As early as 1769, when Bentham was 21 years old, he made a will leaving his body for dissection to a family friend, the physician and chemist George Fordyce, whose daughter, Maria Sophia (1765–1858), married Jeremy's brother Samuel Bentham. A paper written in 1830, instructing Thomas Southwood Smith to create the auto-icon, was attached to his last will, dated 30 May 1832. It stated:

My body I give to my dear friend Dr Southwood Smith to be disposed of in a manner hereinafter mentioned, and I direct ... he will take my body under his charge and take the requisite and appropriate measures for the disposal and preservation of the several parts of my bodily frame in the manner in the paper annexed to this my will and at the top of which I have written Auto Icon.

The skeleton he will cause to be put together in such a manner that the whole figure may be seated in a chair usually occupied by me when living, in the attitude in which I am sitting while engaged in thought in the course of time occupied in writing.

I direct that the body thus prepared shall be transferred to my executor. He will cause the skeleton to be clad in one of the suits of black occasionally worn by me. The body so clothed, together with the chair and the staff in my later years borne by me, he will take charge of, and for containing the whole apparatus he will cause to be prepared an appropriate box or case, and will cause to be engraved in conspicuous characters on a plate to be affixed thereon and also on the labels on the glass case in which the preparations of the soft parts of my body shall be contained, ... my name at length with the letters ob: followed by the day of my decease.

If it should so happen that my personal friends and other disciples should be disposed to meet together on some day or days of the year for the purpose of commemorating the founder of the greatest happiness system of morals and legislation, my executor will from time to time cause to be conveyed in the room in which they meet the said box or case with the contents therein, to be stationed in such part of the room as to the assembled company shall seem meet. – Queen's Square Place, Westminster, Wednesday 30 May 1832.

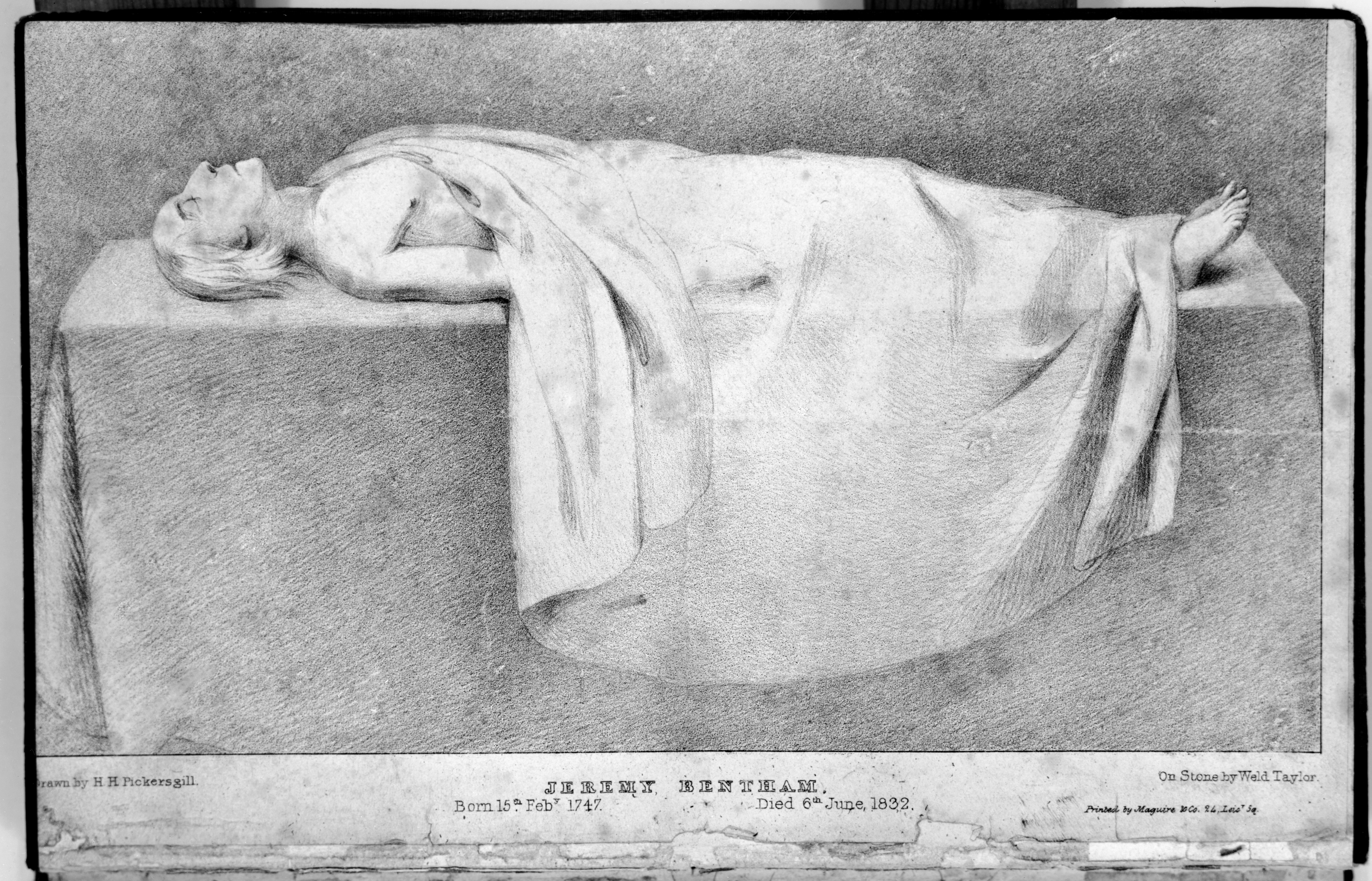
Bentham's public dissection

Bentham's wish to preserve his dead body was consistent with his philosophy of utilitarianism. In his essay Auto-Icon, or Farther Uses of the Dead to the Living, Bentham wrote, "If a country gentleman has rows of trees leading to his dwelling, the auto-icons of his family might alternate with the trees; copal varnish would protect the face from the effects of rain." On 8 June 1832, two days after his death, invitations were distributed to a select group of friends, and on the following day at 3 p.m., Southwood Smith delivered a lengthy oration over Bentham's remains in the Webb Street School of Anatomy & Medicine in Southwark, London. The printed oration contains a frontispiece with an engraving of Bentham's body partly covered by a sheet.

Afterward, the skeleton and head were preserved and stored in a wooden cabinet called the "auto-icon", with the skeleton padded out with hay and dressed in Bentham's clothes. From 1833, it stood in Southwood Smith's Finsbury Square consulting rooms until he abandoned private practice in the winter of 1849–50, when it was moved to 36 Percy Street, the studio of his unofficial partner, painter Margaret Gillies, who made studies of it. In March 1850, Southwood Smith offered the auto-icon to Henry Brougham, who readily accepted it for UCL.

It is currently kept on public display at the main entrance of the UCL Student Centre. It was previously displayed at the end of the South Cloisters in the main building of the college until it was moved in 2020. Upon the retirement of Sir Malcolm Grant as provost of the college in 2013, however, the body was present at Grant's final council meeting. As of 2013, this was the only time that the body of Bentham has been taken to a UCL council meeting. (There is a persistent myth that the body of Bentham is present at all council meetings noted as "Present-but not voting".)

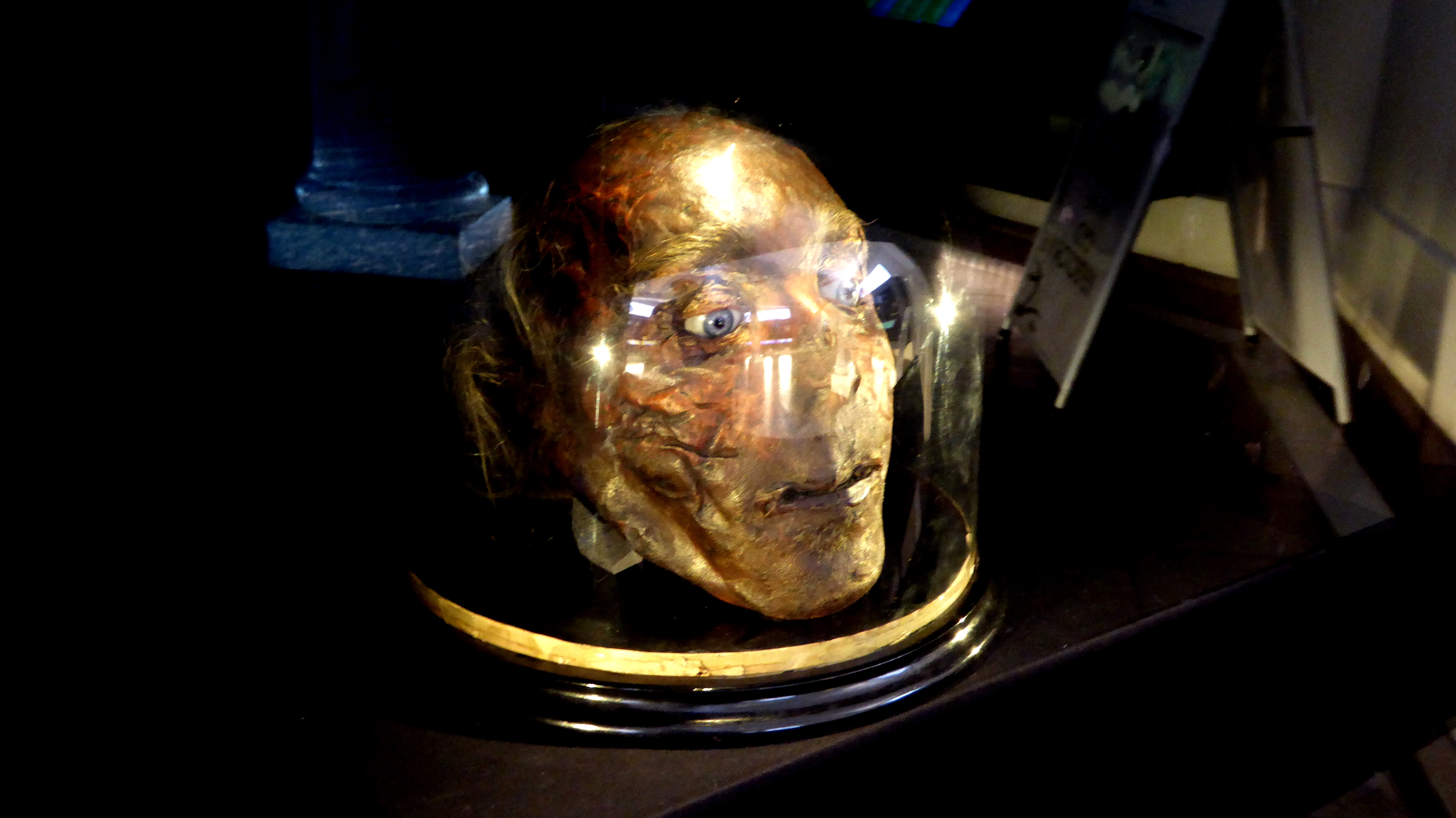
Jeremy Bentham's severed head, on temporary display at UCL

Bentham had intended the auto-icon to incorporate his actual head, mummified to resemble its appearance in life. Southwood Smith's experimental efforts at mummification – based on the preservation practices of New Zealand's indigenous Māori – involved placing the head under an air pump over sulphuric acid and drawing off the fluids. Although technically successful, they left the head looking distastefully macabre, with dried and darkened skin stretched tautly over the skull.

The auto-icon was therefore given a wax head, fitted with some of Bentham's own hair. The real head was displayed in the same case as the auto-icon for many years, but became the target of repeated student pranks. It was later locked away.

In 2020, the auto-icon was put into a new glass display case and moved to the entrance of UCL's new Student Centre on Gordon Square.

== Philosophy ==
=== Utilitarianism ===
Bentham today is considered as the "Father of Utilitarianism". His ambition in life was to create a "Pannomion", a complete utilitarian code of law. He not only proposed many legal and social reforms, but also expounded an underlying moral principle on which they should be based. This philosophy of utilitarianism took for its "fundamental axiom" to be the notion that it is the greatest happiness of the greatest number that is the measure of right and wrong. Bentham claimed to have borrowed this concept from the writings of Joseph Priestley, although the closest that Priestley in fact came to expressing it was in the form "the good and happiness of the members, that is the majority of the members of any state, is the great standard by which every thing [sic] relating to that state must finally be determined."

Bentham was a rare major figure in the history of philosophy to endorse psychological egoism. He was also a determined opponent of religion, as Crimmins observes: "Between 1809 and 1823 Jeremy Bentham carried out an exhaustive examination of religion with the declared aim of extirpating religious beliefs, even the idea of religion itself, from the minds of men."

Bentham also suggested a procedure for estimating the moral status of any action, which he called the hedonistic or felicific calculus.

Principle of utility

The principle of utility, or "greatest happiness principle", forms the cornerstone of all Bentham's thought. By "happiness", he understood a predominance of "pleasure" over "pain". He wrote in An Introduction to the Principles of Morals and Legislation:

Nature has placed mankind under the governance of two sovereign masters, pain and pleasure. It is for them alone to point out what we ought to do, as well as to determine what we shall do. On the one hand the standard of right and wrong, on the other the chain of causes and effects, are fastened to their throne. They govern us in all we do, in all we say, in all we think....

Bentham's Principles of Morals and Legislation focuses on the principle of utility and how this view of morality ties into legislative practices. His principle of utility regards good as that which produces the greatest amount of pleasure and the minimum amount of pain and evil as that which produces the most pain without the pleasure. This concept of pleasure and pain is defined by Bentham as physical as well as spiritual. Bentham writes about this principle as it manifests itself within the legislation of a society. Bentham viewed aesthetic value as related to pain and pleasure, remarking "Prejudice apart, the game of push-pin is of equal value with the arts and sciences of music and poetry. If the game of push-pin furnish more pleasure, it is more valuable than either"

In order to measure the extent of pain or pleasure that a certain decision will create, he lays down a set of criteria divided into the categories of intensity, duration, certainty, proximity, productiveness, purity, and extent. Using these measurements, he reviews the concept of punishment and when it should be used as far as whether a punishment will create more pleasure or more pain for a society.

He calls for legislators to determine whether punishment creates an even more evil offence. Instead of suppressing the evil acts, Bentham argues that certain unnecessary laws and punishments could ultimately lead to new and more dangerous vices than those being punished to begin with, and calls upon legislators to measure the pleasures and pains associated with any legislation and to form laws in order to create the greatest good for the greatest number. He argues that the concept of the individual pursuing his or her own happiness cannot be necessarily declared "right", because often these individual pursuits can lead to greater pain and less pleasure for a society as a whole. Therefore, the legislation of a society is vital to maintain the maximum pleasure and the minimum degree of pain for the greatest number of people.

==== Hedonistic/felicific calculus ====
In his exposition of the felicific calculus, Bentham proposed a classification of 12 pains and 14 pleasures, by which we might test the "happiness factor" of any action. For Bentham, according to P.J. Kelly, the law "provides the basic framework of social interaction by delimiting spheres of personal inviolability within which individuals can form and pursue their own conceptions of well-being". It provides security, a precondition for the formation of expectations. As the hedonic calculus shows "expectation utilities" to be much higher than natural ones, it follows that Bentham does not favour the sacrifice of a few to the benefit of the many. Law professor Alan Dershowitz has quoted Bentham to argue that torture should sometimes be permitted.

==== Criticisms ====
Utilitarianism was revised and expanded by Bentham's student John Stuart Mill, who sharply criticised Bentham's view of human nature, which failed to recognise conscience as a human motive. Mill considered Bentham's view "to have done and to be doing very serious evil". Through Mill's revisions, Bentham's utilitarian framework was softened and adapted in ways that allowed it to shape liberal conceptions of what state policy should seek to achieve.

Bentham's critics have claimed that he undermined the foundation of a free society by rejecting natural rights. Historian Gertrude Himmelfarb wrote "The principle of the greatest happiness of the greatest number was as inimical to the idea of liberty as to the idea of rights."

Bentham's "hedonistic" theory (a term from J. J. C. Smart) is often criticised for lacking a principle of fairness embodied in a conception of justice. In Bentham and the Common Law Tradition, Gerald J. Postema states: "No moral concept suffers more at Bentham's hand than the concept of justice. There is no sustained, mature analysis of the notion." Thus, some critics object, it would be acceptable to torture one person if this would produce an amount of happiness in other people outweighing the unhappiness of the tortured individual. However, as P.J. Kelly argued in Utilitarianism and Distributive Justice: Jeremy Bentham and the Civil Law, Bentham had a theory of justice that prevented such consequences.

=== Animal rights ===
Bentham is widely regarded as one of the earliest proponents of animal rights. He argued and believed that the ability to suffer, not the ability to reason, should be the benchmark, or what he called the "insuperable line". If reason alone were the criterion by which we judge who ought to have rights, human infants and adults with certain forms of disability might fall short, too. In 1780, alluding to the limited degree of legal protection afforded to slaves in the French West Indies by the Code Noir, he wrote:

The day has been, I am sad to say in many places it is not yet past, in which the greater part of the species, under the denomination of slaves, have been treated by the law exactly upon the same footing, as, in England for example, the inferior races of animals are still. The day may come when the rest of the animal creation may acquire those rights which never could have been witholden from them but by the hand of tyranny. The French have already discovered that the blackness of the skin is no reason a human being should be abandoned without redress to the caprice of a tormentor. It may one day come to be recognised that the number of the legs, the villosity of the skin, or the termination of the os sacrum are reasons equally insufficient for abandoning a sensitive being to the same fate. What else is it that should trace the insuperable line? Is it the faculty of reason or perhaps the faculty of discourse? But a full-grown horse or dog, is beyond comparison a more rational, as well as a more conversable animal, than an infant of a day or a week or even a month, old. But suppose the case were otherwise, what would it avail? The question is not, Can they reason? nor, Can they talk? but, Can they suffer?

Earlier in the paragraph, Bentham makes clear that he accepted that animals could be killed for food, or in defence of human life, provided that the animal was not made to suffer unnecessarily.

In 1824, animal experimentation became the subject of considerable controversy in Britain after the French physiologist François Magendie gave public demonstrations of vivisection in London. One particularly notorious experiment on a live greyhound was widely condemned for the severe and prolonged suffering it caused. In February 1825, Richard Martin, an Irish MP and prominent campaigner against cruelty to animals, denounced Magendie's demonstrations in the House of Commons, while acknowledging that some experiments on living animals could be justified.

Against the background of this controversy and Martin's parliamentary campaign, Bentham addressed the Morning Chronicle in March 1825. The newspaper had published attacks on animal-welfare legislation and had mocked Martin. Bentham did not object to medical experiments on animals as such when they had a determinate object beneficial to humanity and a reasonable prospect of achieving it. He wrote that otherwise he had a "decided and insuperable objection" to causing pain to animals, in part because of the harmful effects such practices might have on human beings. In his letter he wrote:

I never have seen, nor ever can see, any objection to the putting of dogs and other inferior animals to pain, in the way of medical experiment, when that experiment has a determinate object, beneficial to mankind, accompanied with a fair prospect of the accomplishment of it. But I have a decided and insuperable objection to the putting of them to pain without any such view. To my apprehension, every act by which, without prospect of preponderant good, pain is knowingly and willingly produced in any being whatsoever, is an act of cruelty; and, like other bad habits, the more the correspondent habit is indulged in, the stronger it grows, and the more frequently productive of its bad fruit. I am unable to comprehend how it should be, that to him to whom it is a matter of amusement to see a dog or a horse suffer, it should not be matter of like amusement to see a man suffer; seeing, as I do, how much more morality as well as intelligence, an adult quadruped of those and many other species has in him, than any biped has for some months after he has been brought into existence; nor does it appear to me how it should be, that a person to whom the production of pain, either in the one or in the other instance, is a source of amusement, would scruple to give himself that amusement when he could do so under an assurance of impunity.

=== Economics ===
Bentham believed that individuals should pursue their interests in a free market and generally endorsed laissez-faire, when it produced the best result. Regarding the role of government in the economy, he said "With the view of causing an increase to take place in the mass of national wealth...the general rule is, that nothing ought to be done or attempted by government. The motto, or watchword of government, on these occasions, ought to be—Be quiet." Whilst recognising the law of diminishing marginal utility, that an extra £1 contributes less utility to a rich man than it does to a poor one, and viewing some amount of redistributive taxation as warranted, he cautioned against complete redistribution of property. Whilst arguing that "the pain of death, which would presently fall upon the starving poor, would be always a more serious evil than the pain of disappointment which falls upon the rich when a portion of his superfluity is taken from him", Bentham added "In the amount of the legal contribution we ought not to go beyond what is simply necessary. To go beyond that would be taxing industry for the support of idleness."

Bentham stated that pleasures and pains can be ranked according to their value or "dimension" such as intensity, duration, certainty of a pleasure or a pain. He was concerned with maxima and minima of pleasures and pains; and they set a precedent for the future employment of the maximisation principle in the economics of the consumer, the firm and the search for an optimum in welfare economics.

Bentham advocated "Pauper Management" which involved the creation of a chain of large workhouses.

Andrew Lawless writes that Bentham's "theoretical contributions to the political, economic, legal and psychological structures of English capitalism were enormous. Even Marx moved through a world that had been well-described by the arch-Philistine's voice. In his unique way, Bentham defined and analyzed the England of the late-eighteenth and early-nineteenth centuries, creating not only a comprehensive social theory but, with the help of James Mill and others, a political movement to go with it."

==== Monetary economics ====
Bentham's opinions about monetary economics were completely different from those of David Ricardo; however, they had some similarities to those of Henry Thornton. He focused on monetary expansion as a means of helping to create full employment. He was also aware of the relevance of forced saving, propensity to consume, the saving-investment relationship, and other matters that form the content of modern income and employment analysis. His monetary view was close to the fundamental concepts employed in his model of utilitarian decision making. His work is considered to be an early precursor of modern welfare economics.

=== Gender and sexuality ===
Bentham said that it was the placing of women in a legally inferior position that made him choose in 1759, at the age of eleven, the career of a reformist, though American critic John Neal claimed to have convinced him to take up women's rights issues during their association between 1825 and 1827. Bentham spoke for a complete equality between the sexes, arguing in favour of women's suffrage, a woman's right to obtain a divorce, and a woman's right to hold political office.

The c. 1785 essay "Paederasty (Offences Against One's Self)" argued for the liberalisation of laws prohibiting homosexual sex. The essay remained unpublished during his lifetime for fear of offending public morality. Some of Bentham's writings on "sexual non-conformity" were published for the first time in 1931, but Paederasty was not published until 1978. Bentham does not believe homosexual acts to be unnatural, describing them merely as "irregularities of the venereal appetite". The essay chastises the society of the time for making a disproportionate response to what Bentham appears to consider a largely private offence—public displays or forced acts being dealt with rightly by other laws. When the essay was published in the Journal of Homosexuality in 1978, the abstract stated that Bentham's essay was the "first known argument for homosexual law reform in England".

=== Racial views ===
Bentham believed each race to be different, independent of climate or place of birth. He wrote in An Introduction to the Principles of Morals and Legislation:

"Another article in the catalogue of secondary circumstances, is that of race or lineage: the national race or lineage a man issues from. This circumstance, independently of that of climate, will commonly make some difference in point of radical frame of mind and body. A man of negro race, born in France or England, is a very different being, in many respects, from a man of French or English race. A man of Spanish race, born in Mexico or Peru, is at the hour of his birth a different sort of being, in many respects, from a man of the original Mexican or Peruvian race. This circumstance, as far as it is distinct from climate, rank, and education, and from the two just mentioned, operates chiefly through the medium of moral, religious, sympathetic, and antipathetic biases".

— Bentham, Jeremy, An Introduction to the Principles of Morals and Legislation, p. 56

In the 1782 essay Of the Influence of Time and Place in Matters of Legislation, Bentham wrote "The ascendancy of the English is an ascendancy of wisdom and understanding:—it is the same ascendancy that a Brahmin has over a Parias—a European over a Brahmin—and an Englishman over another European". Whilst opposing imperialism, Bentham wrote in Emancipate Your Colonies that "it was in the long-term interests of India to be governed by a civilized nation like Britain".

Bentham viewed the Aboriginal Australians as an uncivilised people. In an 1802 letter to Lord Pelham, Bentham described the Aboriginal people in New South Wales as "brutes in human shape", "the very dregs even of savage life—a species of society beyond comparison less favourable to colonisation than utter solitude", and "a set of living nuisances". Writing in Colonization Company Proposal (1831), Bentham described the "hostility of the uncivilized aborigines".

=== Imperialism ===
Bentham's writings in the early 1790s onwards expressed an opposition to imperialism. His 1793 pamphlet Emancipate Your Colonies! critiqued French colonialism. In the early 1820s, he argued that the liberal government in Spain should emancipate its New World colonies. In the essay Plan for an Universal and Perpetual Peace, Bentham argued that Britain should emancipate its New World colonies and abandon its colonial ambitions. He argued that empire was bad for the greatest number in the metropole and the colonies. According to Bentham, empire was financially unsound, entailed taxation on the poor in the metropole, caused unnecessary expansion in the military apparatus, undermined the security of the metropole, and were ultimately motivated by misguided ideas of honour and glory. Barbara Arneil at the University of British Columbia describes Bentham as "best understood as a pro-colonialist and anti-imperialist thinker".

=== Law reform ===
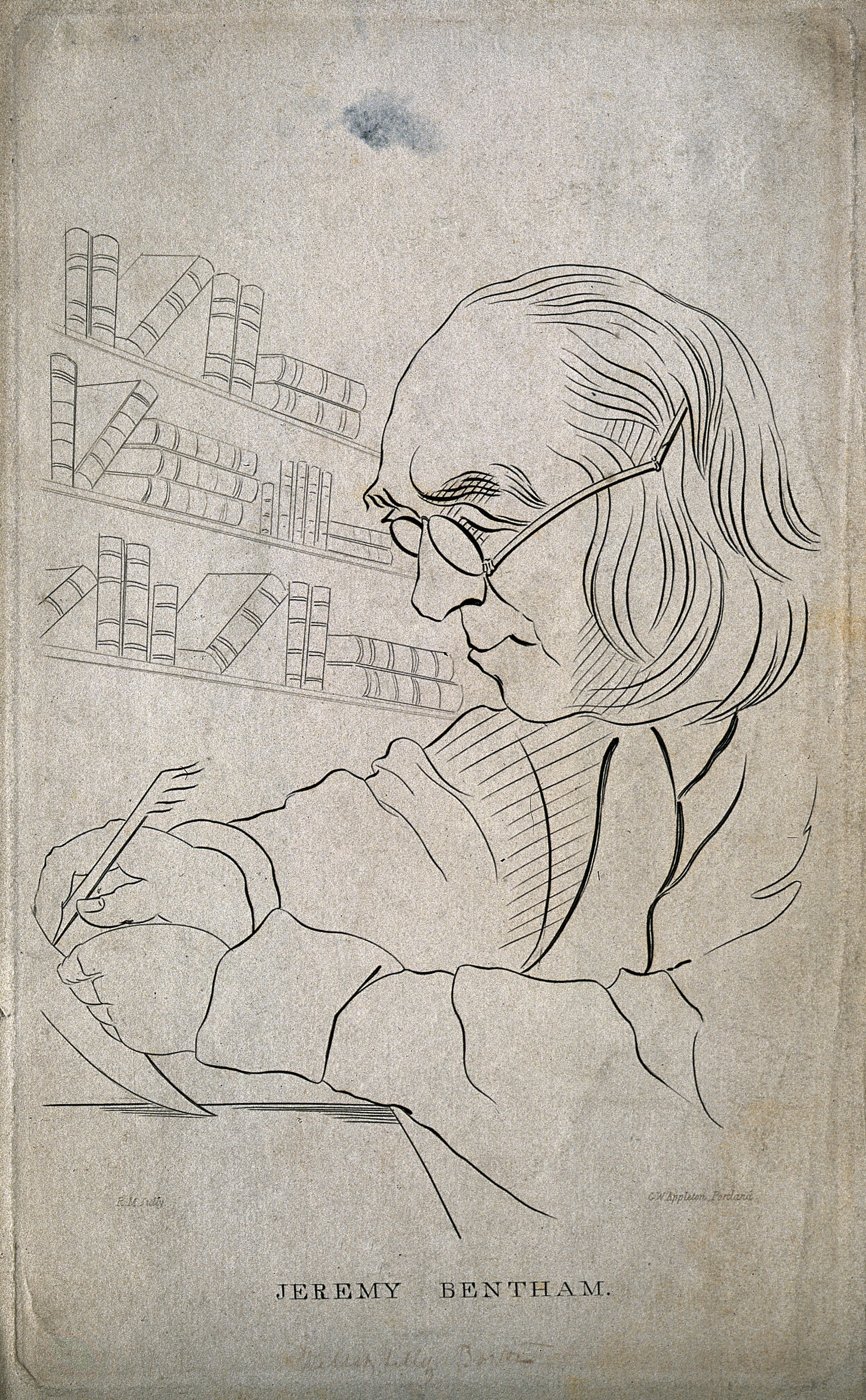
1829 etching by G.W. Appleton

Bentham was the first person to be an aggressive advocate for the codification of all of the common law into a coherent set of statutes; he was actually the person who coined the verb "to codify" to refer to the process of drafting a legal code. He lobbied hard for the formation of codification commissions in both England and the United States, and went so far as to write to President James Madison in 1811 to volunteer to write a complete legal code for the young country. After he learned more about American law and realised that most of it was state-based, he promptly wrote to the governors of every single state with the same offer.

During his lifetime, Bentham's codification efforts were completely unsuccessful. Even today, they have been completely rejected by almost every common law jurisdiction, including England. However, his writings on the subject laid the foundation for the moderately successful codification work of David Dudley Field II in the United States a generation later.

=== United States ===
Bentham's views on the United States changed over time. He initially disapproved of the American revolution and the natural rights philosophy behind it, describing the United States Declaration of Independence as a "hodge-podge of confusion and absurdity in which the thing to be proved is all along taken for granted". By the end of his life, Bentham was a strong admirer of the United States, describing himself in an 1817 letter to John Adams Smith as a "Philo-Yankee". Writing to Andrew Jackson in 1830, Bentham described himself as "at heart more of a United-States-man than an Englishman".

=== Privacy ===
For Bentham, transparency had moral value. For example, journalism puts power-holders under moral scrutiny. However, Bentham wanted such transparency to apply to everyone influential. This he describes by picturing the world as a gymnasium in which each "gesture, every turn of limb or feature, in those whose motions have a visible impact on the general happiness, will be noticed and marked down". He considered both surveillance and transparency to be useful ways of generating understanding and improvements for people's lives.

=== Theory of Fictions ===
Bentham's Theory of Fictions explored how language shapes thought, particularly in legal and political discourse. He distinguished between "fabulous entities", which are purely imaginary (e.g., literary or mythological figures like Prince Hamlet or a centaur), and "fictitious entities", which have no physical existence but are essential for reasoning (e.g., laws, rights, and obligations). Similar to Kant's categories, such as nature, custom, or the social contract, these fictitious entities help structure human understanding but do not exist independently.

While Bentham acknowledged the necessity of "fictitious entities" for communication, he warned that they could obscure truth and be manipulated for deception, especially in law. He viewed legal fictions—such as the notion of corporate personhood or sovereignty—as tools that could be either useful or misleading, depending on their application. His analysis influenced later thinkers in legal theory, philosophy of language, and utilitarian ethics, advocating for clarity and empirical reasoning in public affairs.

== Legacy ==
=== Influences ===
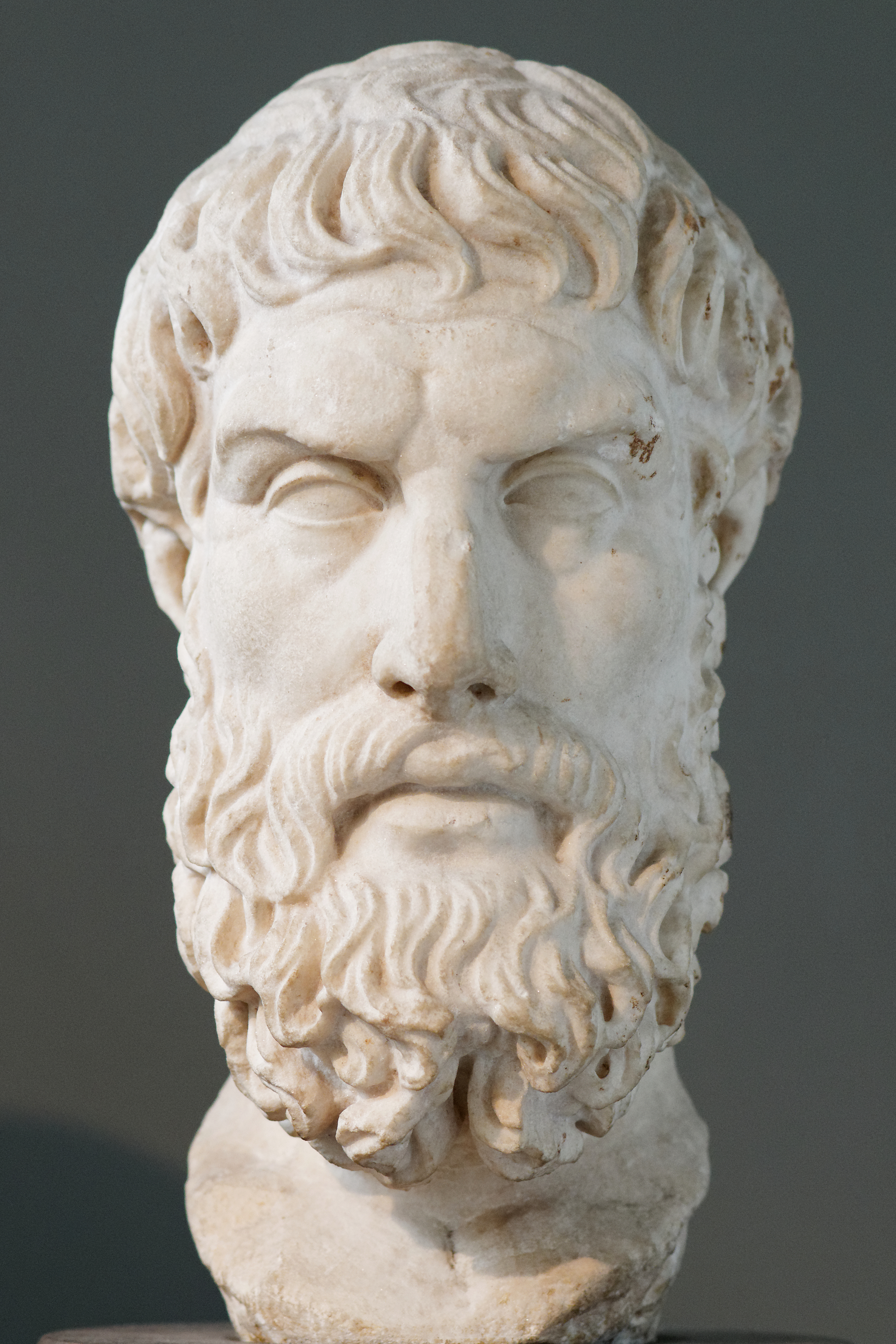
Bentham was influenced by Epicureanism.

Amongst his influences, Bentham cited d'Alembert, Beccaria, Epicurus, Hume, Locke, Montesquieu and Priestley.

Bentham was greatly influenced by the ancient Greek philosopher Epicurus. It is believed that Bentham encountered the works of Epicurus during his studies at Oxford, possibly being attracted to Epicureanism through reading the account, although an unsympathetic one, given in Cicero's Tusculan Disputations. A voracious reader, Bentham likely also read works by contemporary Epicurean writers.

According to Bentham's later reminiscences, a copy of Helvétius' De l'esprit "fell into [his] hands" at the age of 20. Bentham described his philosophy as having been "built solely on the foundation of utility, laid as it is by Helvétius". Regarding the influence of Helvétius on his works, Bentham recalled "Montesquieu, Barrington, Beccaria, and Helvétius, but most of all Helvétius, set me on the principle of utility".

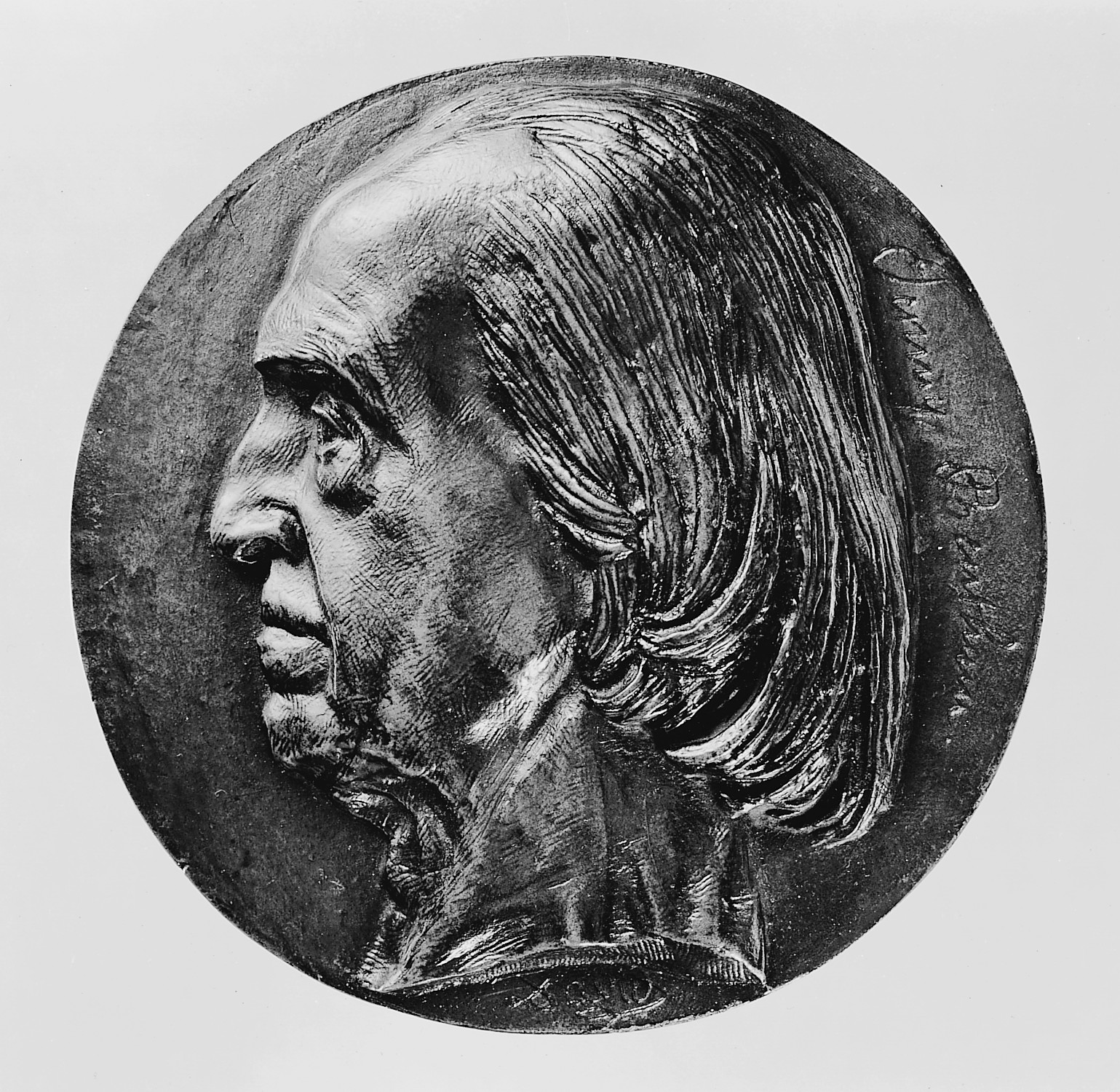
French medallion, modelled c. 1830, cast before 1844

Bentham's utilitarian philosophy provided an argument for Victorian laissez-faire, with the view that economic growth would deliver the greatest happiness for the greatest number. Eric Hobsbawm, in The Age of Revolution: Europe 1789–1848, writes that Bentham's reforming ideas "expressed the bourgeois Britain of the 1830s".

Bentham influenced economists such as Milton Friedman and Henry Hazlitt.

In their youth, Karl Marx and Friedrich Engels were interested in Bentham's ideas and utilitarian philosophy. Marx later became disillusioned with Bentham's ideas, describing him as "a genius of bourgeois stupidity", and viewed Bentham's views as too English and petite bourgeoisie, saying "With the dullest naïveté he takes the modern petty-bourgeois philistine, especially the English philistine, as the normal man. Whatever is useful to this queer variety of normal man, and to his world, is useful in and for itself. This yardstick, then, he applies to past, present and future."

Bentham coined over 250 new words, including "codify," "deontology," "exhaustive," "international," "maximize," "monetary," "percentage" and "pluralism".

The Faculty of Laws at University College London occupies Bentham House, next to the main UCL campus.

Bentham's name was adopted by the Australian litigation funder IMF Limited to become Bentham IMF Limited on 28 November 2013, in recognition of Bentham being "among the first to support the utility of litigation funding".

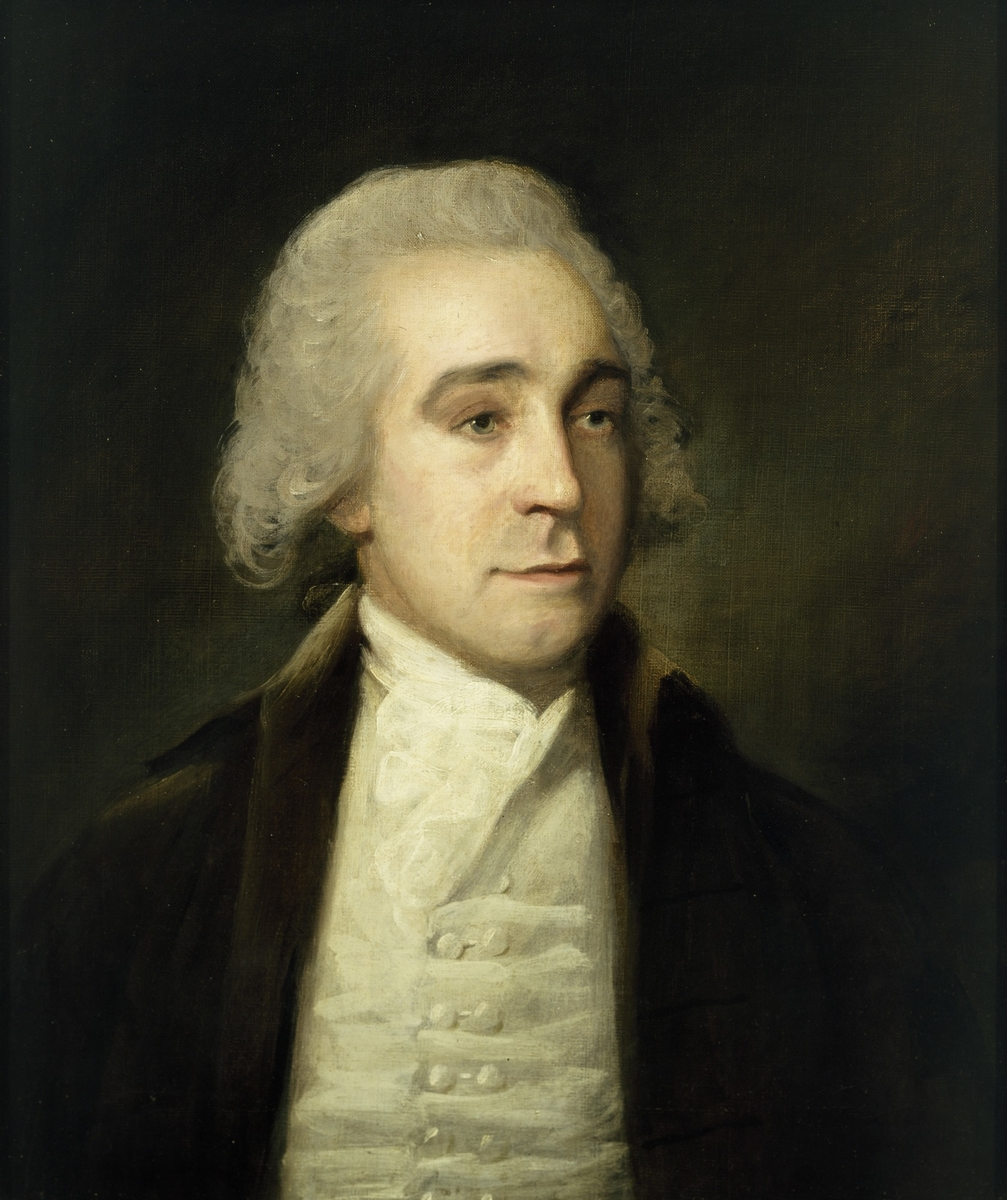
Bentham by an unknown artist, c. 1790

Bentham was in correspondence with many influential people. In the 1780s, for example, Bentham maintained a correspondence with the ageing Adam Smith, in an unsuccessful attempt to convince Smith that interest rates should be allowed to freely float. As a result of his correspondence with Mirabeau and other leaders of the French Revolution, Bentham was declared an honorary citizen of France. He was an outspoken critic of the revolutionary discourse of natural rights and of the violence that arose after the Jacobins took power (1792). Between 1808 and 1810, he held a personal friendship with Latin American revolutionary Francisco de Miranda and paid visits to Miranda's Grafton Way house in London. He also developed links with José Cecilio del Valle.

In 1821, John Cartwright proposed to Bentham that they serve as "Guardians of Constitutional Reform", seven "wise men" whose reports and observations would "concern the entire Democracy or Commons of the United Kingdom". Describing himself, among the names mentioned which also included Sir Francis Burdett, George Ensor, and Sir Matthew Wood, and as a "nonentity", Bentham declined the offer.

=== University College London ===
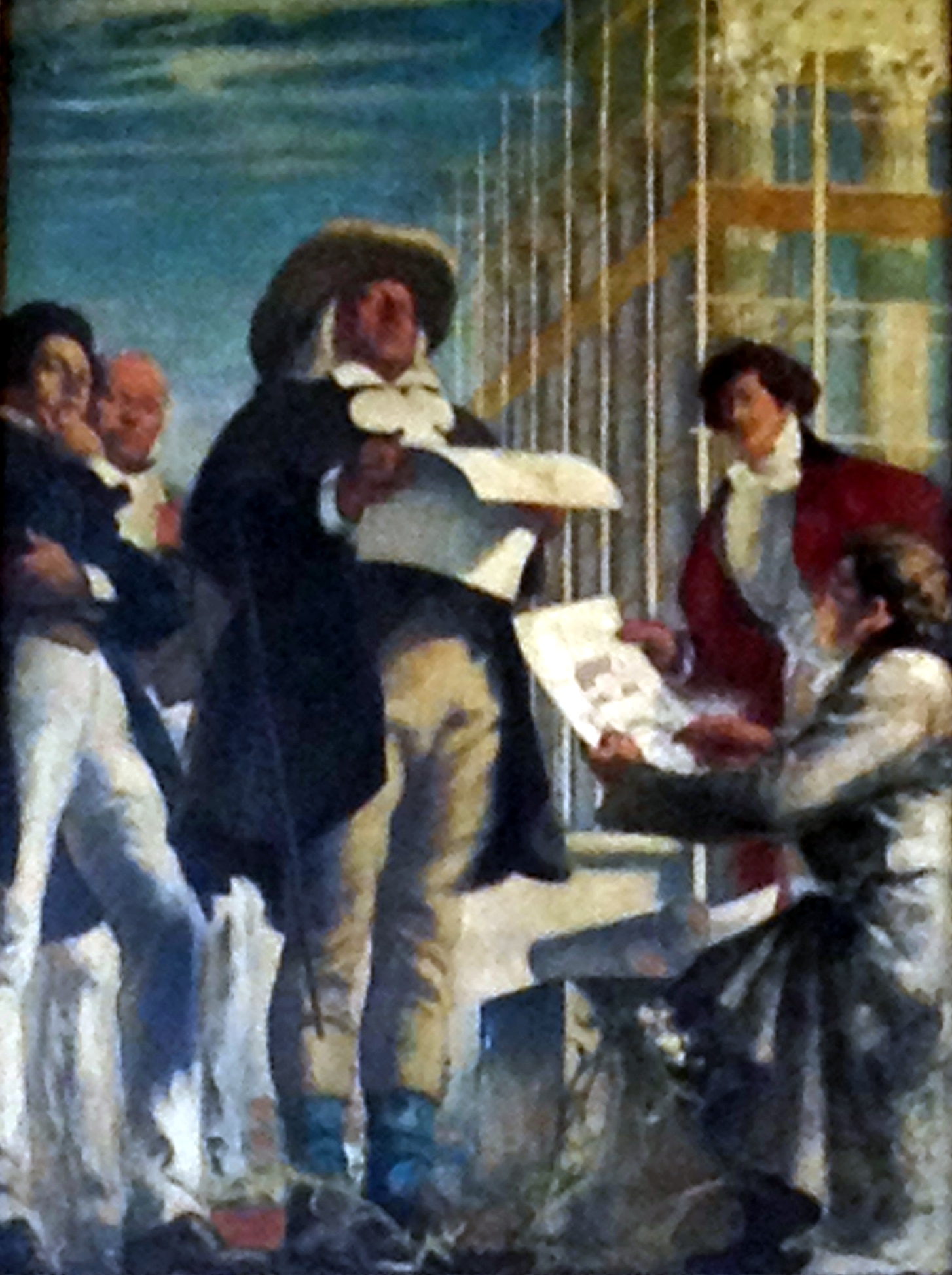
Henry Tonks' imaginary scene of Bentham approving the building plans of London University

Bentham is widely associated with the foundation in 1826 of London University (the institution that, in 1836, became University College London), though he was 78 years old when the university opened and played only an indirect role in its establishment. His direct involvement was limited to his buying a single £100 share in the new university, making him just one of over a thousand shareholders.

Bentham and his ideas can nonetheless be seen as having inspired several of the actual founders of the university. He strongly believed that education should be more widely available, particularly to those who were not wealthy or who did not belong to the established church; in Bentham's time, membership of the Church of England and the capacity to bear considerable expenses were required of students entering the Universities of Oxford and Cambridge. As the University of London was the first in England to admit all, regardless of race, creed or political belief, it was largely consistent with Bentham's vision. There is some evidence that, from the sidelines, he played a "more than passive part" in the planning discussions for the new institution, although it is also apparent that "his interest was greater than his influence". He failed in his efforts to see his disciple John Bowring appointed professor of English or History, but he did oversee the appointment of another pupil, John Austin, as the first professor of Jurisprudence in 1829.

The more direct associations between Bentham and UCL—the college's custody of his Auto-icon (see above) and of the majority of his surviving papers—postdate his death by some years: the papers were donated in 1849, and the Auto-icon in 1850. A large painting by Henry Tonks hanging in UCL's Flaxman Gallery depicts Bentham approving the plans of the new university, but it was executed in 1922 and the scene is entirely imaginary. Since 1959 (when the Bentham Committee was first established), UCL has hosted the Bentham Project, which is progressively publishing a definitive edition of Bentham's writings.

UCL now endeavours to acknowledge Bentham's influence on its foundation, while avoiding any suggestion of direct involvement, by describing him as its "spiritual founder".

== Personal life ==
Bentham lived a highly structured and disciplined life, but he also exhibited eccentric behavior. He referred to his walking stick as "Dapple" and his cat as "The Reverend Sir John Langbourne." He had several infatuations with women, and wrote on sex, but he never married. Bentham's daily pattern was to rise at 6 am, walk for 2 hours or more, and then work until 4 pm.

An insight into his character is given in Michael St. John Packe's The Life of John Stuart Mill:

During his youthful visits to Bowood House, the country seat of his patron Lord Lansdowne, he had passed his time at falling unsuccessfully in love with all the ladies of the house, whom he courted with a clumsy jocularity, while playing chess with them or giving them lessons on the harpsichord. Hopeful to the last, at the age of eighty he wrote again to one of them, recalling to her memory the far-off days when she had "presented him, in ceremony, with the flower in the green lane" [citing Bentham's memoirs]. To the end of his life he could not hear of Bowood without tears swimming in his eyes, and he was forced to exclaim, "Take me forward, I entreat you, to the future—do not let me go back to the past."

A psychobiographical study by Philip Lucas and Anne Sheeran argues that he may have had Asperger's syndrome.

== Works ==
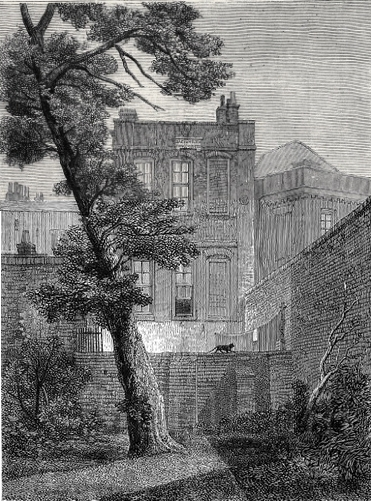
The back of No. 19, York Street (1848). In 1651 John Milton moved into a "pretty garden-house" in Petty France. He lived there until the Restoration. Later it became No. 19 York Street, belonged to Jeremy Bentham (who for a time lived next door), was occupied successively by James Mill and William Hazlitt, and finally demolished in 1877.

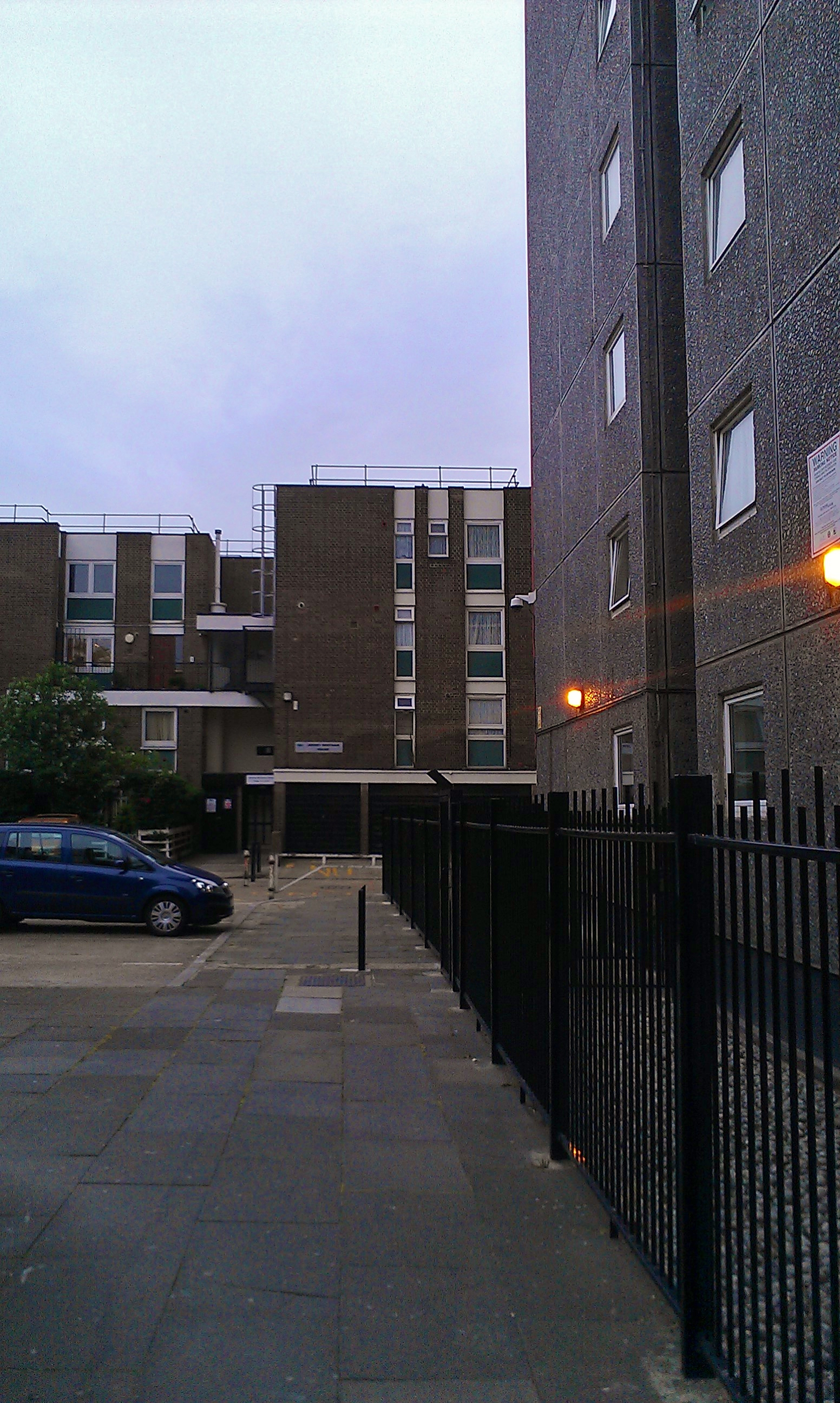
Jeremy Bentham House in Bethnal Green, East London; a modernist apartment block named after the philosopher

Bentham was an obsessive writer and reviser, but was only able on rare occasions of bringing his work to completion and publication. Most of what appeared in print in his lifetime was prepared for publication by others. Several of his works first appeared in French translation, prepared for the press by Étienne Dumont, for example, Theory of Legislation, Volume 2 (Principles of the Penal Code) 1840, Weeks, Jordan, & Company. Boston. Some made their first appearance in English in the 1820s as a result of back-translation from Dumont's 1802 collection (and redaction) of Bentham's writing on civil and penal legislation.

=== Publications ===
- A Fragment on Government (1776).
  - This was an unsparing criticism of some introductory passages relating to political theory in William Blackstone's Commentaries on the Laws of England. The book, published anonymously, was well received and credited to some of the greatest minds of the time. Bentham disagreed with Blackstone's defence of judge-made law, his defence of legal fictions, his theological formulation of the doctrine of mixed government, his appeal to a social contract and his use of the vocabulary of natural law. Bentham's "Fragment" was only a small part of a Commentary on the Commentaries, which remained unpublished until the twentieth century.
- Short Review of the Declaration (1776).
  - An attack on the United States Declaration of Independence.
- An Introduction to the Principles of Morals and Legislation. London: T. Payne and Sons, 1780.
- Offences Against One's Self. Written 1785, published 1978 in the Journal of Homosexuality, 3(4), 398–405, continued in 4(1). doi:10.1300/J082v03n04_07. ISSN 0091-8369. PMID 353189.
- Panopticon; or, the Inspection-House (1787).
- Defence of Usury (1787). Ed. 4 – London: Payne and Foss, 1818.
  - A series of thirteen letters addressed to Adam Smith.
- Essay on Political Tactics. London: T. Payne, 1791.
- Anarchical Fallacies; Being an Examination of the Declarations of Rights Issued During the French Revolution (1796).
  - An attack on the Declaration of the Rights of Man decreed by the French Revolution, and critique of the natural rights philosophy underlying it.
- French: Traités de Législation Civile et Pénale, lit. 'Treatises on Civil and Penal Legislation'. Edited and translated into French by Étienne Dumont, 1802. Ed. 3 – Paris: Rey et Gravier, Libraire, 1830 – vol. 1, vol. 2 vol. 3.
- French: Théorie des Peines et des Récompenses, lit. 'Theory of Punishments and Rewards'. Edited and translated into French by Étienne Dumont, 1811.
  - Ed. 3 – Paris: Bossange Frères, Libraire, 1825 – vol. 1, vol. 2.
  - English ed. 1 – vol. 1 (The Rationale of Punishment), London: Robert Heward, 1830; vol. 2 (The Rationale of Reward), London: John and H. L. Hunt, 1825.
  - The English volumes were published in the reverse of the French language publication order.
- Panopticon versus New South Wales: or, the Panopticon Penitentiary System, and the Penal Colonization System, Compared. London: Robert Baldwin and James Ridgway, 1812. The text con'tains:
  1. Two letters to Lord Pelham, Secretary of State, Comparing the two Systems on the Ground of Expediency.
  2. "Plea for the Constitution: Representing the Illegalities involved in the Penal Colonization System (1803, first publ. 1812)
- Defence of Usury, &c. London: Payne and Foss, 1816.
  - Bentham wrote a series of thirteen "Letters" addressed to Adam Smith, published in 1787 as Defence of Usury. Bentham's main argument against the restriction is that "projectors" generate positive externalities. G. K. Chesterton identified Bentham's essay on usury as the very beginning of the "modern world". Bentham's arguments were very influential. "Writers of eminence" moved to abolish the restriction, and repeal was achieved in stages and fully achieved in England in 1854. There is little evidence as to Smith's reaction. He did not revise the offending passages in The Wealth of Nations (1776), but Smith made little or no substantial revisions after the third edition of 1784.
- Plan of Parliamentary Reform. London: R. Hunter, 1817.
- Swear Not At All (1817).
- A Table of the Springs of Action. London: R. Hunter, 1817.
- Church-of-Englandism and Its Catechism Examined, &c. &c. London: Effingham Wilson, printed 1817, published 1818.
- The Elements of the Art of Packing, as Applied to Special Juries, Particularly in Cases of Libel Law. London: Effingham Wilson, 1821.
- On the Liberty of the Press, and Public Discussion.^{[a]} London: William Hone, 1821.
  - A collection of four essays directed towards the Spanish public, written September–October 1820.
- Analysis of the Influence of Temporal Happiness, of Mankind. London: R. Charlie, 1822.
  - Written with George Grote.
  - Published under the pseudonym Philip Beauchamp.
- Not Paul, But Jesus. London: John Hunt, 1823.
  - Published under the pseudonym Gamaliel Smith.
- The Book of Fallacies: From Unfinished Papers of Jeremy Bentham. Ed. 1: London: John and H. L. Hunt, 1824.
- A Treatise on Judicial Evidence Extracted from the Manuscripts of Jeremy Bentham, Esq. Edited by Étienne Dumont, translated from French into English. London: Baldwin, Cradock, & Joy, 1825.
- Rationale of Judicial Evidence, Specially Applied to English Practice. London: Hunt and Clarke, 1827 – vol. 1, vol. 2, vol. 3, vol. 4, vol. 5.
- Emancipate Your Colonies! Addressed to the National Convention of France A° 1793.. London: C. and W. Reymell for Robert Heward, 1830.
- Deontology; or, the Science of Morality. Edited by John Bowring. London: Longman, Rees, Orme, Browne, Greene, and Longman; Edinburgh: William Tait, 1834 – vol. 1, vol. 2.

==== Notes ====
a Better scan available through HeinOnline (subscription may be required or content may be available in libraries).

=== Collections ===
On his death, Bentham left manuscripts amounting to an estimated 30 million words, which are now largely held by University College London's Special Collections (c. 60,000 manuscript folios) and the British Library (c. 15,000 folios). University College London also holds a collection of c.500 books either by, about, or owned by Jeremy Bentham. Other material held by UCL includes a list of common subjects (likely by Bentham).

==== Bowring (1838–1843) ====
John Bowring, the young radical writer who had been Bentham's intimate friend and disciple, was appointed his literary executor and charged with the task of preparing a collected edition of his works. This appeared in 11 volumes in 1838–1843. Bowring based much of his edition on previously published texts (including those of Dumont) rather than Bentham's own manuscripts, and elected not to publish Bentham's works on religion at all. The edition was described by the Edinburgh Review on first publication as "incomplete, incorrect and ill-arranged", and has since been repeatedly criticised both for its omissions and for errors of detail; while Bowring's memoir of Bentham's life included in volumes 10 and 11 was described by Sir Leslie Stephen as "one of the worst biographies in the language". Nevertheless, Bowring's remained the standard edition of most of Bentham's writings for over a century, and is still only partially superseded: it includes such interesting writings on international (Note: a word Bentham himself coined) relations as Bentham's A Plan for an Universal and Perpetual Peace written 1786–89, which forms part IV of the Principles of International Law.

==== Stark (1952–1954) ====
In 1952–1954, Werner Stark published a three-volume set, Jeremy Bentham's Economic Writings, in which he attempted to bring together all of Bentham's writings on economic matters, including both published and unpublished material. Although a significant achievement, the work is considered by scholars to be flawed in many points of detail, and a new edition of the economic writings (retitled Writings on Political Economy) is currently in course of publication by the Bentham Project.

==== Bentham Project (1968–present) ====
In 1959, the Bentham Committee was established under the auspices of University College London with the aim of producing a definitive edition of Bentham's writings. It set up the Bentham Project to undertake the task, and the first volume in The Collected Works of Jeremy Bentham was published in 1968. The Collected Works are providing many unpublished works, as well as much-improved texts of works already published. To date, 38 volumes have appeared; the complete edition is projected to total 80. The volume Of Laws in General (1970) was found to contain many errors and has been replaced by Of the Limits of the Penal Branch of Jurisprudence (2010) In 2017, Volumes 1–5 were re-published in open access by UCL Press.

To assist in this task, the Bentham papers at UCL are being digitised by crowdsourcing their transcription. Transcribe Bentham is a crowdsourced manuscript transcription project, run by University College London's Bentham Project, in partnership with UCL's UCL Centre for Digital Humanities, UCL Library Services, UCL Learning and Media Services, the University of London Computer Centre, and the online community. The project was launched in September 2010 and is making freely available, via a specially designed transcription interface, digital images of UCL's vast Bentham Papers collection—which runs to some 60,000 manuscript folios—to engage the public and recruit volunteers to help transcribe the material. Volunteer-produced transcripts will contribute to the Bentham Project's production of the new edition of The Collected Works of Jeremy Bentham, and will be uploaded to UCL's digital Bentham Papers repository, widening access to the collection for all and ensuring its long-term preservation. Manuscripts can be viewed and transcribed by signing-up for a transcriber account at the Transcription Desk, via the Transcribe Bentham website.

Free, flexible textual search of the full collection of Bentham Papers is now possible through an experimental handwritten text image indexing and search system, developed by the PRHLT research center in the framework of the READ project.

== See also ==
- List of animal rights advocates
- List of civil rights leaders
- List of liberal theorists
- Philosophy of happiness – Philosophical theory
- Rule according to higher law – Belief that universal principles of morality override unjust laws
- Rule of law – Political situation in which everyone is subject to the law
