= UCL Centre for Digital Humanities =

Coordinates: 51.523563°N 0.132517°W

- Established: 2010
- Address: UCL Centre for Digital Humanities Department of Information Studies University College London Gower Street London WC1E 6BT
- Location: London, United Kingdom
- Website: UCL Centre for Digital Humanities

The UCL Centre for Digital Humanities is a cross-faculty research centre of University College London. It brings together digital humanities work being done in many of the university's different departments and centres, including the library services, museums and collections. The Centre counts among the "most visible" in the field and facilitates various opportunities for study at post-graduate level, including the MA/MSc in Digital Humanities, doctoral study, and short courses as part of the Department of Information Studies.

== History ==
The centre was opened on 1 February 2010, with a launch party on 20 May. At the launch party the inaugural Centre for Digital Humanities Lecture was given by James Murdoch, the EMEA Chief Executive Officer of News Corporation. The speech attracted considerable media coverage due to its criticism of the British Library's plans to digitise its national newspaper collection.

The centre was introduced to the Digital Humanities community at large by Melissa Terras in her keynote address at the Digital Humanities conference in London on 10 July.

The centre hosts the annual Susan Hockey lecture series, which was inaugurated in May 2015.

== Research ==
A number of research projects at UCL are associated with UCLDH:

- Archaeology of Reading in Early Modern Europe - this new digital humanities research initiative explores historical reading practices through the lens of manuscript annotations preserved in early printed books.
- Assyrian Empire Builders and State Archives of Assyria Online - study the mechanisms of communication between the top levels of authority in an ancient empire.
- CELM: Catalogue of English Literary Manuscripts - is preparing a free on-line record of surviving manuscript sources for over 200 major British authors of the period 1450–1700.
- DHOER: Digital Humanities Open Educational Resources - is creating a range of introductory Digital Humanities teaching materials and making them freely available.
- Digital Lives - focuses on personal digital archives and their relationship with research repositories.
- eSAD: e-Science and Ancient Documents - aims to use computing technologies to aid experts in reading ancient documents.
- Humanities Information Practices - studies the range of information behaviors in the humanities.
- INKE: Implementing New Knowledge Environments - proposes to design new digital environments for reading and research in the humanities, and for the general public.
- LinkSphere - is creating a single virtual interface for searching across the repositories and collections held by the University of Reading.
- Livingstone Online provides access to the medical and scientific writings of the missionary, doctor and African explorer David Livingstone (1813–1873).
- Open Learning Environment for Early Modern Low Countries History - aims to turn a comprehensive survey course in Early Modern Low Countries history into an educational online resource.
- Reassembling the Thera Frescoes - assists archaeologists and conservators by digitising excavated fragments of wall paintings which have been preserved in volcanic ash since the sixteenth century BCE.
- Mapping Sitelines - studies how rapid map authoring can support recovery after brain injury.
- TEI by Example - is developing an online resource for teaching TEI (Text Encoding Initiative).
- The Bentham Project is preparing a new definitive edition of The Collected Works of Jeremy Bentham, the utilitarian philosopher, jurist, economist, political theorist and social reformer.
- Transcribe Bentham - an effort to aid the transcription of Jeremy Bentham's work by allowing volunteers to contribute.
- The E Curator project - explores the use of 3D colour scanning and e-Science technologies to capture and share very large 3D colour scans and detailed datasets about museum artefacts in a secure computing environment.

== See also ==
- Digital Classicist
