= David Yale =

British legal historian (1928–2021)

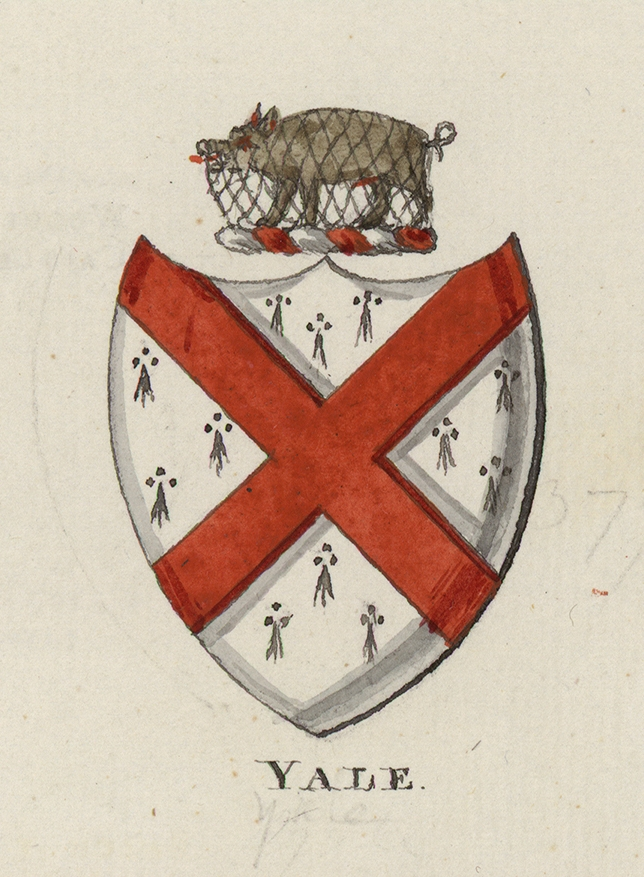
Coat of arms of David Yale's grandfather, Col. James Corbet Yale of Plas-yn-Yale, their ancestral seat

David Eryl Corbet Yale, FBA, Hon. QC (31 March 1928 – 26 June 2021) was a scholar in the history of English law. He became Queen's Counsel at the same time as Nelson Mandela, and became president of the Selden Society. He was also a reader in English legal history at Cambridge University from 1969 to 1993, and a life fellow at Christ's College, Cambridge from 1950 until his death.

== Early life ==
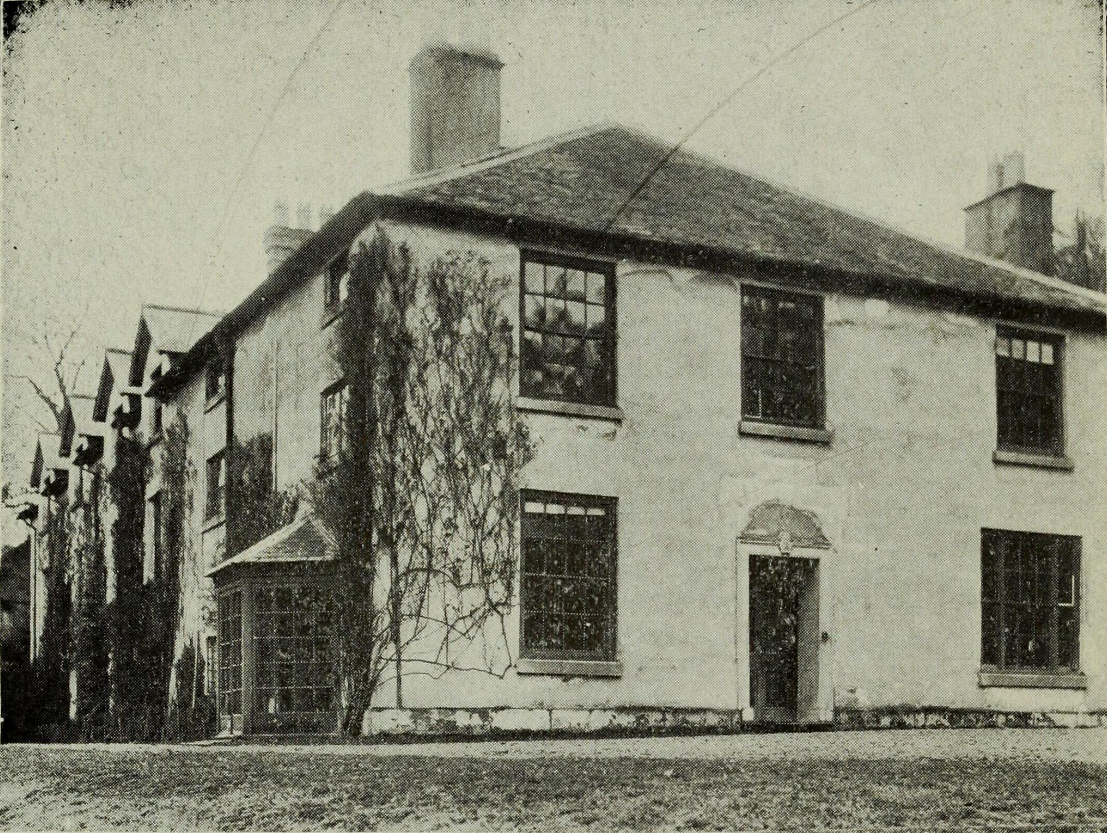
Plas yn Yale (Plas yn Ial), Wales, modern structure, past mansion was demolished

The son of Lt. Col. John Corbet Yale of the British Hong Kong Garrison and Beatrice Breese, David Yale was raised in British India and educated at Queens' College, Cambridge, where he studied law. His maternal grandfather was Major Charles Breese (MP), Parliamentary Private Secretary to H. A. L. Fisher, the brother-in-law of Sir Francis Darwin, son of Charles Darwin. His grandfather's family included MP David Williams of Castell Deudraeth, Sir Osmond Williams, 1st Baronet, the constable of Harlech Castle, and Dr. Leonard Williams.

His paternal grandfather, Colonel James Corbet Yale, son of Deputy Lieutenant William Corbet Yale, commanded the Hong Kong and Singapore Royal Artillery, lived at Plas yn Yale, Wales, and was a member of the family of Lt. Gen. Sir Love Parry Jones-Parry and Maj. Gen. Clapham of Widcombe Manor. He inherited Plas-yn-Yale from the line of Rev. John Yale of Cambridge University. David Yale was a member of the Yale family of Wales, who were historically the proprietors of the Lordship of Bromfield and Yale in North East Wales.

As he approached 18, he decided that he must go to Queens' College at Cambridge University after the discoveries of his great-uncle who was keen on genealogies. He had discovered a couple of ancestors who in the 16th century had worked their way from Wales to Cambridge, inspiring him to do the same. Upon graduating in 1949 with a starred first and then completing a postgraduate LLB in 1950, he was elected a fellow at Christ's College, Cambridge. He was a lecturer at the University of Cambridge from 1952 until his promotion to a readership in 1969.

In 1961, while on his first sabbatical leave, he spent a year in New Haven, Connecticut with his wife Elizabeth Ann Brett. He went to Yale University as a visiting professor, where he had been invited by the Dean of Yale Law School, Eugene V. Rostow, later Under Secretary of State for President Lyndon B. Johnson. The Dean's brother, Walt Rostow, was the National Security Advisor of John F. Kennedy.

== Career ==
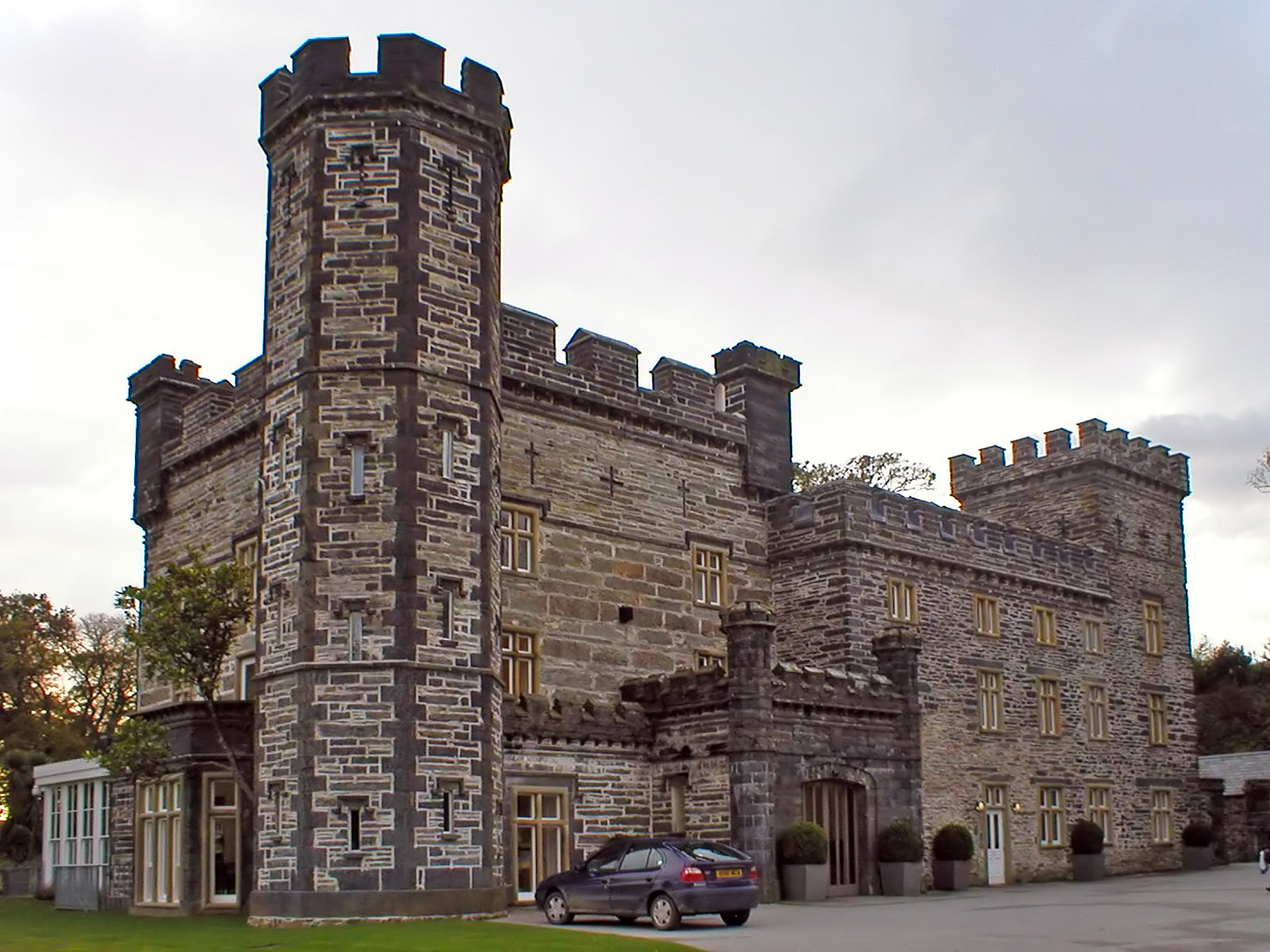
Castell Deudraeth, a Welsh castle belonging to the cousin of David Yale's grandfather Charles Breese, named David Williams, Member of Parliament

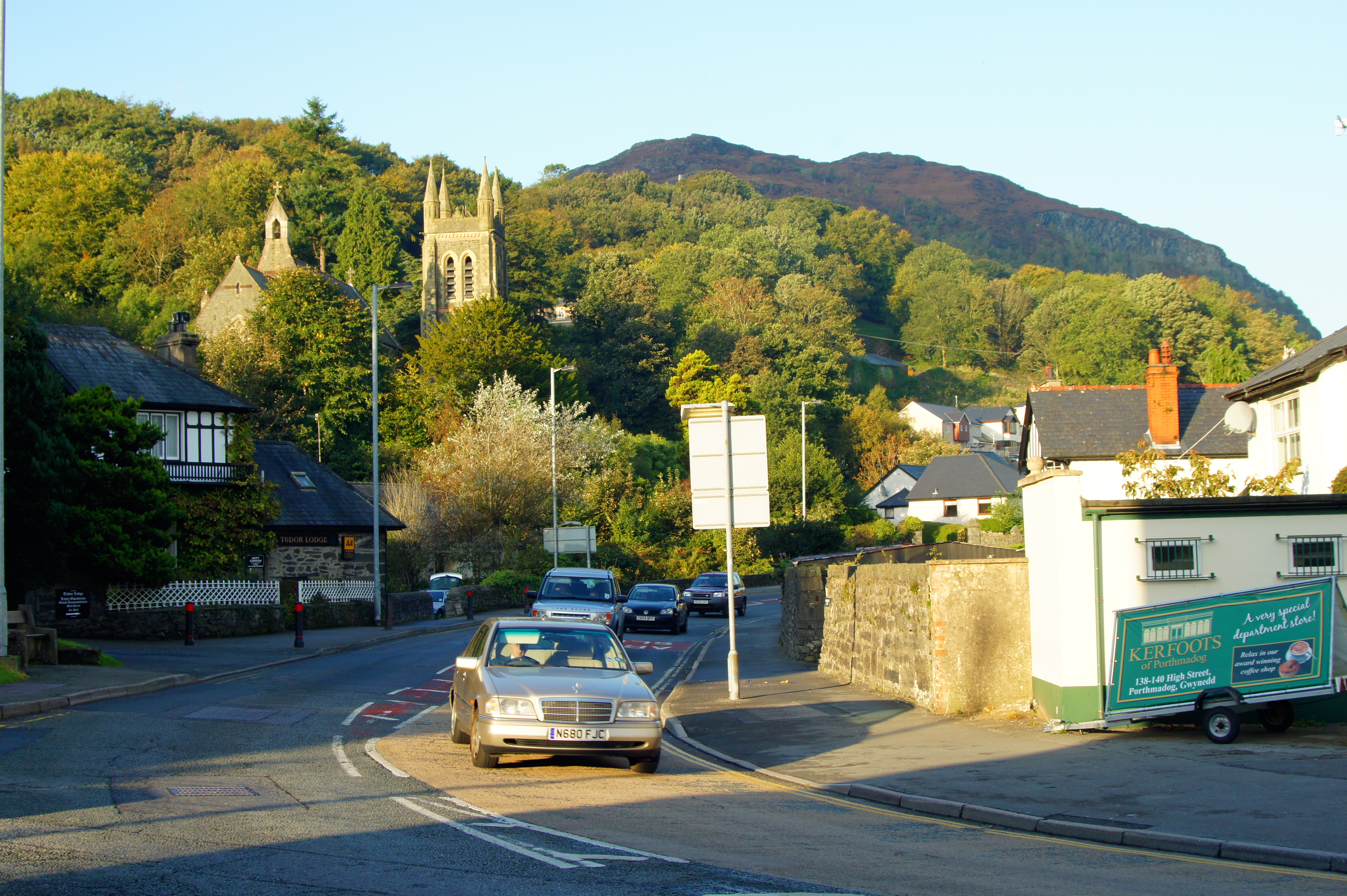
Porthmadog in Snowdonia, where Yale retired

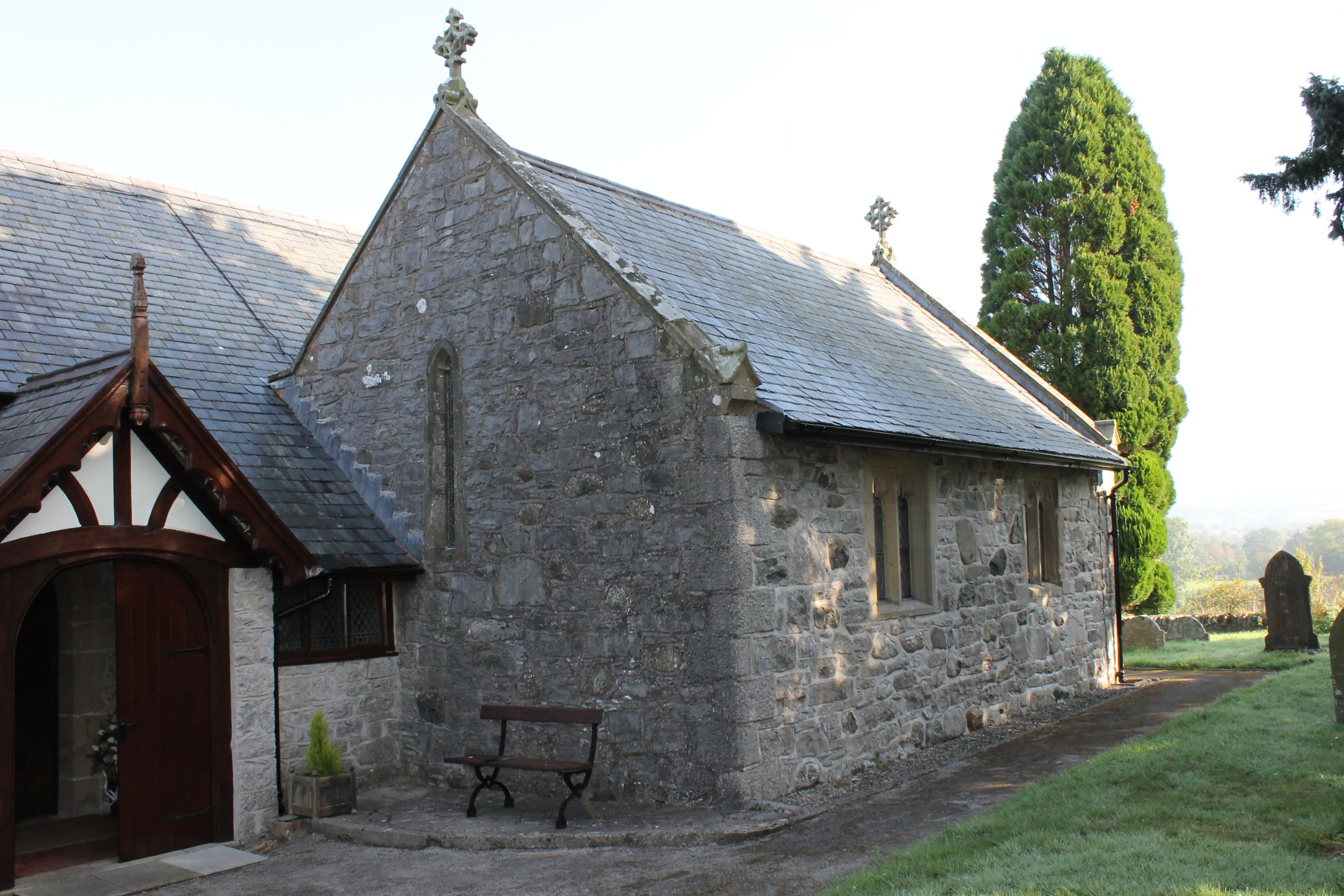
Tudor era "Yale Chapel", built by Dr. Thomas Yale in 1575, Col. James Corbet Yale was buried there

Yale became vice-master of Christ's College at Cambridge from 1973 to 1977, Praelector from 1980 to 1982, and served on Cambridge University Council and the Senate. He became Editor of the Cambridge Law Journal in 1974, replacing Jack Hamson, and chairman of the Faculty of Law in 1976. The job of editor was first proposed to Stanley Alexander de Smith. As a chairman on the committee, he worked with Patrick Devlin, Lord Devlin, on the university statutes, and was an expert on Admiralty Court laws.

He was involved in a case concerning the discovery by divers of the shipwrecks from the Spanish Armada of 1588, and had to advise the Foreign Office about the contents of the Spanish galleon on the coast of Ireland. The issue concerned whether or not the gold and silver recovered from the wreck was disposable by law, or if it was still property of the Spanish government, or the property of a deceased Spanish Admiral.

He was elected to the Council of the Selden Society in 1962, and later, literary director and president of this institution (the latter from 1994 to 1997), and worked with Stroud Francis Charles Milsom and Sir John Baker. For the centenary celebrations of the Selden Society in 1987, he and other members had a dinner with Prince Philip, Duke of Edinburgh who was present as a patron for the society.

In 1999 the Selden Society instituted the David Yale Prize in his honour, awarded biennially to a young scholar (under the age of 35) for a distinguished contribution to the laws and legal institutions of England and Wales.

Yale was elected a Fellow of the British Academy in 1980 and was appointed an honorary Queen's Counsel by Elizabeth II for England and Wales in 2000, next to Nelson Mandela, who was also receiving his Queen's Counsel, and two others. The Queen had to confer a special permission to the House of Lords for Mandela to receive his honorary Queen's Counsel as he wasn't a senior barrister in Britain.

In 2009, Yale became Master of the Bench of the Inner Temple in Temple, London, named after the Knight Templars. Past members have included Mahatma Gandhi, John Maynard Keynes and Sir Francis Drake. In the early 2000s, he was involved in an arbitration case about the Lordship of Bromfield and Yale, regarding the rights of the family of Gerald Grosvenor, 6th Duke of Westminster and the Grosvenor Estate.

During the 17th century, King Charles I of the House of Stuart had given the rights to all mine and minerals within the old Lordship, and there was a contention between the Crown Estate and the family. He worked on the side of the Grosvenors and the whole thing was settled through a settlement sum made by the Crown to the family.

He retired at Porthmadog in Snowdonia and died on 26 June 2021, at the age of 93.
