= Ames Foundation =

- Formation: 1910
- Founder: Friends of James Barr Ames
- Purpose: "Continuing the advancement of legal knowledge and aiding the improvement of the law".
- President: Christine Desan
- Website: Official website

The Ames Foundation was founded in 1910 by friends of James Barr Ames with the aim of "continuing the advancement of legal knowledge and aiding the improvement of the law". The Harvard Law Library of Harvard Law School partnered with the Ames Foundation "to create a publicly-available digital library of important materials in legal history."

== History ==
The Ames Foundation was founded in 1910. In 1912, the foundation was incorporated as 501(c)(3) organization.

== Directors and Officers ==
- Christine Desan - president (Harvard Law School)
- Charles Donahue, Jr. - vice-president and Literary Director (Harvard Law School)
- Daniel R. Coquillette - treasurer-clerk (Boston College School of Law)
- William Alford - director (Harvard Law School)
- Mary Ann Glendon - director (Harvard Law School)
- Andrew J. Kaufman - director (Harvard Law School)
- Randall Kennedy - director (Harvard Law School)
- Kenneth W. Mack - director (Harvard Law School)
- Harry S. Martin, III - director (Harvard Law School)
- Martha Minow - director (Harvard Law School)
- David Seipp -director (Boston University Law School)
- David Warrington - director (Harvard Law School)
