= Hamlyn Lectures =

The Hamlyn Lectures are a series of public lectures in England, Scotland, Wales and Northern Ireland given annually on a legal topic. The lectures have been given every year since 1949 in memory of Emma Hamlyn 's father William Bussell Hamlyn.

== History ==
The Hamlyn Trust was established in 1948 by the 1939 will of Emma Warburton Hamlyn in memory of her father, William Bussell Hamlyn, a solicitor and JP in Torquay. Emma Hamlyn had travelled widely and was intrigued by the relation between each country and their laws. Her mother, Emma Gorsuch Warburton, had died in 1913 and her father died in 1919. After this she spent the last twenty years at her home in Ilsham reading and receiving visitors.

The trust was to further

among the Common People of this Country of the knowledge of the Comparative Jurisprudence and the Ethnology of the Chief European countries including our own and the circumstances of the growth of such Jurisprudence to the intent that the Common People of our Country may realise the privileges which in law and custom they enjoy in comparison with other European Peoples and realising and appreciating such privileges may recognize the responsibilities and obligations attaching to them.

Initially there was doubt as to whether the trust was valid, but the High Court approved a scheme for the administration of the trust in 1948, which followed closely the wording of the will.

The lectures became popular after Lord Denning delivered the first one and others agreed to follow his example.

== List of Hamlyn Lectures ==
Year	Lecturer	Title
1949	Sir Alfred Denning	Freedom Under the Law
1950	Richard O'Sullivan	The Inheritance of the Common Law
1951	F. H. Lawson	The Rational Strength of English Law
1952	A. L. Goodhart	English Law and the Moral Law
1953	Sir Carleton Kemp Allen	The Queen's Peace
1954	C. J. Hamson	Executive Discretion and Judicial Control: An Aspect of the French Conseil d'Etat
1955	Glanville Williams	The Proof of Guilt: A Study of the English Criminal Trial
1956	Sir Patrick Devlin	Trial by Jury
1957	Lord MacDermott	Protection from Power under English Law
1958	Sir David Hughes Parry	The Sanctity of Contracts in English Law
1959	C. H. S. Fifoot	Judge and Jurist in the Reign of Victoria
1960	M. C. Setalvad	The Common Law in India
1961	T. B. Smith	British Justice: The Scottish Contribution
1962	R. E. Megarry	Lawyer and Litigant in England
1963	Baroness Wootton of Abinger	Crime and the Criminal Law: Reflections of a Magistrate and Social Scientist
1964	Erwin N. Griswold	Law and Lawyers in the United States: The Common Law Under Stress
1965	Lord Tangley	New Law for a New World?
1966	Lord Kilbrandon	Other People's Law
1967	O. D. Schreiner	The Contribution of English Law to South African Law; and the Rule of Law in South Africa
1968	Harry Street	Justice in the Welfare State
1969	Bora Laskin	The British Tradition in Canadian Law
1970	Henry Cecil	The English Judge
1971	Rupert Cross	Punishment, Prison and the Public: An Assessment of Penal Reform in Twentieth Century England by an Armchair Penologist
1972	Otto Kahn-Freund	Labour and the Law
1973	K. C. Wheare	Maladministration and its Remedies
1974	Sir Leslie Scarman	English Law—The New Dimension
1975	Sir Desmond Heap	The Land and the Development; or, the Turmoil and the Torment
1976	Sir Robert Micklethwait	The National Insurance Commissioners
1977	Lord Mackenzie Stuart	The European Communities and the Rule of Law
1978	Sir Norman Anderson	Liberty, Law and Justice
1979	O. R. McGregor	Social History and Law Reform
1980	H. W. R. Wade	Constitutional Fundamentals
1981	Hubert Monroe	Intolerable Inquisition? Reflections on the Law of Tax
1982	Tony Honoré	The Quest for Security: Employees, Tenants, Wives
1983	Lord Hailsham of St. Marylebone	Hamlyn Revisited: The British Legal System Today
1984	Sir Gordon Borrie	The Development of Consumer Law and Policy—Bold Spirits and Timorous Souls
1985	Ralf Dahrendorf	Law and Order
1986	Sir Jack I. H. Jacob	The Fabric of English Civil Justice
1987	P. S. Atiyah	Pragmatism and Theory in English Law
1988	J. C. Smith	Justification and Excuse in the Criminal Law
1989	Sir Harry Woolf	Protection of the Public—A New Challenge
1990	Claire Palley	The United Kingdom and Human Rights
1991	Sir Gordon Slynn	Introducing a European Legal Order
1992	Richard Abel	Speech and Respect
1993	Lord Mackay of Clashfern	The Administration of Justice
1994	William Twining	Blackstone's Tower: The English Law School
1995	Dame Brenda Hale	From the Tube to the Coffin: Choice and Regulation in Private Life
1996	Lord Cooke of Thorndon	Turning Points of the Common Law
1997	Roy Goode	Commercial Law in the Next Millennium
1998	Sir Stephen Sedley	Freedom, Law and Justice
1999	Michael Zander	The State of Justice
2000	Anthony King	Does the United Kingdom Still Have a Constitution?
2001	Andrew Ashworth	Human Rights, Serious Crime and Criminal Procedure
2002	Baroness Kennedy of the Shaws	Legal Conundrums in our Brave New World
2003	Michael Kirby	Judicial Activism: Authority, Principle and Policy in the Judicial Method
2004	Sir Bob Hepple	Rights at Work: Global, European and British Perspectives
2005	Conor Gearty	Can Human Rights Survive?
2006	Sir Francis Jacobs	The Sovereignty of Law: The European Way
2007	Nicola Lacey	The Prisoners' Dilemma: Political Economy and Punishment in Contemporary Democracies
2008	Dame Hazel Genn	Judging Civil Justice
2009	Lord Bingham of Cornhill	Widening Horizons: The Influence of Comparative Law and International Law on Domestic Law
2010	Alan Paterson	Lawyers and the Public Good: Democracy in Action?
2011	Jeremy Waldron	The Rule of Law and the Measure of Property
2012	Jack Straw	Aspects of Law Reform: An Insider's Perspective
2013	Sir John Laws	The Common Law Constitution
2014	Paul Craig	UK, EU and Global Administrative Law: Foundations and Challenges
2015	Michael Freeman	A Magna Carta for Children? Rethinking Children's Rights
2016	Dame Sian Elias	Golden Threads and Pragmatic Patches: Fairness in Criminal Justice
2017	Andrew Burrows	Thinking about Statutes: Interpretation, Interaction, Improvement
2018	Robin Allen QC	Why does Equality seem so difficult? Three problems in comparison.
2019	Professor Sir John Baker	English Law under two Elizabeths
2020	Eleanor Sharpston QC (delivered online)	The Great Experiment: Constructing a European Union under the Rule of Law from a Group of Diverse Sovereign States
2021	Lord Pannick QC	Advocacy
2022	Professor Catherine O’Regan	Courts and the Body Politic
2023	Lord Thomas of Cwmgiedd	Laws for a nation and laws for transnational commerce. Where is the line drawn?
2024	Professor Richard Moorhead	Frail professionalism
2025	Professor Dame Sarah Worthington DBE	The Paradoxes of Property Law
