= Charles Donahue =

Charles Donahue may refer to:

- Charles Donahue (judge) (1877–1952), justice of the Massachusetts Supreme Judicial Court
- Charles Donahue (legal scholar) (born 1941), American legal scholar and historian
- She Donahue (Charles Michael Donahue, 1877–1947), Major League Baseball player
