= Paul McHugh =

Paul McHugh may refer to:

- Paul McHugh (legal scholar), New Zealand academic lawyer
- Paul R. McHugh (born 1931), American psychiatrist, researcher, and educator
- Paul McHugh (cyclist) (born 1967), English cyclist
