= Selden Society =

English legal history society

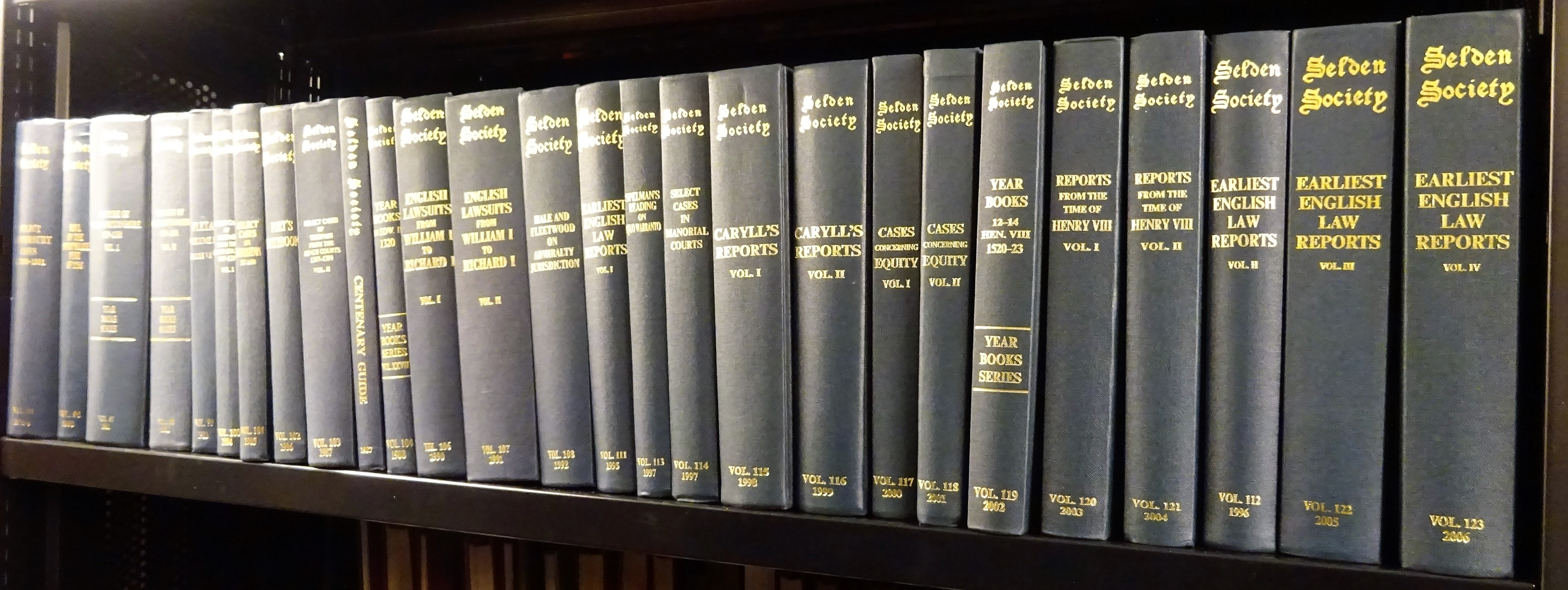
- Selden Society volumes
- Formation: 1887
- Founder: Frederic William Maitland
- Type: Learned society
- Registration no.: 211536
- Legal status: Charity
- Purpose: Historical and Legal Study and Research
- Headquarters: London, United Kingdom
- Activities: Research & Publications, Lectures & Events
- Collections: Library, Archives
- Patron: King Charles III
- President: Donald Cryan
- Website: seldensociety.ac.uk

The Selden Society is a learned society and registered charity concerned with the study of English legal history. It functions primarily as a text publication society, but also undertakes other activities to promote scholarship within its sphere of interest. It is the only learned society wholly devoted to the topic of English legal history.

The society takes its name from the eminent English jurist and legal and constitutional scholar, John Selden (1584–1654).

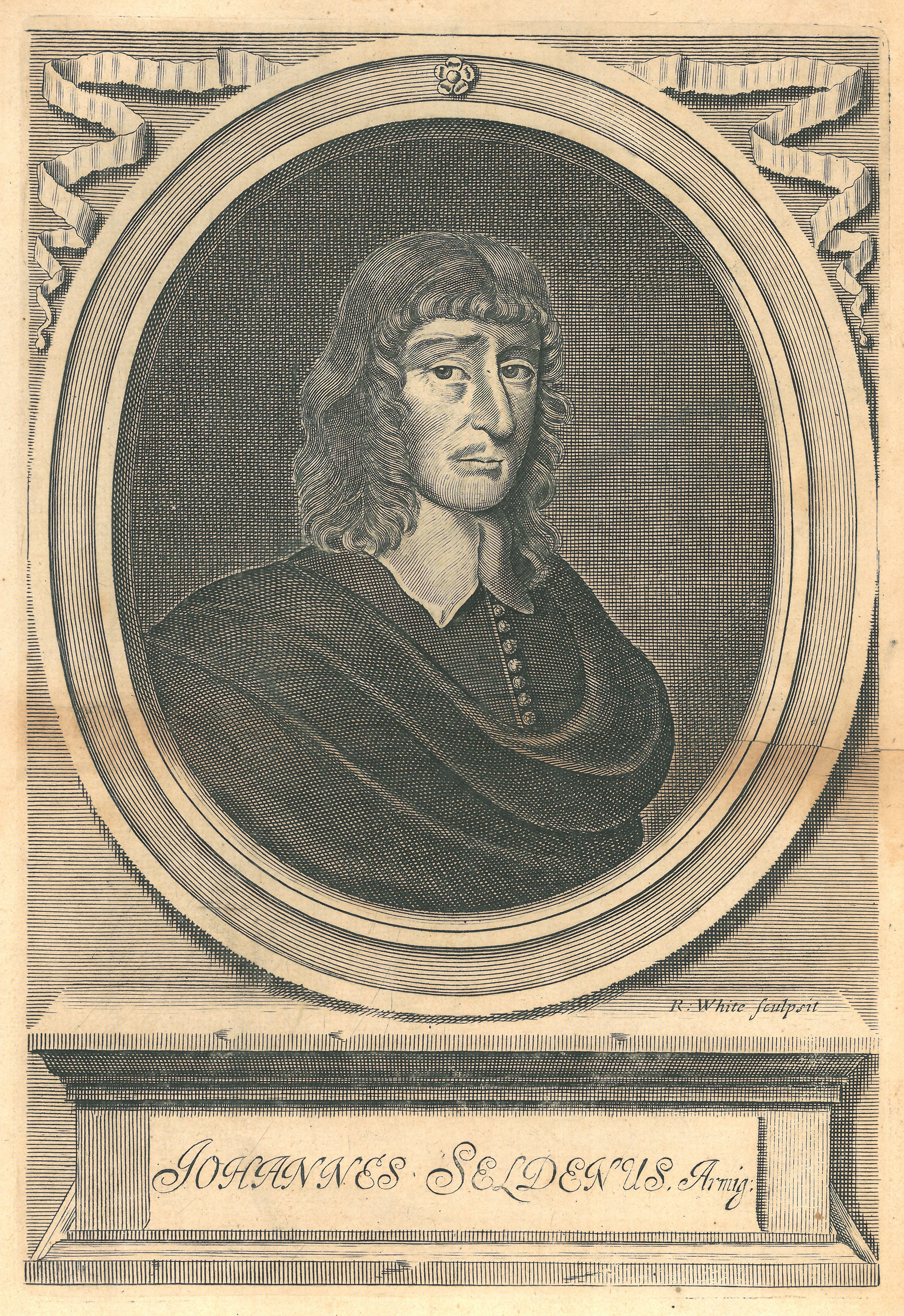
John Selden (1584–1654), after whom the society is named

== History and activities ==
The society was founded in 1887 by a group which included F. W. Maitland, who served as its first literary editor and personally edited eight volumes for the Society. The Society's first years were rocky: its treasurer, P. E. Dove, committed suicide in 1894, leaving behind a deficit of £1,000.

Its principal activity is publishing historical records of English law. Since its inception, a volume of significant texts has been published every year. It also publishes a supplementary series.

The current president is Donald Cryan. The current literary director is Neil Jones, who succeeded Sir John Baker in this role in 2011. The secretary is Michael Lobban, Professor of Legal History at the London School of Economics. The society meets for an annual general meeting every year, and other meetings are held in the United States and Australia. It often collaborates with the Ames Foundation at Harvard Law School.

Membership of the society is open to anyone worldwide upon payment of a fee, and is primarily composed of educational institutions and interested individuals (mostly legal historians and lawyers).

== Publications ==
Early volumes published by the society include:

- Maitland, F. W., ed. (1888). Select Pleas of the Crown. Vol. I: A.D. 1200–1225. Selden Society Publications. Vol. 1.
- Maitland, F. W., ed. (1889). Select Pleas in Manorial and other Seignorial Courts. Vol. I: Reigns of Henry III and Edward I. Selden Society Publications. Vol. 2.
- Paley Baildon, William, ed. (1890). Select Civil Pleas. Vol. I: A.D. 1200–1203. Selden Society Publications. Vol. 3.

This volume made use of record type, in an attempt to present the text in a near facsimile of the original manuscript sources. F. W. Maitland expressed reservations about the experiment, and it was not repeated.

- Maitland, F. W.; Paley Baildon, William, eds. (1891). The Court Baron; being precedents for use in seignorial and other courts, together with select pleas from the Bishop of Ely's Court at Littleport. Selden Society Publications. Vol. 4.
- Hudson, W., ed. (1892). Leet Jurisdiction in the City of Norwich during the 13th and 14th centuries, with a short notice of its later history and decline, from rolls in the possession of the corporation. Selden Society Publications. Vol. 5.

Volumes published in recent years include:

- Brand, Paul A., ed. (2006). The Earliest English Law Reports. Vol. III: Eyre reports to 1285. Selden Society Publications. Vol. 122. ISBN 0-85423-200-1.
- Brand, Paul A., ed. (2006). The Earliest English Law Reports. Vol. IV: Eyre reports to 1286 and undated Eyre reports; Exchequer of the Jews reports; Pre-1290 Assize reports; Pre-1290 Reports from unidentified courts and additional pre-1290 Common Bench reports. Selden Society Publications. Vol. 123. ISBN 0-85423-200-1.
- Baker, Sir John, ed. (2007). The Reports of William Dalison, 1552–1558. Selden Society Publications. Vol. 124. ISBN 978-0-85423-210-9.
- Lyall, Andrew, ed. (2009). Irish Exchequer Reports. Reports of cases in the Courts of Exchequer and Chancery in Ireland, 1716–1734. Selden Society Publications. Vol. 125. ISBN 978-0-85423-126-3.
- Millon, David, ed. (2009). Select Ecclesiastical Cases from the King's Courts, 1272–1307. Selden Society Publications. Vol. 126. ISBN 9780854231270.
- Helmholz, R. H., ed. (2011). Three Civilian Notebooks, 1580–1640. Selden Society Publications. Vol. 127. ISBN 978-0-85423-128-7.
- Oldham, James, ed. (2013). Case Notes of Sir Souldern Lawrence, 1787–1800. Selden Society Publications. Vol. 128. ISBN 978-0-85423-125-6.
- Baker, Sir John, ed. (2015). Selected Readings and Commentaries on Magna Carta, 1400–1604. Selden Society Publications. Vol. 132. ISBN 978-0854232222.
- McGlynn, Margaret, ed. (2016). The Rights and Liberties of the English Church: readings from the pre-Reformation Inns of Court. Selden Society Publications. Vol. 129. ISBN 9780854232215.
- Bonfield, Lloyd; Poos, L. R., eds. (2017). Reports of Sir Peter King, Chief Justice of the Common Pleas, 1714–22. Selden Society Publications. Vol. 130. ISBN 978-0854232284.
- Lobban, Michael, ed. (2019). Jeffrey Gilbert on Property and Contract. Selden Society Publications. Vol. 134/135. ISBN 9780854232291. (2 vols)

== Yale Prize ==
The David Yale Prize is awarded every other year to a young scholar (who has been engaged in research for no more than about 10 years) for an outstanding contribution to the laws and legal institutions of England and Wales. The award was set up in 1999 in honour of David Yale, FBA, Hon. Q.C., former President of the Selden Society. The prize has been awarded to:

- 1999 Thomas P. Gallanis for his article "The Rise of Modern Evidence Law"
- 2001 Daniel Klerman for his article "Settlement and the Decline of Private Prosecution in Thirteenth-Century England"
- 2003 Neil Jones for his article "The Use Upon a Use in Equity Revisited"
- 2007 Sara Elin Roberts for her book The Legal Triads of Medieval Wales (2007)
- 2013 Ian Williams
- 2017 Kenneth F. Duggan for his article "The Hue and Cry in Thirteenth-Century England" and Sean Bottomley for his book The English Patent System during the Industrial Revolution, 1700–1852 (2014) (joint winners)

== Patrons and officers ==
=== Patrons ===
- 1887: Queen Victoria
- 1895: The Prince Wales (afterward King Edward VII)
- 1895: The Duke of York (afterward King George V)
- 1895: Thomas F. Bayard
- 1901: King Edward VII
- 1910: King George V
- 1923: The Prince of Wales (afterward King Edward VIII)
- 1936: King Edward VIII
- 1937: King George VI
- 1952: The Duke of Edinburgh
- 2024: King Charles III

=== Officers ===
==== Presidents ====
- 1887: The Lord Coleridge
- 1895: The Lord Herschell
- 1898: Sir Nathaniel Lindley
- 1901: The Lord Macnaghten
- 1904: The Lord Alverstone
- 1907: Sir Robert Romer
- 1910: Walter Charles Renshaw
- 1913: The Viscount Haldane
- 1916: The Lord Parker of Waddington
- 1919: The Lord Sumner
- 1922: Sir Thomas Rolls Warrington
- 1925: The Viscount Cave
- 1928: The Lord Hanworth
- 1931: The Lord Atkin
- 1934: The Lord Tomlin
- 1935: Sir George John Talbot
- 1936: The Lord Wright
- 1940: Sir Wilfrid Arthur Greene
- 1943: Sir Malcolm Martin Macnaghten
- 1946: The Lord Uthwatt
- 1949: Sir Cyril Thomas Flower
- 1952: Sir Harry Bevir Vaisey
- 1955: Sir Walter Leslie Farrer
- 1958: Sir Cecil Thomas Carr
- 1961: Sir Gerald Ritchie Upjohn
- 1964: Arthur Lehman Goodhart
- 1967: Sir Eric George Molyneux Fletcher
- 1970: The Lord Diplock
- 1973: Sir Richard William Southern
- 1976: Sir Robert Edgar Megarry
- 1979: Sir Godfrey William Rowland Morley
- 1982: Geoffrey Rudolph Elton
- 1985: Stroud Francis Charles Milsom
- 1988: Sir Ernest Irvine Goulding
- ...
- 1994: David Eryl Corbet Yale
- 2018: Nicholas Peter Le Poidevin
- 2022: Donald Michael Cryan

== Bibliography ==
- Kiralfy, A. K. R.; Jones, Gareth H. (1960). Selden Society: General Guide to the Society's Publications: a detailed and indexed summary of the contents of the introductions, volumes 1–79. London: Selden Society.
- Kiralfy, A. K. R.; Jones, Gareth H. (1987). Yale, D. E. C.; Baker, J. H. (eds.). A Centenary Guide to the Publications of the Selden Society (2nd ed.). London: Selden Society. OCLC 606070691.
