= Cecil Carr =

English lawyer (1878–1966)

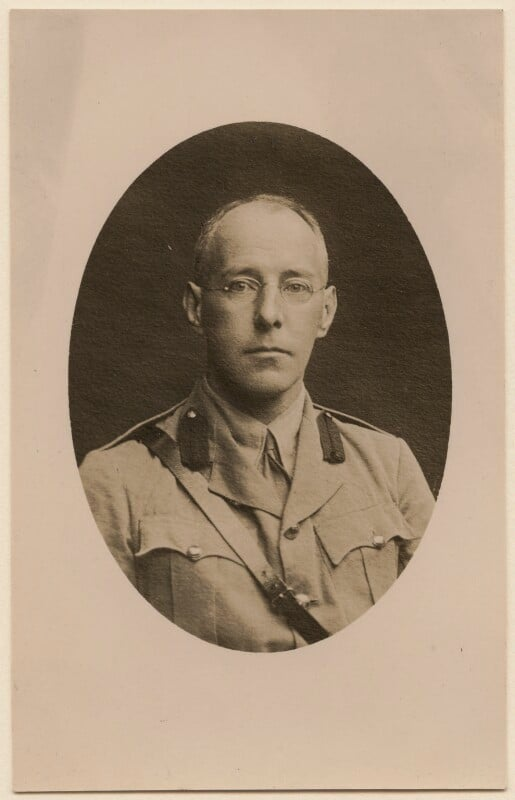
Carr, 1914–1919

Sir Cecil Thomas Carr, KCB, QC, FBA (4 August 1878 – 12 May 1966) was an English lawyer. As well as serving as Counsel to the Speaker of the House of Commons from 1943 to 1955, he was a key figure in the establishment of English administrative law.

== Early life ==
The son of a cloth manufacturer, Carr was born in 1878. He attended Bath College and Trinity College, Cambridge, graduating in 1901 after completing part II of the law Tripos. Carr was called to the bar in 1902 but his practice remained small, giving him time to study. He won the Yorke Prize in 1902 and 1905, published books on the law of corporations (1905) and collective ownership (1907), and edited a volume of trading company charters for the Selden Society (1913). His work was interrupted by his service as a staff officer in India during the First World War.

== Administrative law, official appointments and honours ==
In 1919, Carr left the army and was appointed assistant to the editor of Revised Statutes and the Statutory Rules and Orders series. He became editor in 1923, serving for twenty years. He thereby became a pioneer of the study of administrative law, and published Delegated Legislation in 1921. He travelled to the United States in 1935 to advise on the establishment of the Federal Register (which appeared the next year). In 1940, he was Carpentier Lecturer at Columbia University and the following year authored Concerning English Administrative Law. In 1943 he was appointed Counsel to the Speaker of the House of Commons and retired in 1955; he was also chairman of the Statute Law Committee from 1943 to 1947 (and a committee member until 1965).

Carr had been knighted in 1939, appointed a King's Counsel in 1945 and a Knight Commander of the Order of the Bath in 1947, and elected fellow of the British Academy in 1952. In 1920, he was awarded the LLD degree by the University of Cambridge. He also held three honorary doctorates and was president of the Seldon Society (1958–61). He died in 1966; he was survived by his wife, Norah, daughter of Sir Alexander Binnie.
