= Frank-marriage =

Obsolete marriage-gift under English law

Frank-marriage, maritagium or liberum maritagium was a form of conditional marriage-gift of land under English law, often from father to daughter. It was classed as a type of fee tail.

In early medieval England land could be given to a bride on her marriage with the intent that it should descend to the children of the marriage to help set up the new family. Since land given in fee absolute (outright) was at risk of ultimately passing to collateral heirs or being sold or given away (alienation), it was common practice to ensure that the land remained with the direct heirs by giving it instead in frank-marriage (in liberum maritagium). Under this system, the donor's daughter and later the children of the marriage would hold the land for three generations free of all feudal services, with the donor or his heirs being able to recover it in the event that the direct family line ended during that period. If the family line survived for three generations, the land would convert to fee simple.

Typically, the three-generation rule was not explicitly stated in charters of gift, but apparently grew out of twelfth-century custom. By the middle of the thirteenth-century, there were concerns that the rule whereby the donor or his heirs could recover the land if the family line failed were proving ineffective. In 1258 the barons unsuccessfully petitioned the king complaining that nothing was being done to prevent widows without heirs from selling land granted to them in maritagium to third parties.

Frank-marriage was first recognised in the reign of Henry II, and became the most common kind of marriage settlement up to the reign of Elizabeth I.

== Bibliography ==
- Pollock, Frederick; Maitland, Frederic William (1898). The History of English Law Before the Time of Edward I. Vol. II (2nd ed.). Indianapolis: Republished 2010 by Liberty Fund. ISBN 978-1-61487-849-0. OCLC 820841850.
- Baker, John, ed. (2010). Baker and Milsom's Sources of English Legal History : Private Law to 1750 (2nd ed.). Oxford: Oxford University Press. ISBN 978-0-19-188245-6. OCLC 1120111700.
- Baker, John (2019). Introduction to English Legal History (5th ed.). Oxford: Oxford University Press. ISBN 978-0-19-254073-7. OCLC 1090029126.
