= Sven Beckert =

German-American historian

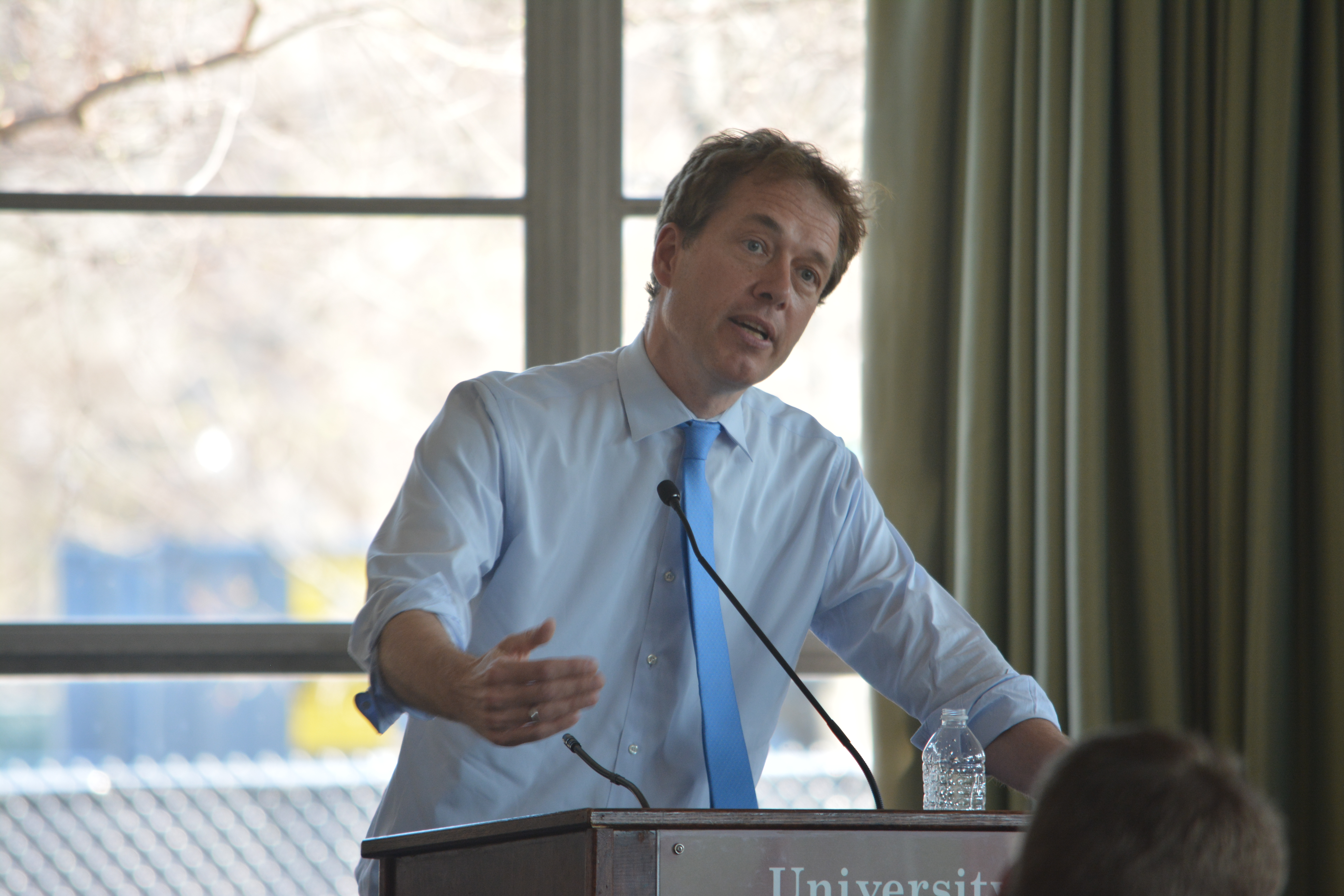
- Beckert speaking at University of Massachusetts Amherst in 2016
- Born: 1965 (age 60–61); Frankfurt, West Germany
- Spouse: Lisa McGirr
- Children: 2

Academic background
- Education: University of Hamburg, Columbia University

Academic work
- Institutions: Harvard University
- Website: https://www.svenbeckert.com/

Sven Beckert is a German-American historian who is the Laird Bell Professor of History at Harvard University, where he teaches the history of the United States in the nineteenth century, and global history. With Christine A. Desan, he is the co-director of the Program on the Study of Capitalism at Harvard University.

He was an American Council of Learned Societies Fellow in 2008. He was a Freiburg Institute for Advanced Studies Fellow. He was a New York Public Library Fellow. He is a Guggenheim Fellow.

== Early and personal life ==
He studied history, economics and political science at the University of Hamburg, Germany and then graduated from Columbia University with a PhD in History.

Beckert is married to Lisa McGirr, a fellow history professor at Harvard. They have two children.

== Career ==
In 2003, Beckert worked at the University of Konstanz as a Humboldt Research Fellow.

In 2020, an honoree of the Great Immigrants Award named by Carnegie Corporation of New York.

== Works ==
Beckert's first book was The Monied Metropolis: New York City and the Consolidation of the American Bourgeoisie, 1850–1896 (2001). Beckert would go on to author the Empire of Cotton: A Global History (2014), which won the 2015 Bancroft Prize and was a finalist for the 2015 Pulitzer Prize for History. The New York Times called it "one of the ten best books of 2015." Economic historian Peer Vries wrote that it was "a must read for every historian interested in global history, but in my view it is better as a story on cotton than as an analysis of capitalism." Other economic historians have criticized the book.

Beckert published his third book, Capitalism: A Global History in 2025.

== Comaroff petition ==
In February 2022, Beckert was one of 38 Harvard faculty to sign an open letter published in The Harvard Crimson defending Professor John Comaroff after a university investigation found that he had violated the Harvard's sexual and professional conduct policies. The letter stated, in part, that "We the undersigned know John Comaroff to be an excellent colleague, advisor, and committed university citizen.” Four days later, after three graduate students filed a lawsuit with detailed allegations of Comaroff's actions and the university's failure to respond, Beckert was one of several signatories to say that they wished to retract their signatures.

== Publications ==
=== Books ===
- Beckert, Sven (2025). Capitalism: A Global History. Penguin Press. ISBN 978-0-735-22083-6.
- Beckert, Sven (2014). Empire of Cotton: A Global History. Knopf Doubleday Publishing Group. ISBN 978-0-385-35325-0. online
- —— (2001). The Monied Metropolis: New York City and the Consolidation of the American Bourgeoisie, 1850–1896. Cambridge University Press. ISBN 978-0-521-52410-0. online
- ---- "History of American capitalism" (American Historical Association, 2012). 44pp historiography; on;line

=== Journal articles ===
- —— (2005). "From Tuskegee to Togo: The Problem of Freedom in the Empire of Cotton". Journal of American History. 92 (2): 498–526. doi:10.2307/3659276. JSTOR 3659276.
- —— (2004). "Emancipation and Empire: Reconstructing the Worldwide Web of Cotton Production in the Age of the American Civil War" (PDF). American Historical Review. 109 (5): 1405–1438. doi:10.1086/530931. S2CID 161634950.
- —— (2002). "Democracy and its Discontents: Contesting Suffrage Rights in Gilded Age New York". Past and Present. 174 (1): 114–155. doi:10.1093/past/174.1.116.

=== Edited volumes ===
- Sven Beckert, and Seth Rockman, eds. (2006) Slavery's Capitalism - A New History Of American Economic Development (2006) online
- Rosenbaum, Julia B.; Beckert, Sven, eds. (2011). The American Bourgeoisie: Distinction and Identity in the Nineteenth Century. Palgrave Macmillan. ISBN 978-0-230-31454-2.
- Beckert, Sven; Desan, Christine, eds. (2018). American Capitalism: New Histories. New York City: Columbia University Press. ISBN 9780231185240. OCLC 987660154.
