= Eleanor Sharpston =

British lawyer

Dame Eleanor Sharpston DCMG KC

Advocate General at the European Court of Justice
- In office 11 January 2006 – 10 September 2020
- Preceded by: Sir Francis Jacobs
- Succeeded by: Athanasios Rantos

Personal details
- Born: Eleanor Veronica Elizabeth Sharpston; 13 July 1955 (age 71)
- Spouse: David Lyon (1991–2000)
- Education: King's College, Cambridge

Dame Eleanor Veronica Elizabeth Sharpston, known informally as "Leo Sharpston" (born 13 July 1955), is a British and Luxembourgish barrister who served as an Advocate General at the Court of Justice of the European Union (CJEU) from 2006 to 2020.

== Life ==
Sharpston studied economics, languages and law at King's College, Cambridge (1973–77), followed by university teaching and research at Corpus Christi College, Oxford (1977–80). She was called to the Bar by the Middle Temple in 1980 and was a barrister in private practice from 1980 to 1987 and from 1990-2005; King's Counsel (1999); and Bencher of Middle Temple (2005). In the intervening years (1987–90) she worked as legal secretary (referendaire) in the Chambers of Advocate General, subsequently Judge, Sir Gordon Slynn later Lord Slynn of Hadley. She was also a lecturer in EC and comparative law and Director of European Legal Studies at University College London (1990–92), and then a lecturer (1992–98), and subsequently affiliated lecturer (1998–2005), in the Faculty of Law at the University of Cambridge. She was a senior research fellow at the Centre for European Legal Studies of the University of Cambridge (1998–2005) and remains a fellow of King's College, Cambridge (since 1992).

Sharpston is also a member of the Irish Bar and an Honorary Bencher of King's Inns, Dublin. She has published books and articles on EU law. Having spent her childhood in Brazil and then her adolescence and half her practising life in continental Europe, she speaks a number of European languages. She holds dual nationality: British and Luxembourgish.

She served as joint head of Hailsham Chambers in London, with her colleague Michael Pooles QC, from 2003 to 2006. Amongst her many high-profile cases at the Bar she was perhaps best known for acting (together with her colleague Philip Moser) for the prosecution in the case of the Metric Martyrs, Thoburn v Sunderland City Council, and for the appellants in the House of Lords case R v Brown, often referred to by its police name of 'Operation Spanner'.

In 1991, she married David Lyon, a maritime historian and also a King's College alumnus whom she met through their mutual nautical interests; he died in 2000.

Nominated by the UK to serve as an Advocate General from 10 January 2006, this was renewed in 2009 and again in 2015. On 7 October 2008, she was appointed First Advocate General of the CJEU for one year. In 2010, she was awarded an honorary doctorate by the University of Glasgow. On 21 July 2011, she was awarded an honorary degree of Doctor of Laws from Nottingham Trent University. She holds further honorary doctorates from the University of Edinburgh and from Stockholm University. In 2025 she was elected an honorary fellow of St Edmund's College, Cambridge.

She delivered three Hamlyn Lectures in 2020 entitled The Great Experiment: Constructing a European Union under the Rule of Law from a Group of Diverse Sovereign States.

In 2020, she brought judicial review proceedings against the EU over her removal from the CJEU following Brexit. On 6 October 2020 the General Court dismissed her action. On 16 June 2021 the Court of Justice of the European Union dismissed her appeal against that decision on the basis that her removal by a decision of the 27 remaining Member States was not subject to judicial review by the EU Courts. The judgment received mixed reactions from scholars. Some disagreed with the Court's opinion, deeming it a threat to judicial independence and the rule of law in the EU, and pointing out "inconsistencies" in the Court's ruling and criticizing its refusal to review "acts of the Member States". Others endorsed the outcome, although critically referring to how the Court approached its margins of judicial review.

== Honours ==
In December 2024, she was appointed Dame Commander of the Order of St Michael and St George (DCMG).

== See also ==
- List of members of the European Court of Justice
