= Yorke Prize =

The Yorke Prize is awarded annually by the Faculty of Law at the University of Cambridge for an essay of between 30,000 and 100,000 words on a legal subject, including the history, analysis, administration and reform of law, "of exceptional quality, which makes a substantial contribution to its relevant field of legal knowledge."

The prize, awarded from the Yorke Fund, is open to any graduate of, or any person who is or has been registered as a graduate student of, the university.

== Endowment ==
The Yorke Fund was endowed in 1873 by the will of Edmund Yorke (b. 8 February 1787, d.29 November 1871), alumnus of Rugby School, scholar and later Fellow of St Catharine's College, Cambridge and barrister of Lincoln's Inn, London.

== Yorke Prize winners ==
Winners of the Yorke Prize include:

- Courtney Stanhope Kenny, 1877, 1878, 1879
- Perceval Maitland Laurence, 1878
- Thomas Edward Scrutton 1882, 1884, 1885, 1886
- Richard Cockburn Maclaurin, 1898
- Richard Turner, 1923
- C. J. Hamson, 1932
- J. W. Brunyate, 1929
- Norman Bentwich
- S. F. C. Milsom, 1948
- Robin Cooke, Baron Cooke of Thorndon, 1955
- Norman St John-Stevas, Baron St John of Fawsley, 1957
- Brian Coote
- John Guy
- John H. Langbein
- Sir John Baker, 1975
- Antônio Augusto Cançado Trindade, 1977
- Francis Gurry, 1980
- Paul McHugh, 1988
- Neil Jones
- Mark Elliott
- Ralph Wilde
- Andrew Lang
- Kate Purcell
- Jason Varuhas
- Alex Mills, 2007
- Kimberly Trapp, 2008
- Marko Milanovic
- Sarah Nouwen
- Philip Murray
- Brian Sloan, 2014
- Tobias Schaffner, 2015
- Federica Paddeu, 2015
- Brendan Plant, 2015
- Naomi Hart
- Fernando Lusa Bordin
- Joe Sampson, 2017
- Visa A.J. Kurki, 2018
- Christopher Jenkins, 2018
- Zoe Adams, 2019
- Liron Shmilovits, 2019
- Raffael N. Fasel, 2020
- Will Bateman, 2020
- Michael Foran, 2021
- Stevie Martin, 2021
- Orfeas Chasapis Tassinis, 2021
- Alex Waghorn, 2022
- Maayan Menashe, 2022
- Francesca Farrington, 2023
- Narine Lalafaryan, 2023
- Giordana Campagna, 2024
- Fotis Vergis, 2024
- Maxence Rivoire, 2025
- Guy Baldwin, 2025
- Pedro Schilling de Carvalho, 2025
- Jeanne-Rose Arn, 2026
- Bhumika Billa, 2026
- Holli Sargeant, 2026
