= Michael Lobban =

South African legal historian

Michael John Warrender Lobban, FBA (born 22 October 1962) is a legal historian. He has been a Senior Research Fellow at All Souls College, Oxford since 2022, before which he was Professor of Legal History at the London School of Economics from 2013.

== Career ==
Michael Lobban was born in Cape Town, South Africa, on 22 October 1962. He was educated at Corpus Christi College, Cambridge, graduating with a Bachelor of Arts degree in 1984, and then studying for a doctorate there. His PhD was awarded in 1988 for his thesis "The development of common law theory: English jurisprudence c. 1760 – c. 1830". After holding a junior lectureship at the University of the Witwatersrand in 1988, he was elected to a junior research fellowship at St John's College, Oxford, in 1988. In 1991, he was appointed to a lectureship at Durham University, and promoted to a readership there four years later. In 1997, he joined Brunel University London as a reader, and in 2000 took up a readership at Queen Mary University of London, where he was appointed Professor of Legal History in 2003. In 2013, he moved to the London School of Economics to be Professor of Legal History. In 2022, he returned to Oxford as a Senior Research Fellow at All Souls College.

According to his British Academy profile, Lobban specialises in the "history of eighteenth and nineteenth century English law and lawyers, with a special focus on the relationship between doctrine, institutions and legal and political thought".

He serves as Secretary of the Selden Society.

== Honours and awards ==
In 2015, Lobban was elected a Fellow of the British Academy, the United Kingdom's national academy for the humanities and social sciences.

== Selected publications ==
- The Common Law and English Jurisprudence, 1760–1850 (Clarendon Press, 1991).
- White Man's Justice: South African Political Trials in the Black Consciousness Era (Oxford University Press, 1996).
- A History of the Philosophy of Law in the Common Law World, 1600–1900 (Springer, 2007).
- (Co-authored with William Cornish, J. Stuart Anderson, Ray Cocks, Patrick Polden, and Keith Smith) The Oxford History of the Laws of England, vols. 11–13 (2010).
- Law in Theory and History: New Essays on a Neglected Dialogue, eds. Maksymilian Del Mar and Michael Lobban (Hart Publishing, 2016).
- Law, Lawyers and Litigants in Early Modern England" Essays in Memory of Christopher W. Brooks, eds. Adrian Green, Joanne Begiato, and Michael Lobban (Cambridge University Press, 2019)
- Networks and Connections in Legal History, eds. Michael Lobban and Ian Williams (Cambridge University Press, 2020).
