= John H. Langbein =

American legal scholar (born 1941)

- Born: November 17, 1941 (age 84); Washington, D.C., U.S.
- Education: Columbia University (BA); Harvard University (LLB); Trinity Hall, Cambridge (LLB, PhD)

John Harriss Langbein (born 1941) is an American legal scholar who serves as the Sterling Professor emeritus of Law and Legal History at Yale University. He is an expert in the fields of trusts and estates, comparative law, and Anglo-American legal history.

== Early life and education ==
Langbein was born in 1941 in Washington, D.C. He studied economics at Columbia University, graduating with a Bachelor of Arts in 1964. He then attended the Harvard Law School, graduating in 1968 with a LL.B. magna cum laude. He then studied law at Trinity Hall, Cambridge, receiving a second LLB in 1969 (a graduate law degree at the time, which Cambridge renamed the LLM in 1982) and a Ph.D. in 1971. His Cambridge Ph.D. thesis, "The Criminal Process in the Renaissance," was awarded the Yorke Prize. He also received an honorary M.A. degree in 1990 from Yale University.

== Career ==
In 1971, Langbein joined the University of Chicago Law School as an assistant professor of law, eventually holding the position of Max Pam Professor of American and Foreign Law. In 1990, Langbein joined the faculty of the Yale Law School, where he eventually became a Sterling Professor, the highest-ranking appointment at Yale University. He retired in 2015.

In the field of trusts and estates, Langbein is known for his scholarship advocating greater flexibility in the application of the Wills Act formalities, work which led to the adoption of the "harmless error" standard in the Uniform Probate Code. He has also called attention to the trend whereby human capital has replaced physical capital as the dominant form of wealth transmitted from parent to child. In the fields of comparative law and legal history, he is best known for his critique of the common-law jury and adversarial procedure, which he considers inferior to the Continental alternatives, especially the German system.

Langbein is the author of numerous books and articles. He has focused in particular on the history of criminal procedure, comparing the Anglo-American tradition to that of the European Continent. His article, "The Prosecutorial Origins of Defence Counsel in the Eighteenth Century: The Appearance of Solicitors," was awarded the Sutherland Prize by the American Society for Legal History in 2000. He is also a coauthor of the leading casebook on American pension law, Pension & Employee Benefit Law (4th ed. 2006).

Langbein has long been active in law reform. He has served as an Associate Reporter for the Restatement of Property (Third): Wills and Other Donative Transfers, and is an adviser to the Restatement (Third) of Trusts. He is also a Commissioner of the National Conference of Commissioners on Uniform State Laws, and has served on the drafting committees for several uniform acts, including the Uniform Prudent Investor Act (1994), for which he was the Reporter.

== Publications ==
Articles

- JH Langbein and RA Posner, ‘Market Funds and Trust-Investment Law’ [1976] American Bar Foundation Research Journal 1, 6
- Langbein, John (1978). "Torture and Plea Bargaining" (PDF). The University of Chicago Law Review. 46 (1): 3–22. doi:10.2307/1599287. JSTOR 1599287.
- JH Langbein and RA Posner, ‘Social Investing and the Law of Trusts’ (1980-1981) 79 Michigan Law Review 72, 88
- JH Langbein, ‘The Uniform Prudent Investor Act and the Future of Trust Investing’ [1996] 81 Iowa Law Review 641
- JH Langbein ‘Questioning the Trust Law Duty of Loyalty’ (2005) 114 Yale Law Journal 929 - 990.
