= Michael Freeman (academic) =

Michael Freeman FBA
- Born: Michael David Alan Freeman; 25 November 1943
- Died: 3 July 2024 (aged 80)
- Occupation: Legal academic
- Years active: 1966–2024
- Known for: Scholarship on children's rights; founding editor of The International Journal of Children's Rights
- Title: Professor of English Law
- Spouse: Vivien Freeman
- Awards: FBA (2009); Hamlyn Lecturer (2015)

Academic background
- Education: University College London (LLB, LLM)

Academic work
- Discipline: Law
- Sub-discipline: Family law; children's rights; jurisprudence; medical ethics and law
- Institutions: University of Leeds (1966–1969); University College London (1969–2024)
- Notable works: The Rights and Wrongs of Children (1983); Article 3: The Best Interests of the Child (2007); A Magna Carta for Children? Rethinking Children's Rights (2020)
- Notable ideas: "Liberal paternalism" theory of children's rights

Michael Freeman FBA (25 November 1943 – 3 July 2024) was an English law academic. He was Professor of English Law at the Faculty of Laws, University College London from 1984 to 2011, and Emeritus Professor thereafter.

== Early life and education ==
Freeman studied at the Hasmonean Grammar School in Hendon before studying for an LLB (1965) and LLM (1966) at University College London. He was called to the bar of England and Wales in 1968 at Gray's Inn.

== Academic career ==
Freeman was a lecturer at University of Leeds from 1966 to 1969. He then returned to UCL, where he remained for the rest of his career, as a lecturer until 1979 and as a reader until 1984, when he was appointed Professor of English Law.

Freeman was an influential scholar in the area of children's rights. His theory of children's rights, first proposed in his 1983 work The Rights and Wrongs of Children, is a realist approach, considering children's social context, the way they are affected and affect others through their relationships, and their shifting and continuing development and maturation. He notably, in a 1987 paper, chastised Ronald Dworkin for overlooking children in the theories the legal philosopher presented in Taking Rights Seriously.

Freeman's body of work before and after the UN Convention on the Rights of the Child, leading up to his 2007 commentary on Article 3, has been associated with the pivot in UK law towards giving children's best interests primacy of consideration in the Supreme Court case ZH (Tanzania), with Freeman's work referenced by Baroness Hale, who wrote the leading judgment, in her public remarks on children's rights.

Freeman was also a noted feminist thinker, and is credited as having brought the women's liberation movement into the 1970s legal academy, which had been heavily resistant to linking the causes of domestic violence to the subordination of women.

Freeman was a prolific contributor to academic literature. He founded the International Journal of Children's Rights, and by the time of his retirement, had published over 85 books and a large number of academic articles. He convened the Current Legal Problems lecture series and yearbook for much of his career, and held 15 iterations of the Current Legal Issues symposia at UCL Laws.

In 2009, Freeman was elected to the British Academy. In 2015, he gave the Hamlyn Lectures, entitled A Magna Carta for Children? – Rethinking Children's Rights.

== Personal life ==
Freeman married his partner, Vivien, in 1967. He notably enjoyed classical music, cricket and mischief, notoriously delivering his UCL lectures dressed as Margaret Thatcher on the day of her resignation.
