= Paul McHugh (legal scholar) =

New Zealand academic lawyer (born 1958)

- Born: 1958 (age 67–68); Gisborne, New Zealand
- Education: Victoria University of Wellington
- Alma mater: Saskatchewan
- Known for: Academic lawyer
- Partner: Andrew Hardwick (Producer)
- Children: 1
- Awards: Yorke Prize
- Scientific career
- Institutions: University of Cambridge
- Thesis: The aboriginal rights of the New Zealand Maori at common law (1988)

Paul Gerrard McHugh (born 1958) is a New Zealand academic lawyer. He teaches at the University of Cambridge where he is a Professor in Law and Legal History and Fellow of Sidney Sussex College.

== Education ==
McHugh was born Gisborne, New Zealand. He graduated LL.B.(Hons I) from Victoria University of Wellington, LLM (Saskatchewan), and obtained his PhD at Cambridge with his dissertation "The aboriginal rights of the New Zealand Maori at common law" (which was awarded a Yorke Prize in 1988). It will be republished by Institute of Post-Treaty Settlements Office as a classic influential text.

== Career ==
McHugh's work has primarily been in the field of common-law aboriginal rights, a topic on which he has published extensively. He is recognised as an authority on the legal status of tribal peoples in North America and Australasia; as both a doctrinal scholar and as a legal historian, as well as writer on the 'politics of historiography.'

His work on the doctrine of aboriginal title in New Zealand argued that there remained unextinguished Māori rights around the coastline. The High Court accepted and cited his work in the Te Weehi case (1986), leading to a series of cases in which New Zealand courts applied Māori customary law, recognising it as the basis for Māori rights and exemption from the regulatory regime of the Fisheries Act 1988. His early academic reputation rests upon his pioneering work on the status of the common law doctrine of aboriginal title, a field to which he returned after the Ngati Apa case (2003) reactivated this debate in New Zealand. The Court's judgments led to the foreshore and seabed controversy (2003-4) which fundamentally changed the course of New Zealand politics and ruptured the Maori Rātana movement's longstanding alliance with the Labour Party. McHugh is recognised as a leading authority on common law aboriginal title and the legal character of tribal peoples' property rights throughout the common law world. It is believed the New Zealand Government's willingness to settle the Maori commercial sea fisheries claim (1992) was directly attributable to McHugh's work and, associated with it, high-placed anxiety about an 'activist' New Zealand Court of Appeal. The President Robin Cooke, Baron Cooke of Thorndon, as he became (1995) was known to hold a personal copy of McHugh's dissertation and in conversation with him as well as having shown judicial mettle in the Maori Council cases of the time. Though based upon the claim to present unextinguished rights (rather than those lost by colourable Crown conduct in the past) this was the country's first multimillion-dollar settlement of Maori claims in the modern era, and a foretaste of the claims settlement processes and asset transfers that followed and as contemplated by the Maori Council cases. McHugh is associated with the view that common law aboriginal title was primarily a legal argument devised (in western Canada initially) during the early 1970s and following decade to deal with the inaction of the political branches (their incapacity to legislate comprehensive land rights/claims regimes). McHugh was amongst a small group of lawyer/scholars during the 1980s (Brian Slattery, Kent McNeil, Henry Reynolds, Barbara Hocking, Richard Bartlett, Tom Berger) to package aboriginal title in a manner that became palatable to courts. He has been especially associated with its New Zealand dimension, as Justice Willamson acknowledged in Te Weehi and as his influence both upon the activation and course of the foreshore and seabed controversy showed. He made considerable public lectures and practitioners workshops in New Zealand during this period, and his work was regarded as influential at the highest political levels (including a half-day presentation to the Parliamentary Select Committee and Waitangi Tribunal). As the controversy waged (particularly during the lifetime of the Clark premiership and the Fifth Labour Government of New Zealand redrawing the country's political map), his published work returned to the more doctrinal orientation it had taken during his early career before his so-called 'Pocockian turn' described in Mark Hickford's important book Lords of the Land: Indigenous Property Rights and the Jurisprudence of Empire (Oxford University Press, Oxford, 2011) at 221-3 and Bernard Cadogan 'Treaty and Method' (online at this link).

McHugh published The Māori Magna Carta (1991), which for the first time explained and analysed the range of laws specifically affecting the Māori in light of the Treaty of Waitangi.

In the 1990s his work began incorporating a comparativist dimension, culminating in the publication in 2004 of Aboriginal societies and the common law: a history of sovereignty, status and self-determination. The book picks up themes of his work in the previous decade, particularly the intellectual influence of John Pocock (Johns Hopkins University) and R. A. Sharp (Auckland, writer of Justice and the Maori (1990 and 1997)). In particular McHugh argues for the historicisation not just of legal doctrine, but of the notion of law itself, so that the history of the common law's encounter with tribal societies becomes also an expression of the change in the nature and modalities of legal thought. Further, the first half of the book considers the notion of sovereignty and how it developed in the Crown's dealings with non-Christian and tribal peoples from the medieval period. The second half of the book considers the modern history of aboriginal rights, once they had been admitted into what he calls the 'common-law rights-place' as a result of key court judgments. All common-law jurisdictions (Canada in 1973; the United States in 1978; New Zealand in 1986–91; and Australia in 1992 and 1996) experienced the impact of major court judgments dramatically reconfiguring state relations with the tribes. Thrust into the rights-place aboriginal peoples have had to develop the legalism of life inside that habitat. This has presented issues of what McHugh terms 'rights-management' (governance) and '-integration' (ongoing harmonisation/integration of aboriginal rights with other rights such as those of municipalities, gender, resource licensees, environment etc.).

In a series of papers from 1995, McHugh began considering the historiographical properties of legal thought and method and legal process, with Andrew Sharp initiating a debate in New Zealand and Australia that has been continued by other academics and writers such as John Pocock (reproduced in his collection of essays "The discovery of islands" in 2005), W. H. Oliver, Bain Attwood and Giselle Byrnes. The essay collection "Histories Power and Loss" brings this work together, anchored by Pocock's essay. A more explicitly 'historical' method appears in his published work from this time with its insistence upon the careful historicisation - the placing in time and place - not only of legal doctrine but also of the notions of legal obligation and the exercise of public authority at play in that setting. Hickford (2011) and Cadogan (2011) are clear that McHugh's position towards the history of common law 'aboriginal rights' is comfortably inside the mainstream of disciplinary practice in the writing of the history of political thought as are important scholars in Australia such as Bain Attwood and Ian Hunter. Whilst uncontroversial and accepted intellectual fare in Australasia, McHugh's critique of whiggish historical method in the conduct of contemporary aboriginal claims-making in the courts and the shaping of historical narrative according to the predicates of present-day legal doctrine has become more controversial in Canada [see 'Indigenous Rights Litigation, Legal History, and the Role of Experts' (Kent McNeil) 2014 Saskatchewan Law Review alongside McHugh's essay]. As a result of recent judicial interpretation of section 35 of the Canada Act (the 'aboriginal rights' provision) First Nations are bringing historical claims before Canadian courts. In New Zealand this type of aboriginal claim is subject to political resolution with limited court intervention whilst in Australia the federal Government does not admit such claims with the Native Title Act 1993 processes being limited to accommodation of existing property and related claims.

McHugh has also considered the constitutional basis of Crown relations with Māori outside of a claims-centred mode of engagement, a commissioned paper for the NZ Department of Justice published with another, on a similar theme by Ken Coates as "Aboriginal Identity and Relations in North America and Australasia". This paper, with its argument for the recognition of Crown and tribe in ongoing relations from which exit is not possible and finality and closure illusory, influenced the move towards more 'relational' approaches in the public sphere where Māori issues were to be seen in terms of living relationships rather than a sequence of problems to be eliminated. The language of closure and exit that dominated Pākehā (European) discourse of Māori claims was predicated upon an outcome – Māori mergence into a culturally undifferentiated populace – that would never happen and which, in any event, was contrary to the Treaty itself (and, he might have added, the plain demographic pattern which strengthens rather than diminishes Polynesian profile).

He has also written of the nature of constitutional memory and its manifestation in the New Zealand setting, as well as argued for a more sophisticated historiography of New Zealand legal history, a 'tradition' that he believes has yet to take root.

In 2004–06 he returned to common law aboriginal title in the wake of the New Zealand foreshore and seabed controversy when the Court applied common law principles following the arguments pioneered in his published work in the 1980s He appeared as an independent witness before the Waitangi Tribunal (2004) and the Select Committee hearings (2005) and toured the country (under the aegis of the New Zealand Law Society) explaining the legal position. In 2010 he appeared as expert witness before the Waitangi Tribunal on the Te Tii Marae, Kerikeri, explaining the legal basis of the British annexation of New Zealand.

He has also been retained by the Canadian Department of Justice as an independent witness in several major land claims.

His book Aboriginal Title was published in 2011 (Oxford University Press). The book is an intellectual history of the rise, spread and impact of the common law doctrine into the modern era of rights and their enforcement by courts. McHugh looks at the gestation, early formation and conceptualisation of the doctrine in western Canada through its articulation by scholars, adoption by courts there, in New Zealand and Australia (as native title), its subsequent elaboration in Canadian and Australian case law – the busiest jurisdictions – through a proprietary paradigm located primarily (and more and more constrictively) inside adjudicative processes. From the millennium, forms of the doctrine also came to be applied by courts in Belize, Malaysia and southern Africa. The doctrine also influenced the rapid development during the 1990s and after of the norms of indigenous peoples rights at international law. He looks at how the courts' acceptance of the doctrine absorbed elements of surrounding public law values including norms of non-discrimination (absorbed from the international law covenants and cvil rights movements), judicial wariness of unabridged executive discretion (the platform for the rise of common law judicial review from the 1970s), the rise of public interest litigation and revised attitudes and practices towards amenability of the Crown to court proceedings. He also considers the issues of inter-disciplinary thought and practice arising from national legal systems' recognition of aboriginal land rights, including the emergent and associated themes of self-determination that surfaced more overtly during the 1990s and after.

He has published also on constitutional identity in Anglo settler societies in the late-nineteenth and early-twentieth century. He is working on a new book (2016) 'Unremitting Solicitude': Crown, Tribes and Law in the Victorian Era. This develops the underlying theme of his 2004 book calling for the careful historicisation not only of legal doctrine but also and more fundamentally of the notion of law and the exercise of public authority. He is in considerable demand internationally to give public lectures and workshops on the rights of aboriginal peoples in both an historical and present-day setting, in Canada and New Zealand especially, and is regarded as one of the most influential scholars in the field.

== Family ==
His mother was Pauline Mary McHugh (died 1991). His father was Ashley George McHugh (died 1999), who became Deputy Chief Judge of the Māori Land Court and later chaired the Waitangi Tribunal's hearing of the Ngāi Tahu Claim (see Treaty of Waitangi claims and settlements). As of 2006, his civil partner is Andrew Hardwick, a film producer. His son Frankie was born November 2010.
