= Harry S. Martin =

American academic (born 1943)

- Born: Harry S. Martin III; 1943 (age 82–83)
- Occupation: Academic
- Children: 2

Academic background
- Education: Harvard University; University of Pittsburgh; University of Minnesota Law School

Harry S. Martin III (born 1943) is an American academic. Educated at Harvard University, the University of Pittsburgh, and the University of Minnesota Law School, Martin served as Ess Librarian and professor of law at Harvard. A specialist on Art law, Artificial intelligence and law, Information policy, Legal research, and Library Administration, he received the American Association of Law Libraries lifetime achievement award in 2012. As head law librarian at Harvard from 1981 to 2008, Martin helped move the Harvard Law Library into the internet age. He also directed the Georgetown University law library from 1976 to 1981, and served on the Board of the AALL. Martin is currently adjunct professor of law at the University of Texas-Austin. He has been active in the American Bar Association, and he released important materials on the Nuremberg trials while at Harvard.

== Personal life ==
Martin is married with two children.
