= John Baker (legal historian) =

English legal historian

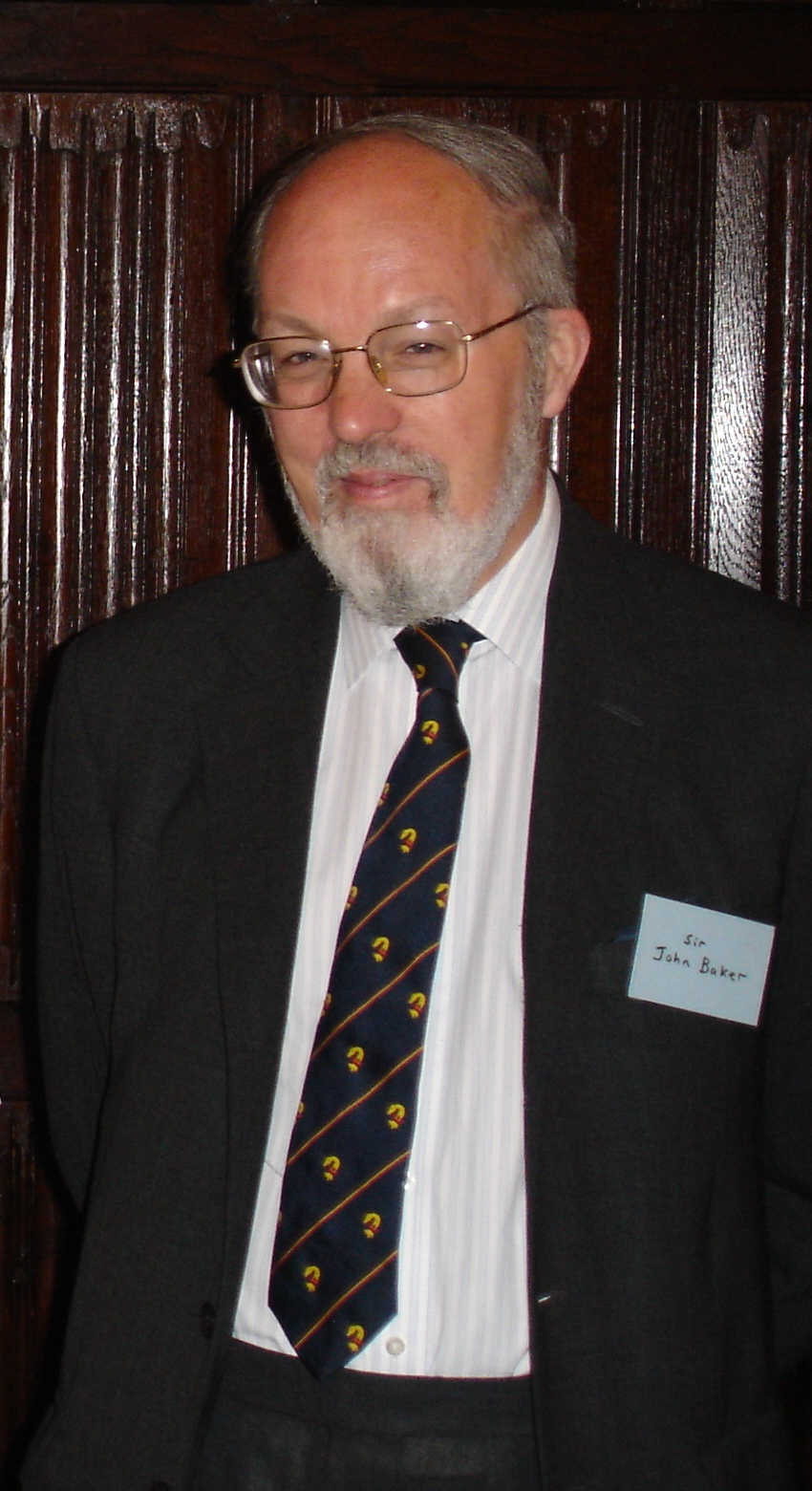
Sir John Baker

Sir John Hamilton Baker (born 10 April 1944) is an English legal historian. He was Downing Professor of the Laws of England at the University of Cambridge from 1998 to 2011.

== Biography ==
Baker was born in Sheffield, the son of Kenneth Lee Vincent and Marjorie Baker (née Bagshaw). He was educated at King Edward VI Grammar School, Chelmsford, and University College London (LLB, PhD). He was called to the Bar at the Inner Temple in 1966 and was elected an Honorary Bencher in 1988.

His first academic post was as an assistant lecturer in law at University College London, in 1965. In 1967 he was promoted to Lecturer, and in 1971 moved to the University of Cambridge. There he was Librarian of the Squire Law Library until 1973, and became a Fellow of St Catharine's College. His rooms were above the Sherlock Library until his retirement.

In 1973 Baker became a lecturer in law at University of Cambridge. He was appointed Reader in English Legal History at the University of Cambridge in 1983. In 1988 he was appointed Professor of English Legal History. From 1998 until 2011 he was Downing Professor of the Laws of England.

He was President of St Catharine's College, Cambridge until 2007 when he was succeeded by Professor Sir Christopher Alan Bayly. He was also Literary Director of the Selden Society until 2011 (jointly with David Yale 1981–91, sole 1991–2011) when he was succeeded by Dr Neil Jones.

Appointments have included visiting professor, New York University School of Law since 1988, Visiting Fellow, All Souls College, Oxford in 1995, Honorary Fellow, Society for Advanced Legal Studies 1998, Corresponding Fellow American Society for Legal History 1992, and Foreign Honorary Member, American Academy of Arts and Sciences 2001. He was elected a Fellow of the British Academy (1984) and a Fellow of the Royal Historical Society (1980).

Baker was appointed a Fellow of University College London in 1991, awarded an Honorary LLD of the University of Chicago in 1991, and received the Yorke Prize (University of Cambridge) 1975, and the Ames Prize (Harvard Law School) in 1985. He was knighted in 2003, the only man ever knighted for services to legal history. In 2004, he was awarded the Irish Legal History Society's gold medal.

His first marriage in 1968 was to Veronica Margaret Lloyd, with whom he had two daughters. They were divorced in 1997, and in 2002 he married Fiona Rosalind Holdsworth (née Cantlay), who died in 2005. He remarried in 2010 to Elisabeth van Houts.

== Selected Publications ==
- An Introduction to English Legal History. London: Butterworths. 1979.(1st ed. 1971, 2nd ed. 1979, 3rd ed. 1990, 4th ed. 2002, and 5th ed. 2019).
- The Reports of Sir John Spelman [editor] (1977).
- Manual of Law French (1979).
- The Order of Serjeants at Law (1984).
- English Legal MSS in the USA (Part I) (1985).
- The Legal Profession and the Common Law: Historical Essays. London: Hambledon Press. 1986. ISBN 9780907628620.
- Sources of English Legal History (coeditor, with S. F. C. Milsom) (1st ed. 1986, 2nd ed. 2010).
- The Notebook of Sir John Port [editor] (1987).
- Readings and Moots at the Inns of Court (1990).
- English Legal MSS in the USA (Part II) (1990).
- Cases from the Lost Notebooks of Sir James Dyer [editor] (1994).
- Catalogue of English Legal MSS in Cambridge University Library (1996).
- Spelman’s Reading on Quo Warranto [editor] (1997).
- Monuments of Endlesse Labours: English Canonists and Their Work, 1300-1900 (1998).
- Caryll's Reports [editor] (1999).
- The Common Law Tradition: Lawyers, Books, and the Law Tradition (2000).
- The Law's Two Bodies: Some Evidential Problems in English Legal History (2001).
- Readings and Moots at the Inns of Court in the Fifteenth Century (2000).
- Oxford History of the Laws of England, Volume VI: 1483-1558 (2003).
- Reports from the Time of Henry VIII [editor] (2003–04).
- An Inner Temple Miscellany: papers reprinted from the Inner Temple yearbook (2004).
- The Reports of William Dalison, 1552-1558 [editor] (2007).
- English Legal Manuscripts Formerly in the Collection of Sir Thomas Phillipps [coeditor] (2008).
- The Men of Court 1440 to 1550: A Prosopography of the Inns of Court and Chancery and the Courts of Law (2012).
- The Inns of Chancery 1340-1640: with an Edition of the Surviving Statutes and Orders (2017).
- English Law Under Two Elizabeths: The Late Tudor Legal World and the Present (The Hamlyn Lectures) (2021).
