= Christine A. Desan =

American academic

- Education: Princeton University (AB); Yale University (JD); Fletcher School of Law and Diplomacy (MA)
- Occupation: Legal scholar
- Employer: Harvard Law School

Christine A. Desan is an American academic. She is the Leo Gottlieb Professor of Law at the Harvard Law School and, with Sven Beckert, co-director of the Program on the Study of Capitalism at Harvard University.

Christine Desan founded and is the managing director of a website, JustMoney.Org, that analyzes money as a legal institution. She serves on the advisory boards for Capitalism and History and The Journal of Law and Political Economy. In 2019, Desan delivered the Adam Smith Lecture on Jurisprudence at the University of Glasgow.

== Education ==
After graduating from Princeton University in 1981 with a bachelor's degree in religion, Desan earned a Juris Doctor degree from Yale Law School and a Master of Arts in law and diplomacy from the Fletcher School of Law and Diplomacy in 1987. After graduation, she worked in the U.S. Office of the Solicitor General.

She clerked for Supreme Court Justice Stephen Breyer.

== Field of interest ==
Desan's work focuses on monetary history and theory. She argued in her 2014 book, Making Money: Coin, Currency, and the Coming of Capitalism (Oxford 2014), that a profound change in money's design occurred when the British government began to share money-making authority with investors incorporated as a national bank (Bank of England). That monetary transformation would soon expand to include a powerful financial architecture. Over the decades of the 18th century, the British developed circulating public debt, capital markets, and commercial banking. Those institutions worked synergistically with the Bank of England as it grew into a central bank. Desan identifies that quartet of institutions as central to and characteristic of the modern capitalism that went viral across the globe.

According to Desan, the revolution in monetary design included conceptual or ideological shifts that have come to be identified with classical and modern liberalism. A prime example of such change is the revision of older, culturally established attitudes towards and common/ecclesiastical law regulation of self-interest and usury as documented by English historian R.H. Tawney in "Religion and the rise of capitalism". In contrast to these medieval public policies, the British government institutionalized a new, implicit heuristic establishing private self-interest as a legitimate motive for consideration in the formation of public policy when it chartered the Bank of England. Where medieval morals had restrained private profit in the maintenance or lending of the common currency, the new heuristic established both practices as enlightened and patriotic without explicit provision for the external restraint of potential abuses. At the same time, the British government encouraged people to extend credit to it by issuing public bonds that returned interest to those holding them in apparent disregard of warnings about the abusive tendencies inherent in such practices issued by English economist and philosopher David Hume in "Political Discourses: Of Public Credit".

Desan is known for pioneering a "constitutional approach" to money and finance. According to that approach, money and finance are fields of public activity or forms of governance. Observing that modern moneys are anchored at the center by sovereign authority, Desan argues that they are basically public projects: creating a medium allows a government to measure resources and mobilize them. More particularly, Desan observes that political authorities have unique capacity to create a unit of account that will be widely accepted. As "stakeholder" within a community supported by member resources, a government can pay a member in a credit unit for advance contributions. That unit will hold value insofar as the government agrees to accept the credit unit back in lieu of future contributions. When a unit holds predictable value, demand among individuals to use it in private exchange also increases, accounting for the premium that money offers in cash services. The public definition of money makes it the original "safe asset."

According to Desan, government authority characterizes modern payments systems even if a government delegates enormous authority to private entities, like the commercial banks that today multiply the monetary base. Desan identifies private banking activity as a design choice within the financial architecture, analogous to minting on demand in commodity money worlds. A medium that measures value and provides a mode of payment is useful to private as well as public actors. By delegating money creation to commercial banks, a government can ensure elasticity in the money supply.

The constitutional approach contrasts with many conventions about money, which assume that it arose from barter or private exchange among individuals. Desan's recent work argues that such theories cannot explain how decentralized agents have a commensurable unit in which to work. More generally, Desan critiques neoclassical economics on the ground that it naturalizes existing arrangements and reifies "the market" as a sphere with a self-evident structure. Her work contends that design features associated with modern monetary systems are distributively non-neutral, contributing to escalating inequality.

Desan's earlier work focused on the monetary practice in early America. Before she began working on money, Desan analyzed legislative practices in early America. She coined the term "legislative adjudication" to refer to the authority that legislatures asserted to respond to claims for money from the public fisc. Those claims were generally made by petition given the sovereign immunity that protected legislatures from suit.

== Activism ==
While in Brookline, Massachusetts, Desan served for 10 years on a town committee that researched and drafted legislation promoting campaign finance reform and supervised that reform once it was enacted.

With Elizabeth Bartholet and James Cavallaro, Desan co-authored and organized an Open Letter to the U.S. Congress Concerning Human Rights Abuses at Abu Ghraib (presented June 16, 2004), signed by 509 law professors.

Desan co-signed the 2014 public statement by members of the faculty of Harvard Law School that objected to the "Sexual Harassment Policy and Procedures" imposed by the central university administration as insufficient to project the values associated with due process.

Desan was also a co-signatory to the open letter addressed, on 4 October 2018, to the U.S. Senate that argued against the confirmation of Brett Kavanaugh as a Justice to the U.S. Supreme Court.

In 2017, Desan authored a letter signed by 81 Harvard Law School colleagues condemning President Trump rhetoric that incited violence.

In 2020, Desan co-authored a second letter condemning President Trump for his pledge to use excessive force against Black Lives Matter protesters. The letter was signed by 165 Harvard Law School colleagues.

Desan supports an initiative to establish a public bank in Massachusetts and serves on the Steering Committee of the Massachusetts Public Banking Group.

== Works ==
- Desan, Christine, ed. (2019). A Cultural History of Money in the Age of Enlightenment. London: Bloomsbury. ISBN 9781474237390.
- Desan, Christine A. (2014). Making Money: Coin, Currency, and the Coming of Capitalism. Oxford, U.K.: Oxford University Press. ISBN 9780198709589. OCLC 914353437.
- Beckert, Sven; Desan, Christine, eds. (2018). American Capitalism: New Histories. New York City: Columbia University Press. ISBN 9780231185240. OCLC 987660154.
