= C. J. Hamson =

British jurist (1905–1987)

Charles John Joseph "Jack" Hamson, QC (23 November 1905 – 14 November 1987) was a British jurist.

== Early life and education ==
Hamson was born in Istanbul, Ottoman Empire as the son of Charles Edward Hamson, a vice-consul in the Levant Consular Service, and of Thérèse Boudon. He was educated at Downside School and at Trinity College, Cambridge, where he was a scholar, obtaining Firsts in both parts of the Classical Tripos in 1925 and 1927 respectively. He then turned to the study of law, obtaining taking the LL.B. in 1934 and the LL.M. in 1935. Between 1928 and 1929 he was Davidson Scholar at Harvard and in 1932 he won the Yorke Prize. A fencer, he was captain of the Cambridge épée team in 1928.

== Career ==
Hamson taught at University College, London, before returning to Cambridge in 1932 as assistant lecturer. In 1934 he was appointed university lecturer and elected a fellow of Trinity, where he would remain for the rest of his life. He was called to the bar by Gray's Inn in 1937.

At the outbreak of World War II, he sent his wife and daughter to the United States and was commissioned into the British Army in 1940. Seconded to the Special Operations Executive, he was clandestinely sent to Crete and was captured in 1941, spending the rest of the war as a prisoner of war. In captivity, Hamson taught law to his fellow prisoners, and wrote an account of his captivity which was published by Trinity College after his death in 1989.

After the War, Hamson returned to Cambridge, and was promoted to be Reader in Comparative Law in 1949. From 1953 to 1973 he was Professor of Comparative Law. He served as chairman of the Law Faculty from 1954 to 1957 and editor of the Cambridge Law Journal from 1955 to 1974. In 1954 he delivered the Hamlyn Lectures on the French Conseil d'Etat.

Hamson was Treasurer of Gray's Inn (an unusual honour for an academic) in 1975, having been elected a bencher in 1956. He was appointed Queen's Counsel in 1975. He was also a Chevalier of the Légion d'honneur.

== Personal life ==
In 1933 he married Isabella Drummond: they had one daughter. After the death of his wife in 1978, he returned to live in his college, where he died in 1987.
