= Neil Jones (academic) =

British academic

Neil Gareth Jones is a Professor of English Legal History at the University of Cambridge, the current director of studies in law of Magdalene College, and former literary director of The Selden Society. He supervises undergraduates in legal history and in land law.

Jones runs the legal history course at the university. He was also the academic secretary to the faculty of law from 2001 to 2003. Jones has also been the secretary of the Cambridge Law Journal and assistant literary director of the Selden Society, from which he won a prize for his seminal work The Use upon a Use in Equity Revisited.

He won the Chancellor's Medal in 1996 for the English law section of his LLM. He was also awarded a Yorke Prize for his doctoral thesis on the history of trusts between 1536 and 1660.

== Bibliography ==
- "Aspects of Privity in England: Equity to 1680", in E.J. Schrage, ed., Ius Quaesitum Tertio (Berlin, 2008)
- "The Trust Beneficiary's Interest before R. v. Holland (1648)", in Andrew Lewis, Paul Brand, and Paul Mitchell, eds., Law in the City: proceedings of the seventeenth British Legal History Conference (London, 2007)
- "The Bill of Middlesex and the Chancery, 1556–1608" (2001), 22 Journal of Legal History 3
- "Trusts in England after the Statute of Uses: a View from the Sixteenth Century", in R. H. Helmholz and R. Zimmermann, eds, Itinera Fiduciae (Berlin, 1998)
- "Long Leases and the Feudal Revenue in the Court of Wards, 1540–1645" (1998), 19 Journal of Legal History 1
- "Uses, Trusts, and a Path to Privity" [1997], Cambridge Law Journal 175
- "The Influence of Revenue Considerations upon the Remedial Practice of Chancery in Trust Cases, 1536–1660", in C. W. Brooks and M. Lobban, eds, Communities and Courts in Britain 1150–1900 (1997)
- "Trusts for Secrecy: the Case of John Dudley, Duke of Northumberland" [1995], Cambridge Law Journal 545
- "Tyrrel's Case (1557) and the Use upon a Use"' (1993), 14 Journal of Legal History 75
- "Estate Planning in Early-Modern England: 'Having' in the Statute of Wills 1540", in J. Tiley, ed., Studies in the History of Tax Law (2004)
- "The Use upon a Use in Equity Revisited" (2002), 33 Cambrian Law Review 67
