= Harry Street (jurist) =

British jurist and legal scholar (1919-1984)

Harry Street (1919-1984) was a well known British jurist and legal scholar. He spent much of his life at the University of Manchester. His work was wide-ranging but most notably included work on civil liberties and the law of torts. Street on Torts is, as of 2018, in its 15th edition.

== Selected publications ==
- Street, H. (1982). Freedom, the Individual, and the Law. Penguin Books.
- Street, H., Brazier, M., & Britain, G. (1955). The law of torts (pp. 170–72). Butterworth.
- Street, H. (1968). Justice in the Welfare State (Vol. 20). Sweet & Maxwell.
