= Charles Donahue (legal scholar) =

American legal scholar (born 1941)

- Born: October 4, 1941 (age 84); New York City, U.S.
- Education: Harvard University (BA); Yale University (LLB)
- Occupations: Law professor; legal historian
- Title: Paul A. Freund Professor of Law

Charles Donahue Jr. (born October 4, 1941) is an American legal scholar and historian who is the Paul A. Freund Professor of Law at Harvard Law School. He is an authority on Roman law, medieval law, property law, and English legal history and previously served as the president of the American Society for Legal History.

== Early life and career ==
Donahue was born on October 4, 1941, in New York City. From 1955 to 1959, he was educated at the Portsmouth Priory School in Portsmouth, Rhode Island, where he was valedictorian of his high school class. Donahue then attended Harvard College, where he completed a senior thesis titled "Romeo's Sweet New Style" and graduated magna cum laude in 1962 with a Bachelor of Arts in classics and English. In June 1962, he entered Yale Law School, enrolling in a special program in legal history under the supervision of Yale professors W. H. Dunham and Stephan Kuttner. Donahue became the articles editor and book review editor of The Yale Law Journal and earned his Bachelor of Laws (LL.B.) with membership in the Order of the Coif in 1965. He researched Pope Alexander III as a law student, which later formed the basis of his research into medieval marriage law.

After graduating from law school, Donahue was an attorney-advisor for the United States Air Force from 1965 to 1967, then was general counsel for the President's Commission on Postal Organization. From 1968 to 1979, he was a professor of law at the University of Michigan Law School, first as an assistant professor (1968–1971), then as an associate professor (1971–1973) and finally as a full professor (1973–1979). He joined the faculty of Harvard Law School as a professor in 1980 and received its appointment as the Paul A. Freund Professor of Law in June 1995.

== Awards and honors ==
Donahue is an elected life member of the American Law Institute. In 1981, he was awarded a Guggenheim Fellowship to pursue legal research. In 1986, he was elected a fellow of the Royal Historical Society in England. On March 24, 2012, he was elected a Fellow of the Medieval Academy of America in recognition to his contributions to medieval scholarship.

== Personal life ==
Donahue married Sheila Finn on August 22, 1964, and the couple had one daughter, Sarah (born 1965).

== Selected publications ==
- Donahue, Charles (2008). Law, Marriage, and Society in the Later Middle Ages: Arguments about Marriage in Five Courts. Cambridge University Press. doi:10.1017/CBO9780511511776. ISBN 9780511511776.
- Donahue, Charles (January 2010). "What Happened in the English Legal System in the Fourteenth Century and Why Would Anyone Want to Know". Southern Methodist University Law Review. 63 (3): 949–966.
- Donahue, Charles (June 1, 2016). "The Whole of the Constitutional History of England is a Commentary on This Charter". North Carolina Law Review. 94 (5): 1521–1544.
- Donahue, Charles (2019), "Another Way of Doing Manuscript Catalogues?", in Ibbetson, David; Jones, Neil; Ramsay, Nigel (eds.), English Legal History and its Sources: Essays in Honour of Sir John Baker, Cambridge: Cambridge University Press, pp. 282–299, ISBN 978-1-108-48306-3.
