= S. F. C. Milsom =

English legal historian (1923-2016)

Stroud Francis Charles Milsom QC, FBA, FRHistS (2 May 1923 – 24 February 2016) was an English legal historian, best known for his challenge to aspects of the works of F. W. Maitland. He was Professor of Law at the University of Cambridge from 1976 to 1990 and Fellow of St John's College, Cambridge from 1976 until his death. He was President of the Selden Society from 1985 to 1988.

== Biography ==
Milsom was born in Merton, Surrey, in 1923. He was educated at Charterhouse and Trinity College, Cambridge, where he read Law. Between 1944 and 1945 Milsom worked for Naval Intelligence. He was called to the bar by Lincoln's Inn in 1947, but never practiced. The same year, he received a Commonwealth Fund Fellowship to the University of Pennsylvania Law School. Milsom was a fellow of New College, Oxford, from 1956 to 1964, when he completed for publication Novae Narrationes, the Selden Society's volume for 1963, later cited in his book Historical Foundations of the Common Law.

Milsom was Professor of Legal History at the London School of Economics between 1964 and 1976, succeeding to Theodore Plucknett, and he succeeded Plucknett as Literary Director of the Selden Society, 1965-1980. The first edition of his seminal Historical Foundations of the Common Law was published in 1969. During those years, he also taught occasionally as a visiting professor at Yale Law School. Subsequently, Milsom was the society's President from 1985 to 1988, succeeding to Geoffrey Elton. From 1976 to 1990 he was Professor of Law at the University of Cambridge. In 1980, he delivered the Selden Society's lecture, on The Nature of Blackstone's Achievement, and the British Academy's Master-Mind Lecture, on F. W. Maitland. In 1984, he was elected to the American Philosophical Society. In 1986 he delivered the Ford Lectures (Oxford) on Law and Society in the 12th and 13th centuries.

Milson won the Ames Prize in 1972 and the Swiney Prize in 1974. He received honorary LLDs from Cambridge, Chicago, and Glasgow universities.
