= 2023 International Court of Justice judges election =

The 2023 International Court of Justice election was held on 9 November 2023 at the United Nations Headquarters in New York City. In the set of triennial elections, the General Assembly and the Security Council concurrently elect five judges to the Court for nine-year terms. From the nine candidates, the five winners were Juan Manuel Gómez Robledo Verduzco (Mexico), Sarah Cleveland (United States), Bogdan Aurescu (Romania), Hilary Charlesworth (Australia) and Dire Tladi (South Africa).

== Background ==
The International Court of Justice (ICJ), based in The Hague, is one of the principal organs of the United Nations. The court consists of 15 judges, with five judges elected every three years. In the case of death or other vacancy, a judge is elected for the remainder of the term. Judges are required to be independent and impartial; they may not exercise any political or administrative function, and do not act as a representative of their home state. Elections of members of the Court are governed by articles 2 through 15 of the Statute of the International Court of Justice.

In February 2024, the terms of five judges were due to expire: Joan Donoghue of the United States, then the President of the Court; Kirill Gevorgian of Russia, then the vice-president of the Court; Mohamed Bennouna of Morocco; Patrick Robinson of Jamaica; and Hilary Charlesworth of Australia. Each was eligible for re-election.

Prior to the election, the composition of the Court was as follows:

Judge	Term starts / renewed	Term ends
(Morocco) Mohamed Bennouna	2006, 2015	2024
(United States) Joan Donoghue, President	2010, 2015	2024
(Jamaica) Patrick Lipton Robinson	2015	2024
(Russia) Kirill Gevorgian, Vice-president	2015	2024
(Australia) Hilary Charlesworth	2021	2024
(France) Ronny Abraham	2005, 2009, 2018	2027
(Somalia) Abdulqawi Yusuf	2009, 2018	2027
(India) Dalveer Bhandari	2012, 2018	2027
(Lebanon) Nawaf Salam	2018	2027
(Brazil) Leonardo Nemer Caldeira Brant	2022	2027
(Slovakia) Peter Tomka	2003, 2012, 2021	2030
(China) Xue Hanqin	2010, 2012, 2021	2030
(Uganda) Julia Sebutinde	2012, 2021	2030
(Japan) Yuji Iwasawa	2018, 2021	2030
(Germany) Georg Nolte	2021	2030

== Candidates ==
=== Qualifications ===
Article 2 of the Statute of the International Court of Justice provides that judges shall be elected "from among persons of high moral character, who possess the qualifications required in their respective countries for appointment to the highest judicial offices, or are jurisconsults of recognized competence in international law".

=== Nomination procedure ===
All States parties to the Statute of the ICJ have the right to propose candidates. Nominations of candidates for election to the ICJ are made by a group consisting of the members of the Permanent Court of Arbitration (PCA), designated by that State. For this purpose, members of the PCA act in "national groups" (i.e. all the PCA members from any individual state). (In the case of UN member states not represented in the PCA, the state in question may select up to four individuals to be its "national group" for the purpose of nominating candidates to the ICJ). Every such "national group" may nominate up to four candidates, not more than two of whom shall be of their own nationality. Before making these nominations, each "national group" is recommended to consult its highest court of justice, its legal faculties and schools of law, and its national academies and national sections of international academies devoted to the study of law.

=== 2023 nominees ===
The following candidates were nominated for the election (grouped according to the informal distribution of seats among United Nations Regional Groups):

Regional group	Vacancy	Candidate	Nominating national groups
Africa	(Morocco) Mohamed Bennouna	(Zambia) Chaloka Beyani	Netherlands, Zambia
Africa	(Morocco) Mohamed Bennouna	(Egypt) Ahmed Amin Fathallah	Egypt
Africa	(Morocco) Mohamed Bennouna	(Democratic Republic of the Congo) Antoine Mindua	China, DR Congo
Africa	(Morocco) Mohamed Bennouna	(South Africa) Dire Tladi	Brazil, Finland, Latvia, Mexico, Portugal, Sierra Leone, South Africa
Eastern Europe	(Russia) Kirill Gevorgian	(Romania) Bogdan Aurescu	Bulgaria, Estonia, Italy, Latvia, Netherlands, Peru, Poland, Portugal, Romania, Sweden
Eastern Europe	(Russia) Kirill Gevorgian	(Russia) Kirill Gevorgian	Belarus, China, Russia
GRULAC	(Jamaica) Patrick Lipton Robinson	(Mexico) Juan Manuel Gómez Robledo Verduzco	Australia, Brazil, Colombia, Denmark, Finland, France, Guatemala, Mexico, Norway, Portugal, Spain, Sweden, United Kingdom, United States
WEOG	(United States) Joan Donoghue	(United States) Sarah Cleveland	Argentina, Australia, Austria, Bahrain, Bangladesh, Brazil, Bulgaria, Cambodia, Canada, Chile, China, Colombia, Czechia, Denmark, Dominican Republic, Estonia, Finland, France, Georgia, Germany, Guatemala, Hungary, India, Ireland, Italy, Japan, Jordan, Latvia, Luxembourg, Malaysia, Malta, Mexico, Morocco, Netherlands, New Zealand, Norway, Peru, Poland, Portugal, Republic of Korea, Romania, Sierra Leone, Singapore, Slovenia, Somalia, Sweden, United Kingdom, United States
WEOG	(Australia) Hilary Charlesworth	(Australia) Hilary Charlesworth	Argentina, Australia, Austria, Bangladesh, Brazil, Canada, China, Colombia, Denmark, Finland, France, Germany, Guatemala, India, Ireland, Italy, Japan, Latvia, Luxembourg, Malta, Mexico, Netherlands, New Zealand, Norway, Peru, Poland, Republic of Korea, Romania, Sierra Leone, Singapore, Slovenia, Sweden, United Kingdom, United States

== Election procedure ==
ICJ judges are elected through parallel procedures at the General Assembly and the Security Council. To be elected, a candidate must obtain an absolute majority of votes both in the General Assembly and in the Security Council.

Each of the two bodies, independently from the other, has to determine five persons enjoying support of an absolute majority of its members. Currently, 97 votes constitute an absolute majority in the General Assembly and 8 votes constitute an absolute majority in the Security Council (with no distinction being made between permanent and non-permanent members of the Security Council).

If less than five persons obtain an absolute majority of votes after the first round of balloting, further rounds are held during the same meeting, involving only those candidates that have not obtained an absolute majority of votes. If more than five persons obtain an absolute majority of votes after the first round of balloting, further rounds are held during the same meeting, involving all candidates, until the number of candidates enjoying an absolute majority of votes, becomes five or less.

When five candidates have obtained the required majority in one of the organs, the president of that organ notifies the president of the other organ of the names of the five candidates. The president of the latter does not communicate such names to the members of that organ until that organ itself has given five candidates the required majority of votes.

After both the General Assembly and the Security Council have produced a list of five names that received an absolute majority of the votes, the two lists are compared. Any candidate appearing on both lists is elected. But if fewer than five candidates have been thus elected, the two organs proceed, again independently of one another, at a second meeting and, if necessary, a third meeting to elect candidates by further ballots for seats remaining vacant, the results again being compared after the required number of candidates have obtained an absolute majority in each organ.

According to the ICJ Statute, if after the third meeting, one or more seats still remain unfilled, the General Assembly and the Security Council may form a joint conference consisting of six members, three appointed by each organ. This joint conference may, by an absolute majority, agree upon one name for each seat still vacant and submit the name for the respective acceptance of the General Assembly and the Security Council. If the joint conference is unanimously agreed, it may submit the name of a person not included in the list of nominations, provided that candidate fulfills the required conditions of eligibility to be a judge on the ICJ. In practice, a joint conference has never been convened. Instead, the Assembly and the Council continued balloting in further meetings until the same candidate received an absolute majority of votes in both bodies (usually after the weaker candidate withdrew).

If the General Assembly and the Security Council ultimately are unable to fill one or more vacant seats, then the judges of the ICJ who have already been elected shall proceed to fill the vacant seats by selection from among those candidates who have obtained votes either in the General Assembly or in the Security Council. In the event of a tie vote among the judges, the eldest judge shall have a casting vote. This procedure has never been used.

== Election ==
Candidate	General Assembly majority = 97	Security Council majority = 8				
Candidate	Round 1; 9 Nov 2023	Round 1; 9 Nov 2023	Round 2; 9 Nov 2023	Round 3; 9 Nov 2023	Round 4; 9 Nov 2023	Round 5; 9 Nov 2023
(Mexico) Juan Manuel Gómez Robledo Verduzco	143	14	13	14	14	13
(United States) Sarah Cleveland	135	14	14	13	13	12
(Romania) Bogdan Aurescu	117	9	10	9	9	9
(Australia) Hilary Charlesworth	117	11	11	11	10	9
(South Africa) Dire Tladi	113	8	8	10	12	10
(Egypt) Ahmed Amin Fathallah	81	8	8	9	8	7
(Zambia) Chaloka Beyani	81	4	2	2	1	1
(Russia) Kirill Gevorgian	77	6	5	6	6	5
(Democratic Republic of the Congo) Antoine Kesia-Mbe Mindua	65	1	1	1	2	2

In parallel and independent voting conducted by secret ballot, the General Assembly (one round of voting) and the Security Council (five rounds of voting) elected Hilary Charlesworth (Australia); Juan Manuel Gómez Robledo Verduzco (Mexico); Bogdan Lucian Aurescu (Romania); Dire Tladi (South Africa); and Sarah Hull Cleveland (United States). Charlesworth was re-elected.

Other candidates in the fray, who were not elected were Antoine Kesia-Mbe Mindua (Democratic Republic of the Congo); Ahmed Amin Fathalla (Egypt); Kirill Gevorgian (Russia); and Chaloka Beyani (Zambia). Russia's Gevorgian lost out his post to Romania's Aurescu, marking the first time in history that the USSR/Russia would not be represented at the ICJ.

== Aftermath ==
After the election, the composition of the Court was as follows:

Judge	Term starts / renewed	Term ends
(France) Ronny Abraham	2005, 2009, 2018	2027
(Somalia) Abdulqawi Yusuf	2009, 2018	2027
(India) Dalveer Bhandari	2012, 2018	2027
(Lebanon) Nawaf Salam	2018	2027
(Brazil) Leonardo Nemer Caldeira Brant	2022	2027
(Slovakia) Peter Tomka	2003, 2012, 2021	2030
(China) Xue Hanqin	2010, 2012, 2021	2030
(Uganda) Julia Sebutinde	2012, 2021	2030
(Japan) Yuji Iwasawa	2018, 2021	2030
(Germany) Georg Nolte	2021	2030
(Australia) Hilary Charlesworth	2021, 2024	2033
(Mexico) Juan Manuel Gómez Robledo Verduzco	2024	2033
(United States) Sarah Cleveland	2024	2033
(Romania) Bogdan Aurescu	2024	2033
(South Africa) Dire Tladi	2024	2033
