= Canada and the Netherlands v. Syrian Arab Republic =

Ongoing International Court of Justice case

- Court: International Court of Justice
- Full case name: Application of the Convention against Torture and Other Cruel, Inhuman or Degrading Treatment or Punishment (Canada and the Netherlands v. Syrian Arab Republic)
- Started: 8 June 2023
- Claim: Violating United Nations Convention Against Torture

Court membership
- Judges sitting: President Joan Donoghue; Vice President Kirill Gevorgian; Judge Peter Tomka; Judge Ronny Abraham; Judge Mohamed Bennouna; Judge Abdulqawi Yusuf; Judge Julia Sebutinde; Judge Dalveer Bhandari; Judge Patrick Lipton Robinson; Judge Nawaf Salam; Judge Yuji Iwasawa; Judge Georg Nolte; Judge Hilary Charlesworth; Judge Leonardo Nemer Caldeira Brant; Judge Xue Hanqin

On 8 June 2023, the governments of Canada and the Netherlands brought a case against Syria before the International Court of Justice accusing the Syrian Government of torture and other cruel, inhuman and degrading treatment and punishment of its own population beginning at least in 2011 (when the Syrian civil war began), and of failing to fulfill its obligations regarding the prohibition against torture violating the United Nations Convention Against Torture.

The Syrian government, in response, criticized the human rights record of Canada and The Netherlands, claimed that they were financing armed terrorist organizations in Syria, that they "serve the agendas of [the ICJ's] political American master", and that the accusations are disinformation and lies. Syria boycotted the first hearing.

The Court approved provisional measures that order Syria to take measures to prevent acts of torture and other cruel, inhuman or degrading treatment and to preserve all evidence related to torture.

== Progress of the case ==
On 18 September 2020, the Netherlands formally notified Syria that it was requesting negotiations pursuant to Article 30(1) of the Convention against Torture, via note verbale. In response, the Syrian government publicly denounced the Netherlands actions and put out a statement that criticized the human rights record of the Netherlands, claiming that they were financing armed terrorist organizations in Syria and that they "serve the agendas of their political American master."

On 3 March 2021, Canada formally notified Syria of its request for negotiations pursuant to Article 30(1) via note verbale to the Permanent Mission of the Syrian Arab Republic to the United Nations. On 12 March, Canada and the Netherlands announced their intention to their joint intention to file the case.

Canada and the Netherlands claimed lengthy efforts over the course of more than two years, and that the dispute could not be settled through negotiation. They formally filed a case against Syria before the International Court of Justice on 8 June 2023. The case accused the Syrian Government of torture and other cruel, inhuman and degrading treatment and punishment of its own population beginning at least in 2011; and failing to fulfill its obligations regarding the prohibition against torture violating the United Nations Convention Against Torture. The International, Impartial and Independent Mechanism (IIM) that was created by the United Nations to investigate crimes in Syria welcomed the case and stated its readiness to support the proceedings. The United States also welcomed the proceedings.

The first hearing was due to open 19 July 2023, but was rescheduled to 10 October 2023. The reschedule was at the request of the Syrian government. Canada and the Netherlands expressed regret over the delay. The Syrian government responded by attacking the case, calling the statements disinformation and lies, claiming again that both countries are supporting terrorists and aggression against Syria, that they lack legitimacy to talk on human rights, and that their history is stained with the crimes that were committed in the colonies and against their country's indigenous population.

=== Hearings ===
On 10 October, the first hearing was held. Canada and the Netherlands presented their oral arguments. Syria did not participate in the oral proceedings and its legal delegation did not attend the hearing.

In their arguments, Canada and the Netherlands requested that Syria:

- Immediately takes effective measures to cease and prevent all acts that amount to or contribute to torture and other cruel, inhuman or degrading treatment or punishment.
- Cease arbitrary detention, and release all persons who are arbitrarily or unlawfully detained.
- Allow access to all of its official and unofficial places of detention by independent monitoring mechanisms.
- Take urgent measures to improve the conditions of all of its official and unofficial detention facilities.
- Disclose the location of the burial sites of persons who died as a result of torture.
- Safeguard any information relating to the cause of death of any detainee and shall not destroy any evidence related to the case

On 16 November 2023, the court approved two provisional measures:

- Syria will take all measures to prevent acts of torture and other cruel, inhuman or degrading treatment.
- Syria shall take effective measures to prevent the destruction and ensure the preservation of any evidence.

Both of them passed with 13 votes to 2, with Russian judge Gevorgian and Chinese judge Xue voting against the ruling. Both Canada and the Netherlands, along with the UN Syria Commission welcomed the ruling in a joint statement. Human Rights Watch called the ruling a milestone toward protecting civilians.

On 1 February 2024, the court set the time limits for the case, specifying 3 February 2025 (extended to 3 June 2025) as the deadline for the Memorial of Canada and the Kingdom of the Netherlands, and 3 February 2026 (extended to 5 October 2026) for the Counter-Memorial of Syria.

== See also ==
- Human rights in Syria
