= United Nations Audiovisual Library of International Law =

Online research and training tool on international law

The United Nations Audiovisual Library of International Law is a free online international law research and training tool. It was created and is maintained by the Codification Division of the United Nations Office of Legal Affairs as a part of its mandate under the United Nations Programme of Assistance in the Teaching, Study, Dissemination and Wider Appreciation of International Law.

== Background ==
The United Nations Audiovisual Library of International Law was established in 2008 under the United Nations Programme of Assistance in the Teaching, Study, Dissemination and Wider Appreciation of International Law as a tool for promoting knowledge of international law.

== Faculty ==
Over 240 international law experts from different regions, legal systems and sectors of the legal profession have recorded lectures for the Lecture Series, prepared introductory notes for the Historic Archives and contributed their scholarly writings to the Research Library.

Notable faculty members as of 1 July 2016:

- Abi-Saab, Georges
- Abraham, Ronny
- Al-Khasawneh, Awn S.
- Annan, Kofi A.
- Bassiouni, M. Cherif
- Bennouna, Mohamed
- Brilmayer, Lea
- Buergenthal, Thomas
- Cançado Trindade, Antônio Augusto
- Cassese, Antonio
- Caron, David
- Charlesworth, Hilary
- Corell, Hans
- Couvreur, Philippe
- Crane, David M.
- Crawford, James
- Donoghue, Joan E.
- Dugard, John
- Ferencz, Benjamin B.
- Gaillard, Emmanuel
- Gaja, Giorgio
- Goldstone, Richard
- Goodwin-Gill, Guy S.
- Greenwood, Christopher
- Heyns, Christof
- Higgins, Rosalyn
- Hossain, Kamal
- Jallow, Hassan Bubacar
- Kälin, Walter
- Keith, Kenneth
- Kingsbury, Benedict
- Klabbers, Jan
- Koh, Harold Hongju
- Koh, Tommy
- Lacarte Muró, Julio
- Lamy, Pascal
- Lauterpacht, Elihu
- Mautner, Menachem
- Mayr-Harting, Thomas
- McDougal, Myres S.
- McWhinney, Edward
- Meron, Theodor
- Michel, Nicolas
- Momtaz, Djamchid
- Odio Benito, Elizabeth
- Oñate Laborde, Santiago
- Owada, Hisashi
- Palmer, Geoffrey
- Paulsson, Jan
- Pellet, Alain
- Perera, Rohan A.
- Pocar, Fausto
- Rodley, Nigel
- Robinson, Patrick
- Rozakis, Christos
- Sarooshi, Dan
- Schabas, William A.
- Scharf, Michael
- Schwebel, Stephen M.
- Sepúlveda Amor, Bernardo
- Shaw, Malcolm
- Shi, Jiuyong
- Simma, Bruno
- Simpson, Gerry
- Song, Sang Hyun
- Tladi, Dire
- Tomka, Peter
- Tomuschat, Christian
- Tuerk, Helmut
- Urquhart, Brian
- van Boven, Theo
- van den Berg, Albert Jan
- van Zyl, Paul
- Vasciannie, Stephen C.
- Vincent, Robin
- Wedgwood, Ruth
- Wiessner, Siegfried
- Wilmshurst, Elizabeth
- Wolfrum, Rüdiger
- Wood, Michael
- Woolcott, Peter
- Xue, Hanqin
- Yusuf, Abdulqawi A.

== Description and contents ==
The Audiovisual Library is divided into three sections: the Historic Archives, the Lecture Series and the Research Library. While the Library's main language is English, many lectures are in other languages (Arabic, Chinese, French, Russian and Spanish) and all entries in the Historic Archives are translated into the six official languages of the United Nations.

=== Historic archives ===
The Historic Archives provides detailed information on the negotiation process and significance of major international legal instruments. Each entry is accompanied by an introductory note prepared by an internationally recognized legal expert, a summary of the instrument's procedural history that led to its adoption and a list of all relevant preparatory documents. In some cases, audiovisual materials, including film footage, audio recordings and photos, of the negotiations are also available. The Historic Archives covers the following overarching subject areas:

- Criminal Law
- Decolonization
- Diplomatic and Consular Relations
- Disarmament
- Education, Science and Culture
- Environmental law
- Health
- Human Rights
- International Economic Law
- International Humanitarian Law
- International Organizations
- Law of International Relations
- Law of Outer Space
- Law of the Sea
- Law of Treaties
- Peace and Security
- Refugees and Stateless Persons
- Succession of States

=== Lecture series ===
The Lecture series contains lectures recorded by members of the international legal community. Individuals who have participated in the Lecture Series include scholars, judges of international and regional judicial bodies, senior officials of international and regional organizations, and other international law practitioners. The themes covered by the Series are:

- Antarctica
- Arctic
- Arms Control and Disarmament
- Boundary Delimitation
- Courts and Tribunals
- Criminal Law and Procedure
- Cultural Heritage
- Development
- Diplomatic and Consular Relations
- Diplomatic Protection
- Disaster Prevention and Relief
- Environmental Law
- Health and Science
- Human Rights
- Human Security
- International Civil Aviation
- International Economic Law
- International Labour Law
- International Law
- International Migration Law
- International Organizations
- International Watercourses
- Law of Armed Conflict
- Law of Outer Space
- Law of the Sea
- Law of Treaties
- Peace and Security
- Peaceful Settlement of Disputes
- Regional Organizations
- Rule of Law, Democracy and Good Governance
- Specialized Agencies and Related Organizations
- States
- United Nations

=== Research Library ===
The Research Library consists of an extensive online catalog of international law materials. The Library provides links to online collections of treaties, jurisprudence of courts and tribunals, official publications and documents of the United Nations and related international organizations, scholarly writings and other research materials including international law journals and yearbooks, as well as other training materials.
