= Legal Consequences of the Separation of the Chagos Archipelago from Mauritius in 1965 =

2019 advisory opinion of the International Court of Justice

- Court: International Court of Justice
- Full case name: Legal Consequences of the Separation of the Chagos Archipelago from Mauritius in 1965, Advisory Opinion
- Decided: 25 February 2019
- Citation: I.C.J. Reports 2019, p. 95

Case history
- Prior action: Request by the United Nations General Assembly in Resolution 71/292 (22 June 2017)
- Subsequent action: Resolution 73/295 (22 May 2019)

Court membership
- Judges sitting: Abdulqawi Yusuf (President), Xue Hanqin (Vice-President), Peter Tomka, Ronny Abraham, Mohamed Bennouna, Antônio Augusto Cançado Trindade, Giorgio Gaja, Julia Sebutinde, Dalveer Bhandari, Patrick Lipton Robinson, Kirill Gevorgian, Nawaf Salam, Yuji Iwasawa, Joan Donoghue

Case opinions
- The decolonisation of Mauritius was not lawfully completed in 1968; the United Kingdom must end its administration of the Chagos Archipelago "as rapidly as possible" (13–1)
- Dissent: Donoghue

Legal Consequences of the Separation of the Chagos Archipelago from Mauritius in 1965 is an advisory opinion given by the International Court of Justice (ICJ) on 25 February 2019 at the request of the United Nations General Assembly. The Court found that the United Kingdom's detachment of the Chagos Archipelago from the colony of Mauritius in 1965 "was not based on the free and genuine expression of the will of the people concerned", that the process of decolonisation of Mauritius "was not lawfully completed" when it became independent in 1968, and that the United Kingdom "is under an obligation to bring to an end its administration of the Chagos Archipelago as rapidly as possible". The substantive findings were adopted by 13 votes to 1, with Judge Joan Donoghue dissenting.

The opinion also examined the removal of the archipelago's inhabitants, the Chagossians. The Court found that between 1967 and 1973 "the entire population of the Chagos Archipelago was either prevented from returning or forcibly removed and prevented from returning by the United Kingdom", and that "By virtue of United Kingdom law and judicial decisions of that country, they are not allowed to return". It described their resettlement as "an issue relating to the protection of the human rights of those concerned, which should be addressed by the General Assembly during the completion of the decolonization of Mauritius". Several judges wrote at length about the Chagossians in separate opinions.

The General Assembly welcomed the opinion in Resolution 73/295 of 22 May 2019. The United Kingdom maintained that the opinion was "advisory and not legally binding". In 2021 a special chamber of the International Tribunal for the Law of the Sea held that its determinations "do have legal effect". In 2025 the United Kingdom and Mauritius signed a treaty under which the United Kingdom accepts Mauritian sovereignty over the archipelago.

== Background ==
From 1814 to 1965 the Chagos Archipelago was administered by the United Kingdom as a dependency of the colony of Mauritius. In 1964 the United Kingdom and the United States began talks on the use of islands in the Indian Ocean for defence purposes, and the United States expressed interest in Diego Garcia. On 8 November 1965 the United Kingdom detached the archipelago from Mauritius to form, with three islands detached from Seychelles, a new colony, the British Indian Ocean Territory (BIOT). On 16 December 1965 the General Assembly, in Resolution 2066 (XX), invited the United Kingdom "to take no action which would dismember the Territory of Mauritius and violate its territorial integrity". Under a 1966 agreement, the United Kingdom made the territory available to the United States for defence purposes, and an American military base was built on Diego Garcia.

Mauritius became independent on 12 March 1968 without the archipelago. Between 1967 and 1973 the whole population of the archipelago was removed or prevented from returning. From 1980 Mauritius and the Organisation of African Unity called for the return of the archipelago. In 2015 an arbitral tribunal in Mauritius v. United Kingdom held that it had no jurisdiction over the dispute about sovereignty, but found that the United Kingdom's 1965 undertaking to return the archipelago when it was no longer needed for defence purposes was legally binding. In 2001 Mauritius had proposed that the two states take the dispute to the ICJ; the United Kingdom did not agree. The United Kingdom's acceptance of the Court's compulsory jurisdiction excluded disputes with Commonwealth states, and in 2004, after Mauritius indicated that it might leave the Commonwealth, the United Kingdom extended the exclusion to states that are or have been members.

== Request ==
On 22 June 2017 the General Assembly adopted Resolution 71/292 by 94 votes to 15, with 65 abstentions. (Note: Paragraph 53 of the opinion gives the date as 23 June 2017. The resolution itself, and paragraph 1 of the opinion, give 22 June 2017.) The resolution recalled "the deep concern expressed" by the African Union and the Non-Aligned Movement "at the forcible removal by the United Kingdom of Great Britain and Northern Ireland of all the inhabitants of the Chagos Archipelago". It asked the Court two questions:

(a) "Was the process of decolonization of Mauritius lawfully completed when Mauritius was granted independence in 1968, following the separation of the Chagos Archipelago from Mauritius and having regard to international law, including obligations reflected in General Assembly resolutions 1514 (XV) of 14 December 1960, 2066 (XX) of 16 December 1965, 2232 (XXI) of 20 December 1966 and 2357 (XXII) of 19 December 1967?"; (b) "What are the consequences under international law, including obligations reflected in the above-mentioned resolutions, arising from the continued administration by the United Kingdom of Great Britain and Northern Ireland of the Chagos Archipelago, including with respect to the inability of Mauritius to implement a programme for the resettlement on the Chagos Archipelago of its nationals, in particular those of Chagossian origin?"

== Proceedings ==
The Court invited the United Nations and its member states to submit written statements, and later admitted the African Union. Thirty-one states and the African Union filed written statements, ten of those states and the African Union filed written comments, and the Court exceptionally admitted a late statement from Niger. The United Nations Secretariat supplied a dossier of documents.

Public hearings were held from 3 to 6 September 2018. Twenty-two states and the African Union made oral statements. Mauritius was represented by its former Prime Minister Sir Anerood Jugnauth and by counsel including Philippe Sands, and the United Kingdom by its Solicitor General, Robert Buckland. A Chagossian woman, Marie Liseby Elysé, who could address the Court only in Kreol, made a statement on behalf of the Mauritian delegation in the form of a video recording. She described the departure from Peros Banhos: "We boarded the ship in the dark so that we could not see our island ... We were like animals and slaves in that ship."

=== Positions of the participants ===
The United Kingdom and some other participants argued that the Court should decline to answer. They contended that the questions raised complex and disputed facts, that the opinion would not assist the General Assembly, that it would reopen matters settled by the 2015 arbitration, and above all that the request concerned a bilateral dispute over sovereignty to which the United Kingdom had not consented. The United Kingdom also argued that Mauritius had freely consented to the detachment in 1965. Other participants argued that the issues could not be separated from the decolonisation of Mauritius. Some argued that the United Kingdom should put an immediate end to its administration and make good the injury to Mauritius, and that it "must co-operate with Mauritius regarding the resettlement on the Chagos Archipelago of the nationals of the latter, in particular those of Chagossian origin"; one participant argued that the only consequence was the return of the archipelago when it was no longer needed for defence.

In its written statement, the United Kingdom accepted that "it treated the Chagossians very badly at and around the time of their removal and it deeply regrets that fact". At the hearings it stated that it "fully accepts that the manner in which the Chagossians were removed from the Chagos Archipelago, and the way they were treated thereafter, was shameful and wrong, and it deeply regrets that fact". Mauritius described the British expressions of regret as "belated and inadequate".

== Opinion ==
=== Jurisdiction and discretion ===
The Court held unanimously that it had jurisdiction, the questions being legal questions asked by an organ entitled to request an opinion. It rejected each argument for declining to answer: it found that it had "sufficient information on the facts", pointing to "an abundance of material" including official records from the 1960s. It held that it was for the General Assembly to judge the usefulness of the opinion, and that the principle of res judicata did not prevent it from giving one. On the bilateral dispute, it held that "The General Assembly has not sought the Court's opinion to resolve a territorial dispute between two States", and that the issues were "located in the broader frame of reference of decolonization". The decision to give the opinion was taken by 12 votes to 2, with Judges Tomka and Donoghue against.

=== Findings of fact on the detachment ===
The Court set out the facts surrounding the detachment, relying largely on British documents of the 1960s.

- Talks with the United States. At the end of talks in February 1964, the British delegation agreed to recommend that the United Kingdom "be responsible for acquiring land, resettling the population and providing compensation". A Foreign Office memorandum considered that the United Kingdom had the constitutional power to detach the islands without Mauritian consent, but that criticism at the United Nations would "lose most of its force" if the Mauritian ministers' acceptance were obtained, and that the detachment might be presented to Mauritius "as 'a fait accompli'". At talks in September 1965 the British side explained that, when defence facilities were installed on an island, "it would be free from local civilian inhabitants".
- Mauritian opposition. The Mauritian Premier, Sir Seewoosagur Ramgoolam, preferred a long-term lease to detachment in 1964, and in July 1965 the Mauritian Council of Ministers opposed detachment. At a meeting on 20 September 1965 he said that the Mauritius government "was not interested in the excision of the islands and would stand out for a 99-year lease". The British Foreign and Defence Secretaries concluded that if Mauritius did not agree they would have to adopt the recommendation of "forcible detachment and compensation paid into a fund".
- The Prime Minister's meeting. A note to the Prime Minister, Harold Wilson, before his meeting with Ramgoolam on 23 September 1965 said that "The object is to frighten him with hope: hope that he might get independence; Fright lest he might not unless he is sensible about the detachment of the Chagos Archipelago". At the meeting Wilson said that the Premier could return to Mauritius "either with Independence or without it", and that Diego Garcia "could either be detached by order in Council or with the agreement of the Premier and his colleagues".
- The Lancaster House agreement. The same day, at Lancaster House, the Mauritian ministers agreed in principle to the detachment in return for undertakings including compensation of up to £3 million "over and above direct compensation to landowners and the cost of resettling others affected in the Chagos Islands", and the return of the islands "if the need for the facilities on the islands disappeared". The next day the British government announced that it favoured independence for Mauritius. On 5 November 1965 the Council of Ministers "confirmed agreement to the detachment". In 1979 Ramgoolam told the Mauritian parliament: "we had no choice".

=== Findings of fact on the Chagossians ===
In a section headed "The Situation of the Chagossians", the Court set out the removal of the islanders and its aftermath. It recorded that their ancestors had been brought from Mozambique and Madagascar in the early nineteenth century and enslaved on coconut plantations, and freed in the 1830s. A confidential minute agreed with the United States in 1966 listed "resettling any inhabitants" among the "administrative measures" the United Kingdom would take. The Court found:

- Removal. Between 1967 and 1973, "the inhabitants of the Chagos Archipelago who had left the islands were prevented from returning. The other inhabitants were forcibly removed and prevented from returning to the islands." "The main forcible removal of Diego Garcia's population took place in July and September 1971."
- The 1971 Ordinance. On 16 April 1971 the BIOT Commissioner made it unlawful for any person to enter or remain in the archipelago without a permit, and gave himself power to order a person's removal.
- Compensation. In 1972 Mauritius accepted £650,000 in discharge of the 1965 undertaking to meet the cost of resettlement; in 1982 the United Kingdom paid £4 million ex gratia, "with no admission of liability". The money was paid to 1,344 islanders in 1983–84, who were required "to sign or to place a thumbprint on a form renouncing the right to return to the Chagos Archipelago. The form was a one-page legal document, written in English, without a Creole translation. Only 12 persons refused to sign."
- Litigation and return. The Court summarised the Chagossians' cases in the English courts, the European Court of Human Rights and the United Nations Human Rights Committee, including the 2004 Orders in Council declaring that no person had a right of abode in the territory, and the British decision of 16 November 2016 against resettlement on the "grounds of feasibility, defence and security interests and cost to the British taxpayer".
- Present situation. "To date, the Chagossians remain dispersed in several countries, including the United Kingdom, Mauritius and Seychelles. By virtue of United Kingdom law and judicial decisions of that country, they are not allowed to return to the Chagos Archipelago."

=== Question (a): lawfulness of decolonisation ===
The Court held that the law to be applied was that of 1965–68, but that it could consider the evolution of the law on self-determination since 1945. It held that Resolution 1514 (XV) of 1960, although "formally a recommendation", has "a declaratory character with regard to the right to self-determination as a customary norm". It found that the right to the territorial integrity of a non-self-governing territory was, at the relevant time, a customary rule and a corollary of self-determination, and that "any detachment by the administering Power of part of a non-self-governing territory, unless based on the freely expressed and genuine will of the people of the territory concerned, is contrary to the right to self-determination".

Applying this, the Court found that the archipelago "was clearly an integral part" of the non-self-governing territory of Mauritius in 1965. On the Lancaster House agreement it held: "it is not possible to talk of an international agreement, when one of the parties to it, Mauritius, which is said to have ceded the territory to the United Kingdom, was under the authority of the latter", and that "heightened scrutiny should be given to the issue of consent in a situation where a part of a non-self-governing territory is separated to create a new colony". Having reviewed the circumstances, it concluded that "this detachment was not based on the free and genuine expression of the will of the people concerned", and that "as a result of the Chagos Archipelago's unlawful detachment and its incorporation into a new colony, known as the BIOT, the process of decolonization of Mauritius was not lawfully completed when Mauritius acceded to independence in 1968".

=== Question (b): consequences ===
The Court held that the United Kingdom's continued administration of the archipelago "constitutes a wrongful act entailing the international responsibility of that State", and "an unlawful act of a continuing character". The United Kingdom was "under an obligation to bring an end to its administration of the Chagos Archipelago as rapidly as possible". The modalities of completing decolonisation were for the General Assembly, and because respect for self-determination is an obligation erga omnes, all member states "must co-operate with the United Nations to put those modalities into effect". On the Chagossians, the Court said only: "As regards the resettlement on the Chagos Archipelago of Mauritian nationals, including those of Chagossian origin, this is an issue relating to the protection of the human rights of those concerned, which should be addressed by the General Assembly during the completion of the decolonization of Mauritius."

=== Operative clause ===
Finding	Vote	Against
The Court has jurisdiction to give the opinion	Unanimous	—
The Court decides to comply with the request	12–2	Tomka, Donoghue
"the process of decolonization of Mauritius was not lawfully completed when that country acceded to independence in 1968, following the separation of the Chagos Archipelago"	13–1	Donoghue
"the United Kingdom is under an obligation to bring to an end its administration of the Chagos Archipelago as rapidly as possible"	13–1	Donoghue
"all Member States are under an obligation to co-operate with the United Nations in order to complete the decolonization of Mauritius"	13–1	Donoghue

== Separate and dissenting opinions ==
Vice-President Xue and Judges Tomka, Abraham, Gevorgian, Salam and Iwasawa appended declarations; Judges Cançado Trindade, Gaja, Sebutinde and Robinson appended separate opinions; Judges Cançado Trindade and Robinson appended a joint declaration; and Judge Donoghue appended a dissenting opinion.

=== On the bilateral dispute and state responsibility ===
Judge Donoghue agreed that the Court had jurisdiction, but considered that the opinion "has the effect of circumventing the absence of United Kingdom consent to judicial settlement of the bilateral dispute between the United Kingdom and Mauritius regarding sovereignty over the Chagos Archipelago and thus undermines the integrity of the Court's judicial function". She added: "Both the events leading to the detachment of the Chagos Archipelago and the treatment of the Chagossians cry out for an authoritative judicial pronouncement." Judge Tomka agreed with the Court's conclusions but not its reasoning, and called for restraint in using the advisory function in a bilateral dispute. Judge Gevorgian supported the opinion but disagreed with its statement in paragraph 177 that the United Kingdom bore international responsibility, which in his view blurred the distinction between the Court's advisory and contentious jurisdiction. Vice-President Xue, by contrast, considered that the Court had properly applied the principle of consent; in her view the detachment was not "a normal administrative restructuring of a colony" but part of a defence strategy, so that "the very root cause of the separation of the Chagos Archipelago lies in the decolonization of Mauritius"; the bilateral dispute had come to the fore through the Chagossians' struggle to return and "was derived from the decolonization process of Mauritius". Judge Iwasawa noted that the Court "neither determines the eventual legal status of the Chagos Archipelago, nor indicates detailed modalities" for self-determination, and that the archipelago is to be regarded as a non-self-governing territory under Chapter XI of the Charter "even though the United Kingdom has not submitted information under Article 73 (e)". In a joint declaration, Judges Cançado Trindade and Robinson considered that the Court should have given more weight to General Assembly resolutions and "should have pronounced on the jus cogens character of the right of peoples to self-determination".

=== On the detachment ===
Judge Sebutinde considered that the opinion omitted important facts about how consent was obtained, noting that the British rejected the Mauritian offer of a 99-year lease, "insisting on forcible excision of the islands subject to compensation", and that "forcible detachment by Order in Council was a very likely fall-back option". Judge Robinson considered that the opinion did not identify sufficiently why the detachment was not freely consented to; in his view the Premier's personal will had been subverted, and the Council of Ministers "was not sufficiently independent of the Governor" to reflect the will of the people, so that its "'consent' ... amounts to nothing". He also considered that the 1966 UK–US agreement, which provided for the removal and resettlement of the inhabitants, conflicted with the right to self-determination, a norm of jus cogens, and was therefore void. Vice-President Xue considered that the British approach to obtaining the "consent" of the Council of Ministers served two contradictory purposes: to show the world that the detachment rested on the self-determination of Mauritius, and to keep the issue out of the 1967 general election in which Mauritians were to decide on independence. Judge Gaja considered that the Council of Ministers "had little choice in the matter", and noted a Foreign Office memorandum stating that its consent "was sought for essentially political reasons". Judge Abraham agreed that the detachment arose from "a unilateral decision of the administering Power, motivated by the pursuit of political, strategic or military advantage", but considered that paragraph 160 of the opinion could be read as giving territorial integrity "a near absolute scope"; in his view the principle did not prevent a colonial territory being divided where the population of part of it freely chose a different path.

=== On the Chagossians ===
Judge Tomka wrote: "I have deep sympathy for the unfortunate Chagossians who were removed from the Archipelago between 1967 and 1973 against their will and who have been prevented from returning." He added that during the critical period they "were not represented in — and defended vigorously enough by — the Government of Mauritius; they were in fact abandoned by the United Nations, which, after 1968, was not interested in their destiny".

Judge Robinson devoted a part of his opinion to "the plight of the Chagossians". He described them as "a people uprooted from their homeland and taken against their will to other places, an act strikingly redolent of the abduction of millions from Africa four centuries ago". He reproduced Elysé's statement in full, and observed that two centuries after her ancestors were brought to the islands and enslaved, "in the hull of the ship she experienced another enslavement". He said that "The right to return to one's country is a basic human right protected by Article 12 of the ICCPR", that "It is the humanity of the Chagossians that has been violated", and that "The story of the Chagossians is a human tragedy that has no place in the twenty-first century". He praised Olivier Bancoult, who had litigated in the British courts for two decades without success, as deserving "a prestigious international award for the courage and tenacity he has shown on behalf of his people".

Judge Sebutinde wrote that, as a result of the detachment, Mauritius' "entire population on the islands was forcibly removed and prevented from returning thereto". In her view the United Kingdom was obliged to "wipe out all the consequences of the unlawful act" — "including the forcible displacement of the Chagossians". Judge Cançado Trindade described the case as "a humanitarian tragedy, this time a long-standing one, of the Chagossians forcibly displaced from their homeland and abandoned to try to survive in intergenerational poverty". In his view "the right to life — of forcibly displaced Chagossians and their descendants — comprises the right to dignified conditions of living".

Judge Gaja wrote that "Establishing a new colony ... in order to construct a military base on the Archipelago and expelling the indigenous population" could not be regarded as consistent with the administering Power's duty under Article 73 of the Charter to promote the well-being of the inhabitants, and that "The Chagossians were never consulted or even represented." He considered that the General Assembly might "take into account the will of the Chagossians who were expelled by the administering Power and of their descendants", adding: "The compensation that many of them received for their displacement does not make their will insignificant under the perspective of self-determination." Judge Abraham observed that "the British authorities at no point consulted or even, it would appear, contemplated consulting the inhabitants of the Chagos Archipelago"; had they been consulted and chosen not to join Mauritius, the question before the Court would in his view have been "substantially different". Judge Salam regretted that the Court "did not expressly mention ... the possibility of compensation for the Chagossians", noting that many participants had raised it and that the Human Rights Committee had recommended compensation for the denial of their right to return; he compared the Court's finding in the Wall opinion that Israel was obliged to compensate those who suffered damage. Vice-President Xue described "The deplorable situation of the displaced Chagossians" as "a lingering issue for the United Kingdom".

== Reception and aftermath ==
=== United Nations ===
On 22 May 2019 the General Assembly adopted Resolution 73/295 by 116 votes to 6, with 56 abstentions. It welcomed the opinion, demanded that the United Kingdom withdraw its colonial administration within six months, and affirmed that "The resettlement of Mauritian nationals, including those of Chagossian origin, must be addressed as a matter of urgency during the completion of the decolonization process". The six-month period ended on 22 November 2019 without the United Kingdom withdrawing.

=== United Kingdom ===
The United Kingdom did not accept the opinion: in its reply to the Secretary-General in 2020 it said that by answering the questions the Court had "enabled Mauritius to circumvent the basic principle that the Court should not consider a bilateral dispute without the consent of both States concerned", and that the opinion had given "insufficient regard" to Mauritius' "freely given consent to enter into the 1965 agreement". It stated that "the opinion of the International Court of Justice is advisory and not legally binding", and that neither the opinion nor the resolution altered "the legal situation, that of a sovereignty dispute between the United Kingdom and Mauritius". It reiterated "its deep regret for the way Chagossians were treated". In July 2019 the Foreign Office minister Sir Alan Duncan told the House of Commons that the United Kingdom remained "committed to seeking resolution of this bilateral sovereignty dispute with Mauritius through direct, bilateral dialogue".

In English litigation, the Court of Appeal held in 2020 that, while recognising a human right relating to resettlement, "neither the Advisory Opinion nor the UN Resolution actually decided anything about that right", since the Court had remitted the question to the General Assembly.

=== International Tribunal for the Law of the Sea ===
In Mauritius/Maldives, a special chamber of the International Tribunal for the Law of the Sea relied on the opinion in rejecting the Maldives' argument that it could not delimit the boundary while the sovereignty dispute remained, holding that the Court's determinations "have unmistakable implications for the United Kingdom's claim to sovereignty", and that, although advisory opinions "cannot be considered legally binding", their determinations "carry no less weight and authority than those in judgments" and "do have legal effect".

=== Negotiations and the 2025 treaty ===
On 3 November 2022 the British Foreign Secretary, James Cleverly, announced that "the UK and Mauritius have decided to begin negotiations on the exercise of sovereignty over the British Indian Ocean Territory (BIOT)/Chagos Archipelago". On 22 May 2025 they signed a treaty under which the United Kingdom accepts that "Mauritius is sovereign over the Chagos Archipelago in its entirety, including Diego Garcia", while retaining Diego Garcia for an initial 99 years; Mauritius is "free to implement a programme of resettlement" on the other islands. United Nations experts and the Committee on the Elimination of Racial Discrimination criticised the treaty for excluding Chagossians from Diego Garcia and called for its ratification to be suspended. Two Chagossian women born on Diego Garcia who opposed the treaty said that they had asked the committee to act. As of November 2026 the treaty had not entered into force.

== See also ==
- Chagossians
- Detachment of the Chagos Archipelago
- Expulsion of the Chagossians
- List of International Court of Justice cases

== Sources ==
=== International Court of Justice ===
- Legal Consequences of the Separation of the Chagos Archipelago from Mauritius in 1965, Advisory Opinion (PDF). I.C.J. Reports 2019. International Court of Justice. 25 February 2019. p. 95.
- Xue, Hanqin (25 February 2019). "Declaration of Vice-President Xue" (PDF). Legal Consequences of the Separation of the Chagos Archipelago from Mauritius in 1965, Advisory Opinion. I.C.J. Reports 2019. International Court of Justice. p. 142.
- Tomka, Peter (25 February 2019). "Declaration of Judge Tomka" (PDF). Legal Consequences of the Separation of the Chagos Archipelago from Mauritius in 1965, Advisory Opinion. I.C.J. Reports 2019. International Court of Justice. p. 148.
- Abraham, Ronny (25 February 2019). "Declaration of Judge Abraham" (PDF). Legal Consequences of the Separation of the Chagos Archipelago from Mauritius in 1965, Advisory Opinion. I.C.J. Reports 2019. International Court of Justice. p. 153.
- Cançado Trindade, Antônio Augusto (25 February 2019). "Separate opinion of Judge Cançado Trindade" (PDF). Legal Consequences of the Separation of the Chagos Archipelago from Mauritius in 1965, Advisory Opinion. I.C.J. Reports 2019. International Court of Justice. p. 156.
- Cançado Trindade, Antônio Augusto; Robinson, Patrick (25 February 2019). "Joint declaration of Judges Cançado Trindade and Robinson" (PDF). Legal Consequences of the Separation of the Chagos Archipelago from Mauritius in 1965, Advisory Opinion. I.C.J. Reports 2019. International Court of Justice. p. 258.
- Donoghue, Joan (25 February 2019). "Dissenting opinion of Judge Donoghue" (PDF). Legal Consequences of the Separation of the Chagos Archipelago from Mauritius in 1965, Advisory Opinion. I.C.J. Reports 2019. International Court of Justice. p. 261.
- Gaja, Giorgio (25 February 2019). "Separate opinion of Judge Gaja" (PDF). Legal Consequences of the Separation of the Chagos Archipelago from Mauritius in 1965, Advisory Opinion. I.C.J. Reports 2019. International Court of Justice. p. 267.
- Sebutinde, Julia (25 February 2019). "Separate opinion of Judge Sebutinde" (PDF). Legal Consequences of the Separation of the Chagos Archipelago from Mauritius in 1965, Advisory Opinion. I.C.J. Reports 2019. International Court of Justice. p. 270.
- Robinson, Patrick (25 February 2019). "Separate opinion of Judge Robinson" (PDF). Legal Consequences of the Separation of the Chagos Archipelago from Mauritius in 1965, Advisory Opinion. I.C.J. Reports 2019. International Court of Justice. p. 294.
- Gevorgian, Kirill (25 February 2019). "Declaration of Judge Gevorgian" (PDF). Legal Consequences of the Separation of the Chagos Archipelago from Mauritius in 1965, Advisory Opinion. I.C.J. Reports 2019. International Court of Justice. p. 335.
- Salam, Nawaf (25 February 2019). "Declaration of Judge Salam" (PDF). Legal Consequences of the Separation of the Chagos Archipelago from Mauritius in 1965, Advisory Opinion. I.C.J. Reports 2019. International Court of Justice. p. 338.
- Iwasawa, Yuji (25 February 2019). "Declaration of Judge Iwasawa" (PDF). Legal Consequences of the Separation of the Chagos Archipelago from Mauritius in 1965, Advisory Opinion. I.C.J. Reports 2019. International Court of Justice. p. 340.
- Written Statement of the United Kingdom (PDF). International Court of Justice. 15 February 2018.
- Written Comments of the Republic of Mauritius (PDF). Vol. I. International Court of Justice. 15 May 2018.

=== Other courts and tribunals ===
- Dispute concerning delimitation of the maritime boundary between Mauritius and Maldives in the Indian Ocean (Mauritius/Maldives), Preliminary Objections, Judgment (PDF). ITLOS Reports 2020–2021. International Tribunal for the Law of the Sea. 28 January 2021. p. 17.
- R (Hoareau and Bancoult) v Secretary of State for Foreign and Commonwealth Affairs, EWCA Civ 1010 (Court of Appeal 30 July 2020).

=== United Nations and government documents ===
- United Nations General Assembly (22 June 2017). Resolution adopted by the General Assembly on 22 June 2017: 71/292. Request for an advisory opinion of the International Court of Justice on the legal consequences of the separation of the Chagos Archipelago from Mauritius in 1965 (A/RES/71/292) (Report). United Nations.
- United Nations General Assembly (22 June 2017). Official Records, Seventy-first session, 88th plenary meeting, Thursday, 22 June 2017 (A/71/PV.88) (Report). United Nations.
- United Nations General Assembly (24 May 2019). Resolution adopted by the General Assembly on 22 May 2019: 73/295. Advisory opinion of the International Court of Justice on the legal consequences of the separation of the Chagos Archipelago from Mauritius in 1965 (A/RES/73/295) (Report). United Nations.
- United Nations General Assembly (22 May 2019). Official Records, Seventy-third session, 83rd plenary meeting, Wednesday, 22 May 2019, 10 a.m. (A/73/PV.83) (Report). United Nations.
- "General Assembly Welcomes International Court of Justice Opinion on Chagos Archipelago, Adopts Text Calling for Mauritius' Complete Decolonization (GA/12146)" (Press release). United Nations. 22 May 2019.
- United Nations Secretary-General (18 May 2020). Advisory opinion of the International Court of Justice on the legal consequences of the separation of the Chagos Archipelago from Mauritius in 1965: Report of the Secretary-General (A/74/834) (Report). United Nations.
- "Agreement between Mauritius and the UK fails to guarantee rights of Chagossians, say UN experts" (Press release). Office of the United Nations High Commissioner for Human Rights. 10 June 2025.
- Committee on the Elimination of Racial Discrimination (2 December 2025). Decision 1 (2025): Mauritius and the United Kingdom (early warning and urgent action procedure, INT/CERD/EWU/11263), advance unedited version (Report). Office of the United Nations High Commissioner for Human Rights.
- "Chagos Islands: UN General Assembly Resolution". Hansard, House of Commons. 3 July 2019.
- Permanent Mission of the United Kingdom to the United Nations (19 January 2023). Note No. 004/23 to the Secretary-General, with the Written Ministerial Statement of 3 November 2022 (PDF) (Report). United Nations.
- Agreement between the Government of the United Kingdom of Great Britain and Northern Ireland and the Government of the Republic of Mauritius concerning the Chagos Archipelago including Diego Garcia (CS Mauritius No.1/2025, CP 1334) (Report). Foreign, Commonwealth and Development Office. 22 May 2025.

=== Books and news ===
- "Chagossian activists challenge legality of new bilateral agreement". Seychelles Nation. 10 June 2025.
- Stacey, Kiran (5 November 2026). "Burnham wants to 'recast' Chagos Islands deal after US resistance". The Guardian.
- Burri, Thomas; Trinidad, Jamie, eds. (2021). The International Court of Justice and Decolonisation: New Directions from the Chagos Advisory Opinion. Cambridge University Press. doi:10.1017/9781108893770. ISBN 978-1-108-89377-0.
- Sengupta, Somini (22 June 2017). "U.N. Asks International Court to Weigh In on Britain-Mauritius Dispute". The New York Times.
- Arjanee, Ameerah (2 October 2026). "UK-Mauritius Chagos sovereignty deal stalls amid fears of further delays". Al Jazeera English.
