= 2014 International Court of Justice judges election =

The 2014 International Court of Justice election began on 6 November 2014 at United Nations Headquarters in New York City. In the set of triennial elections, the General Assembly and the Security Council concurrently elect five judges to the Court for nine-year terms, in this case beginning on 6 February 2015. From the nine candidates, the five winners were Mohamed Bennouna (Morocco), Joan Donoghue (United States), Kirill Gevorgian (Russia), James Crawford (Australia) and Patrick Lipton Robinson (Jamaica).

== Background ==
The International Court of Justice (ICJ), based in The Hague, is one of the principal organs of the United Nations. Also known as the World Court, it adjudicates legal disputes between states, and provides advisory opinions on legal questions submitted by other UN organs or agencies.

The court consists of 15 judges, with five judges elected every three years. (In the case of death or other vacancy, a judge is elected for the remainder of the term.) Judges are required to be independent and impartial; they may not exercise any political or administrative function, and do not act as a representative of their home state.

Elections of members of the Court are governed by articles 2 through 15 of the Statute of the International Court of Justice.

Prior to the election, the composition of the Court was as follows:

Judge	Term starts / renewed	Term ends
(Morocco) Mohamed Bennouna	2006	2015
(Mexico) Bernardo Sepúlveda Amor	2006	2015
(Russia) Leonid Skotnikov	2006	2015
(New Zealand) Kenneth Keith	2006	2015
(United States) Joan Donoghue	2010	2015
(France) Ronny Abraham, President	2005, 2009	2018
(Somalia) Abdulqawi Yusuf, Vice-President	2009	2018
(United Kingdom) Christopher Greenwood	2009	2018
(India) Dalveer Bhandari	2012	2018
(Brazil) Antônio Augusto Cançado Trindade	2009	2018
(Slovakia) Peter Tomka	2003, 2012	2021
(Japan) Hisashi Owada	2003, 2012	2021
(China) Xue Hanqin	2010, 2012	2021
(Uganda) Julia Sebutinde	2012	2021
(Italy) Giorgio Gaja	2012	2021

The seats of Judges Sepúlveda Amor, Keith, Bennouna, Skotnikov and Donoghue were thus to be contested at the 2014 election. Judges Bennouna and Donoghue stood for re-election, while the other three did not.

== Candidates ==
=== Qualifications ===
Article 2 of the Statute of the ICJ provides that judges shall be elected “from among persons of high moral character, who possess the qualifications required in their respective countries for appointment to the highest judicial offices, or are jurisconsults of recognized competence in international law”.

=== Nomination procedure ===
Nominations of candidates for election to the ICJ are made by individuals who sit on the Permanent Court of Arbitration (PCA). For this purpose, members of the PCA act in "national groups" (i.e. all the PCA members from any individual country). (In the case of UN member states not represented in the PCA, the state in question may select up to four individuals to be its "national group" for the purpose of nominating candidates to the ICJ.)

Every such "national group" may nominate up to four candidates, not more than two of whom shall be of their own nationality. Before making these nominations, each "national group" is recommended to consult its highest court of justice, its legal faculties and schools of law, and its national academies and national sections of international academies devoted to the study of law.

=== 2014 nominees ===
By a communication dated 31 January 2014, the Secretary-General of the United Nations invited the "national groups" to undertake the nomination of persons as judges of the ICJ, and submit the nominations no later than 30 June 2014.

The nominated candidates for the 2014 election (grouped according to the informal distribution of seats among United Nations Regional Groups) were as follows:

Regional group	Vacancy	Candidate	Nominating national groups
Africa	(Morocco) Mohamed Bennouna	(Mauritania) Jemal Agatt	Mauritania
Africa	(Morocco) Mohamed Bennouna	(Madagascar) Eugénie Liliane Arivony	Madagascar
Africa	(Morocco) Mohamed Bennouna	(Morocco) Mohamed Bennouna	Argentina, China, Denmark, Finland, France, Iceland, Morocco, Norway, Peru, Russia, Spain
Africa	(Morocco) Mohamed Bennouna	(Democratic Republic of the Congo) Sayeman Bula-Bula	Democratic Republic of the Congo
Eastern Europe	(Russia) Leonid Skotnikov	(Russia) Kirill Gevorgian	Belarus, China, Colombia, France, Greece, Japan, Morocco, Peru, Republic of Korea, Russian Federation, Slovakia, United Kingdom, United States
GRULAC	(Mexico) Bernardo Sepúlveda Amor	(Argentina) Susana Ruiz Cerutti	Argentina, Australia, Brazil, Colombia, France, Germany, Iceland, Morocco, Peru, Spain
GRULAC	(Mexico) Bernardo Sepúlveda Amor	(Jamaica) Patrick Lipton Robinson	Canada, Finland, Jamaica, Italy, Slovakia, Sweden, United Kingdom
WEOG	(New Zealand) Kenneth Keith	(Australia) James Crawford	Argentina, Australia, Austria, Canada, China, Colombia, Costa Rica, Croatia, Denmark, Finland, Germany, Greece, Iceland, Italy, Malaysia, Malta, Mexico, Morocco, Netherlands, New Zealand, Norway, Poland, Slovakia, Sweden, Thailand, United Kingdom, Viet Nam
WEOG	(United States) Joan Donoghue	(United States) Joan Donoghue	Australia, Austria, Canada, China, Colombia, Denmark, France, Greece, Iceland, Ireland, Italy, Mexico, Netherlands, New Zealand, Norway, Peru, Republic of Korea, Russian Federation, Slovakia, Sweden, United Kingdom, United States

== Election procedure ==
The General Assembly and the Security Council proceed, independently of one another, to elect five members of the Court.

To be elected, a candidate must obtain an absolute majority of votes both in the General Assembly and in the Security Council. The words “absolute majority” are interpreted as meaning a majority of all electors, whether or not they vote or are allowed to vote. Thus 97 votes constitute an absolute majority in the General Assembly and 8 votes constitute an absolute majority in the Security Council (with no distinction being made between permanent and non-permanent members of the Security Council).

Only those candidates whose names appear on the ballot papers are eligible for election. Each elector in the General Assembly and in the Security Council may vote for not more than five candidates on the first ballot and, on subsequent ballots for five less the number of candidates who have already obtained an absolute majority.

When five candidates have obtained the required majority in one of the organs, the president of that organ notifies the president of the other organ of the names of the five candidates. The president of the latter does not communicate such names to the members of that organ until that organ itself has given five candidates the required majority of votes.

After both the General Assembly and the Security Council have produced a list of five names that received an absolute majority of the votes, the two lists are compared. Any candidate appearing on both lists is elected. But if fewer than five candidates have been thus elected, the two organs proceed, again independently of one another, at a second meeting and, if necessary, a third meeting to elect candidates by further ballots for seats remaining vacant, the results again being compared after the required number of candidates have obtained an absolute majority in each organ.

If after the third meeting, one or more seats still remain unfilled, the General Assembly and the Security Council may form a joint conference consisting of six members, three appointed by each organ. This joint conference may, by an absolute majority, agree upon one name for each seat still vacant and submit the name for the respective acceptance of the General Assembly and the Security Council. If the joint conference is unanimously agreed, it may submit the name of a person not included in the list of nominations, provided that candidate fulfills the required conditions of eligibility to be a judge on the ICJ.

If the General Assembly and the Security Council ultimately are unable to fill one or more vacant seats, then the judges of the ICJ who have already been elected shall proceed to fill the vacant seats by selection from among those candidates who have obtained votes either in the General Assembly or in the Security Council. In the event of a tie vote among the judges, the eldest judge shall have a casting vote.

== Election ==
=== Day 1: 6 November 2014 ===
Candidate	Security Council majority = 8				General Assembly majority = 97						
Candidate	R1	R2	R3	R4	R1	R2	R3	R4	R5	R6	R7
(United States) Joan Donoghue	14	14	14	14	155	152	158	160	157	158	156
(Morocco) Mohamed Bennouna	13	13	14	14	147	152	156	165	161	161	159
(Russia) Kirill Gevorgian	14	14	15	15	143	150	151	154	147	147	145
(Jamaica) Patrick Lipton Robinson	8	8	8	7	136	136	149	141	138	141	139
(Australia) James Crawford	13	13	13	12	135	136	140	144	141	138	141
(Argentina) Susana Ruiz Cerutti	9	9	9	9	124	118	104	116	108	108	95
(Democratic Republic of the Congo) Sayeman Bula-Bula	3	3	2	3	42	25	21	–	–	–	–
(Madagascar) Eugénie Liliane Arivony	1	1	0	0	50	31	24	–	–	–	–

The Mauritanian delegation withdrew the candidacy of Jemal Agatt prior to the first round of voting. The Congolese and Madagascan delegations withdrew the candidacies of Sayeman Bula-Bula, and Eugénie Liliane Arivony respectively prior to the fourth round of voting in the General Assembly. Having received majority support in both the General Assembly and the Security Council, Mohamed Bennouna, James Crawford, Joan Donoghue, and Kirill Gevorgian were elected to the Court at the end of the first day of voting.

=== Day 2: 7 November 2014 ===
On Day 1, the Security Council and the General Assembly, independently from one another, each held a meeting in order to select five candidates, and no more, who enjoyed majority support in the respective body. After the first meeting of each body, four candidates received the absolute majority of votes in both. One seat at the Court remained vacant. On Day 2, the Council and the Assembly proceeded to elect a judge to fill that seat, out of the two candidates who remained in the race. Technically, each time a candidate received majority support in one of the bodies, the respective meeting of that body was over and the two bodies compared results of their votes. If the same candidate received majority support, he or she would be elected to the Court. If different candidates received majority support, then each body proceeded to a new vote, technically at a new meeting.

Candidate	Meeting 2		Meeting 3		Meeting 4		Meeting 5		Meeting 6		Meeting 7		Meeting 8	
Candidate	SC	GA	SC	GA	SC	GA	SC	GA	SC	GA	SC	GA	SC	GA
(Argentina) Susana Ruiz Cerutti	9	77	9	71	9	69	9	68	9	65	9	64	9	61
(Jamaica) Patrick Lipton Robinson	6	115	6	121	6	123	6	121	6	125	6	127	6	130

At every meeting, Patrick Lipton Robinson received majority support at the General Assembly, while Susana Ruiz Cerutti received majority support at the Security Council. Due to the impasse, further rounds of voting were postponed in order to allow delegations time for consultations.

=== Day 3: 17 November 2014 ===
Prior to the third day of voting the Argentine delegation withdrew the candidacy of Susana Ruiz Cerutti.

Candidate	Meeting 9	
Candidate	SC	GA
(Jamaica) Patrick Lipton Robinson	15	185

Patrick Lipton Robinson was thus elected for the last vacant seat at the Court.

== Aftermath ==
After the election, the composition of the Court was as follows:

Judge	Term starts / renewed	Term ends
(France) Ronny Abraham	2005, 2009	2018
(Somalia) Abdulqawi Yusuf	2009	2018
(United Kingdom) Christopher Greenwood	2009	2018
(India) Dalveer Bhandari	2012	2018
(Brazil) Antônio Augusto Cançado Trindade	2009	2018
(Slovakia) Peter Tomka	2003, 2012	2021
(Japan) Hisashi Owada	2003, 2012	2021
(China) Xue Hanqin	2010, 2012	2021
(Uganda) Julia Sebutinde	2012	2021
(Italy) Giorgio Gaja	2012	2021
(Morocco) Mohamed Bennouna	2006, 2015	2024
(United States) Joan Donoghue	2010, 2015	2024
(Russia) Kirill Gevorgian	2015	2024
(Australia) James Crawford	2015	2024
(Jamaica) Patrick Lipton Robinson	2015	2024
