= Rohingya genocide case =

2019 International Court of Justice case

Application of the Convention on the Prevention and Punishment of the Crime of Genocide (The Gambia v. Myanmar)
- Court: International Court of Justice
- Started: 11 December 2019
- Decided: 19 November 2026
- Citation: Application of the Convention on the Prevention and Punishment of the Crime of Genocide (The Gambia v. Myanmar)

The Application of the Convention on the Prevention and Punishment of the Crime of Genocide (The Gambia v. Myanmar), commonly referred to as the Rohingya genocide case, was a case heard by the International Court of Justice (ICJ). The case was brought by the Republic of The Gambia, on behalf of 57 members of the Organisation of Islamic Cooperation in 2019. On 19 November 2026, the ICJ found "that Myanmar committed acts falling under … the genocide convention with an intent to destroy a substantial part of the Rohingya population in Myanmar".

== Background ==
The Rohingya people are a Muslim Indo-Aryan ethnic minority which has faced mass persecution and ethnic cleansing in Myanmar in recent years. The persecution of the Rohingya has been described as a genocide. Successive Myanmar governments and many elected officials have considered them illegal immigrants. But the Rohingya people argue they have lived in the area for generations and that the government of Myanmar's treatment of them is unfair to the Muslims of Myanmar as a whole.

According to The Economist, regarding Aung San Suu Kyi's motivation for taking up the defendants' cause, "It is hard to escape the conclusion that she is exploiting the Rohingyas' misery to boost her party's prospects in elections due in 2020."

Aung San Suu Kyi described this conflict as an "internal armed conflict" that was triggered by Rohingya attacks on the government of Myanmar. In 2020, the judge who presided over the case, Abdulqawi Ahmed Yusuf, gave Myanmar four months to implement his rulings: Myanmar must take "all measure within its power" to prevent genocide, until further investigation could take place, and to report back in four months.

== Procedural history ==
=== Application and provisional measures ===
The Gambia filed an application instituting proceedings against Myanmar at the International Court of Justice (ICJ) on 11 November 2019, accusing Myanmar's military of committing genocidal acts against the Rohingya people during clearance operations in Rakhine State. After three days of public hearings in December 2019, the Court issued a unanimous order for provisional measures on 23 January 2020. The order directed Myanmar to prevent all acts prohibited under Article II of the Genocide Convention, ensure that its military and irregular armed units did not commit or conspire to commit genocide, and preserve relevant evidence.

Analyzing the decision in the blog of the European Journal of International Law, Marko Milanovic, a professor at the University of Nottingham School of Law, called the Court's order of provisional measures "obviously a win for The Gambia, and for the Rohingya cause more generally", but also stated that the order largely only replicated existing "state obligations under the Genocide Convention", and did not include the broader measures and statements that The Gambia had requested.

=== Preliminary objections and junta representation ===
Control of Myanmar's legal defense shifted after the 2021 Myanmar coup d'état, when representatives appointed by the ruling State Administration Council replaced the civilian government's legal team and submitted four preliminary objections. Myanmar argued that the Court lacked jurisdiction and that The Gambia, as a non-injured party, lacked standing to bring the dispute. On 22 July 2022, the ICJ rejected all four objections, holding that it possessed jurisdiction under Article IX of the Genocide Convention and affirming that any state party may invoke another state's obligations erga omnes.

=== Written pleadings and third-party interventions ===
The case then moved into the written merits phase, encompassing Myanmar's counter-memorial, The Gambia's reply, and Myanmar's rejoinder. Alongside the main parties' filings, eleven states, including Canada, France, Germany, the Netherlands, and the United Kingdom, invoked Article 63 of the Statute of the International Court of Justice to intervene and submit observations on the legal construction of the Genocide Convention.

=== Merits hearings and judgment ===
Oral arguments on the merits took place in January 2026, culminating in the Court's final judgment on 19 November 2026. The ICJ found that Myanmar had breached its obligations under the Genocide Convention by committing acts of genocide against the Rohingya population in northern Rakhine State. As remedies, the Court ordered Myanmar to cease ongoing violations, prosecute perpetrators, guarantee non-repetition, and provide reparations to victims.

== Verdict ==
The ICJ delivered its verdict on 19 November 2026, finding "that the only reasonable inference that can explain Myanmar's actions is an intention to destroy a substantial part of the group, namely the Rohingya population in northern Rakhine", and that Myanmar "committed acts" that violated parts of the Genocide Convention.

=== Main findings ===
9 in favor, 6 opposed -- committed genocide against the Rohingya group in northern Rakhine State, in violation of its obligations under the Genocide Convention.

9 in favor, 6 opposed -- violated its obligation to prevent genocide committed by individuals acting alongside its security forces.

14 in favor, 1 opposed -- did not violate the Convention through direct and public incitement to genocide by private persons in northern Rakhine State.

11 in favor, 4 opposed -- violated its obligation to punish genocide and other prohibited acts under the Convention.

14 in favor, 1 opposed -- violated its obligation under Article V of the Genocide Convention to enact the necessary legislation to give effect to its provisions.

=== Remedial findings ===
By a vote of 14 in favor and 1 opposed, the court ordered that Myanmar must cease this ongoing violation by enacting legislation giving full effect to its obligations under the Convention. By a vote of 13 in favor and 2 opposed, the court ordered Myanmar to take immediate and effective steps to investigate everyone reasonably suspected of committing genocide or other prohibited acts during the 2017 operations, prosecute those responsible where the evidence warrants prosecution, and punish those found guilty. By a vote of 9 in favor and 6 opposed, the court ordered that Myanmar must provide assurances and guarantees that violations of the Genocide Convention will not happen again.

=== Restitutional findings ===
By a vote of 10 in favor and 5 opposed, the court ordered that Myanmar must allow and facilitate the safe, voluntary and dignified return of Rohingya displaced by its wrongful actions, whether they are in Bangladesh, elsewhere abroad or displaced within Myanmar. It must also return or replace in kind all individual and collective Rohingya property lost or damaged as a result of its wrongful actions. It must also facilitate searches for disappeared Rohingya and assist in recovering, identifying and respectfully reburial of victims' bodies according to Rohingya traditions. It must also provide rehabilitation for Rohingya who suffered physical or psychological injuries. It must also ensure that Rohingya are protected against discrimination and persecution. It must also facilitate the reunification of families.

=== Compensatory findings ===
By a vote of 10 in favor and 5 opposed, the court ordered that Myanmar must compensate the Rohingya community and individual victims for damage that cannot be repaired through restitution.

=== Spoliation findings ===
By a vote of 11 in favor and 4 opposed, the court found that Myanmar constructed at least one government base on the site of a former Rohingya village in 2021, and burned and destroyed the remnants of at least five Rohingya villages in May 2020, and that these actions violated its obligation to preserve evidence in accordance with paragraph 86(3) of the court's 2020 provisional measures order.

=== Reporting and further proceedings ===
By a vote of 10 in favor and 5 opposed, the court decided that Myanmar must submit a report within two years setting out the restitution measures it has adopted and, where full restitution is materially impossible, specifying the amount and modalities of compensation.

== Reactions ==
=== Rohingya ===
In the Rohingya refugee camps of Cox's Bazar, Bangladesh, many people followed the ruling through social media or large televised gatherings. The finding of genocide elicited celebration and relief for many. Particularly important was the promise of restitution, which stipulates their return to their homeland in Myanmar. The Arakan Rohingya Salvation Army and the Rohingya Solidarity Organisation praised the ruling, with ARSA regarding it as an "important step towards justice" while calling on the UN and international community to ensure Myanmar's compliance with the ruling.

=== Myanmar ===
The Myanmar military government rejected the ruling as "unfair", noting that it was not unanimous with only nine of the fifteen judges voting in favour. It continued to deny the genocide allegations and questioned the ICJ's authority to impose conditions on the country. Myanmar's government-in-exile, the National Unity Government, reaffirmed its respect for the ruling and ICJ's authority. Arakan Army spokesperson, Khaing Thu Kha, stated to the pro-Rakhine One Nation News that, "Standing firmly on truth and justice, we will act and take a stance as appropriate and necessary for the interests of the Arakan region." The Karen National Union urged ASEAN and the UN to engage with Rohingya communities and the Arakan Army to link humanitarian efforts.

=== International ===
Amnesty International described the ruling as "historic", saying it provided an "authoritative recognition" of the atrocities committed against the Rohingya and represented a "rare moment of justice for survivors, victims and their families". It urged the Burmese government to comply with the ICJ's ruling immediately and called on all other states, including ASEAN member states, to fulfil their obligations under the Genocide Convention and general international law by taking all possible measures to prevent and punish genocide. Justice for All called for targeted economic sanctions against Myanmar's oil and gas sector and other networks supplying its military. It also urged the United States to support a UN General Assembly resolution requiring Myanmar to comply with the ruling and establishing international monitoring. The organisation also supports a reparations fund to support Rohingya education, protection, citizenship and safe return. Human Rights Watch urged governments to support the Rohingya, promote accountability for the atrocities, press Myanmar's military government to comply with the ruling and ensure the safe and voluntary return of refugees.

UN Secretary-General António Guterres welcomed the judgment as a "powerful recognition of the Rohingya victims of genocide". UN high commissioner for human rights Volker Türk said the judgment was "historic" and particularly striking for the way it examined "the decades of discrimination and marginalization of the Rohingya". A US State Department spokesperson said in a statement that they are "studying the decision to fully assess its implications”and stressed the importance of “the proper interpretation of the Genocide Convention and preventing politicization of the ICJ". Guo Jiakun, a spokesperson of Ministry of Foreign Affairs of China, said China had concerns regarding such issues as "ultra vires jurisdiction" and "overreach in interpretation", which were not conducive to the settlement of disputes. He also stated that the Chinese ICJ jurist Xue Hanqin, who voted in Myanmar's favor, performed her duties independently.

== See also ==
- Bosnian genocide case
- Croatia–Serbia genocide case
- Ukraine v. Russian Federation (2022)
- South Africa's genocide case against Israel
- List of International Court of Justice cases
