= AVL =

AVL may refer to:

- Automatic vehicle location
- Acadèmia Valenciana de la Llengua (Valencian Language Academy)
- Anti-Villain League, a fictitious international crime fighting organization in the Despicable Me media franchise and the movie Minions: The Rise of Gru
- The United Nations Audiovisual Library of International Law
- Asheville Regional Airport in North Carolina, IATA airport code
- Automatic Volume Limiter, limits the volume of a device such as an MP3 or CD player
- Avenel railway station, Australia
- AVL tree, a data structure named after inventors Adelson-Velsky and Landis that is used in computer programming
- American Vampire League, a political organization advocating for Vampire rights in the HBO show True Blood.

aVL may refer to:

- Lead augmented vector left (aVL), a voltage difference in electrocardiography
