= AVLS =

AVLS could refer to:

- Automatic vehicle location system
- Automatic volume limiter system
