= Sarah Cleveland =

American judge (born 1965)

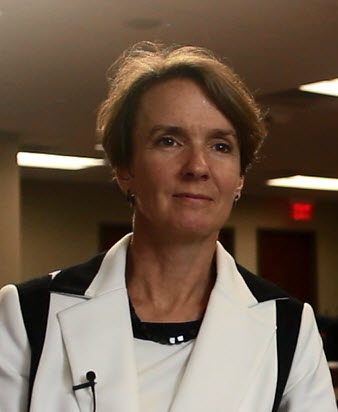

Judge of the International Court of Justice
- Incumbent
- Assumed office February 6, 2024
- Preceded by: Joan Donoghue

Personal details
- Born: September 4, 1965 (age 61) New York City, U.S.
- Education: Brown University (BA); Lincoln College, Oxford (MSt); Yale University (JD)

Sarah Hull Cleveland (born September 4, 1965) is an American judge, lawyer, law professor, and former State Department official who is a judge on the International Court of Justice and the Louis Henkin Professor of Human and Constitutional Rights at Columbia Law School (currently on leave of absence).

Cleveland is an expert in public international law, international and comparative human rights, international humanitarian law, national security law, constitutional law of U.S. foreign relations, and federal civil procedure. She has served as the Counselor on International Law in the U.S. State Department, an independent expert on the United Nations Human Rights Committee, the Co-Coordinating Reporter of the American Law Institute's project on the Restatement (Fourth) of the Foreign Relations Law of the United States, the U.S. Independent Member on the Venice Commission of the Council of Europe, and a Member of the Media Freedom Coalition's independent High Level Panel of Legal Experts on Media Freedom.

== Early life and education ==
Cleveland grew up in Alabama and in 1987 earned a Bachelor of Arts with honors from Brown University, where she was elected to Phi Beta Kappa. As a Rhodes Scholar in 1989, she earned an M.St. in British Imperial and Commonwealth history from Lincoln College, Oxford University. In 1992, she earned a J.D. from Yale Law School.

== Legal career ==
=== Judicial clerkships and fellowship ===
Immediately after law school, Cleveland clerked for Judge Louis F. Oberdorfer on the United States District Court for the District of Columbia, and then for Justice Harry Blackmun of the Supreme Court of the United States during the 1993–1994 term.

She represented migrant farmworkers in South Florida, as a Skadden Fellow, from 1994 to 1996.

=== Academic positions and writing ===
Cleveland taught at the University of Texas Law School from 1997 to 2007, as Assistant Professor, Professor of Law, and finally Marrs McLean Professor in Law.

In 2007 she joined the faculty of Columbia Law School, where she is the Louis Henkin Professor of Human and Constitutional Rights (on leave of absence). She has also served as faculty co-director of the law school's Human Rights Institute.

Cleveland has served as a visiting professor at Harvard Law School, the University of Michigan Law School, the University of Tokyo, Sciences Po University (Paris), Paris-Panthéon-Assas University (Paris II), the University of Oxford (on a George Washington University summer program), the Graduate Institute of International and Development Studies (in Geneva), Leiden University, and the European University Institute (in Italy).

Cleveland has written widely, including several dozen scholarly articles, on issues of international law, human rights, and U.S. foreign relations law. She is a co-author of Louis Henkin's Human Rights casebook (2nd ed. 2009 and update 2013) and a co-editor of The Restatement and Beyond: The Past, Present, and Future of U.S. Foreign Relations Law (Oxford University Press, 2020).

From 2012 to 2018, as Co-Coordinating Reporter with Professor Paul Stephan of the University of Virginia School of Law, she oversaw the preparation of the American Law Institute's Restatement (Fourth) of the Foreign Relations Law of the United States.

She has been involved in international law and human rights litigation in the United States and before the Inter-American Court of Human Rights.

=== Public service (United States and international) ===
From 2009 to 2011, Cleveland served as the Counselor on International Law to the Legal Adviser at the U.S. Department of State, where she supervised the office's legal work relating to the law of war, counterterrorism, and Afghanistan and Pakistan, and assisted with its international human rights and international justice work.

From 2011 to 2023, she served as a member of the Secretary of State's Advisory Committee on International Law.

The United States named Cleveland as the independent U.S. Observer Member (2010-2013) and then Member (2013-2019) of the Venice Commission of the Council of Europe.

In March 2014, the U.S. Government nominated Cleveland to serve as an independent expert on the Human Rights Committee. The committee, the United Nations treaty body that monitors implementation of the International Covenant on Civil and Political Rights, holds three month-long meetings annually to review state implementation of the multilateral treaty. The states party to the treaty elected her to the committee on June 24, 2014. She served a four-year term on the committee from 2015 to 2018. On the committee, Cleveland was Special Rapporteur for Follow-up to Concluding Observations (2015-2017), Special Rapporteur for New Communications and Interim Measures (2017-2018), and Vice Chairperson (2018).

In July 2019, Lord Neuberger appointed Cleveland to the Media Freedom Coalition's independent High Level Panel of Legal Experts on Media Freedom.

On August 10, 2021, President Joe Biden nominated Cleveland to be the Legal Adviser of the Department of State.

In August 2022, the United States National Group to the Permanent Court of Arbitration nominated Cleveland as the U.S. candidate for election as a judge on the International Court of Justice. The national groups of over 50 other states also nominated her. In the 2023 ICJ election on November 9, 2023, the UN General Assembly and Security Council each elected her, from nine candidates for five seats, to a nine-year term (2024-2033). She is the sixth woman elected to the Court since it was established in 1945. She was sworn in as a member of the Court on February 6, 2024.

=== Memberships of boards and institutions ===
Cleveland has served as a member of the American Law Institute, a Council Member of the International Bar Association's Human Rights Institute, a Commissioner of the International Commission of Jurists, a member of the Executive Council of the American Society of International Law, and a member of the board of directors of Human Rights First. She served on the boards of editors of the Journal of International Economic Law, the International Review of the Red Cross, and the Columbia Journal of Transnational Law.

== Personal life ==
Cleveland has two children.

== Awards and honors ==
- Rhodes Scholar (1987)
- University of Texas School of Law, Excellence in Teaching Award (2000-2001)
- U.S. Department of State, Certificate of Appreciation (2011)
- Columbia International Law Society, Excellence in International Law Teaching Award (2014)
- Instituto Universitario de Yucatán (Mexico), Doctorado Honoris Causa (2020)
- American Society of International Law, Robert E. Dalton Award, for The Restatement and Beyond: The Past, Present, and Future of U.S. Foreign Relations Law (2022)

== Selected publications ==
- Louis Henkin, Sarah H. Cleveland, Laurence R. Helfer, Gerald L. Neuman, Diane F. Orentlicher, Human Rights (Foundation Press, 2nd ed., 2009, and 2013 update)
- Paul B. Stephan and Sarah H. Cleveland, eds., The Restatement and Beyond: The Past, Present, and Future of U.S. Foreign Relations Law (Oxford University Press, 2020).

== See also ==
- List of law clerks for the second seat of the Supreme Court of the United States
