= Haitian National Truth and Justice Commission =

National Truth and Justice Commission
- Commission Nationale de Vérité et de Justice

Agency overview
- Formed: 1 April 1995
- Dissolved: February 1996
- Type: Truth commission
- Jurisdiction: Haiti

Haiti's National Truth and Justice Commission (French: Commission Nationale de Vérité et de Justice, CNJV) began its operations in April 1995 and ended in February 1996. The country's once diverse and lively civil society had been tarnished greatly as a result of the ousting of its first democratically elected president, Jean-Bertrand Aristide, by its military forces. This deposing of President Aristide is widely known as a coup d'état, and from 1991 to 1994, the country became known for its weak civilian government. The army was determined to return Haiti to the intimidated society existing during the Duvalier dictatorship seven years prior.

== Background ==
=== Duvalier dictatorship ===
The Duvalier regime of the late 1960s and the early 1970s is partly to blame for the coup d'état that occurred resulting in Aristide's removal from power the first time. Duvalier was elected president with the help of the United States and a Haitian populace that was enduring a previous coup d'état that occurred in 1950. Once in office, the Haitian President, François "Papa Doc" Duvalier, had the Haitian constitution rewritten so that no other President could succeed him, despite his term legally ending on May 15, 1963. Duvalier remained Haiti's president until his death on April 21, 1971, ending the reign of the most corrupt President in Haiti's history. Most of Haiti's governments have been corrupt, essentially making him the most prestigious in this field so far.

The oppression in Haiti resulting from Duvalier's regime was evident. With much aid from the United States throughout this period, Haiti provided him with five palaces, the Tonton Macoute, (which was his own private police force), and many sources of income. At the time, Haiti's literacy rate was ten percent, fifty percent infant mortality rate, fifteen percent of budget went in operations, while 85 percent went to the staff and associates of Duvalier.

Little of Papa Doc's mandate favored Haitian citizens and their human rights. With the Tonton Macoute intimidating all threatening oppositions by forcing activists to leave the country or by ascertaining liberties or apportioning assets. Many executions were disguised, as exiles and sources state that as many as 2000 people could be executed in the span of one month during this dictatorship.

=== Jean-Bertrand Aristide (1990–91) ===
Being Haiti's first democratically elected president, coming out of a very harsh dictatorship, the Haitian populace welcomed Aristide with open arms. He symbolized change in a time that previously lacked hope in Haiti. Despite the people voting Aristide into office, he still had much of the Duvalier military to worry about and they had a very different opinion of the changes that were occurring in 1990. They became hostile towards the newly elected president and were able to assert their dominance of the island quickly as a result of their military weapons and training. Only a year into Aristide's presidency, he found himself removed from power by an army led by commander-in-chief, Raoul Cédras, who had overseen many accounts of human rights violations without holding any of his section chiefs responsible.

The three year coup d'état brought systematic oppression for the citizens of Haiti, which was maintained through intimidation from a violent military who were said to be responsible for numerous beatings, killings and disappearances which led to the destruction of civil society in the country.

As a result of the worsening conditions in Haiti, the United Nations and the Organization of American States imposed international sanctions against Haiti because of the corrupt powers terrorizing and controlling the island. It was expected that Aristide would return as president of Haiti October 1993, but military deterrence pushed his return to power back as far as July of the next year. The deciding factor allowing Aristide to return to office was the 20,000 United States troops and the United Nations persuading support.

== Commission nationale de vérité et de justice (CNVJ) ==
The CNVJ was appointed by presidential decree six months after Aristide returned to office. This commission was established to seek and identify the instigators, perpetrators, and accessories to the many human rights violations and crimes against humanity following the military control of government from September 1991 to October 1994, both inside and outside the country. The commission was implemented in order to aid the country in reconciliation and to recover the truth about the human rights violations in the given time period. The hope of the commissioners was to provide a guideline for legal recourse and a way of helping the country move forward.

The commission was required to submit a report that many felt was unfinished to an extent, mainly because Aristide was being pressured to hand the presidency over to his elected successor, and the mandate specifically expressed that the report had to be handed directly to Aristide. In the end the mandate was intended for everybody to access. Even though the report included the testimonies of the public, time and financial constraints that made it difficult for the report to provide details of what was discovered. A bright spot in the report was that it revealed names of almost 9,000 victims from the period along with the particular abuse that was inflicted upon them.

The initiative is largely credited to the Haitian diaspora as the impetus toward establishing a truth and justice commission initially came from Haitians abroad.

== Mandate of the CNVJ ==
The mandate of the CNVJ was to begin an investigation regarding human rights violations that occurred during the three year coup d'état that began on September 30, 1991, until Aristide's return to power in October 1994.

"To globally establish the truth concerning the most serious Human Rights violations perpetrated between September 29, 1991, and October 15, 1994, inside and outside the country and help to the reconciliation of all Haitians without any prejudice against seeking legal action based on these violations." Quote from Jean-Bertrand Aristide upon establishing the CNVJ's mandate.

=== Commissioners ===
The commission consisted of seven commissioners, including two women and five men. It was supported by the joint Organization of American States (OAS) and United Nations Mission to Haiti (International Civilian Mission in Haiti, MICIVIH). Including the chair of the commission, four of the commissioners were Haitian nationals, a number of whom had been living in exile (commission chair Françoise Boucard, Ertha Elysee, and René Magloire), and the final three were representatives of the international community (Patrick Robinson, Oliver Jackman, and Bacre Waly Ndiaye). Throughout the tenure of the commission, the CNVJ conducted 8,650 interviews with people uncovering 19,308 violations.

== Final report ==
The CNVJ's final report was submitted to Aristide on February 5, 1996. The commission had centered its findings on the testimonies gathered by forty Haitian and foreign rights investigators throughout the country in the summer of 1995. During the commission's investigation, they quickly discovered that they had to stress the safety of victims coming to testify because many of them feared retaliation as a result of their testimony. This caused the commission to take the path of discretion during their investigation to put victims at ease once they made the decision to speak out. Information soon got out to many popular organizations in Haiti, which allowed most of the population to obtain knowledge of the commission's ongoing investigation. Despite the commission's activity in the country being common knowledge to the important organizations, they actually added to the efficiency of the investigation by notifying even more citizens. With these institutions' influence, the inclination of the Haitian populace to testify increased, even though many were still threatened by the presence of known human rights violators walking around in immediate areas. In almost three months the CNVJ received more than seven thousand complaints from Haitian citizens. The human rights violations expressed in these complaints were documented thoroughly with questions created by the commission. In addition to the complaints the commission received, they used secondary information from local and international organizations (this included the UN-OAS Civil Mission in Haiti). These secondary sources were essential to help validate the information given in the numerous complaints submitted.

The commission had to distinguish what classified as outstanding evidence against the perpetrators of human rights violations. They established three types of supporting evidence for different types of violations. They accepted testimonies that were backed by sufficient evidence which means that there was more proven facts supporting the testimony than opposing it. If the information gathered could not be contradicted by any other information then it was deemed to be "overwhelming evidence". The third distinction was if the evidence was extremely supportive to a finding of the commission, it was deemed to be "substantial evidence". These distinctions were used when testimonies revealed a violators name, which proved to be important because this was the goal of the mandate. The information given to the commission by thousands of victims, which revealed many perpetrators by name, was undermined by time constraints restricting the commission to perform thorough investigations of the accused. Some violators had numerous complaints towards them because they exercised most of their human rights violations in the same area, being observed by most community members.

Once the victim testimonies were collected, they had to be carefully analyzed regionally, pertaining to the targets, planners and displays of repression cruelty. The commission opened special investigations pertaining to certain types of cruelty, such as sexual abuse and subjugation of the press.

The CNVJ prioritized investigations that pointed to the repression of government in a large scale, more than anything else. Truth commissions in the past, such as the UN Commission for El Salvador, prioritized a smaller number of cases that impacted the country's society overall. It was the CNVJ's desire to essentially develop a summary of the repression. To contrast the UN Commission of El Salvador with the CNVJ, the commission in El Salvador did fewer but more detailed investigations which provided for more quality cases against named perpetrators to be done. The UN Commission for El Salvador had to do this because they had to worry about a twelve-year period of human rights violations as opposed to the Haitian mandate only having to worry about a three-year period of repression. As a result, the CNVJ's investigation had to be broader than that of the UN Commission for El Salvador.

Reconciliation was also emphasized in the mandate of the CNVJ. The commission was not meant to be the reason for national reconciliation but to aid it, by revealing the truth regarding the past human rights violations that occurred in Haiti. The commission was implemented by executive order to provide guidance and influence rooted from the recommendations made to the Haitian government so the nation could move forward.

== Update ==
Many of the victims are still waiting for justice for the terrors they endured during the coup d'état of 1991–1994, but a few important trials were held, specifically ones involving the Raboteau massacre and the Carrefour-Feuilles killings. The case regarding Raboteau ended in November 2000 and as many as fifty accused perpetrators were convicted. This included everybody in the military high command and the leaders of the paramilitary Front pour l'Avancement et le Progrès Haïtien (FRAPH). On May 3, 2005, the Supreme Court overturned the verdicts given to fifteen of the former members of the FRAPH, none of whom were imprisoned at the time.

The testimonies the commission based its findings on would have been more structured if the commission had been able to gain access to the U.S. government information regarding the FRAPH. Without this information from the United States, the testimonies lacked the quality needed for them to hold their ground. The United States documents concerning the FRAPH were finally returned to Haiti in early 2000, which was one of the final priorities of the Clinton Administration.

== See also ==
- Truth and reconciliation commission
