= Allegations of genocide in Donbas =

Part of the Russo-Ukrainian War

Russia has falsely claimed that Ukraine has committed genocide against Russian Ukrainians living in the Donbas since the beginning of the Russo-Ukrainian War in 2014. This allegation was repeated by Russia's president Vladimir Putin with regard to the War in Donbas, which involved heavy fighting between Ukraine and Russian separatists for eight years, and was ultimately cited by him as a cause for the Russian invasion of Ukraine in 2022. There is no evidence to support the allegation and it has been widely rejected among the international community.

In response to Russia's allegation, Ukraine submitted a case to the International Court of Justice (ICJ), asserting that Putin's government had used false rhetoric to justify the "special military operation" in Ukraine and also highlighting "acts of genocide" in and beyond Russian-occupied Ukrainian territory. During the proceedings of Ukraine v. Russian Federation, the ICJ stated that it had found no evidence of a genocide of Russians by Ukraine, with the International Association of Genocide Scholars expressing the same view. Further reports by 30 scholars of genocide and international law warned of Russia's engagement in the "accusation in a mirror" technique, which was indicative of the Russian incitement to commit genocide against Ukrainians.

== War in Donbas ==
=== Demographics of eastern Ukraine ===
There are numerous Russian-speaking populations living in the eastern and southern Ukraine, and the Russian-speaking population accounts for the vast majority in the two regions of Donetsk and Luhansk (the Donbas) in eastern Ukraine. These regions however are still ethnically Ukrainian, with ethnic Russians being a minority. Immediately after the 2014 Revolution of Dignity in Ukraine, armed Russian proxies declared the independence of the two regions, triggering the war in Donbas. At the same time, the pro-European government in Kyiv began to gradually use the Ukrainian language to replace the dominant position of Russian in Ukraine.

An excerpt from a speech given by former Ukrainian president Petro Poroshenko, taken out of context, began spreading on social media. He appeared to claim, among other things, that he will force children in Donbas to sleep in cellars and that he will restrict Donbas residents from accessing any public services. In his full speech, Poroshenko does not claim that Ukraine will mistreat Donbas residents, but rather that the occupation of Donbas by pro-Russian separatists is causing suffering for local residents. Therefore, by comparing their appalling living conditions with those of Ukrainian citizens, Ukraine could win the war in Donbas simply due to popular discontent on the other side.

=== Question of civilian casualties ===
Altogether, about 14,300 people were killed in the Donbas War, both soldiers and civilians. According to the Office of the United Nations High Commissioner for Human Rights, 6,500 were Russian proxy forces, 4,400 were Ukrainian forces, and 3,404 were civilians on both sides of the frontline. The vast majority of civilian deaths were in the first year, and the death rate in the Donbas War was actually falling before the 2022 Russian invasion: in 2019, there were 27 conflict-related civilian deaths; in 2020, there were 26 deaths; and in 2021, there were 25 deaths; over half of them from mines and unexploded ordnance.

=== Casus belli for Russia's invasion of Ukraine ===
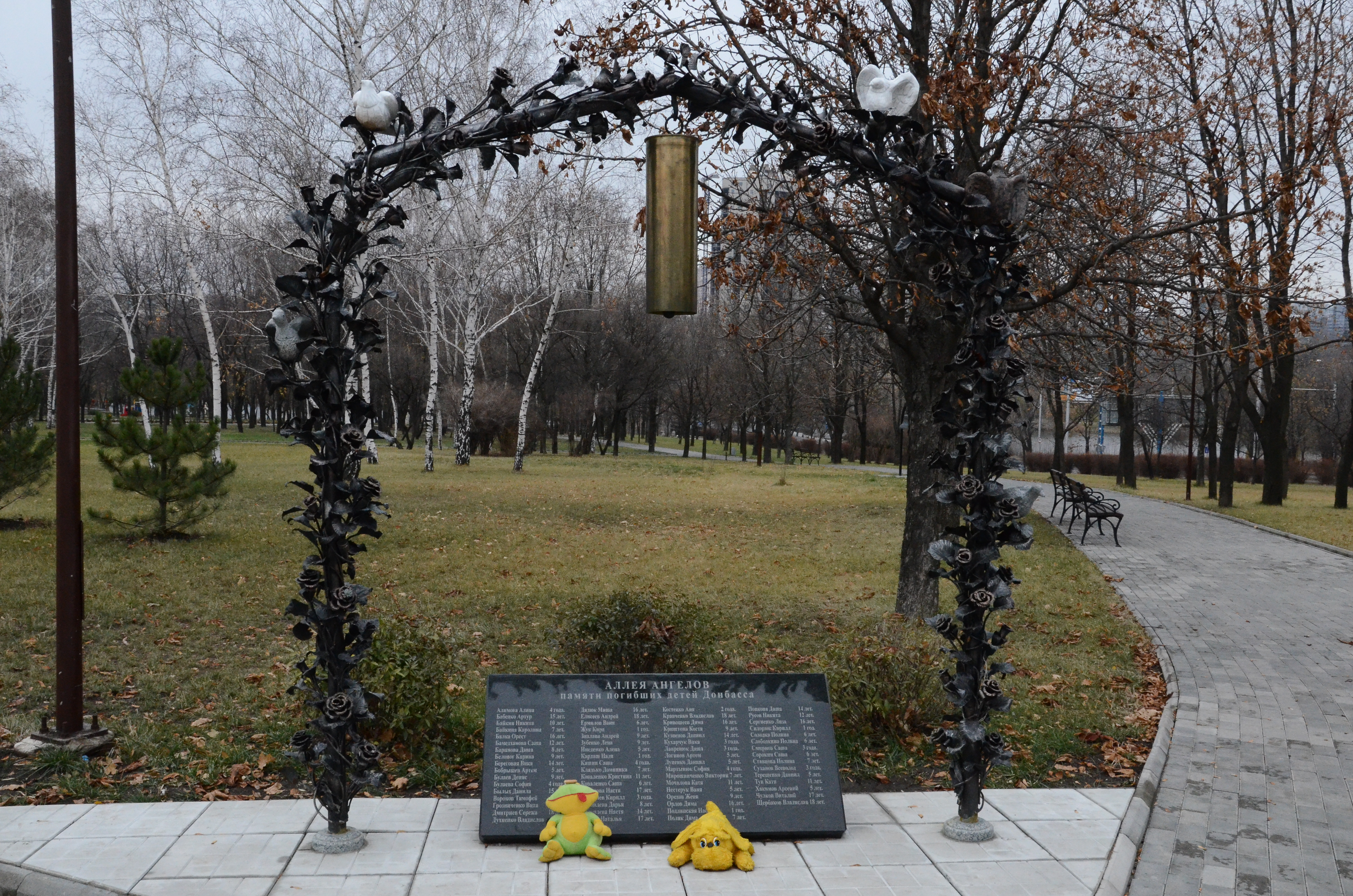
"Alley of Angels" monument in occupied Donetsk in November 2015, used by Russian propaganda to assert that Ukraine was engaged in a genocide of Russian Ukrainians.

Since 2014, the Russian government has accused Ukraine of persecuting Ukrainians in the Donbas region of eastern Ukraine with threats of violence or death, and Russian president Putin compared the situation to genocide in 2015, 2019, and 2021.

On 23 February 2022, the day before the Russian invasion of Ukraine, Ukraine called on the international community at the United Nations General Assembly to stop Russia's plans of aggression. Russia's permanent representative to the United Nations, Vasily Nebenzya, said: "In view of the blatant genocide and the most important the human rights of the people of the world—the right to life are violated, and our country cannot remain indifferent to the fate of the four million people of the Donbas."

At a meeting with the Civic Chamber of the Russian Federation on 3 November 2023 Russian president Vladimir Putin claimed that after the 2014 Revolution of Dignity, Ukraine "began to exterminate Russians in Donbas."

== Reactions ==
The Organization for Security and Cooperation in Europe (OSCE), which has been monitoring the conflict in Ukraine from 2014 to 31 March 2022, has stated it had never found any evidence to support Russia's allegations.

On 7 March 2022, Ukraine filed a complaint with the International Court of Justice (ICJ), stating that Russia's allegations of genocide were untrue and in no case could provide a legal basis for the invasion. On 16 March the International Court of Justice stated it had seen no evidence of genocide, and ruled that Russia must "immediately cease its military operations in Ukraine". it added: "Ukraine has a reasonable right not to accept military action by the Russian Federation to prevent and punish the so-called genocide in Ukraine."

The International Association of Genocide Scholars (IAGS) issued a statement in February 2022, on behalf of more than 300 genocide experts, condemning Russia's "misuse of the term genocide" to "justify its own violence". Melanie O'Brien, president of the IAGS, said "there is absolutely no evidence that a genocide is taking place in Ukraine".

In February 2022, German Chancellor Olaf Scholz dismissed Putin's claims as "ridiculous", saying there was no evidence of genocide in eastern Ukraine.

== See also ==
- Disinformation in the Russian invasion of Ukraine
  - "Where have you been for eight years?"
- Russian war crimes in Ukraine
  - Allegations of genocide of Ukrainians in the Russo-Ukrainian War
- War and genocide
