= Dire Tladi =

South African jurist (born 1975)

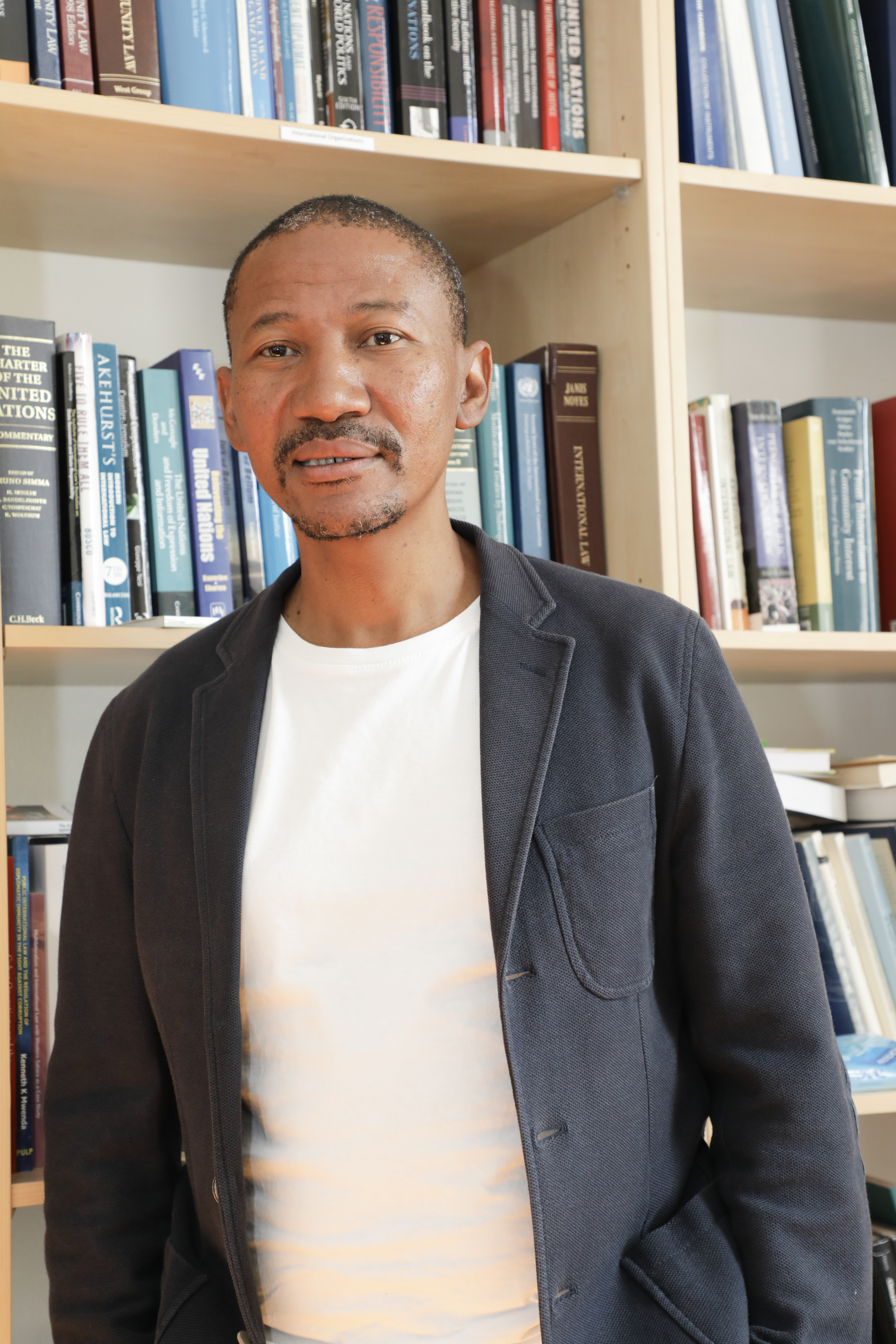

Judge of the International Court of Justice
- Incumbent
- Assumed office 6 February 2024
- Preceded by: Mohamed Bennouna

Personal details
- Born: 20 April 1975 (age 51) Garankua, (Northwest of Pretoria, South Africa)
- Education: University of Pretoria
- Occupation: Law Professor

Dire Tladi (born 20 April 1975) is a Judge at the International Court of Justice and Distinguished Visiting Professor at the University of Johannesburg. He has served as the Principal State Law Adviser for International Law for the South African Department of International Relations and Cooperation and Legal Counsellor to the South Africa Mission to the United Nations.

He serves as a South African judge of the International Court of Justice since 6 February 2024.

His main academic specializations are in public international law, human rights law, environmental law and international criminal law. From 2012 to 2022, he served as a member of the United Nations International Law Commission.

== Education ==
Dire Tladi earned his BLC and LLB degree cum laude from the University of Pretoria, (South Africa), an LL.M. from the University of Connecticut (USA) and a LLD (International law) from the Erasmus University (Netherlands).

He is currently co-editor in chief of the South African Yearbook of International Law. He has served on the editorial board for the Pretoria University Law Press (PULP) journal Constitutional Court Review. He also serves on the editorial board of the Journal of Practice of International Courts and Tribunals.

In addition to more than 50 scholarly publications, Dire Tladi has also published a novel, Blood in the Sand of Justice, based on a fictional account of the assassination of the Prosecutor of the International Criminal Court.

Since his appointment at the end of May 2015, Professor Tladi is leading the United Nations International Law Commission, as Special Rapporteur, to give content to Jus Cogens, by identifying how rules and norms are elevated to the status of Jus Cogens and determining the impact of these norms.

In 2020, Tladi was appointed by the National Research Foundation as the South African Research Chair for Constitutional International Law starting 2021.

== Selected bibliography ==
Books

- Peremptory Norms of General International Law (Jus Cogens): Disquisitions and Disputations (Brill, 2021)
- The Trialogues on War and Peace: Vol I Use of Force Against Non-State Actors O’Connell, Tams and Tladi (series editors: Anne Peters and Christian Marxsen)(Cambridge, 2019)
- Duagrd's International Law: A South African Perspective (Juta, 2018) (With J Dugard, M du Plessis and T Maluwa)
- The Pursuit of a Brave New World in International Law: Essays in Honour of John Dugard (Brill 2017) (with Maluwa and du Plessis)
- Sustainable Development in International Law: An Analysis of Key Enviro-Economic Instruments (2007) PULP ISBN 0-9585097-9-4

Journal Articles

- ‘The International Law Commission’s Draft Conclusions on Peremptory Norms of General International Law (Jus Cogens): Making Wine out of Water or More Water than Wine’ (2020) 89 Nordic Journal of International Law
- ‘The Constitutional Court’s Judgment in the SADC Tribunal Case: International Law Continues to Befuddle’ (2020) 10 Constitutional Court Review 129
- ‘Populisms Attack on Multilateralism and International Law: Much Ado About Nothing’ (2020) Chinese Journal of International Law https://doi.org/10.1093/chinesejil/jmaa028
- ‘The Use of Force against Syria in Response to Alleged Use of Chemical Weapons by Syria: A Return to Humanitarian Intervention? (2019) 79 Zeitschrift für ausländisches öffentliches Recht und Völkerrecht 205
- ‘Codification, Progressive Development, New Law, Doctrine, and the Work of the International Law Commission on Peremptory Norms of General International Law (Jus Cogens): Personal Reflections of the Special Rapporteur’ (2019) 13 Florida International University Law Review 1189
- ‘An Institutional Framework for Addressing Marine Genetic Resources under the Proposed Treaty for Marine Biological Diversity in Areas Beyond National Jurisdiction” (2019) 19 International Environmental Agreements: Politics, Law and Economics 485
- ‘The International Law Commission’s Recent Work on Exceptions to Immunities: Charting a Brave New Course for International Law?’ (2019) Leiden Journal of International Law 169
- ‘The interpretation and identification of international law in South African” (2018) 135 South African Law Journal 708
- ‘Of Heroes and Villains, Angels and Demons: The ICC-AU Tension Revisited” (2017) German Yearbook of International Law 43
- ‘The International Law Commission’s Draft Articles on the Protection of Persons in the Event of Disasters: Codification, Progressive Development or Creation of Law from Thin Air?’ (2017) 16 Chinese Journal of International Law 425
- ‘Immunities, Crimes against Humanity and Other Topics in the Sixty-Ninth Session of the International Law Commission’ (2017) South African Yearbook of International Law
- (with Aniel de Beer) “The Prohibition of Terrorism as a Norm of Jus Cogens’ (2017) South African Yearbook of International Law
- ‘Interpretation and International Law in South African Courts: The Supreme Court of Appeal and the Al Bashir Saga’ (2016) 16 African Human Rights Law Journal 310
- ‘The Duty on South Africa to Arrest and Surrender President Al Bashir under South African and International Law’ (2016) 13 Journal of International Criminal Justice 1027
- ‘Progressively Developing and Codifying International Law: The Work of the International Law Commission in its Sixty-Eighth Session’ (2016) 41 South African Yearbook of International Law 165
- ‘Assessing the Legality of Coalition Air Strikes Targeting Islamic State in Iraq and the Levant (ISIS) in Syria under International Law’ (2015) South African Yearbook of International Law 281
- ‘The Proposed Implementing Agreement: Options for Coherence and Consistency in the Establishment of Marine Protected Areas’ (2015) 30 International Journal of Marine and Coastal Law 654
- ‘Progressively Developing and Codifying International Law: The Work of the International Law Commission at Sixty-Seventh Session’ (2015) 40 South African Yearbook of International Law 205
- ‘National Commissioner of the South African Police Service v Southern African Human Rights Litigation Centre (Sup Ct App S Afr) – Introductory Note’ (2015) 54 International Legal Materials 152
- ‘Immunity in the Era of “Criminalisation”: The African Union, the ICC and International Law’ (2015) 58 Japanese Yearbook of International Law 17*
- ‘The Common Heritage of Mankind and the Proposed Treaty on Areas Beyond National Jurisdiction’ (2014) 25 Yearbook of International Environmental Law 113
- ‘The Immunity Provisions in the AU Amendment Protocol: Separating the (Doctrinal) Wheat from the Normative (Chaff)’ (2015) 13 Journal of International Criminal Justice 3
- Strict Positivism, Moral Arguments, Human Rights and the Security Council: South Africa and the Myanmar Vote (2008 ) ISSN 1609-073X
- Of course humans: a contextual defense of intergenerational equity (2002)

Lectures

- Immunities and the Obligation to Cooperate under the Rome Statute in the Lecture Series of the United Nations Audiovisual Library of International Law
- Use of Force in Self-Defence against Non-State Actors in International Law in the Lecture Series of the United Nations Audiovisual Library of International Law
- Conservation and Use of Marine Biodiversity in Areas Beyond National Jurisdiction in the Lecture Series of the United Nations Audiovisual Library of International Law
- The Security Council, the Al Qaida Sanctions Regime and Due Process in the Lecture Series of the United Nations Audiovisual Library of International Law
