= Automatic volume limiter system =

Setting to limit maximum volume

An automatic volume limiter system (AVLS) is an option that limits the maximum volume level and is enabled through software or hardware in stationary or portable media player devices used with headphones such as the Walkman or Sony PSP. The aim of this feature is to stop the headphones drowning out all other noise, and to limit the noise from the headphones being heard by other people. It can also prevent listeners from damaging their hearing. This volume limit can be set by the manufacturer or customized by the user.
