= Joan Donoghue =

American judge (born 1956)

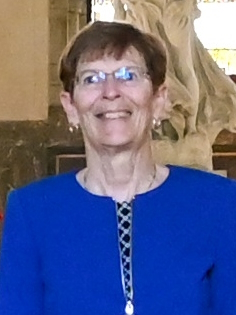
- Donoghue in 2022

President of the International Court of Justice
- In office February 8, 2021 – February 6, 2024
- Vice President: Kirill Gevorgian
- Preceded by: Abdulqawi Yusuf
- Succeeded by: Nawaf Salam

Judge of the International Court of Justice
- In office September 13, 2010 – February 6, 2024
- Preceded by: Thomas Buergenthal
- Succeeded by: Sarah Cleveland

Legal Adviser of the Department of State
- Acting
- In office March 23, 2009 – June 25, 2009
- President: Barack Obama
- Preceded by: John Bellinger
- Succeeded by: Harold Koh

Personal details
- Born: December 12, 1956 (age 69) Yonkers, New York, U.S.
- Education: University of California, Santa Cruz (BA); University of California, Berkeley (JD)

Joan E. Donoghue (born December 12, 1956) is an American lawyer, international legal scholar, former U.S. State Department official, and former president of the International Court of Justice (ICJ). She was first elected to the court in 2010, re-elected in 2014, and elected by the ICJ judges to be president of the ICJ in 2021. She was the third woman to be elected to the ICJ and the first American woman elected as president of the court.

== Education and career ==
Donoghue graduated from the University of California, Santa Cruz, with honors degrees in Russian studies and biology in 1978. She subsequently received her Juris Doctor from the University of California, Berkeley School of Law in 1981. From 1981 to 1984, she was an attorney in private practice at Covington & Burling, focusing on federal courts and litigation.

In the 1980s, Donoghue acted as an attorney-advisor for the U.S. in Nicaragua v. United States. She was the general counsel of Freddie Mac from 2003 to 2005, and served as Principal Deputy Legal Adviser at the United States State Department from 2007 to 2010, including as State Department Acting Legal Adviser in 2009. She previously served as the Office of the Legal Adviser's Deputy Legal Adviser (2000–2001) Assistant Legal Adviser for Economic and Business Affairs (1994–1999); African Affairs (1993–1994); and Oceans, Environment, and Science (1989–1991). She also served as deputy general counsel of the U.S. Treasury Department, overseeing all aspects of the department's work, including international financial institutions.

== International Court of Justice ==
Donoghue was elected to the ICJ on September 9, 2010, to fill the place left vacant by the resignation of Thomas Buergenthal. Pursuant to the Statute of the International Court of Justice, Donoghue completed the remainder of the nine-year term for which Buergenthal had been elected, which expired on February 5, 2015.

Donoghue's name had been the only nomination for this ICJ vacancy received by the secretary-general within the specified time. In the General Assembly, Donoghue received 159 votes out of 167 valid ballots with 8 abstentions. In the Security Council, she received all 15 votes. Donoghue was sworn in as a member of the ICJ on September 13, 2010.

Donoghue was only the fourth woman elected to be a member of the court since 1945. Of the court's 15 members, four are now female (the others are Xue Hanqin, Julia Sebutinde, and Hilary Charlesworth).

In 2014, Donoghue was nominated for a second term on the ICJ by the U.S. National Group of the Permanent Court of Arbitration (The Hague), and was re-elected with 156 votes in the first round of voting at the International Court of Justice judges election, 2014.

As an ICJ judge, she issued a dissenting opinion in the case Legal Consequences of the Separation of the Chagos Archipelago from Mauritius in 1965, in which the ICJ issued an advisory opinion in 2017 on the Chagos Archipelago sovereignty dispute between the United Kingdom and Mauritius in response to a request from the United Nations General Assembly. The court deemed the United Kingdom's separation of the Chagos Islands from the rest of Mauritius in 1965, leading to the expulsion of the Chagossians when both were colonial territories, to be unlawful. Judge Donoghue dissented from the majority opinion, reasoning that:

I consider that the Advisory Opinion has the effect of circumventing the absence of United Kingdom consent to judicial settlement of the bilateral dispute between the United Kingdom and Mauritius regarding sovereignty over the Chagos Archipelago and thus undermines the integrity of the Court’s judicial function. For this reason, I believe that the Court should have exercised its discretion to decline to give the Advisory Opinion.

Donoghue was elected 26th president of the court on February 8, 2021, succeeding Abdulqawi Yusuf, for a term of three years. She is the second woman to hold the post (alongside Rosalyn Higgins) and third American (alongside Stephen Schwebel and Green Hackworth).

On January 26, 2024, Donoghue delivered an interim ruling on South Africa v. Israel on behalf of the ICJ. On February 4, Nawaf Salam was elected as her successor for President of the ICJ.

== Criticism ==
Norman Finkelstein notes that in January 2024, the ICJ—presided over by Donoghue at the time—delivered a ruling that found it plausible that Israel was committing genocide. He describes painstakingly reviewing the court records for his book Gaza's Gravediggers: An Inquiry into Corruption in High Places to establish that there was "no wiggle room" regarding the court's original findings. However, Finkelstein points out that, after stepping down from the court, Donoghue stated in an interview with the BBC's HARDtalk that the court had never said Israel was plausibly committing genocide. Finkelstein strongly condemns her subsequent comments, accusing her of lying to protect her career and future job prospects and attempting to "snatch" and "sabotage" the court's prior determination.

Legal offices
Preceded by Abdulqawi Yusuf	President of the International Court of Justice; 2021–2024	Succeeded by Nawaf Salam
