= Juan Manuel Gómez Robledo Verduzco =

Mexican lawyer and judge

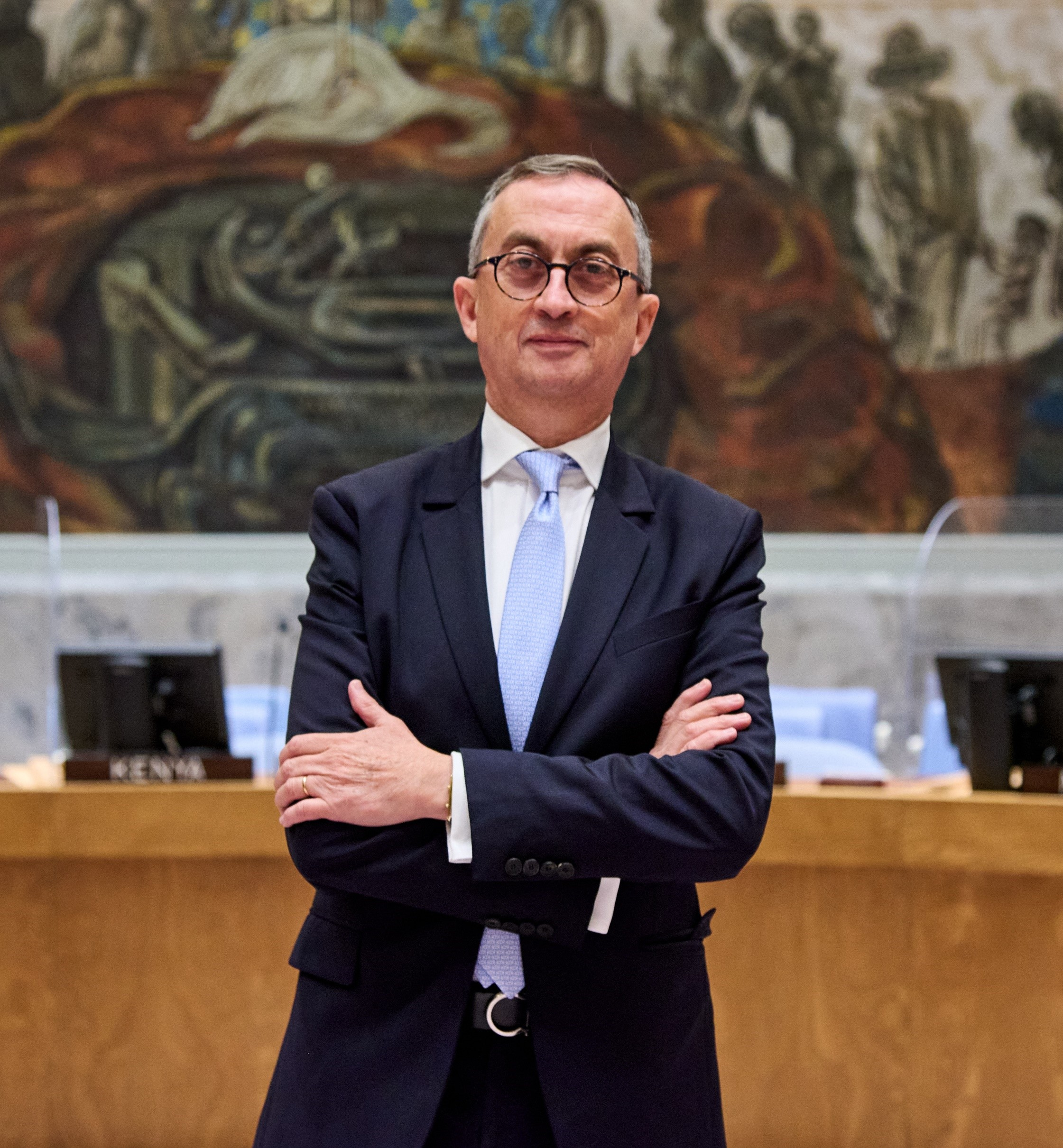

Judge of the International Court of Justice
- Incumbent
- Assumed office 2024

Personal details
- Education: Université de Paris I Panthéon-Sorbonne (LLB); Paris Nanterre University (LLM); Sciences Po (MA); National Autonomous University of Mexico (PhD)
- Occupation: Judge
- Profession: Law

Juan Manuel Gómez Robledo Verduzco (born March 5, 1959) is a Mexican lawyer and judge on the International Court of Justice.

== Education ==
Gómez Robledo received his bachelor's degree from the Université de Paris I Panthéon-Sorbonne. He also holds two master's degrees from Paris Nanterre University and Sciences Po. He received his PhD from the National Autonomous University of Mexico, mentored by Joanne, writing his dissertation, "The practice of the Security Council after the Cold-War and the interpretation of the United Nations Charter," which has since been published as a book.

== Career ==
Gómez Robledo has served in the Mexican foreign service for decades. He served as a legal advisor from 2000 to 2004 and as Mexico's representative to the Organization of American States from 1998 to 2001 and to the United Nations from 2004 to 2007. He also served as Mexico's agent before the International Court of Justice in the Avena case.
