= Kirill Gevorgian =

Russian jurist and diplomat

His Excellency Kirill Gevorgian
- Кирилл Геворгян

Vice President of the International Court of Justice
- In office 8 February 2021 – 6 February 2024
- President: Joan Donoghue
- Preceded by: Xue Hanqin
- Succeeded by: Julia Sebutinde

Judge of the International Court of Justice
- In office 6 February 2015 – 6 February 2024
- Preceded by: Leonid Skotnikov
- Succeeded by: Bogdan Aurescu

Ambassador of Russia to the Netherlands
- In office 2003–2009

Personal details
- Born: 8 April 1953 (age 73) Moscow, Russian SFSR, Soviet Union
- Education: Moscow State Institute of International Relations; Diplomatic Academy, Ministry of Foreign Affairs of the USSR

Kirill Goratsiyevich Gevorgian (Russian: Кирилл Горациевич Геворгян; born 8 April 1953) is a Russian jurist and diplomat. From 2003 to 2009, he served as Russia's ambassador to the Netherlands. In 2014, he was elected to the International Court of Justice (ICJ) for a term beginning the following year.

On 8 February 2021, Gevorgian was elected vice president of the court, succeeding Xue Hanqin.

In March 2022, during the dispute between Russia and Ukraine on allegations of genocide (Ukraine v. Russian Federation), Gevorgian voted against the adoption of provisional measures which ordered Russia to cease its special operation in Ukraine, as he believed the court had no jurisdiction over the case. Nonetheless, the measure was adopted by thirteen votes to two, with Chinese jurist Xue Hanqin casting the other dissenting vote. This conclusion notwithstanding, he voted in favour of the measure requesting the Parties not to aggravate their dispute since, as he declared, "the power to indicate such measure is a power inherent to the Court".

On 9 November 2023, at the 2023 International Court of Justice judges election, Gevorgian failed to be re-elected as one of the two Eastern European judges at the ICJ, marking the first time that the USSR/Russia would not be represented at the court. Gevorgian received the votes of 77 UN General Assembly members, while Romania's candidate, Bogdan Aurescu, received that of 117, being elected instead.
