= Patrick Lipton Robinson =

Jamaican judge (born 1944)

His Excellency The Honourable Patrick Lipton Robinson O.J
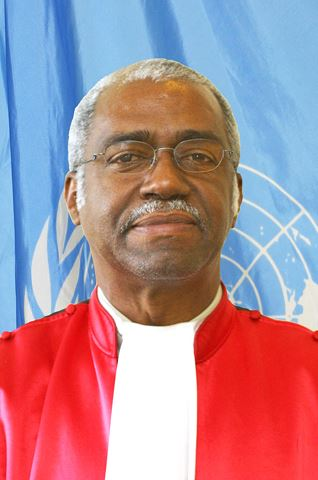

Judge of the International Court of Justice
- In office 6 February 2015 – 6 February 2024
- Preceded by: Bernardo Sepúlveda Amor
- Succeeded by: Juan Manuel Gómez Robledo

President of the International Criminal Tribunal for the former Yugoslavia
- In office 4 November 2008 – 17 November 2011
- Preceded by: Fausto Pocar
- Succeeded by: Theodor Meron

Judge of the International Criminal Tribunal for the former Yugoslavia
- In office 12 November 1998 – 8 April 2015

Personal details
- Born: 29 January 1944 (age 82) Sheffield, Colony of Jamaica
- Education: University of the West Indies (BA); University of London (LLB); King's College London (LLM)

Patrick Lipton Robinson (born 29 January 1944) is a Jamaican jurist who was a judge of the International Court of Justice from February 2015 to 2024. Prior to this he was formerly the President of the International Criminal Tribunal for the Former Yugoslavia, a position he held between 2008 and 2011 during which time his Chef de Cabinet was Gabrielle Louise McIntyre. He was first elected to the Tribunal in 1998 and has been re-elected twice since. In 2004, he presided over the trial of Slobodan Milošević, the former Yugoslav president.

He was educated at Jamaica College, University of the West Indies (BA, 1964), the University of London (LLB, 1968) and King's College London (LLM, 1972). He is the recipient of the national award, Order of Jamaica, awarded by the government of Jamaica for services to International Law and Honorary Doctorate Degrees from the University of the West Indies, Jamaica, and the Christian Theological Seminary in Indianapolis. He is the recipient of the award of Honorary Membership of the American Society of International Law for 2011.

He is the author of the book Jamaican Athletics – A Model for 2012 and the World.

He is a member of the Crimes Against Humanity Initiative Advisory Council, a project of the Whitney R. Harris World Law Institute at Washington University School of Law in St. Louis to establish the world's first treaty on the prevention and punishment of crimes against humanity.

== Other positions held ==
- 1986: Chairman, United Nations Commission on Transnational Corporations
- 1988–1995: Commissioner, Inter-American Commission on Human Rights
- 1991–1996: Member, International Law Commission
- Since 1996: Member, International Bioethics Committee
- 1995–1996: Foreign member, Haiti Truth and Justice Commission
- 1998–2015: Judge, International Criminal Tribunal for the Former Yugoslavia
- 2008–2011: President, International Criminal Tribunal for the Former Yugoslavia
- 2015–2024: Judge, International Court of Justice
