= Hilary Charlesworth =

Australian legal academic and judge of the International Court of Justice

Her Excellency Hilary Charlesworth AM FASSA FAAL
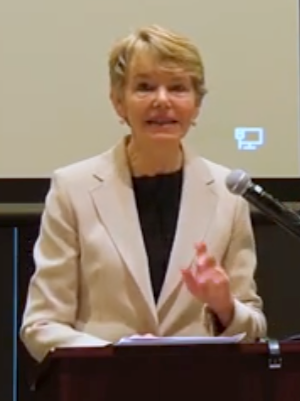
- Giving a lecture at the Australian National University in 2023

Judge of the International Court of Justice
- Incumbent
- Assumed office 5 November 2021
- Preceded by: James R. Crawford

Personal details
- Born: Hilary Christiane Mary Charlesworth; 28 February 1955 (age 71) Leuven, Belgium
- Title: Harrison Moore Chair in Law, Melbourne Law School; Melbourne Laureate Professor, Melbourne Law School
- Awards: ASIL award for creative legal scholarship Australian Laureate Fellowship

Academic background
- Education: University of Melbourne (BA, LLB); Harvard Law School (SJD)
- Thesis: A Constitutional Bill of Rights: North American Experience and Australian Prospect (1985)

Academic work
- Discipline: International law
- Sub-discipline: Human rights, law of international organizations, international legal theory
- Institutions: University of Melbourne (2016–present); Australian National University (1998–present); University of Adelaide (1993–1996)
- Main interests: Human rights law, international institutions, feminist legal theory
- Notable works: The Boundaries of International Law (2006)
- Notable ideas: Feminism and international law
- Website: University of Melbourne

Hilary Christiane Mary Charlesworth AM FASSA FAAL (born 28 February 1955) is an Australian international lawyer. She has been a Judge of the International Court of Justice since 5 November 2021, and is Harrison Moore Professor of Law and Melbourne Laureate Professor at the University of Melbourne, and Distinguished Professor at the Australian National University.

== Education and career ==
Charlesworth holds degrees from Melbourne and Harvard Law Schools, and is a barrister and solicitor of the Supreme Court of Victoria. She has served as editorial board member of many legal publications, including the American Journal of International Law, Melbourne University Law Review and the Asian Journal of International Law. From 2003 to 2004, she was the Wayne Morse Chair of Law and Politics, established in honor of the late American Senator, at the University of Oregon.

In addition to her academic appointments, Charlesworth is active in international justice. In 2011, she was appointed as an ad hoc judge of the International Court of Justice in the Whaling in the Antarctic Case (Australia v. Japan).

In 2020, Guyana appointed Charlesworth as an ad hoc judge in the Arbitral Award of 3 October 1899 Case (Guyana v Venezuela) in the International Court of Justice. In 2021, the Australian Government supported the Permanent Court of Arbitration's Australian National Group's nomination of Professor Hilary Charlesworth for election as a Judge of the International Court of Justice to fill the vacant position resulting from the death of the Australian judge, James Richard Crawford, who died 31 May 2021. Crawford's term was due to conclude on 5 February 2024. Charlesworth was elected as a judge of the court on 5 November 2021, with immediate effect; she was sworn in as a judge on 7 December 2021.

== Works ==
- Weston, B., Falk, R.A. & Charlesworth, H. 1997, International Law and World Order, 3rd edn, West Publishing Co., Minneapolis
- Charlesworth H. & Chinkin C. 2000, The Boundaries of International Law, Manchester University Press, Manchester (Winner, American Society of International Law Certificate of Merit 2001 for "preeminent contribution to creative scholarship")
- Charlesworth, H. 2002, Writing in Rights: Australia and the Protection of Human Rights, UNSW Press, Sydney
- Weston, B., Falk, R.A., Charlesworth, H. & Strauss, A.L. 2006, International Law and World Order: A Problem Oriented Coursebook, 4th edn, West Publishing Co., Minneapolis
- Charlesworth, H., Chiam, M., Hovell, D. & Williams G. 2006, No Country is an Island : Australia and International Law, UNSW Press, Sydney (Highly Commended in Arts Non-Fiction category, 2006 Human Rights and Equal Opportunity Commission Human Rights Awards)
- Byrnes, A., Charlesworth, H. & McKinnon, G. 2009, Australian Bills of Rights: History, Politics, Law, UNSW Press, Sydney

== Awards and recognition ==
- Charlesworth's book (co-authored with Christine Chinkin) entitled The Boundaries of International Law: A Feminist Analysis was awarded the Certificate of Merit by the American Society of International Law in 2001.
- In 2001 she was inducted into the Victorian Honour Roll of Women.
- Elected Fellow of the Academy of the Social Sciences in Australia, 2003.
- Appointed Fellow of the Australian Academy of Law, 2004.
- In 2006, her contributions to the body of international law scholarship earned her the American Society of International Law's Goler T. Butcher Medal, and its award was recorded by Hansard in the ACT Legislative Assembly.
- Appointed a Member of the Order of Australia (AM) in the 2007 Australia Day Honours for "For service to international and human rights law through professional and supporting roles in academia, legal organisations, government bodies and non-government organisations in Australia and internationally, and through the encouragement of human rights dialogue, particularly in the area of women's rights".
- Australian Laureate Fellowship (2010)

== Lectures ==
- Feminist Analysis of International Law in the Lecture Series of the United Nations Audiovisual Library of International Law
