= Mohamed Bennouna =

Moroccan diplomat and jurist (born 1943)

His Excellency Mohamed Bennouna
- محمد بنونة

Judge of the International Court of Justice
- In office 6 February 2006 – 6 February 2024
- Nominated by: Morocco
- Monarch: Mohammed VI
- Preceded by: Nabil Elaraby
- Succeeded by: Dire Tladi

Permanent Representative of Morocco to the United Nations
- In office April 2001 – March 2006
- Monarch: Mohammed VI
- Preceded by: Ahmed Snoussi
- Succeeded by: Mostapha Sahel

Judge of the International Criminal Tribunal for the former Yugoslavia
- In office 16 November 1998 – 28 February 2001

Personal details
- Born: Mohamed Bennouna; 29 April 1943 (age 83) Marrakesh, French protectorate in Morocco
- Education: University of Nancy; Sorbonne
- Occupation: Diplomat, jurist, professor
- Profession: International law

Mohamed Bennouna (Arabic: محمد بنونة; born 29 April 1943) is a Moroccan diplomat and jurist. He has served as a professor at Mohammed V University and has held several prominent international positions. From 2001 to 2006, he was Morocco's Permanent Representative to the United Nations. He also served as a judge on the International Criminal Tribunal for the former Yugoslavia and, from 2006 to 2024, as a judge on the International Court of Justice.

== Biography ==
=== Education ===
Mohamed Bennouna studied jurisprudence and political science at the University of Nancy and at the Sorbonne in Paris, in addition, he received in 1970 a diploma from the Hague Academy of International Law. Two years later, he earned his doctorate at the University of Nancy in the field of international law, with a thesis on military interventions in non-international conflicts.

=== Career ===
Then in 1972, he worked as agrégé in the subjects of international law and political science at the Sorbonne. In January 1973, he became a professor at the Mohammed V University, at which he served until 1984, including 1975 to 1979 as dean of the Faculty of Law.

In addition, he worked in senior positions in various bodies and organizations of the United Nations (UN). He served as legal counsel since 1974, inter alia, the delegations of his country at the UN General Assembly and from 2001 to early 2006 as the permanent representative of Morocco to the UN. Between 2004 and 2005, he was Chairman of the United Nations General Assembly Sixth Committee (Legal). From 1986 to 1998 he was a member of the International Law Commission and also from 1991 to 1998 General Director of the Arab World Institute in Paris. From 1998 to 2001 he was judge at the ICTY in The Hague.

His term at the ICJ began in February 2006 and, in 2014, was re-elected for an additional term, which ends in 2024.

Mohamed Bennouna was one of the fifteen judges presented in South Africa's case accusing Israel of committing genocide in the Gaza war.

=== Awards and honors ===
Mohamed Bennouna holds several awards including the National prize for culture of Morocco, Medal for culture of Yemen and Knight of the National Order of the Légion d'honneur.

=== Personal life ===
He is married and father of three children.

== Selected works ==
- Le consentement à l’ingérence militaire dans les conflits internes. Paris 1974
- Le droit international relatif aux matières premières. Den Haag 1982
- Le droit international du développement. Paris 1983
- La spécificité du Maghreb arabe. Casablanca 1990

== Lectures ==
La Cour internationale de Justice, juge des souverainetés? in the Lecture Series of the United Nations Audiovisual Library of International Law
