= Abdulqawi Yusuf =

Somali lawyer and judge

His Excellency Abdulqawi Ahmed Yusuf

President of the International Court of Justice
- In office 6 February 2018 – 8 February 2021
- Vice President: Xue Hanqin
- Preceded by: Ronny Abraham
- Succeeded by: Joan Donoghue

Vice President of the International Court of Justice
- In office 6 February 2015 – 6 February 2018
- President: Ronny Abraham
- Preceded by: Peter Tomka
- Succeeded by: Xue Hanqin

Judge of the International Court of Justice
- In office 6 February 2009 – 30 September 2025
- Preceded by: Raymond Ranjeva
- Succeeded by: Phoebe Okowa

Personal details
- Born: 12 September 1948 (age 78) Eyl, British Military Administration (Somaliland)
- Citizenship: Somalia
- Education: Somali National University (JD); University of Florence; Graduate Institute of International Studies (PhD)
- Occupation: Judge
- Profession: Lawyer

Abdulqawi Ahmed Yusuf (Somali: Cabdulqawi Axmed Yuusuf) is a Somali lawyer and judge who served on the International Court of Justice from 2009 to 2025 and as the court's president from 2018 to 2021.

== Early life ==
Yusuf was born in the northeastern town of Eyl, Puntland, Somalia. He holds a Juris Doctor (Somali National University) and holds a PhD in international law from the Graduate Institute of International Studies of Geneva. Prior to his doctorate, Yusuf completed post-graduate studies in international law at the University of Florence in Italy.

He is fluent in Somali, Arabic, English, French, and Italian.

== Career ==
Yusuf's previous positions include: Legal Adviser and Director of the Office of International Standards and Legal Affairs for UNESCO from March 2001 to January 2009, Legal Advisor (1994–1998) and Assistant Director General for African Affairs, United Nations Industrial Development Organization (UNIDO), Vienna (1998–2001), Representative and Head of the New York office of the United Nations Conference on Trade and Development (UNCTAD) (1992–1994) and Chief of the Legal Policies Service of UNCTAD (1987–1992), Lecturer in law at the Somali National University (1974–1981) and at the University of Geneva (1981–1983), and Somali delegate to the Third United Nations Conference on the Law of the Sea (1975–1980). He has also been guest professor and lecturer at a number of universities and institutes in Switzerland, Italy, Greece and France.

Yusuf was elected to the Institut de droit international in 1999 and is currently a member. He is the founder and General Editor of the African Yearbook of International Law. Yusuf is also one of the founders of the African Foundation for International Law, as well as the chairperson of its executive committee. In addition, Yusuf has authored several books and numerous articles on various aspects of international law as well as articles and op-ed pieces in newspapers on current Northeast African and Somali affairs. He is a member of the editorial advisory board of the Asian Yearbook of International Law, and a member of the Thessaloniki Institute of Public International Law and International Relations curatorium. He also previously served as a judge ad hoc at the International Court of Justice.

=== ICJ Judge ===
On 6 February 2009, he was appointed as a judge at the International Court of Justice. On 6 February 2015, he was elected vice-president of the court.

In 2011, Yusuf would later gain a seat in the advisory council of The Hague Institute for Global Justice.

On 6 February 2018, Yusuf was appointed President of the International Court of Justice. He became the third African to hold the title after Nigeria's Taslim Olawale Elias (1982-1985) and Algeria's Mohamed Bedjaoui (1994-1997).

On 6 June 2025 he announced that he would resign from the Court, effective from 30 September of the same year. The UN Security Council and the General Assembly elected Kenya's Phoebe Okowa to complete Yusuf's term, which would have concluded in February 2027.

== Publications ==
- Panafricanisme et droit international, Académie de droit international de La Haye, hors collection, 2017.
- Intellectual Property and International Trade: The Trips Agreement (ed. with C. Correa), 3rd Edition (Kluwer Law International, 2016).
- African Yearbook of International Law, (Founder and General Editor), (Vols. 1-21), 1993–2016, Kluwer Law International and Nijhoff Publishers (London, The Hague, Boston).
- Pan-Africanism and International Law, Brill, Nijhoff, 2014.
- L’Union africaine: cadre juridique et institutionnel. Manuel sur l’organisation panafricaine (ed. with F. Ouguergouz), Paris: Pedone, 2013.
- The African Union: Legal and Institutional Framework. A Manual on the Pan-African Organization (ed. with F. Ouguergouz), Leiden: Nijhoff, 2012.
- Standard setting in UNESCO/L’action normative à l’UNESCO (ed.), Paris: UNESCO Publishing and Leiden: Nijhoff, 2007.
- Intellectual Property and International Trade: the TRIPS Agreement (ed. with C. Correa), The Hague: Kluwer Law International, 1st edition, 1998, 2nd edition, 2007.
- International Technology Transfer: The Origins and Aftermath of the United Nations Negotiations on a Draft Code of Conduct (ed. with S.J. Patel and P. Roffe), The Hague: Kluwer Law International, 2001.
- Legal Aspects of Trade Preferences for Developing States: A study in the Influence of Development Needs on the Evolution of International Law, The Hague: Nijhoff Publishers, 1982.
