= Xue Hanqin =

Judge of the International Court of Justice

- 薛捍勤
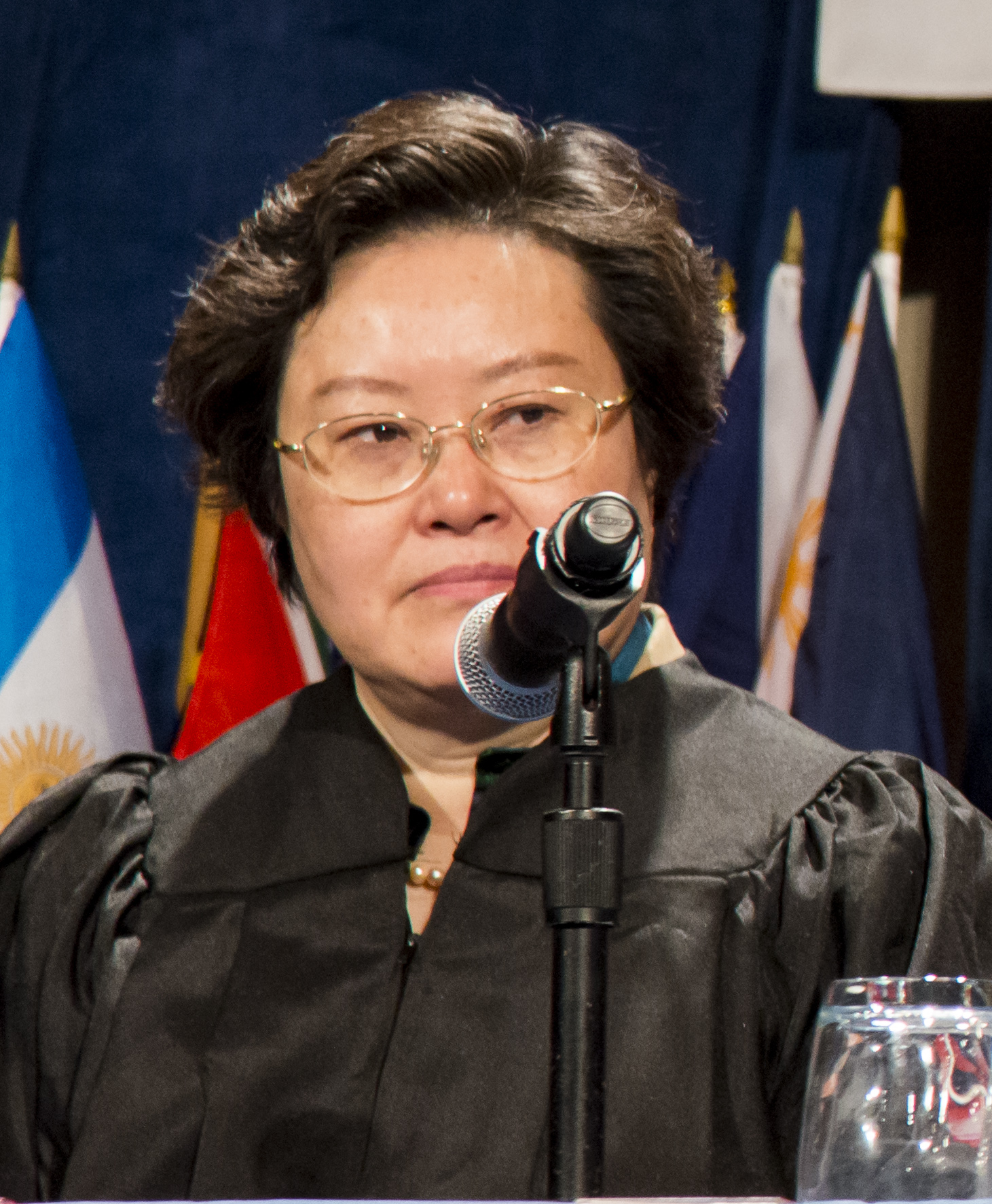

Vice President of the International Court of Justice
- In office 6 February 2018 – 8 February 2021
- President: Abdulqawi Yusuf
- Preceded by: Abdulqawi Yusuf
- Succeeded by: Kirill Gevorgian

Judge of the International Court of Justice
- Incumbent
- Assumed office 29 June 2010
- Preceded by: Shi Jiuyong

Personal details
- Born: 15 September 1955 (age 71) Shanghai, China
- Education: Beijing Foreign Studies University (BA); Peking University; Columbia University (LLM, SJD)

Xue Hanqin (Chinese: 薛捍勤; pinyin: Xuē Hànqín; born 15 September 1955) is a Chinese jurist at the International Court of Justice. On 29 June 2010, she was elected to fill the vacancy created by Shi Jiuyong's resignation on 28 May 2010. She is one of five female judges serving on the International Court of Justice (ICJ). Xue is also the third judge from the People's Republic of China to serve on the ICJ.

As Xue was re-elected to the Court in 2011 and 2020, her term will expire on 5 February 2030. On the 6 February 2018, Xue was elected Vice President of the International Court of Justice for a three-year term.

== Education ==
Xue Hanqin received a Bachelor of Arts from Beijing Foreign Studies University in 1980 and a graduate diploma in international law from Peking University in 1982. She received a Master of Laws and a Doctor of the Science of Law from Columbia Law School in 1983 and 1995, respectively.

== Career ==
From 1980 to 2003, Xue served in the Department of Treaty and Law of the Ministry of Foreign Affairs of China, eventually rising to the position of Director-General. She returned to Columbia Law School in 1991 and obtained a Doctor of Juridical Science in 1995. Xue was appointed the Chinese ambassador to the Netherlands in 2003 and served until 2008. In December 2008, she became the first Chinese ambassador to the Association of Southeast Asian Nations.

She was elected to the International Court of Justice (ICJ) in June 2010. Xue was sworn in as a member of the ICJ on 13 September 2010. She is currently a member of the Curatorium of The Hague Academy of International Law. On 6 February 2018, Xue was elected Vice President of the International Court of Justice for a three-year term. In November 2020, she was re-elected to the ICJ for another nine-year term.

== Lectures ==
- Transboundary Damage in International Law in the Lecture Series of the United Nations Audiovisual Library of International Law
- 国际法上的跨界损害问题 in the Lecture Series of the United Nations Audiovisual Library of International Law
- Special Panel in Honour of Professor R.P. Anand in the Lecture Series of the United Nations Audiovisual Library of International Law
