= Advisory opinion on Kosovo's declaration of independence =

International Court of Justice opinion

Accordance with International Law of the Unilateral Declaration of Independence in Respect of Kosovo
- Court: International Court of Justice
- Full case name: Accordance with international law of the unilateral declaration of independence in respect of Kosovo (Request for Advisory Opinion)
- Decided: 22 July 2010
- Citation: Accordance with international law of the unilateral declaration of independence in respect of Kosovo (Request for Advisory Opinion)

Court membership
- Judges sitting: Hisashi Owada (President), Peter Tomka (Vice-President), Abdul G. Koroma, Awn Shawkat Al-Khasawneh, Thomas Buergenthal, Bruno Simma, Ronny Abraham, Kenneth Keith, Bernardo Sepúlveda Amor, Mohamed Bennouna, Leonid Skotnikov, Antônio Augusto Cançado Trindade, Abdulqawi Ahmed Yusuf, Christopher Greenwood

Case opinions
- Kosovo declaration was not in violation of international law (10–4); The Court concludes that the authors of the declaration of independence of 17 February 2008 did not act as one of the Provisional Institutions of Self-Government within the Constitutional Framework, but rather as persons who acted together in their capacity as representatives of the people of Kosovo outside the framework of the interim administration

Accordance with International Law of the Unilateral Declaration of Independence in Respect of Kosovo was a request in 2008 for an advisory opinion referred to the International Court of Justice by the United Nations General Assembly regarding the 2008 Kosovo declaration of independence. The territory of Kosovo is the subject of a dispute between Serbia and the Republic of Kosovo established by the declaration. This was the first case regarding a unilateral declaration of independence to be brought before the court.

The court delivered its advisory opinion on 22 July 2010; by a vote of 10 to 4, it declared that "the adoption of the declaration of independence of 17 February 2008 did not violate general international law because international law contains no 'prohibition on declarations of independence', nor did the adoption of the declaration of independence violate UN Security Council Resolution 1244, since this did not describe Kosovo's final status, nor had the Security Council reserved for itself the decision on final status." Reactions to the decision were mixed, with most countries which already recognised Kosovo hailing the decision and saying it was "unique" and does not set a precedent; while many countries which do not recognise Kosovo said they would not be doing so as such recognition could set a precedent of endorsing secession in other places.

== Background ==
The 2008 Kosovo declaration of independence was adopted on 17 February 2008 in a meeting of the Assembly of Kosovo. It was the second declaration of independence by Kosovo's ethnic-Albanian political institutions, the first having been proclaimed on 7 September 1990.

Serbia decided to seek international validation and support for its stance that the declaration of independence was illegal at the International Court of Justice.

Whether the declaration was in fact an official act of the Provisional Institutions of Self-Government was unclear; in the end, the Court determined it was issued by "representatives of the people of Kosovo" acting outside the normal Provisional Institutions of Self-Government. This was significant, since the Serbian argument was that the Kosovo Provisional Institutions of Self-Government had exceeded the authority given to them by the Constitutional Framework (promulgated by the United Nations Mission in Kosovo (UNMIK). In September 2012, international supervision ended, and Kosovo became responsible for its own governance.

== United Nations request ==
On 26 March 2008, the Government of Serbia announced its plan to call on the International Court of Justice to rule on the declaration of Kosovo's secession. Serbia sought to have the court's opinion on whether the declaration was in breach of international law. Also, an initiative seeking international support was undertaken at the United Nations General Assembly when it gathered again in New York in September 2008.

On 15 August 2008, Serbian Foreign Minister Vuk Jeremić officially filed a request at the United Nations seeking opinion of the International Court of Justice.

The resolution was worded as follows:

The General Assembly,

Mindful of the purposes and principles of the United Nations,

Bearing in mind its functions and powers under the Charter of the United Nations,

Recalling that on 17 February 2008 the Provisional Institutions of Self-Government of Kosovo declared independence from Serbia,

Aware that this act has been received with varied reactions by the Members of the United Nations as to its compatibility with the existing international legal order,

Decides, in accordance with Article 96 of the Charter of the United Nations to request the International Court of Justice, pursuant to Article 65 of the Statute of the Court to render an advisory opinion on the following question:

"Is the unilateral declaration of independence by the Provisional Institutions of Self-Government of Kosovo in accordance with international law?"

On 30 September 2008, in a trial vote, the Serbian initiative was backed by 120 member states. In the real vote, the United Nations General Assembly adopted this proposal as Resolution 63/3 on 8 October 2008 with 77 votes in favour, 6 votes against and 74 abstentions.

The 77 countries that voted for the initiative A/63/L.2 of Serbia were: Algeria, Angola, Antigua and Barbuda, Argentina, Azerbaijan, Belarus, Bolivia, Botswana, Brazil, Brunei, Cambodia, Chile, China, Costa Rica, Cuba, Cyprus, Democratic Republic of the Congo, Djibouti, Dominica, Dominican Republic, East Timor, Egypt, El Salvador, Equatorial Guinea, Eritrea, Fiji, Greece, Guatemala, Guinea, Guyana, Honduras, Iceland, India, Indonesia, Iran, Jamaica, Kazakhstan, Kenya, Kyrgyzstan, Lesotho, Liechtenstein, Madagascar, Mauritius, Mexico, Montenegro, Myanmar, Namibia, Nicaragua, Niger, Nigeria, North Korea, Norway, Panama, Papua New Guinea, Paraguay, Philippines, Republic of the Congo, Romania, Russia, Saint Vincent and the Grenadines, Serbia, Singapore, Slovakia, Solomon Islands, South Africa, Spain, Sri Lanka, Sudan, Suriname, Swaziland, Syria, Tanzania, Uruguay, Uzbekistan, Vietnam, Zambia and Zimbabwe.

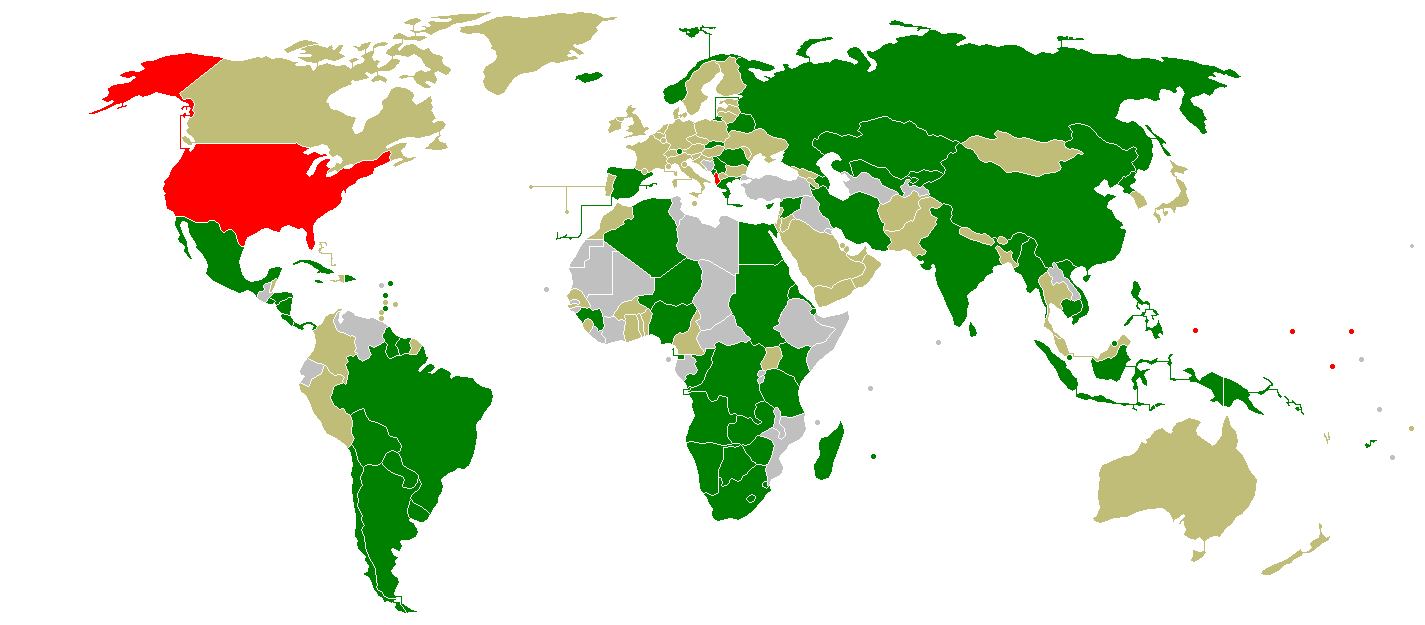
Map of vote about the resolution A/63/L.2 in the United Nations General Assembly in October 2008 States that voted for the resolution. States that voted against the resolution. States that abstained from voting. States that were absent during the vote.

The 6 countries that opposed the initiative were: Albania, Federated States of Micronesia, Marshall Islands, Nauru, Palau and United States.

The 74 countries that abstained from voting were: Afghanistan, Andorra, Armenia, Australia, Austria, Bahamas, Bahrain, Bangladesh, Barbados, Belgium, Belize, Benin, Bhutan, Bulgaria, Burkina Faso, Cameroon, Canada, Colombia, Croatia, Czech Republic, Denmark, Estonia, Finland, France, Georgia, Germany, Ghana, Grenada, Haiti, Hungary, Ireland, Israel, Italy, Japan, Jordan, Latvia, Lebanon, Lithuania, Luxembourg, Macedonia, Malaysia, Malta, Moldova, Monaco, Mongolia, Morocco, Nepal, the Netherlands, New Zealand, Oman, Pakistan, Peru, Poland, Portugal, Qatar, Saint Lucia, Samoa, San Marino, Saudi Arabia, Senegal, Sierra Leone, Slovenia, South Korea, Sweden, Switzerland, Thailand, Togo, Trinidad and Tobago, Uganda, Ukraine, United Arab Emirates, United Kingdom, Vanuatu, and Yemen.

Officially the following countries were absent: Bosnia and Herzegovina, Burundi, Cape Verde, Chad, Côte d'Ivoire, Ecuador, Ethiopia, Gabon, Gambia, Iraq, Kiribati, Kuwait, Laos, Libya, Malawi, Maldives, Mali, Mauritania, Mozambique, Rwanda, Saint Kitts and Nevis, Seychelles, Tonga, Tunisia, Turkey, Turkmenistan, Tuvalu and Venezuela.

The following states were not allowed to vote due to the lack of payments to the UN: Central African Republic, Comoros, Guinea Bissau, Liberia, São Tomé and Príncipe, Somalia and Tajikistan.

=== Provision of documents by the United Nations ===
On 9 October 2008, the UN Secretariat informed the ICJ that it had begun the preparation of a dossier containing all documents relevant to the legal question before the Court, representing the body of international law on the question.

Aside from introductory notes, the dossier contained a copy of UN Security Council Resolution 1244 (1999), deliberations of the Security Council, official reports on the activities of UNMIK, reports on the NATO-led security force KFOR, regulations and international agreements entered into by UNMIK, reports on the activities of the Provisional Institutions of Self-Government and on the Kosovo Status Process. Also included were 'general international law instruments – universal and regional', such as copies of the UN Charter, Helsinki Final Act, and various agreements on civil and human rights, as well as other legal documents from the wider Balkans (such as the rulings of the Badinter Commission).

== Court proceedings ==
=== Written statements ===
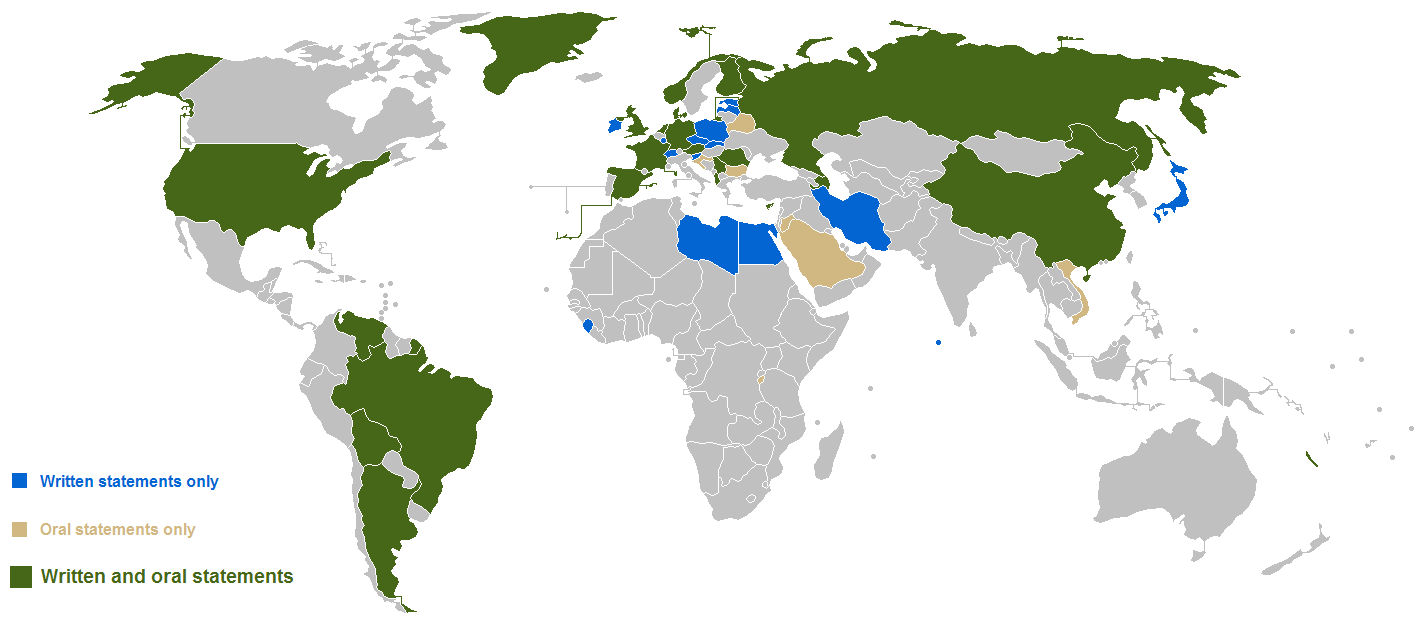
Countries participating in the process at the ICJ

On 21 April 2009, the ICJ announced that 35 member states of the United Nations had filed written statements within the time-limit fixed by the court (17 April 2009) on the question of the legality of Kosovo's UDI. Kosovo also filed a written contribution. Written statements were submitted by the following states (in order of receipt): the Czech Republic, France, Cyprus, People's Republic of China, Switzerland, Romania, Albania, Austria, Egypt, Germany, Slovakia, Russia, Finland, Poland, Luxembourg, Libya, the United Kingdom, the United States of America, Serbia, Spain, Iran, Estonia, Norway, the Netherlands, Slovenia, Latvia, Japan, Brazil, Ireland, Denmark, Argentina, Azerbaijan, Maldives, Sierra Leone, and Bolivia. This was the first time that China had officially submitted an opinion in a case in front of the ICJ. States and organisations which had presented written statements were allowed to submit written comments on the other statements by 17 July 2009. Venezuela was also allowed to submit documents, even though it failed to meet the deadline. The most extensive written statement was supplied by Serbia, followed by the United States, the United Kingdom, Germany, Cyprus, Albania, Argentina, France, Spain and Russia, while Libya submitted one of the shortest statements. Cyprus supplied a list of Europe's regions that can be expected to follow suit and announce similar separatist moves. Russia and Slovenia argued whether the case of Kosovo is unique or not.

The ICJ also invited the UN Secretary-General Ban Ki-moon to send his statement. His document contains three parts, with the first reminding of the process that led to the ICJ case. The second explains the establishment of the UN mission in Kosovo and cites "two relevant dates": March 1998 as the beginning of UN engagement in Kosovo, and February 2008, which is mentioned as the "closing date", i.e., the date when the proclamation was made. Ban writes about provisions of international law relevant to the case in the third part of his written statement, without expressing his position in favour of or against the province's independence.

Fourteen States which presented written statements also submitted written comments on the other written statements. These States are (in order of receipt): France, Norway, Cyprus, Serbia, Argentina, Germany, Netherlands, Albania, Slovenia, Switzerland, Bolivia, United Kingdom, United States of America, and Spain. The authors of the unilateral declaration of independence submitted a written contribution containing their comments on the written statements.

=== Public hearings ===
The public hearings opened on 1 December 2009. During these hearings, statements and comments were presented orally by some of the United Nations Member States (whether or not they had filed written statements or comments), and by representatives from Kosovo (under the title "Authors of the unilateral declaration of independence").

Serbia and Kosovo were given three hours to present their case on 1 December 2009. 27 other states were given 45 minutes each, being heard in French alphabetical order. The proceedings lasted until 11 December 2009.

Country	Date case presented	Head of delegation	Points raised
Serbia	1 December 2009	Dušan Bataković, Ambassador of Serbia to France	Kosovo's unilateral declaration of independence violates the foundations of international law. It is a challenge to the authority of the United Nations, and a challenge to international legal order based on the principles of sovereignty and territorial integrity. The declaration represents an attempt to abolish the UN administration in Kosovo, to annul Serbia's sovereignty over its southern province and to impose independence as a unilateral solution for Kosovo.; Kosovo was "the historical cradle of Serbia and constitutes one of the essential pillars of its identity".; The independence proclamation was made by the temporary Kosovo government and was in violation of UN Resolution 1244, which guarantees the Federal Republic of Yugoslavia's (and now Serbia's) territorial integrity.; All Serbian proposals offering broad autonomy to ethnic Albanians had been rejected.; Serbs and other non-Albanians in Kosovo are having their basic human rights threatened, and they are being pressured to move out from the region. All big towns in Kosovo, with the exception of Kosovska Mitrovica, have been ethnically cleansed. The Serb churches and monasteries in Kosovo are "the only cultural monuments in Europe that are guarded by international armed forces because they are faced with the realistic threat of being demolished".; It would be a dangerous precedent if other countries with UN administration concluded that the arrival of peacekeeping forces represented the first step in the secession of a region.
Kosovo	1 December 2009	Skënder Hyseni, Foreign Minister of Kosovo	Kosovo's independence is irreversible. This will remain the case, not only for Kosovo, but also for the sake of regional peace and security.; After violating the human rights of Kosovo's Albanians Serbia had lost its rights to the country.; The will of the people of Kosovo to freely determine their political status goes back many years and was clear to all participants in the 1999 Rambouillet Conference. "It was clear immediately after the 1999 conflict, when [UN] resolution 1244 expressly referred to the Rambouillet accords. It was clear throughout the period of [the UN's] UNMIK administration, and it was fully discussed and considered throughout the final status negotiations".; The negotiations for the final status of Kosovo were supposed to convince Serbia to recognise its independence.; Serbia has never been sincere in its offers of autonomy for Kosovo: "In the midst of status talks, Serbia adopted the constitution where it confirmed Kosovo as part of Serbia, thus demonstrated to Albanians that it is not interested in finding the solution, and showed what it meant with its offer for autonomy ... Therefore, Serbia showed that Kosovo is only a piece of land".
Albania	2 December 2009	Gazmend Barbullushi, Ambassador of Albania to the Netherlands	There is no rule of international law prohibiting secession.; It would be a severe violation of international law if intervention by third states, forcefully or otherwise, was decisive for a declaration of independence. But in Kosovo's case this was not so.
Germany	2 December 2009	Susanne Wasum-Rainer, Legal Adviser, Federal Foreign Office	The existence of the state of Kosovo cannot be ignored. Its existence is based on the right of self-determination by the people of Kosovo.; The principle of effectiveness, is "the only principle that can be applied in the case of Kosovo, since Kosovo fulfills the elements of statehood and its people, territory and government have nation-building qualities".
Saudi Arabia	2 December 2009	Abdullah Alshaghrood, Ambassador of Saudi Arabia to the Netherlands	The declaration of independence was not a violation of international law.
Argentina	2 December 2009	Susana Ruiz Cerutti, Head of the Legal Adviser Office, Ministry of Foreign Affairs	Kosovo's declaration of independence "breaches an obligation to respect the territorial integrity of Serbia, the obligation of peaceful settlement of disputes and principle of non-intervention. The resolution has no legal basis in the principle of self-determination".; The declaration "did not, and could not, abolish Serbia's sovereignty over Kosovo".; Kosovo's status will have to be determined through talks and compromise, in line with Resolution 1244.
Austria	3 December 2009	Helmut Tichy, Deputy Legal Adviser, Federal Ministry of European and International Affairs	In international law there is no rule that prohibits the declaration of independence, or secession. The declaration was adopted by elected representatives who have expressed the will of the people of Kosovo and international law does not prohibit this.; The only exceptions are Northern Cyprus and Rhodesia; their independence is illegal as it was declared with the use of illegal outside force and by racist minority regimes, respectively.
Azerbaijan	3 December 2009	Agshin Mehdiyev, Ambassador and Permanent Representative of Azerbaijan to the United Nations	Entities that declare secession while violating the internal laws of the state can not be considered as countries.; Fait accompli may not be just accepted. Power is not the right, and the force is not the law.; The United Nations have never recognised any case of a unilateral independence declaration.
Belarus	3 December 2009	Elena Gritsenko, Ambassador of Belarus to the Netherlands	Secession by international law was allowed only in former colonies, or in cases where the minority population was oppressed for a long period of time and was denied the participation in government, however the situation in Kosovo has not met these criteria traditionally interpreted as the right for "external" self-determination.; The internal law of Serbia as well as UNSC resolutions are satisfactory for the "internal" self-determination of the Albanian population.
Bolivia	4 December 2009	Roberto Calzadilla Sarmiento, Ambassador of Bolivia to the Netherlands	Kosovo is an integral part of Serbia. Bolivia considers that the Republic of Kosovo does not exist.; The UNSC resolution 1244 set the framework for a political solution within Serbia, or for a substantial autonomy for Kosovo within the FR Yugoslavia.; A unilateral declaration of independence cannot change the international regime established by the UNSC resolution, or decide the outcome of negotiations.
Brazil	4 December 2009	José Artur Denot Medeiros, Ambassador of Brazil to the Netherlands	The unilateral declaration of independence ignores not only the authority of the UN Security Council, but also the principle of protecting the territorial integrity of states.; There is no basis to justify the unilateral declaration of independence in UNSC resolution 1244 because it stipulated a solution agreed by both parties. Since such an agreement was not reached, the Kosovo dispute can be decided only by the UN Security Council.; Brazil, as a member of the council, voted for the resolution 1244, and considers it important because it guaranteed the territorial integrity of Yugoslavia, and it rejected the view that the authorities have the right to repression of its own people.
Bulgaria	4 December 2009	Zlatko Dimitrov, Head of International Law Directorate, Ministry of Foreign Affairs	International law does not prohibit declarations of independence nor secession.; The declaration of independence did not violate any provision of international law.
Burundi	4 December 2009	Maître Thomas Barankitse, Legal Attaché	Declaring the declaration of independence illegal will not have any practical effect in this case because Kosovo exists as a fact; however the court should limit the right to self-determination only to the former and present colonies.; The court should determine that there is no right to create new states outside the process of decolonisation, but this will not affect the existence of the Kosovo state.
People's Republic of China	7 December 2009	Xue Hanqin, Ambassador to ASEAN, Legal Counsel of the Ministry of Foreign Affairs	There is no doubt that after the breakup of the Socialist Federal Republic of Yugoslavia, Kosovo was a part of the Federal Republic of Yugoslavia, that is, Serbia. Integral parts of sovereign states, under international law, do not have a right to unilateral secession ... while the principle of protection of territorial integrity is a cornerstone of international legal order.; Sovereign states have a right to prevent unilateral secessions and protect their integrity.; The unilateral proclamation is a violation of mandatory UNSC Resolution 1244 and this resolution is binding. In 1999 China insisted that the provision on the territorial integrity and sovereignty be included in the resolution, which came after NATO's illegal military attack and for this reason China did not block Resolution 1244.
Cyprus	7 December 2009	James Droushiotis, Ambassador of Cyprus to the Netherlands	The principles of international law do not support the unilateral declaration of independence by Kosovo. Neither the UN Security Council, nor anyone else has the right to amputate part of the territory of a sovereign state.; Kosovo is not a special case. Implementation of the international law must be universal.; The declaration of independence is a violation of UNSC Resolution 1244, which established a temporary international administration in the province, and guaranteed the territorial integrity of Yugoslavia.
Croatia	7 December 2009	Andreja Metelko Zgombić, Chief Legal Adviser in the Ministry of Foreign Affairs and European Integration	Kosovo was a constituent part of Yugoslavia and therefore had the right to self-determination and declaration of independence.; Kosovo Albanians, although they form 90 percent of Kosovo population, have for years been victims of repression by Serbian authorities.; The will of the people should be the basic element in determining the final status of Kosovo.
Denmark	7 December 2009	Thomas Winkler, Under-Secretary for Legal Affairs, Ministry of Foreign Affairs	Most of Kosovo's population, whose human rights were violated by Serbia for years, wanted independence.; The proclamation of independence is not in contradiction with international law because international law does not prohibit declarations of independence.; The declaration of independence of Kosovo cannot serve as a precedent upon which entities can seek separation from their mother country, as it would cause instability in the world.
Spain	8 December 2009	Concepción Escobar Hernández, Head of the International Law Department, Ministry of Foreign Affairs and Cooperation	The unilateral Kosovo independence declaration cannot be in accordance with international law because it violated the principle of territorial integrity and sovereignty of Serbia, which is engraved in the UNSC Resolution 1244. The unilateral secession is not allowed under international law, unless in case it concerns a colony and the evidence of this is the last year's EU report on the conflict between Georgia and Russia.; The resolution 1244 brought wise balance between the interests of the two sides and the two basic principles – territorial integrity and sovereignty of Serbia and the right of ethnic Albanians for self-determination through self-administration and autonomy.; The future status of Kosovo must be the result of a political process, and agreement between the two sides. Unilateral acts of one side cannot be considered an "agreement" which Resolution 1244 envisioned. The resolution is still in force, and the political process to search for solutions is still in progress, until the Security Council adopts a different decision.
United States	8 December 2009	Harold Hongju Koh, Legal Adviser, U.S. Department of State	The United States invites the International Court of Justice to leave the declaration of independence intact as an expression of the will of the people of Kosovo, either by refusing to comment on its legality, or by determining that the international law does not prohibit declarations of independence. The declaration of independence did not violate any principle of territorial integrity because under international law, only states must comply with this principle, and not internal entities.; The Court should not deal with the broader issue of self-determination in international law, or at least it should see Kosovo as a "special case".; There is no contradiction between the peacefully declared Declaration of Independence and international law, including Resolution 1244. Evidence of this is that 9 out of 15 Security Council members that voted for Resolution 1244, later recognised Kosovo as independent.; The Resolution 1244 has not guaranteed the territorial integrity of Serbia, but Yugoslavia, which now does not exist, and that only during the interim period of international administration in Kosovo.
Russia	8 December 2009	Kirill Gevorgian, Ambassador of Russia to the Netherlands	General international law prevents Kosovo from declaring independence, bearing in mind that the people of Kosovo do not enjoy a right to self-determination.; Russia rejects claims coming from those countries who support the unilateral declaration that international law "does not regulate independence declarations", and reminds that the UN Security Council declared Northern Cyprus and Rhodesia's independence to be illegal, since secession is forbidden outside the colonial context.; Violations of human rights of Albanians during the 1990s cannot be the justification for a unilateral declaration of independence in 2008.; Resolution 1244 cannot be overturned by a decision of UN secretary-general's envoy Martti Ahtisaari to end the negotiations and recommend independence as the only solution. Quoting the words of Kosovo Albanian representative Skënder Hyseni, who said that the negotiations were led on "whether or not Serbia will accept Kosovo's independence", Gevorgian said that Ahtisaari's failure does not mean that the process has been concluded.; We often hear that international law is no law, that it does not apply to precedents, and that power is the law. This case is a chance to demonstrate that international law is in effect.
Finland	8 December 2009	Päivi Kaukoranta, Director General, Legal Service, Ministry of Foreign Affairs	The Declaration of independence is a political act.; Independence of Kosovo is a fact and is a consequence of the failure of negotiations between Belgrade and Pristina carried with the mediation of the UN Secretary General's Special Envoy Martti Ahtisaari, former President of Finland.; International law does not address declarations of independence and the principle of respect of territorial integrity applies only between states, not for internal entities.
France	9 December 2009	Edwige Belliard, Director of Legal Affairs, Ministry of Foreign and European Affairs	The answer to the question about the legality of Kosovo's declaration of independence will be devoid of any practical effect. The secession is not in contradiction to international law, and the court should therefore refuse to decide on this matter.; The question of the legality of Kosovo's independence was artificially imposed at the UN General Assembly, which cannot act in any way.; The failure of negotiations is no reason for a declaration to be declared illegal, because it is not the cause but the consequence of failure.
Jordan	9 December 2009	Prince Zeid Raad Zeid Al Hussein, Ambassador of Jordan to the United States	The authorities in Belgrade, guided by nationalistic intentions since 1989, denied the people of Kosovo the right to self-government and participation in government by systematic repression.; The UNSC Resolution 1244 was adopted in order to end violence by the withdrawal of Serbian forces, and excluded the possibility that Kosovo would ever again become part of Serbia.; The declaration of independence was exercised as a last resort, after all negotiating avenues were exhausted.
Norway	9 December 2009	Rolf Einar Fife, Director General, Legal Affairs Department, Ministry of Foreign Affairs	The entities within the state are not bound by the principle of protection of territorial integrity.; Any declaration of independence is one-sided by nature, and in the case of Kosovo it was also the result of a multilateral political process.; The independence of Kosovo will not become a dangerous precedent in international relations, since Kosovo was a special case.
Netherlands	10 December 2009	Liesbeth Lijnzaad, Legal Adviser, Ministry of Foreign Affairs	The people of Kosovo had the right to self-determination and secession from Serbia because the Belgrade authorities systematically violated civil and human rights of Albanians for years. International law thus allows the proclamation of Kosovo's independence.; The violations of the rights of the Albanians by the authorities in Belgrade from 1989 to 1999 are thoroughly documented in UN reports, resolutions of the Security Council and the Hague Tribunal, and were admitted by Serbia before the International Court of Justice. After such breaches of their rights, no one could expect the people of Kosovo to agree to continue to live within Serbia.; Kosovo could not become a dangerous precedent in international law.
Romania	10 December 2009	Bogdan Aurescu, Secretary of State, Ministry of Foreign Affairs	Serbia did violate the basic human rights of the population in Kosovo during the last decade of the previous century; however, at the time of the independence declaration, Belgrade did not violate the rights of Kosovo's population.; Serbia in February 2008 is a completely different country when compared to 1999, and a decision on declaration of independence cannot be based on the circumstances of 10 years ago.; Kosovo had a specific status in SFR Yugoslavia, but it does not justify the secession, since at the time of the secession of Kosovo, SFR Yugoslavia did not exist for 16 years. The disintegration of SFRY ended in 1992, and Kosovo has since been an integral part of Serbia, and not an entity with the right to self-determination that would justify secession.
United Kingdom	10 December 2009	Daniel Bethlehem QC, Legal Adviser to the Foreign and Commonwealth Office	Serbia by initiating proceedings before the ICJ wants to set back the clock, and seeks an advisory opinion that would compel Kosovo to re-engage with Serbia over its status. There is, however, no reason whatever to believe that an agreed outcome would be any more achievable now than it was in the past. The United Kingdom warns about the misleading approach of Serbia, which would like the court to assess the legality of the declaration, ignoring the events that led to it.; Serbia has made it quite clear that it will never accept an independent Kosovo. Kosovo, for its part, has made it quite clear, that, given the legacy of abuse, it cannot again become part of Serbia. Courts do not order estranged spouses to continue in a broken marriage.; Although the Resolution 1244 referred to the territorial integrity of Yugoslavia, this principle was not the cornerstone for a political solution of Kosovo's status. The United Kingdom did not come to support independence for Kosovo quickly or easily and does not see these proceedings as adversarial to Serbia. Serbia's democracy is not much older than Kosovo's. Independence of Kosovo brought stability to the region after a traumatic decade. The common future for both Kosovo and Serbia lies in eventual membership for both States in the European Union and the United Kingdom will continue to work towards the realisation of that vision.
Venezuela	11 December 2009	Alejandro Fleming, Deputy Minister for Europe of the Ministry of Popular Power for Foreign Affairs	The right of peoples to self-determination applies only to the colonies, and Kosovo has never been a colony nor an independent state.; The Albanian population of Kosovo enjoys all minority rights in Serbia and there is no basis for the declaration of independence.; How is it possible that the negotiations can cause instability, but not the unilateral decision of a side unhappy with the negotiations?
Viet Nam	11 December 2009	Ha Huy Thong, Ambassador of Vietnam to the Netherlands	The resolution 1244 is binding for all UN members and is the basis for the solution of the Kosovo problem. It confirms the sovereignty and territorial integrity of the Federal Republic of Yugoslavia and Serbia and determines that Kosovo can have broad autonomy, but not the status of independent state. It stipulates that the solution to Kosovo's final status can be achieved only through the negotiating process, with the consent of both parties, and that only the UN Security Council can determine when that process is complete.; The principle of the right to self-determination, and thus the declaration of independence, is not dominant in relation to the foundations of international law – the preservation of the sovereignty and territorial integrity of a country.

At the end of public hearings, judges Abdul Koroma, Mohamed Bennouna and Antônio Augusto Cançado Trindade gave all parties until 22 December 2009, to answer questions related to claims that international law does not prohibit secession, regarding promises by participants of the parliamentary elections in Kosovo in 2007 to declare independence and the provisions of the Rambouillet accords from 1999.

== Legal arguments ==
=== Against the declaration ===
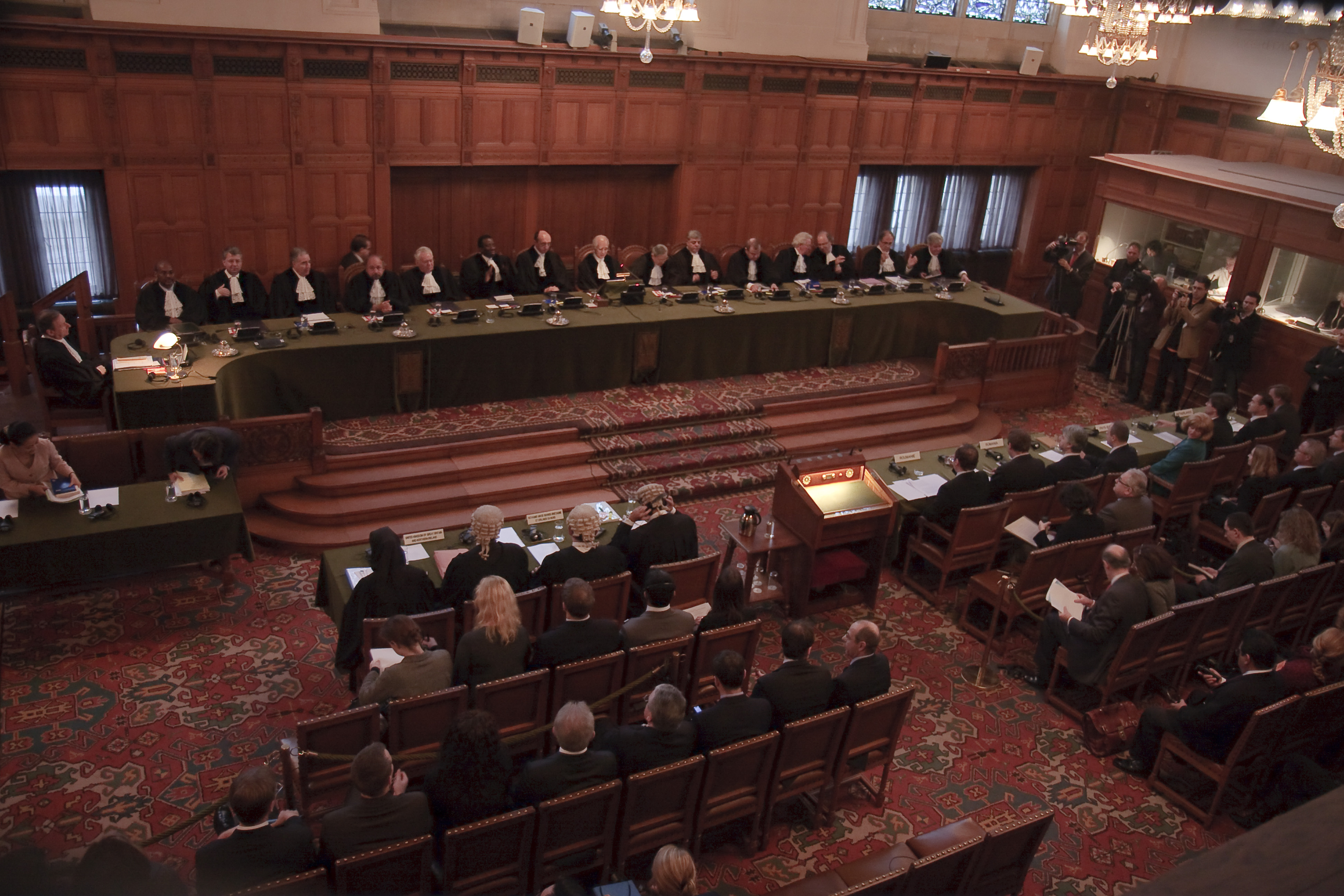
Public hearing of the "Accordance with International Law of the Unilateral Declaration of Independence by the Provisional Institutions of Self-Government of Kosovo"

The legal arguments against the unilateral declaration of independence provided by the various states focus on the protection for the territorial integrity of FR Yugoslavia in various significant international documents, including in the UN Charter and in UN Security Council Resolution 1244:

Reaffirming the commitment of all Member States to the sovereignty and territorial integrity of the Federal Republic of Yugoslavia and the other States of the region, as set out in the Helsinki Final Act and annex 2.

The arguments presented are not in general arguments against the moral right of Kosovo Albanians to self-determination, but focus on the legality or otherwise of the unilateral action of the Provisional Institutions of Self-Government. As UNSCR 1244 vested all authority in Kosovo in the Special Representative of the Secretary-General, the argument is that the Provisional Institutions had no power to declare independence.

=== In support of the declaration ===
The arguments presented in support of the unilateral declaration of independence cover five main aspects. The first is the presumption in international law that civil and human rights, including of minorities, should be protected, with the aim of demonstrating that these rights were abused by the then-governing Milošević administration. The second is the stress given in the appendices of documents such as UNSCR 1244 to a political process to determine final status, with the aim of demonstrating that such a process had been successfully concluded with the Kosovo Status Process. The third is that the references to the territorial integrity of Serbia are only in the preambular language and not in the operational language. The document is therefore silent as to what form the final status of Kosovo takes. The fourth is that the principle of territorial integrity constrains only other states, not domestic actors. The fifth is that the right of self-determination, which the ICJ found to be jus cogens in the East Timor case, is a right of all peoples, not only of those in a colonial context.

Another key argument is one of consistency – in the last legitimate Yugoslav Constitution, Kosovo had the same legal right to self-determination that was the basis for independence of five of the six Yugoslav Republics: Croatia, Slovenia, Montenegro, Macedonia and Bosnia and Herzegovina. Namely, in a series of constitutional amendments between 1963 and 1974, Yugoslavia had elevated the two autonomous regions, Kosovo and Vojvodina, to essentially the same legal status as the republics, with their own administration, assembly and judiciary, and equal participation in all the Federal bodies of Yugoslavia. Crucially, they held the same power of veto in the Federal Parliament, and were equally responsible for implementing, enforcing and amending the Yugoslav Constitution, as well as the ratification of agreements and the formulation of Yugoslav foreign policy. In the 1980s, the Milošević administration disbanded the institutions of Kosovo and unilaterally changed the constitution to strip the autonomous regions of these powers. This argument was invoked by Croatia in the ICJ process.

== Implications for international law ==
The declaration of independence triggered an international debate over whether the case has set a precedent that could apply to other separatist movements or is a special case. The recognition of Kosovo's independence by 97 out of 193 UN states, according to many sources, has given fresh impetus to other separatist movements. Months afterwards, Russia recognised Abkhazia and South Ossetia citing Kosovo's independence, which it did not recognise, as a precedent. It ultimately also led to increased tensions in Bosnia-Herzegovina, where Republika Srpska vetoed the Kosovo recognition on the ground that it would then secede in order to make up for the loss to Serbia.

The advisory opinion by the court was seen to have set a possible precedent that could have far-reaching implications for separatist movements around the world, and even for Serbia's EU membership talks. It was also read as being likely to lead to more countries recognising Kosovo's independence.

The ICJ itself limited the scope of its decision by stating that it "is not required by the question it has been asked to take a position on whether international law conferred a positive entitlement on Kosovo unilaterally to declare its independence or, a fortiori, on whether international law generally confers an entitlement on entities situated within a State unilaterally to break away from it" .

== Expectations ==
The day before the verdict, then President of Serbia Boris Tadić said that Serbia was ready for any decision, but believed the ICJ would fulfill its mission. Prior to the verdict the Belgian ambassador to Serbia, Denise de Hauwere, said Belgium hoped Belgrade would act wisely after the ICJ opinion was given saying "good relations with Kosovo are vital for Europe and that Belgium wants Serbia in the European Union, but that Serbia's fate is in its own hands. We expect that the reaction of all sides that are involved will be constructive." The Belgian Foreign Minister Steven Vanackere also reiterated his call in that he "hopes that all the parties concerned will react responsibly and will take on board the opinion of the International Court of Justice".

The Prime Minister of Republika Srpska, Milorad Dodik, said that regardless of the ruling "[Srpska, however,] will not destabilise anything. We will continue to pursue our recognizable policy ... respecting the territorial integrity of Bosnia-Herzegovina. However, if some other opinions are made, nobody can expect those who read the opinion not to interpret it as a message for the future."

Prior to the judgment, US Vice President Joe Biden said that the U.S. would not contemplate a retreat from Kosovo's independent status, while he also sought to reassure the Kosovar Prime Minister of the U.S.'s support. While State Department legal adviser Harold Koh said "Serbia seeks an opinion by this court that would turn back time ... [and] undermine the progress and stability that Kosovo's declaration has brought to the region."

== Verdict ==
=== Advisory opinion ===
On 22 July 2010, the court held that the declaration of independence was not in violation of international law. The President of the ICJ Justice Hisashi Owada said that international law contains no "prohibition on declarations of independence." The court also said while the declaration may not have been illegal, the issue of recognition was a political one.

The question put to the Court concerned the legality of a declaration of independence made by the Provisional Institutions of Self-Government, institutions whose powers were limited to those conferred under the framework of a United Nations Security Council Resolution. None of the participants in the proceedings had argued that those institutions had not made the declaration.

Nonetheless, the Court held that the declaration of independence was not issued by the Assembly of Kosovo or otherwise by Provisional Institutions of Self-Government or any other official body. Once this crucial finding was made, the question the Court had to answer no longer concerned any action of the Provisional Institutions of Self-Government, as the Court had held that those institutions had not made the declaration of independence.

In finding this, the Court referred to the fact that the declaration did not follow the legislative procedure; and was not properly published. The Court held that the words Assembly of Kosovo in the English and French variants were due to an incorrect translation and were not present in the original Albanian text, thus the authors, who named themselves "representatives of the people of Kosovo" were not bound by the Constitutional Framework created by the UNMIK which reserved the international affairs of Kosovo solely to the competency of the UN representative.

The judgment also stated that the Court did not "feel that it is necessary" to address "whether or not Kosovo has achieved statehood" or "whether international law conferred a positive entitlement on Kosovo unilaterally to declare its independence."

=== Voting breakdown ===
The concluding paragraph of the advisory opinion (paragraph 123), which is the operative part of the ruling (dispositif) contains three vote tallies: it proclaims that the Court unanimously found that it had jurisdiction to reply to the General Assembly's request for an advisory opinion; given that the case law of the Court recognises that it has the discretion to comply with such requests, the Court decided by nine votes to five to comply with this particular advisory opinion request. And, on the merits of the case, by ten votes to four, the Court decided that the declaration of independence was not in violation of international law.

Judge	Nationality	Comply with request for advisory opinion?	Declaration "did not violate international law"?	Further actions
Hisashi Owada (President)	Japan	Yes	Yes	None
Peter Tomka (Vice-President)	Slovakia	No	No	Appended a declaration
Abdul G. Koroma	Sierra Leone	No	No	Appended dissenting opinion
Awn Shawkat Al-Khasawneh	Jordan	Yes	Yes	None
Thomas Buergenthal	United States	Yes	Yes	None
Bruno Simma	Germany	Yes	Yes	Appended a declaration
Ronny Abraham	France	Yes	Yes	None
Sir Kenneth Keith	New Zealand	No	Yes	Appended separate opinion
Bernardo Sepúlveda Amor	Mexico	Yes	Yes	Appended separate opinion
Mohamed Bennouna	Morocco	No	No	Appended dissenting opinion
Leonid Skotnikov	Russia	No	No	Appended dissenting opinion
Antônio Augusto Cançado Trindade	Brazil	Yes	Yes	Appended separate opinion
Abdulqawi Yusuf	Somalia	Yes	Yes	Appended separate opinion
Sir Christopher John Greenwood	United Kingdom	Yes	Yes	None
Shi Jiuyong (6 February 1994 – 28 May 2010)	China	Did not participate in the case.		
Xue Hanqin (29 June 2010–)	China	Did not participate in the case.		
Result/Ruling		Yes, by vote of 9–5	Yes, by vote of 10–4	2 declarations; 4 separate opinions; 3 dissents

Note: Jurisdictional vote omitted since all participating judges were unanimously in favour.

== Reactions ==
Reactions to the verdict came from states, international organisations and non-state actors. Kosovo praised the verdict and said it can now move on with more recognitions and possible memberships of the EU and the UN. Serbian reactions were negative to the verdict while policymakers met in an emergency session to discuss Serbia's next steps to preserve its territorial integrity while vowing never to recognise Kosovo as an independent state, despite Kosovar calls to the contrary. The EU countries that recognised Kosovo praised the verdict and call for dialogue between Kosovo and Serbia, they also called for other states to now recognise Kosovo; all five EU states that have not recognised Kosovo stated that the decision is a narrow view only on the text of the declaration and they would not change their positions. Other states said nothing would change as a result. All supranational bodies supported the verdict in at least some part, while non-state actors hailed the precedent this opinion allows for. The majority opinion was subject to legal criticism by some commentators (and by the dissenting justices).

Karabakhi and Bosnian reactions were the most notable. The former celebrated the opinion as a precedent set and signalled a possibility of asking the ICJ for a similar opinion on the Nagorno-Karabakh conflict; while the latter was heavily split with politicians from the Republika Srpska saying that at some point in the future it could legally declare independence, and politicians from the Federation of Bosnia and Herzegovina saying that the opinion should not harm the country's status. Other notable reactions were Russia's opposition to the verdict, while Abkhazia and South Ossetia hailed it.

== See also ==
- Arbitration Commission of the Conference on Yugoslavia
- International recognition of Kosovo
- List of International Court of Justice cases
- Kosovo independence precedent
- Montevideo Convention
- Recognition (international law)
- Sovereignty
