= Jurisdictional Immunities of the State =

International Court of Justice decision

Jurisdictional Immunities of the State (Germany v Italy)
- Court: International Court of Justice
- Full case name: Jurisdictional Immunities of the State (Germany v. Italy: Greece Intervening)
- Decided: February 3, 2012

Court membership
- Judges sitting: Hisashi Owada (President), Peter Tomka (Vice-President), Abdul G. Koroma, Bruno Simma, Ronny Abraham, Kenneth Keith, Bernardo Sepúlveda Amor, Mohamed Bennouna, Leonid Skotnikov, Antônio Trindade, Abdulqawi Ahmed Yusuf, Christopher Greenwood, Joan Donoghue, Xue Hanqin, Giorgio Gaja (ad hoc)

Case opinions
- Separate opinion: Abdul Koroma; Separate opinion: Kenneth Keith; Separate opinion: Mohamed Bennouna; Dissent: Antônio Trindade; Dissent: Abdulqawi Ahmed Yusuf; Dissent: Giorgio Gaja

Keywords
- state immunity; jus cogens

Jurisdictional Immunities of the State (Germany v. Italy: Greece Intervening) was a case concerning the extent of state immunity before the International Court of Justice. The case was brought by Germany after various decisions by Italian courts to ignore the state immunity of Germany when confronted with claims against Germany by victims of Nazi-era war crimes. The court found that Italy was wrong to ignore German immunity, and found that Italy was obligated to render the decisions of its courts against Germany without effect.

== Facts ==
The original claims were based on a number of war crimes committed by German troops during World War II. The substance of the facts was not disputed by Germany. A number of international agreements and measures had been passed which purported to waive the claims of the victims involved, or make reparations. For instance, a 1947 peace treaty between Italy and the Allies purported to waive claims by Italian nationals; a 1963 agreement between Germany and Italy again purported to waive claims of Italian nationals for 40 m Deutsche marks in compensation. Germany had also passed various laws to effect individual compensation to victims of Nazi era atrocities.

=== Luigi Ferrini ===
Luigi Ferrini was an Italian who was deported from occupied Italy and forced to work in a munitions plant in Germany. In 1998 he instituted proceedings against Germany in lower court at Arezzo. The lower court and then the appeals court denied his claim, on the basis that Germany was entitled to state immunity. However, during 2004 the Italian Court of Cassation reversed this judgment on the grounds that state immunity is lost when international crimes are alleged. On remand, the lower courts entered judgment in favor of Ferrini.

=== Max Josef Milde ===
Max Josef Milde was a German soldier, member of the Hermann Goering Division, who during 2004 was convicted in absentia for war crimes involving a massacre of civilians in the Italian towns of Civitella in Val di Chiana and San Pancazio. In connection with this conviction, Germany was held jointly and severally liable for damages resulting from this act. The Court of Cassation reaffirmed its reasoning in the Ferrini case by affirming this judgment during 2008.

=== Distomo massacre ===
On June 10, 1944, hundreds of people in the Greek village of Distomo were massacred by German troops in retaliation for Resistance activities nearby. Survivors and relatives of victims of this Distomo massacre sued Germany in Greek courts during 1995. Germany did not appear and the trial court entered a default judgment, upheld on appeal by the Greek Court of Cassation. However, the Greek Justice Minister refused to grant the required permission to enforce the judgment in Greece. In response, the plaintiffs attempted to enforce the judgment at the European Court of Human Rights and in the German courts, but were denied on grounds of state immunity. Finally, after the Ferrini decision, the plaintiffs petitioned for enforcement in Italy; the Italian courts agreed to enforce the judgment and during 2007 the plaintiffs placed a legal charge on Villa Vigoni, a property in Italy owned by the German state.

== Procedural history ==
Germany filed its application to institute proceedings on December 23, 2008. The basis of the Court's jurisdiction was the European Convention for the Peaceful Settlement of Disputes, which during 1961 bound both Germany and Italy to submit subsequent disputes to the ICJ. Italy responded with a counterclaim that Germany should pay reparations for the original events. The counterclaim was rejected on the basis that atrocities predated the European Convention for the Peaceful Settlement of Disputes and so the Court did not have jurisdiction. During 2011, Greece petitioned and was allowed to intervene in the case on the side of Italy.

== Judgment ==
By a vote of 12 to 3, the court rejected both alleged exceptions to the doctrine of state immunity proposed by Italy.

Firstly, the court rejected a theory of "territorial tort", in which Italy would be entitled to ignore immunity because torts were committed on Italian territory. The court analyzed this exception within the narrow confines of the facts of the case: the torts were committed by an armed force during armed hostilities. The court noted that while the general territorial tort certainly has support for jure gestionis, or commercial activities of state, it is clear that such a tort is not meant to apply to armed forces engaged in an armed conflict. The court cited the European Convention on State Immunity, the United Nations Convention on Jurisdictional Immunities of States and Their Property, and the state practice of a number of countries to establish that there was little support for extending the territorial tort as much as Italy proposed.

Secondly, the court rejected a more expansive exception to state immunity, by which immunity would be lost if serious human rights violations were alleged and no reparations were forthcoming. Italy advanced three "strands" to this argument: Italy argued that the gravity of the violations required elimination of state immunity, that not to eliminate state immunity would effectively derogate from a peremptory, or jus cogens norm; and immunity was lost because the claimants had no other means of redress. Italy also argued that these three strands, if not each independently sufficient to warrant a loss of immunity, were sufficient when they were combined.

Addressing the first strand, the court noted that allowing a judicial enquiry into the gravity of the crime would defeat the purpose of immunity, which is to avoid the trial process. Additionally, that there is little support in international conventions and state practice for the idea that severity of a crime could eliminate state immunity. The court distinguished the Pinochet case, in which Augusto Pinochet was arrested despite immunity as a head of state, by stating that Pinochet was a criminal case against an individual, not a civil case against a state itself.

Addressing the second strand, the court distinguished between procedural and substantive rules and found that there was no conflict between substantive jus cogens prohibitions on enslavement, for instance, and procedural state immunity. The court noted that this was consistent with the ICJ's rulings in Armed Activities in the Congo and Arrest Warrant of 11 April 2000, in which jus cogens rules did not confer jurisdiction or abrogate immunities of officials. The court further noted that no state practice supported the argument that jus cogens rules displace immunity.

Addressing the third strand, the Court distinguished between immunity and the substantive rules of international law by which Germany might still owe reparations. A finding of immunity does not equal a finding that Germany did not owe reparations. The Court indicated that under that theory, the existence of immunity would depend on the final failure of a diplomatic solution, but the failure would be exceptionally difficult to identify.

Finally, having rejected the strands of Italy's argument individually, the Court rejected their aggregate as well, specifying that immunity could not be based on a substantive balancing test applied by national courts. After finding that Italy was obliged to grant Germany immunity before Italian courts, the Court found that the petition for enforcement of a Greek judgment (application for exequatur) was subject to the same rules and should likewise have been denied due to immunity.

By a vote of 14 to 1, the court found that Italy was obliged, by a means of its own choosing, to render void the decisions of its courts infringing the state immunity due to Germany.

Dissenting Judge Bennouna said there was a difference between state immunity and state responsibility. Granting immunity does not exonerate one from responsibility. In this case the court should have recognised that Germany admitted to their crimes, and therefore are responsible. If Germany wishes to have immunity, they need to assume responsibility in their own national courts, otherwise, they cannot rest on their state immunity.

== Development ==
In 2005 the Italian Constitutional Court ruled in Ferrini that sovereign immunity for the crimes in question violated the core rights guaranteed by the Italian constitution. Sovereign immunity would therefore no longer be applicable law in Italy for these war crimes cases.

In 2022, Germany sued Italy again for allegedly new violations of Germany's sovereign immunity.

== See also ==
- List of International Court of Justice cases
