= Bosnian genocide case =

2007 International Court of Justice decision

Application of the Convention on the Prevention and Punishment of the Crime of Genocide (Bosnia and Herzegovina v. Serbia and Montenegro)
- The seal of the ICJ
- Court: International Court of Justice
- Full case name: The Application of the Convention on the Prevention and Punishment of the Crime of Genocide (Bosnia and Herzegovina v Serbia and Montenegro)
- Decided: 26 February 2007
- Citation: General List No. 91
- Transcript: Written and oral proceedings

Court membership
- Judges sitting: Rosalyn Higgins (President), Awn Shawkat Al-Khasawneh (Vice-President), Raymond Ranjeva, Shi Jiuyong, Abdul G. Koroma, Hisashi Owada, Bruno Simma, Peter Tomka, Ronny Abraham, Kenneth Keith, Bernardo Sepúlveda Amor, Mohamed Bennouna, Leonid Skotnikov, Ahmed Mahiou (ad hoc judge appointed by Bosnia and Herzegovina) and Milenko Kreća (ad hoc judge appointed by Serbia and Montenegro)

Case opinions
- The Court affirms that it has jurisdiction; Serbia has not committed genocide; Serbia has not conspired to commit genocide, nor incited the commission of genocide; Serbia has not been complicit in genocide; Serbia has violated the obligation to prevent the Srebrenica genocide; Serbia has violated its obligations under the Genocide Convention by having failed to transfer Ratko Mladić to ICTY; Serbia has violated its obligation to comply with the provisional measures ordered by the Court

The Application of the Convention on the Prevention and Punishment of the Crime of Genocide (Bosnia and Herzegovina v. Serbia and Montenegro) [2007] ICJ 2, commonly known as the Bosnian Genocide Case, is a public international law case decided by the International Court of Justice. The ICJ (in 2007) ruled that the Srebrenica massacre constituted genocide.

== Facts ==
The claim filed by Dr. Francis Boyle, an adviser to Alija Izetbegović during the Bosnian War, alleged that Serbia had attempted to exterminate the Bosniak (Bosnian Muslim) population of Bosnia and Herzegovina. The case was heard in the International Court of Justice (ICJ) in The Hague, Netherlands. Oral hearings began on 27 February 2006 and concluded on 9 May 2006.

== Preliminary issues ==
The Respondent, Serbia and Montenegro ("Serbia") first raised an issue of jurisdiction. Serbia contends that the ICJ has no jurisdiction over it as it was not a continuator State of Socialist Federal Republic of Yugoslavia ("SFRY"). As such, it was not party to the Genocide Convention when the then proceedings were instituted, neither was it party to the Statute of the Court. Bosnia and Herzegovina ("Bosnia") argues that res judicata applies, as the issues raised by Serbia had already been resolved in the 1996 Judgment of the same set of proceedings that dealt with preliminary objections. The Court ruled that res judicata applies to preclude reconsideration of the jurisdictional issues raised by Serbia.

The second major contention pertains to the scope and meaning of Article IX of the Genocide Convention.

There was a dispute about the obligations of Treaty Parties. Yugoslavia submitted to the ICJ an argument that the only obligations of the state parties to the convention are to prevent and punish genocide by legislation, prosecution or extradition. Yugoslavia's argument that the state party could not be held responsible itself for acts of genocide was rejected by the ICJ.

The Court held that interpretation of the Convention turns on the ordinary meaning of its terms read in their context and in light of its object and purpose. The Court notes that the purpose of the convention is to criminalize genocide as crime under international law, and to enshrine an unqualified, independent undertaking by the contracting parties to prevent and punish genocide. On these observations, the Court held that the obligation to prevent genocide necessarily implies the prohibition of the commission of genocide, as "it would be paradoxical if States were thus under an obligation to prevent, so far as within their power, commission of genocide by persons over whom they have a certain influence, but were not forbidden to commit such acts through their own organs, persons over whom they have such firm control that their conduct is attributable to the State concerned under international law.".

== Judgment ==
The ICJ held that the Srebrenica massacre was a genocide. It stated the following:

The Court concludes that the acts committed at Srebrenica falling within Article II (a) and (b) of the Convention were committed with the specific intent to destroy in part the group of the Muslims of Bosnia and Herzegovina as such; and accordingly that these were acts of genocide, committed by members of the VRS in and around Srebrenica from about 13 July 1995.

The Court found—although not unanimously—that Serbia was neither directly responsible for the Srebrenica genocide, nor that it was complicit in it, but it did rule that Serbia had committed a breach of the Genocide Convention by failing to prevent the genocide from occurring and for not cooperating with the International Criminal Tribunal for the former Yugoslavia (ICTY) in punishing the perpetrators of the genocide, in particular General Ratko Mladić, and for violating its obligation to comply with the provisional measures ordered by the Court. The then vice-president of the Court, Awn Shawkat Al-Khasawneh, dissented on the grounds that "Serbia's involvement, as a principal actor or accomplice, in the genocide that took place in Srebrenica is supported by massive and compelling evidence."

The Court found:

(1) by ten votes to five,

Rejects the objections contained in the final submissions made by the Respondent [Serbia] to the effect that the Court has no jurisdiction; ...

(2) by thirteen votes to two,

Finds that Serbia has not committed genocide, through its organs or persons whose acts engage its responsibility under customary international law, in violation of its obligations under the Convention on the Prevention and Punishment of the Crime of Genocide;

(3) by thirteen votes to two,

Finds that Serbia has not conspired to commit genocide, nor incited the commission of genocide, in violation of its obligations under the Convention on the Prevention and Punishment of the Crime of Genocide;

(4) by eleven votes to four,

Finds that Serbia has not been complicit in genocide, in violation of its obligations under the Convention on the Prevention and Punishment of the Crime of Genocide;

(5) by twelve votes to three,

Finds that Serbia has violated the obligation to prevent genocide, under the Convention on the Prevention and Punishment of the Crime of Genocide, in respect of the genocide that occurred in Srebrenica in July 1995;

(6) by fourteen votes to one,

Finds that Serbia has violated its obligations under the Convention on the Prevention and Punishment of the Crime of Genocide by having failed to transfer Ratko Mladić, indicted for genocide and complicity in genocide, for trial by the International Criminal Tribunal for the former Yugoslavia, and thus having failed fully to co-operate with that Tribunal;

(7) by thirteen votes to two,

Finds that Serbia has violated its obligation to comply with the provisional measures ordered by the Court on April 8 and September 13, 1993 in this case, inasmuch as it failed to take all measures within its power to prevent genocide in Srebrenica in July 1995;

(8) by fourteen votes to one,

Decides that Serbia shall immediately take effective steps to ensure full compliance with its obligation under the Convention on the Prevention and Punishment of the Crime of Genocide to punish acts of genocide as defined by Article II of the Convention, or any of the other acts proscribed by Article III of the Convention, and to transfer individuals accused of genocide or any of those other acts for trial by the International Criminal Tribunal for the former Yugoslavia, and to co-operate fully with that Tribunal;

(9) by thirteen votes to two,

Finds that, as regards the breaches by Serbia of the obligations referred to in subparagraphs (5) and (7) above, the Court's findings in those paragraphs constitute appropriate satisfaction, and that the case is not one in which an order for payment of compensation, or, in respect of the violation referred to in subparagraph (5), a direction to provide assurances and guarantees of non-repetition, would be appropriate.

— ICJ press release

=== Dissenting opinion ===
The vice-president of the International Court of Justice, Judge Al-Khasawneh, dissented:

Serbia's involvement, as a principal actor or accomplice, in the genocide that took place in Srebrenica is supported by massive and compelling evidence — Disagreement with the Court's methodology for appreciating the facts and drawing inferences therefrom — The Court should have required the Respondent to provide unedited copies of its Supreme Defence Council documents, failing which, the Court should have allowed a more liberal recourse to inference — The "effective control" test for attribution established in the Nicaragua case is not suitable to questions of State responsibility for international crimes committed with a common purpose — The "overall control" test for attribution established in the Tadić case is more appropriate when the commission of international crimes is the common objective of the controlling State and the non-State actors — The Court's refusal to infer genocidal intent from a consistent pattern of conduct in Bosnia and Herzegovina is inconsistent with the established jurisprudence of the ICTY — The FRY's knowledge of the genocide set to unfold in Srebrenica is clearly established — The Court should have treated the Scorpions as a de jure organ of the FRY — The statement by the Serbian Council of Ministers in response to the massacre of Muslim men by the Scorpions amounted to an admission of responsibility — The Court failed to appreciate the definitional complexity of the crime of genocide and to assess the facts before it accordingly.

== Significance ==
Serbia's violations of its obligations stem not only from the Convention on the Prevention and Punishment of the Crime of Genocide but also from two "provisional protective measures" issued by the International Court of Justice in April and September 1993. The then Federal Republic of Yugoslavia was ordered explicitly "to do everything in its power to prevent the crimes of genocide and to make sure that such crimes are not committed by military or paramilitary formations operating under its control or with its support." The judges concluded that despite this explicit order, Serbia did nothing in July 1995 to prevent the Srebrenica massacre, although it "should normally have been aware of the serious danger that acts of genocide would be committed."

In reaching this decision, the court referred to the standard set by Nicaragua v. United States, in which the United States was found not to be legally responsible for the actions of the Contra guerrillas despite their common goal and widely publicised support in the Iran-Contra Affair.

Furthermore, according to the ICJ's judgement, "it is established by overwhelming evidence that massive killings in specific areas and detention camps throughout the territory of Bosnia-Herzegovina were perpetrated during the conflict" and that "the victims were in large majority members of the protected group, the Bosniaks, which suggests that they may have been systematically targeted by the killings." Moreover, "it has been established by fully conclusive evidence that members of the protected group were systematically victims of massive mistreatment, beatings, rape and torture causing serious bodily and mental harm, during the conflict and, in particular, in the detention camps." The Court accepted that these acts, on the part of the Serb forces, had been committed, but that there was inconclusive evidence of the specific intent to destroy the Bosniaks as a group in whole or in part. This includes the period up to 19 May 1992, when Bosnian Serb forces were under the formal control of the Federal Republic of Yugoslavia.

ICJ President Dame Rosalyn Higgins noted that while there was substantial evidence of events in Bosnia and Herzegovina that may amount to war crimes or crimes against humanity, the Court had no jurisdiction to make findings in that regard, as the case dealt "exclusively with genocide in a limited legal sense and not in the broader sense sometimes given to this term."

The Court further decided that, following Montenegro's declaration of independence in May 2006, Serbia, Serbia and Montenegro's successor, was the only Respondent party in the case, but that "any responsibility for past events involved at the relevant time the composite State of Serbia and Montenegro."

In reviewing the case in the judgement of Jorgić v. Germany Jorgić v. Germany, on 12 July 2007 the European Court of Human Rights quoted from the ICJ ruling on the Bosnian genocide case to explain that ethnic cleansing was not enough on its own to establish that a genocide had occurred:

"The term 'ethnic cleansing' has frequently been employed to refer to the events in Bosnia and Herzegovina which are the subject of this case ... General Assembly resolution 47/121 referred in its Preamble to 'the abhorrent policy of "ethnic cleansing", which is a form of genocide', as being carried on in Bosnia and Herzegovina. ... It [i.e., ethnic cleansing] can only be a form of genocide within the meaning of the Convention, if it corresponds to or falls within one of the categories of acts prohibited by Article II of the Convention. Neither the intent, as a matter of policy, to render an area 'ethnically homogeneous', nor the operations that may be carried out to implement such policy, can as such be designated as genocide: the intent that characterizes genocide is 'to destroy, in whole or in part' a particular group, and deportation or displacement of the members of a group, even if effected by force, is not necessarily equivalent to destruction of that group, nor is such destruction an automatic consequence of the displacement. This is not to say that acts described as 'ethnic cleansing' may never constitute genocide, if they are such as to be characterized as, for example, 'deliberately inflicting on the group conditions of life calculated to bring about its physical destruction in whole or in part', contrary to Article II, paragraph (c), of the Convention, provided such action is carried out with the necessary specific intent (dolus specialis), that is to say with a view to the destruction of the group, as distinct from its removal from the region. As the ICTY has observed, while 'there are obvious similarities between a genocidal policy and the policy commonly known as "ethnic cleansing"' (Krstić, IT-98-33-T, Trial Chamber Judgment, 2 August 2001, para. 562), yet '[a] clear distinction must be drawn between physical destruction and mere dissolution of a group. The expulsion of a group or part of a group does not in itself suffice for genocide.' ..."

— ECHR quoting the ICJ.

== See also ==
- List of Bosnian genocide prosecutions
- Croatia–Serbia genocide case
- List of International Court of Justice cases
