= Giorgio Gaja =

Italian jurist

His Excellency Giorgio Gaja

Judge of the International Court of Justice (Seat 12)
- In office 6 February 2012 – 6 February 2021
- Preceded by: Bruno Simma
- Succeeded by: Georg Nolte

Personal details
- Born: 12 July 1939 (age 87) Lucerne, Switzerland
- Education: Sapienza University of Rome

Giorgio Gaja is an Italian jurist. A scholar in international law, he was elected in 2012 as a judge of the International Court of Justice.

== Early life and education ==
Giorgio Gaja was born in Lucerne, Switzerland in 1939. In 1960, he graduated from the Sapienza University of Rome with a degree in law. After completing his degree, he pursued a career in academia in cities including Vienna, Oxford and The Hague. In 1968, he was awarded the Libera Docenza in international law. He also worked as a research assistant at the University of Camerino from 1964 to 1969.

== Academic career ==
Giorgio Gaja was appointed as the Professor in International Law at the University of Camerino in 1972. In 1974, he was made full professor of international law at the University of Florence. He was appointed as Dean of the University of Florence School of Law between 1978 and 1981. He has also been visiting professor at many institutions in the United States and Europe. These include Visiting Professor at Johns Hopkins University from 1977 - 1978, The Hague Academy of International Law in 1981, University of Geneva in 1983 and 1985, University of Michigan Law School in 1992, Columbia Law School in 1996 and the Graduate Institute of International and Development Studies in Geneva in 2001.

== Writer, essayist and publisher ==
Giorgio Gaja has published numerous essays and books on the field of international law, private international law and European Union law. Since 1989, he has been the editor in chief of the Rivista di Diritto Internazionale, one of the most prestigious periodicals on international law in Italy. He has been a member of the Institut de droit international since 1993. He is also a member of the Advisory Boards of the Common Market Law Review, the Columbia Journal of European Law, and the European Journal of International Law. He has also been the chairman of the Italian Society of International Law.

== International Court of Justice ==
Giorgio Gaja was appointed as counsel to the Italian Government in the ELSI case before the International Court of Justice. He was also an ad hoc judge in the following cases:

- Legality of Use of Force (Yugoslavia v. Italy)
- Territorial and Maritime Dispute between Nicaragua and Honduras in the Caribbean Sea (Nicaragua v. Honduras)
- Territorial and Maritime Dispute (Nicaragua v. Colombia)
- Application of the International Convention on the Elimination of All Forms of Racial Discrimination (Georgia v. Russian Federation)
- Jurisdictional Immunities of the State (Germany v. Italy: Greece intervening).

He was subsequently elected as a judge of the ICJ for a nine-year term beginning 6 February 2012.
