= 2011 International Court of Justice judges election =

The 2011 International Court of Justice election began on 10 November 2011 at United Nations Headquarters in New York City. In the set of triennial elections, the General Assembly and the Security Council concurrently elect five judges to the Court for nine-year terms, in this case beginning on 6 February 2012. From the eight candidates, the five winners were Giorgio Gaja (Italy), Hisashi Owada (Japan), Peter Tomka (Slovakia), Xue Hanqin (China) and Julia Sebutinde (Uganda).

== Background ==
The International Court of Justice (ICJ), based in The Hague, is one of the principal organs of the United Nations. Also known as the World Court, it adjudicates legal disputes between states, and provides advisory opinions on legal questions submitted by other UN organs or agencies.

The court consists of 15 judges, with five judges elected every three years. (In the case of death or other vacancy, a judge is elected for the remainder of the term.) Judges are required to be independent and impartial; they may not exercise any political or administrative function, and do not act as a representative of their home state.

Elections of members of the Court are governed by articles 2 through 15 of the Statute of the International Court of Justice.

Prior to the election, the composition of the Court was as follows:

Judge	Term starts / renewed	Term ends
(Sierra Leone) Abdul Koroma	1994	2012
(Germany) Bruno Simma	2003	2012
(Slovakia) Peter Tomka	2003	2012
(Japan) Hisashi Owada	2003	2012
(China) Xue Hanqin	2010	2012
(Morocco) Mohamed Bennouna	2006	2015
(Mexico) Bernardo Sepúlveda Amor	2006	2015
(Russia) Leonid Skotnikov	2006	2015
(New Zealand) Kenneth Keith	2006	2015
(United States) Joan Donoghue	2010	2015
(France) Ronny Abraham, President	2005, 2009	2018
(Somalia) Abdulqawi Yusuf, Vice-President	2009	2018
(United Kingdom) Christopher Greenwood	2009	2018
(Brazil) Antônio Augusto Cançado Trindade	2009	2018
Vacancy following resignation of (Jordan) Awn Shawkat Al-Khasawneh		

The seats of Judges Koroma, Owada, Simma, Tomka and Xue were thus to be contested at the 2011 election. Of these five, all except Bruno Simma were candidates for re-election.

Another sitting judge, Awn Shawkat Al-Khasawneh, also had left the ICJ, having been appointed prime minister of Jordan in October 2011. The election to fill that seat was not scheduled until 2012.

== Candidates ==
=== Qualifications ===
Article 2 of the Statute of the ICJ provides that judges shall be elected "from among persons of high moral character, who possess the qualifications required in their respective countries for appointment to the highest judicial offices, or are jurisconsults of recognized competence in international law".

=== Nomination procedure ===
Nominations of candidates for election to the ICJ are made by individuals who sit on the Permanent Court of Arbitration (PCA). For this purpose, members of the PCA act in "national groups" (i.e. all the PCA members from any individual country). (In the case of UN member states not represented in the PCA, the state in question may select up to four individuals to be its "national group" for the purpose of nominating candidates to the ICJ.)

Every such "national group" may nominate up to four candidates, not more than two of whom shall be of their own nationality. Before making these nominations, each "national group" is recommended to consult its highest court of justice, its legal faculties and schools of law, and its national academies and national sections of international academies devoted to the study of law.

=== 2011 nominees ===
By a communication dated 8 March 2011, the Secretary-General of the United Nations invited the "national groups" to undertake the nomination of persons as judges of the ICJ, and submit the nominations no later than 30 June 2011.

The nominated candidates for the 2011 election (grouped according to the informal distribution of seats among United Nations Regional Groups) were as follows:

Regional group	Vacancy	Candidate	Nominating national groups
Africa	(Sierra Leone) Abdul G. Koroma	(Sierra Leone) Abdul G. Koroma	Finland, Hungary, Republic of Korea, Russian Federation, Sierra Leone, Singapore
Africa	(Sierra Leone) Abdul G. Koroma	(Uganda) Julia Sebutinde	Croatia, Denmark, Uganda
Africa	(Sierra Leone) Abdul G. Koroma	(Senegal) El Hadji Mansour Tall	Senegal
Asia-Pacific	(Japan) Hisashi Owada	(Japan) Hisashi Owada	Argentina, Australia, Austria, Belgium, Brazil, Burkina Faso, Canada, Chile, China, Croatia, Czech Republic, Finland, France, Germany, Hungary, Italy, Japan, Lithuania, Mexico, Morocco, Netherlands, Peru, Poland, Republic of Korea, Russian Federation, Singapore, Slovenia, Spain, Sweden, Switzerland, Thailand, United Kingdom, United States of America
Asia-Pacific	(China) Xue Hanqin	(China) Xue Hanqin	Australia, Belgium, Bulgaria, Canada, Chile, China, Colombia, Denmark, Finland, France, Germany, Italy, Japan, Netherlands, New Zealand, Pakistan, Peru, Russian Federation, Singapore, Slovenia, Spain, Sweden, Switzerland, Thailand, United Kingdom, United States of America
Eastern Europe	(Slovakia) Peter Tomka	(Bulgaria) Tsvetana Kamenova	Brazil, Bulgaria, Hungary, Italy, Lithuania, Ukraine
Eastern Europe	(Slovakia) Peter Tomka	(Slovakia) Peter Tomka	Australia, Belgium, Cameroon, Canada, Chile, Colombia, Czech Republic, Denmark, France, Germany, Lithuania, Netherlands, New Zealand, Peru, Russian Federation, Singapore, Slovak Republic, Spain, Sweden, Switzerland, United Kingdom
WEOG	(Germany) Bruno Simma	(Italy) Giorgio Gaja	Argentina, Australia, Belgium, Bulgaria, Canada, Chile, China, Colombia, Denmark, Finland, France, Germany, Hungary, Italy, Japan, Netherlands, New Zealand, Peru, Spain, Sweden, United Kingdom

== Election procedure ==
The General Assembly and the Security Council proceed, independently of one another, to elect five members of the Court.

To be elected, a candidate must obtain an absolute majority of votes both in the General Assembly and in the Security Council. The words "absolute majority" are interpreted as meaning a majority of all electors, whether or not they vote or are allowed to vote. Thus 97 votes constitute an absolute majority in the General Assembly and 8 votes constitute an absolute majority in the Security Council (with no distinction being made between permanent and non-permanent members of the Security Council).

Only those candidates whose names appear on the ballot papers are eligible for election. Each elector in the General Assembly and in the Security Council may vote for not more than five candidates on the first ballot and, on subsequent ballots for five less the number of candidates who have already obtained an absolute majority.

When five candidates have obtained the required majority in one of the organs, the president of that organ notifies the president of the other organ of the names of the five candidates. The president of the latter does not communicate such names to the members of that organ until that organ itself has given five candidates the required majority of votes.

After both the General Assembly and the Security Council have produced a list of five names that received an absolute majority of the votes, the two lists are compared. Any candidate appearing on both lists is elected. But if fewer than five candidates have been thus elected (as happened in 2011), the two organs proceed, again independently of one another, at a second meeting and, if necessary, a third meeting to elect candidates by further ballots for seats remaining vacant, the results again being compared after the required number of candidates have obtained an absolute majority in each organ.

If after the third meeting, one or more seats still remain unfilled, the General Assembly and the Security Council may form a joint conference consisting of six members, three appointed by each organ. This joint conference may, by an absolute majority, agree upon one name for each seat still vacant and submit the name for the respective acceptance of the General Assembly and the Security Council. If the joint conference is unanimously agreed, it may submit the name of a person not included in the list of nominations, provided that candidate fulfils the required conditions of eligibility to be a judge on the ICJ.

If the General Assembly and the Security Council ultimately are unable to fill one or more vacant seats, then the judges of the ICJ who have already been elected shall proceed to fill the vacant seats by selection from among those candidates who have obtained votes either in the General Assembly or in the Security Council. In the event of a tie vote among the judges, the eldest judge shall have a casting vote.

== Election ==
=== Day 1: 10 November 2011 ===
==== Meeting 1 ====
Candidate	Security Council majority = 8	General Assembly majority = 97
(Japan) Hisashi Owada	14	170
(Italy) Giorgio Gaja	13	164
(China) Xue Hanqin	15	162
(Slovakia) Peter Tomka	13	149
(Uganda) Julia Sebutinde	5	109
(Sierra Leone) Abdul Koroma	10	88
(Bulgaria) Tsvetana Kamenova	4	73
(Senegal) El Hadji Mansour Tall	1	38

As in each of the bodies, 5 candidates received an absolute majority of votes, no further rounds of voting were required before comparing the two lists. Four candidates - Giorgio Gaja, Hisashi Owada, Peter Tomka, and Xue Hanqin - obtained majority support in both bodies and thus were elected Judges.

In order to fill the fifth slot, both bodies proceeded to further rounds of voting. Each time that both bodies produced a candidate enjoying majority support, the "lists" (on this occasion, containing one name each) were compared, and in case different candidates were preferred by the Assembly and the Council, technically a new meeting had to begin at each body.

==== Meetings 2 to 6 ====
Candidate	Meeting 3			Meeting 4			Meeting 5		Meeting 6	
Candidate	SC	GA - R1	GA - R2	SC	GA - R1	GA - R2	SC	GA	SC	GA
(Uganda) Julia Sebutinde	3	95	110	7	96	98	6	98	6	97
(Sierra Leone) Abdul Koroma	10	72	83	8	93	94	9	95	9	96
(Bulgaria) Tsvetana Kamenova	2	19	withdrew							
(Senegal) El Hadji Mansour Tall	0	7	withdrew							

The General Assembly and the Security Council were deadlocked over the fifth slot, with the General Assembly giving a majority to Julia Sebutinde of Uganda, and the Security Council giving a majority to Abdul Koroma of Sierra Leone. After Meeting 3, the statutory possibility opened for the Assembly and the Council to convene a "joint conference" consisting of six members, three appointed by the Assembly and three by the Council, in order to complete the election. However, upon proposal of the chairman based on previous practice, the Assembly agreed not to avail itself of this opportunity and voting continued in further meetings. During the final vote on that day, Koroma had 9 votes to Sebutinde's 6 in the Security Council, while Sebutinde had 97 votes to Koroma's 96 in the General Assembly.

=== Day 2: 22 November 2011 ===
Candidate	Meeting 7			Meeting 8		Meeting 9	
Candidate	SC	GA - R1	GA - R2	SC	GA	SC	GA
(Uganda) Julia Sebutinde	6	96	99	7	98	7	102
(Sierra Leone) Abdul Koroma	9	93	92	8	94	8	89

Balloting for the fifth seat resumed in both organs on 22 November, with three additional rounds of voting in the Security Council and four additional rounds of voting in the General Assembly. Koroma and Sebutinde were the only two remaining candidates. The two organs remained deadlocked, however, with the General Assembly giving an absolute majority to Sebutinde (in three rounds of voting) and the Security Council giving an absolute majority to Koroma.

On the last round of voting in the General Assembly, the result was 102 votes for Sebutinde and 89 votes for Koroma (with 191 out of 193 members voting). On the last round of voting in the Security Council, the result was 8 votes for Koroma and 7 votes for Sebutinde.

According to a Ugandan newspaper report (which was also carried in Sierra Leonean media), the African Union had unanimously endorsed the candidacy of Sebutinde, and on 22 September 2011 the Sierra Leonean foreign affairs minister had assured his Ugandan counterpart that Sierra Leone would formally withdraw Koroma's name from consideration. Koroma's name, however, was never withdrawn. Sierra Leone has never confirmed that it made such an undertaking. Rather, it continued to support Koroma strongly.

On 28 November, Uganda's representative at the UN Adonia Ayebare said the Ugandan Mission is working round the clock to ensure a Sebutinde victory.

=== Day 3: 13 December 2011 ===
Candidate	Meeting 10	
Candidate	SC	GA
(Uganda) Julia Sebutinde	9	97
(Sierra Leone) Abdul Koroma	6	83

Balloting resumed in New York City the afternoon of 13 December 2011, and Sebutinde was declared elected after receiving an absolute majority of votes in both the Security Council and the General Assembly.

== Aftermath ==
After the election, the composition of the Court was as follows:

Judge	Term starts / renewed	Term ends
(Morocco) Mohamed Bennouna	2006	2015
(Mexico) Bernardo Sepúlveda Amor	2006	2015
(Russia) Leonid Skotnikov	2006	2015
(New Zealand) Kenneth Keith	2006	2015
(United States) Joan Donoghue	2010	2015
(France) Ronny Abraham, President	2005, 2009	2018
(Somalia) Abdulqawi Yusuf, Vice-President	2009	2018
(United Kingdom) Christopher Greenwood	2009	2018
(Brazil) Antônio Augusto Cançado Trindade	2009	2018
(Slovakia) Peter Tomka	2003, 2012	2021
(Japan) Hisashi Owada	2003, 2012	2021
(China) Xue Hanqin	2010, 2012	2021
(Uganda) Julia Sebutinde	2012	2021
(Italy) Giorgio Gaja	2012	2021
Vacancy following resignation of (Jordan) Awn Shawkat Al-Khasawneh		

In 2012, Dalveer Bhandari (India) was elected to fill the remaining vacancy.
