= Yuji Iwasawa =

Japanese jurist

- 岩沢雄司
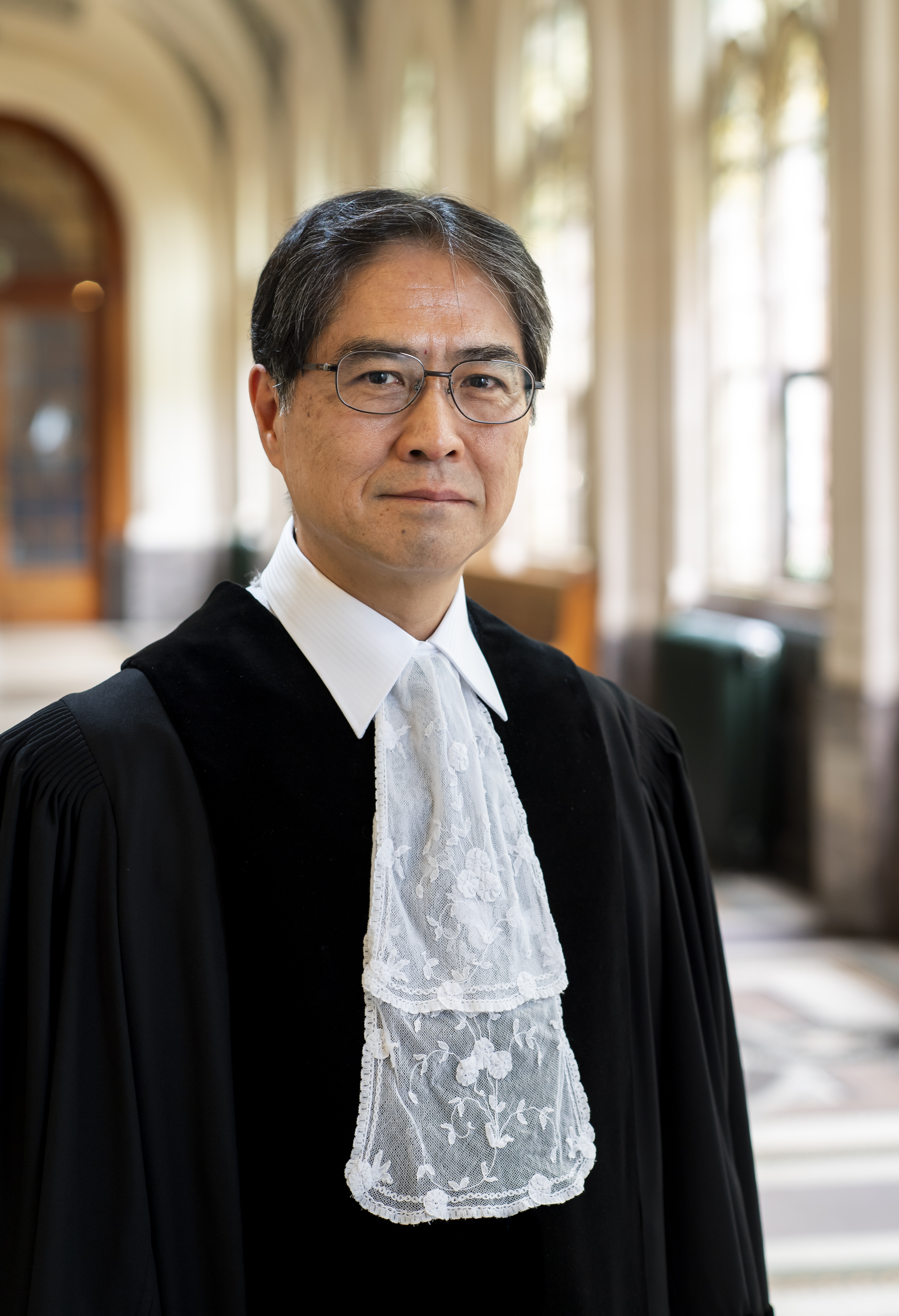
- Iwasawa in 2018

President of the International Court of Justice
- Incumbent
- Assumed office 3 March 2025
- Vice President: Julia Sebutinde
- Preceded by: Nawaf Salam

Judge of the International Court of Justice
- Incumbent
- Assumed office 22 June 2018
- Preceded by: Hisashi Owada

Personal details
- Born: Yuji Iwasawa; 4 June 1954 (age 72) Tokyo, Japan
- Education: University of Tokyo (LL.B); Harvard Law School (LL.M); University of Virginia (S.J.D)
- Occupation: Jurist

Yuji Iwasawa (岩沢雄司; born 4 June 1954) is a Japanese jurist and professor. He has been a member of the International Court of Justice since 22 June 2018, following the resignation of Judge Hisashi Owada. Before he was elected a judge, he was a professor of international law at the University of Tokyo. He was re-elected on 12 November 2020. He formerly chaired the United Nations Human Rights Committee.

Following the resignation of former president Nawaf Salam on 14 January 2025, he was elected as President of the International Court of Justice (ICJ) on 3 March 2025. He is expected to fulfill the rest of Salam's term until 5 February 2027.

== Education and career ==
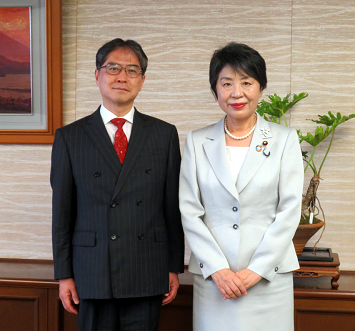
Iwasawa (left) with Yoko Kamikawa, Minister of Justice in 2018

Iwasawa was born in Tokyo in 1954. After graduating from Kunitachi High School, he matriculated at the College of Arts and Sciences of the University of Tokyo in 1973. He went on to specialize in public law at the university's Faculty of Law and graduated with an LL.B. in 1977. He later attended Harvard Law School in America, where he earned an LL.M. degree.

From 1982 to 1996, Iwasawa taught at Osaka City University (OCU) as an Associate Professor — for which he would later receive an honorary doctorate from OMU in 2018. During in his tenure there, he was awarded the 16th Mineichiro Adachi Memorial Prize in 1983. Subsequently, he attended the University of Virginia School of Law in America, where he completed an S.J.D. degree in 1997. From 1991 to 1993, he taught at the Lauterpacht Centre for International Law, part of the University of Cambridge. In 1996, he became an assistant professor at University of Tokyo, while intermittently spending a few years at the Lauterpacht Centre again. He was appointed Professor of International Law at University of Tokyo's Faculty of Law in 2005 and remained in that role until 2018.

In 2018, he ran in the judicial election following the resignation of ICJ Judge Hisashi Owada and was elected. He was re-elected in 2020 and is expected to serve as a judge until 2030. On 3 March 2025, Iwasawa was elected President of the ICJ following the resignation of Nawaf Salam. He is the second Japanese national to hold the position.

On 22 Oct 2025, Iwasawa issued the ICJ's advisory opinion, stating that the state of Israel as an occupying power is obliged to ensure the basic needs of the Gaza Strips's population.

Delivering on 19 November 2026, Iwasawa presided over the ICJ ruling of Myanmar's genocide against the Rohingya people.
