= Institute of the Right of Peace and Development - IDPD =

French research institute

- Institut du droit de la paix et du développement - IDPD
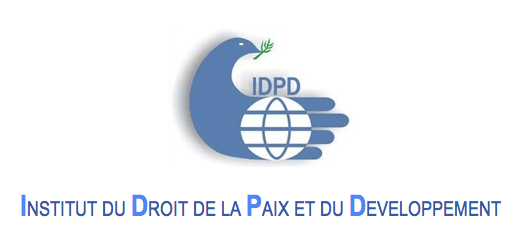
- Type: Public Research Center
- Established: 1968
- Affiliations: University of Nice Sophia Antipolis
- President: Jean-Christophe Martin
- Location: Avenue du Doyen Louis Trotabas 06050 NICE Cedex 1, Nice, France
- Website: idpd.univ-cotedazur.fr

The Institute of the Right of Peace and Development (IDPD, French: Institut du droit de la paix et du développement) is a French research institute in the field of international law located in Nice, France.

IDPD was established by René-Jean Dupuy (former president of Hague Academy of International Law) in 1968, and is a brainchild of the University of Nice Sophia Antipolis. It proposes MA, and Ph.D level programmes in various fields of international law and European law, including international security, functioning of international organizations, law of the sea and space law.

Considering the aims it pursues, the Institute works in close collaboration with other international organisations, such as the International Institute of Humanitarian Law, Sanremo or the Hague Academy of International Law.

== Partnership ==
- International Institute of Humanitarian Law (San Remo - Genève)
- Institute for the Economic Law of the Sea (Monaco)
- French Air Force Academy (Provence)
- United Nations - Nippon Foundation Fellowship

== Notable alumni ==
- Peter Tomka : Slovak judge, President of the International Court of Justice
