= Julia Sebutinde =

Ugandan judge (born 1954)

Her Excellency Julia Sebutinde
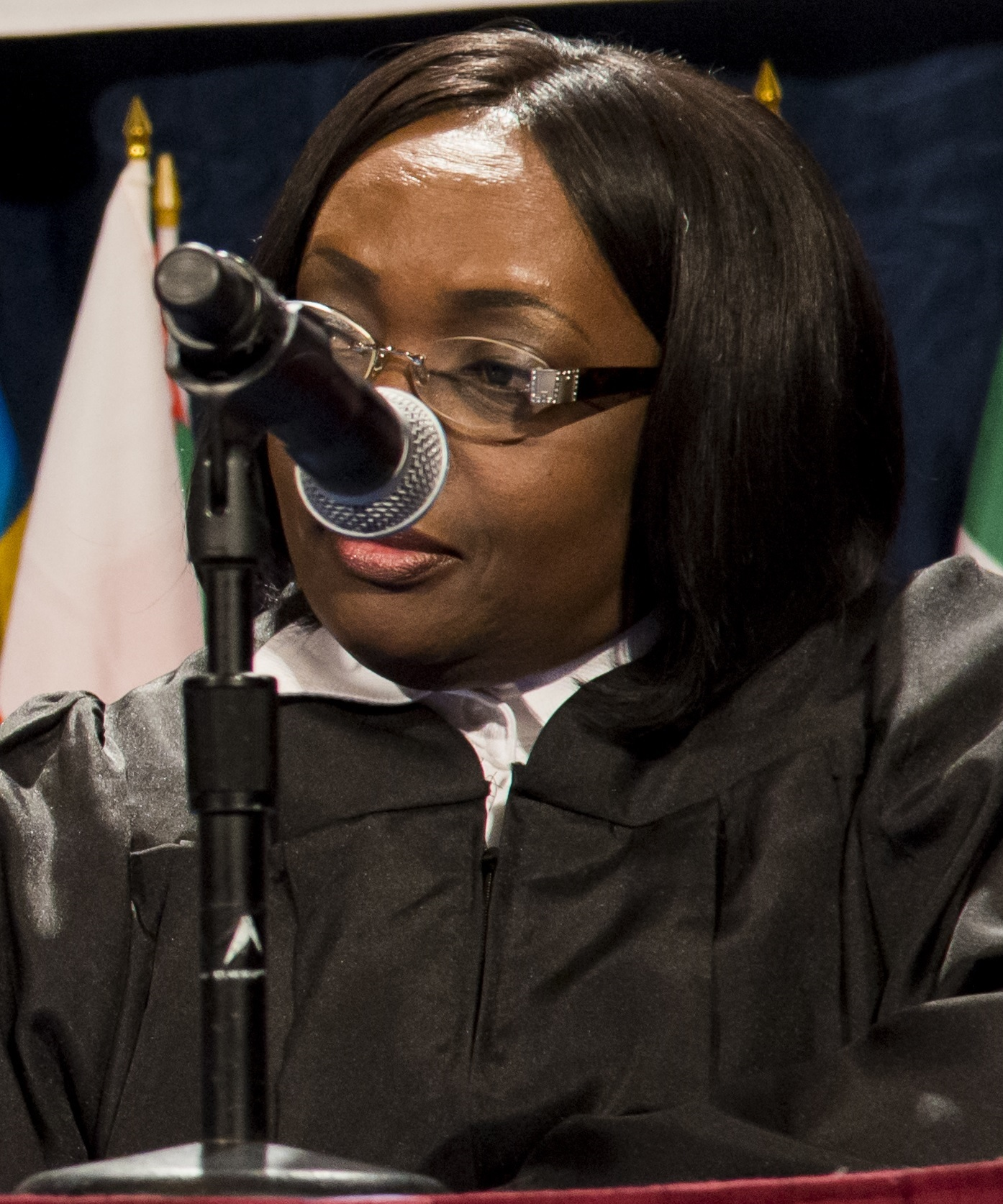

Acting President of the International Court of Justice
- In office 14 January 2025 – 3 March 2025
- Vice President: Herself
- Preceded by: Nawaf Salam
- Succeeded by: Yuji Iwasawa

Vice President of the International Court of Justice
- Incumbent
- Assumed office 6 February 2024
- President: Nawaf Salam; Herself (acting); Yuji Iwasawa
- Preceded by: Kirill Gevorgian

Judge of the International Court of Justice
- Incumbent
- Assumed office 6 February 2012
- Preceded by: Abdul Koroma

Personal details
- Born: 28 February 1954 (age 72) Kampala, British Uganda
- Spouse: John Bagunywa Sebutinde
- Children: 2
- Education: Makerere University (LLB); Law Development Centre (Diploma); University of Edinburgh (LLM)

Julia Sebutinde (born 28 February 1954) is a Ugandan jurist. She is currently serving her second term on the International Court of Justice (ICJ) following her re-election on 12 November 2020. She also is the current chancellor of Muteesa I Royal University, a university owned by the Buganda kingdom. She has been a judge on the court since March 2012. She is the first African woman to sit on the ICJ. Before being elected to the ICJ, Sebutinde was a judge of the Special Court for Sierra Leone. She was appointed to that position in 2007.

On 6 February 2024, Julia Sebutinde was elected Vice-President of the International Court of Justice. On 14 January 2025, she became the acting president upon president Nawaf Salam's resignation in accordance with the acting line of succession until Yuji Iwasawa's election as president on 3 March 2025.

== Background ==
Sebutinde was born in February 1954 in Kampala, Uganda, to a civil servant and a housewife with the Semambo surname. She attended the Lake Victoria Primary School in Entebbe in the 1960s. She then joined Gayaza High School and later King's College Budo, before entering Makerere University to study law. Sebutinde graduated with a Bachelor of Laws in 1977. She obtained the Diploma in Legal Practice from the Law Development Center in Kampala in 1978. In 1990, she enrolled at the Edinburgh Law School, University of Edinburgh for her Master of Laws, graduating in 1991. In 2009, in recognition of her body of work and contribution to international justice, she was awarded an honorary Doctor of Laws by the University of Edinburgh.

== Career ==
=== In Africa ===
Julia Sebutinde first worked in the Ministry of Justice in the Government of Uganda from 1978 until 1990. After graduating from the University of Edinburgh in 1991, she worked in the Ministry of the Commonwealth in the United Kingdom. She later joined the Ministry of Justice in the Republic of Namibia, which had just attained Independence at that time. In 1996, she was appointed Judge of the High Court of Uganda. In that capacity, she presided over three commissions of inquiry related to the following government departments:

- Corruption in the Uganda Police
- Corruption in the Uganda People's Defence Force
- Corruption in the Uganda Revenue Authority

=== At the Special Court for Sierra Leone ===
In 2005, Julia Sebutinde was appointed, with secondment from the Ugandan government, to the Special Court for Sierra Leone, established by the United Nations. She was later appointed the Presiding Judge in Courtroom II, at that time responsible for hearing the case against former Liberian president, Charles Taylor. In that position she refused to attend a disciplinary hearing against Taylor's lawyer.

=== At the International Court of Justice ===
In the 2011 International Court of Justice judges election, Sebutinde was one of eight candidates for five vacant judicial seats on the International Court of Justice, having been nominated by the national groups of Croatia, Denmark, and Uganda in the Permanent Court of Arbitration. In the election, a successful candidate needs an absolute majority of votes both in the United Nations General Assembly and in the United Nations Security Council. On the first day of voting, four candidates were elected but the fifth position was not filled. When voting adjourned, Abdul Koroma, the incumbent from Sierra Leone, had received 9 votes out of 15 in the Security Council, with 8 votes needed to elect. Over in the General Assembly, after five rounds of voting, Julia Sebutinde, the contender, had received 97 votes out of 193, with 97 votes needed to elect. When balloting resumed on 13 December 2011, Sebutinde received an absolute majority of votes in both the Security Council and the General Assembly, and thus was declared elected.

She was elected for a second term at the ICJ in March 2021.

Sebutinde was one of the 17 judges ruling on provisional measures in South Africa's genocide case against Israel. She voted against all the provisional measures, and was the only permanent judge to vote against any of the measures. Her dissenting opinion concluded that the dispute in question was essentially political rather than legal, and there was no plausible basis for finding genocidal intent on the part of Israel.

The Ugandan Ministry of Foreign Affairs subsequently released a statement that it supported South Africa's position and that Sebutinde's vote "does not in any way, reflect the position of the Government of the Republic of Uganda".

==== Plagiarism controversy ====
She was accused of plagiarizing large parts of her dissenting opinion from pro-Israel sources, as well as plagiarism from Wikipedia and the BBC. According to political scientist Norman Finkelstein, "at least 32 percent of Sebutinde’s dissent was plagiarised", including from writings from Douglas Feith.

The plagiarism includes multiple sentences that are identical with the column, The Forgotten History of the Term "Palestine", by Douglas Feith, such as "In 135 CE, after stamping out the second Jewish insurrection of the province of Judea or Judah, the Romans renamed that province 'Syria Palaestina' (or Palestinian Syria). The Romans did this as a punishment, to spite the 'Y’hudim' (Jewish population) and to obliterate the link between them and their province (known in Hebrew as Y’hudah).", appearing almost identical to Feith's writing. Furthermore, Sebutinde also wrote "When the distinguished Arab American historian, Professor Philip Hitti, testified against the Partition of Mandatory Palestine before the Anglo-American Committee in 1946, he remarked: 'There is no such thing as ‘Palestine’ in history; absolutely not.' ", a sentence that is almost identical to a page from the Jewish Virtual Library. Other sources that Sebutinde allegedly plagiarized from include a PragerU video from conservative activist David Brog, the Wikipedia page on the Yom Kippur War, a written statement from the International Association of Jewish Lawyers, a statement from Fiji's submission to the ICJ, and a 2016 paper by Abraham Bell and Eugene Kontorovich, the latter of whom "was gratified to see that the dissenting opinion by Judge Sebutinde at the ICJ made significant use of [their] argument".

==== Pro-Israel Bias ====
In August 2025, the Ugandan newspaper Daily Monitor published an article suggesting that Sebutinde's judicial decision were influenced by religious fervour, but the next month the same newspaper issued a public statement by Sebutinde stating that certain quotations were "never spoken by her", yet "wrongly attributed" to her.

On 25 August 2025, the International Commission of Jurists sent a communication to the president of the International Court of Justice Yuji Iwasawa, and urged him to remove Judge Sebutinde due to her partiality and pro-Israel bias. The International Commission of Jurists requested that the Court "undertake remedial actions consistent with Principles 17-20 of the UN Basic Principles. In the interim, I would request that you act to immediately remove Vice-President Sebutinde from participating further in proceedings in the South Africa v. Israel case."

== Other posts ==
Justice Sebutinde held the position of Chancellor of the International Health Sciences University, in Kampala, from 2008 to 2017.

== Personal life ==
Julia Sebutinde is married to John Bagunywa Sebutinde; they have two daughters.

Sebutinde credited Pastor Gary Skinner of the Pentecostal Watoto Church for having instilled and nurtured in her values of "integrity, honesty, Justice, mercy, empathy, and hard work".

== See also ==
- Solome Bossa
- Catherine Bamugemereire
- Esther Mayambala Kisaakye
- List of university leaders in Uganda
