= Bilateral Compensation Agreements for Victims of the Nazi Regime =

The Bilateral Compensation Agreements for Victims of the Nazi Regime (German: Globalabkommen) between the Federal Republic of Germany, colloquially referred to as West Germany, which the West German government concluded between 1959 and 1964 with twelve Western European countries, Austria, Belgium, Denmark, France, Greece, Italy, Luxembourg, the Netherlands, Norway, Sweden, Switzerland and the United Kingdom, to compensate victims of Nazi prosecution. In the bilateral agreements Germany settled on paying DM 876 million in what Germany considered voluntary compensation, without any legal obligation.

No agreements were concluded with any of the Eastern European countries which had suffered from Nazi occupation because of the political situation during the Cold War. East Germany did not participate in any of these bilateral agreements as it did not consider itself a successor state of the German Reich but it did, in the 1980s, conduct settlement agreements with Austria, Finland and Sweden.

== Agreements ==
Germany concluded agreements with the following countries:

Country	Year	Compensation
Austria	1961	DM 95 million
Belgium	1960	DM 80 million
Denmark	1959	DM 16 million
France	1960	DM 400 million
Greece	1960	DM 116 million
Italy	1961	DM 40 million
Luxembourg	1959	DM 18 million
The Netherlands	1960	DM 125 million
Norway	1959	DM 60 million
Sweden	1964	DM 1 million
Switzerland	1961	DM 10 million
United Kingdom	1964	DM 11 million

== Aftermath ==
Because of these agreements Germany denied any financial liability for subsequent compensation claims by war crime victims and their family members in subsequent court cases. It also eliminated, in its view, Germany's legal obligation to extradite war criminals to countries like Italy. After repeated cases of Germany being ordered to pay compensation by Italian courts, Germany took the matter to the International Court of Justice, claiming immunity (Jurisdictional Immunities of the State). In 2012 the ICJ ruled in Germany's favour.

In 1990 the reunified Germany conducted a similar agreement with the United States.

== See also ==
- Wiedergutmachung
- Reparations Agreement between Israel and West Germany
