= Croatia–Serbia genocide case =

2015 International Court of Justice decision

Application of the Convention on the Prevention and Punishment of the Crime of Genocide (Croatia v. Serbia)
- The Peace Palace in The Hague, the seat of the ICJ.
- Court: International Court of Justice
- Citation: Application of the Convention on the Prevention and Punishment of the Crime of Genocide (Croatia v. Serbia)

The Application of the Convention on the Prevention and Punishment of the Crime of Genocide (Croatia v. Serbia) was heard before the International Court of Justice.

The Republic of Croatia filed the suit against the Federal Republic of Yugoslavia on 2 July 1999, citing Article IX of the Convention on the Prevention and Punishment of the Crime of Genocide. The application was filed for Croatia by American lawyer David Rivkin. With the transformation of the Federal Republic of Yugoslavia into Serbia and Montenegro and the dissolution of that country in 2006, Serbia is considered its legal successor.

The Republic of Serbia filed a counterclaim charging the Republic of Croatia with genocide, on 4 January 2010. The application covers missing people, killed people, refugees, expelled people and all military actions and concentration camps with historical account of World War II persecution of Serbs committed by the Independent State of Croatia, puppet state of Nazi Germany, and Ustaše during World War II.

Both applications had a financial aspect, seeking compensation of damages. Opening arguments began on Monday, 3 March 2014 and lasted until 1 April 2014. On 3 February 2015, the International Court of Justice ruled that neither Serbia nor Croatia proved sufficient evidence that either side committed genocide, thereby dismissing both cases.

== Facts ==
Croatia waited until the conclusion of the Bosnian Genocide Case before it proceeded with its own case. Sakib Softić, who worked on the Bosnian case, stated that Croatia was in a much better position than his country was in its own court suit.

=== Preliminary objections ===
The Federal Republic of Yugoslavia returned its preliminary objections on 1 September 2002. On 18 November 2008, the court decided on preliminary objections to the case filed by Serbia. The court ruled against Serbia's three objections to the case, while finding that one of these objections was not purely preliminary. Finally, the court decided that it had jurisdiction over the case. Croatia was represented at the proceedings by its justice minister, Ivan Šimonović. The decision made headlines in Croatia and Serbia, especially as it fell on the anniversary of the fall of Vukovar in 1991 to Serb forces. Croatia has reported that since 1995, at least 120 mass graves have been discovered mainly in Eastern Slavonia, Dalmatia and Knin.

Serbian officials sought for Croatia to withdraw from the lawsuit on multiple occasions. Then President of Serbia Boris Tadić said that "Serbia considered in previous years, and still believes, that it is always better for all conflicts from wars during the 1990s to be solved in extra-judicial processes, through peaceful means, however, for such an approach of Serbia, partners on the other side are needed" and the Foreign Minister Vuk Jeremić said that "I think it would be better for Croatia for it to never come to this process. Our main goal and wish is not to sue each other, but to cooperate on the road towards EU integration, to build good neighborly relations, to solve problems which we have inherited." In November 2013 Serbia's Prime Minister Ivica Dačić reiterated a wish for mutual withdrawal of lawsuits between the two countries.

=== Serbia v. Croatia ===
Following the court ruling that it had the jurisdiction in Croatia's case, Serbian foreign minister Vuk Jeremić announced a plan to file a counter-suit against Croatia. The application was submitted on 4 January 2010. The document included information on crimes committed against Serbs in Gospić, Sisak, Pakrac, Karlovac, Osijek, Paulin Dvor and during the operations Operation Flash, Operation Storm and Operation Medak Pocket. The lawsuit also covered all those victims murdered after the war as they tried to return to the homes which they had left as refugees. The lawsuit against Croatia contained a historical account, with a focus on Second World War-era persecution of Serbs.

A public opinion poll in Serbia by Blic found that 69.7% of people supported the counter-suit, while 9.1% opposed it. The lawsuit has been opposed by the minor opposition Liberal Democratic Party whose leader said that "Serbia needs a smart foreign policy, which will not respond with a mistake to a mistake that was made in the last century by Croatia".

President Tomislav Nikolić of Serbia called for a mutual withdrawal of the genocide suits in January 2014.

=== Relation to the ICTY ===
The final verdict of the International Criminal Tribunal for the Former Yugoslavia (ICTY) in the case of Prosecutor v. Gotovina et al. was a reversal of conviction (de facto acquittal) of Ante Gotovina, a Croatian Army general, and his co-accused Mladen Markač. The other co-accused, Ivan Čermak, had already been acquitted of all charges. In response to this outcome, some German media speculated that it opened a possibility for Serbia to pay large reparations to Croatia.

=== Timeline ===
Date	Event
2 July 1999	Croatia files against the Federal Republic of Yugoslavia.
1 March 2001	Croatia submits a memorial to the ICJ, ahead of the March 14 deadline to do so.
1 September 2002	The Federal Republic of Yugoslavia submits a counter-memorial to the ICJ, ahead of the September 16 deadline to do so.
4 February 2003	The Federal Republic of Yugoslavia is reconstituted as Serbia and Montenegro.
25 April 2003	Croatia submits its written statement, ahead of the 29 April deadline.
5 June 2006	Serbia and Montenegro separate into individual countries with Serbia succeeding the state in all legal capacity.
26 February 2007	A judgment is delivered in the Application of the Convention on the Prevention and Punishment of the Crime of Genocide (Bosnia and Herzegovina v. Serbia and Montenegro).
26–30 May 2008	Public hearings on the preliminary objections in the case.
18 November 2008	The court rules that it has jurisdiction over the case.
4 January 2010	Serbia files a counter-memorial against Croatia.
20 December 2010	Croatia's submits its reply to the Serbian counter-memorial on the day of the deadline.
4 November 2011	Serbia submits its rejoinder on the day of the deadline.
30 August 2012	Deadline for Croatia to submit its additional reply to the Serbian counter-memorial.
3 March 2014	Start of the hearing of the case.
3 February 2015	Croatia v. Serbia ruling delivered - both cases dismissed.

== See also ==
- Croatian War of Independence
- List of International Court of Justice cases
