= Slovak Society of International Law =

The Slovak Society of International Law (SSIL) (Slovak: Slovenská spoločnosť pre medzinárodné právo) is a nonprofit, educational membership organization, based in Bratislava, Slovakia. It was founded in 1971 under the auspices of the Slovak Academy of Sciences. It has more than 100 registered members. Its mission is to study international law, achieve its enhancement in Slovakia and to promote enforcement of international law and principles of justice in international relations.

Judge Peter Tomka, former President of the International Court of Justice, is member of the Slovak Society of International Law (since 1984) and its Honorary President (since 2003).

== Slovak Yearbook of International Law ==
The Slovak Society of International Law has been publishing the Slovak Yearbook of International Law (SYIL) since 2007. SYIL is the leading Slovakian peer-reviewed international law journal appearing annually with articles and contributions in Slovak, Czech or English.
