= Hisashi Owada =

Japanese jurist (born 1932)

- 小和田 恆
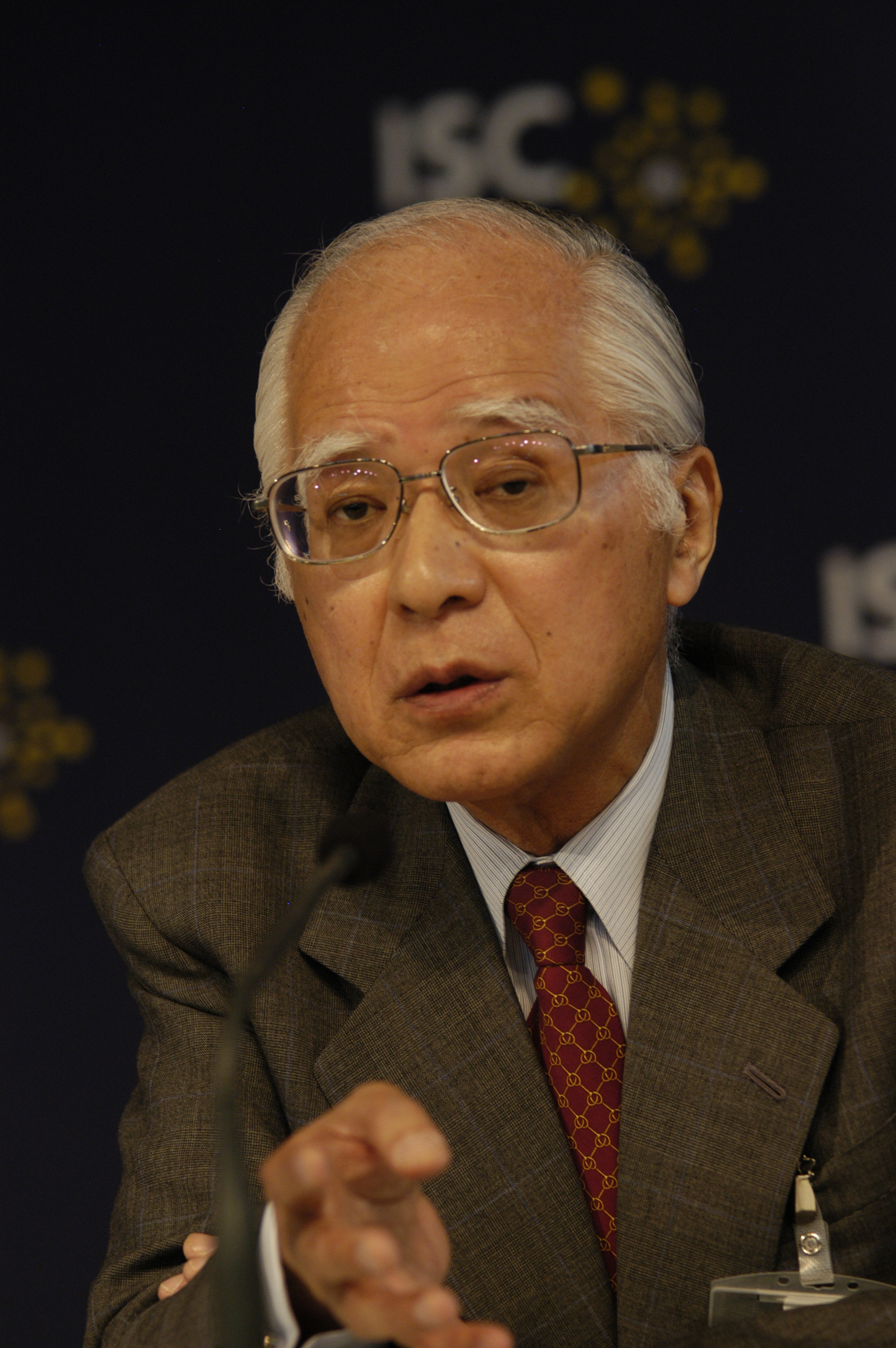
- Owada in 2003

President of the International Court of Justice
- In office 6 February 2009 – 5 February 2012
- Vice President: Peter Tomka
- Preceded by: Rosalyn Higgins
- Succeeded by: Peter Tomka

Judge of the International Court of Justice
- In office 6 February 2003 – 7 June 2018
- Preceded by: Shigeru Oda
- Succeeded by: Yuji Iwasawa

Personal details
- Born: 18 September 1932 (age 94) Shibata, Niigata, Japan
- Spouse: Yumiko Egashira (m. 1962)
- Children: 3, including Masako, Empress of Japan
- Education: University of Tokyo; Trinity College, Cambridge

Hisashi Owada (小和田 恆, Owada Hisashi; born 18 September 1932) is a Japanese jurist, diplomat and professor of law. He served as a judge on the International Court of Justice from 6 February 2003 until 7 June 2018, and was president of the court from 2009 to 2012. He is the father of Empress Masako and the father-in-law of the reigning Emperor of Japan, Naruhito.

== Early life and family ==
Owada was born in Shibata, Niigata Prefecture, Japan, the third of seven children.

Owada's father Takeo is descended from the Owada clan, whose head Shinroku—Masako's 4th-great-grandfather—was called to Murakami in 1787 to serve the Naito clan which the Tokugawa shōgun had installed as the city's rulers sixty-seven years earlier. After the fall of the shogunate, the Owadas participated in a salmon-fishing cooperative, the proceeds of which provided schooling for many local children, including Takeo.

Takeo became principal of a prefectural high school in modern-day Joetsu city and head of its board of education. Takeo and his wife would have seven children, all of whom survived infancy to graduate from university or teaching college. His five sons all graduated from the University of Tokyo—Akira, who would become assistant professor at the University of London and professor at Senshu University; Takashi, who would become a lawyer; Hisashi; Osamu, who would become head of the Japan National Tourist Organization; and Makoto, who would become an inspector at the Ministry of Transportation's Ports and Harbors Bureau. His two daughters Yasuko and Toshiko would marry highly, the former to managing director of Krosaki-Harima Tadashi Katada and the latter to one-time managing director of the Industrial Bank of Japan (IBJ) Kazuhide Kashiwabara.

== Career ==
After earning a Bachelor of Arts from the University of Tokyo in 1955, Owada passed the civil service examinations to join the Diplomatic and Consular Service, now known as the Foreign Service.

=== Educator ===
Owada received sponsorship from the Foreign Ministry to study at Trinity College, Cambridge in the United Kingdom where he earned a law degree in 1959 and later a doctorate of philosophy. Overall he served as a law professor for three decades at the University of Tokyo, Harvard Law School, New York University Law School, Columbia Law School, The Hague Academy of International Law, Waseda University, and the University of Cambridge. In between postings he took semesters as a visiting professor in international treaty law, his specialty, at Harvard and at Oxford. He also served as the Bright International Jurist-in-Residence at the University of Hawaiʻi's William S. Richardson School of Law in 2010. He has received honorary degrees from Keiwa College, Banaras Hindu University, and Waseda University.

=== Diplomat ===
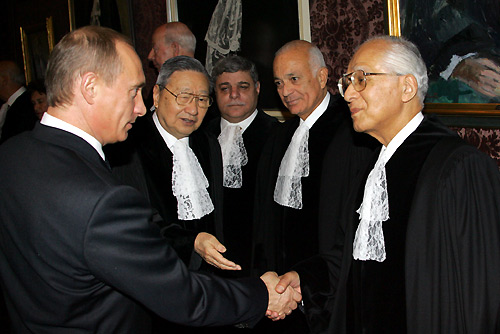
Vladimir Putin greeting Hisashi Owada, 2005

Owada's first foreign assignment was Moscow, serving from 1963 to 1969. Immediately following, from 1969 to 1971, was a post at the United Nations in New York, New York.

Returning to Japan, Owada was chosen to accompany Emperor Hirohito on his first postwar trip outside Japan to Europe. From 1976 to 1978, he served as private secretary to Takeo Fukuda, the Prime Minister of Japan.

From 1979 to 1981, while serving as visiting professor at Harvard Law School, Owada "remain[ed] on the Foreign Ministry payroll with the title of Minister at the Embassy in Washington, and would resume his career with another plum posting the following year." After this, however, the Owadas would move again to Moscow save for Masako, who would stay behind to enroll as a student at Harvard University.

In 1988, Owada was appointed Japanese ambassador to the Organisation for Economic Co-operation and Development (OECD) in Paris. He served for a year before returning to Japan, working first as Deputy Minister and from 1991 to 1993 as Vice-Minister of Foreign Affairs.

From 1994 to 1998, he served as Japanese ambassador to the United Nations, where he served twice as United Nations Security Council President.

From 1999 to 2000 Owada then served as senior adviser to the President of the World Bank. Owada was president of the Japan Institute of International Affairs and adviser to the Japanese Ministry of Foreign Affairs until 2003.

=== Post-Diplomat ===
Having been re-elected to the ICJ in 2011, Owada's term was set to expire on 5 February 2021 prior to his retirement in June, 2018. He received 170 out of 192 votes in the General Assembly on the first round, more than any other candidate, and 14 out of 15 votes in the Security Council on the first round. Owada had been nominated by the Japanese national group of the Permanent Court of Arbitration (as well as the national groups of 32 other countries).

He is currently a member of the Whitney R. Harris World Law Institute's International Council, and a member of the Crimes Against Humanity Initiative Advisory Council, a project of the Harris Institute at Washington University School of Law in St. Louis to establish the world’s first treaty on the prevention and punishment of crimes against humanity.

On June 18, 2025, Owada was awarded Doctor Honoris Causa degree by University of Pristina.

== Personal life ==
In 1962, at age 30, Hisashi married 25 year-old Yumiko Egashira, introduced to him by a mutual friend and later employer Takeo Fukuda. A year later, their eldest daughter Masako was born at Toranomon Hospital in Tokyo, followed by twins Reiko and Setsuko in the summer of 1966 in Geneva, Switzerland.

In 1993, Hisashi's daughter Masako Owada, a diplomat in her own right, married Crown Prince Naruhito, the heir to the Japanese Chrysanthemum Throne. Following Emperor Akihito's 2019 abdication, she became empress consort.

== Lectures ==
- Human Security and International Law in the Lecture Series of the United Nations Audiovisual Library of International Law
- Asia and International Law: A New Era Distinguished Speakers Panel in the Lecture Series of the United Nations Audiovisual Library of International Law
- The Encounter of Japan with the Community of Civilized Nations in the Lecture Series of the United Nations Audiovisual Library of International Law

== Notable International Court of Justice cases ==
- Sovereignty over Pedra Branca/Pulau Batu Puteh, Middle Rocks and South Ledge (Malaysia v. Singapore)
- Pulp Mills on the River Uruguay (Argentina v. Uruguay)
- Application of the Convention on the Prevention and Punishment of the Crime of Genocide (Bosnia and Herzegovina v. Serbia and Montenegro)
- Jurisdictional Immunities of the State (Germany v. Italy)
- Advisory opinion on Kosovo's declaration of independence
