= Peter Tomka =

Slovak judge

His Excellency Peter Tomka

President of the International Court of Justice
- In office 6 February 2012 – 6 February 2015
- Vice President: Bernardo Sepúlveda Amor
- Preceded by: Hisashi Owada
- Succeeded by: Ronny Abraham

Vice President of the International Court of Justice
- In office 6 February 2009 – 5 February 2012
- President: Hisashi Owada
- Preceded by: Awn Shawkat Al-Khasawneh
- Succeeded by: Bernardo Sepúlveda-Amor

Judge of the International Court of Justice
- Incumbent
- Assumed office 6 February 2003
- Preceded by: Géza Herczegh

Personal details
- Born: 1 June 1956 (age 70) Banská Bystrica, Czechoslovakia
- Education: Charles University in Prague (LLM, PhD)
- Occupation: Judge

Peter Tomka (born 1 June 1956) is a Slovak judge of the International Court of Justice. Prior to his election to the ICJ in 2003, Tomka was a Slovak diplomat.

== Early life and education ==
Tomka was born in Banská Bystrica, Czechoslovakia. He earned LLM and PhD degrees from Charles University in Prague in 1979 and 1985 respectively. In addition, he has also undertaken studies at the Faculty of International Law and International Relations in Kyiv, Ukraine, at the Institut du droit de la paix et du développement in Nice, France, at the Institute of International Public Law and International Relations in Thessaloniki, Greece, and The Hague Academy of International Law in the Netherlands.

== Career ==
In 1986, Tomka joined Czechoslovakia's Foreign Ministry as an assistant legal adviser, and in 1990 was promoted to head of the Ministry's Public International Law Division. The following year, he was transferred to the country's United Nations Mission, where he served as legal adviser. Following the division of Czechoslovakia, he served as Slovakia's deputy permanent representative from 1993 to 1994. From 1994 to 1997, he served as Slovakia's ambassador to the United Nations. Returning to the Foreign Ministry, he served as director of the International Law Department from 1997 to 1998, when he transferred to the post of director-general for international legal and consular affairs. After a year in that post, he was reappointed as Slovakia's UN ambassador, serving until his appointment to the court. He also held a seat on the International Law Commission between 1999 and 2002. He is member of the Slovak Society of International Law and has served as the organization's honorary president since 2003. He is also a member of the American Society of International Law and the European Society of International Law.

Tomka was elected to the ICJ by the United Nations General Assembly and Security Council; his first term began on February 6, 2003.

In parallel to his ICJ Membership, Tomka served in 2005 as an Arbitrator of the Belgium/Netherlands Iron Rhine Tribunal, which was presided over by ICJ President Rosalyn Higgins and in 2007 Tomka has been Member of the ICSID ad hoc Committee in the case of Malaysian Historical Salvors v. Government of Malaysia, which also comprises ICJ s Stephen M. Schwebel (President) and Mohamed Shahabuddeen. In 2009, Tomka was also on the ad hoc Committee in the MCI Power Group v. Republic of Ecuador Annulment Decision.

The judges of the ICJ elected Tomka as their vice-president on 6 February 2009.

In 2011 Tomka was re-elected to a second nine-year term on the ICJ by the UN General Assembly and the Security Council;. In 2020 he was re-elected to a third nine-year term on the ICJ.

In February 2012 Tomka was elected president of the court for a three-year term from 6 February 2012 until 2015.
