= Abdul Koroma =

Sierra Leonean jurist (born 1943)

Judge of the International Court of Justice
- In office 1994–2012
- Preceded by: Bola Ajibola
- Succeeded by: Julia Sebutinde

Personal details
- Born: 29 September 1943 (age 83) Freetown, British Sierra Leone
- Education: Kyiv University; King's College London

Abdul Gadire Koroma (born 29 September 1943 in Freetown, Sierra Leone) is a Sierra Leonean jurist. He was the ambassador of Sierra Leone to the United Nations between 1981 and 1985. He served two terms as judge at the International Court of Justice (from 1994 to 2012).

He was educated at Kyiv State University where he took LLM (Hons), and at King's College London, where he took an M.Phil. in International Law with a thesis entitled The settlement of territorial and boundary disputes in central Africa. He also holds an honorary LLD from the University of Sierra Leone, and is an Honorary Bencher of Lincoln's Inn.

Koroma was re-elected to the ICJ at the end of his first term, and was again a candidate for re-election in the ICJ judges election, 2011. On the first day of voting, four candidates were elected (including the other three incumbents who were candidates) but the fifth position was not filled. To be elected, successful candidates need an absolute majority in both the Security Council and the General Assembly. When voting adjourned, Koroma had received a majority of votes in the Security Council (9 out of 15), but was just one vote short in the General Assembly (96 out of 193 votes, compared to 97 votes for the other remaining candidate, Julia Sebutinde).

On 13 December 2011, in the final round of voting, Sebutinde obtained an absolute majority of votes in both the Security Council and the General Assembly. Therefore, Koroma's tenure on the court expired on 5 February 2012.

In recognition of his contributions to international law, a group of international law scholars and practitioners contributed to an essay collection in honor of Judge Koroma. The work, edited by Charles Jalloh and Olufemi Elias and published by Martinus Nijhoff Brill in July 2015, included contributions from four ICJ judges and noted African and non-African scholars of international law.

== Bibliography ==
Koroma, Abdul G. "Solidarity: evidence of an emerging international legal principle." Coexistence, Cooperation and Solidarity (2 vols.). Brill Nijhoff, 2012. 103-129.
