= Antônio Augusto Cançado Trindade =

Brazilian judge (1947–2022)

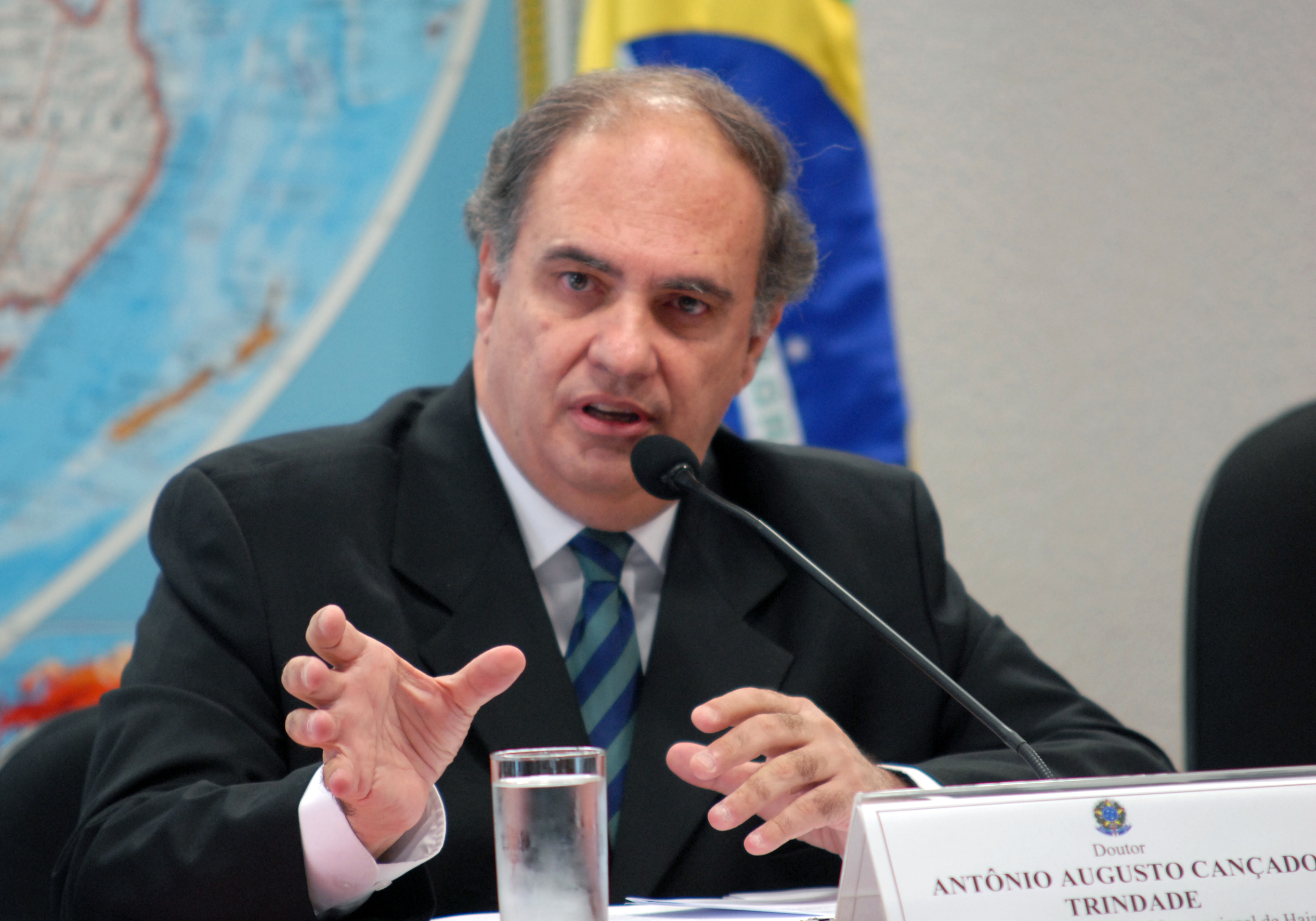
- Cançado Trindade at a committee of the Brazilian Senate in 2008

Judge on the International Court of Justice
- In office 6 February 2009 – 29 May 2022
- Preceded by: Gonzalo Parra-Aranguren
- Succeeded by: Leonardo Nemer Caldeira Brant

Personal details
- Born: 17 September 1947 Belo Horizonte, Minas Gerais, Brazil
- Died: 29 May 2022 (aged 74) Brasília, Brazil
- Education: Federal University of Minas Gerais (LL.B.); University of Cambridge (LL.M., LL.D.)

Antônio Augusto Cançado Trindade (17 September 1947 – 29 May 2022) was a Brazilian jurist and international judge. He was appointed as judge of the International Court of Justice (ICJ) from 6 February 2009. He was reelected to the Court in December 2017, and took office for his second term on 6 February 2018, serving until his death in 2022.

Before joining the ICJ, Cançado Trindade was a judge of the Inter-American Court of Human Rights from 1994 to 2006. He completed two terms as its president from 1999 to 2004.

Cançado Trindade was also a prominent scholar and prolific writer. Most recently, he was a professor at Utrecht University's Netherlands Institute of Human Rights (SIM).

== Education and career ==
Trindade's professional appointments and academic titles include:

- Professor (Full Professor/Professor Titular) of International Relations and International Law at the University of Brasília (since 1978) and at the Diplomatic Academy Rio Branco of Brazil (since 1979).
- LL.D. in International Law (1977), University of Cambridge, United Kingdom, with a thesis on "Developments in the Rule of Exhaustion of Local Remedies in International Law".
- LL.M. in International Law, University of Cambridge (1973)
- LL.B. in Law, Federal University of Minas Gerais (First Prize in Civil Law, 1969)

Cançado Trindade also served as a lecturer at The Hague Academy of International Law, the international law courses of the OAS's Inter-American Juridical Committee, the International Institute of Human Rights (Strasbourg) and at the Inter-American Institute of Human Rights (San José, Costa Rica). He was a visiting professor at various universities, among them Columbia University (1st semester 1998) and Institute of Higher International Studies (Panthéon-Assas University, sessions of 1988-1989). He was a member of the Curatorium of The Hague Academy of International Law until his death.

Prior to his appointment to the World Court, he served as a judge of the Inter-American Court of Human Rights from 1994 to 2008, including two terms as its president from 1999 to 2004, and had held several positions in important international organizations. Cançado Trindade was the author of 52 books and around 680 monographs, contributions to books, essays and articles on international law, published in numerous countries and several languages.

== Academic recognitions ==
- Yorke Prize, for Ph.D. Thesis in International Law (1977), University of Cambridge, U.K., with a thesis on "Developments in the Rule of Exhaustion of Local Remedies in International Law"
- Honours, International Institute of Human Rights, Strasbourg, France (1988)
- Honours, Inter-American Institute of Human Rights, San José, Costa Rica (1997)
- Honours, State University of Rio de Janeiro, Brazil (1999); and University of Brasília, Brazil (1999); and Federal University of Minas Gerais, Brazil (2002)
- Professor Honoris Causa, Universidad Nacional Mayor de San Marcos, Lima, Peru (2001)
- Doctor Honoris Causa, Central University of Chile, Santiago, Chile (2003)
- Doctor Honoris Causa, Catholic University of Peru, Lima, Peru (2003)
- Isidro Fabela Prize, National Autonomous University of Mexico (UNAM), Mexico City, Mexico (2003)
- Doctor Honoris Causa, American University of Paraguay, Asunción, Paraguay, (2004)
- Pontes de Miranda Prize, Brazilian Academy of Judicial Letters (2004)
- Honorary Visiting Professor, University of Rosario, Bogotá, Colombia (2005)
- Doctor Honoris Causa, National University of La Plata, La Plata, Argentina (2005)
- Annual Award of 2007 of the American Society of International Law (ASIL), Washington D.C., United States (2007)
- W. Friedmann Memorial Award, Columbia University, New York, United States (2008)
- Jurist of the Centenary of Hélder Câmara, Belo Horizonte, Brazil (2009)
- Emeritus Professor of International Law of the University of Brasília, Brazil (2010)
- Honorary Professor of International Law (Chair in International Tribunals), Utrecht University, Netherlands (2010)
- Honorary Fellow, University of Cambridge (Sidney Sussex College, 2011)
- National Prize of Human Rights, Brasília, Brazil (2011)
- Doctor Honoris Causa, University Panteion of Athens, Greece (2014)
- Prize of the Association of Magistrates of Brazil (Amagis, 2014)
- Doctor Honoris Causa, KIIT University, Bhubaneswar, India (2017)

Apart from his native Portuguese, he was fluent in French, Spanish, and English, and understood German and Italian.

== Lectures ==
- La perennidad del legado de los “Padres Fundadores” del derecho internacional in the Lecture Series of the United Nations Audiovisual Library of International Law
- La persona humana en el contencioso interestatal ante la Corte Internacional de Justicia in the Lecture Series of the United Nations Audiovisual Library of International Law
- Le système interaméricain de protection des droits de l'homme in the Lecture Series of the United Nations Audiovisual Library of International Law
- The Founding Fathers of International Law in the Lecture Series of the United Nations Audiovisual Library of International Law
- L’humanisation du droit international in the Lecture Series of the United Nations Audiovisual Library of International Law
- The Human Person and International Justice in the Lecture Series of the United Nations Audiovisual Library of International Law
- The Access of Individuals to International Justice in the Lecture Series of the United Nations Audiovisual Library of International Law
- The Contribution of Latin American Doctrine to the Development of International Law in the Lecture Series of the United Nations Audiovisual Library of International Law
- General Principles of Law as a Source of International Law in the Lecture Series of the United Nations Audiovisual Library of International Law
- The Human Person and International Justice in the Lecture Series of the United Nations Audiovisual Library of International Law
- Jus Cogens in Contemporary International Law in the Lecture Series of the United Nations Audiovisual Library of International Law
- The Law of International Institutions in the Lecture Series of the United Nations Audiovisual Library of International Law
- La Corte Interamericana de Derechos Humanos in the Lecture Series of the United Nations Audiovisual Library of International Law
- La expansión de la jurisdicción internacional y su importancia para la realización de la justicia in the Lecture Series of the United Nations Audiovisual Library of International Law
