= Bruno Simma =

German judge and legal scholar (born 1941)

Personal details
- Born: March 29, 1941 (age 85)
- Occupation: Jurist
- Known for: Served as a judge on the International Court of Justice (2003–2012)

Bruno Simma (born March 29, 1941, in Quierschied, Germany) is a German jurist who served as a judge on the International Court of Justice (ICJ), from 2003 until 2012.

He served as an affiliated overseas faculty member of the University of Michigan Law School, teaching classes in Ann Arbor until 2021, and as one of the three third-country arbitrators on the Iran–United States Claims Tribunal, to which he was appointed in 2013.

== Career ==
=== Positions as a judge, arbitrator, and member of UN expert bodies ===
Simma served as a Judge on the ICJ from February 6, 2003, until his term expired on February 5, 2012; he was not a candidate for re-election in the 2011 election. From 1996 to 2002, Simma served as a member of the UN International Law Commission, contributing to the Commission's work on state responsibility. From 1987 to 1996, he served as a member of the UN Committee on Economic, Social and Cultural Rights.

Simma has acted as an arbitrator in numerous inter-state, foreign investment, international commercial, and sports law cases. Among them, he served on the NAFTA Chapter 11 investor-state dispute panel in the Clayton/Bilcon case, in which a U.S. investor sought damages under NAFTA Chapter 11 after Canada and Nova Scotia rejected the investor's project to mine basalt and build a marine terminal on the Digby peninsula in Nova Scotia based on an environmental impact assessment conducted under federal and provincial law. Simma was part of the controversial majority decision that found the Government of Canada liable to the investor. The dissenting panel member warned that in key respects "the decision of the majority will be seen as a remarkable step backwards in environmental protection."

=== Academic career and honors ===
From 1995 to 1997, Simma served as dean of LMU Munich's Faculty of Law. Prior to returning to his native Germany, he served as a lecturer at The Hague Academy of International Law in the Netherlands, where he also served as director of studies in 1976 and 1982, and as visiting professor at the University of Michigan Law School during 1995. From 1987 to 1992, he served as a Professor of Law at the University of Michigan Law School, and as a visiting professor in 1986. From 1984 to 1985, he served as a visiting professor at the University of Siena in Italy. He served as a lecturer for International Law for the German Federal Foreign Ministry's Training Centre for Junior Diplomats. He is a member of the advisory board of the Goettingen Journal of International Law.

Among his approximately 120 publications, Simma is widely known as the editor of the authoritative The Charter of the United Nations: A Commentary (Oxford U. Press, 1994, 2nd and 3rd editions published in 2002 and 2012), over 2600 pages in its 3rd edition. Simma's treatise is considered "the primary English reference book" on the UN Charter, in particular for international law questions.

Simma has received honorary degrees from the Universities of Macerata, Glasgow and Innsbruck.

== Notable ICJ decisions ==
- Jurisdictional Immunities of the State (Germany v. Italy)
- Legal Consequences of the Construction of a Wall in the Occupied Palestinian Territory
- Oil Platforms (Islamic Republic of Iran v United States of America)
- Armed Activities on the Territory of the Congo (Democratic Republic of the Congo v. Uganda)

== Other activities ==
- Max Planck Institute for Comparative Public Law and International Law, Member of the Board of Trustees
