= List of International Court of Justice cases =

Seal of the International Court of Justice

The list of International Court of Justice cases includes contentious cases and advisory opinions brought to the International Court of Justice (ICJ) since its creation in 1946. Forming a key part of international law, 202 cases have been entered onto the General List for consideration before the court.

The jurisdiction of the ICJ is limited. Only states have standing to bring a compulsory claim against another state, and then only with the consent of the responding state. However, certain United Nations bodies and agencies such as the UN General Assembly have the power to submit questions for advisory opinions. Although these advisory opinions are not binding under international law, they do provide the ICJ's interpretation of what international law is.

== List of cases ==
The list is organized by and includes only those disputes assigned a General List number by the registrar of the court. In the early days of the court, any formally correct application was accepted by the registrar and entered on to the General List. If there was no jurisdiction (because of lack of consent by the responding party), the case was soon closed by the court. In 1978, however, the Court amended its rules and instructed the registrar to only enter a case on the General List if there was consent by the responding party, seemingly reducing the problem of meritless applications. However, at times consent and therefore jurisdiction is contested by the responding party. Such a case may be ordered to be added to the General List over the protestations of the respondent to allow the court to decide whether there is consent. In such a situation, however, the mere addition of a dispute to the General List does not have legal significance.

No.	Name	Applicant	Respondent	Case began	Case ended	Disposition
1	Corfu Channel Case	United Kingdom	Albania	22 May 1947	9 April 1949	Judgment on Merits
2	General List Number 2 assigned to some elements of Corfu Channel Case					
3	Conditions of Admission of a State to Membership in the United Nations	United Nations General Assembly		24 November 1947	9 April 1949	Opinion on Merits
4	Reparation for Injuries Suffered in the Service of the United Nations	United Nations General Assembly		7 December 1948	11 April 1949	Opinion on Merits
5	Fisheries Case	United Kingdom	Norway	28 September 1949	18 December 1951	Judgment on Merits
6	Case Concerning the Protection of French Nationals and Protected Persons in Egypt	France	Egypt	13 October 1949	29 March 1950	Discontinued
7	Asylum Case	Colombia; Peru		15 October 1949	20 November 1950	Judgment on Merits
8	Interpretation of Peace Treaties with Bulgaria, Hungary and Romania	United Nations General Assembly		31 October 1949	18 July 1950	Opinion on Merits
9	Competence of the General Assembly for the Admission of a State to the United Nations	United Nations General Assembly		28 November 1949	3 March 1950	Opinion on Merits
10	International Status of South West Africa	United Nations General Assembly		27 December 1949	11 July 1950	Opinion on Merits
11	Rights of Nationals of the United States of America in Morocco	France	United States	28 October 1950	27 August 1952	Judgment on Merits
12	Reservations to the Convention on the Prevention and Punishment of the Crime of Genocide	United Nations General Assembly		20 November 1950	28 May 1951	Opinion on Merits
13	Request for Interpretation of the Judgment of 20 November 1950 in the Asylum Case	Colombia	Peru	20 November 1950	27 November 1950	Judgment on Admissibility
14	Haya de la Torre	Colombia	Peru	13 December 1950	19 May 1953	Judgment on Merits
15	Ambatielos Case	Greece	United Kingdom	9 April 1951	19 May 1953	Judgment on Merits
16	Anglo-Iranian Oil Co.	United Kingdom	Iran	26 May 1951	22 July 1952	Judgment on Jurisdiction
17	Minquiers and Ecrehos Case	France; United Kingdom		5 December 1951	17 November 1953	Judgment on Merits
18	Nottebohm Case	Liechtenstein	Guatemala	17 December 1951	6 April 1955	Judgment on Merits
19	Monetary Gold Removed from Rome in 1943	Italy	France; United Kingdom; United States	19 May 1953	15 June 1954	Judgment on Jurisdiction
20	Electricite de Beyrouth Company Case	France	Lebanon	15 August 1953	29 July 1954	Case Dismissed
21	Effect of Awards of Compensation Made by the United Nations Administrative Tribunal	United Nations General Assembly		21 December 1953	13 July 1954	Opinion on Merits
22	Treatment in Hungary of Aircraft and Crew of the United States (United States v. Hungary)	United States	Hungary	3 March 1954	12 July 1954	Discontinued
23	Treatment in Hungary of Aircraft and Crew of the United States (United States v. Soviet Union)	United States	Soviet Union	3 March 1954	12 July 1954	Discontinued
24	Voting Procedure on Questions relating to Reports and Petitions concerning the Territory of South West Africa	United Nations General Assembly		6 December 1954	7 June 1955	Opinion on Merits
25	Aerial Incident of 10 March 1953	United States	Czechoslovakia	29 March 1955	14 March 1956	Discontinued
26	Antarctica (United Kingdom v. Argentina)	United Kingdom	Argentina	4 May 1955	16 March 1956	Discontinued
27	Antarctica (United Kingdom v. Chile)	United Kingdom	Chile	4 May 1955	16 March 1956	Discontinued
28	Aerial Incident of 7 October 1952	United States	Soviet Union	2 June 1955	14 March 1956	Discontinued
29	Certain Norwegian Loans	France	Norway	6 July 1955	6 July 1957	Judgment on Merits
30	Judgments of the Administrative Tribunal of the ILO upon Complaints made against UNESCO	(UNESCO) United Nations Educational, Scientific and Cultural Organization		2 December 1955	23 October 1956	Opinion on Merits
31	Admissibility of Hearings of Petitioners by the Committee on South West Africa	United Nations General Assembly		19 December 1955	1 June 1956	Opinion on Merits
32	Right of Passage over Indian Territory	Portugal	India	22 December 1955	12 April 1960	Judgment on Merits
33	Application of the Convention of 1902 Governing the Guardianship of Infants	Netherlands	Sweden	10 July 1957	28 November 1958	Judgment on Merits
34	Interhandel Case	Switzerland	United States	2 October 1957	21 March 1959	Judgment on Jurisdiction
35	Aerial Incident of 27 July 1955	Israel	Bulgaria	16 October 1957	26 May 1959	Judgment on Jurisdiction
36	Aerial Incident of 27 July 1955	United States	Bulgaria	28 October 1957	30 May 1960	Discontinued
37	Aerial Incident of 27 July 1955	United Kingdom	Bulgaria	22 November 1957	3 August 1959	Discontinued
38	Sovereignty over Certain Frontier Land	Belgium; Netherlands		27 November 1957	20 June 1959	Judgment on Merits
39	Arbitral Award Made by the King of Spain on 23 December 1906	Honduras	Nicaragua	1 July 1958	18 November 1960	Judgment on Merits
40	Aerial Incident of 4 September 1954	United States	Soviet Union	22 August 1958	9 December 1958	Discontinued
41	Barcelona Traction, Light and Power Company	Belgium	Spain	23 September 1958	10 April 1961	Discontinued
42	Compagnie du Port, des Quais et des Entrepôts de Beyrouth and Société Radio-Orient (France v. Lebanon)	France	Lebanon	13 February 1959	31 August 1960	Discontinued
43	Constitution of the Maritime Safety Committee of the Inter-Governmental Maritime Consultative Organization	International Maritime Organization		25 March 1959	8 June 1960	Opinion on Merits
44	Aerial Incident of 7 November 1954	United States	Soviet Union	8 July 1957	7 October 1959	Discontinued
45	Preah Vihear	Cambodia	Thailand	6 October 1959	15 June 1962	Judgment on Merits
46	South West Africa (Ethiopia v. South Africa)	Ethiopia	South Africa	4 November 1960	18 July 1966	Judgment on Merits
47	South West Africa (Liberia v. South Africa)	Liberia	South Africa	4 November 1960	18 July 1966	Judgment on Merits
48	Northern Cameroons	Cameroon	United Kingdom	30 May 1961	2 December 1963	Judgment on Jurisdiction
49	Certain Expenses of the United Nations	United Nations General Assembly		21 December 1961	20 July 1962	Opinion on Merits
50	Barcelona Traction, Light, and Power Company (New Application: 1962)	Belgium	Spain	19 June 1962	5 February 1970	Judgment on Merits
51	North Sea Continental Shelf cases	Denmark; West Germany		20 February 1967	20 February 1969	Joined proceedings Judgment on Merits
52	North Sea Continental Shelf cases	Netherlands; West Germany		20 February 1967	20 February 1969	Joined proceedings Judgment on Merits
53	Legal Consequences for States of the Continued Presence of South Africa in Namibia (South West Africa) notwithstanding Security Council Resolution 276	United Nations Security Council		5 August 1970	21 June 1971	Opinion on Merits
54	Appeal Relating to the Jurisdiction of the ICAO Council	India	Pakistan	30 August 1971	18 August 1972	Judgment on Jurisdiction
55	Fisheries Jurisdiction (Germany v. Iceland)	West Germany	Iceland	5 June 1972	25 July 1974	Judgment on Merits
56	Fisheries Jurisdiction (United Kingdom v. Iceland)	United Kingdom	Iceland	14 April 1972	25 July 1974	Judgment on Merits
57	Application for Review of Judgment No. 158 of the United Nations Administrative Tribunal	United Nations Administrative Tribunal		3 July 1972	12 July 1973	Opinion on Merits
58	Nuclear Tests Case (Australia v. France)	Australia	France	9 May 1973	20 December 1974	Judgment on Jurisdiction
59	Nuclear Tests Case (New Zealand v. France)	New Zealand	France	9 May 1973	20 December 1974	Judgment on Jurisdiction
60	Trial of Pakistani Prisoners of War	Pakistan	India	11 May 1973	15 December 1973	Discontinued
61	Western Sahara	United Nations General Assembly		21 December 1974	16 October 1975	Opinion on Merits
62	Aegean Sea Continental Shelf Case	Greece	Turkey	10 August 1976	19 December 1978	Judgment on Jurisdiction
63	Continental Shelf (Tunisia/Libyan Arab Jamahiriya)	Libya; Tunisia		1 December 1978	24 February 1982	Judgment on Merits
64	United States Diplomatic and Consular Staff in Tehran	United States	Iran	29 November 1979	24 May 1980	Judgment on Merits
65	Interpretation of the Agreement of 25 March 1951 between the WHO and Egypt	World Health Organization		28 May 1980	20 December 1980	Opinion on Merits
66	Application for Review of Judgment No. 273 of the United Nations Administrative Tribunal	United Nations Administrative Tribunal		28 July 1981	20 July 1982	Opinion on Merits
67	Delimitation of the Maritime Boundary in the Gulf of Maine Area	Canada; United States		25 November 1981	12 October 1984	Judgment on Merits
68	Continental Shelf (Libyan Arab Jamahiriya/Malta)	Libya; Malta		26 July 1982	3 June 1985	Judgment on Merits
69	Frontier Dispute (Burkina Faso/Republic of Mali)	Mali; Upper Volta		16 September 1983	22 December 1986	Judgment on Merits
70	Military and Paramilitary Activities in and Against Nicaragua	Nicaragua	United States	9 April 1984	27 June 1986	Judgment on Merits
71	Application for Revision and Interpretation of the Judgment of 24 February 1982 in the Case concerning the Continental Shelf (Tunisia/Libyan Arab Jamahiriya)	Tunisia	Libya	27 July 1984	10 December 1985	Judgment on Merits
72	Application for Review of Judgment No. 333 of the United Nations Administrative Tribunal	United Nations Administrative Tribunal		10 September 1984	27 May 1987	Opinion on Merits
73	Border and Transborder Armed Actions (Nicaragua v. Costa Rica)	Nicaragua	Costa Rica	28 July 1986	19 August 1987	Discontinued
74	Border and Transborder Armed Actions (Nicaragua v. Honduras)	Nicaragua	Honduras	28 July 1986	20 December 1988	Judgment on Jurisdiction
75	Land, Island and Maritime Frontier Dispute	El Salvador; Honduras		11 December 1986	11 September 1992	Judgment on Merits
75	Land, Island and Maritime Frontier Dispute	Nicaragua (int.)		11 December 1986	11 September 1992	Judgment on Merits
76	Elettronica Sicula S.p.A. (ELSI)	United States	Italy	6 February 1987	20 July 1989	Judgment on Merits
77	Applicability of the Obligation to Arbitrate under Section 21 of the United Nations Headquarters Agreement of 26 June 1947	United Nations General Assembly		7 March 1988	26 April 1988	Opinion on Merits
78	Maritime Delimitation in the Area Between Greenland and Jan Mayen	Denmark	Norway	16 August 1988	14 June 1993	Judgment on Merits
79	Aerial Incident of 3 July 1988	Iran	United States	17 May 1989	22 February 1996	Discontinued
80	Certain Phosphate Lands in Nauru	Nauru	Australia	19 May 1989	13 September 1993	Discontinued
81	Applicability of Article VI, Section 22, of the Convention on the Privileges and Immunities of the United Nations	(UNESCO) United Nations Educational, Scientific and Cultural Organization		13 June 1989	15 December 1989	Opinion on Merits
82	Arbitral Award of 31 July 1989	Guinea-Bissau	Senegal	23 August 1989	12 November 1991	Judgment on Merits
83	Territorial Dispute (Libyan Arab Jamahiriya/Chad)	Chad; Libya		31 August 1990	3 February 1994	Judgment on Merits
84	East Timor	Portugal	Australia	22 February 1991	30 June 1995	Judgment on Jurisdiction
85	Maritime Delimitation between Guinea-Bissau and Senegal	Guinea-Bissau	Senegal	12 March 1991	8 November 1995	Discontinued
86	Passage through the Great Belt	Finland	Denmark	17 May 1991	10 September 1992	Discontinued
87	Maritime Delimitation and Territorial Questions between Qatar and Bahrain	Qatar	Bahrain	8 July 1991	16 March 2001	Judgment on Merits
88	Questions of Interpretation and Application of the 1971 Montreal Convention arising from the Aerial Incident at Lockerbie (Libyan Arab Jamahiriya v. United Kingdom)	Libya	United Kingdom	3 March 1992	10 September 2003	Discontinued
89	Questions of Interpretation and Application of the 1971 Montreal Convention arising from the Aerial Incident at Lockerbie (Libyan Arab Jamahiriya v. United States of America)	Libya	United States	3 March 1992	10 September 2003	Discontinued
90	Oil Platforms (Islamic Republic of Iran v United States of America)	Iran	United States	2 November 1992	6 November 2003	Judgment on Merits
91	Application of the Convention on the Prevention and Punishment of the Crime of Genocide (Bosnia and Herzegovina v. Federal Republic of Yugoslavia)	Bosnia and Herzegovina	Yugoslavia	20 March 1993	26 February 2007	Judgment on Merits
92	Gabčíkovo-Nagymaros Project	Hungary; Slovakia		2 July 1993	–	In progress
93	Legality of the Use by a State of Nuclear Weapons in Armed Conflict	World Health Organization		3 September 1993	8 July 1996	Opinion on Merits
94	Land and Maritime Boundary Between Cameroon and Nigeria	Cameroon	Nigeria	29 March 1996	10 October 2002	Judgment on Merits
94	Land and Maritime Boundary Between Cameroon and Nigeria	Equatorial Guinea (int.)		29 March 1996	10 October 2002	Judgment on Merits
95	Legality of the Threat or Use of Nuclear Weapons	United Nations General Assembly		6 January 1995	8 July 1996	Opinion on Merits
96	Fisheries Jurisdiction (Spain v. Canada)	Spain	Canada	28 March 1995	4 December 1998	Judgment on Jurisdiction
97	Request for an Examination of the Situation in Accordance with Paragraph 63 of the Court's Judgment of 20 December 1974 in the Nuclear Tests	New Zealand	France	21 August 1995	22 September 1995	Dismissed
98	Kasikili/Sedudu Island	Botswana; Namibia		29 May 1996	13 December 1999	Judgment on Merits
99	Vienna Convention on Consular Relations (Paraguay v. United States of America)	Paraguay	United States	3 April 1998	10 November 1998	Discontinued
100	Difference Relating to Immunity from Legal Process of a Special Rapporteur of the Commission on Human Rights	United Nations Economic and Social Council		10 August 1998	29 April 1999	Opinion on Merits
101	Request for Interpretation of the Judgment of 11 June 1998	Nigeria	Cameroon	28 October 1998	25 March 1999	Judgment on Admissibility
102	Sovereignty over Pulau Ligitan and Pulau Sipadan	Indonesia; Malaysia		2 November 1998	17 December 2002	Judgment on Merits
103	Ahmadou Sadio Diallo	Guinea	Democratic Republic of the Congo	28 December 1998	19 June 2012	Judgment on Merits
104	LaGrand	Germany	United States	2 March 1999	27 June 2001	Judgment on Merits
105	Legality of Use of Force (Yugoslavia v. Belgium)	Yugoslavia	Belgium	29 April 1999	15 December 2004	Judgment on Jurisdiction
106	Legality of Use of Force (Yugoslavia v. Canada)	Yugoslavia	Canada	29 April 1999	15 December 2004	Judgment on Jurisdiction
107	Legality of Use of Force (Yugoslavia v. France)	Yugoslavia	France	29 April 1999	15 December 2004	Judgment on Jurisdiction
108	Legality of Use of Force (Yugoslavia v. Germany)	Yugoslavia	Germany	29 April 1999	15 December 2004	Judgment on Jurisdiction
109	Legality of Use of Force (Yugoslavia v. Italy)	Yugoslavia	Italy	29 April 1999	15 December 2004	Judgment on Jurisdiction
110	Legality of Use of Force (Yugoslavia v. Netherlands)	Yugoslavia	Netherlands	29 April 1999	15 December 2004	Judgment on Jurisdiction
111	Legality of Use of Force (Yugoslavia v. Portugal)	Yugoslavia	Portugal	29 April 1999	15 December 2004	Judgment on Jurisdiction
113	Legality of Use of Force (Yugoslavia v. United Kingdom)	Yugoslavia	United Kingdom	29 April 1999	15 December 2004	Judgment on Jurisdiction
112	Legality of Use of Force (Yugoslavia v. Spain)	Yugoslavia	Spain	29 April 1999	2 June 1999	Discontinued
114	Legality of Use of Force (Yugoslavia v. United States of America)	Yugoslavia	United States	29 April 1999	2 June 1999	Discontinued
115	Armed Activities on the Territory of the Congo (Democratic Republic of the Congo v. Burundi)	Democratic Republic of the Congo	Burundi	23 June 1999	30 January 2001	Discontinued
117	Armed Activities on the Territory of the Congo (Democratic Republic of the Congo v. Rwanda)	Democratic Republic of the Congo	Rwanda	23 June 1999	30 January 2001	Discontinued
116	Armed Activities on the Territory of the Congo (Democratic Republic of the Congo v. Uganda)	Democratic Republic of the Congo	Uganda	23 June 1999	9 February 2022	Judgment on Merits
118	Application of the Convention on the Prevention and Punishment of the Crime of Genocide (Croatia v. Serbia)	Croatia	Serbia	2 July 1999	3 February 2015	Judgment on Merits
119	Aerial Incident of 10 August 1999	Pakistan	India	21 September 1999	21 June 2000	Judgment on Jurisdiction
120	Territorial and Maritime Dispute between Nicaragua and Honduras in the Caribbean Sea	Nicaragua	Honduras	8 December 1999	8 October 2007	Judgment on Merits
121	Arrest Warrant of 11 April 2000	Democratic Republic of the Congo	Belgium	17 October 2000	14 February 2002	Judgment on Merits
122	Application for the Revision of the Judgment of 11 July 1996 in the Case concerning Application of the Convention on the Prevention and Punishment of the Crime of Genocide	Yugoslavia	Bosnia and Herzegovina	24 April 2001	3 February 2003	Judgment on Admissibility
123	Certain Property (Liechtenstein v. Germany)	Liechtenstein	Germany	1 June 2001	10 February 2005	Judgment on Jurisdiction
124	Territorial and Maritime Dispute (Nicaragua v. Colombia)	Nicaragua	Colombia	6 December 2001	19 November 2012	Judgment on Merits
125	Frontier Dispute (Benin/Niger)	Benin; Niger		11 April 2002	12 July 2005	Judgment on Merits
126	Armed Activities on the Territory of the Congo (New Application: 2002) (Democratic Republic of the Congo v. Rwanda)	Democratic Republic of the Congo	Rwanda	28 May 2002	3 February 2006	Judgment on Jurisdiction
127	Application for Revision of the Judgment of 11 September 1992 in the Case concerning the Land, Island And Maritime Frontier Dispute	El Salvador	Honduras	10 September 2002	18 December 2003	Judgment on Admissibility
128	Avena and Other Mexican Nationals	Mexico	United States	9 January 2003	31 March 2004	Judgment on Merits
129	Certain Criminal Proceedings in France	Republic of the Congo	France	11 April 2003	16 November 2010	Discontinued
130	Sovereignty over Pedra Branca/Pulau Batu Puteh, Middle Rocks and South Ledge	Malaysia; Singapore		24 July 2003	23 May 2008	Opinion on Merits
131	Legal Consequences of the Construction of a Wall in the Occupied Palestinian Territory	United Nations General Assembly		10 December 2003	7 July 2004	Opinion on Merits
132	Maritime Delimitation in the Black Sea	Romania	Ukraine	16 September 2004	3 February 2009	Judgment on Merits
133	Dispute regarding Navigational and Related Rights	Costa Rica	Nicaragua	29 September 2005	13 July 2009	Judgment on Merits
134	Status vis-à-vis the Host State of a Diplomatic Envoy to the United Nations	Dominica	Switzerland	26 April 2006	9 June 2006	Discontinued
135	Pulp Mills on the River Uruguay	Argentina	Uruguay	4 May 2006	20 April 2010	Judgment on Merits
136	Certain Questions of Mutual Assistance in Criminal Matters	Djibouti	France	9 August 2006	4 June 2008	Judgment on Merrits
137	Maritime Dispute (Peru v. Chile)	Peru	Chile	16 January 2008	27 January 2014	Judgment on Merits
138	Aerial Herbicide Spraying	Ecuador	Colombia	31 March 2008	13 September 2013	Discontinued
139	Request for Interpretation of the Judgment of 31 March 2004 in the Case concerning Avena and Other Mexican Nationals	Mexico	United States	5 June 2008	19 January 2009	Judgment on Merits
140	Application of the International Convention on the Elimination of All Forms of Racial Discrimination	Georgia	Russia	12 August 2008	1 April 2011	Judgment on Jurisdiction
141	Accordance with International Law of the Unilateral Declaration of Independence in Respect of Kosovo	United Nations General Assembly		10 October 2008	22 July 2010	Opinion on Merits
142	Application of the Interim Accord of 13 September 1995	FYROM	Greece	17 November 2008	5 December 2011	Judgment on Merits
143	Jurisdictional Immunities of the State	Germany	Italy	23 December 2008	3 February 2012	Judgment on Merits
143	Jurisdictional Immunities of the State	Greece (int.)		23 December 2008	3 February 2012	Judgment on Merits
144	Questions relating to the Obligation to Prosecute or Extradite	Belgium	Senegal	19 February 2009	20 July 2012	Judgment on Merits
145	Jurisdiction and Enforcement of Judgments in Civil and Commercial Matters	Belgium	Switzerland	21 December 2009	5 April 2011	Discontinued
146	Judgment No.2867 of the Administrative Tribunal of the International Labour Organization	(United Nations) International Fund for Agricultural Development		26 April 2010	1 February 2012	Opinion on Merits
147	Certain questions concerning diplomatic relations	Honduras	Brazil	28 October 2009	12 May 2010	Discontinued
148	Whaling in the Antarctic	Australia	Japan	31 May 2010	31 March 2014	Judgment on Merits
148	Whaling in the Antarctic	New Zealand (int.)		31 May 2010	31 March 2014	Judgment on Merits
149	Frontier Dispute (Burkina Faso/Niger)	Burkina Faso; Niger		21 July 2010	16 April 2013	Judgment on Merits
150	Certain Activities carried out by Nicaragua in the Border Area	Costa Rica	Nicaragua	18 November 2010	2 February 2018	Joined proceedings Judgment on Merits
152	Construction of a Road in Costa Rica along the San Juan River	Nicaragua	Costa Rica	22 December 2011	2 February 2018	Joined proceedings Judgment on Merits
151	Request for Interpretation of Temple of Preah Vihear Case	Cambodia	Thailand	28 April 2011	11 November 2013	Judgment on Merits
153	Obligation to Negotiate Access to the Pacific Ocean	Bolivia	Chile	24 April 2013	1 October 2018	Judgment on Merits
154	Delimitation of the Continental Shelf	Nicaragua	Colombia	16 September 2013	13 July 2023	Judgment on Merits
155	Alleged Violations of Sovereign Rights	Nicaragua	Colombia	27 November 2013	21 April 2022	Judgment on Merits
156	Seizure of Certain Documents and Data	Timor-Leste	Australia	17 December 2013	11 June 2015	Discontinued
157	Maritime Delimitation in the Caribbean Sea and the Pacific Ocean	Costa Rica	Nicaragua	25 February 2014	2 February 2018	Judgment on Merits
158	Obligations concerning Negotiations relating to Cessation of the Nuclear Arms Race and to Nuclear Disarmament (Marshall Islands v. India)	Marshall Islands	India	24 April 2014	5 October 2016	Judgment on Jurisdiction
159	Obligations concerning Negotiations relating to Cessation of the Nuclear Arms Race and to Nuclear Disarmament (Marshall Islands v. Pakistan)	Marshall Islands	Pakistan	24 April 2014	5 October 2016	Judgment on Jurisdiction
160	Obligations concerning Negotiations relating to Cessation of the Nuclear Arms Race and to Nuclear Disarmament (Marshall Islands v. United Kingdom)	Marshall Islands	United Kingdom	24 April 2014	5 October 2016	Judgment on Jurisdiction
161	Maritime Delimitation in the Indian Ocean	Somalia	Kenya	28 August 2014	12 October 2021	Judgment on Merits
162	Dispute over the Status and Use of the Waters of the Silala	Chile	Bolivia	6 June 2016	1 December 2022	Judgment on Merits
163	Immunities and Criminal Proceedings	Equatorial Guinea	France	13 June 2016	11 December 2020	Judgment on Merits
164	Certain Iranian Assets	Iran	United States	14 June 2016	30 March 2023	Judgment on Merits
165	Land Boundary in the Northern Part of Isla Portillos	Costa Rica	Nicaragua	16 January 2017	2 February 2018	Judgment on Merits
166	Application of the International Convention for the Suppression of the Financing of Terrorism and of the International Convention on the Elimination of All Forms of Racial Discrimination	Ukraine	Russia	16 January 2017	31 January 2024	Judgment on Merits
167	Application for revision of the Judgment of 23 May 2008 in the case concerning Sovereignty over Pedra Branca/Pulau Batu Puteh, Middle Rocks and South Ledge (Malaysia/Singapore)	Malaysia	Singapore	2 February 2017	29 May 2018	Discontinued
168	Jadhav	India	Pakistan	15 May 2017	17 July 2019	Judgment on Merits
169	Legal Consequences of the Separation of the Chagos Archipelago from Mauritius in 1965	United Nations General Assembly		23 June 2017	25 February 2019	Opinion on Merits
170	Request for Interpretation of the Judgment of 23 May 2008 in the case concerning Sovereignty over Pedra Branca/Pulau Batu Puteh, Middle Rocks and South Ledge (Malaysia/Singapore)	Malaysia	Singapore	30 June 2017	29 May 2018	Discontinued
171	Arbitral Award of 3 October 1899	Guyana	Venezuela	19 March 2018	–	In progress
172	Application of the International Convention on the Elimination of All Forms of Racial Discrimination (Qatar v. United Arab Emirates)	Qatar	United Arab Emirates	15 June 2018	4 February 2021	Judgment on Jurisdiction
173	Appeal Relating to the Jurisdiction of the ICAO Council under Article 84 of the Convention on International Civil Aviation	Bahrain; Egypt; Saudi Arabia; United Arab Emirates	Qatar	4 July 2018	14 July 2020	Judgment on Merits
174	Appeal Relating to the Jurisdiction of the ICAO Council under Article II, Section 2, of the 1944 International Air Services Transit Agreement	Bahrain; Egypt; United Arab Emirates	Qatar	4 July 2018	14 July 2020	Judgment on Merits
175	Alleged violations of the 1955 Treaty of Amity, Economic Relations, and Consular Rights	Iran	United States	16 July 2018	30 March 2023	Judgment on Merits
176	Relocation of the United States Embassy to Jerusalem	Palestine	United States	28 September 2018	–	In progress
177	Guatemala's Territorial, Insular and Maritime Claim	Belize; Guatemala		7 June 2019	–	In progress
178	Application of the Convention on the Prevention and Punishment of the Crime of Genocide (The Gambia v. Myanmar)	Gambia	Myanmar	11 November 2019	19 November 2026	Judgment on Merits
179	Land and Maritime Delimitation and Sovereignty over Islands	Gabon; Equatorial Guinea		5 March 2021	19 May 2025	Judgment on Merits
180	Application of the International Convention on the Elimination of All Forms of Racial Discrimination	Armenia	Azerbaijan	16 September 2021	–	In progress
181	Application of the International Convention on the Elimination of All Forms of Racial Discrimination	Azerbaijan	Armenia	23 September 2021	–	In progress
182	Allegations of Genocide under the Convention on the Prevention and Punishment of the Crime of Genocide	Ukraine	Russia	26 February 2022	–	In progress
182	Allegations of Genocide under the Convention on the Prevention and Punishment of the Crime of Genocide	32 other states (int.) (Note: Australia, Austria, Belgium, Bulgaria, Canada, Croatia, Cyprus, Czech Republic, Denmark, Estonia, Finland, France, Germany, Greece, Ireland, Italy, Latvia, Liechtenstein, Lithuania, Luxembourg, Malta, Netherlands, New Zealand, Norway, Poland, Portugal, Romania, Slovakia, Slovenia, Spain, Sweden, and the United Kingdom.)		26 February 2022	–	In progress
183	Questions of Jurisdictional Immunities of the State and Measures of Constraint against State-Owned Property	Germany	Italy	29 April 2022	–	In progress
184	Request relating to the Return of Property Confiscated in Criminal Proceedings	Equatorial Guinea	France	29 September 2022	–	In progress
185	Sovereignty over the Sapodilla Cayes	Belize	Honduras	16 November 2022	–	In progress
186	Legal consequences arising from the policies and practices of Israel in the occupied Palestinian territory including East Jerusalem	United Nations General Assembly		19 January 2023	19 July 2024	Opinion on Merits
187	Obligations of States in respect of climate change	United Nations General Assembly		12 April 2023	23 July 2025	Opinion on Merits
188	Application of the Convention against Torture and Other Cruel, Inhuman or Degrading Treatment or Punishment	Canada; Netherlands	Syria	8 June 2023	–	In progress
189	Alleged Violations of State Immunities	Iran	Canada	27 June 2023	–	In progress
190	Aerial Incident of 8 January 2020	Canada; Sweden; Ukraine; United Kingdom	Iran	4 July 2023	–	In progress
191	Right to Strike under ILO Convention No. 87	(United Nations) International Labour Organization		10 November 2023	21 May 2026	Opinion on Merits
192	Application of the Convention on the Prevention and Punishment of the Crime of Genocide in the Gaza Strip	South Africa	Israel	29 December 2023	–	In progress
193	Alleged Breaches of Certain International Obligations in Respect of the Occupied Palestinian Territory	Nicaragua	Germany	1 March 2024	-	In progress
194	Embassy of Mexico in Quito	Mexico	Ecuador	11 April 2024	-	In progress
195	Glas Espinel	Ecuador	Mexico	29 April 2024	-	In progress
196	Obligations of Israel in relation to the Presence and Activities of the United Nations, Other International Organizations and Third States in and in relation to the Occupied Palestinian Territory	United Nations General Assembly		23 December 2024	22 October 2025	Opinion on Merits
197	Application of the Convention on the Prevention and Punishment of the Crime of Genocide in Sudan	Sudan	United Arab Emirates	5 March 2025	5 May 2025	Judgment on Jurisdiction
198	Appeal relating to the Jurisdiction of the ICAO Council under Article 84 of the Convention on International Civil Aviation	Iran	Canada; Sweden; Ukraine; United Kingdom	17 April 2025	-	In progress
199	Kohler and Paris	France	Iran	16 May 2025	19 September 2025	Discontinued
200	Alleged Smuggling of Migrants	Lithuania	Belarus	19 May 2025	-	In progress
201	Appeal from the ICAO Council decision dated 30 June 2025	Russia	Australia; Netherlands	18 September 2025	-	In progress
202	Alleged Violations of Human Rights by Rwanda on the Territory of the Congo	Democratic Republic of the Congo	Rwanda	26 June 2026	-	In progress

== See also ==
- Lists of case law
- United Nations Security Council resolution
