= OAJ =

OAJ may refer to:

- OAJ, the IATA and FAA LID code for Albert J. Ellis Airport, Jacksonville, North Carolina
- United Nations Office of Administration of Justice, an organization established by the United Nations
