= Osla (disambiguation) =

Osla or OSLA may refer to:

- Osła, a village in Poland
- Osla Benning (1921–1974), a Canadian who worked at Bletchley Park during World War II
- Osla Bigknife, a character in Arthurian legend and Welsh mythology
- Office of Staff Legal Assistance, a legal group of the United Nations
