= United Nations Office of Administration of Justice =

United Nations internal justice system

The United Nations Office of Administration of Justice (OAJ) is responsible for coordinating the functions of the internal justice system of the United Nations.

The OAJ became operational on 1 July 2009, replacing an old system that had been in effect for 60 years. A hallmark of this new justice system is that it is independent.

The OAJ is headed by an executive director, who is appointed to the position by the secretary-general. The first executive director of the OAJ was Andrei Terekhov. Alayne Frankson-Wallace became executive director in 2017 and remains in the position as of 2023.

The Office of Staff Legal Assistance, as well as the Registries for the United Nations Dispute Tribunal (UNDT) and the United Nations Appeals Tribunal, are part of the Office of Administration of Justice. With its headquarters in New York City, the OAJ also has a presence — through the UNDT registries and the branch offices of the Office of Staff Legal Assistance — in Geneva, Nairobi, Addis Ababa, and Beirut.
