= Armenian prisoners of the Second Nagorno-Karabakh War =

Armenian prisoners of the Second Nagorno-Karabakh War are servicemen of the Defense Army of the Republic of Artsakh and the Armed Forces of the Republic of Armenia, as well as civilians and other detainees, who surrendered or were forcibly captured by the Azerbaijani Armed Forces during and after the conflict in 2020 between Azerbaijan and the self-proclaimed Republic of Artsakh together with Armenia in the disputed region of Nagorno-Karabakh and surrounding areas.

Azerbaijani forces inhumanely treated numerous ethnic Armenian military personnel, civilians and other detainees, subjected them to physical abuse, torture, humiliation, enforced disappearance, extrajudicial killing and execution. Intentionally killing civilians, intentionally killing prisoners of war, torture, taking hostages, the granting of no quarter despite surrender are all considered war crimes.

The number of Armenian POWs has remained unknown. They were held in degrading conditions of detention. Despite calls for the immediate release of all Armenian POWs, civilians and other detainees by the EU and international organizations, Azerbaijan has filed criminal charges against them. Armenia filed a case against Azerbaijan at the International Court of Justice in September 2021, and the hearings took place in October 2021 in The Hague.

== Background ==
Renewed hostilities between Azerbaijan and Artsakh together with Armenia began on 27 September 2020. Many territories passed under the control of Azerbaijan during the following six weeks which culminated in the capture of the strategically important town Shusha (known also as Shushi) and prompted the two sides to agree to a ceasefire agreement on 9 November 2020. According to the agreement, both belligerent parties agreed to exchange prisoners of war and the dead.

== Abuse and torture ==
On 19 March 2021, Human Rights Watch (HRW) reported that Azerbaijani Armed Forces abused Armenian POWs of the Second Nagorno-Karabakh War. Human Rights Watch called on the Azerbaijani authorities to investigate the cases of ill-treatment and bring those responsible to justice. The organization also called on the Azerbaijani side to "immediately release all remaining POWs" and detained civilians and "provide information on the whereabouts" of military personnel and civilians whose status is unknown.

Human Rights Watch also examined more than 20 videos posted on social media of scenes in which Azerbaijani officers clearly mistreat Armenian POWs.

=== Testimony of POWs ===
==== Human Rights Watch ====
Human Rights Watch interviewed four Armenian POWs who described in detail their mistreatment in detention, as well as the mistreatment of other POWs with whom they were taken prisoner or in the same cell. One of the Armenian POWs said that he was stabbed with a sharp metal rod. In the first days of detention, POWs were given very little water and almost no food.

One of the Armenian POWs, who was 19 years old, said to Human Rights Watch that he was tied up, handcuffed and thrown into the back of the car, face down. an Azerbaijani serviceman burnt his hands with what he described as a "windproof lighter", which was also used to heat up a metal rod and poke him in the back with the rod. the prisoner also told about that effect this abuse had on him and its continuation in the hospital:

Another 20-year-old Armenian POW, who was captured on 20 October 2021 in the Hadrut Province, along with eight other soldiers, was beaten by the Azerbaijani military:

“They started beating us straight away and kept it up for three hours or so. Their commanding officers told them not to. But whenever those officers weren’t around, the beating resumed… They gave a spade to one of ours and told him to go dig his grave. He was so frightened he started digging.”

All three POWs said that they were handcuffed to a radiator and had no mattresses or blankets. They were not given food or water and received no medical attention for their injuries. Azerbaijani officers beat the Armenian POWs with fists, feet and wooden rods.

One of the Armenian POWs said about his detention in Baku that he almost did not sleep there. He would get assaulted and beaten by a group of guards, numbering two to four, as soon as he slept. One of them broke a wooden rod on him, hitting him so badly that he temporarily lost the use of one of his arms. On his fourth day there, he was beaten so badly that two of his ribs broke.

Another 31-year-old Armenian POW detailed their repeated beatings; they were beaten nonstop for one and a half hour, pushed into the ground, punched, and kicked, two or three guards "working" on each of them. once in his cell with another prisoner from his group, guards would come and beat them several times a day. the prisoner stated that they weren't interrogated during their abuse and instead were asked questions like "why did you join fighting".

The four POWs were interrogated by Azerbaijani special services for several weeks. During interrogations, they were all beaten with fists, kicked and hit with truncheons. One of the POWs, Tigran, said that he was twice tortured with electric current. The first time, the torture lasted about 40 minutes, and each time he fainted from pain, he was brought to his senses and given new electric shocks. In the second case, the torture lasted approximately 10 minutes.

The guards went into his cell every day to kick and beat the POWs. Hovhannes said that they were hitting him even in front of the doctor, who changed his bandages, he was beaten every day.

==== Maral Najarian and Viken Euljekjian ====
Maral Najarian and her fiancé Viken Euljekjian were captured on 10 November 2020, on their way to Shushi, unaware that the city had been captured by Azerbaijani Armed Forces. According to Maral, they were handcuffed and searched and their phones, car and passports were confiscated. After two hours of detainment, guards began to beat Euljekjian. Later they were moved to a military prison and then to Baku under the pretext of handing them to the Red Cross, only to be moved to another prison, which Najarian believes to be Gobustan Prison. That was the last time Najarian had seen Euljekjian, bruised and with open wounds on his wrists.

Najarian was released on 10 March 2021, through mediation of the International Committee of the Red Cross. while Euljekjian was sentenced to 20 year in prison in Azerbaijan under the pretence of "terrorism".

=== Videos depicting abuse ===
There are hundreds of videos that depict abuses against Armenian prisoners online, both military and civilian, 35 of whom have been identified through video evidence as of 15 December 2021.

== Execution ==
=== Hadrut Execution ===
On 15 October 2020, a video surfaced of two captured Armenians being executed by Azerbaijani soldiers; Artsakh authorities identified one as a civilian. Bellingcat analysed the videos and concluded that the footage was real and that both executed were Armenian combatants captured by Azerbaijani forces between 9 and 15 October 2020 and later executed. The BBC also investigated the videos and confirmed that the videos were from Hadrut and were filmed some time between 9–15 October 2020. A probe has been launched by Armenia's human rights defender, Arman Tatoyan, who shared the videos with European Court of Human Rights and who will also show the videos to the UN human rights commissioner, the Council of Europe and other international organizations. The U.N. human rights chief, Michelle Bachelet, stated that "in-depth investigations by media organisations into videos that appeared to show Azerbaijani troops summarily executing two captured Armenians in military uniforms uncovered compelling and deeply disturbing information".

=== Others ===
On 10 December, Amnesty International released a report on videos depicting war crimes. In some of these videos, Azerbaijani soldiers were seen decapitating an Armenian soldier as he was alive. In another video, the victim is an older man in civilian clothes who gets his throat cut before the video abruptly ends.

Beheadings of two elderly ethnic Armenian civilians by Azerbaijani armed forces have been identified by The Guardian.

== Repatriation after the war ==
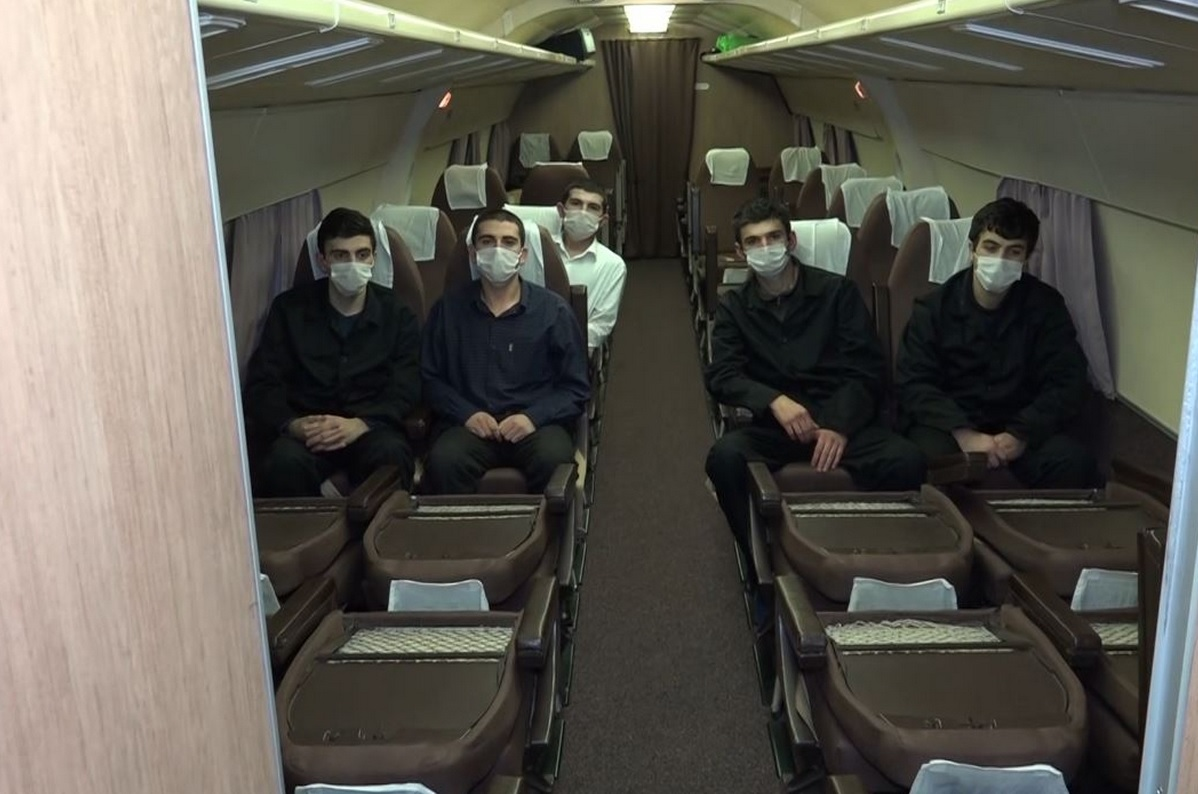
Armenian prisoners of war returning to Yerevan in February 2021. The photo was published by the Ministry of Defense of the Russian Federation.

In December 2020, Armenia and Azerbaijan have begun exchanging groups of prisoners of war mediated by Russia. As of February 2022, 150 prisoners, including civilians, returned to Armenia and Artsakh.

Number of Armenian POWs returned since the signing of the 2020 Nagorno-Karabakh ceasefire agreement (Note: A number of Armenian prisoners of war were captured after the end of the Second Nagorno-Karabakh War.)
Date	Number of POWs	Mediated by	Ref.
October 28, 2020	1	Russia	
December 4, 2020	2	Russia	
December 9, 2020	4	Russia	
December 12, 2020	2	Russia	
December 14, 2020	44	Russia	
December 15, 2020	1	Russia	
December 28, 2020	4	Russia	
January 28, 2021	5	Russia	
February 9, 2021	5	Russia	
March 10, 2021	1 (Note: Maral Najarian)	ICRC	
May 4, 2021	3	Russia	
June 9, 2021	1	Russia	
June 12, 2021	15 (Note: On 12 June 2021, Azerbaijan returned 15 Armenian prisoners of war in exchange for minefield maps in the Agdam District.)	Georgia	
July 3, 2021	15 (Note: On 3 July 2021, Azerbaijan returned 15 Armenian prisoners of war in exchange for minefield maps in Fuzuli and Zangilan districts.)	Russia	
September 7, 2021	2	Russia	
September 9, 2021	2	Russia	
October 6, 2021	1 (Note: On 6 October 2021, Azerbaijan returned 1 Armenian prisoner of war who crossed the Artsakh border on 22 August 2021.)	Russia	
October 19, 2021	5	Russia	
November 26, 2021	2	Russia	
December 4, 2021	10 (Note: On 4 December 2021, Azerbaijan returned 10 Armenian prisoners of war captured on 16 November 2021 in exchange for minefield maps in Nagorno-Karabakh.)	Russia	
December 19, 2021	10	European Union	
December 29, 2021	6	Hungary	
February 7, 2022	8	European Union, France	

== Reactions ==
=== Armenia and Artsakh ===
According to Armenian authorities, as of April 2021, over 200 Armenian POWs were held captive by Azerbaijan.

==== Armenian diaspora ====
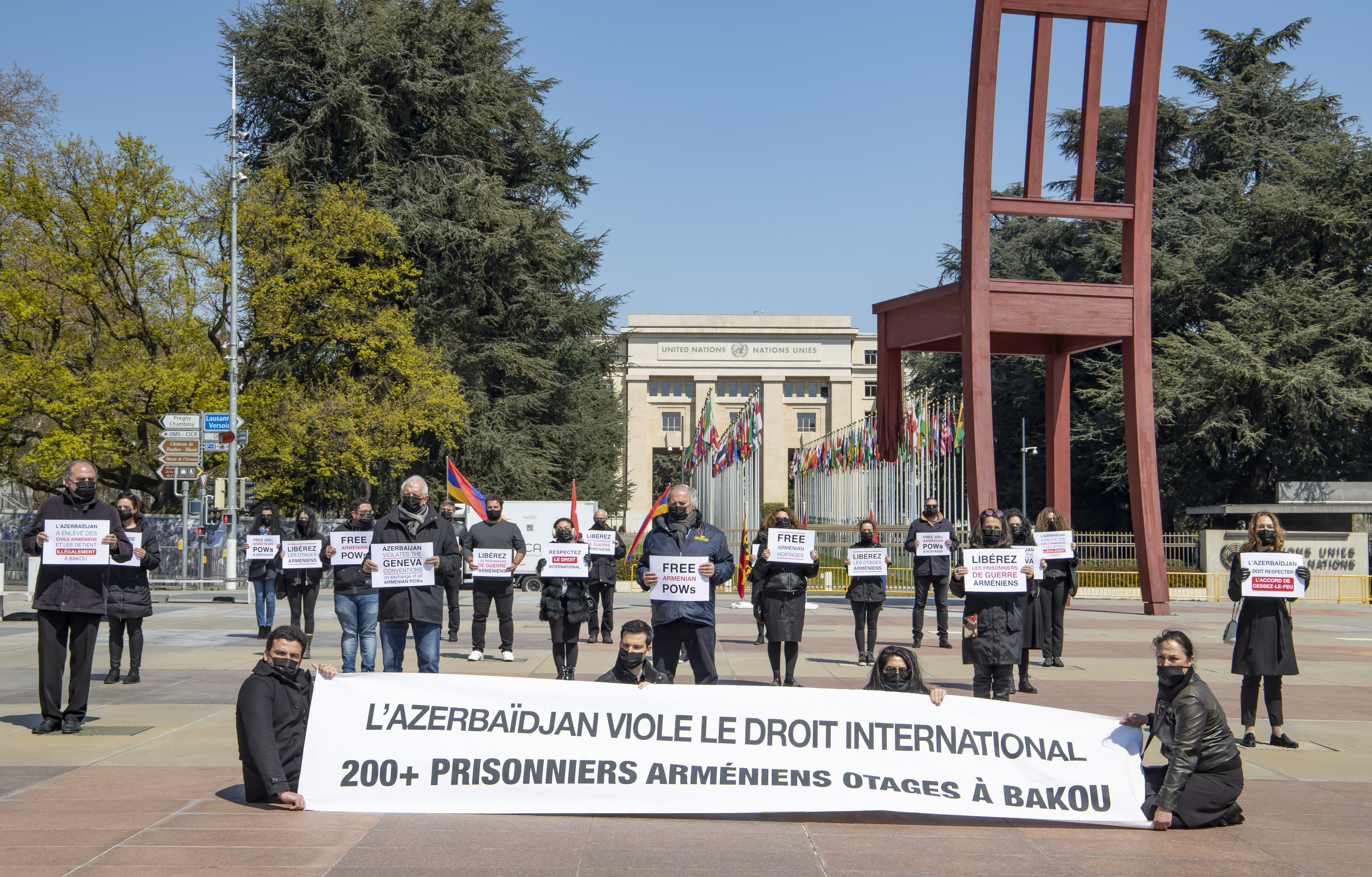
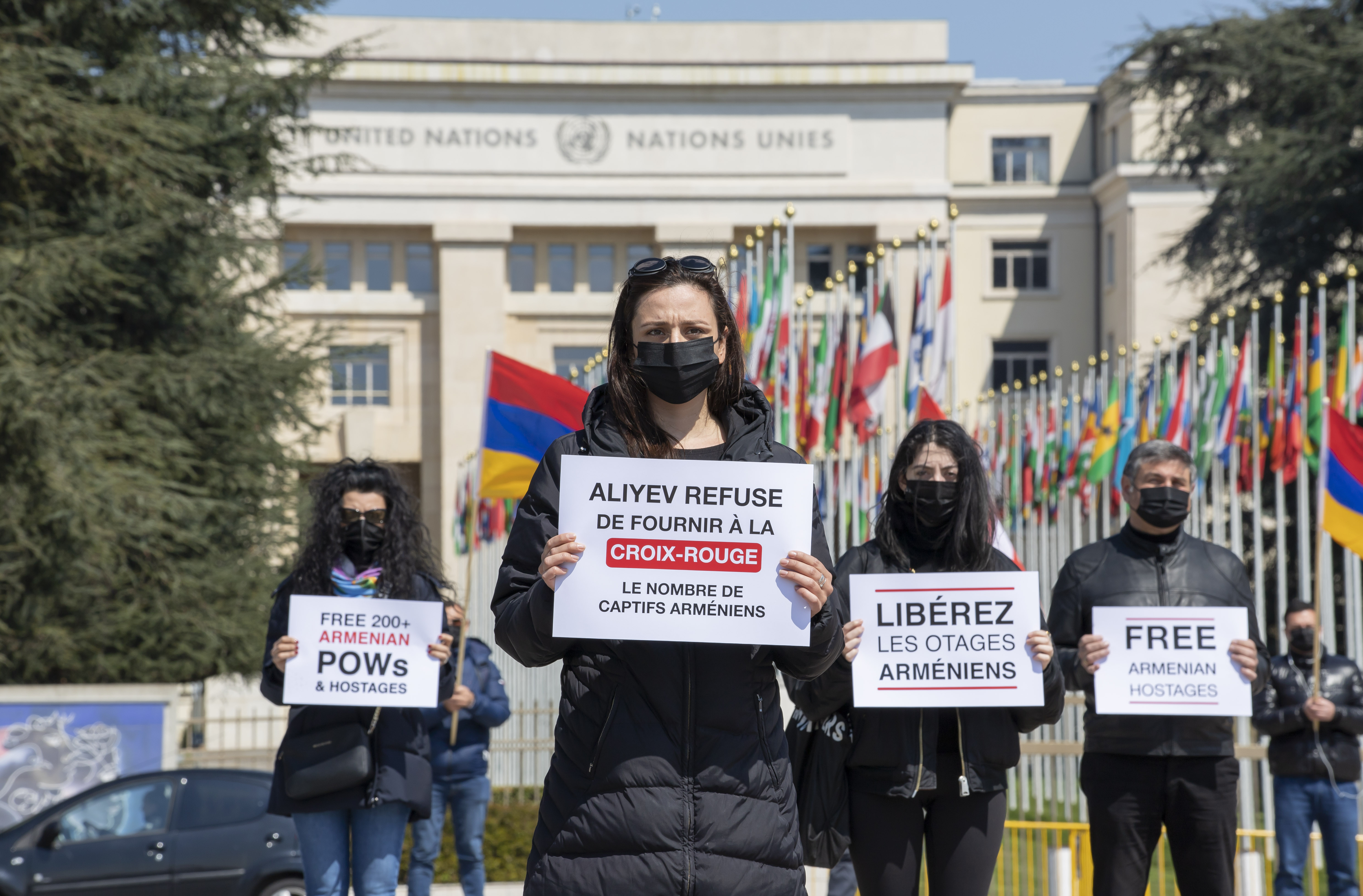
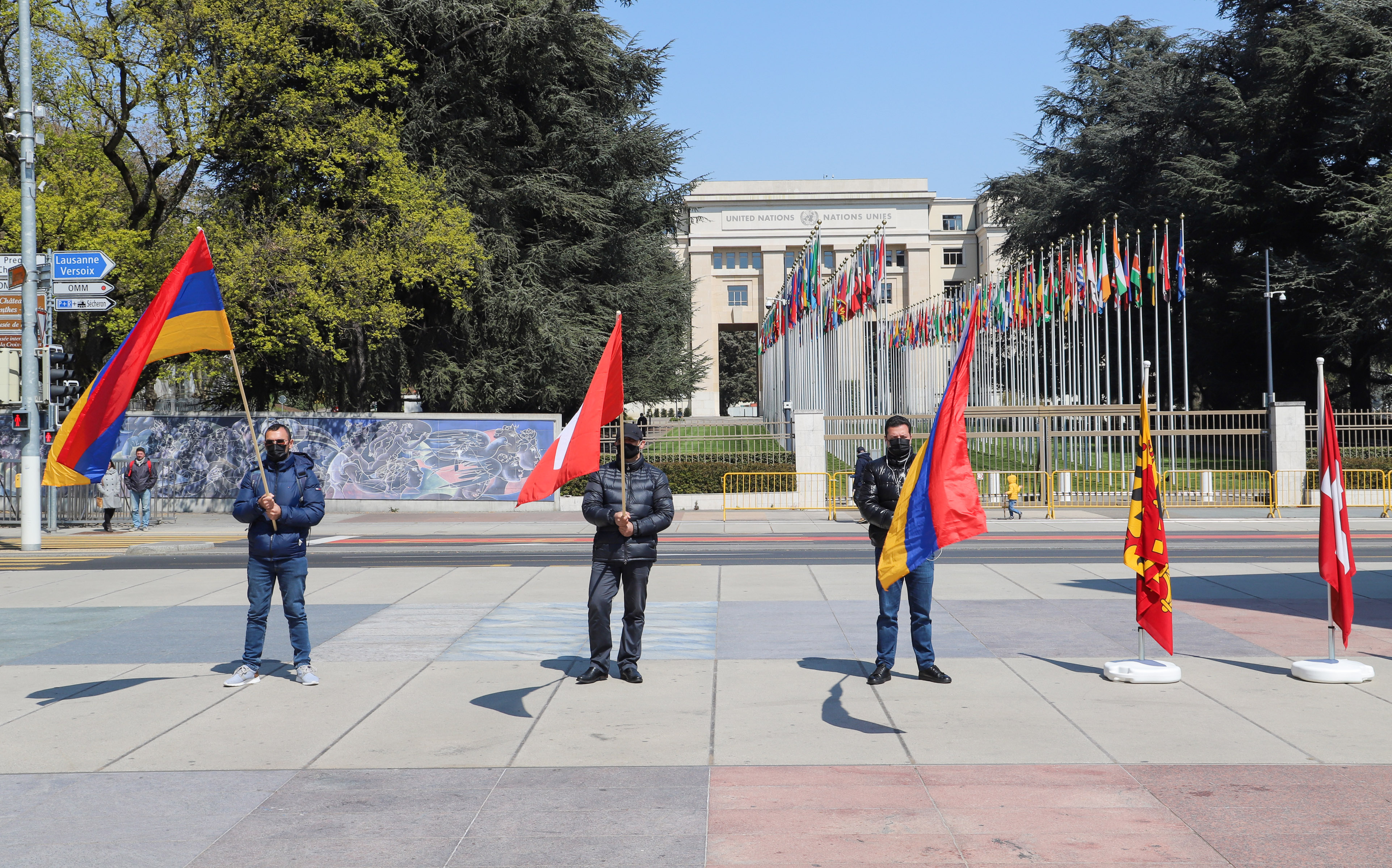
Protesters in Geneva demanding the release of Armenian POWs, 15 April 2021

On 14 April 2021, a global campaign was launched among the Armenian diaspora to demand the release of Armenian POWs and other detainees held in Azerbaijan. Protests were held in 14 cities around the world, including Toronto, Paris, Rome, Houston, Sacramento, Montréal, New York, Los Angeles, Warsaw, Berlin, Hamburg and Moscow.

=== Azerbaijan ===
In Azerbaijan, the detainees are not considered POWs, they are instead accused of various crimes allegedly committed after the ceasefire agreement was signed.

=== International ===
==== Countries ====
- Russia: On 31 August 2021, Russian Foreign Minister Sergey Lavrov called on Azerbaijan to release all Armenian prisoners of war without any additional conditions.
- United States: On 22 September 2021, the U.S. House of Representatives passed an amendment that demanded Azerbaijan's immediate release of about 200 Armenian POWs, hostages and detained persons, drawing attention to Azerbaijan "misrepresenting their status in an attempt to justify their continued captivity".
- Canada: On 7 May 2021, Global Affairs Canada, the department of the Government of Canada, welcomed release of Armenian detainees and "continues to call for the release of all detainees”.
- Luxembourg: On 28 May 2021, The Ministry of Foreign Affairs called on Azerbaijan to immediately release all Armenian prisoners of war.
- Spain: On 11 May 2021, Spanish Members of Parliament and Senators demanded the release Armenian POWs held in Azerbaijan.
- Netherlands: On 27 February 2021, the Dutch Parliament adopted two motions, that also addresses the issue of Armenian POWs still being held in Azerbaijan and called for the release and repatriation of the POWs.

==== OSCE Minsk Group ====
- On 13 April 2021, the OSCE Minsk Group, responsible for mediating the peace process in the Nagorno-Karabakh conflict since 1992, stated that "additional efforts are required to resolve remaining areas of concern and to create an atmosphere of mutual trust conducive to long-lasting peace", including the return of all POWs and other detainees in accordance with the provisions of international humanitarian law.

==== European parliament ====
On 20 May 2021, the European Parliament adopted a resolution urging Azerbaijan to immediately and unconditionally release all the Armenian prisoners, both military and civilian, detained during or after the conflict.

==== OHCHR ====
On 1 February 2021, UN human rights experts called on both sides for the prompt release of POWs and other captives. They were also concerned by allegations that POWs and other protected persons have been subjected to extrajudicial killing, enforced disappearance, torture and other ill-treatment.

==== Organization of American States (OAS) ====
Secretary General of the Organization of American States Luis Almagro has called for the release of all Armenian prisoners of war.

==== Freedom House ====
On 11 May 2021, the human rights organization Freedom House stated it was "deeply concerned by the reports of dehumanizing treatment and abuse, including torture, of Armenians captured and detained by Azerbaijan after the recent armed conflict".

== See also ==
- Prisoner of war
- Detention of Artsakh's military and political leaders
