= Sean D. Wallace =

American judge

Sean Daniel Wallace

United Nations Dispute Tribunal Judge
- In office July 1, 2023 – June 30, 2030
- Appointed by: United Nations General Assembly

Judge, Prince George's County Maryland Circuit Court
- In office 2002–2023

Personal details
- Born: 1960 (age 65–66) Walnut Creek, California
- Education: Hampden-Sydney College (B.A. 1982); University of Maryland School of Law (J.D. 1985)

Sean Daniel Wallace is an American judge who served on Maryland's Circuit Court from 2002 to 2023. He presently (2026) serves as a judge of the United Nations Dispute Tribunal (UNDT), being the first American to become a full-time UNDT judge.

== Judicial service ==
In April 2002, Wallace became an associate judge in the Circuit Court of Prince George's County, Maryland, and served in that role until his retirement in June 2023. He was president of the Maryland Circuit Court Judges Association from 2008 to 2010. During his tenure as a Prince George's County judge, Wallace was designated to hear cases outside of his county to avoid conflicts of interest those other counties' judges may have had in presiding over the local matter.

Nationally, Wallace served as president of the American College of Business Court Judges for its 2013 to 2014 term. From 2010 to 2012 he was as a Business Court Representative to the American Bar Association's Business Law Section.

In 2023, Wallace was elected by the United Nations General Assembly to serve as a judge on the United Nations Dispute Tribunal (UNDT). He became a UNDT president effective June 1, 2024. The UNDT is part of the United Nations' internal justice system for UN systems staff. The UNDT is the first forum for UN systems staff to challenge administrative decisions made by entities subject to UNDT jurisdiction if those persons believe that decision violated their rights. After an extensive selection process, Wallace was chosen to serve a seven-year term (July 1, 2023 - June 30, 2030) as a full-time UNDT judge and is stationed in Nairobi, Kenya, where the UN has a major office. Wallace had experience training judges in Kenya prior to this appointment. He is the first American judge to be appointed to a full-time UNDT judicial position.

== Legal practice ==
Wallace served in a number of positions with the Prince George's County Office of Law. He served as Prince George's County Attorney from 1999 to 2002, deputy county attorney and chief of litigation from 1995 to 1999, and was an associate county attorney from 1988 to 1995. The county attorney is responsible for all of the county government's legal affairs, further serves as a legal advisor to its County Council, County Executive, and other government officials and agencies, and handles all civil litigation involving the county, its officers, and its employees. The county attorney oversees the three divisions of the Office of Law.

Wallace was a member of the Maryland Attorney Grievance Commission's Inquiry Committee from 1986 to 2002. Before that time, from 1985 to 1988, Wallace was an associate attorney with the private law firm Knight, Manzi, Sothoron, Brennan & Ostrom, P.A.

He was president of the Prince George's County Bar Association for its 2002 to 2003 term.

== Education and as educator ==
Wallace received his Bachelor of Arts degree from Hampden-Sydney College in 1982 and his Juris Doctor degree from the University of Maryland School of Law (now the University of Maryland Francis King Carey School of Law) in 1985. He obtained a Senior Executives in State and Local Government Certificate from Harvard University in 2001.

Wallace was an adjunct faculty member of the National College of District Attorneys from 2002 to 2006 and has served as a member of the Judicial Education Advisory Board of the Antonin Scalia Law School, George Mason University, since 2009. He has also taught at the Maryland Judicial College. Wallace has trained judges internationally.

== Positions and honors ==
Wallace has held the following positions or received the following honors, among others, (as listed in the state of Maryland's on-line manual among other sources);

- President, United Nations Dispute Tribunal (2024-)
- President, American College of Business Court Judges (2013–2014)
- President, Maryland Circuit Judges Association (2008–2010)
- President, Prince George's County Bar Association (2002–03)
- Member, Board of Governors, Maryland State Bar Association (2003–05)
- Designated Judge for Advanced Science and Technology Adjudication Resource (ASTAR) Center Program
- Business Court Representative to American Bar Association's Business Law Section (2010–2012)
- Member, Judicial Council's Specialty Courts and Dockets Committee (2015–2020), and chair of its Business & Technology Case Management Subcommittee (2015–20)
- Chair, Complex Litigation Committee, Maryland Conference of Circuit Judges
- Co-chair, Joint Bar Advisory Committee to U.S. District Court of Maryland, Southern Division (1997)
- Co-chair, Government Liability Work Group, Maryland Association of Counties (1995–96)
- Founding member, J. Dudley Digges Inn of Court (1986–1988)
- Vice-chair and member, Board of Directors, Associated Catholic Charities, Archdiocese of Washington
- Board of Directors, SHARE Food Network (2002–07)
- Outstanding Eagle Scout Award, National Eagle Scout Association (2018)
- Special assistant, U.S. Representative Steny H. Hoyer of Maryland, 5th Congressional District (1982)
