= United Nations Administrative Tribunal =

Former UN internal justice system

The United Nations Administrative Tribunal (UNAT) was established by the United Nations General Assembly in 1950 to be the final arbiter over alleged non-observance of contracts of employment and other binding regulations of all staff working in the United Nations Secretariat.

As of 30 June 2009, the mandate of the United Nations Administrative Tribunal has ended. The new internal justice system, United Nations Appeals Tribunal (UNAT), went into effect on 1 July 2009. Please see Office of Administration of Justice for more information.

== Rationale ==
Because the United Nations is not subject to the jurisdiction of any state, it has its internal justice mechanisms for administering civil justice, such as in the domains of entitlements and benefits for staff, other contract issues, disciplinary proceedings, etc. In order to ensure the independence of this organ, it is composed not of officials of the Organization, but of judges appointed by the Member States of the United Nations through the United Nations General Assembly, from which UNAT derives its mandate.

== Other international administrative tribunals and appeals boards ==
- League of Nations Administrative Tribunal
- Administrative Tribunal of the International Labour Organization (also shortened as "ILO Administrative Tribunal" or ILOAT)
- World Bank administrative tribunal
- International Monetary Fund administrative tribunal
- Administrative tribunal of the Council of Europe
- EBRD administrative tribunal
- OAS Administrative Tribunal
- IDB Administrative Tribunal
- European General Court and - for appeals - European Court of Justice (ECJ)
- NATO Appeals Board
- OECD Appeals Board
