= Ambatielos case =

Ambatielos Case
- Court: International Court of Justice
- Full case name: Ambatielos Case (Greece v. United Kingdom)
- Decided: May 19, 1953

Greece v United Kingdom [1952] ICJ 1 (also called the Ambatielos Case) is a public international law case, concerning state responsibility for economic damage. The International Court of Justice held that the UK had to enter into arbitration under the terms of a treaty it had made with Greece, although the ICJ itself held it had no jurisdiction to hear and decide upon the substantive dispute itself.

== Facts ==
A Greek shipowner, Nicolas Eustache Ambatielos, had commissioned nine ships at an agreed price and delivery date from the British government. The British government missed every deadline. The resulting financial losses caused Ambatielos to fail to meet payments, eventually resulting in the reseizure of the already completed ships, ruining Ambatielos, who failed to resolve the matter in UK courts.

On 9 April 1952, Greece took the UK to the International Court of Justice, claiming that the British Board of Trade disregarded British legal protocol by failing to fully disclose to the court the delivery dates promised by the British Government, and the British Court of Appeal disregarded British legal protocol regarding 'fresh evidence' by denying appeal, thus denying Ambatielos adequate legal protection, contrary to international law and the Greco-British Treaty of Commerce and Navigation (1886); and, by declining to enter into an arbitration process with Greece, the UK government was in breach of said treaty and its UN agreements to 'peacefully resolve' international disputes.

== Judgment ==
On 1 July 1952 the ICJ ruled that it had no jurisdiction in the issue of Mr Ambatielos' trial, but had jurisdiction to decide whether or not the UK is obliged to enter into an arbitration process under the Greco-British Treaty of Commerce and Navigation.

On 19 May 1953 it ruled that the UK was obliged to enter into an arbitration process with Greece (which it did, and which was arbitrated in the UK's favour).

== See also ==
- List of International Court of Justice cases
