= Case Concerning Barcelona Traction, Light, and Power Company, Ltd =

International law case between the nations of Belgium and Spain

Barcelona Traction
- Court: International Court of Justice
- Full case name: Case Concerning Barcelona Traction, Light, and Power Co., Ltd (Belgium v. Spain)
- Decided: February 5, 1970
- Citation: [1970]

Court membership
- Judges sitting: José Bustamante y Rivero (President), Vladimir Koretsky (Vice-President), Sir Gerald Fitzmaurice, Kōtarō Tanaka, Philip Jessup, Gaetano Morelli, Luis Padilla Nervo, Isaac Forster, André Gros, Fouad Ammoun, César Bengzon, Sture Petrén, Manfred Lachs, Charles Onyeama, Enrique Armand-Ugón (ad hoc), Willem Riphagen (ad hoc)

Keywords
- Corporations, abuse of rights, corporate veil

Case Concerning Barcelona Traction, Light, and Power Company, Ltd [1970] ICJ 1 is a public international law case, concerning the abuse of rights. The ruling "denies the existence of any general rule of international law or of any special circumstances or considerations of equity which confer a right of diplomatic protection of national shareholders in a foreign company where the acts complained of were directed by authorities of a third state against the company rather than against any legal rights of the shareholders as such."

== Facts ==
Barcelona Traction, Light, and Power Company, Ltd (BTLP) was a corporation incorporated in Canada, with Toronto headquarters, that made and supplied electricity in Spain. It had issued bonds to non-Spanish investors, but during the Spanish Civil War (1936–1939), the Spanish government refused to allow BTLP to transfer currency to pay bondholders the interest that they were due. In 1948, a group of bondholders, fronting for Spanish well-connected businessman Juan March, sued in Spain to declare that BTLP had defaulted on the ground that it had failed to pay the interest. The Spanish court allowed the claim. The business was sold, the surplus distributed to the bondholders, and a small amount was paid to shareholders. The shareholders in Canada succeeded in persuading Canada and other states to complain that Spain had denied justice and violated a series of treaty obligations. However, Canada eventually accepted that Spain had the right to prevent BTLP from transferring currency and to declare BTLP bankrupt. Of the shares, 88% were owned by Belgians. The Belgian government complained, insisting the Spanish government had not acted properly. It made an initial claim at the International Court of Justice in 1958 but later withdrew it to allow negotiations. Subsequent negotiations broke down, and a new claim was filed in 1962. Spain contended that Belgium had no standing because BTLP was a Canadian company.

== Judgment ==
The International Court of Justice held that Belgium had no legal interest in the matter to justify it bringing a claim. Although Belgian shareholders suffered if a wrong was done to the company, it was only the company's rights that could have been infringed by Spain's actions. It would have been direct shareholder rights only (such as to dividends) that were affected, and the state of the shareholders would have an independent right of action. It was a general rule of international law that when an unlawful act was committed against a company, only the state of incorporation of the company could sue, and because Canada had chosen not to do so, that was the end. The idea of a "diplomatic protection" of shareholders was unsound because it would create confusion and insecurity in economic relations as shares are "widely scattered and frequently change hands". The court also decided that a state is bound to give the same legal protection to foreign investments and nationals for natural or legal persons when it admits them to its territory.

Luis Padilla Nervo wrote the following:

The history of the responsibility of States in respect to the treatment of foreign nationals is the history of abuses, illegal interference in the domestic jurisdiction of weaker States, unjust claims, threats and even military aggression under the flag of exercising rights of protection, and the imposing of sanctions in order to oblige a government to make the reparations demanded.

Special agreements to establish arbitral tribunals were on many occasions concluded under pressure, by political, economic or military threats.

The protecting States, in many instances, are more concerned with obtaining financial settlements than with preserving principles. Against the pressure of diplomatic protection, weaker States could do no more than to preserve and defend a principle of international law, while giving way under the guise of accepting friendly settlements, either giving the compensation demanded or by establishing claims commissions which had as a point of departure the acceptance of responsibility for acts or omissions, where the government was, neither in fact nor in law, really responsible.

In the written and in the oral pleadings the Applicant has made reference, in support of his thesis, to arbitral decisions of claims commissions—among others those between Mexico and the United States, 1923.

These decisions do not necessarily give expression to rules of customary international law, as ... the Commissions were authorized to decide these claims "in accordance with principles of international law, justice and equity", and, therefore, may have been influenced by other than strictly legal considerations. ...

Now the evolution of international law has other horizons and its progressive development is more promising, as Rosenne wrote:

There is prevalent in the world today a widespread questioning of the contemporary international law. This feeling is based on the view that for the greater part international law is the product of European imperialism and colonialism and does not take sufficient account of the completely changed pattern of international relations which now exists. ...

Careful scrutiny of the record of the Court may lead to the conclusion that it has been remarkably perceptive of the changing currents of international thought. In this respect it has performed a major service to the international community as a whole, because the need to bring international law into line with present-day requirements and conditions is real and urgent.

The law, in all its aspects, the jurisprudence and the practice of States change as the world and the everyday requirements of international life change, but those responsible for its progressive evolution should take care that their decisions do, in the long run, contribute to the maintenance of peace and security and the betterment of the majority of mankind.

In considering the needs and the good of the international community in our changing world, one must realize that there are more important aspects than those concerned with economic interests and profit making; other legitimate interests of a political and moral nature are at stake and should be considered in judging the behavior and operation of the complex international scope of modern commercial enterprises.

It is not the shareholders in those huge corporations who are in need of diplomatic protection; it is rather the poorer or weaker States, where the investments take place, who need to be protected against encroachment by powerful financial groups, or against unwarranted diplomatic pressure from governments who appear to be always ready to back at any rate their national shareholders, even when they are legally obliged to share the risk of their corporation and follow its fate, or even in case of shareholders who are not or have never been under the limited jurisdiction of the State of residence accused of having violated in respect of them certain fundamental rights concerning the treatment of foreigners. It can be said that, by the mere fact of the existence of certain rules concerning the treatment of foreigners, these have certain fundamental rights that the State of residence cannot violate without incurring international responsibility; but this is not the case of foreign shareholders as such, who may be scattered all over the world and have never been or need not be residents of the respondent State or under its jurisdiction.

In the case of the Rosa Gelbtrunk claim between Salvador and the United States, the President of the arbitration commission expressed a view which may summarize the position of foreigners in a country where they are resident. This view was expressed as follows:

A citizen or subject of one nation who, in the pursuit of commercial enterprise, carries on trade within the territory and under the protection of the sovereignty of a nation other than his own, is to be considered as having cast in his lot with the subjects or citizens of the State in which he resides and carries on business.

"In this case," Schwarzenberger remarks, "the rule was applied to the loss of foreign property in the course of a civil war. The decision touches, however, one aspect of a much wider problem: the existence of international minimum standards, by which, regarding foreigners, territorial jurisdiction is limited." ...

Much has been said about the justification for not leaving the shareholders in those enterprises without protection.

Perhaps modern international business practice has a tendency to be soft and partial towards the powerful and the rich, but no rule of law could be built on such flimsy bases.

Investors who go abroad in search of profits take a risk and go there for better or for worse, not only for better. They should respect the institutions and abide by the national laws of the country where they chose to go.

== Significance ==
The decision is important in public international law because it demonstrates the importance of protections of corporate nationality in nominal ("paper") terms over effective nationality (siège social) where the ownership effectively resides. Unless a principle of law permits a country to espouse a national's claim in the ICJ, there cannot be an espousal.

The case is also important as it demonstrates how the concept of diplomatic protection under international law can apply equally to corporations as to individuals. It also expanded the notion of obligations owed erga omnes (in relation to everyone) in the international community.

== See also ==
- Public international law
- List of International Court of Justice cases
- United States corporate law
