= Asylum case =

1950 International Court of Justice legal case

Asylum Case
- Court: International Court of Justice
- Full case name: Asylum Case (Colombia v. Peru)
- Decided: November 20, 1950

Colombia v Peru [1950] ICJ 6 (also known as the Asylum Case) is a public international law case, decided by the International Court of Justice. The ICJ recognised that the scope of Article 38 of the Statute of the International Court of Justice encompassed bi-lateral and regional international customary norms as well as general customary norms, in much the same way as it encompasses bilateral and multilateral treaties. The Court also clarified that for custom to be definitively proven, it must be continuously and uniformly executed.

== Facts ==
The Colombian Ambassador in Lima, Peru, allowed Víctor Raúl Haya de la Torre, head of the American People's Revolutionary Alliance, sanctuary after his faction lost a one-day civil war in Peru on 3 October 1948. The Colombian government granted him asylum, but the Peruvian government refused to grant him safe passage out of Peru.

Colombia maintained that, according to the Conventions in force—the Bolivian Agreement of 1911 on Extradition, the Havana Convention of 1928 on Asylum, the Montevideo Convention of 1933 on Political Asylum—and according to American International Law, Columbia was entitled to decide if asylum should be granted and its unilateral decision on this was binding on Peru.

== Judgment ==
Both submissions of Colombia were rejected by the Court. The relevant treaties cited by Colombia were not ratified by Peru, and it was not found that the custom of Asylum was uniformly or continuously executed sufficiently to demonstrate that the custom was of a generally applicable character.

== See also ==
- List of International Court of Justice cases
- Right of asylum
