= United Nations Appeals Tribunal =

Appellate court reviewing UN Dispute Tribunal judgments

The United Nations Appeals Tribunal (UNAT), which replaced the former United Nations Administrative Tribunal, is an appellate court of the two-tier justice system of the UN. It was established by the UN General Assembly in December 2008 to review appeals against judgments rendered by the United Nations Dispute Tribunal (UNDT). UNAT, including its registry, is based in New York, and holds sessions in New York City, Geneva and Nairobi, as required by caseload. It held its first session in Geneva in 2010. The UNAT is a component of the UN's Internal Justice System, and is listed as an office, along with UNDT and the Office of the United Nations Ombudsman, under the UN secretariat. The UNAT like the UNDT, is dependent for its administrative, office, staffing, and travel needs including that of the judges, on the UN secretariat.

== Receivability and effect of filing appeal ==
The filing of an appeal has the effect of suspending the execution of the judgement or the contested order. For an appeal to be receivable by the Appeals Tribunal it should be: (a) pursuant to Article 2 of the statute; and (b) filed within 60 calendar days of the receipt of UNDT judgement.

== Competency ==
The UNAT is competent to hear and pass judgement on an appeal filed against a judgement by the United Nations Dispute Tribunal when (a) UNDT exceeded its jurisdiction or competence; (b) failed to exercise jurisdiction vested in it; (c) erred on a question of law; (d) committed an error in procedure, such as to affect the decision of the case; or (e) erred on a question of fact, resulting in a manifestly unreasonable decision. The tribunal may "affirm, reverse, modify or remand the judgement of the Dispute Tribunal". The judgments of UNAT are final and binding on the parties.

== Powers ==
The Appeals Tribunal may order one or both of the following: (a) rescission of the contested administrative decision or ... set an amount of compensation that the respondent may elect to pay as an alternative to the rescission of the contested administrative decision (b) compensation for harm, ... which shall normally not exceed the equivalent of two years' net base salary of the applicant. In exceptional cases it may order the payment of higher compensation for harm".

== Revision of AT judgment ==
Either party may apply to the Appeals Tribunal "for a revision of a judgement on the basis of the discovery of a decisive fact which was, at the time the judgement was rendered, unknown to the Appeals Tribunal and to the party applying for revision." The application for revision is to be submitted within "30 calendar days of the discovery of the fact and within one year of the date of the judgement." In addition either party may apply "for an interpretation of the meaning or scope of the judgement."

== Submission of appeal ==
Appeals are required to be submitted to the registrar on a prescribed form, accompanied by: (a) a brief that explains the legal basis of any of the five grounds for appeal set out in Article 2.1 of the statute relied upon. The registrar after ensuring that the appeal complies with the laid down procedures transmit the appeal to the respondent. If the formal requirements of the article are not fulfilled, the registrar may require the appellant to conform the appeal to the requirements of the article. The form for the appeal is available on the UN AT website.

== Answers, cross-appeals and answers to cross-appeals ==
The respondent's answer is required to be submitted within 60 days of the date on which the respondent received the appeal transmitted by the Registrar, on a prescribed form, along with a brief, not exceeding 15 pages, setting out legal arguments in support of the answer, along with signed original answer form and the annexes. The registrar shall transmit a copy of the answer to the appellant.

The party answering may file a cross-appeal, the appeal within 60 days of notification of the appeal, accompanied by a brief which shall not exceed 15 pages, with the Appeals Tribunal stating the relief sought and the grounds of the cross-appeal.

== Issuance and publication of judgements ==
Judgements are given by panels of three judges are adopted by majority vote, and contain the reasons, facts and law on which they are based. The registrar is responsible for the publication of the judgements of the Appeals Tribunal on the website of the Appeals Tribunal after they are delivered.

== Format and content of documents ==
The UNAT tribunal has laid down that all documents should conform to standard forms issued by the Appeals Tribunal, be page numbered, adhere to the page limit and word count with typeface at 12 points with 1.5 line spacing, and 10 points for footnotes with single line spacing. The maximum permissible word count for each brief, including headings, footnotes and quotations, is 6,750 words for a 15-page brief, 2,250 words for a five-page brief, and 900 words for a two-page brief. Each annex to a filed document must have page numbering.

== Judges of UNAT ==
The tribunal is composed of seven judges. Judges are appointed by the General Assembly on the recommendation of the Internal Justice Council in accordance with General Assembly resolution 62/228. No two judges are of the same nationality, and due regard is given "to geographical distribution and gender balance". The judges normally review appeals in three-member panels as per Article 3.

On 15 November 2022, the General Assembly elected the following judges for a term of office starting on 1 July 2023 and ending on 30 June 2030:

1. Katharine Mary Savage (South Africa)
2. Abdelmohsen Sheha (Egypt)
3. Nassib G. Ziadé (Lebanon/Chili)
4. Leslie Formine Forbang (Cameroon)

The UNAT is currently composed of seven judges elected by the General Assembly:

1. Katharine Mary Savage, president (South Africa)
2. Leslie Formine Forbang, first vice-president (Cameroon)
3. Abdelmohsen Sheha, second vice-president (Egypt)
4. Graeme Colgan (New Zealand)
5. Kanwaldeep Sandhu (Canada)
6. Gao Xiaoli, president (China)
7. Nassib G. Ziadé (Lebanon/Chili)

Former judges who served on the Appeals Tribunal were:

- Rose Boyko (Canada) (1 July 2009 - 15 January 2011)
- Kamaljit Singh Garewal (India) (1 July 2009 - 30 June 2012) first vice-president (1 July 2011 - 30 June 2012) second vice-president (1 July 2010 - 30 June 2011)
- Mark P. Painter (United States) (1 July 2009 - 30 June 2012)
- Jean Courtial (France) (1 July 2009 - 31 December 2013) president (1 July 2010 - 30 June 2011) first vice-president (1 July 2009 - 30 June 2011)
- Inés Weinberg de Roca (Argentina) (1 July 2009-June 2016) president (1 July 2009 – 30 June 2010) first vice-president (1 July 2013-30 June 2014; 1 July 2012-30 June 2013) second vice-president (1 July 2014-30 June 2015)
- Sophia Adinyira (Ghana) (1 July 2009 – 30 June 2016) president (1 July 2011-30 June 2012) first vice-president (1 July 2015-30 June 2016; 1 July 2010-30 June 2011) second vice-president (1 July 2013-30 June 2014; 1 July 2009-30 June 2010)
- Luis María Simón (Uruguay) (1 July 2009 – 30 June 2016) president (1 July 2012-30 June 2013) second vice-president (1 July 2011-30 June 2012)
- Mary Faherty (Ireland) (28 January 2011-30 June 2016) president (1 July 2013-30 June 2014) second vice-president (1 July 2012-30 June 2013)
- Rosalyn M. Chapman (United States) (July 2012 – November 2017) president (1 July 2015-30 June 2016) second vice-president (1 July 2016-November 2017)
- Richard Lussick (Samoa) (July 2012 – June 2019) president (July 2014 – June 2015) first vice-president (July 2016 – December 2017)
- Deborah Thomas-Felix (Trinidad and Tobago) (December 2014 - June 2019) president (July 2016 – December 2017) second vice-president (July 2015 – June 2016)
- Jean-François Neven (Belgium) (1 July 2019 – 10 January 2022)
- John Raymond Murphy (South Africa) (1 July 2016 – 30 June 2023)
- Dimitrios Raikos (Greece) (1 July 2016 – 30 June 2023)
- Sabine Knierim (Germany) (1 July 2016 – 30 June 2023)
- Martha Halfeld Furtado de Mendonca Schmidt (Brazil) (1 July 2016 – 30 June 2023)

== Registry ==
The United Nations Appeals Tribunal Registry is located in New York. It is headed by a registrar, a P 5 level UN-paid lawyer. The registrar is assisted by one P 3 legal officer and two general service administrative assistants. In addition, the registry is supported by legal research and information technology officers, and staff. The UNAT Registry provides technical and administrative support to the UNAT judges including by "enforcing parties" compliance with the UNAT rules of procedure.

== UNAT activity 2013: Outcome of appeals by UN staff members ==
Statistically UN staff members have a low chance of getting favorable outcomes from appeals to the UNAT. In 2013 out of 115 judgments by UNAT 99 were against appeals on UNDT judgements. Out of the 99 appeals, 61 were filed by staff members, of which 72 percent (44) were rejected. In contrast, out of the 38 appeals filed by the UN Secretary-General against staff members, 31 or 82 percent were granted in full or in part.

=== OSLA ===
In 2013, 52 staff members chose to be self-represented either because they did not have faith in Office of Staff Legal Assistance (OSLA) or OSLA was not forthcoming in assisting them through the appeal process. Only 32 staff members were extended OSLA assistance in the UNAT appeal process.

== See also ==
- United Nations Dispute Tribunal
- Office of Staff Legal Assistance
