= United Nations Dispute Tribunal =

UN internal justice court

- Established: 2009
- Location: New York City, Geneva, Nairobi
- Website: https://www.un.org/en/internaljustice/undt/

President
- Currently: Sean D. Wallace

The United Nations Dispute Tribunal (UNDT) is the court of first instance in the internal justice system of the United Nations. It became operational on 1 July 2009. The UNDT "hears and decides cases" filed by current and former staff members "appealing administrative decisions alleged to be in non-compliance with their terms of appointment or contract of employment". The staff members as well as the administration have a "right to appeal the judgments of the UNDT to the United Nations Appeals Tribunal (UNAT)". In order to ensure the independence of this organ, it is composed not of officials of the organization, but by judges appointed by the member states of the United Nations through the General Assembly, from which UNDT derives its mandate.

== Procedures ==
As a first step in the formal system, a staff member who wishes to contest an administrative decision will have to request a management evaluation. When no resolution through informal means can be arrived at, and when the result of the management evaluation is not to the satisfaction of the staff member, the staff member can file an application to the United Nations Dispute Tribunal.

The UN Dispute Tribunal examines the facts of the case, and conducts, where necessary, oral proceedings. These proceedings are normally held in public. Cases before the Dispute Tribunal are usually considered by a single judge, but in cases that are particularly complex or important, a three-judge panel may be convened. The judgments of the Dispute Tribunal are binding. The full text of the Statute of the UN Dispute Tribunal is contained in the annex to General Assembly resolution A/RES/63/253.

== UNDT registries ==
UN Dispute Tribunal has registries in New York City, Geneva and Nairobi. The geographical coverage of these is as follows:

- New York Registry: Applications from staff assigned in duty stations not covered by the Geneva and Nairobi Registries, including the Caribbean, Central and Eastern Asia (including Afghanistan, India, Kazakhstan, Pakistan, Turkmenistan and Uzbekistan), North America, South America or the Pacific.
- Geneva Registry: Applications from staff assigned in duty stations located in Europe or part of Western Asia (including Armenia, Azerbaijan, Georgia, Russia and Turkey)
- Nairobi Registry: Applications from staff assigned in duty stations located in Africa, the Arabian Peninsula (including Bahrain, Kuwait, Oman, Qatar, Saudi Arabia, the United Arab Emirates and Yemen), Iran, Iraq, Israel, Jordan, Lebanon, Syria, as well as Palestine.

== Records of Dispute Tribunal ==
Parties to the proceedings, i.e., the applicant and the respondent, have full access to all Judicial records which are defined as "Case-related materials which form part of the official case record of the tribunal as kept by the Registry, including, but not limited to, filings made by parties in the cases, issuances of the tribunal, transcripts, audio and video recordings of hearings and exhibits admitted in the cases." The custodian of the records of the Dispute Tribunal is the Registry. Access to audio-visual recordings of oral proceedings, is subject to "the need to protect personal data", and are granted, usually through electronic means, on a written request addressed to the registrar.

== Relative rank and power of judges ==
The judges in the tribunal are given an administrative rank, and protocol status, which is below Assistant Secretary General. The relatively low rank of judges, according to the New York Times, makes those higher in the UN hierarchy feel that it is "beneath them" to answer to the tribunal. As indicated on Article 4(12) of the statute of the Dispute Tribunal, the judges of the Dispute Tribunal shall be considered officials other than secretariat officials under the Convention on the Privileges and Immunities of the United Nations. Judges do not have the power to declare people who do not do their bidding in contempt of court, and are thus dependent on the UN Secretariat to act in good faith in its dealings with the tribunal. Judge Michael F. Adams, an Australian judge, at the end of his tenure in the tribunal commenting on accountability in UN system observed "Someone in the position of Under Secretary General is never confronted with the requirement that particular questions be answered." There have been cases in which the orders of the judge to produce documents and witnesses, have been ignored by the United Nations. The United Nations response to the tribunal has, its critics argue, been contradictory, even hypocritical, in view of the organizations standing as the international guardian and promoter of rule of law. George Irving, a former lawyer with over 30 years of experience in the UN Justice system, said, "The organization has to decide from the S.G. on down whether this is an organization that respects the rule of law or not".

== UNDT judges ==
The UN Dispute Tribunal operates on a full-time basis. The UNDT was composed of "three full-time Judges, two half-time Judges and three ad litem judges". The Judges are appointed by the General Assembly. The resolution of the General Assembly adopted on 22 December 2018 changed the system. From July 2019, there are no longer ad litem judges, but only three full-time judges and six half-time judges. All of them have a seven years term. The current composition of the tribunal is as follows:

=== Full-time judges ===
- New York: Adina Elvira Ghita (Romania) – seven-year term from July 1, 2026
- Nairobi: Judge Sean Daniel Wallace (United States of America) – seven-year term from July 2023
- Geneva: Judge Xiangzhuang Sun (China) – seven-year term from July 2023

=== Half-time judges ===
- Judge Francis H.V Belle (Barbados), a seven-year term from July 10, 2019
- Judge Francesco Buffa (Italy), a seven-year term from July 1, 2019
- Judge Eleanor Donaldson-Honeywell (Trinidad and Tobago), a seven-year term from July 10, 2019
- Judge Rachel Sophie Sikwese (Malawi), a seven-year term from July 10, 2019
- Judge Margaret Tibulya (Uganda), a seven-year term from July 10, 2019
- Judge Solomon Areda Waktolla (Ethiopia), a seven-year term from July 1, 2023

The current president of the tribunal is Judge Xiangzhuang Sun

== Former UNDT judges ==
1. Judge Agnieszka Klonowiecka-Milart (Poland) – from July 1, 2016 to June 30, 2023

2. Judge Teresa Maria da Silva Bravo (Portugal) – from July 1, 2016 to June 30, 2023

3. Judge Alexander W. Hunter Jr. (United States of America) – from July 1, 2016 to June 30, 2023

== See also ==
- United Nations Appeals Tribunal
- Office of Staff Legal Assistance (OSLA)

== Other international administrative tribunals ==
- Administrative Tribunal of the International Labour Organization
- Administrative tribunal, World Bank
- Administrative Tribunal, African Development Bank
- Administrative tribunal, International Monetary Fund
- Administrative tribunal, Council of Europe
- Administrative tribunal, EBRD
