= Namibia exception =

1971 International Court of Justice opinion

The Namibia exception identifies the advisory opinion issued on 21 June 1971 by the International Court of Justice (ICJ), the principal judicial organ of the United Nations (UN). The opinion refers to the "Legal Consequences for States of the Continued Presence of South Africa in Namibia (South West Africa) notwithstanding Security Council Resolution 276 (1970)".

The term means that although states, whether UN members or not, are required to disregard legal rights granted under illegal or unrecognised governments, this non-recognition requirement does not apply (exception) to certain basic human rights granted to inhabitants of these territories. For instance, an ambassador of such territory must not be granted diplomatic immunity abroad while a birth certificate issued by an illegal authority should be accepted.

Another way to explain would be "even acts that are undertaken under an unlawful regime may be recognized internationally, if they benefit the local population (the Namibia exception). Applied to unlawful occupation, this might mean that the consequences of illegality might be different in relation to different actions of the occupant, in light of their effects on the local population."

The Namibia exception has become standard jurisprudence when legal remedies are indicated to identify differences between the jurisdiction if any are from an illegal government, and the inhabitants of the territory that are being governed. Issues arising from the independence declarations of Northern Cyprus and the Kosovo, and the current Russian invasion of Ukraine are examples of its more general application.

== History ==
The first appearance of the term Namibia exception is not documented. The choice of words for the simplification is based on two major aspects in the Advisory Opinion: Namibia was the country involved in the dispute, and the exception was issued by the court to refer to United Nations Security Council Resolution 276.

The Request for Advisory Opinion (including the dossier of documents transmitted to the Court) was filed in the International Court of Justice (ICJ) on 5 August 1970 by the third Secretary-General of the United Nations, U Thant, after resolution 284 (1970) was raised on the 1550th meeting of the Security Council of the United Nations on 29 July 1970.

The Summary of the Advisory Opinion was published by the court on 21 June 1971. It was communicated to the Press by the Registry of the International Court of Justice on the same day.

== Advisory opinion ==
The resolution was intended to clarify the reports made by the Sub-Committee established by the Security Council. The document was intended to be delivered to the Court.

The case for Namibia exception has as the litigant, the South African mandate and the legal procedures that the General Assembly decided. On 27 October 1966, the Mandate for South West Africa was terminated and South Africa was notified that it had no right to administer the Territory. Under the decision, the South African mandate had its title revoked in accordance with the Article 43 of The Hague Regulations and Article 64 of the Fourth Geneva Convention. With its refusal to withdraw from the mandate, the occupation of Namibia was then designated an "illegal occupation". This change caused irreparable damage to the people of Namibia who were under constant risk of being questioned from so-called officials holding government positions as part of the illegal regime.

The International Court of Justice (ICJ) understood that citizens of the territory could not be considered to have rights under the illegal government.

"the principle ex injuria jus non oritur which dictates that acts that are contrary to international law cannot have legal jurisdiction by the wrongdoer… To grant recognition of illegal acts will allow them to perpetuate and then only benefit the state which has acted illegally"

The Advisory Opinion was then issued to underline the basic human rights for the inhabitants of the territory based on birth, marriage, and death certification.

== Applications outside Namibia ==
The Namibia exception has become standard jurisprudence when legal remedies are indicated to identify differences between the jurisdiction if any are from an illegal government, and the inhabitants of the territory that are being governed.

For the situation of Turkish Cypriots in the Turkish Republic of Northern Cyprus (TRNC), Turkish lawyer Deniz Unsal has argued that a Namibia exception should apply to TRNC-granted export certificates for agricultural goods.

Namibian exceptions are actively promoted by Ukrainian courts through case-law as indicated by the European Court of Human Rights (Loizidou v. Turkey, 18.12.1996, §45, Cyprus v. Turkey, 10.05.2001, §§ 92, 96, Mozer v. the Republic of Moldova and Russia, 23.02.2016, §142). According to Article 17, 2006, of the Ukrainian law “On the Enforcement of Judgments and the Application of the Case-Law of the European Court of Human Rights”, the courts shall apply case-law as indicated as a source of law.

== See also ==
- Rule of law
- International law
- List of International Court of Justice cases
