= Schwarzenberg =

Schwarzenberg may refer to:

== People ==
- House of Schwarzenberg, Franconian and Bohemian aristocratic family which was first mentioned in 1172
  - Karl Philipp, Prince of Schwarzenberg (1771–1820), Field Marshal in Austrian service during the Napoleonic Wars
  - Prince Felix of Schwarzenberg (1800–1852), Austrian statesman
  - Adolph Schwarzenberg (1890–1950)
  - Karel VI. Schwarzenberg (1911-1986)
  - Karel Schwarzenberg, (1937–2023), former Minister of Foreign Affairs of the Czech Republic (2007–2009), candidate in presidential election in 2013

== Places ==
=== In Austria ===
- Schwarzenberg, Austria, a village in Bregenzerwald in Vorarlberg
- Schwarzenberg am Böhmerwald, Upper Austria

=== In Germany ===
- Schwarzenberg, Saxony, a town in Saxony
- Aue-Schwarzenberg, a district in Saxony
- Schwarzenberg (Schömberg), a part of Schömberg im Schwarzwald, Baden-Württemberg
- A part of Baiersbronn, in the Black Forest
- Barony of Schwarzenberg, a domain around Schwarzenberg/Erzgeb. in Saxony

=== In Switzerland ===
- Schwarzenberg, Switzerland, in the Canton of Lucerne
- A part of Le Noirmont in the Canton of Jura

== Castles and palaces ==
- Schwarzenberg Castle (Saxony) in Schwarzenberg, Saxony
- Schwarzenberg Castle (Bavaria) in Scheinfeld, Bavaria
- Palais Schwarzenberg in Vienna, Austria
- Palais Schwarzenberg, former residence of the House of Schwarzenberg in Prague, Czech Republic

== Mountains ==
- Schwarzenberg (Breidenbacher Grund), Hesse, Germany
- A mountain that is part of Langenberg, a mountain in the Rhön Mountains
- A mountain with the elevation of 413 m in Westlausitzer Bergland, see Elstra

== Other ==
- The Free Republic of Schwarzenberg, a short-lived de facto independent country after the German capitulation
- Schwarzenberg, a 1984 novel about the Free Republic, by Stefan Heym

== See also ==
- Schwarzenberger
- Schwarzenburg, a municipality in the district of Bern-Mittelland in the canton of Bern in Switzerland
- Schwarzburg, a municipality in Thuringia, Germany
