= United Nations Security Council Resolution 276 =

UN Security Council Resolution 276
- Date: January 30 1970
- Meeting no.: 1,529
- Code: S/RES/276 (Document)
- Subject: The Situation in Namibia
- Voting summary: 13 voted for; None voted against; 2 abstained
- Result: Adopted

Security Council composition
- Permanent members: China; France; Soviet Union; United Kingdom; United States
- Non-permanent members: Burundi; Colombia; Finland; Nepal; Poland; Spain; Syria; Zambia

United Nations Security Council Resolution 276, adopted on January 30, 1970, after reaffirming previous resolutions and statements, the Council condemned South Africa's continued occupation of Namibia as illegal and decided to establish an ad hoc sub-committee to study the ways and means by which the Council's resolutions could be implemented. The Council requested all states and organizations give the sub-committee all the information and other assistance it may require and further requested the Secretary-General to give every assistance to the sub-committee.

The Council decided to resume consideration of the question of Namibia as soon as the recommendations of the sub-committee have been made available.

The resolution was adopted with 13 votes; France and the United Kingdom abstained.

An advisory opinion concerning Resolution 276, issued on 21 June 1971 by the International Court of Justice (I.C.J), gave rise to the term Namibia exception.

== See also ==
- History of Namibia
- List of United Nations Security Council Resolutions 201 to 300 (1965–1971)
- South West Africa

== Sources ==
- Text of the Resolution at undocs.org
