= Maritime Delimitation in the Indian Ocean (Somalia v. Kenya) =

2021 International Court of Justice case

- Court: International Court of Justice
- Decided: 12 October 2021

Maritime Delimitation in the Indian Ocean (Somalia v. Kenya) was a 2021 judgment of the International Court of Justice.

== Judgment ==
On 2 February 2017, the International Court of Justice (ICJ) handed down its Judgment on Preliminary Objections in the case concerning Maritime Delimitation in the Indian Ocean (Somalia v. Kenya). The applicant, Somalia, had requested the Court to delimit its single maritime boundary with neighbouring Kenya. Favouring a negotiated outcome over adjudication, the respondent challenged the jurisdiction of the Court and the admissibility of the application. By a clear majority, the ICJ rejected all objections thereby paving the way to the merits phase of the case, which was concluded by the Court’s judgment on the merits of 12 October 2021.

Hearings on the merits, originally scheduled for September 2019, were delayed at Kenya's request and despite Somalia’s objections. These hearings were then further delayed as a consequence of the COVID-19 pandemic but were finally held in hybrid format from 15–18 March 2021.

== Reception ==
In response, the foreign ministry of Kenya issued a statement that it does not recognise the judgement.

== See also ==
- List of International Court of Justice cases
- Kenya–Somalia relations
