= Agnieszka Klonowiecka-Milart =

Polish judge

- Born: 15 March 1959 (age 67)
- Citizenship: Poland
- Education: Maria Curie-Skłodowska University
- Occupation: judge
- Employer(s): Judge of the United Nations Dispute Tribunal (2016–2023), Khmer Rouge Tribunal (2010–), Supreme Court of Kosovo (2000–2008)
- Spouse: Paweł Milart

Agnieszka Klonowiecka-Milart (born 15 March 1959) is a Polish judge and member of the United Nations Dispute Tribunal. She was formerly a judge of the Khmer Rouge Tribunal and Supreme Court of Kosovo.

== Career ==
Klonowiecka-Milart graduated from law at the Maria Curie-Skłodowska University (1982). Between 1982 and 1991 she worked there as a lecturer, specializing in criminal law, criminal procedure and human rights law. Following her work as an associate judge at the District Court in Opole Lubelskie since 1991, in 1994 she became judge of the District Court in Lublin. Two years later, she was promoted to the Provincial Court in Lublin. She was twice seconded for half a year to the Department of International Cooperation and European Law, Ministry of Justice (1995, 1997). Between 1998 and 2000 she has been working at the United Nations Mission in Bosnia and Herzegovina. From 2000 to 2008, she served as a United Nations international judge in the Kosovo Supreme Court. In 2006, she became an international judge with the Extraordinary Chamber in the Courts of Cambodia, serving initially on an ad hoc basis and since 2010 on a permanent basis in the Supreme Court Chamber. On 1 July 2016 she started her seven-year term as a full-time judge of the UNDT in Nairobi.

== Personal life ==
She is married to physician Paweł Milart. They have a son, Paweł.
