= Ukraine v. Russian Federation (2017) =

Case at the International Court of Justice

Application of the International Convention for the Suppression of the Financing of Terrorism and of the International Convention on the Elimination of All Forms of Racial Discrimination (Ukraine v. Russian Federation)
- Court: International Court of Justice
- Citation: General List No. 166

Court membership
- Judges sitting: Abdulqawi Yusuf (President); Xue Hanqin (Vice-President); Ronny Abraham; Mohamed Bennouna; Antônio Augusto Cançado Trindade; Joan Donoghue; Giorgio Gaja; Julia Sebutinde; Dalveer Bhandari; Patrick Lipton Robinson; James Crawford; Nawaf Salam; Yuji Iwasawa; Peter Tomka; Fausto Pocar (ad hoc); Leonid Skotnikov (ad hoc)

The case Application of the International Convention for the Suppression of the Financing of Terrorism and of the International Convention on the Elimination of All Forms of Racial Discrimination (Ukraine v. Russian Federation) is a case in the International Court of Justice (ICJ). On January 16, 2017, a representative of Ukraine filed a lawsuit at the International Court of Justice to hold the Russian Federation liable for committing acts of "terrorism" and discrimination against Ukraine. The lawsuit alleges violations of the Terrorist Financing Convention and International Convention on the Elimination of All Forms of Racial Discrimination.

== Judgment ==
On March 6, 2017, hearings began on Ukraine's application for preventive measures, which lasted until March 9. Preventive measures will allow the Court to prevent the deterioration of the situation and to protect the civilian population for the length of time necessary to hear the case. Consideration of the merits of the claim will continue regardless of the Court's ruling on the request for the application of preventive measures.

On April 19, 2017, a precautionary decision was announced. The International Court of Justice in The Hague ruled that Russia should refrain from imposing restrictions on the Mejlis of the Crimean Tatar People and allow it to resume its activities. The ICJ denied Ukraine approval of provisional measures against Russia on prohibition of terrorist financing.

On November 8, 2019, the court found that it has jurisdiction to hear the case on the basis of anti-terrorism and anti-discrimination treaties over Russia's alleged support for separatists in Crimea and Eastern Ukraine. Also the ICJ rejected Moscow's call on preliminary objections.

== Verdict ==
Regarding violations of the Terrorist Financing Convention, the court ruled that only financial funding is a subject of the Convention, therefore supply of weapons and ammunition is left out of the case entirely. The court concluded that Ukraine did not provide enough evidence that Russia knew that its financial funds would be used with the intention of committing acts of terrorism; therefore Russia was not obliged to satisfy Ukraine's demands of extradition of people who were accused of financing terrorists on the territory of Ukraine, nor was it obliged to assist Ukraine in investigating alleged funding of terrorism. Nevertheless, Russia was still obliged to conduct an investigation of its own of crimes related to the financing of terrorism by people who were on the territory of Russian Federation; it failed to do so, despite the fact that Ukraine repeatedly requested it, therefore violating the Convention.

Regarding violations of the International Convention on the Elimination of All Forms of Racial Discrimination, the court ruled that enough evidence was provided that steep and systematic decline in providing education in Ukrainian language in Crimea was artificially enforced by the Russian Federation with intent to harm Ukrainian ethnicity in the region, dismissing Russia's accusations that alleged lack of interest was the reason behind the decline, confirming the existence of a pattern of ethnic discrimination and thus finding Russia guilty of violating the Convention. At the same time, the court deemed Ukraine failed to provide enough evidence that the ban of the Mejlis, persecution of its members and other Crimean Tatar and Ukrainian activists and repeated ban to conduct a peaceful assembly were ethnically motivated, though the court recognized that Ukraine could not provide additional evidence because it does not have access to Crimea, and therefore refers to the reports of international organizations. Based on those, it concludes that their political activity and views were the reason behind their persecution rather than their ethnicity, therefore it does not violate the Convention. At the same time the court acknowledged that its verdict from 2017, in which it ordered Russia to lift the ban of Mejlis, has been left unfulfilled.
