= Gabon v. Equatorial Guinea =

Gabon v. Equatorial Guinea, officially Land and Maritime Delimitation and Sovereignty over Islands was a court case involving a territorial dispute between Gabon and Equatorial Guinea that was decided by the International Court of Justice on 19 May 2025. The Court ruled almost unanimously in favour of Equatorial Guinea and granted it sovereignty over three disputed islands in Corisco Bay. It rejected Gabon’s claims based on a disputed 1974 agreement. This decision comes after a long five-decade struggle, which was heightened by the potential presence of significant hydrocarbon reserves in the surrounding areas.

The ruling sets an important precedent regarding the international law treaty validation standards, specifically regarding documentary evidence and the distinction between the mere presence of a treaty and being legally binding. The Court ruled that the Treaty of Paris, 1900, was valid and not the alleged ‘Bata Convention’ of 1974 because there was insufficient evidence of any mutual intent for it to be legally binding.

== Background ==
The dispute dates back to the signing of the Treaty of Paris in 1900 between France and Spain, delimiting the borders of the erstwhile Spanish Guinea and French Gabon. This Treaty granted France pre-emptive rights to seize Spanish territories if Spain abandoned them.

Prior to the 1900 Convention, the area had simultaneous colonising claims made by Spain, France, and Germany. Spain asserted sovereignty over Corisco Island via the 1843 Declaration of Corisco and follow-up treaties with the native captains. Germany ceded land south of the Campo River to France in 1885, and thus prior French and Spanish interests in the area did exist. The Franco-Spanish Mixed Commission (1886-1891) tried to settle such border claims, with France proposing to abandon claims over Corisco and the Elobey Islands in return for pre-emptive rights in case Spain sold them.

Such precarious nature of the colonial boundaries was drawn without regard for the local population or any realities, creating lasting ambiguities that only survived independence because of the principle of uti possidetis juris, whereby the newly independent states inherited colonial boundaries.

The contemporary dispute began when the Gabonese military occupied Mbanié island from the Equatorial Guinean soldiers in August 1972. This transformed a dormant boundary issue of the colonisers into an active five-decade-long territorial conflict.

The negotiations had since attempted to establish a common maritime boundary, but tensions escalated when both countries issued competing claims over the disputed islands. The Bata Convention resulted from these negotiations; however, its validity became the focal point in the subsequent case before the ICJ.

The dispute reached the ICJ after almost two decades of bilateral exchanges and multiple mediation efforts by the United Nations between 2003 and 2016. They negotiated a Special Agreement and concluded it on 15 November 2016 in Marrakesh.

The UN tried to formally mediate the issue under multiple mediators, including Yves Fortier, Nicolas Michel, and Jeffrey Feltman. It continued unsuccessfully until the Special Agreement brought this issue to the ICJ. The dispute went ahead through standard written proceedings and was followed by a week of oral hearings from 30 September to 4 October 2024. Either party raised no preliminary objections, and no interim measures were requested since both countries had agreed to the jurisdiction of the ICJ through the Special Agreement.

== Legal issues and arguments ==
The paramount issue was determining which treaties and conventions had the force of law between these two countries. It was important since it concerned the delimitation of their common land and maritime boundaries and sovereignty over the islands of Conga, Cocotiers/Cocoteros, and Mbanié/Mbañe.

The dispute was centred on these three islands and included the surrounding maritime areas, potentially containing significant hydrocarbon reserves.

The dispute the ICJ had to solve was to determine the legal validity of two conflicting conventions:

1. Paris Convention, 1900 – Recognised by both, it was the Treaty signed between Spain and France delimiting their colonial loot.

2. ‘Bata Convention’, 1974 – Recognised by Gabon and disputed by Equatorial Guinea, it was an alleged agreement between the independent states.

Gabon's main argument was that the Bata Convention of 1974 was valid and confirmed its sovereignty over the three disputed islands; hence, its 1972 military occupation of Mbanié was only an exercise of its legitimate sovereign rights.

Equatorial Guinea, however, disputed the Bata Convention and argued that it lacked legal validity. There was a clear inherited title of the three islands from Spanish colonial sovereignty through the Paris Convention, hence making Gabon’s military occupation of 1972 an illegal use of force.

== Arguments of the parties ==
Equatorial Guinea argued that Spain acquired legal title to the disputed islands through colonial possession, treaties with local powers, and effective administration since 1843. Traditionally, the islands were "dependencies" of Corisco Island, its title automatically following from Spain's sovereignty over Corisco. They also argued that France formally recognised Spain's title before the Franco-Spanish Mixed Commission (1886-1891), where France admitted that “Baynia [Mbanié/Mbañe]” was a geographical dependency of Corisco. Spain's title was confirmed by the 1778 Treaty of El Pardo with Portugal and ongoing Spanish presence, including the 1843 Declaration of Corisco, the 1846 Record of Annexation, and later administrative acts. Equatorial Guinea accused Gabon of invading and occupying Mbanié/Mbañe by force illegally in August 1972, notwithstanding its earlier recognition of Spanish sovereignty.

Gabon based its claim of sovereignty over the islands in question on the purported 1974 "Bata Convention" as the decisive document of law. They argued that there was no proof that the islands were treated as "dependencies" of Corisco by the colonial powers, observing that the Spanish expression "sus dependencias" was vague and that proximity does not imply title under International Law. Gabon argued that Spain's historical documents were unilateral acts that were incapable of conferring a valid legal title, and argued that the 1778 Treaty of El Pardo could not be applied since it referred only to Fernando Póo and Annobón. The 1900 Convention did not refer to the three islands in question, thereby leaving the question of sovereignty in abeyance. Gabon pointed out that both colonial powers had made competing claims, attesting to the contentious nature of sovereignty, and described its actions in 1972 as legitimate police actions to safeguard the interests of nationals and fishermen.

== Judgement ==
The Court ruled decisively in favour of Equatorial Guinea on all major issues and delivered its judgement on 19 May 2025.

=== Key holdings ===
Rejection of the Bata Convention, 1974 (14-1 majority) – The Court ruled that the disputed ‘Bata Convention’ did not have the force of law between the parties. Their reasoning was based on several inconsistencies, such as the lack of an original signed document and only photocopies of the Treaty, the lack of proper authentication, and the lack of uniform treatment by both parties over the last thirty years.

Sovereignty of the Islands – The Court ruled that Equatorial Guinea has a valid title to the islands of Conga, Cocotiers/Cocoteros, and Mbanié/Mbañe because it inherited them under the Paris Convention from Spanish colonisers. They reasoned that Spain’s authority over these islands was uncontested and continuous. France also accepted it before and after 1900, and Gabon after 1960.

Determination of Legal Framework (Unanimous) – The Court also ruled that the Paris Convention holds the valid land boundary delimitation title. It was decided so since maritime delimitation comes under the United Nations Convention on the Law of the Sea (1982).

The Court applied Vienna Convention principles to distinguish between treaty existence and legal binding force, emphasising the importance of mutual intent to be bound. The Court relied on the uti possidetis juris principle for issues of colonial succession, recognising that post-colonial African states inherit colonial boundaries to prevent territorial chaos.

== Implementation and aftermath ==
The ruling requires Gabon to end its fifty-three-year-old occupation of the disputed islands and withdraw any military personnel there.

Gabon’s President Brice Clotaire Oligui Nguema acknowledged the ruling and called for ‘constructive discussions’ with Equatorial Guinea. Despite Gabon’s defeat, a call for continued bilateral cooperation was emphasised by both Governments. Their memberships in the Central African Economic and Monetary Community provide a framework for such cooperation. The ruling also does not bar either country from entering into new treaties.

=== Broader implications ===
The ruling established stricter standards for evidence like treaties, requiring countries to present original documents and show a clear mutual intent to be bound by such documents. Yet it also reaffirmed the supremacy of a colonial-period legal tool and challenged the decolonisation of international law. Although Judge Yusuf criticised this continued reliance in his separate opinion and argued that such principles are “obsolete and problematic”, the practical difficulty of abandoning uti possidetis juris was also acknowledged due to the risk of “untold chaos” in formerly colonised territories.

The peaceful resolution of the conflict proves the strength of international legal structures in the settlement of border conflicts. The decision may encourage other countries with similar disputes to resolve them similarly.

The ruling also grants Equatorial Guinea access to a region that might have significant barrels of recoverable oil, when both countries face declining hydrocarbon production and similar economic challenges.
