= Schwarzenberger =

Schwarzenberger is a German surname. Notable people with the surname include:

- Reinhard Schwarzenberger (born 1977), Austrian ski jumper
- Rolph Ludwig Edward Schwarzenberger (1936–1992), British mathematician
- Xaver Schwarzenberger (born 1946), Austrian cameraman and editor
- Charles Maurice Schwartzenberger, founder of the Thalia Theater
- Ildikó Schwarczenberger (Tordasi) (1951–2015), Hungarian woman-fencer

== See also ==
- Schwarzenberg (disambiguation)
