= Republic of Armenia v. Republic of Azerbaijan =

Application of the International Convention on the Elimination of All Forms of Racial Discrimination (Armenia v. Azerbaijan)
- Court: International Court of Justice

Application of the International Convention on the Elimination of All Forms of Racial Discrimination (Armenia v. Azerbaijan) is a court case at The International Court of Justice (ICJ), the principal judicial organ of the United Nations. The public hearings were held on the request for the indication of provisional measures submitted by the Republic of Armenia in the case concerning application of the International Convention on the Elimination of All Forms of Racial Discrimination on Thursday 14 and Friday 15 October 2021, at The Hague Peace Palace – the seat of the Court.

== Charge ==
Armenia has called on the tribunal to take provisional measures "as a matter of extreme urgency" in order to "protect and preserve Armenia's rights and the rights of Armenians from further harm, and to prevent the aggravation or extension of this dispute" until the court determines the merits of the allegations. Some notable claims made against Azerbaijan by Armenia in this case are:

- "Armenians have been subjected to systemic discrimination, mass killings, torture, and other abuse."
- "These violations are directed at individuals of Armenian ethnic or national origin regardless of their actual nationality."
- "These practices once again came to the fore in September 2020, after Azerbaijan's aggression against Nagorno-Karabakh and Armenia".
- "During that armed conflict, Azerbaijan committed grave violations of the International Convention on the Elimination of All Forms of Racial Discrimination (CERD)".
- "Even after the end of hostilities, following a cease-fire which entered into effect on November 10, 2020, Azerbaijan has continued to engage in the murder, torture, and other abuse of Armenian prisoners of war, hostages, and other detained persons."
- "All good-faith efforts by Armenia to put an end to Azerbaijan’s violations of the CERD through other means failed"
- "Azerbaijan orchestrated a blockade of the only road connecting the 120,000 ethnic Armenians in Nagorno-Karabakh with the outside world, thereby preventing anyone and anything from entering or exiting” with "no signs that it will be lifted any time soon.”

== Interim measure ==
On 22 February 2023, the court reached a legally binding ruling after a 13–2 vote, thereby satisfying one of Armenia's requests and ordered Azerbaijan to "take all measures at its disposal to ensure unimpeded movement of persons, vehicles and cargo along the Lachin corridor in both directions". On the same day the court unanimously rejected the counterclaim filed by Azerbaijan, requesting for provisional measures against Armenia on alleged transportation and placing of mines.

== Officials ==
Armenia is represented by a lawyer and ex-deputy minister of justice of Armenia, Yeghishe Kirakosyan and Azerbaijan is represented by Azerbaijan's deputy foreign minister, Elnur Mammadov. Judge Joan E. Donoghue presides over the case.

== Reactions ==
Armenia's claim was followed by Azerbaijan's counterclaim which accused Armenia of violating the same treaty. Hearings on the Azerbaijani case were held on 23 September 2021, a week after Armenia's case.
