= Office of Staff Legal Assistance =

The UN General Assembly in December 2008 authorized the establishment of the Office of Staff Legal Assistance (OSLA) to strengthen "professional legal assistance for staff" to succeed the Panel of Counsel. OSLA has offices in New York, Addis Ababa, Beirut, Geneva and Nairobi.

== OSLA Staff ==
OSLA has permanent staff consisting of 10: Chief of Unit (P-5), one Legal Officer (P3), one Legal Officer (P-2) and three Legal Assistants (General Service) in New York, and one Legal Officer(P-3) each in Addis Ababa, Beirut, Geneva and Nairobi. In addition it employs lawyers paid for by contributions by staff members. The OSLA staff is expected to regulate the "activity of internal and external individuals providing legal assistance to staff to ensure their independence and impartiality"

== Responsibilities ==
OSLA is expected to provide legal assistance to staff, including summary legal advice; advice and representation during informal dispute resolution including formal mediation; assistance with the management evaluation review and during the disciplinary process; and representation of staff before the Dispute and Appeals Tribunals.

== Cases by OSLA ==
=== UNDT-UNAT ===
During 2013, OSLA represented staff members in the UNDT in 71, and 34 out of the 125 cases of appeal judged by UNAT.

=== Cases in UNDT handled by OSLA by country ===
The highest number of cases by nationality that OSLA represented in 2013 were: US 41; Russian Federation 29; Kenya 19: United Kingdom 12; France 11; Liberia 13; Germany and China 10 each. Amongst the larger countries the fewest cases overseen by OSLA were from India and Brazil had just 1.

=== Cases by gender ===
In 2013, OSLA handled 448 cases from male staff members and 314 from female staff members, about 41 and 59 percent respectively.
