= Obligations of States in respect of climate change =

Advisory opinion from the ICJ

- Court: International Court of Justice
- Full case name: Obligations of States in respect of climate change (Request for Advisory Opinion)
- Started: 2023
- Decided: July 23, 2025
- Transcript: Opinion

Court membership
- Judges sitting: Yuji Iwasawa (president); Julia Sebutinde (vicepresident); Peter Tomka; Ronny Abraham; Abdulqawi Ahmed Yusuf; Xue Hanqin; Dalveer Bhandari; Georg Nolte; Hilary Charlesworth; Leonardo Nemer Caldeira Brant; Juan Manuel Gómez Robledo; Sarah Cleveland; Bogdan Aurescu; Dire Tladi

Case opinions
- Concurrence: Sebutinde, Tomka, Yusuf, Xue, Bhandari, Cleveland, Nolte, Charlesworth, Aurescu, Tladi

Keywords
- Climate change

Obligations of States in respect of climate change is an advisory opinion brought before the International Court of Justice (ICJ), the principal judicial organ of the United Nations, following General Assembly resolution 77/276 adopted on March 29, 2023. In that resolution the General Assembly requested the Court to issue an advisory opinion clarifying the legal obligations of States, under international law, to protect the climate system and other parts of the environment from anthropogenic greenhouse gas emissions. The request also sought clarification on the legal consequences under these obligations for States whose actions or omissions have contributed to such emissions and caused harm to the climate and environment, particularly with respect to small island developing States.

In its opinion, the Court acknowledged that climate change represents an "existential threat" requiring responses not only in legal terms but also in social, political, scientific, and ethical dimensions. It affirmed that States have both treaty-based and customary international law obligations to protect the climate system and the environment from anthropogenic greenhouse gas emissions. The Court held that a failure to meet these obligations constitutes an internationally wrongful act, triggering State responsibility. This responsibility may involve halting harmful conduct, providing assurances of non-repetition, and offering full reparation for the harm caused whether through restitution, compensation, or satisfaction provided there is clear and direct causation between the act and the damage.

The Court's decision reflects a growing reliance on international law to confront the climate crisis, alongside similar proceedings at the International Tribunal for the Law of the Sea and the Inter-American Court of Human Rights. The Inter-American Court of Human Rights issued weeks prior an advisory opinion declaring that the planet is undergoing a climate emergency and that signatory States of the American Convention on Human Rights (Pact of San José) have international legal obligations to address it.

Public hearings on the ICJ's advisory opinion request were held from December 2 to 13, 2024, with participation from 96 States and 11 international organizations. During the written phase of the process, 91 submissions and 62 written comments were filed, marking the highest level of participation in the history of the ICJ and its predecessor, the Permanent Court of International Justice.

This marks the twenty-ninth time the ICJ has issued an advisory opinion. It is also the fifth time in the Court's 80-year history that such a decision was adopted unanimously.

The advisory opinion is not legally binding, but due to the scope, ambition and unanimity of the opinion and by acting as an authoritative interpretation of the relevant legal norms, legal scholars expect that the opinion is likely to used legal proceedings at the international and domestic levels.

== Background ==
In September 2021, the Republic of Vanuatu announced its intention to pursue an advisory opinion from the International Court of Justice regarding States obligations in the face of climate change. The initiative was driven by the youth-led group Pacific Island Students Fighting Climate Change, made up of students from Pacific island nations, including Solomon Yeo, Cynthia Houniuhi, Caleb Pollard, and Belyndar Rikimani. Vanuatu was represented by Julian Aguon. Vanuatu's government argued that such an opinion was necessary due to the particular vulnerability of its territory and that of other small island developing States, as well as the urgent need to strengthen international climate action.

To advance the initiative, Vanuatu formed a core group of United Nations member States to build support within the General Assembly. Deliberations within the group led to the drafting of a resolution, which was submitted on March 1, 2023, under the symbol A/77/L.58 during the General Assembly's seventy-seventh session. The draft resolution was introduced by 108 States and entities, with Vanuatu’s Prime Minister, Alatoi Ishmael Kalsakau, playing a leading role.

The draft bypassed the usual referral process to a main committee. On March 29, 2023, the General Assembly adopted Resolution A/RES/77/276 by consensus, without a vote. In total, 132 States co-sponsored the proposal. The resolution drew upon key provisions of the United Nations Charter, international human rights instruments (including the Universal Declaration of Human Rights and the International Covenant on Civil and Political Rights), as well as climate change treaties (including the Paris Agreement). It also referenced principles of international environmental law, such as the duty to prevent significant environmental harm and the obligation to protect and preserve the marine environment.

The request was formally transmitted to the Court by the UN Secretary-General through a letter dated April 12, 2023.

== Questions from the UN General Assembly ==
The UN General Assembly approved on March 29 a request for the ICJ to respond to the following questions:

Having particular regard to the Charter of the United Nations, the International Covenant on Civil and Political Rights, the International Covenant on Economic, Social and Cultural Rights, the United Nations Framework Convention on Climate Change, the Paris Agreement, the United Nations Convention on the Law of the Sea, the duty of due diligence, the rights recognized in the Universal Declaration of Human Rights, the principle of prevention of significant harm to the environment and the duty to protect and preserve the marine environment,

(a) What are the obligations of States under international law to ensure the protection of the climate system and other parts of the environment from anthropogenic emissions of greenhouse gases for States and for present and future generations;

(b) What are the legal consequences under these obligations for States where they, by their acts and omissions, have caused significant harm to the climate system and other parts of the environment, with respect to: (i) States, including, in particular, small island developing States, which due to their geographical circumstances and level of development, are injured or specially affected by or are particularly vulnerable to the adverse effects of climate change? (ii) Peoples and individuals of the present and future generations affected by the adverse effects of climate change?

— UNGA, A/RES/77/276

== Advisory opinion ==
In its unanimous opinion the International Court of Justice outlined the legal consequences for States whose actions or omissions have caused significant harm to the climate system and other parts of the environment. The Court stated that climate treaties such as the Paris Agreement, the UN Framework Convention on Climate Change (UNFCCC), and the Kyoto Protocol, alongside customary international law, establish obligations whose breach can lead to international responsibility. Chief among these is the duty to prevent significant environmental harm.

After reviewing key mechanisms in the climate regime, including Articles 8 and 15 of the Paris Agreement and Article 14 of the UNFCCC, the Court concluded that these do not replace general rules on State responsibility, as they do not expressly or implicitly exclude their application. The Court acknowledged challenges unique to the climate context, such as the difficulty of attributing responsibility due to the cumulative and transboundary nature of greenhouse gas emissions. Nonetheless, it affirmed that a State's acts or omissions, including a failure to adequately regulate emission-producing activities, can be attributed to that State under international law. It further noted that the existence of multiple responsible States does not prevent an injured State from invoking the responsibility of one or more of them.

Regarding causation, the Court reaffirmed the applicability of the "clear and direct causal link" standard between the wrongful act and the damage. It found that this standard can be adapted to the climate context through case-by-case assessments grounded in scientific evidence. The Court held that obligations to protect the climate system are of an erga omnes and erga omnes partes nature, since the climate is a global common good. Therefore, any State, even one not directly affected, may invoke the responsibility of another State for relevant breaches.

The legal consequences of internationally wrongful acts include:

Ongoing duty of compliance
International obligations continue to apply, even after a breach.
Obligation to cease the wrongful act and ensure non-repetition
This includes repealing or amending domestic measures that conflict with international obligations.
Duty to provide reparation
This may take the form of restitution, financial compensation, or symbolic satisfaction, depending on the case, as long as a sufficient causal link between the act and the damage can be established.

Before delivering the operative part of its opinion, the International Court of Justice emphasized that, while the case was unique due to its global scope, the Court's role remained strictly legal. It stressed that the questions posed by the General Assembly were of a legal nature and that its duty as a judicial body was to respond within the framework of international law. Nevertheless, the Court acknowledged that climate change is an "existential threat" requiring responses not only from the legal realm, but also from social, political, scientific, and ethical perspectives, and it expressed hope that its conclusions would help guide global action in addressing the climate crisis.

The operative part of the opinion was as follows:

- Unanimously, the Court found that it had jurisdiction and decided to issue the requested advisory opinion.
- Unanimously, the Court held that climate treaties, including the UNFCCC, the Kyoto Protocol, and the Paris Agreement, establish binding legal obligations. These include adopting mitigation and adaptation measures, submitting nationally determined contributions (NDCs), acting in accordance with the principle of common but differentiated responsibilities, and cooperating in good faith.
- Unanimously, the Court found that customary international law imposes on all States the duty to prevent significant harm to the climate and environment, and to cooperate in preventing such harm.
- Unanimously, related environmental treaties such as the Vienna Convention and Montreal Protocol, the Convention on Biological Diversity, and the Convention to Combat Desertification also impose relevant obligations to protect the climate.
- Unanimously, States parties to the United Nations Convention on the Law of the Sea (UNCLOS) must take measures to preserve the marine environment, including with regard to climate change, and cooperate in good faith.
- Unanimously, international human rights law obliges States to protect human rights by safeguarding the climate and the environment.
- Unanimously, a breach of the obligations identified constitutes an internationally wrongful act that engages State responsibility.

The consequences of such breaches may include:

- Cessation of wrongful acts or omissions, if they are ongoing.
- Guarantees of non-repetition, where circumstances require.
- Full reparation, through restitution, compensation, or satisfaction, provided the general conditions of international law are met, including the existence of a clear and direct causal link between the act and the harm.

The opinion was signed by the president of the Court, Yuji Iwasawa, and the registrar, Philippe Gautier. The decision was accompanied by separate opinions, declarations, and joint declarations from several judges.

== Bibliography ==
- International Court of Justice (2025-07-23). "Obligations of States in respect of climate change" (PDF). International Court of Justice.
