= Julian Aguon =

Chamorro author and human rights attorney (born 1982)

- Born: May 28, 1982 (age 44); Guam
- Education: Gonzaga University, William S. Richardson School of Law
- Occupation: Human rights attorney

Julian Aguon (born May 28, 1982) is a Chamorro attorney and author from Guam. He founded a solo legal practice in 2010 and launched his own firm, Blue Ocean Law, in 2014. He represented Vanuatu in the International Court of Justice proceedings that led to the advisory opinion known as the Obligations of States in respect of climate change. He was named to the Time100 Next in 2026. He has written four books, and was a finalist for the Pulitzer Prize for Commentary in 2022 for his essay To Hell With Drowning. He is also a recipient of the Right Livelihood Award.

== Biography ==
Aguon was born on May 28, 1982, in Guam to a plumber and a social worker, and was an active reader from a young age. He attended Simon Sanchez High School, before attending Gonzaga University in Spokane, where he spent much of his time with members of the Native American community. He attended the William S. Richardson School of Law in Hawaii, which he graduated from in 2009. He has stated the experience that led him to go into human rights law was a military buildup on Guam in 2005.

== Legal career ==
After law school, he clerked for the Supreme Court of Guam, before deciding to found his own law firm. He took the bar in Guam, the Marshall Islands, and Palau in preparation before opening up his firm in Hagåtña in 2010. In 2014, he expanded it to become known as Blue Ocean Law. The firm focuses on Indigenous rights and culture. He served as the Dan and Maggie Inouye Distinguished Chair in Democratic Ideals at the University of Hawai'i at Manoa in 2024.

Some notable cases he has worked on include habitat designation for species in Guam, deep-sea mining in Fiji, the presence of the U.S. military in Palau, advising the Marshall Islands on the legacy of the nuclear tests done there by the United States, and Guam's right to self-determination, which he argued as Davis v. Guam at the United States Court of Appeals for the Ninth Circuit in 2018 but lost. He has stated that he is "consistently taking on the U.S. empire". He has been dubbed "one of the region’s most vocal critics of American militarism in the Pacific" by the International Socialist Review. His firm has also argued that some cases revolve not around statutes but around human rights and indigenous heritage, such as what he has called "the right to culture".

In 2019, he was called on by Vanuatu for his law firm to become the country's counsel in a case in front of the International Court of Justice, in collaboration with Pacific Islands Students Fighting Climate Change and its head Cynthia Houniuhi. He spent years preparing for the case, and gathered testimony from peoples across Melanesia and beyond. At court, he argued that "climate change, and the conduct responsible for it, has... infringed the right to self-determination for the many peoples of Melanesia". The court subsequently issued an advisory ruling in favor of Vanuatu that would come to be known as the Obligations of States in respect of climate change. Aguon stated that he viewed the ruling as opening the door to "rights-based climate litigation" and "compensation for ecosystem restoration".

== Writing ==
He wrote The Fire This Time: Stories of Life Under U.S. Occupation in 2006. He also wrote Just Left of the Setting Sun that same year. He wrote What We Bury at Night in 2008. It was described as "short but powerful" by the International Socialist Review for its collection of stories about life after World War II and the nuclear testing at Bikini Atoll.

He began writing another book, The Properties of Perpetual Light, during the 2020 COVID-19 epidemic. It was published in 2021 by the University of Guam Press for an audience throughout Micronesia. It soon gained attention, and was featured in The Atlantic's 2021 summer reading guide. This inspired many of its readers to decide to visit Guam.

He also wrote an essay, "To Hell With Drowning", focused on bringing the realities of climate change to life by showing its effect on ordinary people. It was published in The Atlantic in 2021. He became a finalist for the Pulitzer Prize for Commentary in 2022 for the essay, but ultimately did not receive the award.

In 2022, Astra Publishing House republished The Properties of Perpetual Light to a much wider audience under the title No Country for Eight-Spot Butterflies. The republished version included an introduction by Arundhati Roy and an added afterword. The book includes memoir and political commentary about topics ranging from climate change to nuclear weapons, and includes 22 stories and poems. Among its stories and poems are an interview, a graduation speech, and a letter to a friend. Book reviewer Rebecca Foster for Shelf Awareness stated it was "varied and heartfelt" with a "deep love for Guam's people and nature", while Elizabeth Wainright, writing for Geographical, described it as "part memoir, part manifesto, part poetry and entirely beautiful".

== Honors ==
He was awarded a Right Livelihood Award in 2025 jointly with Pacific Islands Students Fighting Climate Change. He was also awarded a Maga'haga award by Governor Lou Leon Guerrero in 2025. He was named to the Time 100 Next in 2026: his profile was written by Christiana Figueres.
