= Eduardo Valencia Ospina =

Colombian lawyer (born 1939)

Chair of the International Law Commission
- In office 2018
- Preceded by: Georg Nolte
- Succeeded by: Pavel Šturma

First Vice-Chair of the International Law Commission
- In office 2017
- Preceded by: Georg Nolte
- Succeeded by: Pavel Šturma

Member of the International Law Commission
- In office 2007–2021

Registrar of the International Court of Justice
- In office 1987–2000
- Preceded by: Santiago Torres Bernárdez
- Succeeded by: Philippe Couvreur

Personal details
- Born: 19 September 1939 (age 87)
- Occupation: Lawyer, former international civil servant

Eduardo Valencia Ospina (born 19 September, 1939) is a Colombian lawyer and former international civil servant. He holds an LL.M. from Harvard Law School (1963), where he specialized in international law and was a Special Graduate Studies student from 1963 to 1964. He also holds a PhD in Juridical Sciences and a PhD in Economic Sciences from the Pontificia Universidad Javeriana in Bogotá, Colombia.

== Biography ==
Born into a wealthy Cali family, Valencia Ospina worked at the United Nations for 36 years before retiring in 2000 with the rank of assistant secretary general. He was senior legal officer at the Office of Legal Affairs, and was the registrar (secretary-general) of the International Court of Justice from 1987 to 2000.

Valencia Ospina served as a member of the International Law Commission for three five-year terms from 2007 to 2021. He served as its first vice chair during its 69th session in 2017, and as chair during its 70th session in 2018. In 2007, he was appointed Special Rapporteur for the report on the "Protection of persons in the event of disasters". The Commission adopted the resulting "Draft articles on the protection of persons in the event of disasters" in 2016. The draft articles were subsequently submitted to the United Nations General Assembly and put on its agenda.

Valencia Ospina is a former president of the Latin American Society of International Law. He also served on the board of several international law journals, including the Journal of International Dispute Settlement. He was the editor-in-chief of The Law and Practice of International Courts and Tribunals.

Valencia Ospina is also an international arbitrator and counsel in cases before the ICJ. He is counsel for Colombia in the maritime border dispute case with Nicaragua, which began in 2001. In October 2022, he was designated by the Ministry of Foreign Affairs of Colombia as the lead counsel.
