= 2020 International Court of Justice judges election =

The 2020 International Court of Justice election was held on 11 and 12 November 2020 at the United Nations Headquarters in New York City. In the set of triennial elections, the General Assembly and the Security Council concurrently elect five judges to the Court for nine-year terms, in this case beginning on 6 February 2021. From the eight candidates, Yuji Iwasawa (Japan), Xue Hanqin (China), Peter Tomka (Slovakia), Julia Sebutinde (Uganda), and Georg Nolte (Germany) have been elected members of the International Court of Justice for a term of office of nine years, as both the Security Council and the General Assembly have agreed on the same candidates.

== Background ==
The International Court of Justice (ICJ), based in The Hague, is one of the principal organs of the United Nations. The court consists of 15 judges, with five judges elected every three years. In the case of death or other vacancy, a judge is elected for the remainder of the term. Judges are required to be independent and impartial; they may not exercise any political or administrative function, and do not act as a representative of their home state. Elections of members of the Court are governed by articles 2 through 15 of the Statute of the International Court of Justice.

Prior to the election, the composition of the Court was as follows:

Judge	Term starts / renewed	Term ends
(Slovakia) Peter Tomka	2003, 2012	2021
(China) Xue Hanqin	2010, 2012	2021
(Uganda) Julia Sebutinde	2012	2021
(Italy) Giorgio Gaja	2012	2021
(Japan) Yuji Iwasawa	2018	2021
(Morocco) Mohamed Bennouna	2006, 2015	2024
(United States) Joan Donoghue	2010, 2015	2024
(Jamaica) Patrick Lipton Robinson	2015	2024
(Russia) Kirill Gevorgian	2015	2024
(Australia) James Crawford	2015	2024
(France) Ronny Abraham	2005, 2009, 2018	2027
(Somalia) Abdulqawi Yusuf	2009, 2018	2027
(Lebanon) Nawaf Salam	2018	2027
(India) Dalveer Bhandari	2012, 2018	2027
(Brazil) Antônio Augusto Cançado Trindade	2009, 2018	2027

The seats of Judges Tomka, Xue, Sebutinde, Gaja and Iwasawa were thus to be contested at the 2020 election. All but Judge Gaja were nominated for re-election.

== Candidates ==
=== Qualifications ===
Article 2 of the Statute of the International Court of Justice provides that judges shall be elected "from among persons of high moral character, who possess the qualifications required in their respective countries for appointment to the highest judicial offices, or are jurisconsults of recognized competence in international law".

=== Nomination procedure ===
All States parties to the Statute of the ICJ have the right to propose candidates. Nominations of candidates for election to the ICJ are made by a group consisting of the members of the Permanent Court of Arbitration (PCA), designated by that State. For this purpose, members of the PCA act in "national groups" (i.e. all the PCA members from any individual state). (In the case of UN member states not represented in the PCA, the state in question may select up to four individuals to be its "national group" for the purpose of nominating candidates to the ICJ). Every such "national group" may nominate up to four candidates, not more than two of whom shall be of their own nationality. Before making these nominations, each "national group" is recommended to consult its highest court of justice, its legal faculties and schools of law, and its national academies and national sections of international academies devoted to the study of law.

=== 2020 nominees ===
On 5 February 2020, the Under-Secretary-General for Legal Affairs and the United Nations Legal Counsel, on behalf of the Secretary-General, requested nominations from the national groups of States parties to the Statute of the Court to be submitted to the Secretary-General not later than 24 June 2020, in accordance with Article 5, paragraph 1, of the Statute of the Court.

After the established deadline for nominating candidates, 24 June 2020, a national group submitted a nomination to the Secretariat. Eight candidates contested the five positions. The nominated candidates for the 2020 election (grouped according to the informal distribution of seats among United Nations Regional Groups) were as follows:

Regional group	Vacancy	Candidate	Nominating national groups
Africa	(Uganda) Julia Sebutinde	(Nigeria) Taoheed Olufemi Elias	Bahrain, Greece, Latvia, Malta, Nigeria, Sweden
Africa	(Uganda) Julia Sebutinde	(Uganda) Julia Sebutinde	Argentina, Denmark, Estonia, Italy, Mexico, Peru, Poland, Slovenia, Finland, Uganda
Africa	(Uganda) Julia Sebutinde	(Rwanda) Emmanuel Ugirashebuja	Bolivia, Morocco, Peru, Rwanda
Asia-Pacific	(Japan) Yuji Iwasawa	(Japan) Yuji Iwasawa	Argentina, Australia, Austria, Bolivia, Brazil, China, Colombia, Czech Republic, Denmark, Estonia, Finland, France, Germany, Greece, Guatemala, Hungary, Italy, Japan, Laos, Latvia, Luxembourg, Malaysia, Malta, Morocco, Netherlands, New Zealand, Norway, Philippines, Peru, Poland, Portugal, Romania, Russian Federation, Singapore, Slovenia, Spain, Sweden, Thailand, UK, USA
Asia-Pacific	(China) Xue Hanqin	(China) Xue Hanqin	Argentina, Australia, Bahrain, Brazil, China, Colombia, Denmark, Dominican Republic, France, Germany, Greece, Guatemala, Hungary, Japan, Mexico, Netherlands, New Zealand, Norway, Pakistan, Russian Federation, Sierra Leone, Singapore, Spain, Sweden, Thailand, United Kingdom, United States
Eastern Europe	(Slovakia) Peter Tomka	(Croatia) Maja Seršić	Croatia, Bolivia, Brazil, Italy, Malta
Eastern Europe	(Slovakia) Peter Tomka	(Slovakia) Peter Tomka	Austria, Bahrain, Czech Republic, Finland, France, Germany, Guatemala, Hungary, Latvia, Luxembourg, Malta, Mexico, Morocco, New Zealand, Norway, Russian Federation, Singapore, Slovakia, Slovenia, United Kingdom
WEOG	(Italy) Giorgio Gaja	(Germany) Georg Nolte	Argentina, Australia, Austria, Bahrain, Bolivia, China, Colombia, Czech Republic, Denmark, Estonia, Finland, France, Germany, Greece, Guatemala, Hungary, Italy, Japan, Latvia, Mexico, Morocco, Netherlands, New Zealand, Norway, Peru, Poland, Portugal, Russian Federation, Slovakia, Slovenia, Spain, Sweden, United Kingdom, Luxembourg

== Election procedure ==
ICJ judges are elected through parallel procedures at the General Assembly and the Security Council. To be elected, a candidate must obtain an absolute majority of votes both in the General Assembly and in the Security Council.

Each of the two bodies, independently from the other, has to determine five persons enjoying support of an absolute majority of its members. Currently, 97 votes constitute an absolute majority in the General Assembly and 8 votes constitute an absolute majority in the Security Council (with no distinction being made between permanent and non-permanent members of the Security Council).

If less than five persons obtain an absolute majority of votes after the first round of balloting, further rounds are held during the same meeting, involving only those candidates that have not obtained an absolute majority of votes. If more than five persons obtain an absolute majority of votes after the first round of balloting, further rounds are held during the same meeting, involving all candidates, until the number of candidates enjoying an absolute majority of votes, becomes five or less.

When five candidates have obtained the required majority in one of the organs, the president of that organ notifies the president of the other organ of the names of the five candidates. The president of the latter does not communicate such names to the members of that organ until that organ itself has given five candidates the required majority of votes.

After both the General Assembly and the Security Council have produced a list of five names that received an absolute majority of the votes, the two lists are compared. Any candidate appearing on both lists is elected. But if fewer than five candidates have been thus elected, the two organs proceed, again independently of one another, at a second meeting and, if necessary, a third meeting to elect candidates by further ballots for seats remaining vacant, the results again being compared after the required number of candidates have obtained an absolute majority in each organ.

According to the ICJ Statute, if after the third meeting, one or more seats still remain unfilled, the General Assembly and the Security Council may form a joint conference consisting of six members, three appointed by each organ. This joint conference may, by an absolute majority, agree upon one name for each seat still vacant and submit the name for the respective acceptance of the General Assembly and the Security Council. If the joint conference is unanimously agreed, it may submit the name of a person not included in the list of nominations, provided that candidate fulfills the required conditions of eligibility to be a judge on the ICJ. In practice, a joint conference has never been convened. Instead, the Assembly and the Council continued balloting in further meetings until the same candidate received an absolute majority of votes in both bodies (usually after the weaker candidate withdrew).

If the General Assembly and the Security Council ultimately are unable to fill one or more vacant seats, then the judges of the ICJ who have already been elected shall proceed to fill the vacant seats by selection from among those candidates who have obtained votes either in the General Assembly or in the Security Council. In the event of a tie vote among the judges, the eldest judge shall have a casting vote. This procedure has never been used.

== Election ==
Candidate	General Assembly majority = 97		Security Council majority = 8
Candidate	Round 1; 11 Nov 2020	Round 2; 12 Nov 2020	Round 1; 11 Nov 2020
(Japan) Yuji Iwasawa	161	169	15
(Germany) Georg Nolte	150	160	14
(China) Xue Hanqin	144	155	13
(Slovakia) Peter Tomka	141	150	13
(Uganda) Julia Sebutinde	124	139	10
(Rwanda) Emmanuel Ugirashebuja	97	87	6
(Croatia) Maja Seršić	71	42	2
(Nigeria) Taoheed Olufemi Elias	56	31	2

As more than five candidates received the absolute majority of votes after the first round of voting at the General Assembly, further rounds were required until only five, and no more, obtained an absolute majority. The Assembly held a second round of voting, still technically being in the same meeting, on 12 November. After Emmanuel Ugirashebuja received less than 97 votes, only 5 candidates remained with an absolute majority.

The Security Council, meeting independently from but concurrently with the General Assembly, chose five candidates in a single round of voting on 11 November 2020.

Since the same five candidates were chosen by the Assembly and the Council, they were thus elected to the Court, without the need of further rounds of voting.

== Aftermath ==
After the election, the composition of the Court was as follows:

Judge	Term starts / renewed	Term ends
(Morocco) Mohamed Bennouna	2006, 2015	2024
(United States) Joan Donoghue	2010, 2015	2024
(Jamaica) Patrick Lipton Robinson	2015	2024
(Russia) Kirill Gevorgian	2015	2024
(Australia) James Crawford	2015	2024
(France) Ronny Abraham	2005, 2009, 2018	2027
(Somalia) Abdulqawi Yusuf	2009, 2018	2027
(Lebanon) Nawaf Salam	2018	2027
(India) Dalveer Bhandari	2012, 2018	2027
(Brazil) Antônio Augusto Cançado Trindade	2009, 2018	2027
(Slovakia) Peter Tomka	2003, 2012, 2021	2030
(China) Xue Hanqin	2010, 2012, 2021	2030
(Uganda) Julia Sebutinde	2012, 2021	2030
(Japan) Yuji Iwasawa	2018, 2021	2030
(Germany) Georg Nolte	2021	2030
