= Interim order =

Order issued while litigation is pending

The term interim order refers to an order issued by a court during the pendency of the litigation. It is generally issued by the Court to ensure Status quo. The rationale for such orders to be issued by the Courts is best explained by the Latin legal maxim "Actus curiae neminem gravabit" which, translated to English, stands for "an act of the court shall prejudice no one". Therefore, to ensure that none of the interests of the parties to the litigation are harmed, the court may issue an interim order.

Interim orders issued by the court may be of various kinds. The nature of the order essentially depends on the direction issued by the Court. Some examples of court orders classified as interim orders include:

- Restraining orders (also called Injunction), which are issued to stop either party from acting in a particular manner during the pendency of the civil action. These are essentially issued by the court to prevent situations in which either party may suffer harm because the other party did/continued an act which was the matter in issue; and
- Directive orders, which are issued to direct either party to continue to act in a particular manner until the conclusion of the trial or until further orders are issued. Directive orders may be issued if the non-continuation of the act would cause harm to the other party.

In public international law, the "rough equivalent" of an interim order is a provisional measure of protection, which can be "indicated" by the International Court of Justice.

== Requirement for an interim order ==
The manner and exercise of powers by the courts are prescribed under the laws of most nations. These may be either enacted by legislation in the form of procedural laws of the country (as done by, for example, the United Kingdom under the Civil Procedure Rules 1998 or are left by the legislature for the courts to determine for themselves (for example the Federal Rules of Civil Procedure). It is under these procedural laws that the power to issue interim orders may be conferred on the courts.

=== India ===
In India, interim orders may be passed by civil courts in matters before them. Such orders can be passed either under the Specific Relief Act passed by the Parliament of India in 1963 or in terms of Section 151 of the Civil Procedure Code of 1908, which recognises and retains some inherent powers with the civil courts. However, the latter provision is usually seldom exercised. In terms of the 1963 Act, an interim order may be passed by the court only if the following conditions are satisfied;

1. Where there is a prima facie case in favour of the party seeking the order,
2. Irreparable damage may be caused to the party if the order is not passed and such damage may not be ascertained in terms or money and payable as damages, and
3. Where the balance of convenience lies with the party requesting for the order.

=== European Court of Human Rights ===
The European Court of Human Rights in Strasbourg, France, may grant interim measures to prevent a state from carrying out an action that could cause irreparable harm before the court has had an opportunity to hear and/or decide a case. The most common circumstance for when interim measures are granted is in cases of extradition or deportation where there is valid evidence that the detainee or asylum seeker would be at risk of torture or the death penalty. Under the court's case law, sending someone to a country where it is reasonable to believe he or she would be tortured amounts to a violation of Article 3 of the European Convention on Human Rights, which prohibits torture. Interim measures are temporary and expire once the court has made a final decision. They are also sometimes referred to as precautionary or preliminary measures.

=== European Court of Justice ===
Interim measures may be granted by the President of the European Court of Justice. See List of European Court of Justice rulings#Interim orders.

== See also ==
- Court order
- Injunction
- Civil action
- Trial
- Hearing (law)
- Interlocutory appeal
