= Solomon Yeo =

Climate activist and legal advocate

- Solomon Yeo in a video launch for a campaign by Pacific Islands Students Fighting Climate Change (PISFCC).
- Education: University of the South Pacific
- Occupations: Climate activist, legal advocate
- Known for: Leading the Pacific Islands Students Fighting Climate Change (PISFCC) campaign for an ICJ advisory opinion
- Awards: SPREP Pacific Islands Environment Leadership Award (2020)

Solomon Yeo is a climate activist and legal advocate from the Solomon Islands, recognised for his role in the group Pacific Islands Students Fighting Climate Change (PISFCC). He worked as one of the group's lead environmental campaigners. The group successfully sought an advisory opinion on climate change. Yeo witnessed the direct impact of environmental degradation and climate change in the Solomon Islands, which motivated him to focus on climate activism.

His advocacy approach centres on youth empowerment and international law. He has emphasised that Pacific Island nations are on the front lines of the climate crisis, facing existential threats such as sea-level rise and extreme weather events, despite their minimal contribution to global greenhouse gas emissions.

== Early life and education ==
Yeo was born and raised in the Solomon Islands, the son of parents who moved there as missionaries in the 1990s.

He attended the University of the South Pacific, where he completed his law degree. In 2019, during his final year at school, he enrolled in a course on international environmental law. The same year, with 26 other students, he co-founded the Pacific Islands Students Fighting Climate Change (PISFCC), a youth-led organisation dedicated to integrating human rights into international climate discourse.

== Career ==
While a student, Yeo became the campaign director for PISFCC. As a member of the group, Yeo helped lead a multi-year effort to secure an advisory opinion on climate change and human rights from the International Court of Justice (ICJ) as part of the movement's diplomatic and grassroots lobbying efforts. His work with the PISFCC involved lobbying of Pacific governments, which eventually led to the government of Vanuatu to sponsor the initiative at the United Nations General Assembly. This led to a unanimous vote at the UN General Assembly to refer the matter to the ICJ.

Yeo described the process of seeking an ICJ advisory opinion like opening a "fridge." He argues that they were not attempting to create new laws or invent arguments, but rather to take what already exists in international law, such as human rights treaties, and to clarify legal grey areas regarding climate change.

His work has contributed to broader international efforts in climate litigation. In November 2021, while attending the United Nations Climate Change Conference (COP26) in Glasgow, Yeo highlighted necessity of substantive commitments from global leaders. He argued that existing international responses had been insufficient to protect vulnerable Pacific Island nations sitting at the threshold of climate change. He acknowledged the work from others working at the grassroots level to help raise the issue.

In addition to his international work, Yeo has been involved in local environmental initiatives in the Solomon Islands, including the establishment of the Solomon Islands Youth Environmental Movement.

== Awards and recognition ==
For his leadership in youth climate advocacy, he was awarded the SPREP Pacific Islands Environment Leadership Award in 2020.

== See also ==
- Cynthia Houniuhi
