= Olufemi Elias =

Nigerian lawyer

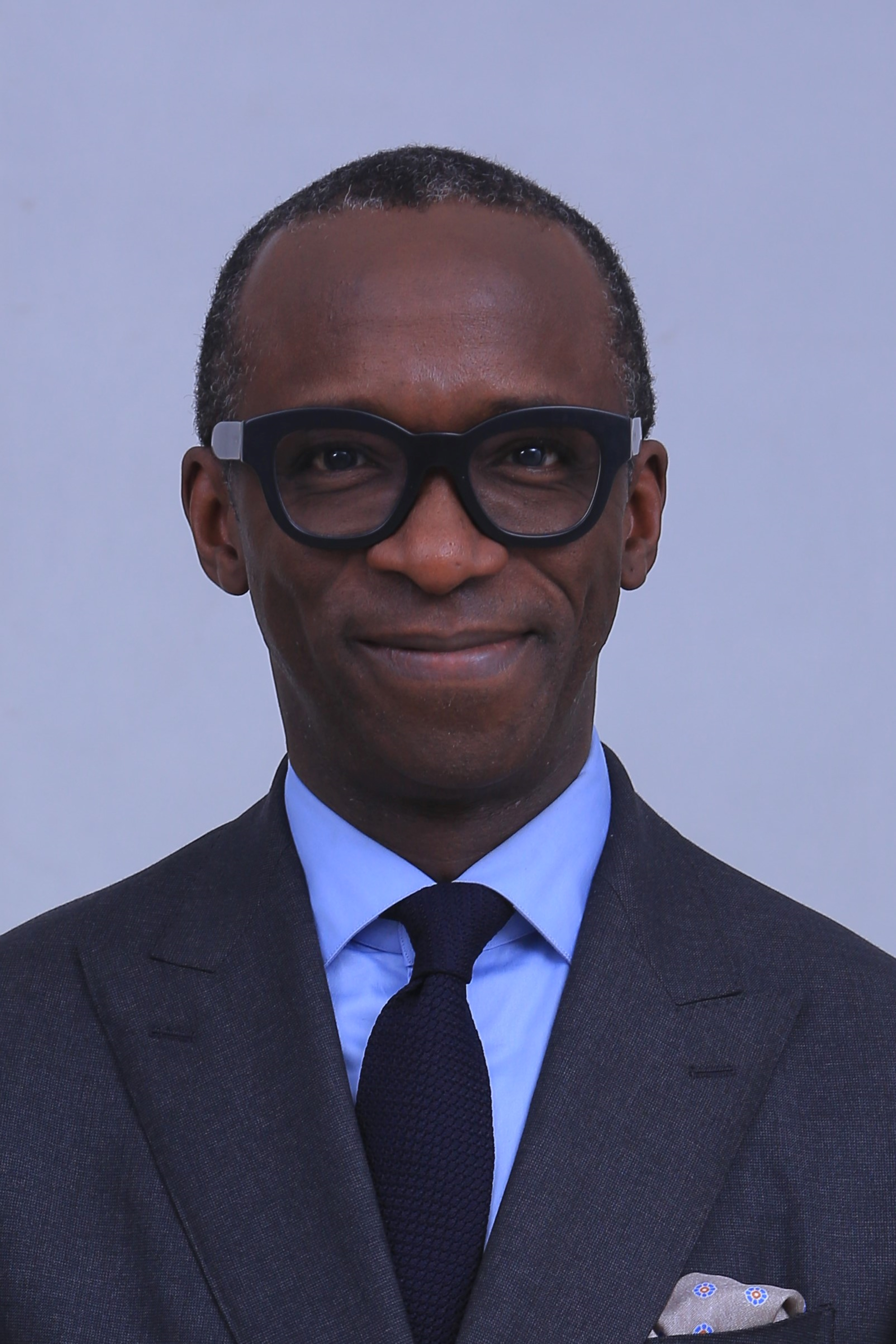
- In office September 2024 – Present

Personal details
- Occupation: Judge Ad Hoc of the International Court of Justice

Olufemi Elias is a Nigerian international lawyer who currently serves as a judge ad hoc at the International Court of Justice (ICJ). He is a full member of the Institut de Droit International.

== Early life and education ==
Elias studied at Corona School, and then Igbobi College, Lagos, Nigeria before obtaining a law degree from the University of Oxford, a Master of Laws from the University of Cambridge and a doctorate from University College London. He was called to the Nigerian Bar in 1988.

== Career ==
He is the President of the Administrative Tribunal of the OPEC Fund for International Development, and Chairman of the Islamic Development Bank Administrative Tribunal. He is a former President and member of the Appeals' Committee of the Organization of Petroleum Exporting Countries. He advises international organizations and States on legal issues, including litigation before international courts and tribunals. He is a Member of the Panel of Arbitrators of the Hong Kong Regional Arbitration Centre of the Asian African Legal Consultative Organisation.

Elias is a visiting professor in international law at the Department of Law, Queen Mary University of London and has taught at the King's College London and the University of Buckingham. He is also the author of several publications in the field of International Law and was awarded the Honorary Membership Award of the American Society of International Law(ASIL) in recognition of his contributions to international law.

He was Registrar (United Nations Assistant Secretary-General), of the International Residual Mechanism for Criminal Tribunals (IRMCT) until 30 June 2020. Elias has held several functions including being a Judge for Staff Appeals, Special Tribunal for Lebanon (STL); Legal Adviser and Director, Organisation for the Prohibition of Chemical Weapons (OPCW), The Hague; Executive Secretary (Registrar), World Bank Administrative Tribunal, Washington D.C.; Senior Legal Officer, OPCW; Special Assistant to the Executive Secretary, United Nations Compensation Commission (UNCC), Geneva and Legal Adviser, Governing Council Secretariat, UNCC. Elias was a candidate in the 2020 International Court of Justice judges election. He was not elected. In early 2022, Elias was appointed by the International Monetary Fund to an external panel to strengthen institutional safeguards in the wake of a data scandal involving IMF Managing Director Kristalina Georgieva during her time at the World Bank.

== Statements and speeches ==
Date	Statement or Speech
11 Jul 2018	Registrar Elias' Address at the commemoration of the Srebrenica genocide
8 Mar 2018	Registrar Elias' message in commemoration of International Women's Day 2018
17 May 2017	Registrar Elias’ remarks at the Diplomatic Briefing at the Hague branch of the Mechanism

== Other activities ==
- American Society of International Law, Former Member of the Executive Council
- International Arbitration Review, Member of the Advisory Board
- African Association of International Law, Former Secretary General
- African Journal of International and Comparative Law, Member of the Editorial Board
- International Gender Champions (IGC), Member
- International Law Association, Member
- Nigerian Society of International Law, Life Member
- Igbobi College Old Boy's Association Merit Award for Professional Achievement
