= Philippe Couvreur =

Belgian jurist and international lawyer

Registrar of the International Court of Justice
- In office 2000 – 1 July 2019
- Preceded by: Eduardo Valencia Ospina
- Succeeded by: Philippe Gautier

Personal details
- Born: 29, November, 1951 Schaerbeek, Brussels, Belgium
- Education: Université catholique de Louvain; University of Namur; King's College London; Complutense University of Madrid
- Occupation: Jurist
- Profession: International Judge

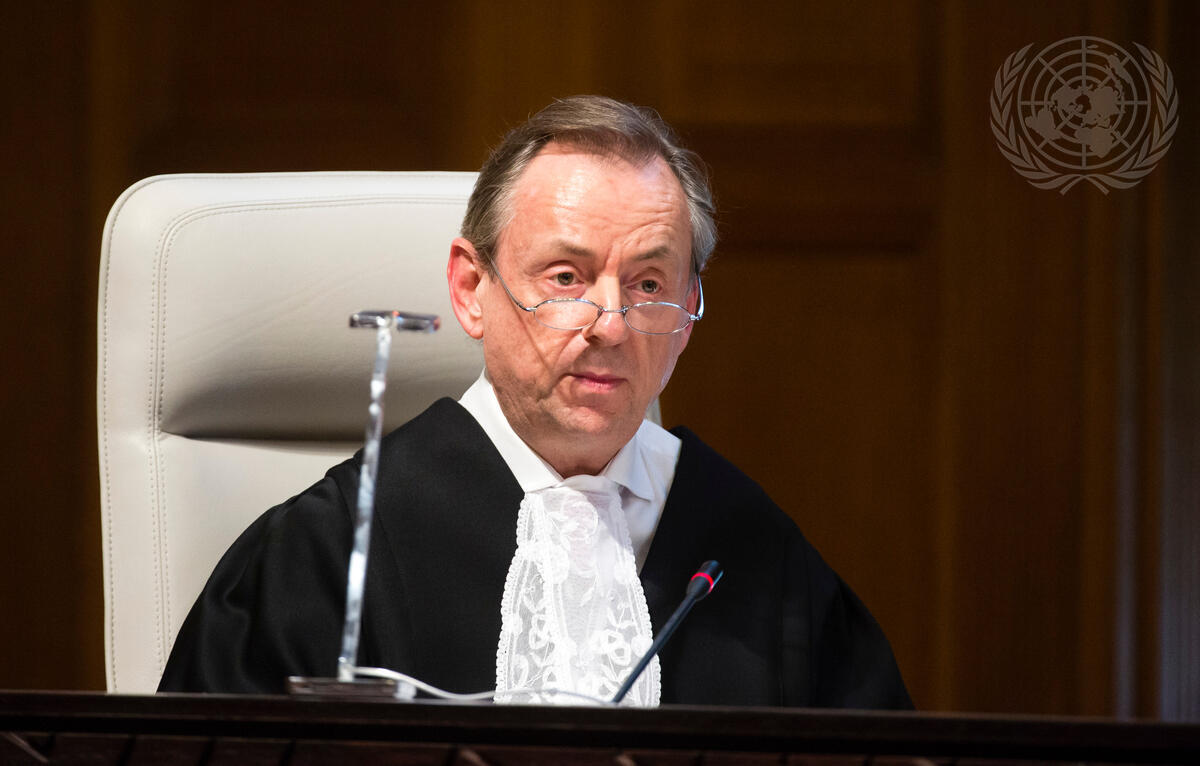
Philippe Couvreur, Registrar of the International Court of Justice (ICJ), during the delivery of the Order of the Court on the request for the indication of new provisional measures, filed by Costa Rica in the case concerning ''Certain Activities carried out by Nicaragua in the Border Area (Costa Rica v. Nicaragua)''. ICJ news and archives: https://www.icj-cij.org

Philippe Couvreur (born 29 November 1951)is a Belgian jurist and scholar of international law. He served as Registrar of the International Court of Justice (ICJ) from 2000 to 2019, following earlier roles within the Court's Registry. His tenure is associated with the development and consolidation of the Registry as a central institutional component of international adjudication. He remains active as an academic, author, and contributor to international legal discourse on the functioning of international courts and tribunals.

== Early life and education ==
Couvreur received his secondary education at the Collège Jean XXIII in Brussels, where he completed classical studies (humanités gréco-latines) and was awarded the gold medal for secondary education.

He pursued legal studies at the Université de Namur (then Facultés Notre-Dame de la Paix), where he obtained his candidature in law with high distinction (1969–1971), and at the Université catholique de Louvain, where he obtained a law degree (licence en droit) with distinction (1971–1974). His dissertation concerned provisional measures before the International Court of Justice.

At the Université catholique de Louvain, he also completed a degree in Thomistic philosophy (baccalauréat en philosophie thomiste) with high distinction (1972–1974).

He subsequently undertook postgraduate studies in international and European law at King's College London (1974–1975) and the Complutense University of Madrid (1975–1976), where he was awarded a scholarship by the Spanish Ministry of Foreign Affairs. He later completed additional training in European law at the Université catholique de Louvain (1978).

He also undertook further specialised training in international and European law.

Couvreur is fluent in French, English, Spanish, Italian, and Dutch.

== Career ==
=== European Commission ===
Couvreur began his professional career at the European Commission, where he worked within its Legal Service on matters of European and international law.

=== International Court of Justice ===
Couvreur joined the International Court of Justice in 1987. He served in successive roles within the Registry, including Principal Legal Secretary.

He was appointed Registrar in 2000 and served in that capacity until 1 July 2019.

== Registrar of the ICJ (2000–2019) ==
As Registrar, Couvreur led the Registry of the Court, the body responsible for providing legal, administrative, and diplomatic support to the ICJ.

The functions of the Registrar include:

- Managing the conduct of proceedings and maintaining case records
- Overseeing the administration and organisation of the Registry
- Acting as an interface between the Court, States, and international organisations

The Registry operates as a permanent institutional structure supporting the Court's judicial activity across cases and over time.

During Couvreur's tenure, the Court dealt with an increasingly diverse and complex caseload, reflecting the growing role of international adjudication in the settlement of disputes between States.

His work is identified in academic literature as illustrating the importance of the Registrar in ensuring procedural continuity, institutional memory, and effective functioning of international courts.

== Post-ICJ career (2019–present) ==
Following his tenure at the Court, Couvreur has continued to engage in international adjudication, arbitration, scholarship, and legal education.

Since 2019, he has served as an ad hoc judge at the International Court of Justice, maintaining direct involvement in international dispute settlement.

In addition, he has acted as an arbitrator at the International Centre for Settlement of Investment Disputes (since 2021) and as an ad hoc judge at the International Tribunal for the Law of the Sea (since 2023).

He has participated in proceedings before the International Court of Justice, including the cases Territorial, Insular and Maritime Claim (Guatemala v. Belize) and Arbitral Award of 3 October 1899 (Guyana v. Venezuela).

Alongside his judicial work, Couvreur continues to contribute to international legal scholarship and education. He delivered a course at the Hague Academy of International Law in 2022 entitled The Statute of the International Court of Justice: Assessment and Perspectives. This course formed the basis of a monograph published by Brill in 2025.

He contributes to international legal education through the United Nations Audiovisual Library of International Law, where he delivers lectures on the practice and procedure of the International Court of Justice and on the Permanent Court of International Justice.

He also participates in international conferences, academic programmes, and expert forums on international adjudication and dispute settlement.

== Academic career ==
Couvreur began his academic career as an assistant at the Centre for European Studies and the Faculty of Law of the Université catholique de Louvain (1976–1982).

He served as a visiting professor of the law of international organisations at the University of Ouagadougou (Burkina Faso) from 1980 to 1982.

From 1986 to 1996, he taught public international law (droit des gens) and comparative constitutional law at HEC Saint-Louis in Brussels.

He subsequently taught at the Université catholique de Louvain as a lecturer and invited professor, where he co-taught courses in advanced public international law and contemporary issues in international law (1997–2017).

He delivered a course at the Hague Academy of International Law in 2022 entitled The Statute of the International Court of Justice: Assessment and Perspectives, which formed the basis of a monograph published by Brill in 2025.

== Scholarship and contributions ==
Couvreur's scholarship focuses on the institutional and procedural dimensions of international adjudication.

His work addresses:

- The effectiveness of international law through judicial mechanisms
- The role of registries in international courts
- Institutional design and practice of international tribunals
- Evidentiary issues in international litigation

His book The International Court of Justice and the Effectiveness of International Law has been discussed in academic literature addressing the role of international courts in the development of international law.

== Lectures and public engagement ==
Couvreur has delivered lectures and participated in conferences at institutions including the Hague Academy of International Law, the Université catholique de Louvain, the University of Helsinki, the University of Seoul, and the University of Nice Sophia-Antipolis.

He has also contributed to international legal education through lecture series and online courses, including programmes of the United Nations Audiovisual Library of International Law.

== Memberships and affiliations ==
Couvreur was elected an associate member of the Institut de droit international in 2021 and became a full member in 2025.

He is a Corresponding Member of the Royal Academy of Moral and Political Sciences (Spain).

He is also a member of the Scientific Council of the international law courses at Vitoria-Gasteiz.

== Honours ==
Couvreur has received several national honours in recognition of his contributions to international law and judicial service.

- Grand Officer of the Order of Leopold (Belgium)
- Officer of the Legion of Honour (France)
- Commander by Number of the Order of Civil Merit (Spain)
- Commander of the Order of Merit (Romania)
- Commander by Number of the Order of Isabella the Catholic (Spain)
- Medal of Diplomatic Merit "Dr. José Gustavo Guerrero" (El Salvador)

== Reception and influence ==
Couvreur's work on the functioning of the International Court of Justice is discussed in academic literature, particularly in relation to the effectiveness of international adjudication.

His tenure as Registrar is described in independent commentary as a period of sustained institutional continuity within the Court.

== Selected publications ==
Couvreur's scholarship focuses on the practice and procedure of international adjudication, particularly the work of the International Court of Justice. His publications are frequently concerned with the institutional operation of the International Court of Justice, including the role of the Registry, the Court's effectiveness, and evidentiary questions in international adjudication.

=== Books ===
- Couvreur, Philippe (2016). The International Court of Justice and the Effectiveness of International Law. Collected Courses of the Xiamen Academy of International Law. Vol. 9. Brill/Martinus Nijhoff. ISBN 9789004328860.

=== Book chapters and contributions ===
- Couvreur, Philippe (2007). "The Registrar of the International Court of Justice: Status and Functioning". In Jiménez Piernas, Carlos (ed.). The Legal Practice in International Law and European Community Law. Martinus Nijhoff. pp. 7–61. doi:10.1163/ej.9789004154261.i-689.7.
- Couvreur, Philippe (2015). "The International Court of Justice". In De Baere, Geert; Wouters, Jan (eds.). The Contribution of International and Supranational Courts to the Rule of Law. Edward Elgar. pp. 85–126.
- Couvreur, Philippe (2016). "Privileges and Immunities of Members of the International Court of Justice, the Registrar and Officials of the Registry, and Other Persons Connected with the Business of the Court". In Reinisch, August (ed.). The Conventions on the Privileges and Immunities of the United Nations and its Specialized Agencies: A Commentary. Oxford University Press. pp. 859–871.

=== Articles and lectures ===
- Couvreur, Philippe (2017). "70 years of the International Court of Justice: how does it remain relevant in a changing world?". Sophia Law Review. 61: 1–15.
- Couvreur, Philippe (2017). "L'œuvre de la CIJ à la veille de son 70e anniversaire. Son rôle dans la réalisation des buts et principes des Nations Unies". Romanian Journal of International Law. 17: 8–25.
- Couvreur, Philippe. "The Registrar of the International Court of Justice: Status and functioning". United Nations Audiovisual Library of International Law.

== See also ==
- International Court of Justice
- Public international law
