= Cynthia Houniuhi =

Solomonese environmental activist and professor

- Houniuhi in 2019
- Born: 1993 or 1994 (age 32–33); Reef Islands, Solomon Islands
- Education: University of New South Wales (LLM); University of the South Pacific (LLB)
- Occupations: Environmental activist; professor
- Organization: President of Pacific Island Students Fighting Climate Change
- Awards: Time 100 Next 2023, Time Climate 100 2025

Cynthia Rosah Bareagihaka Houniuhi (born 1993 or 1994) is a Solomonese environmental activist and professor who is most known for being a co-founder of and serving as President of Pacific Island Students Fighting Climate Change, which successfully convinced the International Court of Justice to issue its 2025 Advisory Ruling on the Obligation of States in Cases of Climate Change. She currently works as a Lecturer of Law at the University of the South Pacific, her alma mater. She was named a Time 100 Next in 2023, and a Time Climate 100 in 2025.

== Biography ==
She was born and raised in the Reef Islands, an island chain within the Solomon Islands.She has frequently reflected on her youth in the islands, where she planted crops, fished, hunted, and was taught about the importance about caring for the environment. She first realized the problem of climate change and rising tides when, during a visit to her father's island, she observed houses deep in salt water and families evacuated.

She began law school at the University of the South Pacific. During her third year of law school, in 2019, her lecturer tasked her class with promoting climate justice. They soon thought of getting the International Court of Justice to issue an advisory opinion on climate justice, and after some hesitation, formed Pacific Island Students Fighting Climate Change in an effort to do just that. After a start involving crowdfunding the necessary money for their first banner, Houniuhi and her organization were propelled by the support of Ralph Regenvanu, Vanuatu's Minister of Foreign Affairs and Trade.

By 2023, the United Nations had issued a unanimous request for this advisory opinion. Houniuhi herself took the stand during the International Court's hearing to present a six-minute speech focusing on what she called the fundamental injustice of the harms being done to Pacific Island nations by climate change when they contributed only a tiny fraction of the damage.

The court ultimately ruled that nations are responsible if they fail to stop the climate crisis, the Paris Agreement is binding, and extraction of fossil fuels could be considered a crime.

She was named to the Time 100 Next in 2023; her profile was written by Mary Robinson. She was also named to the Time Climate 100 in 2025.

She currently works as an Assistant Lecturer of Law at the University of the South Pacific.

== See also ==
- Solomon Yeo
