= Provisional measure of protection =

Legal procedure to provide temporary relief until a case is decided upon its merits

A provisional measure of protection is the term that the International Court of Justice (ICJ, World Court) uses to describe a procedure "roughly equivalent" to an interim order (which can be either a temporary restraining order or a temporary directive order) in national legal systems. The order has also been termed in the press as preliminary measures. The carrying out of the procedure is termed indicating the provisional measure of protection. Requests for the indication of provisional measures of protection take priority over all other cases before the ICJ due to their urgency.

== History ==
As of July 2018, the ICJ had dealt with 36 requests for the indication of provisional measures of protection (the number does not include multiple simultaneous versions of nearly-identical cases; it counts the "Legality of the Use of Force" cases once rather than ten times, but it includes multiple requests arising at different times in the same case by counting the 2004 Avena case twice). In 1989, that number was twelve.

Some of the parties involved include Iran, Pakistan, the United States, Nicaragua, Burkina Faso, and Mali.

On August 13, 2008, during the 2008 South Ossetia War, Georgia submitted a request for the indication of provisional measures of protection. The request was approved by a vote of 8 to 7.

In January 2020, The Gambia successfully obtained an ICJ order for preliminary measures against Myanmar "to take urgent measures to protect its Muslim Rohingya population from persecution and atrocities, and preserve evidence of alleged crimes against them" under an enforcement of the 1948 Genocide Convention. The injunction had been registered with the Court some 60 days earlier. The 17-member court issued a unanimous decision. The final ruling might take years to be issued although the preliminary measures order called for the government of Myanmar to report its compliance within four months.
