= Pacific Islands Students Fighting Climate Change =

Youth-led climate advocacy group

Pacific Island Students Fighting Climate Change
- The launch video from PISFCC's campaign seeking an advisory opinion from the International Court of Justice (ICJ) regarding the legal obligations of states to address climate change.
- Abbreviation: PISFCC
- Formation: 2019
- Location: University of the South Pacific
- Region served: Oceania
- Fields: climate change advocacy, international law, human rights
- Key people: Solomon Yeo; Cynthia Houniuhi; Vishal Prasad
- Website: www.pisfcc.org

Pacific Islands Students Fighting Climate Change (PISFCC) is a youth-led advocacy organisation based at the University of the South Pacific (USP). Founded in 2019 by a group of 27 law students, the organisation became known for its campaign to secure an advisory opinion from the International Court of Justice (ICJ). The PISFCC campaign gained international support by reframing climate change as a human rights issue rather than just an environmental policy matter.

The students of PISFCC engaged in lobbying efforts at the Pacific Islands Forum and international climate summits. The students secured the support of the government of Vanuatu, which became the primary state sponsor of the resolution.

== Overview ==
The youth of PISFCC decided to petition the ICJ, the highest court in the world to issue an advisory opinion. After securing the support of the government of Vanuatu, the PISFCC could then engage in the United Nations General Assembly process to formally request an advisory opinion. As a part of this process, PISFCC lobbied Pacific governments to support their bid. The government of Vanuatu ultimately agreed to sponsor the students' initiative at the United Nations General Assembly.

The court issued an opinion confirming that the full range of international law, including human rights obligations, applies to climate change. The ICJ advised that states have a legal duty to prevent harm caused by greenhouse gas emissions. Greenhouse gas emissions impact the Pacific significantly although Pacific Island nations make up just 1% of the world's greenhouse gas emissions.

== History ==
PISFCC was created in February 2019 by 27 law students from across the Pacific, who were enrolled in an international environmental law class at the University of the South Pacific (USP). The class at USP was instructed by Justin Rose.

The founding group was motivated by their collective experience of the climate crisis and their desire to see something done to deter states from contributing to it, but not addressing it. Many of the students had experienced the immediate effects of a changing climate firsthand.

With many Pacific Island nations dealing first hand with the severe impacts of climate change, such as rising sea levels, ocean acidification, and frequent, intense tropical cyclones, the students aimed to leverage international law to hold states accountable. However, other attempts to discuss climate change at the ICJ had previously failed to get enough support, such as that undertaken by the island nation of Palau from 2011-2012.

Student leadership from the group went on to speak about their experience in the Pacific and their campaign to have states address climate change at events like COP 26 and the Pacific Island Forum. Solomon Yeo initially served as president of PISFCC and Madeleine Lavemai served as vice president.

== Timeline ==
=== State-sponsorship (2019) ===
The partnership between PISFCC and the government of Vanuatu began after Rose posted a video on the class' online platform about Ralph Regenvanu Vanuatu's then-foreign-affairs minister. The video outlined his government's interest in using judicial systems to hold countries accountable.

After seeing the video, the students decided to approach Vanuatu and request that they champion the move for an advisory opinion at the ICJ. The students reached out to Regenvanu. Regenvanu responded positively to the students' proposal, describing being very happy to receive a passionate call from youth.

Vanuatu became the state sponsor for the resolution. Regenvanu championed the initiative within the United Nations General Assembly. Vanuatu's willingness, through the support of Regenvanu, to align the state's diplomatic resources, gave political legitimacy to the students' ICJ advisory opinion request.

=== United Nations General Assembly vote (2023) ===
The students' resolution requesting an ICJ advisory opinion was taken to the United Nations General Assembly and vote was held on the matter in March 2023. The group needed 97 of the 193 member states of the United Nations to pass a resolution. The measure passed by a unanimous vote at the UN General Assembly in support of referring the matter to the ICJ.

=== The People's Assembly and the People's Petition (2024) ===
The People's Petition was a collective declaration submitted to the ICJ by PISFCC, in partnership with the World Youth for Climate Justice and the Future Generations Tribunal. It was a primary outcome of the People's Assembly held in The Hague from 3–5 December 2024. The document integrates the lived experiences of frontline communities into the ICJ's advisory proceedings regarding state obligations on climate change.

The petition seeks to reframe the climate crisis from a technical environmental policy challenge into a fundamental human rights emergency. It argues that current international frameworks, such as the Paris Agreement, are insufficient to protect the "inalienable and fundamental human rights" of global populations. The petition urges the ICJ to establish that states have binding, enforceable obligations to protect individuals from climate-related harm, specifically citing the rights to life, health, and a sustainable environment. Although the ICJ's advisory opinions themselves are not legally binding.

The petition was structured around the testimonies of 18 witnesses representing representing communities that contribute minimally to global greenhouse gas emissions yet face the most severe consequences of climate change. The selection process aimed to centre representation from Small Island Developing States like Vanuatu, Kiribati, and Tuvalu, where rising sea levels, the impact of extractivism, deforestation, and the erosion of knowledge on Indigenous and tribal communities. The document details how climate change exacerbates systemic injustices, including food insecurity, water scarcity, and public health crises for frontline communities in India, Pakistan, and Mozambique.

The petition advocated for a "needs for justice" framework to guide the ICJ's interpretation of state responsibility. This type of framework emphasises intergenerational equity by acknowledging the legal and moral duty is owed to future generations. This was suggested to be done by providing financial support for adaptation measures. It also put forth that loss and damage funding should be provided as grants rather than loans. It also called for an equitable phase-out of fossil fuels. The document also promoted epistemic justice in its format which prioritised the agency and knowledge of Indigenous and local communities within the international legal process.

=== ICJ advisory opinion (2025) ===
==== Legal strategy and arguments ====
Arguments were brought to the ICJ through several mechanisms. PISFCC leaders, including Cynthia Houniuhi and Vishal Prasad, delivered statements during the oral hearings in December 2024. They shared the lived experiences of frontline communities to illustrate the tangible human cost of climate change through the People's Petition, which was formally submitted to the ICJ judges.

The student's overall strategy centred on reframing climate change from a technical policy issue into a human rights matter. The group chose to frame their legal quest as a fundamental human rights issue to broaden its appeal. By applying a human rights lens, the students tried to establish that existing international human rights treaties and customary international law impose legal obligations on states regarding climate-related harm. An advisory opinion from the ICJ could potentially clarify state obligations without a contentious case between specific nations.

The group argued from a human rights nexus perspective that climate change directly infringes upon fundamental rights, including the right to life, health, food, water, and a sustainable environment. They argued that states have existing obligations under international human rights treaties to protect their citizens from climate-related harm. The students also urged the Court to move beyond the Paris Agreement.

The students of PISFCC advocated for a holistic interpretation of international law that incorporated elements of human rights instruments and customary international law. The students argued that the current generation has a legal and moral duty to consider the rights and interests of future generations, who will bear the most severe consequences of climate change caused by past and present emissions.

The group sought clarity from the ICJ that states have a legal obligation to prevent climate harm. They argued that failing to exercise due diligence in regulating greenhouse gas emissions constitutes an internationally wrongful act. They put forth that this carries legal consequences. PISFCC implemented an advocacy strategy that incorporated testimonies from communities on the frontline. The testimonies provided evidence of the connection between the harm caused by greenhouse gas emissions and fundamental human rights.

==== Ruling ====
In July 2025, the ICJ delivered a unanimous ruling confirming that international law, including human rights obligations, applies to climate change. This establishes that states have a legal duty to prevent harm caused by greenhouse gas emissions.

== Media and cultural impact ==
The PISFCC campaign generated international media coverage. The initiative was an example of youth-led activism successfully influencing formal legal systems. The movement became a subject of academic and cultural interest, as it provided a model for how frontline communities can utilise judicial mechanisms to hold states accountable.

== See also ==
- Climate justice
- Environmental law
- International law
- University of the South Pacific
