= Philippe Gautier (judge) =

Belgian lawyer (born 1960)

Registrar of the International Court of Justice
- In office 1 August 2019 – 31 July 2026
- Preceded by: Philippe Couvreur
- Succeeded by: Santiago Villalpando

Personal details
- Born: 1 February 1960 (age 66) Bujumbura, Burundi

Philippe Gautier (born 1 February 1960) is a Belgian lawyer. He served as the Registrar of the International Court of Justice from 2019 to 2026. Born in Bujumbura, Burundi, Gautier received his license to practice law in 1982, and served in various capacities in the arbitration of international disputes.

On 22 May 2019, Gautier was elected by the members of the court to a seven-year term as Registrar of the Court, beginning 1 August 2019.

Gautier previously worked at the Center for International and European Law (French: centre de droit international et européen) of the Université catholique de Louvain. He has written various books and articles in the field.
