= Georg Nolte =

German jurist (born 1959)

His Excellency Georg Nolte

Judge of the International Court of Justice (Seat 12)
- Incumbent
- Assumed office 6 February 2021
- Preceded by: Giorgio Gaja

Chairman of the UN International Law Commission
- In office 2017–2017

Personal details
- Born: 3 October 1959 Bonn, North Rhine-Westphalia, West Germany
- Parent: Ernst Nolte (father)

Academic work
- Sub-discipline: Public international law

Georg Nolte (born 3 October 1959) is a German jurist and Judge of the International Court of Justice. He is professor of public international law at the Humboldt University of Berlin and has been a member of the UN's International Law Commission from 2007 to 2021, serving as its chairman in 2017. In November 2020 he was elected Judge of the International Court of Justice by the United Nations General Assembly and the Security Council, and he took office on 6 February 2021.

== Career ==
Nolte was born in Bonn to the prominent historian and philosopher Ernst Nolte and Annedore Mortier. He studied law, international relations and philosophy at the Free University of Berlin and the University of Geneva from 1977 to 1983. From 1984 to 1990, he was a junior fellow at the Max Planck Institute for Comparative Public Law and International Law in Heidelberg, and earned his doctorate in law at Heidelberg University in 1991 with the dissertation Defamation Law in Democratic States, a comparative analysis of Germany, the United States and the jurisprudence of the European Convention on Human Rights. After holding visiting fellowships at Leipzig University and New York University School of Law from 1990 to 1992, he was a senior fellow at the Max Planck Institute for Comparative Public Law and International Law from 1992 to 1999, and earned his habilitation in 1998 with the book Intervention upon Invitation on the use of force by foreign troops in internal conflicts.

Between 1999 and 2004, he held the chair of public international law at the University of Göttingen, and was Dean of the Faculty of Law in 2004. From 2004 to 2008, he held the chair in public international law at LMU Munich, in succession to Bruno Simma. In 2008, he succeeded Christian Tomuschat as holder of the chair of public international law at the Humboldt University of Berlin. He is also head of the Center for Global Constitutionalism at the WZB Berlin Social Science Center.

In 2000, he was commissioned by the Ministry of Defence to lead a study comparing European systems of military law, against the backdrop of the European Union's efforts to create the Common Security and Defence Policy; the study resulted in the book European Military Law Systems (2003; also published in German in 2002). Nolte wrote in the foreword that the prospect of establishing European armed forces required a better understanding of the national military legal systems of the member states.

Since the turn of the century, he has been a visiting fellow at All Souls College, Oxford from 2003 to 2004, a visiting professor at the Panthéon-Assas University in 2004 and a visiting fellow at Princeton University's Law and Public Affairs Program from 2013 to 2014. From 2000 to 2007, he was a member of the Council of Europe's European Commission for Democracy through Law, the Venice Commission. He has been a member of the German Foreign Office's advisory council on public international law since 2006. He is member of the advisory board of the Goettingen Journal of International Law.

He was elected as a member of the International Law Commission by the United Nations General Assembly in 2007. He was reelected in 2011, receiving the highest number of votes among all candidates. Within the ILC, he founded and chairs the study group on "Treaties over Time." In 2017 he was elected chairperson of the ILC.

He was President of the German Society of International Law from 2013 to 2017. He was elected as a member of the Institut de Droit International in 2019.

=== Judge of the International Court of Justice ===
On 12 November 2020, Nolte was elected Judge of the International Court of Justice, with 160 out of 193 votes cast in the United Nations General Assembly and 14 out of 15 votes cast in the Security Council. He started his nine-year term on 6 February 2021. Foreign Minister Heiko Maas said Nolte is "one of the world's most renowned international legal scholars."

== Selected works ==
- Intervention upon Invitation: Use of Force by Foreign Troops in Internal Conflicts at the Invitation of a Government under International Law, Springer, 1999; published in German with an English summary (German title: Eingreifen auf Einladung: Zur völkerrechtlichen Zulässigkeit des Einsatzes fremder Truppen im internen Konflikt auf Einladung der Regierung)
- United States Hegemony and the Foundations of International Law, ed. with Michael Byers, Cambridge University Press, 2003
- European Military Law Systems, De Gruyter, 2003; also published in German the previous year
- European and US Constitutionalism, ed., Cambridge University Press, 2005
- Le droit international face au défi américain, ed., Cours et travaux de l'IHEI de Paris, Pedone, 2005
- Peace through International Law: The Role of the International Law Commission, ed. Springer, 2009
- The Charter of the United Nations: A Commentary, ed. with Bruno Simma, Daniel-Erasmus Khan and Andreas Paulus, Oxford Commentaries on International Law, Oxford University Press, 2012
- Treaties and Subsequent Practice, ed., Oxford University Press, 2013
- The Interpretation of International Law by Domestic Courts: Uniformity, Diversity, Convergence, ed. with Helmut Philipp Aust, Oxford University Press, 2016
