= International Court of Justice =

Judicial organ of the United Nations

- Cour internationale de justice
- Emblem of the International Court of Justice

- The Peace Palace, the seat of the court
- Interactive map of International Court of Justice
- 52°05′12″N 4°17′44″E
- Established: June 26, 1945; 81 years ago
- Jurisdiction: Worldwide, 193 state parties
- Location: The Hague, Netherlands
- Coordinates: 52°05′12″N 4°17′44″E
- Authorised by: UN Charter; ICJ Statute
- Judge term length: 9 years
- Number of positions: 15
- Website: icj-cij.org/home

President
- Currently: Yuji Iwasawa
- Since: 3 March 2025

Vice President
- Currently: Julia Sebutinde
- Since: 6 February 2024

The International Court of Justice (ICJ; French: Cour internationale de justice, CIJ), or colloquially the World Court, is the principal judicial organ of the United Nations (UN). It settles legal disputes submitted to it by states and provides advisory opinions on legal questions referred to it by other UN organs and specialized agencies. The ICJ is the only international court that adjudicates general disputes between countries, with its rulings and opinions serving as primary sources of international law. It is one of the six principal organs of the United Nations.

Established in June 1945 by the Charter of the United Nations, the court began work in April 1946. It is the successor to the Permanent Court of International Justice (PCIJ), which was established by the League of Nations in 1920. Its founding statute is an integral part of the UN Charter and draws heavily from that of its predecessor. All UN member states are automatically parties to the ICJ Statute, but the court's jurisdiction in contentious cases is founded upon the consent of the states party to a dispute, which may be given through special agreements or declarations accepting the court's compulsory jurisdiction.

The court comprises a panel of 15 judges elected by the UN General Assembly and Security Council to nine-year terms. The composition of the bench is required to represent the "main forms of civilization and the principal legal systems of the world", and no two judges may be nationals of the same country. The ICJ is seated in the Peace Palace in The Hague, Netherlands, making it the only principal UN organ not in New York City. Its official working languages are English and French.

Since its first case was submitted in 1947, the court has entertained 201 cases as of September 2025. While its judgments are binding on the parties and final, the ICJ has no formal enforcement mechanism. Enforcement of its rulings is ultimately a political matter for the UN Security Council, where it is subject to the veto power of the five permanent members.

== History ==
The first permanent institution established for the purpose of settling international disputes was the Permanent Court of Arbitration (PCA), which was created by the Hague Peace Conference of 1899. Initiated by the Russian Tsar Nicholas II, the conference involved all the world's major powers, as well as several smaller states, and resulted in the first multilateral treaties concerned with the conduct of warfare. Among these was the Convention for the Pacific Settlement of International Disputes, which set forth the institutional and procedural framework for arbitral proceedings, which would take place in The Hague, Netherlands. Although the proceedings would be supported by a permanent bureau—whose functions would be equivalent to that of a secretariat or court registry—the arbitrators would be appointed by the disputing states from a larger pool provided by each member of the convention. The PCA was established in 1900 and began proceedings in 1902.

A second Hague Peace Conference in 1907, which involved most of the world's sovereign states, revised the convention and enhanced the rules governing arbitral proceedings before the PCA. During this conference, the United States, Great Britain and Germany submitted a joint proposal for a permanent court whose judges would serve full-time. As the delegates could not agree how the judges would be selected, the matter was shelved pending an agreement to be adopted at a later convention.

The Hague Peace Conferences, and the ideas that emerged therefrom, influenced the creation of the Central American Court of Justice, which was established in 1908 as one of the earliest regional judicial bodies. Various plans and proposals were made between 1911 and 1919 for the establishment of an international judicial tribunal, which would not be realized in the formation of a new international system after World War I.

=== The Permanent Court of International Justice ===
The unprecedented bloodshed of the First World War led to the creation of the League of Nations, established by the Paris Peace Conference of 1919 as the first worldwide intergovernmental organization aimed at maintaining peace and collective security. Article 14 of the League of Nations Covenant called for the establishment of a Permanent Court of International Justice (PCIJ), which would be responsible for adjudicating any international dispute submitted to it by the contesting parties, and provide advisory opinions upon any disputes or questions referred to it by the League of Nations.

In December 1920, after several drafts and debates, the Assembly of the league unanimously adopted the statute of the PCIJ, which was signed and ratified in 1921 by a majority of members. Among other things, the new statute resolved the contentious issues of selecting judges by providing that the judges be elected by both the council and the Assembly of the league concurrently but independently. The makeup of the PCIJ would reflect the "main forms of civilization and the principal legal systems of the world". The PCIJ would be permanently placed at the Peace Palace in The Hague, alongside the Permanent Court of Arbitration.

The PCIJ represented a major innovation in international jurisprudence in several ways:

- Unlike previous international arbitral tribunals, it was a permanent body governed by its statutory provisions and rules of procedure
- It had a permanent registry that served as a liaison with governments and international bodies
- Its proceedings were largely public, including pleadings, oral arguments, and all documentary evidence
- It was accessible to all states and could be declared by states to have compulsory jurisdiction over disputes
- The PCIJ Statute was the first to list sources of law it would draw upon, which in turn became sources of international law
- Judges were more representative of the world and its legal systems than any prior international judicial body

Unlike the ICJ, the PCIJ was not part of the league, nor were members of the league automatically a party to its statute. The United States, which played a key role in both the second Hague Peace Conference and the Paris Peace Conference, was notably not a member of the league, but several of its nationals served as judges of the court.

From its first session in 1922 until 1940, the PCIJ dealt with 29 interstate disputes and issued 27 advisory opinions. Several hundred international treaties and agreements conferred jurisdiction upon the court over specified categories of disputes, reflecting the court's widespread acceptance. In addition to helping resolve several serious international disputes, the PCIJ helped clarify several ambiguities in international law that contributed to its development.

The United States played a major role in setting up the PCIJ but never joined. Presidents Woodrow Wilson, Warren G. Harding, Calvin Coolidge, Herbert Hoover and Franklin D. Roosevelt all supported membership, but did not get the two-thirds majority in the Senate required for a treaty.

=== Establishment of the International Court of Justice ===
Following a peak of activity in 1933, the PCIJ began to decline in its activities due to the era's growing international tension and isolationism. World War II effectively put an end to the court, which held its last public session in December 1939 and issued its last orders in February 1940. In 1942 the United States and United Kingdom jointly declared support for establishing or reestablishing an international court after the war, and in 1943, the UK chaired a panel of jurists from around the world, the "Inter-Allied Committee", to discuss the matter. Its 1944 report recommended that:

- The statute of any new international court be based on that of the PCIJ;
- The new court retain an advisory jurisdiction;
- Acceptance of the new court's jurisdiction be voluntary;
- The court deal only with judicial, not political matters.

Several months later at the Moscow conference in 1943, the major Allies—China, the USSR, the U.K., and the U.S.—issued a joint declaration recognizing the necessity "of establishing at the earliest practicable date a general international organization, based on the principle of the sovereign equality of all peace-loving States, and open to membership by all such States, large and small, for the maintenance of international peace and security".

The Allied conference at Dumbarton Oaks, in the United States, published a proposal in October 1944 calling for the establishment of an intergovernmental organization that included an international court. A meeting was convened in Washington, D.C., in April 1945, involving 44 jurists from around the world to draft a statute for the proposed court. The draft statute was substantially similar to that of the PCIJ, and it was questioned whether a new court should even be created. During the San Francisco Conference, which took place from 25 April to 26 June 1945 and involved 50 countries, it was decided that an entirely new court should be established as a principal organ of the new United Nations. The statute of this court would form an integral part of the United Nations Charter, which, to maintain continuity, expressly held that the Statute of the International Court of Justice (ICJ) was based upon that of the PCIJ.

Consequently, the PCIJ convened for the last time in October 1945 and resolved to transfer its archives to its successor, which would take its place at the Peace Palace. The judges of the PCIJ all resigned on 31 January 1946, with the election of the first members of the ICJ taking place in February at the first session of the United Nations General Assembly and Security Council. In April 1946, the PCIJ was formally dissolved, and the ICJ, in its first meeting, elected President José Gustavo Guerrero of El Salvador, who had served as the last president of the PCIJ. The court also appointed members of its Registry, mainly drawn from that of the PCIJ, and held an inaugural public sitting later that month.

The first case was submitted in May 1947 by the United Kingdom against Albania concerning incidents in the Corfu Channel.

== Activities ==
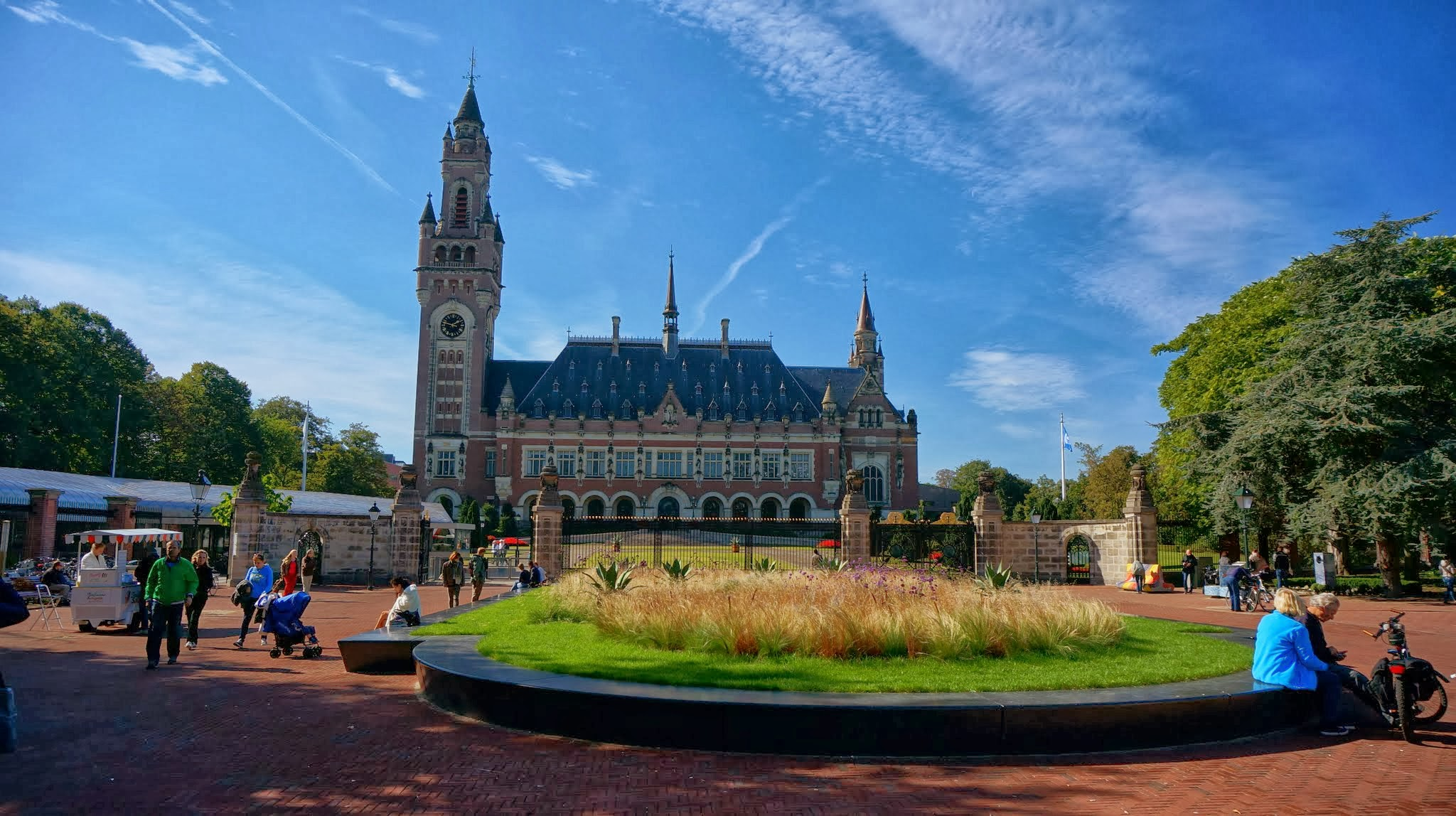
The Peace Palace in The Hague, Netherlands, seat of the ICJ

Established in 1945 by the UN Charter, the court began work in 1946 as the successor to the Permanent Court of International Justice. The Statute of the International Court of Justice, similar to that of its predecessor, is the main constitutional document constituting and regulating the court.

The court's workload covers a wide range of judicial activity. After the court ruled that the United States's covert war against Nicaragua was in violation of international law (Nicaragua v. United States), the United States withdrew from compulsory jurisdiction in 1986 to accept the court's jurisdiction only on a discretionary basis. Chapter XIV of the United Nations Charter authorizes the UN Security Council to enforce Court rulings, but such enforcement is subject to the veto power of the five permanent members of the council, which the United States used in the Nicaragua case.

== Composition ==
The ICJ comprises 15 judges elected to nine-year terms. Article 3 of its statute provides that no two judges may be nationals of the same country. According to Article 9, the membership of the court is supposed to represent the "main forms of civilization and of the principal legal systems of the world". This has been interpreted to include common law, civil law, socialist law, and Islamic law, while the precise meaning of "main forms of civilization" is contested.

There is an informal understanding that the seats will be distributed by geographic regions so that there are five seats for Western countries, three for African states (including one judge of Francophone civil law, one of Anglophone common law and one Arab), two for Eastern European states, three for Asian states and two for Latin American and Caribbean states. For most of the court's history, the five permanent members of the United Nations Security Council (France, the Soviet Union / Russia, China, the United Kingdom, and the United States) have had a judge serving, thereby occupying three of the Western seats, one of the Asian seats and one of the Eastern European seats, with some exceptions:

- There was no Chinese judge on the court from 1967 to 1985. In 1966, Chinese judge Wellington Koo was renominated, but his candidacy was withdrawn before the election, reportedly due to a lack of support as international recognition was shifting from the Republic of China to the People's Republic of China. After its assumption of China's UN seat in 1971, the PRC initially adopted a detached, wait-and-see approach toward the ICJ; no Chinese candidate was nominated until 1984.
- There has not been a British judge on the court since 2018. In 2017, British judge Sir Christopher Greenwood was renominated, but his candidacy was withdrawn during the election. He had been supported by the UN Security Council but failed to get a majority in the UN General Assembly. The Foreign Affairs Select Committee of the House of Commons assessed this as "a failure of UK diplomacy". Indian judge Dalveer Bhandari took the seat instead.
- There has not been a Russian judge on the court since 2024. In 2023, Russian judge Kirill Gevorgian, then vice-president of the court, was renominated but failed to get a majority in either the General Assembly or the Security Council. Observers drew a connection to Russia's invasion of Ukraine in 2022; Gevorgian had been one of two judges to dissent from the ICJ's Provisional Order to end it.

As of August 2026, only seven women have been elected to the court – the first, Rosalyn Higgins, only in 1995, half a century after the court’s founding. Former UN Special Rapporteur Philip Alston has called for states to take questions of representation on the bench seriously.

=== Nomination procedure ===
Nominations of candidates for election to the ICJ are made by individuals who sit on the Permanent Court of Arbitration (PCA). For this purpose, members of the PCA act in "national groups" (i.e. all the PCA members from any individual country). (In the case of UN member states not represented in the PCA, the state in question may select up to four individuals to be its "national group" for the purpose of nominating candidates to the ICJ.)

Every such "national group" may nominate up to four candidates, not more than two of whom shall be of their own nationality. Before making these nominations, each "national group" is recommended to consult its highest court of justice, its legal faculties and schools of law, and its national academies and national sections of international academies devoted to the study of law.

=== Election procedure ===
The election process is set out in Articles 4–12 of the ICJ Statute. Elections are staggered, with five judges elected every three years to ensure continuity within the court. If a judge dies or resigns before the end of the term, a special election is held to elect a judge to serve for the remainder of the term. Historically, such elections have generally replaced judges by judges from the same region but not necessarily from the same country.

The General Assembly and the Security Council proceed, independently of one another, to elect members of the court. To be elected, a candidate must obtain an absolute majority of votes both in the General Assembly and in the Security Council. The words "absolute majority" are interpreted as meaning a majority of all electors, whether or not they vote or are allowed to vote. In the General Assembly, all member states are electors, of which there are 193 as of July 2026, so that 97 votes constitute an absolute majority. In the Security Council, eight votes constitute an absolute majority, with no distinction made between permanent and non-permanent members of the council.

Only those candidates whose names appear on the ballot papers are eligible for election. On each ballot, each elector in the General Assembly and in the Security Council may vote for at most as many candidates as remain to be selected by that organ.

In each organ, if fewer candidates obtain an absolute majority of votes in a ballot than remained to be selected, further ballots are held during the same meeting, involving only candidates who have not obtained an absolute majority. If more candidates obtain an absolute majority in a ballot than remained to be selected, further ballots are held, involving all candidates, until the number of candidates enjoying an absolute majority is at most the number remaining to be selected.

When one of the organs has completed its selection, the president of that organ notifies the president of the other organ of the names of the selected candidates. The president of the latter does not communicate such names to the members of that organ until that organ has also completed its selection.

After both the General Assembly and the Security Council have completed their selections, the two lists are compared. Any candidate appearing on both lists is elected. But if fewer candidates have been thus elected than there are vacancies to be filled, the two organs proceed, again independently of one another, at a second meeting and, if necessary, a third meeting to elect candidates by further ballots for seats remaining vacant, the results again being compared after the required number of candidates have obtained an absolute majority in each organ.

If after the third meeting one or more seats still remain unfilled, the General Assembly and the Security Council may form a joint conference consisting of six members, three appointed by each organ. This joint conference may, by an absolute majority, agree upon one name for each seat still vacant and submit the name for the respective acceptance of the General Assembly and the Security Council. If the joint conference is unanimously agreed, it may submit the name of a person not included in the list of nominations, provided that candidate fulfils the required conditions of eligibility to be a judge on the ICJ. As of August 2026, a joint conference has never been convened. Instead, the assembly and the council have continued balloting in further meetings until the same candidate received an absolute majority of votes in both organs, usually after the weaker candidate withdrew.

If the joint conference also proves unable to complete the election, the judges of the ICJ who have already been elected shall proceed to fill the vacant seats by selection from among those candidates who have obtained votes either in the General Assembly or in the Security Council. In the event of a tie vote among the judges, the eldest judge shall have a casting vote.

=== Qualifications and independence ===
Article 2 of the statute provides that the judges shall be "elected regardless of their nationality from among persons of high moral character" who are either qualified for the highest judicial offices in their home states or known as lawyers with sufficient competence in international law. Judicial independence is dealt with specifically in Articles 16–18.

To ensure impartiality, Article 16 of the Charter provides that judges may not "exercise any political or administrative function, or engage in any other occupation of a professional nature", and Article 17 prohibits judges from participating "in the decision of any case in which [they have] previously taken part as agent, counsel, or advocate for one of the parties, or as a member of a national or international court, or of a commission of enquiry, or in any other capacity."

Judges of the International Court of Justice are entitled to the style of His/Her Excellency. Judges are not able to hold any other post or act as counsel. In practice, members of the court have their own interpretation of these rules and many have chosen to remain involved in outside arbitration and hold professional posts as long as there is no conflict of interest. Former judge Bruno Simma and current judge Georg Nolte have acknowledged that moonlighting should be restricted.

A judge can be dismissed only by a unanimous vote of the other members of the court. Despite these provisions, the independence of ICJ judges has been questioned. For example, during the Nicaragua case, the United States issued a communiqué suggesting that it could not present sensitive material to the court because of the presence of judges from the Soviet bloc.

=== Ad hoc judges ===
Article 31 of the statute sets out a procedure whereby ad hoc judges sit on contentious cases before the court. The system allows any party to a contentious case (if it otherwise does not have one of that party's nationals sitting on the court) to select one additional person to sit as a judge on that case only. It is thus possible that as many as seventeen judges may sit on one case.

The system may seem strange when compared with domestic court processes, but its purpose is to encourage states to submit cases. For example, if a state knows that it will have a judicial officer who can participate in deliberation and offer other judges local knowledge and an understanding of the state's perspective, it may be more willing to submit to the jurisdiction of the court. Although this system does not sit well with the judicial nature of the body, it is usually of little practical consequence. Ad hoc judges usually (but not always) vote in favour of the state that appointed them and thus cancel each other out.

=== Chambers ===
Generally, the court sits as full bench, but in the last 15 years it has occasionally sat as a chamber. Articles 26–29 of the statute allow the court to form smaller chambers, usually 3 or 5 judges, to hear cases. Two types of chambers are contemplated by Article 26: chambers for special categories of cases and ad hoc chambers to hear particular disputes. In 1993, a special chamber was established, under Article 26(1) of the ICJ statute, to deal specifically with environmental matters. It has never been used.

Ad hoc chambers are more frequently convened. For example, chambers were used to hear the Gulf of Maine Case (Canada/US). In that case, the parties made clear they would withdraw the case unless the court appointed judges to the chamber acceptable to the parties. Judgments of chambers may have less authority than full Court judgments or diminish the proper interpretation of universal international law informed by a variety of cultural and legal perspectives. On the other hand, the use of chambers may encourage greater recourse to the court and thus enhance international dispute resolution.

=== Current composition ===
As of 12 November 2025, the composition of the court is as follows:

Name	Nationality	Position	Term began	Term ends
Yuji Iwasawa	Japan	President (Note: For the 2024–2027 term) (Note: ICJ President Nawaf Salam resigned to assume the office of Prime Minister of Lebanon. Yuji Iwasawa was elected to fill the vacancy for the remainder of the term.)	2018	2030
Julia Sebutinde	Uganda	Vice-president	2012	2030
Peter Tomka	Slovakia	Member	2003	2030
Ronny Abraham	France	Member	2005	2027
Xue Hanqin	China	Member	2010	2030
Dalveer Bhandari	India	Member	2012	2027
Georg Nolte	Germany	Member	2021	2030
Hilary Charlesworth	Australia	Member	2021	2033
Leonardo Nemer Caldeira Brant	Brazil	Member	2022	2027
Juan Manuel Gómez Robledo Verduzco	Mexico	Member	2024	2033
Sarah Cleveland	United States	Member	2024	2033
Bogdan Aurescu	Romania	Member	2024	2033
Dire Tladi	South Africa	Member	2024	2033
Mahmoud Daifallah Hmoud	Jordan	Member	2025	2027
Phoebe Okowa	Kenya	Member	2025	2027
Philippe Gautier	Belgium	Registrar	2019	2026

=== Presidents ===
#	President	Start	End	Country
1	José Gustavo Guerrero	1946	1949	El Salvador
2	Jules Basdevant	1949	1952	France
3	Arnold McNair	1952	1955	United Kingdom
4	Green Hackworth	1955	1958	United States
5	Helge Klæstad	1958	1961	Norway
6	Bohdan Winiarski	1961	1964	Poland
7	Percy Spender	1964	1967	Australia
8	José Bustamante y Rivero	1967	1970	Peru
9	Muhammad Zafarullah Khan	1970	1973	Pakistan
10	Manfred Lachs	1973	1976	Poland
11	Eduardo Jiménez de Aréchaga	1976	1979	Uruguay
12	Humphrey Waldock	1979	1981	United Kingdom
13	Taslim Elias	1982	1985	Nigeria
14	Nagendra Singh	1985	1988	India
15	José Ruda	1988	1991	Argentina
16	Robert Jennings	1991	1994	United Kingdom
17	Mohammed Bedjaoui	1994	1997	Algeria
18	Stephen Schwebel	1997	2000	United States
19	Gilbert Guillaume	2000	2003	France
20	Shi Jiuyong	2003	2006	China
21	Rosalyn Higgins	2006	2009	United Kingdom
22	Hisashi Owada	2009	2012	Japan
23	Peter Tomka	2012	2015	Slovakia
24	Ronny Abraham	2015	2018	France
25	Abdulqawi Yusuf	2018	2021	Somalia
26	Joan Donoghue	2021	2024	United States
27	Nawaf Salam	2024	2025	Lebanon
28	Yuji Iwasawa	2025	2027	Japan

=== Registry ===
The function of the Court is supported by the Registry, an independent administrative organ that functions as the Court's permanent secretariat. The Registry consists of the Registrar, Deputy-Registrar, and other staff required for the performance of the Court's functions. The Registrar and Deputy-Registrar are elected by the Court by secret ballot for renewable seven-year terms. The Registrar serves as the Court's principal administrative officer and performs judicial, diplomatic, and administrative functions, including managing communications with parties, maintaining case records and archives, assisting the Court during proceedings and deliberations, overseeing publications and external relations, and directing the Registry's administration and finances. The Deputy-Registrar assists the Registrar and assumes the Registrar's functions in their absence or if the office becomes vacant.

The Registry is organized into three principal departments—Legal Matters, Linguistic Matters, and Information—together with divisions responsible for administration and personnel, archives, finance, publications, document production, the Court's library, security and general assistance, and information technology and communications. The Department of Linguistic Matters provides translation and interpretation in the Court's two official languages, English and French, while the Information Department handles public information, media relations and protocol. Other Registry divisions provide the financial, technical, logistical, archival and library services required for the Court's day-to-day operation.

The Department of Legal Matters includes Associate Legal Officers, who are professional Registry staff appointed on fixed-term contracts of up to four years and assigned individually to members of the Court to provide legal research and other assistance. The Court also offers fixed-term clerkships through its Judicial Fellows Programme, "a highly selective program that gives recent law graduates work experience as clerks at the ICJ in The Hague", in which "only a few of the world's most outstanding legal scholars are chosen." Esteemed alumni of the Judicial Fellows Programme include international human rights lawyer Amal Clooney, United Nations Special Rapporteur on the independence of judges and lawyers Margaret Satterthwaite, and University of Cambridge Professor Sandesh Sivakumaran.

==== Registrars ====
The following people have served as Registrars of the Court:

#	Registrar	Start	End	Country
1	Edvard Hambro	1946	1953	Norway
2	Julio López Oliván	1953	1960	Spain
3	Jean Garnier-Coignet	1960	1966	France
4	Stanislas Aquarone	1966	1980	Australia
5	Santiago Torres Bernárdez	1980	1986	Spain
6	Eduardo Valencia Ospina	1987	2000	Colombia
7	Philippe Couvreur	2000	2019	Belgium
8	Philippe Gautier	2019	2026	Belgium
9	Santiago Villalpando	2026		Argentina

== Jurisdiction ==
Parties upon becoming a UN member Parties prior to joining the UN under Article 93 UN observer states that are not parties

Per Article 93 of the UN Charter, all 193 UN members are automatically parties to the court's statute. Non-UN members may also become parties to the court's statute under the Article 93(2) procedure, which was used by Switzerland in 1948 and Nauru in 1988, before either joined the UN. Once a state is a party to the court's statute, it may participate in cases before the court. But being a party to the statute does not automatically give the court jurisdiction over disputes involving those parties. The issue of jurisdiction is considered in the three types of ICJ cases: contentious issues, incidental jurisdiction, and advisory opinions.

=== Contentious issues ===
First gathering after Second World War, Dutch newsreel from 1946

In contentious cases (adversarial proceedings seeking to settle a dispute), the ICJ produces a binding ruling between states that agree to submit to the ruling of the court. Only states may be parties in contentious cases; individuals, corporations, component parts of a federal state, NGOs, UN organs, and self-determination groups are excluded from direct participation, although the court may receive information from public international organizations. This does not preclude non-state interests from being the subject of proceedings; for example, a state may bring a case on behalf of one of its nationals or corporations, such as in matters concerning diplomatic protection.

Jurisdiction is often a crucial question for the court in contentious cases. The key principle is that the ICJ has jurisdiction only on the basis of consent. Under Article 36, there are four foundations for the court's jurisdiction:

1. Compromis or "special agreement", in which parties provide explicit consent to the court's jurisdiction by referring cases to it. While not true compulsory jurisdiction, this is perhaps the most effective jurisdictional basis, because the parties concerned have a desire for the dispute to be resolved by the court, and are thus more likely to comply with the court's judgment.
2. Compromissory clauses in a binding treaty. Most modern treaties contain such clauses to provide for dispute resolution by the ICJ. Cases founded on compromissory clauses have not been as effective as cases founded on special agreement, since a state may have no interest in having the matter examined by the court and may refuse to comply with a judgment. For example, during the Iran hostage crisis, Iran refused to participate in a case brought by the US based on a compromissory clause contained in the Vienna Convention on Diplomatic Relations and did not comply with the judgment. Since the 1970s, the use of such clauses has declined; many modern treaties set out their own dispute resolution regime, often based on forms of arbitration.
3. Optional clause declarations accepting the court's jurisdiction. Also known as Article 36(2) jurisdiction, it is sometimes misleadingly labeled "compulsory", though such declarations are voluntary. Many such declarations contain reservations that exclude from jurisdiction certain types of disputes (ratione materia). The principle of reciprocity may further limit jurisdiction, as Article 36(2) holds that such declaration may be made "in relation to any other State accepting the same obligation...". As of January 2018, seventy-four states had a declaration in force, up from sixty-six in February 2011; of the permanent Security Council members, only the United Kingdom has a declaration. In the court's early years, most declarations were made by industrialized countries. Since the 1986 Nicaragua case, declarations made by developing countries have increased, reflecting a growing confidence in the court. However, even those industrialized countries that have invoked optional declarations have sometimes increased exclusions or rescinded them altogether. Notable examples include the United States in the Nicaragua case, and Australia, which modified its declaration in 2002 to exclude disputes on maritime boundaries, most likely to prevent an impending challenge from East Timor, which gained independence two months later.
4. Article 36(5) provides for jurisdiction on the basis of declarations made under the Statute of the Permanent Court of International Justice. Article 37 similarly transfers jurisdiction under any compromissory clause in a treaty that gave jurisdiction to the PCIJ. Additionally, the court may have jurisdiction on the basis of tacit consent (forum prorogatum). In the absence of clear jurisdiction under Article 36, jurisdiction is established if the respondent accepts ICJ jurisdiction explicitly or simply pleads on the merits. This arose in the 1949 Corfu Channel Case (U.K. v. Albania), in which the court held that a letter from Albania stating that it submitted to the jurisdiction of the ICJ was sufficient to grant the court jurisdiction.

=== Incidental jurisdiction ===
Until rendering a final judgment, the court has competence to order interim measures for the protection of the rights of a party to a dispute. One or both parties to a dispute may apply the ICJ for interim measures. In the Frontier Dispute Case, both parties to the dispute, Burkina Faso and Mali, submitted an application to the court to indicate interim measures. Incidental jurisdiction of the court derives from the Article 41 of its statute. Like the final judgment, the order for interim measures of the court is binding on state parties to the dispute. The ICJ has competence to indicate interim measures only if the prima facie jurisdiction is satisfied.

=== Advisory opinions ===
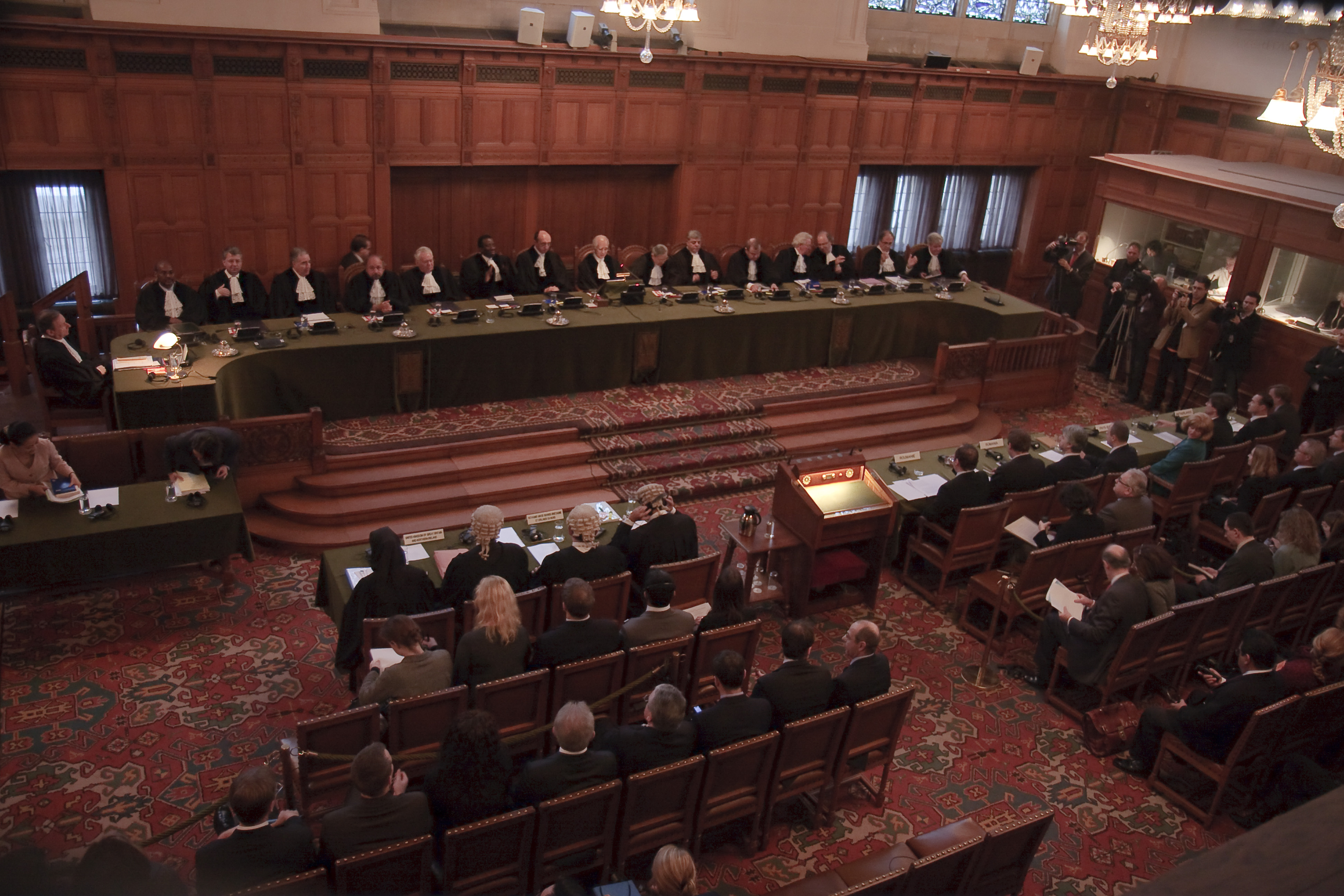
Audience of the "Accordance with International Law of the Unilateral Declaration of Independence by the Provisional Institutions of Self-Government of Kosovo"

An advisory opinion is a function of the court open only to specified United Nations bodies and agencies. The UN Charter grants the General Assembly or the Security Council the power to request the court to issue an advisory opinion on any legal question. Organs of the UN other than the General Assembly or the Security Council require the General Assembly's authorization to request an advisory opinion of the ICJ. These organs of the UN only request an advisory opinion regarding the matters that fall within the scope of their activities. On receiving a request, the court decides which states and organizations might provide useful information and gives them an opportunity to present written or oral statements. Advisory opinions were intended as a means by which UN agencies could seek the court's help in deciding complex legal issues that might fall under their respective mandates.

In principle, the court's advisory opinions are only consultative in character but they are influential and widely respected. Certain instruments or regulations can provide in advance that the advisory opinion shall be specifically binding on particular agencies or states, but inherently they are non-binding under the statute of the court. This non-binding character does not mean that advisory opinions are without legal effect, because the legal reasoning embodied in them reflects the court's authoritative views on important issues of international law. In arriving at them, the court follows essentially the same rules and procedures that govern its binding judgments delivered in contentious cases submitted to it by sovereign states.

An advisory opinion derives its status and authority from the fact that it is the official pronouncement of the principal judicial organ of the United Nations.

Advisory opinions have often been controversial because the questions asked are controversial or the case was pursued as an indirect way of bringing what is really a contentious case before the court. Examples of advisory opinions can be found in the section advisory opinions in the List of International Court of Justice cases article. One such well-known advisory opinion is the Nuclear Weapons Case.

On 23 July 2025, the court issued an advisory opinion regarding the State obligations in respect of climate change upon the General Assembly's request to address two questions: the obligations of States under international law to protect the climate system from anthropogenic emissions for States and for present and future generations, and the legal consequences when states, by their acts and omissions, cause significant harm to the climate system and other parts of the environment. This was the biggest case in the court's history, with 99 countries and more than 12 intergovernmental organizations heard over two weeks in December 2024.

== Examples of contentious cases ==
- 1980: A complaint by the United States that Iran was detaining American diplomats in Tehran in violation of international law.
- 1982: A dispute between Tunisia and Libya over the delimitation of the continental shelf between them.
- 1984: A dispute over the course of the maritime boundary dividing the U.S. and Canada in the Gulf of Maine area.
- 1989: A complaint by Iran after the shooting down of Iran Air Flight 655 by a United States Navy guided missile cruiser.
- 1999: A complaint by the Federal Republic of Yugoslavia against the member states of the North Atlantic Treaty Organization regarding their actions in the Kosovo War. This was denied on 15 December 2004 because of lack of jurisdiction, the FRY not being a party to the ICJ statute at the time it made the application.
- 2005: A complaint by the Democratic Republic of the Congo that its sovereignty had been violated by Uganda and that the DRC had lost billions of dollars' worth of resources. The case was decided in favour of the DRC.
- 2011: A complaint by the Republic of North Macedonia (former Yugoslav Republic of Macedonia) that Greece's vetoing of its accession to NATO violates the Interim Accord of 13 September 1995 between the two countries. The complaint was decided in favour of North Macedonia on 5 December 2011.
- 2017: A complaint by the Republic of India regarding a death penalty verdict against an Indian citizen, Kulbhushan Jadhav, by a Pakistani military court (based on alleged espionage and subversive activities).
- 2022: A complaint by Ukraine against Russia for violating the 1948 Genocide Convention, to which both Ukraine and Russia are parties, by falsely claiming genocide as a pretext for invading Ukraine. The International Association of Genocide Scholars supported Ukraine, who asked for expedited provisional measures directing Russia to halt its offensive. Russian representatives abstained from the court hearings. On 16 March, the ICJ ordered Russia to "immediately suspend the military operations", on a 13–2 vote with the Russian and Chinese judges in opposition. The order is binding on Russia, but the ICJ cannot enforce it.

== Relationship with the UN Security Council ==
Article 94 establishes the duty of all UN members to comply with decisions of the court involving them. If parties do not comply, the issue may be taken before the Security Council for enforcement action. There are obvious problems with such a method of enforcement. If the judgment is against one of the five permanent members of the Security Council or its allies, any resolution on enforcement could then be vetoed by that member. That occurred, for example, after the Nicaragua case, when Nicaragua brought the issue of the United States' noncompliance with the court's decision before the Security Council. Furthermore, if the Security Council refuses to enforce a judgment against any other state, there is no method of forcing the state to comply. Furthermore, the most effective form to take action for the Security Council, coercive action under Chapter VII of the United Nations Charter, can be justified only if international peace and security are at stake. The Security Council has never done that so far.

The relationship between the ICJ and the Security Council, and the separation of their powers, was considered by the court in 1992 in the Pan Am case. The court had to consider an application from Libya for the order of provisional measures of protection to safeguard its rights, which, it alleged, were being infringed by the threat of economic sanctions by the United Kingdom and United States. The problem was that these sanctions had been authorized by the Security Council, which resulted in a potential conflict between the Chapter VII functions of the Security Council and the judicial function of the court. The court decided, by eleven votes to five, that it could not order the requested provisional measures because the rights claimed by Libya, even if legitimate under the 1971 Montreal Convention, could not be prima facie regarded as appropriate since the action was ordered by the Security Council. In accordance with Article 103 of the UN Charter, obligations under the Charter took precedence over other treaty obligations. Nevertheless, the court declared the application admissible in 1998. A decision on the merits has not been given since the parties (United Kingdom, United States, and Libya) settled the case out of court in 2003.

There was a marked reluctance on the part of a majority of the court to become involved in a dispute in such a way as to bring it potentially into conflict with the council. The court stated in the Nicaragua case that there is no necessary inconsistency between action by the Security Council and adjudication by the ICJ. However, when there is room for conflict, the balance appears to be in favour of the Security Council.

Should either party fail "to perform the obligations incumbent upon it under a judgment rendered by the Court", the Security Council may be called upon to "make recommendations or decide upon measures" if the Security Council deems such actions necessary. In practice, the court's powers have been limited by the unwillingness of the losing party to abide by the court's ruling and by the Security Council's unwillingness to impose consequences. However, in theory, "so far as the parties to the case are concerned, a judgment of the Court is binding, final and without appeal", and "by signing the Charter, a State Member of the United Nations undertakes to comply with any decision of the International Court of Justice in a case to which it is a party."

For example, the United States accepted the court's compulsory jurisdiction upon its creation in 1946 but in 1984, after Nicaragua v. United States, withdrew its acceptance after the court's judgment called on the US to "cease and to refrain" from the "unlawful use of force" against the Nicaraguan government. The court ruled (with only the American judge dissenting) that the US was "in breach of its obligation under the Treaty of Friendship with Nicaragua not to use force against Nicaragua" and ordered the US to pay war reparations.

== Law applied ==
When deciding cases, the court applies international law as summarized in Article 38 of the ICJ Statute, which provides that in arriving at its decisions the court shall apply international conventions, international custom and the "general principles of law recognized by civilized nations." It may also refer to academic writing ("the teachings of the most highly qualified publicists of the various nations") and previous judicial decisions to help interpret the law although the court is not formally bound by its previous decisions under the doctrine of stare decisis. Article 59 makes clear that the common law notion of precedent or stare decisis does not apply to the decisions of the ICJ. The court's decision binds only the parties to that particular controversy. Under 38(1)(d), however, the court may consider its own previous decisions and frequently cites them.

If the parties agree, they may also grant the court the liberty to decide ex aequo et bono ("out of equality, and for the good"), granting the ICJ the freedom to make an equitable decision based on what is fair under the circumstances. As of January 2025, that provision has not been used in the court's history. As of September 2025, the International Court of Justice has dealt with 201 cases.

== Procedure ==
The ICJ is vested with the power to make its own rules. Court procedure is set out in the Rules of Court of the International Court of Justice 1978 (as amended on 29 September 2005).

Cases before the ICJ will follow a standard pattern. The case is lodged by the applicant, which files a written memorial setting out the basis of the court's jurisdiction and the merits of its claim. The respondent may accept the court's jurisdiction and file its own memorial on the merits of the case.

=== Preliminary objections ===
A respondent that does not wish to submit to the jurisdiction of the court may raise preliminary objections. Any such objections must be ruled upon before the court can address the merits of the applicant's claim. Often, a separate public hearing is held on the preliminary objections and the court will render a judgment. Respondents normally file preliminary objections to the jurisdiction of the court and/or the admissibility of the case. Inadmissibility refers to a range of arguments about factors the court should take into account in deciding jurisdiction, such as the fact that the issue is not justiciable or that it is not a "legal dispute".

In addition, objections may be made because all necessary parties are not before the court. If the case necessarily requires the court to rule on the rights and obligations of a state that has not consented to the court's jurisdiction, the court does not proceed to issue a judgment on the merits.

If the court decides it has jurisdiction and the case is admissible, the respondent then is required to file a Memorial addressing the merits of the applicant's claim. Once all written arguments are filed, the court holds a public hearing on the merits.

Once a case has been filed, any party (usually the applicant) may seek an order from the court to protect the status quo pending the hearing of the case. Such orders are known as Provisional (or Interim) Measures and are analogous to interlocutory injunctions in United States law. Article 41 of the statute allows the court to make such orders. The court must be satisfied to have prima facie jurisdiction to hear the merits of the case before it grants provisional measures.

=== Applications to intervene ===
In cases in which a third state's interests are affected, that state may be permitted to intervene in the case and participate as a full party. Under Article 62, a state "with an interest of a legal nature" may apply; however, it is within the court's discretion whether or not to allow the intervention. Intervention applications are rare, and the first successful application occurred only in 1991.

=== Judgment and remedies ===
Once deliberation has taken place, the court issues a majority opinion. In the event of an equal division, the president's vote decides, as it did in one of the votes in the case Legality of the Threat or Use of Nuclear Weapons.

Judges may issue concurring opinions (if they agree with the outcome reached in the judgment of the court but differ in their reasoning) or dissenting opinions (if they disagree with the majority), either individually or jointly.

No appeal is possible, but any party may ask for the court to clarify whether there is a dispute as to the meaning or scope of the court's judgment.

== Criticisms ==
The International Court has been criticized with respect to its rulings, its procedures, and its authority. As with criticisms of the United Nations, many critics and opponents of the court refer to the general authority assigned to the body by member states through its Charter, rather than to specific problems with the composition of judges or their rulings. Major criticisms include the following:

- "Compulsory" jurisdiction is limited to cases where both parties have agreed to submit to its decision, and so instances of aggression tend to be automatically escalated to and adjudicated by the Security Council. ICJ rulings are legally binding on states but not enforceable without their approval or compliance.
- The International Court does not enjoy a full separation of powers, with permanent members of the Security Council being able to veto enforcement of cases, even those to which they consented to be bound. Because the jurisdiction does not have binding force itself, in many cases, the instances of aggression are adjudicated by Security Council by adopting a resolution, etc. There is, therefore, a likelihood for the permanent member states of Security Council to avoid the legal responsibility brought up by International Court of Justice, as shown in the example of Nicaragua v. United States.
- The court has been accused of judicial parsimony, with its rulings tending to dismiss submissions of parties on jurisdictional grounds and not resolving the underlying dispute between them.
- The court has been accused of exhibiting a political bias, with past research finding "strong evidence" that judges at the ICJ "favour the state that appoints them", "favour states whose wealth level is close to that of the judges' own state", and "favour states whose political system is similar to that of the judges' own state."

== See also ==
- International Criminal Court
- International Criminal Tribunal for Rwanda
- International Criminal Tribunal for the former Yugoslavia
- International Tribunal for the Law of the Sea
- List of treaties that confer jurisdiction on the International Court of Justice
- Provisional measure of protection
- Supranational aspects of international organizations
- Universal jurisdiction
