= EDL =

EDL may refer to:

== Politics ==
- English Defence League, a defunct English far-right organisation.
  - European Defence League, an offshoot organization of the English Defence League
  - English Disco Lovers, an internet movement to lower the search ranking of EDL as the English Defence League
- Estonian Defence League, an Estonian voluntary militarily organized national defence organisation
- European Democratic Lawyers, a labour union
- European Day of Languages, an annual event aimed at encouraging language learning in Europe

== Technology ==
- Edit decision list
- Electrical double layer
- Entry, descent and landing (rocketry)
- Event Driven Language, a computer language for the IBM Series/1 Event Driven Executive operating system
- Experiment Description Language, a computer language for the program Fsc2 for controlling spectrometers
- Eye Dome Lighting is a non-photorealistic, image-based shading technique
- Qualcomm EDL mode, a debugging feature in SoCs from Qualcomm

== Transport ==
- Edale railway station, in England
- Eldoret International Airport, in Kenya
- Johor Bahru Eastern Dispersal Link Expressway, a highway in Johor, Malaysia

== Medicine ==
- Essential Drugs List, also known as a list of essential medicines

== Other uses ==
- Electricité Du Liban, a Lebanese electrical utility
- Electricité du Laos, the state electrical utility of Laos
- Electricity Distribution Lanka, a state-owned utility company in Sri Lanka
- Electronic Defense Laboratories, a defunct American defense company
- Enhanced Drivers License, in North America
- Every Day Life, an American rapcore group
