= United States Deputy Secretary of Defense =

Second highest-ranking DoD official

- Seal of the department (Note: Executive Order 14347 authorized the usage of "Department of War" as a secondary name (which is now preferred by the department), and per 10 U.S. Code § 112, the secretary of defense may institute a new seal with the approval of POTUS, without Congressional approval.)

- Flag of the deputy secretary

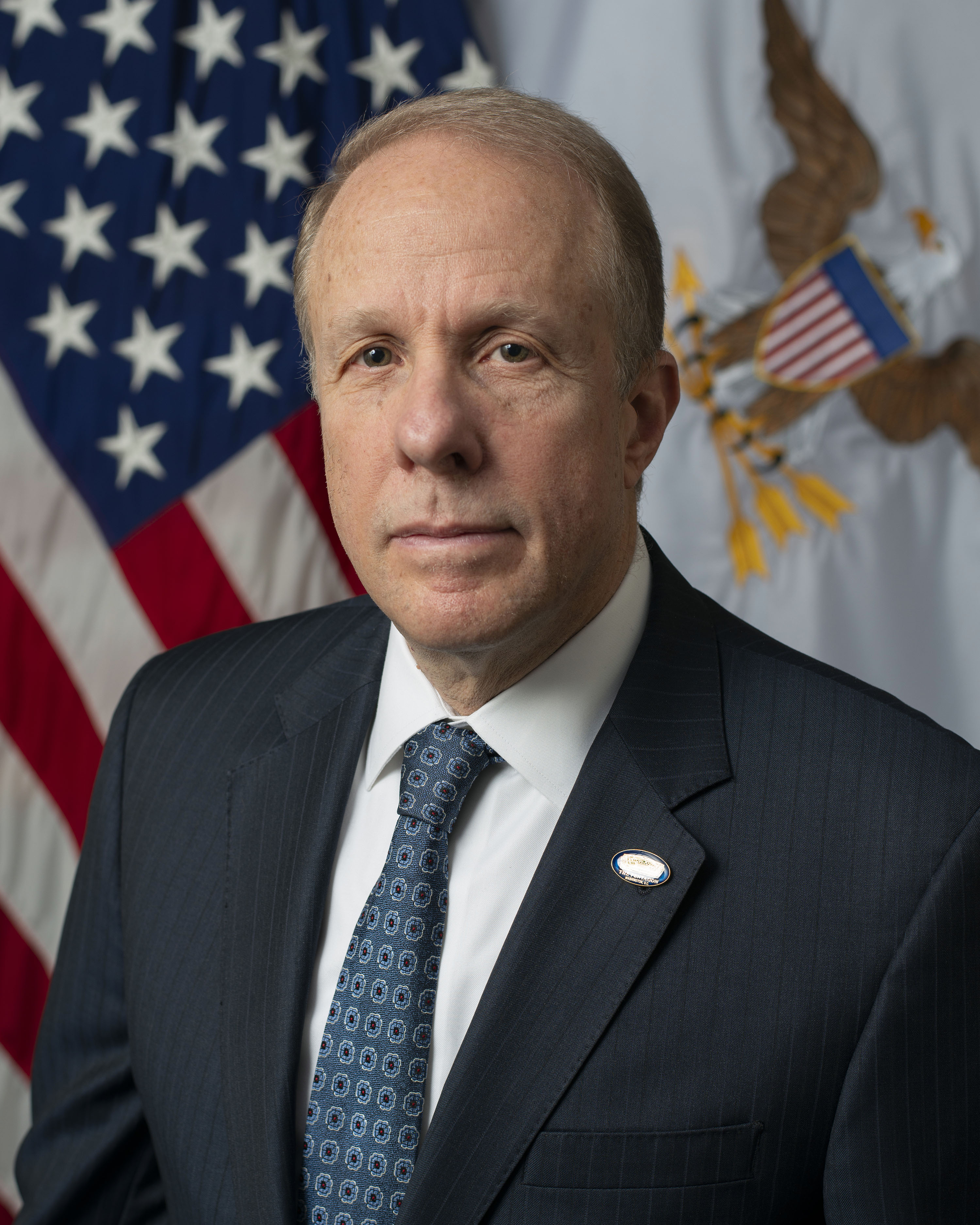
- Incumbent; Steve Feinberg since March 17, 2025
- Department of Defense; Office of the Secretary
- Style: Mister/Madam Deputy Secretary (informal); The Honorable (formal)
- Status: Chief operating officer
- Reports to: Secretary
- Seat: The Pentagon, Arlington County, Virginia
- Appointer: The president; with Senate advice and consent
- Term length: No fixed term
- Constituting instrument: 10 U.S.C. § 132
- Formation: 1949
- First holder: Stephen Early; May 2, 1949
- Succession: 1st in SecDef succession
- Salary: Executive Schedule, level II
- Website: www.war.gov

The deputy secretary of defense (acronym: DepSecDef), secondarily but informally titled the deputy secretary of war (DepSecWar), is a statutory office (10 U.S.C. § 132) and the second-highest-ranking official in the United States Department of Defense.

The deputy secretary is the principal civilian deputy to the secretary of defense, and is appointed by the president, with the advice and consent of the Senate. The deputy secretary, by statute, is designated as the DoD chief management officer and must be a civilian, at least seven years removed from service as a commissioned officer on active-duty at the date of appointment.

== History ==
Pub. L. 81–36, April 2, 1949, originally established this position as the under secretary of defense, however Pub. L. 81–216 August 10, 1949, a.k.a. the 1949 Amendments to the National Security Act of 1947, changed the title to deputy secretary of defense. Former assistant to President Franklin D. Roosevelt, Stephen Early, became the first officer holder when he was sworn in on May 2, 1949.

Pub. L. 92–596, October 27, 1972, established a second deputy secretary of defense position, with both deputies performing duties as prescribed by the secretary of defense. The second deputy position was not filled until December 1975. Robert Ellsworth, serving from December 23, 1975, until January 10, 1977, was the only one to ever hold that office. Pub. L. 95–140, October 21, 1977, established two under secretaries of defense and abolished the second deputy position.

== Responsibilities ==
By delegation, the deputy secretary of defense has full power and authority to act for the secretary of defense and to exercise the powers of the secretary of defense on any and all matters for which the secretary is authorized to act pursuant to statute or executive order. The deputy secretary is first in the line of succession to the secretary of defense.

The typical role of the deputy secretary of defense is to oversee the day-to-day business and lead the internal management processes of the $500-billion-plus Department of Defense budget, that is as its chief operating officer; while the secretary of defense as the chief executive officer focuses on the big issues of the day, ongoing military operations, high-profile congressional hearings, attending meetings of the National Security Council, and directly advising the president on defense issues.

Prior to February 1, 2018, the deputy secretary of defense also served as the department's chief management officer, to whom the deputy chief management officer reported, but those responsibilities were split into a new chief management officer of the Department of Defense position (disestablished on 1 January 2021).

The deputy secretary, among the office's many responsibilities, chairs the Senior Level Review Group (SLRG), before 2005 known as Defense Resources Board (DRB), which provides department-wide budgetary allocation recommendations to the secretary and the president. Traditionally, the deputy secretary has been the civilian official guiding the process of the Quadrennial Defense Review (QDR).

The deputy secretary of defense chairs the Special Access Program Oversight Committee (SAPOC), which has oversight responsibilities and provides recommendations with respect to changes in status of the department's Special Access Programs, for either the deputy secretary defense or the secretary of defense to make.

== List of deputy secretaries of defense ==
No.	Image	Name	Term of office			Serving under Secretaries of Defense	Appointed by President
No.	Image	Name	Began	Ended	Time in office	Serving under Secretaries of Defense	Appointed by President
1		Stephen Early	May 2, 1949; August 10, 1949	August 9, 1949 (Note: As "Under Secretary of Defense"); September 30, 1950 (Note: As "Deputy Secretary of Defense")	1 year, 151 days	Louis A. Johnson; George C. Marshall	Harry S. Truman
2		Robert A. Lovett	October 4, 1950	September 16, 1951	316 days	George C. Marshall	Harry S. Truman
3		William Chapman Foster	September 24, 1951	January 20, 1953	1 year, 118 days	Robert A. Lovett	Harry S. Truman
4		Roger M. Kyes	February 2, 1953	May 1, 1954	1 year, 88 days	Charles Erwin Wilson	Dwight D. Eisenhower
5		Robert B. Anderson	May 3, 1954	August 4, 1955	1 year, 93 days	Charles Erwin Wilson	Dwight D. Eisenhower
6		Reuben B. Robertson Jr.	August 5, 1955	April 25, 1957	1 year, 263 days	Charles Erwin Wilson	Dwight D. Eisenhower
7		Donald A. Quarles	May 1, 1957	May 8, 1959	2 years, 7 days	Charles Erwin Wilson; Neil H. McElroy	Dwight D. Eisenhower
8		Thomas S. Gates Jr.	June 8, 1959	December 1, 1959	176 days	Neil H. McElroy	Dwight D. Eisenhower
9		James H. Douglas Jr.	December 11, 1959	January 24, 1961	1 year, 44 days	Thomas S. Gates Jr. Robert McNamara	Dwight D. Eisenhower
10		Roswell Gilpatric	January 24, 1961	January 20, 1964	2 years, 361 days	Robert McNamara	John F. Kennedy
11		Cyrus Vance	January 28, 1964	June 30, 1967	3 years, 153 days	Robert McNamara	Lyndon B. Johnson
12		Paul Nitze	July 1, 1967	January 20, 1969	1 year, 203 days	Robert McNamara; Clark Clifford	Lyndon B. Johnson
13		David Packard	January 24, 1969	December 13, 1971	2 years, 323 days	Melvin Laird	Richard Nixon
14		Kenneth Rush	February 23, 1972	January 29, 1973	341 days	Melvin Laird	Richard Nixon
15		Bill Clements	January 30, 1973	January 20, 1977	3 years, 356 days	Elliot Richardson; James R. Schlesinger; Donald Rumsfeld	Richard Nixon
16		Robert Ellsworth	December 23, 1975	January 10, 1977	1 year, 18 days	Donald Rumsfeld	Gerald Ford
17		Charles Duncan Jr.	January 31, 1977	July 26, 1979	2 years, 176 days	Harold Brown	Jimmy Carter
18		W. Graham Claytor Jr.	August 24, 1979	January 16, 1981	1 year, 145 days	Harold Brown	Jimmy Carter
19		Frank Carlucci	February 4, 1981	December 31, 1982	1 year, 330 days	Caspar Weinberger	Ronald Reagan
20		W. Paul Thayer	January 12, 1983	January 4, 1984	357 days	Caspar Weinberger	Ronald Reagan
21		William Howard Taft IV	February 3, 1984	April 22, 1989	5 years, 78 days	Caspar Weinberger; Frank Carlucci; Dick Cheney	Ronald Reagan
22		Donald J. Atwood Jr.	April 24, 1989	January 20, 1993	3 years, 271 days	Dick Cheney	George H. W. Bush
23		William Perry	March 5, 1993	February 3, 1994	335 days	Les Aspin	Bill Clinton
24		John M. Deutch	March 11, 1994	May 10, 1995	1 year, 60 days	William Perry	Bill Clinton
25		John P. White	June 22, 1995	July 15, 1997	2 years, 23 days	William Perry; William Cohen	Bill Clinton
26		John Hamre	July 29, 1997	March 31, 2000	2 years, 246 days	William Cohen	Bill Clinton
27		Rudy de Leon	March 31, 2000	March 1, 2001	335 days	William Cohen; Donald Rumsfeld	Bill Clinton
28		Paul Wolfowitz	March 2, 2001	May 13, 2005	4 years, 72 days	Donald Rumsfeld	George W. Bush
29		Gordon R. England	May 13, 2005; January 4, 2006	January 3, 2006 (Note: Served as Acting Deputy Secretary of Defense); February 11, 2009	236 days 1134	Donald Rumsfeld; Robert Gates	George W. Bush
30		William J. Lynn III	February 12, 2009	October 5, 2011	2 years, 235 days	Robert Gates; Leon Panetta	Barack Obama
31		Ash Carter	October 6, 2011	December 4, 2013	2 years, 58 days	Leon Panetta; Chuck Hagel	Barack Obama
—		Christine Fox; Acting	December 5, 2013	May 1, 2014	149 days	Chuck Hagel	Barack Obama
32		Robert O. Work	May 1, 2014	July 14, 2017	3 years, 74 days	Chuck Hagel; Ash Carter; Jim Mattis	Barack Obama
33		Patrick M. Shanahan	July 19, 2017	June 23, 2019	1 year, 339 days	Jim Mattis; Himself (acting)	Donald Trump
—		David Norquist; Acting	January 1, 2019	July 23, 2019	203 days	Patrick M. Shanahan (acting); Mark Esper (acting); Richard V. Spencer (acting)	Donald Trump
—		Richard V. Spencer; Acting	July 23, 2019	July 31, 2019	8 days	Mark Esper	Donald Trump
34		David Norquist	July 31, 2019	February 8, 2021	1 year, 192 days	Mark Esper; Lloyd Austin	Donald Trump
35		Kathleen Hicks	February 8, 2021	January 20, 2025	3 years, 347 days	Lloyd Austin	Joe Biden
—		Robert G. Salesses; Acting	January 28, 2025	March 17, 2025	48 days	Pete Hegseth	Donald Trump
36		Stephen Feinberg	March 17, 2025	Incumbent	1 year, 189 days	Pete Hegseth	Donald Trump

== See also ==
- Defense Acquisition Board
- Defense Policy Board Advisory Committee
- Deputy's Advisory Working Group, a panel chaired by the deputy secretary of defense
- Packard Commission
