= William J. Perry =

American mathematician, businessman and 19th US Secretary of Defense

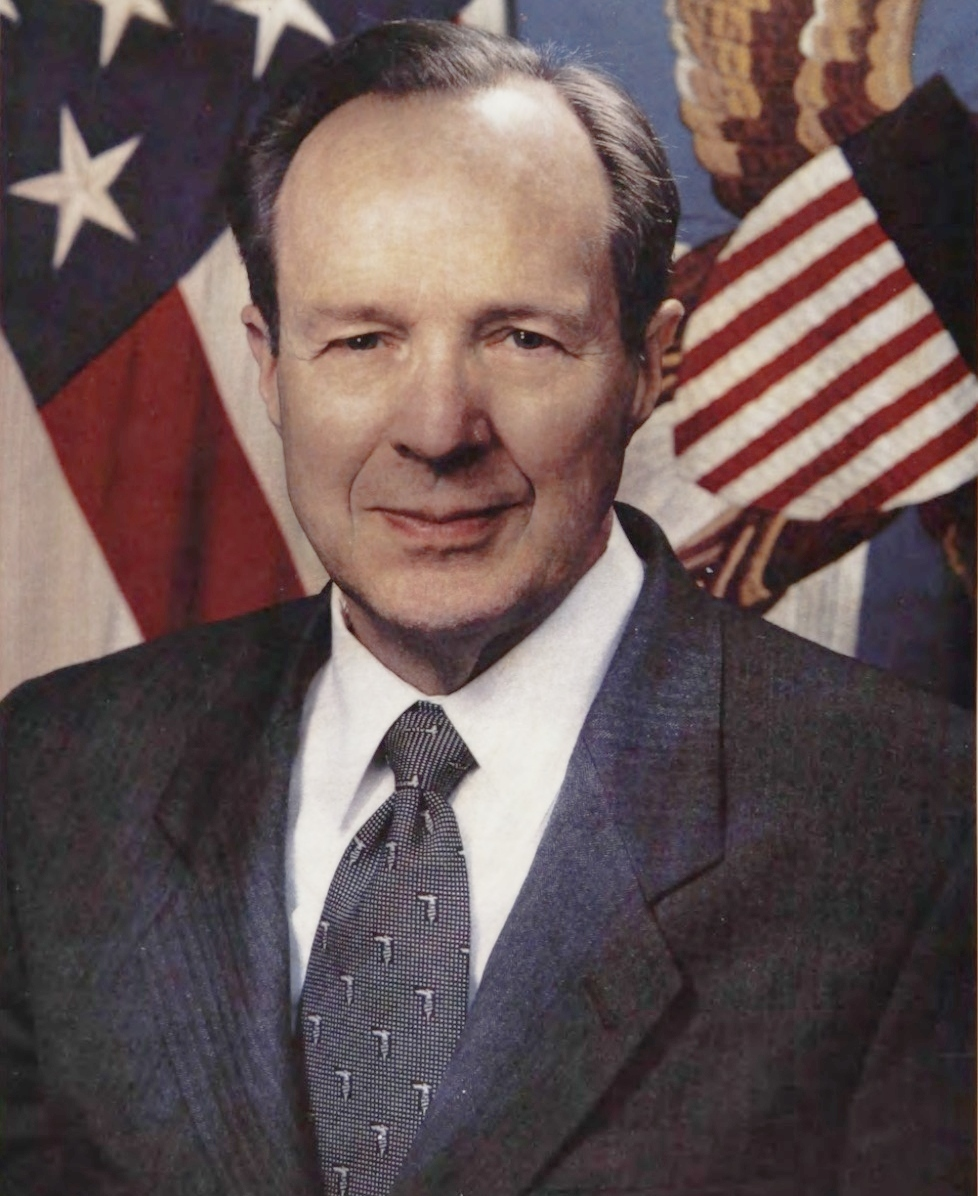
- Official portrait, 1994

19th United States Secretary of Defense
- In office February 3, 1994 – January 23, 1997
- President: Bill Clinton
- Deputy: John M. Deutch; John P. White
- Preceded by: Les Aspin
- Succeeded by: William Cohen

23rd United States Deputy Secretary of Defense
- In office March 5, 1993 – February 3, 1994
- President: Bill Clinton
- Preceded by: Donald J. Atwood Jr.
- Succeeded by: John M. Deutch

Under Secretary of Defense for Research and Engineering
- In office April 11, 1977 – January 20, 1981
- President: Jimmy Carter
- Preceded by: Malcolm R. Currie
- Succeeded by: Richard DeLauer

Personal details
- Born: William James Perry; October 11, 1927 (age 99) Vandergrift, Pennsylvania, U.S.
- Party: Democratic
- Spouse: Leonilla Green (died 2017)
- Children: 5
- Education: Stanford University (BA, MA); Pennsylvania State University (PhD)

Military service
- Branch/service: United States Army
- Years of service: 1945–1947 (active); 1950–1955 (reserve)
- Rank: Second Lieutenant (reserve)
- Unit: United States Army Corps of Engineers; United States Army Reserve

William James Perry (born October 11, 1927) is an American mathematician, engineer, businessman, and civil servant who was the United States Secretary of Defense from February 3, 1994, to January 23, 1997, under President Bill Clinton. He also served as Deputy Secretary of Defense (1993–1994) and Under Secretary of Defense for Research and Engineering (1977–1981).

Perry is the Michael and Barbara Berberian Professor (emeritus) at Stanford University, with a joint appointment at the Freeman Spogli Institute for International Studies and the School of Engineering. He is also a senior fellow at Stanford University's Hoover Institution. He is the co-founder of the Palo Alto Unitarian Church and serves as director of the Preventive Defense Project. He is an expert in U.S. foreign policy, national security and arms control. In 2013 he founded the William J. Perry Project, a non-profit effort to educate the public on the current dangers of nuclear weapons.

Perry also has extensive business experience and serves on the boards of several high-tech companies. He was elected a member of the National Academy of Engineering in 1970 for contributions to communications theory, radio propagation theory, and computer technology in the design of advanced systems. He is also a fellow of the American Academy of Arts and Sciences. Among Perry's numerous awards are the Presidential Medal of Freedom (1997) and the Grand Cordon of the Order of the Rising Sun (2002), awarded by Japan.

== Early life ==
Born in Vandergrift, Pennsylvania, Perry attended, but did not graduate from Culver Military Academy. He graduated from Butler Senior High School in 1945 and served in the United States Army as an enlisted man from 1946 to 1947, including service in the Occupation of Japan. Perry later received a commission in the United States Army Reserve through ROTC, serving from 1950 to 1955.

Perry received his B.S. (1949) and M.A. (1950) degrees from Stanford University and a Ph.D. in mathematics from Pennsylvania State University in 1957.

== Early career ==
From 1954 to 1964 Perry was director of the Electronic Defense Laboratories of Sylvania/GTE in California, and from 1964 to 1977 president of Electromagnetic Systems Laboratory (ESL), Incorporated, an electronics firm that he founded. He was instrumental in demonstrating the technical feasibility of extracting Signals intelligence on the Soviet Union from the overall Rf background with the then proposed Rhyolite/Aquacade surveillance program. In 1967 he was hired as a technical consultant to the Department of Defense.

=== Undersecretary of Defense for R&E ===
From 1977 to 1981, during the Jimmy Carter administration, Perry served as Undersecretary of Defense for Research and Engineering, where he had responsibility for weapon systems procurement and research and development. Among other achievements, he had an influence on the development of the AirLand Battle doctrine, and was instrumental in the development of stealth aircraft technology, specifically the Lockheed F-117 Nighthawk.

== Mid-career ==
On leaving the Pentagon in 1981, Perry became managing director until 1985 of Hambrecht & Quist, a San Francisco investment banking firm "specializing in high-tech and defense companies."

He was appointed by President Ronald Reagan in 1983 to serve on the President's Commission on Strategic Forces. He was also a member of the Packard Commission.

Later in the 1980s he held positions as founder and chairman of Technology Strategies Alliances, professor in the School of Engineering at Stanford University, and served as a co-director of the Preventive Defense Project at the Stanford University Center for International Security and Cooperation.

=== Deputy Secretary of Defense ===
Perry returned to the Pentagon as Deputy Secretary of Defense after being nominated by Bill Clinton on February 3, 1993,

The "frenzy" of defense industry mergers that the US experienced after 1986 was encouraged when in autumn 1993, Perry and his boss Les Aspin invited two dozen industry executives to a dinner "in the secretary's dining room next to his office". The two Secretaries urged their guests to combine into a few, larger companies because Pentagon budget cuts would endanger at least half of the contractors represented there. The event would come to be known as the "Last Supper".

== Secretary of Defense ==
Perry's boss as Deputy Secretary, Secretary Les Aspin, was not a good fit for the job and within a year tendered his resignation. Perry succeeded him after a two-month search. The same day of his confirmation hearing, Perry was confirmed by a unanimous (97-0) vote to become Defense Secretary.

He entered office with broad national security experience, both in industry and government and with an understanding of the challenges that he faced. A hands-on manager, he paid attention both to internal operations in the Pentagon and to international security issues. He worked closely with his deputy secretaries (John M. Deutch, 1994–95, and John P. White, 1995–97), and he met regularly with the service secretaries, keeping them informed and seeking their advice on issues. He described his style as "management by walking around."

Perry adopted "preventive defense" as his guide to national security policy in the post-Cold War world. During the Cold War the United States had relied on deterrence rather than prevention as the central principle of its security strategy. Perry outlined three basic tenets of a preventive strategy: keep threats from emerging; deter those that actually emerged; and if prevention and deterrence failed, defeat the threat with military force. In practical terms this strategy relied on threat reduction programs (reducing the nuclear complex of the former Soviet Union), counter-proliferation efforts, the NATO Partnership for Peace and expansion of the alliance, and the maintenance of military forces and weapon systems ready to fight if necessary. To carry out this strategy, Perry thought it necessary to maintain a modern, ready military force, capable of fighting two major regional wars at the same time.

=== Defense budget ===
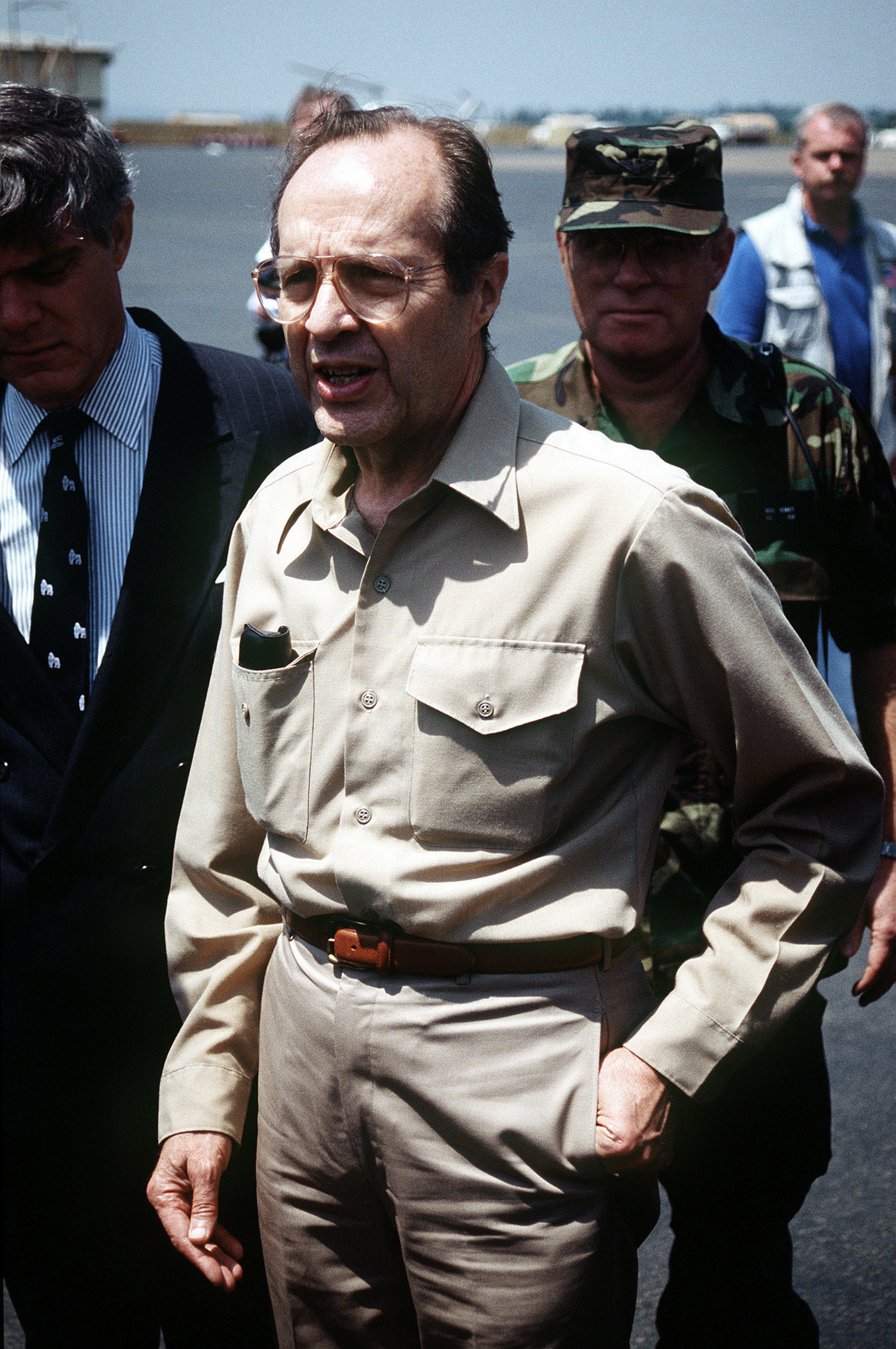
Perry in Rwanda, 1994.

The formulation of the Defense budget and shepherding it through Congress was one of Perry's most important duties. The problem of how to deal with a large projected Defense budget shortfall from 1995 to 2000, an issue that weakened Perry's predecessor Les Aspin and contributed to his resignation, persisted when Perry took office. Immediately on presenting his 1995 budget request, which he termed "a post-Cold War budget," Perry stated that Defense required a few more years of downsizing and that its infrastructure needed streamlining as well. The proposal, he said, maintained a ready-to-fight force, redirected a modernization program (including a strong research and development program), initiated a program to do business differently (acquisition reform), and reinvested defense dollars in the economy.

Perry asked for $252.2 billion for FY 1995, including funds for numerous weapon systems, such as a new aircraft carrier, three Aegis cruisers, and six C-17 cargo aircraft. The budget projected a further cut of 85,500 in active duty military personnel, leaving a force of 1.52 million. Ultimately Congress provided $253.9 billion TOA, about $2 billion more than in FY 1994, but actually a 1.2% cut in inflation-adjusted growth.

In February 1995, Perry asked for $246 billion for the Department of Defense for FY 1996. This proposal became entangled in the controversy during 1995 over the House Republicans' Contract with America, their efforts to spend more on defense than the administration wanted, and the continuing need for deficit reduction.

Perry cautioned Congress in September of the possibility that President Clinton would veto the FY 1996 Defense budget bill because Congress had added $7 billion in overall spending, mainly for weapon systems that the Defense Department did not want, and because of restrictions on contingency operations Congress had put in the bill. Three months later he recommended that the president veto the bill. When Congress and the administration finally settled on a budget compromise midway through FY 1996, DoD received $254.4 billion TOA, slightly more than in FY 1995, but in terms of real growth a 2% cut.

The question of a national missile defense system figured prominently in the budget struggles Perry experienced. Aspin had declared an end to the Strategic Defense Initiative program, but long-standing supporters both inside and outside of Congress called for its resurrection, especially when the Defense budget came up. Perry rejected calls for revival of SDI, arguing that the money would be better spent on battlefield antimissile defenses and force modernization, that the United States at the moment did not face a real threat, and that if the system were built and deployed it would endanger the Strategic Arms Reduction Talks with the Russians. The secretary was willing to continue funding development work on a national system, so that if a need emerged the United States could build and deploy it in three years. President Clinton signed the FY 1996 Defense bill early in 1996 only after Congress agreed to delete funding for a national missile defense system.

Shortly before he introduced his FY 1997 budget request in March 1996, Perry warned that the United States might have to give up the strategy of preparing for two major regional conflicts if the armed forces suffered further reductions. The Five-Year Modernization Plan Perry introduced in March 1996 reflected his basic assumptions that the Defense budget would not decline in FY 1997 and would grow thereafter; that DoD would realize significant savings from infrastructure cuts, most importantly base closings; and that other savings would come by contracting out many support activities and reforming the defense acquisition system.

For FY 1997 the Clinton administration requested a DoD appropriation of $242.6 billion, about 6% less in inflation-adjusted dollars than the FY 1996 budget. The budget proposal delayed modernization for another year, even though the administration earlier had said it would recommend increased funding for new weapons and equipment for FY 1997. The proposal included advance funding for contingency military operations, which had been financed in previous years through supplemental appropriations. Modest real growth in the Defense budget would not begin until FY 2000 under DoD's six-year projections. The procurement budget would increase during the period from $38.9 billion (FY 1997) to $60.1 billion (FY 2001). For FY 1997 Congress eventually provided $244 billion TOA, including funds for some weapon systems not wanted by the Clinton administration.

Although he had not thought so earlier, by the end of his tenure in early 1997 Perry believed it possible to modernize the U.S. armed forces within a balanced federal budget. Perry argued for the current force level of just under 1.5 million as the minimum needed by the United States to maintain its global role. Further reductions in the Defense budget after 1997 would require cuts in the force structure and make it impossible for the United States to remain a global power.

=== Streamlining the military infrastructure ===
Perry devoted much time to restructuring defense acquisition policy and procedure, pursuing measures on acquisition reform begun when he was deputy secretary. Six days after he became secretary Perry released a document that laid out a variety of proposed acquisition procedure changes, including simplification of purchases under $100,000; maximum reliance on existing commercial products; conforming military contracts, bidding, accounting, and other business procedures to commercial practices when possible; eliminating outdated regulations that delayed purchases; and announcing military purchase requirements on data interchanges normally used by private business to increase vendor competition.

In June 1994 the secretary signed a directive ordering the armed forces to buy products and components to the extent possible from commercial off-the-shelf sources (his phrase was "commercial state-of-the-art technology"), rather than from defense contractors, signaling a major departure from the traditional "milspec" over 30,000 military specifications and standards that actually inflated the cost of military items.

In March 1996 Perry approved a new DoD comprehensive acquisition policy that emphasized commercial practices and products. Program managers and other acquisition officials would have the power to use their professional judgment in purchasing. The plan canceled more than 30 separate acquisition policy memoranda and report formats and replaced existing policy documents with new ones that were about 90% shorter. Perry considered these reforms one of his most important accomplishments, and saw savings generated by the new practices as part of the key to adequate funding of the military in an era of continuing tight budgets.

A token of the Perry agenda's power is the 1995 merger between Lockheed Corporation and Martin Marietta. The resulting company, Lockheed Martin, is still as of 2024 the largest defense contractor on the planet. Another token is the third-ranked Northrop Grumman company, which was formed in 1994 when Northrop Corporation purchased Grumman Corporation.

In a further effort to save money Perry resorted to base closures and realignments. In May 1994 he and General John M. Shalikashvili, chairman of the Joint Chiefs of Staff, announced that Defense would go forward, as required by law, with a 1995 round of base closings. In doing so Defense would consider the economic impact on the affected communities and the capacity to manage the reuse of closed facilities, and in March 1995 Perry released DoD's 1995 base realignment and closure (BRAC) plan, recommending 146 actions. He estimated that implementing BRAC 95 would bring one-time costs of $3.8 billion and net savings of $4 billion within a six-year period.

=== Foreign relations ===
At the time of his appointment it was not expected that Perry would involve himself aggressively in foreign policy. He quickly belied this impression. Within days of taking office he left Washington on his first trip abroad to confer with European defense ministers. In April 1994 the Economist, in an article entitled "Perrypatetic," observed: "The man who has started to sound like a secretary of state is in fact the defense secretary, William Perry. ... He is popping up in public all over the place and moving into the strategy business in a big way." In fact, Perry traveled abroad in his three-year tenure more than any previous secretary. Unlike most of his predecessors, Perry paid attention to the other nations in the Americas, hosting the first Conference of Defense Ministers of the Americas at Williamsburg, Virginia, in 1995 and attending the second conference in 1996 in Argentina. His extensive travel matched his direct style. In his travels, he emphasized personal contact with rank and file members of the armed forces. His frequent trips also reflected the demands of the large number of foreign crises that occurred during his term, including several requiring the deployment of U.S. forces.

==== NATO ====
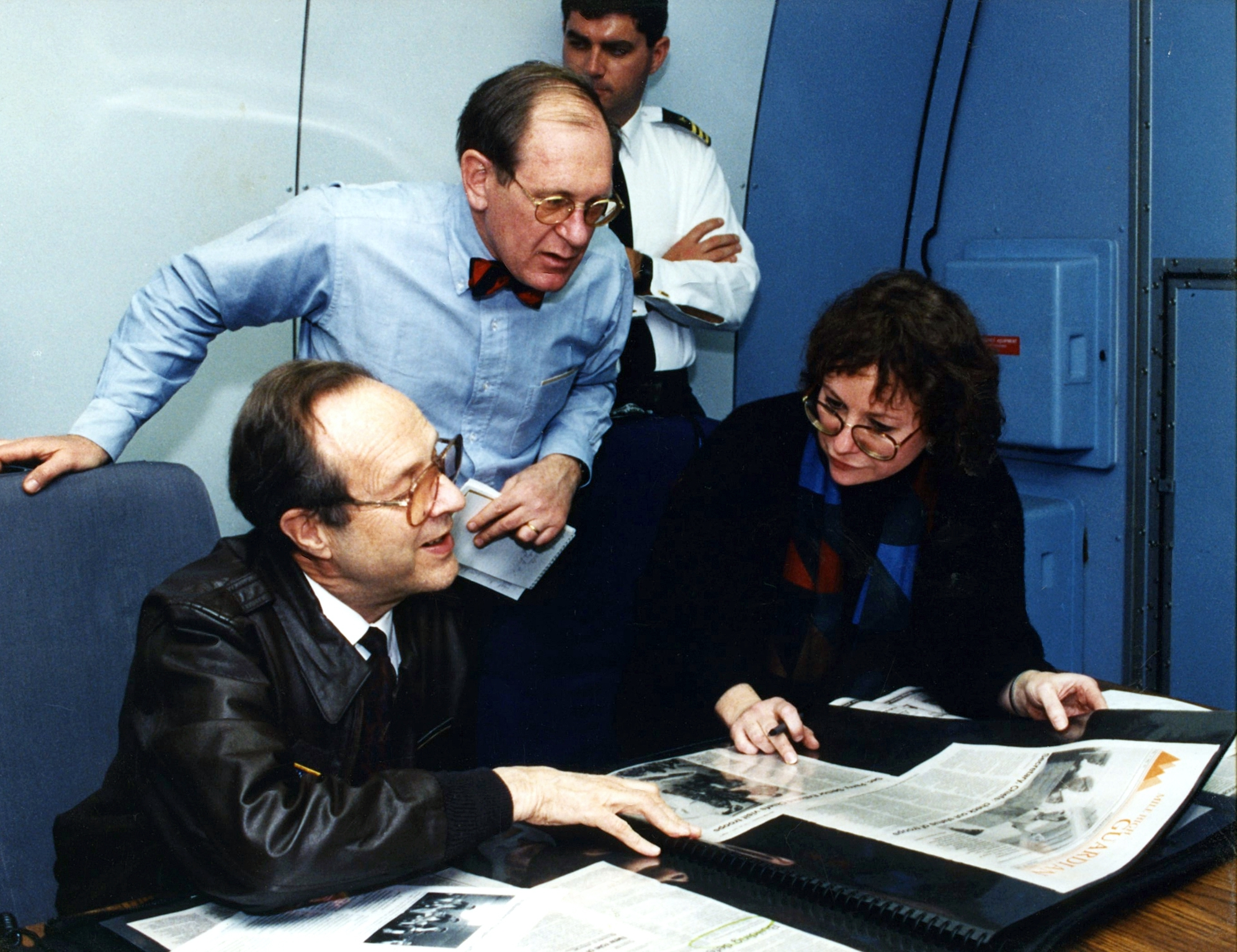
Perry and Assistant Secretary of Defense for Public Affairs Kenneth Bacon and Linda Kozaryn, American Forces Press Service reporter, during a flight to Europe, 1995

Perry strongly supported the North Atlantic Treaty Organization (NATO). He made major efforts to promote its Partnership for Peace Program, which the Clinton administration saw as a way to link NATO with the new Eastern European democracies, including Russia, and as a compromise between the wishes of many of the Eastern European countries to become full NATO members and Russia's determined opposition. Individual nations could join the Partnership for Peace under separate agreements with NATO, and many did so, enabling them to participate in NATO joint training and military exercises without becoming formal members of the alliance. Perry conferred several times with Russian Defense Minister Pavel Grachev in an effort to allay Russia's worries about and secure its membership in the Partnership for Peace. The issue remained outstanding when Perry left office in early 1997, by which time NATO had developed tentative plans to admit a few former Warsaw Pact members during the summer of 1997.

==== Russia ====
Although he recognized that the reform movement in Russia might not succeed, Perry did everything he could to improve relations with Moscow. He stressed the need for continuing military cooperation with and aid to the states of the former Soviet Union to facilitate destruction of their nuclear weapons. He used the Cooperative Threat Reduction Act of 1992 (the Nunn-Lugar program), which provided funds for the dismantling of nuclear weapons in Russia, Ukraine, Belarus, and Kazakhstan, to diminish the nuclear threat. He urged Congress to continue the threat reduction program, defending it against claims that in reality it provided foreign aid to the Russian Armed Forces. By June 1996 when Perry traveled to Ukraine to observe the completion of that country's transfer of nuclear warheads to Russia under the Budapest Memorandum on Security Assurances, the only former Soviet missiles still outside of Russia were in Belarus. Perry testified in favor of U.S. ratification of the START II treaty, completed in 1996; in October 1996 he spoke to a session of the Russian State Duma in Moscow, urging its members to ratify the treaty.

==== Asia ====
In Asia, like former defense secretary Caspar Weinberger a decade earlier, Perry endeavored to improve relations with both the People's Republic of China and Japan. He was the first secretary of defense to visit China after the Tiananmen Square protests of 1989, when PRC authorities forcibly crushed a dissident movement. While not ignoring long-standing problems such as the PRC's weapons sales abroad and its human rights abuses, he believed that the U.S. and the PRC should cooperate militarily. He made some progress, although when China threatened Taiwan just before the latter's presidential election in March 1996, the United States sent two aircraft carrier task forces to the area to counter the Chinese.

In 1995 a young girl was raped by three U.S. servicemen stationed in Okinawa, Japan. The crime led to demands that the United States diminish its military presence on the island. Late in 1996, the United States agreed to vacate 20% of the land it used on Okinawa and to close some military facilities, including Marine Corps Air Station Futenma. The Japanese agreed that the 28,000 United States Forces Japan troops stationed on Okinawa could remain.

==== Bosnian War ====
A serious ongoing international crisis was in Bosnia. When Perry took over in 1994, the Bosnian Serb Army of Republika Srpska were besieging Sarajevo, the Bosnian capital, but the Serbs were forced to draw back in face of a UN ultimatum and warning of airstrikes. Shortly thereafter the Serbs threatened to overrun the Bosnian Muslim city of Goražde in eastern Bosnia. Perry at first ruled out U.S. military action, but in April 1994 U.S. fighter planes participated in UN airstrikes at Goražde, causing the Bosnian Serbs to retreat.

In a major statement on Bosnia in June 1994, Perry attempted to clarify U.S. policy there, declaring that the conflict did involve U.S. national interests, humanitarian and otherwise, but not "supreme" interests. To limit the spread of violence in Bosnia, the United States had committed air power under NATO to stop the bombardment of Bosnian cities, provide air support for UN troops, and carry out humanitarian missions. Perry and the White House resisted congressional pressures to lift an arms embargo imposed earlier by the United Nations on all sides in the Bosnian War. During 1994–95 some senators, including Republican leader Bob Dole, wanted the embargo against the Republic of Bosnia and Herzegovina lifted to enable them to resist the Republika Srpska more effectively. Perry thought this might provoke Serb attacks and perhaps force the commitment of U.S. ground troops. In August 1995 Clinton vetoed legislation to lift the arms embargo. (In fact, the Bosnian Muslims had been receiving arms from outside sources.) Meanwhile, although it had stated consistently that it would not send U.S. ground forces to Bosnia, in December 1994 the Clinton administration expressed willingness to commit troops to help rescue UN peacekeepers in Bosnia if they were withdrawn. In May 1995, after the Bosnian Serbs had taken about 3,000 peacekeepers hostage, the United States, France, Germany, and Russia resolved to provide a larger and better-equipped UN force.

Applying strong pressure, in November 1995 the United States persuaded the presidents of Serbia and Montenegro, Bosnia, and Croatia to attend a conference in Dayton, Ohio, that after much contention produced a peace agreement, formally signed in Paris in mid-December. It provided for the cessation of hostilities, withdrawal of the combatants to specified lines, creation of a separation zone, and the stationing in Bosnia of a Peace Implementation Force (IFOR). The North Atlantic Council, with Perry participating, had decided in September 1995 to develop a NATO-led force to implement any peace agreement for Bosnia, setting the force size at 60,000 troops, including 20,000 from the United States. In congressional testimony in November, Perry explained why U.S. troops should go to Bosnia: The war threatened vital U.S. political, economic, and security interests in Europe; there was a real opportunity to stop the bloodshed; the United States was the only nation that could lead a NATO force to implement the peace, and the risks to the United States of allowing the war to continue were greater than the risks of the planned military operation.

The first U.S. troops moved into Bosnia in early December 1995, and by late January 1996, the full complement of 20,000 had been deployed. Although Perry had said earlier that they would leave Bosnia within a year, in June 1996 he hinted at a longer stay if NATO decided the peace in Bosnia would not hold without them. The secretary agreed to a study proposed in September 1996 by NATO defense ministers for a follow-on force to replace IFOR. Finally in November 1996, after the presidential election, Clinton announced, with Perry's support, that the United States would provide 8,500 troops to a NATO follow-on force. The U.S. force would be gradually reduced in 1997 and 1998 and completely withdrawn by June 1998.

==== Haitian Crisis ====
Perry also inherited from Aspin the problem of what to do about Haïti, where a military junta continued to refuse to reinstate the deposed president, Jean-Bertrand Aristide. In the spring of 1994, debate persisted in the United States Congress on whether to intervene militarily to oust Raoul Cédras, the military leader, and restore Aristide to power. President Clinton said that the United States would not rule out the use of military force and also suggested that military teams to train local security and police forces might be sent to Haïti. In the meantime, large numbers of refugees fled from Haïti in boats, hoping to gain admittance to the United States. U.S. vessels intercepted most of them at sea and took them to the Guantanamo Bay Naval Base in Cuba.

In spite of continuing pressure and obvious preparations in the United States for an invasion of Haïti, the junta refused to yield. On September 19, 1994, just after former President Jimmy Carter negotiated an agreement, the United States sent in military forces with UN approval. Haïti's de facto leaders, including Cédras, agreed to step down by October 15 so that Aristide could return to the presidency. By the end of September, 19,600 U.S. troops were in Haïti as part of Operation Uphold Democracy. At the end of March 1995, a UN commander took over, and the United States provided 2,400 of the 6,000-man UN force that would remain in Haïti until February 1996. Given the opposition to the mission when it began, the primary U.S. concern was to do its limited job and avoid casualties among its forces. With the final withdrawal of U.S. troops, and Aristide's duly elected successor installed in office in February 1996, the Pentagon and the Clinton administration could label the Haitian operation a success up to that point.

==== North Korea ====
North Korea posed another serious problem for Perry, who backed the administration's policy of pressuring Kim Il Sung's Communist regime to allow monitoring of its nuclear facilities by the International Atomic Energy Agency (IAEA). Between February and October 1994 the United States increased its pressures on North Korea. Perry warned in March that the United States would not permit the development of an arsenal of nuclear weapons. War was not imminent, he said, but he indicated that he had ordered military preparations for a possible conflict. Soon thereafter Perry stated that the United States would propose UN economic sanctions if North Korea did not allow international inspection of its planned withdrawal of spent fuel from a nuclear reactor fuel containing sufficient plutonium to produce four or five nuclear weapons. North Korea began removing the nuclear fuel from the Yongbyon nuclear facility in May 1994 without granting the IAEA inspection privileges, and later said it withdraw from the IAEA and the Nuclear Non-Proliferation Treaty. Perry offered three options to Clinton: sanctions against North Korea through the United Nations, a limited F-117 air strike on the Yongbyon facility, or a massive military buildup in preparation for full-scale war with North Korea. Under the belief that all three options would lead to war, Clinton leaned towards the military buildup option before negotiations between former US President Jimmy Carter and Kim mediated the situation.

On October 21, 1994, the United States and North Korea signed the Agreed Framework after lengthy negotiations in Geneva, Switzerland, assisted again by former President Carter. The United States, Japan, South Korea, and other regional allies promised to provide North Korea with two light water nuclear reactors, at an eventual cost of $4 billion, to replace existing or partially constructed facilities that could produce plutonium for nuclear weapons. North Korea then agreed to open its nuclear facilities to international inspection, and the United States pledged to lift trade restrictions and provide heavy fuel oil for electric power generation. Perry considered this agreement better than risking a war in Korea and a continuation of North Korea's nuclear program. He promised that he would ask Congress for money to build up U.S. forces in South Korea if the agreement broke down. Again a critical situation had moderated, but implementing the agreement proved difficult. By the end of Perry's term, some issues remained outstanding, and tension between the two Koreas flared up from time to time. After his tenure, Clinton appointed Perry as North Korean policy coordinator in 1998, where he recommended continued diplomatic engagement with Kim Jong Il's government.

==== The Middle East ====
In the Persian Gulf area, Ba'athist Iraq continued to have conflict, with periodic provocative moves by Saddam Hussein triggering U.S. military action. After the 1991 Gulf War, acting in accord with United Nations Security Council Resolution 688, the United States organized a coalition to enforce no-fly zones in Iraq, north of 36° and south of 32°. In a tragic accident in April 1994 two U.S. Air Force F-15 aircraft, operating in the no-fly zone north of the 36th parallel in Iraq, shot down two U.S. Army UH-60 Black Hawk helicopters after misidentifying them as Iraqi. This incident, with its high death toll, highlighted dramatically the complexities in dealing with Iraq in the aftermath of the 1991 Gulf War. Further, in October 1994, when several elite Iraqi Armed Forces divisions began to move toward the Iraq–Kuwait border, the United States mobilized ground, air, and naval forces in the area to counter the threat. Perry warned Iraq that the U.S. forces would take action if it did not move its Republican Guard units north of the 32nd parallel. Subsequently, the UN Security Council passed a resolution requiring Iraq to pull its troops back at least 150 miles from Kuwait's border.

Iran, too, behaved aggressively, placing at least 6,000 troops in March 1995 on three islands at the mouth of the Persian Gulf claimed by both Iran and the United Arab Emirates. Perry stated that the Iranian moves threatened shipping in the Strait of Hormuz, a waterway on which moved a significant part of the world's oil production. The United States worked with its allies in the Persian Gulf area to bolster their capacity to defend themselves and to use their collective strength through the Gulf Cooperation Council. Most important, in Perry's judgment, was the determination of the United States to maintain a strong regional defense capability with aircraft and naval ships in the area, prepositioned equipment, standing operational plans, and access agreements with the Persian Gulf partners.

Provocative moves again by Iraq forced the United States to take strong action. When Saddam Hussein intervened in September 1996 by sending some 40,000 troops to assist one side in a dispute between two Kurdish factions in northern Iraq, he demonstrated that he was not deterred by a U.S. warning against using military force. Perry made clear that while no significant U.S. interests were involved in the factional conflict, maintaining stability in the region as a whole was vital to U.S. security and there would be a U.S. reaction. On both September 2 and 3, U.S. aircraft attacked Iraqi fixed surface-to-air missile (SAM) sites and air defense control facilities in the south, because, Perry explained, the United States saw the principal threat from Iraq to be against Kuwait.

Another tragic incident on June 25, 1996, revealed the continuing tension in the Middle East and the dangers involved in the U.S. military presence. Terrorists exploded a truck bomb at the Khobar Towers apartment complex housing U.S. Air Force personnel in Dhahran, Saudi Arabia, killing 19 and wounding 500. In September 1996 an investigative panel set up by Perry recommended vigorous measures to deter, prevent, or mitigate the effects of future terrorist acts against U.S. personnel overseas, and further, that a solitary DoD element have responsibility for force protection. The panel found that the unit attacked at Dhahran had not taken every precaution it might have to protect the forces at Khobar Towers. Eventually, the Defense Department moved units from Dhahran to more remote areas in Saudi Arabia to provide better protection.

==== Somalia ====
U.S. involvement in Somalia, a problem during Aspin's tenure, ended in 1994. Under the protection of U.S. Marines on ships offshore, the last U.S. forces left Somalia before the end of March, meeting a deadline set earlier by President Clinton. Later, in February 1995, more than 7,000 U.S. troops assisted in removing the remaining UN peacekeepers and weapons from Somalia in a markedly successful operation.

==== Rwanda ====
In another mission in Africa in 1994, the United States became involved in humanitarian efforts in Rwanda. A civil war between two rival ethnic groups, the Hutu and Tutsi, resulted in widespread death and destruction and the flight of hundreds of thousands of refugees from Rwanda into neighboring countries, including Zaire. Although not part of the UN peacekeeping operation in Rwanda, the United States provided humanitarian aid in the form of purified water, medicine, site sanitation, and other means. In July the Pentagon sent in aircraft and about 3,000 troops, most of them to Zaire. The U.S. forces also took control of and rebuilt the airport at Kigali, Rwanda's capital, to aid in the distribution of food, medicine, and other supplies. The lack of a U.S. response to the Rwandan genocide was later considered a major foreign policy failure of the Bill Clinton administration by President Clinton and was due to fear of repeating the Battle of Mogadishu.

=== Accomplishments and resignation ===
In January 1996, Perry talked about experiences over the past year in which he never thought a Secretary of Defense would be involved. At the top of the list was witnessing participation of a Russian Ground Forces brigade in a U.S. Army division in the Bosnian peacekeeping operation. The others—Dayton, Ohio, becoming synonymous with peace in the Balkans; helping the Russian defense minister blow up a Minuteman missile silo in Missouri; watching United States and Russian troops training together in Kansas; welcoming former Warsaw Pact troops in Louisiana; operating a school at Garmisch, Germany, to teach former Soviet and East European military officers about democracy, budgeting, and testifying to a parliament; dismantling the military specifications system for acquisition; cutting the ear off a pig in Kazakhstan, and eating rendered Manchurian toad fat in China. These things, Perry said, demonstrate "just how much the world has changed, just how much our security has changed, just how much the Department of Defense has changed, and just how much my job has changed."

Shortly after President Clinton's reelection in November 1996, Perry made known his decision to step down as secretary. He spoke of his growing frustration over working with a Congress so partisan that it was harming the military establishment, and said that he did not think the results of the 1996 congressional election would decrease the partisanship. He later explained that his decision to retire was "largely due to the constant strain of sending U.S. military personnel on life-threatening missions."

As he left the Pentagon, Perry listed what he thought were his most important accomplishments: establishing effective working relationships with U.S. military leaders; improving the lot of the military, especially enlisted men and women; managing the military drawdown; instituting important acquisition reforms; developing close relationships with many foreign defense ministers; effectively employing military strength and resources in Bosnia, Haiti, Korea, and the Persian Gulf area; dramatically reducing the nuclear legacy of the Cold War; and promoting the Partnership for Peace within NATO. His disappointments included failure to obtain Russian ratification of the START II treaty; slowness in securing increases in the budget for weapon systems modernization; and the faulty perceptions of the Gulf War illness syndrome held by some of the media and much of the public. At a ceremony for Perry in January 1997 General Shalikashvili noted the departing secretary's relationship with the troops. "Surely," Shalikashvili said, "Bill Perry has been the GI's secretary of defense. When asked his greatest accomplishment as secretary, Bill Perry didn't name an operation or a weapons system. He said that his greatest accomplishment was his very strong bond with our men and women in uniform."

Perry's career in the Department of Defense actually spanned eight years of profound changes—four years as Undersecretary for Research and Engineering in 1977 to 1981, a year as Deputy Secretary from 1993 to 1994, and three years as Secretary.

== Later career ==
=== Academia and corporate boards ===
After he left the Pentagon, Perry returned to San Francisco to join the board of Hambrecht and Quist as a senior adviser.

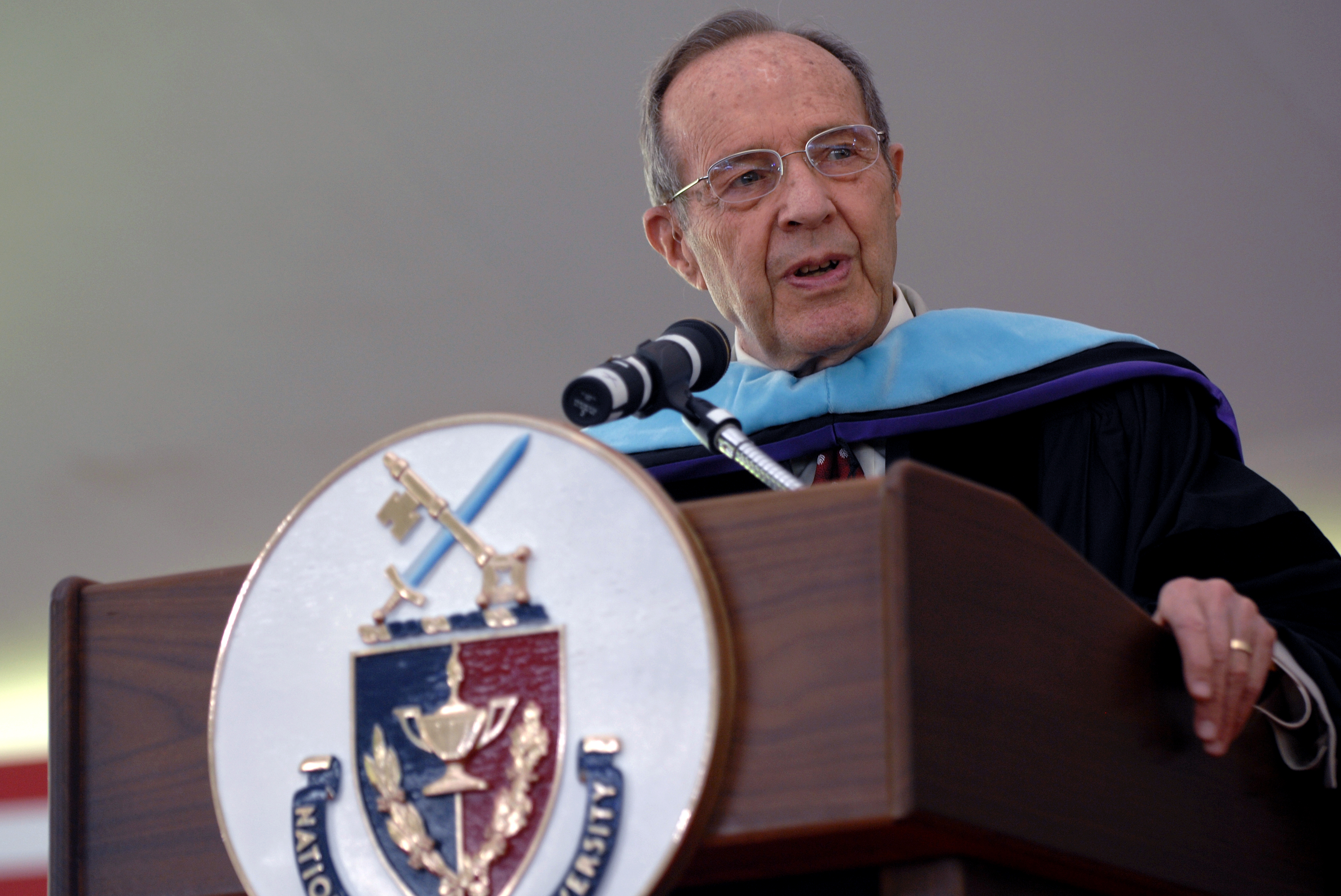
Perry at the National Defense University graduation on Fort Lesley J. McNair, Washington, D.C., on June 12, 2008.

Perry rejoined the faculty at Stanford University, becoming a professor at the Freeman Spogli Institute for International Studies, co-director of the Preventive Defense Project at the Stanford University Center for International Security and Cooperation, and the Michael and Barbara Berberian Professor (emeritus) at Stanford's School of Engineering.

In 1999, Perry was awarded the James A. Van Fleet Award by The Korea Society.

Perry sits on the advisory board of the Commonwealth Club of California. Perry currently sits on the board of directors for Xyleco. Perry joined the financial board of the Thailand-based manufacturing company, Fabrinet in 2008. He was a board member of Theranos, a Silicon Valley biotech company which defrauded more than $700 million from its investors before it collapsed.

On June 17, 2006, Perry gave the featured commencement speech to engineering and science graduates at the University of California, Santa Barbara.

William Perry appeared as an important and influential person in the development of Silicon Valley, in the PBS documentary, Silicon Valley: 100 Year Renaissance (1998).

On October 16, 2008, Perry was awarded the Sylvanus Thayer Award by the United States Military Academy.

=== Work to eliminate nuclear weapons ===
Perry is a founding board member of the Nuclear Threat Initiative, a nonprofit, nonpartisan organization working to reduce the threat of nuclear, chemical, and biological weapons. He currently has an emeritus status on the board. Perry is an advisory board member for the Partnership for a Secure America, a not-for-profit organization dedicated to recreating the bipartisan center in American national security and foreign policy. Perry is currently chair of the Board of Sponsors for the Bulletin of the Atomic Scientists and frequently speaks at Bulletin events. He is a Member of the Supervisory Council of the International Luxembourg Forum on Preventing Nuclear Catastrophe. Perry is also a member of the board of directors of the Center for a New American Security, a Washington, DC–based think tank that specializes in U.S. national security issues. Perry is also on the advisory board of the Truman National Security Project, a progressive leadership institute that trains the next generation of foreign policy and national security leaders.

In March 2006, he was appointed to the Iraq Study Group, a group formed to give advice on the U.S. government's Iraq policy.

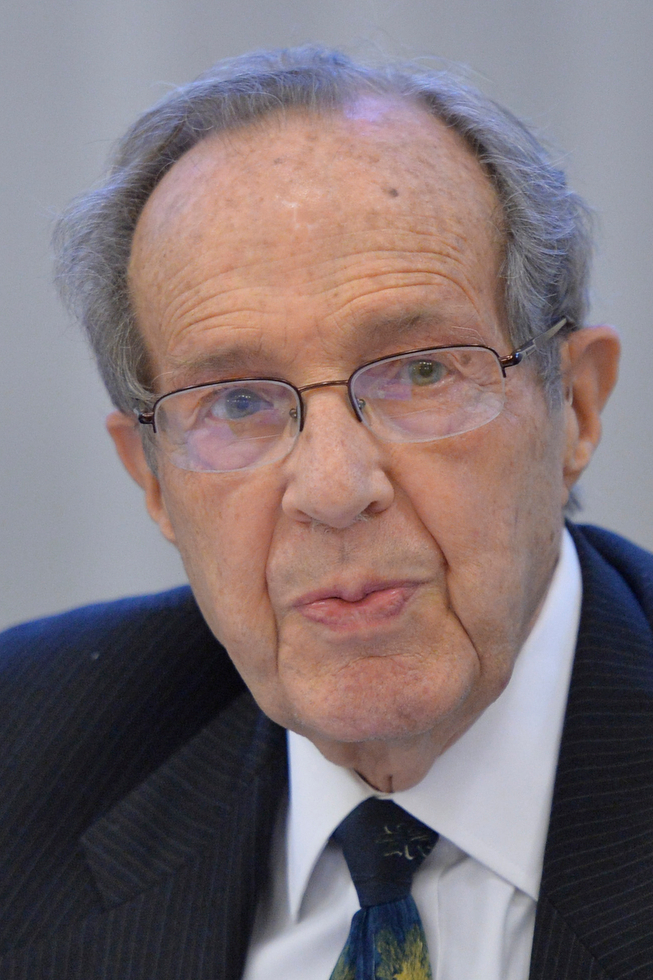
Perry at a conference in Stockholm in 2014

In 2007, Secretary Perry joined three other eminent statesmen, former Secretaries of State George P. Shultz and Henry Kissinger, and former Senator Sam Nunn in calling for the United States to take the lead in reducing and eliminating nuclear weapons. Their op-ed, "A World Free of Nuclear Weapons", published in the Wall Street Journal, reverberated throughout the world, and is one of the key factors that has convinced political leaders and experts internationally that the conditions are in place to achieve that goal. The four men published four subsequent op-eds in the Wall Street Journal, including one on March 5, 2013: "Next Steps in Reducing Nuclear Risks: The Pace of Non-Proliferation Work Today Doesn't Match the Urgency of the Threat". They subsequently created the Nuclear Security Project to galvanize global action to reduce urgent nuclear dangers and build support for their vision and the steps to achieve them. The Nuclear Threat Initiative serves as coordinator of the NSP, in conjunction with Stanford University's Hoover Institution. In 2010, the four produced the documentary Nuclear Tipping Point. The film is introduced by General Colin Powell, narrated by Michael Douglas and includes interviews with California Governor Arnold Schwarzenegger and former Soviet President Mikhail Gorbachev.

In 2011, Perry joined a team of former government officials from various countries, formed under the auspices of the Governor of Hiroshima Prefecture Hidehiko Yuzaki to prepare a plan for the total abolition of nuclear weapons. This project is titled Hiroshima for Global Peace.

In 2013, Perry founded the William J. Perry Project to seek to promote greater public awareness about nuclear weapons and engage more people in acting to mitigate the growing threat they pose to humanity. The Project is a nonprofit venture supported with funds raised from private individuals and is sponsored by the Nuclear Threat Initiative.

In 2015, Perry published a memoir, My Journey at the Nuclear Brink, (Stanford Univ. Press), with a foreword by George P. Shultz. The memoir describes coming of age at the dawn of the nuclear age, and his later roles in managing the nuclear threat. He warned that: "Today, the danger of some sort of a nuclear catastrophe is greater than it was during the Cold War and most people are blissfully unaware of this danger.”

On September 30, 2016, the New York Times published a Perry opinion editorial advocating, " ... the United States can safely phase out its land-based intercontinental ballistic missile (ICBM) force ... ". Perry believes that ICBM's are turning more into liabilities than assets. Perry says it would save "considerable cost" and would prevent accidental nuclear war. With regards to an accidental nuclear war, Perry has experienced a false alarm for an incoming missile which later turned out to be a computer error. Perry's experience was 40 years ago but our technology is still not perfect with the recent false alarm in 2018 Hawaii false missile alert. Perry says the major problem with ICBM's are the "non-recall" ability which if these missiles are sent and it turns out to be a false alarm then there's no turning back.

Perry is cited by the website of Los Angeles Congressman Ted Lieu for supporting legislation proposed by Lieu and U.S. Senator Ed Markey, Democrat from Massachusetts, that would limit President Donald Trump and future presidents' authority to launch a nuclear first strike against another country by requiring them to first get approval from Congress. The following quotation is attributed to Perry in Congressman Lieu's website: "During my period as Secretary of Defense, I never confronted a situation, or could even imagine a situation, in which I would recommend that the President make a first strike with nuclear weapons—understanding that such an action, whatever the provocation, would likely bring about the end of civilization. I believe that the legislation proposed by Congressman Lieu and Senator Markey recognizes that terrible reality. Certainly, a decision that momentous for all of civilization should have the kind of checks and balances on Executive powers called for by our Constitution."

Perry was profiled in the Radiolab episode Nukes in 2017. He argued for the need for checks and balances for a nuclear strike by the U.S.

=== Center for Hemispheric Defense Studies (CHDS) ===
On April 2, 2013, the Center for Hemispheric Defense Studies (CHDS) was officially renamed the William J. Perry Center for Hemispheric Defense Studies (The Perry Center) in recognition of its founder, the 19th U.S. Secretary of Defense, Dr. William J. Perry. This change honored his role in establishing the center, which originated from the first Defense Ministerial of the Americas in 1995, when Perry promoted regional defense cooperation and the training of civilians in security matters.

=== Books ===
With Tom Collina of the Ploughshares Fund, Perry wrote the book The Button: The New Nuclear Arms Race and Presidential Power from Truman to Trump. This book concludes with a ten-point plan for nuclear weapons safety:

1. End presidential sole nuclear authority.
2. Prohibit launch on warning.
3. Prohibit first use.
4. Retire all ICBMs and scale back the nuclear rebuild.
5. Save New START and go farther.
6. Limit strategic missile defenses.
7. Don't wait for treaties.
8. Engage diplomatically with North Korea and Iran.
9. Bring the bomb into the new mass movement.
10. Elect a committed president.

=== Other political activities ===
Perry, along with all other living former secretaries of defense, ten in total, published a Washington Post op-ed piece in January 2021 telling President Donald Trump not to involve the military in determining the outcome of the 2020 elections.

== Honors ==
- United States: Presidential Medal of Freedom, with Distinction, 1997.
- Poland: Order of Merit of the Republic of Poland, 1996 Postanowienie Prezydenta Rzeczypospolitej Polskiej z dnia 13 grudnia 1996 r. o nadaniu orderu..
- Croatia: Grand Order of King Dmitar Zvonimir 1998.
- United Kingdom: Knight Commander of the Order of the British Empire, 1998.
- Japan: Grand Cordon, Order of the Rising Sun, 2002.
- France: Ordre National du Merite.

== See also ==
- Timeline of United States and China relations 1995–1997

== Sources ==
- This article incorporates public domain material from William J. Perry. Office of the Secretary of Defense.
- William J. Perry at the Mathematics Genealogy Project

Government offices
Preceded by Malcolm R. Currie	Under Secretary of Defense for Research and Engineering; 1977–1981	Succeeded by Richard DeLauer
Political offices
Preceded by Donald J. Atwood Jr.	United States Deputy Secretary of Defense; 1993–1994	Succeeded by John M. Deutch
Preceded by Les Aspin	United States Secretary of Defense; 1994–1997	Succeeded by William Cohen
U.S. order of precedence (ceremonial)
Preceded by Hazel R. O'Leary as Former U.S. Cabinet Member	Order of precedence of the United States as Former U.S. Cabinet Member	Succeeded by Robert Rubin as Former U.S. Cabinet Member
