= Jane Weinberger =

American writer

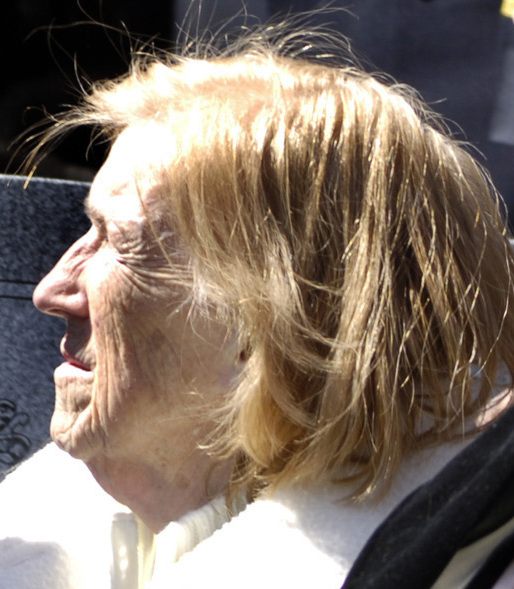
- Born: Rebecca Jane Dalton; March 29, 1918; Milford, Maine, U.S.
- Died: July 12, 2009 (aged 91); Bar Harbor, Maine, U.S.
- Occupations: Author and publisher
- Spouse: Caspar Weinberger (m. 1942; died 2006)
- Children: 2

Rebecca Jane Weinberger (née Dalton; March 29, 1918 – July 12, 2009) was an American author, publisher and wife of Caspar Weinberger, the 15th United States Secretary of Defense. She wrote over a dozen books during her career, many written for children and young adults.

== Early life ==
Born as Rebecca Jane Dalton on March 29, 1918, in Milford, Maine, she attended the University of Maine and the Somerville Hospital School of Nursing in Somerville, Massachusetts.

Dalton, who became a nursing instructor following her completion of school, signed with the U.S. government to help in times of national emergency. She was called to duty at the beginning of World War II and became an Army nurse. She met her future husband, U.S. Army second lieutenant Caspar Weinberger, while the two were on the same troop transport ship to Australia during the summer of 1942. She outranked Weinberger by a few weeks at the time.

== Marriage ==
The couple married three weeks later, once the ship had disembarked in Australia. The wedding took place in Sydney, in 1942. They did not live together until the end of World War II. They moved to San Francisco, Caspar Weinberger's hometown, after the war.

== Career ==
Caspar Weinberger initially worked for a San Francisco law firm. His wife persuaded him to run for political office and worked as his first campaign manager. He was elected to the California State Assembly in 1952, where he represented a San Francisco area constituency for the next six years. She remained actively engaged in his political campaigns.

Weinberger's career continued to rise during the Nixon and Reagan administrations. Jane Weinberger moved to Washington D.C. at the start of the Nixon presidency, when her husband was appointed as head of the Federal Trade Commission. He later became the director of the Office of Management and Budget under Nixon, and as Secretary of Health, Education, and Welfare under both Nixon and President Gerald Ford. Caspar Weinberger later became the Secretary of Defense under Ronald Reagan for most of his two terms in office. He resigned as Defense Secretary in 1987 when Jane was diagnosed with several serious medical conditions, including cancer, which she survived.

== Author ==
Jane Weinberger first began writing and publishing during Reagan's first term, while her husband, Caspar Weinberger, was Defense Secretary. Her career in publishing began as the result of one of the Reagan administration's budget cuts. President Reagan had eliminated funding for the Future Scientists Fund, which would team students with scientists at the Jackson Laboratory in Bar Harbor, Maine, for the summer. Jane had been a key supporter of the program.

Weinberger authored a children's book, Vim, about a lab mouse, in order to raise money for the Future Scientists Fund. She donated all proceeds from the sales of Vim to the FSF. She collaborated with her husband on another children's book, Kiltie, about the Weinbergers' family dog, Kiltie. Jane wrote the story, while Caspar took the photographs which appear in the book. Caspar also helped to pack, sell and deliver some of his wife's books during the Reagan years. Jane Weinberger acknowledged her husband's contributions in the author's notes for a 1986 book about charitable fundraising, Please Buy My Violets.

Weinberger founded the publishing company Windswept House Publishers in 1984. The publishing house was named for the Weinberger family home located in Somesville, Maine on Mount Desert Island. Weinberger ran the company from her home. Windswept House initially published children's books written by Weinberger, but she expanded its catalogue to include children's publications written by other authors, as well as books for adults. The company has published over 120 books, many aimed at young people, since its creation.

In 1991, Weinberger released As Ever: A Selection of Letters from the Voluminous Correspondence of Jane Weinberger, 1970-1990, a compilation of letters which she had written to her friends and family. The letters offered an insight into Weinberger's views of top political figures. She called Nancy Reagan "irritable and snappish", referred to former Soviet ambassador to the U.S. Anatoly Dobrynin as "a wily old bastard but amusing" and stated that former vice president Spiro Agnew "makes me sick".

Weinberger was also involved in a number of other charitable causes. She served as the chairwoman of the Folger Shakespeare Library in Washington D.C. from 1981 to 1986. Weinberger held seats on the boards of directors of both Amherst College and the Jackson Laboratory in Bar Harbor.

Weinberger and her husband co-founded a scholarship for students at Mount Desert Island High School pursuing careers in vocational programs. She authored her last book, Experience the Journey, in 2003. Her husband Caspar Weinberger died in 2006, aged 88.

== Personal life ==
Jane Weinberger had been in poor health before suffering a stroke in early July 2009. She died at a nursing care facility in Bar Harbor, on July 12, 2009, aged 91. Her ashes were scattered in the gardens of her home in Somesville, Maine. She was survived by her two children, daughter Arlin Weinberger, and son, Caspar Weinberger, Jr.; three grandchildren, five great-grandchildren, and a sister.

"From what I know of her early history, my mother found herself born into a quasi-indigent and somewhat dysfunctional family--her father simply left home one day when she was about eight years old and never came back...She was sworn in as a Second Lieutenant U.S. Army nurse in 1941 and soon was transferred to the Pacific theater." - Caspar W. Weinberger, Jr.

She was survived by her sister, Mary Virginia (née Dalton) Garceau.
