= John B. Bellinger III =

American lawyer (born 1960)

John Bellinger
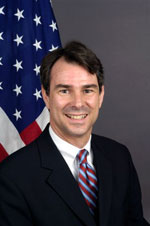

21st Legal Adviser of the Department of State
- In office April 8, 2005 – January 20, 2009
- President: George W. Bush
- Preceded by: William Howard Taft IV
- Succeeded by: Harold Hongju Koh

Personal details
- Born: March 28, 1960 (age 66) Neuilly-sur-Seine, France
- Party: Republican
- Education: Princeton University (AB); Harvard University (JD); University of Virginia (MA)

John Bellinger Bellinger III (born March 28, 1960) is an American lawyer who served as the Legal Adviser for the U.S. Department of State and the National Security Council during the George W. Bush administration. He is now a partner at the Washington, D.C. law firm Arnold & Porter, and Adjunct Senior Fellow at the Council on Foreign Relations.

== Education and earlier career ==
Born to an American military family in France, Bellinger was educated at St. Albans School in Washington, D.C. Thereafter, he received his A.B. cum laude in 1982 from Princeton University's School of Public and International Affairs and his J.D. cum laude in 1986 from Harvard Law School. He also received an M.A. in Foreign Affairs in 1991 from the University of Virginia, where he was awarded a Woodrow Wilson Foreign Affairs Fellowship.

Bellinger served as counsel for national security matters in the Criminal Division of the Department of Justice from 1997 to 2001. He served previously as counsel to the Senate Select Committee on Intelligence (1996), as general counsel to the Commission on the Roles and Capabilities of the United States Intelligence Community (1995–1996), and as special assistant to Director of Central Intelligence William Webster (1988–1991). From 1991 to 1995, he practiced law with Wilmer Cutler & Pickering in Washington, D.C.

== Bush administration ==
=== National Security Council ===
In February 2001, Bellinger was appointed as senior associate counsel to the president and legal adviser to the National Security Council at the White House, where he served as the principal lawyer for National Security Adviser Condoleezza Rice and the NSC staff. He was in the White House Situation Room on 9/11 and later was the primary lawyer for the White House in dealing with the 9/11 Commission. He was one of the drafters of the legislation that created the Office of the Director of National Intelligence.

At the White House, Bellinger was considered a moderate and often clashed with more conservative lawyers in the administration over international law and the administration's detention policies, especially over the treatment of detainees. After 9/11, Bellinger, and Rice were excluded by other officials in the administration from the preparation of President Bush's order establishing military commissions.

=== U.S. State Department ===
Bellinger managed the Senate confirmation process for Condoleezza Rice as Secretary of State and co-directed her State Department transition team. He was nominated by the President and confirmed by the Senate as the Legal Adviser of the State Department in April 2005. He continued to serve as a member of Rice's "inner circle".

As Legal Adviser, Bellinger was the principal adviser on all domestic and international law matters to the Department of State, the Foreign Service, and the diplomatic and consular posts abroad. He was also the principal adviser on legal matters relating to the conduct of foreign relations to other agencies and, through the Secretary of State, to the President and the National Security Council.

Bellinger was part of a group of Bush administration officials who advocated for minimum standards of treatment for detainees, protections for detainees prosecuted by military commissions, and the closure of the detention center at Guantanamo Bay. He helped persuade the White House to support the Detainee Treatment Act of 2005 (the McCain Amendment) and to close the secret CIA black sites in 2006. After the Supreme Court held in Hamdan v. Rumsfeld that Common Article 3 of the Geneva Conventions applied to the U.S. conflict with Al-Qaeda, Bellinger wrote a memo to the Department of Justice stating that the CIA interrogation program was not consistent with the Geneva Conventions. At the same time, Bellinger was also called upon to defend the Bush administration's counterterrorism policies to skeptical international audiences, serving as the administration's "chief flak catcher abroad". He gave numerous speeches and interviews explaining the U.S. legal approach to terrorism. Rice called Bellinger "indefatigable" in trying to address the concerns of U.S. allies.

In 2006, Bellinger headed the U.S. delegation that negotiated the Third Additional Protocol to the Geneva Conventions that allowed the humanitarian aid societies of Israel and the Palestinian territories to join the International Red Cross/Red Crescent Federation.

Bellinger has been credited with leading the Bush administration's shift in approach towards the International Criminal Court (ICC) in the administration's second term after President Bush agreed to the UN referral of the genocide in Darfur to the ICC in March 2005. In a series of speeches, Bellinger said the United States was prepared to assist the Court's investigation in Sudan even if it did not intend to join the Rome Statute. He has urged Congress to amend the American Servicemembers Protection Act to allow the United States to provide more support to the Court in certain war crimes investigations.

In 2008, Bellinger represented the United States before the International Court of Justice (ICJ) in a case filed by Mexico after the Supreme Court in Medellin v Texas invalidated President Bush's February 2005 order directing courts in Texas and other states to comply with the ICJ's 2004 order in Case Concerning Avena and Other Mexican Nationals that the United States review the convictions and death sentences of a group of Mexican nationals who had not been notified of their right to consular access under the Vienna Convention on Consular Relations. He later testified before Congress in support of legislation that would allow federal courts to review the death sentences of foreign nationals who had not been notified of their rights to consular access.

During his term as Legal Adviser Bellinger initiated a bi-annual dialogue on international law between the State Department Legal Adviser and his/her EU foreign ministry counterparts which continued after his tenure.

Bellinger's term as Legal Adviser ended on January 20, 2009. The then-Principal Deputy Legal Adviser, Joan Donoghue, served in an acting capacity until the Obama administration's nominee, Harold Koh, was confirmed as Legal Adviser by the U.S. Senate in March 2009. The same year, he received the Secretary of State's Distinguished Service Award.

== Post-government service ==
In 2009, after leaving the State Department, Bellinger joined the Washington, DC law firm of Arnold & Porter where he is a partner in the firm's public international law and national security law practices.

He is also an Adjunct Senior Fellow in International and National Security Law at the Council on Foreign Relations, where he directed a program on international justice. He speaks and writes regularly on international law issues. He is a senior contributor to Lawfare, a national security law blog.

In 2010, Bellinger publicly defended Obama administration officials who had been criticized for previously representing detainees at Guantanamo Bay.

Bellinger was critical of the Obama administration's heavy reliance on drone strikes to kill terrorists. In testimony before Congress in 2012, he urged the Obama administration to do more to explain the legality of targeted killings and to make its drone program more transparent.

In 2013, Bellinger was a signatory to an amicus curiae brief submitted to the Supreme Court by a group of former Republican officials in support of same-sex marriage in Hollingsworth v. Perry.

In 2016 Bellinger drafted the "50 G.O.P. Officials Warn Donald Trump Would Put Nation's Security 'at Risk'" letter.

In November 2018, Bellinger joined a group formed by George Conway, "Checks and Balances," composed of more than a dozen members of the conservative-libertarian Federalist Society, which had been instrumental in selecting candidates for the Trump administration to appoint to federal courts. The New York Times reported the group is "urging their fellow conservatives to speak up about what they say are the Trump administration’s betrayals of bedrock legal norms," with Bellinger stating "Conservative lawyers are not doing enough to protect constitutional principles that are being undermined by the statements and actions of this president."

In August 2020, Bellinger was one of 70 former senior security officials who took out a full-page ad in the Wall Street Journal, saying they would vote for Joe Biden as president.

In 2020, Bellinger, along with over 130 other former Republican national security officials, signed a statement that asserted that President Trump was unfit to serve another term, and "To that end, we are firmly convinced that it is in the best interest of our nation that Vice President Joe Biden be elected as the next President of the United States, and we will vote for him."

Bellinger is a member of the Council on Foreign Relations, the American Law Institute, the American Council on Germany, and the British-American Project. He is also member of the Secretary State's Advisory Committee on International Law. In 2012, he was appointed to the Defense Legal Policy Board. In October 2012, the American Law Institute named him as a Counselor for the Restatement Fourth of the Foreign Relations Law of the United States.

Bellinger is a former Vice Chairman of the Board of Governors of his alma mater, St. Albans School. He is a Trustee of the Protestant Episcopal Cathedral Foundation and sits on the America Abroad Media advisory board.

== Personal life ==
Bellinger was born into the fourth generation of a United States Army family. His great-grandfather was an 1884 West Point graduate who retired from military service as a brigadier general. His grandfather and father were also West Point graduates who both retired as colonels.

Political offices
Preceded by William Howard Taft IV	Legal Adviser of the Department of State; 2005–2009	Succeeded by Joan Donoghue; Acting
