= Donald J. Atwood Jr. =

American automobile executive and engineer

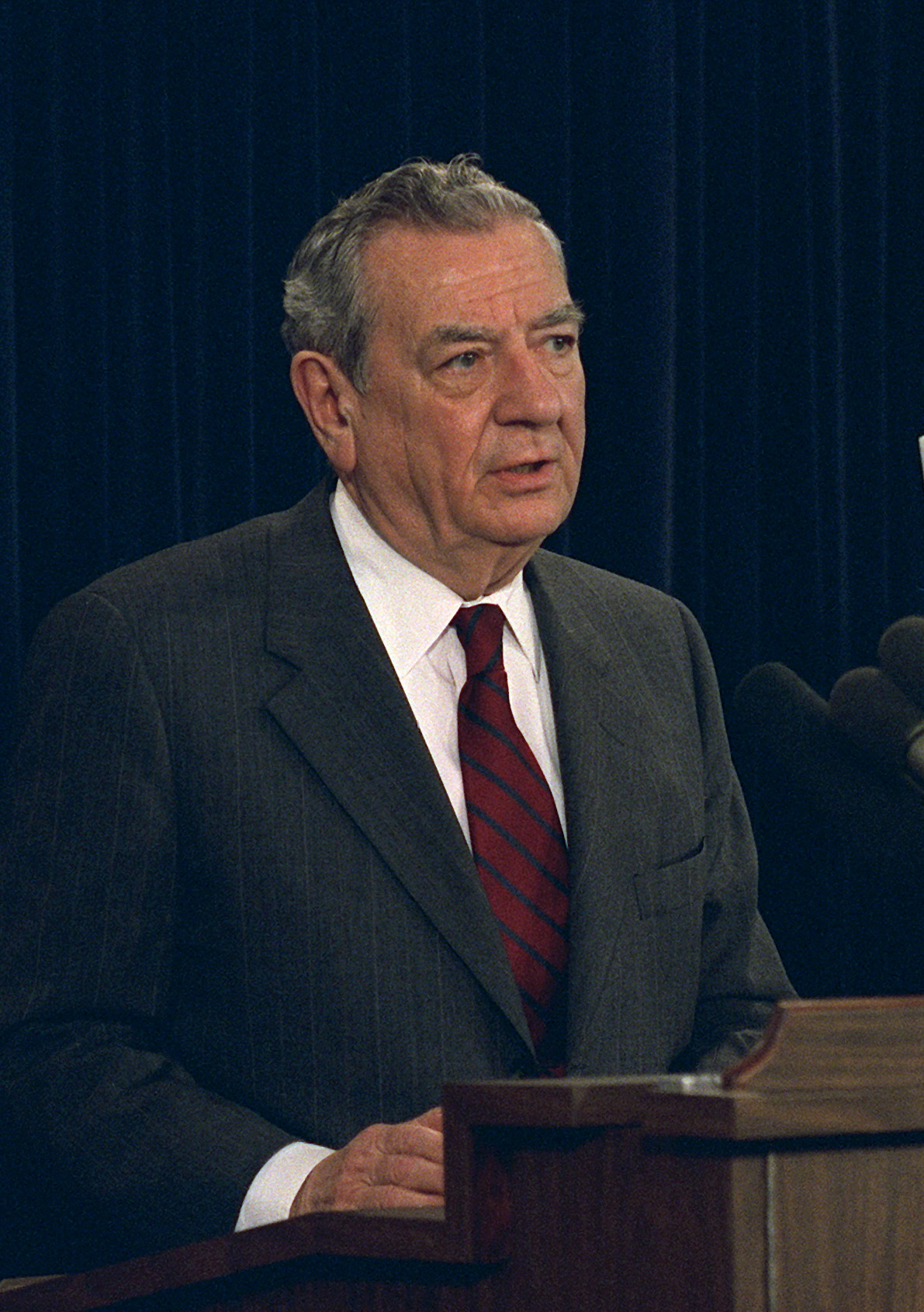
- Atwood in 1992

22nd United States Deputy Secretary of Defense
- In office April 24, 1989 – January 20, 1993
- President: George H. W. Bush
- Preceded by: William Howard Taft IV
- Succeeded by: William J. Perry

Personal details
- Born: Donald Jesse Atwood Jr. May 25, 1924 Haverhill, Massachusetts, U.S.
- Died: April 24, 1994 (aged 69) Royal Oak, Michigan, U.S.
- Occupation: Automobile executive
- Known for: Vice chairman of General Motors

Donald Jesse Atwood Jr. (May 25, 1924 – April 24, 1994) was appointed Deputy Secretary of Defense for U.S. President George H. W. Bush in 1989. Atwood wrote the proposal and directed the organization that developed and built the Apollo guidance system.

== Early history ==
The son of a grocer, Atwood was born May 25, 1924, in Haverhill, Massachusetts, 40 miles (64 km) North of Boston. He lived on a small farm adjoining the ancestral home of the Quaker poet John Greenleaf Whittier. Life on a small farm gave him a fascination with things mechanical and an appreciation for hard work. His parents' ambitions were to provide for him the opportunities they did not have. Following high school, Atwood was sent to Worcester Academy, a one-year college preparatory school. There he became interested in things technical. Atwood attended the Massachusetts Institute of Technology (MIT), with an interruption of service in Burma with the U.S. Army Signal Corps from 1943 to 1946. When he returned to MIT, Atwood married Sue Harian, a graduate of Tufts University, and completed his bachelor's and master's degrees in electrical engineering. He served as a research associate in MIT's Instrumentation Laboratory from 1948 to 1952. The head of the instrumentation lab was Dr. C. Stark Draper, the father of inertial guidance and navigation. Under Draper, Atwood contributed numerous patents to the science and became an expert in navigation and guidance electronics and systems engineering.

== Dynatrol Corporation ==
In 1952, Atwood and an associate, Fred Best, founded Dynatrol Corporation, a research company that developed and built inertial navigation and guidance systems for ballistic missiles. Atwood served as vice-president and treasurer of Dynatrol from 1952 to 1959. In 1959 General Motors purchased the company, including 50 employees along with Atwood to obtain the valuable navigation and guidance system technology.

== General Motors ==
Atwood was named associate director of the Boston Research and Development Laboratory of AC Spark Plug Division of General Motors (AC Delco) after the purchase. In 1961, Atwood was appointed director of engineering of Milwaukee operations of AC Spark Plug, a manufacturer of the Norden Bombsight and similar instruments during World War II. The Milwaukee operations of AC Spark Plug was made a separate division of General Motors as AC Electronics in the late 1960s, but as the space race wound down in the early 1970s, this division was merged with Delco Radio and the combined division was renamed Delco Electronics with headquarters in Kokomo, Indiana. In 1970, Atwood was appointed the Indianapolis (Indiana) Operations Manager for the newly formed Detroit Diesel Allison Division of GM. In 1974 he became the first general manager of GM's short lived Transportation Systems Division. Later in 1974 he was named general manager of Delco Electronics Division of GM. In 1978, Atwood was named a General Motors vice-president and General Manager of the Detroit Diesel Allison Division, In 1981 he was promoted to group executive in charge of the Electrical Components Group, and later that year, he was assigned responsibility for the worldwide Truck and Bus Group. In 1985 Atwood was named president of the Hughes Electronics Corporation, a subsidiary consisting of Delco Electronics and Hughes Aircraft. Also in 1985 he was named executive vice-president of General Motors and in 1987 he was made vice-chairman of the General Motors board; a member of the board's finance, executive and administrative committees; responsible for Electronic Data Systems (EDS), GMHE, and GM's Technical Staffs and GM corporate Information Management. Atwood had more than 150,000 employees under his management at that time. Two of the companies, Hughes and EDS, had founders who were high-profile billionaires.

== US Department of Defense ==
On January 26, 1989, President George H. W. Bush named Atwood as Deputy Secretary of Defense. Atwood's management and scientific skills were thought to be a complement to those of the Defense Secretary nominee, John G. Tower, who was expected to play a political and policy-setting role. Tower was not confirmed, and Dick Cheney became Secretary of Defense. Atwood served as Deputy Secretary for nearly four years. He returned to private life at the end of the Bush Administration in early 1993.

== Inertial Navigation ==
The Apollo Program in Milwaukee, Wisconsin were the glory years for Atwood. He had led the proposal team and as director of engineering and operations, he oversaw the Apollo program at AC Spark Plug. The program included a guidance and navigation system, an optical system, and a computer. Atwood's organization became the prime contractor. When asked about his contribution to the Apollo Program, Atwood would always downplay his contribution and let his people take the credit. In fact his contribution was "tremendous" said Hugh Brady, Atwood's program manager for Apollo. Atwood was involved with NASA at the launches at Cape Kennedy, led the negotiations for getting contracts and had total management responsibility. His interface with General Motors management was also important to the program. Atwood also represented General Motors on nationwide television's Today Show with Hugh Downs. Atwood would reflect later that it was this appearance was his "greatest risk". Atwood spent 30 minutes explaining to an anxious 20 million viewers what was happening with the Apollo 8 astronauts as they circled incommunicado around the far side of the Moon on Christmas Eve morning, 1968.

== Electronics for GM Vehicles ==
Atwood spent four years in Kokomo as general manager of Delco Electronics Division of General Motors and was primarily responsible for leading it into the high-tech age. He saw in Delco Electronics a company with great technical ability and a vast untapped potential. Much of its technical staff was working on low volume or one-off programs, in the design and construction of commercial digital systems for General Motors plants, and internal manufacturing support. On the automobile, the only places where electronics could be found on GM cars was in the voltage regulators, and radios. With radios, Delco Electronics was losing market share rapidly to a foreign invasion of radios into GM dealerships. Also the anticipated technology transfer to commercial grade inertial guidance systems was not making much progress. Atwood was determined to change all this.

Atwood initiated programs in Kokomo to turn back the foreign invasion of radios with improved products with new features and functions that made the radio more integrated with the vehicle controls (such as integration with steering wheel controls). In Milwaukee, he reinvigorated the commercial Carousel inertial navigation system by selling it to the military. Atwood also laid the groundwork for Delco Electronics' international operations - a move that kept Delco Electronics in the radio and climate control businesses.

It was in the field of microprocessing that Atwood, an expert in electronics control, saw the most growth potential. "It was apparent that microprocessors would open a whole new field in control electronics." Atwood said, "and that Delco Electronics would become critical - the heart and soul of the electronics revolution for General Motors. I had faith in our ability to do the job." Atwood took that faith into negotiations with General Motors and the other GM divisions who also thought that it was their destiny to control their systems with their own electronics design. Atwood did prevail and negotiated GM's engine control business for Delco Electronics and then brought the product on stream. In 1989, the company was producing 28,000 engine control modules a day.

== Death ==
Atwood Jr. died on April 24, 1994, at a hospital in Royal Oak, Michigan while recovering from surgery for a bleeding ulcer at the age of 69.

Defense Secretary William J. Perry noted that Atwood had served as Deputy Secretary of defense during a period of dramatic change. Perry said "His Tenure saw the collapse of Soviet communism and the triumph of liberty in Eastern Europe, the victory of U.S. and allied forces in Desert Storm, and the first years of downsizing of America's defense establishment", Perry said in a statement.

== Footnotes ==
Political offices
Preceded by William Howard Taft IV	United States Deputy Secretary of Defense; 1989–1993	Succeeded by William Perry
