= Electronic Defense Laboratories =

Electronic Defense Laboratories, located in Mountain View, California, known in the 1960s and 1970s simply as "EDL", was a semi-private corporate entity, essentially funded by the Department of Defense, that drew heavily on civilian scientific expertise. It was created in 1954 as an extension of the new Electronic System Division (in Buffalo, New York) of Sylvania Electric Products and directed by William J. Perry, later U.S. Secretary of Defense, who served as director of Sylvania/GTE's Electronic Defense Laboratories in California from 1954 to 1964 before becoming president of ESL, Inc.

EDL assisted the U.S. Army Security Agency's early telemetry-intelligence program, including support for the establishment of telemetry analysis capabilities and collection facilities at Sinop, Turkey, and Shemya, Alaska, by early 1957.

Other projects included development of reconnaissance and countermeasures receivers for various covert and military applications. In the early 1960s, Sylvania Systems-Electronic Defense Laboratories performed aircraft modifications for the SEABRINE telemetry-collection equipment system and provided system maintenance at operating locations for EA-3B operations.
