= Caspar Weinberger =

American politician and businessman (1917–2006)

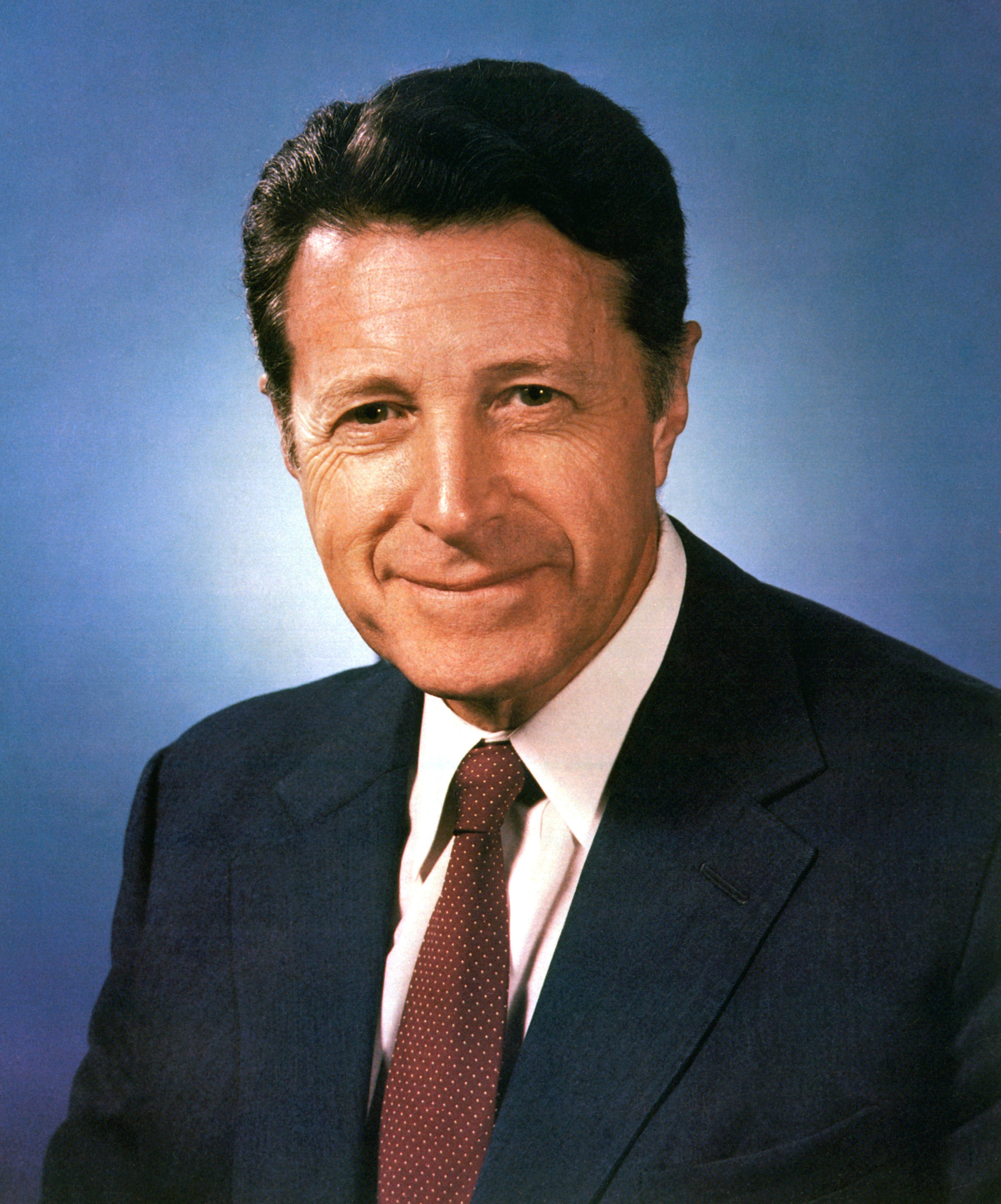
- Official portrait, 1980s

15th United States Secretary of Defense
- In office January 21, 1981 – November 23, 1987
- President: Ronald Reagan
- Deputy: Frank Carlucci; W. Paul Thayer; William Taft IV
- Preceded by: Harold Brown
- Succeeded by: Frank Carlucci

10th United States Secretary of Health, Education, and Welfare
- In office February 12, 1973 – August 8, 1975
- President: Richard Nixon; Gerald Ford
- Preceded by: Elliot Richardson
- Succeeded by: F. David Mathews

20th Director of the Office of Management and Budget
- In office June 12, 1972 – February 1, 1973
- President: Richard Nixon
- Preceded by: George Shultz
- Succeeded by: Roy Ash

Chair of the Federal Trade Commission
- In office December 31, 1969 – August 6, 1970
- President: Richard Nixon
- Preceded by: Paul Dixon
- Succeeded by: Miles Kirkpatrick

Director of the California Department of Finance
- In office March 1, 1968 – December 31, 1969
- Governor: Ronald Reagan
- Preceded by: Gordon P. Smith
- Succeeded by: Verne Orr

Chair of the California Republican Party
- In office 1962–1964
- Preceded by: John Krehbiel
- Succeeded by: Gaylord Parkinson

Member of the California State Assembly from the 21st district
- In office January 5, 1953 – January 5, 1959
- Preceded by: Arthur H. Connolly Jr.
- Succeeded by: Milton Marks

Personal details
- Born: Caspar Willard Weinberger; August 18, 1917 San Francisco, California, U.S.
- Died: March 28, 2006 (aged 88) Bangor, Maine, U.S.
- Resting place: Arlington National Cemetery
- Party: Republican
- Spouse: Jane Dalton (m. 1942)
- Children: 2
- Education: Harvard University (BA, LLB)

Military service
- Allegiance: United States
- Branch/service: United States Army
- Years of service: 1941–1945
- Rank: Captain
- Unit: 41st Infantry Division
- Battles/wars: World War II

Caspar Willard Weinberger (August 18, 1917 – March 28, 2006) was an American politician and businessman who served in a variety of state and federal positions for three decades as a Republican, most notably as Secretary of Defense under President Ronald Reagan from 1981 to 1987. During the Iran–Contra investigation, he was indicted on charges of lying to Congress and obstructing government investigations but was pardoned by President George H. W. Bush before facing trial.

Weinberger was a member of the California State Assembly from 1953 to 1959. He also served as Chairman of the Federal Trade Commission and Director of the Office of Management and Budget under presidents Richard Nixon and Gerald Ford. He later became vice president and general counsel of Bechtel Corporation.

Weinberger's tenure as Secretary of Defense was marked by his hard line against the Soviet Union, in disagreement with the State Department. He promoted the Strategic Defense Initiative, an orbital weapons program. Weinberger was awarded both the Presidential Medal of Freedom by Ronald Reagan in 1987 and an honorary British knighthood from Queen Elizabeth II. In 1993, he became Chairman of Forbes magazine.

== Early life ==
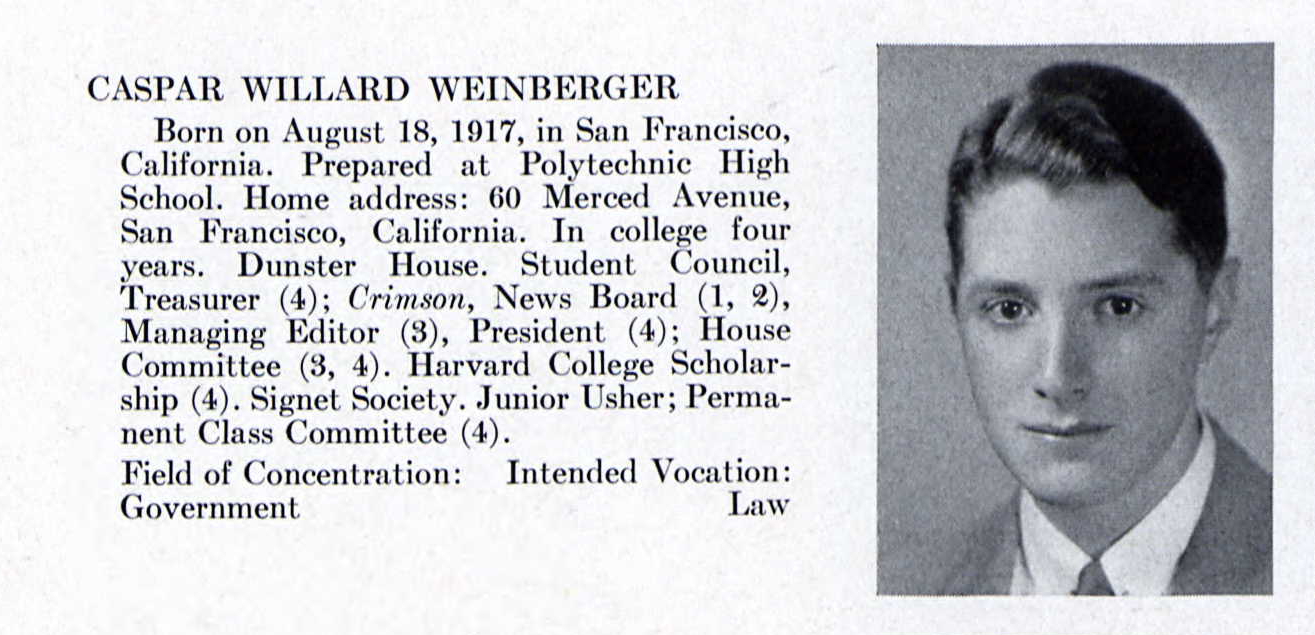
Weinberger in the Harvard University yearbook, 1938

Weinberger was born on August 18, 1917, in San Francisco, the younger of two sons of Herman Weinberger (1886–1944), an attorney, and Cerise Carpenter Weinberger (née Hampson; 1886–1975), a music teacher. His father was of Jewish descent from Bohemia of Austria-Hungary, while his maternal grandparents were English immigrants who settled in Wisconsin. Caspar Weinberger's father, Herman, was the younger brother of Luella Weinberger McNeill, mother of Don McNeill. The 1910 Census shows Herman and Luella living in the household of Nathan Weinberger, the grandfather of Caspar Weinberger.

Weinberger's paternal grandparents had left Judaism over a religious dispute while living in Bohemia. He was raised in a home with no denominational ties, though with a socially Christian orientation. Weinberger would later become an active Episcopalian and often expressed his faith in God. Weinberger had stated that his mother's Episcopal religion was "an enormous influence and comfort all my life".

=== Education ===
Weinberger attended San Francisco Polytechnic High School. He was academically gifted and gained admission to Harvard University, graduating in 1938 with a B.A., magna cum laude. Weinberger was offered a scholarship to study at the University of Cambridge but instead attended Harvard Law School, graduating in 1941 with a Bachelor of Laws.

== Career ==
=== Military service ===
After graduating from Harvard Law School, Weinberger enlisted in the U.S. Army as a private. He was sent to the Army's Officer Candidate School at Fort Benning, Georgia, where he was commissioned a second lieutenant. During World War II, he served with the 41st Infantry Division in the Pacific; by the war's end, he was a captain on the intelligence staff of General Douglas MacArthur. Early in life, Weinberger developed an interest in politics and history, and, during the war years, a special admiration for Winston Churchill, whom he would later cite as an important influence in his life. From 1945 to 1947, Weinberger was a law clerk for U.S. circuit judge William Edwin Orr of the United States Court of Appeals for the Ninth Circuit. He then entered private practice at a San Francisco law firm.

=== California politics ===
In 1952, Weinberger entered the race for California's 21st State Assembly district in the San Francisco Bay area as a Republican at the persuasion of his wife, Jane Weinberger, who also served as his campaign manager. He won and was reelected in 1954 and 1956. As the chairman of the Assembly Government Organization Committee, Weinberger was responsible for the creation of the California Department of Water Resources and was instrumental in the creation of the California State Water Project. Weinberger also unsuccessfully opposed the construction of the Embarcadero Freeway, saying it would ruin the view of the Bay and damage property values. Weinberger felt vindicated when the freeway was removed after the 1989 earthquake. Although unsuccessful in his 1958 campaign for California Attorney General, Weinberger continued to be active in politics and was chosen by Nixon in 1962 to become chairman of the California Republican Party.

Governor Ronald Reagan named him chairman of the Commission on California State Government Organization and Economy in 1967 and appointed him State director of finance early in 1968. Weinberger moved to Washington in January 1970 to become chairman of the Federal Trade Commission. He is credited for having revitalized the FTC by enforcing consumer protection.

=== Nixon cabinet ===
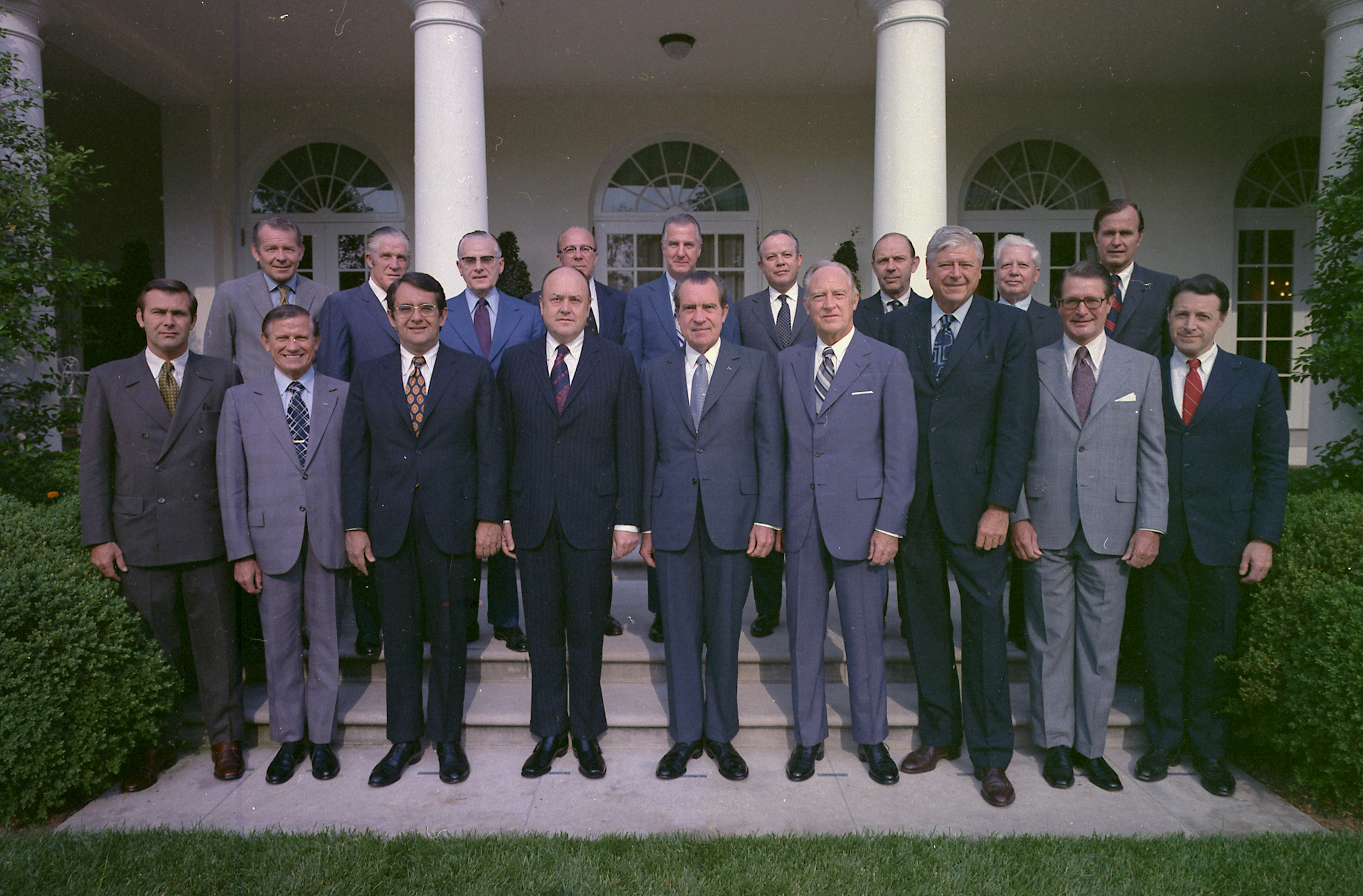
Weinberger in a group photo of Nixon's cabinet on June 16, 1972, far right in the front row.

Weinberger subsequently served under President Richard Nixon as deputy director (1970–1972) and director (1972–1973) of the Office of Management and Budget and Secretary of Health, Education, and Welfare (1973–1975). While serving in the Office of Management and Budget, Weinberger earned the nickname "Cap the Knife" for his cost-cutting ability. For the next five years, Weinberger was vice president and general counsel of the Bechtel Corporation in California.

=== Relf v. Weinberger ===
In 1973, the Southern Poverty Law Center named Weinberger as a defendant in a case that sought restitution for the forced non-consensual sterilization and medical experimentation on three young Black American girls, Minnie Lee, Mary Alice, and Katie Relf in Montgomery, Alabama. An employee of Montgomery's federally-funded Community Action organization took the Relf sisters to a family planning clinic under the pretext of needing “shots.” Staff gave Katie Relf a then-experimental birth control shot as well as inserted a contraceptive IUD device without parental knowledge or consent. On a separate occasion, doctors surgically sterilized Minnie Lee and Mary Alice who were twelve and fourteen years old respectively. At the time of the suit, the Office of Economic Opportunity was preparing to hand over funding and control of its associated family planning clinics to Weinberger's Department of Health, Education, and Welfare.

The SPLC's complaint shows that the O.E.O. recently began providing funding for such sterilization procedures, while top OEO personnel intentionally did not distribute a medical memo containing guidelines on obtaining patient consent for such operations. Dr. Warren M. Hern authored the memo, and ultimately resigned in outrage that the guidelines were not distributed. Copies of the memo, which included age of consent laws whose criteria the Relf girls did not meet, sat undistributed in a DC warehouse. At the time of the suit, Weinberger's most recent approved Health, Education, and Welfare budget included specific funding allotments for sterilization procedures, and thus he was named a defendant in the case. A district court involved in Relf V. Weinberger hearings found that anywhere from 100,000 to 150,000 poor people were sterilized annually using federal dollars, and some among those sterilized were coerced into the procedures by doctors who threatened to cut off welfare benefits. The case shone fresh light on numerous state sterilization and eugenics programs nationwide and led to compensation funds and settlements for some victims.

=== Secretary of Defense ===
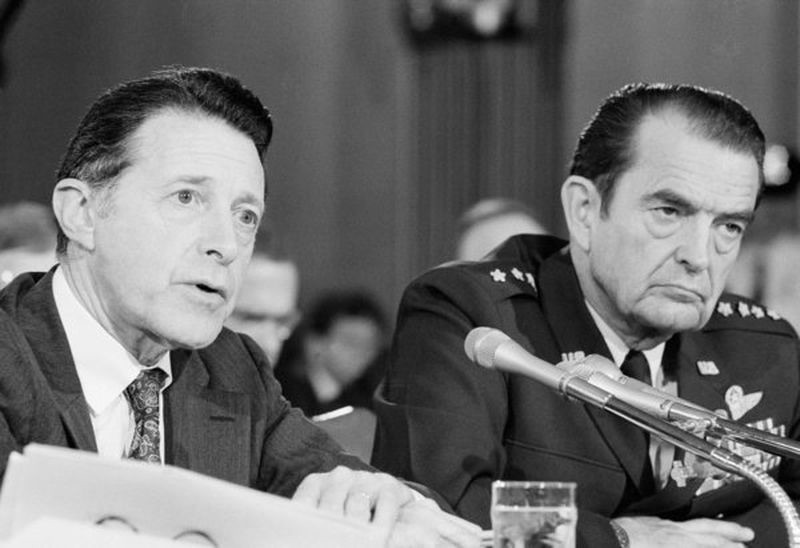
U.S. Secretary of Defense Caspar Weinberger with Chairman of the Joint Chiefs of Staff General David C. Jones during Senate Armed Services Committee Hearings at Capitol Hill.

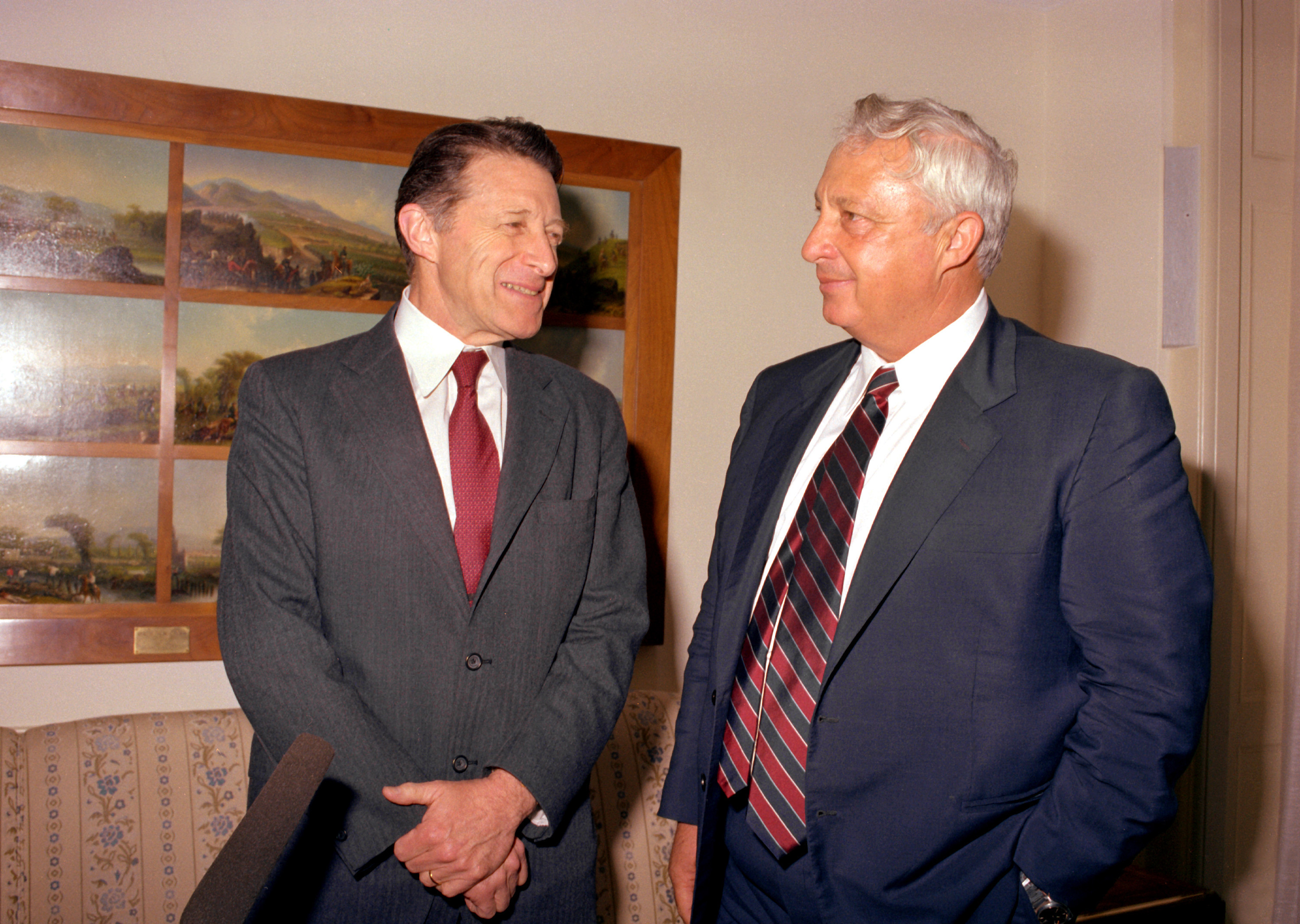
Secretary of Defense Caspar Weinberger (left) with Israeli Minister of Defense Ariel Sharon, 1982

Weinberger was vying for Reagan to appoint him as Secretary of State but was given the position of Secretary of Defense instead.

Weinberger took the lead in implementing a rollback strategy against Soviet communism. In 1984, journalist Nicholas Lemann interviewed Weinberger and summarized the strategy of the Reagan administration to roll back the Soviet Union:

Their society is economically weak, and it lacks the wealth, education, and technology to enter the information age. They have thrown everything into military production, and their society is starting to show terrible stress as a result. They can't sustain military production the way we can. Eventually it will break them, and then there will be just one superpower in a safe world – if, only if, we can keep spending.

Lemann notes that when he wrote that in 1984, he thought the Reaganites were living in a fantasy world. But in 2016, he says, that passage represents "a fairly uncontroversial description of what Reagan actually did".

Although not widely experienced in defense matters, Weinberger had a reputation in Washington as an able administrator; his powers as a cost cutter earned him the sobriquet "Cap the Knife". He shared Ronald Reagan's conviction that the Soviet Union posed a serious threat to the United States, and that the defense establishment needed to be modernized and strengthened. Belying his nickname, at the Pentagon Weinberger became a vigorous advocate of Reagan's plan to increase the Department of Defense budget. Readiness, sustainability, and modernization became the watchwords of the defense program. In his early years at the Pentagon, Cap Weinberger was known as "Cap the Ladle" for advocating large increases in defense spending.

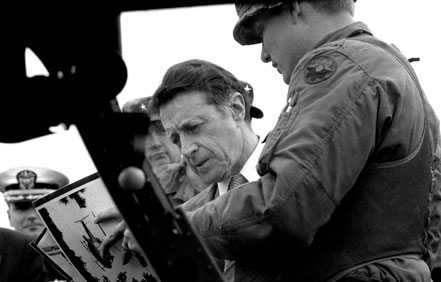
Caspar Weinberger inspecting new hardware, Fort Lewis, Washington on April 22, 1983

As Secretary of Defense, Weinberger oversaw a massive rebuilding of US military strength. Major defense programs he championed included the B-1B bomber and the "600-ship Navy". His efforts created economic and military-industrial pressures that were associated with the beginning of Perestroika and the beginning of the end of both the Cold War and the Soviet Union. However, this thesis was contested by a study on the causes of the collapse of the Soviet Union by two prominent economists from the World Bank – William Easterly, and Stanley Fischer from MIT: "... the study concludes that the increased Soviet defense spending provoked by Mr. Reagan's policies was not the straw that broke the back of the Evil Empire. The Soviet war in Afghanistan and the Soviet response to Mr. Reagan's Star Wars program caused only a relatively small rise in [USSR] defense costs. The massive US defense effort throughout the period from 1960 to 1987 contributed only marginally to Soviet economic decline."

The same study points out the key reason for the economic decline of the USSR was relying on centrally-planned industrial-expansion to drive economic growth, rather than driving growth by increasing worker productivity via incentives; France and Japan were also mentioned (in 1994) as other centrally-planned economies that could soon experience similar troubles. While the Reagan Doctrine was not a key factor in causing the economic implosion of the USSR, which was driven by internal contradictions, the Reagan proxy-rollback policy of the 1980s (which replaced Détente that Nixon and Carter generally pursued during the 1970s) was the key factor in preventing expansion of the Soviet economic empire, and sustenance of their declining domestic economy from external sources. Reagan was one of the few people to predict this possibility. The final piece of the puzzle was the Soviet leadership: Brezhnev, Andropov, and Chernenko were hardline Communists, and prevented any significant changes, but Gorbachev was a reformer—and once economic reforms and political reforms began, they became unstoppable. British journalist Bernard Levin wrote in 1977:

I do not believe it possible that the thirst for freedom and decency in the countries of the Soviet Empire can remain much longer unslaked, and that any attempt ... to satisfy it by real reforms, will be cataclysmically destructive of the eroded foundations of the entire State system. ... there will be no stopping the tide once the first sluice has been opened. Memories of the Czech tragedy of 1968 will still be fresh ... the most significant element of the Prague Spring was the way in which, once Mr Dubcek had shown that he supported the Czech desire for liberation, no attempt by him and his equally brave colleagues to go slowly proved availing — the scent of freedom in the nostrils of his people was too strong.

These events came at the cost of helping to triple the US national debt, and funding radicals. Weinberger pushed for dramatic increases in the United States' nuclear funding, and was a strong advocate of the controversial SDI, an initiative which proposed a space- and ground-based missile defense shield.

Weinberger was reluctant to commit the armed forces, keeping only a token force of American marines in Lebanon that then became victims in the October 1983 Beirut barracks bombing. In the wake of that terrible event, he laid out his engagement policy in a November 1984 speech on "The Uses of Military Power" at the National Press Club as the Six Tests.

Unlike President Reagan and Secretary of State Shultz, Weinberger did not regard any of Gorbachev's actions—whether it was perestroika or glasnost—as reassuring indicators of his stated intentions. "Not only did Gorbachev give up all of the Soviet 'non-negotiable' demands [regarding the INF Treaty], but he gave us precisely the kind of treaty that the President had sought for seven years. That act of course does not mean—any more than does the Soviet withdrawal from Afghanistan—that the USSR has given up its long-term aggressive designs." Initially, Reagan's views were in line with Weinberger's views, but he began to reevaluate his perception of Gorbachev's intentions in 1987, the year Gorbachev accepted the U.S. proposal on INF.

Weinberger resigned as Secretary of Defense on November 6, 1987.

==== Iran–Contra affair ====
The Iran–Contra affair concerned the selling of US missiles to Iran. The funds received from Iran were then channeled to guerilla rebels known as Contras, who were fighting the socialist government of Nicaragua. Such funding had been specifically denied by the US Congress.

Though he claimed to have been opposed to the sale on principle, Weinberger participated in the transfer of United States Hawk and TOW missiles to Iran at that time.

Iran–Contra resulted in a major scandal with several investigations which resulted in fourteen Reagan administration officials being indicted.

After his resignation as Secretary of Defense, legal proceedings against Weinberger were continued by Independent Counsel Lawrence E. Walsh. On June 17, 1992, Weinberger was indicted on five felony charges related to the Iran-contra affair, including accusations that he had lied to Congress and obstructed Government investigations. He was defended by defense attorney Carl Rauh.

Prosecutors brought an additional indictment just four days before the 1992 presidential election. This was controversial because it cited a Weinberger diary entry contradicting a claim made by President George H. W. Bush. Republicans claimed that this action contributed to Bush's later defeat. On December 11, 1992, Judge Thomas F. Hogan threw out this indictment because it violated the five-year statute of limitations and improperly broadened the original charges.

Before Weinberger could be tried on the original charges, he received a pardon on December 24, 1992, from Bush, who had been Reagan's vice president during the scandal.

=== Later career ===
External videos
- Booknotes interview with Weinberger on Fighting for Peace, July 15, 1990, C-SPAN

Weinberger had been Secretary of Defense for six years and ten months, longer than anyone except for Robert McNamara and more recently Donald Rumsfeld. After Weinberger left the Pentagon, he joined Forbes, Inc., in 1989 as publisher of Forbes magazine. He was named chairman in 1993. Over the next decade, he wrote frequently on defense and national security issues. In 1990, he wrote Fighting for Peace, an account of his Pentagon years. In 1996, Weinberger co-authored a book entitled The Next War, which raised questions about the adequacy of U.S. military capabilities following the end of the Cold War.

He was a member of the Founding Council of the Rothermere American Institute at the University of Oxford and a fellow at the Institute for Advanced Studies in the Humanities at the University of Edinburgh.

In 1996, Weinberger was the first host of World Business Review, a television infomercial series.

== Personal life ==
In 1942, Weinberger married the former Rebecca Jane Dalton (1918–2009). A World War II Army nurse, and later author and publisher, she "coaxed her husband ... into politics and was a loyal Washington wife during three Republican administrations before she began to write and publish children's books".

Arlin Cerise Weinberger was born on 1943-04-27, in Maine, and Caspar Willard Weinberger Jr. was born 1947-01-09, in San Francisco, to Rebecca Jane (née Dalton) and Caspar Willard Weinberger Sr.

=== Death ===
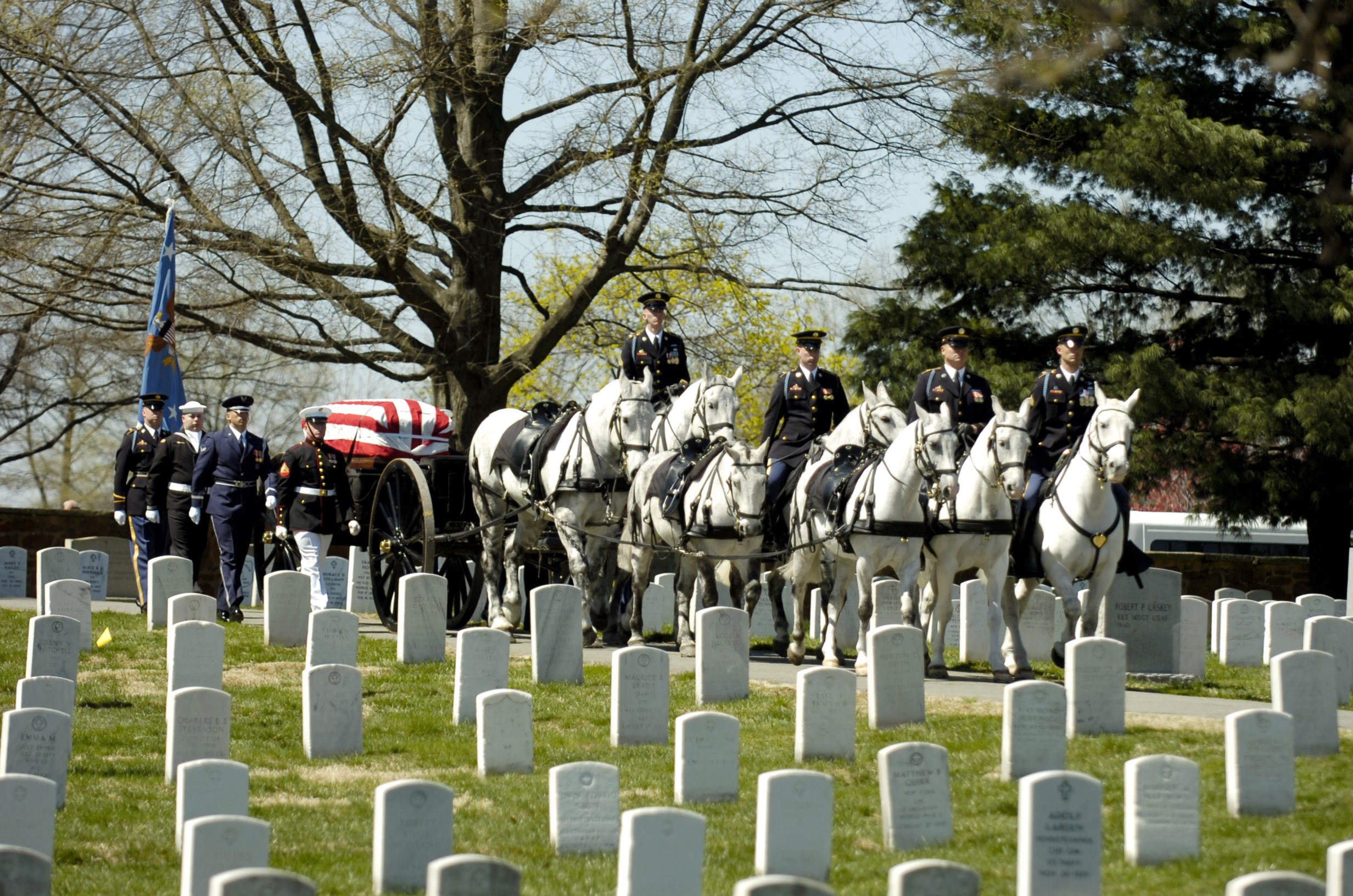
Weinberger's funeral at Arlington National Cemetery

While residing on Mount Desert Island, Weinberger was treated for and died from complications of pneumonia at Eastern Maine Medical Center in Bangor, Maine, aged 88. He was survived by his wife, their two children, and several grandchildren.

He is buried in Section 30, Grave 835–1 at Arlington National Cemetery on April 4, 2006.

Shortly after his death George W. Bush in a public statement said:

Caspar Weinberger was an American statesman and a dedicated public servant. He wore the uniform in World War II, held elected office, and served in the cabinets of three Presidents. As Secretary of Defense for President Reagan, he worked to strengthen our military and win the Cold War. In all his years, this good man made many contributions to our Nation. America is grateful for Caspar Weinberger's lifetime of service. Laura and I send our condolences and prayers to the entire Weinberger family.

Then Secretary of Defense Donald Rumsfeld stated:

Cap Weinberger was a friend. His extensive career in public service, his support for the men and women in uniform and his central role in helping to win the Cold War leave a lasting legacy ... He left the United States armed forces stronger, our country safer and the world more free.

== Awards ==
- Presidential Medal of Freedom in 1987.
- Honorary Knight Grand Cross of the Order of the British Empire in 1988, awarded in recognition for an "outstanding and invaluable" contribution to military cooperation between the UK and the US, particularly during the Falklands War of 1982.
- Weinberger was awarded the Gold Star Award by the International Strategic Studies Association for Outstanding Contributions to Strategic Progress Through Humanitarian Achievement.
- Weinberger was inducted into the United States Army Officer Candidate School Hall of Fame in 1981, the highest honor that can be bestowed on any graduate from the school.
- The Walter F. Patenge Medal of Public Service from the Michigan State University College of Osteopathic Medicine in 1975.
- Golden Plate Award of the American Academy of Achievement in 1975.

== See also ==
- List of people pardoned or granted clemency by the president of the United States
- List of former FTC commissioners

Political offices
Preceded by Paul Dixon	Chair of the Federal Trade Commission; 1969–1970	Succeeded by Miles Kirkpatrick
Preceded by George Shultz	Director of the Office of Management and Budget; 1972–1973	Succeeded by Roy Ash
Preceded by Elliot Richardson	United States Secretary of Health, Education, and Welfare; 1973–1975	Succeeded by David Mathews
Preceded by Harold Brown	United States Secretary of Defense; 1981–1987	Succeeded by Frank Carlucci
