= W. Paul Thayer =

American test pilot, flying ace, aviation executive and Deputy Secretary of Defense

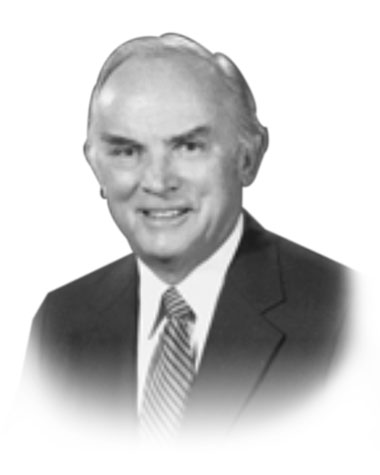

20th United States Deputy Secretary of Defense
- In office January 12, 1983 – January 4, 1984
- President: Ronald Reagan
- Preceded by: Frank Carlucci
- Succeeded by: William Howard Taft IV

Personal details
- Born: William Paul Thayer; November 23, 1919 Henryetta, Oklahoma, U.S.
- Died: May 6, 2010 (aged 90)
- Education: University of Kansas

Military service
- Allegiance: United States
- Branch/service: United States Navy
- Years of service: 1941–1946
- Rank: Lieutenant Commander
- Unit: Fighter Squadron 26
- Battles/wars: World War II
- Awards: Distinguished Flying Cross (3); Air Medal (10)

William Paul Thayer (November 23, 1919 – May 6, 2010) was an American test pilot, flying ace, aviation executive, and United States Deputy Secretary of Defense during the Reagan Administration.

== Biography ==
W. Paul Thayer was born November 23, 1919, in Henryetta, Oklahoma and attended high school in Wichita, Kansas. After a high school, he attended Wichita State University, then spent a year working as an oil field roughneck, before enrolling at the University of Kansas, where he majored in petroleum engineering. During his time in college, he enrolled in the Civilian Pilot Training Program in order to train as a pilot.

After college, Thayer entered the Naval Aviation Cadet Program in mid-1941, earning his wings as a naval aviator in March 1942. His posting in the United States Navy during World War II was with Fighter Squadron 26 (VF-26). Thayer flew a F4F Wildcat and became a flying ace, with six confirmed and four probable aerial victories, and nine further Japanese Air Force aircraft destroyed on the ground. He also participated in the sinking of a Japanese destroyer. Thayer honorably resigned from the navy as a lieutenant commander following the end of World War II.

Immediately after leaving the navy, Thayer worked as a transport pilot for Trans World Airlines for two years. He then joined the Chance Vought Aircraft Company as a test pilot in 1948. There, he rose rapidly through the ranks, becoming Chief Test Pilot in 1949, Flight Test Director, Vice President of Sales in 1951, and finally Company President in 1961. In 1968, he was awarded the James H. Doolittle Award. In 1965, the company was reorganized as Ling-Temco-Vought (LTV), and Thayer became president of LTV.

In 1970, LTV Aerospace was in deep financial distress and Thayer took over as chief executive officer of LTV. Thayer managed to successfully turn the company around. Thayer was deeply involved in the business community in the 1970s, serving as president of the United States Chamber of Commerce and as a member of The Conference Board.

On December 6, 1982, President of the United States Ronald Reagan nominated Thayer to be United States Deputy Secretary of Defense. After confirmation by the United States Senate, he was sworn in on January 12, 1983. He served as Deputy Secretary of Defense until January 4, 1984, when he resigned amid inquiries into charges of furnishing confidential stock market information, and was replaced by William Howard Taft IV. In June 1985, Thayer was sentenced to four years in prison for the obstructing justice during the insider trading case.

Paul Thayer died on May 6, 2010. He is the father of actress Brynn Thayer.

Political offices
Preceded by Frank Carlucci	United States Deputy Secretary of Defense; 1983–1984	Succeeded by William Howard Taft IV
