= Marik String =

American lawyer

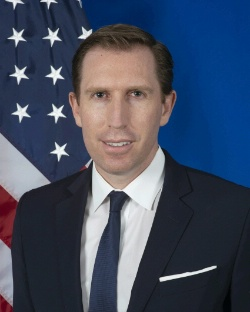

Acting Legal Adviser of the Department of State
- In office June 1, 2019 – January 20, 2021
- President: Donald Trump
- Preceded by: Jennifer Gillian Newstead
- Succeeded by: Richard C. Visek (acting)

Personal details
- Education: University of Notre Dame (BA); Georgetown University (JD); University of Vienna (MA)

Military service
- Branch: United States Navy

Marik String is an American attorney, national security expert, and U.S. Navy officer, who served as Acting Legal Adviser of the U.S. Department of State from 2019 to 2021.

== Education ==
String earned a Bachelor of Arts degree from the University of Notre Dame and Juris Doctor from the Georgetown University Law Center. During law school, he was the editor of The Georgetown Law Journal and a Global Law Scholar. String earned a Master of Arts degree from the University of Vienna as a Fulbright Scholar and speaks fluent German.

== Career ==
String is an officer in the United States Navy Reserve. From 2006–2013, he served on the United States Senate Committee on Foreign Relations, where he acted as Deputy Chief Counsel and Senior Professional Staff Member for European and Eurasian Affairs covering issues related to Russia, NATO, and the European Union. He then worked as an attorney at Wilmer Cutler Pickering Hale and Dorr, where he specialized in economic sanctions and national security law. He was also an affiliated scholar at the Atlantic Council of the United States and Aspen Institute Berlin (Germany). String later served in various leadership positions within the United States Department of State's Bureau of Political-Military Affairs, including as Acting Assistant Secretary of State for Political-Military Affairs. String also served as a senior advisor to the United States Deputy Secretary of State, John J. Sullivan.

String was selected to serve as acting Legal Adviser of the Department of State in 2019, succeeding Jennifer Gillian Newstead. As acting legal adviser from 2019–2021, he served as the chief legal officer for the U.S. Department of State and directed the Office of the Legal Adviser's 375 attorneys and staff. He played a central role in the bilateral claims settlement agreement between the United States and Sudan, under which Sudan agreed to pay $335 million in compensation to resolve terrorism-related claims brought by the U.S. families of victims of the 1998 bombings of the U.S. embassies in Kenya and Tanzania and the 2000 attack on the USS Cole. The claims agreement was part of a broader diplomatic initiative to restore Sudan's sovereign immunity under the Sudan Claims Resolution Act and establish diplomatic relations between Sudan and Israel under the U.S.-negotiated Abraham Accords, the normalization agreements between Israel and various Arab states.

He served as Agent of the United States before various international courts and tribunals, including the International Court of Justice (ICJ) and Iran-U.S. Claims Tribunal (The Hague). He argued before the ICJ in Islamic Republic of Iran v. United States of America (Alleged Violations of the 1955 Treaty of Amity, Economic Relations, and Consular Rights), in which Iran challenged the United States' re-imposition of sanctions following the U.S. withdrawal from the Joint Comprehensive Plan of Action (JCPOA). He also served as Agent of the United States in Islamic Republic of Iran v. United States of America (Certain Iranian Assets), in which Iran challenged the freezing of nearly $2 billion in assets held by the Iranian bank, Bank Markazi, in connection with compensation for U.S. victims of Iranian terrorism shortly after the U.S. Supreme Court decided the case Bank Markazi v. Peterson. He serves as one of four U.S. members of the Permanent Court of Arbitration (The Hague) and the U.S. National Group, the nominating body for ICJ judges. During his tenure, String also appeared on various briefs before the U.S. Supreme Court, including in Federal Republic of Germany v. Philipp, which examined the scope of the expropriation exception of the Foreign Sovereign Immunities Act (FSIA), Nestle USA, Inc. v. Doe, which examined the scope and application of the Alien Tort Statute (ATS), Republic of Hungary v. Simon, which examined the application of the doctrines of international comity and forum non conveniens under the FSIA, and Mutond v. Lewis, which involved the scope and determination of conduct-based immunity for foreign officials in civil litigation in the United States. He left office in January 2021.
