= Analysis of the 2026 Iran war =

The 2026 Iran war has been analysed in terms of its possible military and political consequences for the Islamic Republic of Iran, United States, Israel and other belligerents, and from international legal and geopolitical standpoints.

In the early months of the war, some analysts argued that Iran's ability to preserve the Islamic Republic, strike American bases, and disrupt the Strait of Hormuz showed the limits of American military power. Other analysts cautioned against treating the Islamic Republic's survival as a strategic victory. The US and Israel inflicted severe losses on Iran's conventional capabilities despite Iran's ability to impose costs on American allies. Michael Froman, president of the Council on Foreign Relations, argued after the first ceasefire that it was "simply too soon to tell" whether the war had advanced American interests, citing both American military achievements and Iran's use of the Strait as leverage.

Since hostilities resumed in July, analysts have considered the war outcome unresolved. In August, Reuters' columnist Ron Bousso described the conflict as a stalemate in which neither side had shown a convincing strategy for breaking the deadlock.

Donald Trump's threats to destroy Iranian infrastructure have drawn warnings from international law experts that such actions could constitute war crimes under the Rome Statute, and be actionable under universal jurisdiction.

== Objectives ==
The Trump administration has sent mixed messages concerning the objectives of the Iran war, from a preemptive attack to regime change, and preventing Iran from achieving nuclear weapons. Some analysts noted the lack of a clear objective when starting the conflict. According to Mohamad Bazzi, director of New York University's Hagop Kevorkian Center for Near Eastern Studies, Trump began laying the groundwork for apocalyptic threats against Iran just weeks into the war, after it became clear that the United States would not achieve the swift military victory he had hoped for, while his repeated threats to "wipe out" Iran risk normalizing mass violence.

== Legality ==
Many experts argue that the war is illegal under US law because launching a war requires congressional authorization. The war is also considered to be in violation of the UN Charter's prohibition on the use of force, because the attacks fail to meet the criteria for self-defense and lack authorization from the United Nations Security Council. In response, the Trump administration claimed that previous presidents have also launched unauthorized military actions, and dismissed international law. In international criminal law, experts have identified the attacks as a crime of aggression, specifically as a war of aggression. The US attack also violates the Algiers Accords (1981) in which the US agreed not to intervene politically or militarily in Iran's internal affairs. Numerous critics and analysts identified the US-Israeli attack with a more open embrace of expansionism and imperialism by the Trump administration, and a departure from the norms of the liberal international order.

=== Algiers Accords ===
The United States pledges that it is and from now on will be the policy of the United States not to intervene, directly or indirectly, politically or militarily, in Iran’s internal affairs.

— Algiers Accords (1981), General Declaration, Point I, Paragraph 1.

According to the Point I of the General Declaration of the Algiers Accords between Iran and the United States, the United States pledged that it would no longer intervene in Iranian internal affairs. Iran has sued the US in the Iran-United States Claims Tribunal (IUSCT) in The Hague over the 2026 war, invoking the Algiers Accords.

=== United States law ===
Many legal and military experts said that US actions in Iran are a type that require congressional authorization. They also noted the frequent use of the word "war" in Trump administration communication about the strikes, supporting the claim that the Trump administration had bypassed congressional war powers. Rubio said that the Trump administration had followed the War Powers Resolution, but questioned whether it was legally binding. Multiple American presidents and administrations have launched wars or military operations without congressional approval. Legal experts have argued that Trump's actions in Iran can be distinguished from prior non-authorized uses of force because the "speculative pre-emptive" justification for this war is comparatively weak when measured against past domestic and international legal rationales. On 27 April 2026, Erwin Chemerinsky wrote, "if the war continues through Friday without congressional approval, it will clearly be illegal, having passed the 60-day threshold and the 48-hour notice period that the president is given, under the War Powers Resolution of 1973, to conduct this kind of military operation."

US State Department Legal Adviser Reed D. Rubinstein argued that the US strikes on Iran were justified, as they were launched "in the collective self-defense of its Israeli ally, as well as in the exercise of the United States' own inherent right of self-defense," asserting that the military campaign was not a new war but rather a continuation of the ongoing conflict deriving from "Iran's malign aggression over decades" since the 1979 Islamic Revolution. This included the Iranian attacks on Israel in April and October 2024, Iranian proxy warfare against the US and Israel, and Iran's nuclear program. Qatar Tribune expressed that the justifications for war against Iran by American officials was reminiscent of 2003 where like the argument of supposed weapons of mass destruction (WMDs) construction by Iraq, war proponents argued that Iran was also pursuing WMDs or similar weapons and that the United States needed to intervene militarily.

On 13 March, the US Secretary of Defense Pete Hegseth stated "... no quarter, no mercy for our enemies." Aside from being "especially prohibited" in international law to "declare that no quarter will be given," it is also prohibited in the US Department of Defense's own law of war manual. Hegseth's statement likely violates US War Crimes statute 18 U.S.C. § 2441.

On 5 April, Trump repeatedly threatened to bomb all of Iran's bridges and power plants if it did not agree to a deal to end the war, setting a deadline of 8:00 p.m. EDT on 7 April. Trump wrote in a Truth Social post that "a whole civilization will die" if Iran refused to comply. Lieutenant Colonel Rachel VanLandingham, a professor at Southwestern Law School, told PBS News that targeting electricity systems could affect access to clean water, many civilian facilities including hospitals, and terrify the population. VanLandingham said Trump's rhetoric could constitute a violation of US law, which prohibits "measures of intimidation against a civilian population", including efforts primarily intended to "sow terror amongst that civilian population".

=== International law ===
==== Legality of US-Israeli attacks ====
The joint US–Israeli attacks on Iran are widely considered illegal under international law, as they violate the UN Charter's prohibition on the use of force because they fail to meet the criteria for self-defense and were not authorized by the United Nations Security Council. There is no recognized legal basis for preventive war or forcible regime change. The attacks have been, therefore, considered a war of aggression.

Ben Saul, UN special rapporteur on human rights and counter-terrorism, stated that Iran had not enriched uranium to the point of building a nuclear device, that experts agreed Iran did not possess a nuclear weapon, and that the case was nowhere close to being self-defense against an imminent attack. Don Rothwell, a professor of international law at the Australian National University, stated that the Security Council did not pass a resolution to attack Iran and had no legal basis for justifying use of force. The Law Society Journal noted that striking Iran during active negotiations was against the principles of good faith outlined in Article 2(2) of the UN Charter.

US President Trump had threatened to destroy all the bridges and power plants in Iran and said the country will be brought "back to the Stone Ages, where they belong," if it did not agree to a deal to end the war or reopen the Strait of Hormuz. According to legal scholar Tom Dannenbaum at Stanford Law School, Robert Goldman, a war crimes expert at the American University Washington College of Law, and Sarah Yager, the Washington director of Human Rights Watch, targeting Iranian infrastructure, including power plants, would violate international law if it causes harm to civilians that is excessive in relation to the anticipated military advantage. Although immediate prosecution of Trump administration officials for alleged war crimes is unlikely (similar to Benjamin Netanyahu over the Gaza war), such prosecutions in principle can be brought by any country exercising universal jurisdiction at any time in the future. Luis Moreno Ocampo, the founding chief prosecutor of the ICC, argued that threats by Donald Trump to destroy Iranian infrastructure, alongside mutual attacks on energy infrastructure by Iran and Israel, do not constitute legitimate military targets under international humanitarian law and are war crimes under the Rome Statute. Ocampo likened these actions to the Russian attacks on Ukrainian energy infrastructure that led to ICC indictments. Stephen J. Rapp, former US ambassador-at-large for war crimes issues, said that such conduct risks making the US a rogue state. He and two other international law experts interviewed by NBC News said that Trump's threats alone could potentially constitute a war crime.

More than 100 international law experts signed an open letter in Just Security expressing "profound concern" over "serious violations of international law", namely:

- violation of the UN Charter by attacking Iran
- violations of international humanitarian law by targeting political leaders with no military role, oil and gas infrastructure (including attack on South Pars), and water desalination plants (e.g. in Iran and Bahrain)
- rhetoric and threats from officials, including the threat of denial of quarter by Secretary of Defense Pete Hegseth, dismissal of rules of engagement and international law by Trump and Hegseth, and threats on energy infrastructure by Trump administration.
- the US Defense Department's systematic weakening of the protections meant to ensure compliance with international humanitarian law, including removing senior military lawyers and replacing military judge advocates general, undermining legal oversight of combat operations, as well as abolishing mechanisms designed to limit harm to civilians.

==== Legality of Iranian response ====
According to The Guardian, under international law, Iran has the right to attack US and Israeli military targets following their attacks on Iran; however, Iranian attacks against civilians and against countries not party to the conflict are illegal. The blocking of the strait of Hormuz by Iran was described by Majid Rafizadeh as a violation of the UN Convention on the Law of the Sea (UNCLOS). Neither Iran nor the United States is a party to the treaty. Iran signed but did not ratify the treaty, and asserts its right to regulate the passage of foreign ships through its territorial waters. The United States treats the UNCLOS as "reflective of customary international law" despite not being a signatory. Bertina Kudrin concluded that "International maritime law, despite its many rules, is not equipped for today’s globalized world and chokepoints," due to the tensions between existing regimes of maritime law and complex developments in maritime economics since their implementation.

Hostilities in a chokepoint such as the Strait of Hormuz demonstrate tensions between the governing legal regimes: The transit passage legal regime assumes uninterrupted navigation through international straits, while the law of naval warfare permits interference with shipping during armed conflict. At the same time, the law of self-defense evaluates proportionality in relation to the adversary state, even though disrupting a chokepoint can impose economic costs on dozens of neutral countries that depend on the route.

— Bertina Kudrin, The Strait of Hormuz and the Limits of Maritime Law

The US naval blockade of Iran was described as legitimate under international law of naval warfare by Australian legal expert Donald Rothwell, though the UN specialized agency International Maritime Organization insisted that there is "no legal basis in international law" for such action. Amnesty International declared Iran's recruiting of child soldiers a war crime.

== Effects on Iran ==
=== Iranian military strategy and effectiveness ===
The quicker Iranian response relative to that of the Twelve-Day War suggests a change in Iran's command structure. H. A. Hellyer, a Middle East expert, notes that Iran has moved beyond its initial goal of mere survival. The regime has proven its resilience and has fundamentally altered the strategic importance of the Strait of Hormuz.

According to senior adviser to the UAE president Dr. Anwar Gargash, Iran's strategy intended to undermine the willingness of the Gulf states to support the United States. Iran's targeting of Gulf states may also have been intended to increase energy prices globally, further putting global pressure on the US.

Trita Parsi said on 19 August that Tehran believed it held the military advantage and had begun openly considering taking the offensive rather than just reacting to American attacks. By doing so, he argued, Iran would take control of the war's scope, geography, and timing away from the US.

According to the Associated Press, Iran's attacks on US bases in the Middle East focused on expensive early warning systems in order to clear the way for further attacks on aircraft and buildings, causing billions of dollars in damage to this equipment. According to N.R. Jenzen-Jones, director of Armament Research Services, a technical intelligence firm, this equipment forms the backbone of the US air defense system, and repairing or replacing it is costly and difficult.

Vali Nasr explains that Iran is aggressively escalating tensions to deny Donald Trump the ability to manage or downplay the conflict ahead of the midterm elections. By threatening to expand attacks on U.S. and Gulf targets while bolstering its leadership with hardline figures, Tehran aims to force the U.S. to immediately comply with the terms of the MOU.

According to Ali Vaez, International Crisis Group's Iran Project director, Iran, while preparing for a war it considers as inevitable, is trying to deter the United States from resuming the war by highlighting the costs of a renewed conflict, which Iran says would include cutting undersea internet cables, attacking oil and gas facilities in the region, and targeting AI data centers.

=== Operation Economic Outcast ===
"Economic D-Day," or "Operation Economic Outcast" is a U.S.-led campaign of sanctions and economic isolation launched against Iran in August 2026 amid the ongoing Iran war. Various analysts expressed skepticism regarding the effectiveness of the sanctions and warned of significant global repercussions. Daniel Fried characterized the measures as neither an "economic death blow" nor a game changer, while Andrew L. Peek argued that their impact would be limited by Iran’s ability to evade maritime oil restrictions and source funds through neighbors. The announcement coincided with the Iranian rial hitting a record low, with the rial dropping to 2.05 million to the US dollar on the open market as trading began, compared with an official central bank rate of around 1.5 million rial to the dollar. Days earlier, the United Arab Emirates had announced it was suspending all trade with Iran, one of Iran's largest trading partners and biggest sources of imports.

Jonathan Panikoff further questioned their efficacy, citing the Gulf states' reluctance to isolate Iran, the difficulty of severing China's financial ties to Tehran, and regional doubts about U.S. policy consistency.

Beyond effectiveness, Maia Nikoladze warned that escalating against Chinese financial institutions could trigger Chinese retaliation in critical minerals, a sentiment echoed by Kenneth Rogoff, who noted that sanctions might accelerate dedollarization and prompt China to leverage its control over rare earths and pharmaceuticals. Lesley Chavkin aligned with Rogoff, observing that such measures could drive trade toward non-dollar financial channels that remain inaccessible to the United States. Nasser Hadian, a University of Tehran professor, believes that Iranian leaders won't tolerate the current conditions forever, arguing that a tighter blockade would increase the likelihood of war.

=== Strait of Hormuz ===
The war unexpectedly showed Iran's most important tool is neither its missile program nor its nuclear program, but the ability to disrupt the Strait of Hormuz, which quickly put pressure on US and its allies. Ali Vaez stated, "In the attempt to try to prevent Iran from developing a weapon of mass destruction, the US handed Iran a weapon of mass disruption" in the form of weaponized control over the Strait of Hormuz. According to Frank Gardner, Iran has effectively "broken out of its box".

According to analysis by maritime security sources and UKMTO reports, as well as disclosures by two senior Iranian officials to Reuters, Iran is deploying new tactics and expanding operations beyond the Strait of Hormuz to keep oil prices high and influence US midterm election.

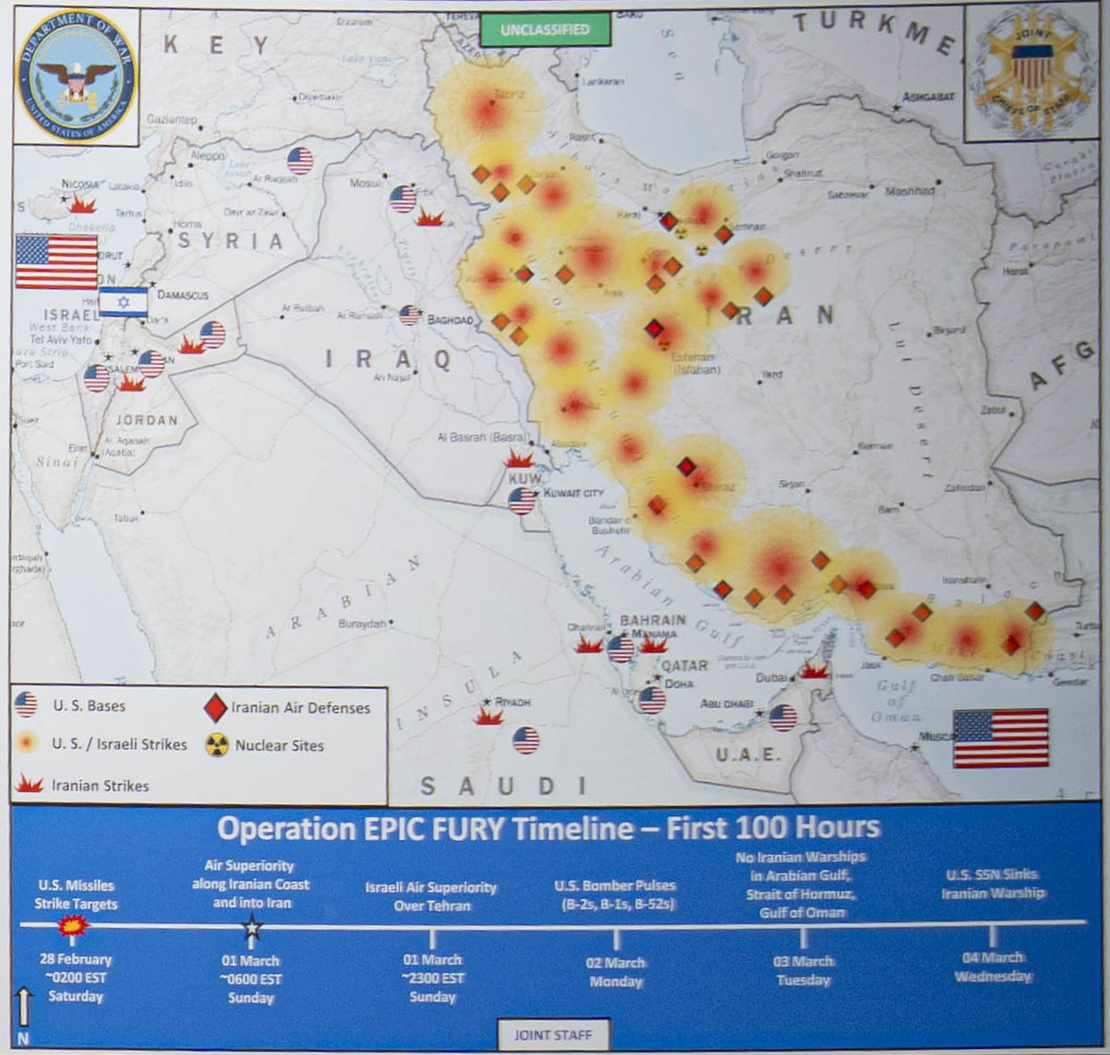
A map titled "Operation Epic Fury Timeline – First 100 Hours" used during press briefing at the Pentagon on 4 March 2026

=== Yemeni Leverage ===
According to Gregory Brew, a senior analyst at Eurasia Group, the Houthis' success in Yemen has shifted the balance of power back in Iran's favor. Iran has managed to alter the status quo without triggering a full-scale war, which its leadership likely wants to avoid for now.

=== Internal Iranian politics ===
On 17 April 2026, Abdullah Mohtadi of the Komala Party of Iranian Kurdistan viewed the Islamic Republic as having been "[in]sufficiently weakened" by the war for Iranian Kurdish groups to take action towards their goal of federalism in Iran, which, according to Mohtadi, they see as necessary for democratisation.

=== Iranian civilians ===
Although the US President Trump started the war with a promise to help free the Iranians from the regime, nearly five months later, the US forces have started targeting the civilian infrastructure those same people depend on.

=== Task Force Iron Gate ===
Analysts believe that the small "Task Force Iron Gate" won't be able to close Iran's borders without regional cooperation. Andreas Krieg, a defense studies professor at King's College London, describes Task Force Iron Gate as a "desperate attempt" to extend Iran's blockade without sending forces to the region. Rami Khouri, a fellow at the American American University of Beirut, sees the mission as impossible because of Iran's position in Asia and its deep ties with its neighbors. Mahjoob Zweiri, a professor at Qatar University, views the mission as symbolic, as Iran's northern neighbors won't cooperate because they don't want to irritate Russia.

== Effects on the United States ==
=== American negotiating strategy and effectiveness ===
During the 2026 Iran war ceasefire, analyst Trita Parsi argued that Trump had become increasingly desperate for a deal with Iran to the point of even denying ceasefire violations by Iran to maintain it. Furthermore, he suggested that Trump was looking for a "silver bullet" instead of serious negotiations with Iranian leaders. Allison Minor, director of the Project for Middle East Integration at the Atlantic Council, argues that to end the war, President Trump must learn to "lose well" by reframing victory rather than pursuing an impossible unconditional surrender from Iran. She tells DW that this shift requires the U.S. to accept painful short-term concessions to secure its long-term interests. According to The Guardian's diplomatic editor, Patrick Wintour, Tehran has crafted a long-term negotiating strategy meant to trap Donald Trump in the Iran conflict through the midterms, hoping to replicate the 1979 hostage crisis and inflict the same ruinous blow on his presidency that destroyed Jimmy Carter's. Ali Vaez, deputy program director for the Middle East and North Africa at the International Crisis Group, warned that if the expired memorandum of understanding is not revived, the standoff between the United States and Iran could spiral into a "forever war", adding that Washington's economic pressure would only harden Tehran’s position. Saeed Laylaz, an Iranian analyst, argues that by dragging out the negotiations, Iran is exerting influence on the U.S. midterm elections without violating any laws; however, reaching a lasting agreement is no longer possible because of the deepening distrust. Regarding restarting attacks on Iran after the US midterm elections, Harrison Mann, a former DIA Middle East/Africa Regional Center executive officer, argues that such offensives which previously reduced U.S. interceptor missile stockpiles and increased the costs of energy worldwide, probably won’t force Tehran to compromise, but instead would lead Iranian leaders, who believe they have the upper hand, to push for more concessions from the Trump administration.

=== American geopolitical status ===
Several articles starting from April onward have argued that the 2026 Iran war has weakened the United States' reputation and geopolitical status, resulting in American decline. The Conversation listed several reasons for why the United States has been in a weakened position, namely loss of influence in the Middle East, limiting its geopolitical involvement in other regions, the massive economic crisis from the 2026 Strait of Hormuz crisis, and the rupture of the world order leading to loss of American global power. In the opinions column of The New York Times, journalist Christopher Caldwell stated that the war had "turned into a watershed in the decline of the American empire" because of its overextension. He argued that while the so-called "Donroe Doctrine", practiced in execution by the 2026 United States intervention in Venezuela, the Greenland crisis, and the 2026 Cuban crisis, was a "logical, even an admirable, foreign policy plan", the Iran war was illogical because it was not "defensive" for foreign policy purposes and became another trap as another "Middle Eastern military misadventure". The Nation wrote that this consensus was becoming more common outside of pro-Trump partisan circles of "knee-jerk loyalty". The Salt Lake Tribune criticized Trump for his exaggerations of Iranian missiles and nuclear weapons being able to hit Americans and for initially predicting a quick victory where Iran would surrender and change their leadership. The article further lambasted him for his war drastically increasing gas prices and for contradicting demands including by repeatedly backing down in a "TACO" (Trump always chickens out) process. Neoconservative scholar Robert Kagan in The Atlantic wrote that the United States had suffered a "total defeat" that was unprecedented in its history as a result of its war in Iran, arguing that there was no way for it to return to the status quo ante and no way to an "American triumph" for it. He suggested that Iran would have no interest in reopening the Strait of Hormuz and that Trump was too unreliable an actor given how he previously boasted of a surprise attack like the 1941 Attack on Pearl Harbor. As a result, he continued, the war helped accelerate the world into an increasingly post-American world order, where the United States' "once-dominant position in the Gulf" will have been the first to have been lost.

The historian Alfred W. McCoy described the war as another "micro-military disaster" that accelerated the destruction of successive empires over the past 2,500 years.

=== American military strategy and effectiveness ===
Analysts argued that deliberate reductions to US intelligence capacity in the period preceding the conflict had created structural limitations on American operational effectiveness, with the rescue of the downed F-15E crew exposing the extent to which institutional erosion was constraining strategic outcomes across multiple theatres. The Atlantic noted the diplomatic strain between Trump and European NATO member nations, as Trump had previously not consulted them regarding the entrance to war against Iran and had since lashed out at them for not joining the war campaign against it.

The Sunday Guardian referred to Trump as "coward-in-chief" for failing to use his massive military advantage to fully defeat the Islamic Republic, thus making it appear as if the US is losing against Iran despite the technical stalemate. The New York Times opinion columnist Thomas L. Friedman wrote that the Iran war demonstrated that Trump had acted less as commander-in-chief and more as "commander-in-thief". He argued that by alienating Democrats and prioritizing an Anti-Weaponization Fund as part of Trump v. Internal Revenue Service to the point of condemnation by some Republicans, Trump had failed to unite his country to war against Iran. Furthermore, he continued, Trump had also alienated traditional allies of the US from the war by emphasizing expansionism against them, creating economic pressure against them, and not consulting NATO allies on the war beforehand.

Former UK adviser Peter Ricketts argues that airstrikes cannot force Iran to yield to US demands. Tehran maintains significant leverage because it can endure military strikes and retaliate by closing the Strait of Hormuz, creating massive economic consequences for the United States.

The Iran war offered China, Russia and North Korea a rare opportunity to learn about certain new American weapons and tactics in combat, as well as how quickly the U.S. depleted its long-range Tomahawk missiles and Patriot interceptors.

According to an October 2026 report by The Intercept, Iran launched attacks on more than 15 U.S. military bases across the Middle East during the 2026 war. The report, quoting an unnamed U.S. official, noted that damage to some of these bases was severe enough that "base posture in the region may never recover." Nawaf Obaid, a senior fellow at King's College London, believes that different factors led Trump to postpone further assaults against Iran, including Iran's ability to predict US attacks and its capacity to retaliate precisely, which could be the result of Russian intelligence-sharing with Iran.

=== Role of lobbies and think tanks ===
Foreign Policy argued that the Israel lobby in the United States held a lot of responsibility for the Iran war because of its influence in degrading relations between the United States and Iran to the point of full hostility and because it enabled Israeli aggression in the region under Israeli prime minister Benjamin Netanyahu. The Forward pointed out that Israeli influence on the United States government and that of pro-Israel lobbying group AIPAC (American Israel Public Affairs Committee) had considerable influence on American foreign policy, especially leading to the Iran war of 2026. Jacobin accused AIPAC of influencing US Congress representatives in voting against measures to block further US military action on Iran under Trump. The Economist observed further American public backlash against pro-Israel lobbying like from AIPAC as a result of the 2026 war, previously accelerated by the Gaza war beginning in 2023.

The Quincy Institute for Responsible Statecraft blamed neoconservative and pro-Israel think tanks for promoting warfare against Iran months before the 2026 war began, suggesting that they held the same level of responsibility for pushing for the Iraq War that began in 2003. Al Jazeera pointed out that the neoconservative think tank Foundation for Defense of Democracies, which includes networks of former Israeli military and intelligence officials, held heavy influence over the Trump administration's hostility towards Iran, thus setting up confrontation towards the Iran war.

=== Trump and Republican party ===
Vali Nasr argues that Iran is deliberately escalating tensions to prevent Donald Trump from controlling or minimizing the conflict before the midterm elections. According to Iran analyst Farzan Sabet of the Geneva Graduate Institute, Iran is likely to escalate militarily—while avoiding full-scale war—in hopes of raising global oil prices or closing the Strait of Hormuz, betting that an unpopular conflict ahead of the U.S. midterm elections could harm President Trump and the Republican Party. According to an NPR analyst, the repercussions of a war with Iran have been negative for Republicans in the 2026 midterm elections, prompting a number of the party's candidates to distance themselves from Trump's policies—a move reflecting the party's concern about losing its majority in the House of Representatives and even its standing in the Senate. According to Jonathan Guyer, the Institute for Global Affairs (IGA) program director, Americans do not care much about foreign policy but now the "foreign policy is the economy," referring to increased costs of the war with Iran, which Democratic nominees use to criticize their Republican rivals who support Trump's war on Iran.

The Atlantic argued that Republican House speaker Mike Johnson shut down efforts for congressional approval votes for the war in Iran to avoid rebukes against Trump, fitting his wider pattern of ceding legislative power to the US president. As a result of such efforts, the author, said, Johnson's legacy was of dismantling the independence of the legislative branch and preventing his colleagues from keeping the president in check.

Dr. Shira Efron, a senior researcher at RAND, believes that Trump's defeat in the midterm elections, which is attributed to his conduct in the war with Iran, may lead him to launch another attack before the new Congress begins its session or, because of the unpopularity of the war among Americans, including Republicans, to search for a way out of the crisis. In either case, Efron argues, Trump would portray new strikes as the "final, decisive blow." According to William F. Wechsler, a senior Atlantic Council official and former Pentagon counterterrorism policy official, Trump may continue the war to avoid being remembered in history as a loser, which may lead him to launch a new, extended war in the coming months.

== Effects on other states ==
=== China ===
The war has been described as having various benefits and drawbacks for Chinese geopolitical interests. The BBC reported that the closure of the Strait of Hormuz and the war in Iran may weaken Chinese interests in countries that rely on Gulf countries' oil. US aggression in Iran played into Chinese rhetoric that frames China as "a pillar of stability in contrast to an unpredictable America." Analysts noted that China has interests both in Iran and in the Gulf states, and that Gulf states may seek closer ties with China after facing attacks from Iran because of their US-alignment. However, analysts also pointed to the loss of discounted sanctioned oil and the inflationary impact of oil scarcity as potential economic drawbacks to the war. Ashok Swain suggested that Trump's coercive diplomacy and expansionist actions against Iran would erode American power due to overstretching its resources in favor of China.

The Diplomat argued that the United States, rather than China as US foreign policy analysts initially framed, became the revisionist power of the 2020s undermining international law and world peace, as evident by the former having started "an unprovoked war against Iran for reasons no one in the Trump administration seems to know" among many other imperialist and expansionist actions.

Zhao Long, director of the Institute for Strategic and International Security Studies at the Shanghai Institute for International Studies, said after unveiling the "Operation Economic Outcast" against Iran that China is unlikely to accept Washington dictating its companies' trade with third countries or becoming a tool for the US's maximum pressure strategy.

=== Israel ===
Based on the Israeli political landscape and enthusiasm for the war, Daniel Levy wrote on 30 March that its interests may be opposed to all who are seeking an end to the war. He said the Lebanon theatre of war was another campaign with no clear endgame. He concluded that "Israel will continue to encourage and provoke escalation and to undermine any negotiation or ceasefire talks, including nudging the US towards ground operations." He said Israel's actions accelerate US global decline.

=== Russia ===
The Washington Institute said that the war had been a setback for Russian influence in the region. However, they also noted that it may distract the United States from the war in Ukraine.

=== Iraq ===
With the withdrawal of U.S. military forces from Iraq, the Kurdistan Region faces a security vacuum and a weakened political standing, paving the way for Tehran to expand its strategic influence. Hesam Dastpish, a Brussels-based analyst, argues that the primary threat to the region is not a full-scale military invasion, but rather a slow, calculated erosion of its autonomy. In this context, Kasra Qaredaghi, a U.S.-based political science researcher, emphasizes that with the loss of U.S. protection, Iranian Kurdish opposition groups stationed in the Kurdistan Region are now in their most vulnerable state, leaving Erbil with virtually no leverage to counter Tehran's escalating pressure to disarm these groups and extract political concessions.

== Geopolitical implications ==
=== American expansionism ===
Numerous critics and analysts identified the US-Israeli attack as a more open embrace of expansionism and imperialism by the Trump administration. Similarly, Israel's confrontation with Iran and occupation of Lebanese territory and resources has been considered to be territorial and influential expansionism, especially in relation to the "Greater Israel" ideology. The US–Israeli attack is widely considered a "war of choice". According to the founding chief prosecutor of the International Criminal Court (ICC) Luis Moreno Ocampo, the US war on Iran is comparable to Russia's war in Ukraine, adding that the world is going from the "rules-based system" to the "rule of the man", which is "not a viable world". A number of US and Israeli officials, including Hegseth, have made religious justifications for the war.

President Trump addresses the nation assuring that the military activity in the Middle East was "nearing completion", 1 April.

Gilbert Achcar said that the US was practicing a modernized version of gunboat diplomacy. Gokay and Hamourtziadou connected the attack on Iran with a longstanding pattern of US interventions in the region. They also connected the attack on Iran in the midst of negotiations to the history of United States treaty-breaking during westward expansion. Saeed Shah wrote that many in the Global South do not view the war as having the moral purpose that the US and many of its allies asserted, and that they instead see the war as a failure of diplomacy, and an act of aggression against a weaker nation. International relations experts said that the erosion of international law was making nations in the Global South feel insecure, and more likely to support a coalition against US interests.

=== Nuclear proliferation ===
An analyst at Eagle Intelligence Reports argued that the strikes reinforced North Korea's nuclear deterrence calculus, with Pyongyang interpreting the military action against a non-nuclear Iran as strategic validation of its own weapons programme as essential to regime survival, and that the conflict would accelerate North Korean nuclear expansion while making denuclearisation talks "almost unimaginable in the foreseeable future".

The war took place while non-proliferation of nuclear weapons was "already under significant strain." In February 2026, New START expired. Additionally, as "lessons of the Cold War and the devastating consequences of nuclear weapons fade from living memory", public support to possess nuclear weapons has reportedly risen in several countries. The war along with the histories of other countries which have given up their ambitions for nuclear weapons or the weapons themselves such as Iraq, Libya and Ukraine may also incentivize nuclear proliferation.

== Comparisons to other conflicts ==
=== Suez crisis ===
Multiple sources compared the closure of the Strait to the Suez Crisis, suggesting that it would similarly result in a strategic failure for the US.

=== Vietnam War ===
Foreign Policy considered the Iran war to be a major defeat for the US, one that was far bigger than that in the Vietnam War. The author wrote that while the Iran war looked like a typical US defeat in other conflicts, Trump's loss marked an unambiguously weaker US geopolitical position with its strategic objectives being weakened. Howard W. French, the American journalist, also draws parallels between the Iran war and the Vietnam War, invoking the George Santayana aphorism "Those who cannot remember the past are condemned to repeat it." Admiral James G. Stavridis noted that while Iran "doesn’t have a great hand of cards ... they're playing it pretty well," using a war of attrition strategy—similar to the North Vietnamese—to try and force the U.S. to walk away.

=== Iran hostage crisis ===
The Conversation suggested that similar to the 1979 to 1981 Iran hostage crisis that humiliated the US and drastically weakened president Jimmy Carter's reelection chances for the 1980 United States presidential election, Iran may have been employing similar methods of stalling the war to weaken president Donald Trump ahead of the 2026 United States elections. Middle East analyst Aaron David Miller, a senior fellow at the Carnegie Endowment for International Peace, argued that Trump was trapped in the conflict because his objectives regarding the Gulf region and the Strait of Hormuz were holding him hostage. He continued that just as Iran had once damaged Carter's reputation, Trump's was set on the same path.

=== Iran–Iraq War ===
ThePrint compared the 2026 Iran war to the Iran–Iraq War, suggesting that both Donald Trump and Iraqi president Saddam Hussein lured themselves into believing that they achieve easy victories against Iran in warfare but found themselves stuck in quagmires as a result.

=== Iraq War ===
Financial Times recalled the "you break it, you buy it" rule used previously during the Iraq War, where the US has caused the 2026 Strait of Hormuz crisis that threatened to overturn the global oil supply and hence "owned" that problem. Contrasting the European responses to the Iran and Iraq wars, Serge Halimi and Pierre Rimbert wrote that "[European] governments that once vehemently opposed the war in Iraq now limit themselves to muted protest."

=== Russo-Ukrainian War ===
The Guardian wrote that both Russian president Vladimir Putin and Donald Trump had gotten themselves trapped in their wars of choice because neither had been able to resolve their respective conflicts in their favors. They continued that both presidents had long built their "authoritarian strongmen" images but, as a result, surrounded themselves with sycophants who refused to push back against their respective leaders.

== See also ==
- 2025–2026 Iranian protests
- Geneva Conventions
- Philosophy of war
