= Richard Reeve Baxter =

American jurist (1921–1980)

Richard Baxter

Judge of the International Court of Justice
- In office 1979–1980
- Preceded by: Hardy Cross Dillard
- Succeeded by: Stephen Schwebel

Personal details
- Born: Richard Reeve Baxter; February 14, 1921 New York City, New York, U.S.
- Died: September 25, 1980 (aged 59) Cambridge, England, UK
- Spouse: Harriet Baxter
- Education: Brown University (BA); Harvard University (LLB)

Richard Reeve Baxter (14 February 1921 – 25 September 1980) was an American jurist and from 1950 until his death the preeminent figure on the law of war. Baxter served as a judge on the International Court of Justice (1979–1980), as a professor of law at Harvard University (1954 - 1979) and as an enlisted man and officer in the U.S. Army (1942–46,1948–54). He is noted for consistently favoring moves that enhanced the protections afforded to those injured or threatened by armed conflict. Baxter authored the 1956 revision of the U.S. Army Manual on the Law of Land Warfare (FM27-10 ) and was a leading representative of the U.S. at the Geneva conferences that concluded the Protocols to the Geneva Conventions on the Laws of War. Baxter was also the preeminent scholar on the law of international waterways at the time of his death. He died of cancer one year into his term as a judge of the International Court of Justice.

== Early life and academic career ==
Richard Reeve Baxter was born in New York City and graduated from Brown University in 1942. After university, Baxter joined the U.S. Army and enlisted until the end of World War II. He then entered the Harvard School of Law and rejoined the U.S. Army after graduating from the law school in 1948. In 1950 the army sent Baxter (then Captain) to work for a year with Professor Sir Hersch Lauterpacht, the Whewell Professor of International Law at Cambridge University and, at the time, the world's leading international legal scholar. Lauterpacht became a patron of Baxter's and was instrumental in Baxter leaving the Army in 1954 for a teaching position at Harvard Law School. At the time of his resignation from the U.S. Army, Baxter was awarded the Legion of Merit and held the position of Chief of the International Law Branch – Office of the Judge Advocate General. Baxter was later appointed as a full professor of law and the first holder of the Manley O Hudson Chair of International Law. Baxter's research at Harvard concerned the legal regime of interoceanic canals with an emphasis on the Panama and Suez. He became the leading scholar in the area of law concerning international waterways, and his advice was actively sought by the Pentagon and State Department during the Suez Crisis. Baxter's research was published as the monograph, The Law of International Waterways and is considered the definitive work on the subject and a classic in its field. In the latter part of his twenty years of teaching at Harvard Law School, he devoted a great deal of time and effort to the writing, together with Professor Louis B. Sohn, of a study on State responsibility for the U.N. International Law Commission.

== International Court of Justice ==
In 1978 U.S. President Jimmy Carter informed the U.S. National Group at the Permanent Court of Arbitration that he desired former Supreme Court Justice Arthur Goldberg selected as the nominee to the International Court of Justice. However, Baxter's nomination for the 1978 election to the ICJ was universally supported in the international law community and, as a result, the US national group at the Permanent Court of Arbitration did not honor President Carter's request. The group nominated Baxter, and he was subsequently elected to the Court by the U.N. General Assembly and U.N. Security Council. Before falling terminally ill, Baxter was able to take part in the case, The U.S. Diplomatic and Consular Staff in Tehran. Several of Baxter's fellow judges commented on his well-reasoned and objective analysis during deliberations of the case.

== International Court of Justice ruling ==
Case	ICJ Category	Parties	Challenger	Defendant	Court Favored	Opinion	Appendment
U.S. Diplomatic and Consular Staff in Tehran	Contentious	USA vs. Iran	USA	Iran	USA	majority	none

== Baxter and the law of war ==
=== Contribution to Rules of Land Warfare ===
Baxter participated in a British–United States conference in 1953 focusing on the amendment of both the British Manual of Military Law and the United States'Rules of Land Warfare. Amendments needed to the British and American manuals were made necessary by the adoption of the Geneva Conventions of 1949 and the great development in the jurisprudence of the law of war which took place as a result of World War II and Korean War. In 1956, Baxter authored the complete revision to the Rules of Land Warfare. The 1956 version guided many American military officers over the years and remains the basic text.

=== Impact of weapons on non-combatants ===
A large part of Baxter's work addressed the need to protect non-combatant civilians from death and injury during conflicts. As a result, Baxter took a strong interest in old and new weaponry and how weapons could be controlled to minimize injury to non-combatants. He wrote about nuclear warfare and addressed the use of poison gas during World War I. He also wrote extensively about the 1925 Geneva Convention that outlawed the use of gas in armed conflict and stridently urged Congress to ratify the Geneva Protocol on Chemical and Biological Warfare. Baxter's writings also addressed the devastation of civilian homelands during World War II, in particular, through area bombing.

=== Protocols to Geneva Conventions ===
Baxter's writings on the impact of aerial bombings on non-combatants was an impetus for the U.N. General Assembly to add additional humanitarian conventions needed to protect civilians from death and injury during armed conflicts. In 1969, Baxter represented the U.S. at the conference of government experts held before the Geneva diplomatic conferences. Assisting Baxter was Waldemar A. Solf, chief of the international affairs division at the Office of the Judge Advocate General of the Army and the person who became Baxter's functional successor as the Department of the Army's doctrinal authority on the laws of war. These meetings resulted in two draft Protocols to the Geneva Conventions of 1949:

1. Draft of Protocol 1 – Additional Protocol to the Geneva Conventions of Aug. 12, 1949, Relating to the Protection of Victims of International Armed Conflicts
2. Draft of Protocol 2 – Additional Protocol to the Geneva Conventions of Aug. 12, 1949 and Relating to the Protection of Victims of Non International Armed Conflicts.

The Geneva Diplomatic Conferences met in four sessions between 1974 and 1977. Along with the U.S. State Dept. Legal Adviser and seven senior staff officers from the Department of Defense, Baxter participated actively in the negotiations. Although the United States did not ratify the Protocols, it has regarded important portions of them as representing customary international law binding on all nations. As a result, Air Force operations during the Gulf and Iraq Wars were carefully planned and monitored to minimize civilian losses.

== Contribution to the American Society of International Law ==
As a member of the American Society of International Law and later as president, Baxter had a significant impact on the propagation of interest in the field of international law. It was Baxter's suggestion to organize a student branch of the society which led to the creation of the Association of Student International Law Societies and proliferation of student interest in international law, which was manifested in scores of new law journals and societies in law schools throughout the United States. It was also Baxter's idea for the Society to sponsor the international moot court competition, which he recommended be named in honor of Philip Jessup The Phillip Jessup Moot Court Competition has grown considerably since its inception and involves students from law schools worldwide. Baxter was also one of the founders of the publication International Legal Materials that has been published every month since 1962 and provides a source of important treaties, judicial and arbitral decisions, national legislation, international organizations resolutions and other documents for scholar, practitioners, business and government officials.

== Tributes ==
- He was that rare teacher whose former students became lifelong friends and colleagues and cared deeply about them and their professional development long after they ceased to be his students, formally at least. – Thomas Buergenthal
- I am persuaded that the essential qualities were all apparent from what I saw on our first encounter in 1953. Competence and intelligence, informed by thorough scholarship; devotion to the cause of international law; a strong element of common sense and practicality in seeking to promote international law; a strong moral force; prodigious capacity for hard work, creative work as well as what he called donkey work, wit and humor in observing the human scene; compassion, tact, and kindness in dealing with other laborers in the same field; and, finally, a talent for friendship. All these qualities were integrated in Dick (Richard) Baxter in harmonious combination. – Monroe Leigh
- He worked like a jovial demon. As the manuscript merited, his comments on prospective manuscripts were detailed and constructive, or dispositive. Many authors might have listed him as a co-author, and his suggestions were extensive and excellent. The meetings of the board of editors of the Journal,(The American Journal of International Law) under his cheery chairmanship, were a delight. He would annually distribute, among other items, a list of articles he had not deemed worthy of submission to other editors for analysis but had rejected on his authority; he disposed of a hundred or more each year, in addition to all of his other work. Each entry was accompanied by a pithy dispositive comment worthy of The New Yorker magazine. This list was destroyed at the meeting to avoid embarrassing those whose submissions had been rejected-an act typical of the consideration for the feelings of others with which Baxter acted. – Stephen Schwebel
- He was just the right person to be an international judge: he knew the law; he understood people; he was endowed with balance and restraint; his writing could make the absorption of complex and even dull material simple and pleasurable. – Elihu Lauterpacht
- His extraordinary ability to listen sympathetically to everyone's point of view and incorporate these in imaginative draft proposals was widely admired and respected. Perhaps more important was his remarkable ingenuity in reducing these often conflicting texts to one or two. We participants, and indeed the law itself, benefited enormously from his presence. - David M. Miller

== Ribbon bar ==

1st Row	Legion of Merit		Bronze Star
2nd Row	Army Good Conduct Medal	Pacific Campaign Medal	American Defense Service Medal
3rd Row	World War II Victory Medal	Army of Occupation Medal	Korean Service Medal

== Selected works ==
1. The Law of War, "The Present State of International law and Other Essays: Written in Honour of the Centenary Celebration of the International Law Association 1873- 1973", pp. 107–124.
2. The Duty of Obedience to the Belligerent Occupant, "The British Year Book of International Law", Vol.27, 190, pp. 235–266.
3. So-Called 'Unprivileged Belligerency': Spies, Guerrillas, and Saboteurs', "The British Year Book of International Law", Vol. 28, 1951, pp. 323–345.
4. The Municipal and International Law Basis of Jurisdiction Over War Crimes, "The British Yearbook of International Law", Vol. 28, 1951, pp. 382–393.
5. Constitutional Forms and Some Legal Problems of International Military Command, "The British Year book of International Law", Vol. 29, 1952, pp. 325–359.
6. The Geneva Conventions of 1949, "Naval War College Review", Vol. VIII NO.5, January 1956, pp. 59–82.
7. The First Modern Codification of the Law of War: Francis Lieber and General Order No. 100, "International Review of the Red Cross", Vol.3, No. 26, May 1963, pp. 234–250.
8. Legal Aspects of the Geneva Protocol of 1925 (with Thomas Buergenthal), "The American Journal of International Law", Vol. 64, 1970, pp. 853–879.
9. The Law of War in the Arab-Israeli Conflict: On Water and on Land, "Towson State Journal of International Affairs", Vol. VI, No.1, Fall 1971, pp. 1–15.
10. A Skeptical Look at the Concept of Terrorism, "Akron Law Review", Vol. VI, No.1, Fall 1971, pp. 1–15.
11. Perspective – The Evolving Laws of armed Conflicts, "Military Law Review", Vol. 60, 1973, pp. 99–111. Department of the Army Pamphlet 27–100–60, p. 99
12. 'Ius in Bello Interno:' The Present and Future Law, "Law & Civil War in the Modern World", Edited by John Norton Moore, Baltimore: The Johns Hopkins University Press, 1974, pp. 518–536.
13. The Geneva Conventions of 1949 and Wars of National Liberation, "International Terrorism and Political Crimes", Edited by: M. Cherif Bassiouni, New York: Thomas Publishing, 1975, pp. 120–132.
14. Humanitarian Law or Humanitarian Politics? The 1974 Diplomatic Conference on Humanitarian Law, "Harvard International Law Journal", Vol. 16, 1975, pp. 1–26.
15. Armistices and Other Forms of Suspension of Hostilities, "Collected Courses of Hague Academy of International Law", Vol. 149, 1976, pp. 355–398.
16. Human Rights in War, "Bulletin of the American Academy of Arts and Sciences, Vol. 31, No. 2 (Nov., 1977), pp. 4-13.
17. Modernizing the Law of War, "Military Law Review" Vol. 78, 1977, pp. 165–183
18. Legal Aspects of Arms Control Measures Concerning the Missile Carrying Submarines and Anti-Submarine Warfare, "The Future of the Sea-Based Deterrent", Cambridge, MA: The MIT Press, 1974, pp. 213–232.
19. Forces for Compliance with the Law of War, "Proceedings of the American Society of International Law at Its Annual Meeting (1921-1969), Vol. 58, "Causing compliance with International Law", April 23–25, 1964, pp. 82–99.

== Positions ==
- 1952–1954, Chief of International Law Branch, U.S. Army Judge Advocate General
- 1953–1980, Lecturer Naval War College
- 1954–1979, Professor of Law – Harvard Law School
- 1966–1967, Professor of Law – Cambridge University (visiting)
- 1970–1978, Editor in Chief – American Journal of Law
- 1971–1972, Counselor of Intl. Law, U.S. Department of State
- 1974–1976, President of American Society of International Law
- 1979–1980, Judge, International Court of Justice

== Associations ==
- Indian Society of International Law (honorary)
- Permanent Court of Arbitration, U.S. National Group
- Council on Foreign Relations
- American Academy of Arts & Sciences
- Massachusetts Bar

== Awards ==
- Manley O Hudson Medal
- Guggenheim Fellow, 1966
