= Stephen M. Schwebel =

American judge (1929–2026)

Stephen Schwebel
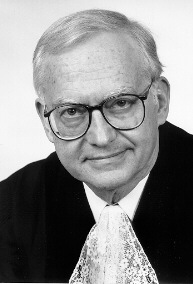

President of the International Court of Justice
- In office 1997–2000
- Preceded by: Mohammed Bedjaoui
- Succeeded by: Gilbert Guillaume

Vice President of the International Court of Justice
- In office 1994–1997
- Preceded by: Shigeru Oda
- Succeeded by: Christopher Weeramantry

Judge of the International Court of Justice
- In office 1981–2000
- Preceded by: Richard Baxter
- Succeeded by: Thomas Buergenthal

Personal details
- Born: Stephen Myron Schwebel; March 10, 1929 New York City, U.S.
- Died: April 9, 2026 (aged 97)
- Education: Harvard University (BA); University of Cambridge; Yale University (LLB)

Stephen Myron Schwebel (March 10, 1929 – April 9, 2026) was an American jurist and international judge, counsel and arbitrator. He previously served as judge of the World Bank Administrative Tribunal (2010–2017), as a member of the U.S. National Group at the Permanent Court of Arbitration, as president of the International Monetary Fund Administrative Tribunal (1993–2010), as president of the International Court of Justice (1997–2000), as vice president of the International Court of Justice (1994–1997), and as Judge of the International Court of Justice (1981–2000). Prior to his tenure on the ICJ, Schwebel served as deputy legal adviser to the U.S. Department of State (1974–1981) and as assistant legal adviser to the U.S. Department of State (1961–1967). He also served as a professor of law at Harvard Law School (1959–1961) and Johns Hopkins University (1967–1981). Schwebel is noted for his expansive opinions in momentous cases such as Legality of the Threat or Use of Nuclear Weapons, Military and Paramilitary Activities in and Against Nicaragua and Oil Platforms (Islamic Republic of Iran v. United States of America).

== Background ==
Schwebel was born on March 10, 1929, in New York City, and while attending high school in New York City developed a strong interest in the United Nations Conference on International Organization being held in San Francisco. The U.N. Conference and the U.N. student organization that he was active in (and that was later affiliated with the United Nations Association of the United States of America), marked the start of a long focus on international relations and law. After entering Harvard University, he became active in the U.N. student movement and participated in founding The United Nations Council of Harvard. This experience has been presented as the starting point of a career "firmly embedded in the UN firmament and ... devolved into its service, or on legal matters pertaining to it". In 1950 he received a B.A. magna cum laude with highest honors in government from Harvard and was awarded the Frank Knox Memorial Fellowship. The Knox Fellowship enabled Schwebel to perform research and study in a Commonwealth country of his choice. Schwebel chose to study international law at Cambridge University in England under Sir Hersch Lauterpacht who advised him, upon completion of his year at Cambridge, to attend law school. He subsequently entered Yale Law School, where he received an LL.B. (1954). While studying at Yale, Schwebel was told by the eminent professor of law Myres McDougal that in order to become an influential international lawyer he first needed to, "earn his spurs," at the best law firm that would take him.

From 1954 to 1959, Schwebel practiced law as an associate at the law firm of White & Case in New York City. While at White & Case, he had the opportunity to participate in one of the largest international arbitration cases of the 20th century - Saudi Arabia v. Arabian American Oil Company. Schwebel was assigned the "digging" on the case and spent countless hours going through files; however, the experience engendered a lifelong interest in international arbitration. In 1959, he accepted a position as assistant professor of law at Harvard Law School, where he taught until 1961. In 1961 Schwebel started his career with the U.S. State Department as assistant legal adviser on United Nations affairs. In 1967 he returned to academia as the Burling Professor of International Law at Johns Hopkins School of Advanced International Studies.

Schwebel died on April 9, 2026, at the age of 97.

== Deputy legal adviser to U.S. Department of State ==
In 1974, Schwebel became deputy legal adviser to the U.S. Department of State, where he provided legal advice supporting the formulation and implementation of U.S. foreign policy. During his service as deputy legal adviser, he participated as associate representative, representative counsel and deputy agent of the United States in various cases before the International Court of Justice including: Interpretation of the Agreement of 25 March 1951 Between the World Health Organization and Egypt (1980), United States Diplomatic and Consular Staff in Tehran (1979–1980) and, while serving as assistant legal adviser for United Nations affairs, Certain Expenses of the United Nations (1962). Schwebel also served as counselor on international law, special assistant to the assistant secretary of state for international organizational affairs at the Department of State, and U.S. representative to various committees of the United Nations, including the UNCTAD Working Group on a Charter of Economic Rights and Duties of States (1973–1974); the Special Committee on the Question of Defining Aggression (1971); and the Special Committee on Principles of International Law concerning Friendly Relations and Co-operation among States (1964). He was also a member of the United Nations International Law Commission from 1977 to 1980.

=== Cambodian accountability ===
In September 1978, Schwebel, acting as deputy legal adviser to the U.S. Department of State, sought accountability for the mass executions committed by the Khmer Rouge. Schwebel wrote the U.K. Foreign Office about the possibility of instituting proceedings against Cambodia before the International Court of Justice for genocide. Although Schwebel suggested a basis for the proceedings should be the Genocide Convention, he acknowledged that proceedings of a case against Cambodia based on the convention were not well founded. Schwebel stated that the atrocities had apparently not been aimed at destroying, in whole or in part, a "national, ethnical, racial or religious group," as defined by the Genocide Convention, but rather those whom the Cambodian authorities deemed to be politically unsympathetic. The UK concurred with Schwebel's concerns by stating that it felt arguments against instituting proceedings were too strong and that the criterion for the atrocities appeared to be the political attitude (or assumed attitude) by the Cambodian government.

=== Filártiga v. Peña-Irala ===
Schwebel was a key member of the U.S. State Department team that initiated and sought to influence, through an amicus brief, the Second Circuit Court of Appeals in its hearing of the landmark case Filártiga v. Peña-Irala. In August 1979, two months before oral arguments at the Second Circuit, Schwebel, as deputy legal adviser, contacted the Civil Rights Division in the Justice Department and expressed the U.S. State Department's desire for the Justice Department to take account of developments in international law, which firmly established that all natural persons are entitled to fundamental human rights. Schwebel wrote:

The position of the (U.S.) State Department on the question of international law immediately relevant to the District court judgment in Filártiga is that acts of torture violate an individual's rights under international law not to be tortured. That an individual has this right is a conclusion founded on provisions of the U.N. Charter and authoritative interpretations of those provisions, on other treaties, on international custom and practice and on the general principles of law- all as recognized by the U.S. and other nations. It derives also from international and national judicial decisions.

Despite taking over eight months for the U.S. State Department, Solicitor General and Department of Justice to formulate a combined final position in Filártiga v. Peña-Irala, the ruling by the Second Circuit Court of Appeals, that torture is prohibited by international law, was heavily influenced by the amicus briefs initiated by Schwebel and his team at the U.S. State Department.

== International Court of Justice ==
Schwebel was nominated for election to the International Court of Justice by the bipartisan U.S. National Group at the Permanent Court of Arbitration during the presidency of Jimmy Carter. In January 1981, Schwebel was elected by the U.N. Security Council and U.N. General Assembly, along with Fikri El-Khani of Syria, to fill vacancies created by the deaths of Richard R. Baxter (U.S.A.) and Salah El Dne Trazi (Syria). Schwebel was re-elected on February 6, 1988, and re-elected again February 6, 1997. He was elected to vice president of the court from 1994 to 1997 and served as president of the court from 1997 to 2000. During his tenure on the court, Schwebel adjudicated 38 cases. These cases included advisory opinions such as Legality of the Threat or Use of Nuclear Weapons and Difference Relating to Immunity from Legal Process of a Special Rapporteur of the Commission on Human Rights, Oil Platforms (Iran v. United States) and Aerial Incident of 10 August 1999 (Pakistan v. India). His opinions in these cases have been characterized by scholars as expansive, impassioned, exhaustive, closely reasoned and, by those who share his views, brilliant. His ruling in the Legality of Threat or Use of Nuclear Weapons Case is considered by some scholars to be consistent with that of a moderate conservative. Schwebel frequently voted against the majority of his colleagues; however, he also voted against his own country (U.S.) more than any other judge in the history of the court. He believes that a nationalistic view, as opposed to a judicial view, undermines the international system and that the judicial decision-making process must take in to consideration moral considerations relating to equality - beyond just a strict legalist interpretation. He resigned from the Court in January 2000.

=== Case: Legality of the Threat or Use of Nuclear Weapons ===
In January 1995, the U.N. asked the International Court of Justice to render an advisory opinion on whether or not the threat or use of nuclear weapons in any circumstance is permitted under international law. Schwebel was the only judge who answered the question in an affirmative manner. Schwebel holds that the legality of the threat or use of nuclear weapons is established through state practice over many years by the world's major powers, the U.N. Security Council, the U.N. General Assembly, the Nuclear Non Proliferation Treaty and other nuclear treaties. He specifically notes that in The Nuclear Non Proliferation Treaty, the possession of nuclear weapons by the five major nuclear powers is lawful until disarmament and that inherent in possession of nuclear weapons is deterrence, and deterrence, by its nature, implies threat of use.

The policy of deterrence differs from that of the threat to use nuclear weapons by its generality but if a threat of possible use did not inhere in deterrence, deterrence would not deter. If possession by the five nuclear Powers is lawful until achievement of nuclear disarmament; if possession is the better part of deterrence; if deterrence is the better part of threat, then it follows that the practice of States -- including their treaty practice-- does not absolutely debar the threat or use of nuclear weapons.

Schwebel also holds that the principles of international humanitarian law such as proportionality in the degree of force applied, discrimination in the application of force between combatants and civilians and avoidance of unnecessary suffering of combatants, all of which antedate the invention of nuclear weapons, must also apply to nuclear weapons. He acknowledges, however, that it is extremely difficult to apply the principles of international humanitarian law with the practice of employing such destructive weapons; although not doing so, in his view, vitiates international humanitarian law. Schwebel, draws a distinction between the use of nuclear weapons for countervalue, which he believes cannot be reconciled with international humanitarian law, and the tactical use of nuclear weapons against military targets which he believes, in certain circumstances, can.

At one extreme is the use of strategic nuclear weapons in quantities against enemy cities and industries. This so-called "countervalue" (as contrasted with "counterforce" uses directed only against enemy nuclear forces and installations) could cause an enormous number of deaths and injuries, running in some cases into the millions; and, in addition to those immediately affected by the heat and blast of those weapons, vast numbers could be affected, many fatally, by spreading radiation. Large-scale "exchanges" of such nuclear weaponry could destroy not only cities but countries, and render continents, perhaps the whole of the Earth, uninhabitable, if not at once then through longer-range effects of nuclear fallout, it cannot be accepted that the use of nuclear weapons on a scale which would -or could -result in the deaths of many millions in indiscriminate inferno and by far reaching fallout, have profoundly pernicious effects in space and time, and render uninhabitable much or all of the Earth, could be lawful.

Schwebel's view that the use of tactical nuclear weapons, in certain circumstances, complies with international humanitarian law contrasts with members of the court's majority, and other scholars, who believe that a nuclear weapon (of any yield) impacts civilians either directly or by an escalation in hostility that might follow. Schwebel asserts that, in certain circumstances, such as a nuclear depth charge targeted toward an enemy submarine, the antinomy between international humanitarian law and the use of nuclear weapons can be reconciled. He states that a nuclear depth charge targeted toward an enemy submarine does not give rise to immediate civilian casualties, meets the test of proportionality and leaves significantly less radiation in the ocean than the targeted submarine's missiles would leave on land.

Schwebel characterizes the immense antinomy between the principles of international humanitarian law and nuclear weapons as a titanic tension between state practice and legal principle never before seen by the court. He is critical of the court's inability to conclude whether or not the threat or use of nuclear weapons is lawful or unlawful in an extreme circumstance of State self-defense. In Schwebel's view, it is unacceptable that the court rendered a non liquet on such a vital question, despite provisions in Article 38 of the court statute intended to prevent such an outcome. Schwebel expressed his dismay by stating:

This is an astounding conclusion to be reached by the International Court of Justice. Despite the fact that its Statute "forms an integral part" of the United Nations Charter, and despite the comprehensive and categorical terms of Article 2, paragraph 4, and Article 51 of that Charter, the Court concludes on the supreme issue of the threat or use of force of our age that it has no opinion. In "an extreme circumstance of self defense, in which the very survival of a State would be at stake", the Court finds that international law and hence the Court have nothing to say. After many months of agonizing appraisal of the law, the Court discovers that there is none. When it comes to the supreme interests of State, the Court discards the legal progress of the twentieth century, puts aside the provisions of the Charter of the United Nation of which it is "the principal judicial organ", and proclaims in terms redolent of Realpolitik its ambivalence about the most important provisions of modern international law. If this was to be its ultimate holding, the Court would have done better to have drawn on its undoubted discretion not to render an opinion at all.

=== Case: Nicaragua v. United States of America ===
On April 9, 1984 Nicaragua filed a complaint with the International Court of Justice stating that the United States was violating international law by using military force against Nicaragua and intervening in Nicaragua's internal affairs, in violation of its sovereignty, territorial integrity and political independence. The United States argued that the court did not have jurisdiction to hear the case and Schwebel in the first, second and third votes held to determine the court's jurisdiction, agreed; however, on the fourth vote, despite strong admonitions by his own (U.S.) government for dismissal of the application, concurred with his fellow judges that the complaint was admissible and should be heard. Schwebel also agreed with the court that unannounced mining of Nicaragua's ports by the United States was a violation of customary international law. He noted that the unannounced mining had the potential to, and did, affect third party states. Schwebel also found that the United States violated the law of war when the Central Intelligence Agency orchestrated the publication and distribution of a manual titled, Operaciones Sicologicas en Guerra de Guerillas. However, with the exceptions of Judges Shigeru Oda (Japan) and Sir Robert Jennings (UK), he disagreed profoundly with interpretation of what constitutes an armed attack, under international law, by one state on another. The court's majority found that, under international law, the arms provided by Nicaragua to the pro Nicaraguan insurgent group in El Salvador did not constitute an armed attack on the state of El Salvador by Nicaragua and, as a result, the United States did not have a right under article 51 of the U.N. Charter to collective self-defense in support of its ally El Salvador. Schwebel, however, felt that the scale of involvement by Nicaragua crossed a threshold of what, under customary international law, would be considered an armed attack by one state on another. He stated in his dissenting opinion that the court's majority did not thoroughly consider the prodigious evidence that Nicaragua was aggressively supporting the insurgency in El Salvador.

It (the Court) has excluded, discounted and excused the unanswerable evidence of Nicaragua's major and maintained intervention in the Salvadoran insurgency, and intervention which has consisted not only in provision of great quantities of small arms until early 1981, but provision of arms, ammunition, munitions and supplies thereafter and provision of command and control centers, training and communication facilities and other support before and after 1981."

Schwebel viewed the court as not being even handed in its interpretation of evidence and testimony. He felt that the court paid insufficient attention to the rights of both the U.S. and Nicaragua's neighbors. He found that emphasizing the rights of Nicaragua, while the U.S. claimed that Nicaragua was itself behind the guerrilla movement in El Salvador, "was incompatible with the principles of equality of States." Schwebel also notes that the name assigned to the case (Military & Paramilitary Activities in and Against Nicaragua) indicates inherent bias and predetermined judgment. Scholars have written that Schwebel was inhibited, however, in making a case for his view due to the withdrawal of the United States from the proceedings and, as a result, the lack of an advocate in the court to defend U.S. policy and to attack the evidence presented by Nicaragua.

=== Case: Oil Platforms (Islamic Republic of Iran v. United States of America) ===
In Oil Platforms (Islamic Republic of Iran v. United States), Schwebel, acting as vice president of the ICJ, issued a dissenting opinion to the court's 1996 preliminary judgement ruling that it could exercise jurisdiction over the dispute. In the case, Iran challenged the U.S. Navy's destruction of three Iranian oil platforms in the Persian Gulf after an increase in tensions in 1987–1988. The United States filed preliminary objections to the court's jurisdiction and a counter-claim challenging Iran's attacks on vessels in the Persian Gulf. Dissenting from the court's preliminary ruling that it could exercise jurisdiction over the dispute, Schwebel reasoned that the scope of the compromissory clause of the 1955 Treaty of Amity, Economic Relations and Consular Rights between Iran and the United States – the alleged basis for jurisdiction – did not encompass the dispute because the parties did not intend, at the time of signing the Treaty of Amity, for disputes of such a nature to be covered by the clause. He noted that the Treaty's purpose was to promote commerce and navigation between the parties, not to regulate uses of force between the parties.

== Post International Court of Justice career ==
Following the end of his tenure on the International Court of Justice, Schwebel acted as counsel, mediator and independent arbitrator in disputes that involved commercial, corporate and public international law. He was appointed in 67 arbitral proceedings that have included disputes between states and disputes between states and foreign investors. In October 2010, Schwebel was appointed by the UN Secretary-General Ban Ki-moon as the chairman of the Kishanganga/Neelum River Hydro-Electric Project (Pakistan v. India) Arbitration. He also acted as counsel and advocate for Colombia in its territorial and maritime delimitation dispute with Nicaragua and for Belize in its territorial, insular and maritime boundary dispute with Guatemala. In October 2007, Schwebel was appointed to a three-member tribunal tasked with determining whether or not to annul the award (on jurisdiction) rendered in the dispute between the UK registered firm Malaysian Historical Salvors and the Government of Malaysia.

=== Arbitral fora ===
Schwebel was chairman or party appointed arbitrator in International Chamber of Commerce (ICC), International Centre for Settlement of Investment Disputes (ICSID), American Arbitration Association (AAA), Arbitration Institute of the Stockholm Chamber of Commerce (SCC), London Court of International Arbitration (LCIA), Permanent Court of Arbitration (PCA), Japan Commercial Arbitration Association (JCAA) and United Nations Commission on International Trade Law (UNCITRAL) ad hoc proceedings.

=== Notable cases ===
Case	Ruling date	Position	Forum	Parties	Claimant/s	Respondent	Notes
Merck Sharpe & Dohme (I.A.) LLC v. The Republic of Ecuador	Pending	Member of Tribunal	PCA	Ecuador; Merck Sharpe & Dohme	Merck Sharpe & Dohme	Ecuador	In deliberations.
Yukos Investor Cases Yukos Universal Ltd. v. Russian Federation Hully Entprise Ltd. v. Russian Federation Veteran Petroleum Ltd. v. Russian Federation	July 28, 2014	Member of Tribunal	PCA	Russian Federation; Yukos Universal Ltd. Hully Enterprise Ltd. Veteran Petroleum Ltd.	Yukos Universal Ltd. Hully Enterprise Ltd. Veteran Petroleum Ltd.	Russian Federation	Largest arbitration award in history (Claimants). Schwebel appointed to tribunal by Russian Federation.
Kishanganga / Neelum River Hydro Electric Project (Kashmir)	December 20, 2013	Chairman of Tribunal	PCA	Pakistan; India	Pakistan	India	A partial award was rendered on February 18, 2013.
Helnan International Hotels v. Arab Republic of Egypt	June 14, 2010	President of Ad hoc Committee	ICSID	Egypt; Helnan International Hotels	Helnan International Hotels	Egypt	Helnan denied claims. Arbitral Tribunal's Award of July 3, 2008. Annulled.
Abyei Boundary Dispute	July 22, 2009	Member of Tribunal	PCA	Sudan's People Liberation Movement; Army, Government of Sudan	N/A	N/A	Award ordered redrawing of the northern, eastern and western boundaries - decreasing size of Abyei.
Malaysian Historical Salvors v. Malaysia	April 16, 2009	President of Ad hoc Committee	ICSID	Malaysia; Malaysian Historical Salvors	Malaysian Historical Salvors	Malaysia	Award on jurisdiction rendered May 17, 2007
Turkish Telecoms v. Government of Kazachstan	July 29, 2008	President of Ad hoc Committee	ICSID	Turkish Telecoms; Kazakhstan	Turkish Telecoms	Kazakhstan	
Waguib Elie, George Siag and Clorinda Vecchi v. Arab Republic of Egypt	April 11, 2007	President of Committee	ICSID	Egypt; Waguib Elie, George Siag, Clorinda Vecchi	Waguib Elie, George Siag, Clorinda Vecchi	Egypt	Tribunal determined Egypt had unlawfully expropriated Claimant's investment.
Barbados / Trinidad and Tobago Maritime Delimitation Arbitration	April 11, 2006	President of Tribunal	PCA	Barbados; Trinidad & Tobago	Barbados	Trinidad & Tobago	
Eritrea – Ethiopia Boundary Commission	April 13, 2002	Member of Commission	PCA	Ethiopia; Eritrea	N/A	N/A	Commission's ruling rejected by Ethiopia. Border remains militarized and in dispute. Schwebel appointed by Eritrea.
Southern Bluefin Tuna Case	August 4, 2000	President of Tribunal	ICSID	New Zealand; Australia; Japan	New Zealand; Australia	Japan	
Eritrea / Yemen Arbitration	October 9, 1998	Member of Tribunal	PCA	Eritrea; Yemen	N/A	N/A	Sovereignty of islands determined by prior use and possession. Maritime delimitation ruling rendered on December 17, 1999. Schwebel appointed to tribunal by Eritrea.

== Positions ==
- Judge, Administrative Tribunal of the World Bank,(Member, 2007–Present).
- Member, Permanent Court of Arbitration (PCA), The Hague, The Netherlands, 2006–Present.
- Member, Board of Directors of the American Arbitration Association, 2006–Present.
- Member, Panel of Arbitrators of the Japan Commercial Arbitration Association, 2003–Present.
- Member, Institut pour le Arbitrage International, 2001–Present.
- Member, Panel of Conciliators and of Arbitrators of the International Centre for Settlement of Investment Disputes (ICSID), 2000–Present.
- Member, International Centre for Dispute Resolution Roster of Neutrals of the AAA, 2000–Present.
- Editor (honorary), American Journal of International Law, 1996–Present (Member of the Board of Editors, 1967–1981).
- Member, Institute de Droit International, 1981–Present.
- Council on Foreign Relations, 1956–Present.
- Member, the American Society of International Law, 1956–Present.
- Member, International Law Association, 1956–Present.

== Past non-elected positions ==
- World Bank Administrative Tribunal

President of Tribunal, 2010–2017

- International Monetary Fund Administrative Tribunal

President of Tribunal, 1994–2010

- American Society of International Law

Honorary Vice President, 1996–2001
Honorary Vice-President, 1983–1996
Executive Vice President & Executive Director, 1967–1973

- United Nations International Law Commission, Geneva

Special Rapporteur on the Law of the Non-Navigational Users of International Watercourses, 1977–1981
Chairman of the Drafting Committee, 1978
Member, 1977–1981

- United States Department of State, Washington, D.C.

Deputy legal adviser, 1974–1981
Counselor on international law, 1973
Consultant to the Department of State, 1967–1973
Special assistant to the assistant secretary of state for international organization affairs, 1966–1967
Assistant legal adviser for United Nations affairs, 1961–1966
United Nations – UNCTAD Working Group on a Charter of Economic Rights and Duties of States (1973–1974)
United Nations – Special Committee on the Question of Defining Aggression (1971)
United Nations – Special Committee on Principles of International Law concerning Friendly Relations and Co-operation among States (1964)
United Nations – Legal adviser to the United States delegation, and Alternate Representative in the Sixth Committee, during sessions of the U.N. General Assembly, 1961–1965

- Johns Hopkins University School of Advanced International Studies

Burling Professor of International Law, 1967–1981

- Harvard Law School

Assistant professor of law, 1959–1961

- White & Case LLP, New York

Attorney, 1954–1959

== Awards ==
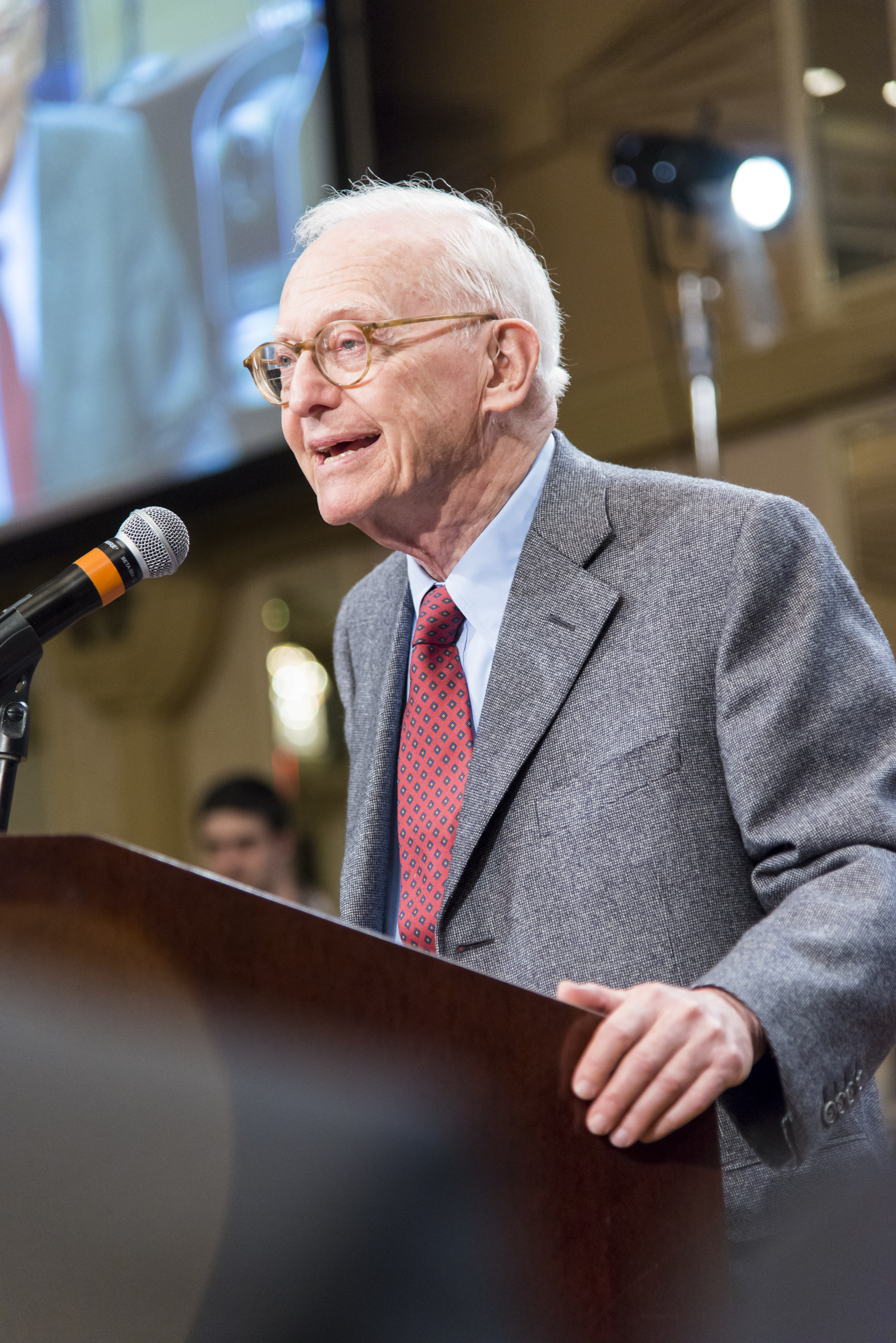
Judge Schwebel as the keynote speaker at the 2014 final of the Philip C. Jessup International Law Moot Court Competition. Schwebel wrote the first compromis for the competition in 1959–60.

- Honorary Fellow, Trinity College, Cambridge University, 2005
- LL.D., University of Miami, 2002 (honorary)
- Honorary President, American Society of International Law, 1996–2001
- Manley O. Hudson Medal, American Society of International Law, 2000
- Honorary Bencher, Grays Inn, London, 1998
- Wolfgang Friedman Award, Columbia University Law School, 1998
- Medal of Merit, Yale Law School, 1997
- LL.D. Hofstra University, 1997 (honorary)
- Presidential Medal, The Johns Hopkins University, 1992
- Weill Medal, New York University School of Law, 1992
- LL.D., Bhopal University, India, 1983 (honorary)
- Gherini Prize, Yale Law School, 1954
- Frank Knox Memorial Fellowship, Harvard University, 1950
- Phi Beta Kappa, Harvard University, 1950

== Selected works ==
- "International Arbitration: Three Salient Problems (Hersch Lauterpacht Memorial Lectures)." 1993, Cambridge.
- "Justice in International Law – Selected Writings of Judge Stephen M. Schwebel." 2008, Cambridge.
- "Justice in International Law – Further Selected Writings." 2011, Cambridge.
- "The Secretary-General of the United Nations: His Powers and Practice." 1952, Harvard.
