= Rationale for the 2026 Iran war =

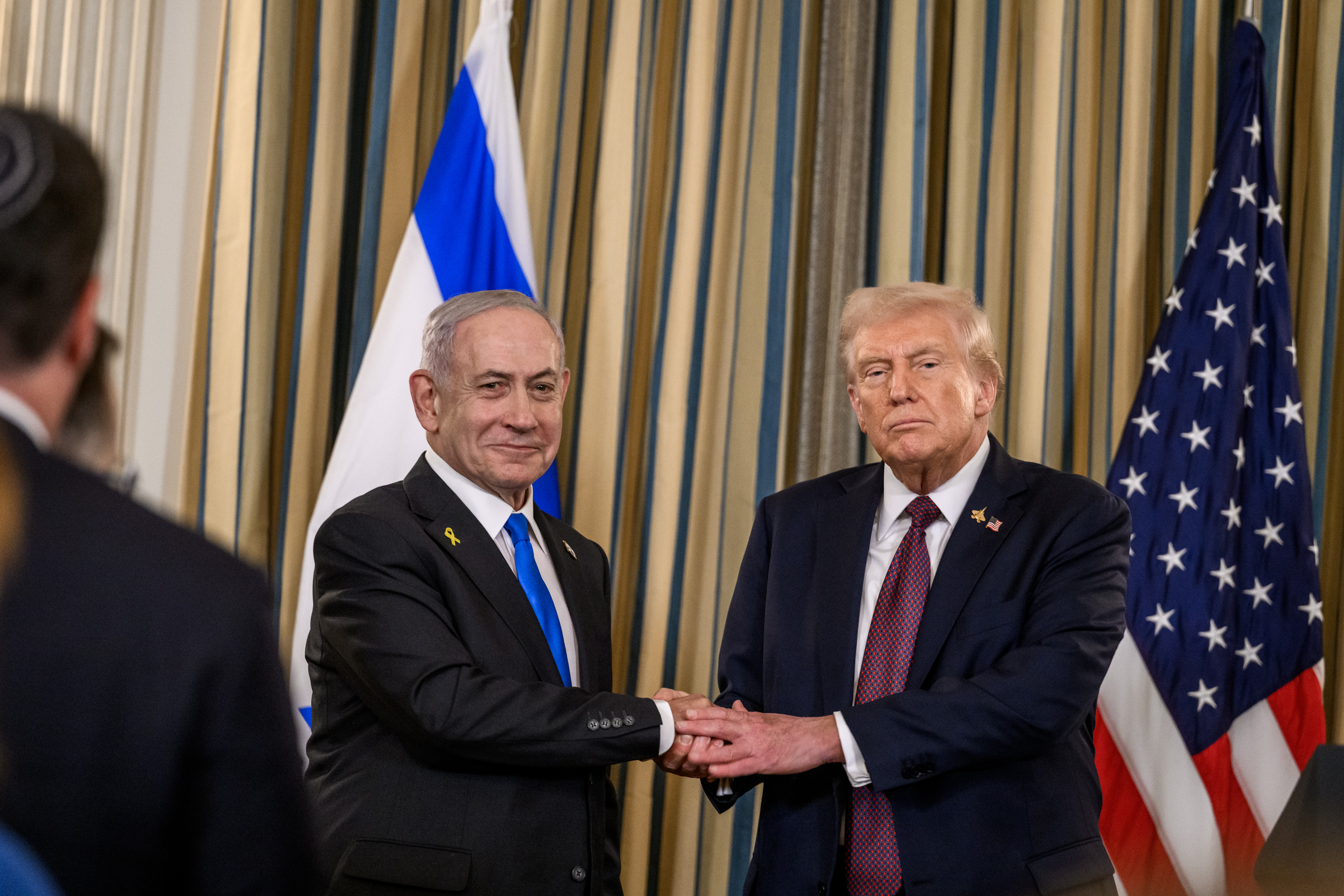
US president Donald Trump with Israeli Prime Minister Benjamin Netanyahu on 29 September 2025

Numerous reasons have been given by different people for the 2026 Iran war, which began when the United States and Israel launched surprise airstrikes on Iran on 28 February 2026. The reasons are described as diverse, changing, and at times contradictory.

US and Israeli officials have framed it as a preemptive war of self-defense. They argue that diplomacy had failed to contain the unacceptable and potentially existential threats of Iran's nuclear program and ballistic missiles. They also argued the strikes were justified as a response to Iran's regional activities (support for proxy groups, attacks on shipping, etc.) and its violent suppression of domestic protests in January 2026. Another reason cited by the Trump administration for starting the war was the intention to capture Iran's oil and gas resources. Critics have described it as a war of choice. Some analysts describe the war as a classic "security dilemma", where both sides saw the other's military buildup as threatening, making conflict increasingly likely even if neither side necessarily wanted full-scale war. Regional actors, like Saudi Arabia and the United Arab Emirates, share many of the US and Israel's war aims though differing on whether to pursue war or diplomacy.

== US rationale ==
In the United States, Trump administration officials have offered various and conflicting rationales for the war, such as to ward off an imminent Iranian threat, to pre-empt Iranian retaliation against US assets after an expected Israeli attack on Iran, to destroy Iran's missile and military capabilities, to prevent Iran from obtaining a nuclear weapon, to secure Iran's natural resources. Several statements were reportedly made by some United States officials such as the Secretary of Defense Pete Hegseth, justifying the action from a Christian religious perspective, some of which described the situation as a holy war.

Trump also aimed to achieve regime change by bringing the Iranian opposition to power. Trump cheered on the Iranian protestors and urged them to "take over", promising that "HELP IS ON ITS WAY". However, more than five months into the conflict, this has been "one of the most glaring unfulfilled objectives" with many Iranians reporting a sense of betrayal. Trump later said that he never really believed that the uprising he encouraged would happen anyway.

Trump announcing Operation Epic Fury on February 28, 2026, stating the US's rationale and military objectives

President Donald Trump has stated the goals of the war were to destroy Iran's ballistic missiles, eliminate their navy, prevent them from acquiring nuclear weapons, and to stop Iranian proxies from holding power. Trump asserted that Iran's ballistic missile program could endanger US allies "throughout the world", including Europe and American mainland. Pete Hegseth said that Iran would be capable of nuclear blackmail with their ballistic missiles if the US did not attack it. However, a Defense Intelligence Agency assessment determined that Iran would not be capable of building intercontinental ballistic missiles until 2035. Secretary of State Marco Rubio warned that Iran posed an "imminent threat" to US bases in the event of Israeli strikes on Iran, thereby portraying the war as a preemptive one.

Mike Johnson, the Speaker of the United States House of Representatives and Rubio said that Israel was going to attack Iran, after which Iran's retaliations against US bases would have brought them into war anyway. Senator Mark Warner of the Senate Intelligence Committee who was briefed by Rubio before the war began said that there was no evidence that Iran was going to launch a pre-emptive strike against the US, and that the war was ultimately decided upon by Israel. Trump rejected these claims, stating that "I might have forced their hands. You see, we were having negotiations with these lunatics, and it was my opinion that they [the Iranians] were going to attack first."

On April 2, US president Trump stated he does not "care" about Iran's stock of highly enriched uranium (HEU) as it is underground, contradicting a key rationale he brought up when starting the war. In fact, Iran's HEU stock is now assessed as a more risky scenario than before the war began, as it would leave Iran significantly closer to the capability of making nuclear bombs than the proposed settlement being negotiated in Geneva two days before the war began. Iran's development of HEU stockpile itself is the consequence of Trump's decision in 2018 to withdraw from a multilateral nuclear deal.

Another reason given by the Trump administration for initiating the war was the desire to seize Iran's oil and gas resources.

According to the political scientist Vali Nasr, Trump aspired to become the American president who finally resolved the Iran problem.

On 7 October, US secretary of state Marco Rubio said in a speech in Athens that US and Europe must rediscover the values of conquest and expansion. (see also: American expansionism under Donald Trump)

=== Domestic pressures in the US ===
Some critics have described the United States intervention against Iran as a diversionary war, noting mounting domestic pressures including intense public scrutiny following the publication of the Epstein files, Operation Metro Surge by ICE, and the economic impact of global tariffs which have contributed to falling approval ratings and legal actions. Representative Thomas Massie and former Representative Marjorie Taylor Greene argued Trump started the war as a distraction from the Epstein files.

=== After the Islamabad Memorandum ===
Following the resumption of hostilities on July 8, ending the Islamabad Memorandum, initial punitive strikes against Iran had gradually morphed into an attempt to "break Iran’s grip on the strait".

== Israeli rationale ==
Since the establishment of the Islamic Republic of Iran in 1979, the regime has repeatedly called for Israel's destruction, which, in combination with Iran's alleged nuclear aspirations and its sponsorship of militias, has led Israel to view Iran as an existential threat. Israeli officials have viewed Iran's ballistic missile program and nuclear capabilities as an existential threat. US Senator Mark Warner has stated that Iran's ballistic missiles are not a threat to the US, but that they are to Israel.

Benjamin Netanyahu, the Prime Minister of Israel, had wanted to attack Iran for decades, and made plans for such an attack in an earlier term as prime minister, more than a decade earlier. Trump getting into office provided Netanyahu with a good opportunity to pressure the US to attack Iran, especially after its proxies such as Hezbollah are not as powerful as they used to be. Throughout the war, Israeli strategy has reflected the aim of eliminating Iran as a rival regional power. Israeli strikes have targeted Iran's political elites broadly across differing factions and currents, undermining the possibility of regime change, while Israeli officials and intelligence agencies have also incited and backed ethnic separatist causes which threaten Iran's internal stability.

=== Domestic pressures in Israel ===
Netanyahu has faced charges for corruption, and the war may have helped him avoid dealing with these. The war may also help the Israeli government to overhaul Israel's Supreme Court, mitigate criticism of Israel's treatment of Palestinians, and help Netanyahu with the 2026 Israeli legislative election. The war has made Netanyahu more popular, increasing his approval rating from a tie with Naftali Bennett to 62%. Some analysts suggest that Netanyahu will call for a snap election due to the extra support from the war.

== Regional actors ==
Saudi Arabia and the United Arab Emirates share the US and Israel's stated objectives of restricting Iran's nuclear, drone and missile programs, though they differ on whether war or diplomacy is the best path. According to The Washington Post, crown prince and Prime Minister of Saudi Arabia Mohammed bin Salman had urged Trump to attack Iran in multiple phone calls, and that the Saudi Arabian and Israeli governments lobbied Trump repeatedly to make the move in the weeks leading up to the initial strikes. It has also been reported that Saudi Arabia pushed Trump to continue the war against Iran until its government is overthrown. These allegations were denied by Saudi Arabia.

== Religion ==
=== Christianity ===
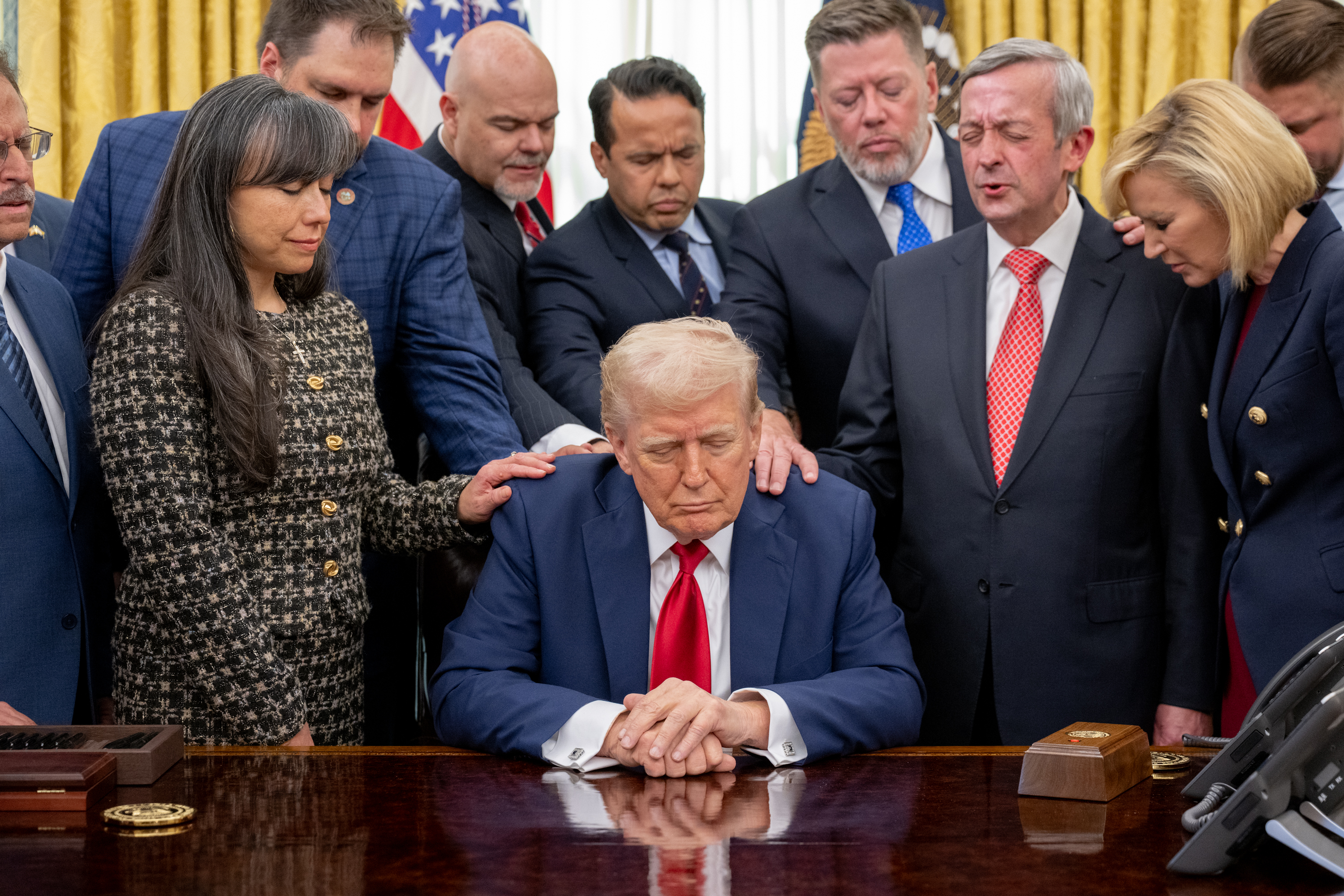
Donald Trump praying with faith leaders at the White House, 19 March 2025

In the United States, religious justifications were first developed in the 19th century and are primarily supported by protestants who believe in dispensationalism.

The watchdog group Military Religious Freedom Foundation disclosed they were told that the war was a part of God's plan, and that some military commanders have compared the war to the end times, especially Armageddon, an event in which Jesus returns in what is known as the second coming and is mentioned in the Book of Revelation. One officer complained that he was told by a commander that Donald Trump was anointed by Jesus. Some US politicians are calling for investigations of this. One of the major original complainants of this was himself a Christian. However, the allegations are still unverified.

Pete Hegseth, attending a Christian worship service, prayed for there to be "overwhelming violence of action against those who deserve no mercy." This was later met with rebuke by Pope Leo XIV, condemning those who wage war and have "hands full of blood" and stating that God "does not listen to the prayers of those who wage war, but rejects them."

On 6 April 2026, Trump asserted that God supports the US–Israeli war on Iran "because God is good, and God wants to see people taken care of." Hegseth, meanwhile, likened the US F-15E rescue operation in Iran to the resurrection of Jesus, stating that the missing airman was rescued from Iranian territory on Easter Sunday.

=== Judaism ===
Israeli prime minister Benjamin Netanyahu referenced the Torah and compared Iran to the ancient biblical enemy of the Amalekites, stating "We read in this week's Torah portion, 'Remember what Amalek did to you.' We remember—and we act." The Council on American–Islamic Relations condemned Netanyahu for "once again using the biblical story of Amalek—which claims that God commanded the Israelites to murder every man, woman, child and animal in a pagan nation that attacked them—to justify Israel's mass murder of civilians in Iran, just as it did in Gaza."

=== Religious criticisms ===
Many Christians criticized the war. Robert McElroy, a Cardinal for the Catholic Church, called for an end for the war, and Leo XIV, the current Pope echoed this statement. Hegseth in response attempted to appeal to earlier times in the Catholic Church, particularly the era of the Crusades. However, the Crusaders were not only anti-Muslim but also anti-Jewish.

=== Analysis of religious justifications for the war ===
Nader Hashemi, director of the Alwaleed Center for Muslim-Christian Understanding, argued that religious justifications played a large role behind the war. Gregg Roman, the director of Middle East Forum, said that there are Judeo-Christian justifications being made for the war. Professor Jolyon Mitchell noted that both sides of the war profess divine favor. Abusharif said that in the United States, religious justifications for this war are the most appealing among Christian Zionists and evangelical Christians. He also said that the war is not theological, but geopolitical. However, Riaz Khokhar of Al Jazeera argued that religion plays just as much of a role in the war as strategy.

== See also ==
- Iran and weapons of mass destruction
- Catholic peace traditions
- Christian pacifism
- Christianity and violence
- Just war theory
- Military applications of artificial intelligence
- Peace churches
- Reactions to the 2026 Iran war
- Regime change efforts in the 2026 Iran war
- Analysis of the 2026 Iran war
- Use of religious language and symbolism in the Gaza war
