= Davis Robinson =

American politician (born 1940)

15th Legal Adviser of the Department of State
- In office July 27, 1981 – February 27, 1985
- President: Ronald Reagan
- Preceded by: Roberts Bishop Owen
- Succeeded by: Abraham David Sofaer

Personal details
- Born: Davis Rowland Robinson; July 11, 1940 (age 85) New York, U.S
- Spouse: Suzanne Walker (m. 1959)
- Parents: Thomas Porter Robinson; John F. Degener
- Education: Yale College, Harvard Law School
- Alma mater: Harvard Law School

Davis Rowland Robinson (born July 11, 1940) is an American retired politician who served as the 15th Legal Adviser of the Department of State from July 1981 to February 1985 under the Reagan Administration. This came after former diplomat Roberts Bishop Owen resigned from the duty. He was nominated by Ronald Reagan for the position.

== Life ==
Robinson was born on July 11, 1940 in New York to parents Thomas Porter Robinson and John F. Degener. He married Suzanne Walker on June 11, 1959. He earned a Bachelor of Arts from Yale College in 1961 and another from Harvard Law School in 1967.
