= Lucy W. Benson =

American government official (1927–2021)

- Benson as President of League of Women Voters, meeting with President Nixon, left, and Sen.Ted Kennedy, out of frame

4th Under Secretary of State for International Security Affairs
- In office March 28, 1977 – January 5, 1980
- President: Jimmy Carter
- Preceded by: Carlyle E. Maw
- Succeeded by: Matthew Nimetz

Massachusetts Secretary of Human Services
- In office 1975–1977
- Governor: Michael Dukakis
- Preceded by: Peter C. Goldmark Jr.
- Succeeded by: Jerald Stevens

Personal details
- Born: Lucy Peters Wilson; August 25, 1927 New York City, New York, U.S.
- Died: July 17, 2021 (aged 93) Amherst, Massachusetts, U.S.
- Spouse: Bruce Buzzell Benson (m. 1950; died 1990)
- Parent: Willard O. Wilson (father)

Lucy Peters Wilson Benson (August 25, 1927 – July 17, 2021) was an American government official who served as the Under Secretary of State for Arms Control and International Security Affairs from 1977 to 1980. When Benson was named to this post, it was the highest position ever held by a woman in the United States Department of State.

Prior to joining the State Department, Benson served as President of the League of Women Voters (1968 to 1974) and Massachusetts Secretary of Human Services from 1975 to 1977. She has also been a member of the Lafayette College Board of Trustees since 1985.

Political offices
Preceded by Carlyle E. Maw	Under Secretary of State for Arms Control and International Security Affairs; March 28, 1977–January 5, 1980	Succeeded by Matthew Nimetz
Preceded by Peter C. Goldmark Jr.	Massachusetts Secretary of Human Services; 1975–1977	Succeeded by Jerald Stevens
Preceded by Julia Davis Stuart	President of the League of Women Voters; 1968–1974	Succeeded by Ruth Clusen
