= Carlyle E. Maw =

American diplomat (1903–1987)

3rd Under Secretary of State for International Security Affairs
- In office July 10, 1974 – September 17, 1976
- Preceded by: William H. Donaldson
- Succeeded by: Lucy W. Benson

11th Legal Adviser of the Department of State
- In office November 27, 1973 – July 9, 1974
- Preceded by: John Reese Stevenson
- Succeeded by: Monroe Leigh

Personal details
- Born: October 13, 1903 Provo, Utah, U.S.
- Died: December 1, 1987 (aged 84) Washington, D.C., U.S.
- Children: 3
- Education: Brigham Young University; Harvard Law School

Carlyle Elwood Maw (October 13, 1903 – December 1, 1987) was Under Secretary of State for International Security Affairs from July 10, 1974, to September 17, 1976. Born in Provo, Utah, he graduated from Brigham Young University and from Harvard Law School.

He had been an attorney in New York City when he went to work for Henry Kissinger as a legal advisor. He was appointed on November 23, 1973, and held this post from November 27, 1973, to July 9, 1974. Later, as Undersecretary he acted as the President's Special Representative at the 1975 Law of the Sea conferences. After his return to private practice he also served as chair of the Public Advisory Committee on the Law of the Sea. He died in 1987 in Washington, D.C.

He had two sons and one daughter.

== Writings ==
- What Law Now for the Seas, edited by Carlisle Maw, May 1984.

Legal offices
| Preceded by John R. Stevenson | Legal Adviser of the Department of State; November 27, 1973–July 9, 1974 | Succeeded by Monroe Leigh |
Political offices
| Preceded by William H. Donaldson | Undersecretary of State for International Security Affairs; July 10, 1974–September 17, 1976 | Succeeded by Lucy W. Benson |
