= Ruth Clusen =

- Born: June 11, 1922; Bruce, Wisconsin
- Died: March 14, 2005 (aged 82)
- Education: University of Wisconsin-Eau Claire
- Occupation: President of the League of Women Voters
- Known for: Environmental and Civil Rights activism

Ruth Chickering Clusen (June 11, 1922 – March 14, 2005) was an American conservationist, politician, civil rights activist, and government official. She is remembered for serving as the president of the League of Women Voters, for hosting the debates between Jimmy Carter and Gerald Ford, and for serving as the Assistant Secretary of Energy under President Jimmy Carter.

== Early life ==
Clusen was born in Bruce, Wisconsin. She attended the University of Wisconsin-Eau Claire, graduating in 1945 with a degree in secondary education. She began her career as a teacher at the Blackfoot Indian Reservation in Montana.

== Career ==
We speak dry words at times, but if one has eyes to see and the mind to perceive that what we are working for is the quality of our environment in this and the next generation, one cannot but feel a quickening of the senses.

— Ruth Clusen

Clusen began her national career as the president of the League of Women Voters, a position she held from 1974 to 1978. During her tenure, Clusen was instrumental in bringing issues relating to the environment to national attention. She was especially concerned with water purity, a fixation that stemmed from her time spent in Green Bay where water contamination was a problem. Additionally, Clusen fought for women's rights. She was a leading figure in the League's ultimately unsuccessful attempt to ratify an equal rights amendment for women. Additionally, in her role as president, Clusen served as the presidential debate moderator for Jimmy Carter and Gerald Ford. Her role as moderator was famously parodied by Lily Tomlin on Saturday Night Live.

After Carter won the election, he appointed Clusen to serve as the Assistant Secretary for the Environment at the United States Department of Energy. She held the position from 1978 to 1981. Clusen worked for a reduction of fossil fuel consumption at the Energy Department. After an unsuccessful bid for the United States Congress, Clusen finished her career as a member of the University of Wisconsin Board of Regents, the governing body of the University of Wisconsin System.

Preceded by Lucy W. Benson	President of the League of Women Voters; 1974–1978	Succeeded by Ruth Hinerfeld
