= Use of religious language and symbolism in the Gaza war =

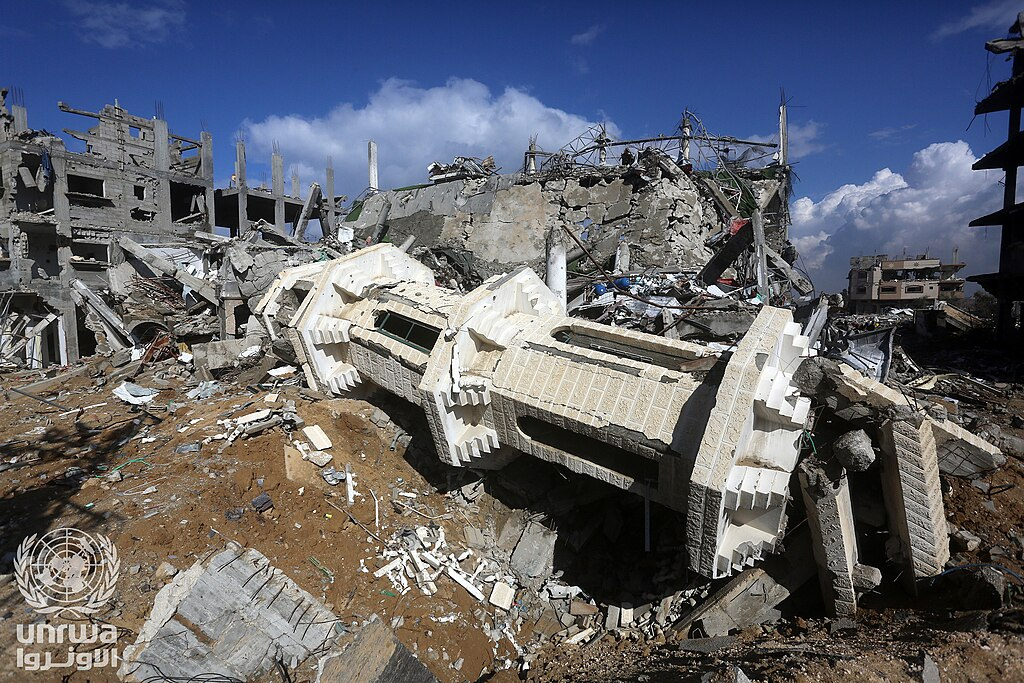
Destroyed mosque in the Gaza Strip, 2025

During the Gaza war (2023–present), both Israel and Hamas have consistently and extensively employed religious language and symbolism in framing military actions and constructing narratives, reflecting the strengthening and dominance of religiously oriented factions in the region at a level not seen before in the broader Israeli–Palestinian conflict.

== 7 October attacks ==
Hamas spokesman "Abu Obeida" (Huthayfa Samir Abdallah al-Kahlout) justified the 7 October attacks in part by citing the plans of Jewish extremists and some Christian Zionists to sacrifice a red heifer in Jerusalem, in order to bring about the demolition of Al-Aqsa, the construction of the Third Temple over it, and the coming of the Messiah. One senior Palestinian source in touch with Hamas identified the animal sacrifice plans as the key trigger for the attacks.

The heifer cannot have a single non-red hair. In September 2022, five suitable red heifers supplied by a Christian Zionist rancher in Texas, United States, had been brought to Israel; Netanel Isaac, the director-general of Israel's Ministry of Heritage, was among those welcoming the arrival of the heifers at Ben-Gurion Airport. Most Israeli Jews criticized the efforts as needless and dangerously provocative. In September 2023, the Temple Institute, an Israeli organization seeking to build the Third Temple, announced the birth of its own suitable heifer.

On the Gazan side, the name for the 7 October attacks is "Operation Al-Aqsa Flood", a reference to the special significance of Al-Aqsa and Jerusalem in Islam. The name has also been characterized as a reference to the story of Noah and the worldwide flood narrative, in the sense of a shared punitive essence.

Hamas published an official logo for the operation, which visually incorporates a Quranic verse from Surah al-Ma'idah 5:23, which reads "Enter upon them through the gate, and when you enter it, you will be the victors". The original context of the verse refers to the Israelite conquest of Canaan, with a Jerusalem Post article speculating that Hamas is identifying theologically with the ancient Israelites in a supersessionist approach, and is thus likewise characterizing the modern Israeli state as theologically illegitimate.

== Israeli invasion of the Gaza Strip ==
Following the 7 October attacks, Israeli prime minister Benjamin Netanyahu cited the Hebrew Bible and compared the Israelites' conflict with the Amalekites to the nascent Israeli invasion into the Gaza Strip, using a verse which some scholars say implies genocide of the Amalekites. While the Israeli government named the war the "Iron Swords war" and later the "War of Redemption", three other proposals initially circulated: "Genesis War", "Simchat Torah War", and "Wind War" (taken from the Hebrew mashiv haruach– "the blowing of the wind", part of a short prayer for rain recited by Jews during Simchat Torah).

However, Netanyahu also began intensifying usage of "Judeo-Christian" rhetoric in his speeches, seeking to frame Israel as a partner to the Christian West against Islam, and using this concept as a device to legitimize the Gaza genocide.

In December 2023, Israeli warplanes dropped leaflets over the southern Gaza Strip bearing a Quranic verse: "The flood overtook them, while they persisted in wrongdoing", another reference to the story of Noah. Social media users speculated whether the verse alluded to Israel's plan to flood tunnel networks in Gaza with seawater.

In November 2024, Palestinian financial expert and activist Ramy Abdu falsely claimed that Gazan Christians were collaborating with Israel to drop evangelization flyers from warplanes over Gaza, but later deleted the post after it was debunked.

From 16 May to 4 August 2025, Israeli forces carried out an offensive throughout the Gaza Strip that was titled "Operation Gideon's Chariots". The operation was named after the Israelite warrior Gideon, who led a successful battle against the Midianites, as described in Judges 6. Hamas responded with a counteroffensive that it called "Stones of David", referring to the Israelite king David.

Similarly, Israel called its 2025 Gaza City offensive "Operation Gideon's Chariots II", framing it as a second part to the earlier offensive. Hamas titled its counteroffensive "Operation Moses' Staff" in response, referring to the Hebrew prophet Moses.

== See also ==
- Religious war
- Holy Land
- Islamic–Jewish relations
- Tahrif
- Intent and incitement in the Gaza genocide
- Religious justifications for the 2026 Iran war
- Abrahamic religions
- Jewish supremacy
