= Oil Platforms case =

2003 legal case between Iran and the United States

- Court: International Court of Justice
- Full case name: Oil Platforms (Islamic Republic of Iran v. United States of America)
- Decided: 6 November 2003
- Citation: [2003] ICJ 4
- Transcript: [2003] ICJ Rep 161 (6 November 2003)

Case opinions
- https://www.icj-cij.org/en/case/90

The Oil Platforms case (formally, Oil Platforms (Islamic Republic of Iran v. United States of America) ICJ 4) is a public international law case decided by the International Court of Justice in 2003 in which Iran challenged the U.S. Navy's destruction of three oil platforms in the Persian Gulf in 1987–1988. The Court affirmed that it could exercise jurisdiction over the case based on the 1955 Treaty of Amity, Economic Relations and Consular Rights between the United States and Iran but decided with strong majorities against both Iran's claim and the United States' counterclaim.

== Facts ==
In 1987–1988, the United States destroyed three offshore oil platforms owned by the National Iranian Oil Company as a part of Operation Praying Mantis in retaliation for the collision of the USS Samuel B. Roberts with a mine in international waters near Bahrain. In November 1992, Iran filed a claim before the ICJ, alleging that the U.S. Navy's actions constituted a violation of the 1955 U.S.-Iranian Treaty of Amity, Economic Relations and Consular Rights (United States–Iran) and a violation of international law. The United States filed a preliminary objection challenging the Court's jurisdiction over the case and also filed a counter-claim that Iran had also breached its obligations under the Treaty of Amity for attacking vessels in the Persian Gulf and for endangering commerce and navigation in the area.

== Judgments ==
On December 12, 1996, the Court rejected the U.S. preliminary objection to the Court's jurisdiction, by a vote of fourteen to two, holding that it could exercise jurisdiction under the Treaty of Amity. The two dissenters were Vice President Stephen Schwebel (nationality: U.S.) and Judge Oda (Japan), each of whom wrote dissenting opinions. Among the majority, separate opinions were appended by Judge Shahabuddeen (Guyana), Judge Ranjeva (Madagascar), Judge Higgins (UK), and Judge Parra-Aranguren (Venezuela), and Judge ad hoc Francois Rigaux (Belgium, appointed by Iran).

On March 10, 1998, the Court held that the U.S. counter-claim against Iran, concerning the mining of and other attacks on U.S. shipping, was admissible because it was directly connected to Iran’s original claim over the U.S. attacks on Iranian oil platforms and involved alleged violations of the same 1955 Treaty of Amity. This allowed the Court to examine both parties’ claims during the proceedings on the merits, without determining Iran’s responsibility for the alleged attacks.

Oral arguments were held between February 17 and March 7, 2003.

On November 6, 2003, 11 years after the initial application was submitted by Iran, the ICJ rejected the claims of both states. First, the Court found by a vote of 14–2 (dissenting Judge Al-Khasawneh (Jordan), Judge Elaraby (Egypt)) that the U.S. actions against Iranian oil platforms in 1987 and 1988 could not be justified under the treaty's essential security exception but that they did not breach the treaty's freedom of commerce provision because, at the time, the oil platforms were under repair and non-operational and, thus, the attack did not affect freedom of commerce between the United States and Iran. Thus, Iran's claim against the United States could not be upheld. Second, the Court found by a vote of 15–1 (dissenting Judge Simma (Germany)) that the U.S. counter-claim against Iran could not be upheld for similar reasons: the vessels attacked by Iran were not shown to have been engaged in any commerce between the United States and Iran and thus did not impede commerce or navigation between the parties. (Paragraph 125 of the Decision.) Eleven judges attached declarations or separate opinions.

== See also ==
- List of International Court of Justice cases
- Iran–Iraq War#U.S. military actions toward Iran
