= William H. Donaldson =

American businessman (1931–2024)

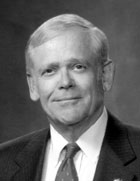

27th Chairman of the United States Securities and Exchange Commission
- In office February 18, 2003 – June 30, 2005
- President: George W. Bush
- Preceded by: Harvey Pitt
- Succeeded by: Christopher Cox

2nd Under Secretary of State for International Security Affairs
- In office November 26, 1973 – May 10, 1974
- President: Richard Nixon
- Preceded by: Curtis W. Tarr
- Succeeded by: Carlyle E. Maw

Personal details
- Born: June 2, 1931 Buffalo, New York, U.S.
- Died: June 12, 2024 (aged 93) Waccabuc, New York, U.S.
- Party: Republican
- Spouse: Jane Phillips Donaldson
- Children: 3
- Education: Yale University (BA); Harvard University (MBA)
- Occupation: SEC chairman

William Henry Donaldson (June 2, 1931 – June 12, 2024) was an American businessman who was the 27th Chairman of the U.S. Securities and Exchange Commission (SEC), serving from February 2003 to June 2005. He served as Under Secretary of State for International Security Affairs in the Nixon Administration, as a special adviser to Vice President Nelson Rockefeller, chairman and CEO of the New York Stock Exchange, and chairman, President and CEO of Aetna. Donaldson founded Donaldson, Lufkin & Jenrette.

== Early life and education ==
Donaldson attended both Yale University (B.A. 1953) and Harvard University (M.B.A. 1958). While he was a senior at Yale, he joined its Skull and Bones secret society.

He served in the United States Marine Corps as a first lieutenant in Japan and Korea (1953–55), as a rifle platoon commander and later as aide-de-camp to the Commanding General of the 1st Provisional Marine Air Ground Task Force.

== Career ==
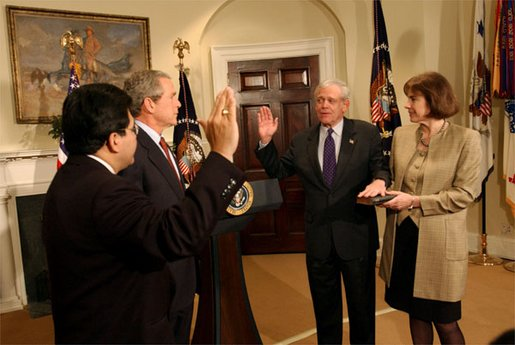
Donaldson is sworn in as the Chairman of the Securities and Exchange Commission in February 2003

Donaldson began his career at G. H. Walker & Co., a banking and brokerage firm.

Donaldson returned to Yale and founded the Yale School of Management, where he served as dean and professor of management studies. According to Lee Tom Perry, a former Brigham Young University professor of strategy and organizational behavior, Donaldson had a vision of Yale's management program forming students who could easily and seamlessly flow between public and private management roles. The first graduating class almost all took positions in business, with almost none taking jobs with government. The main building of the school continues to display a life-size portrait of him and the premier leadership award at Yale School of Management is called "Donaldson Fellows".

From 1999 - 2003, Donaldson was Chairman of the Carnegie Endowment for International Peace.

Donaldson was a chartered financial analyst (CFA) charter holder, where he received a number of honorary degrees, and was on the board of IEX.

== Personal life and death ==
William Donaldson was married to Jane Phillips Donaldson and together they had 3 children. He died on June 12, 2024, at the age of 93.

== Archives and records ==
- William H. Donaldson papers at Baker Library Special Collections & Archives, Harvard Business School.

Political offices
Preceded by Curtis W. Tarr	Undersecretary of State for International Security Affairs; 1973–1974	Succeeded by Carlyle E. Maw
Academic offices
New office	Dean of the Yale School of Management; 1975–1980	Succeeded by Geoffrey C. Hazard Jr.
Non-profit organization positions
Preceded by Robert Carswell	Chairman of the Carnegie Endowment for International Peace; 1999–2003	Succeeded by James C. Gaither
Government offices
Preceded by Harvey Pitt	Chairman of the United States Securities and Exchange Commission; 2003–2005	Succeeded by Christopher Cox
