= Abraham David Sofaer =

American judge

16th Legal Adviser of the Department of State
- In office June 10, 1985 – June 15, 1990
- Preceded by: Davis Rowland Robinson
- Succeeded by: Edwin D. Williamson

Judge of the United States District Court for the Southern District of New York
- In office March 23, 1979 – June 9, 1985
- Appointed by: Jimmy Carter
- Preceded by: Marvin E. Frankel
- Succeeded by: Michael Mukasey

Personal details
- Born: Abraham David Sofaer; May 6, 1938 (age 88) Bombay, India
- Party: Republican (since 1985); Democratic (until 1985)
- Relatives: Abraham Sofaer (cousin)
- Education: Yeshiva University (BA); New York University (LLB)

Abraham David Sofaer (born May 6, 1938) is an American attorney and jurist who served as a United States district judge of the United States District Court for the Southern District of New York and legal adviser to the United States State Department. After resigning from the State Department, he became the George P. Shultz Senior Fellow in Foreign Policy and National Security Affairs at the Hoover Institution.

== Early life and education ==
Born on May 6, 1938, in Bombay (now Mumbai), India, Sofaer received a Bachelor of Arts degree in 1962 (magna cum laude in American history) from Yeshiva University and a Bachelor of Laws from New York University School of Law in 1965, where he was editor-in-chief of the New York University Law Review.

== Career ==
After law school, Sofaer served as law clerk to Judge J. Skelly Wright of the United States Court of Appeals for the District of Columbia Circuit (1965–66), and for Justice William J. Brennan Jr. of the United States Supreme Court (1966 to 1967). From 1967 to 1969, he was an assistant United States Attorney in the Southern District of New York under Robert Morgenthau. His work focused on the use by Americans of foreign banks and other financial institutions to violate U.S. laws.

From 1969 to 1979, Sofaer was a professor of law at Columbia University School of Law, during which time he wrote the book War, Foreign Affairs, and Constitutional Power, an authoritative historical account of the constitutional powers of Congress and the president to control or affect issues related to the international use of force.

As a New York state administrative judge from 1975 to 1976, Sofaer handled the first major environmental action involving PCBs, regarding their discharge into the Hudson River by General Electric. After issuing an opinion holding GE liable despite its having been issued a license, Sofaer worked with Peter Berle, then head of the New York State Department of Environmental Conservation, Sarah Chassis, lead attorney for the Natural Resources Defense Council, and Jack Welch, then a vice president at GE, to settle the case in an agreement joined by 17 environmental organizations. This work led to Sofaer being recommended to a committee established by Senator Daniel Patrick Moynihan (chaired by former White House Counsel Leonard Garment) to screen candidates for the federal district courts in New York state.

=== Federal judicial service ===
Per the recommendation of United States Senator Daniel Patrick Moynihan, Sofaer was nominated by President Jimmy Carter on January 19, 1979, to a seat on the United States District Court for the Southern District of New York vacated by Judge Marvin E. Frankel. He was confirmed by the United States Senate on March 21, 1979, and received his commission on March 23, 1979. He resigned on June 9, 1985.

=== State Department ===
On June 9, 1985, then-Secretary of State George Shultz asked Sofaer to become Legal Adviser of the Department of State, a position in which he served until 1990. He assisted Shultz in forcing disclosures that led to the termination of arms dealings with Iran as part of the Iran-Contra scandal. According to his Hoover Institution biography, Sofaer "was principal negotiator in various interstate matters that were successfully resolved, including the dispute between Egypt and Israel over the Taba Border Crossing, the claim against Iraq for its attack on the USS Stark, and the claims against Chile for the assassination of exiled Chilean diplomat Orlando Letelier in Washington, D.C. Sofaer received the Distinguished Service Award in 1989, the highest State Department award given to a non-civil servant."

=== Return to private practice ===
After leaving the State Department, Sofaer practiced law at Hughes Hubbard & Reed in Washington, D.C., from 1990 to 1994.

He represented the World Wide Fund for Nature [World Wildlife Fund?] in its successful effort to establish a memorandum of understanding (MOU) for the management and sharing of authority within what remains the world’s most influential environmental organization. The WWF was represented by Lloyd Cutler.

During this period, Sofaer began acting as an arbitrator in major international and domestic disputes. He agreed to assist Libya in attempting to satisfy the United Nations Security Council resolutions issued against it concerning the Pan Am Flight 103 bombing. He worked out a plan with Libyan officials, including a trial of the suspects in The Hague and compensation for the families of victims, before accepting the assignment. After publicly obtaining a license for the work, however, Sofaer was attacked by some family members and criticized by U.S. officials who were opposed to any such negotiation. He withdrew from representation after concluding he could not be effective in implementing the agreed plan while defending himself.

Nonetheless, Sofaer was subjected to a grand jury investigation into whether he had made false statements in applying for the license from the Office of Foreign Assets Control to represent Libya. The investigation was terminated without any action against him, but the District of Columbia Bar found that Sofaer should be "informally admonished" for taking on the representation, on the ground that the U.S. government investigation of the bombing was a "matter" under the code of ethics, like a litigation or appeal, even though Libya was not even a suspect at the time Sofaer left the Department. The plan Sofaer developed was ultimately agreed and implemented by the U.S., the Security Council, and Libya.

In 1994, Sofaer was appointed George P. Shultz Senior Fellow in Foreign Policy and National Security Affairs at the Hoover Institution. His "work has focused on separation of powers issues in the American system of government, including the power over war, and on issues related to international law, terrorism, diplomacy, national security, the Middle East conflict, and water resources.” For several years, he taught a course on transnational law at the Stanford Law School, and also taught arbitration. While he was at Hoover, he published many op-eds, articles, chapters in books, and two books on international security issues: “The Best Defense?: Legitimacy and Preventive Force; Taking on Iran: Strength, Diplomacy & The Iranian Threat (Hoover 2013)."

=== Non-profit work ===
Sofaer is a founding member and former chairman of the National Jazz Museum in Harlem. He currently serves on its Board as Vice-Chair. He is a trustee of the Koret Foundation of San Francisco, a fellow of the Israel Museum, and a member of the International Advisory Boards of the Israel Democracy Institute and NGO Monitor. He has contributed significantly to the American Numismatic Society, which honored him and Marian Scheuer Sofaer at their ANS Annual Gala in 2014.

== Personal life ==
Sofaer's father was a cousin of the actor Abraham Sofaer. Their fathers Meyer and Isaac were born in Rangoon, Burma, the descendants of Jewish immigrants from Baghdad, Iraq. They built a trading business in Rangoon, the evidence of which can still be seen in the form of Sofaer’s Building, a large office and retail center which the city is attempting to restore along with other colonial era buildings.

== Publications ==
- "Taking The War To The Terrorists" in Forbes (10/08)
- "War of resources" about Hezbollah (8/06)
- "Should Dictators Be Put to Death?" with Kenneth Roth of Human Rights Watch, on the Council on Foreign Relations Web site (6/06).

== See also ==
- George H. W. Bush Supreme Court candidates#Names frequently mentioned
- List of law clerks for the third seat of the Supreme Court of the United States

Legal offices
Preceded by Marvin E. Frankel	Judge of the United States District Court for the Southern District of New York; 1979–1985	Succeeded by Michael Mukasey
Preceded by Davis Rowland Robinson	Legal Adviser of the Department of State; 1985–1990	Succeeded by Edwin D. Williamson
