= Jennifer Newstead (politician) =

American lawyer

Jennifer Gillian Newstead
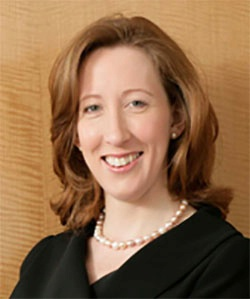

24th Legal Adviser of the Department of State
- In office January 22, 2018 – May 31, 2019
- President: Donald Trump
- Preceded by: Brian James Egan
- Succeeded by: Margaret L. Taylor (2024)

Personal details
- Born: Jennifer Gillian Newstead
- Education: Harvard University (BA); Yale University (JD)

Jennifer Gillian Newstead is an American attorney and technology executive. Newstead is senior vice president, general counsel, and head of government affairs at Apple Inc., where she oversees the company’s legal and government affairs. She previously served as the general counsel of Meta Platforms. Newstead was the first female legal adviser of the Department of State during the first presidency of Donald Trump.

== Career ==
Newstead graduated from Harvard University with a B.A. in 1991 and received a J.D. from Yale Law School in 1994. She then clerked for Judge Laurence Silberman of the United States Court of Appeals for the District of Columbia Circuit and Justice Stephen Breyer at the U.S. Supreme Court.

She was the legal adviser to the United States Department of State, a role confirmed by the US Senate and holding the rank of assistant secretary. Prior to that, she was a partner at the large corporate law firm Davis Polk & Wardwell. She was also general counsel of the Office of Management and Budget, principal deputy assistant attorney general at the United States Department of Justice's Office of Legal Policy, and associate counsel to the president of the United States. She is credited with helping to draft the Patriot Act. In December 2017, during her confirmation she was questioned about her views on the humanitarian crisis in Yemen.

Additionally, Newstead has served as an adjunct professor at Georgetown Law. In 2015, The American Lawyer recognized her for her work on transatlantic litigation.

In 2018, Newstead represented the United States as agent, counsel, and advocate in the case Alleged violations of the 1955 Treaty of Amity, Economic Relations, and Consular Rights (Islamic Republic of Iran v. United States of America) before the International Court of Justice.

Newstead joined Facebook as general counsel in 2019 and served as vice president and general counsel from June 2019 to 2021. She became chief legal officer of Meta Platforms in 2021, a position she held until 2025. As Meta’s chief legal officer, she led the company’s legal team during the Federal Trade Commission’s 2025 antitrust trial concerning Meta’s acquisitions of Instagram and WhatsApp. The antitrust trial concluded in May 2025, and a federal judge ruled in November that the FTC had failed to prove that Meta held a monopoly in the social-networking market, allowing the company to retain Instagram and WhatsApp.

Apple announced in December 2025 that Newstead would join the company as senior vice president in January 2026 and become general counsel on March 1. Apple combined its Legal and Government Affairs organizations under Newstead’s leadership as part of the executive transition.

== Board memberships and other roles ==
Newstead was elected to Emerson’s board of directors in May 2026, with her appointment taking effect in August. She also joined the board’s Compensation Committee and Corporate Governance and Nominating Committee.

Newstead also serves on the Board of Trustees of the National Constitution Center, the Executive Committee of the Association of General Counsel, and the State Department’s Advisory Committee on International Law.

== See also ==
- List of law clerks for the second seat of the Supreme Court of the United States
- Patriot Act
