= Roberts Bishop Owen =

American lawyer and diplomat

14th Legal Adviser of the Department of State
- In office October 4, 1979 – February 16, 1981
- Preceded by: Herbert J. Hansell
- Succeeded by: Davis Rowland Robinson

Personal details
- Born: February 11, 1926 Boston, Massachusetts
- Died: March 10, 2016 (aged 90) Washington, DC
- Education: Harvard University; Queens' College, Cambridge

Roberts Bishop Owen (February 11, 1926 – March 10, 2016) was an American lawyer and diplomat. He served as Legal Adviser of the Department of State from 1979 to 1981 and acted as a mediator and arbitrator in several international disputes.

== Early life ==
Owen was born in Boston and attended Phillips Exeter Academy. He served in the U.S. Navy during World War II before receiving undergraduate and law degrees at Harvard University in 1948 and 1951, respectively. He then attended Queens' College, Cambridge on a Fulbright Scholarship.

In 1952, Owen began practicing law at Covington & Burling in Washington, D.C. and later became a partner of that firm.

== Iran Hostage Crisis and Algiers Accords ==
President Jimmy Carter appointed Owen to be the U.S. State Department Legal Adviser in 1979. A few weeks after Owen took office, the Iran hostage crisis began in November 1979. In 1980, Owen argued on behalf of the United States in its case against Iran before the International Court of Justice at The Hague. Owen also participated in negotiations with Iranian representatives in Algiers in late 1980 and early 1981 as a member of the team led by Deputy Secretary of State Warren Christopher. Owen played a role in drafting the Algiers Accords that led to the January 1981 release of the U.S. embassy personnel being held captive in Tehran.

At the end of the Carter Administration, Owen returned to the practice of law at Covington & Burling, from which he retired in 1996.

== Balkans Conflict and Dayton Accords ==
In 1995, then-Secretary of State Warren Christopher asked Owen to assist negotiator Richard Holbrooke in efforts to resolve conflicts arising from the Breakup of Yugoslavia. As part of Holbrooke's delegation during negotiations with the combatants, Owen acted as a mediator and the draftsman of proposals that led to the Dayton Agreement. According to Holbrooke, after one occasion in which the "normally dignified" Owen expressed his frustration with the behavior of one Bosnian negotiator by slamming his fist against a wall, his American colleagues gave him the sobriquet "Mad Dog."

In 1996, the president of the International Court of Justice appointed Owen to act as presiding arbitrator of the Arbitral Tribunal for the Dispute Over the Inter-Entity Boundary in the Brcko Area, a special ICJ tribunal established to determine the status of the Brcko District, which had not been resolved by the Dayton Agreement. As presiding arbitrator, Owen ruled that the Brcko District would constitute a Condominium (international law) under the direct jurisdiction of the federal authorities of Bosnia and Herzegovina and outside the jurisdiction of either the Republika Srpska or the Federation of Bosnia and Herzegovina. As the result of Owen's decision, the Brcko District became largely self-governing.

While some aspects of Owen's arbitral decision in the Brcko Arbitration have been characterized as controversial, one former American diplomat opined that Owen's "solution to the impasse over Brcko's political status will surely go down in the annals of peacemaking as one of its finer moments."

In another role as international arbitrator, the Republic of Venezuela appointed Owen in 1996 as one of three arbitrators for a proceeding administered by the International Centre for Settlement of Investment Disputes to resolve an investor-state dispute against the Republic.

Owen died at his home in Washington, D.C., on March 10, 2016. As the Presiding Arbitrator of the Arbitral Tribunal for Dispute over the Inter-Entity Boundary in Brčko Area, he was succeeded by John Clint Williamson (appointment made by International Court of Justice President Ronny Abraham)

Legal offices
Preceded by Herbert J. Hansell	Legal Adviser of the Department of State; October 4, 1979 – February 16, 1981	Succeeded by Davis Rowland Robinson
