= Monroe Leigh =

American political scientist

12th Legal Adviser of the Department of State
- In office January 21, 1975 – January 20, 1977
- Preceded by: Carlyle E. Maw
- Succeeded by: Herbert J. Hansell

Personal details
- Born: 1919 Halifax, Virginia, U.S.
- Died: 27 November 2001 (aged 81–82)
- Education: Hampden-Sydney College; University of Virginia

Monroe Leigh (1919– 27 November 2001) was a prominent American political philosopher and diplomat. He was born in Halifax, Virginia, in 1919. He graduated from Hampden-Sydney College in 1940 and earned a law degree from the University of Virginia, serving as editor of the Virginia Law Review. His time in law school was interrupted by service in the Army Air Forces during World War II.

He served as a legal adviser for the United States Defense Department and was picked by Henry Kissinger to serve as Legal Adviser of the Department of State 1975-1977. He was also NATO mission envoy, and president of the American Society of International Law.

He was a prolific writer on the subject of international law, with his criticism of the United States' refusal to sign the Rome Statute of the International Criminal Court being published in 2000, the year before he died.

== See also ==
- International Criminal Court
- United States and the International Criminal Court

Legal offices
Preceded by Carlyle E. Maw	Legal Adviser of the Department of State; January 21, 1975 – January 20, 1977	Succeeded by Herbert J. Hansell
