= Legal Adviser of the United States Department of State =

U.S. government position

- Seal of the United States Department of State
- Incumbent; Brock Dahl since June 15, 2026
- Reports to: United States Secretary of State
- Inaugural holder: Green Hackworth
- Formation: 1931
- Website: Official Website

The legal adviser of the Department of State is a position within the United States Department of State. The legal adviser provides legal advice on all issues (domestic and international) arising in the course of the department's activities. The legal adviser heads the State Department's Office of the Legal Adviser. As such, the legal adviser has the rank of Assistant Secretary.

== History ==
From 1870 to 1891, the examiner of claims had been the chief legal officer of the department. The solicitor, a Department of Justice employee, had functioned as the Department of State's chief legal officer from 1891 to 1931. Solicitors and examiners of claims were by statute officials of the Department of Justice. The position of Legal Advisor was created by an Act of Congress on February 23, 1931 (P.L. 71-715; 46 Stat. 1214). The first legal adviser was Green Hackworth, who served until 1946 and then became a judge on the International Court of Justice.

== List of legal advisers of the Department of State ==
| # | Name | Assumed office | Left office | President served under |
|---|---|---|---|---|
| 1 | Green Hackworth | July 1, 1931 | March 1, 1946 | Franklin D. Roosevelt and Harry S. Truman |
| 2 | Charles H. Fahy | June 19, 1946 | August 15, 1947 | Harry S. Truman |
| 3 | Ernest A. Gross | August 16, 1947 | March 3, 1949 | Harry S. Truman |
| 4 | Adrian S. Fisher | June 28, 1949 | January 27, 1953 | Harry S. Truman |
| 5 | Herman Phleger | February 2, 1953 | April 1, 1957 | Dwight D. Eisenhower |
| 6 | Loftus E. Becker Sr. | June 13, 1957 | August 15, 1959 | Dwight D. Eisenhower |
| 7 | Eric H. Hager | September 9, 1959 | January 20, 1961 | Dwight D. Eisenhower |
| 8 | Abram Chayes | February 6, 1961 | June 27, 1964 | John F. Kennedy |
| 9 | Leonard C. Meeker | May 18, 1965 | July 13, 1969 | Lyndon B. Johnson |
| 10 | John Reese Stevenson | July 14, 1969 | January 1, 1973 | Richard Nixon |
| 11 | Carlyle E. Maw | November 27, 1973 | July 9, 1974 | Richard Nixon |
| 12 | Monroe Leigh | January 21, 1975 | January 20, 1977 | Gerald Ford |
| 13 | Herbert J. Hansell | April 8, 1977 | September 20, 1979 | Jimmy Carter |
| 14 | Roberts Bishop Owen | October 4, 1979 | February 16, 1981 | Jimmy Carter |
| 15 | Davis Rowland Robinson | July 30, 1981 | February 27, 1985 | Ronald Reagan |
| 16 | Abraham David Sofaer | June 10, 1985 | June 15, 1990 | Ronald Reagan and George H. W. Bush |
| 17 | Edwin D. Williamson | September 20, 1990 | January 20, 1993 | George H. W. Bush |
| 18 | Conrad K. Harper | May 24, 1993 | June 30, 1996 | Bill Clinton |
| 19 | David Andrews | September 2, 1997 | April 25, 2000 | Bill Clinton |
| 20 | William Howard Taft IV | April 16, 2001 | March 1, 2005 | George W. Bush |
| 21 | John B. Bellinger III | April 6, 2005 | March 23, 2009 | George W. Bush, Barack Obama |
| - | Joan E. Donoghue (acting) | March 23, 2009 | June 25, 2009 | Barack Obama |
| 22 | Harold Hongju Koh | June 25, 2009 | January 22, 2013 | Barack Obama |
| - | Mary McLeod (acting) | January 23, 2013 | February 1, 2016 | Barack Obama |
| 23 | Brian Egan | February 2, 2016 | January 20, 2017 | Barack Obama |
| - | Richard C. Visek (acting) | January 20, 2017 | January 22, 2018 | Donald Trump |
| 24 | Jennifer Gillian Newstead | January 22, 2018 | May 31, 2019 | Donald Trump |
| - | Marik String (acting) | June 1, 2019 | January 20, 2021 | Donald Trump |
| - | Richard C. Visek (acting) | January 20, 2021 | September 24, 2024 | Joe Biden |
| 25 | Margaret L. Taylor | September 24, 2024 | January 20, 2025 | Joe Biden |
| - | Richard C. Visek (acting) | January 20, 2025 | March 29, 2025 | Donald Trump |
| - | Joshua Simmons (acting) | March 29, 2025 | May 26, 2025 | Donald Trump |
| 26 | Reed D. Rubinstein | May 26, 2025 | June 15, 2026 | Donald Trump |
| 27 | Brock Dahl | June 15, 2026 | Present | Donald Trump |
