= Treaty of Amity, Economic Relations and Consular Rights =

1955 non-aggression and trading pact between the U.S. and Pahlavi-dynasty Iran

عهدنامه مودت و روابط اقتصادی و حقوق کنسولی بین ایران و ایالات متحده آمریکا (Persian)
- Context: "There shall be firm and enduring peace and sincere friendship between the United States of America and Iran."
- Signed: August 15, 1955
- Location: Tehran
- Effective: June 16, 1957
- Expiration: October 3, 2019 (de facto)
- Signatories: (United States) Dwight D. Eisenhower (United States) Selden Chapin (Pahlavi Iran) Mohammed Reza Pahlavi (Pahlavi Iran) Hosein Ala' (Pahlavi Iran) Mostafa Samiy
- Parties: United States; Iran
- Languages: English; Persian

The Treaty of Amity, Economic Relations and Consular Rights between the United States and Iran was signed in Tehran on August 15, 1955, received the consent of the U.S. Senate on July 11, 1956 and entered into force on 16 June 1957. The treaty is registered by the United States to the United Nations on 20 December 1957. The official texts are in English and Persian. It is sealed by plenipotentiaries Selden Chapin (U.S.) and Mostafa Samiy (Iran). The Treaty has served as the jurisdictional basis for various international legal disputes between the United States and Iran, including the International Court of Justice (ICJ) cases Oil Platforms and Alleged Violations of the 1955 Treaty of Amity, Economic Relations and Consular Rights. In October 2018, the United States provided notice that it would be withdrawing from the Treaty following Iran's use of the Treaty as a basis to challenge the U.S. imposition of sanctions under the Joint Comprehensive Plan of Action (JCPOA) in the Alleged Violations case.

== Background ==
After the 1953 Coup in Iran, the United States and Iran began negotiations on a treaty of amity between them. This treaty was completed in 1955 and signed by Dwight Eisenhower and Hossein Ala. During the Iran hostage crisis that began in 1979 following the Iranian Revolution, the United States imposed sanctions on Iran that were in violation of Article 1 of the treaty, but Iran did not invoke the treaty. The United States would eventually invoke the treaty stating that Iran violated Article 2, Clause 4 of the treaty, which provides for the protection for citizens of either country. The International Court of Justice (ICJ) ruled in the favor of the United States. During the aftermath of the shooting down of Iran Air Flight 655 Iran sued the United States in the ICJ, with the case being settled out of court. In 1992, in response to Operation Nimble Archer, Iran would again take the United States to court. In this case the ICJ would rule that while the attacks on Iran were not justified, the United States was not in violation of the treaty.

== Terms ==
Article 1 simply states: "There shall be firm and enduring peace and sincere friendship between the United States of America and Iran." Article 2 provides for the protection and freedom of travel for citizens of either nation when visiting the other.

Article 3 provides for the recognition and access to the court systems for corporations within either territory. Article 4 establishes for the protection of property for nationals and corporations of either nation. Article 5 establishes that nationals and corporations may purchase or lease property within either territory. Article 6 establishes rules for taxation, including that nationals and corporations shall pay taxes, and that a scheme will be established to avoid double taxation.

Article 7 states that neither nation will apply monetary restrictions on each other except as needed "to assure the availability of foreign exchange for payments for goods and services essential to the health and welfare of its people" or as approved by the International Monetary Fund. Article 8 establishes rules for the import and export of products between both nations. Article 9 continues this with further rules for the import and export of products between the nations. Article 10 establishes freedom of commerce and navigation between both nations. Article 11 states that corporations acting within either territory shall not be discriminated against during government contract based on their country of origin.

Articles 12, 13, and 14 allow for the exchange of diplomats between the nations and the fair treatment of those diplomats. Article 15 allows each government to purchase or lease land within the other's borders as needed for any purpose other than the military. Articles 16 and 17 outlines that diplomats shall not be subjected to taxation, unless they are or have been a citizen of both nations. Article 18 outlines diplomatic immunity. Article 19 discusses the rights of nationals to visit their consulate. Article 20 outlines areas where the treaty does not apply.

Article 21 states that any disputes shall be subject to the rulings of the International Court of Justice. Article 22 names the previous treaties that this treaty is meant to replace. Article 23 gives a timeline for ratification of the treaty and allows for its cancellation by either party after 10 years "by giving one year's written notice".

== Termination ==
In May 2018, the United States withdrew from the Joint Comprehensive Plan of Action leading to sanctions being re-imposed against Iran. On 3 October 2018, following an earlier ruling that day by the International Court of Justice in the case Islamic Republic of Iran v. United States of America (Alleged Violations of the 1955 Treaty of Amity, Economic Relations and Consular Rights) that the US had violated the treaty by imposing sanctions on Iran, United States Secretary of State Mike Pompeo said that the United States "is terminating" the treaty. Mike Pompeo has said that the decision to end the treaty "is 39 years overdue". In response foreign minister Mohammad Javad Zarif called the Trump administration an "outlaw regime" and Supreme Leader of Iran Ali Khamenei stated "America must receive another slap from the people of Iran with the defeat of sanctions".

== See also ==
- 1953 Iranian coup d'état
- United States withdrawal from the Joint Comprehensive Plan of Action
