= Reed D. Rubinstein =

American politician and lawyer

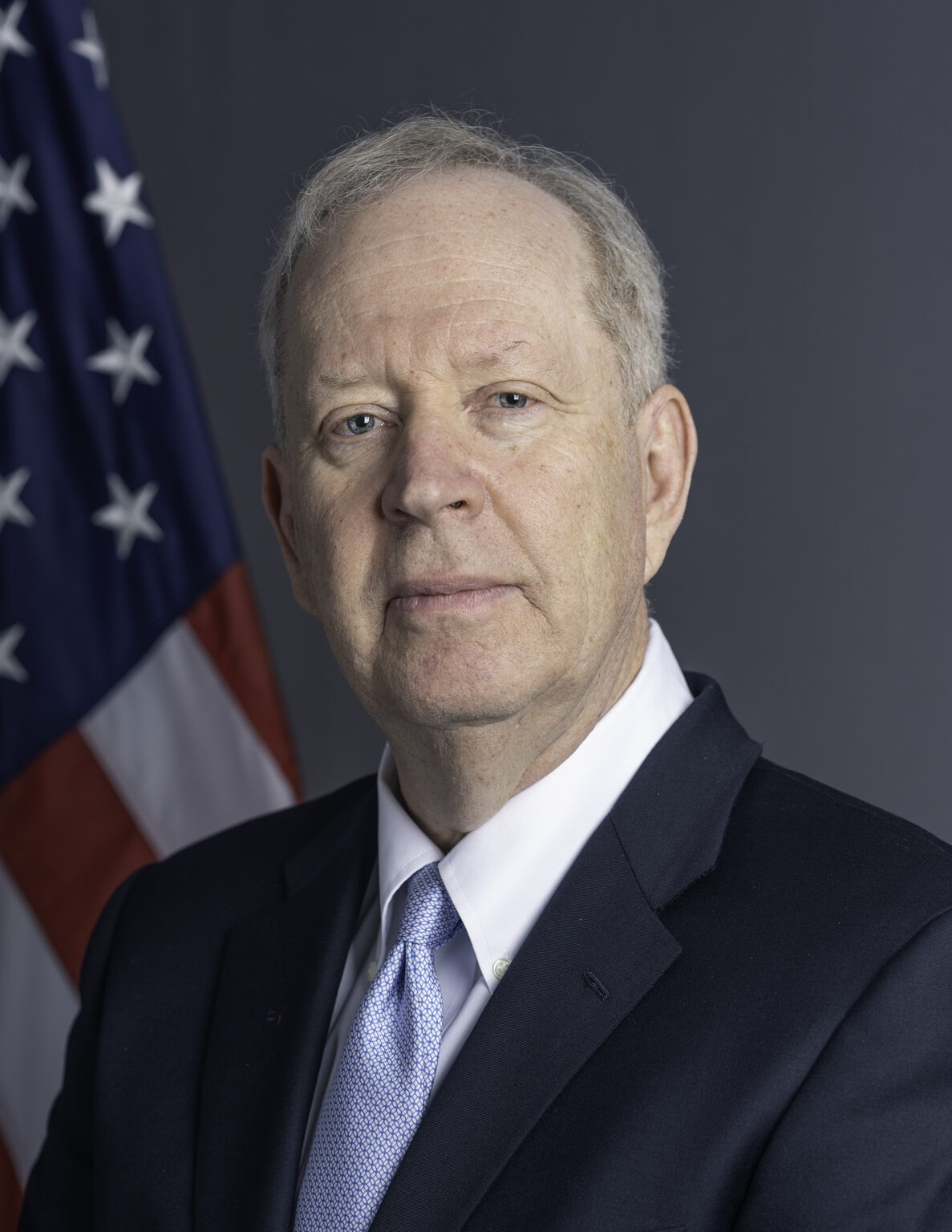
- 2025 Official Portrait

Legal Adviser of the Department of State
- In office May 26, 2025 – June 15, 2026
- President: Donald Trump
- Preceded by: Margaret L. Taylor
- Succeeded by: Brock Dahl

Personal details
- Education: University of Michigan Law School

Reed D. Rubinstein is an American attorney who served as the Legal Adviser of the Department of State from 2025 to 2026 under the second Trump administration. First being appointed as vice president of America First Legal in 2024, he was appointed as the Legal Adviser in May 2025.

== Education ==
Rubinstein is a 1985 Graduate of the University of Michigan Law School, where he has studied and practised law.

== Career ==
Rubinstein became the senior counsel and regulatory committee executive at the U.S. Chamber of Commerce in March 2012. He joined the Donald Trump 2016 presidential campaign in February 2016.

Rubinstein was appointed the vice president of America First Legal in February 2024.

On May 15, 2025, the U.S. Senate confirmed Rubinstein as Legal Adviser of the Department of State by a 51–46 vote. On June 15, 2026, Rubinstein's term ended. He was succeeded by Brock Dahl.
