= Alleged Violations of the 1955 Treaty of Amity (Iran v. United States) =

2023 International Court of Justice case

Alleged Violations of the 1955 Treaty of Amity, Economic Relations, and Consular Rights (Islamic Republic of Iran v. United States of America)
- Court: International Court of Justice
- Decided: 3 October 2018; 3 February 2021; 30 March 2023

Case opinions
- https://www.icj-cij.org/en/case/175

Alleged Violations of the 1955 Treaty of Amity, Economic Relations, and Consular Rights (Islamic Republic of Iran v. United States of America) is the formal name of a case in the International Court of Justice (ICJ).

On 16 July 2018, Iran filed a lawsuit against the United States, mainly based on the 1955 Treaty of Amity before the Iranian Revolution. Iran alleged that reimposing the nuclear sanctions was a violation of the treaty. Iran also filed request for provisional measures. In response, the United States alleged that the lawsuit was baseless.

On 3 October 2018, the court issued provisional measures ordering the United States to "lift sanctions linked to humanitarian goods and civil aviation".

On 23 August 2019, the United States raised preliminary objections to the jurisdiction of the court and the admissibility of the application. In accordance with procedure, the proceedings on the merits of the case were then suspended.

On 3 February 2021, the court rejected the preliminary objections of the United States, finding that it had jurisdiction on the case.

On 30 March 2023, the court released its final judgement on the merits, siding with Iran on frozen commercial assets, but not on $1.75 billion of frozen central bank assets, which constituted most of the dispute.

== Background ==
Long before Iran's Islamic Revolution in 1979, Iran and the United States signed the Treaty of Amity which was meant to provide "a basis for friendly diplomatic exchanges and economic relations."

In 2018, U.S. President Donald Trump withdrew from the Joint Comprehensive Plan of Action (JCPOA) between the United States, European Union, Russia, China, and Iran to address Iran's nuclear programs. Under the JCPOA, some of the sanctions against Iran were lifted in exchange for Tehran accepting some limitations on its nuclear program. Following withdrawal from the JCPOA, the United States announced "unilateral plans" to re-impose sanctions against Iran. The Iranian government believed that the United States' decision on 8 May 2018, to re-impose nuclear sanctions on Iran was a violation of the United States' international obligations, "especially articles 4, 7, 8, 9, 10" of the JCPOA and the Treaty of Amity. Consequently, Iran filed a lawsuit with the International Court of Justice on 16 July 2018. In response, the U.S. government announced its withdrawal from the Treaty of Amity with Iran, which requires "giving one year's written notice" according to the treaty itself. The act was criticized by Mohammad Javad Zarif.

== 2018 Provisional Measures Order ==
On 3 October 2018, the ICJ issued a provisional measures order, requiring the United States to lift certain restrictions to ensure access to "humanitarian trade, food, medicine and civil aviation." "On humanitarian grounds, the US must remove by means of its choosing any impediment to the free exportation to Iran of goods involving humanitarian concerns," said the United Nations court's verdict on 3 October 2018. Mohammad Javad Zarif, the Iranian Foreign Minister, hailed the ruling and described it as "a victory for the rule of law."

== 2023 Judgement on Merits ==
On March 30, 2023, the ICJ released its final judgement on the merits of the case. The court found that they had no jurisdiction over the assets held by Bank Markazi, Iran's central bank, because it was not a commercial enterprise and therefore it was not covered under the 1955 Treaty of Amity. This represented a majority of the funds in question. However, the court also ruled that the US had violated the treaty in other ways by seizing assets. US Spokesperson Vedant Patel said he believed the decision was "a major blow to Iran." However, the Iranian Foreign Ministry said that the ruling was proof of "Iran’s righteousness and the violations by the US government."
