= Kasikili/Sedudu Island case =

ICJ border dispute between Botswana and Namibia

Kasikili/Sedudu Island
- Court: International Court of Justice
- Full case name: Kasikili/Sedudu Island (Botswana/Namibia)
- Started: May 17, 1996
- Decided: December 13, 1999
- Citations: Kasikili/Sedudu Island (Botswana/Namibia), Judgment, I.C.J. Reports 1999, p. 1045

Court membership
- Judges sitting: Stephen M. Schwebel, Christopher Weeramantry, Shigeru Oda, Mohammed Bedjaoui, Gilbert Guillaume, Raymond Ranjeva, Géza Herczegh, Shi Jiuyong, Carl-August Fleischhauer, Abdul Koroma, Vladlen Vereshchetin, Rosalyn Higgins, Gonzalo Parra-Aranguren, Pieter Kooijmans, Francisco Rezek

Case opinions
- Dissent: Judge Weeramantry
- Dissent: Judge Fleischhauer
- Dissent: Judge Parra-Aranguren
- Dissent: Judge Rezek

Area of law
- Public international law

The Case concerning Kasikili/Sedudu Island (Botswana/Namibia) was a case before the International Court of Justice (ICJ) which concerned a territorial dispute over Sedudu Island. The court ruled in 1999 that the island was Botswana territory.

== Territorial dispute ==
The dispute arose because of the imprecise wording of the agreement concerning the northern boundary between the colonial powers of Germany and the United Kingdom which settled the geographic interests between German South-West Africa and the Bechuanaland Protectorate in the Heligoland-Zanzibar Treaty signed on July 1, 1890. This treaty read "in Southwest Africa, Germany's sphere of influence is demarcated thus":

To the east by the line that commences at the aforementioned point and follows the 20th degree of east longitude to its intersection point with the 22nd degree of south latitude. The line then traces this degree of latitude eastward to its intersection with the 21st degree of east longitude, follows this degree of longitude northward to its intersection with the 18th degree of south latitude, runs along this degree of latitude eastward to its intersection with the Chobe River. Here it descends the thalweg of the main channel until it meets the Zambezi, where it ends. It is understood that under this arrangement Germany shall be granted free access from its protectorate to the Zambezi by means of a strip of land not less than twenty English miles [30 km] wide at any point. Great Britain's sphere of influence is bounded to the west and northwest by the previously described line and includes Lake Ngami.

The present country of Namibia was German South West Africa in 1890; Botswana was then known as the Bechuanaland Protectorate.

== Initiation of proceedings ==
Namibia and Botswana reached a Special Agreement in 1996 to resolve their dispute by taking it to the ICJ. Under the terms of the Special Agreement, the two countries asked the Court to "determine, on the basis of the Anglo-German Treaty of 1 July 1890 and the rules and principles of international law, the boundary between Namibia and Botswana around Kasikili/Sedudu Island and the legal status of the island". The parties transmitted the agreement to the Court by a joint letter dated May 17, 1996.

== Decision of the Court ==
According to the text of the 1890 Treaty, Great Britain and Germany located the dividing line between their spheres of influence in the "main channel" of the Chobe River. The real dispute between the countries concerned the location of that "main channel", with Botswana contending that it was the channel running north of Sedudu Island and Namibia saying the channel ran south of the island. However, since the 1890 Treaty did not define the notion of "main channel", the Court itself had to determine which was the main channel of the Chobe River around the island.

To do so, the Court took into consideration the depth and the width of the channel, the flow (i.e., the volume of water carried), the bed profile configuration and the navigability of the channel. After considering the figures submitted by both parties, as well as surveys carried out on the ground at different periods, the Court concluded that "the northern channel of the River Chobe around Kasikili/Sedudu Island must be regarded as its main channel".

The Court stated that it could not draw conclusions from the cartographic material "[i]n view of the absence of any map officially reflecting the intentions of the parties to the 1890 Treaty" and "in the light of the uncertainty and inconsistency" of the maps submitted by Botswana and Namibia.

The Court considered Namibia's alternative argument that it (and its predecessors) had prescriptive title to Kasikili/Sedudu Island by virtue of the exercise of sovereign jurisdiction over it since the beginning of the century, with full knowledge and acceptance by the authorities of Botswana (and its predecessors). The Court found that while the Subia people of the Caprivi Strip (territory belonging to Namibia) did indeed use the island for many years, they did so intermittently, according to the seasons, and for exclusively agricultural purposes, without it being established that they occupied the island exercising functions of state authority there on behalf of the Zambezi authorities. The Court therefore rejected this argument.

After concluding that the boundary between Botswana and Namibia around Kasikili/Sedudu Island follows the line of deepest soundings in the northern channel of the Chobe and that the island formed part of the territory of Botswana, the Court recalled that, under the terms of an agreement concluded in May 1992 (the "Kasane Communiqué"), the two countries had undertaken to one another that there shall be unimpeded navigation for craft of their nationals and flags in the channels around the island.
