= Ligitan and Sipadan dispute =

Territorial dispute between Indonesia and Malaysia

Sovereignty over Ligitan and Sipadan Islands (Indonesia v. Malaysia)
- Court: International Court of Justice
- Decided: 17 December 2002
- Citation: General List No. 102
- Transcript: Written proceedings

Court membership
- Judges sitting: Gilbert Guillaume, Shi Jiuyong, Shigeru Oda, Raymond Ranjeva, Géza Herczegh, Carl-August Fleischhauer, Abdul Koroma, Vladlen Stepanovich Vereshcheti, Rosalyn Higgins, Gonzalo Parra-Aranguren, Pieter Kooijmans, Francisco Rezek, Awn Shawkat Al-Khasawneh, Thomas Buergenthal, Nabil Elaraby, Thomas Franck (ad hoc judge appointed by Indonesia) and Christopher Weeramantry (ad hoc judge appointed by Malaysia)

Case opinions
- ICJ awarded both islands to Malaysia based on "effective occupation"

The Ligitan and Sipadan dispute [2002] ICJ 3 was a territorial dispute between Indonesia and Malaysia over two islands in the Celebes Sea, namely Ligitan and Sipadan. The dispute began in 1969 and was largely resolved by the International Court of Justice (ICJ) in 2002, which opined that both of the islands belonged to Malaysia.

== Background ==
Ligitan and Sipadan are two small islands located in the Celebes Sea off the southeastern coast of the Malaysian state of Sabah. Sovereignty over the islands has been disputed by Indonesia and Malaysia since 1969 and intensified in 1991 when Indonesia discovered that Malaysia had built some tourist facilities on Sipadan island. Indonesia claimed that it had made a verbal agreement with Malaysia in 1969 to discuss the question of sovereignty over the islands. Malaysia however denied the allegation of an agreement between them, maintaining that the islands have always been part of the territory of its state of Sabah. Both countries have not delimited their maritime zones in the area and the court was not asked to rule on this further matter. On 2 November 1998, both countries agreed to bring the matter to the International Court of Justice (ICJ).

=== Government of the Philippines request for intervention ===
The Philippines had applied during the proceedings to intervene over the case on the basis of their claim to northern Borneo. According to the Philippine side, the heirs of the Sultan of Sulu has ceded their rights over North Borneo (present-day Sabah) to the Philippines in 1962. However, a majority of people in the territory chose to become part of Malaysia in 1963 rather than the Philippines under a plebiscite organised by the United Nations. The Philippines motive to intervene was questioned by the court, as to whether the Philippines had a "sufficiently strong legal interest" with both Indonesia and Malaysia. The court strongly rejected the Philippines' attempt of intervention and in doing so cited that the request made by the Philippines did not relate to the subject matter of the case. The Philippines query was totally dismissed in June 2001 when after oral hearings the court voted it down by a count of fourteen votes to one.

== Court decision ==
Both islands were originally considered to be terra nullius. However, the United Kingdom when it held sovereignty over Malaya, had significantly developed the islands unlike the Dutch East Indies, Indonesia's predecessor - Britain had demonstrated effective occupation. The Court used that fact, known as the effectivites principle as the main reason for awarding the islands to Malaysia. In addition, it is also acknowledged both of the islands were much closer to Malaysia than Indonesia as well with an earliest documentation from Malaysia over the British 1878 Agreement with the Sultanate of Sulu during which time they acquired the Sultanate area as part of the British Borneo, while the Indonesian claim is mostly based on an 1891 Boundary Treaty between Great Britain and the Netherlands.

== See also ==
- Foreign relations of Indonesia
- Foreign relations of Malaysia
- List of International Court of Justice cases
- Indonesia–Malaysia border
