= Advisory Opinion on the Legality of the Threat or Use of Nuclear Weapons =

1996 International Court of Justice case

Legality of the Use by a State of Nuclear Weapons in Armed Conflict
- Emblem of the International Court of Justice
- Court: International Court of Justice
- Full case name: Legality of the Threat or Use of Nuclear Weapons - Advisory Opinion of 8 July 1996
- Decided: 8 July 1996
- Citations: [1996] ICJ 3, ICJ Reports 1996, p 226;

Case history
- Prior actions: Denial of initial request for opinion submitted by the WHO [1996] ICJ 2, ICJ Reports 1996, p 66;

Court membership
- Judges sitting: Bedjaoui (President), Schwebel (Vice President), Oda, Guillaume, Shahabuddeen, Weeramantry, Ranjeva, Herczegh, Shi, Flesichhauer, Koroma, Vereshchetin, Ferrari Bravo, Higgins

Case opinions
- There is no specific authorization of the threat or use of nuclear weapons nor is there any comprehensive and universal prohibition of the threat or use of nuclear weapons as such. A threat or use of nuclear weapons contrary to the United Nations Charter is unlawful and such a threat or use should be compatible with the requirements of the international law of armed conflicts and nuclear weapons treaties. Therefore, the threat or use of nuclear weapons would generally be contrary to international law applicable to armed conflicts, particularly humanitarian law, however, the Court cannot conclude whether the threat or use of nuclear weapons would be lawful or unlawful in an extreme circumstance of self-defence, in which the very survival of a State would be at stake. There exists an obligation to pursue nuclear disarmament in all its aspects.
- Decision by: Court
- Concur/dissent: Guillaume, Ranjeva, Fleischhauer
- Dissent: Schwebel, Oda, Shahabudeen, Weeramantry, Koroma, Higgins

Keywords
- nuclear weapons; international humanitarian law; UN Charter; International Covenant on Civil and Political Rights; Genocide Convention; nuclear non-proliferation; right of self-defence; deterrence

Legality of the Threat or Use of Nuclear Weapons [1996] ICJ 3 is a landmark international law case, where the International Court of Justice gave an advisory opinion stating that while the threat or use of nuclear weapons would generally be contrary to international humanitarian law, it cannot be concluded whether or not such a threat or use of nuclear weapons would be lawful in extreme circumstances where the very survival of a state would be at stake. The Court held that there is no source of international law that explicitly authorises or prohibits the threat or use of nuclear weapons but such threat or use must be in conformity with the UN Charter and principles of international humanitarian law. The Court also concluded that there was a general obligation to pursue nuclear disarmament.

The World Health Organization requested the opinion on 3 September 1993, but it was initially refused because the WHO was acting outside its legal capacity (ultra vires). The United Nations General Assembly requested another opinion in December 1994, which was accepted by the Court in January 1995. As well as determining the illegality of nuclear weapon use, the court discussed the proper role of international judicial bodies, the ICJ's advisory function, international humanitarian law (jus in bello), and rules governing the use of force (jus ad bellum). It explored the status of "Lotus approach", and employed the concept of non liquet. There were also strategic questions such as the legality of the practice of nuclear deterrence or the meaning of Article VI of the 1968 Treaty on the Non-Proliferation of Nuclear Weapons.

The possibility of outlawing the use of nuclear weapons in an armed conflict was raised on 30 June 1950, by the Dutch representative to the International Law Commission (ILC), Jean Pierre Adrien François, who suggested this "would in itself be an advance". In addition, the Polish government requested this issue to be examined by the ILC as a crime against the peace of mankind. However, the issue was delayed during the Cold War.

The New START treaty was an agreement by both the US and Russian governments to limit the deploying of nuclear ballistic missiles. Signed in 2010 and entering into force on February 5, 2011, the treaty was extended in 2021 for another five years before officially expiring on February 5, 2026.

== Request of the World Health Organization ==
The original advisory opinion was requested by the World Health Organization in 1993.

An advisory opinion on this issue was originally requested by the World Health Organization (WHO) on 3 September 1993:

In view of the health and environmental effects, would the use of nuclear weapons by a state in war or other armed conflict be a breach of its obligations under international law including the WHO Constitution?

The ICJ considered the WHO's request, in a case known as the Legality of the Use by a State of Nuclear Weapons in Armed Conflict (General List No. 93), and also known as the WHO Nuclear Weapons case, between 1993 and 1996. The ICJ fixed 10 June 1994 as the time limit for written submissions, but after receiving many written and oral submissions, later extended this date to 20 September 1994. After considering the case the Court refused to give an advisory opinion on the WHO question. On 8 July 1996 it held, by 11 votes to three, that the question did not fall within the scope of WHO's activities, as is required by Article 96(2) of the UN Charter.

== Request of the UN General Assembly ==
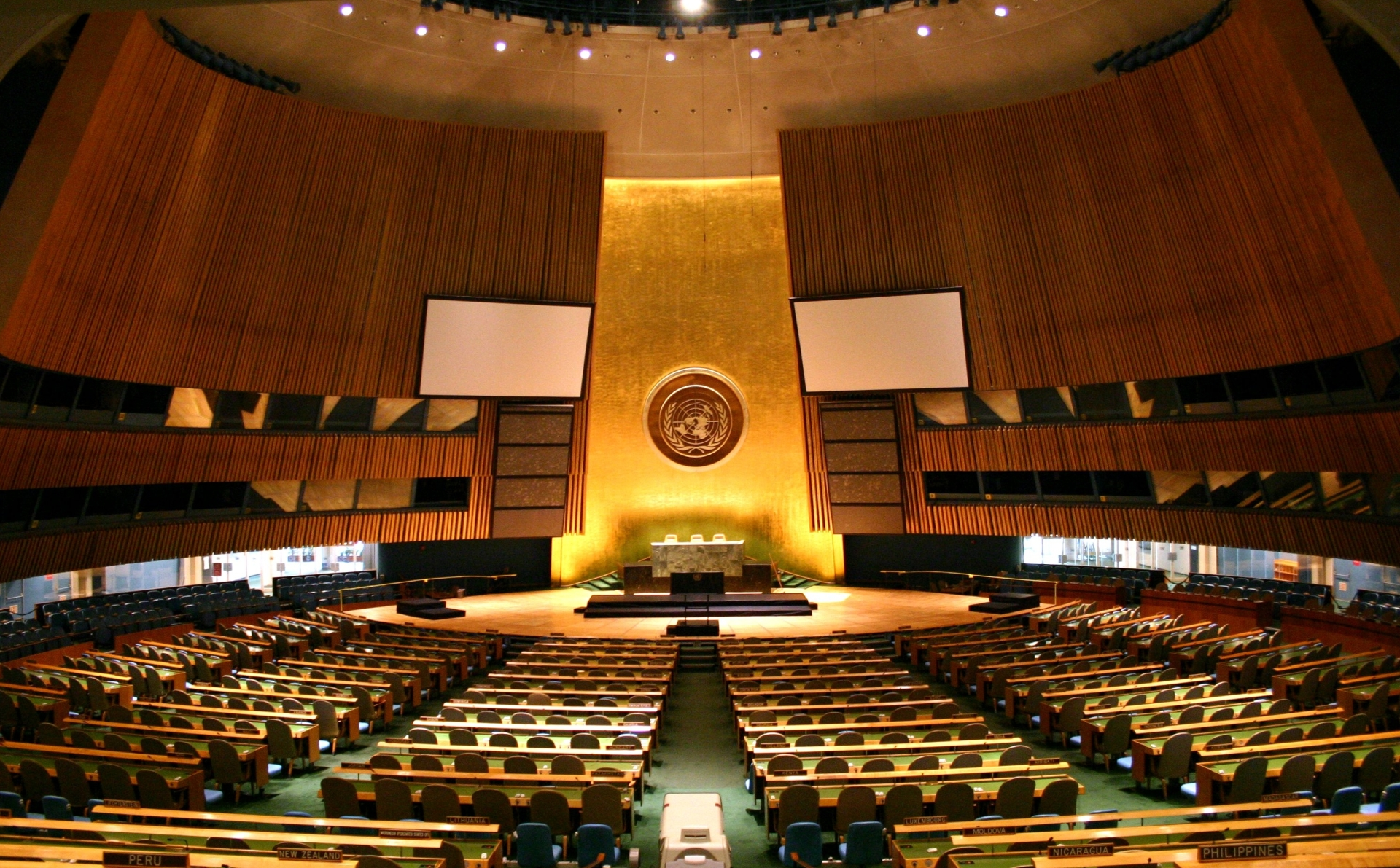
UN General Assembly.

On 15 December 1994 the UN General Assembly adopted resolution A/RES/49/75K. This asked the ICJ urgently to render its advisory opinion on the following question:

Is the threat or use of nuclear weapons in any circumstances permitted under international law?

— United Nations General Assembly

The resolution, submitted to the Court on 19 December 1994, was adopted by 78 states voting in favour, 43 against, 38 abstaining and 26 not voting.

The General Assembly had considered asking a similar question in the autumn of 1993, at the instigation of the Non-Aligned Movement (NAM), which ultimately did not push its request that year. NAM was more willing the following year, in the face of written statements submitted in the WHO proceedings from a number of nuclear-weapon states indicating strong views to the effect that the WHO lacked competence in the matter. The Court subsequently fixed 20 June 1995 as the filing date for written statements.

Altogether, 42 states participated in the written phase of the pleadings, the largest number ever to join in proceedings before the Court. Of the five declared nuclear weapon states (the P5), only the People's Republic of China did not participate. Of the three "threshold" nuclear-weapon states, only India participated. Many of the participants were developing states which had not previously contributed to proceedings before the ICJ, a reflection perhaps of the unparalleled interest in this matter and the growing willingness of developing states to engage in international judicial proceedings in the "post-colonial" period.

Oral hearings were held from 30 October to 15 November 1995. Twenty-two states participated: Australia, Egypt, France, Germany, Indonesia, Mexico, Iran, Italy, Japan, Malaysia, New Zealand, Philippines, Qatar, Russian Federation, San Marino, Samoa, Marshall Islands, Solomon Islands, Costa Rica, United Kingdom, United States, Zimbabwe; as did the WHO. The secretariat of the UN did not appear, but filed with the Court a dossier explaining the history of resolution 49/75K. Each state was allocated 90 minutes to make its statement. On 8 July 1996, nearly eight months after the close of the oral phase, the ICJ rendered its opinion.

== Decision of the International Court of Justice ==
=== Composition of the Court ===
The ICJ is composed of fifteen judges elected to nine year terms by the UN General Assembly and the UN Security Council. The court's "advisory opinion" can be requested only by specific United Nations organisations, and is inherently non-binding under the Statute of the court.

The fifteen judges asked to give their advisory opinion regarding the legality of the threat or use of nuclear weapons were:

President Mohammed Bedjaoui	Algeria
Vice-president Stephen M. Schwebel	United States
Judge Shigeru Oda	Japan
Judge Gilbert Guillaume	France
Judge Mohammed Shahabuddeen	Guyana
Judge Christopher Weeramantry	Sri Lanka
Judge Raymond Ranjeva	Madagascar
Judge Shi Jiuyong	China
Judge Carl-August Fleischhauer	Germany
Judge Abdul G. Koroma	Sierra Leone
Judge Géza Herczegh	Hungary
Judge Vladlen S. Vereschetin	Russia
Judge Luigi Ferrari Bravo	Italy
Judge Rosalyn Higgins	United Kingdom
Judge Andrés Aguilar Mawdsley (died before the decision)	Venezuela

Registrar Eduardo Valencia Ospina	Colombia

=== Court's analysis ===
==== Deterrence and "threat" ====
The court considered the matter of deterrence, which involves a threat to use nuclear weapons under certain circumstances on a potential enemy or an enemy. Was such a threat illegal? The court decided, with some judges dissenting, that, if a threatened retaliatory strike was consistent with military necessity and proportionality, it would not necessarily be illegal. (Judgement paragraphs 37–50)

==== The legality of the possession of nuclear weapons ====
The court then considered the legality of the possession, as opposed to actual use, of nuclear weapons. The Court looked at various treaties, including the UN Charter, and found no treaty language that specifically forbade the possession of nuclear weapons in a categorical way.

The UN Charter was examined in paragraphs 37–50 (paragraph 37: "The Court will now address the question of the legality or illegality of recourse to nuclear weapons in the light of the provisions of the Charter relating to the threat or use of force"). Paragraph 39 mentions: "These provisions [i.e. those of the Charter] do not refer to specific weapons. They apply to any use of force, regardless of the weapons employed. The Charter neither expressly prohibits, nor permits, the use of any specific weapon, including nuclear weapons. A weapon that is already unlawful per se, whether by treaty or custom, does not become lawful by reason of its being used for a legitimate purpose under the Charter."

Treaties were examined in paragraphs 53–63 (paragraph 53: "The Court must therefore now examine whether there is any prohibition of recourse to nuclear weapons as such; it will first ascertain whether there is a conventional prescription to this effect"), as part of the law applicable in situations of armed conflict (paragraph 51, first sentence: "Having dealt with the Charter provisions relating to the threat or use of force, the Court will now turn to the law applicable in situations of armed conflict"). In particular, with respect to "the argument [that] has been advanced that nuclear weapons should be treated in the same way as poisoned weapons", the Court concluded that "it does not seem to the Court that the use of nuclear weapons can be regarded as specifically prohibited on the basis of the [...] provisions of the Second Hague Declaration of 1899, the Regulations annexed to the Hague Convention IV of 1907 or the 1925 Protocol" (paragraphs 54 and 56)". It was also argued by some that the Hague Conventions concerning the use of bacteriological or chemical weapons would also apply to nuclear weapons, but the Court was unable to adopt this argument ("The Court does not find any specific prohibition of recourse to nuclear weapons in treaties expressly prohibiting the use of certain weapons of mass destruction", paragraph 57 in fine).

With respect to treaties that "deal [...] exclusively with acquisition, manufacture, possession, deployment and testing of nuclear weapons, without specifically addressing their threat or use," the Court notes that those treaties "certainly point to an increasing concern in the international community with these weapons; the Court concludes from this that these treaties could therefore be seen as foreshadowing a future general prohibition of the use of such weapons, but they do not constitute such a prohibition by themselves" (paragraph 62). Also, regarding regional treaties prohibiting recourse, namely those of Tlatelolco (Latin America) and Rarotonga (South Pacific) the Court notes that while those "testify to a growing awareness of the need to liberate the community of States and the international public from the dangers resulting from the existence of nuclear weapons", "[i]t [i.e. the Court] does not, however, view these elements as amounting to a comprehensive and universal conventional prohibition on the use, or the threat of use, of those weapons as such." (paragraph 63).

Customary international law also provided insufficient evidence that the possession of nuclear weapons had come to be universally regarded as illegal.

Ultimately, the court was unable to find an opinio juris (that is, legal consensus) that nuclear weapons are illegal to possess. (paragraph 65) However, in practice, nuclear weapons have not been used in war since 1945 and there have been numerous UN resolutions condemning their use (however, such resolutions are not universally supported—most notably, the nuclear powers object to them).(paragraph 68–73) The ICJ did not find that these facts demonstrated a new and clear customary law absolutely forbidding nuclear weapons.

However, there are many universal humanitarian laws applying to war. For instance, it is illegal for a combatant specifically to target civilians and certain types of weapons that cause indiscriminate damage are categorically outlawed. All states seem to observe these rules, making them a part of customary international law, so the court ruled that these laws would also apply to the use of nuclear weapons.(paragraph 86) The Court decided not to pronounce on the matter of whether the use of nuclear weapons might possibly be legal, if exercised as a last resort in extreme circumstances (such as if the very existence of the state was in jeopardy).(paragraph 97)

=== Decision ===
The court undertook seven separate votes, all of which were passed:

1. The court decided to comply with the request for an advisory opinion;
2. The court replied that "There is in neither customary nor conventional international law any specific authorization of the threat or use of nuclear weapons";
3. The court replied that "There is in neither customary nor conventional international law any comprehensive and universal prohibition of the threat or use of nuclear weapons as such";
4. The court replied that "A threat or use of force by means of nuclear weapons that is contrary to Article 2, paragraph 4, of the United Nations Charter and that fails to meet all the requirements of Article 51, is unlawful";
5. The court replied that "A threat or use of nuclear weapons should also be compatible with the requirements of the international law applicable in armed conflict, particularly those of the principles and rules of humanitarian law, as well as with specific obligations under treaties and other undertakings which expressly deal with nuclear weapons"
6. The court replied that "the threat or use of nuclear weapons would generally be contrary to the rules of international law applicable in armed conflict, and in particular the principles and rules of humanitarian law; However, in view of the current state of international law, and of the elements of fact at its disposal, the Court cannot conclude definitively whether the threat or use of nuclear weapons would be lawful or unlawful in an extreme circumstance of self-defence, in which the very survival of a State would be at stake"
7. The court replied that "There exists an obligation to pursue in good faith and bring to a conclusion negotiations leading to nuclear disarmament in all its aspects under strict and effective international control".

The court voted as follows:

Judge	UN State	Vote 1	Vote 2	Vote 3	Vote 4	Vote 5	Vote 6	Vote 7
President Mohammed Bedjaoui	Algeria	For	For	For	For	For	For	For
Vice-president Stephen M. Schwebel	United States	For	For	For	For	For	Against	For
Judge Shigeru Oda	Japan	Against	For	For	For	For	Against	For
Judge Gilbert Guillaume	France	For	For	For	For	For	Against	For
Judge Mohamed Shahabuddeen	Guyana	For	For	Against	For	For	Against	For
Judge Christopher Weeramantry	Sri Lanka	For	For	Against	For	For	Against	For
Judge Raymond Ranjeva	Madagascar	For	For	For	For	For	For	For
Judge Shi Jiuyong	China	For	For	For	For	For	For	For
Judge Carl-August Fleischhauer	Germany	For	For	For	For	For	For	For
Judge Abdul G. Koroma	Sierra Leone	For	For	Against	For	For	Against	For
Judge Géza Herczegh	Hungary	For	For	For	For	For	For	For
Judge Vladlen S. Vereschetin	Russia	For	For	For	For	For	For	For
Judge Luigi Ferrari Bravo	Italy	For	For	For	For	For	For	For
Judge Rosalyn Higgins	United Kingdom	For	For	For	For	For	Against	For
Result (For–Against):		13–1	14–0	11–3	14–0	14–0	7–7	14–0

==== Split decision ====
The only significantly split decision was on the matter of whether "the threat or use of nuclear weapons would generally be contrary to the rules of international law applicable in armed conflict", not including "in an extreme circumstance of self-defence, in which the very survival of a State would be at stake". However, three of the seven "dissenting" judges (namely, Judge Shahabuddeen of Guyana, Judge Weeramantry of Sri Lanka, and Judge Koroma of Sierra Leone) wrote separate opinions explaining that the reason they were dissenting was their view that there is no exception under any circumstances (including that of ensuring the survival of a State) to the general principle that use of nuclear weapons is illegal. A fourth dissenter, Judge Oda of Japan, dissented largely on the ground that the Court simply should not have taken the case.

Vice President Schwebel remarked in his dissenting opinion that

It cannot be accepted that the use of nuclear weapons on a scale which would – or could – result in the deaths of many millions in indiscriminate inferno and by far-reaching fallout, have pernicious effects in space and time, and render uninhabitable much or all of the earth, could be lawful.

And Higgins noted that she did not

exclude the possibility that such a weapon could be unlawful by reference to the humanitarian law, if its use could never comply with its requirements.

Nevertheless, the Court's opinion did not conclude definitively and categorically, under the existing state of international law at the time, whether in an extreme circumstance of self-defence in which the very survival of a State would be a stake, the threat or use of nuclear weapons would necessarily be unlawful in all possible cases. However, the court's opinion unanimously clarified that the world's states have a binding duty to negotiate in good faith, and to accomplish, nuclear disarmament.

==== Unanimity ====
The unanimous decision on the obligation to negotiate complete nuclear disarmament followed on from the Court's majority finding that no specific prohibition of the use or threat of use already existed, although a body of international law made it clear that the use of nuclear weapons would be “scarcely reconcilable” with legal requirements. In the longer version of the Opinion, they wrote:

“ In the long run, international law, and with it the stability of the international order which it is intended to govern, are bound to suffer from the continuing difference of views with regard to the legal status of weapons as deadly as nuclear weapons. It is consequently important to put an end to this state of affairs: the long-promised complete nuclear disarmament appears to be the most appropriate means of achieving that result.”

This decision led to the concept of the 'legal gap' that, at a conference in 2014, Austria pledged to close. With a group of other states belonging to the Humanitarian Initiative, a UN process was initiated that ultimately led to the adoption of a UN Treaty on the Prohibition of Nuclear Weapons on 7 July 2017.

== International reaction ==
=== United Kingdom ===
The Government of the United Kingdom has announced plans to renew Britain's only nuclear weapon, the Trident missile system. They have published a white paper The Future of the United Kingdom's Nuclear Deterrent in which they state that the renewal is fully compatible with the United Kingdom's treaty commitments and international law. These arguments are summarised in a question and answer briefing published by UK Permanent Representative to the Conference on Disarmament

- Is Trident replacement legal under the Non Proliferation Treaty (NPT)? Renewal of the Trident system is fully consistent with our international obligations, including those on disarmament. ...
- Is retaining the deterrent incompatible with NPT Article VI? The NPT does not establish any timetable for nuclear disarmament. Nor does it prohibit maintenance or renewal of existing capabilities. Renewing the current Trident system is fully consistent with the NPT and with all our international legal obligations. ...

The white paper The Future of the United Kingdom's Nuclear Deterrent stands in contrast to two legal opinions. The first, commissioned by Peacerights, was given on 19 December 2005 by Rabinder Singh QC and Professor Christine Chinkin of Matrix Chambers. It addressed

whether Trident or a likely replacement to Trident breaches customary international law

Drawing on the International Court of Justice (ICJ) opinion, Singh and Chinkin argued that:

The use of the Trident system would breach customary international law, in particular because it would infringe the "intransgressible" [principles of international customary law] requirement that a distinction must be drawn between combatants and non-combatants.

The second legal opinion was commissioned by Greenpeace and given by Philippe Sands QC and Helen Law, also of Matrix Chambers, on 13 November 2006. The opinion addressed

The compatibility with international law, in particular the jus ad bellum, international humanitarian law (‘IHL’) and Article VI of the Treaty on the Non-Proliferation of Nuclear Weapons (‘NPT’), of the current UK strategy on the use of Trident...The compatibility with IHL of deploying the current Trident system...[and] the compatibility with IHL and Article VI NPT of the following options for replacing or upgrading Trident: (a) Enhanced targeting capability; (b) Increased yield flexibility; (c) Renewal of the current capability over a longer period.

With regards to the jus ad bellum, Sands and Law found that

Given the devastating consequences inherent in the use of the UK’s current nuclear weapons, we are of the view that the proportionality test is unlikely to be met except where there is a threat to the very survival of the state. In our view, the ‘vital interests’ of the UK as defined in the Strategic Defence Review of 1998 are considerably broader than those whose destruction threaten the survival of the state. The use of nuclear weapons to protect such interests is likely to be disproportionate and therefore unlawful under Article 2(4) of the UN Charter.

The phrase "very survival of the state" is a direct quote from paragraph 97 of the ICJ ruling. With regards to international humanitarian law, they found that

it [is] hard to envisage any scenario in which the use of Trident, as currently constituted, could be consistent with the IHL prohibitions on indiscriminate attacks and unnecessary suffering. Further, such use would be highly likely to result in a violation of the principle of neutrality.

Finally, with reference to the NPT, Sands and Law found that

A broadening of the deterrence policy to incorporate prevention of nonnuclear attacks so as to justify replacing or upgrading Trident would appear to be inconsistent with Article VI; b) Attempts to justify Trident upgrade or replacement as an insurance against unascertainable future threats would appear to be inconsistent with Article VI; c) Enhancing the targeting capability or yield flexibility of the Trident system is likely to be inconsistent with Article VI; d) Renewal or replacement of Trident at the same capability is likely to be inconsistent with Article VI; and e) In each case such inconsistency could give rise to a material breach of the NPT.

=== Scots law ===
In 1999 a legal case was put forward to attempt to use the ICJ's Opinion in establishing the illegality of nuclear weapons.

On 27 September 1999, three Trident Ploughshares activists Ulla Røder from Denmark, Angie Zelter from England, and Ellen Moxley from Scotland, were acquitted of charges of malicious damage at Greenock Sheriff Court. The three women had boarded Maytime, a barge moored in Loch Goil and involved in scientific work connected with the Vanguard-class submarines berthed in the nearby Gareloch, and caused £80,000 worth of damage. As is often the case in trials relating to such actions, the defendants attempted to establish that their actions were necessary, in that they had prevented what they saw as "nuclear crime".

The acquittal of the Trident Three resulted in the High Court of Justiciary, the supreme criminal court in Scots law, considering a Lord Advocate's Reference, and presenting the first detailed analysis of the ICJ Opinion by another judicial body. The High Court was asked to answer four questions:

1. In a trial under Scottish criminal procedure, is it competent to lead evidence as to the content of customary international law as it applies in the United Kingdom?
2. Does any rule of customary international law justify a private individual in Scotland in damaging or destroying property in pursuit of his or her objection to the United Kingdom's possession of nuclear weapons, its action in placing such weapons at locations within Scotland or its policies in relation to such weapons?
3. Does the belief of an accused person that his or her actions are justified in law constitute a defence to a charge of malicious mischief or theft?
4. Is it a general defence to a criminal charge that the offence was committed in order to prevent or bring to an end the commission of an offence by another person?

The four collective answers given by Lord Prosser, Lord Kirkwood and Lord Penrose were all negative. This did not have the effect of overturning the acquittals of Roder, Zelter and Moxley (Scots law, like many other jurisdictions, does not allow for an acquittal to be appealed); however, it does have the effect of invalidating the ratio decidendi under which the three women were able to argue for their acquittal, and ensures that similar defences cannot be present in Scots Law.

== See also ==
- Global Security Institute
- International humanitarian law
- List of International Court of Justice cases
- Martens Clause
- Mutual assured destruction
- Nuclear warfare
- Nuclear weapons convention
- Humanitarian Initiative
- Parliamentarians for Nuclear Non-Proliferation and Disarmament
- Treaty on the Prohibition of Nuclear Weapons
