= Jurisdiction of the International Court of Justice =

The International Court of Justice has jurisdiction in two types of cases: contentious cases between states in which the Court produces binding rulings between states that agree, or have previously agreed, to submit to the ruling of the Court; and advisory opinions, which provide reasoned, but non-binding, rulings on properly submitted questions of international law, usually at the request of the United Nations General Assembly. Advisory opinions do not have to concern particular controversies between states, though they often do.

== Contentious cases ==
The key principle is that the Court only has jurisdiction on the basis of consent. The Court has no true compulsory jurisdiction. Jurisdiction is often a key question for the Court, because it is challenged by the respondent. At the Preliminary Objections phase, a respondent may challenge (i) jurisdiction and/or (ii) admissibility of the case. Article 36 outlines four bases on which the Court's jurisdiction may be founded.

According to Article 34(1) ICJ Statute, only states may be parties in contentious cases before the ICJ. Individuals, corporations, parts of a federal state, NGOs, UN organs and self-determination groups are excluded from direct participation in cases, although the Court may receive information from public international organisations. This does not preclude non-state interests from being the subject of proceedings if one state brings the case against another. For example, a state may, in case of "diplomatic protection", bring a case on behalf of one of its nationals or corporations.

=== Special agreement ===
First, Article 36(1) ICJ Statute provides that parties may refer cases to the Court. In such instances, it exercises jurisdiction based on a "special agreement" or compromis. This method is based on explicit consent and owes its effectiveness from shared desire of the parties concerned for the Court to resolve the dispute, making them more likely to comply with the Court's judgment. Parties will usually define the nature of the dispute between them and the legal questions on which they wish the Court to rule. Cases which have been referred to Court by special agreement include the Kasikili-Sedudu Island case and the Case concerning the Continental Shelf (Tunisia/Libyan Arab Jamahiriya).

=== Compromissory clause ===
Second, 36(1) also gives the Court jurisdiction over "matters specifically provided for ... in treaties and conventions in force". Many treaties will contain a compromissory clause, providing for dispute resolution by the International Court of Justice. For instance, Article 36(2) of the United Nations Convention Against Illicit Traffic in Narcotic Drugs and Psychotropic Substances provides for mediation and other dispute-resolution options, but also states that "[a]ny such dispute which cannot be settled ... shall be referred, at the request of any one of the States Parties to the dispute, to the International Court of Justice for decision". Cases founded on compromissary clauses have not been as effective as cases founded on special agreement, since a state may have no interest in having the matter examined by the Court and may refuse to comply with a judgment. Since the 1970s the use of such compromissory clauses has declined. Many modern treaties set out their own dispute-resolution regime, often based on forms of arbitration. In 1987, upon the initiative of Mikhail Gorbachev, all of the permanent members of the Security Council began negotiations for expanding the compulsory jurisdiction of the ICJ. The content of these negotiations is to date unknown, and no agreements were reached.

=== Optional clause declarations ===
Thirdly, Article 36(2) allows states to make declarations accepting the Court's jurisdiction as compulsory ("optional clause declarations"). Not all countries accept the compulsory jurisdiction of the International Court of Justice, ICJ. For example, Australia accepts compulsory ICJ jurisdiction "with reservations" whereas Brazil has not accepted compulsory ICJ jurisdiction, directly. However, Brazil has accepted the compulsory jurisdiction by becoming a Party to the Pact of Bogota.

It was, moreover, to a Brazilian delegate, Raul Fernandes, that the concept of the optional compulsory jurisdiction mechanism was owed. First adopted in 1922 for the Permanent Court of International Justice (the predecessor of the International Court of Justice under the League of Nations), this system was readopted in 1945 for the International Court of Justice. "The 'Fernandes clause' has thus had the merit, not only of having represented a historic step forward for international law, but also of constituting today, for 62 States, one of the bases of the Court's jurisdiction", according to its president.

==== Succession from PCIJ ====
Finally, 36(5) provides for jurisdiction on the basis of declarations made under the Permanent Court of International Justice's statute. As of 2018, only five such declarations remained effective: those of Luxemburg, the Dominican Republic, Haiti, Panama, and Uruguay. Article 37 of the ICJ Statute similarly transfers jurisdiction under any compromissory clause in a treaty that gave jurisdiction to the PCIJ.

=== Doctrine of forum prorogatum ===
Under the doctrine of forum prorogatum, a state can consent to the jurisdiction of a tribunal once an application instituting proceedings against it has been filed even if it has not, in principle, recognized the jurisdiction of that tribunal. The tribunal's lack of jurisdiction is thus retroactively remedied through the consent of the respondent state. The ICJ has established jurisdiction based on forum prorogatum in a number of cases, including Corfu Channel and Certain Questions of Mutual Assistance in Criminal Matters (Djibouti v. France).

== Advisory opinions ==
An advisory opinion is a function of the Court open only to specified United Nations bodies and agencies. On receiving a request, the Court decides which States and organizations might provide useful information and gives them an opportunity to present written or oral statements. The Court's advisory opinion procedure is otherwise modelled on that for contentious cases, and the sources of applicable law are the same. In principle the Court's advisory opinions are consultative in character and as such do not generally result in judgments that aim to resolve specific controversies. Certain instruments or regulations can, however, provide in advance that the advisory opinion shall be specifically binding on particular agencies or states.

The advisory opinions of the Court are influential and widely respected interpretations of the law, but they are not authoritative, and they are inherently non-binding under the Statute of the Court. Examples of advisory opinions can be found in the section advisory opinions in the List of International Court of Justice cases article.

== The ICJ and the Security Council ==
The relationship between the ICJ and the Security Council, and the separation of their powers, was considered by the Court in 1992, in the Pan Am case. The Court had to consider an application from Libya for the order of provisional measures to protect its rights, which, it alleged, were being infringed by the threat of economic sanctions by the UK and United States. The problem was that these sanctions had been authorised by the Security Council, which resulted with a potential conflict between the Chapter VII functions of the Security Council and the judicial function of the Court. The Court decided, by eleven votes to five, that it could not order the requested provisional measures because the rights claimed by Libya, even if legitimate under the Montreal Convention, could no longer be upheld since the action was justified by the Security Council. In accordance with Article 103 of the UN Charter, obligations under the Charter took precedence over other treaty obligations.

There was a marked reluctance on the part of a majority of the Court to become involved in a dispute in such a way as to bring it potentially into conflict with the Council. The Court stated in the Nicaragua case (Jurisdiction) that there is no necessary inconsistency between action by the Security Council and adjudication by the ICJ. However, where there is room for conflict, the balance appears to be in favour of the Security Council.

Should either party fail "to perform the obligations incumbent upon it under a judgment rendered by the Court", the Security Council may be called upon to "make recommendations or decide upon measures" if the security council deems such actions necessary. In practice, the Court's powers have been limited by the unwillingness of the losing party to abide by the Court's ruling, and by the Security Council's unwillingness to enforce consequences. However, in theory, "so far as the parties to the case are concerned, a judgment of the Court is binding, final and without appeal," and "by signing the Charter, a State Member of the United Nations undertakes to comply with any decision of the International Court of Justice in a case to which it is a party".

For example, in Nicaragua v. United States the United States of America had previously accepted the Court's compulsory jurisdiction upon its creation in 1946 but withdrew its acceptance following the Court's judgment in 1984 that called on the United States to "cease and to refrain" from the "unlawful use of force" against the government of Nicaragua. In a split decision, the majority of the Court ruled the United States was "in breach of its obligation under customary international law not to use force against another state" and ordered the US pay reparations (see note 2), although it never did.

Examples of cases include:

- A complaint by the United States in 1980 that Iran was detaining American diplomats in Tehran in violation of international law.
- A dispute between Tunisia and Libya over the delimitation of the continental shelf between them.
- A dispute over the course of the maritime boundary dividing the U.S. and Canada in the Gulf of Maine area.
- A complaint by the Federal Republic of Yugoslavia against the member states of the North Atlantic Treaty Organization regarding their actions in the Kosovo War. This was denied on 15 December 2004 due to lack of jurisdiction, because the FRY was not a party to the ICJ Statute at the time it made the application.

The last example can be used as evidence of the Court's failure to take on politically controversial cases; as the Court has no means to enforce its rulings, its survival is dependent on its political legitimacy. That would be endangered if it constantly came with rulings which states have no interest of taking into consideration. This is one of the Court's major shortcomings: its rulings must be considered in a political context.

== See also ==
- List of International Court of Justice cases
- List of treaties that confer jurisdiction on the International Court of Justice
- Universal jurisdiction
