= Right of Passage over Indian Territory (Portugal v. India) =

International Law case

- Court: International Court of Justice
- Decided: 12 April 1960
- Citation: ICJ Reports 1960

Keywords
- Right of passage, enclaves, sovereignty, international law

Right of Passage over Indian Territory (Portugal v. India) was a 1960 judgment of the International Court of Justice (ICJ) in the case of Portugal's assertion to a right of passage over Indian territory to access its enclaves of Dadra and Nagar Haveli from Daman. Portugal argued that it possessed a customary and historical right of transit over persons, goods, and officials, including armed forces, while India argued that any previous toleration of passage had always been permissive and may be legally withdrawn.

== Background ==
The Portuguese had dominion over some regions of India for a hundred years plus between 1505 and 1961. The regions, as a whole, were termed Portuguese India and included:

1. Goa
2. Dadra and Nagar Haveli
3. Damao (Daman)
4. Diu

After Indian independence in 1947, Portugal had maintained certain minor enclaves within India, such as Dadra and Nagar Haveli, that were completely surrounded by Indian territory. In August 1961, Dadra and Nagar Haveli were incorporated into India. Dadra and Nagar Haveli were merged within India in August 1961. Up to December 11, the Prime Minister Jawaharlal Nehru had issued the warning that "India's patience was exhausted". On December 19, the Portuguese control over Goa, Daman, and Diu ended as the result of an Indian military operation.

From 1954 to 1961, with the withdrawal of Dadra and Nagar Haveli from Portuguese control, Portugal's Indian possessions were no longer contiguous. Portugal was refused the right of passage to Indian officials and armed forces, and Portugal brought the matter to the ICJ in December 1955 in the form of an application.

== Proceedings ==
The case was brought to the ICJ on 22 December 1955 by Portugal Itrtugal asserted that it had a right of passage that was legally enforceable, founded on historical treaties (including one with the British Indian state of Pune under the Maratha ruler) and uniform practice during British India.

Portugal submitted that India had violated international law by obstructing its ability to administer its enclaves. Its claims included:

1. A right of passage for persons, goods, civil and armed officials between Daman and Dadra and Nagar Haveli, and between the enclaves themselves.
2. India’s obstruction constituted obstruction of Portuguese sovereignty.
3. A request that the ICJ direct India to cease military action and restore the right of passage.

India raised six preliminary objections to jurisdiction and admissibility:

First objection: Portugal’s declaration of acceptance was invalid due to a reservation allowing exclusions at any time. (Dismissed)

Second objection: The case was premature as India had not been formally notified of Portugal’s declaration. (Dismissed)

Third objection: No "legal dispute" existed amongst the parties, as negotiations had not been exhausted. (Dismissed)

Fourth objection: India was deprived of its right to reciprocity. (Dismissed)

Fifth objection: The matter fell within India’s domestic jurisdiction. (Joined to merits)

Sixth objection: The dispute arose prior to 1930 and was excluded by India’s reservation to the treaty. (Joined to merits)

== Judgment on Merits ==
The ICJ delivered its judgment on 12 April 1960. By a majority of 11 votes to 4, the Court decided that Portugal had a limited right of passage for private persons, civil officials, and goods necessary for the exercise of its sovereignty over the enclaves, based on accepyted historical practice.

However, by a narrower majority of 9 votes, the Court held that Portugal did not have a right to move armed forces, armed police, or military supplies across Indian territory. India was not in breach of international law when it restricted such passage.

The Court examined Portugal’s argument based on an 18th-century treaty with the Marathas, and ruled that it conferred only right to collect revenue and not sovereignty. Sovereignty was established through Portuguese administrative control, later recognized by British India and tacitly accepted by independent India.

The Court also held that India had a right to regulate civilian passage in light of regional tensions, and rejected Portugal’s contention that India unlawfully restricted delegations in the 1950s.

== Dissenting Opinions ==
Vice-President Badawi, Judge Klaestad (with Judge ad hoc Fernandes), and Indian Judge ad hoc M. C. Chagla were in dissent. They argued that sovereignty necessarily encompassed the right to use armed forces for administration, and restrictions imposed by India unlawfully curbed Portugal’s rights.

== Subsequent Developments ==
The judgment was followed by India’s military annexation of Goa, Daman, and Diu in December 1961, marking the eventual end to the Portuguese colonial rule in India.

Dadra and Nagar Haveli was formally incorporated into India by the Constitution (Tenth Amendment) Act, 1961. This amendment inserted Article 240(1)(c) which empowered the President to make regulations for the territory, and confirmed administration under Article 239 of the Constitution of India.
