= Botswana–Namibia relations =

Bilateral relations between Botswana and Namibia

- Botswana: Namibia

Botswana–Namibia relations refers to the current and historical relationship between Botswana and Namibia. Botswana gained independence from Britain in September 1966. Namibia gained independence from South Africa in 1990 following the Namibian War of Independence, and the two countries soon after established formal diplomatic relations. Botswana has a high commission in Windhoek and Namibia has one in Gaborone. Both countries are members of the Southern African Development Community, African Union, Group of 77, and Commonwealth of Nations.

== Treaties ==
As of 2008, there was no treaty covering the long border between Botswana and Namibia. The border remains as defined by a treaty signed on 1 July 1890 between Great Britain and Germany delimiting their respective spheres of influence in Africa. Disputes about the border led in the 1990s to considerable tension between the two governments.

In 1994, Botswana, Namibia and Angola agreed to establish the Okavango River Basin Commission, with a view to establishing a treaty governing joint use of the water resources, but progress towards finalizing the treaty has been slow. In 2004, Botswana and Namibia were cosignatories along with other states of the Zambezi river basin of an agreement establishing the Zambezi Watercourse Commission to manage the riparian resources of the Zambezi.

== Economic cooperation ==
In 2002, the Namibia and Botswana Power Corporations signed an agreement to supply electricity to the Ghanzi and De Hoek areas in Botswana and Namibia respectively. Namibia and Botswana have been considering collaboration on development of new fiber-optic communications to bypass South Africa, in an effort to reduce costs. In 2008, South Africa, Botswana, Namibia and Zimbabwe held a legal joint sale behind closed doors in Namibia of seven tons of ivory to Chinese and Japanese bidders, earning more than US$1.18 million. In October 2008, Namibia approved the proposal by a private company to export coal from Botswana via a railway to be constructed to Namibian ports. The Mmamabula deposit is said to possess about 2.8 billion tonnes of coal reserves (see Mining industry of Botswana).

== Disputes ==
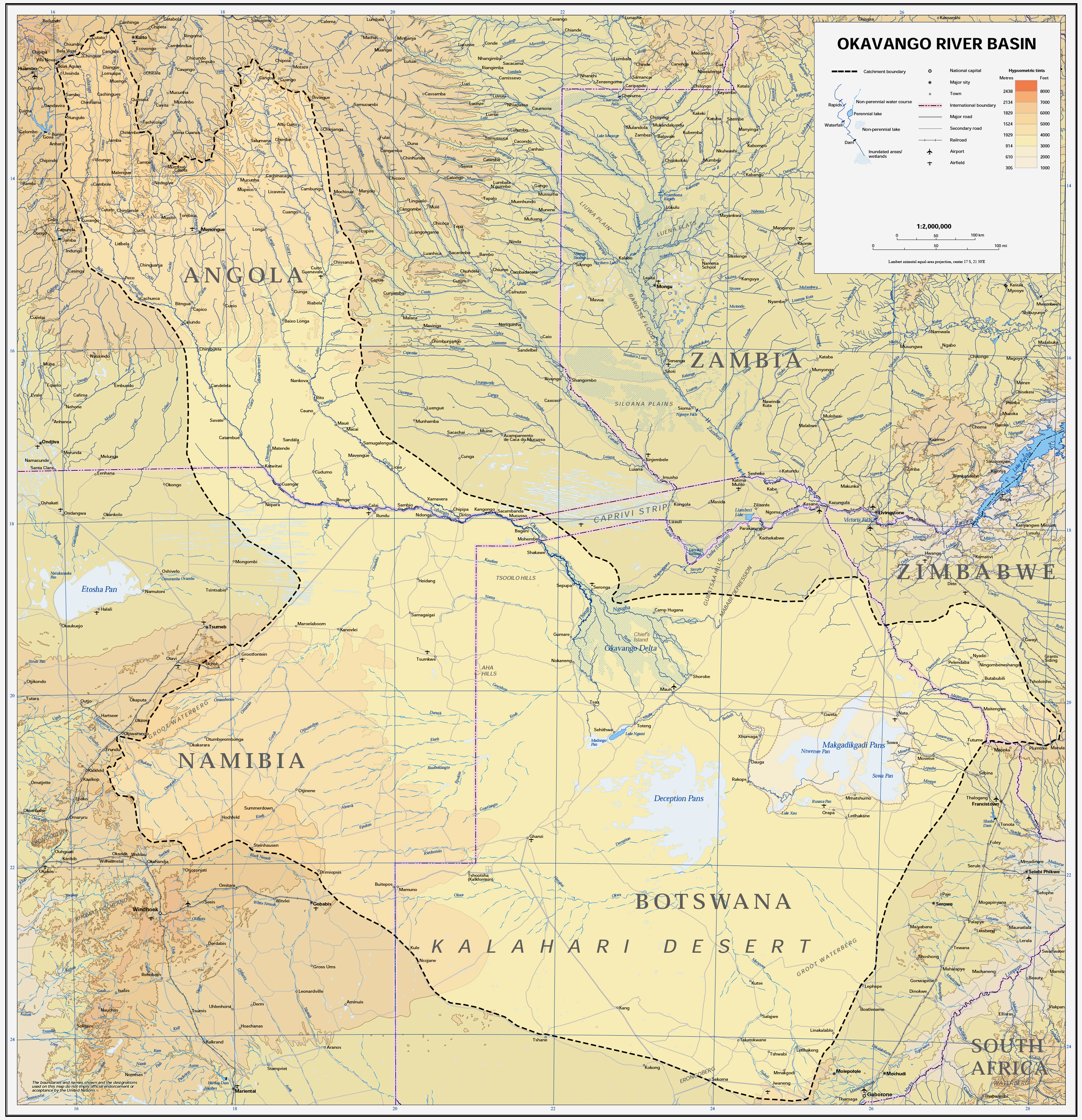
Okavango river basin map.

Botswana and Namibia had a long-running dispute about ownership of the Kasikili / Sedudu island in the Chobe River, which forms part of the border between the two countries. In December 1999, judges at the World Court ruled that the island belongs to Botswana. In the Caprivi Strip, the UNHCR reported that between October 1998 and February 1999 more than 2,400 Namibians crossed south into Botswana.

The Okavango Delta in Botswana is an area famous internationally for its birds and wildlife and an important source of tourist revenue, but depends on the Okavango River which flows from Angola via Namibia. In 1997 Namibia had been facing an extended drought and announced plans to divert water from the river, which threatened to become a serious issue between the two countries.

Namibia has been critical of Botswana's "shoot to kill" policy against wildlife poachers. In 2015 and in 2020 several Namibians were killed as suspected poachers by the Botswanan military.

== Diplomatic staff ==
- Elisabeth Kakukuru, Namibia's high commissioner to Botswana

== See also ==
- Foreign relations of Botswana
- Foreign relations of Namibia
