= Ellen Moxley =

Quaker and peace activist

- Ellen Moxley (left) and Helen Steven (right) accepting the Gandhi International Peace Award in 2004
- Born: 12 March 1935
- Died: 8 July 2019 (aged 84)
- Known for: Peace activism
- Partner: Helen Steven
- Awards: Right Livelihood Award (2001); Gandhi International Peace Prize (2004)

Ellen Moxley (12 March 1935 – 8 July 2019) was a Chinese-American Quaker and peace activist based in Scotland who engaged in non-violent direct action. She was arrested as part of The Trident Three who boarded and damaged a nuclear facility in Loch Goil and were later acquitted. As a member of the Trident Ploughshares, she received the Right Livelihood Award in 2001. With her life partner Helen Steven, she was awarded the Gandhi International Peace Award in 2004 for their lifelong peace activism.

== Early life ==
Moxley was born on 12 March 1935 in Nanjing, China to an American mother, Marian, and Chinese father, Sun. Marian went back to the US with her daughter ahead of the Japanese invasion in 1937. Marian subsequently married Jim Moxley, and Ellen took his surname. Moxley attended Mount Holyoke university for women, Massachusetts, and graduated in zoology in 1957. She went on to work at San Diego Zoo. She became a member of the Quaker community while at university and this would inform her later peace activism. Moxley travelled to Europe with her mother, living in Paris and then London, where she worked in St Bart's Hospital. Her mother died in London in 1967.

From 1972 to 1974, Moxley managed an orphanage in Saigon. There she met Helen Steven, who was to become her life partner. Moxley adopted a baby, Marian Beeby, from the orphanage where she worked in 1975. Moxley moved to Scotland with Helen and Marian in 1981.

== Peace activism ==
Moxley co-founded the affinity group Gareloch Horticulturalists, which engaged in non-violent direct action including at Faslane Naval Base. In 1985, Moxley and Steven opened Peace House in Braco, Perthshire with the supported of the Iona Community and the Quakers. They ran courses about peace, justice and non-violent direct action, which were attended by more than 10,000 people before it closed in 1999.

Moxley became more involved in direct action with the group Trident Ploughshares. On 27 September 1999, Moxley, Ulla Røder from Denmark and Angie Zelter from England boarded Maytime, a nuclear facility moored in Loch Goil and caused £80,000 worth of damage to equipment. The Trident Three, as they became known, were arrested and kept on remand in Cornton Vale prison for three months but were later acquitted of charges of malicious damage at Greenock Sheriff Court. The three argued that their actions were necessary to prevent what they saw as "nuclear crime". The acquittal of the Trident Three resulted in the High Court of Justiciary, the supreme criminal court in Scots law, considering a Lord Advocate's Reference, and presenting a detailed analysis of the International Court of Justice Opinion by another judicial body. The Trident Ploughshares received the Right Livelihood Award in 2001 in recognition of this action.

In 2004, Moxley and Steven were jointly awarded the Gandhi International Peace Award for their work in "campaigning against weapons of mass destruction and the arms industry over the past 30 years".

== Later life and death ==
Moxley and Steven moved to Lochinver. Moxley continued her activism with the Assynt for Peace group and the Iona Community. At age 80 and with a lung condition, Moxley took part in a four-day fast for peace to commemorate Hiroshima Day in 2015 outside the Scottish Parliament in Edinburgh.

Steven died in 2016. Moxley died three years later at her home in Lochinver on 8 July 2019.
