= United Nations Security Council Resolution 984 =

UN Security Council Resolution 984
- Localisation of nuclear weapons in the world
- Date: 11 April 1995
- Meeting no.: 3,154
- Code: S/RES/984 (Document)
- Subject: Non-proliferation
- Voting summary: 15 voted for; None voted against; None abstained
- Result: Adopted

Security Council composition
- Permanent members: China; France; Russia; United Kingdom; United States
- Non-permanent members: Argentina; Botswana; Czech Republic; Germany; Honduras; Indonesia; Italy; Nigeria; Oman; Rwanda

In United Nations Security Council resolution 984, adopted unanimously on 11 April 1995, the council gave assurances to non-nuclear states that were parties to the Nuclear Non-Proliferation Treaty (NPT) against the threat of nuclear proliferation.

The Security Council stated that every effort should be made to avoid the danger of nuclear war, to prevent the spread of nuclear weapons, to facilitate international cooperation on peaceful uses of nuclear energy and to promote the importance of the NPT. It recognised the interest of countries without nuclear weapons to receive security assurances and that the current resolution was a step in this direction.

The permanent members of the Council (all of which possessed nuclear weapons) had given security assurances to non-nuclear countries that were part of the NPT, the first time this had occurred. The Security Council recognised the need to give assurances to non-nuclear weapons states, and that the permanent members of the council will act, according to relevant provisions in the Charter of the United Nations, in the event that a country is threatened or attacked with nuclear weapons. It also recognised that the permanent member states would bring such incidents to the attention of the Security Council. Assistance would be given in any case, with investigations and appropriate measures to settle disputes and restore international peace and security. Measures would also be taken to provide technical, medical, scientific or humanitarian assistance in response to any requests from an affected country. Additionally, appropriate measures would be recommended with regard to compensation after instances of aggression and the intention of some countries to provide immediate assistance to an affected country was welcomed by the council.

All countries were requested, as provided in Article VI of the NPT, to negotiate measures for disarmament and a treaty on complete disarmament under international control. It also reaffirmed the right, under Article 51 of the Charter, to self-defense if a country was attacked.

Under Resolution 984, France, Russia, the United Kingdom, and the United States would, on condition not to use nuclear weapons against a non-nuclear state party to the NPT except in an attack on them; only China's assurances not to use nuclear weapons were unconditional.

== See also ==
- International Court of Justice advisory opinion on the Legality of the Threat or Use of Nuclear Weapons
- List of states with nuclear weapons
- List of United Nations Security Council Resolutions 901 to 1000 (1994–1995)
- Nuclear energy policy
- United Nations Security Council Resolution 255 (1968)
