= Rowan Tilly =

British peace, climate change, and GMO activist

Rowan Tilly is a British peace activist, a climate change activist, and an active opponent of genetically modified crops (GMOs). She has been arrested on many occasions. An advocate of nonviolent direct action and de-escalation, she has produced training videos and books on these topics.

== Peace activism ==
Tilly, a furniture maker who attended the University of Huddersfield, first read about the Greenham Common Women's Peace Camp in the magazine Peace News. She decided to join the Embrace The Base action in December 1982 when more than 30,000 women joined hands around the perimeter fence of the RAF Greenham Common base, near Newbury, Berkshire. Before that she hadn't been involved in the peace movement but has said that she had been having nightmares about nuclear war. She stayed at the Greenham camp for six months in 1983. She has noted that while Greenham had a big impact on her political awareness, the activities there were loose and anarchic and not directly related to her subsequent activism, which was well planned.

On 6 July 1993 she was one of 15 women from the Women's Nuclear Test Ban Network and two men to break into Buckingham Palace Garden in protest against the testing of UK nuclear weapons on the lands of the Western Shoshone people in the US. A banner was also unfurled outside the palace grounds. The police said the action, which caused a huge security alert, was "very meticulously planned and expertly executed". The protestors said that they wanted to draw the attention of Queen Elizabeth II to the 23 nuclear tests that Britain had conducted in the Nevada desert. The press reported that many of the women had been at the Greenham Common camp, which did not close until 2000.

== Seeds of Hope ==
On 29 January 1996, Andrea Needham, Joanna Wilson, and Lotta Kronlid broke into BAE's Warton Aerodrome, Lancashire where British Aerospace Hawk 200 planes destined for Indonesia, which could have been used against Timor-Leste, were being assembled. Timor-Leste was at the time seeking independence from Indonesia and a high number of civilian deaths during the independence struggle had already been reported. As part of a group of ten women, including Tilly, known as "Seeds of Hope East Timor Ploughshares Group", they had spent a year preparing the operation. The three disarmed a Hawk with hammers, and then waited to be found and to claim responsibility. They were arrested and charged with causing damage of £2 million. A week later, a fourth member, Angie Zelter, was arrested for conspiracy. The four were refused bail and spent six months in prison on remand. At trial in Liverpool later that year, they argued that they should be found not guilty as they had been acting to prevent a crime, a defence that is allowed in English law. The four were acquitted by a jury.

== GMOs ==
Tilly was an early member of "genetiX snowball", a campaign of nonviolent civil responsibility aiming to build resistance to GMOs, which it described as "unwanted, unnecessary, unsafe and irreversible". The name and approach drew its inspiration from the Snowball nonviolence campaign, founded by Angie Zelter, which resisted the presence of US military nuclear arms bases in Britain in the 1980s by asking as many people as possible to cut pieces of the fences of weapons establishments and then wait to be arrested; the Swords into ploughshares tradition, which uses simple hand tools to nonviolently disarm weapons; and from other actions to protect the environment in Britain and throughout the world which had used nonviolent methods. The genetiX campaign produced a guidebook entitled A Guide to Safely Removing Genetically Modified Plants from Release Sites. Their first raid was at model farm near Oxford sponsored by Monsanto, and this was followed by the 'decontamination' of supermarkets by replacing GM foods with organic ones.

Tilly and others were taken to court by Monsanto, with the case ending up in the House of Lords. The company stated that it had been granted a licence by the government to carry out research into genetically modified crops. The group had a genuine belief that the use of these crops posed a risk to public safety and uprooted the crops planted with the hope of gaining publicity. Monsanto sought an injunction preventing the defendants' trespass. Tilly and her co-defendants contended that their actions were necessary for the protection of the public. The court concluded that Tilly could not claim the defence of necessity as there was no serious and immediate danger. Moreover only a part of the crop had been uprooted with the court concluding that if there had been a genuine belief in serious and immediate danger Tilly and others would have uprooted the entire crop. Thus the court concluded that the action was done for publicity purposes, rather than for the protection of the public.

Despite this verdict, Tilly continued her action against GMO crops. In June 2000 she was fined £250 after she and a group of others dug up GM rapeseed at a farm in Hertfordshire and deposited the plants at the headquarters of AgrEvo in Norfolk. On 16 July 2000 she was among seven people, some dressed as Grim Reapers, who invaded a field near Sherborne in Dorset, which was growing maize belonging to the Aventis chemical company. During the trial Tilly stated that she had taken part in six other similar actions. She called for a five-year moratorium on the development of such crops. She and the others were found not guilty on a legal technicality, successfully arguing that they could not be convicted of aggravated trespass because there were no other people present.

== Climate protests ==
Tilly has carried out protests relating to climate change with several different groups, including Extinction Rebellion; Insulate Britain, which argues for all houses to be insulated to reduce energy loss; and Just Stop Oil. In April 2019 she was arrested following a protest on Waterloo Bridge in London. On 18 October 2019, she was arrested for kneeling in the road at the end of Regent Street, London, holding a placard with a picture of Earth from space and the words "Love and Grief for the Earth". She refused to move despite being repeatedly asked to do so by police. At the magistrates' court the judge cited examples of similar actions, such as the Suffragettes and the US and South African civil rights movements which, despite being unlawful, had achieved desirable change. He found Tilly guilty but gave her an absolute discharge. On 13 September 2021 she was arrested and fined for blocking the M25 motorway as part of an Insulate Britain demonstration. On 12 July 2023 she was again arrested for blocking the road in London, along with many others.

After a preview screening in London on 17 April 2023 of the film How to Blow Up a Pipeline, Tilly gave a talk about the difference between violent and nonviolent direct action. She has produced several videos on nonviolent direct action, with an emphasis on de-escalation and, as of 2023, was writing a book on this topic.
