= Trident Ploughshares =

Anti-nuclear weapons group

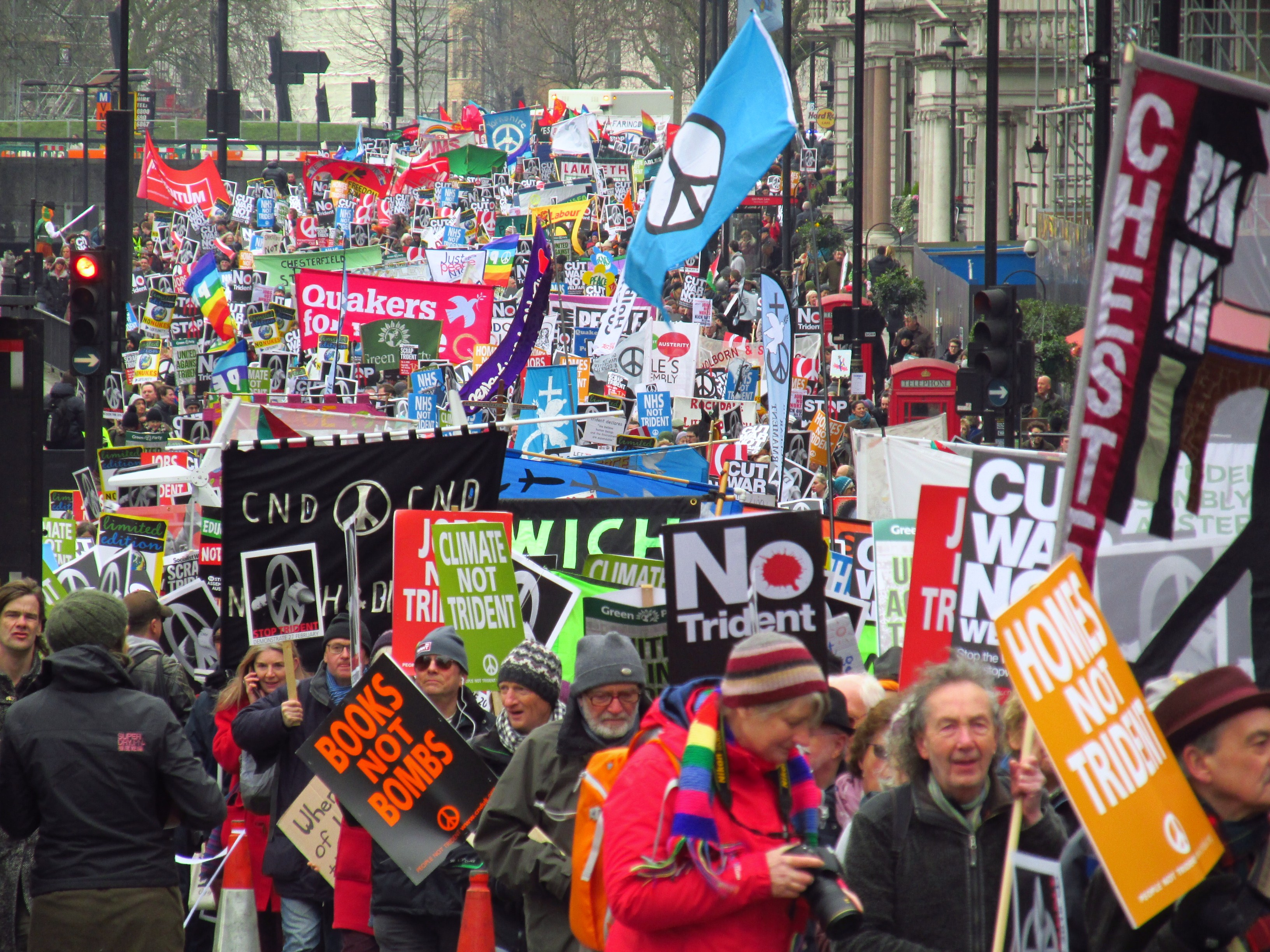
Stop Trident Protest

Trident Ploughshares (originally named Trident Ploughshares 2000) is an activist anti-nuclear weapons group, founded in 1998 with the aim of "beating swords into ploughshares" (taken from the Book of Isaiah). This is specifically by attempting to disarm the UK Trident nuclear weapons system, in a non-violent manner. The original group consisted of six core activists, including Angie Zelter, founder of the non-violent Snowball Campaign.

Based in Edinburgh, Scotland, the group is a partner in the International Campaign to Abolish Nuclear Weapons. It has attracted media attention for both its non-violent "disarmament" direct actions, and mass civil disobedience at the gates of Royal Navy establishments with connections to the United Kingdom's Trident weapons systems.

It was the recipient of the Right Livelihood Award in 2001 "for providing a practical model of principled, transparent and non-violent direct action dedicated to ridding the world of nuclear weapons."

== Trident nuclear missile system and international law ==
The foundation of Trident Ploughshare's various disarmament actions is the 1996 Advisory Opinion of the International Court of Justice, Legality of the Threat or Use of Nuclear Weapons, in which it found that "the threat or use of nuclear weapons would generally be contrary to the rules of international law applicable in armed conflict".

In addition to this, Trident Ploughshares also argues that, since the British government is not actively negotiating nuclear disarmament and is actively considering upgrading the UK Trident programme, it is in violation of the Non-Proliferation Treaty of 1968.

Trident Ploughshares activists argue that since the British government has not responded to their various communications regarding the legal status of the Trident nuclear missile system, they must take individual responsibility for disarmament.

== Previous Ploughshares actions ==
Prior to the setting up of Trident Ploughshare there were other actions carried out by members of the Ploughshares Movement, a Christian peace group.

On 29 January 1996, Andrea Needham, Joanna Wilson and Lotta Kronlid —known as the 'Ploughshares Four'—broke into the British Aerospace factory in Lancashire and caused £1.7m worth of damage to BAe Hawk number ZH955, a training aircraft that was to have been supplied along with 23 other jets to the New Order regime of Indonesia. Angie Zelter was later arrested as she announced her intention to further damage the planes.

Accused of causing, and conspiring to cause, criminal damage, with a maximum ten-year sentence, they argued that what they did was not a crime but that they "were acting to prevent British Aerospace and the British Government from aiding and abetting genocide". They were acquitted by the jury.

== Protests and criminal trials ==
The second major disturbance was on 27 April 2001, when three members of the campaign, Ellen Moxley, Ulla Røder, and Angie Zelter, boarded the barge Maytime in Loch Goil and destroyed and took equipment. After being charged with maliciously damaging the vessel, stealing two inflatable life rafts and damaging equipment in an on-board laboratory, they were acquitted at the subsequent trial in Greenock, which was later appealed to the Scottish High Court with the Lord Advocate's Reference 2001. Although under Scottish Law the High Court did not have the power to overturn the acquittals, their judgement was that the basis of the defence case should not have been admissible.

In May 2005 the group squatted on Drake's Island, a privately owned island in Plymouth Sound declaring it a "nuclear free state" in order to "highlight Britain's hypocrisy over the non-proliferation treaty talks being held in New York".

== See also ==
- Anti-nuclear movement in the United Kingdom
- Pitstop Ploughshares
