= List of treaties that confer jurisdiction on the International Court of Justice =

The International Court of Justice (ICJ) is the principal judicial organ of the United Nations. Its jurisdiction is based on the consent of states parties to the ICJ Statute, which they can express in several ways. One of them are so-called compromissory clauses in international treaties and conventions.

Treaties that confer jurisdiction to the ICJ include:

- American treaty on pacific settlement, Bogotá, 30 April 1948
- Convention on the prevention and punishment of the crime of genocide, Paris, 9 December 1948
- Revised act for the pacific settlement of international disputes, Lake Success, 28 April 1949
- Convention relating to the status of refugees, Geneva, 28 July 1951
- Treaty of peace with Japan, San Francisco, 8 September 1951
- Treaty of friendship (India/Philippines), Manila, 11 July 1952
- Universal copyright convention, Geneva, 6 September 1952
- European convention for the peaceful settlement of disputes, Strasbourg, 29 April 1957
- Single convention on narcotic drugs, New York, 30 March 1961
- Optional protocol to the Vienna convention on diplomatic relations, concerning the compulsory settlement of disputes, Vienna, 18 April 1961
- International convention on the elimination of all forms of racial discrimination, New York, 7 March 1966
- Convention on the law of treaties, Vienna, 23 May 1969
- Convention on the suppression of the unlawful seizure of aircraft, The Hague, 16 December 1970
- Treaty of commerce (Benelux/USSR), Brussels, 14 July 1971
- Convention for the suppression of unlawful acts against the safety of civil aviation, Montreal, 23 September 1971
- International convention against the taking of hostages, New York, 17 December 1979
- General peace treaty (Honduras/El Salvador), Lima, 30 October 1980
- United Nations Convention against torture and other cruel, inhuman or degrading treatment or punishment, New York, 1985
- Convention on treaties concluded between States and international organizations or between international organizations, Vienna, 21 March 1986
- United Nations convention against illicit traffic in narcotic drugs and psychotropic substances, Vienna, 20 December 1988
- United Nations framework convention on climate change, New York, 9 May 1992
- Convention on Biological Diversity, Rio de Janeiro, 5 June 1992
- Convention on the prohibition of the development, production, stockpiling and use of chemical weapons and their destruction, Paris, 13 January 1993
