= Marc Guillaume =

French civil servant (born 1964)

Prefect of Paris
- Incumbent
- Assumed office 17 August 2020
- Preceded by: Michel Cadot

Personal details
- Born: 14 December 1964 (age 61)
- Parent: Gilbert Guillaume (father)

Marc Guillaume (born 14 December 1964) is a French civil servant who has been serving as prefect of Paris since 2020. From 2015 to 2020, he served as secretary general of the French government. From 2007 to 2015, he served as secretary general of the Constitutional Council. From 2002 to 2007, he was the head of the Directorate of Civil Affairs and Seals of the Ministry of Justice. He is the son of Gilbert Guillaume.
