= United Nations Security Council Resolution 255 =

UN Security Council Resolution 255
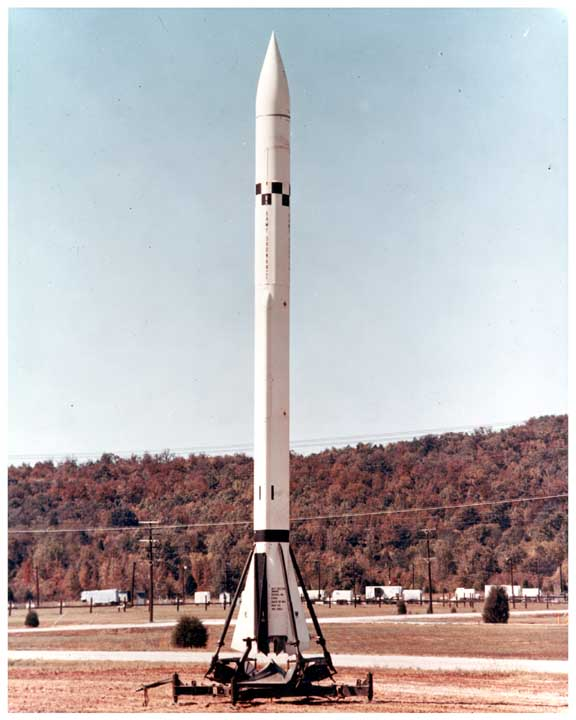
- MGM-5 Corporal
- Date: June 19 1968
- Meeting no.: 1433
- Code: S/RES/255 (Document)
- Subject: Question relating to measures to safeguard non-nuclear-weapon States parties to the Treaty on the Non-Proliferation of Nuclear Weapons
- Voting summary: 10 voted for; None voted against; 5 abstained
- Result: Adopted

Security Council composition
- Permanent members: China; France; Soviet Union; United Kingdom; United States
- Non-permanent members: Algeria; Brazil; Canada; Denmark; Ethiopia; Hungary; India; Pakistan; Paraguay; Senegal

United Nations Security Council Resolution 255, adopted on June 19, 1968, after a large number of states began to subscribe to the Treaty on the Non-Proliferation of Nuclear Weapons the Council recognized that aggression with nuclear weapons or the threat of it against a non-nuclear-weapon state would create a situation in which the Security Council, and above all its nuclear-weapon State members would have to act immediately in accordance with their obligations under the UN Charter.

The council also welcomed the intention expressed by certain States that they will provide or support immediate assistance to a non-nuclear-weapon state party to the treaty that is a victim of an act or the object of the threat in which nuclear weapons are used and reaffirmed that inherent right of individual and collective self-defense.

The resolution passed with 10 votes to none; Algeria, Brazil, France, India and Pakistan abstained.

== See also ==
- List of United Nations Security Council Resolutions 201 to 300 (1965–1971)
- Nuclear proliferation
- United Nations Security Council Resolution 984 (1995)
