= Situngu =

Island in Botswana

Situngu Island
- Location within Botswana

Geography
- Location: Chobe River adjacent to Namibian border
- Coordinates: 18.0644491759922°S 24.11396038600604°E

Administration
- Botswana

Demographics
- Population: Unpopulated

Situngu Island (also known as Luyondo, Singobeka, Mbala and Zoti in Namibia) is a fluvial island in the Chobe River, in Botswana adjacent to the border with Namibia.

== Territorial dispute ==
In 1977 Namibia and Botswana entered into a dispute over ownership of the Situngu island. In October 1997 the Botswana Armed Forces discovered ploughed fields on the southern side of the island. The island has been used by Namibian farmers for generations. The Botswana army erected two tents on the island. In January 1998 a high-level Namibia delegation was prevented from entering the island by the Botswana Armed Forces. The soldiers harvested crops raised by Namibian farmers and disallowed those without passports to enter the island. In January 1998 a meeting was held to demarcate the border, but failed to resolve the issue.

On 5 February 2018 a border treaty was signed between Botswana and Namibia which saw the island being ceded to Botswana.

== See also ==
- Sedudu
