= Compromis =

Accord to submit a dispute to arbitration

In international law and diplomacy, a compromis (French for "compromise") is an agreement between two parties to submit a dispute to international arbitration for a binding resolution. A compromis is made after a dispute has already arisen, rather than before. (This is in contrast to provisions in existing treaties or protocols for resolving future disputes.) The compromis identifies a neutral third party - the arbitrator or arbitral tribunal - or specifies the manner of appointment. The compromis often sets forth the precise question or questions to be decided; the arbitral rules of procedure; the seat of the tribunal; the languages to be used in the proceeding; the applicable law; and the payment of costs.

A compromis to submit a dispute to arbitration can be made ad hoc by two or more states, or it can be on the basis of a reciprocal declaration made under the Statute of the International Court of Justice. Article 36(2) of the Statute of the ICJ provides that: "The states parties to the present Statute may at any time declare that they recognize as compulsory ipso facto and without special agreement, in relation to any other state accepting the same obligation, the jurisdiction of the Court in all legal disputes concerning: a. the interpretation of a treaty; b. any question of international law; c. the existence of any fact which, if established, would constitute a breach of an international obligation; d. the nature or extent of the reparation to be made for the breach of an international obligation." Article 36(3) provides that: "The declarations referred to above may be made unconditionally or on condition of reciprocity on the part of several or certain states, or for a certain time."

The device of a Compromis has been used for many years. Treaties reported by Jean Dumont, a compiler of early treaties, show among many other examples, that an 1176/77 dispute between Castile and Navarra over certain territories and castles in Spain was submitted to King Henry II of England for resolution; an 1177 compromis and 1180 compromis between Henry II of England and Philip II of France submitted a dispute concerning Auvergne and other territories to arbitration by three bishops and barons on either side; and a June 1298 compromis submitted to Pope Boniface VIII a dispute between Edward I of England and Philip IV of France over English fiefs in France.

An example of a modern compromis is the 1996 Special Agreement between Botswana and Namibia, which referred the two countries' dispute over Sedudu (Kasikili) island to the ICJ for resolution. The ICJ decided the Case concerning Kasikili/Sedudu Island (Botswana/Namibia) in 1999, ruling for Botswana.

A compromis may also be used to submit international investment or trade disputes to arbitration.
