= Ulla Røder =

Danish peace activist

Ulla Røder (born 1954) is a Danish peace activist who has been involved in non-violent direct action in the UK and Denmark. She is a member of the Ploughshares group and was one of the 'Trident Three' awarded the Right Livelihood Award in 2001.

== Early life ==
Bodil Ulla Røder was born in Odense, Denmark in August 1954. She became concerned about the threat of nuclear war following the accident at the Chernobyl nuclear power plant in 1986 and nuclear tests that took place from 1995. She joined peace organisations in Denmark and was a founding member of the Danish Working Group Against Nuclear Tests which protested against the development of tactical nuclear weapons. She was involved in a letter-writing campaign with the Trident Ploughshares to the Danish prime minister Nyrup Rasmussen and other members of parliament protesting the illegality of NATO nuclear weapons.

She moved to Scotland in 2000 and worked at a community education centre. While in Scotland, she was a member of the Scottish Campaign for Nuclear Disarmament and the Scottish Coalition for Justice not War. She also became involved in direct action at nuclear facilities.

== Peace activism ==
=== The Trident Three ===
In 1999, along with Ellen Moxley from the US and Angie Zelter from England, Røder boarded Maytime, a nuclear facility moored in Loch Goil and caused £100,000 worth of damage to equipment. The Trident Three, as they became known, were arrested and kept on remand in Cornton Vale prison for three months but were later acquitted of charges of malicious damage at Greenock Sheriff Court. The three argued that their actions were necessary to prevent what they saw as "nuclear crime". The acquittal of the Trident Three resulted in the High Court of Justiciary, the supreme criminal court in Scots law, considering a Lord Advocate's Reference, and presenting a detailed analysis of the International Court of Justice Opinion by another judicial body.

=== RAF Fylingdales ===
Røder set up a one-woman protest at an RAF base in Yorkshire, England in 2002. RAF Fylingdales was intended to play a key role in the "Son of Star Wars" nuclear missile programme, which was opposed by peace and disarmament groups.

=== RAF Leuchars ===
In March 2003, Røder was charged with damaging a Tornado bomber at RAF Leuchars in Scotland. She was again held on remand in Cornton Vale prison but was released in August due to a technicality. She denied malicious damage but claimed to have taken a hammer to the plane and said "I don't see it flying again." She gave an address at Wiston, Lanarkshire.

=== Ungdomshuset, Copenhagen ===
Røder was involved in working with young people in Ungdomshuset (the Youth Center) to channel unrest as a result of threatened eviction into non-violent resistance. The heavy-handed police response led to the worst riots in recent Danish history, which Røder considered to be a result of increasingly strict anti-terror laws and militarization in Denmark.

== Awards and recognition ==
The Trident Ploughshares received the Right Livelihood Award in 2001 in recognition of their direct action on the Maytime in Loch Goil.

In 2004, a documentary called Ullas Vrede (Ulla's Anger) was produced for Danish television. It depicted "a story of power, impotence and civil disobedience" from Røder's perspective. It was part of a series called Pictures of Power with the theme of Civil Power.
