= Seeds of Hope =

English plowshares group

Seeds of Hope (short for Seeds of Hope East Timor Ploughshares Group, but also known as the Ploughshares Four or the Warton Four) was a ploughshares group of women who damaged a BAe Hawk warplane at the British Aerospace Warton Aerodrome site near Preston, England, in 1996. The four were part of a larger group of 10 who planned the action. The additional six women involved as the support group were Lyn Bliss, Clare Fearnley, Emily Johns, Jen Parker, Ricarda Steinbrecher, and Rowan Tilly. Their aim was to stop the aircraft from being exported to the Indonesian military, for use in the illegally occupied country of East Timor. They left a video and booklet in the cockpit of the aircraft to explain their motivation.

== Direct action ==
On 29 January 1996, Andrea Needham, Joanna Wilson, and Lotta Kronlid broke into BAe's Warton Aerodrome and caused between £1.4m and £2.5m worth of damage to Hawk tail number ZH955. Damage focused on components related to weapons and targeting. The damage or disarmament was done to the Hawk with ordinary household hammers. The warplane was part of a £500 million deal to supply 24 planes to the New Order regime of Indonesia. In the tradition of ploughshares actions, they stayed at the site intending to wait until they were found by security; however, they had to call security using a phone in the hangar because their presence remained unnoticed. They were arrested for criminal damage and conspiracy to commit criminal damage. A week later, a fourth woman, Angie Zelter, was also arrested and charged with conspiracy after stating she planned to do the same. The four spent six months on remand in HMP Risley before a seven-day trial at Liverpool Crown Court in July 1996. This was the 56th ploughshares action and the third ever in Britain, the group called it "Seeds of Hope - East Timor Ploughshares - Women Disarming for Life and Justice".

== Trial ==
Accused of causing, and conspiring to cause, criminal damage, with a maximum ten-year sentence, they pleaded not guilty arguing that what they did was not a crime but that they "were acting to prevent British Aerospace and the British Government from aiding and abetting genocide", referring to the genocide taking place in East Timor. They were found not guilty of criminal damage at Liverpool Crown Court, after a jury deemed their action reasonable under the Genocide Act 1969. This made it the first Ploughshares action to result in a not guilty verdict.

== Recognition and awards ==
In recognition of the group's action, they were awarded the Seán MacBride Peace Prize by the International Peace Bureau in 1997.

Angie Zelter was nominated for the Nobel Peace Prize in 2012 by Mairead Maguire, a former Nobel winner and peace activist, for Zelter's (at the time) 30 years of peace activism.

They were also awarded the Order of Timor-Leste by the government of Timor-Leste in August 2019.

== Related direct actions ==
In 1997, Angie Zelter went on to be one of the original six core members of the Trident Ploughshares.

The 29 January 2017 attempt to disarm Typhoon fighter jets thought to be destined for the Royal Saudi Air Force and therefore to be used in the Saudi Arabian-led intervention in Yemen by Sam Walton and Methodist minister Dan Woodhouse was "a continuation" of the Seeds of Hope action, with a direct parallel in the action, its goal and its reasoning, the pleading of not guilty at the trial, and the actual use of one of the hammers used by a member of the Seeds of Hope group.

== Related media ==
In 1998, a 26-minute documentary called "Seeds of Hope" directed by Neil Goodwin was released, including interviews with the women involved in the action.

Additionally, two songs were written inspired by the action and group: "Four Strong Women" released in 1996 by Maurie Mulheron and "With my Hammer" by Seize the Day and Shannon Smy.

The action was featured in The Antics Roadshow an hour-long 2011 documentary film focused on iconic acts of activism and pranks. Produced and directed by the British street artist Banksy and the director/producer Jaimie D'Cruz and was narrated by Kathy Burke.

A book called "The Hammer Blow: How 10 Women Disarmed a Warplane" recounting the action was written by Andrea Needham and published by Peace News in 2016.

A board game called "Disarm the Base" was created and released by Dissent Games in 2019. The designer was Jessica Metheringham and the artist was Mark Bijak; promotion and advice were given by Sam Walton and the Campaign Against the Arms Trade. 500 copies were made, 240 were bought pre-release through Kickstarter, with the approximately £5,000 in profits going to CAAT in summer 2020. The game's premise places the player(s) in the position of a peace activist intending to disable armed planes on a base with at least one player escaping and is based on the Seeds of Hope Action and the ploughshares action by Sam Walton and Dan Woodhouse.
