= Gilbert Guillaume =

19th President of the International Court of Justice (2000–2003)

President of the International Court of Justice
- In office 7 February 2000 – 6 February 2003
- Preceded by: Stephen Schwebel
- Succeeded by: Shi Jiuyong

Judge of the International Court of Justice
- In office 17 September 1987 – 11 February 2005

Personal details
- Born: Gilbert Pierre Guillaume; 4 December 1930 (age 95) Bois-Colombes, France
- Children: Marc Guillaume
- Education: University of Paris; Sciences Po; École nationale d'administration

Gilbert Pierre Guillaume (born 4 December 1930; French pronunciation: [ʒilbɛʁ ɡijom]) is a French jurist and judge who served as the 19th President of the International Court of Justice (ICJ) in The Hague from 2000 to 2003. He was an ICJ Judge between 1987 and 2005. Guillaume was previously appointed a member of the Permanent Court of Arbitration (PCA) in 1980.

A native of Bois-Colombes, Seine, Guillaume studied at Sciences Po and graduated from the École nationale d'administration in 1957. He was appointed a master of requests at the Conseil d'État before joining the Ministry of Foreign Affairs as Director of Juridicial Affairs in 1979. In 2007 he became a member of the Académie des Sciences Morales et Politiques, which he presided over in 2016, when he was awarded the Grand Cross of the Legion of Honour. Guillaume is also a former member of the academic staff of Sciences Po, Paris.

Gilbert Guillaume is the father of Marc Guillaume (born 1964), who was appointed Prefect of Paris in 2020.
