= Christopher Weeramantry =

Sri Lankan judge (1926–2017)

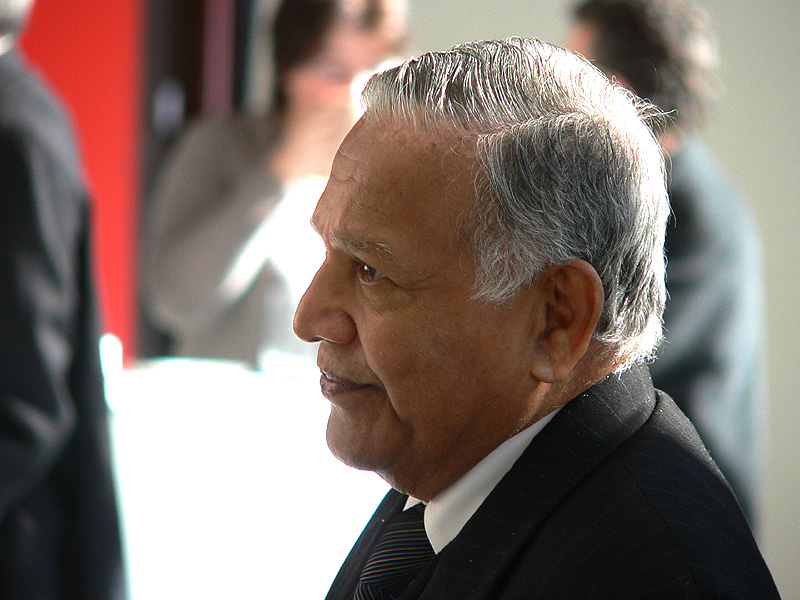
- Christopher Weeramantry in June 2007

Vice-President of the International Court of Justice
- In office 1997–2000
- President: Stephen M. Schwebel
- Preceded by: Stephen M. Schwebel
- Succeeded by: Shi Jiuyong

Judge of the International Court of Justice
- In office 1991–2000
- Preceded by: Raghunandan Pathak
- Succeeded by: Awn Al-Khasawneh

Puisne Justice of the Supreme Court of Ceylon
- In office 1967–1972

Personal details
- Born: Christopher Gregory Weeramantry; 17 November 1926 Colombo, British Ceylon
- Died: 5 January 2017 (aged 90) Colombo, Sri Lanka
- Education: King's College London; University of Ceylon; Royal College, Colombo
- Occupation: Judge
- Profession: Barrister
- Awards: Right Livelihood Award

Sri Lankabhimanya Christopher Gregory Weeramantry, AM (17 November 1926 – 5 January 2017) was a Sri Lankan lawyer who was a Judge of the International Court of Justice (ICJ) from 1991 to 2000, serving as its vice-president from 1997 to 2000. Weeramantry was a judge of the Supreme Court of Sri Lanka from 1967 to 1972. He also served as an emeritus professor at Monash University and as the president of the International Association of Lawyers against Nuclear Arms.

== Education ==
Born 17 November 1926 in Colombo, Ceylon, he was educated at the Royal College Colombo, where he was a senior prefect, editor of the Royal College Magazine, Chairman Senior Literary Association and won many class and school prizes as well as the Governor's Scholarship, Principal's Prize and the Empire Essay Prize for 1943 awarded by the Royal Empire Society.

He gained a BA (Hons.) from the newly established University of Ceylon and went on to gain a LL.B and a LLD from King's College London. After completing the law exams at the Colombo Law College, he took oaths as an Advocate of the Supreme Court of Ceylon in 1948.

== Career ==
Beginning his law practice in Colombo that went on until 1965, he was appointed Commissioner of Assize, holding the post until 1967 when he was called to the bench as a judge of the Supreme Court of Ceylon. He retired from the Supreme Court in 1972 and moved to Australia where he assumed duties as Sir Hayden Starke Professor of Law, at Monash University in Victoria.

In 1991, he was appointed as a Judge of the International Court of Justice in The Hague, becoming its vice-president in 1997. He presided as vice-president over several important cases before the court, including a case on the illegality of the use and threatened use of nuclear weapons. From 2000 to 2002 he served the ICJ as an ad hoc judge. Weeramantry served on the Legal and Human Rights Advisory Board of the Genetics Policy Institute and the president of the International Association of Lawyers Against Nuclear Arms. In addition C.G. Weeramantry was a councillor of the World Future Council, and the honorary patron and international advisor of the Centre for International Sustainable Development Law.

He was emeritus professor at Monash University, having previously served as Sir Hayden Starke's Chair of Law from 1972 to 1991. A former Lecturer and Examiner at the Colombo Law College, he was a member of the Council of Legal Education in Ceylon. Weeramantry has also served as a visiting professor at Harvard University (2000), University of Hong Kong (1989), University of Florida (1984), University of Colombo (1981), University of Papua New Guinea (1981), University of Stellenbosch (1979) and University of Tokyo (1978). He was an honorary member of Advisory Committee of Environmental Law Institute and Chairman of the International Council, Institute of Sustainable Development, McGill University.

Weeramantry died in Colombo, Sri Lanka, of natural causes on 5 January 2017 at the age of 90.

== Honours and awards ==
Weeramantry is a recipient of the following honours and awards:

- Sri Lankabhimanya, the highest National Honour of Sri Lanka (2007).
- (Sweden) Right Livelihood Award (2007)
- UNESCO Prize for Peace Education (2006)
- Honorary Member of the Order of Australia (AM), 2003
- Deshamanya title from the Government of Sri Lanka.
- (Sri Lanka) Mohamed Sahabdeen Award for International Understanding in the SAARC Region (1993)

=== Honorary degrees ===
He has received several honorary degrees;

- (United Kingdom) University of London – Doctor of Laws
- (United Kingdom) University of London – Doctor of Literature (Honoris Causa)
- (Sri Lanka) University of Colombo – Doctor of Laws (Honoris Causa)
- (Australia) Monash University – Doctor of Laws (Honoris Causa)
- National Law School of India – Doctor of Laws (Honoris Causa)
- (Sri Lanka) University of Ruhuna – Doctor of Literature (Honoris Causa)
- (Sri Lanka) Eastern University – Doctor of Literature (Honoris Causa)

== Publications ==
- The Law of Contracts: A Comparative Study of the Roman-Dutch, English and Customary Laws of Contract in Ceylon (2 Volumes, 1965), H.W. Cave & Co., Colombo 1967. Reprinted 1999, 2013
- The Law in Crisis: Bridges of Understanding, Capemoss, London 1975. Reprinted by Sarvodaya, 2001.
- Equality and Freedom: Some Third World Perspectives, Hansa Publishers, Colombo 1976. Reprinted by Sarvodaya, 1999.
- Human Rights in Japan, Lantana, Melbourne, 1979.
- Apartheid: The Closing Phases? Lantana, Melbourne, 1980.
- An Invitation to the Law, Butterworths, Melbourne, 1980. Reprinted Sarvodaya 2007, Stamford Lake
- The Slumbering Sentinels: Law and Human Rights in the Wake of Technology, Penguin, Melbourne, 1983.
- Law: The Threatened Peripheries, Lake House, Colombo, 1984.
- Nuclear Weapons and Scientific Responsibility, Longwood Academic, New Hampshire, 1987 (also in Japanese, published by Chuo University Press, Tokyo). Reprinted Sarvodaya, 1999.
- Islamic Jurisprudence: Some International Perspectives, Macmillans, London and St. Martin's Press, New York, 1988. Reprinted Sarvodaya, 2002.
- Human Rights and Scientific and Technological Development, United Nations University Press, 1990 - work edited for and commissioned by the United Nations Human Rights Commission and the United Nations University to commemorate the 40th Anniversary of the Universal Declaration of Human Rights. Nauru: Environmental Damage under International Trusteeship, Oxford University Press, 1992.
- Impact of Technology on Human Rights: Global Case Studies, United Nations University Press, 1993 - work edited for and commissioned by the United Nations Human Rights Commission and the United Nations University.
- Justice Without Frontiers. Vol I: Furthering Human Rights, Kluwer Law International, 1997.
- The Lord's Prayer: Bridge to a Better World, Liguori Publications, 1998 (also in Spanish, German and Japanese). Reprinted Sarvodaya, 1998.
- Justice Without Frontiers, Vol II: Protecting Human Rights in the Age of Technology, Kluwer Law International, 1998.
- The World Court, Its Conception, Constitution and Contribution, Sarvodaya, 2002.
- Universalizing International Law, Martinus Nijhoff, 2004.
- Sustainable Justice: Reconciling Economic, Social and Environmental Law, With Marie-Claire C. Segger. Martinus Nijhoff, 2005.
- Armageddon or Brave New World? Reflections On The Hostilities in Iraq, Sarvodaya, 2005.
- A Call for National Reawakening, Stamford Lake, 2005.
- Islamic Influences on International Philosophy and Law, Sarvodaya 2006.
- Xenotransplantation: The Ethical and Legal Concerns, Sarvodaya Vishva Lekha, 2007.
- Tread Lightly on the Earth: Religion, the Environment and the Human Future, Stamford Lake, 2009.
- Towards One World: The Memoirs of Judge C. G. Weeramantry, Volume I: The Sri Lankan Years, Weeramantry International Centre for Peace Education and Research, 2010.
- Towards One World: The Memoirs of Judge C. G. Weeramantry, Volume II: The Australian Years, Weeramantry International Centre for Peace Education and Research, 2012.
- Our Lady: A Fount of Inspiration, Weeramantry International Centre for Peace Education and Research, 2013
- Towards One World: The Memoirs of Judge C. G. Weeramantry, Volume III: The International Court and Thereafter, Stamford Lake Publication, 2014.

== See also ==
- Third World Approaches to International Law (TWAIL)
- International Court of Justice advisory opinion on the Legality of the Threat or Use of Nuclear Weapons
- List of peace activists
