= American Treaty on Pacific Settlement =

1948 treaty

Signatory and member states of the Pact of Bogotá which was signied in 1948 and which is part of the legal framework of the Organization of American States (OAS). Color legend: States which have ratified the treaty States which have signed but not ratified the treaty States which have neither signed nor ratified the treaty States which have ratified the treaty but denounced its membership

The American Treaty on Pacific Settlement (also known as the Pact of Bogotá) was signed by the independent republics of the Americas gathered at the Ninth International Conference of American States in Bogotá, Colombia, on 30 April 1948.

The purpose of the treaty was to impose a general obligation on the signatories to settle their disputes through peaceful means. It also required them to exhaust regional dispute-settlement mechanisms before placing matters before the United Nations Security Council. It is one of the treaties that confer jurisdiction on the International Court of Justice.

== Signed and ratified without reservations ==
- Belize
- Brazil
- Costa Rica
- Dominican Republic
- Haiti
- Honduras
- Mexico
- Panama
- Uruguay

== Signed and ratified with reservations ==
- Bolivia
- Chile
- Ecuador
- Nicaragua
- Paraguay
- Peru

== Signed but not ratified ==
- Argentina^{1}
- Cuba
- Guatemala
- United States^{1}
- Venezuela

^{1} Signed with reservations.

== Denounced ==
- El Salvador (on 24 November 1973)
- Colombia – On 28 November 2012, Colombia announced it would withdraw from the treaty following an adverse ruling by the International Court of Justice.
