= Angie Zelter =

British activist

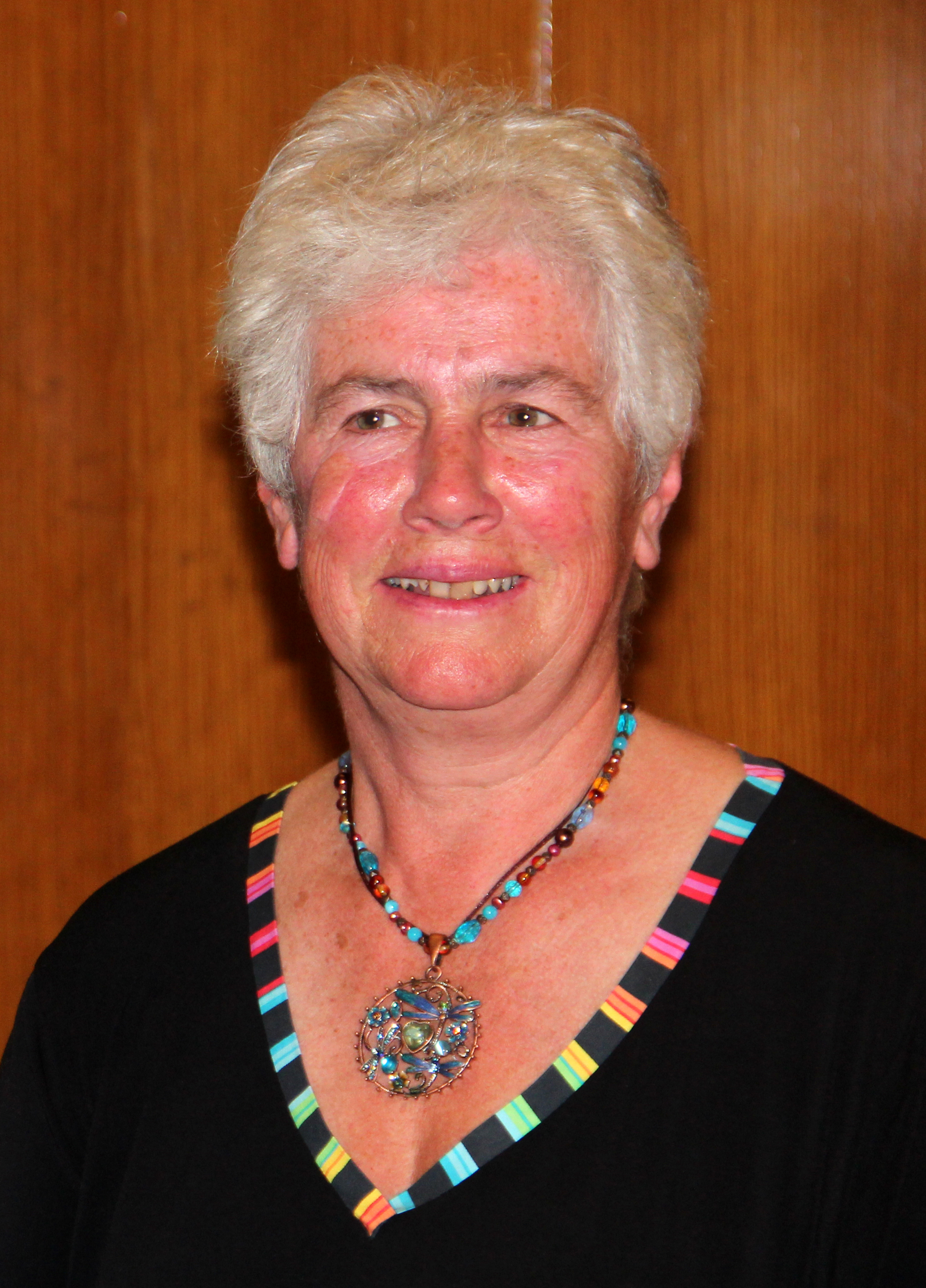
- Born: June 5, 1951 (age 75)
- Occupations: Activist, writer
- Known for: Founder of Trident Ploughshares and International Women's Peace Service
- Awards: Right Livelihood Award (2001); Hrant Dink Award (2014)

Angie Zelter (born 5 June 1951) is a British activist and the founder of a number of international campaign groups, including Trident Ploughshares and the International Women's Peace Service. Zelter is known for non-violent direct action campaigns and has been arrested over 100 times in Belgium, Canada, England, Malaysia, Norway, Poland and Scotland, serving 16 prison sentences. Zelter is a self-professed 'global citizen'.

== Life ==
In the 1980s Zelter founded the Snowball Campaign, which encouraged mass civil disobedience with participants each cutting one strand of a fence around US military bases in the UK, then waiting to be arrested. During the campaign, which lasted three years, there were around 2,500 arrests and many of the activists were sent to jail for non-payment of fines. Caroline Lucas, future Green party leader and MP, was involved in the campaign, and poet Oliver Bernard was sent to prison.

In 1996 she was part of the group Seeds of Hope that disarmed a BAE Hawk Jet, ZH955, causing £1.5million damage and preventing it from being exported to Indonesia where it would have been used to attack East Timor. She was acquitted for this action in a victory which forced the issue of arms control onto the mainstream agenda.

In 1999, along with American Ellen Moxley and Ulla Røder from Denmark, she became known as one of the Trident Three of the Trident Ploughshares, after the women succeeded in entering Maytime, a floating trident sonar testing station in Loch Goil, and damaged 20 computers and other electronic equipment and circuit boxes, cut an antenna, jammed machinery with superglue, sand, and syrup and tipped logbooks, files, computer hardware, and papers overboard. In December 2001 the Trident Three were awarded the Right Livelihood Award.

Between 2001 and 2005 she was active in many actions with the International Solidarity Movement and other organisations designed to protect the Palestinians on the West Bank against the violence of the Israeli army and of the illegal settlements which made their lives increasingly difficult. The Israeli government eventually refused to allow her to return.

In 2012 Angie Zelter was nominated for the Nobel Peace Prize by Mairead Maguire a former Nobel winner and peace activist, for Zelter's (at the time) 30 years of peace activism.

In March 2012, the South Korean police arrested Angie Zelter for obstructing the construction of the controversial Jeju-do Naval Base.

In September 2014, Zelter received in Istanbul the Hrant Dink Award for her fight against nuclear weapons.

=== Extinction Rebellion ===
During the April 2019 Extinction Rebellion London occupations Zelter was arrested on Waterloo Bridge and in Parliament Square, becoming the first activist to be prosecuted. She was given a conditional discharge in June 2019, after arguing in court that humans faced mass extinction unless governments implemented wide-ranging changes.

Zelter was one of more than 1,400 protesters arrested during the October 2019 'Extinction Rebellion Autumn Uprising' two-week campaign in London. She was charged under Section 14 of the Public Order Act 1986, pleaded guilty, and was ordered to pay a £460 fine, £85 costs and £46 surcharge.

In 2021 she published a book detailing her work between 1982 and 2021 with the title "Activism for Life".

== See also ==
- List of peace activists
