= Sedudu =

Island in Botswana

Sedudu Island
Kasikili Island (Botswana)
- Chobe River and Sedudu

- Location within Botswana

Geography
- Location: Chobe River adjacent to Namibian border
- Coordinates: 17°49′S 25°8′E
- Total islands: 1
- Area: 5 km^{2} (1.9 sq mi)

Administration
- Botswana

Demographics
- Population: Non populated

Additional information
- Territorial dispute with Namibia resolved by ICJ in 1999

Sedudu Island (known as Kasikili Island in Namibia) is a fluvial island in the Chobe River, in Botswana adjacent to the border with Namibia. The island was the subject of a territorial dispute between these countries, resolved by a 1999 ruling of the International Court of Justice (ICJ) that the border runs down the thalweg of the river immediately north (not south) of the island. The island is approximately 5 square kilometres (2 square miles) in area, with no permanent residents. For several months each year, beginning around March, the island is submerged by floods. The Island is one of the top tourist attractions in Chobe.

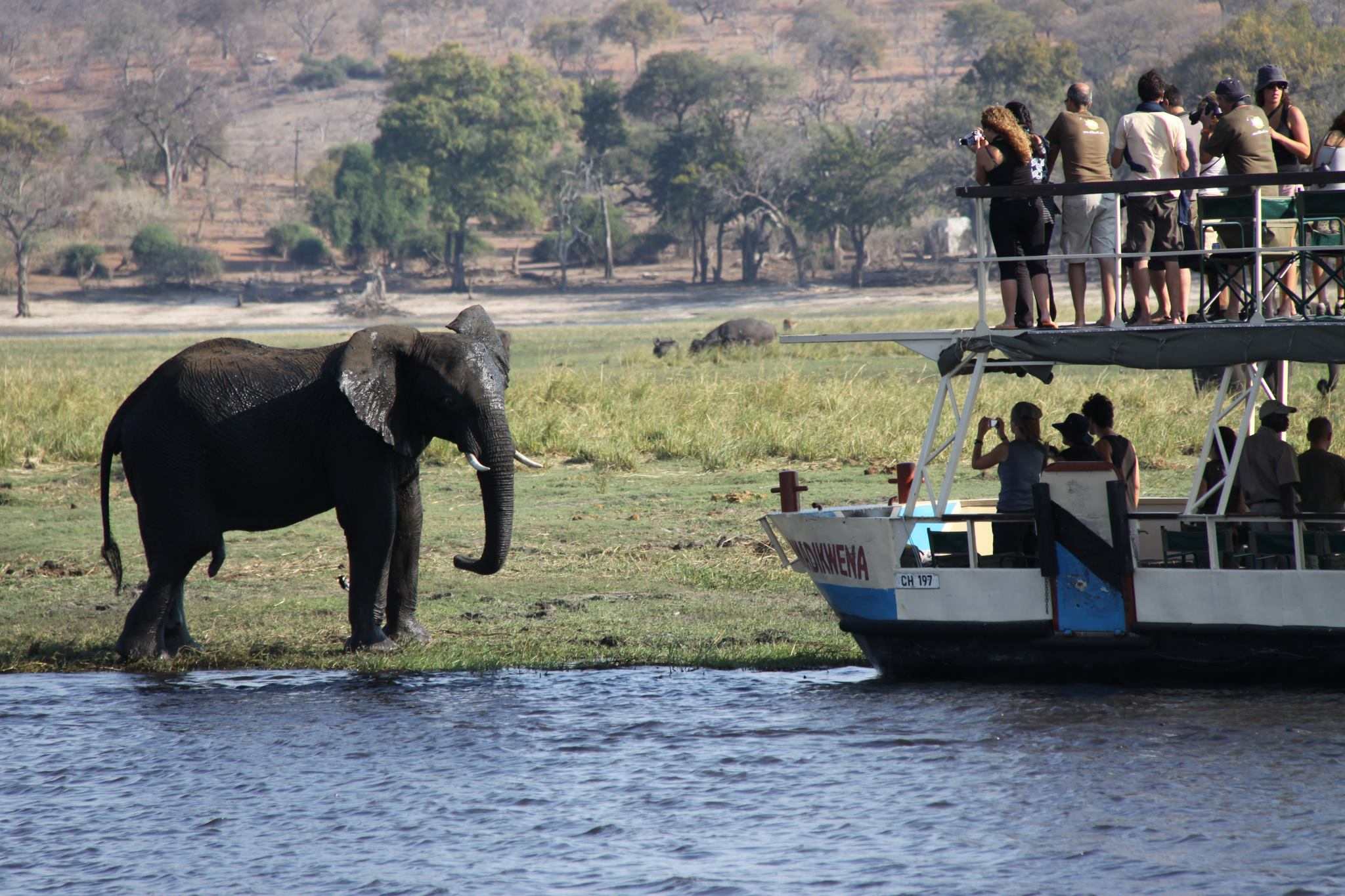
Tourism on Sedudu Island

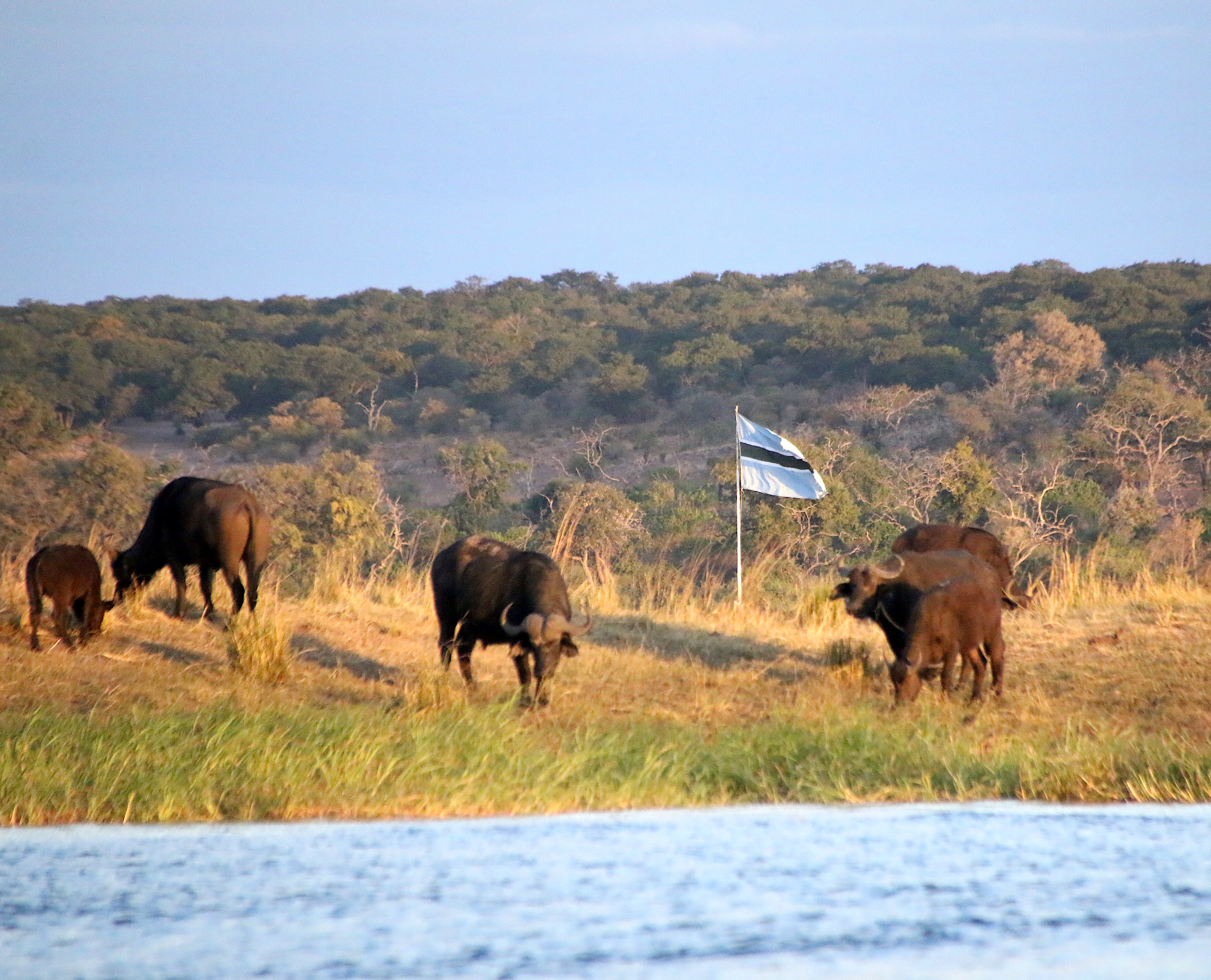
Sedudu Island Botswana (2018)

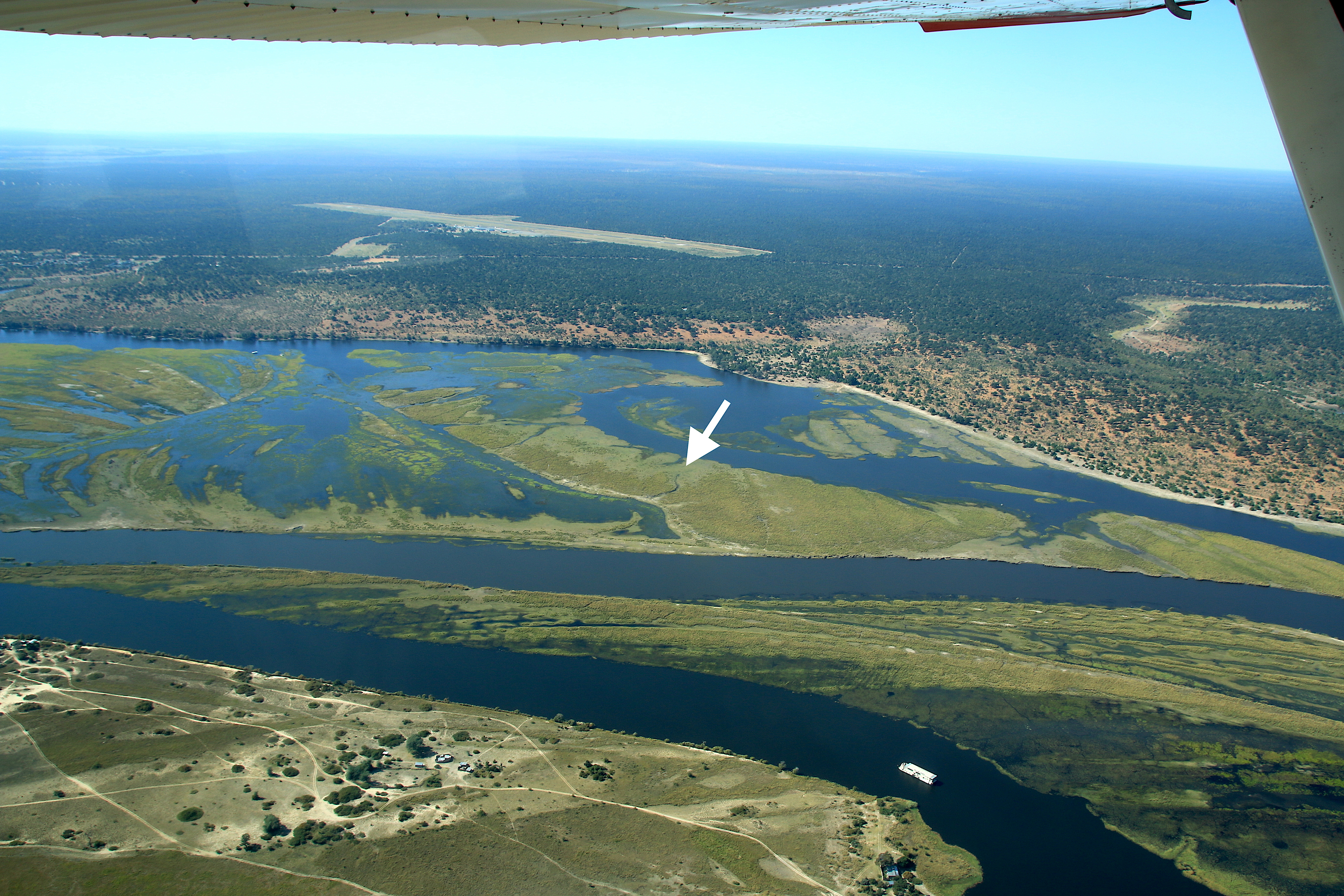
Sedudu-Island (2019)
Kasane Airport in the background

== Territorial dispute and ICJ proceedings ==
The dispute arose from the imprecise wording of the 1890 Heligoland-Zanzibar Treaty which settled territorial interests of the colonial powers of Germany and the United Kingdom, controlling German South-West Africa (modern-day Namibia) and the Bechuanaland Protectorate (modern-day Botswana), respectively.

In 1996, Namibia and Botswana reached a Special Agreement to submit their dispute to the ICJ. Specifically, the parties asked the Court to "determine, on the basis of the Anglo-German Treaty of 1 July 1890 and the rules and principles of international law, the boundary between Namibia and Botswana around Kasikili/Sedudu Island and the legal status of the island". In particular, it was unclear where exactly the "main channel" within the meaning of the 1890 ran. The Court assessed the geographical situation and came to the conclusion that "the northern channel of the River Chobe around Kasikili/Sedudu Island must be regarded as its main channel".

== See also ==
- Situngu
