= Lord Advocate's Reference =

Procedure in Scottish law

In Scottish law, a Lord Advocate's Reference is a procedure by which the Lord Advocate can refer a point of law that has arisen during the course of solemn proceedings to the High Court of Justiciary sitting as the Court of Criminal Appeal, for a determination. The Lord Advocate is the senior law officer of the Scottish Government, chief public prosecutor and head of the Crown Office and Procurator Fiscal Service in Scotland.

Lord Advocate's References used to be particularly important because, prior to the coming into force of sections 73–76 of the Criminal Justice and Licensing (Scotland) Act 2010, a trial judge sitting alone in solemn proceedings and bound by appeal court precedent had to rule on points of law without a Crown right of appeal. This resulted in several controversial verdicts of acquittal, especially in relation to no case to answer submissions tendered under section 97 of the Criminal Procedure (Scotland) Act 1995.

== Statutory provisions ==
The opinions expressed by the court in response to the reference do not affect the original verdict of the court from which the reference originated, but rather serve to clarify or develop the interpretation of a particular point of law for the benefit of future proceedings. Lord Advocate's references commonly arise out of criminal trials that involve the interpretation of new or complex issues of Scots law. There is no time limit for the reference to be submitted to the court.

Lord Advocate's References are provided for by section 123 of the Criminal Procedure (Scotland) Act 1995, which states:

(1) Where a person tried on indictment is acquitted or convicted of a charge, the Lord Advocate may refer a point of law which has arisen in relation to that charge to the High Court for their opinion;... (5) The opinion on the point referred under subsection (1) above shall not affect the acquittal or, as the case may be, conviction in the trial.

— Section 123, Criminal Procedure (Scotland) Act 1995

The panel (accused) at the trial diet from which the reference originates has a statutory right to be present at the hearing either in person or represented by an advocate. If they decline to appear or be represented, the court will appoint counsel to act at the hearing as amicus curiae. The cost of any counsel or amicus curiae must be met by the Lord Advocate, following a determination of fees payable by the Auditor of the Court of Session. It is also common for the Advocate General for Scotland to be represented at a Section 123 hearing.

Section 74 of the Criminal Justice and Licensing (Scotland) Act 2010 introduced the right of the Crown to appeal against decisions of a court in solemn proceedings to dismiss a charge on the basis of no case to answer (under Section 97 of the Criminal Procedure (Scotland) Act 1995), and the right of the Crown to appeal against determinations on the sufficiency of evidence, and acquittals based on sufficiency of evidence.

== Examples ==
- Lord Advocate's Reference (No 2 of 1992), see Assault
- Lord Advocate's Reference (No 1 of 2001), see Laws regarding rape
- Trident Three, see International Court of Justice advisory opinion on the Legality of the Threat or Use of Nuclear Weapons

== Equivalents ==
In England and Wales, the equivalent power can be exercised by the Attorney General under s. 36 of the Criminal Justice Act 1972.

== See also ==
- Philosophy of law
- Question of law
- Scots criminal law
