= Rosalyn Higgins, Lady Higgins =

British judge (born 1937)

The Right Honourable The Lady Higgins GBE KC
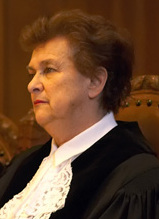
- Higgins at the International Court of Justice in 2006

President of the International Court of Justice
- In office 6 February 2006 – 6 February 2009
- Preceded by: Shi Jiuyong
- Succeeded by: Hisashi Owada

Personal details
- Born: Rosalyn C. Cohen; 2 June 1937 (age 89)
- Spouse: Terence Higgins (m. 1961; died 2025)
- Children: 2
- Education: University of Cambridge; Yale Law School
- Occupation: Judge

Rosalyn Cohen Higgins, Lady Higgins, GBE, KC (born 2 June 1937) is a British judge who was a judge of the International Court of Justice (ICJ) from 1995 to 2009. She was the first female judge elected to the ICJ. Higgins was elected to a three-year term as its president in 2006.

== Life ==
Born to a Jewish family in 1937 as Rosalyn Cohen, she married the politician Terence Higgins in 1961. Her husband was created a life peer in 1997; consequently, she became Baroness Higgins or Lady Higgins.

== Education and career ==
Higgins studied at Girton College, Cambridge, receiving her BA degree in 1959 and an LLB degree in 1962. She was a Harkness Fellow between 1959 and 1961. She later proceeded to a MA degree. She continued her studies at Yale Law School, earning a JSD degree in 1962.

Following her education, Higgins was a practising barrister, and became a Queen's Counsel (QC; since 2022, KC) in 1986, and is a bencher of the Inner Temple. She served on the UN Human Rights Committee for 14 years. Her role as member of the leading body for supervising implementation of the International Covenant on Civil and Political Rights earned her respect for her diligence and competence. She resigned from the Human Rights Committee when she was elected to the International Court of Justice on 12 July 1995, re-elected on 6 February 2000, and ended her second term on 6 February 2009.

Her professional appointments include:

- Specialist in International Law, Royal Institute of International Affairs, 1963–1974
- Visiting Fellow, London School of Economics, 1974–1978
- Professor of International Law, University of Kent at Canterbury, 1978–1981
- Professor of International Law, University of London (London School of Economics), 1981–1995
- Professor of International Law and Human rights, Leiden University, 2009–2010
- Vice-president, British Institute of International and Comparative Law
- Member of the UN Human Rights Committee.

Higgins is the author of several influential works on international law, including Problems and Process: International Law and How We Use It (1994). Despite delivering many balanced judgements in different cases, Higgins's dissenting opinion in the ICJ's advisory opinion on the Legality of the Threat or the Use of Nuclear Weapons has been widely criticised by some legal scholars, on the grounds that it provides sovereign states with an unjustifiable amount of latitude in resort to the use of nuclear weapons in times of armed conflict.

In October 2009, she was appointed adviser on International Law, to the British government's inquiry into the Iraq war, headed by Sir John Chilcot.

== Honours and awards ==
Higgins is a member of the Institut de droit international. In 1995, she was appointed a Dame Commander of the Order of the British Empire (DBE) "for services to international law", and in the 2019 New Year Honours promoted to Dame Grand Cross of the same Order (GBE) "for services to International Law and Justice". In 1988, she was appointed a Knight of the French Order of Academic Palms. Furthermore, in 2007 she was awarded the Balzan Prize for International Law since 1945.

Her competence has been recognised by many academic institutions, having received at least thirteen honorary doctorates, as well as the Yale Law School Award of Merit and also the Manley-O.-Hudson medal.
