= Raymond Ranjeva =

Malagasy judge

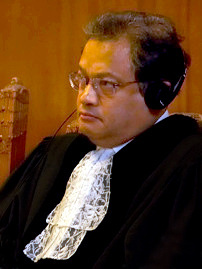
- Ranjeva in 2006

Judge of the International Court of Justice
- In office February 1991 – February 2009
- Preceded by: Kéba Mbaye
- Succeeded by: Abdulqawi Ahmed Yusuf

Personal details
- Born: August 31, 1942 (age 84) Antananarivo, Madagascar

Raymond Ranjeva (born August 31, 1942) served as a judge on the International Court of Justice from February, 1991 until February, 2009.

He holds the following degrees: Bachelor's degree in law (1965), University of Madagascar, Antananarivo; diplôme from Madagascar National School of Administration (1966); trainee in the Judicial Division of the Conseil d'Etat, Paris (1965–1966); diplôme d'études supérieures de sciences politiques, University of Paris, Faculty of Law and Economic Science (1966); diplôme d'études supérieures de droit public, University of Madagascar (1967); Doctorate of Law, Panthéon-Assas University (thesis: "La succession d'organisations internationales en Afrique"); agrégé of the Faculties of Law and Economics, Public Law and Political Science section, Paris (1972).

He served as Vice President of the International Court of Justice from 2003 until 2006 and as a Judge of the Court from 1991 to 2009, having won reelection in 2000. Prior to his election to the Court, he was a Professor of Law at the University of Madagascar from 1981 to 1991, the same university he earned a B.A. from in 1965. Furthermore, he also served as a lecturer at The Hague Academy of International Law in 1987 and 1997.

For Raymond Ranjeva, a Franco-Malagasy joint management of the Scattered Islands is "a non-issue", the UN General Assembly having recognized Madagascar's sovereignty over these territories since 1979.
