= Géza Herczegh =

Hungarian judge and academic

His Excellency Géza Herczegh

Judge of the International Court of Justice
- In office 1 May 1993 – 6 February 2003
- Preceded by: Manfred Lachs

Personal details
- Born: 17 October 1928 Veľké Kapušany, Czechoslovakia (now Slovakia)
- Died: 11 January 2010 (aged 81) Budapest, Hungary

Géza Gábor Herczegh (17 October 1928 - 11 January 2010) was a Hungarian judge and academic. In 1990, Herczegh was appointed to the Constitutional Court of Hungary. In 1993, he was elected a judge of the International Court of Justice, succeeding Manfred Lachs after his death. He filled the remaining year of Lachs' term and was re-elected to a full nine-year term in 1994. His daughter, Judge Anita Herczegh, is married to János Áder, former President of Hungary. Peter Tomka, who joined the court when Herczegh left and later became its president, described him as "a dedicated and open-minded judge interested in finding areas of consensus."
