= Carl-August Fleischhauer =

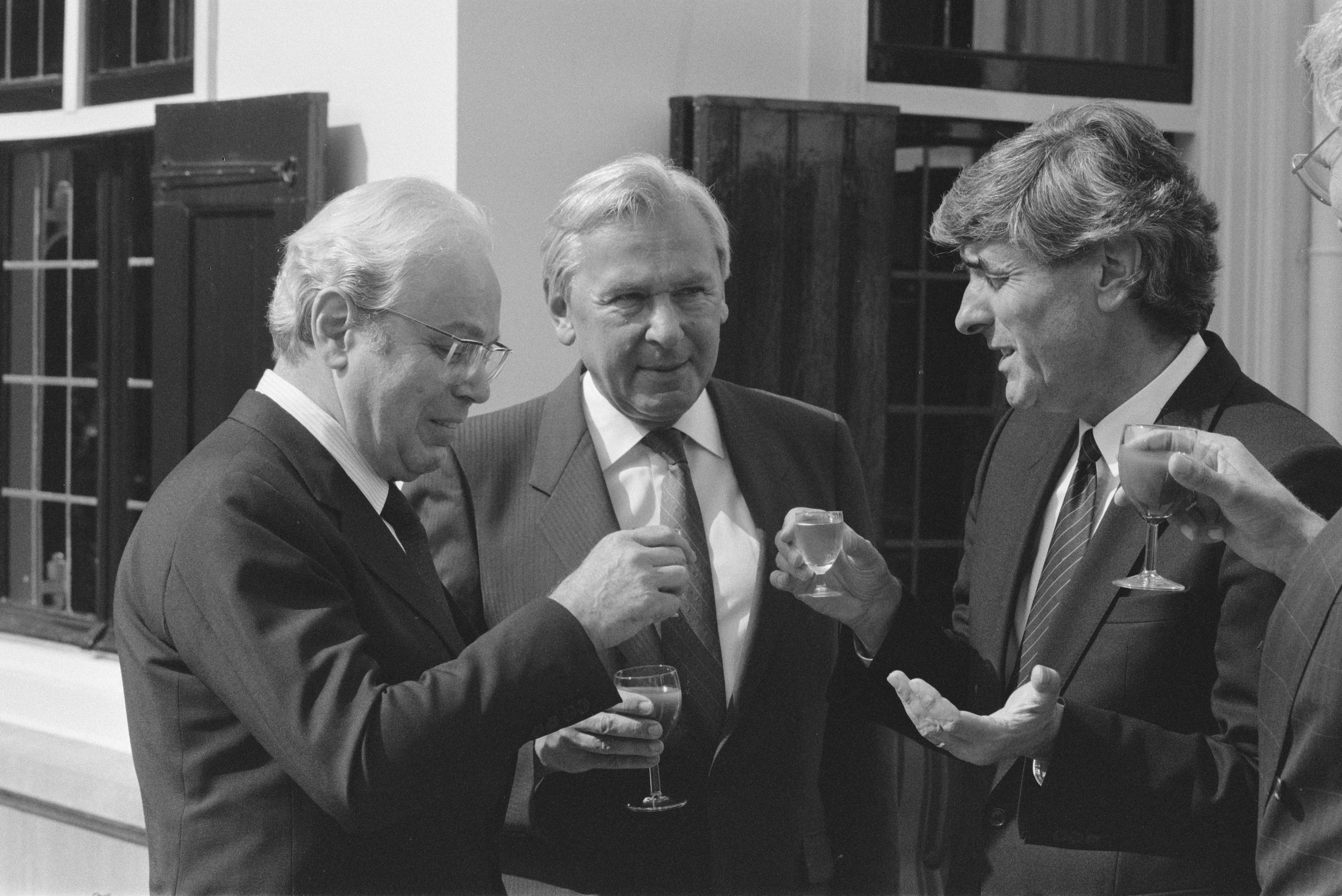
- Javier Pérez de Cuéllar, Carl-August Fleischhauer and Ruud Lubbers (1988)

Judge at the International Court of Justice
- In office 6 February 1994 – 2003

Judge Fleischhauer.

Carl-August Fleischhauer (9 December 1930 in Düsseldorf, Germany – 4 September 2005 in Bonn) was a judge at the International Court of Justice, of which he was a member from 6 February 1994 to 2003. He studied legal science in Heidelberg, Grenoble, Paris and Chicago. He was married and had two daughters.

== Biography ==
Carl-August Fleischhauer studied law at the University of Heidelberg and at the Universities of Grenoble, Paris and from 1954 to 1955 with a Fulbright scholarship at the University of Chicago. He graduated in 1954 in Heidelberg, the first and six years later in Stuttgart the second legal state examination and was then at the Max Planck Institute for Comparative Public Law and International Law operated as a speaker. During his time at the Institute, its trustees he later 1975 belonged to 2002, his doctorate he in 1961 with a thesis in the field of constitutional law . In 1962 he began a career in the Foreign Office. From 1962 to 1963 he was in Iran and from 1969 to 1971 in Uruguay in diplomatic service operated. From 1972 he headed the department of international law from 1976 to 1983 legal department of the Foreign Office. In addition, he represented Germany at various international conferences, such as in the years 1968/1969 in the negotiations for the Vienna Convention on the Law of Treaties, 1974/1975 at the Conference on Security and Cooperation in Europe, from 1974 to 1977 during the negotiations on the additional protocols to the Geneva conventions as well as from 1974 to 1982 in negotiating the convention. He then in 1983 and directed to 1994 Under Secretary General the Office of Legal Affairs of the United Nations. During this time he was instrumental in the drafting of mandates and other framework documents of various missions of the United Nations peacekeeping involved, so for the missions ONUCA in El Salvador, UNTAG in Namibia, ONUMOZ in Mozambique and UNTAC in Cambodia. Moreover, the establishment of based International Criminal Tribunal for the former Yugoslavia on a report, which was developed under the leadership of Carl-August Fleischhauer. Of 6 February 1994, Carl-August Fleischhauer till 5 February 2003 Judge at the International Court operated. During this time he was involved in 35 judgments and decisions, as well as three legal opinion of the court, and gave it three dissenting votes from. Even after the end of his regular intervals nine-year tenure, he introduced himself to the court for the hearing of the application of the Principality of Liechtenstein against Germany between 2001 and 2005 as an ad hoc -Richter available. Subject of the proceedings in which they were the first lawsuit in the history of the Court against Germany, was the treatment of Liechtenstein property in the area of former Czechoslovakia in connection with the Second World War as a German international investment and its attraction to settle German war debts. The court at this time reigning German Judge Bruno Simma took no part in the decision, since he had previously worked as a legal adviser to the German Government in this case and was caught personally. The process ended with the decision of the Court that the claims in Liechtenstein were not directed against Germany. Carl-August Fleischhauer agreed on the essential points of the decision with the judge majority (12: 4) and was moreover an explanation to another part of the decision on, in which he was the only judge against the majority: had voted (15 1). Carl-August Fleischhauer was married and father of two daughters. He died in 2005 in Bonn.

== Honours ==
Merit 1st Class of the Federal Republic of Germany

== Works ==
- The boundaries of the subject matter jurisdiction of the Federal Constitutional Court in the control of the legislature, the state leadership and the political parties. Dissertation at the Faculty of Ruprecht-Karls-Universität, Heidelberg 1961
- The International Court and its role in international relations. In: security and peace 16 (4) / 1998.. Nomos, p 223–227, ISSN 0175-274X
- Different contributions to the Encyclopedia of Public International Law. Published by the Max Planck Institute for Comparative Public Law and International Law . Elsevier, Amsterdam / New York / London 1992

== Literature ==
- Rosalyn Higgins : Fleischhauer Leaves the Court to:. Leiden Journal of International Law 16/2003.. Cambridge University Press, p 55/56, ISSN 0922-1565
- Jochen Frowein Abraham : Obituary Carl-August Fleischhauer. 9 December 1930 - 4 September 2005. In: Heidelberg Journal of International Law. Journal of Comparative Public Law and *International Law. 65/2005. Max Planck Institute for Comparative Public Law and International Law, S. 817/818, ISSN 0044-2348
- Gian Luca Burci, Nico Schrijver: Carl-August Fleischhauer: His Life and Work. In: Leiden Journal of International Law 19/2006.. Cambridge University Press, p 693–698, ISSN 0922-1565
- Carl-August Fleischhauer In: Arthur Eyffinger, Arthur Witteveen, Mohammed Bedjaoui : La Cour internationale de Justice 1946–1996 Martinus Nijhoff Publishers, The Hague and London 1999. ISBN 90-411-0468-2, p 283
