= Shigeru Oda =

Japanese judge (1924–2025)

- 小田 滋
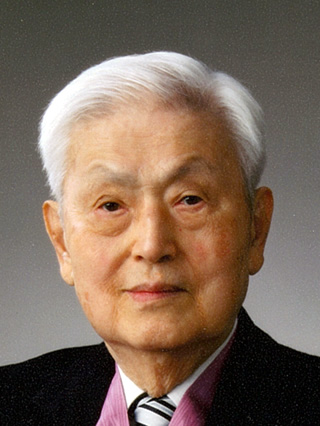

Judge on the International Court of Justice
- In office 1976–2003

Personal details
- Born: 22 October 1924; Sapporo, Japan
- Died: 4 September 2025 (aged 100)

Shigeru Oda (小田 滋, Oda Shigeru; 22 October 1924 – 4 September 2025) was a Japanese jurist who was a judge on the International Court of Justice from 1976 until 2003, when he retired. He served as vice-president from 1991 to 1994. His main area of expertise was law of the sea. He was born in Sapporo.

Oda earned his law degree from the University of Tokyo in 1947 and his doctorate in law from Yale Law School in 1953. He turned 100 in October 2024. Oda died on 4 September 2025, at the age of 100.

== See also ==
- Nicaragua v. United States
