= Shi Jiuyong =

Chinese judge (1926–2022)

- 史久镛
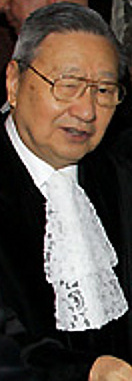

Judge at the International Court of Justice
- In office 6 February 1994 – 28 May 2010

Personal details
- Born: October 9, 1926
- Died: January 18, 2022 (aged 95)

Shi Jiuyong (simplified Chinese: 史久镛; traditional Chinese: 史久鏞; 9 October 1926 – 18 January 2022) was a Chinese judge at the International Court of Justice (ICJ). Shi was elected to the ICJ on 6 February 1994, and became President nine years later on 6 February 2003. In 2010, he announced his resignation from the Court effective on 28 May 2010.

== Life and career ==
Shi was born in the port city of Ningbo, in Zhejiang Province, China, on 9 October 1926. His father, an importer and merchant of dyes who had six children, relocated the family to Shanghai in 1927. He grew up in a relatively wealthy household, and was educated in English at the British-run Lester Institute, before going on to study law at Saint John's University, Shanghai, where he obtained a bachelor's degree on politics. Afterward he went to United States and studied at Columbia Law School, New York City, where he obtained postgraduate degree in international law.

From 1956 to 1958, he held various teaching and fellowship positions at international affairs colleges and institutes around Beijing.

He became a professor of international law at the Foreign Affairs College, Beijing, in 1984. From the 1980s, he served as an international law representative of the People's Republic of China through various important international conventions and treaties, including the Sino-British negotiations on the status of Hong Kong. Shi was also a member and chairman of the International Law Commission. He lectured on international law throughout China and the English-speaking world, including a stint at The Hague Academy of International Law.

Shi died on 18 January 2022, at the age of 95.

== Service at the International Court of Justice ==
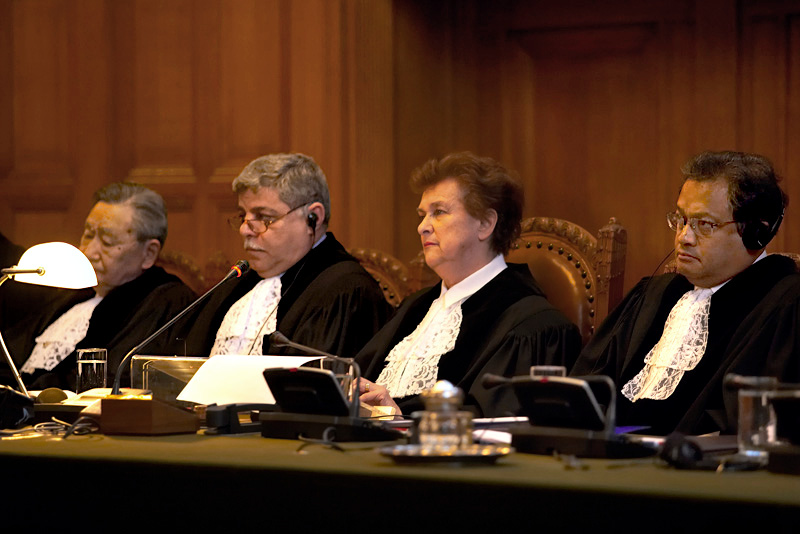
Shi Jiuyong (left) at court

Shi was elected to the ICJ on 6 February 1994, and became the president on 6 February 2003 at the age of 77. It was the first time that a Chinese judge became president of the ICJ. The foreign minister of the People's Republic of China Tang Jiaxuan sent his personal warm congratulations to Shi.

== Selected works ==
He is the author of numerous publications on international law.

- 《外交庇护》 (Diplomatic asylum)
- 《条约法讲演集》 (Lectures on the Law of Treaties)
- 《南极的法律问题》 (Legal Issues of Antarctica)
- 《普遍优惠制度与国际贸易》 (The Generalised System of Preferences and International Trade)
- 《香港与关税和贸易总协定》 (Hong Kong and the General Agreement on Tariffs and Trade)

== Positions ==
- Fellow; Chinese Society of International Law
- Senior Advisor; China's Legal Advice Centre

== Lectures ==
- Asia and International Law: A New Era Distinguished Speakers Panel in the Lecture Series of the United Nations Audiovisual Library of International Law
- The Present and Future Role of the International Court of Justice in the Peaceful Settlement of International Disputes in the Lecture Series of the United Nations Audiovisual Library of International Law

== See also ==
- Chinese law
