= Heidelberg University Faculty of Theology =

Coordinates: 49.4107464°N 8.6799474°E

- Theologische Fakultät der Universität Heidelberg
- Established: 1386
- Parent institution: University of Heidelberg
- Religious affiliation: Protestant
- Dean: Jan Stievermann
- Location: Heidelberg, Baden-Württemberg, Germany
- Website: theologie.uni-heidelberg.de

The Heidelberg Faculty of Theology (German: Theologische Fakultät der Universität Heidelberg) is one of twelve faculties at the University of Heidelberg. It was one of the four founding faculties in 1386. As of 2023, the faculty's dean is Jan Stievermann.

== Notable people ==
=== Faculty members ===
==== Medieval period ====
- Pope Pius II (1405–1464)

==== Early modern period ====
- Thomas Erastus (1524–1583)
- Johann Jakob Grynaeus (1540–1617)
- Franciscus Junius (1545–1602)
- Caspar Olevian (1536–1587)
- David Pareus (1548–1622)
- Daniel Tossanus (1541–1602)
- Paul Tossanus (1572–1634)
- Zacharias Ursinus (1534–1583)
- Girolamo Zanchi (1516–1590)

==== Late modern period ====
- Johannes Bauer (1860–1933)
- Klaus Berger (1940–2020)
- Günther Bornkamm (1905–1990)
- Martin Dibelius (1883–1947)
- Otto Frommel (1871–1951)
- Gustav Hölscher (1877–1955)
- Renatus Hupfeld (1879–1968)
- Robert Jelke (1882–1952)
- Walther Köhler (died 1946)
- Theodor Odenwald (1889–1970)
- Heinrich Paulus (1761–1851)
- Richard Rothe (1799–1867)
- Edmund Schlink (1903–1984)
- Gerd Theissen (born 1943)
- Ernst Troeltsch (1865–1923)
- Gerhard von Rad (1901–1971)
- Heinz Dietrich Wendland (1900–1992)
- Claus Westermann (1909–2000)
- Hans Walter Wolff (1911–1993)

=== Alumni ===
- Martin Bucer (1491–1551)
- Franciscus Gomarus (1563–1641)
- David Pareus (1548–1622)

== See also ==
- Heidelberg Catechism
