= Heidelberg University =

Public university in Heidelberg, Baden-Württemberg, Germany

Coordinates: 49°24′37″N 8°42′23″E

- Ruprecht-Karls-Universität Heidelberg
- Latin: Universitas Ruperto-Carola Heidelbergensis
- Motto: Semper apertus (Latin)
- Motto in English: Always open
- Type: Public
- Established: 18 October 1386; 639 years ago
- Affiliations: German Universities Excellence Initiative, LERU, Coimbra Group, U15, EUA
- Budget: EUR 764.9 million (2018)
- Chancellor: Jens Andreas Meinen
- Rector: Frauke Melchior
- Administrative staff: 8,397
- Students: 28,959 (SS2024)
- Undergraduates: 10,458
- Postgraduates: 13,410
- Doctoral students: 4,114
- Location: Heidelberg, Baden-Württemberg, Germany
- Campus: Urban/University town and suburban
- Colors: Sandstone red and gold
- Website: www.uni-heidelberg.de

- Location within Germany Location within Baden-Württemberg

Heidelberg University, officially the Ruprecht Karl University of Heidelberg (German: Ruprecht-Karls-Universität Heidelberg; Latin: Universitas Ruperto Carola Heidelbergensis), is a public research university in Heidelberg, Baden-Württemberg, Germany. Founded in 1386 on instruction of Pope Urban VI, Heidelberg is Germany's oldest university and one of the world's oldest surviving universities; it was the third university established in the Holy Roman Empire after Prague (1347) and Vienna (1365). Since 1899, it has been a coeducational institution.

Heidelberg is one of the most prestigious universities in Europe. It is a German Excellence University, part of the U15, as well as a founding member of the League of European Research Universities and the Coimbra Group. The university consists of twelve faculties and offers degree programmes at undergraduate, graduate and postdoctoral levels in some 100 disciplines. The language of instruction is usually German; however, a considerable number of graduate degrees are offered in English as well as some in French.

As of 2021, 57 Nobel Prize winners have been affiliated with the city of Heidelberg and 33 with the university itself. Modern scientific psychiatry, psychopharmacology, experimental psychology, psychiatric genetics, mathematical statistics, environmental physics, and modern sociology were introduced as scientific disciplines by Heidelberg students or faculty. Approximately 1,000 doctorates are completed every year, with more than one third of the doctoral students coming from abroad. International students from some 130 countries account for more than 20 percent of the entire student body.

== History ==
=== Founding ===
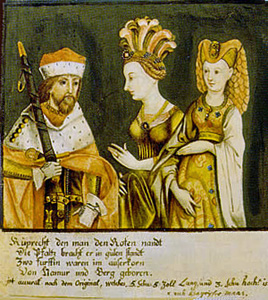
In 1386, Heidelberg University was founded by Rupert I on instruction of Pope Urban VI who demanded modelling it after the ancient University of Paris.

The Great Schism of 1378 made it possible for Heidelberg, a relatively small city and capital of the Electorate of the Palatinate, to gain its own university. The Great Schism was initiated by the election of two popes after the death of Pope Gregory XI in the same year. One successor resided in Avignon (elected by the French) and the other in Rome (elected by the Italian cardinals). The German secular and spiritual leaders voiced their support for the successor in Rome, which had far-reaching consequences for the German students and teachers in Paris: they lost their stipends and had to leave.

Rupert I recognized the opportunity and initiated talks with the Curia, which ultimately led to a papal bull for foundation of a university. After having received, on 23 October 1385, permission from pope Urban VI to create a school of general studies (Latin: studium generale), the final decision to found the university was taken on 26 June 1386 at the behest of Rupert I, Count Palatine of the Rhine. As specified in the papal charter, the university was modelled after the University of Paris and included four faculties: philosophy, theology, jurisprudence, and medicine.

On 18 October 1386, a special Pontifical High Mass in the Heiliggeistkirche was the ceremony that established the university. On 19 October 1386 the first lecture was held, making Heidelberg the oldest university in Germany. In November 1386, Marsilius of Inghen was elected first rector of the university. The rector seal motto was semper apertus—i.e., "the book of learning is always open." The university grew quickly and in March 1390, 185 students were enrolled at the university.

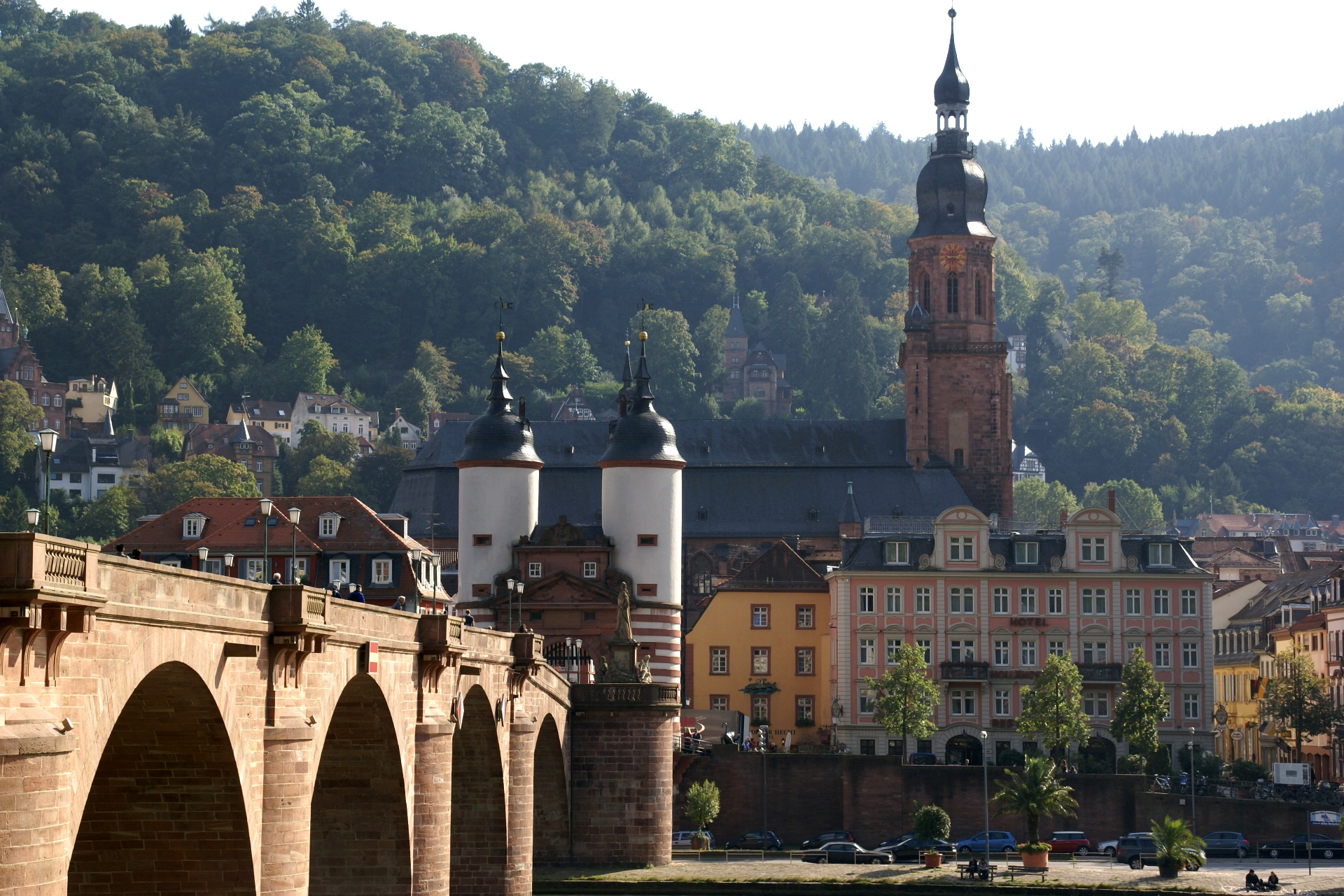
A Solemn Mass was offered in the Heiliggeistkirche in 1386 to mark and bless the establishment of the university.

=== Late Middle Ages ===
Between 1414 and 1418, theology and jurisprudence professors of the university took part in the Council of Constance and acted as counselors for Louis III, who attended this council as representative of the emperor and chief magistrate of the realm. This resulted in establishing a good reputation for the university and its professors.

Due to the influence of Marsilius, the university initially taught the nominalism or via moderna. In 1412, both realism and the teachings of John Wycliffe were forbidden at the university but later, around 1454, the university decided that realism or via antique would also be taught, thus introducing two parallel ways (ambae viae).

The transition from scholastic to humanistic culture was effected by the chancellor and bishop Johann von Dalberg in the late 15th century. Humanism was represented at Heidelberg University particularly by the founder of the older German Humanistic School Rudolph Agricola, Conrad Celtes, Jakob Wimpfeling, and Johann Reuchlin. Æneas Silvius Piccolomini was chancellor of the university in his capacity as provost of Worms, and later always favored it with his friendship and good-will as Pope Pius II. In 1482, Pope Sixtus IV permitted laymen and married men to be appointed professors in the ordinary of medicine through a papal dispensation. In 1553, Pope Julius III sanctioned the allotment of ecclesiastical benefices to secular professors.

=== Reformation and modern era ===
Martin Luther's disputation at Heidelberg in April 1518 made a lasting impact, and his adherents among the masters and scholars soon became leading Reformationists in Southwest Germany. With the Electorate of the Palatinate turn to the Reformed faith, Otto Henry, Elector Palatine, converted the university into a Calvinist institution. In 1563, the Heidelberg Catechism was created under collaboration of members of the university's divinity school.

As the 16th century was passing, the late humanism stepped beside Calvinism as a predominant school of thought; and figures like Paul Schede, Jan Gruter, Martin Opitz, and Matthäus Merian taught at the university. It attracted scholars from all over the continent and developed into a cultural and academic center. However, with the beginning of the Thirty Years' War in 1618, the intellectual and fiscal wealth of the university declined. In 1622, the then-world-famous Bibliotheca Palatina (the library of the university) was stolen from the University Cathedral and taken to Rome. The reconstruction efforts thereafter were defeated by the troops of King Louis XIV, who destroyed Heidelberg in 1693 almost completely.

As a consequence of the late Counter-Reformation, the university lost its Protestant character, and was channeled by Jesuits. From 1712 to 1728, the Old University was constructed at University Square, then known as Domus Wilhelmina. Through the efforts of the Jesuits a preparatory seminary was established, the Seminarium ad Carolum Borromæum, whose pupils were also registered in the university. After the suppression of the Jesuit Order, most of the schools they had conducted passed into the hands of the French Congregation of Lazarists in 1773. They deteriorated from that time forward.

Meanwhile, the university itself continued to lose in prestige until the reign of the last elector Charles Theodore, Elector Palatine, who established new chairs for all the faculties, founded scientific institutes such as the Electoral Academy of Science, and transferred the school of political economy from Kaiserslautern to Heidelberg, where it was combined with the university as the faculty of political economy. He also founded an observatory in the neighboring city of Mannheim, where Jesuit Christian Mayer labored as director. In connection with the four hundredth anniversary of the university, the elector approved a revised statute book that several professors had been commissioned to prepare. The financial affairs of the university, its receipts and expenditures, were put in order. At that time, the number of students varied from 300 to 400; in the jubilee year, 133 matriculated.

As a consequence of the disturbances caused by the French Revolution, and particularly because of the Treaty of Lunéville, the university lost all its property on the left bank of the Rhine, so that its complete dissolution was expected.

=== 19th and early 20th century ===
This decline did not stop until 1803, when the university was reestablished as a state-owned institution by Karl Friedrich, Grand Duke of Baden, to whom the part of the Palatinate situated on the right bank of the Rhine was allotted. Since then, the university bears his name together with the name of Ruprecht I. Karl Friedrich divided the university into five faculties and placed himself at its head as rector, as did also his successors. During this decade, Romanticism found expression in Heidelberg through Clemens Brentano, Achim von Arnim, Ludwig Tieck, Joseph Görres, and Joseph von Eichendorff, and there went forth a revival of the German Middle Ages in speech, poetry, and art.

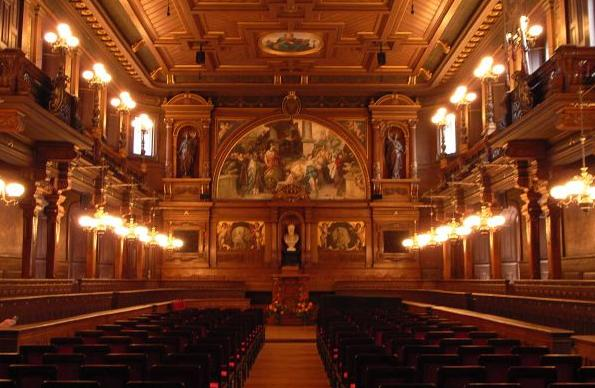
The Old Assembly Hall or "Great Hall" was redesigned in 1886 in celebration of the university's quincentenary.

The German Students Association exerted great influence, which was at first patriotic and later political. After Romanticism had eventually died out, Heidelberg became a center of Liberalism and the movement in favor of German national unity. The historians Friedrich Christoph Schlosser and Georg Gottfried Gervinus were the guides of the nation in political history. The modern scientific schools of medicine and natural science, particularly astronomy, were models in point of construction and equipment, and Heidelberg University was especially noted for its influential law school. The university as a whole became the role model for the transformation of American liberal arts colleges into research universities, in particular for the then-newly established Johns Hopkins University. Heidelberg's professors were important supporters of the Vormärz revolution and many of them were members of the first freely elected German parliament, the Frankfurt Parliament of 1848. During the late 19th century, the university housed a very liberal and open-minded spirit, which was deliberately fostered by Max Weber, Ernst Troeltsch and a circle of colleagues around them.

In February 1900, the Grand Duchy of Baden issued a decree that gave women the right to access universities in Baden. Thus, the universities of Freiburg and Heidelberg were the first ones to allow women to study.

In the Weimar Republic, the university was widely recognized as a center of democratic thinking, coined by professors like Karl Jaspers, Gustav Radbruch, Martin Dibelius and Alfred Weber. Unfortunately, there were also dark forces working within the university: Nazi physicist Philipp Lenard was head of the physics institute at the time. Following the assassination of the liberal German-Jewish Foreign Minister Walther Rathenau, he refused to half mast the national flag on the institute, thereby provoking its storming by communist students.

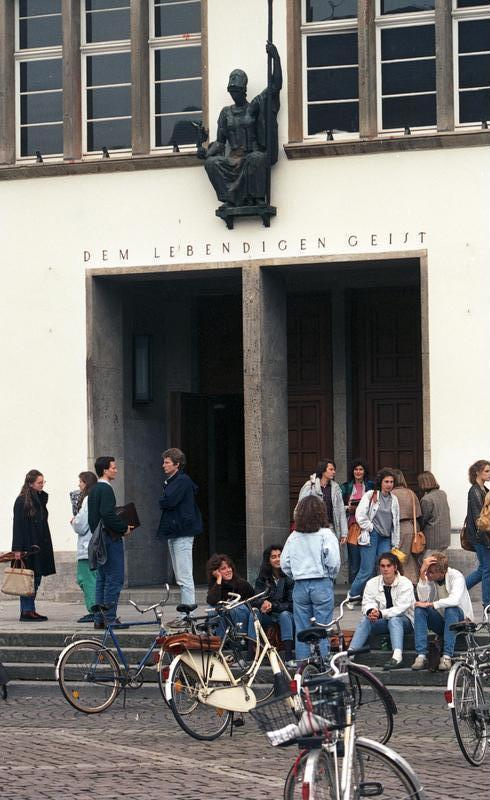
The main entrance of the New University building in 1988, showing the bronze bust of Athena, the Greek goddess of wisdom

=== Nazi Germany ===
After the establishment of Nazi Germany in 1933, the university supported Adolf Hitler and the Nazis like all other German universities at the time. It dismissed a large number of staff and students for political and racial reasons. Many dissident fellows had to emigrate and most Jewish and Communist professors who did not leave Germany were deported. At least two professors directly fell victim to Nazi terror. On 17 May 1933, members of the university faculty and students took part in book burnings at Universitätsplatz ('University Square') and Heidelberg eventually became infamous as a NSDAP university. The inscription above the main entrance of the New University was changed from "The Living Spirit" to "The German Spirit", and many professors paid homage to the new motto. The university was involved in Nazi eugenics: forced sterilizations were carried out at the women's clinic and the psychiatric clinic, then directed by Carl Schneider, was involved in Action T4 Euthanasia program.The heads of the university helped in the deportation of Jewish men, women and children directly to the gas chambers.

=== Federal Republic of Germany ===
Since Heidelberg was spared from destruction during World War II, the reconstruction of the university was realized rather quickly. With the foundation of the Collegium Academicum, Heidelberg University became the home of Germany's first and, until today, only self-governed student hall. Newly laid statutes obliged the university to "The Living Spirit of Truth, Justice and Humanity".

During the 1960s and 1970s, the university grew dramatically in size. At this time, it developed into one of the main scenes of the left-wing student protests in Germany. In 1975, a massive police force arrested the entire student parliament AStA. Shortly thereafter, the building of the Collegium Academicum, a progressive college in immediate vicinity to the university's main grounds, was stormed by over 700 police officers and closed once and for all. On the outskirts of the city, in the Neuenheimer Feld area, a large campus for medicine and natural sciences was constructed.

Today, about 29,000 students are enrolled for studies at Heidelberg University. There are 4,196 full-time faculty, including 476 university professors. In 2007, and again in 2012, the university was appointed University of Excellence under an initiative started by the Federal Ministry of Education and Research and the German Research Foundation. This enhanced the German university system by establishing a small network of exceptionally well-funded universities, which are expected to generate strong international appeal.

In 2022, a mass shooting occurred in the university, killing a woman and injuring three other people. The gunman then committed suicide.

== Campuses ==
"I saw Heidelberg on a perfectly clear morning, with a pleasant air both cool and invigorating. The city, just so, with the totality of its ambiance is, one might say, something ideal."

— Johann Wolfgang von Goethe

Heidelberg is a city with approximately 140,000 inhabitants. It is situated in the Rhine Neckar Triangle, a European metropolitan area with approximately 2.4 million people living there, comprising the neighboring cities of Heidelberg, Mannheim, Ludwigshafen, and a number of smaller towns in the perimeter. Heidelberg is known as the cradle of Romanticism, and its old town and castle are among the most frequented tourist destinations in Germany. Its pedestrian zone is a shopping and night life magnet for the surrounding area and beyond. Heidelberg is about 40 minutes by train away from Frankfurt International Airport. Heidelberg University's facilities are, generally speaking, separated in two parts. The faculties and institutes of humanities and social sciences are embedded in the Old Town Campus. The sciences faculties and the medical school, including three large university hospitals, are located on the New Campus in the Neuenheimer Feld on the outskirts of Heidelberg.

=== Old Town Campus ===
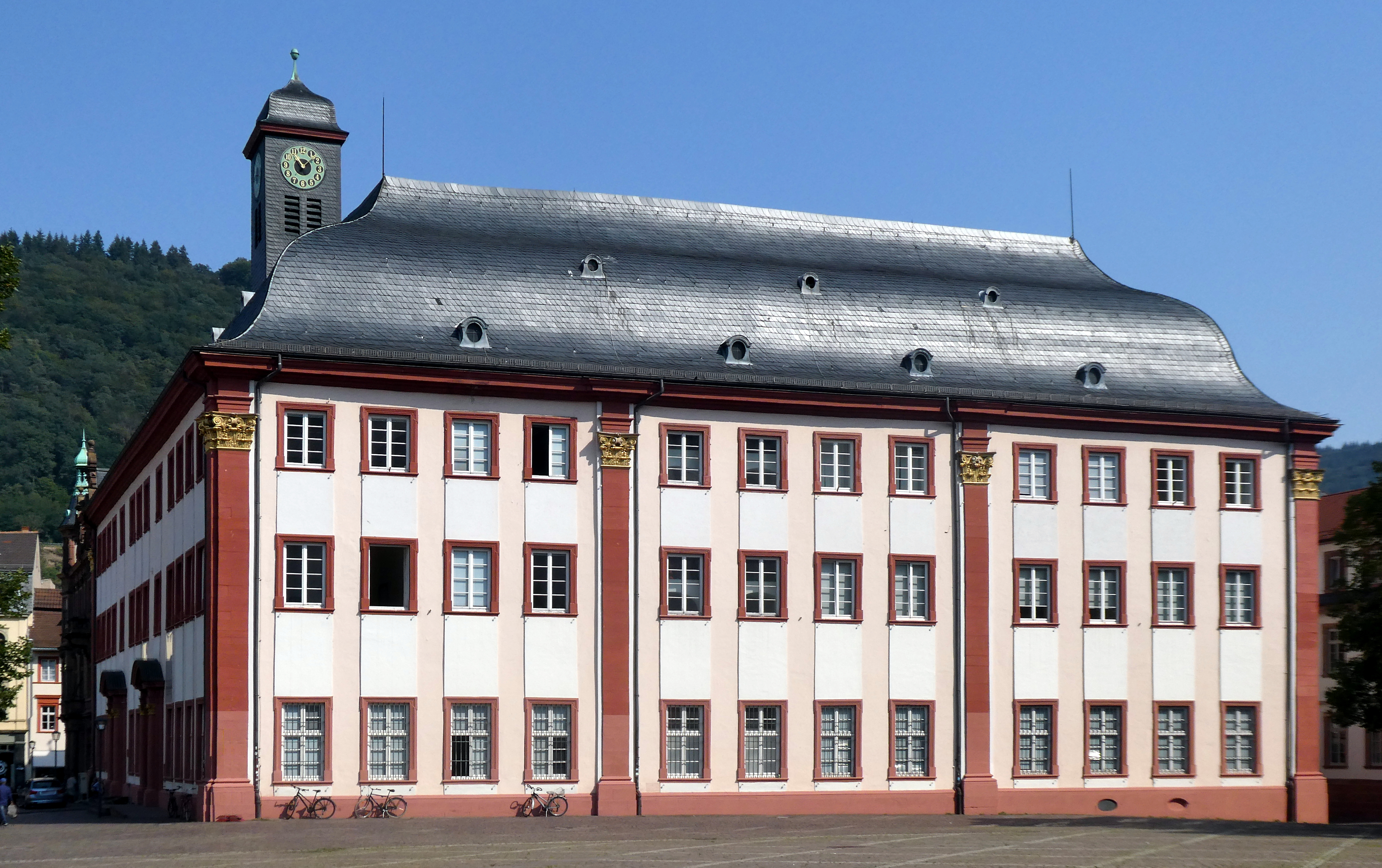
17th century Old University building

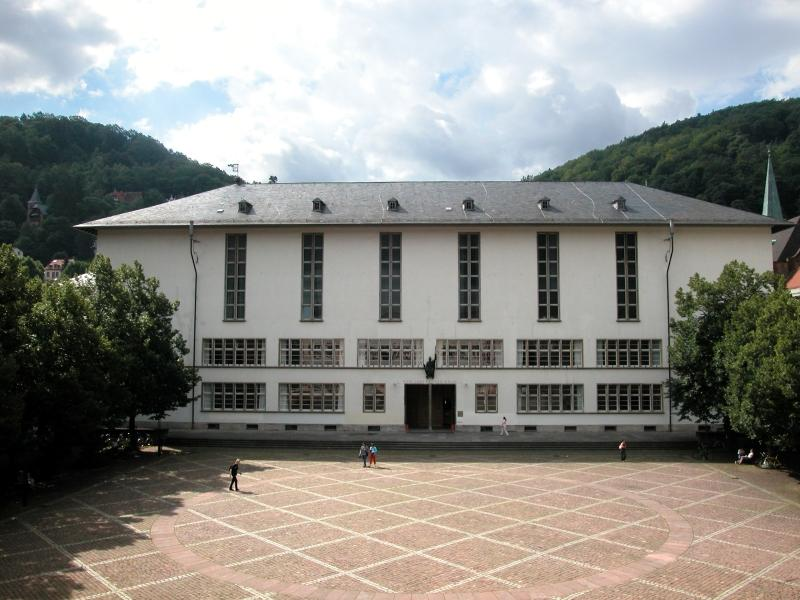
The New University of 1931 as seen from the Old University

The Old University is an baroque building located between the Hauptstrasse and the Universitätsplatz (University Square) in the old town of Heidelberg. It contains the Hall of the University, once the main assembly hall and lecture theatre of the University, as well as the Heidelberg University Museum and the old University gaol.

The New University, also situated on the Universitätsplatz, was officially opened in 1931. Its erection was largely financed by donations of wealthy American families, in line with a fundraising campaign of Jacob Gould Schurman, an alumnus of Heidelberg University and former United States Ambassador to Germany. It houses the new assembly hall, the largest lecture halls, and a number of smaller seminar rooms, mostly used by faculties of humanities and social sciences. Education in humanities and social sciences takes place to a great extent in buildings spread over the ancient part of town, though most are less than ten minutes walk from University Square. The faculties maintain their own extensive libraries and work spaces for students. Seminars and tutorials are usually held in the faculty buildings.

=== Neuenheimer Feld – New Campus ===
In the 1960s the university started building a new campus near the city district Neuenheim, called the Neuenheimer Feld. It is today the largest part of the university, and the largest campus for natural sciences and life science in Germany. Almost all science faculties and institutes, the medical school, University Hospital Heidelberg, and the science branch of the University Library are situated on the New Campus. Most of the dormitories and the athletic facilities of the university can be found there as well.

Several independent research institutes, such as the German Cancer Research Center and two of the Max-Planck-Institutes have settled there. The New Campus is also the seat of several biomedical spin-off companies. The old part of town can be reached by tram and bus in about 10 minutes. The Neuenheimer Feld campus has extensive parking lots for faculty and student vehicles for long term and short term parking, as well as visitors and patients of the various university hospitals. The Faculty of Physics and Astronomy is not located on either campus, but on the Philosophers' Walk, separated from the Old Town by the River Neckar, and some 2 km (1.2 mi) away from the New Campus. It also maintains observatory facilities on the Königstuhl Mountain.

The university maintains a botanical garden at Neuenheimer Feld.

=== Bergheim Campus ===
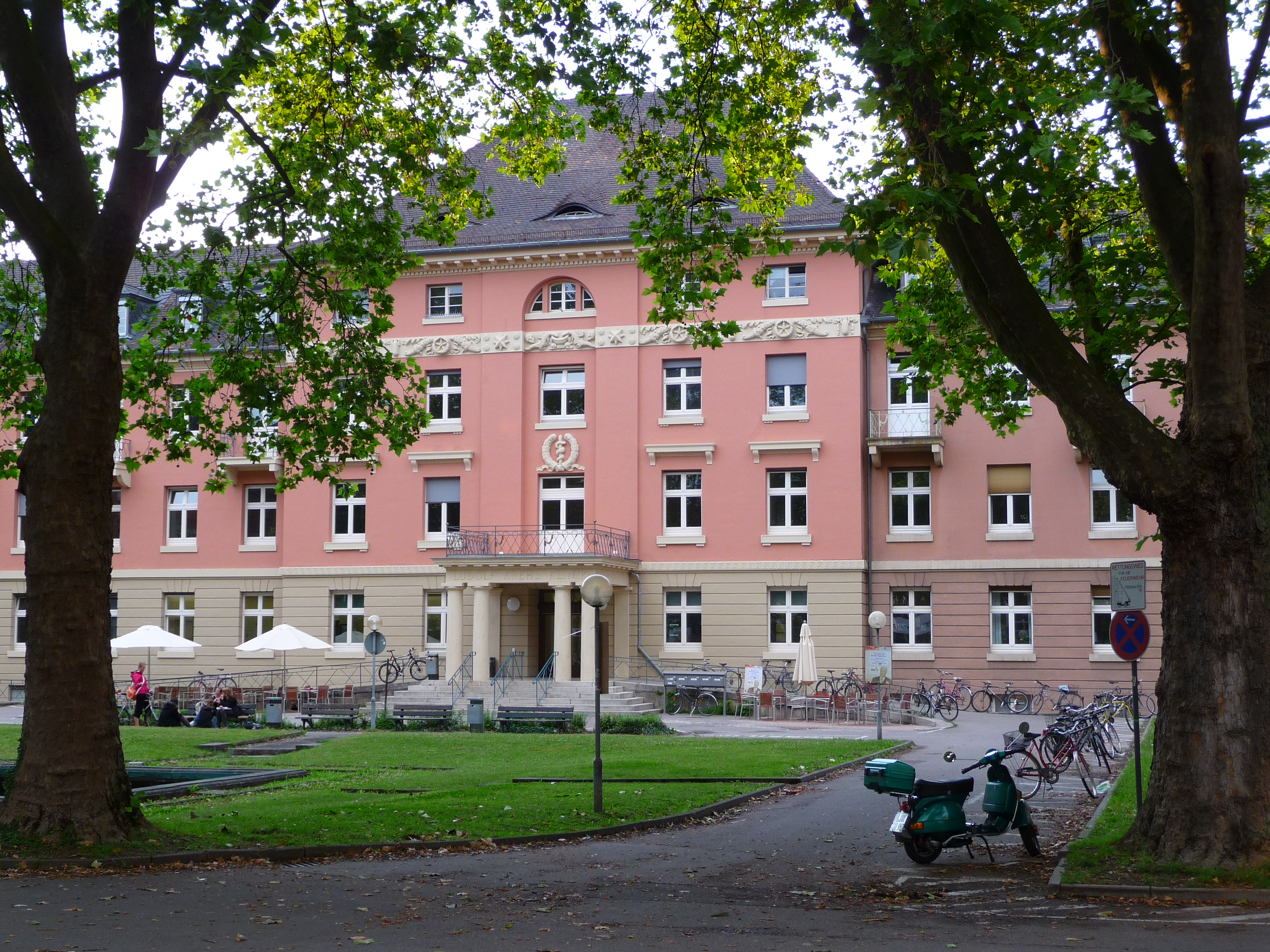
The Bergheim Campus houses Economics and the Social Sciences.

The Bergheim Campus is located in the former Ludolf Krehl clinic (named after Ludolf von Krehl) in the inner-city suburb of Heidelberg-Bergheim. Since March 2009 it has housed the institutes economics, political science, and sociology (together the Heidelberg University Faculty of Economics and Social Sciences) that formerly resided at the Old Town campus. The Bergheim campus offers one lecture theatre, several seminar rooms, the most modern of the university libraries, and a cafe (rather than the full cafeteria present in the other campuses). Since 2019, the Bergheim Campus has also become the location of the Centre for Asian and Transcultural Studies of the Heidelberg University.

=== Libraries ===
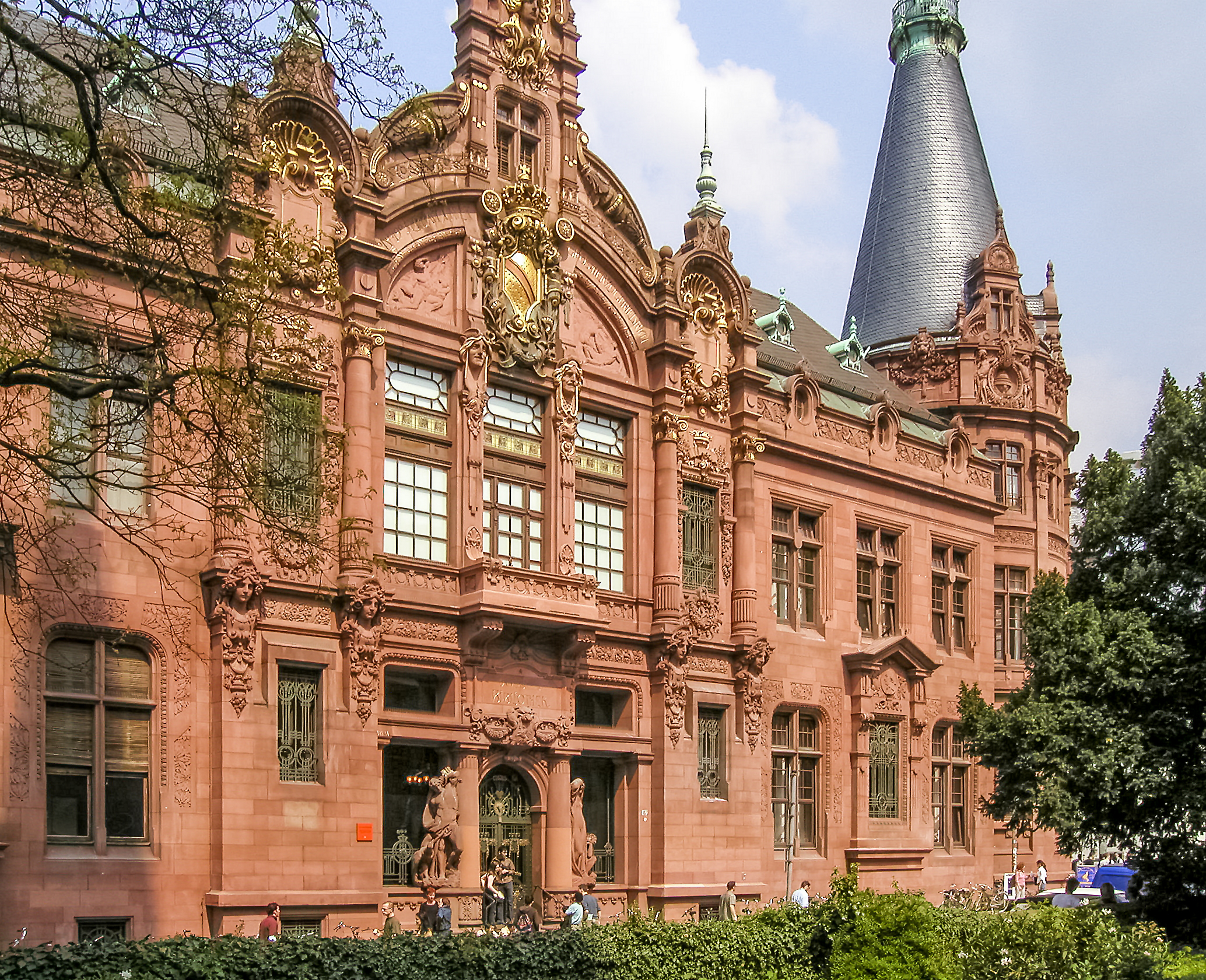
The main building of the University Library, built in 1905

The University Library is the main library of the university. Together with the branch libraries, serving the faculties and institutes, it forms the integral university library system comprising approximately 6.2 million printed volumes. The University Library's holdings exceeded one million in 1934. Today, it comprises about 3.2 million books, about 500,000 other media such as microfilms and video tapes, as well as 6,000 printed scientific periodicals. Moreover, it has 6,900 manuscripts, 1,800 incunabula, 110,500 autographs, and a collection of old maps, paintings, and photographs. Furthermore, the 38 branch libraries add another 3.0 million printed books. In 2022, 43,600 active users accessed 746,000 books. Additionally, the University Library provides a wide array of online resources, among them 152,000 scientific e-journals.

The origins of today's University Library date back to 1386, the year the university was founded. Surrounding the new university, the libraries of the faculty of the arts, the three higher faculties (theology, law, medicine) and the collegiate library grew. The acquisition of a box of records, which was housed in the Heiliggeistkirche, through the rector, Marsilius of Inghen, in 1388 contributed fundamentally to the development of the library. In the 16th century, Otto Henry, Elector Palatine, combined the miscellaneous book collections accrued since the foundation of the university with the princely library housed in Heidelberg Castle to form the Bibliotheca Palatina and made them publicly accessible in the galleries of the Heiliggeistkirche. Among these collections, inherited records of the Fuggers (Augsburg, Ulrich Fugger the Elder) were of particular importance. The majority of the library holdings, which enjoyed great contemporary renown, was looted during the Thirty Years' War, transported to Rome and was gifted to Pope Gregory XV by the victorious Maximilian I, Elector of Bavaria in 1622. After the secularization in 1804, the holdings of the monasteries of Salem and Petershausen formed the foundation of the reconstruction of the library collection in the 19th century. In 1816, 847 German-language manuscripts from the Bibliotheca Palatina returned to Heidelberg. As part of an exchange, the Codex Manesse, which had ended up in the Royal Library in Paris, followed in 1888. Karl Zangemeister (1837–1902) became the first full-time head of the university library in 1912. Based on the designs of architect Joseph Durum, a dedicated library building, a richly ornamented, four-winged red sandstone construction, was erected from 1901 to 1905. In 1978, a branch library opened in the Neuenheimer Feld, serving the institutes of natural sciences and medicine.

Since 2021, all manuscripts of the Bibliotheca Palatina are accessible digitally online (848 German-language Palatina manuscripts, 2,030 Latin, 423 Greek, 267 Hebrew and 20 manuscripts in other languages). Their digitization was achieved through the cooperation of Heidelberg University Library and the Vatican Library.

The university library expands its publication services: The Heidelberg document server heiDOK is an open access platform for members of the university. The university bibliography heiBIB lists all academic publications by university members. In 2015, Heidelberg University founded the publishing house Heidelberg University Publishing – heiUP, which is part of the university library. The publisher releases quality-controlled scientific publications in open access.

=== Facilities abroad ===
Heidelberg University founded a Center for Latin America in Santiago, Chile in 2001. It has the task of organizing, managing, and marketing the courses of study maintained either independently by Heidelberg University or in cooperation with the Pontifical Catholic University of Chile and the University of Chile. The center has responsibility for programs of postgraduate education. It also coordinates the activities of Heidelberg University in Latin America, and provides a platform for scientific cooperation. Heidelberg University's South Asia Institute maintains branch offices in New Delhi (India), Islamabad (Pakistan), Kathmandu (Nepal), and Colombo (Sri Lanka).

The university is also represented by a liaison office in New York. Its main tasks include promoting existing collaborations, building up new networks, creating joint study programs, and maintaining and expanding academic contacts with American universities.

=== Museum ===
The university has its own museum, in the main building of the old campus. Visitors are able to view the Great Hall (when not in use), and the former "student jail".

== Organization ==
=== Governance ===
The Rectorate is the 'executive body' of the university, headed by rector Prof. Dr. Frauke Melchior. The rectorate consists of the chancellor, Holger Schroeter, who is the head of the central administration and responsible for the university's budgeting, and three pro-rectors, who are responsible for international relations, teaching and communication, and research and structure respectively.

The Senate is the 'legislative branch' of the university. The rector and the members of the rectorate are senators ex officio, as are also the deans of the faculties, as well as the medical and managing directors of the University Hospital, and the university's equal opportunities officer. Another 20 senators are elected for four-year terms, within the following quotas: eight university professors; four academic staff; four delegates of the student body; and four employees of the university administration.

The university council is the advisory board to the aforementioned entities and encompasses, among others, the former Israeli Ambassador to Germany Avi Primor, as well as CEOs of German industries.

=== Faculties ===
After a 2003 structural reformation, the university consists of 13 faculties, which in turn comprise several disciplines, departments, and institutes. As a consequence of the Bologna process, most faculties now offer Bachelor's, Master's, and Ph.D. degrees to comply with the new European degree standard. Notable exceptions are the undergraduate programs in law, medicine, dentistry and pharmacy, from which students still graduate with the State Examination, a central examination at Master's level held by the State of Baden-Württemberg.

- The Faculty of Behavioural Sciences and Empirical Cultural Sciences
- The Faculty of Biosciences
- The Faculty of Chemistry and Earth Sciences
- The Faculty of Engineering
- The Faculty of Law
- The Faculty of Mathematics and Computer Science
- The Faculty of Medicine
- The Faculty of Medicine in Mannheim
- The Faculty of Modern Languages
- The Faculty of Philosophy and History
- The Faculty of Physics and Astronomy
- The Faculty of Theology
- The Faculty of Economics and Social Sciences

=== Associated institutions ===
- Network for Research on Ageing
- Central Institute of Mental Health Mannheim
- Heidelberg Center for American Studies
- Heidelberg Institute for International Conflict Research,
- Heidelberg State Observatory,
- University Hospital Heidelberg,
- University Hospital Mannheim

=== Partnerships ===
The university has partnerships nationally and internationally. In particular, it maintains longstanding collaborations in research and education with the following independent research institutes located in and around Heidelberg:

- Center for Jewish Studies Heidelberg
- European Molecular Biology Laboratory
- German Cancer Research Center (Helmholtz Association)
- Heavy Ion Research Center Darmstadt (Helmholtz Association),
- Heidelberg University of Education
- Heidelberg Academy of Sciences
- Karlsruhe Research Center (Helmholtz Association)
- Max Planck Institute for Astronomy (Max Planck Society)
- Max Planck Institute for Comparative Public Law and International Law (Max Planck Society)
- Max Planck Institute for Medical Research (Max Planck Society)
- Max Planck Institute for Nuclear Physics (Max Planck Society)

== Academic profile ==
=== School statistics ===
The university employs more than 15,000 academic staff; most of them are physicians engaged in the University Hospital. As of 2008, the faculty encompasses 4,196 full-time staff, excluding visiting professors as well as graduate research and teaching assistants. 673 faculty members have been drawn from abroad. Heidelberg University also attracts more than 500 international scholars as visiting professors each academic year. The university enrols a total of 28,949 students, including 5,276 international students. In addition there are 1,467 international exchange students at Heidelberg. 23,636 students pursue taught degrees, 4,114 of whom are international students, and 919 are international exchange students. 4,114 students pursue a doctoral degree, including 1,444 international doctoral students and 15 international exchange students. In 2007, the university awarded 994 PhD degrees.

=== Rankings ===
University rankings

Overall – Global & National
QS World 2026	▲80	3
THE World 2027	▲45	3
ARWU World 2025	▼51	3

By subject – Global & National
QS Natural Sciences 2024	50	4
THE Physical Sciences 2026	40	3
QS Life Sciences and Medicine 2024	38	1
THE Life Sciences 2026	39	1
ARWU Clinical Medicine 2023	17	1

In the 2026 QS World University Rankings, Heidelberg ranked 80th globally and third in Germany. According to the 2027 edition of Times Higher Education World University Rankings, the university was ranked 45th in the world and held the position as the third best university in the country. In the 2025 ARWU World Rankings, Heidelberg secured the 51st position worldwide and was ranked third nationally.

According to the funding report of the German Research Foundation (DFG) of 2018, which breaks down the grants from 2014 to 2016, the Heidelberg University ranked 2nd among German universities in the overall ranking, 7th in humanities and social sciences and 4th among German universities in the life sciences and natural sciences. The approvals were normalised to the size of the university. In a competitive selection process, the DFG selects the best research projects from researchers at universities and research institutes and finances them. The ranking is thus regarded as an indicator of the quality of research.

In the Performance Ranking of Scientific Papers for World Universities (NTU ranking) 2019, which measures the research outputs of universities, Heidelberg University is ranked 1st in Germany and 5th in Continental Europe.

In the CWTS Leiden Ranking 2019 Heidelberg University is ranked 1st in Germany and 13th in Continental Europe over all sciences according to the scientific impact (number of publications in core journals). According to the indicator "Collaboration", Heidelberg University is 1st in Germany and 10th in Europe.

Ranked by the number of Nobel Laureates affiliated with the university at the time of Nobel Prize announcement, Heidelberg was placed 1st in Germany, 4th in Europe and 13th in the world by 2013.

According to the Third European Report on Science & Technology Indicators compiled by the European Commission, Heidelberg ranked 4th nationally and 9th in Europe.

The German Center for Higher Education Development Excellence Ranking 2010, which measures academic performance of European graduate programs in biology, chemistry, economics, mathematics, physics, political sciences, and psychology, placed Heidelberg in the European excellence group for biology, chemistry, mathematics, physics, and psychology.

Measured by the number of top managers in the German economy, Heidelberg University ranked 53rd in 2019.

QS World University Rankings by Subject 2024
Subject	Global	National
Arts & Humanities	▼ =72	4
Linguistics	▲101–150	▲6–11
Theology, Divinity and Religious Studies	▲13	2
Archaeology	▲21	4
Classics and Ancient History	▲4	▲1
English Language and Literature	▲73	4
History	▲ =40	4
Modern Languages	▲ =63	4
Philosophy	51–100	▼6–9
Engineering and Technology	N/A	N/A
Computer Science and Information Systems	▼ =155	7
Life Sciences & Medicine	▲ =38	1
Biological Sciences	▼27	2
Medicine	▲ =31	1
Nursing	151–200	1
Pharmacy and Pharmacology	▼ =46	1
Psychology	101–150	4–7
Natural Sciences	▼50	▼4
Chemistry	▼ =68	▼6
Earth and Marine Sciences	▼101–150	▼8–13
Environmental Sciences	251–300	15–18
Geography	▼101–150	3–6
Geology	▼101–150	▼7–13
Geophysics	51–100	1–7
Materials Sciences	201–250	10–11
Mathematics	▼ =143	▼8
Physics and Astronomy	▲31	▲2
Social Sciences & Management	▼ =210	7–8
Accounting and Finance	251–300	▼10
Anthropology	51–100	▲2–5
Economics and Econometrics	151–200	▼6–9
Education and Training	▲151–200	▲5–8
Law and Legal Studies	▲ =62	3
Politics	101–150	5–6
Sociology	101–150	5–8

THE World University Rankings by Subject 2024
Subject	Global	National
Arts & humanities	▼37	5
Clinical & health	▲35	2
Life sciences	▼32	1
Physical sciences	▼42	▼4
Psychology	▲73	▲4

ARWU Global Ranking of Academic Subjects 2023
Subject	Global	National
Natural Sciences
Mathematics	201–300	▼14–20
Physics	▼45	2
Chemistry	▼201–300	▼13–21
Earth Sciences	101–150	5–10
Geography	151–200	▲5–9
Atmospheric Science	▼201–300	▼13–22
Engineering
Biomedical Engineering	151–200	▲6–10
Computer Science & Engineering	201–300	▼4–7
Materials Science & Engineering	▼301–400	▼14–18
Nanoscience & Nanotechnology	201–300	8–12
Biotechnology	▼101–150	2–7
Life Sciences
Biological Sciences	▲43	▲1
Human Biological Sciences	▲46	▲4
Medical Sciences
Clinical Medicine	▼18	1
Public Health	▼51–75	▼3
Dentistry & Oral Sciences	76–100	▲3–7
Medical Technology	▲11	2
Pharmacy & Pharmaceutical Sciences	▼35	2
Social Sciences
Economics	201–300	9–13
Statistics	101–150	▲2–6
Political Sciences	▼201–300	▼12–18
Sociology	151–200	▼9–11
Education	▼301–400	▲6–18
Psychology	▲76–100	5–6
Public Administration	▼151–200	▼7–11

=== Organisation and length of courses ===
The academic year is divided into two semesters. The winter semester runs from 1 October to 31 March and the summer semester from 1 April to 30 September. Classes are held from mid-October to mid-February and mid-April to mid-July. Students can generally begin their studies either in the winter or the summer semester. However, there are several subjects students can begin only in the winter semester. The standard time required to finish a Bachelor's degree is principally six semesters, and a further four semesters for consecutive Master's degrees. The normal duration of PhD programmes for full-time students is 6 semesters. The overall period of study for an undergraduate degree is divided into two parts: a period of basic study, lasting at least four semesters, at the end of which students must sit a formal examination, and a period of advanced study, lasting at least two semesters, after which students take their final examinations.

=== Admission ===
In the winter-semester 2006/2007, the university offered 3,926 places in undergraduate programs restricted by numerus clausus, with an overall acceptance rate of 16.3%. Most selective are the undergraduate programs in clinical medicine, molecular biotechnology, political science, and law, with acceptance rates of 3.6%, 3.8%, 7.6% and 9.1% respectively. The selection is exercised by allocating the best qualified applicants to a given number of places available in the respective discipline, thus depending primarily on the chosen subjects and the grade point average of the Abitur or its equivalent. For some majors and minors in humanities—particularly for conceptually non-vocational like classics and ancient history—unrestricted admission is granted under certain criteria (e.g., relevant language proficiency), as applications regularly do not exceed the number of places available.

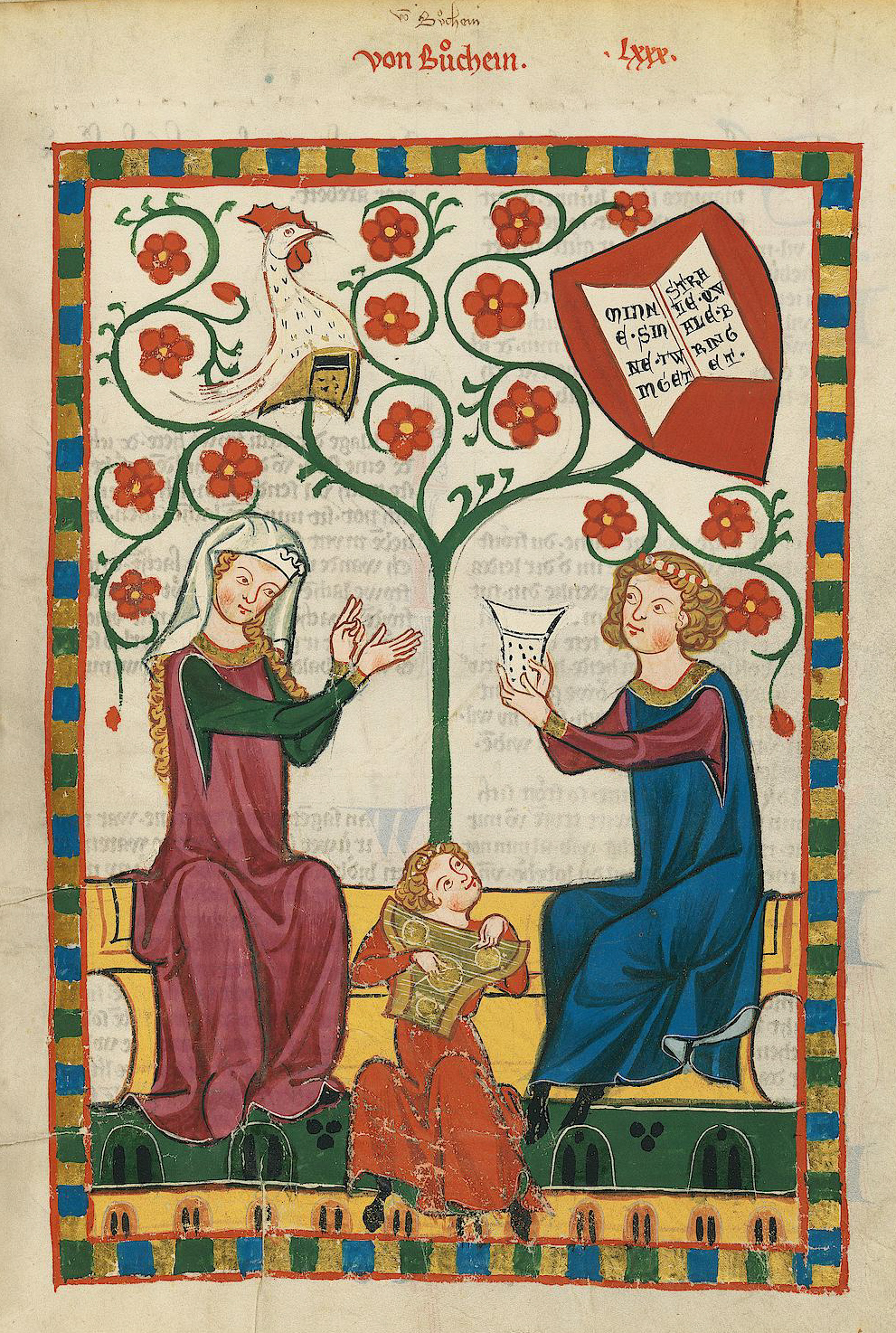
The University Library's collection includes the Codex Manesse, an important German song manuscript of the Middle Ages.

For prospective international undergraduate students, a language test for German—such as the DSH—is required. Admission to consecutive Master's programs always requires at least an undergraduate degree equivalent to the German grade "good" (i.e., normally B+ in American, or 2:1 in British terms). Except for the Master's programs taught in English, a language test for German must be passed as well. PhD admission prerequisite is normally a strong Master's-level degree, but specific admission procedures vary and cannot be generalized. International applicants usually make up considerably more than 20% of the applicant pool and are considered individually by the merits achieved in their respective country of origin.

=== Finances ===
The German state heavily subsidizes university study to keep higher education affordable regardless of socio-economic background. From 2007 to 2012, Heidelberg has charged tuition fees of approximately €1,200 p.a. for undergraduate, consecutive Master's, and doctoral programs, for both EU and non-EU citizens, and for any subject area. However, from spring term 2012 onwards, tuition fees have been abolished. The usual housing costs for on-campus dormitories range from €2,200 to €3,000 p.a.

In the fiscal year 2005, Heidelberg University had an overall operating budget of approximately €856 M, consisting of approximately €413 M government funds, approximately €311 M basic budget, and approximately €132 M from external grants. The university spent approximately €529 M in payroll costs and approximately €326 M in other expenditures. Additionally, the university receives another €150 M in research grants, distributed over 5 years from 2012 onwards, due to the German Universities Excellence Initiative. In the fiscal year 2007, the university for the first time raised approximately €19 M through tuition fees, exclusively to further improve the conditions of study. Only approximately €9.5 M of these were spent at the end of the year and the rectorate had to urge the faculties to make use of their additional means.

=== Research ===
Among historical scientific achievements of Heidelberg researchers features prominently the invention of spectroscopy, and of the Bunsen burner; the discovery of chemical elements Caesium and Rubidium; the identification of the absolute point of ebullition; and the identification and isolation of nicotine as the main pharmacologically active component of tobacco. Modern scientific psychiatry; psychopharmacology; psychiatric genetics; environmental physics; and modern sociology were introduced as scientific disciplines by Heidelberg faculty. Almost 800 dwarf planets, the North America Nebula, and the return of Halley's Comet have been discovered and documented at institutes of the Heidelberg Center for Astronomy. Moreover, Heidelberg researchers invented the process of plastination to preserve body tissue, conducted the first successful transplantation of hematopoietic stem cells, and recently developed a new strategy for a vaccination against certain forms of cancer, which earned Harald zur Hausen of the university the Nobel Prize in Physiology or Medicine 2008.

Today, the university puts an emphasis on natural sciences and medicine, but it retains its traditions with highly ranked faculties of humanities and social sciences. The Marsilius Kolleg, named after Marsilius of Inghen, was established in 2007 as a Center for Advanced Study to promote interdisciplinary dialogue and research especially between the sciences and the humanities. Other institutes such as the Interdisciplinary Center for Scientific Computing, the Interdisciplinary Center for Neurosciences, the Heidelberg Center for American Studies, and the South Asia Institute also build a bridge between faculties and thus emphasize the concept of a comprehensive university.

Noted regular publications of the Center for Astronomy include the Gliese catalogue of nearby stars, the fundamental catalogues FK5 and FK6 and the annual published Apparent places, a high precision catalog with pre-calculated positions for over 3,000 stars for each day. The Heidelberg Institute for International Conflict Research publishes the annual Conflict Barometer, which describes the recent trends in global conflict developments, escalations, de-escalations, and settlements. Regular publications by the Max Planck Institute for International Law include the Heidelberg Journal of International Law, the Max Planck Yearbook of United Nations Law; the Journal of the History of International Law; the Max Planck Encyclopedia of Public International Law; and the semi-annual bibliography Public International Law.

The German Research Foundation (DFG) currently funds twelve long-term Collaborative Research Centers (SFB) with a duration of up to 12 years at Heidelberg, four Priority Programs (SPP) with a duration of six years, two Research Units (FOR) with a duration of up to six years, as well as numerous individual projects at the university's faculties and institutes. As a result of the German Universities Excellence Initiative, two Clusters of Excellence are funded with €6.5 M each—"Cellular Networks: From Molecular Mechanisms to Quantitative Understanding of Complex Functions", and "Asia and Europe in a Global Context".

=== International cooperations ===
Heidelberg is a founding member of the League of European Research Universities, the Coimbra Group, and the European University Association. The university forms part of the German-Japanese University Consortium HeKKSaGOn, and it participates in 7 European exchange schemes for researchers and students, such as ERASMUS. Furthermore, it is actively involved in the development of the German-speaking Andrássy University of Budapest, and co-runs the school of German law at the Jagiellonian University of Kraków. The city of Heidelberg being twinned with Cambridge, England, and Montpellier, France, there are close academic ties to the University of Cambridge and the Université de Montpellier. Beyond Europe, the university and its faculties maintain specific agreements with 58 partner universities in Africa, the Americas, Asia, Australia and the Russian Federation. In total, the Higher Education Compass of the German Rector's Conference lists staff and student exchange agreements as well as research cooperations with 236 universities worldwide. Some of the most notable partner universities include Cornell University, Duke University, Georgetown University, Harvard University, Paris Institute of Political Studies (Sciences Po), Pantheon Sorbonne University, University of Cambridge, University of Oxford, Tsinghua University, and Yale University.

== Student life ==
=== Sports ===
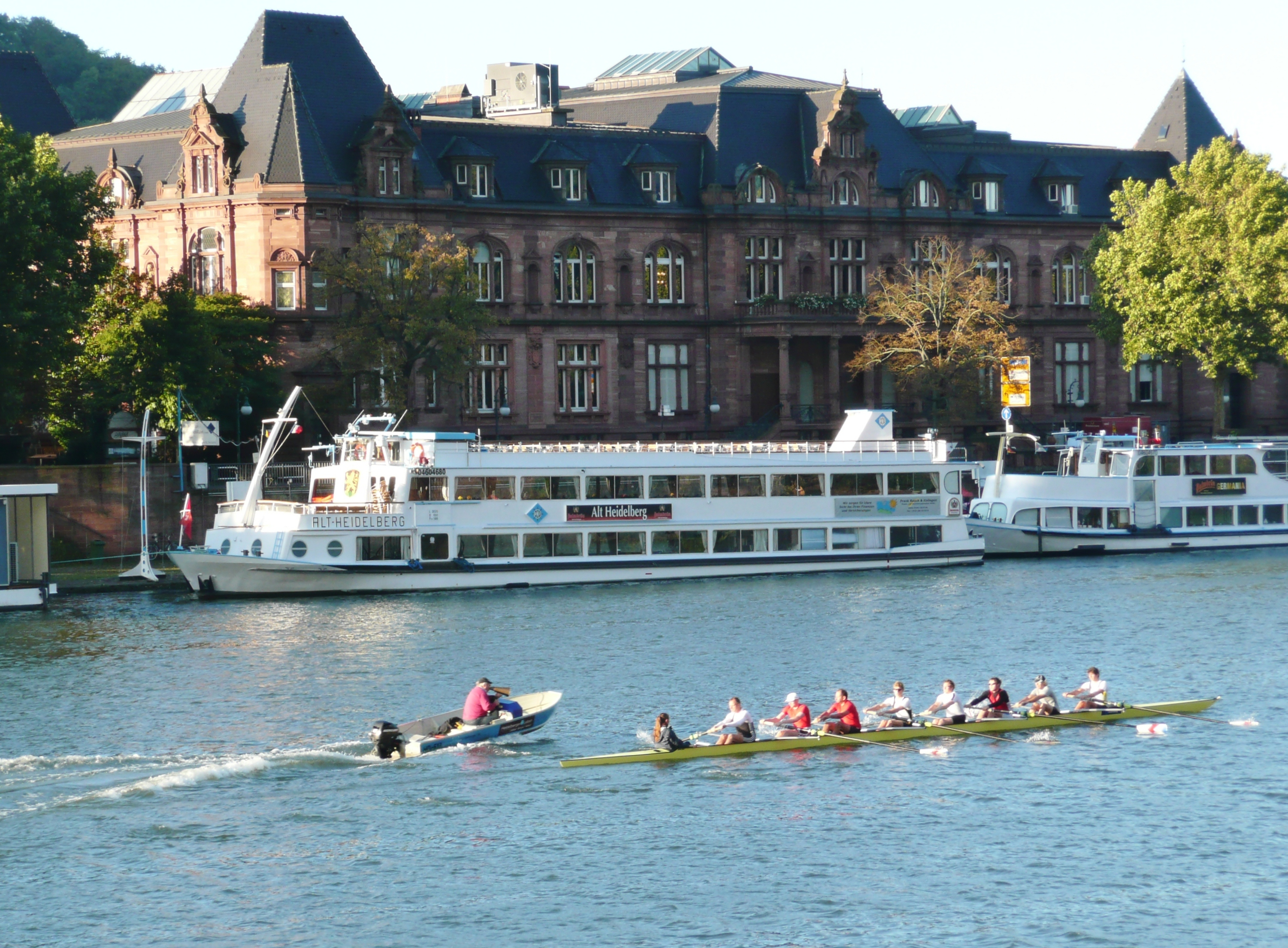
Students rowing on the Neckar river

The university offers a broad variety of athletics, such as teams in 16 different court sports from American football to volleyball, courses in 11 different martial arts, 26 courses in physical fitness and body building, 9 courses in health sports from aquapower to yoga, and groups in 12 different dance styles. Moreover, equestrian sports, sailing, rowing, skiing in the French Alps, track and field, swimming, fencing, cycling, acrobatics, gymnastics, and much more. Most of the sports are free of charge. Heidelberg's competition teams are particularly successful in soccer, volleyball, equestrian sports, judo, karate, track and field, and basketball. The University Sports Club men's basketball team, USC Heidelberg, is the championship record holder, won 13 national championships, and is the only university team playing at a professional level in the second division of Germany's national league.

=== Groups ===
Moreover, the university supports a number of student groups in various fields of interest. Among them are four drama clubs, the university orchestra Collegium Musicum, four choirs, six student media groups, six groups of international students, nine groups of political parties and NGO's, several departments of European organizations of students in certain disciplines, four clubs dedicated to fostering international relations and cultural exchange, a chess club, a literature club, two debate societies (one focused on English debating, the other focused on German debating), one student consulting group, and four religious student groups. Student unions structure themselves as "Studierendenrat" (Student body council) as well as on department level.

=== Media ===
Heidelberg's student newspaper "ruprecht" is—with editions of more than 10,000 copies—one of Germany's largest student-run newspapers. It was recently distinguished by the MLP Pro Campus Press Award as Germany's best student newspaper. The jury of journalists from major newspapers commended its "well balanced, though critical attitude" and its "simply great" layout that "suffices highest professional demands." The ruprecht is financed entirely by advertising revenues, thus retaining independence from university management. Some renowned journalists emerged from ruprecht's editorial board.

However, the critical online student newspaper UNiMUT, which is run by the joint student council of the faculties, criticized the ruprecht often for being conformed, and exceedingly layout-oriented.

Heidelberg is also home of Germany's oldest student law review Heidelberg Law Review. The journal is published quarterly, at the beginning and end of each semester break, and is circulated throughout all of Germany.

=== Studentenverbindung ===
Heidelberg hosts 34 student corporations, which were largely founded in the 19th century. Corporations are to some extent comparable to the fraternities in the US. As traditional symbols (couleur) corporation members wear colored caps and ribbons at ceremonial occasions (Kommers) and some still practice the traditional academic fencing, a kind of duel, to "shape their members for the challenges of life." In the 19th and early 20th century, corporations played an important role in Germany's student life. Today, however, corporations include only a relatively small number of students. Their self-declared mission is to keep academic traditions alive and to create friendships for life. The corporations' often representative 19th-century mansions are present throughout the Old Town.

=== Nightlife ===
Heidelberg is famous for its student night life. Besides the various parties regularly organized by the student councils of the faculties, the semester opening and closing parties of the university, the dormitory parties, and the soirées of Heidelberg's 34 student fraternities, the city offers night life for any taste and budget.

== Notable alumni ==
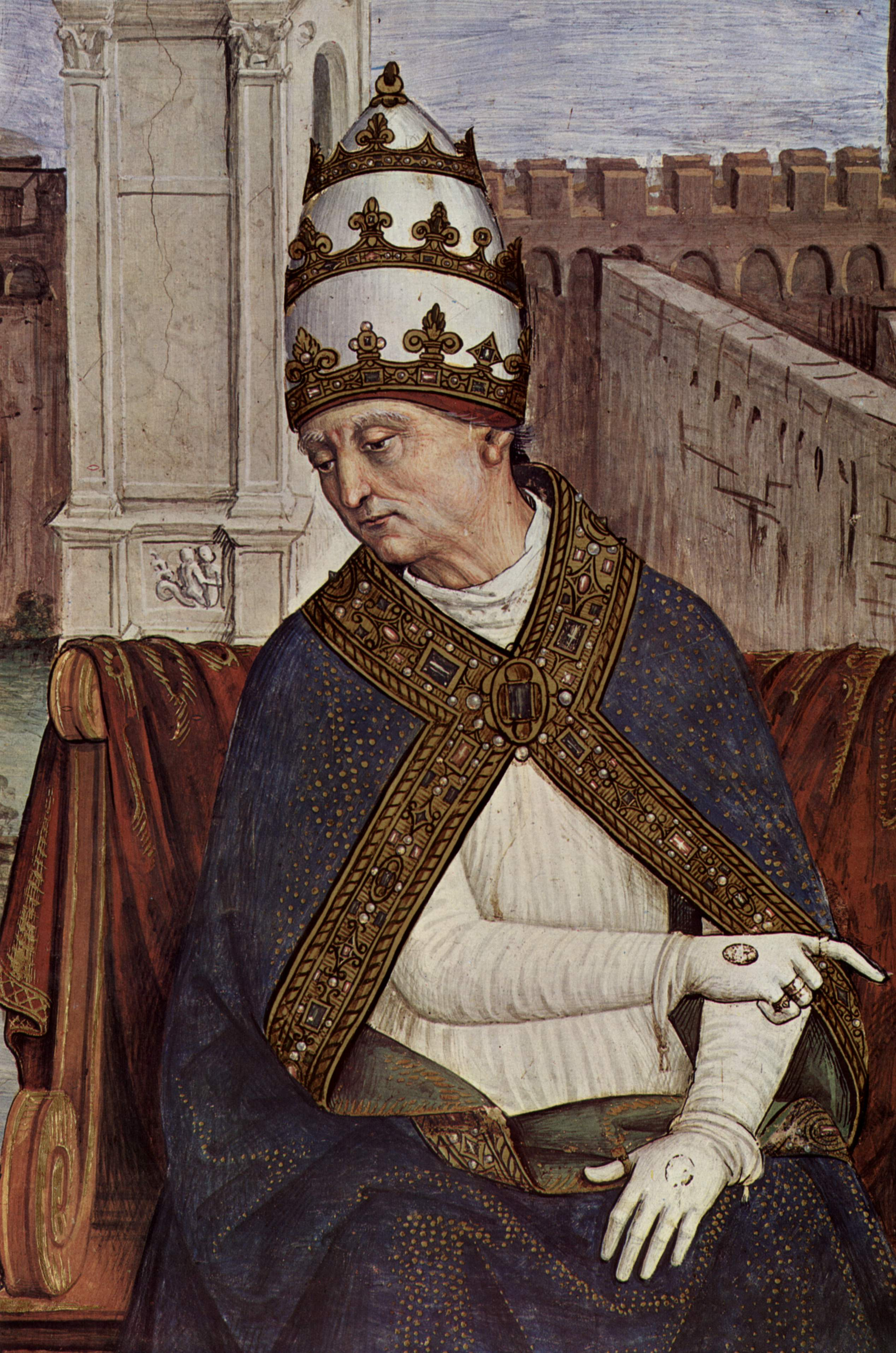
Pope Pius II

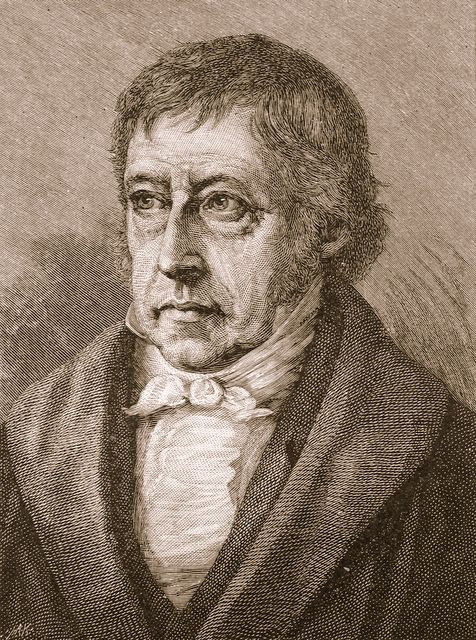
Georg Wilhelm Friedrich Hegel

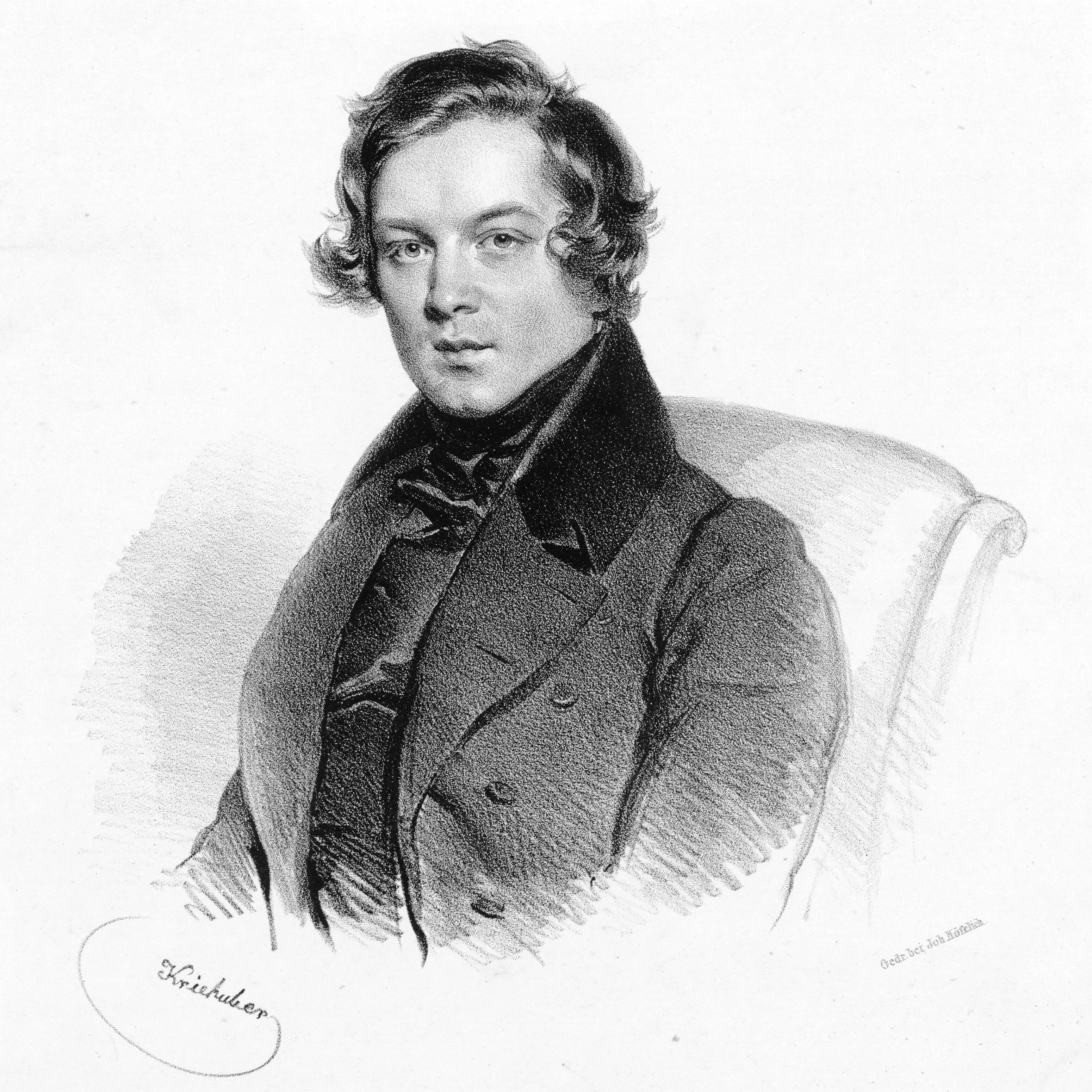
Robert Schumann

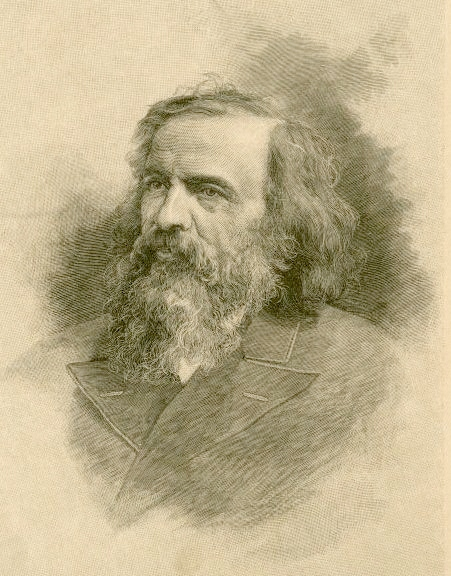
Dmitri Mendeleev

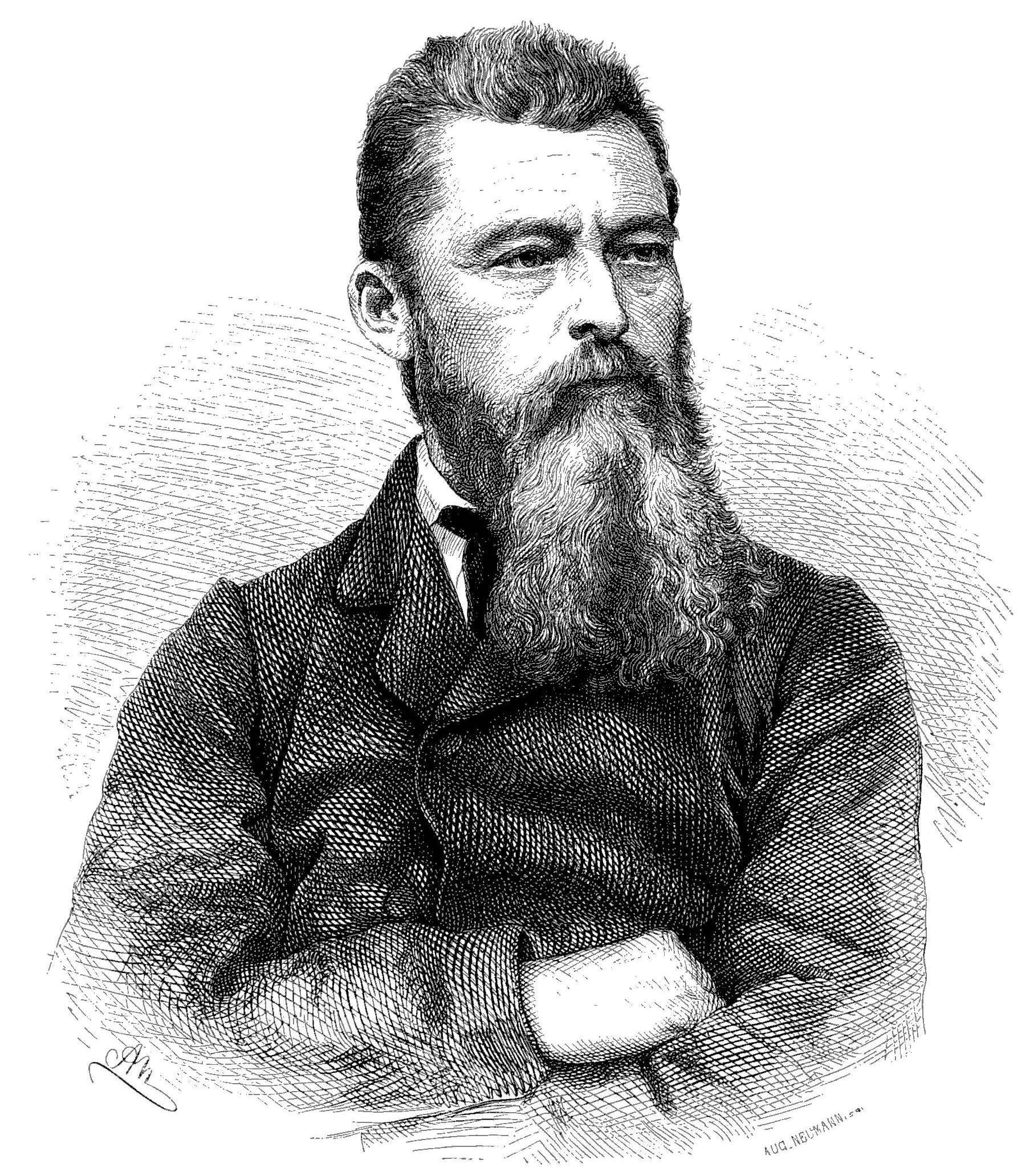
Ludwig Feuerbach

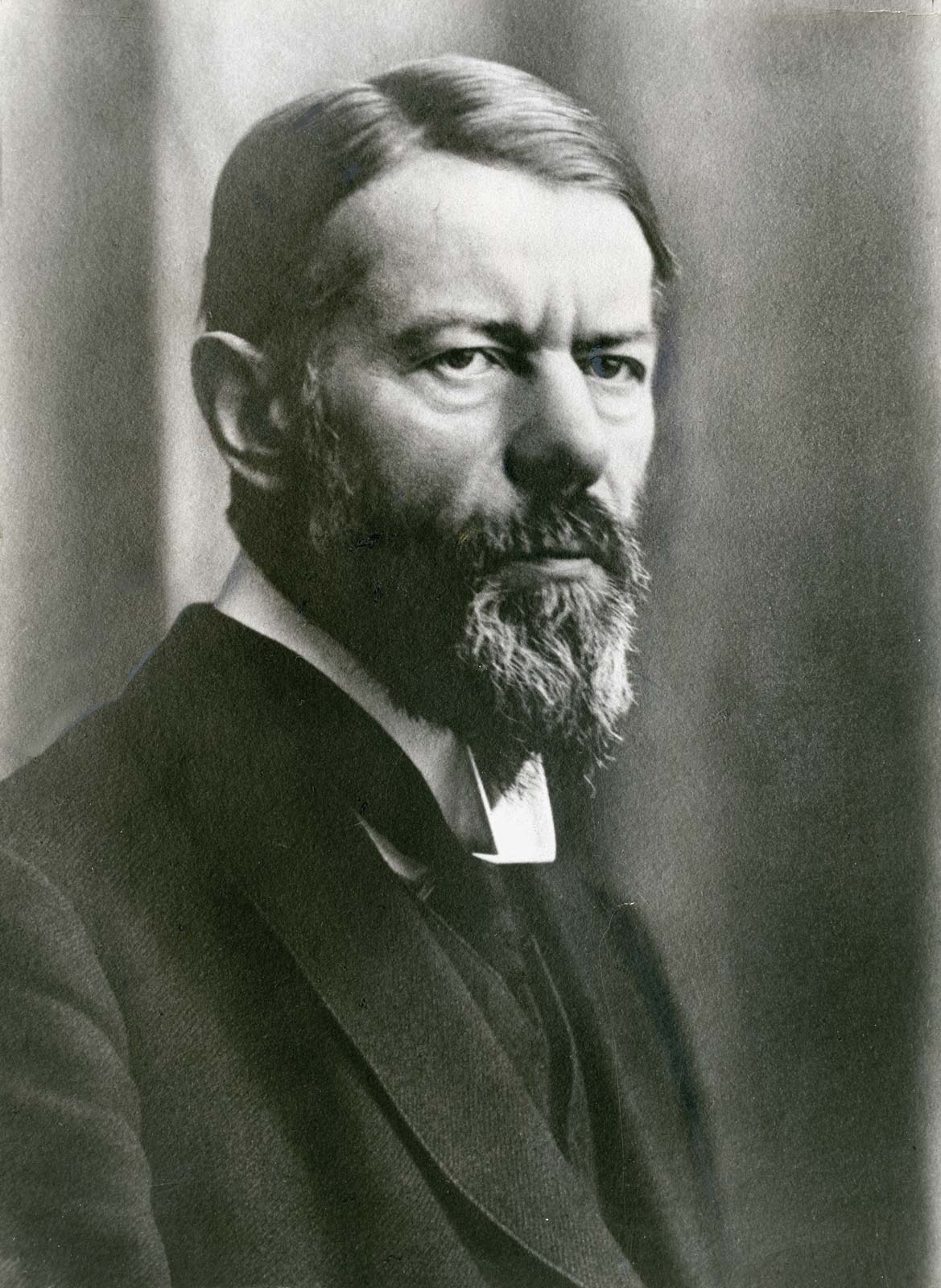
Max Weber

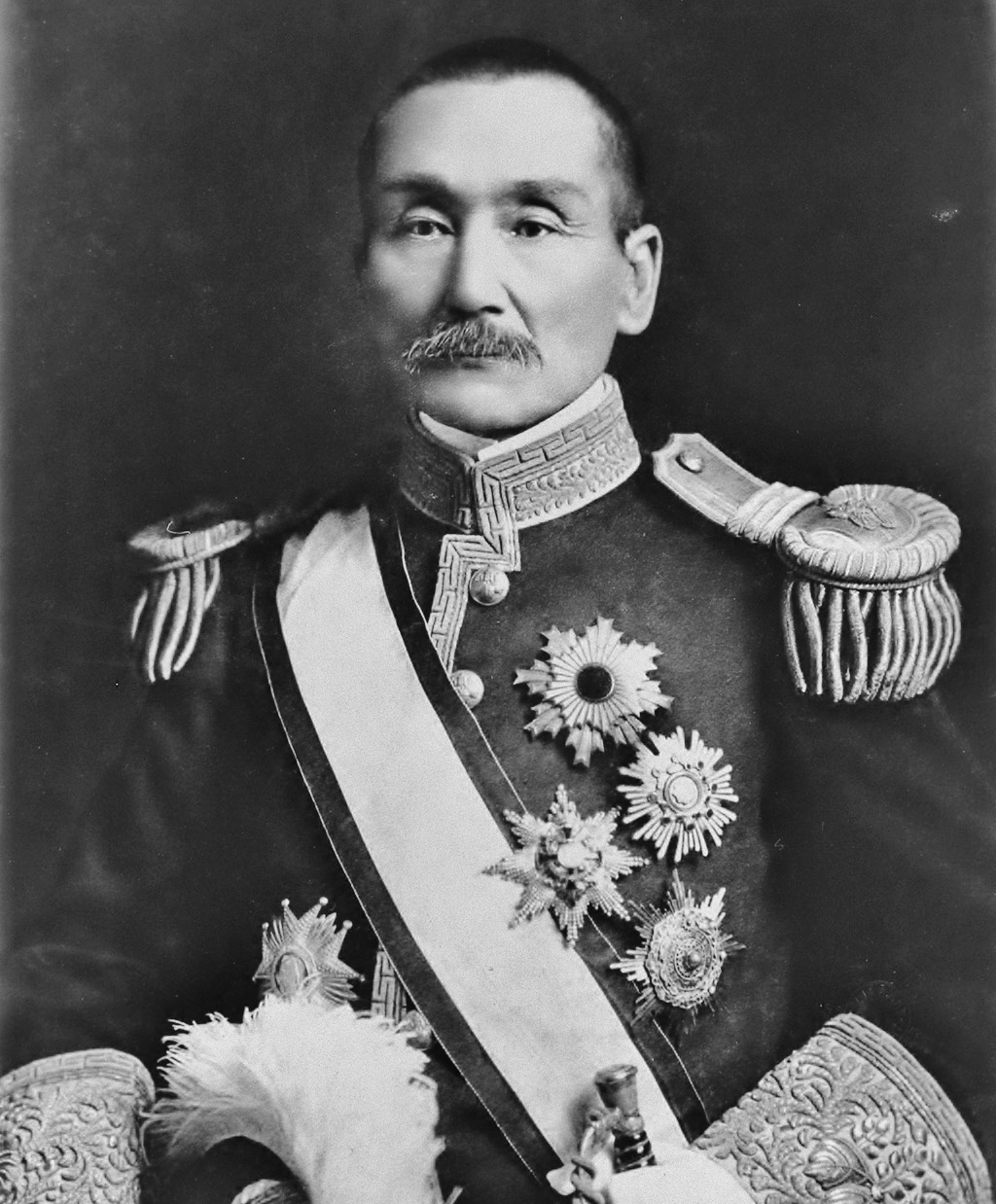
Hirata Tosuke

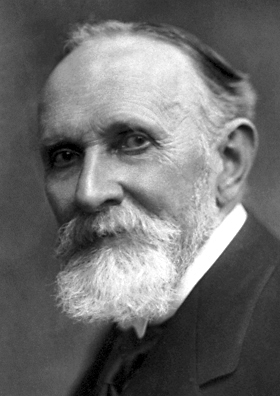
Carl Spitteler

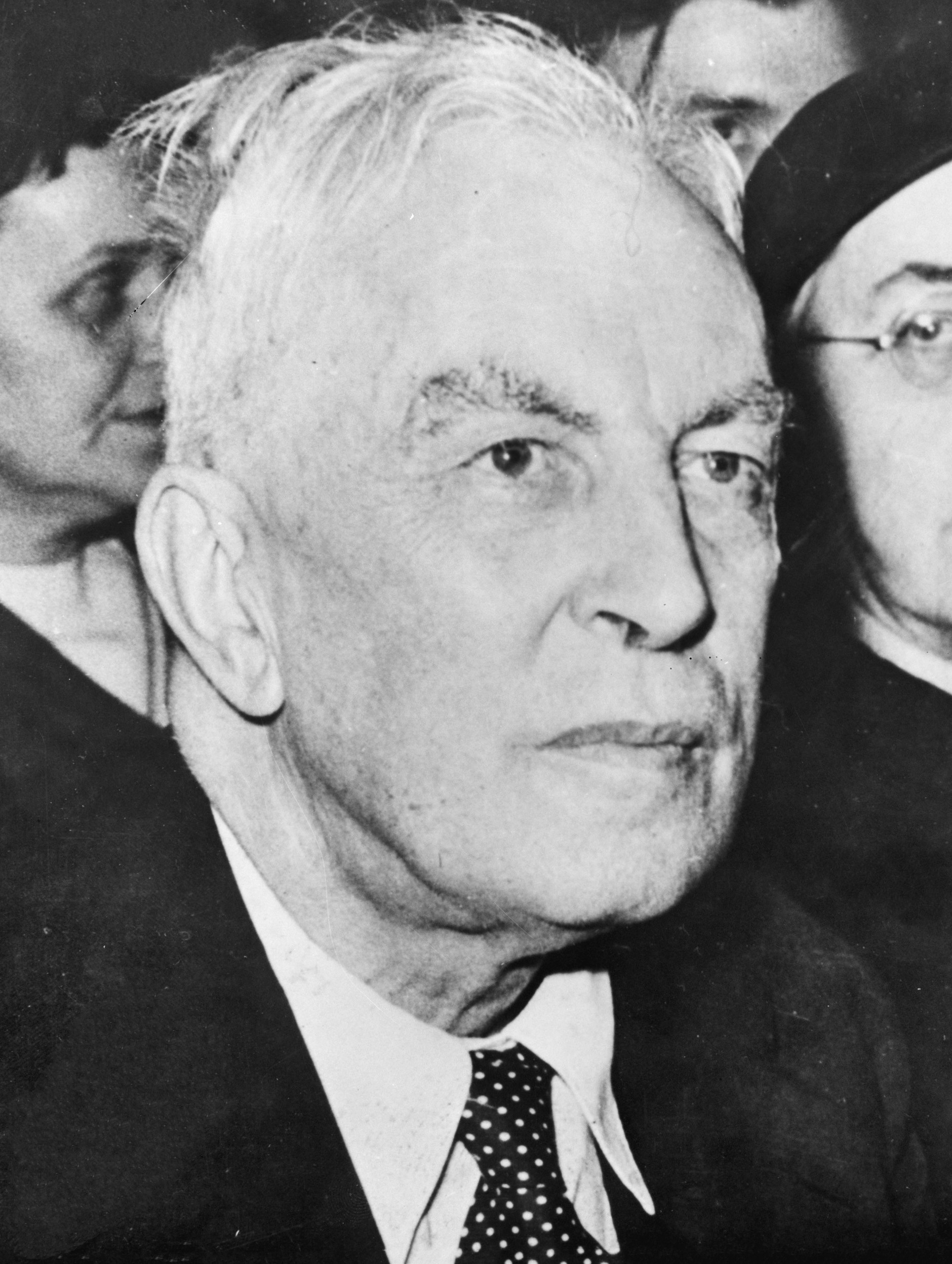
Arnold J. Toynbee

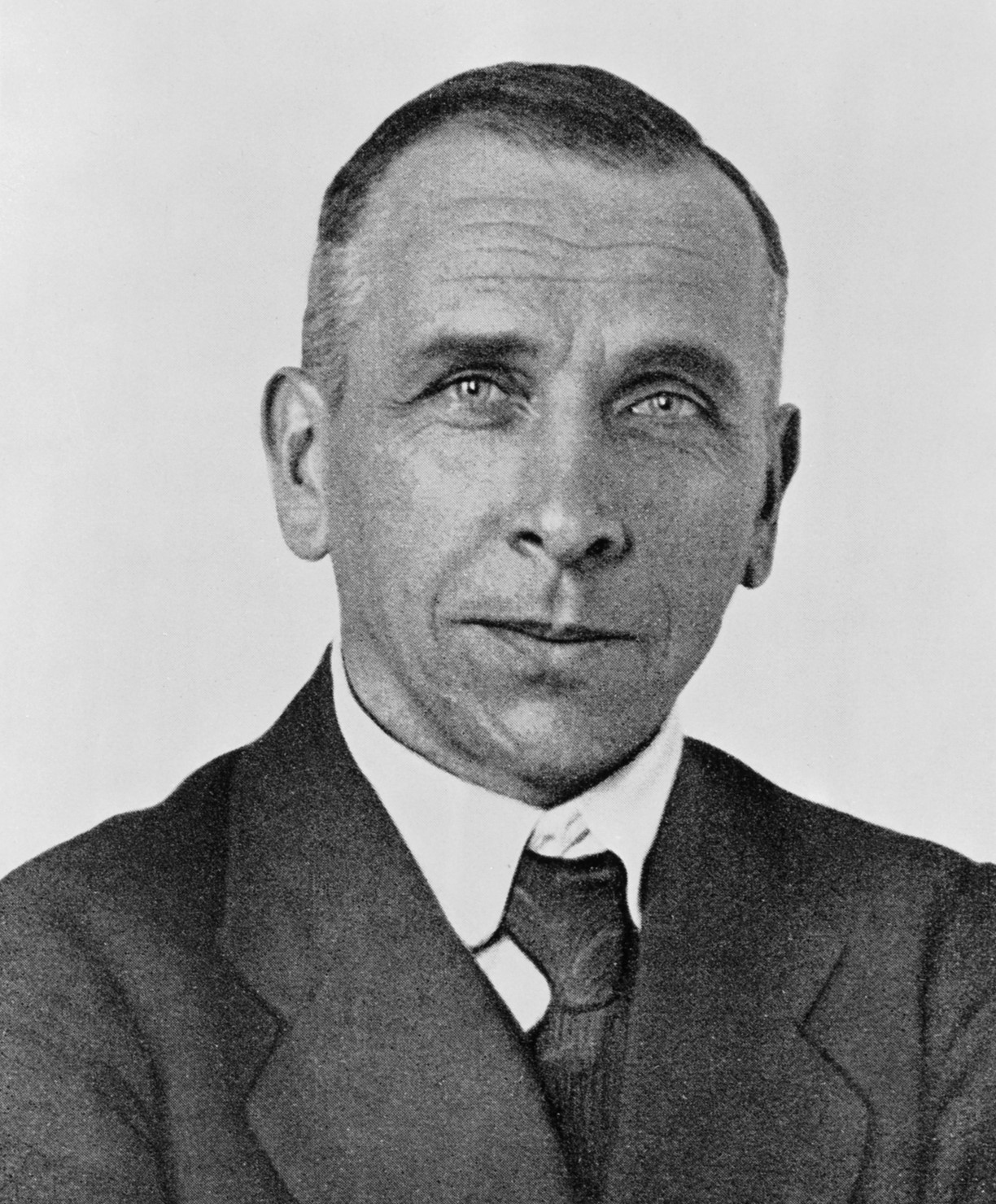
Alfred Wegener

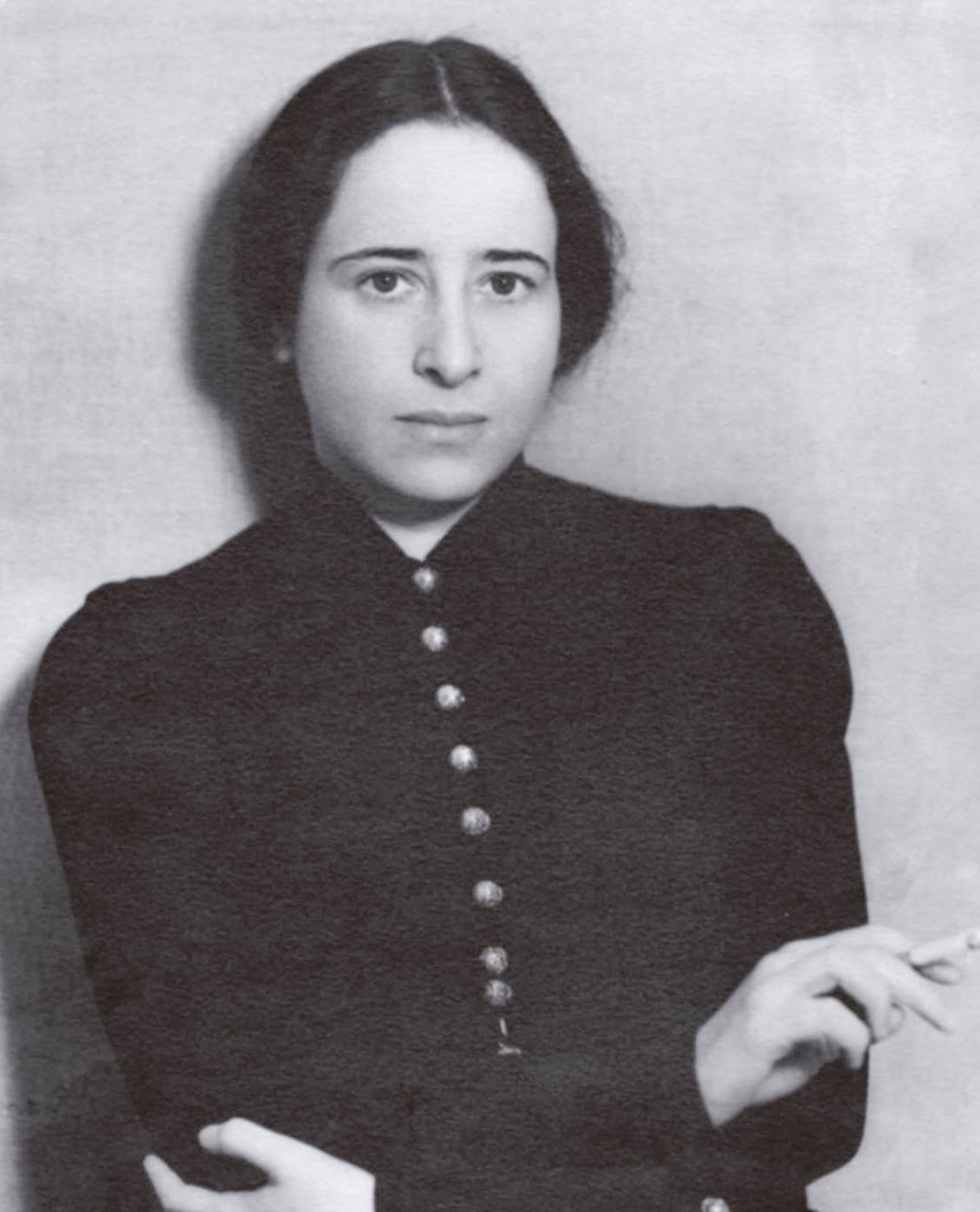
Hannah Arendt

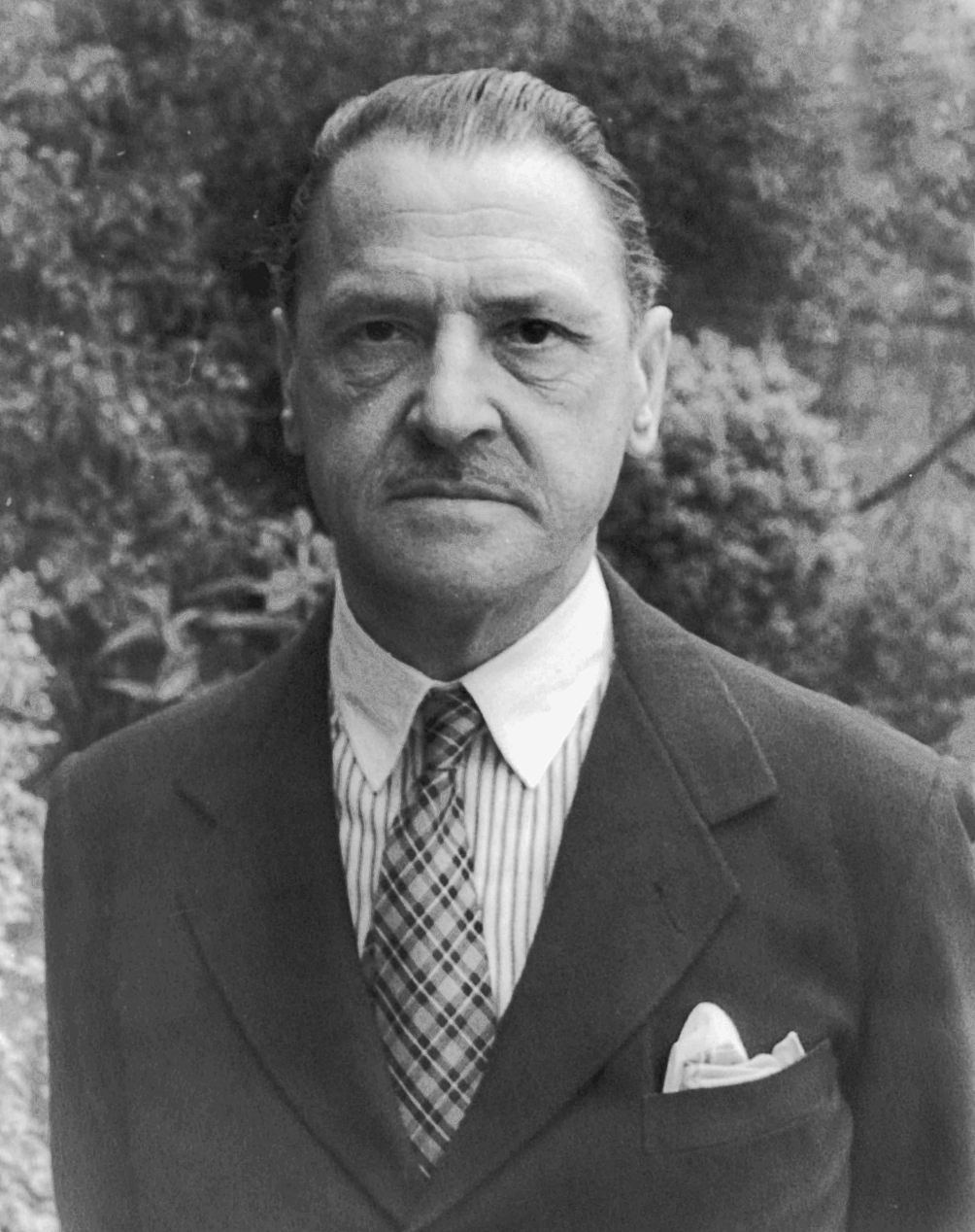
W. Somerset Maugham

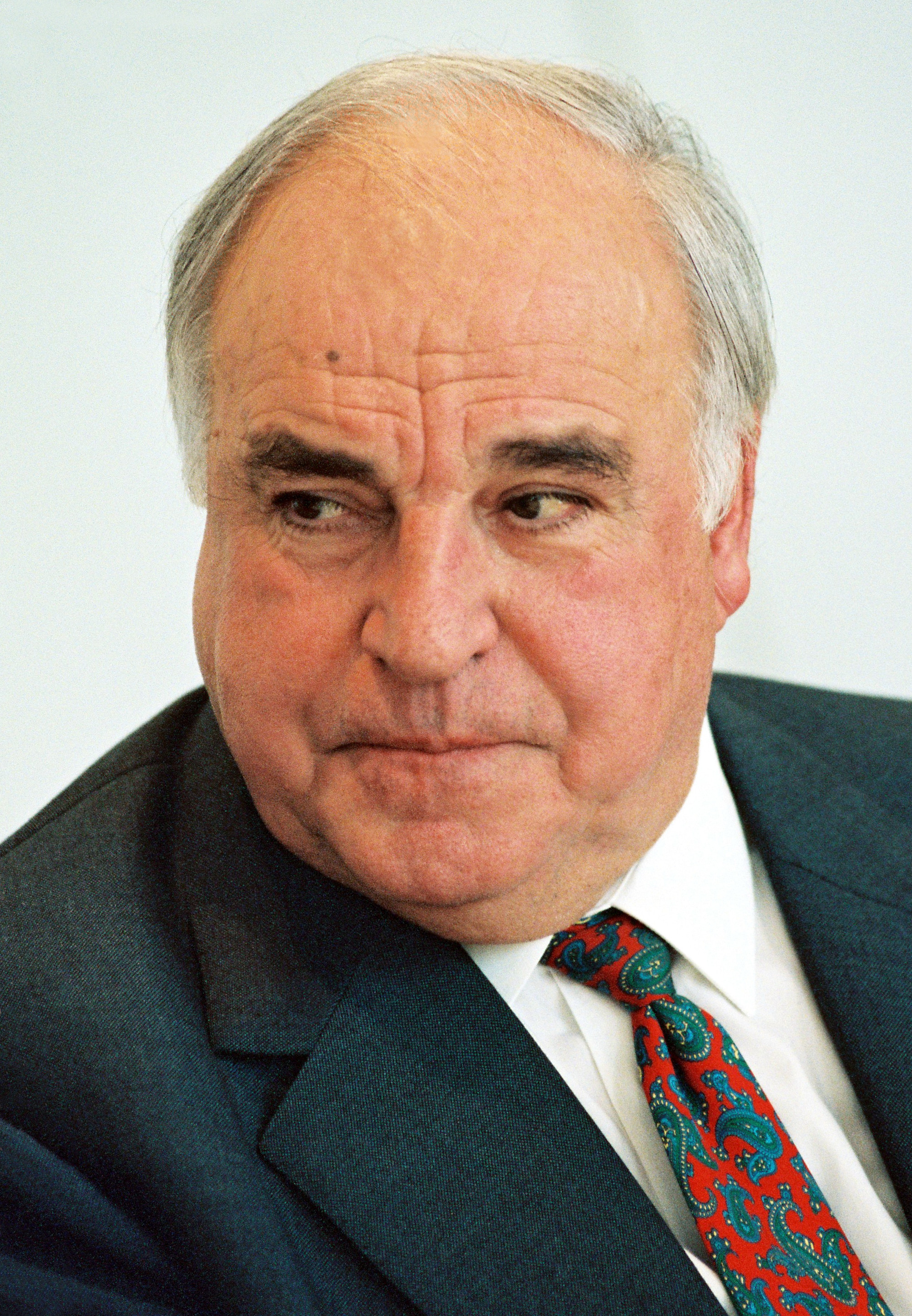
Helmut Kohl

Alumni and faculty of the university include many founders and pioneers of academic disciplines, and a large number of internationally acclaimed philosophers, poets, jurisprudents, theologians, natural and social scientists. 33 Nobel Laureates, at least 18 Leibniz laureates, and two "Oscar" winners have been associated with Heidelberg University. Nine Nobel laureates received the award during their tenure at Heidelberg.

Besides several federal ministers of Germany and prime ministers of German states, five chancellors of Germany have attended the university, the latest being Helmut Kohl, the "Chancellor of the Reunification". Heads of state or government of Belgium, Bulgaria, Greece, Nicaragua, Serbia, Thailand, a British heir apparent, a secretary general of NATO and a director of the International Peace Bureau have also been educated at Heidelberg; among them Nobel Peace laureates Charles Albert Gobat and Auguste Beernaert. Former university affiliates in the field of religion include Pope Pius II, cardinals, bishops, and with Philipp Melanchthon and Zacharias Ursinus, two key leaders of the Protestant Reformation. Outstanding university affiliates in the legal profession include a president of the International Court of Justice, two presidents of the European Court of Human Rights, a president of the International Tribunal for the Law of the Sea, a vice president of the International Criminal Court, an advocate general at the European Court of Justice, at least 16 justices of the Federal Constitutional Court of Germany, a president of the Federal Court of Justice, a president of the Federal Court of Finance, a president of the Federal Labor Court, two attorneys general of Germany, and a British law lord. In business, Heidelberg alumni and faculty notably founded, co-founded or presided over ABB; Astor corporate enterprises; BASF; BDA; Daimler AG; Deutsche Bank; EADS; Krupp AG; Siemens and Thyssen AG.

Alumni in the field of arts include classical composer Robert Schumann, philosophers Ludwig Feuerbach and Edmund Montgomery, poet Joseph Freiherr von Eichendorff and writers Christian Friedrich Hebbel, Gottfried Keller, Irene Frisch, Heinrich Hoffmann, Sir Muhammad Iqbal, National Hero of the Philippines José Rizal, W. Somerset Maugham, Jean Paul, Literature Nobel laureate Carl Spitteler, and novelist Jagoda Marinić. Amongst Heidelberg alumni in other disciplines are the "Father of Psychology" Wilhelm Wundt, the "Father of Physical Chemistry" J. Willard Gibbs, the "Father of American Anthropology" Franz Boas, Dmitri Mendeleev, who created the periodic table of elements, inventor of the two-wheeler principle Karl Drais, Alfred Wegener, who discovered the continental drift, as well as political theorist Hannah Arendt, gender theorist Judith Butler, political scientist Carl Joachim Friedrich, and sociologists Karl Mannheim, Robert E. Park and Talcott Parsons.

Philosophers Georg Wilhelm Friedrich Hegel, Karl Jaspers, Hans-Georg Gadamer, and Jürgen Habermas served as university professors, as did also the pioneering scientists Hermann von Helmholtz, Robert Wilhelm Bunsen, Gustav Robert Kirchhoff, Emil Kraepelin, the founder of scientific psychiatry, and outstanding social scientists such as Max Weber, the founding father of modern sociology.

Present faculty include Medicine Nobel Laureates Bert Sakmann (1991) and Harald zur Hausen (2008), Chemistry Nobel Laureate Stefan Hell (2014), seven Leibniz laureates, former justice of the Federal Constitutional Court of Germany Paul Kirchhof, and Rüdiger Wolfrum, the former president of the International Tribunal for the Law of the Sea.

== In fiction and popular culture ==
=== Literature ===
In 1880 Mark Twain humorously detailed his impressions of Heidelberg's student life in A Tramp Abroad. He painted a picture of the university as a school for aristocrats, where students pursued a dandy's lifestyle, and described the great influence the student corporations exerted on the whole of Heidelberg's student life.

In William Somerset Maugham's 1915 masterpiece novel Of Human Bondage, he described the one-year stay of the protagonist Philip Carey at Heidelberg University, in a largely autobiographical way. Heidelberg also featured in the respective film versions of the novel, released in 1934 (starring Leslie Howard as Philip, and Bette Davis as Mildred), 1946 (with Paul Henreid and Eleanor Parker in the lead roles), and 1964 (with Laurence Harvey and Kim Novak in the lead roles).

E. C. Gordon, the hero of Robert Heinlein's 1964 novel Glory Road, mentions his desire for a degree from Heidelberg and the dueling scars to go with it.

In Bernhard Schlink's semi-autobiographical 1995 novel The Reader, Heidelberg University is one of the main scenes of Part II. Nearly a decade after his affair with an older woman comes to a mysterious end, Michael Berg, a law student at the university, re-encounters his former lover as she defends herself in a war-crimes trial, which he observes as part of a seminar. The university is also featured in the Academy Award-winning 2008 film version The Reader, starring Kate Winslet, David Kross and Ralph Fiennes.

=== Film and television ===
The 1927 silent film The Student Prince in Old Heidelberg, based on Wilhelm Meyer-Förster's play Alt Heidelberg (1903), starring Ramón Novarro and Norma Shearer, continued Mark Twain's image of Heidelberg, showing the story of a German prince who comes to Heidelberg to study there, but falls in love with his innkeeper's daughter. Having been very popular in the first half of the 20th century, it presents the typical student life of the 19th and early 20th century, and it is today considered a masterpiece of the late silent film era. MGM's 1954 color remake The Student Prince, featuring the voice of Mario Lanza, is based on Sigmund Romberg's operetta version of the story. In 2000, a film named Anatomy with Franka Potente was set at Heidelberg and involved a secret society called the Anti-Hippocratic Society. The 2004 anime adaptation of the Naoki Urasawa manga series, Monster, contains an arc set in Heidelberg, where several characters attend the University. in The Big Bang Theory season 1, episode 11, "The Pancake Batter Anomaly," Sheldon mentions being a visiting professor at "Heidelberg" while talking to Penny.

=== Video games ===
In the Call of Duty: Zombies series of games, Dr. Edward Richtofen studies pathology at Heidelberg under the tutelage of Dr. Ludvig Maxis.

== See also ==
- List of medieval universities
- Mannheim University of Applied Sciences for jointly run programs
- Rhine Neckar Metropolitan Area
