= Heidelberg Institute for International Conflict Research =

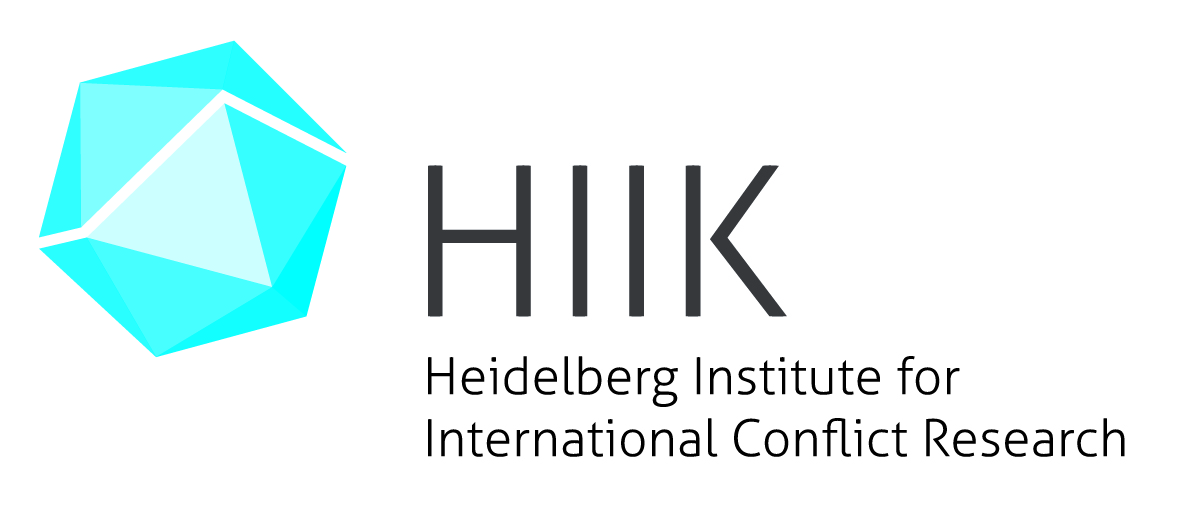
- Abbreviation: HIIK
- Formation: 1991
- Legal status: Foundation (nonprofit)
- Purpose: Peace and conflict studies
- Location: Heidelberg, Germany
- Board of directors: Vojtěch Borusík, Paul Dießelberg, Silvan Ergican, Lillie Hafner, Santiago Moncada, Rafael Uribe-Neira, Sarah Westedt
- Staff: ca. 200
- Website: hiik.de?lang=en

The Heidelberg Institute for International Conflict Research (HIIK) is an independent and interdisciplinary registered association located at the Department of Political Science at the University of Heidelberg. Since 1991, the HIIK has been committed to the distribution of knowledge about the emergence, course and settlement of interstate and intrastate political conflicts. The Conflict Barometer is published annually and contains the current research results.

== Conflict Barometer ==
The HIIK's annual publication Conflict Barometer describes the recent trends in global conflict developments, escalations, de-escalations, and settlements. Coup d'état, attempted coups d'états, as well as implemented measures of conflict resolution are also reported. It is subdivided into five world regions and presents all present conflicts in detailed charts and short descriptions. The methodological approach consists of the conflict definition and the measuring of the conflict intensity.

== Methodology after 2011 ==
Following a methodological revision in 2011, changes in the Heidelberg methodology included allocating intensities not only based on state units and calendar years, but also on the level of subnational units and calendar months. Furthermore, the establishment of intensities now follows an analysis of clearly conceived proxy indicators, used for the assessment of means and consequences of a conflict measure. This analysis continues to be based on the actions of conflict actors, as well as the communication between them. Through the conceptual refinement and standardization of data collection and documentation, the HIIK data achieves a higher degree of precision, reliability, and comprehensibility regarding information on political conflicts.

== Conflict definition ==
A political conflict is a positional difference between at least two assertive and directly involved actors regarding values relevant to a society (the conflict items including (territory, secession, decolonization, autonomy, system/ideology, national power, regional predominance, international power, resources, other)) which is carried out using observable and interrelated conflict measures that lie outside established regulatory procedures and threaten core state functions, the international order, or hold the prospect of doing so.

According to the Heidelberg (1998) methodology and ideology, the essence of a political conflict lies in a contradiction, adequately represented by the concept of a "positional difference": a positional difference is a perceived incompatibility of ideas and beliefs. It presupposes the presence of the following elements:

(1) There must be at least two entities possessing intellectual capacity and vision, and who are capable of communicating. Such an entity is called an actor.

(2) In order for the actors to sense incompatibility between their ideas and beliefs, there must be reciprocal actions and acts of communication between said actors. These actions and acts of communication are called measures.

(3) A communicating act always refers to a specific issue, an action always refers to a certain object. The subject behind a measure is called item.

For the purpose of defining the term political conflict more precisely, the three elements aforementioned shall be further defined. These elements are necessary requirements for the existence of a political conflict.

== Conflict intensities ==
State of Violence	Intensity Group	Level of Intensity	Name of Intensity	Definition
non-violent	low	1	Dispute	A political conflict is classified as a dispute if it meets all elements of the basic concept.
non-violent	low	2	Non-violent Crisis	A political conflict is classified as a non-violent crisis if physical violence is being implicitly or explicitly threatened to persons or property by at least one of the actors, or if one actor uses physical violence against property, without regarding the injury of people as acceptable. A threat of force is understood as a verbally or non-verbally communicated prospect of violent measures that is based on the conflict item. An acceptance of the injury of persons is present when the use of force against property includes the possibility of the injury of people but the violator is indifferent to this possibility.
violent	medium	3	Violent Crisis	A political conflict is classified as a violent crisis when at least one actor uses force sporadically against persons - or things in case that physical violence against people is considered acceptable. The applied means and consequences altogether are limited.
violent	high	4	Limited War	A political conflict is classified as a limited war when at least one actor uses force against persons and maybe things in a distinctive way. The applied means and consequences altogether are serious.
violent	high	5	War	A political conflict is classified as a war when at least one actor uses force massively against persons and maybe things. The applied means and consequences altogether need to be framed as extensive.

== Annual conflict summary ==
The table below presents data after the 2011 methodology revision. Violent conflicts include highly violent ones, the latter being classified into limited and full-scale wars.

Year	Conflicts total	Violent conflicts	Limited wars	Full-scale wars	Source
2018	372	213	24	16	CB 2018
2017	385	222	16	20	CB 2017
2016	402	226	20	18	CB 2016
2015	409	223	24	19	CB 2015
2014	424	223	25	21	CB 2014
2013	414	221	25	20	CB 2013
2012	396	165	25	18	CB 2012

== See also ==
- Peace and conflict studies
- Conflict resolution
