= Heidelberg University Faculty of Chemistry and Earth Sciences =

Coordinates: 49.4190°N 8.6744°E

The Faculty of Chemistry and Earth Sciences is one of twelve faculties at the University of Heidelberg. It comprises the Institute of Inorganic Chemistry, Institute of Organic Chemistry, Institute of Physical Chemistry, Institute of Geography, and Institute of Earth Sciences. The former Institute of Geology and Paleontology, Institute of Mineralogy, and Institute of Environmental Geochemistry were consolidated into the Institute of Earth Sciences. Their functions and research areas are now part of that institute.

Chemistry was established as a separate discipline at the University of Heidelberg in 1817 and Leopold Gmelin was appointed ordinary professor of chemistry and medicine. 1895 is the year lectures in physical and mathematical geography were held on a regular basis, marking the date of foundation of Institute of Geography at the university. Four years later the first professorship in geography was filled by Alfred Hettner.

== Institute of Inorganic Chemistry ==
Research at the institute centers on:

- Molecular compounds based on main-group and transition elements
- Structure-property relationships to develop sustainable catalysts and advanced materials
- Complex chemistry and molecular catalysis
- Bioinorganic chemistry
- Chemistry of nanoscale clusters
- Applied quantum chemistry and molecular modelling
- Functional materials, including N-heteropolycycles

== Institute of Organic Chemistry ==
The institute's research spans:

- Molecular chemistry: Method development, synthesis of polycyclic aromatic hydrocarbons, catalysis
- Supramolecular chemistry: Functional miniproteins, cage structures, carbon-based acceptor molecules
- Macromolecular chemistry: 2D, 3D, and 4D materials, peptide-based and functional materials

The institute participates in interdisciplinary initiatives such as:

- CaRLa (Catalysis Research Laboratory) – Joint lab with BASF
- Centre for Advanced Materials (CAM)
- InnovationLab – Science-business collaboration in the Rhine-Neckar region
- Collaborative Research Centre CRC 1249 ("N-Heteropolycycles as Functional Materials") involving multiple chemistry institutes

It hosts the following core analytical facilities:

- X-Ray Diffraction
- Mass Spectrometry
- Nuclear Magnetic Resonance (NMR)
- Microanalysis

== Institute of Physical Chemistry ==
The main research areas of the Institute of Physical Chemistry are:

- laser-induced chemical processes and laser diagnostics of technical combustion and catalytical processes
- single molecule spectroscopy of biological samples
- dynamic regulation of adhesive contacts and of the cytoskeleton architecture of biological cells using novel micro- and nanostructured materials
- design and advanced characterization of functional surfaces and interfaces
- biocompatible coatings for biotechnology and medical applications
- nanolithography and -technology
- chemical and biochemical sensors
- x-ray microscopy and holography
- theoretical studies of the electronic structure and dynamics of molecules
- theoretical investigations to reveal new phenomena in prototype neutral and charged molecular species

== Institute of Geography ==
The first professorship in geography was established in 1899, filled by Alfred Hettner.

The institute integrates natural, social, and technical sciences, emphasizing:

- Human Geography: Urban geography, migration, economic and social geography, political ecology, and sustainability transitions
- Physical Geography: Geomorphology, soil geography, hydrology, climatology, and geoecology
- Geoinformatics (GIScience): Geospatial big data, user-generated geoinformation (VGI), spatial analysis, 3D point cloud processing, and humanitarian applications

== Institute of Earth Sciences ==
The roots of this institute extend back to the first chair for mineralogy, established in 1817 by Karl Cäsar von Leonhard. The first lectures in Paleontology given in 1823 by Heinrich Georg Bronn. In 1972 German Müller established the Institute for Sediment Research, the forerunner of the Institute of Environmental Geochemistry, in 1972.

This institute's mission is to study understand the origin the Earth and its approximately 4.5 billion years development with emphasis on the changing relationships between the realms of the geosphere, water, the atmosphere, and biologic life. Its research focuses on

- Study of rocks, minerals, sediments, and geologic isotopes
- Cosmochemistry
- Environmental geochemistry
- Paleoenvironment and paleoclimate research
- Paleontology
- Archaeometry

The former institutes of Geology and Paleontology, of Mineralogy and of Environmental Geochemistry were incorporated into this organization. Mineralogy and environmental geochemistry are now the focus of research groups within this institute.

== Noted chemists and earth scientists ==
- Leopold Gmelin
- Friedrich August Kekulé von Stradonitz
- Robert Bunsen
- Victor Meyer
- Theodor Curtius
- Gustav Kirchhoff
- Hermann von Helmholtz
- Emil Erlenmeyer
- Dmitri Mendeleev
- Carl Bosch
- Alfred Hettner
- Harry Rosenbusch
- Victor Mordechai Goldschmidt
- Paul Ramdohr
- Julia Lermotova
