= Heidelberg University Faculty of Biosciences =

Faculty at the University of Heiidelberg

Coordinates: 49.4187833°N 8.6722463°E

The Faculty of Biosciences is one of twelve faculties at the University of Heidelberg. It comprises the Institute of Zoology, the Institute for Plant Science, the Neurobiology, and the Institute of Pharmacy and Molecular Biotechnology. The Faculty has around 2,000 students taught and assisted by about 70 professors, 40 lecturers and 300 scientific support personnel.

== Institute of Pharmacy and Molecular Biotechnology ==
The Institute of Pharmacy and Molecular Biotechnology (IPMB) focuses its research on the development, investigation, and application of drugs and bioactive compounds, as well as the elucidation of the molecular and cellular modes of action. Main research areas of the institute include:

- Nucleic acids and peptides as tools and targets
- Molecular evolution & proteomics
- Drug targeting and transport
- Modelling and simulation of cellular systems

The IPMB holds the main responsibility for teaching courses in Pharmacy and Molecular Biotechnology, in which about 500 students are currently enrolled. 80 PhD students work on biomedical research topics.
