= Heidelberg Center for American Studies =

The University of Heidelberg's Heidelberg Center for American Studies (HCA) is a higher education and research center. It was founded in 2004, making it the newest institute of Germany's oldest university. The Heidelberg Center for American Studies opened its first office in the spring of 2003. By October 2004, HCA was officially inaugurated. In the summer of 2006 the HCA moved into its present offices located in a historic building in the old city center of Heidelberg- Curt und Heidemarie Engelhorn Palais, Hauptstraße 120, 69117 Heidelberg. The institute is funded through public and private financial partnership. The founding director and former director of the institute is Prof. Dr. Dr. h.c. Detlef Junker. In February 2018, Prof. Dr. Welf Werner became the second director of the HCA and was also appointed Professor of American Studies at the Faculty of Economics and Social Sciences HCA makes exceptional contribution to interdisciplinary academic and cultural expertise on the United States in Europe. Through public lectures, debates, exhibitions, and panel discussions, the institute educates and provides the public with credible insight on the United States as a nation, and an important transatlantic partner. The Center facilitates discussions between academia and the public, creates and strengthens transatlantic networks. The HCA offers B.A., M.A., and Ph.D. programs in American studies. Students are competitively selected, receive first class education and are mentored by highly qualified professors/scholars.

== Higher education ==
The University of Heidelberg introduced the MA in American Studies (MAS) at the HCA in 2004. The Establishment of a MAS program was the first order of Business for the HCA. It is a 4-semester program which admits up to 20 students per year, and it attracts talented and ambitious graduate students from multinational backgrounds. The program's curriculum includes classes in economics, geography, history, literary and cultural studies, political science, and religious history; it is one of the few American Studies programs in Germany with a curriculum that includes economics.

In 2006, the HCA commenced its Ph.D. in American Studies program. It is a structured three-year English-language, tuition free program, open to German and international applicants. The program equips candidates with skills needed to conduct independent scholarly research in the fields of American history, politics, literature and culture, geography, and religion. Students pursuing a degree in other disciplines can apply to the Ph.D. in American Studies program if their research project is strongly related to the United States. Graduates of the program are awarded either a "Doktor der Philosophie (Dr. phil.)" or a "Doctor of Philosophy (Ph.D.)" degree. The HCA supports individual doctoral projects as well as international and interdisciplinary research cooperation.

In 2010, the HCA introduced a successful program for undergraduate students: a BA in American Studies (BAS). The BAS program is a competitive, multi-disciplinary and interdisciplinary program that admits up to 25 students annually. It emphasizes one-to-one assistance/mentoring. The BAS program provides the option to specialize in geography or religious studies, and to obtain an additional legal certification.

The HCA equips students with the ability to conduct various research on the American society, become experts in analyzing issues in the United States, and prepare them for jobs requiring expertise in American affairs.

== Research ==
The HCA holds various conferences, symposia, exhibitions, workshops, and seminars which sets the institute apart as a distinguished center for interdisciplinary research and a facilitator of transatlantic academic exchange The HCA is home to resident scholars who have published academic books/articles and made remarkable contributions to the field of American Studies. In addition, it is home to visiting scholars/researchers. Some of the main research projects undertaken by the institute include "Authority and Trust in American Culture, Society, History, and Politics", "Mobile Spaces: Urban Practices in Transcultural Perspective", and "Protest, Culture, and Society: Europe and North America"

Since 2004, the institute has run an annual HCA Spring Academy. HCA Spring Academy is a week-long conference attracting Ph.D. candidates with research projects on the United States. The principal aim of the Spring Academy is to establish an international network of Ph.D. students in the field of American studies. From 2004 to 2017, the HCA Spring Academy hosted 289 PhD candidates from Africa, Asia, Australia, Europe, the Middle-East, North America, and South-Central America. The HCA established the Spring Academy Network for American Studies in 2009, to further strengthen participants' ability to collaborate/network after the Spring Academy. John Deere has been an important partner and supporter of the annual HCA Spring Academy since 2005. HCA Spring Academy Alumni occupy various academic positions in reputable academic institutions, are excelling in various fields, and influencing change, nationally and internationally.

Since 2010, the institute has awarded the "Rolf Kentner Dissertation Prize" to Ph.D. candidates with outstanding work in the field of American studies. The dissertation prize is sponsored by Rolf Kentner, the chairman of the Schurman Society for American History, and each year, a winner is endowed with 1,000 Euros

In 2011, the HCA and the Faculty of Theology in Heidelberg University established the James W.C. Pennington Award. The 44th president of the United States, Barack Obama sent official greetings to the HCA expressing his gratitude for the initiative which pays tribute to Pennington and recognizes scholars who have done distinguished work on topics important to Pennington. The award is presented to scholars after a month-long stay in Heidelberg to engage in research and discuss topics such as slavery, emancipation, peace, education, reform, civil rights, religion, and intercultural understanding Albert J. Raboteau was the first recipient of the award.

In 2012, the Jonathan Edwards Center Germany was established. The center is a partnership between the University of Heidelberg's Department of Theology, the HCA, and Jonathan Edwards Center at the Yale Divinity School The goal of Jonathan Edwards Center Germany is to promote research and teaching on early American religious history, Jonathan Edwards, the tradition of New England Puritanism, and Edward's legacy in contemporary Christianity

== Forum for public debate ==
As a forum for public debate, the HCA facilitates discussions between the academic community, the general public, the business community, the political sphere, and the media. The HCA presents current research in the field of American Studies to the public through lecture series and its Baden-Württemberg Seminar which began in the spring of 2007 as a lecture series with fellows of the American Academy in Berlin. In 2009, the HCA assumed full responsibility for the Baden-Württemberg Seminar which takes place each Spring and Fall. The HCA invites distinguished scholars, public policy experts, journalists, writers, and artists to present their current work, discuss issues of transatlantic interest, or read from their writings at selected institutions throughout the state of Baden-Württemberg.

Since 2011, HCA has organized a yearly Spring exhibition of works pertinent to American history, culture, literature, and politics. Some of the exhibitions include "Behind Barbed Wire – Prisoners of War in the United States and Germany" which shed light on the lives of German and American Prisoners of War (POW) during World War II and "Black Cowboys, German Indians" which features photographs of Black Cowboys and Native Americans/German Indians. Exhibited materials/works are made available for individuals from all walks of life to observe and educate themselves on the American society.

The HCA regularly hosts lectures and lecture series as well as keynote addresses on U.S. affairs and transatlantic relations. A lecture series "Typisch Amerikanisch" (“Typically American”) was offered every winter from 2002 to 2006. Annual series were organized around a central theme, such as foreign policy, multiculturalism, or the economy of the United States.

== Development and goals ==
The institution aims to maintain its reputation as an institute for higher education, a center for interdisciplinary research, a forum for public debate, and a contributor to interdisciplinary academic and cultural expertise on the United States in Europe.
