= Heidelberg University Faculty of Behavioural Sciences and Empirical Cultural Sciences =

Coordinates: 49.4098299°N 8.6861853°E

The Faculty of Behavioural Sciences and Empirical Cultural Studies is one of twelve faculties at the University of Heidelberg.

The Faculty comprises the Institute of Psychology, the Institute of Social and Cultural Anthropology, the Department of Education, the Institute of Sport and Sport Science, and the Institute of Gerontology. The faculty is headed by a dean. From 2012 to 2014, Professor Dr. Klaus Fiedler was dean.

== Institute of Psychology ==
The Institute of Psychology was founded in 1933. It consists of Departments for Biological & Developmental Psychology, Clinical Psychology, Cognitive Psychology, Differential Psychology, Gender & Health Psychology, Gerontology, Organizational Psychology, Psychological Methods, Social Psychology.

Nearly 500 students are enrolled in research-oriented courses for Bachelor of Science Psychology and Master of Science Psychology (with two tracks: (a) developmental and Clinical Psychology; (b) organizational behavior and adaptive cognition). In 2010, for the yearly 100 BSc study places more than 4500 applications were made.

== Institute of Gerontology ==
The Institute of Gerontology was founded in 1986.
