= Daniel Tossanus =

French Reformed theologian (1541–1602)

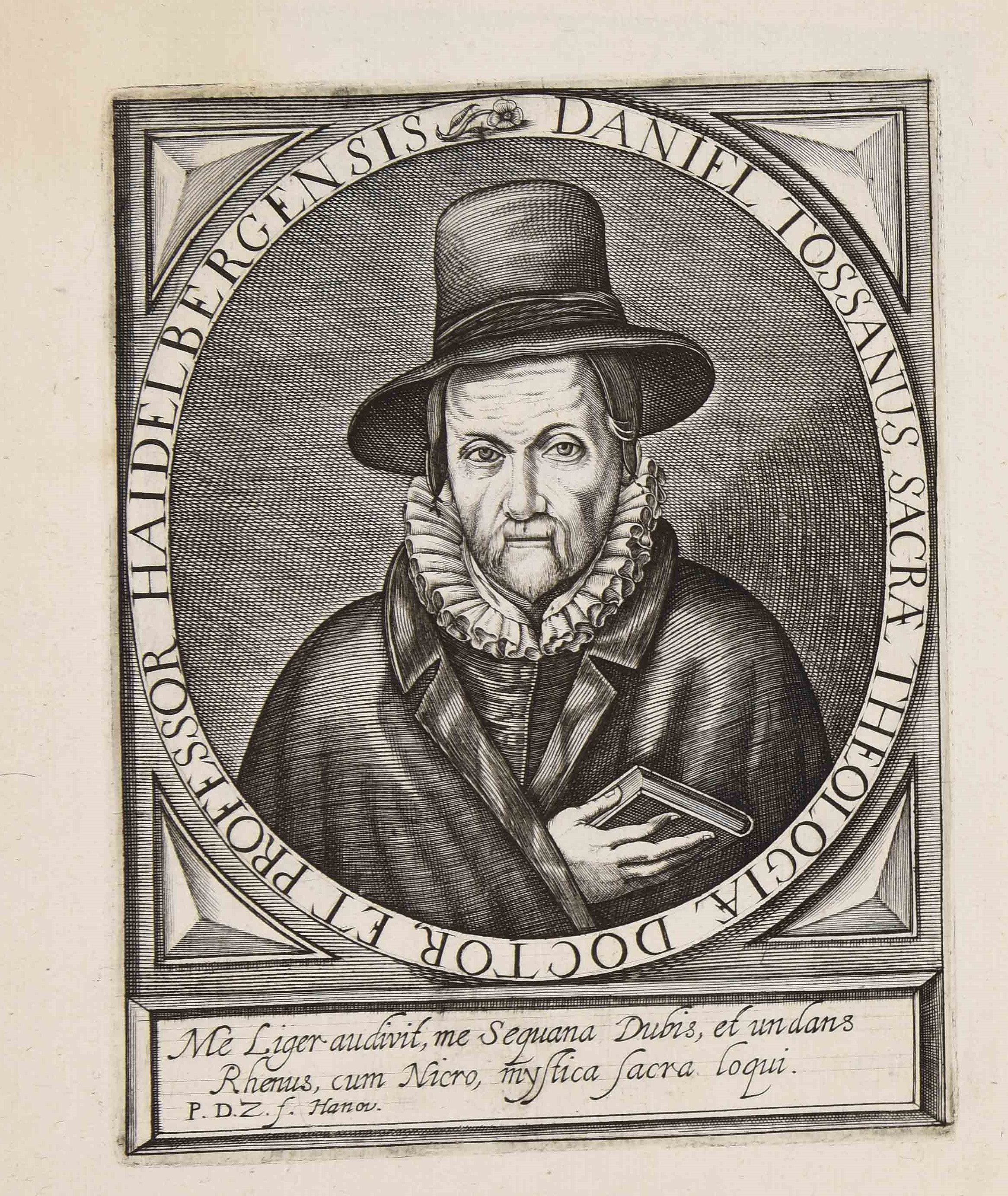
Daniel Tossanus

Daniel Tossanus (Toussain, Toussaint) (1541–1602) was a French Reformed theologian.

== Life ==
He was born at Montbéliard on 15 July 1541, the son of Pierre Toussain. He was educated at Basel and Tübingen. Returning to France he preached for six months in his native town, and went to Orléans, 1560, where, after being a teacher of Hebrew, he was ordained minister of the local Reformed church in 1561. In 1568 he was forced to flee with other Protestants, but was soon discovered and imprisoned for two weeks. He then left with his family to Montargis, where he was protected by the duchess of Ferrara until the king of France demanded the expulsion of all Huguenots.

He now sought refuge in Sancerre, and after a year returned to Montbéliard. Here he was charged with teaching Calvinistic and Zwinglian heresies; his reply was an affirmation of his Lutheran belief. In 1571 he was recalled to Orléans, and held service in the castle Isle, a few miles away. At the news of the massacre on St. Bartholomew's Day, he left just in time to escape the massacre and pillage at Isle the next day; and he was concealed by a Roman Catholic nobleman at Montargis and later by the duchess in a tower of her castle. In November 1572, he was able to return to his father at Montbéliard, but Lutheran intolerance again drove him out, and he accepted a call to the French refugees at Basel.

In March 1573, he was appointed chaplain to the Count Palatine Frederick III at Heidelberg, but in 1576 the Calvinistic Frederick was succeeded by his son, the Lutheran Louis VI, and the Reformed were expelled. They found a Calvinist patron, however, in John Casimir, the brother of the count, at Neustadt, where Tossanus became inspector of churches and also helped found an academy in which he was one of the teachers. After the death of Zacharias Ursinus, he was also preacher to the refugees' church of St. Lambert. In 1583 Louis VI died, and John Casimir became regent. Calling Tossanus onto his council, he expelled the Lutherans from Heidelberg, and Tossanus later became professor of theology, and in 1584, rector.

== Family ==
Paul Tossanus was his son. His daughter Maria was mother of Theodore Haak.

== Works ==
As an author he was prolific, producing 33 works, listed in F. W. Cuno, Daniel Tossanus (Amsterdam, 1898).
