= Martin Dibelius =

German Protestant theologian (1883–1947)

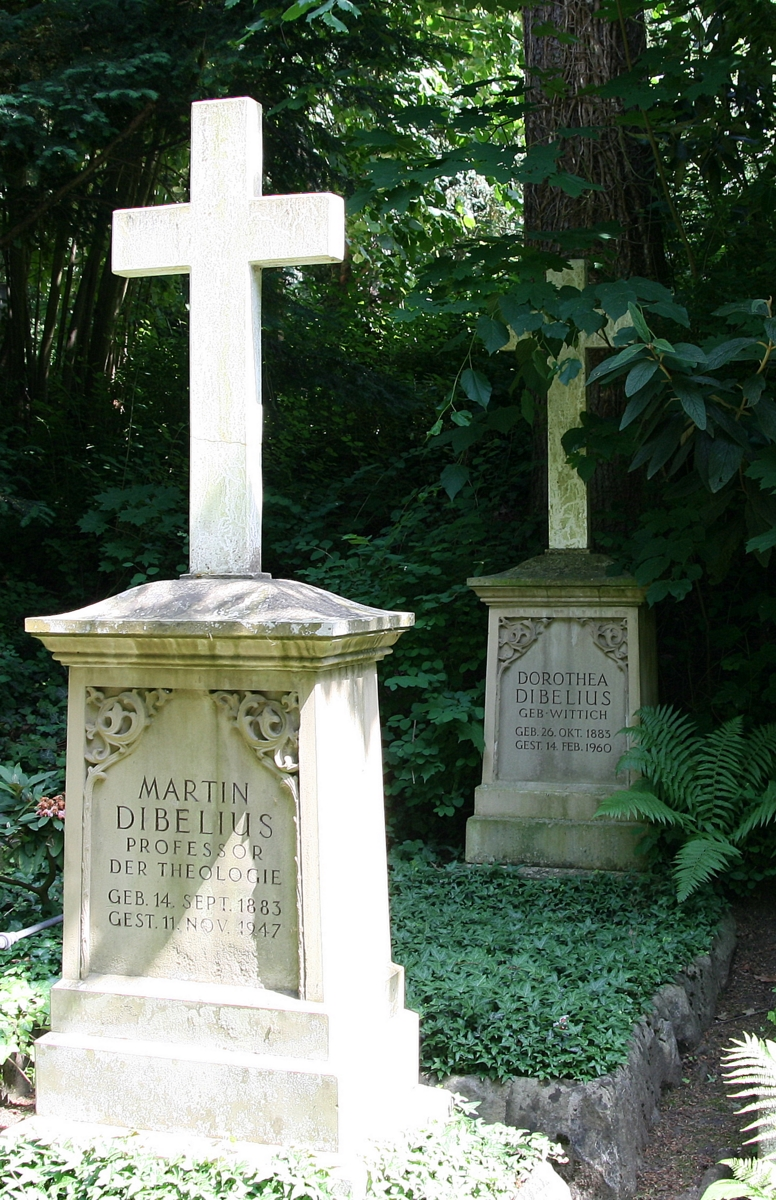
Dibelius's grave in Heidelberg

Martin Franz Dibelius (1883–1947) was a German Protestant theologian and New Testament professor at the University of Heidelberg.

Dibelius was born in Dresden, Germany, on September 14, 1883. Along with Rudolf Bultmann, he helped define a period in research about the historical Jesus characterized by skepticism toward the possibility of describing Jesus with historical certainty. In this capacity he is often regarded as an early pioneer of New Testament form criticism, a highly analytical review of literary forms within the New Testament.

After studying at multiple universities, he eventually ended up as a teacher of New Testament exegesis and criticism at Heidelberg University. He is well known for portraying Jesus' Sermon on the Mount as reflecting ideals that are impossible to live up to in what he considered a fallen world.

He married Dorothea Wittich in 1908.

He was made a full member of the Heidelberg Academy of Sciences in 1926; he was also heavily involved in politics during the 1920s.

He died in Heidelberg on November 11, 1947.

== Select publications ==
Dibelius’s publications include;

- Die Geisterwelt im Glauben des Paulus (1909)
- Die urchristliche Überlieferung von Johannes dem Täufer (1911)
- Dibelius, Martin (1926). Geschichte der urchristlichen Literatur.
- ——— (1966). Die Pastoralbriefe. Handbuch zum Neuen Testament. Vol. 13 (4th, enlarged edition by Hans Conzelmann ed.). Tübingen.)
