= Journal of the History of International Law =

- Discipline: History, international law
- Language: English, French
- Edited by: Anne Peters

Publication details
- History: 1999-present
- Publisher: Martinus Nijhoff Publishers, Max Planck Institute for Comparative Public Law and International Law, Heidelberg
- Frequency: Biannually

Standard abbreviations
- ISO 4: J. Hist. Int. Law

Indexing
- ISSN: 1388-199X

Links
- Journal homepage; Journal page at editors home institute

The Journal of the History of International Law (French: Revue d'histoire du droit international) is a biannual peer-reviewed academic journal covering the history of international law. It is published by Martinus Nijhoff Publishers and the Max Planck Institute for Comparative Public Law and International Law, Heidelberg. The journal is abstracted and indexed by Scopus.
