= Paul Tossanus =

Paul Tossanus (Toussain; 1572–1634) was a Huguenot minister, who spent most of his life in Germany.

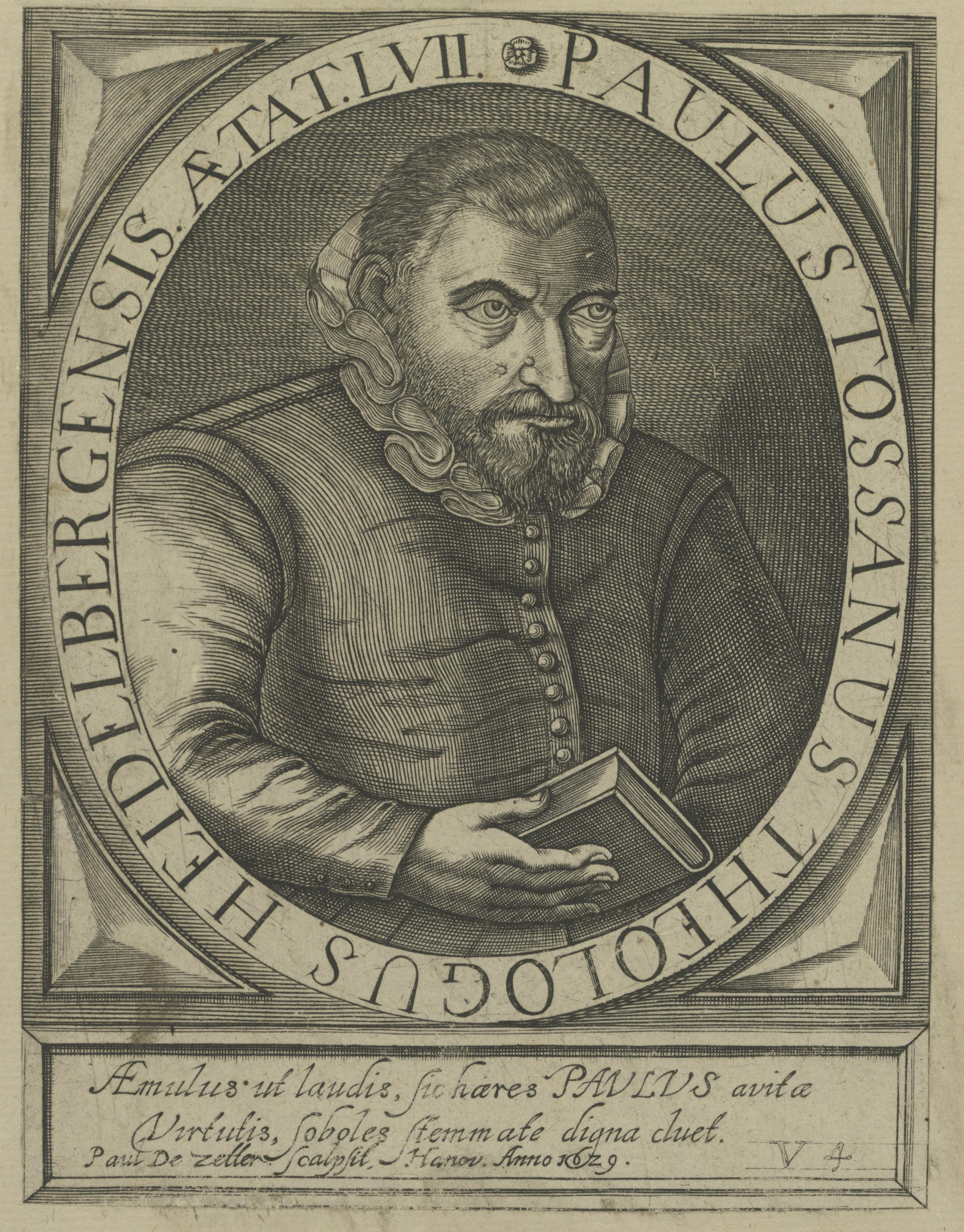
Paul Tossanus, 1629 engraving by Paul de Zetter

== Life ==
He was born at Château de Montargis, owned by Renée of France, and was the son of Daniel Tossanus. The family moved to Heidelberg the next year, at that time ruled by Frederick III, Elector Palatine, a Calvinist. Frederick's death and the accession of the Lutheran Louis VI, Elector Palatine saw the family move to Lambrecht; but after his death in 1583 they returned, and Paul continued his education in the Palatinate, graduating M.A. in 1592.

In 1618 he was sent, with Abraham Scultetus and Heinrich Alting, to represent the Palatinate at the Synod of Dort.

The outbreak of the Thirty Years' War in the Palatinate sent him in exile, in Hanau.

Theodore Haak was his nephew.

== Views ==
In a move towards eirenicism in the continuing controversies between Lutherans and Calvinists, he suggested dropping those labels, and debating only the distinctions between the public confessions, rather than attacks on individual theologians.
