= Walther Schücking Institute for International Law =

Law school in Kiel, Germany

Coordinates: 54°20′17″N 10°07′33″E

The Walther Schücking Institute for International Law is an institute of the Faculty of Law at Kiel University in Kiel, Germany.

It is the oldest university institute for public international law in Germany. The institute ranks among the top three international law institutes within Germany and has a great reputation throughout Europe.

== Foundation and Historical Development ==
The Walther Schücking Institute for International Law was founded in 1914 as the Kiel Institute for International Law, making it the oldest university institute for international law in Germany. Since its foundation, the institute has seen itself as a place for scholarly reflection on international law and its contribution to the maintenance of peace.

=== German Empire and Weimar Republic ===
After plans to establish a multidisciplinary "Royal Institute for the Science of Global Relations" failed, the Institute for International Law (initially known until 1918 as the "Royal Seminar for International Law") was founded in February 1914 alongside the Institute for the World Economy. Its founding director was Theodor Niemeyer, a professor of Roman Law who had held a lectureship in international and colonial law since 1911.

In its early years, the institute focused on scholarly analysis of World War I and its causes. After the war, attention shifted to the post-war order and the League of Nations.

In 1926, Walther Schücking – a committed pacifist and early advocate of an international peace order – was appointed as Niemeyer's successor to the newly established chair of international and private international law in Kiel. Under his leadership, the institute developed into a leading center for international legal research, where figures such as Jean Spiropoulos, Paul Guggenheim, and Walter Schätzel worked as assistants. Key areas of research included the League of Nations, international jurisdiction, and post-war settlement issues. Together with Hans Wehberg, Schücking published a widely respected commentary on the Covenant of the League of Nations. The institute also launched new publication series on the codification and development of international law and collaborated with the German Foreign Office in publishing translations of the jurisprudence of the Permanent Court of International Justice.

Schücking's academic work was closely linked to his political engagement, including service as a member of the German Reichstag (for the German Democratic Party) and as a member of the German delegation to the Paris Peace Conference. In 1930, he became the first and only German judge elected to the Permanent Court of International Justice in The Hague.

=== National Socialism ===
Shortly after the Nazis came to power, Walther Schücking was granted leave in April 1933 and removed from office in November of that year under the "Law for the Restoration of the Professional Civil Service" due to "political unreliability." His chair was restructured to focus on public and economic law and assigned to Ernst Rudolf Huber.

From 1934 onward, the institute was headed by Walther Schoenborn, a German nationalist professor who had been part of the Kiel faculty since 1920. Due in part to his leadership and the Nazi regime's initial lack of interest in international law, the institute initially avoided close association with the emerging "Kiel School". (Until 1937, it still maintained a section on League of Nations issues.)

This changed in 1936 when Paul Ritterbusch was appointed director of the institute and Rector of Kiel University. Under his leadership, the institute was restructured as the "Institute for Politics and International Law" and aligned with Nazi Großraum (sphere-of-influence) politics. At the institute's 25th anniversary in 1939, Carl Schmitt delivered his famous lecture on "The International Law of the Greater Space with a Prohibition of Intervention for Powers Foreign to the Space".

Ritterbusch, who had been tasked by the Reich Ministry of Education with coordinating the "war effort of the German humanities" ("Aktion Ritterbusch"), left Kiel for Berlin in 1941. The interim directorship of the institute was taken over by Karl Larenz until Hermann von Mangoldt assumed the chair and directorship in 1944.

=== After World War II ===
Under von Mangoldt, the institute was reoriented both scientifically and institutionally. This period saw the joint founding (with the University of Hamburg's international law center) of the "Jahrbuch für internationales Recht" (Yearbook of International Law) in 1947/48 – now the German Yearbook of International Law – and the establishment in 1948 of Germany's first United Nations Depository Library in Kiel. After von Mangoldt's sudden death, Eberhard Menzel was appointed as his successor and managing director of the institute in 1955. He worked alongside Viktor Böhmert, a former assistant to Schücking, who was later succeeded in 1971 by Wilhelm Kewenig.

Under Menzel, the institute's thematic focus broadened to include the United Nations, peace and disarmament, German-German relations, human rights, law of the sea, space law, as well as comparative constitutional law and private international law.

Among the assistants of this period were Dietrich Rauschning, Knut Ipsen, Rainer Lagoni, and notably Jost Delbrück, who succeeded Menzel in 1976 and led the institute for 25 years – jointly with Rüdiger Wolfrum from 1982 to 1993. Delbrück focused primarily on peace and conflict law and human rights, while Wolfrum specialized in the law of the sea and the law of global commons. These topics were approached through a more interdisciplinary lens than in previous generations.

=== Since 1995: Walther Schücking Institute ===
In 1995, the institute was renamed the Walther Schücking Institute for International Law in honor of its former director and his vision of "peace through law".

Notable alumni of recent decades include: Karl-Ulrich Meyn, Eibe Riedel, Hans-Joachim Schütz, Klaus Dicke, Stephan Hobe, Doris König, Anne Peters, Christian Tietje, and Christian J. Tams.

=== Directors of the Institute ===
Director	Term
Theodor Niemeyer	1914 – 1925
Walther Schücking	1926 – 1933
Walther Schoenborn	1934 – 1940
Paul Ritterbusch	1937 – 1941
Hermann von Mangoldt	1943 – 1953
Viktor Böhmert	1955 – 1970
Eberhard Menzel	1955 – 1975
Wilhelm A. Kewenig	1971 – 1983
Jost Delbrück	1976 – 2001
Wilfried Fiedler	1977 – 1984
Rüdiger Wolfrum	1982 – 1993
Rainer Hofmann	1997 – 2004
Andreas Zimmermann	2001 – 2009
Thomas Giegerich	2006 – 2012
Alexander Proelß	2007 – 2010
Kerstin von der Decken	2011 – 2022
Nele Matz-Lück	2011 – present
Andreas von Arnauld	2013 – present
Thomas Kleinlein	2023 – present

=== The Institute Today ===
The Walther Schücking Institute is today one of the most respected research institutions for international law in Germany. Current research focuses include:

- General international law and its foundations
- Human rights protection
- Security law
- Environmental law
- Law of the sea
- European law
- Comparative constitutional law

The institute is currently led by Nele Matz-Lück, Andreas von Arnauld, and Thomas Kleinlein.

== Library and UN Depository Library ==
The institute hosts Germany's largest and oldest university library specializing in international law. The library contains more than 83,000 volumes and around 90 journal subscriptions. Since October 1948, it has served as one of six United Nations Depository Libraries in Germany, collecting all generally distributed English-language UN documents and publications.

== Publications ==
Since 1948, the institute has published the German Yearbook of International Law (GYIL), formerly known as the Jahrbuch für Internationales Recht. Another key publication is the book series "Publications of the Walther Schücking Institute for International Law at the University of Kiel", published by Duncker & Humblot.

== Jost Delbrück Prize ==
To honour its long-time director Jost Delbrück, since 2020, the institute awards the Jost Delbrück Prize every two years. This early-career award recognizes outstanding dissertations in the field of peace and conflict-related international law. It aims to promote scholarly engagement with pressing international legal questions and foster young talent.

== Recurring Events at the Institute ==
Since 2017, the institute has hosted the annual Walther Schücking Lecture, delivered by prominent figures in international law from academia or practice, celebrating Schücking's vision of peace through law and international cooperation. Past speakers include: Philip Alston, Christine Chinkin, Alan Boyle, Eibe Riedel, Bruno Simma, Liesbeth Lijnzaad, and Ernst Ulrich Petersmann. The "Völkerrechtliche Tagesthemen" (Current Issues in International Law) lecture series builds on the tradition of "international law discussions of current political issues" initiated by Theodor Niemeyer in 1912, offering public analysis of current developments in international and European law.

The institute also organizes symposia, public lecture series, and since 1989 has coached Kiel University student teams in the Philip C. Jessup International Law Moot Court. The institute most recently hosted the German National Rounds in 2018.

== Website ==
Walther Schücking Institute for International Law – Official Website https://www.uni-kiel.de/en/law/research/wsi
