= Max Planck Encyclopedia of Public International Law =

Online encyclopedia

- Author: As of 2010, over 800 contributors from 74 countries
- Language: English
- Subject: Public International Law
- Genre: Reference encyclopedia
- Publisher: Oxford University Press
- Media type: As of summer 2008 online publication. Additionally as of 2012 hardbound 10 volume publication

The Max Planck Encyclopedia of Public International Law (MPEPIL) is an online encyclopedia dealing with international law. It was published under the auspices of Professor Rüdiger Wolfrum, Director of the Max Planck Institute for Comparative Public Law and International Law until his successor Anne Peters became general editor in 2021. The initiative to compile the MPEPIL began in 2004 and the online version launched in September 2008. It represents a new edition of the Encyclopedia of Public International Law published between 1991 and 2001 by Rudolf Bernhardt. In February 2012, the print edition was published by Oxford University Press. The encyclopedia is peer reviewed.

In a 2013 review of the work, Sean D. Murphy wrote that: "All told, there is little question that the Max Planck Encyclopedia lives up to its claim as the definitive reference work for international law"

== Description ==
MPEPIL is an updated, comprehensive work covering the essential topics in international law. The new work is not just a revision of Rudolf Bernhardt's encyclopedia. Instead, new authors completely rewrote nearly all entries. MPEPIL includes numerous new topics in order to capture the latest developments in international law. To do justice to the changing nature of the law, an increased emphasis has been placed on the relevance of each keyword for contemporary international law. Particular attention has been paid to the contextualization of each topic within international law as well as the presentation of current trends while maintaining a focus on the mainstream/majority view. In order to reach the goal of avoiding a purely Eurocentric perspective the assistance of academics and practitioners from various legal backgrounds and perspectives was obtained already in the early stages of the undertaking. The intention is that MPEPIL is a work that reflects international law from a global perspective while taking into account also regional views.

== Contents ==
MPEPIL currently contains 1,618 articles. A total of 1,700 articles are planned for the site, with four content updates per year. Upon completion, the MPEPIL will cover the following overarching subject areas and article types:

- Air law and law of outer space
- Diplomacy and consular relations
- Foreign relations
- History of international law
- Human rights
- Immunities
- Individuals and non-state actors
- International co-operation
- International courts and tribunals
- International criminal law
- International economic law and relations
- International environmental law
- International humanitarian law
- International organizations: general aspects
- International procedural law
- International responsibility
- Law of the sea
- Law of treaties
- Overview articles
- Procedural law in international organizations
- Regional organizations, institutions and developments
- Relationship between international and domestic law
- Settlement of disputes
- Sources, foundations and principles of international law
- Specific armed conflicts
- Specific cases and decisions
- Specific geographic issues
- Specific treaties and instruments
- Statehood, jurisdiction of states, organs of states
- Subjects of international law
- Territory
- Theories of international law
- Universal international organizations and institutions
- Use of force, war, peace and neutrality.

Given that the information contained in many of the articles may become outdated, authors are asked to update their articles once a year in the first three years after electronic publication of the entire MPEPIL.

== Personnel and management ==
=== Contributors ===
Over 800 authors from around the globe (74 countries) have agreed to submit articles to the MPEPIL. Among them are not only distinguished professors, judges and legal practitioners, who are involved in international law, but also up-and-coming academics and researchers. The latter have been included in order to promote the progressive character of the MPEPIL.

=== Advisory board ===
An Advisory Board, consisting of renowned experts in various fields of international law, applies its expertise to ensure the quality and excellence of each article. They carefully read and evaluate each article, keeping in mind the high standard of the publication. The members of the Advisory Board include: Rudolf Bernhardt, Armin von Bogdandy, Edith Brown Weiss, Jean-Pierre Cot, Yoram Dinstein, Thomas Franck, Jochen Abr. Frowein, Meinhard Hilf, Rahmatullah Khan, Martti Koskenniemi, Thomas Läufer, Thomas A. Mensah, Hanspeter Neuhold, Francisco Orrego Vicuña, W. Michael Reisman, Bruno Simma, Daniel Thürer, Christian Tomuschat, Tullio Treves, Rüdiger Wolfrum, and Michael Wood.

=== Staff ===
At the Max Planck Institute, a number of persons are or have been involved in the MPEPIL project since its initiation. The staff includes: Managing Editors, responsible for preparatory work, oversight over the project as a whole and to that end, involvement at all stages of the editorial and publication process, all the while ensuring a high level of quality for each article. Internal legal advisors, who are Senior Research Fellows at the Max Planck Institute, assist with quality-assurance in their supervision of the overarching themes as well as examination of articles. Editorial Staff consists of Support Staff, Editors, and Student Assistants. The Support Staff assist in the daily administration of the project. Editors review each article to ensure they are in keeping with the project's style guidelines and make certain the validity and content of the authors’ statements.

== Availability ==
The MPEPIL is available in electronic form. Oxford University Press (OUP) started the online publication in September 2008 with more than 450 articles. Regular updates will steadily expand the MPEPIL until all of its content can be accessed online. As of December 2012, the total number of articles stood at 1,618. In 2012, a print edition was published.

== Oxford Law Citator ==
The MPEPIL features the Oxford Law Citator. This system links together OUP online materials that mention or discuss each other, and provides the user with further information on all references which are available online.

== See also ==
- Lists of encyclopedias
- List of online encyclopedias
- Oxford Law Citator
