= Head of state =

Public persona of a sovereign state

A head of state is the highest ranking official in a sovereign state. They may also be the head of government, or they may merely perform ceremonial duties. A head of state can be a monarch (such as a king or a prince) or a president.

In a parliamentary system, such as India or the United Kingdom, the head of state usually has mostly ceremonial powers, with a separate head of government. Conversely, in presidential systems, the head of state is also the head of government.

Former French president Charles de Gaulle, while developing the current Constitution of France (1958), said that the head of state should embody l'esprit de la nation ("the spirit of the nation").

== Constitutional models ==
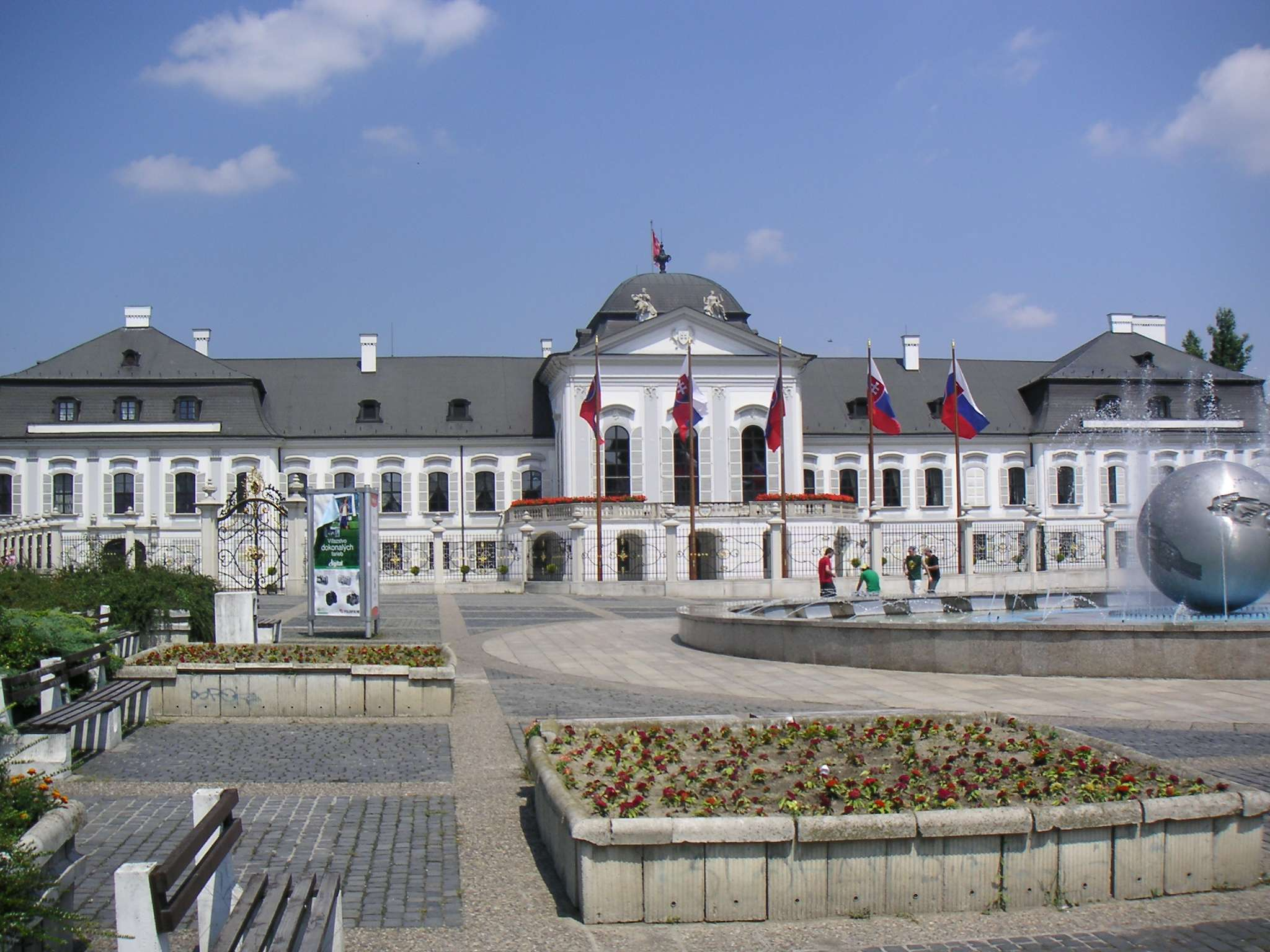
Grassalkovich Palace in Bratislava is the seat of the president of Slovakia.

Some academic writers discuss states and governments in terms of "models". An independent nation state normally has a head of state, and determines the extent of its head's executive powers of government or formal representational functions.

=== Parliamentary system ===
World's parliamentary states (as of 2026): Republics with an executive president elected by a parliament Parliamentary republics Parliamentary constitutional monarchies in which the monarch usually exercises power only on government advice Presidential republics, one-party states, and other forms of government

The Constitution of Japan (日本国憲法, Nihonkoku-Kenpō) was drawn up under the Allied occupation that followed World War II and was intended to replace the previous militaristic and quasi-absolute monarchy system with a form of liberal democracy parliamentary system. The constitution explicitly vests all executive power in the Cabinet, who is chaired by the prime minister (articles 65 and 66) and responsible to the Diet (articles 67 and 69). The emperor is defined in the constitution as "the symbol of the State and of the unity of the people" (article 1), and is generally recognised throughout the world as the Japanese head of state. Although the emperor formally appoints the prime minister to office, article 6 of the constitution requires him to appoint the candidate "as designated by the Diet", without any right to decline appointment. Perhaps the most explicit reference comes in article 7, which states the emperor "perform[s] only such acts in matters of state as are provided for in this constitution and shall have not have powers related to government". He is a ceremonial figurehead with no independent discretionary powers related to the governance of Japan.

Since the passage in Sweden of the 1974 Instrument of Government, the Swedish monarch no longer has many of the standard parliamentary system head of state functions that had previously belonged to him or her, as was the case in the preceding 1809 Instrument of Government. Today, the speaker of the Riksdag appoints (following a vote in the Riksdag) the prime minister and terminates their commission following a vote of no confidence or voluntary resignation. Cabinet members are appointed and dismissed at the sole discretion of the prime minister. Laws and ordinances are promulgated by two Cabinet members in unison signing "On Behalf of the Government" and the government—not the monarch—is the high contracting party with respect to international treaties. The remaining official functions of the sovereign, by constitutional mandate or by unwritten convention, are to open the annual session of the Riksdag, receive foreign ambassadors and sign the letters of credence for Swedish ambassadors, chair the foreign advisory committee, preside at the special Cabinet council when a new prime minister takes office, and to be kept informed by the prime minister on matters of state.

=== Semi-presidential systems ===
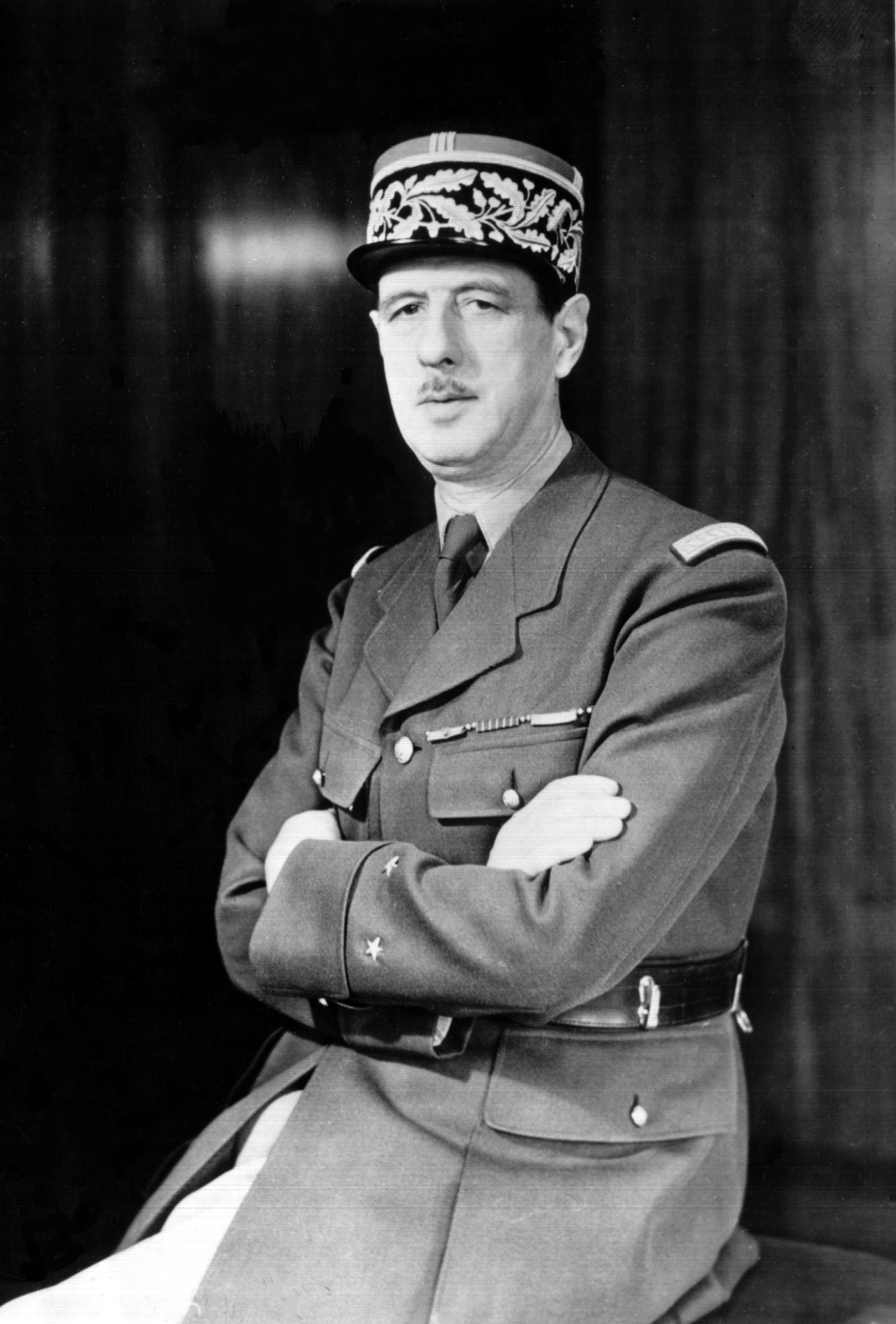
Charles de Gaulle, President and head of state of the French Fifth Republic (1959–1969)

Semi-presidential systems combine features of presidential and parliamentary systems. This form of governmental structure initially appeared in Finland and Germany in 1919. Its adoption remained limited until the democratic transitions of the 1990s, when it became the preferred model for emerging democracies. Countries select this system for diverse motives, such as Turkey's 2007 amendment designed to increase presidential influence. Kenya implemented it in 2008 to decrease executive authority following a political standoff. According to Sophia Moestrup this hybrid model receives far less academic attention than purely presidential or parliamentary systems.

=== Presidential system ===
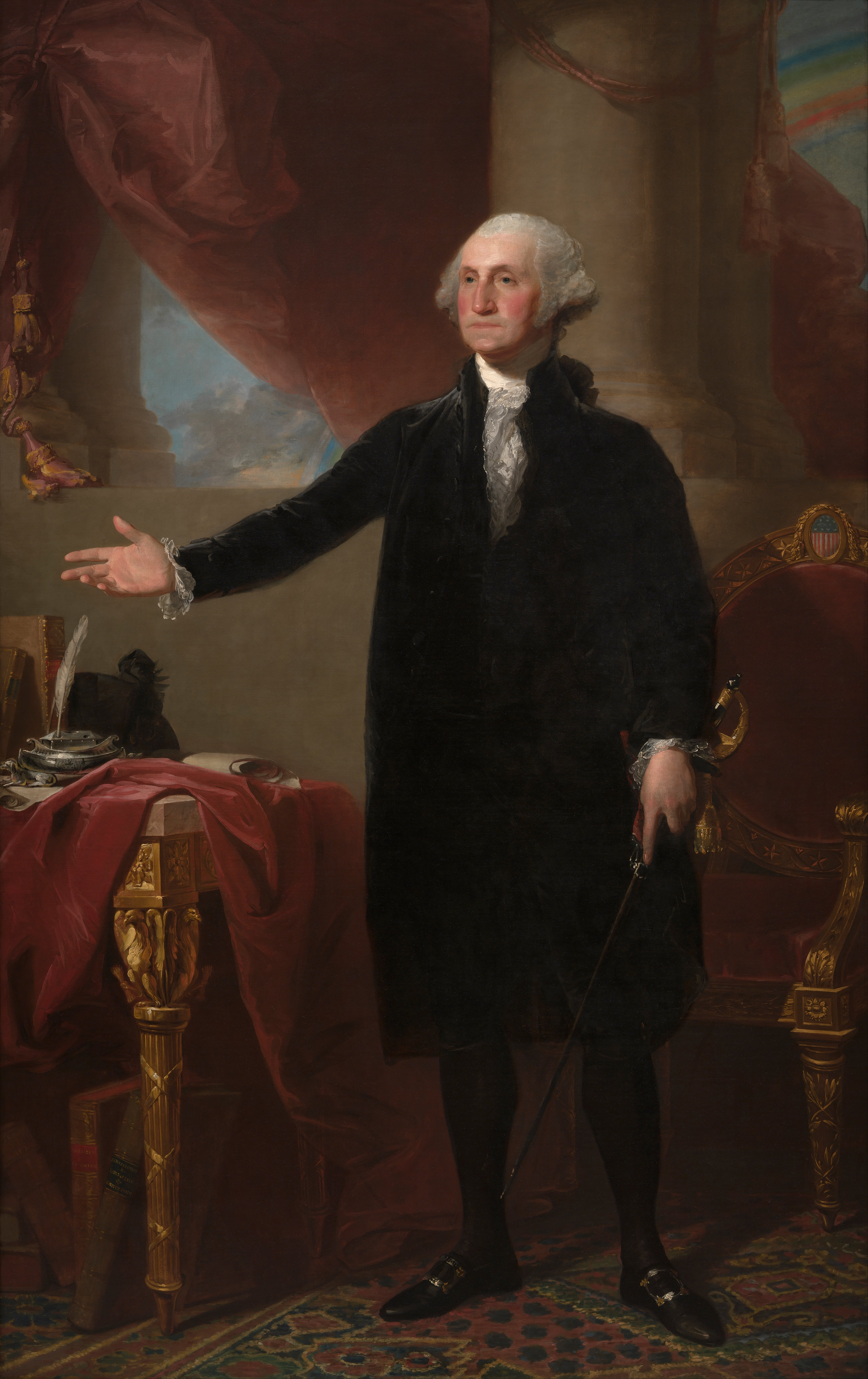
George Washington, the first president of the United States, set the precedent for an executive head of state in republican systems of government.

A presidential system (sometimes also congressional system) is a form of government in which a head of government (usually titled "president") heads an executive branch that derives its authority and legitimacy from a source that is separate from the legislative branch. The system was popularized by its inclusion in the Constitution of the United States.

=== Single-party states ===
In China, under the current country's constitution, the Chinese president is a largely ceremonial office with limited power. However, since 1993, as a matter of convention, the presidency has been held simultaneously by the general secretary of the Chinese Communist Party, the top leader in the one party system. The presidency is officially regarded as an institution of the state rather than an administrative post; theoretically, the president serves at the pleasure of the National People's Congress, the legislature, and is not legally vested to take executive action on its own prerogative. (Note: It is listed as such in the current Constitution; it is thus equivalent to organs such as the State Council, rather than to offices such as that of the Premier.) Mao Zedong, the Chairman of the Chinese Communist Party, rejected that the president of China functioned as China's head of state, arguing instead that the major differences between the Soviet system and the Chinese was that the presidency acted as a representative of the state's collective leadership.

=== Categorisation ===
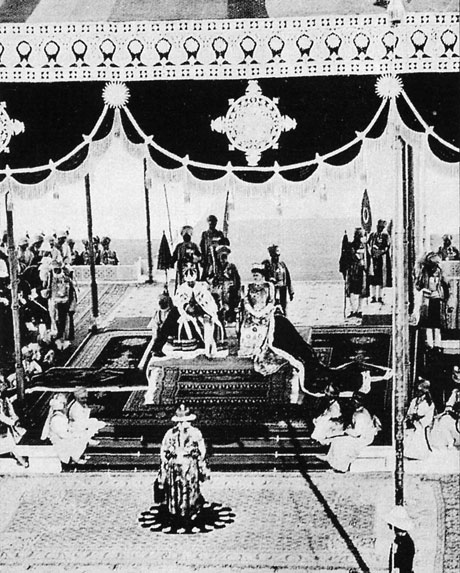
George V, Emperor of India, and Empress Mary at the Delhi Durbar, 1911

Constitutional change in Liechtenstein in 2003 gave its head of state, the Reigning Prince, constitutional powers that included a veto over legislation and power to dismiss the head of government and cabinet.

== Roles ==
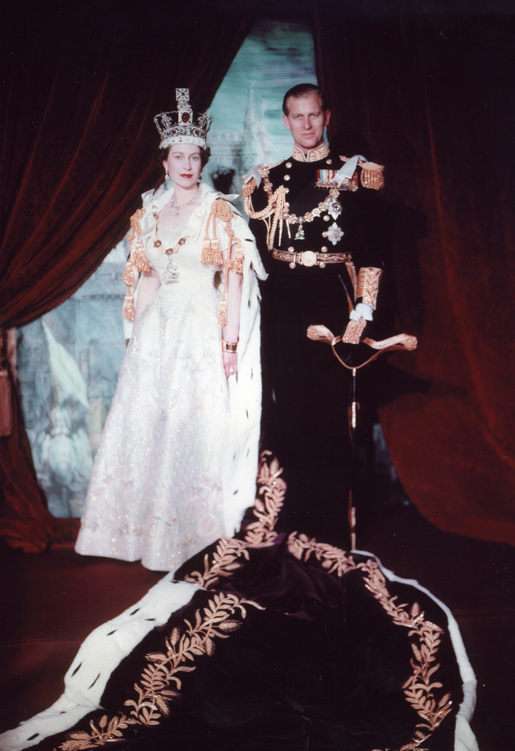
Coronation ceremony: Queen Elizabeth II and the Duke of Edinburgh in her coronation portrait on 2 June 1953.

=== Symbolic role ===
One of the most important roles of the modern head of state is being a living national symbol of the state; in hereditary monarchies this extends to the monarch being a symbol of the unbroken continuity of the state. For instance, the Canadian monarch is described by the government as being the personification of the Canadian state and is described by the Department of Canadian Heritage as the "personal symbol of allegiance, unity and authority for all Canadians".

The Olympic Charter (rule 55.3) of the International Olympic Committee states that the Olympic summer and winter games shall be opened by the head of state of the host nation, by uttering a single formulaic phrase as determined by the charter.

=== Executive role ===
In the majority of states, whether republics or monarchies, executive authority is vested, at least notionally, in the head of state. In presidential systems the head of state is the actual, de facto chief executive officer. Under parliamentary systems the executive authority is exercised by the head of state, but in practice is done so on the advice of the cabinet of ministers. This produces such terms as "Her Majesty's Government" and "His Excellency's Government." Examples of parliamentary systems in which the head of state is notional chief executive include Australia, Austria, Canada, Denmark, India, Italy, Norway, Spain and the United Kingdom.

==== Appointment of senior officials ====
In presidential systems, such as that of the United States, appointments are nominated by the president's sole discretion, but this nomination is often subject to confirmation by the legislature; and specifically in the US, the Senate has to approve senior executive branch and judicial appointments by a simple majority vote.

The head of state may also dismiss office-holders. There are many variants on how this can be done. For example, members of the Irish Cabinet are dismissed by the president on the advice of the taoiseach; in other instances, the head of state may be able to dismiss an office holder unilaterally; other heads of state, or their representatives, have the theoretical power to dismiss any office-holder, while it is exceptionally rarely used. In France, while the president cannot force the prime minister to tender the resignation of the government, he can, in practice, request it if the prime minister is from his own majority. In presidential systems, the president often has the power to fire ministers at his sole discretion. In the United States, the unwritten convention calls for the heads of the executive departments to resign on their own initiative when called to do so.

==== Diplomatic role ====
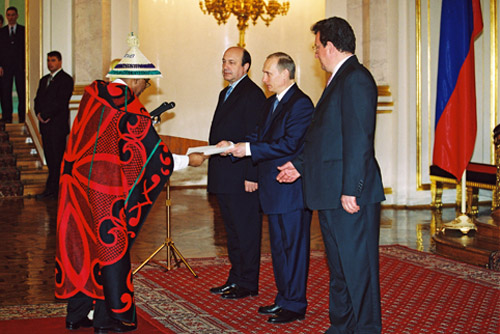
Tekiso Hati, ambassador of the Kingdom of Lesotho, presenting his credentials to Russian president Vladimir Putin

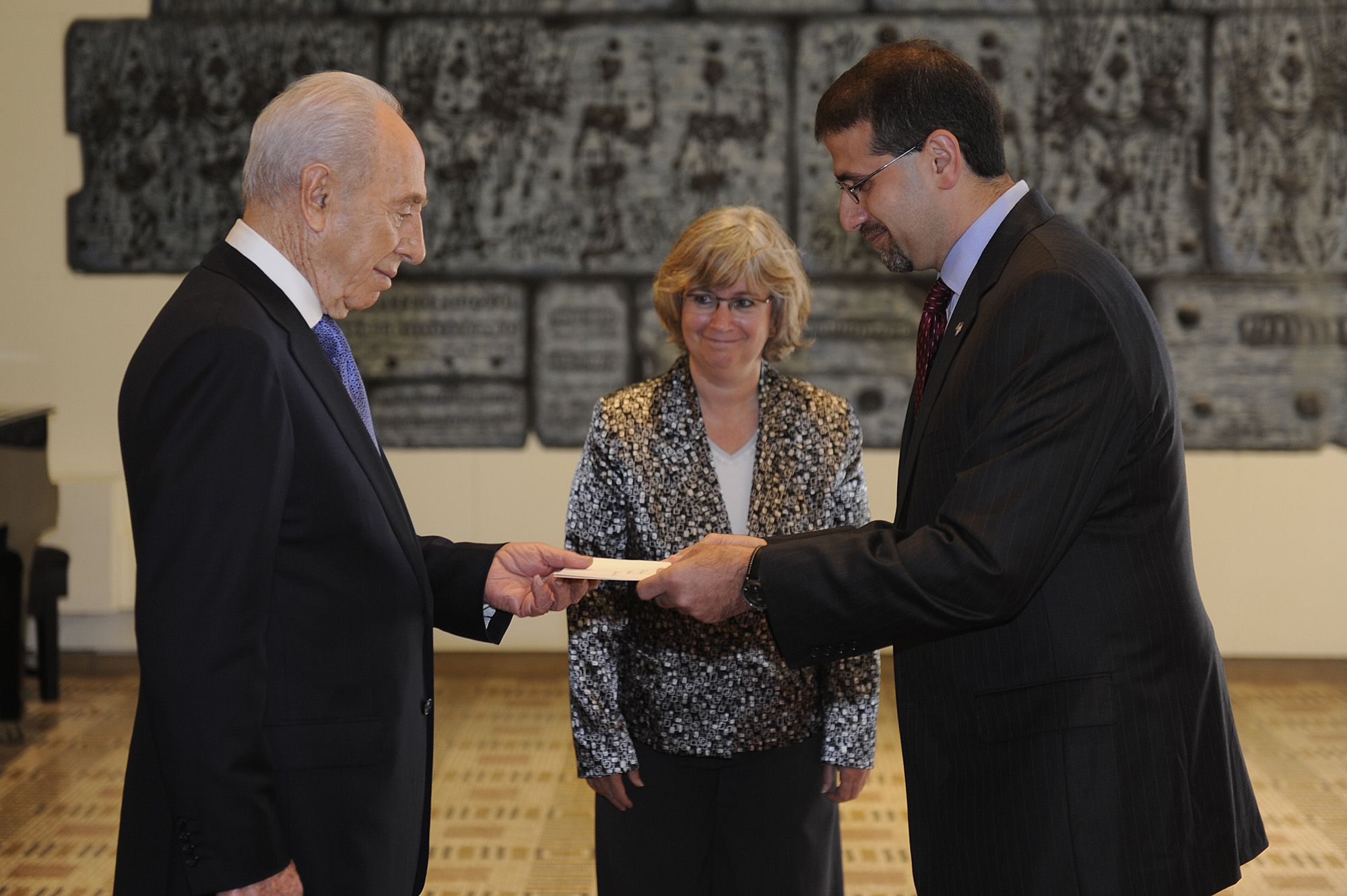
Daniel B. Shapiro, U.S. ambassador to Israel, presents his credentials to Israeli president Shimon Peres on 3 August 2011.

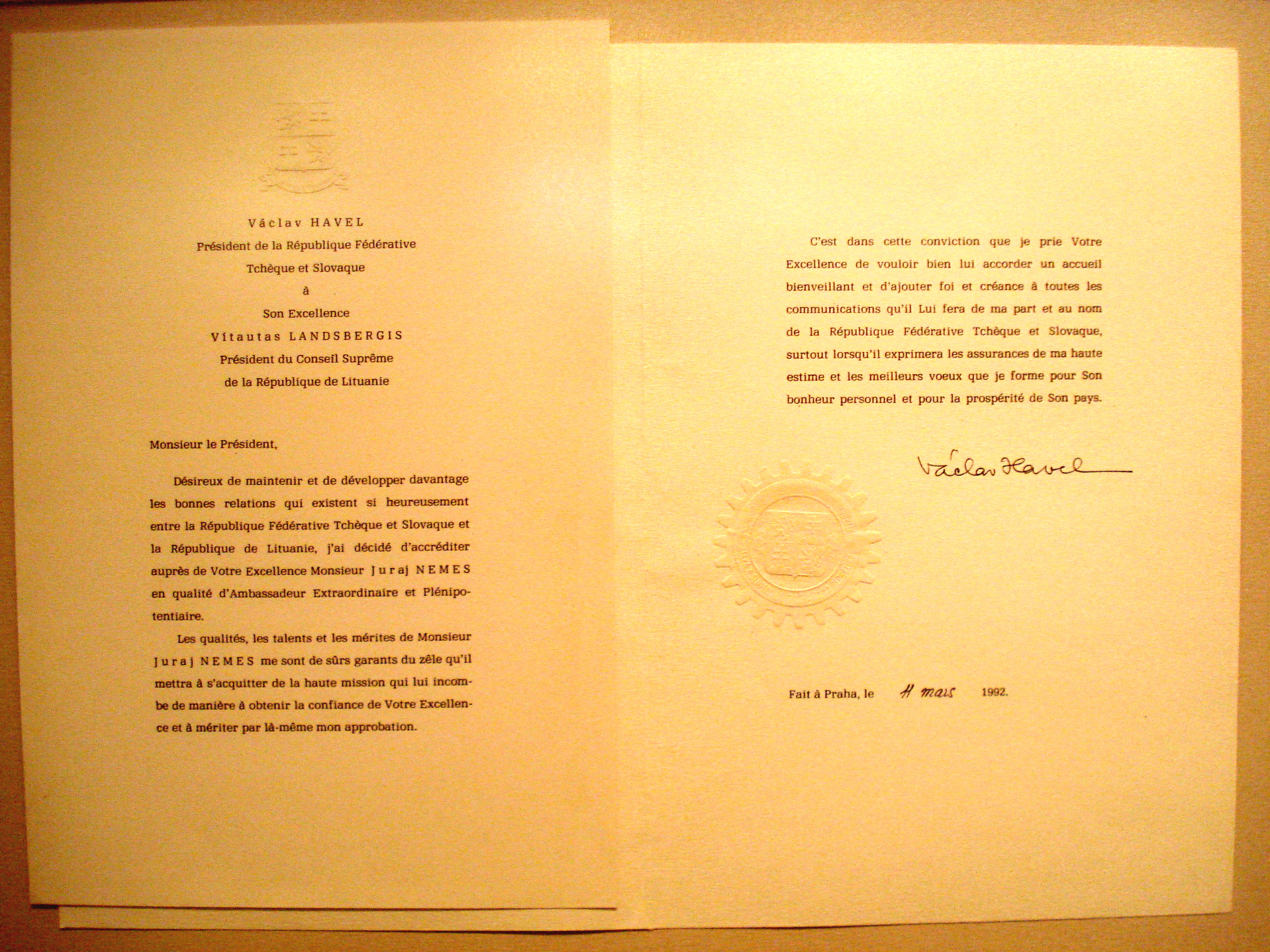
A 1992 letter of credence, written in French, for the Czechoslovak Ambassador to Lithuania, signed by the president of Czechoslovakia and addressed to his Lithuanian counterpart

Although many constitutions, particularly from the 19th century and earlier, make no explicit mention of a head of state in the generic sense of several present day international treaties, the officeholders corresponding to this position are recognised as such by other countries. In a monarchy, the monarch is generally understood to be the head of state. The Vienna Convention on Diplomatic Relations, which codified longstanding custom, operates under the presumption that the head of a diplomatic mission (i.e. ambassador or nuncio) of the sending state is accredited to the head of state of the receiving state. The head of state accredits (i.e. formally validates) their country's ambassadors (or rarer equivalent diplomatic mission chiefs, such as high commissioner or papal nuncio) through sending formal a letter of credence (and a Letter of Recall at the end of a tenure) to other heads of state and, conversely, receives the letters of their foreign counterparts. Without that accreditation, the chief of the diplomatic mission cannot take up their role and receive the highest diplomatic status. The role of a head of state in this regard, is codified in the Vienna Convention on Diplomatic Relations from 1961, which (as of 2017) 191 sovereign states has ratified.

However, there are provisions in the Vienna Convention that a diplomatic agent of lesser rank, such as a chargé d'affaires, is accredited to the minister of foreign affairs (or equivalent).

The head of state is often designated the high contracting party in international treaties on behalf of the state; signs them either personally or has them signed in his/her name by ministers (government members or diplomats); subsequent ratification, when necessary, may rest with the legislature. The treaties constituting the European Union and the European Communities are noteworthy contemporary cases of multilateral treaties cast in this traditional format, as are the accession agreements of new member states. However, rather than being invariably concluded between two heads of state, it has become common that bilateral treaties are in present times cast in an intergovernmental format, e.g., between the Government of X and the Government of Y, rather than between His Majesty the King of X and His Excellency the President of Y.

In Canada, these head of state powers belong to the monarch as part of the royal prerogative, but the Governor General has been permitted to exercise them since 1947 and has done so since the 1970s.

==== Military role ====
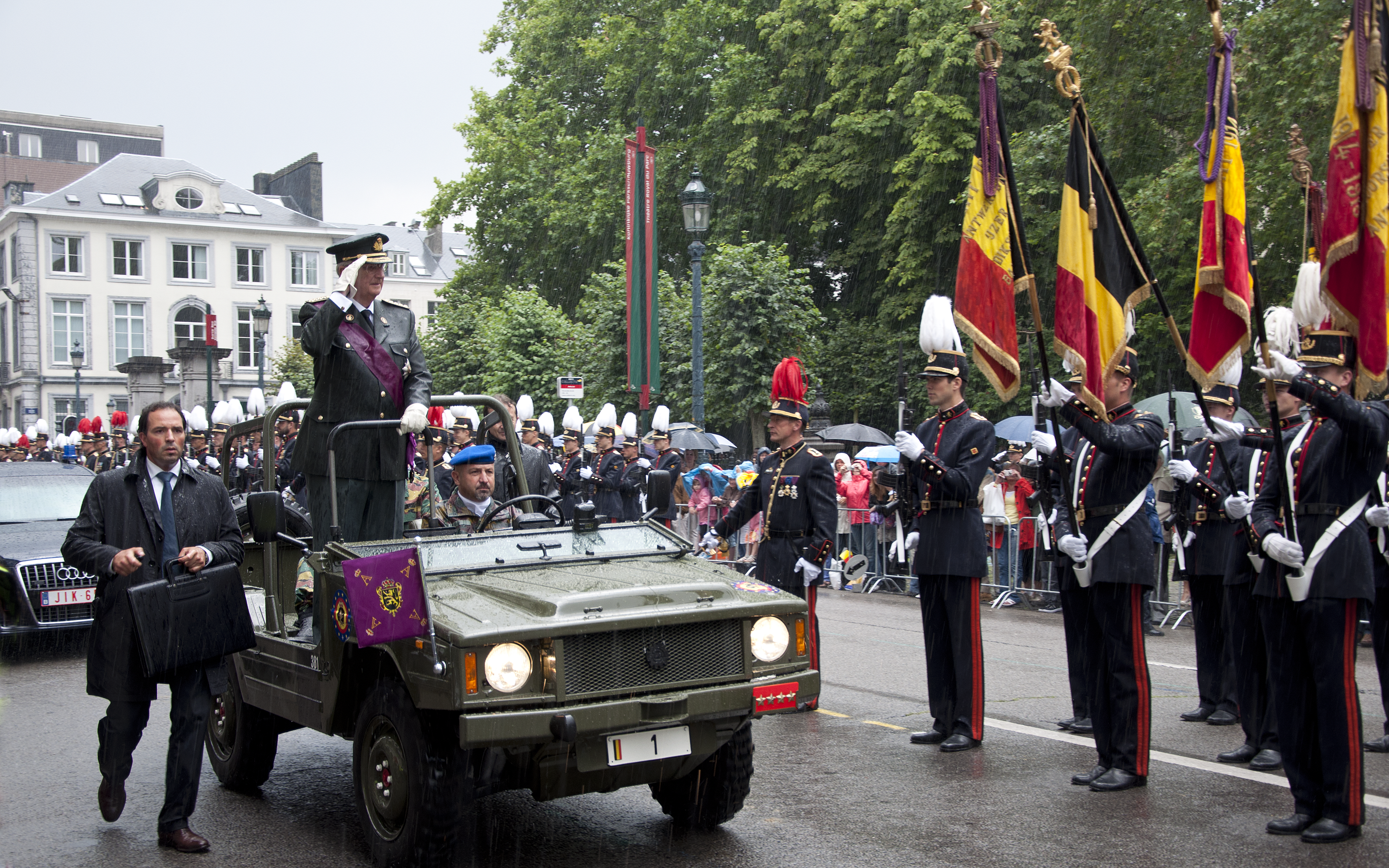
Albert II, King of the Belgians inspecting troops on Belgium's national day in 2011

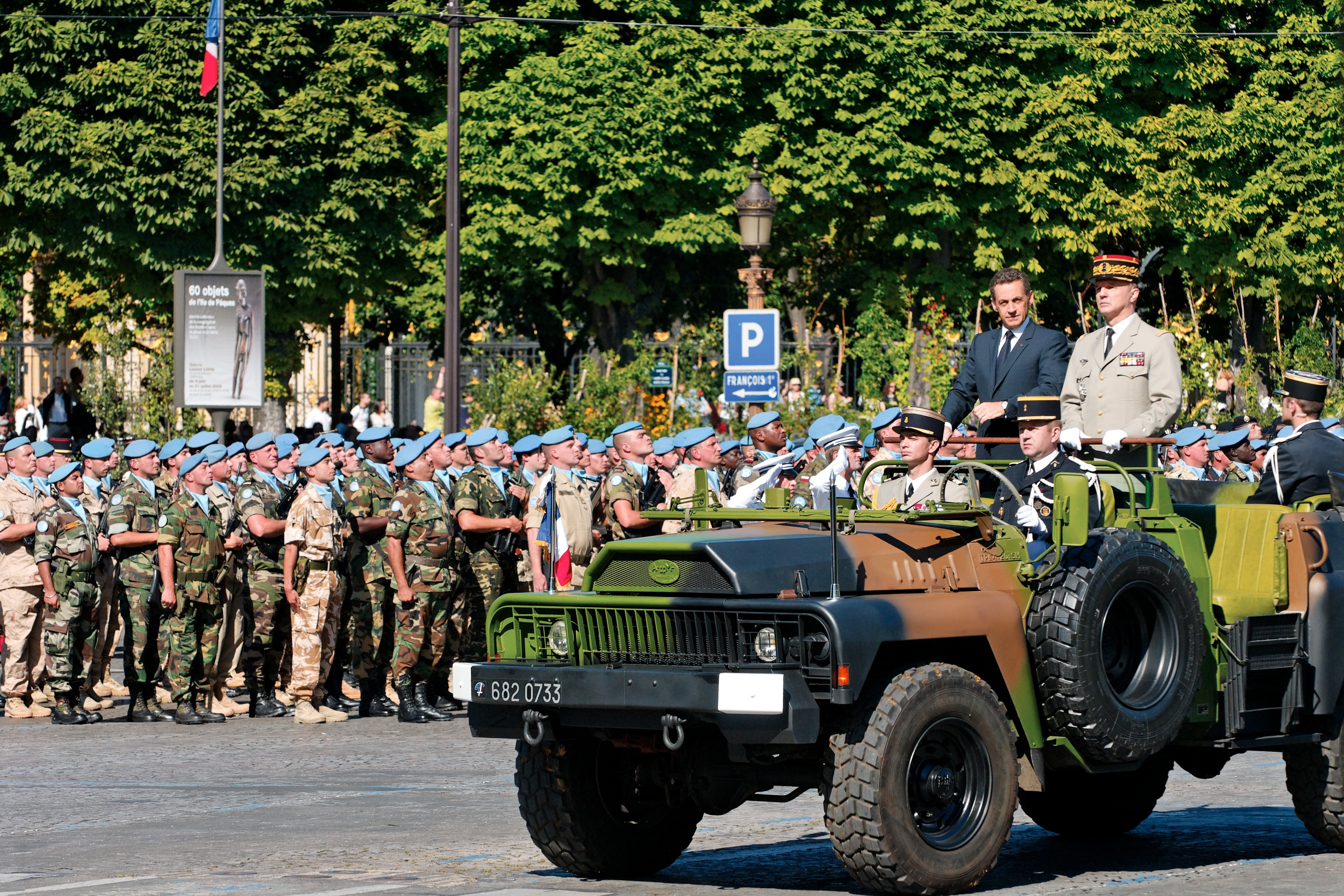
Nicolas Sarkozy, President of France and General Jean-Louis Georgelin, Chief of the Defence Staff, reviewing troops during the 2008 Bastille Day military parade on the Champs-Élysées in Paris

A head of state is often, by virtue of holding the highest executive powers, explicitly designated as the commander-in-chief of that nation's armed forces, holding the highest office in all military chains of command.

Some countries with a parliamentary system designate officials other than the head of state with command-in-chief powers.

- In Germany, the Basic Law for the Federal Republic vests this authority in the Minister of Defence in normal peacetime (article 65a), and that command authority is transferred to the federal chancellor when a State of Defence is invoked (article 115b): something which has never happened so far.
- In Israel, the applicable basic law states that the ultimate authority over the Israel Defense Forces rests with the Government of Israel as a collective body. The authority of the Government is exercised by the minister of defence on behalf of the Government, and subordinate to the minister is the chief of general staff who holds the highest level of command within the military.

The armed forces of the Communist states are under the absolute control of the Communist party.

- In China, the command-in-chief of the People's Liberation Army is the Chairman of the Central Military Commission, but not the president of China, however, in practice, these offices are held by the same person, who is also General Secretary of the Chinese Communist Party.

=== Summoning and dissolving the legislature ===
A head of state is often empowered to summon and dissolve the country's legislature. In most parliamentary systems, this is often done on the advice of the head of government.

=== Other prerogatives ===
==== Reserve powers ====
In a parliamentary or semi-presidential system of government, a reserve power, also known as discretionary power, is a power that may be exercised by the head of state (or their representative) without the approval of another branch or part of the government. Unlike in a presidential system of government, the head of state (or their representative) is generally constrained by the cabinet or the legislature in a parliamentary system, and most reserve powers are usable only in certain limited circumstances.

==== Right of pardon ====
A pardon is a government decision to allow a person to be relieved of some or all of the legal consequences resulting from a criminal conviction. A pardon may be granted before or after conviction for the crime, depending on the laws of the jurisdiction.

Pardons can be viewed as a tool to overcome miscarriage of justice, allowing a grant of freedom to someone who is believed to be wrongly convicted or subjected to an excessive penalty. The second-best theory of pardons views pardons as second-best to fair justice. Pardons can be granted in many countries when individuals are deemed to have demonstrated that they have "paid their debt to society", or are otherwise considered to be deserving of them. In some jurisdictions of some nations, accepting a pardon may implicitly constitute an admission of guilt; the offer is refused in some cases. Cases of wrongful conviction are in recent times more often dealt with by appeal rather than by pardon; however, a pardon is sometimes offered when innocence is undisputed in order to avoid the costs that are associated with a retrial. Clemency plays a critical role when capital punishment exists in a jurisdiction.

Pardons can also be a source of controversy, such as when granted in what appears to be a political favor. The arbitrariness and limited political accountability of pardons have been criticized.

== Official title ==
In a republic, the head of state nowadays usually bears the title of President, but some have or have had other titles. Titles commonly used by monarchs are King/Queen or Emperor/Empress, but also many others: e.g., Grand Duke, Prince, Emir and Sultan.

In certain cases a special style is needed to accommodate imperfect statehood, e.g., the title Sadr-i-Riyasat was used in Kashmir after its accession to India, and the Palestine Liberation Organization leader, Yasser Arafat, was styled the first "President of the Palestinian National Authority" in 1994. In 2008, the same office was restyled as "President of the State of Palestine".

== Historical European perspectives ==
In medieval Catholic Europe, it was universally accepted that the Pope ranked first among all rulers and was followed by the Holy Roman Emperor. The Pope also had the sole right to determine the precedence of all others. This principle was first challenged by a Protestant ruler, Gustavus Adolphus of Sweden and was later maintained by his country at the Congress of Westphalia. Great Britain would later claim a break of the old principle for the Quadruple Alliance in 1718. (Note: On the occasion of a royal marriage in 1760, the premier of Portugal, the Marquis of Pombal, tried to maintain that the host, the King of Portugal, should as a crowned head have the sovereign right to determine the precedence of how ambassadors (apart from the papal nuncio and the imperial ambassador) would rank, based on the date of their credentials. The pragmatic suggestions of Pombal was not successful, and as the pretensions among the great powers were so deep-rooted, it would take the Napoleonic Wars for the great powers to have a fresh look at the issue.) However, it was not until the 1815 Congress of Vienna, when it was decided (due to the abolition of the Holy Roman Empire in 1806 and the weak position of France and other catholic states to assert themselves) and remains so to this day, that all sovereign states are treated as equals, whether monarchies or republics. On occasions when multiple heads of state or their representatives meet, precedence is by the host usually determined in alphabetical order (in whatever language the host determines, although French has for much of the 19th and 20th centuries been the lingua franca of diplomacy) or by date of accession. Contemporary international law on precedence, built upon the universally admitted principles since 1815, derives from the Vienna Convention on Diplomatic Relations (in particular, articles 13, 16.1 and Appendix iii).

European writers of 16th and 17th centuries

Title page of 1550 Italian edition of Machiavelli's The Prince

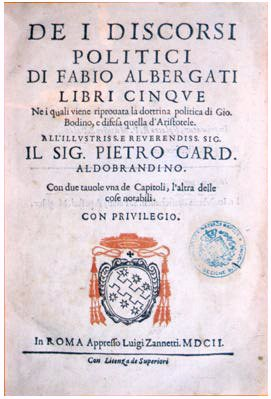
Bodin named on title page of Discorsi politici (1602) by Fabio Albergati who compared Bodin's political theories unfavourably with those of Aristotle

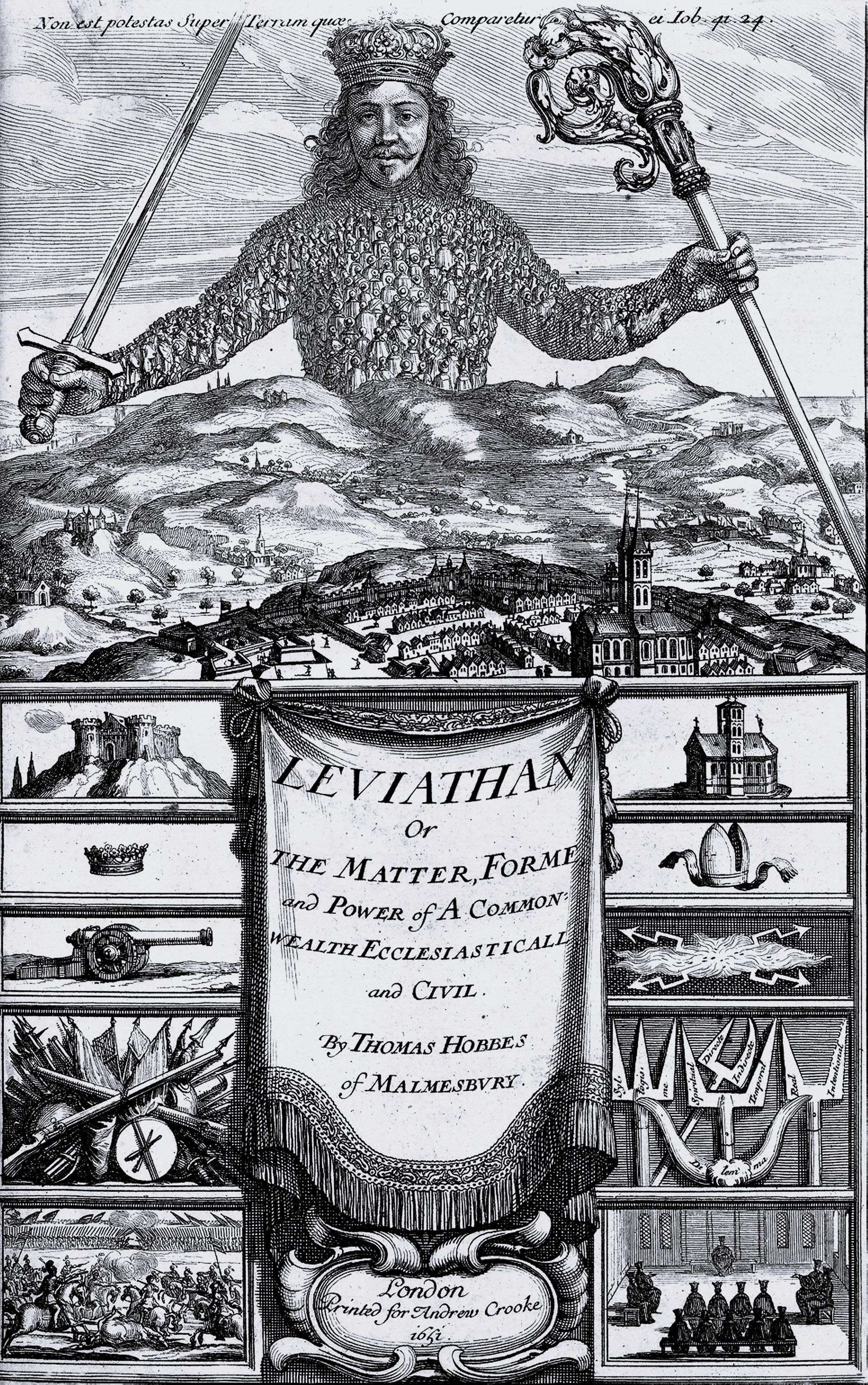
Frontispiece of Thomas Hobbes' Leviathan (1651)

Thomas Hobbes in his Leviathan (1651) used the term Sovereign. In Europe the role of a monarchs has gradually transitioned from that of a sovereign ruler—in the sense of Divine Right of Kings as articulated by Jean Bodin, Absolutism and the "L'etat c'est moi"—to that of a constitutional monarch; parallel with the conceptual evolution of sovereignty from merely the personal rule of a single person, to Westphalian sovereignty (Peace of Westphalia ending both the Thirty Years' War & Eighty Years' War) and popular sovereignty as in consent of the governed; as shown in the Glorious Revolution of 1688 in England & Scotland, the French Revolution in 1789, and the German Revolution of 1918–1919. The monarchies who survived through this era were the ones who were willing to subject themselves to constitutional limitations.

== Interim and exceptional cases ==
In exceptional situations, such as war, occupation, revolution or a coup d'état, constitutional institutions, including the symbolically crucial head of state, may be reduced to a figurehead or be suspended in favour of an emergency office (such as the original Roman dictator) or eliminated by a new "provisionary" regime, such as a collective of the junta type, or removed by an occupying force, such as a military governor (an early example being the Spartan Harmost).

== Shared head of multiple states ==
In early modern Europe, a single person was often monarch simultaneously of separate states. A composite monarchy is a retrospective label for those cases where the states were governed entirely separately. Of contemporary terms, a personal union had less government co-ordination than a real union. One of the two co-princes of Andorra is the president of France.

Such arrangements are not to be confused with supranational entities which are not states and are not defined by a common monarchy but may (or not) have a symbolic, essentially protocollary, titled highest office, e.g., Head of the Commonwealth (held by the British monarch, but not legally reserved for it) or 'Head of the Arab Union' (14 February – 14 July 1958, held by the King of Iraq, during its short-lived Hashemite federation with Jordan).

=== Commonwealth realms ===
Charles III, who currently serves as head of state separately in the United Kingdom and 14 other Commonwealth realms.

The Commonwealth realms share a monarch, currently Charles III. In the realms other than the United Kingdom, a governor-general (governor general in Canada) is appointed by the sovereign, usually on the advice of the relevant prime minister (although sometimes it is based on the result of a vote in the relevant parliament, which is the case for Papua New Guinea and the Solomon Islands), as a representative and to exercise almost all the royal prerogative according to established constitutional authority. Governors-general are frequently treated as heads of state on state and official visits; at the United Nations, they are accorded the status of head of state in addition to the sovereign.

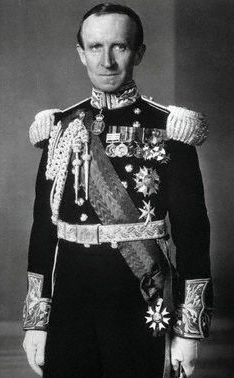
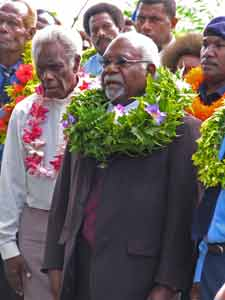
The Lord Tweedsmuir (left) was Governor General of Canada from 1935 to 1940;
Sir Paulias Matane (right) was Governor-General of Papua New Guinea from 2004 to 2010.

An example of a governor-general departing from constitutional convention by acting unilaterally (that is, without direction from ministers, parliament, or the monarch) occurred in 1926, when Canada's governor general refused the head of government's formal advice requesting a dissolution of parliament and a general election. In a letter informing the monarch after the event, the Governor General said: "I have to await the verdict of history to prove my having adopted a wrong course, and this I do with an easy conscience that, right or wrong, I have acted in the interests of Canada and implicated no one else in my decision."

Another example occurred when, in the 1975 Australian constitutional crisis, the governor-general unexpectedly dismissed the prime minister in order to break a stalemate between the House of Representatives and Senate over money bills. The governor-general issued a public statement saying he felt it was the only solution consistent with the constitution, his oath of office, and his responsibilities, authority, and duty as governor-general. A letter from the queen's private secretary at the time, Martin Charteris, confirmed that the only person competent to commission an Australian prime minister was the governor-general and it would not be proper for the monarch to personally intervene in matters that the Constitution Act so clearly places within the governor-general's jurisdiction.

Other Commonwealth realms that are now constituted with a governor-general as the viceregal representative of Charles III are: Antigua and Barbuda, the Bahamas, Belize, Grenada, Jamaica, New Zealand, Saint Kitts and Nevis, Saint Lucia, and Saint Vincent and the Grenadines.

== Appointment ==
=== By constitution ===
Individual heads of state may acquire their position by virtue of a constitution, typically as a transitional measure as part of establishing the new form of government that the constitution decrees: For example, transitional provision 1 of the Constitution of Italy states that once the constitution enters into force, the Provisional Head of State would automatically become President of Italy under it. An extreme example of this approach is Seychelles, where the 1976 Independence Constitution's Article 31 stated that James Mancham would be the first President of Seychelles by name, rather than by the fact he was the prime minister of colonial Seychelles immediately before independence.

=== By hereditary succession ===
Absolute cognatic primogeniture diagram. Legend: Grey: incumbent; Square: male; Circle: female; Black: deceased; Diagonal: cannot be displaced

Primogeniture, in which the eldest child of the monarch is first in line to become monarch, is the most common system in hereditary monarchy. The order of succession is usually affected by rules on gender. Historically "agnatic primogeniture" or "patrilineal primogeniture" was favoured, that is inheritance according to seniority of birth among the sons of a monarch or head of family, with sons and their male issue inheriting before brothers and their male issue, to the total exclusion of females and descendants through females from succession. This complete exclusion of females from dynastic succession is commonly referred to as application of the Salic law. Another variation on agnatic primogeniture was the so-called semi-Salic law, or "agnatic-cognatic primogeniture", which allowed women to succeed only at the extinction of all the male descendants in the male line of the particular legislator.

Sometimes, however, primogeniture can operate through the female line. In some systems a female may rule as monarch only when the male line dating back to a common ancestor is exhausted. In 1980, Sweden, by rewriting its 1810 Act of Succession, became the first monarchy to declare equal (full cognatic) primogeniture, meaning that the eldest child of the monarch, whether female or male, ascends to the throne.

=== By election ===
Countries where the electoral system directly elects their head of state, by type: Two-round system (majority voting) First-past-the-post (plurality voting) Instant-runoff voting (ranked-choice majority voting)

Election usually is the constitutional way to choose the head of state of a republic, and some monarchies: either direct election or indirect election by members of the legislature or another elected body (such as the Electoral College in the United States). Two-round systems or instant-runoff voting can reduce votes that could be wasted with the first-past-the-post system.

=== By foreign imposition ===
A foreign power can establishing a branch of their own dynasty, or one friendly to their interests. This was often the outcome of the wars fought between the Roman Empire and the Parthian Empire over control of Armenia, a vital buffer state between the two realms. The Roman–Parthian War of 58–63 ended with a compromise: a Parthian prince of the Arsacid line would henceforth sit on the Armenian throne, but his nomination had to be approved by the Roman emperor.

== Former heads of state ==
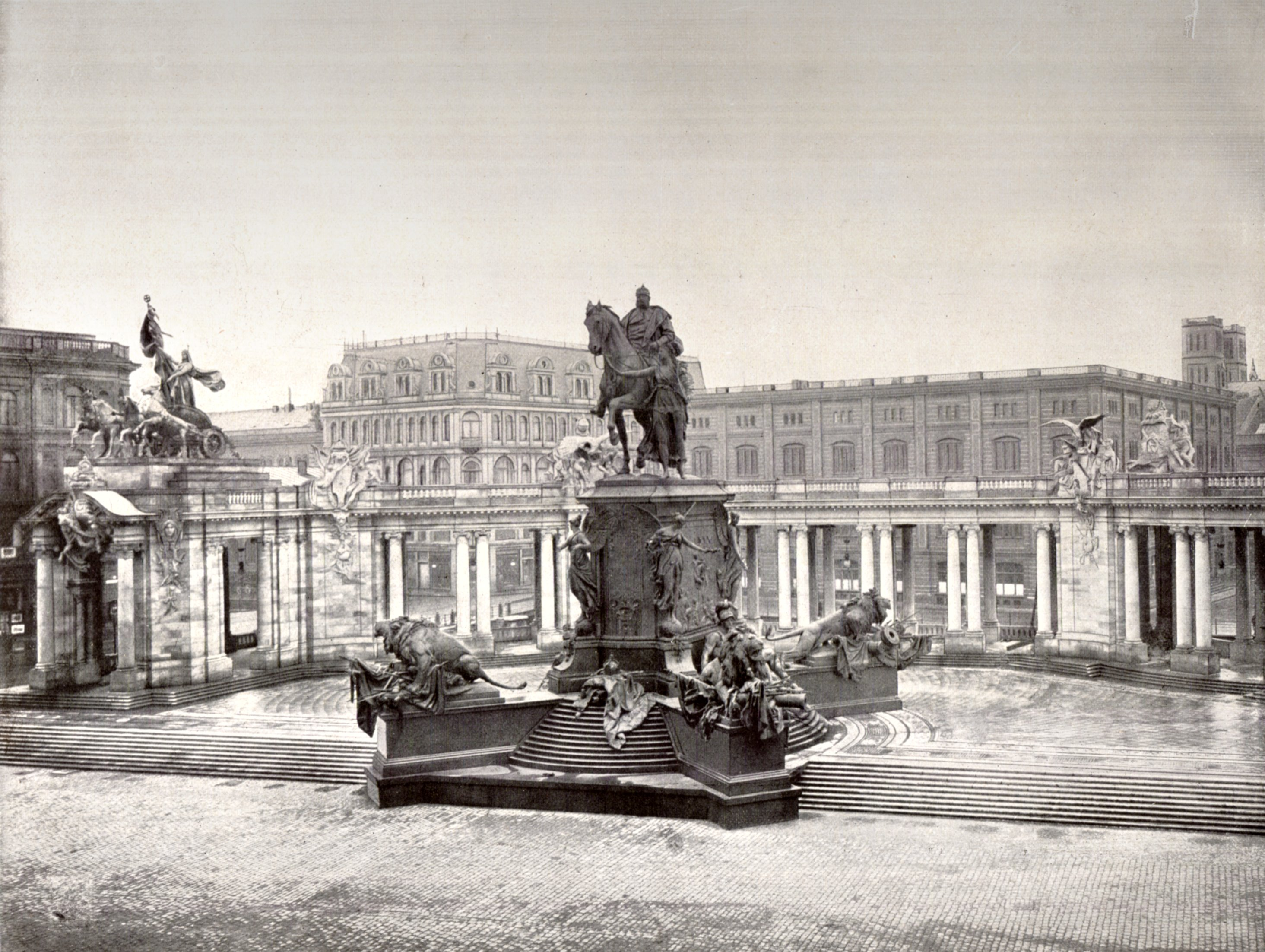
The National Monument to Emperor Wilhelm I in Berlin, Germany, dedicated 1897, nearly 10 years after his death. The monument was destroyed by the communist government in 1950.

Effigies, memorials and monuments of former heads of state can be designed to represent the history or aspirations of a state or its people, such as the equestrian bronze sculpture of Kaiser Wilhelm I, first Emperor of a unified Germany erected in Berlin at the end of the nineteenth century; or the Victoria Memorial erected in front of Buckingham Palace London, commemorating Queen Victoria and her reign (1837–1901), and unveiled in 1911 by her grandson, King George V; or the monument, placed in front of the Victoria Memorial Hall, Kolkata (Calcutta) (1921), commemorating Queen Victoria's reign as Empress of India from 1876. Another, twentieth century, example is the Mount Rushmore National Memorial, a group sculpture constructed (1927–1941) on a conspicuous skyline in the Black Hills of South Dakota (40th state of the Union, 1889), in the midwestern United States, representing the territorial expansion of the United States in the first 130 years from its founding, which is promoted as the "Shrine of Democracy".

=== Personal influence or privileges ===
By tradition, deposed monarchs who have not freely abdicated continue to use their monarchical titles as a lifetime courtesy. Hence, even after Constantine II ceased to be King of the Hellenes, it was still common to refer to him and his family as if he was still on the throne, as many European royal courts and households have done in guest lists at royal weddings, as in Sweden in 2010, Britain in 2011 and Luxembourg in 2012. The current Hellenic Republic opposes former members of the Greek royal family being referred to by their former titles or bearing a surname indicating royal status, and has enacted legislation which hinders acquisition of Greek citizenship unless those terms are met. In 2013, Constantine II brought this issue, along with property ownership issues, before the European Court of Human Rights for alleged violations of the European Convention on Human Rights, but lost with respect to the name issue.

== See also ==
- Air transports of heads of state and government
- Directorial system
- Head of government
- President
- Strongman (politics)

=== Lists ===
- List of current heads of state and government
- List of elected and appointed female heads of state and government
- List of heads of state by diplomatic precedence
- List of longest reigning current monarchs
- List of state leaders by year
- Records of heads of state

== Bibliography ==
- Foakes, Joanne (2014). The Position of Heads of State and Senior Officials in International Law. Oxford International Law Library. Oxford, UK: Oxford University Press. ISBN 978-0-19-964028-7.
- Markwell, Donald (2016). Constitutional Conventions and the Headship of State: Australian Experience. Connor Court. ISBN 9781925501155.
- Roberts, Sir Ivor, ed. (2009). Satow's Diplomatic Practice (Sixth ed.). Oxford: Oxford University Press. ISBN 978-0-19-969355-9.
- Robertson, David (2002). A Dictionary of Modern Politics: Third Edition. London: Europa Publications. p. 221. ISBN 1-85743-093-X. "head of state."
- Watts, Sir Arthur (2010). "Heads of State". In Wolfrum, Rüdiger (ed.). Max Planck Encyclopedia of Public International Law. Oxford International Public Law. Oxford University Press.
- Zhang, Runhua (2014). The Constitutional and Legal Development of the Chinese Presidency The Emperors' New Clothes?. Lexington Books. ISBN 9780739189900.
