= Ernst-Ulrich Petersmann =

German law professor (born 1945)

Ernst-Ulrich Petersmann (born 26 August 1945 in Hamburg) is a German law professor who is regarded as a chief architect of the General Agreement on Tariffs and Trade and its successor, the World Trade Organization.

== Education and early career ==
Petersmann studied law and economics at the Universities of Berlin, Heidelberg, Freiburg, Geneva, and the London School of Economics. He obtained his doctor juris utriusque from Heidelberg University in 1976, with a thesis on international investment law and economic integration, supervised by Judge Hermann Mosler of the International Court of Justice. He was admitted to the German bar in 1977.

His habilitation, supervised by Judge Rudolf Bernhardt of the European Court of Human Rights, focused on the constitutional dimensions of international economic law and was later published under the title "Constitutional Functions and Constitutional Problems of International Economic Law."

== Academic career ==
Petersmann taught constitutional law at the Universities of Hamburg and Heidelberg and served as Professor of International and European Law at the Universities of St. Gallen, Fribourg, Geneva, and the Geneva Graduate Institute. From 2001 to 2011, he was Professor of International and European Law at the European University Institute (EUI) in Florence, where he also served as the head of the Law Department from 2006 to 2009 and worked at the Robert Schuman Centre for Advanced Studies.

As a visiting professor, he has taught at institutions such as the Hague Academy of International Law, the EUI Academy of European Law, the Xiamen Academy of International Law, and universities across Europe, North and Latin America, Asia, and Africa.

In parallel to his academic work, Petersmann served as legal counsel to the German government between 1978 and 1980, representing Germany in European and United Nations institutions.

Petersmann was legal counsellor for the General Agreement on Tariffs and Trade and worked as legal consultant for the World Trade Organization from 1981 to 2025. He was among a small group of lawyers at the General Agreement on Tariffs and Trade secretariat in Geneva who helped reform the organization in the 1980s and transform it into the World Trade Organization. University of Washington law professor Dongsheng Zang has called Petersmann, Jan Tumlir, an economics professor at the Graduate Institute of International and Development Studies in Geneva, and US law professor John Jackson "the GATT's major intellectual architects."

== Scholarly work ==
Petersmann has (co)authored 35 books and contributed to more than 370 academic works in English, German, French, and other languages. His scholarship centers on international economic law, European integration, constitutional pluralism, and human rights. Notable publications include Constitutional Functions and Constitutional Problems of International Economic Law (1991), International Economic Law in the 21st Century: Constitutional Pluralism and Multilevel Governance of Interdependent Public Goods (2012), Transforming World Trade and Investment Law for Sustainable Development (2022). He has advocated for the integration of human rights norms into international economic law. He has developed the concept of multilevel constitutionalism, arguing that national constitutions alone are insufficient to address global public goods such as environmental protection, health, and economic stability.

Petersmann has been an active member of several academic and professional associations. He served as rapporteur (1993–1999) and later chairman (1999–2014) of the International Trade Law Committee of the International Law Association. He has served on editorial boards of journals, including the Journal of International Economic Law, the Asian Journal of WTO & International Health Law and Policy, and advisory boards for several yearbooks and international law publications.

He has also contributed to academic assessments for research councils and funding institutions in Europe, including the European Research Council, the Swiss National Science Foundation, and the German Fritz Thyssen Stiftung.

== Personal life ==
Prof. Petersmann is married and has eight children. He resides in Florence, Italy, where he continues his academic work as an emeritus professor.

== Selected writings ==
- Economic Integration Law and Investment Legislation of Developing Countries. Basic Problems, Comparative Legal and Multidisciplinary Aspects. Baden-Baden 1974, ISBN 3-7890-0120-1
- Constitutional functions and constitutional problems of international economic law. International and domestic foreign trade law and foreign trade policy in the United States, the European Community and Switzerland. Fribourg 1991, ISBN 2-8271-0533-0
- International and European trade and environmental law after the Uruguay Round. London 1995, ISBN 90-411-0857-2
- The GATT/WTO dispute settlement system. International law, international organizations, and dispute settlement. London 1997, ISBN 90-411-0933-1
- Petersmann, Ernst-Ulrich; Pollack, Mark A. (2003-12-04). Transatlantic Economic Disputes. Oxford University Press. ISBN 978-0-19-926172-7.
- Petersmann, Ernst-Ulrich (2005-06-09), "WTO Negotiators and Academics Analyse the Doha Development Round of the WTO: Overview and Summary of the Book", Reforming the World Trading SystemLegitimacy, Efficiency, and Democratic Governance, Oxford University Press, pp. 3–36
- Petersmann, Ernst-Ulrich (2019-03-04). Constitutional Functions and Constitutional Problems of International Economic Law (1 ed.). Routledge. doi:10.4324/9780429034268. ISBN 978-0-429-03426-8.
- Petersmann, Ernst Ulrich (2005). Developing countries in the Doha Round: WTO decision-making procedures and negotiations on trade in agriculture and services. Florence: Robert Schuman Centre for Advanced Studies. ISBN 9789290840183.
