= Andreas Zimmermann (legal scholar) =

German academic

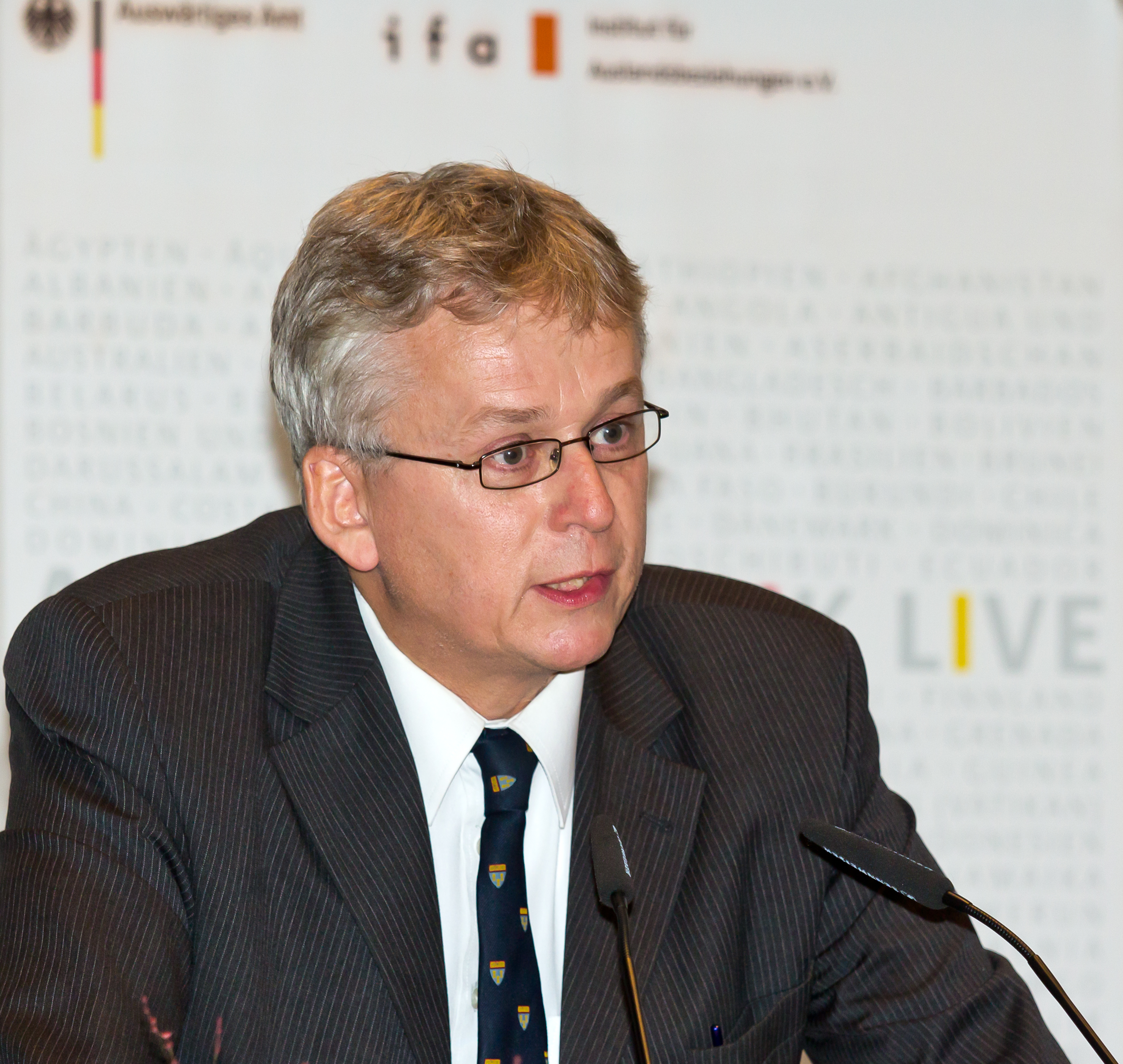
Andreas Zimmermann (2013)

Andreas Zimmermann (born 18 June 1961) is a German legal scholar, Professor of International and European Law at the University of Potsdam. He is also the director of the Potsdam Human Rights Centre. Before his appointment in Potsdam, he was Professor of Public International and European Law, as well as Director of the Walther Schücking Institute for International Law at Kiel University.

== Life ==
After graduating from high school in 1980, he studied law at the University of Tübingen (Germany) and the Université de Droit Aix-Marseille III (France). In 1986, he passed the First State Examination in Law, graduating 1st of his class of 227 students. Following his civil service and a period as an assistant to Hans von Mangoldt, he earned an LL.M. from Harvard Law School in 1989. He then passed the Second State Examination (7th in class of 577) while working part-time as an assistant at the Heidelberg Max Planck Institute for Comparative Public Law and International Law.

He continued his work at the Institute as a research assistant, initially under Helmut Steinberger and later under Jochen Abr. Frowein. There, he submitted his PhD thesis “Das neue Grundrecht auf Asyl” (The new fundamental right to asylum), which was awarded summa cum laude and received the Ruprecht Karls Prize of Heidelberg University. The thesis examines the scope and conditions of the fundamental right to asylum from both constitutional and international law perspective, drawing on an expert opinion prepared by Zimmermann and Frowein for the German Federal Ministry of Justice. In 1999, he completed his Habilitation at the Faculty of Law of the University of Heidelberg with a thesis entitled “Staatennachfolge in völkerrechtliche Verträge” (State Succession in International Law Treaties).

He declined appointments at the University of Hannover and the Geneva Graduate Institute in favour of a position as Professor of Public International and European Law and Director of the Walther Schücking Institute for International Law at Kiel University, where he served from 2001 to 2009. He subsequently accepted a chair in Public Law, International Law and European Law at the University of Potsdam, where he also became Director of the Potsdam Centre for Human Rights.

Andreas Zimmermann is married.

== Academic career and work ==
Zimmermann is co-editor of The Statute of the International Court of Justice – A Commentary (Oxford University Press, 3rd ed. 2019; 4th ed. forthcoming). He is also the co-editor of The 1951 Convention on the Status of Refugees and its 1967 Protocol - A Commentary (Oxford University Press, 2nd ed. 2024). Over the course of his career, Zimmermann has held visiting professorships at the University of Michigan (United States), Copenhagen (Denmark), Tartu (Estonia), Johannesburg (South Africa), Hebrew University (Israel), Birzeit University (Palestine), Sorbonne Abu Dhabi (United Arab Emirates), as well as the Hague Academy of International Law. He has also taught on the United Nations International Law Fellowship Programme.

Zimmermann has extensive practical experience as legal counsel before international and domestic courts, including the International Court of Justice, the Iran-United States Claims Tribunal, and the German Federal Constitutional Court. He has also served as an ad hoc judge in proceedings before the European Court of Human Rights.

As a member of, and legal adviser to, the German delegation he contributed to the negotiations that led to the establishment of the International Criminal Court (1996–1998). He later sat on an expert commission responsible for the drafting of the German Code of Crimes against International Law (1999–2001). He was elected to the United Nations Human Rights Committee in 2018, serving until 2020.

Zimmermann is an arbitrator under the Annex to the Vienna Convention on the Law of Treaties. He is a member of the Permanent Court of Arbitration, the Advisory Board on International Law at the German Federal Foreign Office and the German Red Cross Committee on International Humanitarian Law. Since 2025, Zimmermann has served as the elected President of the OSCE Court of Conciliation and Arbitration.
