= How America Gets Away With Murder =

2005 non-fiction book by Michael Mandel

- Author: Michael Mandel
- Language: English
- Subjects: International Law
- Genre: non-fiction
- Publisher: Pluto Press
- Publication date: 2005
- ISBN: 9780745321516

How America Gets Away With Murder is a 2005 book by Canadian legal scholar Michael Mandel about the legality of United States and NATO military interventions in Yugoslavia, Iraq, and Afghanistan.

== Publication ==
How America Gets Away With Murder: Illegal Wars, Collateral Damage and Crimes Against Humanity is a 2005 book by Canadian legal professor Michael Mandel, published in 2005 by Pluto Press.

== Synopsis ==
The first part of the book includes chapters on United States' and NATO's roles in the 1999 bombing of Yugoslavia, the 2001 invasion of Afghanistan, and the 2003 invasion of Iraq, each of which the author describes as criminal. The author summarizes the legal justifications for the wars, including United Nations Security Council approvals, self-defense, and humanitarian explanations and discounts them all.

The second part of the book focuses on the International Criminal Tribunal for the former Yugoslavia, which he describes as NATO propaganda rather than a justice-seeking court. Mandel describes numerous links between the creation of the tribunal and NATO, before writing about the trial of Slobodan Milošević. He states that the court declined to investigate if NATO forces had committed war crimes during the bombing of Yugoslavia.

The last part of the book focused on the International Criminal Court, the Nuremberg Trials, the Tokyo Trials, the UK's House of Lords examination of the cases against Augusto Pinochet, and Belgium's War Crimes Law.

== Critical reception ==
Chris L. S. Coryn of Western Michigan University described the book as "well-researched and well-documented". M. Michelle Gallant (Ph.D) at University of Manitoba's faculty of law describes the book as "caustic" as well as "well-documented, incisive, if at time overly harsh."

Legal author Björn Elberling described the book as a "forceful frontal assault on the international criminal law process" in the German Yearbook on International Law in 2005. He also noted the author's polemic rhetoric and inaccuracies with regards to implications that NATO leaders are guilty of murder in Yugoslavian bombings; Elberling stated that armed forces killing civilians in war are (in theory) prosecuted as graver crimes than murder under International Law. Elberling also states that Mandel was wrong to write that no Nazi's remained in prison past the 1950's, citing the example of Rudolf Hess who remained in prison until his death in 1987. Elberling further accuses Mandel of inaccuracy around a statement that the United Nations Security Council can defer International Criminal Court investigations indefinitely, stating that is an over simplification of the rules. Elberling emphasises that the main arguments in the book are strong but "would have been even stronger - and probably had more chance of convincing supporters of the international criminal law movement - without such avoidable mistakes." Elberling emphasises "the important contribution the book makes to the general debate far outweighs any such inaccuracies. Michael Mandel provides convincing arguments against the current state of the international criminal law that nobody engaged in the field or concerned with "universal (criminal) justice" can afford to ignore."

== See also ==
- Legitimacy of the NATO bombing of Yugoslavia
- Legality of the Iraq War
- Opposition to the War in Afghanistan (2001–2021)
