= Court of Conciliation and Arbitration =

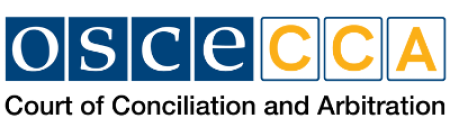

Court overview
- Jurisdiction: Organization for Security and Co-operation in Europe
- Headquarters: Geneva, Switzerland
- Court executives: Andreas Zimmermann, President of the Court; Erkki Kourula, Vice-President of the Court
- Website: www.osce.org/cca

Map
- Court of Conciliation and Arbitration (Europe)

The Court of Conciliation and Arbitration (CCA) is an institution of the Organization for Security and Cooperation in Europe (OSCE), which provides "mechanism for the peaceful settlement of disputes between States". The Court, originally established in 1992 under the Ministerial Council's decision on Peaceful Settlement of Disputes: "Convention on Conciliation and Arbitration within the CSCE" adopted in Stockholm, Sweden.

== Mandate ==
Based in Geneva, Switzerland, CCA has the mandate for facilitating disputes between the 57 participating States of the OSCE. An OSCE participating State – party to the convention – has the mandate to initiate the mechanism independently and address a dispute with one or more other participating States. After the proceedings, a conciliation commission will deliver a report with suggestions and recommendations for the parties of dispute. This is followed by period of 30 days, within which parties involved in the dispute can determine their acceptance of the recommendations. In case the consensus is not reached within this timeframe, and if the parties have previously consented to arbitration, an ad hoc arbitral tribunal can be established, whose decision holds legal weight over the Parties. Additionally, arbitration proceedings can be commenced through mutual agreement among the concerned States parties.

== Presidents of the OSCE Court of Conciliation and Arbitration ==
Presidents of the OSCE Court of Conciliation and Arbitration
Photo	Name and Surname	OSCE participating State	Mandate
	Robert Badinter	France	1992–2013
	Christian Tomuschat	Germany	2013–2019
	Emmanuel Decaux	France	2019–2025

== See also ==
- Organization for Security and Co-operation in Europe
- Organization for Security and Co-operation in Europe statistics
- OSCE Minsk Group
- Office for Democratic Institutions and Human Rights
- Armenia–OSCE relations
- Azerbaijan–OSCE relations
- International organisations in Europe
