= Eva-Maria Kieninger =

German legal scholar and professor

Eva-Maria Kieninger (born 1964 in Stuttgart, Baden-Württemberg) is a German legal scholar and professor at the University of Würzburg.

== Life ==
Kieninger studied law at the University of Passau from 1983 to 1989, where she passed her First State Examination in Law. After her subsequent legal clerkship and the Second State Examination in 1992, she worked as a research assistant to Jürgen Basedow at the University of Augsburg. Kieninger obtained her doctorate of laws in 1995 under his supervision, and accompanied him as an assistant when he went to the Free University of Berlin.

From 1997 to 1998 she worked as a research fellow at the Max Planck Institute for Comparative and International Private Law in Hamburg. Funded by a scholarship from the DFG, she habilitated at the University of Hamburg in July 2001, obtaining the venia legendi for the subjects of civil law, commercial law and corporate law, comparative law and international private and procedural law.

Since 2001, she has held the Chair of German and European Private Law as well as Private International Law at the University of Würzburg, having declined a call from the University of Jena. From 2014 to 2016 Kieninger was Dean of the Faculty of Law of the University of Würzburg, and from 2011 to 2015 she was also a member of the University Council of the University of Passau. In 2018, she was elected a full member of the Bavarian Academy of Sciences and Humanities.

== Awards and memberships ==
- Since 2019 Full member of the Academia Europaea
- Since 2018 Full Member of the Bavarian Academy of Sciences and Humanities
- 2013 to 2017 and since 2022 member of the Council of the Deutsche Gesellschaft für Internationales Recht (German Society for International Law)
- 2017–2023 Deputy Chair of the Deutsche Gesellschaft für Internationales Recht (German Society for International Law)
- 2019–2022 Co-founder of the European Association of Private International Law (EAPIL); Member of Scientific Council
- Since 2022 Member, Research Award Selection Committee, Alexander von Humboldt Foundation
- Since 2009 Member, International Academy of Comparative Law (Académie Internationale de Droit Comparé, AIDC/IACL)
- Since 2006 Member of the International Academy of Commercial and Consumer Law
- Since 2003 Member of the German Council for Private International Law
- 1999–2001 Habilitation scholarship of the German Research Foundation (DFG)

== Publications (selection) ==
Kieninger’s research focuses on international private and procedural law, comparative law and European private law. Most recently, she worked intensively on liability issues related to supply chains and climate change.

=== Editorships ===
- Since 2012 co-editor of the European Property Law Journal (EPLJ) ISSN 2190-8273
- Since 2007 co-editor of the Zeitschrift für Europäisches Privatrecht (ZEuP) ISSN 0943-3929
- Since 2015 co-editor of the Zeitschrift für die gesamte Privatrechtswissenschaft (ZfPW) ISSN 2363-4960

=== Further publications ===
- Mobiliarsicherheiten im Europäischen Binnenmarkt – Zum Einfluß der Warenverkehrsfreiheit auf das nationale und internationale Sachenrecht der Mitgliedstaaten. Nomos, Baden-Baden 1996, ISBN 978-3-7890-4430-4 (Doctoral thesis).
- Wettbewerb der Privatrechtsordnungen im Europäischen Binnenmarkt – Studien zur Privatrechtskoordinierung in der Europäischen Union auf den Gebieten des Gesellschafts- und Vertragsrechts. Mohr Siebeck, Tübingen 2002, ISBN 978-3-16-147799-7 (Habilitation thesis).
