= Armin von Bogdandy =

German legal scholar (born 1960)

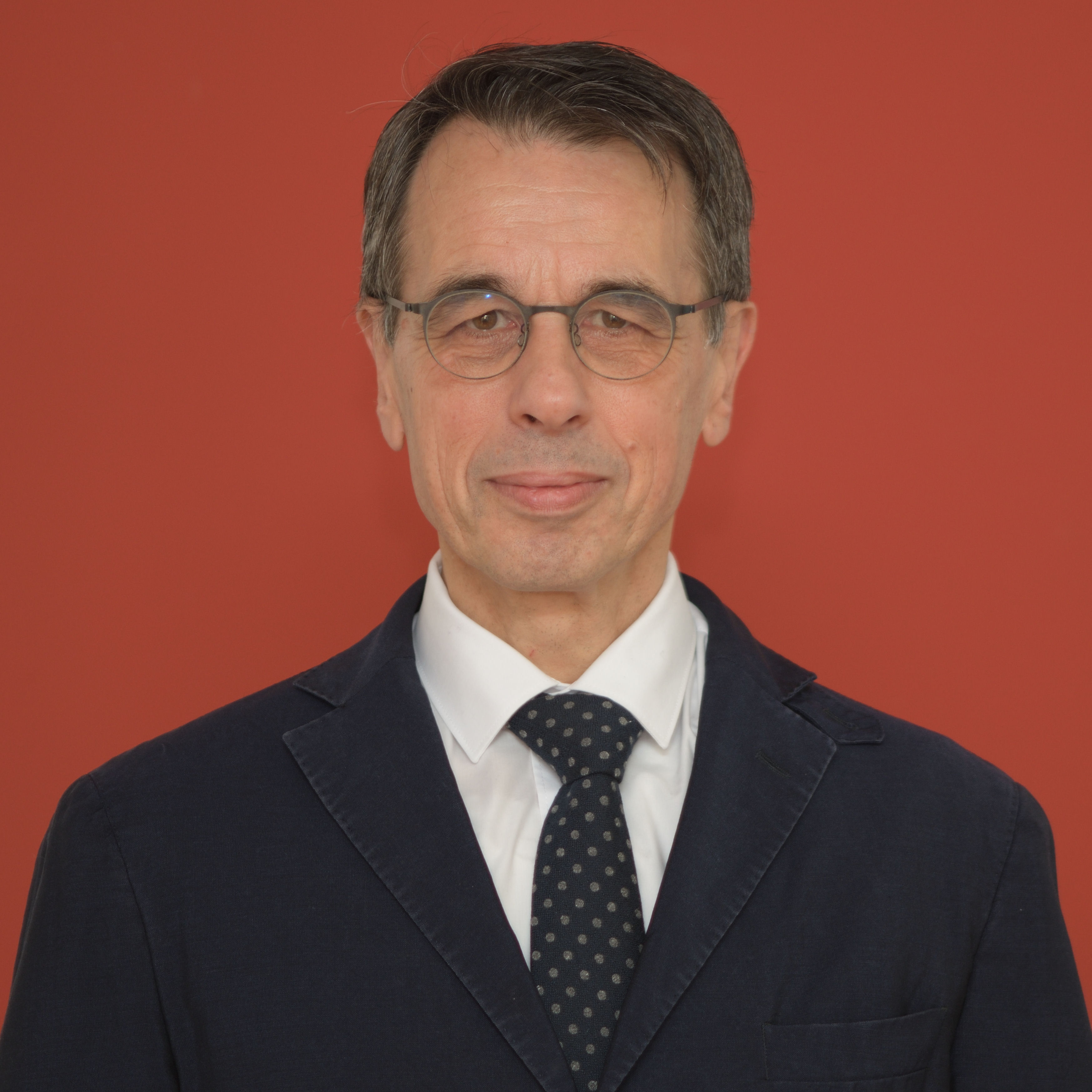
- Born: 5 June 1960 (age 66); Oberhausen, West Germany (now Germany)
- Title: Director at the Max Planck Institute for Comparative Public Law and International Law and Professor for Public Law at the Goethe University Frankfurt.
- Parent: Ludwig von Bogdandy
- Awards: Leibniz Prize (2014)

Academic background
- Education: University of Freiburg (LLB, PhD); Freie Universität Berlin (Habilitation)
- Thesis: Hegels Theorie des Gesetzes (1989)

Academic work
- Discipline: Public international law, European law
- Institutions: Goethe University Frankfurt; Max Planck Institute for Comparative Public Law and International Law
- Website: Max Planck Institute

Armin von Bogdandy (born 5 June 1960 in Oberhausen) is a German legal scholar. He is director of the Max Planck Institute for Comparative Public Law and International Law in Heidelberg and Professor for Public Law, European Law, and International and Economic Law at the Goethe University Frankfurt. Armin von Bogdandy's research centers on the structural changes affecting public law, be they theoretical, doctrinal, or practical.

== Early life and education ==
A member of the noble Hungarian Bogdándy family, Armin von Bogdandy is a son of the metallurgist and industrial executive Ludwig von Bogdandy, and a grandson of the Hungarian physical chemist Stefan von Bogdándy. In 1978, he finished high school in Dinslaken and started to study law (1979–1984) and philosophy (1980–1987) at the University of Freiburg and at the Freie Universität Berlin before completing his doctoral thesis (1984–1986) on Hegel's Theory of the Statute; his PhD was supported by a scholarship of the Land Baden-Württemberg. In 1989, Armin von Bogdandy passed his second state exam in Berlin. From 1993 to 1995, he received a scholarship from the Deutsche Forschungsgemeinschaft (DFG) and qualified as a professor at the Freie Universität Berlin (1996) with a work on governmental lawmaking, supervised by Albrecht Randelzhofer.

== Career ==
Armin von Bogdandy obtained a professorial chair in Public Law, European Law, and International and Economic Law as well as Philosophy of Law at the University in Frankfurt/Main in 1997. In September 2000 he declined the offer for directorship at the Centre of European Law and Politics (ZERP). From 2001 until 2014, Armin von Bogdandy was a judge – and, from 2006 onwards, the president – at the OECD Nuclear Energy Tribunal in Paris.

He became one of the two directors of the Max Planck Institute for Comparative Public Law and International Law in Heidelberg in October 2002. In May 2003, he became professor at the Faculty of Law of the Heidelberg University, but left the University in 2009.

From 2005 until 2008, he was a member of the German Council of Science and Humanities (Wissenschaftsrat) before becoming a member of the Scientific Committee of the European Union Agency for Fundamental Rights (2008–2013). From 2010 until 2015, he was a Senior Emile Noël Fellow at New York University. From 2013 until 2019, he was Partner Investigator at the “Normative Orders” cluster of excellence in Frankfurt/Main.

== Research ==
The main focus of his research are the current changes in the structure of Public Law which is divided into three areas at his department at the Max Planck Institute for Comparative Public Law and International Law: The Law of European Society, the concept of International Public Authority and the Ius Constitutionale en América Latina (ICCAL).

His research regarding the Law of European Society concerns European law in a broad sense, including the law of the European Union as well as regional instruments of Public International Law such as the European Convention on Human Rights. His research object is the observation of the process of European unification from a legal perspective by enabling a specific European method of Comparative Law as well as the legal understanding of the emergence and democratization of European society.

In the field of International Public Authority he is studying the increasing power of international institutions which are acting in public interest, but whose legitimacy might be questionable. He is developing a theory of International Public Law which can be seen as advancement of the field of Public International Law governing the exercise of international public Power.

The ICCAL-project pursues a regional approach to transformative constitutionally in Latin America. It is based on the concrete experience of untenable conditions of systemic character. Object of this work is the political and social change caused by a concerted strengthening of Human Rights, Democracy and the Rule of Law.

== Awards ==
- Prize of the Berlin-Brandenburg Academy of Sciences and Humanities for outstanding scientific achievements in the field of legal and economic foundations, 2008
- Gottfried Wilhelm Leibniz Prize, 2014
- Premio Internacional de Investigación „Héctor Fix Zamudio” Universidad Nacional Autónoma de México, 2015
- “Mazo” (gavel) of the Inter-American Court of Human Rights, 2015
- Honorary doctor of the Universidad Nacional de Tucumán, 2017
- Honorary doctor of the Universidad Nacional de Córdoba, 2020
- Honorary doctor and professor of the Eötvös-Loránd-University of Budapest, 2020
- Honorary doctor of the Universidad San Pablo-Tucumán, 2022
- Honorary doctor of the University of Bucharest, 2022

== Selected publications ==
=== Monographies ===
- Dissertation: Armin von Bogdandy (1989), Hegels Theorie des Gesetzes (in German), Freiburg (Breisgau): Alber, ISBN 978-3-495-47683-3
- Habilitation: Armin von Bogdandy (2000), "Gubernative Rechtsetzung: eine Neubestimmung der Rechtsetzung und des Regierungssystems unter dem Grundgesetz in der Perspektive gemeineuropäischer Dogmatik", Jus Publicum (in German), Tübingen: Mohr Siebeck, ISBN 978-3-16-147171-1
- Armin von Bogdandy/Ingo Venzke, In whose name? A public law theory of international adjudication. Oxford University Press, New York, 2016, ISBN 978-0-19-871746-1.
- Armin von Bogdandy. Por un derecho común para América Latina. Cómo fortalecer las democracias frágiles y desiguales. (Leonardo García Jaramillo, academic editor and translator). Buenos Aires, Siglo XXI, 2020, ISBN 978-987-801-021-2.
- Armin von Bogdandy (2024), "The Emergence of European Society through Public Law: A Hegelian and Anti-Schmittian Approach", Armin von Bogdandy Strukturwandel des öffentlichen Rechts, Oxford: Oxford University Press, doi:10.1093/oso/9780198909347.001.0001, hdl:1814/76726, ISBN 978-0-19-890934-7

=== Articles ===
- Armin von Bogdandy, National legal scholarship in the European legal area – A manifesto. In: International Journal of Constitutional Law 10 (2012), 614–626 (academic.oup.com).
- Armin von Bogdandy: The Idea of European Public Law Today. In: von Bogdandy/Huber/Cassese (eds.): . Volume 1. Oxford University Press, 2017, ISBN 978-0-19-872640-1, S. 1–29 (ssrn.com).
- Armin von Bogdandy, Ius Constitutionale Commune en América Latina: una mirada a un constitucionalismo transformador. In: Revista Derecho del Estado 34 (2015), 3–50 (revistas.uexternado.edu.co).
- Armin von Bogdandy/René Urueña: International Transformative Constitutionalism in Latin America. In: American Journal of International Law. 2020, 403–442.
- Armin von Bogdandy/Matthias Goldmann: From Public International to International Public Law: Translating World Public Opinion into International Public Authority. European Journal of International Law, 2017, 115–145 (ejil.org).

=== Editorships ===
- Armin von Bogdandy/Jürgen Bast (eds.): Principles of European Constitutional Law. 2nd ed. Hart – C.H. Beck – Nomos, 2009, ISBN 978-1-84731-784-1.
- Ongoing publication of new volumes: Armin von Bogdandy/Peter Huber et al. (eds.): The Max Planck Handbooks in European Public Law. Oxford University Press, ISBN 978-3-8114-4114-9.
- Armin von Bogdandy u.a. (eds.): Der Staat: Zeitschrift für Staatslehre und Verfassungsgeschichte, deutsches und europäisches öffentliches Recht. Duncker & Humblot.
- Armin von Bogandy/Anne Peters (eds.): Heidelberg Journal of International Law. C.H. Beck.
