= ECFR =

ECFR may refer to:

- Electronic Code of Federal Regulations (e-CFR).
- Enka-Candler Fire & Rescue, a public safety provider near Asheville, North Carolina.
- European Company and Financial Law Review, an academic journal of the Max Planck Institute for Comparative and International Private Law, published by De Gruyter
- European Council for Fatwa and Research, a private foundation composed of Islamic clerics and scholars.
- European Council on Foreign Relations, a pan-European foreign policy think tank.
