= Supranational law =

Law that transcends national boundaries

Supranational law is a form of international law, based on the limitation of the rights of sovereign nations between one another. It is distinguished from public international law, because in supranational law, nations explicitly submit their right to make judicial decisions by treaty to a set of common tribunal. The United Nations Security Council and subordinate organizations, such as the International Court of Justice, are the only globally accepted supranational tribunals.

== American supranational law ==
The Articles of Confederation, formally the Articles of Confederation and Perpetual Union, was the first supranational agreement where 13 sovereign states were unified in a common government, which later became the United States of America. The central government proved too weak to manage the growing economy as the sovereign states incurred national debts and independently managed their national currencies without central coordination. The supranational government was terminated and the sovereign states were united into a unified sovereign nation-state by the United States Constitution in 1785.

== European Union supranational law ==
European Union law was the next example of a supranational legal framework. In the EU, sovereign nations have pooled their authority through a system of courts and political institutions. They have the ability to enforce legal norms against and for member states and citizens, in a way that public international law does not. According to the European Court of Justice (ECJ) in the early case, 26/62, of NW Algemene Transporten Expeditie Onderneming van Gend en Loos v Nederlandse Administratie der Belastingen [1963] ECR 1, (often known as just Van Gend en Loos) it constitutes "a new legal order of international law":

The Community constitutes a new legal order of international law for the benefit of which the states have limited their sovereign rights, albeit within limited fields, and the subjects of which comprise not only member states but also their nationals. Independently of the legislation of member states, community law therefore not only imposes obligations on individuals but is also intended to confer upon them rights which become part of their legal heritage. These rights arise not only where they are expressly granted by the treaty, but also by reason of obligations which the treaty imposes in a clearly defined way upon individuals as well as upon the member states and upon the institutions of the community.

Human rights in the EU, as enforced by the ECJ, are based on the "general principles of EU law" – ascertained by the ECJ on the basis of various sources including national constitutions and traditions – as well as the European Convention on Human Rights (ECHR), and the Charter of Fundamental Rights of the European Union. The status of the Charter was reinforced by the Treaty of Lisbon, which entered into force on 1 December 2009, though the United Kingdom and Poland negotiated a protocol to the treaty which "purports to limit the impact of the Charter in those states".

== See also ==
- European integration
- Constitutional pluralism
- Direct effect of European Union law
- Primacy of European Union law
