= Ludwig von Bogdandy =

- Born: 10 February 1930; Berlin, Germany
- Died: 5 May 1996; Linz, Austria
- Scientific career
- Fields: Metallurgy
- Institutions: Voestalpine (CEO 1988–1992)

Ludwig von Bogdandy (10 February 1930 - 5 May 1996) (Hungarian: Bogdándy Lajos) was a German metallurgist and industrial executive. He was a researcher on iron and steel production, and was CEO of Voestalpine, an international steel based technology and capital goods group based in Linz. He was the honorary Hungarian Consul-General in Linz.

== Family ==
Ludwig von Bogdandy was a son of the Hungarian physical chemist Stefan von Bogdándy, who moved to Berlin in the 1920s, and was the father of the legal scholar Armin von Bogdandy.

== Career ==
He earned a Habilitation at RWTH Aachen University in 1959, and became associate professor at the same university in 1965. In 1985 he was awarded an honorary doctorate in engineering. He was a member of the board of directors of Thyssen Niederrhein and managing director of the Klöckner Works. From 1986 to 1988 he was a member of the board of directors and from 1988 to 1992 chairman of the board of directors and CEO of Voestalpine. From 1990 to 1992 he was a member of the board of directors of Österreichische Industrieholding, which administers the investments of the Republic of Austria in partially or entirely nationalized companies. He was Hungarian Consul-General in Linz from 1993.

He received the Grand Decoration of Honour for Services to the Republic of Austria and was a Knight of Honour of the Order of Saint John. The Ludwig von Bogdandy Award, which is awarded by RWTH Aachen University, is named in his honour.

== Works ==
- Die Reduktion der Eisenerze: wissenschaftliche Grundlagen und technische Durchführung, Stahleisen, Düsseldorf 1967 (with Hans-Jürgen Engell)
- Anwendung der Desoxydationskinetik auf die Herstellung halbberuhigten Stahles, Stahleisen, Düsseldorf 1969
- Aktuelle Entwicklungstendenzen der Phosphorchemie, Westdt. Verlag, Opladen 1986 (with Marianne Baudler)
