= Max Planck Institute for Comparative Public Law and International Law =

German legal research institute

- Abbreviation: MPIL
- Formation: 1924; 102 years ago
- Purpose: Basic research
- Headquarters: Berlin
- Location: Heidelberg, Germany
- Co-Directors: Armin von Bogdandy and Anne Peters
- Parent organization: Max Planck Society
- Staff: approx. 100
- Website: www.mpil.de

The Max Planck Institute for Comparative Public Law and International Law (Max Planck Institute for International Law, MPIL) is a legal research institute located in Heidelberg, Germany. It is operated by the Max Planck Society.

The institute was founded in 1924 and was originally named the Kaiser Wilhelm Institute for Foreign and International Public Law and located in Berlin. It later relocated to Heidelberg and received its current name in 1949. The institute currently employs 69 scientific staff and is led by two co-directors, Armin von Bogdandy (since 2002) and Anne Peters (since 2013). It is seated at Heidelberg University's New Campus.

The institute is one of the most important research institutions in the German-speaking world in the fields of international law, European law, comparative public law, and for the theoretical frameworks of transnational law. It has traditionally performed important advisory functions for parliaments, administrative organs and courts concerned with questions of public international law, comparative public law and European law. In particular, the institute has provided the German Federal Constitutional Court, the German Bundestag and the German Federal Government with information, expert testimony and counsel, representing the Federal Republic of Germany in several high-profile cases.

The institute's directors regularly hold the chairs for international law at the University of Heidelberg Law School. Moreover, the institute's directors traditionally have held outstanding positions in national and international courts and bodies:

- Hermann Mosler, Justice in the European Court of Human Rights (1959–1976); Justice in the International Court of Justice (1976–1985)
- Rudolf Bernhardt, President of the European Court of Human Rights (Justice 1981–1998, President 1992–1998)
- Helmut Steinberger, Justice in the German Federal Constitutional Court (1975–1987), Vice President of the OSCE Court of Conciliation and Arbitration (2001–2008)
- Jochen Frowein, Vice President of the European Commission for Human Rights (1977–1993)
- Rüdiger Wolfrum, President of the International Tribunal for the Law of the Sea (Justice since 1996, President 2005–2008)
- Armin von Bogdandy, President of the European Nuclear Energy Tribunal (Justice since 2001, President since 2006)
- Anne Peters, Member (substitute) of the European Commission for Democracy through Law (Venice Commission) in respect of Germany (since 2011)

Former research assistants include Hans-Peter Kaul, sitting vice president of the International Criminal Court, Juliane Kokott, sitting Advocate General of the European Court of Justice, former Justice in the International Court of Justice Carl-August Fleischhauer, and Georg Nolte, present member of the United Nations International Law Commission.

With 630.000 volumes, the institute's library contains the largest collection for international law, European law, and public law in Europe. Regular publications by the institute include the "Heidelberg Journal for International Law", the "Max Planck Yearbook of United Nations Law"; the "Journal of the History of International Law"; the "Max Planck Encyclopedia of Public International Law"; and the semi-annual bibliography "Public International Law". Guests are involved in the institute's programs, especially symposia, lectures and the weekly meetings of the research staff, as well as various staff-led working groups on specific subject areas.

The institute is part of the network Max Planck Law.

== Directors ==
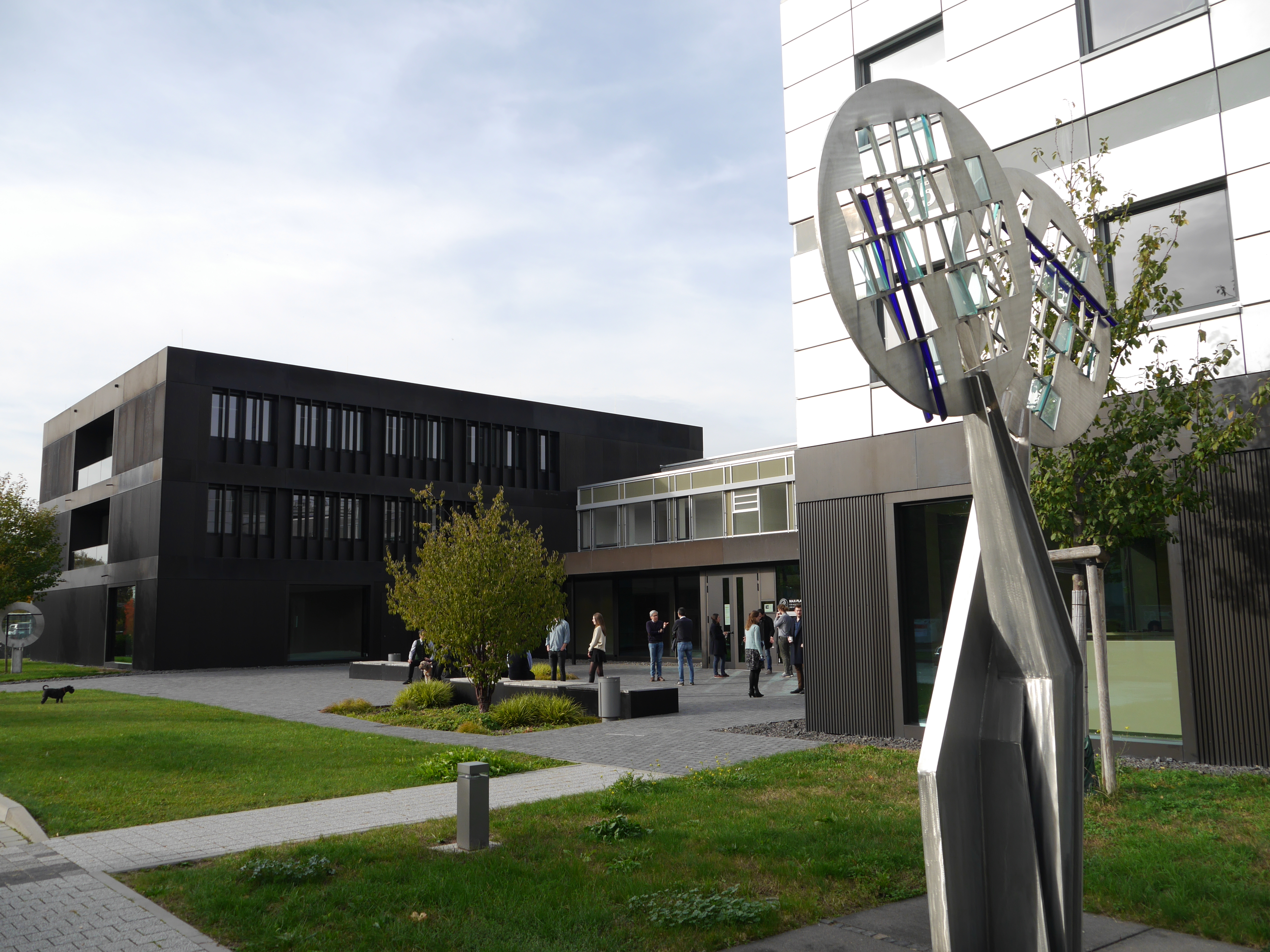
The building of the institute in Heidelberg

- Carl Bilfinger (1950–1954)
- Hermann Mosler (1954–1980)
- Rudolf Bernhardt (1970–1993)
- Karl Doehring (1963–1987)
- Helmut Steinberger (1987–1997)
- Jochen Frowein (1981–2002)
- Rüdiger Wolfrum (1993–2012)
- Armin von Bogdandy (since 2002)
- Anne Peters (since 2013)

== See also ==
- Max Planck Society
- Heidelberg University
- Heidelberg University Faculty of Law
- Max Planck Encyclopedia of Public International Law
- Max Planck Institute for Comparative and International Private Law
