= Heidelberg Journal of International Law =

- Discipline: Public international law, comparative law and European law
- Language: English and German

Publication details
- History: 1929–
- Publisher: C.H. Beck/Max Planck Institute for Comparative Public Law and International Law (Germany)

Standard abbreviations
- ISO 4: Heidelb. J. Int. Law

Indexing
- ISSN: 0044-2348

Links
- Journal homepage

The Heidelberg Journal of International Law (German: Zeitschrift für ausländisches öffentliches Recht und Völkerrecht) is an academic journal in public international law, comparative law and European law. It was established in 1929 and is published by C.H. Beck on behalf of the Max Planck Institute for Comparative Public Law and International Law. It is regarded as one of the world's leading journals in public international law. Originally published in German, it currently publishes articles in both English and German.
