= Michael Mandel (law professor) =

Canadian legal academic (1948–2013)

- Born: May 6, 1948; Toronto, Ontario, Canada
- Died: October 27, 2013 (aged 65)

Academic background
- Education: Osgoode Hall Law School (LL.B.); University of Oxford (B.C.L.)

Michael Mandel (May 6, 1948 – October 27, 2013) was a Canadian legal academic, specializing in criminal law with a particular interest in criminal sentencing and legal theory.

He was the author of the 2005 book How America Gets Away With Murder.

== Education ==
Mandel graduated from Osgoode with his LL.B. and the silver medal. Mandel also had a B.C.L. from Oxford, where he studied under the late renowned legal scholar Ronald Dworkin.

== Career ==
Mandel was a part of Osgoode Hall Law School's faculty from 1974 until 2013.

In 1999, during the NATO bombing of Serbia, Mandel filed a formal complaint of NATO war crimes with the International Criminal Tribunal for the Former Yugoslavia (ICTY), charging 67 NATO leaders with war crimes. Mandel's submissions were dismissed by the tribunal. He was anti-war and suggested that US President George W. Bush be banned from entering Canada because of the American invasion of Iraq. He was also a critic of the Canadian Charter of Rights and Freedoms, and opposed Zionist settlements in the West Bank and Gaza.

== Publications ==
- Michael Mandel, How America Gets Away with Murder: Illegal Wars, Collateral Damage and Crimes Against Humanity, Pluto Press, 2004 (ISBN 0745321518)
- Michael Mandel, Charter of Rights and The Legalization of Politics in Canada: Revised, Updated and Expanded, Thompson Educational Publishing, 1994 (ISBN 1550770500)
