= Stefan von Bogdándy =

Dr Stefan von Bogdándy
- Bogdándy István
- Born: 11 September 1890; Kolozsvár, Austria-Hungary
- Died: 4 August 1933 (aged 42); Berlin, Germany
- Scientific career
- Fields: Physical chemistry
- Institutions: Fritz Haber Institute of the Max Planck Society

Stefan von Bogdándy (Hungarian: Bogdándy István) (11 September 1890 – 4 August 1933) was a Hungarian physician and physical chemist. He was a close collaborator of Michael Polanyi.

He was born in Kolozsvár in the Kingdom of Hungary (now Cluj-Napoca, Romania), to a noble Hungarian, Roman Catholic family. His father Alexander (Sándor) von Bogdándy (Hungarian: Bogdándy Sándor) was a government official.

He studied medicine in Kolozsvár, and worked as a teaching assistant at the Physiological Institute of the University of Budapest early in his career. He moved to Berlin in the 1920s to work for Fritz Haber at the Kaiser Wilhelm Institute for Physical Chemistry and Electrochemistry. In Berlin he became a close collaborator of Michael Polanyi. Together with Polanyi, he "developed the highly-dilute flame techniques pioneered by the Haber and Zisch into a powerful tool for studying simple reaction rates through chemiluminescence."

While he was known as Bogdándy István in Hungarian, he used the German version of his name, Stefan (von) Bogdándy, in international contexts, as was common practice among Hungarians. In German and English, the family name is often spelled Bogdandy without the accent, and the given name is sometimes also spelled Stephan. The noble particle von is also sometimes omitted. He was the father of the metallurgist and industrial executive Ludwig von Bogdandy and the grandfather of the legal scholar Armin von Bogdandy. Bogdándy died at Berlin in 1933.
