= Christian Tomuschat =

German jurist

- Born: July 23, 1936 (age 90); Szczecin, Poland
- Education: Heidelberg; Montpellier
- Occupation: professor

Christian Tomuschat (born 23 July 1936 in Stettin, Germany (now Szczecin, Poland)) is a German jurist. He is emeritus professor of public international law and European law at the Humboldt University in Berlin and is a former member of the UN Human Rights Committee and the UN's International Law Commission.

== Career ==
After his graduation in 1955 in Stuttgart, he studied law in Heidelberg and Montpellier, and earned his doctorate in 1970. From 1972 to 1995, he held the Chair of Public Law at the University of Bonn.

In 1994 he chaired the UN-sponsored Historical Clarification Commission (CEH), after the conclusion of peace accords between the Guatemalan government and the guerrillas in December 1996, which worked to investigate human rights abuses committed during the Guatemalan Civil War and published its final report on 25 February 1999.

Since 1995 he has been a member of the Berlin-Brandenburg Academy of Sciences and, since April 2003, an honorary Doctor of Law at the University of Zurich. Since April 1995, he holds the Chair of Public and European Law at the Humboldt University in Berlin. In May 2006, he was awarded the Order Pour le Mérite and, in October 2007, he was awarded the Grand Cross of Merit with Star.

In 2003, he was commissioned by Daimler-Chrysler (now Daimler AG) to investigate human rights abuses the company allegedly aided during the Argentine military's Dirty War against suspected opponents, in particular the disappearances of fourteen union members at its Mercedes-Benz factory. He issued a report noting that “MBA [Mercedes-Benz Argentina] has supplied information from company personnel files, including passport photographs, to the state secret service at its request" that put labor leaders in danger, and eventually their murders. Ultimately, he found the activities of its Mercedes-Benz subsidiary did not rise to the level of incitement to kidnapping and murder. Plaintiffs criticized the report as "corporate whitewashing" and some pointed out they had not been interviewed.

In December 2008, with Germany bringing proceedings against Italy in the International Court of Justice, Tomuschat was appointed co-agent representing Germany. The case (Jurisdictional Immunities of the State) alleges that Italy has violated the principle of sovereign immunity by allowing civil claims by victims of Nazi crimes against Germany to proceed in Italian courts.

In 2013, he was elected president of the Court of Conciliation and Arbitration for the Organization for Security and Co-operation in Europe (OSCE), for a six-year term.

== Lectures ==
- What is General International Law? in the Lecture Series of the United Nations Audiovisual Library of International Law

== Selected works ==
- Flexibility in International Dispute Settlement (Brill, 2020) (with Marcelo Kohen).
- Grundgesetz und Völkerrecht, in: Robertson-von Trotha, Caroline Y. (ed.): 60 Jahre Grundgesetz. Interdisziplinäre Perspektiven (= Kulturwissenschaft interdisziplinär/Interdisciplinary Studies on Culture and Society, Vol. 4), Baden-Baden 2009
