= German Yearbook of International Law =

- Discipline: International law
- Language: English, French, German

Publication details
- Former name: Jahrbuch für Internationales Recht
- History: 1948–present
- Publisher: Duncker & Humblot (Germany)
- Frequency: annually

Standard abbreviations
- ISO 4: Ger. Yearb. Int. Law

Indexing
- ISSN: 0344-3094

The German Yearbook of International Law, founded in 1948 by Rudolf Laun and Hermann von Mangoldt as the Jahrbuch für Internationales Recht, is Germany's oldest yearbook in the field of public international law. The GYIL is published annually by the Walther Schücking Institute of International Law at Kiel University and the publisher Duncker & Humblot.

It publishes in English to reach the widest possible audience.

The GYIL provides a forum for scholars in international law – both inside and outside Germany – to publish new research on and analysis of current issues in international law. The journal features a 'Forum' for which a prominent scholar of international law is invited to write a stand-alone article and a 'Focus' section for which a group of experts are invited to write articles examining various aspects of a topic set in advance by the editors. Recent Focus sections have examined climate change (2010), regional human rights mechanisms (2009), poverty as a challenge to international law (2008) and German approaches to international law (2007). The 2011 Focus section will examine the Arctic.

Beginning with Vol. 53 (2010), the 'General Articles' section of the GYIL will be open to submissions from the entire academic community and will be independently peer-reviewed by a community of experts. Manuscripts for the 'General Articles' section may examine a broad range of topics in international law and should be submitted to the editors by 1 September 2011 for consideration for the 2011 volume.

Beginning with Vol. 52 (2009), the section 'German Practice' has appeared, providing reports on German state practice Sources of international law#State practice with relevance for the development of international law. The 'Book Reviews' section presents reviews of recently published works in international law and, in particular, seeks to increase international interest in German and German-language publications by publishing book reviews and review essays in English.
