= Max Planck Institute for Comparative and International Private Law =

Legal research institute in Hamburg, Germany

Coordinates: 53.5626°N 9.9944°E

- Abbreviation: MPIPRIV
- Formation: 1926
- Type: legal research
- Location: Hamburg, Germany
- Director: Holger Fleischer, Ralf Michaels and Anne Röthel
- Parent organization: Max Planck Society
- Staff: approx. 140
- Website: www.mpipriv.de

The Max Planck Institute for Comparative and International Private Law (Max-Planck-Institut für ausländisches und internationales Privatrecht, MPIPRIV) is a legal research institute located in Hamburg, Germany. It is operated by the Max Planck Society. Founded in 1949, it is the successor institution of the Kaiser Wilhelm Institute for Foreign and International Private Law, which was founded in 1926. Since 1956 it has been based in Hamburg's district of Rotherbaum.

The institute is part of the research network Max Planck Law.

== See also ==
- Max Planck Society
- University of Hamburg
- Max Planck Institute for Comparative Public Law and International Law
