= Saint Paul-T University =

Coordinates: 26°49′S 65°13′W

The University of Saint Paul-T (abbreviation: USP-T) was created on July 4, 2007 by presidential decree. It was the first "secular private university" of Argentine Northwest and Argentina.

== Location ==
The university has its headquarters in the city of San Miguel de Tucumán. Its campus is located in the town of San Pablo (also known as Ingenio San Pablo), after which it is named.

== Institutes ==
USP-T has established two strategic fields of knowledge: territorial competitiveness and Andean regional integration. That follows the organization and institutional design of training and research in multiple academic units:

- Institute of Design, Strategy, and Creativity
- Institute for Development and Innovation for Technological Competitiveness
- Institute of Social, Political, and Cultural Studies

== Academic offerings ==
Academic offerings include nine degree tracks, two technical college tracks, and courses of teacher training.

== Scholarships - university social responsibility ==
The university, as part of its institutional policy based on education excellence, offers a scholarship program. In 2010, the University and Sugar Company Balkans awarded new scholarships. In 2011, USP-T launched a financial aid program: "University for All" (Spanish: Universidad para todos).
