= Anne Peters =

German-Swiss jurist

- Born: 15 November 1964 (age 61); Berlin, Germany

Academic background
- Education: University of Würzburg; University of Lausanne; University of Freiburg (PhD); Harvard Law School (LLM); University of Kiel (Hab.)
- Theses: Das Gebietsreferendum im Völkerrecht: seine Bedeutung im Licht der Staatenpraxis (1994); Elemente einer Theorie der Verfassung Europas (2000)

Academic work
- Discipline: Public international law
- Sub-discipline: European law; Global governance
- Institutions: University of Basel; Max Planck Institute for Comparative Public Law and International Law

Anne Peters (born November 15, 1964, in Berlin) is a German-Swiss jurist with a focus on public international law. She is director at the Max Planck Institute for Comparative Public Law and International Law, titular professor at the University of Basel and Honorary Professor at University of Heidelberg and Free University of Berlin, and L. Bates Lea Global Law Professor at the University of Michigan Law School.

Her research interests include constitutionalization and the history of international law, global animal rights, global governance and the status of humans in international law. From 2019 to 2023, Peters chaired the German Society for International Law (DGIR). In April 2024, Peters presented arguments on behalf of Germany before the International Court of Justice in the provisional measures proceedings in Nicaragua v. Germany.

== Life and work ==
Anne Peters studied law, Modern Greek and Spanish at the Julius-Maximilians-Universität Würzburg, at the University of Lausanne, at Albert-Ludwigs-Universität Freiburg and at Harvard Law School. Peters earned her doctorate in 1994 at the Albert-Ludwigs-Universität Freiburg on the basis of her Dissertation-Thesis Das Gebietsreferendum im Völkerrecht: seine Bedeutung im Licht der Staatenpraxis (The regional referendum in international law: its significance in the light of state practice). From 1995 to 2001 she worked as a research assistant at the Walther Schücking Institute for International Law of the Christian-Albrechts-University in Kiel. She obtained the Habilitation-qualification at the University of Kiel on the basis of her Habilitation-Thesis Elemente einer Theorie der Verfassung Europas (Elements of a Theory of the Constitution of Europe) in 2000.

From 2001 to 2013, Peters was full professor of international and constitutional law at the University of Basel. From 2004 to 2005 she was dean, from 2008 to 2013, she served as research dean of the Law Faculty of Basel and from 2008 to 2013 member of the research council at the Swiss National Science Foundation. She has been a director at the Max Planck Institute for Comparative Public Law and International Law in Heidelberg since 2013. She has also been titular professor of public law, international law, European law and comparative law at the University of Basel since 2013, a Corresponding Member of the Austrian Academy of Sciences and since 2014 honorary professor at the Ruprecht-Karls-Universität Heidelberg.

She has been a visiting professor at Sciences Po (2009), Paris Panthéon-Assas University, Institut des hautes études internationales (2014), Beijing University, Institute of International Law (2014 and 2016) and the Université Panthéon-Sorbonne (2015). She was a fellow at the Wissenschaftskolleg zu Berlin in 2012/2013.

Peters was president of the European Society of International Law from 2010 to 2012, as well as board member of the German Association of Constitutional Law (VDStRL) from 2014 to 2015. She was a member (substitute) of the Venice Commission (European Commission for Democracy through Law) for Germany (2011–2015) and legal expert of the Independent Fact Finding Mission on the conflict in Georgia (2009). She has been a member of the board of directors of the German Society for International Law (DGIR) (2017–2019), of the general council of the International Society of Public Law (I-CON-S) since 2014. From 2004 to 2025, she was vice-president of the foundation board of the Basel Institute on Governance.

She has been a member of the Council of International Law of the Federal Foreign Office since 2013 as well as of the research advisory board of the Stiftung Wissenschaft und Politik – German Institute for International and Security Affairs. Since 2021, she is general editor of the Max Planck Encyclopedia of Public International Law. She is co-editor of The Cambridge History of International Law.

== Research focus and theses ==
Peters' research interests relate to public international law including its history, global animal law, global governance and global constitutionalism, and the status of humans in international law. Peters’ theses are the following:

International law should and can counteract its tendency towards epistemic nationalism by problematizing national prejudices and maintaining sufficient distance from legal practice; the pursuit of a constructive utopia is the task of international law. The well-being of people, their security and their rights are the foundation and limit of state sovereignty. "Humanity", not "sovereignty" is the ultimate rationale of international law. The individual enjoys "subjective international rights" and obligations which are, so to speak, below the threshold of particularly high-quality human rights, for example in international labor law, refugee law, international humanitarian law, etc. Allowing the recognition of these legal positions and the (contingent) international legal capacity of human beings expressed therein it is to qualify the individual as an original and normative priority (not only derived from the states and subordinate) subject of international law. The shift from the state as the starting point of international law to man represents a paradigm shift in the international legal order.

Referendums on territory, when conducted freely, fairly, peacefully and under impartial supervision, are a necessary but not sufficient procedural factor in the exercise of peoples' right to self-determination. In this way they can contribute to the legalization of a change of territory, even in the case of the unilateral separation of a region from a state.

EU basic legal norms can and should be qualified as a constitution of the EU (irrespective of the existence of a formal constitutional document). This European constitution obtains its legitimacy mainly through probation, and thus through its "output", i.e. legal and political results in the European public interest, less by its genesis and by the "input" from European citizens through elections and votes.

The erosion of state constitutional law through increasingly intense exercise of sovereignty by International Organizations, increasing international regulations and extraterritorial effects of state action can and should be compensated by the recognition of global constitutional law, which constitutes, channels and limits this exercise of sovereignty ("compensatory constitutionalism").

The democratization of international law and global governance is possible and necessary to complement its indirect democratic legitimacy (via national parliaments and governments) ("dual democracy").

A general principle of transparency has emerged as the fundamental principle of international law in all its branches, beginning with environmental law. The function of transparency in international law is similar to that in national public law: transparency enables public criticism of the exercise of international sovereignty. The principle of transparency strengthens the quality of international law as public law, as the right to establish and channel sovereignty, in the public interest and under the control of the public. The transparency of international institutions and legislative and implementation procedures can thus mitigate the democratic deficit of international law, ie the lack of a world parliament, a democratic legislative process, and a direct right of citizens to participate in the appointment of international offices.

The history of international law can be rewritten using approaches of global history. The Global History Approach raises awareness of the problem of Eurocentrism in the development of international law and its presentation, and makes it easier to recognize and appreciate non-European influences.

Global animal rights will be established and developed as a field of research to safeguard animal welfare standards undermined by globalization, outsourcing and location mobility and to explore new concepts such as animal rights, animal status, the sovereignty of wildlife over natural resources. The new field of research can receive suggestions from numerous neighboring disciplines as part of the "animal turn" of the humanities and social sciences.
