= Rudolf Bernhardt =

German judge and jurist (1925–2021)

President of the European Court of Human Rights
- In office 24 March 1998 – 31 October 1998
- Preceded by: Rolv Ryssdal
- Succeeded by: Luzius Wildhaber

Judge of the European Court of Human Rights
- In office 27 January 1981 – 1 November 1998
- Preceded by: Hermann Mosler
- Succeeded by: Renate Jaeger

Personal details
- Born: 29 April 1925 Kassel, Hesse-Nassau, Prussia, Germany
- Died: 1 December 2021 (aged 96)

Rudolf Bernhardt (29 April 1925 – 1 December 2021) was a German judge. He represented Germany on the European Court of Human Rights from 1981 to 1998 and served as President of the Court from 24 March to 31 October 1998.
