= Constitutional pluralism =

Constitutional pluralism is a legal doctrine dealing with real or perceived conflicts between national constitutions and international law, as enshrined in treaties, international dispute resolution mechanisms, or the European Union. The doctrine has received criticism due to its perceived abuse by states undergoing autocratization such as Poland and Hungary in the late 2010s.
