= Hermann Mosler =

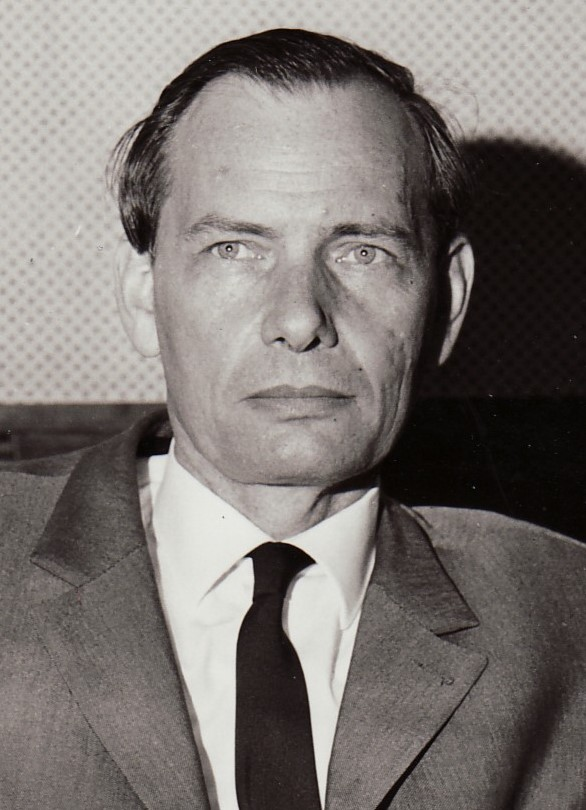
Hermann Mosler (1964)

Hermann Mosler (December 26, 1912 - December 4, 2001) was a German legal academic and judge. Mosler was a judge at the European Court of Human Rights from 1959 to 1980 and at the International Court of Justice from 1976 to 1985. Additionally, Mosler was the head of the Max Planck Institute for Comparative Public Law and International Law in Heidelberg. He graduated with a doctorate in law from the University of Bonn in 1934.
