= Max Planck Law =

Research network in Germany

Max Planck Law is a research network connecting eight Max Planck Institutes in Germany engaged in legal research. It is formally classified as a Graduate Center of the Max Planck Society and has over 400 PhD students and postdoc researchers.

The Max Planck Society has undertaken research in law since 1924. Starting with just two Max Planck Institutes dedicated to legal research, over time, the number of institutes and departments increased. In 2019, they came together as a network with the establishment of Max Planck Law.

The idea of 'complementarity' underpins Max Planck Law. It acknowledges that a wider range of subjects can be covered and that interdisciplinarity and internationality can be more effectively achieved through a network of institutes rather than a single isolated institute.

Max Planck Law Perspectives consists of articles by Max Planck Law researchers on topical legal issues are published online regularly; these are archived on a central publication platform established by the German Research Foundation at the Berlin State Library.

Max Planck Law is consistently ranked in the top two in SSRN's league table of Top 500 International Law Schools.
