= Rüdiger Wolfrum =

German judge

Rüdiger Wolfrum (born 13 December 1941 in Berlin) is a German jurist and the current professor of international law at the Heidelberg University Faculty of Law and director emeritus of the Heidelberg Max Planck Institute for Comparative Public Law and International Law. Wolfrum was a judge at the International Tribunal for the Law of the Sea from 1996 to 2017, serving as president of the court from 2005 to 2008.

== Early life and education ==
After his military duty, Wolfrum studied law at the universities of Tübingen and Bonn from 1964 to 1969. Passing his first state exam on 18 January 1969, he earned a PhD in International Law in 1973.

== Career ==
Wolfrum served as Vice President of the German Research Foundation from 1996 to 2002, and as Vice President of the Max Planck Society from 2002 to 2006. In 1996, he was appointed Justice at the International Tribunal for the Law of the Sea; from 2005 to 2008 he has served as its president. Wolfrum is President of the German Society for International Law, and he has also been a member of numerous national and international councils and academies, such as the United Nations Committee on the Elimination of Racial Discrimination and the Institut de Droit International. Since January 2013 he is one of the managing directors of the Max Planck Foundation for International Peace and the Rule of Law.

Besides his numerous offices, Wolfrum has instructed the High Justices of Afghanistan and Sudan, and he has acted as a United Nations mediator in the Darfur conflict. In 2026, he was one of two conciliators appointed by Thailand for a compulsory conciliation process under the United Nations Convention on the Law of the Sea (UNCLOS) that was initiated by Cambodia to resolve ‌a long-running maritime dispute.

== Recognition ==
In 2008, Wolfrum was awarded the Great Cross of Merit of the Federal Republic of Germany. He holds honorary degrees of the Russian Academy of Sciences, of the Mongolian Shihutug Law College, the University of Hamburg, and of the University of Pretoria.

== Recent publications ==
- Fighting terrorism at sea: options and limitations under international law. Japan Society for Defense Studies, Tokio 2008.
- The protection of the environment through international courts and tribunals. In: Andreas Fischer-Lescano (Hrsg.): Frieden in Freiheit - Festschrift für Michael Bothe zum 70. Geburtstag. Nomos, Baden-Baden 2008, ISBN 978-3-8329-3667-9, S. 807.
- Kosovo - some thoughts on its future status. In: Sienho Yee (Hrsg.): Multiculturalism and international law - essays in honour of Edward McWhinney. Nijhoff, Leiden 2009, ISBN 978-90-04-17471-9, S. 561.

== Lectures ==
- Legitimacy in International Law in the Lecture Series of the United Nations Audiovisual Library of International Law
- Environmental Law: Preservation of the Marine Environment in the Lecture Series of the United Nations Audiovisual Library of International Law
- Security at Sea in the Lecture Series of the United Nations Audiovisual Library of International Law
- „Die Festlegung von Seegrenzen“ on YouTube (German)

== See also ==
- International Tribunal for the Law of the Sea
- University of Heidelberg
- Max Planck Society
